= 1952 Ireland rugby union tour of South America =

Irish's rugby national selection Tour of matches

Summary
P	W	D	L
Total
9	6	2	1
Test match
2	1	1	0
Opponent
P	W	D	L
Argentina
2	1	1	0

Tour chronology
- ← Canada 1899 South Africa 1961 →

The 1952 Ireland rugby union tour of South America, was a series of rugby matches played in Chile and Argentina. This tour by the Ireland national rugby union team coincided with the death of Eva Peron, the wife of Juan Peron, the President of Argentina. As a result, it was almost cancelled. Eva Peron died on 26 July, six days after the Irish squad had departed Dublin. However, after playing their first game in Santiago, Chile, the team travelled onto Buenos Aires and completed the tour as planned.

They finished with a record of played 9, won 6, drew 2 and 1 defeat. The tour also featured the first full rugby internationals between Ireland and Argentina.

== Touring party ==
- Manager: G.P.S. Hogan
- Secretary: R.W. Jeffares, Jr
- Referee: O.B. Glasgow
- Captain: Des O'Brien

=== Backs ===
- M. Birthistle (Old Belvedere)
- Richard Chambers (Instonians)
- Robin Gregg (Queen's University)
- John Hewitt (Instonians)
- Mick Hillary (University College Dublin)
- J.T. Horgan (University College Cork)
- Mick Lane (University College Cork)
- Jack Notley (Wanderers)
- John O'Meara (University College Cork)

=== Forwards ===
- Fuzzy Anderson (Queen's University)
- D. Crowley (Cork Constitution)
- Michael Dargan (Old Belvedere)
- Ronnie Kavanagh (University College Dublin)
- Patrick Kavanagh (University College Dublin)
- Des O'Brien (Cardiff)
- Archie O'Leary (Cork Constitution)
- William O'Neill (University College Dublin)
- Paddy Lawlor (Clontarf)
- Jim McCarthy (Dolphin)
- John Smith (Collegians)
- Paul Traynor (Clontarf)

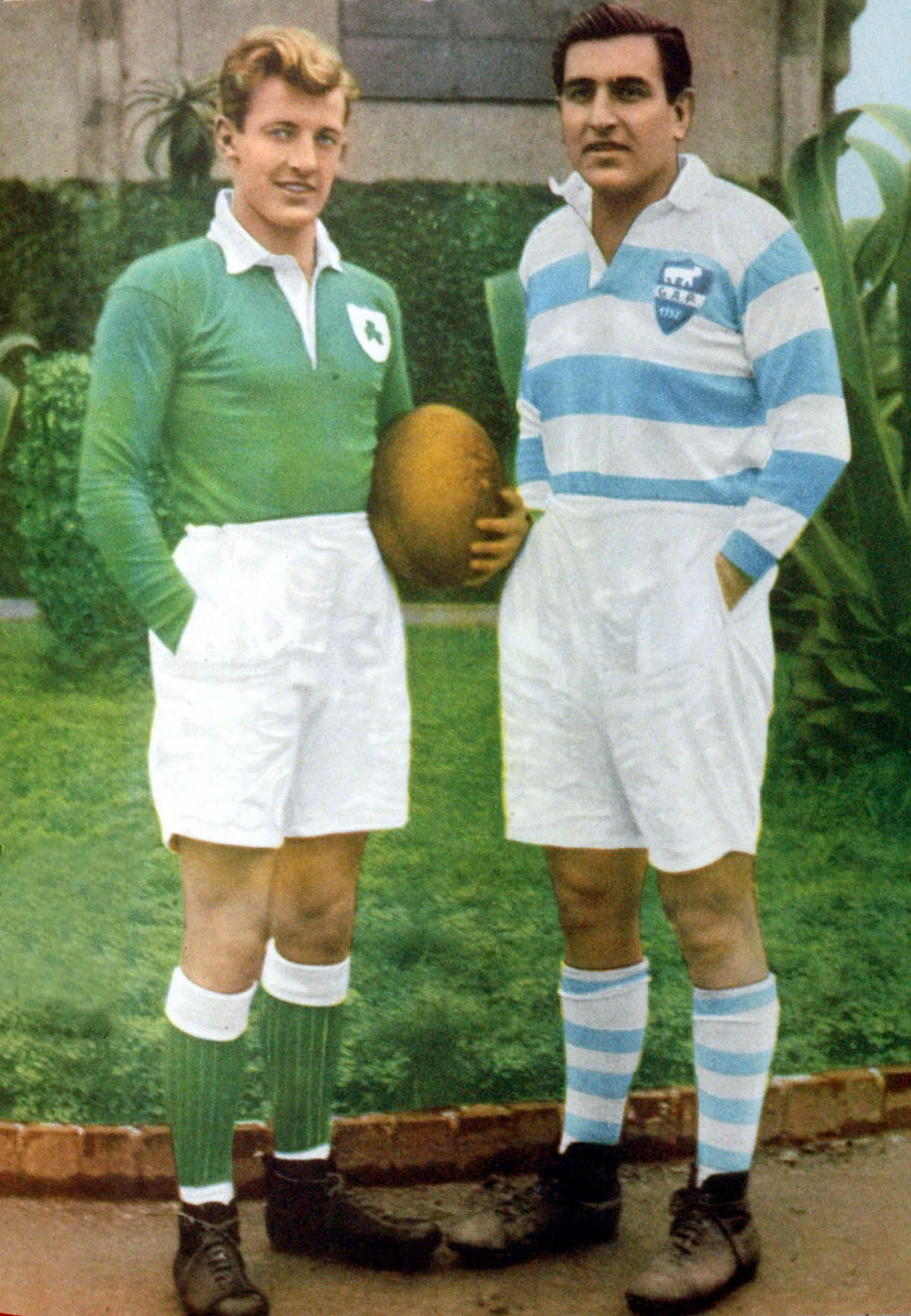
W.J. Hewitt and Miguel Angel Sarandón posing together in Argentina

== Match details ==
9 August

Chile	0–30	Ireland

Santiago

12 August

Capital	6–12	Ireland

Gimnasia y Esgrima, Buenos Aires

15 August

Club Pucará	11–6	Ireland

Gimnasia y Esgrima, Buenos Aires

17 August

Provincia	6–6	Ireland

Gimnasia y Esgrima, Buenos Aires

21 August

Argentina A	3–19	Ireland

Gimnasia y Esgrima, Buenos Aires

=== First test ===
24 August

Argentina	3–3	Ireland
Try: Fernandez del Casal		Try: O'Meara

Gimnasia y Esgrima, Buenos Aires
Referee: Ossie Glassgow (Ireland)

Team details

Argentina	Ireland

Julio Genoud	FB	15	FB	Robin Gregg
Edmundo Caffarone	W	14	W	Mick Lane
Enrique Fernández del Casal	C	13	C	Richard Chambers
Alfredo Palma	C	12	C	John Notley
Julián Santiago	W	11	W	Michael Hillary
Ricardo Giles	FH	10	FH	William Hewitt
Guillermo Ehrman	SH	9	SH	John O'Meara
Miguel Sarandon	N8	8	N8	Jim McCarthy
Alberto Conen	F	7	F	Patrick Kavanagh
Rodolfo Grosse	F	6	F	Michael Dargan
Lucas Glastra	L	5	L	Patrick Lawlor
Emilio Domínguez	L	4	L	P.P. Traynor
Normando Tompkins	P	3	P	W.J. O'Neill
Carlos Swain	H	2	H	Fuzzy Anderson
Ricardo Follett	P	1	P	John Smith
		Coaches
				GPS Hogan

28 August

Argentina B	3–25	Ireland

Gimnasia y Esgrima, Buenos Aires

=== Second test ===
31 August

Argentina	0–6	Ireland
		Pen: Dargan, Hillary

Gimnasia y Esgrima, Buenos Aires

Team details

Argentina	Ireland

Enrique Fernández del Casal	FB	15	FB	Robin Gregg
Edmundo Caffarone	W	14	W	Patrick Kavanagh
Gastón Recagno	C	13	C	Richard Chambers
Alfredo Palma	C	12	C	John Notley
Antonio Salinas	W	11	W	Michael Hillary
Ricardo Giles	FH	10	FH	William Hewitt
Guillermo Ehrman	SH	9	SH	John O'Meara
Ezequiel Holmberg	N8	8	N8	Jim McCarthy
Rodolfo Grosse	F	7	F	Des O'Brien (c)
Alberto Conen	F	6	F	Michael Dargan
Luis Maurette	L	5	L	P.P. Traynor
Emilio Domínguez	L	4	L	James Kavanagh
Normando Tompkins	P	3	P	W.J. O'Neill
Carlos Swain	H	2	H	Fuzzy Anderson
Ricardo Follett	P	1	P	John Smith
		Coaches
				GPS Horgan

3 September 1952

Universitario B.A.	11–19	Ireland

Gimnasia y Esgrima, Buenos Aires
