= List of England national rugby union team results 1950–1959 =

These are the list of results that England have played from 1950 to 1959.

== 1950 ==
Scores and results list England's points tally first.

Opposing Teams	For	Against	Date	Venue	Status
Wales	5	11	21/01/1950	Twickenham, London	Five Nations
Ireland	3	0	11/02/1950	Twickenham, London	Five Nations
France	3	6	25/02/1950	Stade Colombes, Paris	Five Nations
Scotland	11	13	18/03/1950	Murrayfield, Edinburgh	Five Nations

== 1951 ==
Scores and results list England's points tally first.

Opposing Teams	For	Against	Date	Venue	Status
Wales	5	23	20/01/1951	St Helen's, Swansea	Five Nations
Ireland	0	3	10/02/1951	Lansdowne Road, Dublin	Five Nations
France	3	11	24/02/1951	Twickenham, London	Five Nations
Scotland	5	3	17/03/1951	Twickenham, London	Five Nations

== 1952 ==
Scores and results list England's points tally first.

Opposing Teams	For	Against	Date	Venue	Status
South Africa	3	8	05/01/1952	Twickenham, London	Test Match
Wales	6	8	19/01/1952	Twickenham, London	Five Nations
Scotland	19	3	15/03/1952	Murrayfield, Edinburgh	Five Nations
Ireland	3	0	29/03/1952	Twickenham, London	Five Nations
France	6	3	05/04/1952	Stade Colombes, Paris	Five Nations

== 1953 ==
Scores and results list England's points tally first.

Opposing Teams	For	Against	Date	Venue	Status
Wales	8	3	17/01/1953	Cardiff Arms Park, Cardiff	Five Nations
Ireland	9	9	14/02/1953	Lansdowne Road, Dublin	Five Nations
France	11	0	28/02/1953	Twickenham, London	Five Nations
Scotland	26	8	21/03/1953	Twickenham, London	Five Nations

== 1954 ==
Scores and results list England's points tally first.

Opposing Teams	For	Against	Date	Venue	Status
Wales	9	6	16/01/1954	Twickenham, London	Five Nations
New Zealand	0	5	30/01/1954	Twickenham, London	Test Match
Ireland	14	3	13/02/1954	Twickenham, London	Five Nations
Scotland	13	3	20/03/1954	Murrayfield, Edinburgh	Five Nations
France	3	11	10/04/1954	Stade Colombes, Paris	Five Nations

== 1955 ==
Scores and results list England's points tally first.

Opposing Teams	For	Against	Date	Venue	Status
Wales	0	3	22/01/1955	Cardiff Arms Park, Cardiff	Five Nations
Ireland	6	6	12/02/1955	Lansdowne Road, Dublin	Five Nations
France	9	16	26/02/1955	Twickenham, London	Five Nations
Scotland	9	6	19/03/1955	Twickenham, London	Five Nations

== 1956 ==
Scores and results list England's points tally first.

Opposing Teams	For	Against	Date	Venue	Status
Wales	3	8	21/01/1956	Twickenham, London	Five Nations
Ireland	20	0	11/02/1956	Twickenham, London	Five Nations
Scotland	11	6	17/03/1956	Murrayfield, Edinburgh	Five Nations
France	9	14	14/04/1956	Stade Colombes, Paris	Five Nations

== 1957 ==
Scores and results list England's points tally first.

Opposing Teams	For	Against	Date	Venue	Status
Wales	3	0	19/01/1957	Cardiff Arms Park, Cardiff	Five Nations
Ireland	6	0	09/02/1957	Lansdowne Road, Dublin	Five Nations
France	9	5	23/02/1957	Twickenham, London	Five Nations
Scotland	16	3	16/03/1957	Twickenham, London	Five Nations

== 1958 ==
Scores and results list England's points tally first.

Opposing Teams	For	Against	Date	Venue	Status
Wales	3	3	18/01/1958	Twickenham, London	Five Nations
Australia	9	6	01/02/1958	Twickenham, London	Test Match
Ireland	6	0	08/02/1958	Twickenham, London	Five Nations
France	14	0	01/03/1958	Stade Colombes, Paris	Five Nations
Scotland	3	3	19/03/1960	Murrayfield, Edinburgh	Five Nations

== 1959 ==
Scores and results list England's points tally first.

Opposing Teams	For	Against	Date	Venue	Status
Wales	0	5	17/01/1959	Cardiff Arms Park, Cardiff	Five Nations
Ireland	3	0	14/02/1959	Lansdowne Road, Dublin	Five Nations
France	3	3	28/02/1959	Twickenham, London	Five Nations
Scotland	3	3	21/03/1959	Twickenham, London	Five Nations

== Year Box ==
Preceded by 1947–1949	England Rugby Results; 1950–1959	Succeeded by 1960–1969
