= History of rugby union matches between France and Wales =

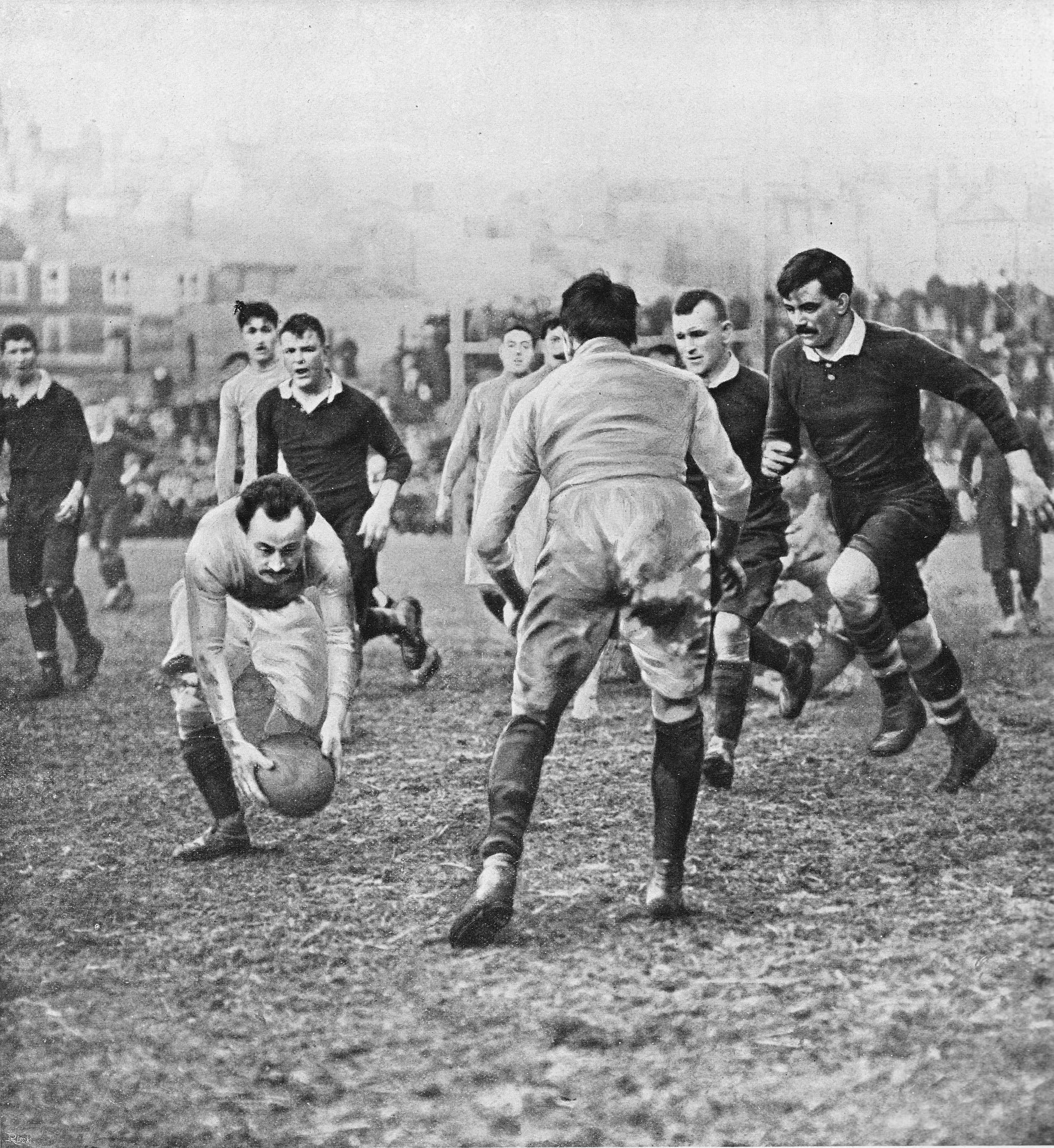
Scene of the first Wales v France match ever, played in Cardiff on March 2, 1908

France and Wales have played each other at rugby union since 1908. A total of 106 matches have been played, with Wales winning 51 games, France winning 52 and the remaining three finishing as draws.

The early years of the fixture were dominated by Wales, who won 18 of the first 19 matches before France were expelled from the Five Nations Championship after the 1931 tournament. Since France rejoined the competition in 1947, they have won 50 of the 86 matches played, including a 12-match winning streak between 1983 and 1993. The teams have met twice in the Rugby World Cup, firstly in the semi-finals of the 2011 tournament, which France won 9–8, then in the quarter-finals of the 2019 Rugby World Cup, which Wales won 20–19.

== Summary ==
Note: Summary below reflects test results by both teams.

=== Overview ===
Details	Played	Won by France	Won by Wales	Drawn	France points	Wales points
In France	50	29	20	1	830	681
In Wales	53	21	30	2	807	925
Neutral venue	3	2	1	0	79	28
Overall	106	52	51	3	1,716	1,634

=== Records ===
Note: Date shown in brackets indicates when the record was or last set.

Record	France	Wales
Longest winning streak	12 (1983–1994)	15 (1908–1928)
Largest points for
Home	43 (31 January 2025)	49 (1 January 1910)
Away	54 (15 February 2026)	47 (23 February 1909)
Largest winning margin
Home	43 (31 January 2025)	35 (1 January 1910)
Away	51 (5 April 1998)	42 (23 February 1909)

== Breakdown ==
Five Nations Championship results (1910–1999)
Team	Wins	W%
France	30	42.86
Wales	37	52.86
Draws	3	—N/a
Total	70	

Six Nations Championship results (2000–present)
Team	Wins	W%
France	17	63
Wales	10	37
Draws	—N/a	
Total	27	

Combined Five/Six Nations Championship results (1910–present)
Team	Wins	W%
France	47	47.45
Wales	47	47.45
Draws	3	—N/a
Total	97	

=== Early history: Welsh domination ===
Early in the history of the France–Wales match-up, Wales dominated the encounters with big victories from the 1908 Home Nations Internationals to the 1911 Five Nations Championship. Between 1910 and 1929, France finished wooden spooners six times in the competition, more than any other team, going back-to-back on two occasions (seasons 1912–1913 and 1925–1926). During this period France only managed to beat Wales once from a total of seventeen games. Indeed, Wales was France's most difficult Five/Home Nations Championship opponent at the time, holding just a 5.88% win percentage against them, whereas they held a 6.67% win percentage (1/15) against England, a 20% win percentage (3/15) against Ireland, and a 21.43% win percentage (3/14) against Scotland. Wales, by contrast, held a win percentage above 39% against all other Home/Five Nations Championship opponents. By the end of 1959 France and Wales had played against each other a total of thirty-two times. And although France's win percentage had improved (to 18.75%), it was still significantly lower than their win percentage against the other Five Nations Championship opponents (their lowest being 26.67% against England; their highest being 37.93% against Scotland).

=== 1960–1980: Turning the tide ===
From 1960 to 1980 the two sides played each other on twenty-one occasions. The record was split 9–9, with three draws. By this point the tide had slowly turned from being a one-sided affair to a more competitive one. Up to that point Wales had won 66.04% of their encounters and still remained France's most difficult Five Nations Championship opponent. French improvement remained consistent against all other Five Nations Championship competitors as well. Their win percentage by 1980 was 35.29% against England, 48.08% against Ireland, and 48% against Scotland.

=== 1980s–1990s: French command ===
Similar to the first two decades between France and Wales, in which Wales won an overwhelming majority of fixtures played between the pair, between the years 1980 and 1999 France dominated the Welsh; they won seventeen out of twenty-three meetings (73.91%), including a twelve-match win streak between the years 1983 and 1993.

=== Six Nations era: 2000–present ===
Since the introduction of the Six Nations Championship, France and Wales have each won four Grand Slam's. Early during the 2000s France largely maintained the stranglehold that they gained throughout the previous decade, winning eight out of eleven matches. Following Wales' 2008 Six Nations Championship win over France, it would take Wales another four years before they would win another match 2012 Six Nations Championship. In both years Wales were crowned Six Nations Champions.

As of 2026, both teams are each other's most competitive test side, with France having just one more victory than Wales.

== Results ==
No.	Date	Venue	Score	Winner	Competition
1	2 March 1908	National Stadium, Cardiff	36–4	Wales	1908 Home Nations Championship
2	23 February 1909	Stade Yves-du-Manoir, Colombes	5–47	Wales	1909 Home Nations Championship
3	1 January 1910	St Helen's, Swansea	49–14	Wales	1910 Five Nations Championship
4	28 February 1911	Parc des Princes, Paris	0–15	Wales	1911 Five Nations Championship
5	25 March 1912	Rodney Parade, Newport	14–8	Wales	1912 Five Nations Championship
6	27 February 1913	Parc des Princes, Paris	8–11	Wales	1913 Five Nations Championship
7	2 March 1914	St Helen's, Swansea	31–0	Wales	1914 Five Nations Championship
8	17 February 1920	Stade Yves-du-Manoir, Colombes	5–6	Wales	1920 Five Nations Championship
9	26 February 1921	National Stadium, Cardiff	12–4	Wales	1921 Five Nations Championship
10	23 March 1922	Stade Yves-du-Manoir, Colombes	3–11	Wales	1922 Five Nations Championship
11	24 February 1923	St Helen's, Swansea	16–8	Wales	1923 Five Nations Championship
12	27 March 1924	Stade Yves-du-Manoir, Colombes	6–10	Wales	1924 Five Nations Championship
13	28 February 1925	National Stadium, Cardiff	11–5	Wales	1925 Five Nations Championship
14	5 April 1926	Stade Yves-du-Manoir, Colombes	5–7	Wales	1926 Five Nations Championship
15	26 February 1927	St Helen's, Swansea	25–7	Wales	1927 Five Nations Championship
16	9 April 1928	Stade Yves-du-Manoir, Colombes	8–3	France	1928 Five Nations Championship
17	23 February 1929	National Stadium, Cardiff	8–3	Wales	1929 Five Nations Championship
18	21 April 1930	Stade Yves-du-Manoir, Colombes	0–11	Wales	1930 Five Nations Championship
19	28 February 1931	St Helen's, Swansea	35–3	Wales	1931 Five Nations Championship
20	22 March 1947	Stade Yves-du-Manoir, Colombes	0–3	Wales	1947 Five Nations Championship
21	21 February 1948	St Helen's, Swansea	3–11	France	1948 Five Nations Championship
22	26 March 1949	Stade Yves-du-Manoir, Colombes	5–3	France	1949 Five Nations Championship
23	25 March 1950	National Stadium, Cardiff	21–0	Wales	1950 Five Nations Championship
24	7 April 1951	Stade Yves-du-Manoir, Colombes	8–3	France	1951 Five Nations Championship
25	22 March 1952	St Helen's, Swansea	9–5	Wales	1952 Five Nations Championship
26	28 March 1953	Stade Yves-du-Manoir, Colombes	3–6	Wales	1953 Five Nations Championship
27	27 March 1954	National Stadium, Cardiff	19–13	Wales	1954 Five Nations Championship
28	26 March 1955	Stade Yves-du-Manoir, Colombes	11–16	Wales	1955 Five Nations Championship
29	24 March 1956	National Stadium, Cardiff	5–3	Wales	1956 Five Nations Championship
30	23 March 1957	Stade Yves-du-Manoir, Colombes	13–19	Wales	1957 Five Nations Championship
31	29 March 1958	National Stadium, Cardiff	6–16	France	1958 Five Nations Championship
32	4 April 1959	Stade Yves-du-Manoir, Colombes	11–3	France	1959 Five Nations Championship
33	26 March 1960	National Stadium, Cardiff	8–16	France	1960 Five Nations Championship
34	25 March 1961	Stade Yves-du-Manoir, Colombes	8–6	France	1961 Five Nations Championship
35	24 March 1962	National Stadium, Cardiff	3–0	Wales	1962 Five Nations Championship
36	23 March 1963	Stade Yves-du-Manoir, Colombes	5–3	France	1963 Five Nations Championship
37	21 March 1964	National Stadium, Cardiff	11–11	draw	1964 Five Nations Championship
38	27 March 1965	Stade Yves-du-Manoir, Colombes	22–13	France	1965 Five Nations Championship
39	26 March 1966	National Stadium, Cardiff	9–8	Wales	1966 Five Nations Championship
40	1 April 1967	Stade Yves-du-Manoir, Colombes	20–14	France	1967 Five Nations Championship
41	23 March 1968	National Stadium, Cardiff	9–14	France	1968 Five Nations Championship
42	22 March 1969	Stade Yves-du-Manoir, Colombes	8–8	draw	1969 Five Nations Championship
43	4 April 1970	National Stadium, Cardiff	11–6	Wales	1970 Five Nations Championship
44	27 March 1971	Stade Yves-du-Manoir, Colombes	5–9	Wales	1971 Five Nations Championship
45	25 March 1972	National Stadium, Cardiff	20–6	Wales	1972 Five Nations Championship
46	24 March 1973	Parc des Princes, Paris	12–3	France	1973 Five Nations Championship
47	16 February 1974	National Stadium, Cardiff	16–16	draw	1974 Five Nations Championship
48	18 January 1975	Parc des Princes, Paris	10–25	Wales	1975 Five Nations Championship
49	6 March 1976	National Stadium, Cardiff	19–13	Wales	1976 Five Nations Championship
50	5 February 1977	Parc des Princes, Paris	16–9	France	1977 Five Nations Championship
51	18 March 1978	National Stadium, Cardiff	16–7	Wales	1978 Five Nations Championship
52	17 February 1979	Parc des Princes, Paris	14–13	France	1979 Five Nations Championship
53	19 January 1980	National Stadium, Cardiff	18–9	Wales	1980 Five Nations Championship
54	7 March 1981	Parc des Princes, Paris	19–15	France	1981 Five Nations Championship
55	6 February 1982	National Stadium, Cardiff	22–12	Wales	1982 Five Nations Championship
56	19 March 1983	Parc des Princes, Paris	16–9	France	1983 Five Nations Championship
57	18 February 1984	National Stadium, Cardiff	16–21	France	1984 Five Nations Championship
58	30 March 1985	Parc des Princes, Paris	14–3	France	1985 Five Nations Championship
59	1 March 1986	National Stadium, Cardiff	15–23	France	1986 Five Nations Championship
60	7 February 1987	Parc des Princes, Paris	16–9	France	1987 Five Nations Championship
61	19 March 1988	National Stadium, Cardiff	9–10	France	1988 Five Nations Championship
62	18 February 1989	Parc des Princes, Paris	31–12	France	1989 Five Nations Championship
63	20 January 1990	National Stadium, Cardiff	19–29	France	1990 Five Nations Championship
64	2 March 1991	Parc des Princes, Paris	36–3	France	1991 Five Nations Championship
65	4 September 1991	National Stadium, Cardiff	9–22	France	1991 Rugby World Cup warm-up match
66	1 February 1992	National Stadium, Cardiff	9–12	France	1992 Five Nations Championship
67	20 March 1993	Parc des Princes, Paris	26–10	France	1993 Five Nations Championship
68	19 February 1994	National Stadium, Cardiff	24–15	Wales	1994 Five Nations Championship
69	21 January 1995	Parc des Princes, Paris	21–9	France	1995 Five Nations Championship
70	16 March 1996	National Stadium, Cardiff	16–15	Wales	1996 Five Nations Championship
71	25 September 1996	National Stadium, Cardiff	33–40	France	1996 France tour of Wales
72	15 February 1997	Parc des Princes, Paris	27–22	France	1997 Five Nations Championship
73	5 April 1998	Wembley Stadium, London (England)	0–51	France	1998 Five Nations Championship
74	6 March 1999	Stade de France, Saint-Denis	33–34	Wales	1999 Five Nations Championship
75	28 August 1999	Millennium Stadium, Cardiff	34–23	Wales	1999 Rugby World Cup warm-up match
76	5 February 2000	Millennium Stadium, Cardiff	3–36	France	2000 Six Nations Championship
77	17 March 2001	Stade de France, Saint-Denis	35–43	Wales	2001 Six Nations Championship
78	16 February 2002	Millennium Stadium, Cardiff	33–37	France	2002 Six Nations Championship
79	29 March 2003	Stade de France, Saint-Denis	33–5	France	2003 Six Nations Championship
80	7 March 2004	Millennium Stadium, Cardiff	22–29	France	2004 Six Nations Championship
81	26 February 2005	Stade de France, Saint-Denis	18–24	Wales	2005 Six Nations Championship
82	18 March 2006	Millennium Stadium, Cardiff	16–21	France	2006 Six Nations Championship
83	24 February 2007	Stade de France, Saint-Denis	32–21	France	2007 Six Nations Championship
84	26 August 2007	Millennium Stadium, Cardiff	7–34	France	2007 Rugby World Cup warm-up match
85	15 March 2008	Millennium Stadium, Cardiff	29–12	Wales	2008 Six Nations Championship
86	27 February 2009	Stade de France, Saint-Denis	21–16	France	2009 Six Nations Championship
87	26 February 2010	Millennium Stadium, Cardiff	20–26	France	2010 Six Nations Championship
88	19 March 2011	Stade de France, Saint-Denis	28–9	France	2011 Six Nations Championship
89	15 October 2011	Eden Park, Auckland (New Zealand)	8–9	France	2011 Rugby World Cup
90	17 March 2012	Millennium Stadium, Cardiff	16–9	Wales	2012 Six Nations Championship
91	9 February 2013	Stade de France, Saint-Denis	6–16	Wales	2013 Six Nations Championship
92	21 February 2014	Millennium Stadium, Cardiff	27–6	Wales	2014 Six Nations Championship
93	28 February 2015	Stade de France, Saint-Denis	13–20	Wales	2015 Six Nations Championship
94	26 February 2016	Millennium Stadium, Cardiff	19–10	Wales	2016 Six Nations Championship
95	18 March 2017	Stade de France, Saint-Denis	20–18	France	2017 Six Nations Championship
96	17 March 2018	Millennium Stadium, Cardiff	14–13	Wales	2018 Six Nations Championship
97	1 February 2019	Stade de France, Saint-Denis	19–24	Wales	2019 Six Nations Championship
98	20 October 2019	Ōita Stadium, Ōita (Japan)	20–19	Wales	2019 Rugby World Cup
99	22 February 2020	Millennium Stadium, Cardiff	23–27	France	2020 Six Nations Championship
100	24 October 2020	Stade de France, Saint-Denis	38–21	France	2020 Autumn International
101	20 March 2021	Stade de France, Saint-Denis	32–30	France	2021 Six Nations Championship
102	11 March 2022	Millennium Stadium, Cardiff	9–13	France	2022 Six Nations Championship
103	18 March 2023	Stade de France, Saint-Denis	41–28	France	2023 Six Nations Championship
104	10 March 2024	Millennium Stadium, Cardiff	24–45	France	2024 Six Nations Championship
105	31 January 2025	Stade de France, Saint-Denis	43–0	France	2025 Six Nations Championship
106	15 February 2026	Millennium Stadium, Cardiff	12–54	France	2026 Six Nations Championship

== XV results ==
Below is a list of matches that France has awarded matches test match status by virtue of awarding caps, but Wales did not award caps.

Date	Venue	Score	Winner	Competition
22 December 1945	St. Helen's, Swansea	8–0	Wales XV	Victory International
22 April 1946	Stade Yves-du-Manoir, Colombes	12–0	France XV	Victory International
