= Mick Hillary =

Irish rugby union player

- Full name: Michael Francis Hillary
- Born: 6 June 1925 British Malaya
- Died: 10 February 2014 (aged 88)

Rugby union career
- Position: Wing three-quarter
International career
Years	Team	Apps	(Points)
1952	Ireland	1	(0)

Michael Francis Hillary (6 June 1925 — 10 February 2014) was an Irish international rugby union player.

Hillary was a University College Dublin and Leinster wing three-quarter, capped once for Ireland, playing against England at Twickenham during the 1952 Five Nations. He also featured in Ireland's 1952 tour of Argentina, scoring a try in the second match against the Pumas, for which caps weren't awarded.

== See also ==
- List of Ireland national rugby union players
