= Paul Traynor =

Paul Traynor may refer to:

- Paul Traynor (ice hockey)
- Paul Traynor (rugby union)
