= 1957 Five Nations Championship =

Season of five nations championship

- Date: 12 January - 23 March 1957
- Countries: England; Ireland; France; Scotland; Wales

Tournament statistics
- Champions: England (15th title)
- Grand Slam: England (7th title)
- Triple Crown: England (13th title)
- Matches played: 10

The 1957 Five Nations Championship was the twenty-eighth series of the rugby union Five Nations Championship. Including the previous incarnations as the Home Nations and Five Nations, this was the sixty-third series of the northern hemisphere rugby union championship. Ten matches were played between 12 January and 23 March. It was contested by England, France, Ireland, Scotland and Wales.

England won its 15th title, winning also the Grand Slam, the Triple Crown and the Calcutta Cup.

== Participants ==
The teams involved were:

| Nation | Venue | City | Captain |
|---|---|---|---|
| England | Twickenham | London | Eric Evans |
| France | Stade Olympique Yves-du-Manoir | Colombes | Michel Celaya |
| Ireland | Lansdowne Road | Dublin | Noel Henderson |
| Scotland | Murrayfield | Edinburgh | Jim Greenwood/Arthur Smith |
| Wales | National Stadium | Cardiff | Malcolm Thomas/Rees Stephens |

== Table ==
| Pos | Team | Pld | W | D | L | PF | PA | PD | Pts |
|---|---|---|---|---|---|---|---|---|---|
| 1 | England | 4 | 4 | 0 | 0 | 34 | 8 | +26 | 8 |
| 2 | Wales | 4 | 2 | 0 | 2 | 31 | 30 | +1 | 4 |
| 2 | Ireland | 4 | 2 | 0 | 2 | 21 | 21 | 0 | 4 |
| 2 | Scotland | 4 | 2 | 0 | 2 | 21 | 27 | −6 | 4 |
| 5 | France | 4 | 0 | 0 | 4 | 24 | 45 | −21 | 0 |

== Results ==
1957-01-12

| France | 0–6 | Scotland |

Paris

1957-01-19

| Wales | 0–3 | England |

Cardiff

1957-01-26

| Ireland | 11–6 | France |

Dublin

1957-02-02

| Scotland | 9–6 | Wales |

Edinburgh

1957-02-09

| Ireland | 0–6 | England |

Dublin

1957-02-23

| England | 9–5 | France |

London

1957-02-23

| Scotland | 3–5 | Ireland |

Edinburgh

1957-03-09

| Wales | 6–5 | Ireland |

Cardiff

1957-03-16

| England | 16–3 | Scotland |

London

1957-03-23

| France | 13–19 | Wales |

Paris
