= 1956 Five Nations Championship =

Rugby union competition

- Date: 14 January - 14 April 1956
- Countries: England; Ireland; France; Scotland; Wales

Tournament statistics
- Champions: Wales (13th title)
- Matches played: 10

The 1956 Five Nations Championship was the twenty-seventh series of the rugby union Five Nations Championship. Including the previous incarnations as the Home Nations and Five Nations, this was the sixty-second series of the northern hemisphere rugby union championship. Ten matches were played between 14 January and 14 April. It was contested by England, France, Ireland, Scotland and Wales.

== Participants ==
The teams involved were:

Nation	Venue	City	Captain
England	Twickenham	London	Eric Evans
France	Stade Olympique Yves-du-Manoir	Colombes	Gérard Dufau/Michel Celaya
Ireland	Lansdowne Road	Dublin	Jim Ritchie/Noel Henderson
Scotland	Murrayfield	Edinburgh	Angus Cameron/Jim Greenwood
Wales	National Stadium	Cardiff	Cliff Morgan

== Table ==
Pos	Team	Pld	W	D	L	PF	PA	PD	Pts
1	Wales	4	3	0	1	25	20	+5	6
2	England	4	2	0	2	43	28	+15	4
2	France	4	2	0	2	31	34	−3	4
2	Ireland	4	2	0	2	33	47	−14	4
5	Scotland	4	1	0	3	31	34	−3	2

== Results ==
1956-01-14

Scotland	12–0	France

Edinburgh

1956-01-21

England	3–8	Wales

London

1956-01-28

France	14–8	Ireland

Paris

1956-02-04

Wales	9–3	Scotland

Cardiff

1956-02-11

England	20–0	Ireland

London

1956-02-25

Ireland	14–10	Scotland

Dublin

1956-03-10

Ireland	11–3	Wales

Dublin

1956-03-17

Scotland	6–11	England

Edinburgh

1956-03-24

Wales	5–3	France

Cardiff

1956-03-24

France	14–9	England

Paris
