= Paddy Lawlor =

Irish rugby union player

- Full name: Patrick John Lawlor
- Born: 21 March 1928 Dublin, Ireland
- Died: 26 May 2015 (aged 87) Barcelona, Spain

Rugby union career
- Position: Lock
International career
| Years | Team | Apps | (Points) |
| 1951–56 | Ireland | 12 | (3) |

Patrick John Lawlor (21 March 1928 — 26 May 2015) was an Irish international rugby union player.

Born in Dublin, Lawlor was the elder brother of Olympic hammer thrower John Lawlor.

Lawlor, a lock, played much of his rugby with Clontarf and was a Leinster representative player. He won 12 Ireland caps, debuting against Scotland at Murrayfield during their championship-winning 1951 Five Nations campaign. His international career included Ireland's 1952 tour of South America, where he made an uncapped appearance against Argentina.

== See also ==
- List of Ireland national rugby union players
