= 1958 Five Nations Championship =

Rugby union competition

- Date: 11 January - 19 April 1958
- Countries: England; Ireland; France; Scotland; Wales

Tournament statistics
- Champions: England (16th title)
- Matches played: 10

The 1958 Five Nations Championship was the twenty-ninth series of the rugby union Five Nations Championship. Including the previous incarnations as the Home Nations and Five Nations, this was the sixty-fourth series of the northern hemisphere rugby union championship. Ten matches were played between January 11 and April 19. It was contested by England, France, Ireland, Scotland and Wales.

== Participants ==
The teams involved were:

Nation	Venue	City	Captain
England	Twickenham	London	Eric Evans
France	Stade Olympique Yves-du-Manoir	Colombes	Michel Celaya/Maurice Prat
Ireland	Lansdowne Road	Dublin	Noel Henderson
Scotland	Murrayfield	Edinburgh	Arthur Smith/Jim Greenwood
Wales	National Stadium	Cardiff	Clem Thomas

== Table ==
Pos	Team	Pld	W	D	L	PF	PA	PD	Pts
1	England	4	2	2	0	26	6	+20	6
2	Wales	4	2	1	1	26	28	−2	5
3	France	4	2	0	2	36	37	−1	4
4	Scotland	4	1	1	2	23	32	−9	3
5	Ireland	4	1	0	3	24	32	−8	2

== Results ==
1958-01-11

Scotland	11–9	France

Edinburgh
Attendance: 50,000

1958-01-18

England	3–3	Wales

London

1958-02-01

Wales	8–3	Scotland

Cardiff

1958-02-08

England	6–0	Ireland

London

1958-03-01

France	0–14	England

Paris
Attendance: 33,254

1958-03-01

Ireland	12–6	Scotland

Dublin

1958-03-15

Ireland	6–9	Wales

Dublin

1958-03-15

Scotland	3–3	England

Edinburgh
Attendance: 60,000

1958-03-29

Wales	6–16	France

Cardiff
Attendance: 60,000

1958-04-19

France	11–6	Ireland

Paris
Attendance: 25,043
