= Audenshaw School =

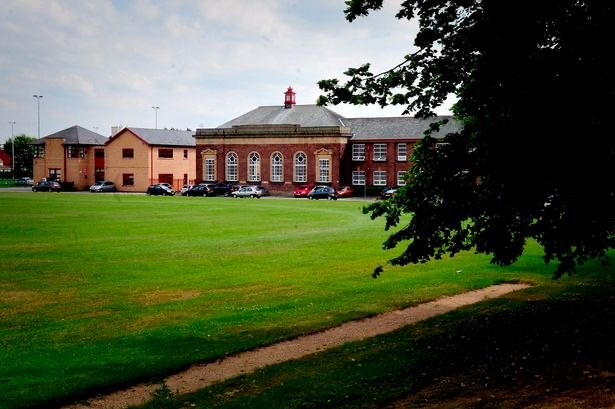
- School badge Audenshaw School building

Location
- Hazel Street; Audenshaw, Manchester, M34 5NB; England; 53.4668°N 2.1188°W

Information
- Type: Academy
- Motto: Carpe Diem (Seize the Day)
- Established: 1932
- Specialist: Rugby
- Department for Education URN: 136273 Tables
- Ofsted: Reports
- Principal
- Gender: Boys
- Age: 11 to 16
- Enrolment: 1,178
- Colours: Red, white and black
- Website: http://www.audenshawschool.org.uk/

Audenshaw School is an 11–16 all-boys secondary school in Audenshaw, Greater Manchester, England. Originally, the school was known as Audenshaw Grammar School when established, and it opened to boys on 29 July 1932 with an enrolment of 300 boys. By January 2025, 1,136 boys attended the school.

== History ==
=== Audenshaw Grammar School for Boys ===
On 29 July 1932, Audenshaw Grammar School for Boys was opened, providing facilities for 300 pupils. "The school officially opened on Saturday July 23rd at 3.00 pm when the contractors handed the keys to County Alderman J. T. Travis Clegg DL JP. The school remained open until 7:00 pm for inspection by the general public. On 13 September 1932, seventy-six boys walked through the gates of a brand new Grammar School on Hazel Street Audenshaw."

The first Head Master was John Lord, who was in charge until 1953. He was followed by Ronald Porter, who had joined the school from Stretford Grammar School. Kenneth Exley became Headmaster in 1961, having previously been Headmaster at the Creighton School for Boys in Carlisle.

=== World War II ===
A number of old boys and a master were killed during active service during World War II. Their names are remembered on the Roll of Honour in the main hall, which carries the inscription "Remember with Pride and Gratitude":

- E T Alwood RN
- W Bradley RA (a master)
- L Carr MN
- H W Cooper RAF
- T Cusack MN
- E Davy RAC
- A B Fawcett RAF
- E J Hartley RAF
- J L Harvey MN
- J Heyworth RAF
- W Hooper RAF
- K Howard RAF
- J Key RAF
- D J Kilner RAF
- A E Leach RAF
- C C Procter RAF
- D Ryan RAF
- F T M Sidebotham RAF
- P S Thomas RAF
- J D Thornton RAF

=== Post–World War II ===
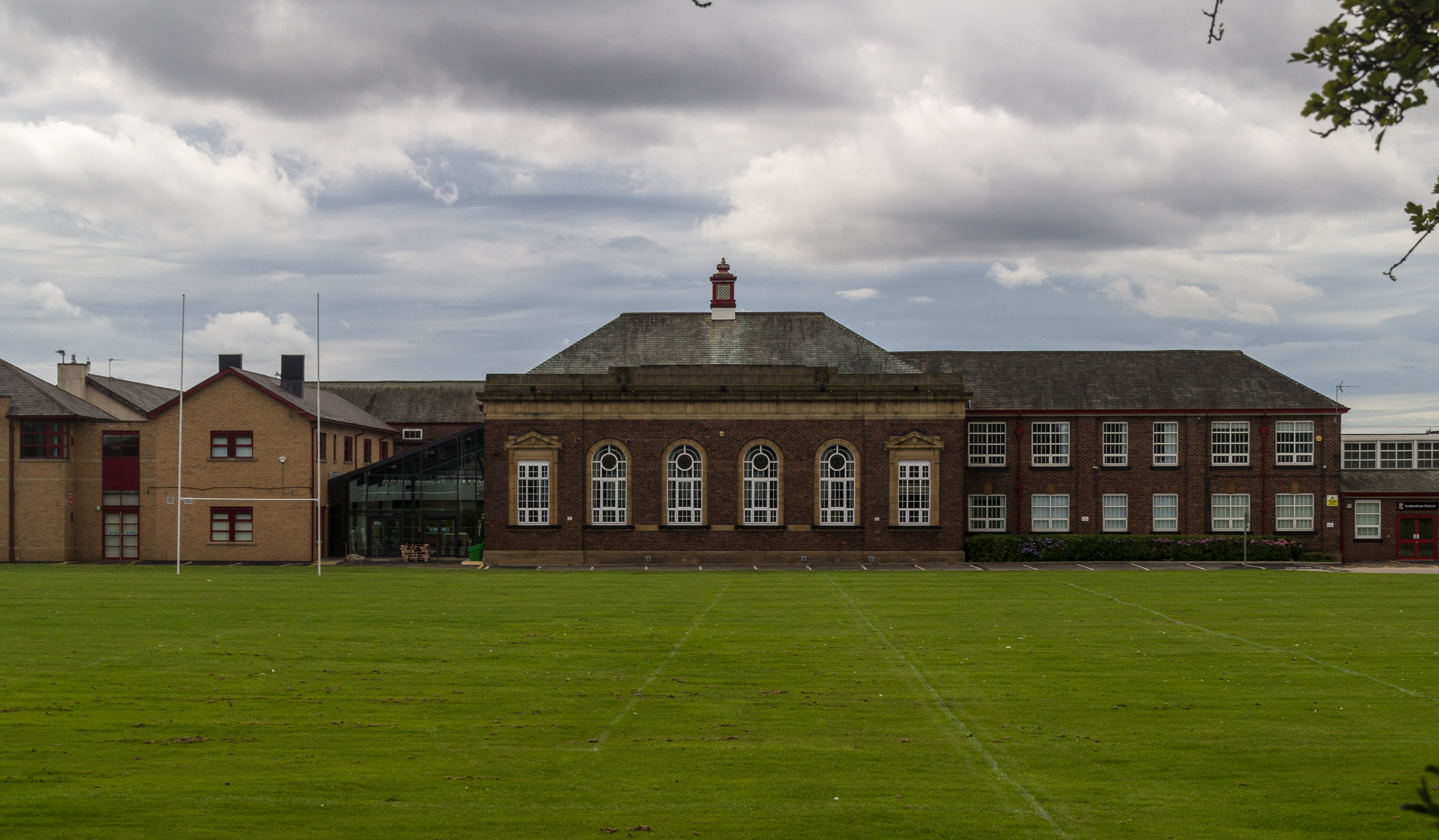
Audenshaw School building from the front

The Queen Mother visited the school in 1959 to present colours to the Manchester Regiment. In 1981, Graham Locke OBE succeeded Exley as Head Master. Locke was Head Master until his sudden death in 1994; the school's sports hall is named in his memory. Locke was later appointed to the Order of the British Empire for his role for services to education. Alan Crompton was Head Master from 1994 to 2005, whereupon he retired. Crompton had previously worked at Copley High School in Stalybridge. When Crompton retired he was succeeded by Stephen Turner, who joined the school having been Head at Golborne High School in Wigan – he retired in 2012. In 2021 former headteacher Janette Saw left her role having been the Principal since 2013. The current Principal is Peter Taylor who has been in charge since January 2022. On 30 April 2025, it was announced that Peter Taylor would leave his role in August 2025.

In the mid-1960s, pupils of Audenshaw Grammar School formed a branch of the Peak Forest Canal Restoration Society. Founding members W. Lear, N. Markham, and W. Morgan began their efforts in the summer of 1965 with the objective of cleaning, restoring and reopening the then derelict Ashton Canal. Successful in their ambitious aim, the canal was eventually reopened on 13 May 1974 by Denis Howel, then Member of Parliament for Birmingham Small Heath and the Minister for Sport. Audenshaw Grammar School lost its sixth form in the late 1970s due to ‘reorganisation’ within the LEA. However, an adjoining sixth form college was opened in 1997, the same year the school was granted foundation school status but this time it was co-educational rather than single-sex, gaining fairly mixed results. The school became a fully comprehensive school in the late 1970s.

In 1989, Audenshaw became one of the first Grant Maintained (GM) schools in England under the leadership of Locke and the then Chair of Governors T. Hall. The school had faced the threat of a merger and then closure. The LEA attempted to sell the school land but a High Court ruling overturned this action. The school opted out of LEA control in 1988; parents voted for the maintenance – 86% of those eligible voted; 91% of them voting in favour of the school receiving grant maintenance. This followed the Parents Action Group campaign. Since then the school has grown and has become one of the most popular schools in Tameside. Mr T Hall was awarded the MBE for services to Education and he remains the Chair of Governors.

In 1999, Audenshaw School won the inaugural – and only – schools' series of Channel 4's daytime quiz show Fifteen to One.

In 2007, the school celebrated its 75th anniversary with a visit by the Princess Royal who officially opened the Sixth Form extension.

=== Audenshaw School (Academy status) ===
Audenshaw School converted to academy status in September 2010. The sixth form was announced to close in 2018. It has now been changed into the school’s maths department.

== Noted alumni ==
Sporting

- Eric Evans (1921–1991): captained England's rugby team
- Danny Hall (b. 1983): Professional footballer who has played for Gretna, Oldham Athletic and Shrewsbury Town among others.
- John O'Driscoll (b. 1953): Ireland international and British Lions rugby player of the 1970s and 1980s
- Stephen Parry: (b. 1986) Lancashire and England cricketer.
- Zach Clough (b. 1995): Professional footballer currently playing for Adelaide United. Who has previously played for Bolton Wanderers, Nottingham Forest and Wigan Athletic among others.
- Dean Schofield (b. 1979): plays professional rugby for Sale Sharks and England Saxons (England A)
- James Tunnicliffe (b. 1989): Professional footballer currently playing for Stockport.
- Gene Ormsby (b. 1992): Former professional rugby player

Other

- Robert Shakespeare (b 1982): Designer of Olympic weightlifting 50p.
- Mark Hunter (b. 1957): MP for Cheadle since 2005
- Mick Hucknall (b. 1960): lead singer of the band Simply Red
- Sir Alexander Markham: Professor of Medicine at the University of Leeds, Director of the Molecular Medicine Institute at St James's University Hospital
- Col Needham (b. 1967): Founder and CEO of IMDb
- Sir Ralph Riley (1924–1999): botanist and geneticist
