= Archie O'Leary =

Irish rugby union player

Arthur O'Leary
- Full name: Arthur Finbarr O'Leary
- Born: 30 November 1929 Cork, Ireland
- Died: 21 May 2016 (aged 86) Marymount, Cork, Ireland
- School: Presentation Brothers College
- Notable relative: Peter O'Leary (grandson)
- Occupation: Insurance executive

Rugby union career
- Position: Lock
International career
Years	Team	Apps	(Points)
1952	Ireland	3	(0)

Arthur Finbarr O'Leary (30 November 1929 — 21 May 2016) was an insurance executive and rugby union player.

== Biography ==
Born and raised in Cork, O'Leary was the son of a doctor and attended Presentation Brothers College.

O'Leary played his senior rugby with Highfield, Cork Constitution and Munster, while gaining three Ireland caps during the 1952 Five Nations, as a second-rower against Scotland, Wales and England.

An insurance broker, O'Leary founded O'Leary Insurances in 1961 and the company grew to become one of the country's largest independently owned brokerages, employing over 200 people.

O'Leary sailed for Ireland in the Admiral's Cup and his grandson Peter is a two-time Olympian.

Owner of several racehorses, O'Leary's most successful horse was Florida Pearl, which he co-owned with wife Violet.

== See also ==
- List of Ireland national rugby union players
