= Patrick Kavanagh (rugby union) =

Irish rugby union player and swimmer

- Full name: Patrick Joseph Kavanagh
- Born: 2 September 1929 Dublin, Ireland
- Died: 20 August 2015 (aged 85) South Dublin, Ireland
- School: Blackrock College
- University: University College Dublin
- Notable relative: Ronnie Kavanagh (brother)

Rugby union career
- Position: Flanker
International career
Years	Team	Apps	(Points)
1952–55	Ireland	2	(0)

Patrick Joseph Kavanagh (2 September 1929 — 20 August 2015) was an Irish rugby union player and swimmer.

Born in Dublin, Kavanagh was educated at Blackrock College and University College Dublin (UCD).

Kavanagh, a freestyle specialist, received his swimming tuition from Irish diving champion Eddie Heron. He was a five-time winner of the 100 metres freestyle at the Irish Championships and qualified for the 1948 Summer Olympics. After travelling to London for the Olympics, Kavanagh and his teammates were forced to withdraw at the last minute when the International Swimming Federation barred two of their squad from competing as they were from the north.

A Leinster Schools Cup-winner with Blackrock College, Kavanagh went on to play rugby at UCD and won two Ireland caps, against England at Twickenham in 1952 and Wales at Cardiff in 1955. His younger brother Ronnie was also an Ireland player and both were on the 1952 tour of South America, making uncapped appearances against Argentina.

== See also ==
- List of Ireland national rugby union players
