= Johnny O'Meara =

Irish rugby union player

- Full name: John Anthony O'Meara
- Born: 26 June 1929 Cork, Ireland
- Died: 10 September 2011 (aged 82) Castletownshend, Ireland
- School: Christian Brothers College; Clongowes Wood College
- University: University College Cork
- Occupation: Solicitor

Rugby union career
- Position: Scrum-half
International career
Years	Team	Apps	(Points)
1951–58	Ireland	22	(6)

John Anthony O'Meara (26 June 1929 — 10 September 2011) was an Irish rugby union international.

Born in Cork, O'Meara attended Christian Brothers College (Cork) and Clongowes Wood College.

O'Meara was a scrum-half, noted for his fast and fluid passing. He formed a halfback partnership with Jack Kyle in the Ireland team during the 1950s and they featured together in 19 of O'Meara's 22 Test appearances. His career included a Five Nations title in 1951, his debut Ireland season, as well as a tour of Argentina in 1952, which coincided with the death of Eva Perón. He won two Munster Senior Cups with University College Cork.

A competitive sailor, O'Meara represented Ireland at the 505 World Championships held in France in 1956.

O'Meara, a solicitor by profession, was a partner in the Cork firm Barry O’Meara & Son.

== See also ==
- List of Ireland national rugby union players
