= Michael Dargan =

Irish cricketer (1928–2023)

Personal information
- Full name: Michael James Dargan
- Born: 9 October 1928; Dublin, Ireland
- Died: 17 June 2023 (aged 94); Dublin, Ireland
- Batting: Right-handed

Domestic team information
- Years: Team
- 1954: Ireland

Career statistics
Competition	First-class
Matches	1
Runs scored	10
Batting average	5.00
100s/50s	–/–
Top score	7
Catches/stumpings	3/–
- Source: Cricinfo, 2 January 2022

Michael James Dargan (9 October 1928 – 17 June 2023) was an Irish cricketer. A right-handed batsman, he played once for the Ireland cricket team, a first-class match against the MCC In September 1954. He is married to Freda Dargan. He also played two rugby union Test matches for Ireland In the 1952 Five Nations Championship. Dargan died in Booterstown in Dublin on 17 June 2023, at the age of 94.
