= Richard Chambers (rugby union) =

Northern Ireland rugby union player (1927–2020)

- Full name: Richard Rodney Chambers
- Born: 15 August 1927 Belfast, Northern Ireland
- Died: 31 March 2020 (aged 92) Belfast, Northern Ireland
- University: Queen's University Belfast

Rugby union career
- Position: Centre
International career
Years	Team	Apps	(Points)
1951–52	Ireland	6	(0)

Richard Rodney Chambers (15 August 1927 — 31 March 2020) was an Irish international rugby union player.

Chambers was educated at Royal Belfast Academical Institution and Queen's University.

An Instonians centre, Chambers was capped six times for Ireland. He played all four matches of their championship-winning 1951 Five Nations campaign. The following year, Chambers played a further two Five Nations matches and toured South America, making two uncapped appearances against the Pumas.

Chambers, a barrister, was admitted to the bar in 1950 and became a County Court Judge in 1973.

== See also ==
- List of Ireland national rugby union players
