= Robin Gregg =

Rugby union player from Northern Ireland

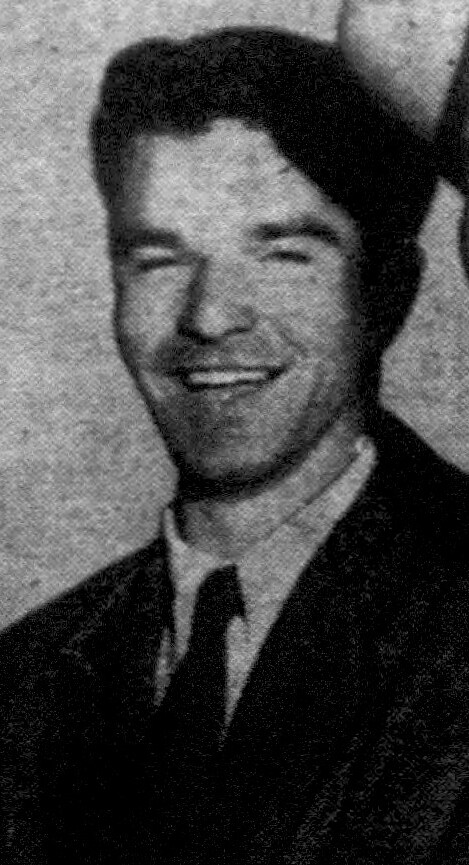
- Gregg in 1953
- Full name: Robin Johnston Gregg
- Born: 28 November 1930 Carnlough, County Antrim, Northern Ireland
- Died: 25 March 2021 (aged 90) Ballymena, Northern Ireland
- School: Ballymena Academy
- University: Queen's University Belfast

Rugby union career
- Position: Fullback
International career
Years	Team	Apps	(Points)
1953–54	Ireland	7	(12)

Robin Johnston Gregg (28 November 1930 — 25 March 2021) was an Irish international rugby union player.

A native of Carnlough, County Antrim, Gregg was educated at Ballymena Academy and Queen's University Belfast.

Gregg was capped seven times by Ireland as a fullback. He featured in all of Ireland's 1953 Five Nations matches and kicked four conversions in the win over Scotland at Murrayfield. His Ireland caps were gained while playing with Queen's University and after leaving the varsity team he joined hometown club Ballymena in 1955.

== See also ==
- List of Ireland national rugby union players
