= Jack Notley =

Irish rugby player (1926-1994)

- Full name: John Robert Notley
- Born: 25 June 1926 Drumsna, County Roscommon
- Died: 21 December 1994 (aged 68) Kilkenny, County Kilkenny

Rugby union career
- Position: Fullback / Centre
International career
Years	Team	Apps	(Points)
1952	Ireland	2	(2)

John Robert Notley (25 June 1926 — 21 December 1994) was an Irish international rugby union player.

Born in Drumsna, County Roscommon, Notley won two Ireland caps in the 1952 Five Nations. He played his rugby with Wanderers as a fly-half, a role that Jack Kyle occupied in the Ireland side, so Notley's international opportunities came out of position, as a fullback against France and centre against Scotland.

Notley represented Ireland in a two-day cricket match against Worcestershire in 1958 to became a dual-international.

In 1959, Notley scored the drop-goal that won Kilkenny the Leinster Towns Cup final against North Kildare.

== See also ==
- List of Ireland national rugby union players
