= Jim Ritchie (rugby union) =

Northern Ireland rugby union player (born 1926)

- Full name: James S. Ritchie
- Born: 11 December 1926 Belfast, Northern Ireland

Rugby union career
- Position: Flanker
International career
Years	Team	Apps	(Points)
1956	Ireland	2	(0)

James S. Ritchie (born 11 December 1926) is a former Ireland rugby union international from Northern Ireland.

Born in Belfast to Scottish parents, Ritchie was educated at Methodist College Belfast and played his early rugby as a centre three quarter for Collegians.

Ritchie was living in England during the 1950s and captained London Irish, where he became a back row forward. He won two County Championships with Middlesex and also appeared for the Barbarians.

In 1956, Ritchie not only received an Ireland call up for the Five Nations Championship, but was also appointed team captain. The incumbent captain Robin Thompson was recovering from appendicitis and the uncapped Ritchie, who had led the Probables in the Irish trials, was a surprise choice. He captained Ireland in the first two Five Nations matches, losses to France in Paris and England in London, after which he was dropped from the side.

Ritchie retired from rugby in 1958 due to a back injury.

== See also ==
- List of Ireland national rugby union players
