= Fuzzy Anderson =

Irish rugby union player

- Full name: Frederick Edmund Anderson
- Born: 29 August 1929 Belfast, Northern Ireland
- University: Queen's University Belfast

Rugby union career
- Position: Prop
International career
Years	Team	Apps	(Points)
1953–55	Ireland	13	(0)

Frederick Edmund "Fuzzy" Anderson (born 29 August 1929) is an Irish former international rugby union player.

Born in Belfast, Anderson was a forward who could play a variety of positions.

Anderson played his club rugby with Coleraine, Queen's University and North of Ireland.

Capped 13 times by Ireland, Anderson debuted in their 1953 Five Nations campaign and featured against the touring All Blacks in 1954. He was selected on the 1955 British Lions tour to South Africa, but had to withdraw due to a health condition, which also brought about his retirement.

Anderson immigrated to Australia.

In 2019, Anderson was named in the Queen's University Greatest XV.

== See also ==
- List of Ireland national rugby union players
