= John Smith (rugby union, born 1926) =

Rugby union player from Northern Ireland

- Full name: John Hartley Smith
- Born: 27 July 1926 Dungannon, Northern Ireland
- Died: 1 November 2006 (aged 80) Vancouver, Canada
- School: Methodist College Belfast
- University: Queen's University Belfast
- Occupation: Doctor

Rugby union career
- Position: Prop
International career
Years	Team	Apps	(Points)
1951–54	Ireland	12	(0)

John Hartley Smith (27 July 1926 — 1 November 2006) was an Irish international rugby union player.

Born in Dungannon, Co. Tyrone, Smith was educated at Methodist College Belfast and Queen's University Belfast, where he attained a medical degree. He played rugby for Collegians, London Irish, Queen's University RFC and Ulster.

Smith won 12 Ireland caps as a prop, playing all matches in their title-winning 1951 Five Nations campaign.

Married to a Canadian, Smith immigrated to Vancouver and held high-ranking positions in the British Columbia Ministry of Health, while remaining involved in rugby as an administrator.

== See also ==
- List of Ireland national rugby union players
