= Paul Traynor (rugby union) =

Irish rugby union player

Rugby union career
- Position: Lock
International career
Years	Team	Apps	(Points)
1952	Ireland	2	(0)

Paul Traynor was an Irish international rugby union player.

A native of County Wexford, Traynor was a Clontarf and Leinster player. He earned an Ireland call up for the 1952 tour of Argentina, where he featured in the second row for both Test matches against the Pumas.

Traynor wasn't capped for his international matches in Argentina, but in 2023 was amongst 12 players retrospectively awarded caps by the Irish Rugby Football Union, and the only one from the 1952 tour.

== See also ==
- List of Ireland national rugby union players
