= John Gwilliam =

Wales international rugby union player & schoolteacher (1923–2016)

- Born: John Albert Gwilliam; 28 February 1923 Pontypridd, Wales
- Died: 21 December 2016 (aged 93)
- School: Monmouth School
- University: Trinity College, Cambridge
- Occupation: teacher

Rugby union career
- Position: No 8
Amateur team(s)
Years	Team	Apps	(Points)
- Cambridge University R.U.F.C.
–	Edinburgh Wanderers		
–	Gloucester RFC		
–	Newport RFC		
–	London Welsh RFC		
–	Llanelli RFC		
–	London Wasps		
–	Barbarian F.C.		
International career
Years	Team	Apps	(Points)
1947–1954	Wales	23	(0)

John Albert Gwilliam (28 February 1923 – 21 December 2016) was a Welsh rugby union player and schoolteacher. As a "No. 8" he played international rugby for Wales and club rugby for Cambridge University, Edinburgh Wanderers, Gloucester, Newport, London Welsh, Llanelli and Wasps. He captained the Wales rugby union team when they achieved Grand Slam victories in the 1950 and 1952 Five Nations Championships.

== Early life ==
Gwilliam was born in Pontypridd, the son of Thomas Albert and Adela Audrey Gwilliam. He attended Monmouth School and went up to Trinity College, Cambridge in 1941 to read mathematics. After spending a year at Cambridge, he was commissioned as an officer in the Royal Tank Regiment and saw action in Europe. The historian Max Hastings reported an incident at Rathau where Gwilliam was carrying a small German soldier by the scruff of his neck. Asked why he didn't just shoot the man, Gwilliam purportedly replied "Oh no sir. Much too small".

== Career ==
After the war, Gwilliam played rugby union for Newport for two seasons, and returned to study at Cambridge where he played for the university. After leaving Cambridge he became a schoolmaster, initially at Glenalmond College, Perth from 1949 to 1952, and while in Scotland played for Edinburgh Wanderers.

He played in his first international game for Wales on 20 December 1947 against Australia. He went on to win 23 caps for Wales, including notable victories over Australia in 1947 and the All Blacks in 1953. Thirteen of these games were as captain, the first being in a win over England at Twickenham in 1950. Wales won the Triple Crown under his captaincy, but he was not available for the 1950 Lions tour of Australia and New Zealand.

He taught at Bromsgrove School between 1952 and 1956, when he played for Gloucester, becoming the first Gloucester player to captain his country. His last international game was against England on 16 January 1954. He was described "as physically imposing, quietly spoken, religious and austere – the phrase 'Cromwellian' tends to recur in descriptions." In 2005 he was inducted into the Welsh Sports Hall of Fame. He wrote a book Rugby Football Tactics

He later became Head of Lower School at Dulwich College (1956–63) and Headmaster of Birkenhead School from 1963 to 1988, where he is remembered for his disciplinary standards and his religious views.

== Personal life and death ==
He married Pegi Lloyd George in 1949 and had three sons and two daughters. He lived in retirement at Llanfairfechan, Gwynedd. He died at the age of 93 in December 2016.
