= Ronnie Kavanagh =

Irish rugby union player (1931–2021)

- Born: James Ronald Kavanagh; 1931 Dublin, Ireland
- Died: 13 July 2021 (aged 90) Dublin, Ireland
- School: Blackrock College
- University: University College Dublin

Rugby union career
Senior career
Years	Team	Apps	(Points)
- Wanderers
Provincial / State sides
Years	Team	Apps	(Points)
- Leinster
International career
Years	Team	Apps	(Points)
1953–1962	Ireland	35	

James Ronald "Ronnie" Kavanagh (1931 – 13 July 2021) was an Irish rugby union player. He played in the back row for Wanderers, Leinster and Ireland.

== Career ==
Kavanagh first came to prominence as a student at Blackrock College when he captained the college rugby team in the Leinster Senior Cup. He and his brothers, Paddy and Gene, all played in the back row for Wanderers, before all three brothers later played for Leinster. After a tour of South America with Ireland in 1952, Kavanagh won 35 caps for the national team between 1953 and 1962. He was inducted into the Rugby Writers’ of Ireland Hall of Fame in 2009 and in 2011 he was named in University College Dublin's Team of the Century.

== Personal life and death ==
A graduate of University College Dublin, Kavanagh was a chartered accountant and a successful businessman. He also was active in a property company with his two brothers and his son, Rees. Ronnie married Kathleen Knight in 1957. He died at his home surrounded my family in Sandycove on 13 July 2021.
