= Michel Celaya =

France international rugby union player

- Born: 4 July 1930 Biarritz, France
- Died: 2 January 2020 (aged 89) Biarritz, France
- Height: 6 ft 1 in (1.85 m)
- Weight: 205 lb (93 kg)

Rugby union career
- Position: Back-row
Senior career
Years	Team	Apps	(Points)
- Biarritz Olympique
International career
Years	Team	Apps	(Points)
1953–1961	France	50	(18)
- Correct as of 13 September 2020

Michel Celaya (4 July 1930 – 2 January 2020) was a French rugby union player who played back-row for the France national rugby union team and Biarritz Olympique.

== Early life and career ==
Michel Celaya was born on 4 July 1930 in Biarritz, France.

Celaya earned his first cap for the France national rugby union team on 28 February 1953.

He made a total of 50 official appearances for the French national team between 1953, and 1961.

Celaya was part of the French national team that won the Five Nations Championship in 1954, 1955, 1959, 1960 and 1961.

Celaya spent his entire club career at Biarritz Olympique.

== Death ==
Celaya died at the age of 89 on 2 January 2020, in Biarritz, France.
