= 1953 Five Nations Championship =

Rugby tournament

- Date: 10 January – 28 March 1953
- Countries: England; Ireland; France; Scotland; Wales

Tournament statistics
- Champions: England (14th title)
- Matches played: 10

The 1953 Five Nations Championship was the twenty-fourth series of the rugby union Five Nations Championship. Including the previous incarnations as the Home Nations and Five Nations, this was the fifty-ninth series of the northern hemisphere rugby union championship. Ten matches were played between 10 January and 28 March. It was contested by England, France, Ireland, Scotland and Wales. England won its 14th title.

== Participants ==
The teams involved were:

Nation	Venue	City	Captain
England	Twickenham	London	Nim Hall
France	Stade Olympique Yves-du-Manoir	Colombes	Jean Prat
Ireland	Lansdowne Road/Ravenhill	Dublin/Belfast	Jackie Kyle
Scotland	Murrayfield	Edinburgh	Arthur Dorward/Angus Cameron
Wales	National Stadium/St. Helens	Cardiff/Swansea	John Gwilliam/Bleddyn Williams

== Table ==
Pos	Team	Pld	W	D	L	PF	PA	PD	Pts
1	England	4	3	1	0	54	20	+34	7
2	Wales	4	3	0	1	26	14	+12	6
3	Ireland	4	2	1	1	54	25	+29	5
4	France	4	1	0	3	17	38	−21	2
5	Scotland	4	0	0	4	21	75	−54	0

== Results ==
10 January 1953

France	11–5	Scotland

Paris

17 January 1953

Wales	3–8	England

Cardiff

24 January 1953

Ireland	16–3	France

Belfast

7 February 1953

Scotland	0–12	Wales

Edinburgh

14 February 1953

Ireland	9–9	England

Dublin
Referee: Adam Austin

28 February 1953

England	11–0	France

London

28 February 1953

Scotland	8–26	Ireland

Edinburgh

14 March 1953

Wales	5–3	Ireland

Swansea

21 March 1953

England	26–8	Scotland

London

28 March 1953

France	3–6	Wales

Paris
