= Eric Evans (rugby union, born 1921) =

England international rugby union player

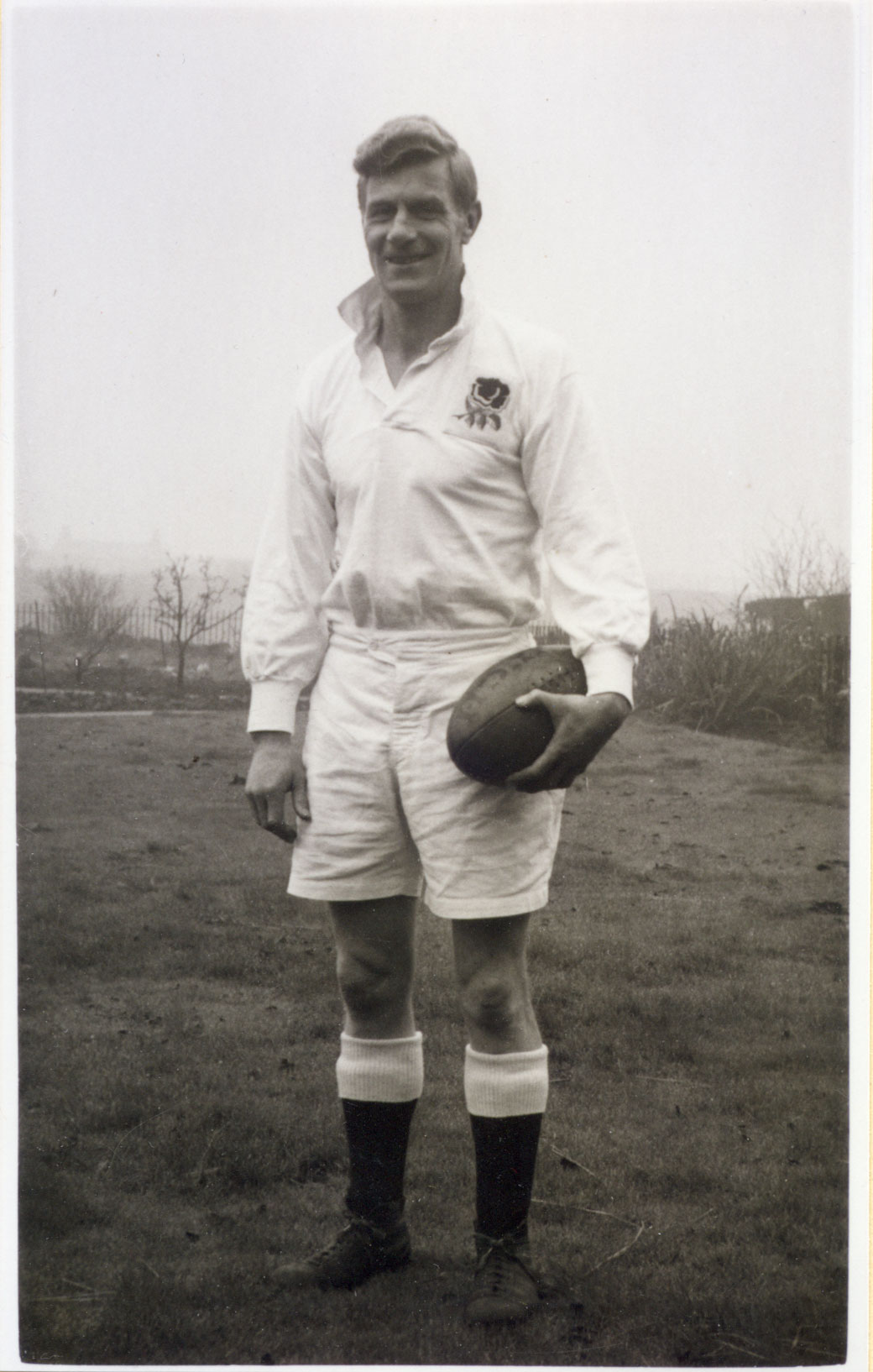
- Eric Evans
- Born: 1 February 1921 Droylsden, Lancashire, England
- Died: 12 January 1991 (aged 69)
- School: Audenshaw Grammar School
- Occupation: Sports Teacher

Rugby union career
- Position: Hooker
Amateur team(s)
| Years | Team | Apps | (Points) |
| 1935–1939 | Old Aldwinians | | |
| 1945–1963 | Sale | | |
International career
| Years | Team | Apps | (Points) |
| 1948–1958 | England | 30 | |
- Correct as of 28 December 2011

Eric Evans, MBE (1 February 1921 – 12 January 1991) was the captain of the England rugby union team from 1956 to 1958.

== Early life ==
Evans was born on Edge Lane in Droylsden and attended Audenshaw Grammar School. He first played for Old Aldwinians RUFC in the late 1930s and during the war joined Sale RUFC. After the war he qualified as a sports master at the then Loughborough College, later joining Openshaw Technical College in Manchester.

== England career ==
Evans was awarded his first England cap in 1948, becoming best known as a hooker. In 1956 he was named England captain at the age of 34, the oldest player to lead England, and in 1957 led his country to their first Grand Slam since 1928.

At the end of the 1957–8 season, he retired from international rugby, having been capped 30 times. Under his captaincy England won nine of their thirteen games.

== Post international career ==
Evans continued to play for Sale after his international retirement, finishing his playing career with them in the 1962–3 season. He was chairman of Old Aldwinians RUFC from 1957 to 1959 and president from 1960 to 1966.

In 1967, Evans became the first president of the Glengarth Sevens at Davenport Rugby Club, a position that he held for 21 years.

== Honours ==
On 15 June 1982, he received the Member of the Order of the British Empire from Her Majesty the Queen at Buckingham Palace. This award was for his career in Rugby Union Football and charitable work for the disabled at the Glengarth home for disabled children.
