= France national rugby union team =

National rugby union team representing France

France
- Nicknames: Le XV de France (The XV of France); Les Bleus (The Blues)
- Emblem: Gallic rooster
- Union: Fédération Française de Rugby
- Head coach: Fabien Galthié
- Captain: Antoine Dupont
- Most caps: Fabien Pelous (118)
- Top scorer: Thomas Ramos (563)
- Top try scorer: Damian Penaud (41)
- Home stadium: Stade de France
First colours	Second colours

World Rugby ranking
- Current: 4 (as of 23 February 2026)
- Highest: 1 (2022)
- Lowest: 10 (2018)

First international
- France 8–38 New Zealand (Paris, France; 1 January 1906)

Biggest win
- France 96–0 Namibia (Marseille, France; 21 September 2023)

Biggest defeat
- New Zealand 61–10 France (Wellington, New Zealand; 9 June 2007)

World Cup
- Appearances: 10 (first in 1987)
- Best result: Runners-up (1987, 1999, 2011)
Medal record
Men's rugby
Silver medal – second place	1920 Antwerp	Team
Silver medal – second place	1924 Paris	Team
- Website: ffr.fr/xv-de-france

The France national rugby union team (French: Équipe de France de rugby à XV, pronounced [ekip də fʁɑ̃s də ʁyɡbi a kɛ̃z]) represents France in men's international rugby union matches. Colloquially known as Le XV de France (French for "The XV of France") or Les Bleus (French for "The Blues"), the team is governed by the French Rugby Federation (FFR; Fédération française de rugby). They traditionally wear blue shirts with a Gallic rooster on the chest, white shorts and red socks in reference to the French national flag. They mostly play home matches at the Stade de France in Saint-Denis, near Paris. They compete in the annual Six Nations Championship along with England, Ireland, Italy, Scotland and Wales. France have won the tournament 28 times (including 8 shared victories), and this includes winning the Grand Slam 10 times.

Rugby was introduced to France in 1872 by the British before a first France national team was formed in 1893, as a selection of the best Parisian club players under the governance of the USFSA, to face a club in England. A few years later, on New Year's Day 1906, the national team played its first test match against New Zealand in Paris. France then played sporadically against the Home Nations until they joined them in 1910 to form the Five Nations Championship. France also competed in the rugby competitions at early Summer Olympics, winning the gold medal in 1900 and two silver medals in the 1920s. The national team came of age during the 1950s and 1960s, winning their first Five Nations title outright in 1959. They won their first Grand Slam in 1968. Their latest championship win was in 2026 under head coach Fabien Galthié, who is also a former captain of the team.

France has competed in every Rugby World Cup since it began in 1987, and have qualified for the knock-out stage each time. They have reached the final three times, losing to New Zealand in 1987 and 2011, and to Australia in 1999. France hosted the 2007 Rugby World Cup, where, as in 2003, they were beaten in the semi-finals by England. In 2023 they hosted for a second time but lost in the quarter-final to the eventual champions South Africa (28–29).

== History ==
Rugby was introduced to France in 1872 by English merchants and students. On 26 February 1890, a French rugby team recruited from the Lycée Janson de Sailly defeated an international team at the Bois de Boulogne.

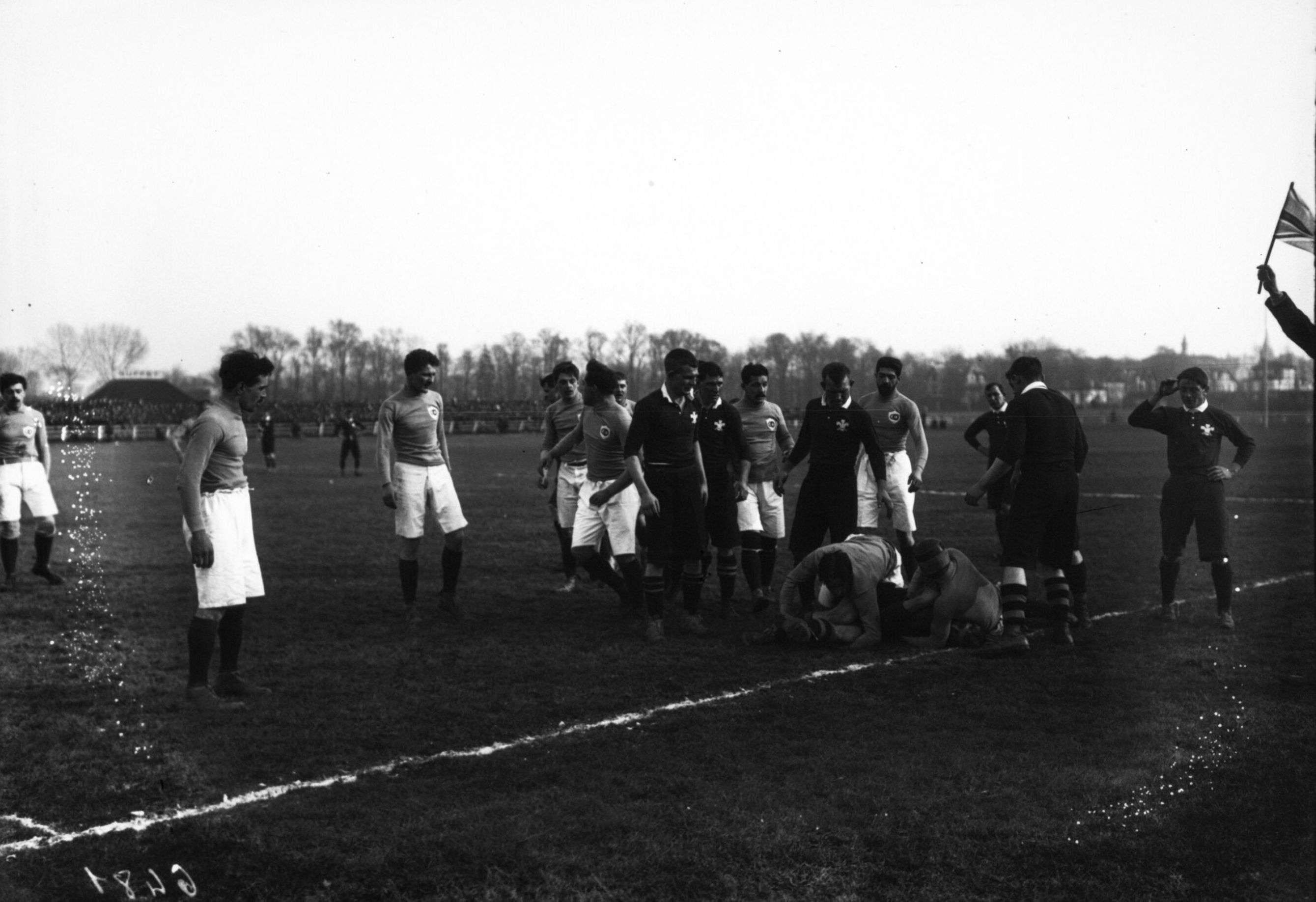
France playing Wales in the 1909 test match

Although France were represented at the 1900 Summer Olympics, their first official test match did not take place until New Year's Day 1906, against the New Zealand All Blacks in Paris. France then played intermittently against the Home Nations until they joined them to form the Five Nations tournament in 1910. In 1913 France faced South Africa's Springboks for the first time; losing 38–5. France also competed at the 1920 and 1924 Summer Olympics, and on both occasions lost to the United States in the gold medal match.

France were ejected from the Five Nations in 1932 after being accused of professionalism in the French leagues at a time when rugby union was strictly amateur. Forced to play against weaker opposition, France went on a winning streak; winning ten games in a row during the years from 1931 to 1936. France was invited to rejoin the Five Nations in 1939 but did not compete until 1947 as international rugby was suspended during World War II.

French rugby came of age during the 1950s and 1960s: they won their first Five Nations championship and completed a successful tour of South Africa. Their first championship was won in 1954 when they shared the title with England and Wales. France won their first outright Five Nations championship in 1959; they won with two wins, a draw (against England) and a defeat (against Ireland).

France first toured South Africa winning the test series in 1958. The Springboks also visited Paris in 1961, the test was not completed due to onfield fighting among the players. France also toured New Zealand and Australia in 1961 losing both tests against the All Blacks but defeating Australia's Wallabies. They won their first Five Nations Grand Slam in 1968 by beating all four other competing teams, and won numerous titles in the following years.

In 1977, France won their second Grand Slam, fielding an unchanged side throughout the tournament and conceding no tries. They also defeated the All Blacks in Toulouse that year, but lost the return match in Paris. On Bastille Day, 1979 they defeated the All Blacks in New Zealand for the first time, at Eden Park in Auckland.

In 1981 the French clinched their third Grand Slam; at Twickenham against England. They again completed a Grand Slam in 1987 on the eve of the first Rugby World Cup hosted by Australia and New Zealand. In that tournament they came from behind numerous times to defeat the Wallabies in their semi-final, and faced the All Blacks in final at Eden Park, Auckland; France lost 29–9. They shared the Five Nations with Wales the next year, and also won it in 1989.

France hosted some of the tests during the 1991 World Cup, but were knocked out by England at the Parc des Princes (Paris) in the quarter-finals. France won the Five Nations championship in 1993. In 1994 France won a test series 2–0 in New Zealand. They were knocked out of the 1995 World Cup semi-finals by eventual champions the Springboks, but did win their third place play-off match against England. In November 1995, France played the All Blacks in two tests, winning the first 22–15 at Toulouse and losing the second 37–12 at Paris. France won back-to-back Grand Slams in 1997 and 1998. At the 1999 World Cup they defeated tournament favourites the All Blacks in the semi-finals, but lost to the Wallabies in the final.

The Five Nations Championship was expanded in 2000 to include Italy. In the now Six Nations Championship France won a Grand Slam in 2002. At the 2003 World Cup in Australia they qualified for the semi-finals where they were defeated by eventual champions England. In 2004, they won a second Six Nations Grand Slam, which was followed by a Championship win in 2006 and a successful defence in 2007.

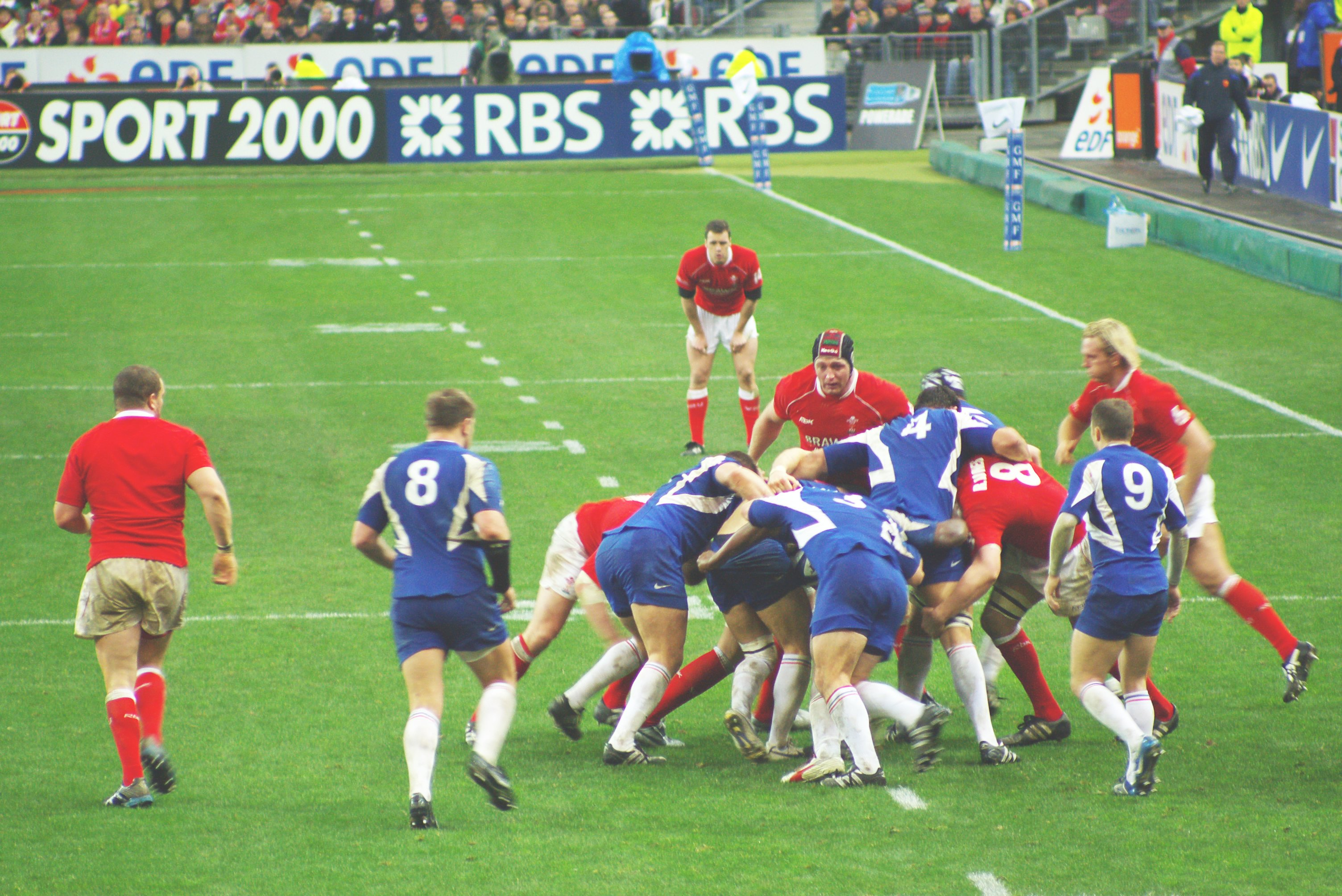
France playing Wales during the Six Nations Championship

In the 2007 Rugby World Cup, they finished second in their pool. They beat Namibia (87–10), Ireland (25–3), Georgia (64–7), but lost to Argentina (12–17). In the quarter-final, they defeated New Zealand (20–18), but lost to England in the semi-final (9–14). In the 3rd place playoff match, they lost to Argentina (10–34). In 2010, France won their 9th grand slam.

In the 2011 Six Nations Championship, they beat Scotland (34–21), Ireland (25–22), Wales (28–9), but lost to England (9–17) and Italy (21–22). They finished in 2nd place. In the 2011 Rugby World Cup, France finished second in their pool. They defeated Japan (47–21), Canada (46–19) but lost to New Zealand (17–37) and suffered a shock defeat to Tonga (14–19). In the quarter-final, they defeated England (19–12), defeated Wales (9–8) in the semi-final but lost (7–8) to the All Blacks in the final. This was France's third loss in a row in a RWC final.

In the 2012 Six Nations Championship, France defeated Italy (30–12), Scotland (23–17), drew with Ireland (17–17), but lost to England (22–24) and Wales (9–16). They finished the tournament in 4th place. In the 2012 French tour of Argentina, they split the series 1–1. They lost the first test match (20–23) in Córdoba, but won the second test match (49–10) in Tucumán. In the 2012 Autumn Internationals, they defeated Australia (33–6), Argentina (39–22), and Samoa (22–14).

In the 2013 Six Nations Championship, France had a miserable campaign, they lost to Italy (18–23), Wales (6–16), England (13–23), drew with Ireland (13–13) and won against Scotland (23–16). They finished the tournament in last place and therefore received the wooden spoon. In the 2013 French tour of New Zealand, they lost all 3 test matches to the All Blacks. The first defeat was in Auckland (13–23), the second in Christchurch (0–30) and the third in New Plymouth (9–24). They were swept and lost the series 0–3. In the 2013 Autumn Internationals, they lost to New Zealand (19–26), defeated Tonga (38–18), before losing to South Africa (10–19).

In the 2014 Six Nations Championship, France defeated England (26–24), Italy (30–10), Scotland (19–17), but lost to Wales (6–27), and Ireland (20–22). They finished the tournament in 4th place. In the 2014 French tour of Australia, France were swept and lost the test series 0–3. They lost (13–39) in Sydney, (0–6) in Melbourne and (23–50) in Brisbane. In the 2014 Autumn Internationals, they defeated Australia (29–26), lost to Argentina (13–18), and won against Fiji (40–15).

In the 2015 Six Nations Championship, they beat Italy (29–0), Scotland (15–8) but lost to England (35–55), Wales (13–20) and Ireland (11–18). They finished in 4th place. In the 2015 Rugby World Cup, they finished second in their pool. They defeated Italy (32–10), Romania (38–11), Canada (41–18) but lost to Ireland (9–24). In the quarter-final, they suffered a heavy defeat to New Zealand (13–62).

In the 2016 Six Nations Championship, they defeated Italy (23–21), Ireland (10–9), but lost to Wales (10–19), Scotland (18–29), and England (21–31). They finished in 5th place. In the 2016 French tour of Argentina, the test series was split 1–1. They lost the first test match (19–30), but won the second match (27–0). In the 2016 Autumn Internationals, they lost to Australia (23–25), New Zealand (19–24) before defeating Samoa (52–8).

In the 2017 Six Nations Championship, France defeated Scotland (22–16), Italy (40–18), Wales (20–18), but lost to England (16–19), and Ireland (9–19). They finished in 3rd place. In the 2017 French tour of South Africa, the French lost the test series 0–3. They lost (14–37) in Pretoria, (15–37) in Durban and (12–35) in Johannesburg. In the 2017 Autumn Internationals, they lost to New Zealand (18–38), South Africa (17–18), and drew with Japan (23–23).

In the 2018 Six Nations Championship, France beat Italy (34–17), England (22–16), but lost to Ireland (13–15), Scotland (26–32), and Wales (13–14). They finished in 4th place. In the 2018 French tour of New Zealand, they lost the test series 0–3. They were defeated (11–52) in Auckland, (13–26) in Wellington, and (14–49) in Dunedin. In the 2018 Autumn Internationals, they lost to South Africa (26–29), Fiji (14–21) but won against Argentina (28–13).

In the 2019 Six Nations Championship, they beat Scotland (27–10), Italy (25–14), but lost to Wales (19–24), England (8–44), and Ireland (14–26). They finished in 4th place. In the 2019 Rugby World Cup, France finished second in their pool. They beat Argentina (23–21), United States (33–9), and Tonga (23–21). Their game against England was cancelled due to effects of Typhoon Hagibis. In the quarter-final, they were defeated by Wales (19–20).

In the 2020 Six Nations Championship, France defeated England (24–17), Italy (35–22), Wales (27–23), Ireland (35–27) but lost to Scotland (28–17). Despite finishing with the same record and points as England, they finished in 2nd place due to points difference. In the 2020 Autumn Nations Cup, they finished atop of their pool after beating Scotland (22–15), and Italy (36–5). Their match against Fiji was cancelled due to COVID-19 and France was awarded an automatic (28–0) bonus point victory. They faced England in the final but lost (19–22).

In the 2021 Six Nations Championship, they defeated Italy (50–10), Ireland (15–13), Wales (32–30) but lost to England (20–23), and Scotland (23–27). They finished in 2nd place. In the 2021 French tour of Australia, France lost the test series 1–2. They lost (21–23) in Brisbane, won (28–26) in Sydney before losing (30–33) again in Brisbane. In the 2021 Autumn Internationals, they defeated New Zealand (40–25), Georgia (41–15), and Argentina (29–20).

In the 2022 Six Nations Championship, France won their 10th grand slam. They defeated Italy (37–10), Ireland (30–24), Scotland (36–17), Wales (13–9), and England (25–13). They finished in first place and won their 26th championship. In the 2022 French tour of Japan, France won the test series 2–0. After winning (42–23) in Toyota and (25–20) in Tokyo, they ranked number One in the world for the first time in their history in July 2022. In the 2022 Autumn Internationals, France beat Australia (30–29), South Africa (30–26), and Japan (35–17). The French recorded a perfect season, winning all 10 matches in 2022. They are the first team since the 2013 All Blacks to win all their games in a calendar year.

In the 2023 Six Nations Championship, France failed to retain their title. They beat Italy (29–24), Scotland (32–21), England (53–10), Wales (41–28), but lost to the eventual winners Ireland (19–32). They finished in 2nd place. In the 2023 Summer Nation Series, they lost to Scotland (21–25), before bouncing back the next week and beating them (30–27). They also beat Fiji (34–17) and Australia (41–17). In the 2023 Rugby World Cup, France were the host's. They finished atop of their pool after beating New Zealand (27–13), Uruguay (27–12), Namibia (96–0), and Italy (60–7). In the quarter-final, they suffered a (28–29) defeat to the eventual champions South Africa. This is the second time that France have been eliminated from their own home World Cup in the knockout stages.

In 2024 Six Nations Championship, they defeated Scotland (20–16), Wales (45–24), England (33–31), drew with Italy (13–13) and lost to Ireland (17–38). They finished in 2nd place. In the 2024 French tour of South America, they faced Argentina and Uruguay. They beat Argentina (28–13) in Mendoza, Uruguay (43–28) in Montevideo, before losing to Argentina in their second test match (25–33) in Buenous Aires. In the 2024 Autumn Internationals, they defeated New Zealand (30–29), Japan (52–12), Argentina (37–23).

In 2025, they toured New Zealand and lost all three matches in the series (27–31, 17–43, 19–29).

== Team image ==
=== Colours and kits ===
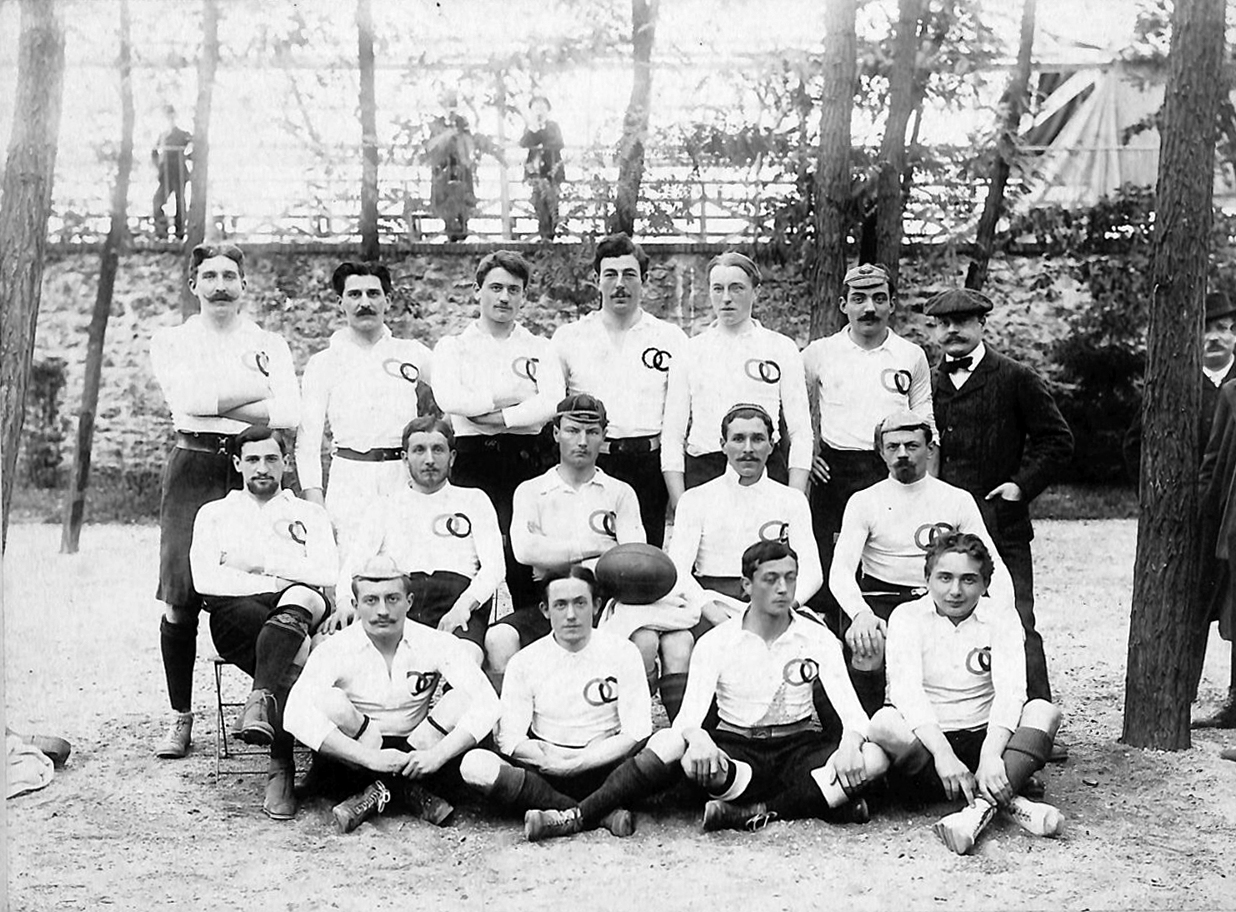
France in their first shirt before playing Great Britain in October 1900

Until 1912, the strip (uniform) of the French team was white with two rings (the symbol of USFSA, the body that ruled the sport in France by then). After the first game won by France against Scotland in 1911, France's captain Marcel Communeau asked that the team adopt the coq gaulois (Gallic rooster), historical emblem of France, as its symbol. The Gallic rooster was probably chosen partly because it is considered as a proud and combative animal that can be sometimes aggressive, although it had been used previously as a symbol by French teams – a former association football player, Jean Rigal, wore a uniform with this emblem as early as May 1910. The badge was initially white and red, but was altered to a multicoloured, embroidered image after 1945, and has been golden since 1970.

The symbol used by the French rugby team was a great success, and was later adopted by the French delegation at the Olympic Games of 1920 where the rooster was perched on five Olympic rings. The rooster has since become a well-known symbol of French teams. French players are sometimes called les coqs and some French supporters have been known to release roosters on the playing field before games.

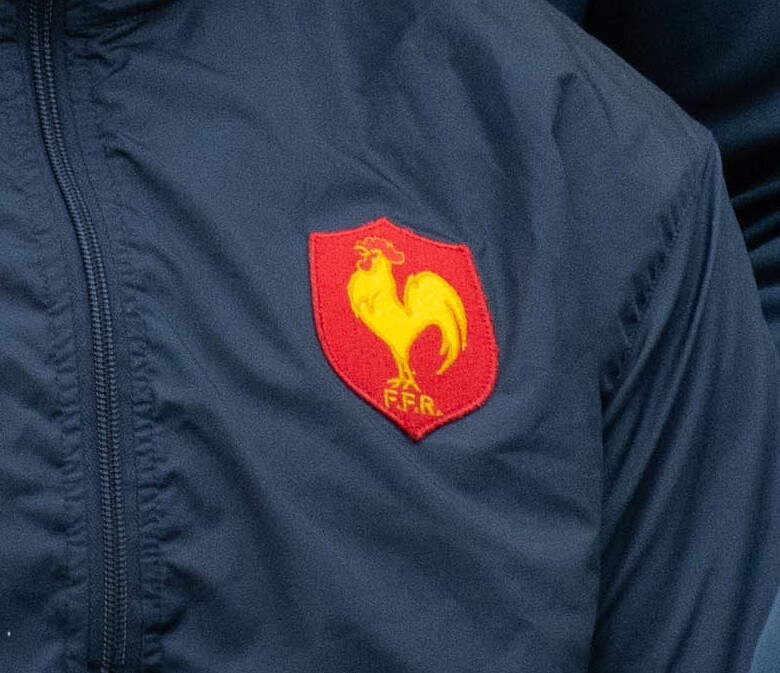
Previous Gallic rooster crest used from 1998 to 2019

The French team traditionally played in blue shirts, white shorts, and red socks, the colors of the national flag, and as such were nicknamed Les Tricolores (French for "The Tricoloured" or "The Red, White and Blues"). Due to the mostly blue strip the French team currently wears, the team is now often referred to as Les Bleus (French for "The Blues"), like many other French sporting teams. When this strip clashes with that of their opponents, such as in games against Scotland and Italy, French players wear white. New strips were developed for the 2007 World Cup, one of which is a darker blue. In June 2011 they relaunched another kit which they wear blue shirt with a black and navy gradation, blue shorts and blue socks for their home kit and they wear white shirt, white shorts and white socks for their away kit.

In 2011, French Rugby Federation (FFR) announced that Adidas would be their new partner for a period of six years, with them taking over production of the France national rugby shirt from 1 July 2012 to 30 June 2018.

Led by newly elected president Bernard Laporte, the federation intended on selling the jersey to a sponsor. The FFR announced on 24 January 2017 that they had started the commercialisation of the jersey. In February, it was decided that the jersey would first be used to support France's bid for the 2023 World Cup by showing #France2023 on the front of the kit. In March 2017, the Groupe Altrad showed its support for France's bid for the World Cup and the company's logo accompanied #France2023 on the jersey. The group became the first private company in history that appeared on the France national team kits. As of 2017 and France's successful bid to host the World Cup, Groupe Altrad signed a contract with the FFR, appearing solely on the jerseys.

In 2017, the FFR announced that Le Coq Sportif would once again be their supplier for a period of six years, with them taking over production of the France national rugby shirt from July 2018 to June 2024. On 28 June 2019, the Federation unveiled a new France Rugby logo which replaced the red and golden rooster and the previous governing body abstract logo. The red and stylised rooster was designed in order to be used as France teams' crest and FFR badge. A few months before the 2023 World Cup kick-off, incoming FFR president Florian Grill announced Adidas' return as France's kit manufacturer from June 2024.

==== Kit suppliers ====
Period	Kit manufacturer	Main shirt sponsor
1970–1975	Le Coq Sportif	—
1976–1979	Adidas	—
1980–1986	Le Coq Sportif	—
1985–1986	Nike	—
1986–1998	Adidas	—
1998–2012	Nike	—
2012–2017	Adidas	—
2017–2018	Adidas	Groupe Altrad
2018–2024	Le Coq Sportif	Groupe Altrad
2024–2028	Adidas	TBA

==== Kits timeline ====
First matches	Circa 1915	1960	1970	1985–86	1987 WC	1991 WC	1995 WC

1999–2001 (1999 WC)	2003–05 (2003 WC)	2007–09 (2007 WC)	2010–11 (2010 G. Slam)	2011–12 (2011 WC)	2015–16 (2015 WC)	2019–20 (2019 WC)	2021–22 (2022 G. Slam)

=== Media coverage ===
France's autumn internationals and Six Nations Championship matches are televised by public free-to-air national broadcaster France Télévisions (especially by the main channel France 2) since 1975. French viewers can therefore follow and see a total of eight France national games without any charges. The summer test matches meanwhile are fairly often televised by pay television channel Canal+ while the World Cup matches are broadcast by private free-to-air TF1. However, TF1 Group, France Télévisions and Groupe M6 announced details of a joint 2023 World Cup coverage, where each game of the tournament will be quite equally aired across three broadcasters. TF1 will broadcast 20 matches including most of the knockout phase and France matches, France 2 will air 10 matches including the France fixture against Namibia while M6 will televise a total of 18 matches.

France matches are also broadcast with full commentary on many public and private radio stations such as RMC, Sud Radio or local generalist France Bleu branches. Furthermore, most of French daily and weekly newspapers follow the France national team just like sport specialist L'Équipe and especially rugby-focused Midi Olympique that is published every Monday and Friday.

As of June 2023, the French Rugby Federation social media (rebranded as France Rugby) had more than 800,000 followers on Facebook and Twitter, and over 700,000 on Instagram. France Rugby also posts videos of trainings and game weeks on its YouTube channel, where viewers can witness the players and staff routine in web series.

== Home grounds ==
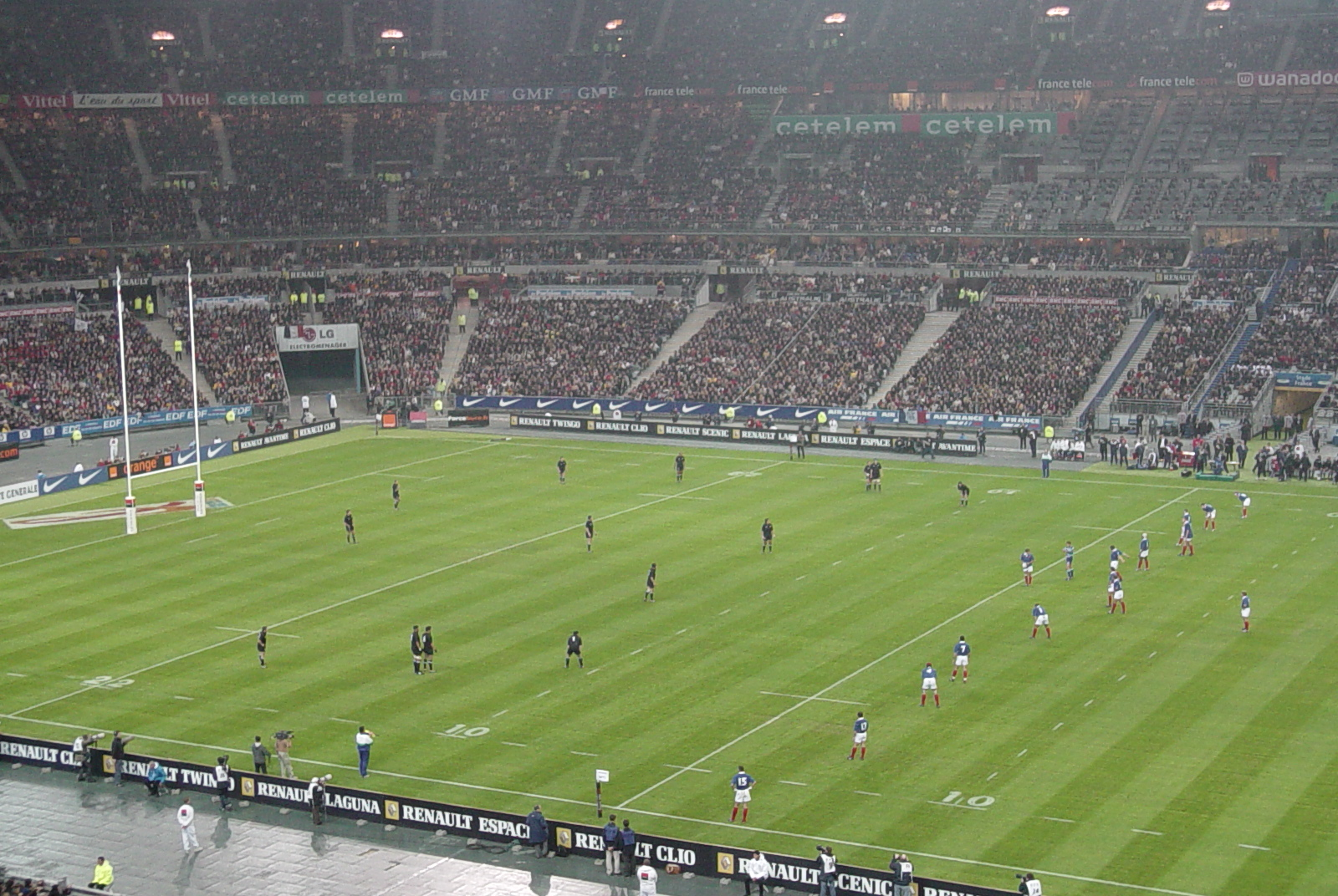
France hosting the All Blacks at the Stade de France located in Saint-Denis, near Paris

Historically, France played internationals at venues such as the Parc des Princes and the Stade Olympique de Colombes, both in Paris. The Stade Olympique de Colombes was the main venue for the 1924 Summer Olympics, where rugby was a sport.

Ever since moving out of Parc des Princes at the end of 1997, France's main home venue has been the Stade de France in Saint-Denis, where their home Six Nations matches are played. It has a capacity of 80,000. Since 2005, France has also played home internationals at the following venues around the country: Stade Chaban-Delmas, Grand Stade Lille Métropole (now known as Stade Pierre-Mauroy), Stade Gerland, Stade Vélodrome, Stade de la Mosson, Stade de la Beaujoire, Stade Bonal, Stadium Municipal (Toulouse) and U Arena.

In June 2012, the FFR announced that plans were under way for a new rugby-dedicated stadium to be constructed in Évry, 25 kilometres (16 mi) south of Paris. The stadium was projected to cost €600M and have a seating capacity of 82,000. It was originally scheduled for completion by 2017, but later delayed to 2021 or 2022. In December 2016, FFR officially abandoned the stadium project.

=== World Cup venues ===
During the 1991 World Cup, Pool D (which included France) matches were played throughout France including Béziers, Bayonne, Grenoble, Toulouse, Brive and Agen. Parc des Princes and Stadium Lille Métropole also hosted a quarter-final each. Pool C fixtures at the 1999 World Cup were played throughout France in Béziers, Bordeaux and Toulouse. A second round match was held at Stade Félix Bollaert, and one quarter final was held at the Stade de France, both 2007 venues.

For the 2007 World Cup, France was the primary host, and there were ten venues used for matches throughout the country (Cardiff in Wales and Edinburgh in Scotland also hosted some games). The French cities that hosted matches were Bordeaux (Stade Chaban-Delmas), Lens (Stade Félix Bollaert), Lyon (Stade Gerland), Marseille (Stade Vélodrome), Montpellier (Stade de la Mosson), Nantes (Stade de la Beaujoire), Paris (Stade de France, Saint-Denis and Parc des Princes), Saint-Étienne (Stade Geoffroy-Guichard), and Toulouse (Stadium de Toulouse). The final between England and South Africa was played at Stade de France.

France was again chosen to host in 2023. After a first choice of twelve venues, nine cities and stadiums were eventually selected for the tournament including five that were already used for the 2007 edition: biggest France stadium Stade de France (Saint-Denis – Paris), Stade Vélodrome (Marseille), OL Stadium (Décines-Charpieu – Lyon), Stade Pierre-Mauroy (Villeneuve-d'Ascq – Lille), Stade de Bordeaux, Stade Geoffroy-Guichard (Saint-Étienne) as well as Stade de Nice, Stade de la Beaujoire (Nantes) and Stadium de Toulouse. France played matches at Stade de France, Stade Pierre-Mauroy, Stade Vélodrome and OL Stadium. Their opening match against New Zealand was held at Stade de France like both semi-finals and finals.

== Competitive record ==
=== Six Nations ===
France competes annually in the Six Nations Championship, which is played against five other European nations: England, Ireland, Italy, Scotland and Wales. France first contested the tournament in 1910 when the Home Nations became the Five Nations. France were expelled from the tournament due to rumours of professionalism in the then-amateur sport in 1932, but rejoined in 1947. They first won the competition in 1954, sharing the championship with both England and Wales. France shared with Wales again the following season, and won it outright for the first time in 1959. France's longest wait for a championship spanned 37 tournaments (1910–1954). The Giuseppe Garibaldi Trophy is also contested between France and Italy during the Six Nations. Over the whole history of the Tournament, they are the third most-winning nation, ten wins behind England. However, it should be taken into account that France have been present in 34 fewer tournaments than the Home Nations. France has won almost exactly the same proportion of Six Nations Tournaments in which it has competed in as England, and is the most successful nation in the post-World War II era (1945–present).

	England	France	Ireland	Italy	Scotland	Wales
Tournaments	130	97	132	27	132	132
Outright wins (shared wins)
Home Nations	5 (4)	—N/a	4 (3)	—N/a	9 (2)	7 (3)
Five Nations	17 (6)	12 (8)	6 (5)	—N/a	5 (6)	15 (8)
Six Nations	7	8	6	0	0	6
Overall	29 (10)	20 (8)	16 (8)	0 (0)	14 (8)	28 (11)
Grand Slams
Home Nations	—N/a	—N/a	—N/a	—N/a	—N/a	2
Five Nations	11	6	1	—N/a	3	6
Six Nations	2	4	3	0	0	4
Overall	13	10	4	0	3	12
Triple Crowns
Home Nations	5	—N/a	2	—N/a	7	6
Five Nations	16	—N/a	4	—N/a	3	11
Six Nations	5	—N/a	9	—N/a	0	5
Overall	26	—N/a	15	—N/a	10	22
Wooden Spoons
Home Nations	7	—N/a	10	—N/a	5	6
Five Nations	10	12	15	—N/a	15	10
Six Nations	0	1	0	18	4	4
Overall	17	13	25	18	24	20

=== Rugby World Cup ===
The French have competed at every World Cup since the inaugural tournament in 1987. Although they have yet to win a World Cup, they have participated in the play-off stage of every tournament, and have reached the final three times.

In 1987, France took on pre-tournament favourites Australia at Concord Oval for a place in the final. In one of the greatest World Cup matches, the Australians appeared to be in control, leading 9–0, 15–12 and 24–21 at various stages of the match, only for the French to keep coming back. With the scores locked at 24–24 and the prospect of extra time looming, the French scored one of the most memorable tries in rugby history. Starting an attack from inside their own half, the French passed the ball through to 11 players before fullback Serge Blanco beat Wallabies hooker Tom Lawton to score a try in the corner. France won (30–24), and would face co-hosts New Zealand in the final at Eden Park. The French had not fully recovered from their magnificent effort in the semi-final, and New Zealand won the anticlimactic decider (29–9).

In 1991, France met eternal arch-rivals England in the quarterfinal at Parc des Princes. Earlier in the year at Twickenham the two sides had played each other for the Five Nations Grand Slam. The French scored three magnificent tries but were denied by the fearsome English forward pack. In a very tense and brutal physical match, the scores were tied at 10 all when the French were awarded a scrum five metres out from the tryline. French number eight Marc Cecillon looked set to score the try that would have won the game for the French. Suddenly he was hit and driven back in a tackle from opponent Mick Skinner, a tackle which changed the momentum of the match. England went on to win (19–10) and eventually reached the Final. At the end of the match, France coach Daniel Dubroca angrily assaulted New Zealand referee Dave Bishop in the players tunnel. He resigned soon afterwards.

In 1995, France finished third overall, defeating England (19–9) in the third-place play-off after their defeat to South Africa in the semi-final. After coming from behind to defeat the All Blacks in their 1999 semi-final, France lost to Australia (12–35) in the final. In 2003, France lost in the quarter-final to England (7–24). They finished in fourth place after losing the third/fourth place play-off match to the All Blacks. At the 2007 Rugby World Cup, after defeating New Zealand (20–18) in the quarter-final, France lost to England in the semi-final (9–14). France also lost to Argentina in the bronze medal final to finish the tournament in fourth place.

France's 2011 campaign was marked by turmoil within the camp; reports before the tournament indicated as many as 25 of the 30 squad members had turned against head coach Marc Lièvremont. In pool play, France had unimpressive wins over Japan and Canada, an expected loss to New Zealand, and a shock loss to Tonga. During this stage, Lièvremont heavily criticized the team in the media, further angering many of his players, with veteran back-rower Imanol Harinordoquy becoming publicly critical of Lièvremont. Despite the losses, they qualified for the knockout stage. At this time, the players effectively rebelled against Lièvremont; after the tournament, Harinordoquy would tell the French rugby publication Midi Olympique, "We had to free ourselves from his supervision." The team responded by defeating England (19–12) in the quarter-final and controversially beating Wales (9–8) in the semi-final after Welsh captain Sam Warburton was sent off. The French proved admirable opponents in the final, however, they lost to New Zealand (7–8) to finish runners-up for the third time in a Rugby World Cup.

In 2015, France finished second in their pool by beating Italy, Romania and Canada but losing to Ireland in their last pool match. France made it to the knock-out stage but suffered a heavy (13–62) defeat to the eventual champions New Zealand in the quarter-final. In 2019, they finished second in their pool by defeating Argentina, United States, and Canada. Their last match in Pool C against England was cancelled due to the effects of Typhoon Hagibis. They made it to the knock-out stage but lost to Wales (19–20) in the quarter-final. In 2023, France hosted the Rugby World Cup. They finished atop of their pool after beating New Zealand, Uruguay, Namibia and Italy. France made it to the knock-out stage but were defeated by the eventual champions South Africa (28–29) in the quarter-final. This was France's third straight loss in the quarter-final stage and the second time they have failed to win a Rugby World Cup on home soil.

France are the third-highest World Cup points scorers of all time, with 1,823 points. They are also the third-highest try scorers, and the second-highest penalty scorers. France's Thierry Lacroix was the top points scorer at the 1995 tournament with 112 points, and Jean-Baptiste Lafond was the joint top try scorer in 1991 with six tries (equal with David Campese). Vincent Clerc was the joint top try scorer in 2011 with six tries (equal with Chris Ashton), tied most with Jean-Baptiste Lafond, as he did the same 20 years earlier.

Rugby World Cup record
Year	Round	Pld	W	D	L	PF	PA	Squad
(New Zealand) (Australia) 1987	Runners-up	6	4	1	1	215	113	Squad
(England) (France) (Ireland) (Scotland) (Wales) 1991	Quarter-finals	4	3	0	1	92	44	Squad
(South Africa) 1995	Third place	6	5	0	1	184	87	Squad
(Wales) 1999	Runners-up	6	5	0	1	210	144	Squad
(Australia) 2003	Fourth place	7	5	0	2	267	155	Squad
(France) 2007	Fourth place	7	4	0	3	227	103	Squad
(New Zealand) 2011	Runners-up	7	4	0	3	159	124	Squad
(England) 2015	Quarter-finals	5	3	0	2	133	125	Squad
(Japan) 2019	Quarter-finals	5	3	1	1	98	71	Squad
(France) 2023	Quarter-finals	5	4	0	1	238	61	Squad
(Australia) 2027	Qualified							
(United States) 2031	To be determined							
Total	—	58	40	2	16	1823	1027	—
Champions; Runners–up; Third place; Fourth place; Home venue

During Typhoon Hagibis; England v France was to be cancelled and recorded as 0–0 draw

=== Overall and rankings ===
Men's World Rugby Rankings Top 20 as of 16 November 2026
Rank	Change (Note: Change from the previous week)	Team	Points
1	Steady	South Africa	91.53
2	Steady	New Zealand	90.65
3	▲1	France	89.05
4	▼1	Ireland	88.70
5	Steady	England	86.99
6	Steady	Scotland	85.28
7	Steady	Australia	82.24
8	Steady	Argentina	82.09
9	▲1	Wales	79.37
10	▼1	Fiji	77.79
11	Steady	Italy	75.84
12	Steady	Japan	75.25
13	Steady	Georgia	74.23
14	▲1	United States	68.39
15	▼1	Portugal	68.24
16	▲3	Samoa	67.60
17	▲1	Chile	67.00
18	▼2	Spain	66.53
19	▼2	Tonga	65.58
20	Steady	Uruguay	65.17

France's historical rankings

Source: World Rugby
Graph updated to 16 November 2026

In 2002, France were named the World Rugby Team of the Year. When the World Rankings were introduced by World Rugby (then the International Rugby Board) in 2003, France were ranked fifth. During November 2003 France briefly occupied third place before falling to fourth by December of that year. After falling to fifth during November 2004, France rose again to fourth by April 2005. During early 2006, France rose again, peaking at second in July of that year. France were ranked number two in the world but fell to third in June 2007 after two consecutive defeats to the All Blacks. They then fell to fifth after losing to Argentina in the opening match of the 2007 Rugby World Cup. In 2018, France fell to tenth in the World Rankings, making it their worst position on the rankings since the start of it in 2003. For the first time ever, France became World Number One in July 2022. As of 2025, France currently sit fifth in the World Rankings.

France have won 467 of their 840 test matches. Below is a table of the representative rugby matches played by France at test level.

Updated to: 15 March 2026

Opponent	Played	Won	Lost	Drawn	Win%	For	Aga	Diff
Argentina	56	40	15	1	71%	1,385	907	+478
Australia	53	22	29	2	42%	1,023	1,177	−154
British & Irish Lions	1	0	1	0	0%	27	29	−2
British Army	2	1	1	0	50%	24	45	−21
British Empire Forces	1	0	1	0	0%	6	27	−21
British Empire Services	1	1	0	0	100%	10	0	+10
Canada	9	8	1	0	89%	315	119	+196
Czech Republic	2	2	0	0	100%	47	9	+38
England	113	45	61	7	40%	1,563	1,867	−304
Fiji	12	11	1	0	92%	441	170	+271
Georgia	2	2	0	0	100%	105	22	+83
Germany	15	13	2	0	87%	298	89	+209
Ireland	105	61	37	7	58%	1,757	1,352	+405
Ireland XV	3	2	1	0	67%	34	29	+5
Italy	52	48	3	1	92%	1,658	613	+1,045
Ivory Coast	1	1	0	0	100%	54	18	+36
Japan	8	7	0	1	88%	300	158	+142
Kiwis	1	0	1	0	0%	9	14	−5
Namibia	3	3	0	0	100%	230	23	+207
New Zealand	67	15	51	1	22%	961	1,781	−820
New Zealand Māori	1	0	1	0	0%	3	12	−9
Pacific Islanders	1	1	0	0	100%	42	17	+25
Romania	50	40	8	2	80%	1,315	462	+853
Samoa	4	4	0	0	100%	156	49	+107
Scotland	105	61	41	3	58%	1,677	1,422	+255
South Africa	47	12	29	6	26%	737	1026	−289
Tonga	6	4	2	0	67%	172	96	+76
United States	8	7	1	0	88%	214	102	+112
Uruguay	2	2	0	0	100%	70	40	+30
Wales	106	52	51	3	49%	1,716	1,634	+82
Wales XV	2	1	1	0	50%	12	8	+4
Zimbabwe	1	1	0	0	100%	70	12	+58
Total	840	467	339	34	55.6%	16,431	13,329	+3,102

== Coaching staff ==
=== Coaching and management history ===
As of match played vs Scotland on 7 March 2026

Only official competitive and test matches are counted.
Includes a cancelled 2019 World Cup match against England awarded as a 0–0 draw and a cancelled Autumn Nations Cup fixture against Fiji awarded as a 28–0 win.

Picture	Head coach	Tenure	Tests	Won	Drew	Lost	Win %	Honours
	(France) Jean Prat	1963–1967	33	21	4	8	63.64	(gold) 1967 Five Nations Championship
	(France) Fernand Cazenave	1968–1973	34	11	5	18	32.35	(gold) 1968 Five Nations Championship – Grand Slam; (gold) 1970 Five Nations Championship – Shared win
—	(France) Jean Desclaux	1973–1981	60	35	4	21	58.33	(gold) 1973 Five Nations Championship – Shared win (gold) 1977 Five Nations Championship – Grand Slam
	(France) Jacques Fouroux	1981–1990	82	49	4	29	59.76	(gold) 1981 Five Nations Championship – Grand Slam; (gold) 1983 Five Nations Championship – Shared win (gold) 1986 Five Nations Championship – Shared win (gold) 1987 Five Nations Championship – Grand Slam; (gold) 1988 Five Nations Championship – Shared win (gold) 1989 Five Nations Championship; (silver) 1987 Rugby World Cup
	(France) Daniel Dubroca	1990–1991	17	11	0	6	64.71	—
—	(France) Pierre Berbizier	1991–1995	39	26	1	12	66.67	(gold) 1993 Five Nations Championship; (bronze) 1995 Rugby World Cup
	(France) Jean-Claude Skrela	1995–1999	52	34	0	18	65.38	(gold) 1997 Five Nations Championship – Grand Slam; (gold) 1998 Five Nations Championship – Grand Slam; (silver) 1999 Rugby World Cup
	(France) Bernard Laporte	1999–2007	98	62	2	34	63.27	(gold) 2002 Six Nations Championship – Grand Slam; (gold) 2004 Six Nations Championship – Grand Slam; (gold) 2006 Six Nations Championship; (gold) 2007 Six Nations Championship
	(France) Marc Lièvremont	2007–2011	45	27	0	18	60.00	(gold) 2010 Six Nations Championship – Grand Slam; (silver) 2011 Rugby World Cup
—	(France) Philippe Saint-André	2011–2015	45	20	2	23	44.44	—
	(France) Guy Novès	2015–2017	21	7	1	13	33.33	—
	(France) Jacques Brunel	2017–2019	24	10	1	13	41.67	—
	(France) Fabien Galthié	2019–	69	51	1	17	73.91	(gold) 2022 Six Nations Championship – Grand Slam; (gold) 2025 Six Nations Championship; (gold) 2026 Six Nations Championship

Historically the role of France rugby union head coach has varied considerably. Due to the status of rugby union as an amateur sport for most of its history, the job of deciding tactics and running team trainings has often been that of the captain or senior players. Therefore, a comprehensive list of national coaches is impossible. The very first entitled head coach is former legend Jean Prat who won the 1967 Five Nations Championship as a manager before leaving the team before the summer tour of South Africa a few weeks later. Next year, France then won the Grand Slam in the 1968 edition without having a head coach, in self-management. Later that year, Fernand Cazenave took his duties. Two years after, he shared the 1970 Five Nations Championship win with Wales.

Although coached by Jean Desclaux between 1973 and 1980, the French team's main influence during the late 1970 was captain Jacques Fouroux. Fouroux played scrum-half and captained France to their 1977 Five Nations Grand Slam, during which France played a very forward-oriented style of rugby. Although the style of Fouroux's Gang was successful, it was criticised because it contrasted with the traditional open attacking style of French rugby. Fouroux was given the nickname "the little Corporal" – the same as Napoleon Bonaparte. Fouroux was named as Desclaux's successor in 1981 at the age of just 33. He continued to promote a forward-oriented style of play, and France won six Five Nations titles – including two Grand Slams – while he was coach. After nearly ten years in the role he resigned in 1990 after a defeat to Romania.

Fouroux was succeeded by Daniel Dubroca, who coached the team to the 1991 Rugby World Cup. Dubroca's tenure as coach did not last long, however, as he resigned after violently confronting referee Dave Bishop following France's World Cup quarter-final against England. Dubroca was replaced by Pierre Berbizier, who coached the team until after the 1995 Rugby World Cup. Berbizier's replacement, Jean-Claude Skrela, coached France to Five Nations Grand Slams in 1997 and 1998 before they came last in the tournament in 1999. He officially resigned following France's loss to Australia in the 1999 Rugby World Cup final. Bernard Laporte was appointed as Skrela's successor in November. Laporte guided France through the 2003 and 2007 Rugby World Cups before stepping down to become Secretary of State for Sport. After Philippe Saint-André turned down the offer to replace Laporte, French Rugby Federation president Bernard Lapasset appointed Marc Lièvremont to guide France to the 2011 World Cup. Lièvremont's tenure as coach was marked by inconsistent and puzzling squad selection choices, and player discontent. There were some bright moments, notably wins against New Zealand in Dunedin and South Africa in Toulouse, and the 2010 Six Nations Grand Slam. But there was also a (16–59) loss to Australia in Paris, a (21–22) loss to Italy in the 2011 Six Nations, and a (14–19) loss to Tonga during the 2011 World Cup. In August 2011, before the World Cup, it was announced that Philippe Saint-André would replace Lièvremont and guide France to the 2015 World Cup. This came as no surprise to Lièvremont, as he had announced as early as May 2010 that he would not continue as the coach of France after the World Cup.

France did not impress under Saint-André, finishing no higher than fourth in the Six Nations during his tenure and even claiming the wooden spoon in 2013. Following the 2015 Six Nations, he announced his resignation effective after that year's World Cup and was replaced by Guy Novès. France was even less impressive under Novès, with Les Bleus winning fewer than one-third of their matches during his tenure, capped off by a run of seven winless matches. Novès was dismissed in December 2017, becoming the first France head coach ever to be fired before the end of his contract, and was replaced by former Italy head coach Jacques Brunel, who arrived from the same position with Bordeaux Bègles. Novès' assistants were dismissed as well.

In April 2019, then-French Rugby Federation president Bernard Laporte announced that Fabien Galthié would be appointed as head coach of the team after the 2019 World Cup. A week later, Jacques Brunel also confirmed that Galthié joined the France management crew as an assistant to prepare the team for the 2019 World Cup. After the World Cup, the federation formalizes the new coaching staff structured around Fabien Galthié. Raphaël Ibañez was appointed general manager of the team along with four staff membres: William Servat and Karim Ghezal as forwards coaches; Laurent Labit as backs coach and Englishman Shaun Edwards, responsible for the defense. Thibault Giroud, former Toulon head of physical training where he worked with Galthié, was also appointed as head of high performance. Video analyst Nicolas Buffa retained his positions and became the analysis unit director.

After the 2023 Rugby World Cup, Ghezal, Labit and Giroud left the France coaching staff and were replaced respectively by Stade Français Paris forwards coach Laurent Sempéré, former international centre Patrick Arlettaz and Nicolas Jeanjean, who became the head of high performance.

=== Current staff ===
Position	Name
General manager	(France) Raphaël Ibañez
Head coach	(France) Fabien Galthié
Forwards and set piece coaches	(France) Laurent Sempéré (line-out)
Forwards and set piece coaches	(France) William Servat (scrum)
Backs and attack coach	(France) Patrick Arlettaz
Defence coach	(France) Geoffrey Doumayrou
Head of high performance	(France) Nicolas Jeanjean
Head of video analysis	(France) Nicolas Buffa
Kicking coach	(South Africa) Vlok Cilliers
Discipline and refereeing advisor	(France) Jérôme Garcès

== Players ==
=== Current squad ===
On 21 October, France named a 42-player squad ahead of the 2026 Nations Championship Northern Hemisphere Series.

On 25 October, Karl Sorin withdrew from the squad due to injury. He was replaced by Thomas Laclayat.

On 26 October, Fabien Brau-Boirie, Marko Gazzotti and Antoine Hastoy withdrew from the squad due to injury. They were replaced by Nicolas Depoortère, Anthony Jelonch and Louis Le Brun respectively.

Head coach: (France) Fabien Galthié

- Caps updated: 13 November 2026 (after France v South Africa)

Player	Position	Date of birth (age)	Caps	Club/province
Guillaume Cramont	Hooker	29 December 2000 (age 25)	1	(France) Bayonne
Maxime Lamothe	Hooker	3 October 1998 (age 28)	8	(France) Bordeaux Bègles
Peato Mauvaka	Hooker	10 January 1997 (age 29)	50	(France) Toulouse
Sipili Falatea	Prop	6 June 1997 (age 29)	17	(France) Bordeaux Bègles
Jean-Baptiste Gros	Prop	29 May 1999 (age 27)	47	(France) Toulon
Thomas Laclayat	Prop	2 October 1997 (age 29)	3	(France) Pau
Régis Montagne	Prop	30 September 2000 (age 26)	11	(France) Clermont
Rodrigue Neti	Prop	28 April 1995 (age 31)	10	(France) Toulouse
Jefferson Poirot	Prop	1 November 1992 (age 34)	40	(France) Bordeaux Bègles
Tevita Tatafu	Prop	13 October 2002 (age 24)	3	(France) Bayonne
Reda Wardi	Prop	2 August 1995 (age 31)	18	(France) La Rochelle
Hugo Auradou	Lock	20 July 2003 (age 23)	14	(France) Pau
Joshua Brennan	Lock	28 November 2001 (age 24)	3	(France) Toulouse
Tyler Duguid	Lock	17 October 2000 (age 26)	1	(France) Montpellier
Mickaël Guillard	Lock	10 December 2000 (age 25)	21	(France) Lyon
Tom Staniforth	Lock	13 August 1994 (age 32)	5	(France) Castres
Florian Verhaeghe	Lock	27 April 1997 (age 29)	7	(France) Montpellier
Cameron Woki	Lock	7 November 1998 (age 28)	34	(France) Bordeaux Bègles
Grégory Alldritt	Back row	23 March 1997 (age 29)	59	(France) La Rochelle
Paul Boudehent	Back row	21 November 1999 (age 27)	22	(France) La Rochelle
Esteban Capilla	Back row	5 January 2003 (age 23)	2	(France) Bayonne
François Cros	Back row	25 March 1994 (age 32)	46	(France) Toulouse
Alexandre Fischer	Back row	19 January 1998 (age 28)	3	(France) Bayonne
Oscar Jégou	Back row	31 May 2003 (age 23)	15	(France) La Rochelle
Anthony Jelonch	Back row	28 July 1996 (age 30)	39	(France) Toulouse
Charles Ollivon	Back row	11 May 1993 (age 33)	55	(France) Toulon
Antoine Dupont (c)	Scrum-half	15 November 1996 (age 30)	66	(France) Toulouse
Nolann Le Garrec	Scrum-half	14 May 2002 (age 24)	16	(France) La Rochelle
Maxime Lucu	Scrum-half	12 January 1993 (age 33)	35	(France) Bordeaux Bègles
Axel Desperes	Fly-half	16 January 2004 (age 22)	0	(France) Pau
Louis Le Brun	Fly-half	28 February 2002 (age 24)	0	(France) Castres
Romain Ntamack	Fly-half	1 May 1999 (age 27)	46	(France) Toulouse
Nicolas Depoortère	Centre	13 January 2003 (age 23)	9	(France) Bordeaux Bègles
Émilien Gailleton	Centre	13 July 2003 (age 23)	15	(France) Pau
Kalvin Gourgues	Centre	27 March 2005 (age 21)	6	(France) Toulouse
Yoram Moefana	Centre	18 July 2000 (age 26)	44	(France) Bordeaux Bègles
Tani Vili	Centre	31 October 2000 (age 26)	0	(France) Stade Français Paris
Jeremy Ward	Centre	10 January 1996 (age 30)	0	(France) Stade Français Paris
Théo Attissogbe	Wing	19 November 2004 (age 22)	18	(France) Pau
Louis Bielle-Biarrey	Wing	16 June 2003 (age 23)	29	(France) Bordeaux Bègles
Mathis Ferté	Wing	4 February 2004 (age 22)	0	(France) Toulon
Théo Forner	Wing	17 October 2001 (age 25)	0	(France) Perpignan
Aaron Grandidier-Nkanang	Wing	18 May 2000 (age 26)	4	(France) Pau
Damian Penaud	Wing	25 September 1996 (age 30)	50	(France) Bordeaux Bègles
Léo Barré	Fullback	20 August 2002 (age 24)	9	(France) Stade Français Paris

=== Selection policy ===
In December 2016, when World Rugby was considering a change in the eligibility rules for international selection, FFR president Bernard Laporte announced that the body would require that all France national team members hold French passports. This requirement is in addition to then-current WR rules mandating three years' residency for international selection, a period which WR increased to five years effective from 31 December 2020. Players who represented France prior to Laporte's announcement remained eligible for selection even if they did not hold French passports. Thus, since 2016 France have had the lowest number of foreign-born players in their Six Nations's squads.

=== Notable players ===
Eleven former players who have represented France on the international stage have been inducted into the World Rugby Hall of Fame. Its direct predecessor is the IRB Hall of Fame, founded in 2006 by the sport's international governing body, World Rugby, when it was known as the International Rugby Board. In late 2014, the IRB Hall merged with the separate International Rugby Hall of Fame, with all International Hall inductees becoming members of the World Rugby Hall of Fame.

Marcel Communeau (1885–1971), a back-rower for Stade Français Paris at club level, played in France's first official international match against New Zealand's Original All Blacks in 1906. He went on to earn 21 caps for France, serving as captain for the country's first Five Nations appearance in 1910 and leading France to its first-ever win in that competition in 1911 against Scotland. Communeau is also credited with suggesting that France adopt the rooster as its team emblem. He entered the World Rugby Hall in 2015.

Jean Prat (1923–2005) earned 51 caps playing for France from 1945 to 1955, and captained France to their first wins over Wales and the All Blacks. He was also France's captain in 1954 when they won their first ever Five Nations (shared with Wales and England). Prat was inducted to the International Hall of Fame in 2001 and the IRB Hall of Fame in 2011.

Lucien Mias (1930–2024), nicknamed Docteur Pack, was credited with inventing the concept of the advantage line in forward play. When inducted into the IRB Hall of Fame in 2011, he was called "one of the most influential captains of his country". He was most noted for captaining France to a Test series win over South Africa in 1958, the first such feat in the 20th century for a touring team.

André Boniface (1934–2024) also played in France's win over the All Blacks in 1954; it was only his second test for France. Boniface went on to play 48 tests for France before retiring in 1966. He was inducted to the International Hall in 2005 and the IRB Hall in 2011.

Guy Boniface (1937–1968) emerged on the international scene shortly after his older brother André, although the two did not play together in the same France side until 1961. According to the IRB, the Boniface brothers "redefined the concept of back play through their unique blend of skill and creativity." Guy won 35 caps for France before his death in an auto accident in 1968. He was inducted into the IRB Hall of Fame alongside his brother in 2011.

Jo Maso (born 1944) first played for France between 1966 and 1973; mainly at centre. He played in France's first ever Five Nations Grand Slam in 1968, and that year toured New Zealand and Australia. He represented France in 25 tests and also played for the Barbarians and the World XV that beat England in 1971. Maso entered the International Hall in 2003 and became a member of the World Rugby Hall with the merger of the two halls of fame. He is now the manager of the France national team.

Jean-Pierre Rives (born 1952), a 1997 inductee of the International Hall who entered the World Rugby Hall with the merger, played 59 tests for France between 1975 and 1984; including 34 as captain. He played in Five Nations Grand Slams in 1977 and 1981, and captained France to their first ever win over the All Blacks in New Zealand. Rives is now a sculptor, and designed the Giuseppe Garibaldi Trophy (Italian: Trofeo Garibaldi; French: Trophée Garibaldi), which is competed for every year by France and Italy in the 6 Nations championship.

Serge Blanco (born 1958) played in 93 tests for France between 1980 and 1991. Playing at fullback Blanco won Five Nations Grand Slams with France in 1981 and 1987, and scored the match-winning try in France's semi-final against Australia in the 1987 World Cup. He is past president both of his longtime club, Biarritz Olympique, and France's national professional league, Ligue Nationale de Rugby. Blanco was inducted to the International Hall in 1997 and the IRB Hall in 2011.

Centre Philippe Sella (born 1962), who was also in the 1987 team, played 111 times for France between 1982 and 1995, setting an appearances record that stood until Fabien Pelous, who himself would be indicted into the World Rugby Hall in 2017, broke it during the 2007 Rugby World Cup. In 1986, he achieved the rare feat of scoring a try in each of France's Five Nations matches. Sella entered the International Hall in 1999 and the IRB Hall in 2005.

Lock Fabien Pelous (born 1973) was inducted into the World Rugby Hall in 2017 at a ceremony at the Hall's physical location in Rugby. He appeared 118 times for France from 1995 to 2007, surpassing Sella as France's most-capped player. According to World Rugby, "Pelous' spirit and robustness in the heat of battle made him perfect captaincy material", and he would captain Les Bleus 42 times, with only Thierry Dusautoir serving as captain on more occasions. In his 18-season club career, 12 of which were with his hometown club Toulouse, he helped Toulouse to two European and three French titles.

Flanker Thierry Dusautoir (born 1981) was inducted into the Hall of Fame in 2023 at the World Rugby Awards ceremony in Paris. Appearing 80 times for France, 56 as captain, from 2006 to 2015, he played in three World Cups. Two of his greatest personal accolades came in World Cup matches against New Zealand—he was Player of the Match in France's losing effort in the 2011 World Cup final, and set a World Cup record of 38 tackles in France's win in the 2007 World Cup quarterfinals. At club level, he played on teams that won five French titles and one European Cup.

=== Award winners ===
==== World Rugby Awards ====
The following France players have been recognised at the World Rugby Awards since 2001:

World Rugby Player of the Year
Year	Nominees	Winners
2002	Fabien Galthié	Fabien Galthié
2003	Imanol Harinordoquy	—
2004	Serge Betsen	—
2007	Yannick Jauzion	—
2010	Imanol Harinordoquy (2)	—
2011	Thierry Dusautoir	Thierry Dusautoir
2012	Frédéric Michalak	—
2021	Antoine Dupont	Antoine Dupont
2022	Antoine Dupont (2)	—
2023	Antoine Dupont (3)	—
2025	Louis Bielle-Biarrey	—

World Rugby Breakthrough Player of the Year
Year	Nominees	Winners
2017	Damian Penaud	—
2019	Romain Ntamack	Romain Ntamack
2023	Louis Bielle-Biarrey	—

World Rugby Dream Team of the Year
Year	No.	Players
2021	9.	Antoine Dupont
2022	8.	Grégory Alldritt
2022	9.	Antoine Dupont (2)
2023	1.	Cyril Baille
2023	7.	Charles Ollivon
2023	9.	Antoine Dupont (3)
2023	14.	Damian Penaud
2023	15.	Thomas Ramos
2025	11.	Louis Bielle-Biarrey

World Rugby Try of the Year
Year	Date	Scorer	Match	Tournament	Ref
2021	26 March	Damian Penaud	vs. Scotland	Six Nations	
2024	17 March	Nolann Le Garrec	vs. England	Six Nations	

==== Six Nations Player of the Championship ====
The following France players have been shortlisted for the Six Nations Player of the Championship since 2004:

Six Nations Player of the Year (2004–09)
Year	Nominees	Winners
2004	Serge Betsen	—
2004	Yannick Jauzion	—
2004	Sylvain Marconnet	—
2004	Frédéric Michalak	—
2005	Serge Betsen (2)	—
2005	Yannick Nyanga	—
2005	Fabien Pelous	—
2005	Dimitri Yachvili	—
2006	Thomas Castaignède	—
2006	Christophe Dominici	—
2006	Florian Fritz	—
2006	Raphaël Ibañez	—
2007	Christophe Dominici (2)	—
2007	Raphaël Ibañez (2)	—
2007	Yannick Jauzion (2)	—
2008	Vincent Clerc	—

Six Nations Player of the Year (2010–16)
Year	Nominees	Winners
2010	Mathieu Bastareaud	—
2010	Thierry Dusautoir	—
2010	Imanol Harinordoquy	—
2010	Morgan Parra	—
2011	Thierry Dusautoir (2)	—
2011	Maxime Médard	—
2012	Imanol Harinordoquy (2)	—
2012	Yoann Maestri	—
2012	Julien Malzieu	—
2013	Mathieu Bastareaud (2)	—
2013	Nicolas Mas	—
2013	Louis Picamoles	—
2014	Brice Dulin	—
2014	Yoann Huget	—
2016	Guilhem Guirado	—
2016	Virimi Vakatawa	—

Six Nations Player of the Year (2017–25)
Year	Nominees	Winners
2017	Camille Lopez	—
2017	Louis Picamoles (2)	—
2018	Guilhem Guirado (2)	—
2020	Grégory Alldritt	Antoine Dupont
2020	Antoine Dupont	Antoine Dupont
2020	Romain Ntamack	Antoine Dupont
2021	Antoine Dupont (2)	—
2022	Grégory Alldritt (2)	Antoine Dupont (2)
2022	Antoine Dupont (3)	Antoine Dupont (2)
2023	Antoine Dupont (4)	Antoine Dupont (3)
2023	Damian Penaud	Antoine Dupont (3)
2023	Thomas Ramos	Antoine Dupont (3)
2025	Louis Bielle-Biarrey	Louis Bielle-Biarrey

Six Nations Team of the Championship
Year	1st XV				2nd XV			
Year	Forwards		Backs		Forwards		Backs	
Year	No.	Players	No.	Players	No.	Players	No.	Players
2021	—		9.	Antoine Dupont	Not awarded			
2022	1.	Cyril Baille	9.	Antoine Dupont (2)	Not awarded			
2022	1.	Cyril Baille	10.	Romain Ntamack	Not awarded			
2022	2.	Julien Marchand	11.	Gabin Villière	Not awarded			
2022	5.	Paul Willemse	12.	Jonathan Danty	Not awarded			
2022	6.	François Cros	13.	Gaël Fickou	Not awarded			
2022	8.	Grégory Alldritt	14.	Damian Penaud	Not awarded			
2023	4.	Thibaud Flament	9.	Antoine Dupont (3)	2.	Julien Marchand	15.	Thomas Ramos
2023	4.	Thibaud Flament	9.	Antoine Dupont (3)	5.	Paul Willemse	15.	Thomas Ramos
2023	4.	Thibaud Flament	14.	Damian Penaud (2)	7.	Charles Ollivon	15.	Thomas Ramos
2023	4.	Thibaud Flament	14.	Damian Penaud (2)	8.	Grégory Alldritt	15.	Thomas Ramos
2024	3.	Uini Atonio	15.	Thomas Ramos	Not awarded			
2025	5.	Mickaël Guillard	9.	Antoine Dupont (4)	Not awarded			
2025	8.	Grégory Alldritt (2)	11.	Louis Bielle-Biarrey	Not awarded			

Six Nations Try of the Championship
Year	Nominee	Match	Winner	Ref
2023	Damian Penaud (2nd try)	vs. England	—	
2023	Damian Penaud	vs. Ireland	—	
2023	Damian Penaud (1st try)	vs. Wales	—	
2024	Nolann Le Garrec	vs. England	—	
2025	Léo Barré (2nd try)	vs. Italy	Louis Bielle-Biarrey	
2025	Louis Bielle-Biarrey (2nd try)	vs. Ireland	Louis Bielle-Biarrey	

== Individual all-time records ==
The record for the most points scored for France is 563, which is held by Thomas Ramos, who surpassed the previous record holder, Frederic Michalak (436) on 15 March 2025. Ramos also holds the record for the most conversions with 135. The record holder for the most penalties scored is 89 by Thierry Lacroix, and the drop goal record of 15 is held by Jean-Patrick Lescarboura. The record for the most caps for France is held by Fabien Pelous with 118. The record for the most tries scored for France is 41, and is held by Damian Penaud.

== Honours ==
=== Worldwide ===
- Rugby World Cup
  - (silver) Runners-up (3): 1987, 1999, 2011
  - (bronze) Third place (1): 1995
- Latin Cup
  - (gold) Champions (2): 1995, 1997
- Autumn Nations Cup
  - (silver) Runners-up (1): 2020

=== Continental ===
- Five Nations/Six Nations Championship
  - (gold) Champions (20): 1959, 1961, 1962, 1967, 1968, 1977, 1981, 1987, 1989, 1993, 1997, 1998, 2002, 2004, 2006, 2007, 2010, 2022, 2025, 2026
  - (gold) Champions (shared; 8): 1954, 1955, 1960, 1970, 1973, 1983, 1986, 1988
  - (silver) Runners-up (15): 1951, 1971, 1976, 1978, 1979, 1984, 1985, 1991, 2000, 2005, 2011, 2020, 2021, 2023, 2024
  - (silver) Runners-up (shared; 12): 1921, 1930, 1931, 1948, 1949, 1956, 1963, 1965, 1966, 1974, 1975, 1992
  - (bronze) Third place (9): 1958, 1990, 1994, 1995, 1996, 2003, 2008, 2009, 2017
  - (bronze) Third place (shared; 5): 1923, 1928, 1947, 1950, 1964

==== Slams ====
- Grand Slam (10): 1968, 1977, 1981, 1987, 1997, 1998, 2002, 2004, 2010, 2022
- Small Slam: 1960, 1961

=== Rivalry trophies ===
- Auld Alliance Trophy (5): 2019, 2022, 2023, 2024, 2025
- Dave Gallaher Trophy (3): 2009, 2021, 2024
- Giuseppe Garibaldi Trophy (17): 2007, 2008, 2009, 2010, 2012, 2014, 2015, 2016, 2017, 2018, 2019, 2020, 2021, 2022, 2023, 2025, 2026
- Solidarity Trophy (1): 2026
- Trophée des Bicentenaires (7): 2001, 2004, 2005, 2012, 2014, 2022, 2023

== See also ==
- Dave Gallaher Trophy – trophy for tests between France and New Zealand
- France national rugby sevens team – national rugby sevens team
- Le Crunch – traditional name for tests between France and England
- Trophée des Bicentenaires – trophy for tests between France and Australia

== Bibliography ==
- Dine, Philip (2001). French Rugby Football—Cultural History. Berg. ISBN 978-1859733271.
