= 1952 Five Nations Championship =

Rugby union competition

- Date: 12 January - 5 April 1952
- Countries: England; Ireland; France; Scotland; Wales

Tournament statistics
- Champions: Wales (12th title)
- Grand Slam: Wales (5th title)
- Triple Crown: Wales (9th title)
- Matches played: 10

The 1952 Five Nations Championship was the twenty-third series of the rugby union Five Nations Championship. Including the previous incarnations as the Home Nations and Five Nations, this was the fifty-eighth series of the northern hemisphere rugby union championship. Ten matches were played between 12 January and 5 April. It was contested by England, France, Ireland, Scotland and Wales. Wales won their 5th Grand Slam and a 9th Triple Crown.

== Participants ==
The teams involved were:

Nation	Venue	City	Captain
England	Twickenham	London	Nim Hall
France	Stade Olympique Yves-du-Manoir	Colombes	Guy Basquet
Ireland	Lansdowne Road	Dublin	Des O'Brien
Scotland	Murrayfield	Edinburgh	Peter Kininmonth/Arthur Dorward
Wales	National Stadium/St. Helens	Cardiff/Swansea	John Gwilliam

== Table ==
Pos	Team	Pld	W	D	L	PF	PA	PD	Pts
1	Wales	4	4	0	0	42	14	+28	8
2	England	4	3	0	1	34	14	+20	6
3	Ireland	4	2	0	2	26	33	−7	4
4	France	4	1	0	3	29	37	−8	2
5	Scotland	4	0	0	4	22	55	−33	0

== Results ==
1952-01-12

Scotland	11–13	France

Murrayfield, Edinburgh

1952-01-19

England	6–8	Wales

Twickenham, London

1952-01-26

France	8–11	Ireland

Stade Olympique Yves-du-Manoir, Colombes

1952-02-02

Wales	11–0	Scotland

Arms Park, Cardiff

1952-02-23

Ireland	12–8	Scotland

Lansdowne Road, Dublin

1952-03-08

Ireland	3–14	Wales

Lansdowne Road, Dublin

1952-03-15

Scotland	3–19	England

Murrayfield, Edinburgh

1952-03-22

Wales	9–5	France

St. Helen's Rugby and Cricket Ground, Swansea

1952-03-29

England	3–0	Ireland

Twickenham, London

1952-04-05

France	3–6	England

Stade Olympique Yves-du-Manoir, Colombes
