= List of international rugby rivalries =

In International rugby union history there have been a number of notable rivalries. This list reflects some of the great rivalries.

For the purpose of this article only, the criteria for inclusion are (all must be met):

- The two teams must have played each other at least 35 times.
- Both teams must at least be a tier-one or tier-two rugby nation.
- The two teams must have had their first match played in 1980 or earlier.

| Rivalry | Period | Meetings | Overall Head to Head | Most Wins | Name of Trophy | Ref |
|---|---|---|---|---|---|---|
| Australia–New Zealand | 1903– | 181 | 128–45 (8 draws) | New Zealand | Bledisloe Cup | |
| England–Scotland | 1871– | 144 | 77–48 (19 draws) | England | Calcutta Cup | |
| England–Ireland | 1875– | 144 | 81–55 (8 draws) | England | Millennium Trophy | |
| Ireland–Scotland | 1877– | 144 | 73–66 (5 draws) | Ireland | Centenary Quaich | |
| England–Wales | 1881– | 144 | 71–61 (12 draws) | England | —N/a | |
| Ireland–Wales | 1882– | 137 | 70–60 (7 draws) | Wales | —N/a | |
| Scotland–Wales | 1883– | 132 | 75–54 (3 draws) | Wales | Doddie Weir Cup | |
| England–France | 1906– | 113 | 61–45 (7 draws) | England | —N/a | |
| New Zealand–South Africa | 1921– | 111 | 64–43 (4 draws) | New Zealand | Freedom Cup | |
| France–Wales | 1908– | 105 | 52–51 (3 draws) | France | —N/a | |
| France–Ireland | 1909– | 105 | 61–37 (7 draws) | France | —N/a | |
| France–Scotland | 1910– | 105 | 61–41 (3 draws) | France | Auld Alliance Trophy | |
| Australia–South Africa | 1933– | 97 | 53–41 (3 draws) | South Africa | Mandela Challenge Plate | |
| Fiji–Tonga | 1924– | 96 | 66–27 (3 draws) | Fiji | —N/a | |
| Samoa–Tonga | 1926– | 71 | 39–28 (4 draws) | Samoa | —N/a | |
| Canada–United States | 1977– | 67 | 40–25 (2 draws) | Canada | —N/a | |
| France–New Zealand | 1906– | 67 | 52–15 (1 draw) | New Zealand | Dave Gallaher Trophy | |
| Chile–Uruguay | 1948– | 57 | 43–13 (1 draw) | Uruguay | —N/a | |
| Australia–England | 1909– | 57 | 29–27 (1 draw) | England | Ella–Mobbs Trophy | |
| Fiji–Samoa | 1924– | 57 | 33–21 (3 draws) | Fiji | —N/a | |
| Argentina–France | 1949– | 56 | 40–15 (1 draw) | France | —N/a | |
| Australia–France | 1928– | 53 | 29–23 (2 draws) | Australia | Trophée des Bicentenaires | |
| France–Romania | 1924–2015 | 51 | 41–8 (2 draws) | France | —N/a | |
| France–Italy | 1937– | 51 | 47–3 (1 draw) | France | —N/a | |
| Australia–Wales | 1908– | 49 | 34–14 (1 draw) | Australia | James Bevan Trophy | |
| England–New Zealand | 1905– | 47 | 36–9 (2 draws) | New Zealand | Hillary Shield | |
| England–South Africa | 1906– | 47 | 30–16 (2 draws) | South Africa | —N/a | |
| France–South Africa | 1913– | 47 | 29–12 (6 draws) | South Africa | —N/a | |
| Italy–Romania | 1936– | 44 | 25–16 (3 draws) | Italy | —N/a | |
| South Africa–Wales | 1906– | 44 | 37–7 (1 draw) | South Africa | —N/a | |
| Spain–Portugal | 1935– | 43 | 27–14 (2 draws) | Spain | —N/a | |
| Australia–Argentina | 1979– | 42 | 30–10 (3 draws) | Australia | Puma Trophy | |
| Ireland–New Zealand | 1905– | 39 | 34–5 (1 draw) | New Zealand | —N/a | |
| Australia–Ireland | 1927– | 39 | 22–17 (1 draw) | Australia | Lansdowne Cup | |
| Australia–Scotland | 1927– | 35 | 22–13 | Australia | Hopetoun Cup | |

== See also ==
- Rugby union trophies and awards
- List of rugby union competitions
