= Antoine Dupont =

France international rugby union player (born 1996)

Antoine Dupont CLH OLY
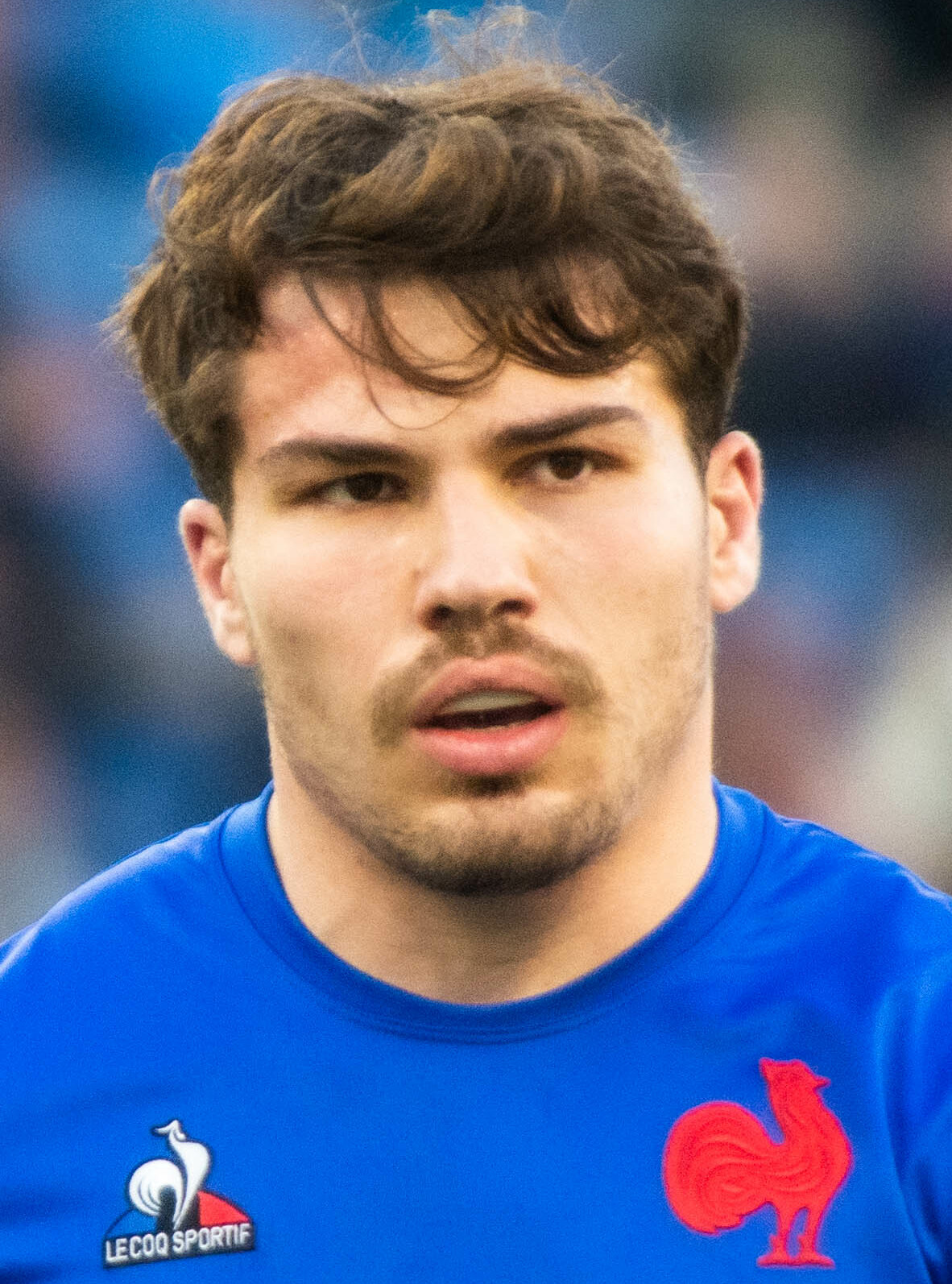
- Dupont representing France during the 2023 Six Nations Championship
- Full name: Antoine Gilbert Louis Dupont
- Born: 15 November 1996 (age 30) Lannemezan, France
- Height: 1.74 m (5 ft 9 in)
- Weight: 89 kg (196 lb)
- University: Paul Sabatier University

Rugby union career
- Position(s): Scrum-half, Fly-half
- Current team: Toulouse
Youth career
- 2000–2011: Magnoac
- 2011–2014: Auch
Senior career
Years	Team	Apps	(Points)
2014–2017	Castres	62	(47)
2017–	Toulouse	156	(370)
- Correct as of 24 October 2026
International career
Years	Team	Apps	(Points)
2016	France U20	11	(36)
2017–	France	65	(85)
- Correct as of 7 November 2026
National sevens team
Years	Team		Comps
2024	France		16 (40)
Medal record
Men's rugby sevens
Representing France
Olympic Games
Gold medal – first place	2024 Paris	Team competition

Antoine Gilbert Louis Dupont ([ɑ̃twan dypɔ̃]; born 15 November 1996) is a French professional rugby union player who plays as a scrum-half for Top 14 club Toulouse and captains the France national team.

Dupont has won 39 individual accolades in his career, including the World Rugby Men's 15s Player of the Year award in 2021 and the World Rugby Men's Sevens Player of the Year in 2024. He is the first French player to win the Men's Sevens World Rugby Player of the Year award. He is also the first and only rugby player ever to have won both the Men's 15s and the Men's Sevens World Rugby Player of the Year awards in one's career. He has also won a shared record of three Six Nations Player of the Championships, the most by a French player. Dupont is widely regarded as one of the best players of all time, and perhaps the greatest No. 9 to play in the modern era.

Dupont has won 13 major competitions in his career: six Top 14 titles, two European Rugby Champions Cup, three Six Nations Championship including one Six Nations Grand Slam, the 2023–24 SVNS and the gold medal at the 2024 Summer Olympics men's rugby sevens tournament in Paris.

== Early life ==
Dupont was born in Lannemezan, Hautes-Pyrénées, but grew up in the nearby village of Castelnau-Magnoac, where he started playing rugby for Magnoac FC at the age of 4. In 2011, he joined Auch as a junior.

== Club career ==
In 2014, Dupont joined Castres in the Top 14 after the relegation of Auch in the 2013–14 Rugby Pro D2 season. In November 2016, Stade Toulousain announced Dupont's recruitment for the 2017–18 season.

In 2019, Dupont won the Top 14 with Toulouse after defeating Clermont Auvergne 24–18 in the 2018-19 final. In May 2021, Dupont won the European Rugby Champions Cup with Toulouse after defeating La Rochelle 22–17 in the 2020-2021 final. As captain, he lifted the trophy after the final whistle. In the same year, Toulouse completed the domestic and European double winning the Top 14 for the 2nd time beating La Rochelle 18–8 in the final.

In April 2023, he became the first player since records began in 2019 to record five try assists in the Champions Cup fixture in as his side went on to beat Sharks 54–20 in the quarter finals of the competition.

In May 2024, he won man of the match in the 2024 Champions Cup final defeating Leinster 31–22 at the Tottenham Hotspur Stadium to win the trophy for the second time in his career. He also went to win player of the tournament. In October 2024, he also become Top 14 player of the year at La Nuit du Rugby.

In December 2024, he got four try assists in the opening round of the 2024-25 Champions Cup as his side went on to beat Ulster 61–21. This record was just the second time since 2019 that a player had recorded four or more try assists in the competition, having only been beaten by his other tally of five assists just over a year earlier. Although he did not play in the final because of injury, Toulouse again won the Top 14 final defeating Bordeaux Bègles.

== International career ==
In 2016, Dupont was selected for the France U-20 team for the 2016 World Rugby Under 20 Championship. He was one of the stars of the tournament scoring 36 points which included 5 tries. In November 2016, he was selected for the French Barbarian team which played and beat Australia.

Dupont was called up to the French first team for the first time ahead of France's fourth 2017 Six Nations Championship match against Italy as a replacement for Maxime Machenaud. He made his debut in that game coming on for Baptiste Serin in the 72nd minute of an eventual 40–18 away win.

In 2020, Dupont was named Player of the Championship during following the 2020 Six Nations Championship.

In 2022, Dupont was named as France's stand-in captain in the absence of Charles Ollivon. Later that year, France won the 2022 Six Nations Championship, achieving the Grand Slam as a result. This was France's first Six Nations Championship win since 2010. Dupont was awarded Player of the Championship for the second time. Though France did not win the 2023 Six Nations tournament, Dupont claimed his third Player of the Championship trophy, equalling Brian O'Driscoll as the only player to win the award three times.

He is the third French captain after Fabien Pelous and Thierry Dusautoir to have beaten Australia, New Zealand, and South Africa. He was selected to captain the 34-man squad for France as they hosted the 2023 Rugby World Cup. They would advance past the Pool stage, however they exited the tournament in the quarterfinals after losing to eventual winners South Africa.

In November 2024, he led France to a third consecutive win over New Zealand during the 2024 Autumn Nations Series. This equalled France's all time record for consecutive wins over the All Blacks.

In February 2025, he scored two tries and won man of the match, playing at both scrum-half and fly half during a 73–24 away victory over Italy in the 2025 Six Nations. This performance earned him player of the round in a fan poll. In the penultimate round of the tournament, he sustained an anterior cruciate ligament injury while standing near a ruck with Andrew Porter and Tadhg Beirne during a 42–27 victory over Ireland. The injury ruled him out for the rest of the season. Despite this, France did go on to win the 2025 Six Nations after 35–16 victory over Scotland in the final round with Dupont lifting the trophy alongside Grégory Alldritt.

In November 2026, during the 2026 Nations Championship, he started at fly half because of injuries to four players who would have ordinarily started in that position, during a 21–19 victory against South Africa.

=== France 7s ===
During the 2023/24 SVNS season, Dupont helped France 7s win the Los Angeles tournament and later the Madrid tournament. By winning the latter, France 7s became champions for the first time in history. He was absent for France 15s during the 2024 Six Nations Championship due to his commitment to France 7s.

During the 2024 Olympics in Paris, he played a key role and scored the last try vs Argentina in the quarter finals. France would reach the final where they would face Fiji and Dupont again shone, scoring and assisting and helping France secure their first ever gold medal in Sevens.

== Personal life ==
Dupont graduated from high school in 2014, obtaining his baccalaureate in science, particularly biology and natural science. He then completed an undergraduate degree (licence) in science and techniques of physical and sports activities (STAPS) at the Toulouse III - Paul Sabatier University in 2018. After graduation, Dupont attended the Toulouse School of Management, a public management school which is part of the Toulouse 1 Capitole University, from 2018 to 2020 and earned as a graduate a master's degree in sport management.

With his older brother Clément, he bought and renovated an old rural estate located in his childhood village that belonged to his grandparents. The venue reopened in 2021 and is used for parties, wedding receptions, and other types of corporate events.

In addition to his native French, Dupont can speak English.

In March 2025, Dupont began a relationship with former Miss France and Miss Universe winner Iris Mittenaere.

=== Commercial endorsements ===
An acclaimed and popular athlete, Dupont is one of the highest-paid French players with income of £1.2 million per season, as of 2026. In addition to his salary and bonuses, he has endorsements with many brands and global companies, including Adidas, Peugeot, Volvic and Tissot while he was sponsored by Land Rover until 2021. In 2016, he signed a sponsorship contract with the German sportswear and equipment supplier on a deal worth €40,000 per year. In 2022, he became a brand ambassador for retail company Groupe Casino and France state-owned railway company SNCF. Additionally, he appeared on the cover of video game Rugby 22 alongside Cheslin Kolbe and Will Skelton.

=== Other appearances ===
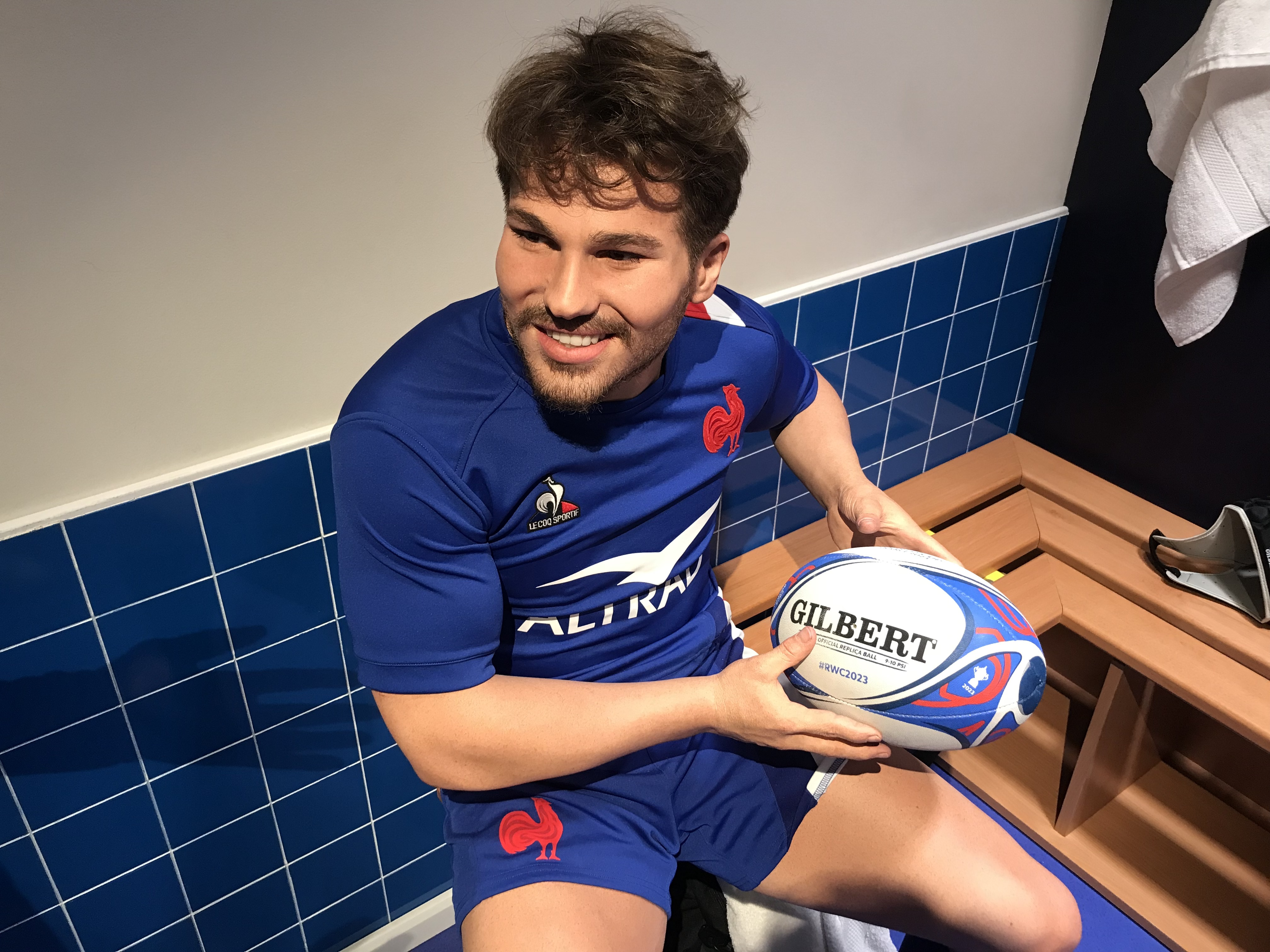
Dupont wax figure unveiled in 2023

Dupont has been involved in films and series focused on Toulouse. From 7 November 2020 to June 2021, French filmmakers Éric Hannezo and Matthieu Vollaire filmed a 107-minute black and white documentary feature film Le Stade, which follows the French club during Stade Toulousain's 2020-21 Champions Cup and Top 14 successful campaign, after having shot more than 600 hours of dailies for weeks. The movie was theatrically released on 13 April 2022 in France by Pathé and was watched by around 67,000 spectators in the cinemas domestically. A sports docuseries of the same name, using unseen footage and containing four 40-minute episodes, was released on the streaming service Paramount+ on 22 December 2022.

Alongside former rugby union player Sébastien Chabal, Formula One driver Esteban Ocon, astronaut Thomas Pesquet and multiple French artists, he took part in the 2023 Les Enfoirés charity concert edition for the Restaurants du Cœur. The show was broadcast by TF1 on 3 March and had an audience of more than 8 million viewers.

He appeared in the video clip for the song Dernière by French rappers Bigflo & Oli, released in June 2023. A tribute song was also dedicated to him the same month, and a biographical comic book was released in September 2023.

About three months prior to the kick-off of the 2023 Rugby World Cup opening match, a wax figure of Dupont went on display at the Musée Grévin in Paris.

== Career statistics ==
=== List of international tries ===
No.	Date	Venue	Opponent	Score	Result	Competition
1	16 March 2019	Stadio Olimpico, Rome, Italy	Italy	3–5	14–25	2019 Six Nations
2	17 August 2019	Allianz Riviera, Nice, France	Scotland	30–3	32–3	2019 Rugby World Cup warm-up matches
3	30 August 2019	Stade de France, Saint-Denis, France	Italy	24–7	47–19	2019 Rugby World Cup warm-up matches
4	21 September 2019	Tokyo Stadium, Chōfu, Japan	Argentina	12–3	23–21	2019 Rugby World Cup
5	24 October 2020	Stade de France, Saint-Denis, France	Wales	12–13	38–21	Test Match
6	24 October 2020	Stade de France, Saint-Denis, France	Wales	19–13	38–21	Test Match
7	31 October 2020	Stade de France, Saint-Denis, France	Ireland	5–0	35–27	2020 Six Nations
8	6 February 2021	Stadio Olimpico, Rome, Italy	Italy	3–36	10–50	2021 Six Nations
9	13 March 2021	Twickenham, London, England	England	0–5	23–20	2021 Six Nations
10	20 March 2021	Stade de France, Saint-Denis, France	Wales	12–7	32–30	2021 Six Nations
11	12 February 2022	Stade de France, Saint-Denis, France	Ireland	5–0	30–24	2022 Six Nations
12	19 March 2022	Stade de France, Saint-Denis, France	England	23–13	25–13	2022 Six Nations
13	21 September 2023	Stade Vélodrome, Marseille, France	Namibia	45–0	96–0	2023 Rugby World Cup
14	23 February 2025	Stadio Olimpico, Rome, Italy	Italy	10–19	24–73	2025 Six Nations
15	23 February 2025	Stadio Olimpico, Rome, Italy	Italy	17–52	24–73	2025 Six Nations
16	7 March 2026	Murrayfield Stadium, Edinburgh, Scotland	Scotland	47–19	50–40	2026 Six Nations

Correct as of 23 February 2025

=== International analysis by opposition ===
Opposition	Played	Win	Loss	Draw	Tries	Points	Win %
Argentina	4	4	0	0	1	5	1.000
Australia	2	2	0	0	0	0	1.000
England	6	3	3	0	2	10	.500
Fiji	1	0	1	0	0	0	.000
Georgia	1	1	0	0	0	0	1.000
Ireland	7	4	3	0	2	10	.571
Italy	8	8	0	0	5	25	1.000
Japan	2	1	0	1	0	0	.750
New Zealand	5	4	1	0	0	0	.800
Scotland	9	6	3	0	1	5	.667
South Africa	5	1	4	0	0	0	.200
Tonga	1	1	0	0	0	0	1.000
Namibia	1	1	0	0	1	5	1.000
Wales	8	7	1	0	3	15	.875
Career	60	43	16	1	15	75	.725

as of 15 March 2025

== Honours ==
Toulouse

- European Rugby Champions Cup:
  - Winner: 2021, 2024
- Top 14:
  - Winner: 2019, 2021, 2023, 2024, 2025, 2026

France

- Six Nations Grand Slam:
  - Winner: 2022
- Six Nations Championship:
  - Winner: 2022, 2025, 2026
- Dave Gallaher Trophy:
  - Winner: 2021, 2024
- Trophée des Bicentenaires:
  - Winner: 2022, 2023
- Auld Alliance Trophy:
  - Winner: 2019, 2022, 2023
- Giuseppe Garibaldi Trophy:
  - Winner: 2017, 2019, 2020, 2021, 2022, 2023, 2025, 2026
- Solidarity Trophy:
  - Winner: 2026

France 7

- Rugby sevens at the Summer Olympics:
  - Gold Medalist: 2024
- HSBC SVNS Series:
  - Winner: 2024
- Spain Sevens:
  - Winner: 2024
- USA Sevens:
  - Winner: 2024

Individual

- World Rugby Men's 15s Player of the Year:
  - Winner: 2021
  - Nominee: 2022, 2023
- World Rugby Men's Sevens Player of the Year:
  - Winner: 2024
- World Rugby Men's 15s Dream Team of the Year:
  - Winner: 2021, 2022, 2023
- World Rugby Men's Sevens Dream Team of the Year:
  - Winner: 2024
- Six Nations Player of the Championship:
  - Winner: 2020, 2022, 2023
  - Nominee: 2021
- Six Nations Team of the Championship:
  - Winner: 2021, 2022, 2023, 2025
- European Player of the Year:
  - Winner: 2021, 2024
- Nuit du rugby International Player of the Season:
  - Winner: 2021, 2022, 2023, 2024
- Nuit du rugby Player of the Season:
  - Winner: 2021, 2023, 2024
- Nuit du rugby Breakthrough Player of the Season:
  - Winner: 2017
- Oscars du Midi olympique World Award:
  - Winner: 2021, 2022, 2023, 2024
- Oscars du Midi olympique Golden Award:
  - Winner: 2019, 2020, 2021, 2022, 2024
- Rugby World World's Best Player:
  - Winner: 2021
- 2023–24 SVNS Rookie of the Year Award:
  - Winner: 2023–2024
- 2023–24 SVNS Player of the Year Award:
  - Winner: 2023–2024
- 2023–24 SVNS Dream Team:
  - Winner: 2023–2024
- 2024 Canada Sevens Dream Team:
  - Winner: 2024
- 2024 USA Sevens Dream Team:
  - Winner: 2024
- 2024 Spain Sevens Dream Team:
  - Winner: 2024

Orders

- Knight of the Legion of Honour:
  - Decoration: 2024

== Filmography ==
=== Film ===
Year	Title	Role	Notes	Ref.
2022	Le Stade	Himself	Documentary	

=== Television ===
Year	Title	Role	Notes	Ref.
2022	Le Stade	Himself	Docuseries	

== See also ==
- List of France national rugby union players
- List of Six Nations Championship Player of the Championship winners
- List of Rugby World Cup try scorers
