= Solidarity Trophy =

Men's and women's rugby union trophy

- Sport: Rugby union
- Founded: 2026; 0 years ago
- No. of teams: 2
- Country: France; Ireland
- Most recent champion: France (2026)

The Solidarity Trophy (French: Trophée Solidarité; Irish: Corn Dlúthpháirtíochta), also known as the "Celtic Crunch", is an international rugby union trophy awarded to the winner of the annual Six Nations Championship match between France and Ireland.

The trophy, first awarded in 2026, celebrates "the deep historical and cultural ties between the two nations." The trophy was designed by Thomas Lyte, British silversmith and goldsmith and royal warrant holder to King Charles III.

Overall, the 2026 match was the 105th between the two countries.

== Matches ==
| Host nation | Played | France wins | Ireland wins | Drawn | France points | Ireland points |
|---|---|---|---|---|---|---|
| France | 1 | 1 | 0 | 0 | 36 | 14 |
| Ireland | 0 | 0 | 0 | 0 | 0 | 0 |
| Overall | 1 | 1 | 0 | 0 | 36 | 14 |

== Results ==
| Year | Date | Venue | Home | Score | Away | Trophy Winner |
|---|---|---|---|---|---|---|
| 2026 | 5 February | Stade de France, Saint-Denis | France | 36–14 | Ireland | (France) |

== See also ==
- Other rivalry cups involving France:
  - Auld Alliance Trophy, trophy contested between France and Scotland
  - Giuseppe Garibaldi Trophy, annual award for the winners of the Six Nations match between France and Italy
  - Trophée des Bicentenaires, contested between France and Australia
  - Dave Gallagher Trophy contested between France and New Zealand
- Other rivalry cups involving Ireland:
  - Centenary Quaich, held between Ireland and Scotland
  - Millennium Trophy, for winners of England and Ireland in the Six Nations Championship
  - Admiral Brown Cup awarded to the winners of matches between Ireland and Argentina
  - Lansdowne Cup awarded to the winners of matches between Ireland and Australia
- France–Ireland relations
