= Centenary Quaich =

Rugby union annual contest

- Current season or competition: 2026 Six Nations Championship
- Sport: Rugby union
- Instituted: 1989
- Number of teams: 2
- Country: Ireland; Scotland
- Holders: Ireland (2026)
- Most titles: Ireland (23 titles)

The Centenary Quaich (/ˈkweɪx/) is an international rugby union award contested annually by Ireland and Scotland as part of the Six Nations Championship.

A "Quaich" is a Gaelic drinking vessel and has been presented to the winners of the fixture since 1989. It was introduced to mark the centenary of the founding of the International Rugby Football Board (founded 1887, which later became World Rugby). Since the introduction of the cup, Ireland have won it twenty-three times while Scotland have won it fourteen times, with one drawn fixture. The Quaich is not contested in matches between the two sides outside the Six Nations. For example, the trophy was not awarded for pool matches between the two sides during the 2019 and 2023 Rugby World Cups.

The Quaich is one of a number of similar cups contested between nations as part of their international fixture list. Several of the other rivalry trophies involve either Ireland or Scotland. Other examples within the Six Nations Championship include the oldest such trophy, the Calcutta Cup (Scotland vs. England), the Millennium Trophy (England vs. Ireland), the Doddie Weir Cup between Scotland and Wales, the Solidarity Trophy between France and Ireland, and the Auld Alliance Trophy between France and Scotland. The Giuseppe Garibaldi Trophy (France vs. Italy) is the only current rivalry trophy within the six Nations Championship not involving at least one of the Scotland and Ireland teams.

The contest for the Quaich has been notable for periods of dominance by one or other team. Scotland held the trophy for the first eleven years of the competition, including one draw where they retained the Quaich. On the other Ireland have dominated from 2000 onwards, winning 23 out of 27 contests thereafter.

The current holders are Ireland who won a ninth successive contest after beating Scotland at the Aviva Stadium on 14 March 2026.

== Summary ==
=== Overall ===
Host	Played	Wins for		Draws	Points for	
Host	Played	Ireland	Scotland	Draws	Ireland	Scotland
Ireland	19	13	5	1	473	279
Scotland	19	10	9	0	475	367
Overall	38	23	14	1	948	646

=== Records ===
Note: Date shown in brackets indicates when the record was or last set.

Record	Ireland	Scotland
Longest winning streak	9 (10 Mar 2018–14 March 2026)	5 (4 Feb 1995–18 Feb 2000)
Largest points for
Home	44 (19 February 2000)	38 (1 March 1997)
Away	40 (21 March 2015)	25 (19 March 2016)
Largest winning margin
Home	22 (14 March 2026)	28 (1 March 1997)
Away	30 (16 February 2003)/(21 March 2015)	8 (15 February 1992)

== Results ==
Year	Date	Venue	Home	Score	Away	Trophy Winner	Report
1989	4 March	Murrayfield, Edinburgh	Scotland	37–21	Ireland	Scotland	
1990	3 February	Lansdowne Road, Dublin	Ireland	10–13	Scotland	Scotland	
1991	16 March	Murrayfield, Edinburgh	Scotland	28–25	Ireland	Scotland	
1992	15 February	Lansdowne Road, Dublin	Ireland	10–18	Scotland	Scotland	
1993	16 January	Murrayfield, Edinburgh	Scotland	15–3	Ireland	Scotland	
1994	5 March	Lansdowne Road, Dublin	Ireland	6–6	Scotland	Draw (Scotland) retain	
1995	4 February	Murrayfield, Edinburgh	Scotland	26–13	Ireland	Scotland	
1996	20 January	Lansdowne Road, Dublin	Ireland	10–16	Scotland	Scotland	
1997	1 March	Murrayfield, Edinburgh	Scotland	38–10	Ireland	Scotland	
1998	7 February	Lansdowne Road, Dublin	Ireland	16–17	Scotland	Scotland	
1999	20 March	Murrayfield, Edinburgh	Scotland	30–13	Ireland	Scotland	
2000	19 February	Lansdowne Road, Dublin	Ireland	44–22	Scotland	Ireland	
2001	22 September	Murrayfield, Edinburgh	Scotland	32–10	Ireland	Scotland	
2002	2 March	Lansdowne Road, Dublin	Ireland	43–22	Scotland	Ireland	
2003	16 February	Murrayfield, Edinburgh	Scotland	6–36	Ireland	Ireland	
2004	27 March	Lansdowne Road, Dublin	Ireland	37–16	Scotland	Ireland	
2005	12 February	Murrayfield, Edinburgh	Scotland	13–40	Ireland	Ireland	
2006	11 March	Lansdowne Road, Dublin	Ireland	15–9	Scotland	Ireland	
2007	10 March	Murrayfield, Edinburgh	Scotland	18–19	Ireland	Ireland	
2008	23 February	Croke Park, Dublin	Ireland	34–13	Scotland	Ireland	
2009	14 March	Murrayfield, Edinburgh	Scotland	15–22	Ireland	Ireland	
2010	20 March	Croke Park, Dublin	Ireland	20–23	Scotland	Scotland	
2011	27 February	Murrayfield, Edinburgh	Scotland	18–21	Ireland	Ireland	
2012	10 March	Aviva Stadium, Dublin	Ireland	32–14	Scotland	Ireland	
2013	24 February	Murrayfield, Edinburgh	Scotland	12–8	Ireland	Scotland	
2014	2 February	Aviva Stadium, Dublin	Ireland	28–6	Scotland	Ireland	
2015	21 March	Murrayfield, Edinburgh	Scotland	10–40	Ireland	Ireland	
2016	19 March	Aviva Stadium, Dublin	Ireland	35–25	Scotland	Ireland	
2017	4 February	Murrayfield, Edinburgh	Scotland	27–22	Ireland	Scotland	
2018	10 March	Aviva Stadium, Dublin	Ireland	28–8	Scotland	Ireland	
2019	9 February	Murrayfield, Edinburgh	Scotland	13–22	Ireland	Ireland	
2020	1 February	Aviva Stadium, Dublin	Ireland	19–12	Scotland	Ireland	
2021	14 March	Murrayfield, Edinburgh	Scotland	24–27	Ireland	Ireland	
2022	19 March	Aviva Stadium, Dublin	Ireland	26–5	Scotland	Ireland	
2023	12 March	Murrayfield Stadium, Edinburgh	Scotland	7–22	Ireland	Ireland	
2024	16 March	Aviva Stadium, Dublin	Ireland	17–13	Scotland	Ireland	
2025	9 February	Murrayfield Stadium, Edinburgh	Scotland	18–32	Ireland	Ireland	
2026	14 March	Aviva Stadium, Dublin	Ireland	43–21	Scotland	Ireland	

== See also ==
- History of rugby union matches between Ireland and Scotland
