= History of rugby union matches between France and Ireland =

Since 1909, France and Ireland have played each other in a total of 105 test matches, with France winning 61 times, Ireland winning 37 times and seven matches drawn.

Apart from fixtures played in the Five Nations / Six Nations Championship competitions, four games have been played at the Rugby World Cup in 1995, 2003, 2007 and 2015, in which France were victorious in the first three and Ireland in the last one in 2015. The sides have also met on four other occasions outside the Five Nations / Six Nations Championship: in 1909 (the first match between the two teams), a one-off match in 1972 and two Rugby World Cup warm-up matches in 2011.

Ireland have had a notoriously poor record in France since the end of the Second World War, only winning there thrice between 1945 and 2000 (in 1948, 1952 and 1972), and only four times since 2000. In recent years, France have found wins in Dublin almost as difficult; it is one of the Six Nations fixtures with the most distinctive records of home advantage winning out.

As of 2026, the winner of the annual Six Nations Championship matches between France and Ireland in both the men's and women's versions will be awarded a rivalry trophy, the Solidarity Trophy/Tropheé Solidaritaire. France are the current holders of the men's trophy having won the inaugural edition of the new competition 36–14 in Paris.

== Breakdown ==
In the World Cup, the teams have played each other on four occasions, 1995, 2003, 2007 and 2015, with France winning on 3 occasions and Ireland winning once; there have been no draws. In these games, France have scored 113 points, and Ireland 60.

In the Five Nations (1910–1931 and 1947–1999), Ireland played France on 70 occasions, Ireland winning 23, France 42 and five matches have been drawn.

In the Six Nations (2000–present), Ireland have played France on 27 occasions, Ireland winning 11, France 14 and two matches have been drawn.

In other test matches, Ireland have played France on four other occasions, in 1909, 1972 and twice in 2011, with two wins apiece.

== Summary ==
Note: Summary below reflects test results by both teams.

=== Overview ===
Details	Played	Won by France	Won by Ireland	Drawn	France points	Ireland points
In France	51	36	13	2	979	574
In Ireland	51	23	23	5	690	719
Neutral venue	3	2	1	0	88	57
Overall	105	61	37	7	1,757	1,350

=== Records ===
Note: Date shown in brackets indicates when the record was or last set.

Record	France	Ireland
Longest winning streak	15 (1 February 1986 – 19 March 2000)	6 (26 January 1924 – 25 January 1930)
Largest points for
Home	45 (17 February 1996)	32 (11 February 2023)
Away	42 (8 March 2025)	38 (2 February 2024)
Neutral	43 (9 November 2003)	24 (11 October 2015)
Largest winning margin
Home	39 (6 April 2002)	24 (24 March 1913)
Away	19 (26 January 1963)	21 (2 February 2024)
Neutral	24 (10 June 1995)	15 (11 October 2015)

=== Attendance ===
Up to date as of 14 February 2026.

Total attendance*	4,622,918
Average attendance*	46,229
Highest attendance	82,000; Ireland 30–21 France; 7 February 2009
*Excludes three matches in which no attendance was reported and two matches in which COVID restricted attendance

== Results ==
No.	Date	Venue	Score	Winner	Competition	Attendance	Ref.
1	20 March 1909	Lansdowne Road, Dublin	19–8	Ireland	1909 France tour of Ireland	7,000	
2	28 March 1910	Parc des Princes, Paris	3–8	Ireland	1910 Five Nations Championship	10,000	
3	25 March 1911	Mardyke, Cork	25–5	Ireland	1911 Five Nations Championship	25,000	
4	1 January 1912	Parc des Princes, Paris	6–11	Ireland	1912 Five Nations Championship	18,000	
5	24 March 1913	Mardyke, Cork	24–0	Ireland	1913 Five Nations Championship	6,000	
6	1 January 1914	Parc des Princes, Paris	6–8	Ireland	1914 Five Nations Championship	25,000	
7	3 April 1920	Lansdowne Road, Dublin	7–15	France	1920 Five Nations Championship	40,000	
8	9 April 1921	Stade Yves-du-Manoir, Colombes	20–10	France	1921 Five Nations Championship	35,000	
9	8 April 1922	Lansdowne Road, Dublin	8–3	Ireland	1922 Five Nations Championship	40,000	
10	14 April 1923	Stade Yves-du-Manoir, Colombes	14–8	France	1923 Five Nations Championship	20,000	
11	26 January 1924	Lansdowne Road, Dublin	6–0	Ireland	1924 Five Nations Championship	20,000	
12	1 January 1925	Stade Yves-du-Manoir, Colombes	3–9	Ireland	1925 Five Nations Championship	35,000	
13	1 January 1926	Ravenhill Stadium, Belfast	11–0	Ireland	1926 Five Nations Championship	20,000	
14	1 January 1927	Stade Yves-du-Manoir, Colombes	3–8	Ireland	1927 Five Nations Championship	30,000	
15	28 January 1928	Ravenhill Stadium, Belfast	12–8	Ireland	1928 Five Nations Championship	20,000	
16	31 December 1928	Stade Yves-du-Manoir, Colombes	0–6	Ireland	1929 Five Nations Championship	42,000	
17	25 January 1930	Ravenhill Stadium, Belfast	0–5	France	1930 Five Nations Championship	25,000	
18	1 January 1931	Stade Yves-du-Manoir, Colombes	3–0	France	1931 Five Nations Championship	28,000	
19	25 January 1947	Lansdowne Road, Dublin	8–12	France	1947 Five Nations Championship	—N/a	
20	1 January 1948	Stade Yves-du-Manoir, Colombes	6–13	Ireland	1948 Five Nations Championship	25,000	
21	29 January 1949	Lansdowne Road, Dublin	9–16	France	1949 Five Nations Championship	35,000	
22	28 January 1950	Stade Yves-du-Manoir, Colombes	3–3	draw	1950 Five Nations Championship	35,000	
23	27 January 1951	Lansdowne Road, Dublin	9–8	Ireland	1951 Five Nations Championship	45,000	
24	26 January 1952	Stade Yves-du-Manoir, Colombes	8–11	Ireland	1952 Five Nations Championship	38,830	
25	24 January 1953	Ravenhill Stadium, Belfast	16–3	Ireland	1953 Five Nations Championship	38,000	
26	23 January 1954	Stade Yves-du-Manoir, Colombes	8–0	France	1954 Five Nations Championship	29,391	
27	22 January 1955	Lansdowne Road, Dublin	3–5	France	1955 Five Nations Championship	45,000	
28	28 January 1956	Stade Yves-du-Manoir, Colombes	14–8	France	1956 Five Nations Championship	26,054	
29	26 January 1957	Lansdowne Road, Dublin	11–6	Ireland	1957 Five Nations Championship	45,000	
30	19 April 1958	Stade Yves-du-Manoir, Colombes	11–6	France	1958 Five Nations Championship	25,043	
31	18 April 1959	Lansdowne Road, Dublin	9–5	Ireland	1959 Five Nations Championship	40,000	
32	9 April 1960	Stade Yves-du-Manoir, Colombes	23–6	France	1960 Five Nations Championship	30,700	
33	15 April 1961	Lansdowne Road, Dublin	3–15	France	1961 Five Nations Championship	50,000	
34	14 April 1962	Stade Yves-du-Manoir, Colombes	11–0	France	1962 Five Nations Championship	28,318	
35	26 January 1963	Lansdowne Road, Dublin	5–24	France	1963 Five Nations Championship	30,000	
36	11 April 1964	Stade Yves-du-Manoir, Colombes	27–6	France	1964 Five Nations Championship	21,640	
37	23 January 1965	Lansdowne Road, Dublin	3–3	draw	1965 Five Nations Championship	55,000	
38	29 January 1966	Stade Yves-du-Manoir, Colombes	11–6	France	1966 Five Nations Championship	30,947	
39	15 April 1967	Lansdowne Road, Dublin	6–11	France	1967 Five Nations Championship	50,000	
40	27 January 1968	Stade Yves-du-Manoir, Colombes	16–6	France	1968 Five Nations Championship	28,148	
41	25 January 1969	Lansdowne Road, Dublin	17–9	Ireland	1969 Five Nations Championship	50,000	
42	24 January 1970	Stade Yves-du-Manoir, Colombes	8–0	France	1970 Five Nations Championship	35,915	
43	30 January 1971	Lansdowne Road, Dublin	9–9	draw	1971 Five Nations Championship	55,000	
44	29 January 1972	Stade Yves-du-Manoir, Colombes	9–14	Ireland	1972 Five Nations Championship	26,939	
45	29 April 1972	Lansdowne Road, Dublin	24–14	Ireland	Spring International (Note: The 1972 match between Ireland and France was a one-off test match organised to assist the IRFU financially as there 1972 Five Nations Championship fixtures against Scotland and Wales were cancelled. Following this match France toured Australia.)	35,000	
46	14 April 1973	Lansdowne Road, Dublin	6–4	Ireland	1973 Five Nations Championship	50,000	
47	19 January 1974	Parc des Princes, Paris	9–6	France	1974 Five Nations Championship	43,694	
48	1 March 1975	Lansdowne Road, Dublin	25–6	Ireland	1975 Five Nations Championship	50,000	
49	7 February 1976	Parc des Princes, Paris	26–3	France	1976 Five Nations Championship	42,585	
50	19 March 1977	Lansdowne Road, Dublin	6–15	France	1977 Five Nations Championship	50,000	
51	18 February 1978	Parc des Princes, Paris	10–9	France	1978 Five Nations Championship	43,639	
52	20 January 1979	Lansdowne Road, Dublin	9–9	draw	1979 Five Nations Championship	51,000	
53	1 March 1980	Parc des Princes, Paris	19–18	France	1980 Five Nations Championship	45,239	
54	7 February 1981	Lansdowne Road, Dublin	13–19	France	1981 Five Nations Championship	51,000	
55	20 March 1982	Parc des Princes, Paris	22–9	France	1982 Five Nations Championship	45,238	
56	19 February 1983	Lansdowne Road, Dublin	22–16	Ireland	1983 Five Nations Championship	50,000	
57	21 January 1984	Parc des Princes, Paris	25–12	France	1984 Five Nations Championship	45,023	
58	2 March 1985	Lansdowne Road, Dublin	15–15	draw	1985 Five Nations Championship	56,000	
59	1 February 1986	Parc des Princes, Paris	29–9	France	1986 Five Nations Championship	49,238	
60	21 March 1987	Lansdowne Road, Dublin	13–19	France	1987 Five Nations Championship	53,000	
61	20 February 1988	Parc des Princes, Paris	25–6	France	1988 Five Nations Championship	49,130	
62	21 January 1989	Lansdowne Road, Dublin	21–26	France	1989 Five Nations Championship	52,000	
63	3 March 1990	Parc des Princes, Paris	31–12	France	1990 Five Nations Championship	45,077	
64	2 February 1991	Lansdowne Road, Dublin	13–21	France	1991 Five Nations Championship	50,000	
65	21 March 1992	Parc des Princes, Paris	44–12	France	1992 Five Nations Championship	49,317	
66	20 February 1993	Lansdowne Road, Dublin	6–21	France	1993 Five Nations Championship	60,000	
67	15 January 1994	Parc des Princes, Paris	35–15	France	1994 Five Nations Championship	—N/a	
68	4 March 1995	Lansdowne Road, Dublin	7–25	France	1995 Five Nations Championship	—N/a	
69	10 June 1995	Kings Park Stadium, Durban (South Africa)	36–12	France	1995 Rugby World Cup	20,000	
70	17 February 1996	Parc des Princes, Paris	45–10	France	1996 Five Nations Championship	45,122	
71	18 January 1997	Lansdowne Road, Dublin	15–32	France	1997 Five Nations Championship	53,000	
72	7 March 1998	Stade de France, Saint-Denis	18–16	France	1998 Five Nations Championship	78,000	
73	6 February 1999	Lansdowne Road, Dublin	9–10	France	1999 Five Nations Championship	49,000	
74	19 March 2000	Stade de France, Saint-Denis	25–27	Ireland	2000 Six Nations Championship	78,500	
75	17 February 2001	Lansdowne Road, Dublin	22–15	Ireland	2001 Six Nations Championship	47,500	
76	6 April 2002	Stade de France, Saint-Denis	44–5	France	2002 Six Nations Championship	79,978	
77	8 March 2003	Lansdowne Road, Dublin	15–12	Ireland	2003 Six Nations Championship	47,500	
78	9 November 2003	Docklands Stadium, Melbourne (Australia)	43–21	France	2003 Rugby World Cup	33,134	
79	14 February 2004	Stade de France, Saint-Denis	35–17	France	2004 Six Nations Championship	79,547	
80	12 March 2005	Lansdowne Road, Dublin	19–26	France	2005 Six Nations Championship	49,250	
81	11 February 2006	Stade de France, Saint-Denis	43–31	France	2006 Six Nations Championship	79,939	
82	11 February 2007	Croke Park, Dublin	17–20	France	2007 Six Nations Championship	81,572	
83	21 September 2007	Stade de France, Saint-Denis	25–3	France	2007 Rugby World Cup	80,267	
84	9 February 2008	Stade de France, Saint-Denis	26–21	France	2008 Six Nations Championship	79,270	
85	7 February 2009	Croke Park, Dublin	30–21	Ireland	2009 Six Nations Championship	82,000	
86	13 February 2010	Stade de France, Saint-Denis	33–10	France	2010 Six Nations Championship	80,000	
87	13 February 2011	Aviva Stadium, Dublin	22–25	France	2011 Six Nations Championship	51,700	
88	13 August 2011	Stade Chaban-Delmas, Bordeaux	19–12	France	2011 Rugby World Cup warm-up match	32,653	
89	20 August 2011	Aviva Stadium, Dublin	22–26	France	2011 Rugby World Cup warm-up match	45,165	
90	4 March 2012	Stade de France, Saint-Denis	17–17	draw	2012 Six Nations Championship	79,600	
91	9 March 2013	Aviva Stadium, Dublin	13–13	draw	2013 Six Nations Championship	51,000	
92	15 March 2014	Stade de France, Saint-Denis	20–22	Ireland	2014 Six Nations Championship	80,000	
93	14 February 2015	Aviva Stadium, Dublin	18–11	Ireland	2015 Six Nations Championship	51,200	
94	11 October 2015	Millennium Stadium, Cardiff (Wales)	9–24	Ireland	2015 Rugby World Cup	72,163	
95	13 February 2016	Stade de France, Saint-Denis	10–9	France	2016 Six Nations Championship	77,775	
96	25 February 2017	Aviva Stadium, Dublin	19–9	Ireland	2017 Six Nations Championship	51,700	
97	3 February 2018	Stade de France, Saint-Denis	13–15	Ireland	2018 Six Nations Championship	74,878	
98	10 March 2019	Aviva Stadium, Dublin	26–14	Ireland	2019 Six Nations Championship	51,000	
99	31 October 2020	Stade de France, Saint-Denis	35–27	France	2020 Six Nations Championship	0*	
100	14 February 2021	Aviva Stadium, Dublin	13–15	France	2021 Six Nations Championship	0*	
101	12 February 2022	Stade de France, Saint-Denis	30–24	France	2022 Six Nations Championship	80,000	
102	11 February 2023	Aviva Stadium, Dublin	32–19	Ireland	2023 Six Nations Championship	51,700	
103	2 February 2024	Stade Vélodrome, Marseille	17–38	Ireland	2024 Six Nations Championship	65,000	
104	8 March 2025	Aviva Stadium, Dublin	27–42	France	2025 Six Nations Championship	51,700	
105	5 February 2026	Stade de France, Saint-Denis	36–14	France	2026 Six Nations Championship	80,000	

== Results by Decade ==
Decade	France	Ireland	Drawn	Series winner
1900s	0	1	0	Ireland
1910s	0	5	0	Ireland
1920s	3	7	0	Ireland
1930s	2	0	0	France
1940s	2	1	0	France
1950s	4	5	1	Ireland
1960s	8	1	1	France
1970s	5	4	2	France
1980s	8	1	1	France
1990s	11	0	0	France
2000s	8	4	0	France
2010s	5	6	2	Ireland
2020s	5	2	0	France

== XV Results ==
Below is a list of matches that France has awarded matches test match status by virtue of awarding caps, but Ireland did not award caps.

Date	Venue	Score	Winner	Competition	Attendance	Ref.
26 January 1946	Lansdowne Road, Dublin	3–4	France	Victory International	40,000	
13 June 1982	Camp De La Foixarda, Barcelona	39-25	France	Exhibition Match		
14 May 1988	Stade Jaques-Fouroux, Auch	18–19	Ireland XV	1988 Ireland XV tour of France	—N/a	—N/a
18 May 1988	Stade du Moustoir, Lorient	12–7	France	1988 Ireland XV tour of France		—N/a

== Gallery ==
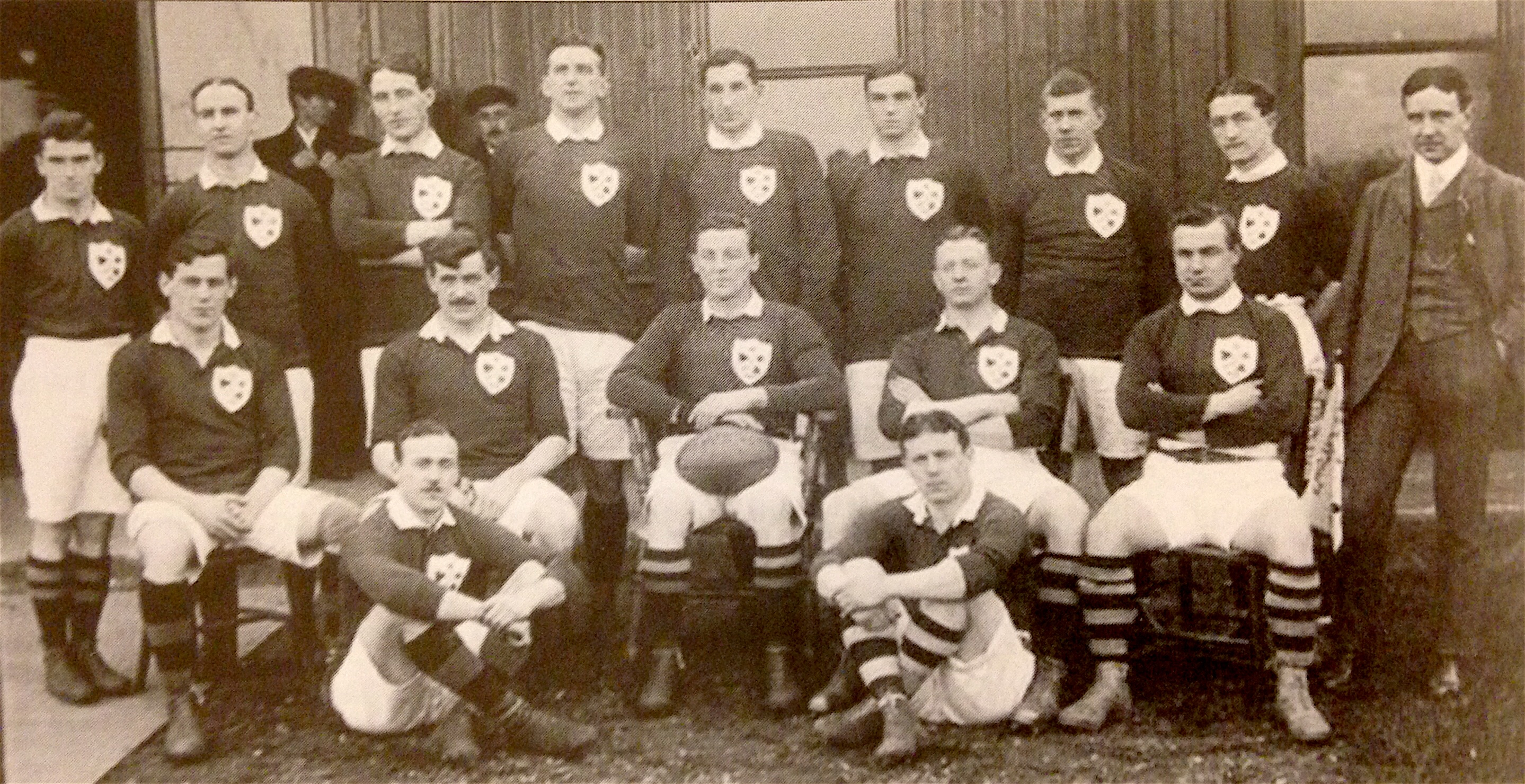
The Ireland team which played France for the first time, beating them 19–8, Ireland's biggest victory in international rugby at that time.

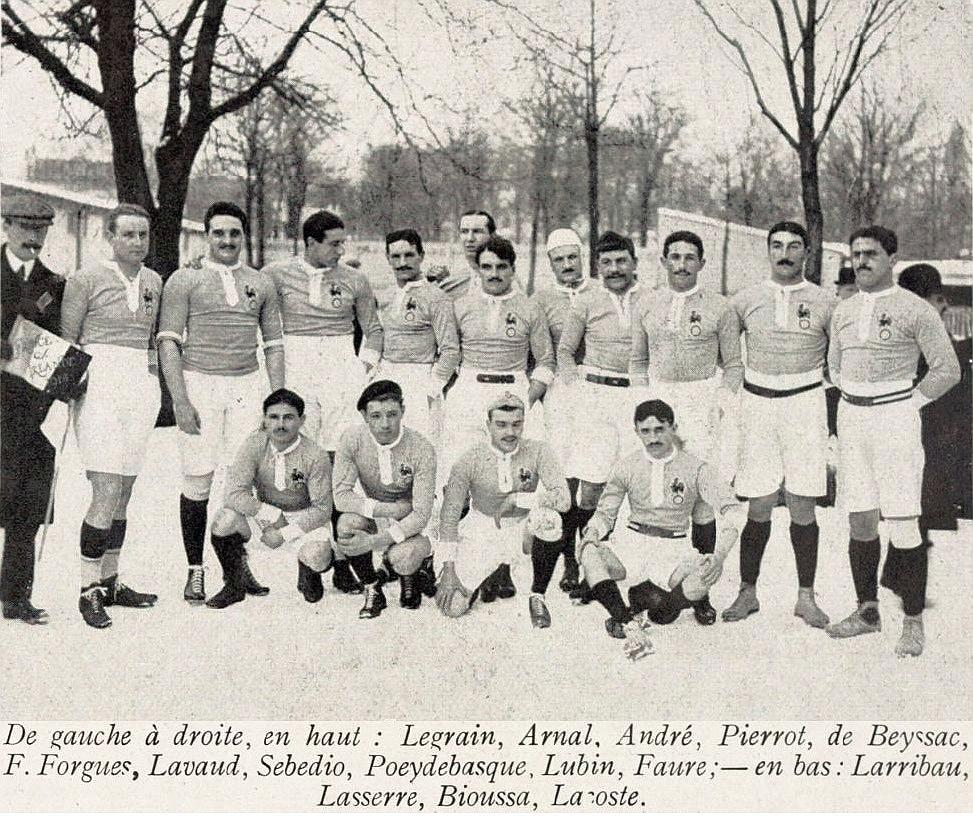
The French team which faced Ireland in the 1914 Five Nations Championship.

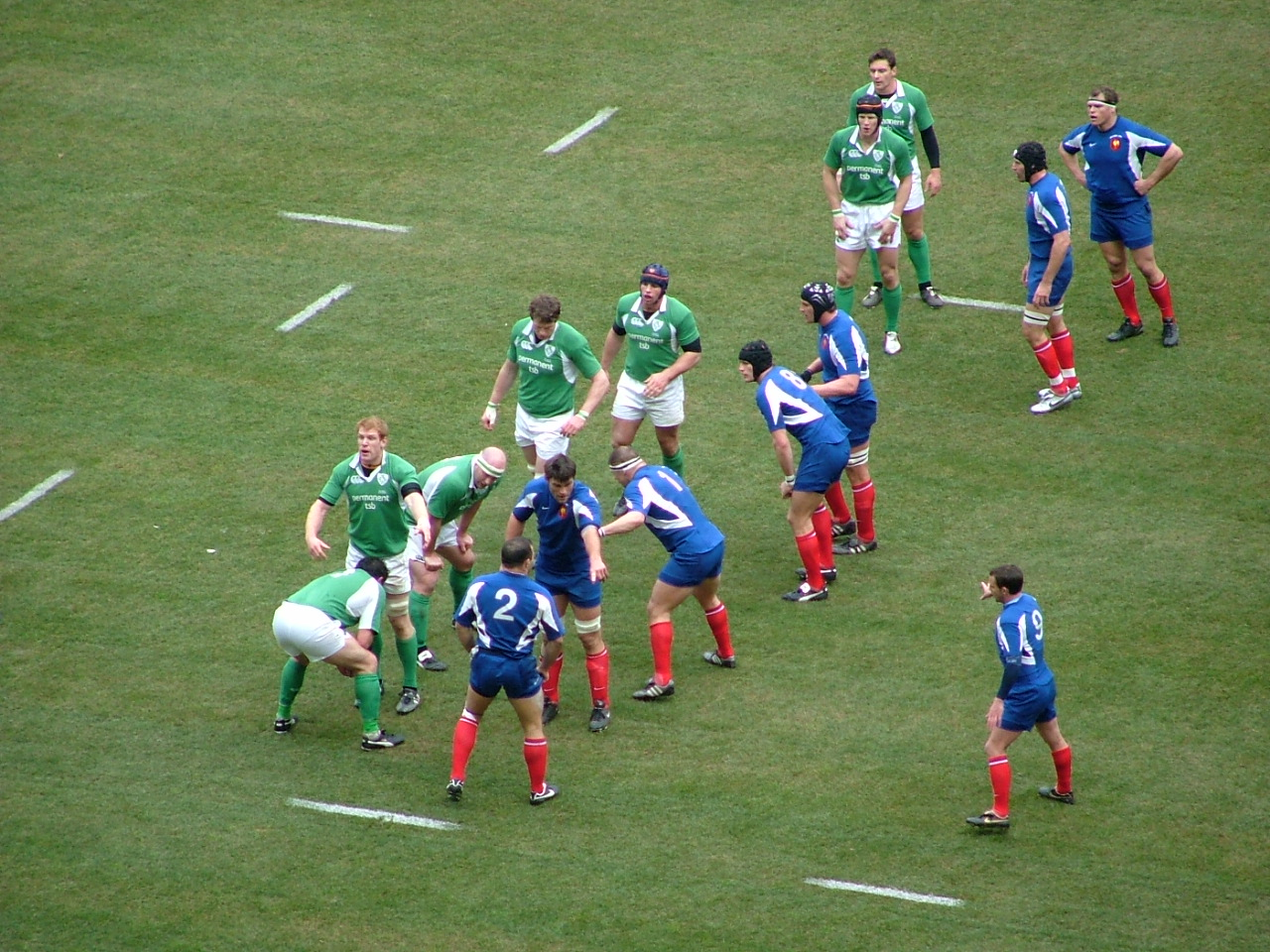
Ireland and France during the 2006 Six Nations.

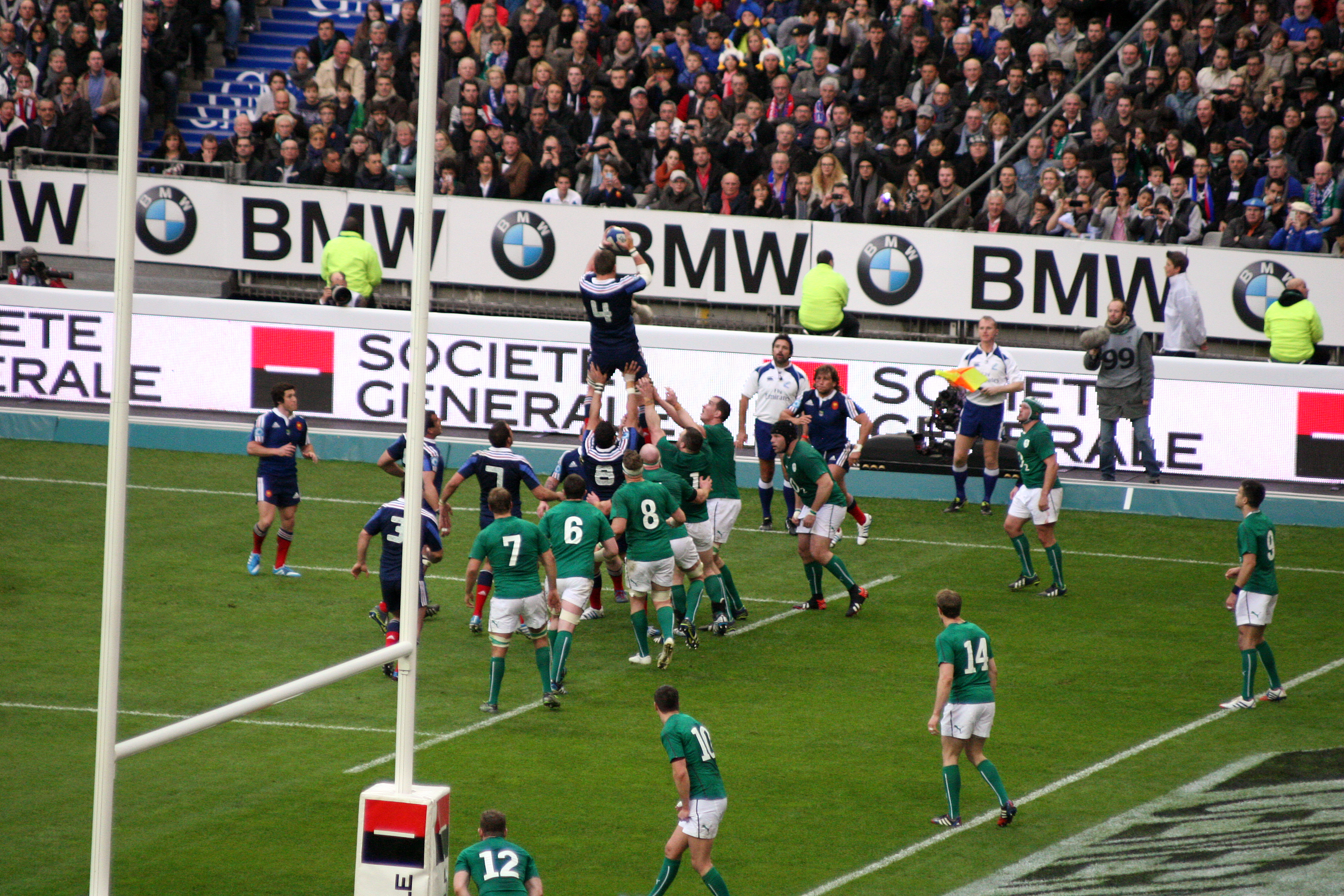
France claim a lineout during their 2014 Six Nations matchup with Ireland.
