= Midi Olympique =

- Front-page, 2 January 2023
- Type: Bi-weekly newspaper
- Owner(s): Groupe La Dépêche
- Publisher: Jean-Michel Baylet
- Founded: 1929; 96 years ago
- Language: French
- Headquarters: Avenue Jean-Baylet; 31095 Toulouse cedex
- Country: France
- Circulation: 87,643 (2008)
- ISSN: 0994-6187
- Website: www.midi-olympique.fr www.rugbyrama.fr

Midi Olympique is a French bi-weekly newspaper specializing in rugby and belonging to La Dépêche du Midi group. Its headquarters are based in Toulouse while some offices are located in Paris. The first edition was published on 2 September 1929, meaning it is one of the oldest French weekly still in existence (after Le Canard enchaîné).

Nicknamed Midol or Le Jaune (The Yellow) in reference to the color of the paper is made of, it mainly covers news from rugby union, from the professional Top 14 league to the amateur teams of the most modest levels (Fourth Series), and it also devotes a few pages to rugby league. It was published weekly on a Monday until Spring 2006 when a second edition began to be released each week on Friday. The Monday edition is nicknamed the "Rouge" (The Red) and the Friday the "Vert" (The Green) in reference to the different color used for the nameplate of the two editions.

In 1998, Midi Olympique launched its website, which was renamed Rugbyrama.fr in 2000 in partnership with Eurosport, and changed the formula of the newspaper under the leadership of its managing editor Jacques Verdier.

In 2005, the newspaper grew to printing 140,000 copies on Monday and 120,000 of the Friday edition for a circulation of around 89,000 copies each issue, steadily increasing around 2% per year since 1999. Special issues are published at the beginning and end of the season to introduce or summarize past or future events. Every first Monday of the month, the newspaper comes with a magazine supplement, Midi Olympique Magazine.

== The Oscars du Midi ==
Since 1954, the newspaper awards the Midi Olympique Oscars annually, rewarding the best players of the month and the year. Since 2003, the awards also reward the three best coaches in the season, and the best player in the world and the best European player. Finally, Midi Olympique awards each month the Oscar for best player of the month from the Top 14 and ProD2 combined.

Argentinian Juan Martín Hernández is the only non-French winner of the overall player award, winning in both 2007 and 2008. New Zealander Byron Kelleher finished second in 2008 and Fijian Napolioni Nalaga tied for third place in 2009 before a rule change was introduced for the 2010 awards which saw foreign players excluded from the main award. Instead, a new category was formed for the best foreign player in the French league.
