= Giuseppe Garibaldi Trophy =

Rugby union trophy contested annually between France and Italy national teams

- Sport: Rugby union
- Instituted: 2007
- Number of teams: 2
- Country: France; Italy
- Holders: France (2026)
- Most titles: France (17 titles)

The Giuseppe Garibaldi Trophy (Italian: Trofeo Garibaldi; French: Trophée Garibaldi) is a rugby union trophy awarded to the winner of the annual Six Nations Championship match between France and Italy.

The trophy, designed by French former international and professional sculptor Jean-Pierre Rives, was awarded for the first time on 3 February 2007 to France as part of the celebrations of the bicentenary of Giuseppe Garibaldi's birth. As of 2026, the trophy has been contested twenty times, with France winning seventeen and Italy two.

== Giuseppe Garibaldi ==
Giuseppe Garibaldi was an Italian revolutionary born in 1807 in Nice (now in France, but then part of the Kingdom of Sardinia). One of the fathers of unified Italy, he was also a general in the French Army during the Franco-Prussian War in 1870.

As part of the celebrations of the bicentenary of Garibaldi's birth it was decided by the Fédération Française de Rugby and the Federazione Italiana Rugby to create a trophy in his honour and have it awarded to the winner of the annual 6 Nations Championship's game between France and Italy.

== Trophy ==
An illustration of the Garibaldi Trophy.

=== Idea ===
The original idea of a trophy to be awarded to the winner of annual game between France and Italy, was first mooted in Nice by the International committee for the celebration of the bicentennial of Garibaldi's birth.

Garibaldi was born in 1807 in Nice, when it was part of the Kingdom of Sardinia/Piedmont, before it was annexed to France in 1860; he fought during the unification of Italy and during the Franco-Prussian War for France. Also from a rugby union point of view historically the sport in Italy has been in the past heavily influenced by the French.

The idea was brought to the attention of both the French and Italian rugby federations, quickly gathered momentum and was approved on 6 December 2006 by the International Rugby Board.

=== Design ===
Designed by former international and full-time sculptor Jean-Pierre Rives, the trophy was unveiled on 2 February 2007, during a ceremony at the French embassy in Rome. The trophy's godfathers were former international players Diego Dominguez for Italy and Jean-François Tordo (who was born in Nice) for France.

== Matches ==
Updated as of 23 February 2026.

Host nation	P	France wins	Italy wins	D	France points	Italy points
France	10	9	0	1	306	146
Italy	10	8	2	0	374	146
Overall	20	17	2	1	680	292

== Results ==
Year	Date	Venue	Home	Score	Away	Match Winner
2007	3 February	Stadio Flaminio, Rome	Italy	3–39	France	France
2008	9 March	Stade de France, Saint-Denis	France	25–13	Italy	France
2009	21 March	Stadio Flaminio, Rome	Italy	8–50	France	France
2010	14 March	Stade de France, Saint-Denis	France	46–20	Italy	France
2011	12 March	Stadio Flaminio, Rome	Italy	22–21	France	Italy
2012	4 February	Stade de France, Saint-Denis	France	30–12	Italy	France
2013	3 February	Stadio Olimpico, Rome	Italy	23–18	France	Italy
2014	9 February	Stade de France, Saint-Denis	France	30–10	Italy	France
2015	15 March	Stadio Olimpico, Rome	Italy	0–29	France	France
2016	6 February	Stade de France, Saint-Denis	France	23–21	Italy	France
2017	11 March	Stadio Olimpico, Rome	Italy	18–40	France	France
2018	23 February	Stade Vélodrome, Marseille	France	34–17	Italy	France
2019	16 March	Stadio Olimpico, Rome	Italy	14–25	France	France
2020	9 February	Stade de France, Saint-Denis	France	35–22	Italy	France
2021	6 February	Stadio Olimpico, Rome	Italy	10–50	France	France
2022	6 February	Stade de France, Saint-Denis	France	37–10	Italy	France
2023	5 February	Stadio Olimpico, Rome	Italy	24–29	France	France
2024	25 February	Stade Pierre-Mauroy, Lille	France	13–13	Italy	draw
2025	23 February	Stadio Olimpico, Rome	Italy	24–73	France	France
2026	23 February	Stade Pierre-Mauroy, Lille	France	33–8	Italy	France

== See also ==
- History of rugby union matches between France and Italy
- France national rugby union team
- Italy national rugby union team
- Millennium Trophy
- Calcutta Cup
- France-Italy relations
- Auld Alliance Trophy
- Centenary Quaich
