= Six Nations Championship =

Annual international rugby union competition

- Current season or competition: 2026 Six Nations Championship
- The Guinness Six Nations logo
- Sport: Rugby union
- Instituted: 1883; 143 years ago (as Home Nations Championship); 1910; 116 years ago (as Five Nations Championship); 2000; 26 years ago (as Six Nations Championship)
- Number of teams: 6
- Country: England; France; Ireland; Italy; Scotland; Wales
- Holders: France (2026)
- Most titles: England; Wales (39 titles)
- Website: sixnationsrugby.com

Six Nations Championship
- Related competitions: Women's; U20s

The Six Nations Championship (known as the Six Nations, branded as Guinness M6N) (Note: For sponsorship reasons.) is an annual international rugby union competition by the men's teams of England, France, Ireland, Italy, Scotland and Wales. It is the oldest sports tournament contested by the Home Nations. The championship holders are France, who won the 2026 tournament.

The tournament is organised by the unions of the six participating nations under the banner of Six Nations Rugby, which is responsible for the promotion and operation of the men's, women's and under-20s tournaments, and the Autumn International Series, as well as the negotiation and management of their centralised commercial rights.

The Six Nations is the successor to the Home Nations Championship (1883–1909 and 1932–39), played by teams from England, Ireland, Scotland, and Wales, which was the first international rugby union tournament. With the addition of France, this became the Five Nations Championship (1910–31 and 1947–99), and the Six Nations Championship with Italy joining in 2000.

England and Wales have won the championship the most times, both with 39 titles, but England have won the most outright titles with 29 (28 for Wales). Since the Six Nations era started in 2000, only Italy and Scotland have failed to win the Six Nations title.

The women's tournament started as the Women's Home Nations in the 1996 season. The men's Six Nations Under 20s Championship is the successor to the Under 21s tournament which began in 2004.

== History and expansion ==
The tournament was first played in 1883 as the Home Nations Championship among the then four Home Nations of the United Kingdom – England, Ireland, Scotland, and Wales. However, England was excluded from the 1888 and 1889 tournaments due to their refusal to join the International Rugby Football Board. The tournament then became the Five Nations Championship in 1910 with the addition of France. The tournament was expanded in 2000 to become the Six Nations Championship with the addition of Italy.

Following the relative success of the Tier 2 nations in the 2015 Rugby World Cup, there were calls by Octavian Morariu, the president of Rugby Europe, to let Georgia and Romania join the Six Nations due to their consistent success in the European Nations Cup and ability to compete in the Rugby World Cup.

From 2024 the series was styled as "M6N" (referring to "Men's 6 Nations"), as a rebranding consistent with the women's competition as "W6N", and the under-20s as "U6N".

== Format ==
The locations of the Six Nations participants

The tournament begins on the first weekend in February and culminates on the second Saturday in March. Each team plays every other team once (a total of 15 matches), with home ground advantage alternating from one year to the next. Before the 2017 tournament, two points were awarded for a win, one for a draw and none for a loss. Unlike many other rugby union competitions, a bonus point system had not previously been used.

A bonus point system was first used in the 2017 Championship. The system is similar to the one used in most rugby championships (0 points for a loss, 2 for a draw, 4 for a win, 1 for scoring four or more tries in a match, and 1 for losing by 7 points or fewer). The only difference is that a team that wins all their games (a Grand Slam) are automatically awarded 3 extra points - to ensure they cannot be overtaken by a defeated team on bonus points.

Before 1994, teams equal on match points shared the championship. Since then, ties have been broken by considering the points difference (total points scored minus total points conceded) of the teams. The rules of the championship further provide that if teams tie on both match points and points difference, the team that scored the most tries wins the championship. Were this decider to be a tie, the tying teams would share the championship. To date, however, match points and points difference have been sufficient to decide the championship.

The Wooden Spoon is a metaphorical award given to the team that finishes in last place; a team which loses all their matches is said to have been "whitewashed". Since the inaugural Six Nations tournament in 2000, only England and Ireland have avoided finishing last. Italy have finished last 18 times in the Six Nations era, and have lost all their matches in 12 tournaments.

Home advantage in the Six Nations
	Three home matches			Two home matches		
Even years	France: v England; v Ireland; v Italy	Ireland: v Italy; v Scotland; v Wales	Wales: v France; v Italy; v Scotland	England: v Ireland; v Wales	Italy: v England; v Scotland	Scotland: v England; v France
Odd years	England: v France; v Italy; v Scotland	Italy: v France; v Ireland; v Wales	Scotland: v Ireland; v Italy; v Wales	France: v Scotland; v Wales	Ireland: v England; v France	Wales: v England; v Ireland

== Trophies ==
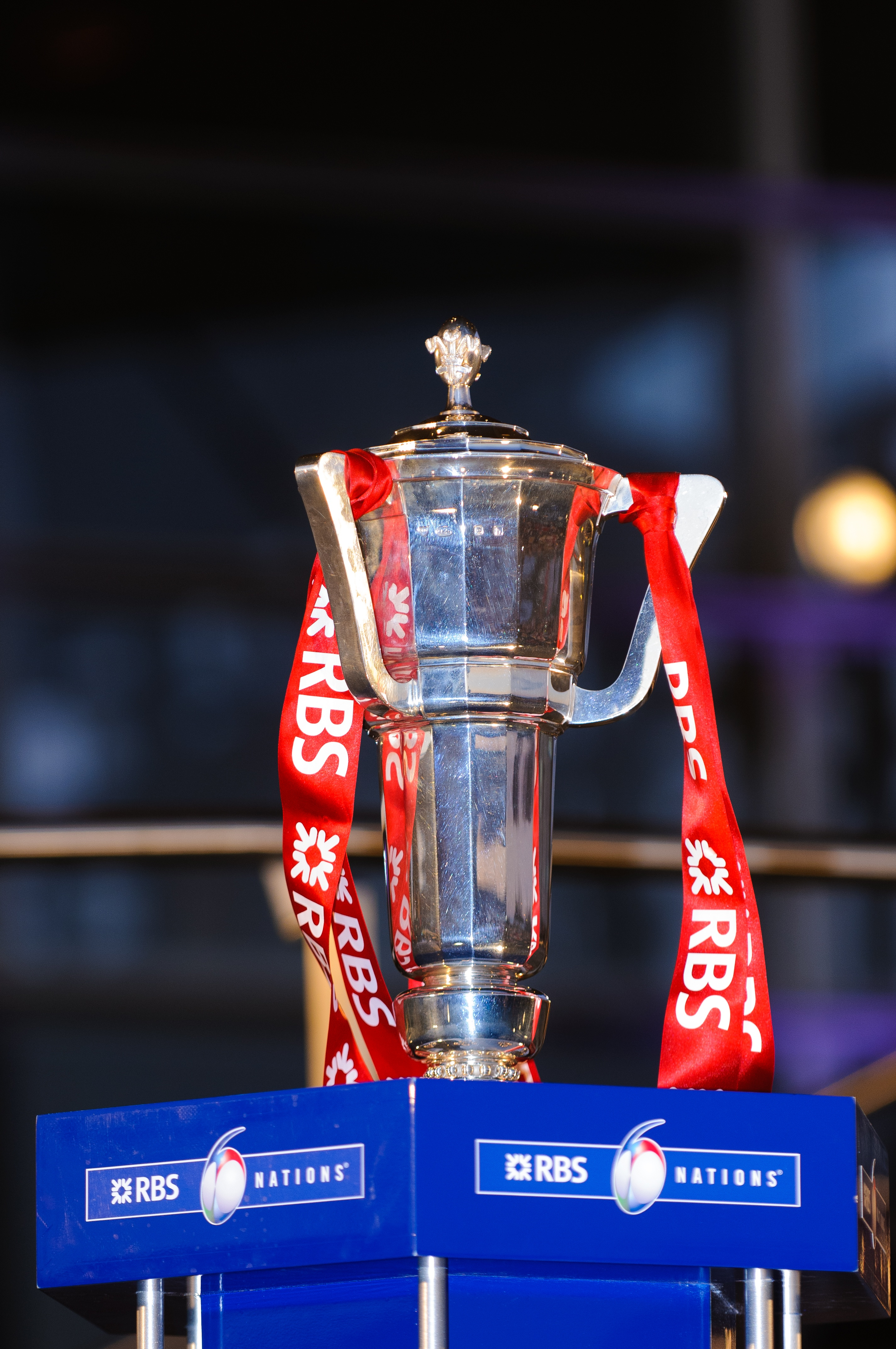
The old Championship trophy in 2012

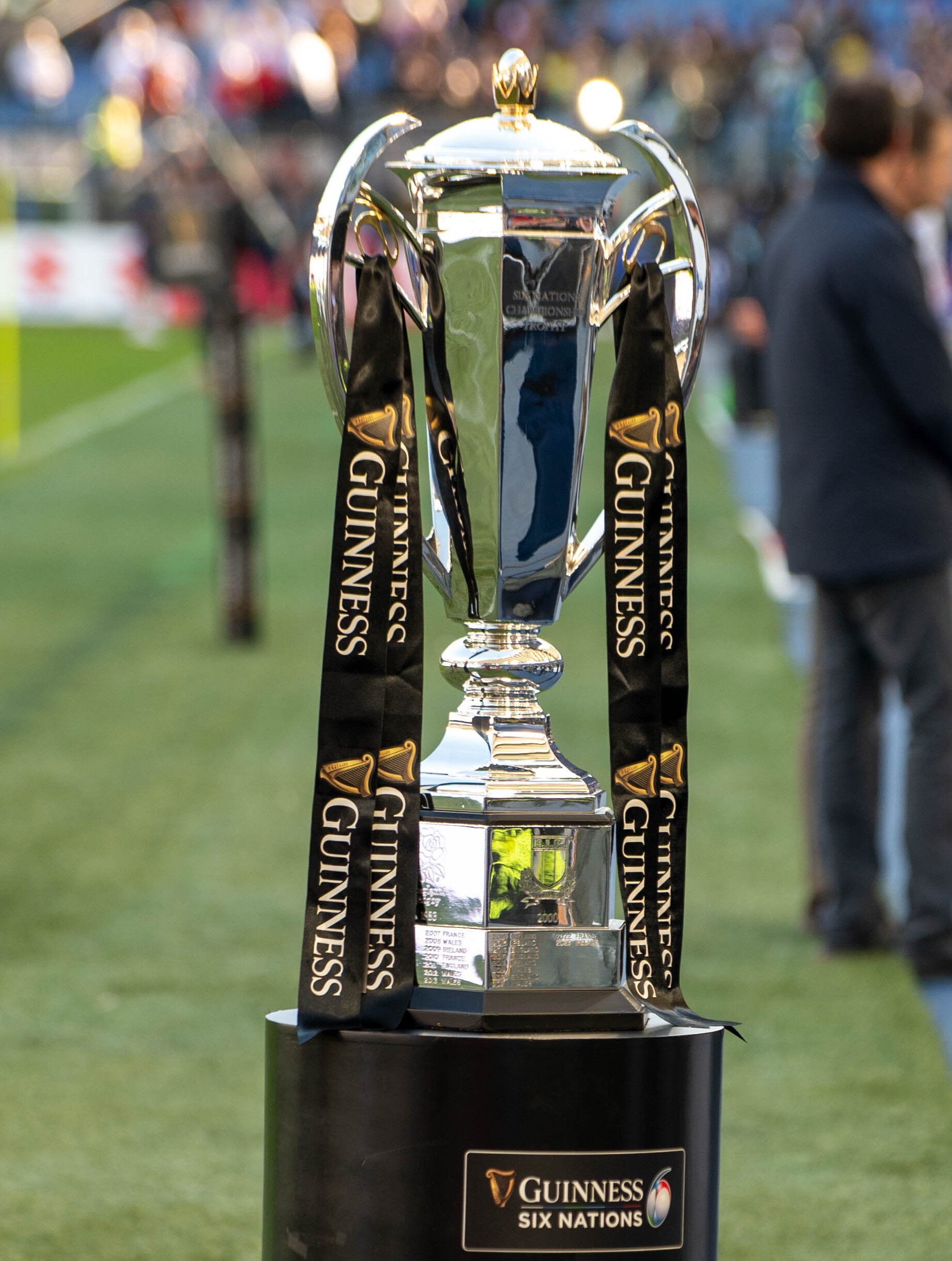
The new Championship trophy in 2024

=== Championship Trophy ===
The winners of the Six Nations are presented with the Championship Trophy. This was originally conceived by the Earl of Westmorland, and was first presented to the winners of the 1993 Five Nations Championship; France. It was a sterling silver trophy, designed by James Brent-Ward and made by a team of eight silversmiths from the London firm William Comyns. The current championship trophy for the Six Nations Championship was designed and made in 2015 by Thomas Lyte, London silversmiths.

The old trophy had 15 side panels representing the 15 members of the team and with three handles to represent the three officials (referee and two touch judges). The cup has a capacity of 3.75 litres (0.8 imp gal; 1.0 US gal) – sufficient for five bottles of champagne. Within the mahogany base is a concealed drawer which contains six alternative finials, each a silver replica of one of the team emblems, which can be screwed on the detachable lid.

A new trophy was introduced for the 2015 Championship. The trophy was sterling silver, containing over fifty individual pieces, standing at a height of 75 cm (30 in) and had a distinctive six-sided design representing the six nations that compete. In 2026, after the third round of the championship, the trophy was damaged by fire and retired from ceremonial use. A replica was presented to the 2026 Six Nations winners, and a new trophy will be commissioned for the 2027 Championship.

=== Grand Slam and Triple Crown ===
A team that wins all its games wins the 'Grand Slam'.

The Triple Crown may only be won by one of the Home Nations of England, Ireland, Scotland or Wales, when one nation wins all three of their matches against the others. The Triple Crown dates back to the original Home Nations Championship, but the physical Triple Crown Trophy has been awarded only since 2006, when the Royal Bank of Scotland (the primary sponsor of the competition) commissioned Hamilton & Inches to design and create a dedicated Triple Crown Trophy. As of 2026, the trophy has been won six times by Ireland, four times by Wales, three times by England, and is yet to be won by Scotland.

=== Rivalry trophies ===
Several individual competitions take place under the umbrella of the tournament. Some of these trophies are also awarded for other matches between the two teams outside the Six Nations. Only Scotland play for a 'rivalry' or challenge trophy in every Six Nations match, as well as for the oldest such trophy, the Calcutta Cup. Wales became the last nation to contest such a trophy, the Doddie Weir Cup in 2018, while the newest such trophy is the Solidarity Trophy introduced between Ireland and France in 2026.

Games which form part of the Triple Crown are marked ^{TC}.

Trophy	Teams	Since	Notes
Calcutta Cup	England–Scotland^{TC}	1879	Made from melted-down Indian rupees donated by the Calcutta Club.
Millennium Trophy	England–Ireland^{TC}	1988	Presented to celebrate Dublin's millennium in 1988.
Centenary Quaich	Ireland–Scotland^{TC}	1989	Named for the quaich, a traditional Gaelic drinking vessel. Marked the centenary of the founding of the International Rugby Football Board.
Giuseppe Garibaldi Trophy	France–Italy	2007	Commemorated the 200th anniversary of the birth of Giuseppe Garibaldi, leader in the unification of Italy and volunteer in the French Republican Army against Prussia.
Auld Alliance Trophy	France–Scotland	2018	In memory of the war dead from the rugby communities of Scotland and France.
Doddie Weir Cup	Wales–Scotland^{TC}	2018	In recognition of Doddie Weir, who founded the My Name's Doddie Foundation which supports research into motor neurone disease.
Cuttitta Cup	Scotland–Italy	2022	Commemorates Massimo Cuttitta, a former Italian captain and Scotland scrum coach, who died in 2021 at the age of 54 from COVID-19.
Solidarity Trophy	Ireland–France	2026	Celebrates historical links between the two nations. Awarded in both the men's and women's editions of the fixture (also known as "Celtic Crunch").

Currently the following matches have no additional trophy contested:

- England–France (a match nicknamed "Le Crunch")
- England–Italy
- England–Wales^{TC}
- France–Wales

- Ireland–Italy
- Ireland–Wales^{TC}
- Italy–Wales

== Venues ==
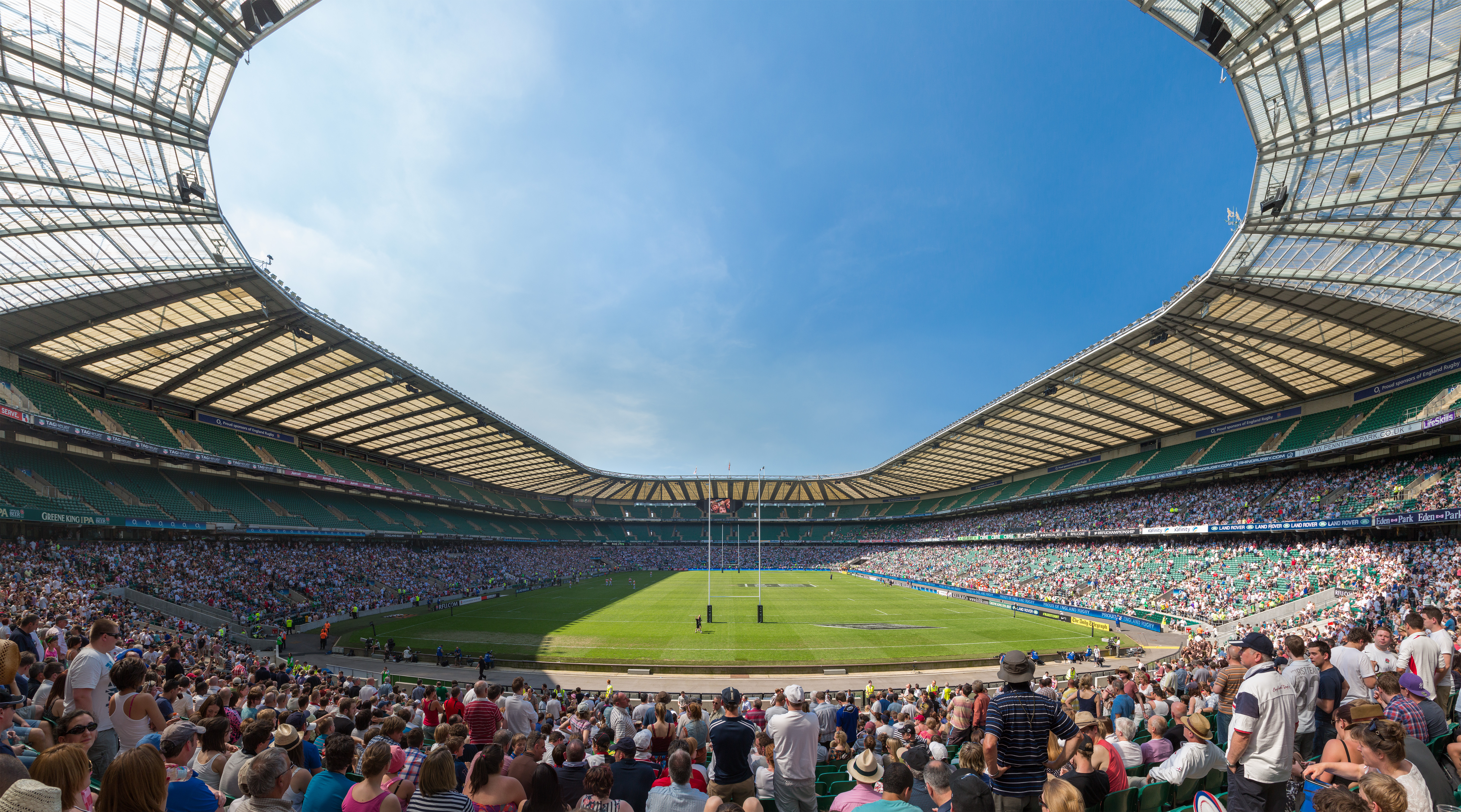
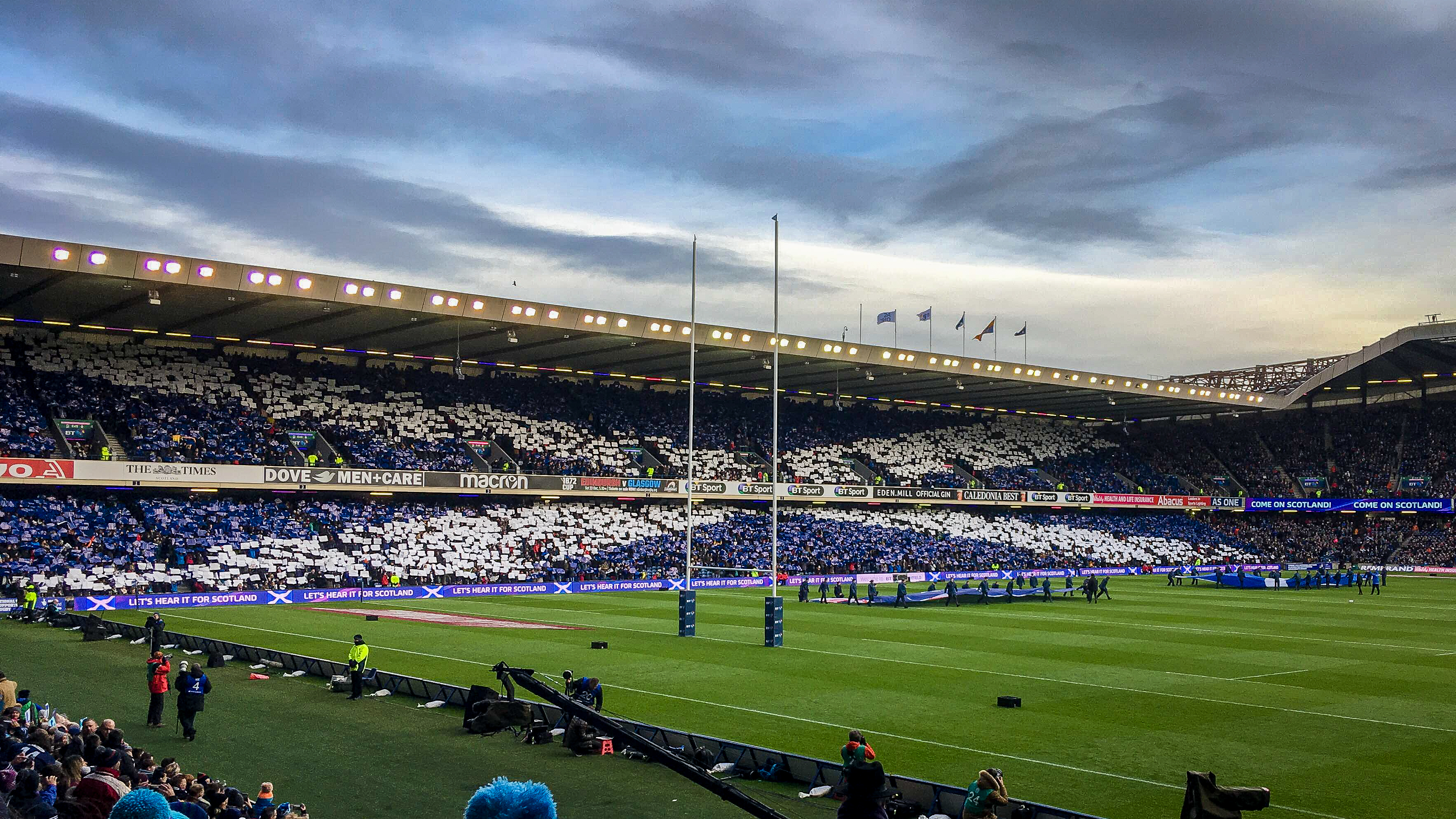
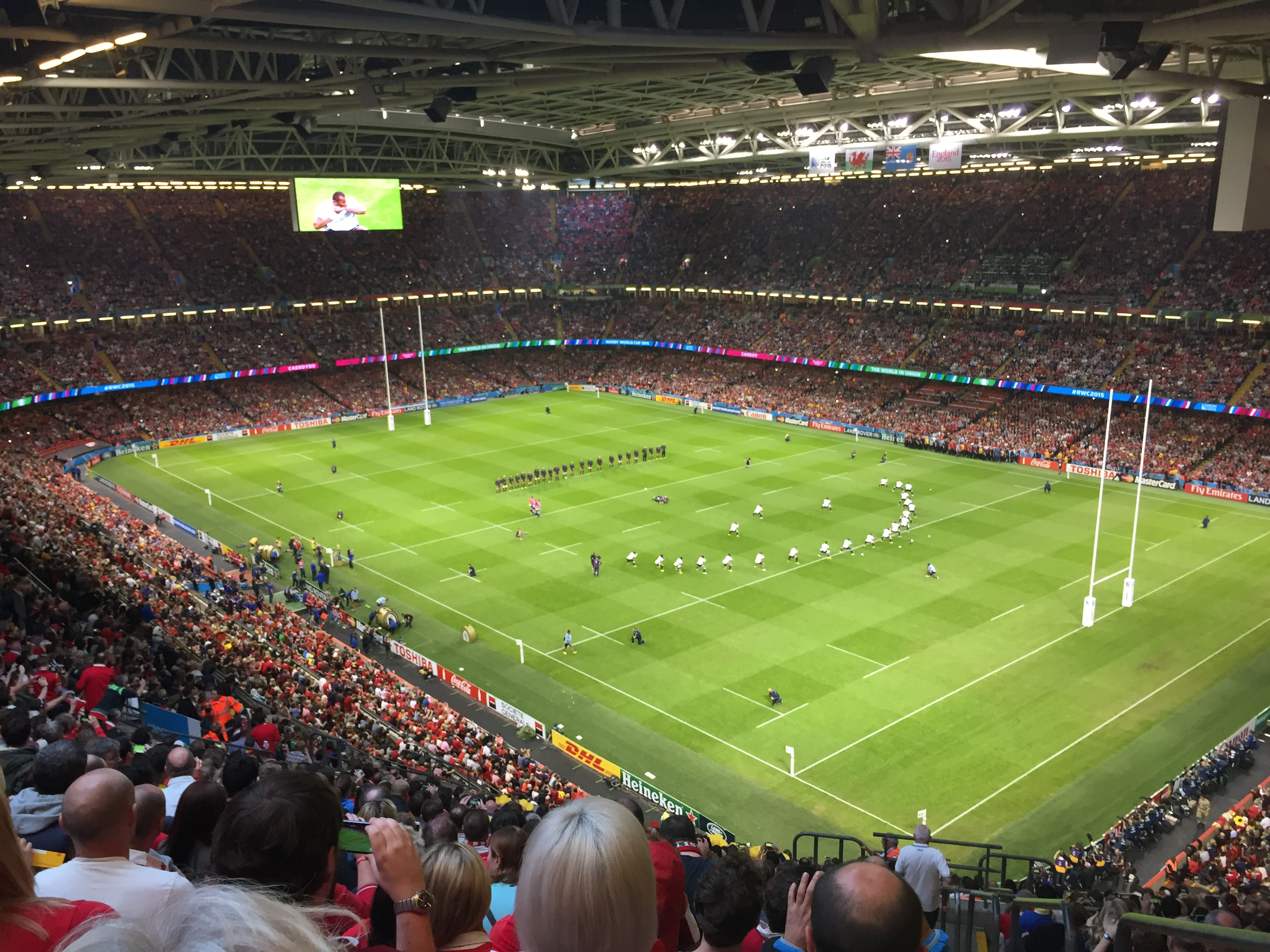
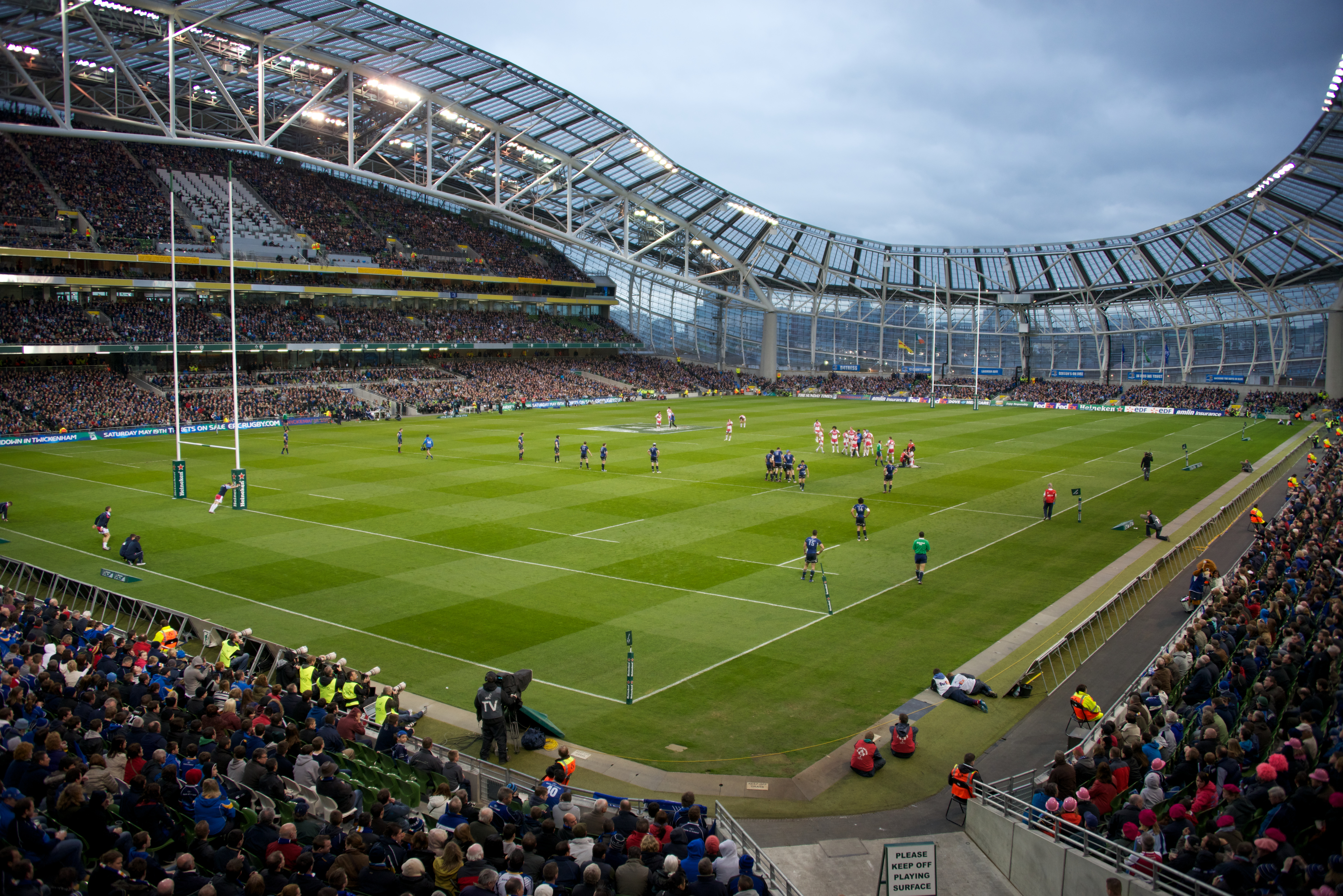
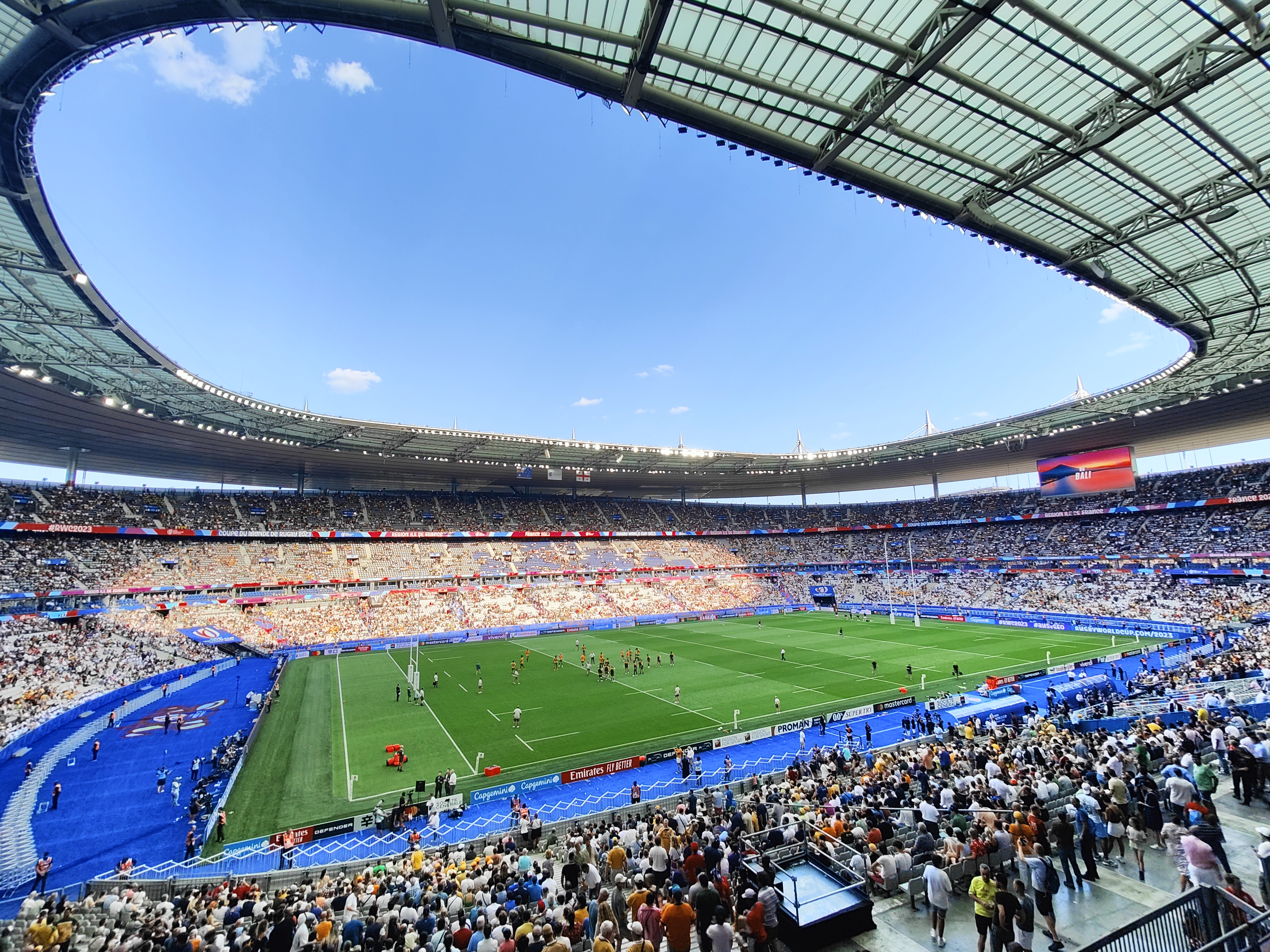
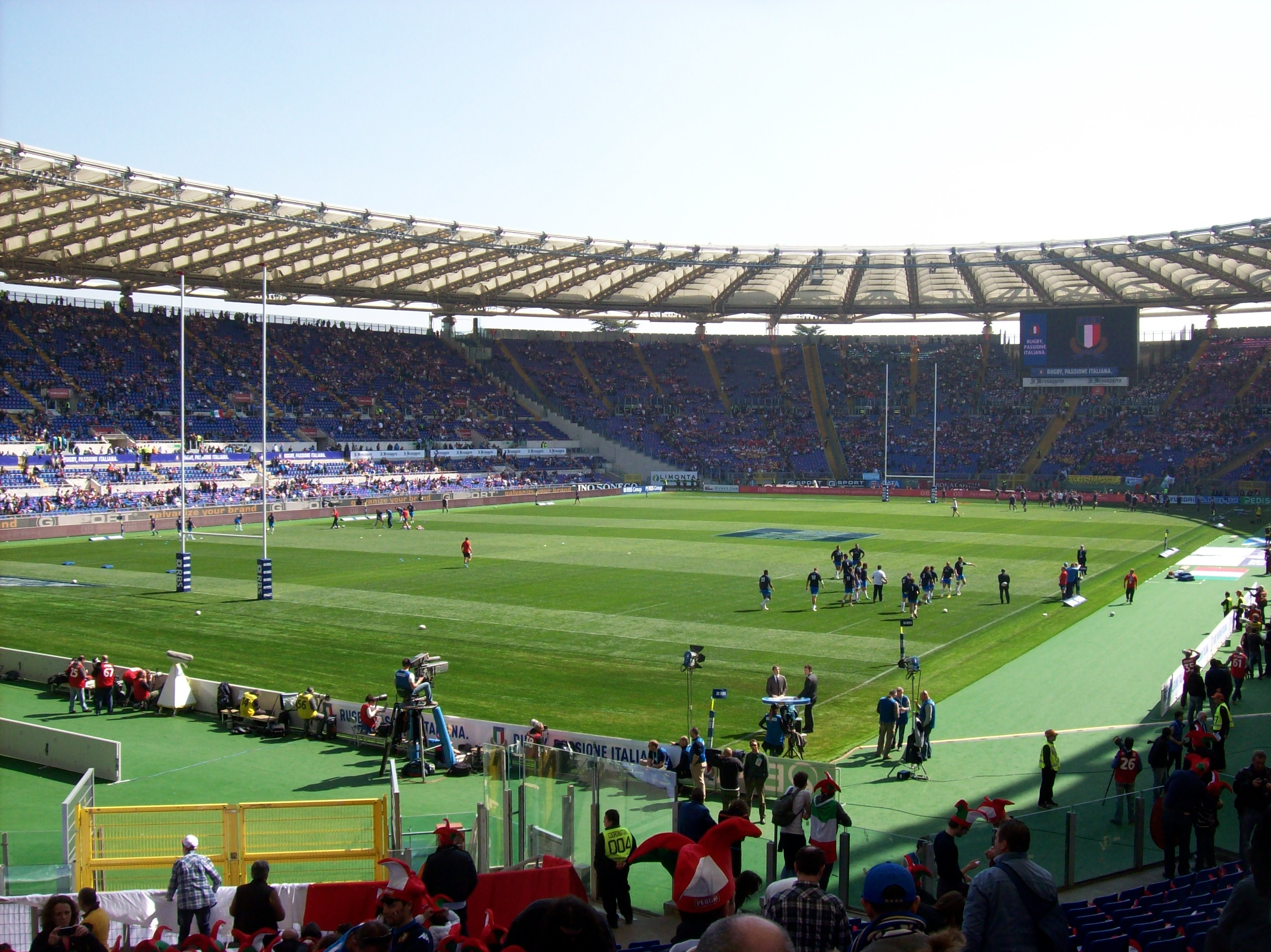
The national rugby union stadiums of the six countries host the events. Top-left to bottom-right: Twickenham Stadium, Murrayfield Stadium, Principality Stadium, Aviva Stadium, Stade de France, Stadio Olimpico

As of the 2026 tournament, Six Nations matches are held in the following stadiums:

Team	Stadium	Location	Capacity
England	Twickenham Stadium	London	82,000
France	Stade de France	Saint-Denis	81,338
Wales	Principality Stadium	Cardiff	73,931
Italy	Stadio Olimpico	Rome	72,698
Scotland	Murrayfield Stadium	Edinburgh	67,144
Ireland	Aviva Stadium	Dublin	51,700

The opening of Aviva Stadium in May 2010 ended the arrangement with the Gaelic Athletic Association (GAA) that allowed the all-Ireland governing body for rugby union, the Irish Rugby Football Union, to use the GAA's flagship stadium, Croke Park, for its international matches. This arrangement was made necessary by the 2007 closure and subsequent demolition of Ireland's traditional home at Lansdowne Road; Aviva Stadium was built on the former Lansdowne Road site. During this construction, Croke Park was the largest of the Six Nations grounds, with a capacity of 82,300.

In 2012, Italy moved their home games from the 32,000 seat Stadio Flaminio, to Stadio Olimpico, also in Rome, with a capacity of 72,000.

The French Rugby Federation (FFR) had planned to build a new stadium of its own, seating 82,000 in the southern suburbs of Paris, because of frustrations with their tenancy of Stade de France. However the project was cancelled in December 2016. France played their 2018 and 2026 matches against Italy at Stade Vélodrome in Marseille and Stade Pierre-Mauroy in Lille respectively.

In 2020, Wales played their final game at Parc y Scarlets in Llanelli due to the Principality Stadium being used as Dragon's Heart Hospital in response to the COVID-19 pandemic.

In 2024, France was unable to use the Stade de France for their Six Nations home games due to ongoing preparations for its use in the 2024 Summer Olympics. Instead they played their three home matches at the Stade Vélodrome, Stade Pierre-Mauroy, and Parc Olympique Lyonnais in Lyon.

== Results ==
=== Overall ===
	England	France	Ireland	Italy	Scotland	Wales
Tournaments	130	97	132	27	132	132
Outright wins (shared wins)
Home Nations	5 (4)	—N/a	4 (3)	—N/a	9 (2)	7 (3)
Five Nations	17 (6)	12 (8)	6 (5)	—N/a	5 (6)	15 (8)
Six Nations	7	8	6	0	0	6
Overall	29 (10)	20 (8)	16 (8)	0 (0)	14 (8)	28 (11)
Grand Slams
Home Nations	—N/a	—N/a	—N/a	—N/a	—N/a	2
Five Nations	11	6	1	—N/a	3	6
Six Nations	2	4	3	0	0	4
Overall	13	10	4	0	3	12
Triple Crowns
Home Nations	5	—N/a	2	—N/a	7	6
Five Nations	16	—N/a	4	—N/a	3	11
Six Nations	5	—N/a	9	—N/a	0	5
Overall	26	—N/a	15	—N/a	10	22
Wooden Spoons
Home Nations	7	—N/a	10	—N/a	5	6
Five Nations	10	12	15	—N/a	15	10
Six Nations	0	1	0	18	4	4
Overall	17	13	25	18	24	20

=== Home Nations (1883–1909) ===
Year	Champions	Grand Slam	Triple Crown	Calcutta Cup
1883	England	Not contested	England	England
1884	England	Not contested	England	England
1885	Not completed (Note: England and Scotland refused to play each other due to a refereeing disagreement in the previous tournament. Wales and Ireland did not play each other due to union disputes.)	Not contested	Not completed	
1886	England and Scotland	Not contested	–	–
1887	Scotland	Not contested	–	–
1888	Not completed (Note: England were excluded from these Championships due to their refusal to join the International Rugby Football Board.)	Not contested	England did not participate	
1889	Not completed	Not contested	England did not participate	
1890	England and Scotland	Not contested	–	England
1891	Scotland	Not contested	Scotland	Scotland
1892	England	Not contested	England	England
1893	Wales	Not contested	Wales	Scotland
1894	Ireland	Not contested	Ireland	Scotland
1895	Scotland	Not contested	Scotland	Scotland
1896	Ireland	Not contested	–	Scotland
1897	Not completed (Note: Wales only played one match before they withdrew from the International Rugby Football Board over the Gould Affair, leaving them ineligible to play their remaining games.)	Not contested	Not completed	England
1898	Not completed (Note: Scotland refused to play Wales due to the Gould Affair.)	Not contested	Not completed	–
1899	Ireland	Not contested	Ireland	Scotland
1900	Wales	Not contested	Wales	–
1901	Scotland	Not contested	Scotland	Scotland
1902	Wales	Not contested	Wales	England
1903	Scotland	Not contested	Scotland	Scotland
1904	Scotland	Not contested	–	Scotland
1905	Wales	Not contested	Wales	Scotland
1906	Ireland and Wales	Not contested	–	England
1907	Scotland	Not contested	Scotland	Scotland
1908	Wales	Wales	Wales	Scotland
1909	Wales	Wales	Wales	Scotland

=== Five Nations (1910–1931) ===
Year	Champions	Grand Slam	Triple Crown	Calcutta Cup
1910	England	–	–	England
1911	Wales	Wales	Wales	England
1912	Ireland and England	–	–	Scotland
1913	England	England	England	England
1914	England	England	England	England
1915–19	Not held due to World War I			
1920	Scotland, Wales and England	–	–	England
1921	England	England	England	England
1922	Wales	–	–	England
1923	England	England	England	England
1924	England	England	England	England
1925	Scotland	Scotland	Scotland	Scotland
1926	Ireland and Scotland	–	–	Scotland
1927	Ireland and Scotland	–	–	Scotland
1928	England	England	England	England
1929	Scotland	–	–	Scotland
1930	England	–	–	–
1931	Wales	–	–	Scotland

=== Home Nations (1932–1939) ===
Year	Champions	Triple Crown	Calcutta Cup
1932	England, Ireland and Wales	–	England
1933	Scotland	Scotland	Scotland
1934	England	England	England
1935	Ireland	–	Scotland
1936	Wales	–	England
1937	England	England	England
1938	Scotland	Scotland	Scotland
1939	England, Ireland, Wales	–	England

=== Five Nations (1940–1999) ===
Year	Champions	Grand Slam	Triple Crown	Calcutta Cup	Millennium Trophy	Centenary Quaich
1940–46	Not held due to World War II					
1947	England and Wales	–	–	England	Not contested	
1948	Ireland	Ireland	Ireland	Scotland	Not contested	
1949	Ireland	–	Ireland	England	Not contested	
1950	Wales	Wales	Wales	Scotland	Not contested	
1951	Ireland	–	–	England	Not contested	
1952	Wales	Wales	Wales	England	Not contested	
1953	England	–	–	England	Not contested	
1954	England, France and Wales	–	England	England	Not contested	
1955	France and Wales	–	–	England	Not contested	
1956	Wales	–	–	England	Not contested	
1957	England	England	England	England	Not contested	
1958	England	–	–	–	Not contested	
1959	France	–	–	–	Not contested	
1960	England and France	–	England	England	Not contested	
1961	France	–	–	England	Not contested	
1962	France	–	–	–	Not contested	
1963	England	–	–	England	Not contested	
1964	Scotland and Wales	–	–	Scotland	Not contested	
1965	Wales	–	Wales	–	Not contested	
1966	Wales	–	–	Scotland	Not contested	
1967	France	–	–	England	Not contested	
1968	France	France	–	England	Not contested	
1969	Wales	–	Wales	England	Not contested	
1970	France and Wales	–	–	Scotland	Not contested	
1971	Wales	Wales	Wales	Scotland	Not contested	
1972	Not completed (Note: Scotland and Wales refused to play Ireland in Dublin due to security concerns in the aftermath of Bloody Sunday.)			Scotland	Not contested	
1973	England, France, Ireland, Scotland, Wales	–	–	England	Not contested	
1974	Ireland	–	–	Scotland	Not contested	
1975	Wales	–	–	England	Not contested	
1976	Wales	Wales	Wales	Scotland	Not contested	
1977	France	France	Wales	England	Not contested	
1978	Wales	Wales	Wales	England	Not contested	
1979	Wales	–	Wales	–	Not contested	
1980	England	England	England	England	Not contested	
1981	France	France	–	England	Not contested	
1982	Ireland	–	Ireland	–	Not contested	
1983	France and Ireland	–	–	Scotland	Not contested	
1984	Scotland	Scotland	Scotland	Scotland	Not contested	
1985	Ireland	–	Ireland	England	Not contested	
1986	France and Scotland	–	–	Scotland	Not contested	
1987	France	France	–	England	Not contested	
1988	France and Wales	–	Wales	England	Not contested	
1989	France	–	–	–	England	Scotland
1990	Scotland	Scotland	Scotland	Scotland	England	Scotland
1991	England	England	England	England	England	Scotland
1992	England	England	England	England	England	Scotland
1993	France	–	–	England	Ireland	Scotland
1994	Wales	–	–	England	Ireland	–
1995	England	England	England	England	England	Scotland
1996	England	–	England	England	England	Scotland
1997	France	France	England	England	England	Scotland
1998	France	France	England	England	England	Scotland
1999	Scotland	–	–	England	England	Scotland

=== Six Nations (2000–present) ===
Year	Champions	Grand Slam	Triple Crown	Calcutta Cup	Millennium Trophy	Centenary Quaich	Giuseppe Garibaldi Trophy	Auld Alliance Trophy	Doddie Weir Cup	Cuttitta Cup	Solidarity Trophy	Wooden spoon
2000	England (1)	–	–	Scotland	England	Ireland	Not contested	Not contested	Not contested	Not contested	Not contested	Italy
2001	England (2)	–	–	England	Ireland	Scotland	Not contested	Not contested	Not contested	Not contested	Not contested	Italy
2002	France (1)	France	England	England	England	Ireland	Not contested	Not contested	Not contested	Not contested	Not contested	Italy
2003	England (3)	England	England	England	England	Ireland	Not contested	Not contested	Not contested	Not contested	Not contested	Wales
2004	France (2)	France	Ireland	England	Ireland	Ireland	Not contested	Not contested	Not contested	Not contested	Not contested	Scotland
2005	Wales (1)	Wales	Wales	England	Ireland	Ireland	Not contested	Not contested	Not contested	Not contested	Not contested	Italy
2006	France (3)	–	Ireland	Scotland	Ireland	Ireland	Not contested	Not contested	Not contested	Not contested	Not contested	Italy
2007	France (4)	–	Ireland	England	Ireland	Ireland	France	Not contested	Not contested	Not contested	Not contested	Scotland
2008	Wales (2)	Wales	Wales	Scotland	England	Ireland	France	Not contested	Not contested	Not contested	Not contested	Italy
2009	Ireland (1)	Ireland	Ireland	England	Ireland	Ireland	France	Not contested	Not contested	Not contested	Not contested	Italy
2010	France (5)	France	–	–	Ireland	Scotland	France	Not contested	Not contested	Not contested	Not contested	Italy
2011	England (4)	–	–	England	Ireland	Ireland	Italy	Not contested	Not contested	Not contested	Not contested	Italy
2012	Wales (3)	Wales	Wales	England	England	Ireland	France	Not contested	Not contested	Not contested	Not contested	Scotland
2013	Wales (4)	–	–	England	England	Scotland	Italy	Not contested	Not contested	Not contested	Not contested	France
2014	Ireland (2)	–	England	England	England	Ireland	France	Not contested	Not contested	Not contested	Not contested	Italy
2015	Ireland (3)	–	–	England	Ireland	Ireland	France	Not contested	Not contested	Not contested	Not contested	Scotland
2016	England (5)	England	England	England	England	Ireland	France	Not contested	Not contested	Not contested	Not contested	Italy
2017	England (6)	–	–	England	Ireland	Scotland	France	Not contested	Not contested	Not contested	Not contested	Italy
2018	Ireland (4)	Ireland	Ireland	Scotland	Ireland	Ireland	France	Scotland	Not contested	Not contested	Not contested	Italy
2019	Wales (5)	Wales	Wales	–	England	Ireland	France	France	Wales	Not contested	Not contested	Italy
2020	England (7)	–	England	England	England	Ireland	France	Scotland	Scotland	Not contested	Not contested	Italy
2021	Wales (6)	–	Wales	Scotland	Ireland	Ireland	France	Scotland	Wales	Not contested	Not contested	Italy
2022	France (6)	France	Ireland	Scotland	Ireland	Ireland	France	France	Wales	Scotland	Not contested	Italy
2023	Ireland (5)	Ireland	Ireland	Scotland	Ireland	Ireland	France	France	Scotland	Scotland	Not contested	Italy
2024	Ireland (6)	–	–	Scotland	England	Ireland	–	France	Scotland	Italy	Not contested	Wales
2025	France (7)	–	Ireland	England	Ireland	Ireland	France	France	Scotland	Scotland	Not contested	Wales
2026	France (8)	–	Ireland	Scotland	Ireland	Ireland	France	Scotland	Scotland	Italy	France	Wales

== Titles and match records ==
Titles, Grand Slams and Triple Crowns (All Time)
Nation	Titles	Last Title	Grand Slams	Last Grand Slam	Triple Crowns	Last Triple Crown
England	39	2020	13	2016	26	2020
Wales	39	2021	12	2019	22	2021
France	28	2026	10	2022	—N/a	—N/a
Ireland	24	2024	4	2023	15	2026
Scotland	22	1999	3	1990	10	1990
Italy	0	—	0	—	—N/a	—N/a

Titles, Grand Slams and Triple Crowns (Six Nations era only: 2000-present)
Nation	Titles	Last Title	Grand Slams	Last Grand Slam	Triple Crowns	Last Triple Crown
France	8	2026	4	2022	—N/a	—N/a
England	7	2020	2	2016	5	2020
Wales	6	2021	4	2019	5	2021
Ireland	6	2024	3	2023	9	2026
Scotland	0	—	0	—	0	—
Italy	0	—	0	—	—N/a	—N/a

Match records (Six Nations era 2000–2026)

Team	Played	Wins	Losses	Draws	Win %	Loss %
Ireland	135	**93**	39	**3**	**68.89%**	28.89%
France	135	88	44	**3**	65.19%	32.59%
England	135	87	46	2	64.44%	34.07%
Wales	135	65	67	**3**	48.15%	49.63%
Scotland	135	46	86	**3**	34.07%	63.7%
Italy	135	18	**115**	2	13.33%	**85.19%**

Head-to-head records (Five Nations Championship era)

Record Team	England	France	Ireland	Scotland	Wales	Total record
England	—N/a	35–7–27	38–7–23	43–8–19	30–8–32	146–30–101 (52.71%)
France	27–7–35	—N/a	42–5–23	34–2–33	30–3–37	133–17–128 (47.84%)
Ireland	23–7–38	23–5–42	—N/a	34–2–33	25–5–38	105–19–151 (38.18%)
Scotland	19–8–43	33–2–34	33–2–34	—N/a	29–1–40	114–13–151 (41.01%)
Wales	32–8–30	37–3–30	38–5–25	40–1–29	—N/a	147–17–114 (52.88%)

Head-to-head records (Six Nations Championship era) (2000-2026)

	England	France	Ireland	Italy	Scotland	Wales	Total Record
England	—	15–0–12	11–0–16	26–0–1	16–2–9	19–0–8	87–2–46 (66.2%)
France	12–0–15	—	14–2–11	24–1–2	21–0–6	17–0–10	88–3–44 (64.6%)
Ireland	16–0–11	11–2–14	—	26–0–1	23–0–4	17–1–9	93–3–39 (68.5%)
Italy	1–0–26	2–1–24	1–0–26	—	9–0–18	5–1–21	18–2–115 (13.3%)
Scotland	9–2–16	6–0–21	4–0–23	18–0–9	—	9–1–17	46–3–86 (33.1%)
Wales	8–0–19	10–0–17	9–1–17	21–1–5	17–1–9	—	65–3–67 (49.2%)

"Wooden Spoon": Overall

Team	Wooden Spoons	HNC	FNC	SNC	Last
Ireland	25	11	14	0	1998
Scotland	24	5	15	4	2015
Wales	20	6	10	4	2026
Italy	18	—N/a	—N/a	18	2023
England	17	7	10	0	1987
France	13	—N/a	12	1	2013

"Wooden Spoon": Six Nations era (2000–2026)

Team	Wooden Spoons	Years
Italy	18	2000, **2001**, **2002**, **2005**, **2006**, 2008, **2009**, 2010, 2011, **2014**, **2016**, **2017**, **2018**, **2019**, **2020**, **2021**, 2022, **2023**
Scotland	4	**2004**, 2007, **2012**, **2015**
Wales	4	**2003**, **2024, 2025**, 2026
France	1	2013
England	0	-
Ireland	0	-

Years marked in bold indicates that the team did not win any matches, a situation sometimes referred to as a 'whitewash'. Prior to the introduction of bonus points in 2017 a whitewash would by definition also be a Wooden Spoon; since 2017 it is theoretically possible for a team which loses all its games to finish the tournament ahead of team(s) which win one or even two games, though this has yet to happen in practice.

=== Player awards ===
Player of the championship
Year	Winner
2004	(Ireland) Gordon D'Arcy
2005	(Wales) Martyn Williams
2006	(Ireland) Brian O'Driscoll
2007	(Ireland) Brian O'Driscoll (2)
2008	(Wales) Shane Williams
2009	(Ireland) Brian O'Driscoll (3)
2010	(Ireland) Tommy Bowe
2011	(Italy) Andrea Masi
2012	(Wales) Dan Lydiate
2013	(Wales) Leigh Halfpenny
2014	(England) Mike Brown
2015	(Ireland) Paul O'Connell
2016	(Scotland) Stuart Hogg
2017	(Scotland) Stuart Hogg (2)
2018	(Ireland) Jacob Stockdale
2019	(Wales) Alun Wyn Jones
2020	(France) Antoine Dupont
2021	(Scotland) Hamish Watson
2022	(France) Antoine Dupont (2)
2023	(France) Antoine Dupont (3)
2024	(Italy) Tommaso Menoncello
2025	(France) Louis Bielle-Biarrey
2026	(France) Louis Bielle-Biarrey (2)

== Records ==
Ireland's Johnny Sexton holds the record for most points in the competition, with 566. England's Jonny Wilkinson holds the records for individual points in one match (35 points against Italy in 2001) and one season with 89 (scored in 2001). Wales’s Dan Biggar holds the record for highest successful kick percentage at 85% (minimum of 50 kicks attempted).

The record for tries in a match is held by George Campbell Lindsay, who scored five tries for Scotland against Wales in 1887.France's Louis Bielle-Biarrey holds the record for tries in one tournament with 9 in 2026. Ireland's Brian O'Driscoll has the Championship record for tries with 26.

The record for appearances is held by Sergio Parisse of Italy, with 69 appearances, between 2004 and 2019.

The most points scored by a team in one match was 80 points, scored by England against Italy in 2001. England also scored the most points in a season in 2001 with 229. France scored the most tries in a season, with 30 both in 2025 and 2026. Wales hold the record for fewest tries conceded during a season in the Six Nations era, conceding only 2 in 5 games in 2008, but the 1977 Grand Slam-winning France team did not concede a try in their four matches. Wales hold the record for the longest time without conceding a try, at 358 minutes in the 2013 tournament.

== Administration ==
The Championship is run from headquarters in Dublin, Ireland by Six Nations Rugby Ltd.

Former England and Wales Cricket Board (ECB) CEO, Tom Harrison, was appointed the CEO of Six Nations Rugby in January 2023 following the resignation of Benjamin Morel in November 2022. Morel had held the position of CEO since November 2018, replacing John Feehan, who stepped down after sixteen years as CEO in April 2018. Harrison's tenure as CEO commenced from April 2023.

Ronan Dunne was appointed as the Chairman for Six Nations Rugby in November 2021 with his tenure commencing from January 2022. Dunne has responsibility for the commercial and marketing operations for both the men's and women's Six Nations tournaments.

== Marketing ==
=== Broadcasting rights ===
One of the most important rugby union tournaments in the world, the Six Nations Championship is broadcast in various countries in addition to the six participating nations.

In the United Kingdom, the BBC has long covered the tournament, broadcasting all matches (apart from England home matches between 1997 and 2002, which were shown live by Sky Sports with highlights on the BBC) until 2015. In addition, Welsh language coverage of broadcasts matches featuring the Welsh team shown by the BBC are shown on S4C in Wales in the United Kingdom. Between 2003 and 2015, the BBC covered every match live on BBC Sport either on BBC One or BBC Two with highlights also on the BBC Sport website and either on the BBC Red Button or late at night on BBC Two.

On 9 July 2015, in reaction to bids by Sky for the rights beginning in 2018, the BBC ended its contract two seasons early, and renegotiated a joint contract with ITV Sport for rights to the Six Nations from 2016 to 2021. ITV acquired rights to England, Ireland and Italy home matches, while the BBC retained rights to France, Scotland and Wales home matches. By ending its contract early, the BBC saved around £30 million, while the new contract generated £20 million in additional revenue for the Six Nations.

With the end of the contract nearing, speculation once again emerged in 2020 that Sky was pursuing rights to the Six Nations from 2022 onward; under the Ofcom "listed events" rules, rights to the tournament can be held by a pay television channel if delayed broadcasts or highlights are made available on free-to-air television. It was reported that the bid for CVC Equity Partners to purchase a stake in the Six Nations was being hindered by a desire for a more lucrative broadcast contract; a call for the Six Nations to be moved to Category A (which requires live coverage to air free-to-air) was rejected. In May 2021, the BBC and ITV renewed their contracts through 2025. The BBC continued to broadcast home matches from Scotland and Wales and all women's and under-20s matches, with ITV airing England, France, Ireland and Italy home matches. This new deal would see the BBC retain 5 live matches with ITV showing the other 10. In 2025, the deal was further extended until the 2029 tournament in a deal which would see BBC retain 5 matches (all featuring Scotland or Wales) and ITV retain 10 matches whilst also gaining exclusivity of all matches featuring England.

France, Ireland, and Italy listed the Six Nations as a major event with cultural significance and enacted national and EU laws to ensure coverage would be available on free-to-air channels.

In Ireland, each of Ireland's games in the Six Nations may be held by a pay television channel, if the match is delayed broadcast and in full on free-to-air television. RTÉ have broadcast the championship since RTÉ's inception and continued to do so until 2017, while TG4 televised highlights. However, in late 2015 RTÉ's free-to-air rival TV3 was awarded the rights for every game from the Six Nations on Irish television from 2018 to 2021. In 2022, it was announced that RTÉ and Virgin Media would share broadcasting rights.

In France, the entire Six Nations rugby tournament must appear on free-to-air television. France Télévisions has covered the competition in France.

In Italy, Six Nations rugby matches involving the Italian national team must be broadcast on free-to-air television. Sky Italia broadcasts all matches while free-to-air TV8 only covers Italy fixtures.

In the United States, NBC Sports broadcasts matches in English. The tournament is also broadcast on DAZN in Canada, Premier Sports Asia in East and Southeast Asia, Sky Sport in New Zealand, Stan Sport in Australia and SuperSport in South Africa.

In 2024, the Six Nations teams featured in a Netflix documentary Six Nations: Full Contact. In February 2024, the show was green lit for a second season. In January 2025, the tournament organisers confirmed that Netflix would not be taking up the option to produce a third series.

Territory	Broadcaster	Summary
France	France 2	All matches
Republic of Ireland	RTÉ	All matches split between both channels
Republic of Ireland	Virgin Media Television	All matches split between both channels
Italy	Sky	All matches
Italy	TV8	Italy matches only
United Kingdom	BBC One	5 matches all featuring Scotland or Wales
United Kingdom	ITV	10 matches including exclusivity of matches featuring England
United Kingdom	S4C	Wales matches shown by BBC in the Welsh language
Asia	Premier Sports Asia	All matches
Australia	Stan Sport	All matches
Baltic states and Nordic countries (including Poland)	Viaplay	All matches
Canada	DAZN	All matches
Caribbean	ESPN	All matches
Czechia (including Slovakia)	Nova Sport	All matches
Germanic Europe (including Luxembourg)	More Than Sports	All matches
Israel	Sport 5	All matches
Georgia	Rugby TV	All matches
Japan	Wowow	All matches
Malta	GO	All matches
MENA	Premier Sports Middle East	All matches
Netherlands	Ziggo Sport	All matches
New Zealand	Sky Sport	All matches
Portugal (including Slovenia)	Sport TV	All matches
Romania	Digi Sport	All matches
Spain (including Andorra)	Movistar Plus+	All matches
South America (including Argentina and Brazil)	ESPN Latin America	All matches shown in the Spanish language
South America (including Argentina and Brazil)	ESPN Brazil	All matches shown in the Portuguese language
Sub-Saharan Africa (including South Africa)	SuperSport	All matches
United States	NBC Sports	All matches
Worldwide	TV5Monde	France matches only

=== Sponsorship ===
Until 1998, the competition had no title sponsor. Sponsorship rights were sold to Lloyds TSB Group for the 1999 tournament and the competition was titled the Lloyds TSB 5 Nations and Lloyds TSB 6 Nations until 2002.

The Royal Bank of Scotland Group took over sponsorship from 2003 until 2017, with the competition being branded the RBS 6 Nations. A new title sponsor was sought for the 2018 tournament and beyond. However, after struggling to find a new sponsor, organisers agreed a one-year extension at a reduced rate. As the RBS brand was being phased out, the tournament was named after the NatWest banking subsidiary, becoming the NatWest 6 Nations.

On 7 December 2018, Guinness was announced as the Championship's new title sponsor, with the competition to be named the Guinness Six Nations from 2019 to 2024. Due to the Loi Évin laws which prohibit alcohol sponsorship in sport, "Guinness" cannot be used as part of the branding of the tournament in France. The French-language logo for the tournament replaces the Guinness logo with the word "Greatness" in the same colour and typeface as the Guinness wordmark.

== See also ==
- The Rugby Championship, an analogous tournament of national teams in the Southern Hemisphere
- Rugby Europe International Championships, for second- and third-tier national teams in Europe
- Six Nations Under 20s Championship
- Women's Six Nations Championship
- British Home Championship, a similar tournament in association football

== Sources ==
- Godwin, Terry (1984). The International Rugby Championship 1883–1983. London: Willows Books. ISBN 978-0-00-218060-3.
- Narz, Naomi, ed. (2019). Rugby: Wales and United States Connection, a Showing of LDR Feats in Sport Feats in Sport. Rich Books.
- Starmer-Smith, Nigel, ed. (1986). Rugby – A Way of Life: An Illustrated History of Rugby. Lennard Books. ISBN 978-0-7126-2662-0.
