= Doddie Weir Cup =

Six nations championship annual rugby game

- Sport: Rugby union
- Instituted: 2018
- Number of teams: 2
- Country: Scotland; Wales
- Holders: Scotland (2026)
- Most titles: Scotland (5 titles)

The Doddie Weir Cup (Welsh: Cwpan Doddie Weir) is a perpetual rugby union trophy established in 2018 and contested between Scotland and Wales. The cup is named after the former Scotland international lock Doddie Weir who was diagnosed with motor neuron disease in 2016 (he died from the disease in 2022, aged 52), and was created to raise awareness of the illness.

Wales won 21–10 in the inaugural match in Cardiff in November 2018. Scotland are the current holders.

== Design ==
The cup was commissioned jointly by the Welsh Rugby Union and the Scottish Rugby Union and was designed by the Edinburgh silversmiths Hamilton and Inches. Doddie Weir commented on the trophy design, stating that the silversmiths "have done an absolutely fantastic job in making it with some big handles to emulate my massive ears!"

== Charity ==
Weir set up a charity called My Name's Doddie Foundation to help fund treatments for motor neurone disease.

Neither the Welsh Rugby Union nor the Scottish Rugby Union originally intended to contribute any of the gate receipts from the inaugural match to the charity, but pressure from fans and in the media resulted in them eventually donating a six-figure sum.

== Summary ==
Details	Played	Won by Scotland	Won by Wales	Drawn	Scotland points	Wales points
In Scotland	4	2	2	0	105	79
In Wales	5	3	2	0	94	100
Overall	9	5	4	0	199	179

== Results ==
- 6N – Six Nations Championship
- AI – Autumn International

Year	Date	Venue	Home	Score	Away	Winner
2018	3 November	Millennium Stadium, Cardiff	Wales	21–10	Scotland	Wales
2019	9 March	Murrayfield Stadium, Edinburgh	Scotland	11–18	Wales	Wales
2020	31 October	Parc y Scarlets, Llanelli	Wales	10–14	Scotland	Scotland
2021	13 February	Murrayfield Stadium, Edinburgh	Scotland	24–25	Wales	Wales
2022	12 February	Millennium Stadium, Cardiff	Wales	20–17	Scotland	Wales
2023	11 February	Murrayfield Stadium, Edinburgh	Scotland	35–7	Wales	Scotland
2024	3 February	Millennium Stadium, Cardiff	Wales	26–27	Scotland	Scotland
2025	8 March	Murrayfield Stadium, Edinburgh	Scotland	35–29	Wales	Scotland
2026	21 February	Millennium Stadium, Cardiff	Wales	23–26	Scotland	Scotland

== See also ==
- History of rugby union matches between Scotland and Wales
