= Auld Alliance Trophy =

Annual trophy contested between France and Scotland since 2018

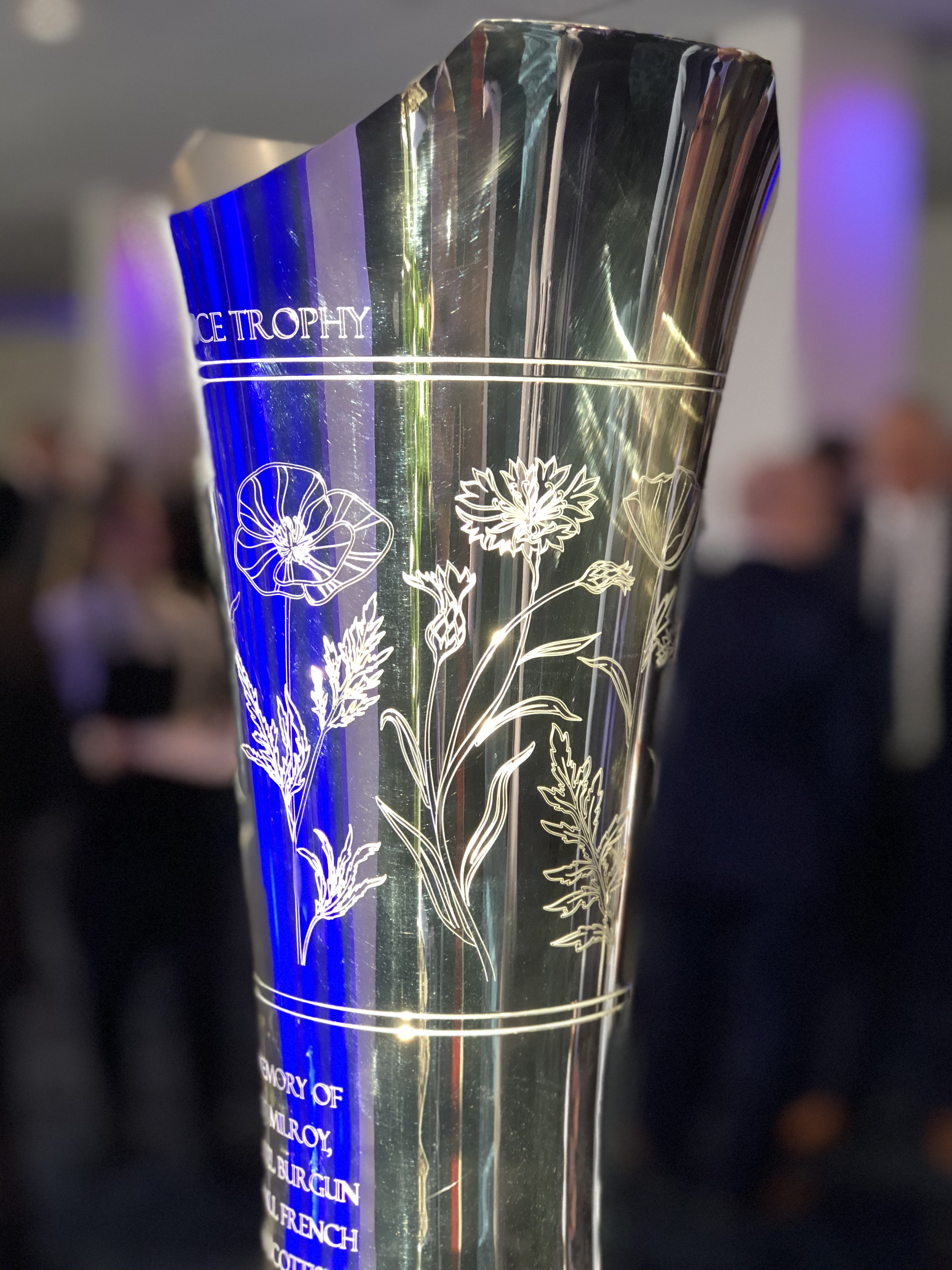
- Sport: Rugby union
- Instituted: 2018; 8 years ago
- Number of teams: 2
- Country: France; Scotland
- Holders: Scotland (2026)
- Most titles: France (5 titles)

The Auld Alliance Trophy is a trophy in rugby union awarded to the winner of the annual Six Nations Championship match between France and Scotland.

The Trophy was first awarded in 2018, the centenary of the end of World War I, to commemorate the French and Scottish rugby players who were killed during the conflict, in particular the captains of the two nations in the last matches played before the First World War – Eric Milroy (Scotland) and Marcel Burgun (France). The Trophy was carried on to the pitch at Murrayfield before the Six Nations match by Lachlan Ross and Romain Cabanis, 11-year-old descendants of the Milroy and Burgun families. In all, 30 Scottish and 22 French internationals were killed in the war.

Manufactured from solid silver by Thomas Lyte & Co. and featuring a design of poppies and cornflowers for remembrance, the Trophy was promoted to the Scottish Rugby Union and the Fédération française de rugby by Patrick Caublot of Amiens Rugby Club and by David Anderson, Milroy's great-great-nephew.

The Trophy is inscribed, in English and French, with the words: "In memory of Eric Milroy, Marcel Burgun and all the French and Scottish rugby players who fell during World War I". In October 2022, a descendant of Eric Milroy was identified in Ollie Smith, a player for the Glasgow Warriors and the Scottish national team.

The name of the trophy is a reference to the 13th century Auld Alliance between France and Scotland.

Overall, as of 2024 there have been 103 matches between the two countries. There have been three Rugby World Cup meetings, each time in the initial pool stage, with the first fixture ending in a draw (20–20 in 1987) and France winning both of the others (22–19 in 1995, and 51–9 in 2003). In addition, the teams played two 'warm-up' test matches in preparation for the 2023 Rugby World Cup.

== Matches ==
Host nation	Played	France wins	Scotland wins	Drawn	France points	Scotland points
France	4	3	1	0	117	74
Scotland	4	2	2	0	99	93
Overall	8	5	3	0	216	167

== Results ==
Year	Date	Venue	Home	Score	Away	Trophy Winner
2018	11 February	Murrayfield, Edinburgh	Scotland	32–26	France	(Scotland)
2019	23 February	Stade de France, Saint-Denis	France	27–10	Scotland	(France)
2020	8 March	Murrayfield, Edinburgh	Scotland	28–17	France	(Scotland)
2021	26 March	Stade de France, Saint-Denis	France	23–27	Scotland	(Scotland)
2022	26 February	Murrayfield, Edinburgh	Scotland	17–36	France	(France)
2023	26 February	Stade de France, Saint-Denis	France	32–21	Scotland	(France)
2024	10 February	Murrayfield, Edinburgh	Scotland	16–20	France	(France)
2025	15 March	Stade de France, Saint-Denis	France	35–16	Scotland	(France)
2026	7 March	Murrayfield, Edinburgh	Scotland	50–40	France	(Scotland)

== See also ==
- List of international rugby union players killed in World War I
- Rugby union trophies and awards
- Millennium Trophy, for winners of England v. Ireland in the Six Nations
- Calcutta Cup, for winners of England v. Scotland in the Six Nations
- Giuseppe Garibaldi Trophy, for winners of France v. Italy in the Six Nations
- Centenary Quaich, for winners of Ireland v. Scotland in the Six Nations
- Triple Crown Trophy, if either England, Ireland, Scotland or Wales beat the other three Home Nations.
