= Millennium Trophy =

Rugby union award

- Sport: Rugby union
- Instituted: 1988
- Number of teams: 2
- Country: England; Ireland
- Holders: Ireland (18th title) (2026)
- Most titles: England (21 titles)

The Millennium Trophy (Irish: Corn na Mílaoise) is a rugby union award contested annually by England and Ireland as part of the Six Nations Championship. It was initiated in 1988 as part of Dublin's millennial celebrations. The trophy has the shape of a horned Viking helmet. As of 2026, England have won it 21 times and Ireland 18 times. It was made by an American silversmith, Charles Zanoni, in his studio in Bray, Co.Wicklow.

Ireland are the current holders after beating England at Twickenham Stadium on 21 February 2026.

== Summary ==
As of 21 February 2026.

=== Overall ===
Host	Matches	Won by England	Won by Ireland	Draws	England points	Ireland points
England	19	12	7	0	479	321
Ireland	20	9	11	0	370	338
Overall	39	21	18	0	849	659

=== Records ===
Note: Date shown in brackets indicates when the record was last set.

Record	England	Ireland
Longest winning streak	6 (21 Jan 1995–19 Oct 2001)	4 (6 Mar 2004–14 Mar 2008)
Largest points for
Home	57 (24 August 2019)	43 (24 February 2007)
Away	46 (15 February 1997)	42 (21 February 2026)
Largest winning margin
Home	42 (24 August 2019)	30 (24 February 2007)
Away	40 (15 February 1997)	21 (21 February 2026)

Team	Wins	Years
England	21	1988–92, 1995–2000, 2002, 2003, 2008, 2012–14, 2016, 2019, 2020, 2024
Ireland	18	1993, 1994, 2001, 2004–07, 2009–11, 2015, 2017, 2018, 2021–23, 2025, 2026

- Smallest winning margin: 1 point – England 12–13 Ireland, 1994; Ireland 14–13 England, 2009; England 23–22 Ireland, 2024
- Highest aggregate: 68 points – England 50–18 Ireland, 2000
- Lowest aggregate: 18 points – Ireland 6–12 England, 2013

== Results ==
No.	Date	Venue	Score	Winner	Competition	Match report
1	23 April 1988	Lansdowne Road, Dublin	10–21	England	Exhibition	
2	18 February 1989	Lansdowne Road, Dublin	3–16	England	1989 Five Nations Championship	
3	20 January 1990	Twickenham Stadium, London	23–0	England	1990 Five Nations Championship	
4	2 March 1991	Lansdowne Road, Dublin	7–16	England	1991 Five Nations Championship	
5	1 February 1992	Twickenham Stadium, London	38–9	England	1992 Five Nations Championship	
6	20 March 1993	Lansdowne Road, Dublin	17–3	Ireland	1993 Five Nations Championship	
7	19 February 1994	Twickenham Stadium, London	12–13	Ireland	1994 Five Nations Championship	
8	21 January 1995	Lansdowne Road, Dublin	8–20	England	1995 Five Nations Championship	
9	16 March 1996	Twickenham Stadium, London	28–15	England	1996 Five Nations Championship	
10	15 February 1997	Lansdowne Road, Dublin	6–46	England	1997 Five Nations Championship	
11	4 April 1998	Twickenham Stadium, London	35–17	England	1998 Five Nations Championship	
12	6 March 1999	Lansdowne Road, Dublin	15–27	England	1999 Five Nations Championship	
13	5 February 2000	Twickenham Stadium, London	50–18	England	2000 Six Nations Championship	
14	20 October 2001	Lansdowne Road, Dublin	20–14	Ireland	2001 Six Nations Championship	
15	16 February 2002	Twickenham Stadium, London	45–11	England	2002 Six Nations Championship	
16	30 March 2003	Lansdowne Road, Dublin	6–42	England	2003 Six Nations Championship	
17	6 March 2004	Twickenham Stadium, London	13–19	Ireland	2004 Six Nations Championship	
18	27 February 2005	Lansdowne Road, Dublin	19–13	Ireland	2005 Six Nations Championship	
19	18 March 2006	Twickenham Stadium, London	24–28	Ireland	2006 Six Nations Championship	
20	24 February 2007	Croke Park, Dublin	43–13	Ireland	2007 Six Nations Championship	
21	15 March 2008	Twickenham Stadium, London	33–10	England	2008 Six Nations Championship	
22	28 February 2009	Croke Park, Dublin	14–13	Ireland	2009 Six Nations Championship	
23	27 February 2010	Twickenham Stadium, London	16–20	Ireland	2010 Six Nations Championship	
24	19 March 2011	Aviva Stadium, Dublin	24–8	Ireland	2011 Six Nations Championship	
25	17 March 2012	Twickenham Stadium, London	30–9	England	2012 Six Nations Championship	
26	10 February 2013	Aviva Stadium, Dublin	6–12	England	2013 Six Nations Championship	
27	22 February 2014	Twickenham Stadium, London	13–10	England	2014 Six Nations Championship	
28	1 March 2015	Aviva Stadium, Dublin	19–9	Ireland	2015 Six Nations Championship	
29	27 February 2016	Twickenham Stadium, London	21–10	England	2016 Six Nations Championship	
30	18 March 2017	Aviva Stadium, Dublin	13–9	Ireland	2017 Six Nations Championship	
31	17 March 2018	Twickenham Stadium, London	15–24	Ireland	2018 Six Nations Championship	
32	2 February 2019	Aviva Stadium, Dublin	20–32	England	2019 Six Nations Championship	
33	23 February 2020	Twickenham Stadium, London	24–12	England	2020 Six Nations Championship	
34	20 March 2021	Aviva Stadium, Dublin	32–18	Ireland	2021 Six Nations Championship	
35	12 March 2022	Twickenham Stadium, London	15–32	Ireland	2022 Six Nations Championship	
36	18 March 2023	Aviva Stadium, Dublin	29–16	Ireland	2023 Six Nations Championship	
37	9 March 2024	Twickenham Stadium, London	23–22	England	2024 Six Nations Championship	
38	1 February 2025	Aviva Stadium, Dublin	27–22	Ireland	2025 Six Nations Championship	
39	21 February 2026	Twickenham Stadium, London	21–42	Ireland	2026 Six Nations Championship	
