= History of rugby union matches between Ireland and Wales =

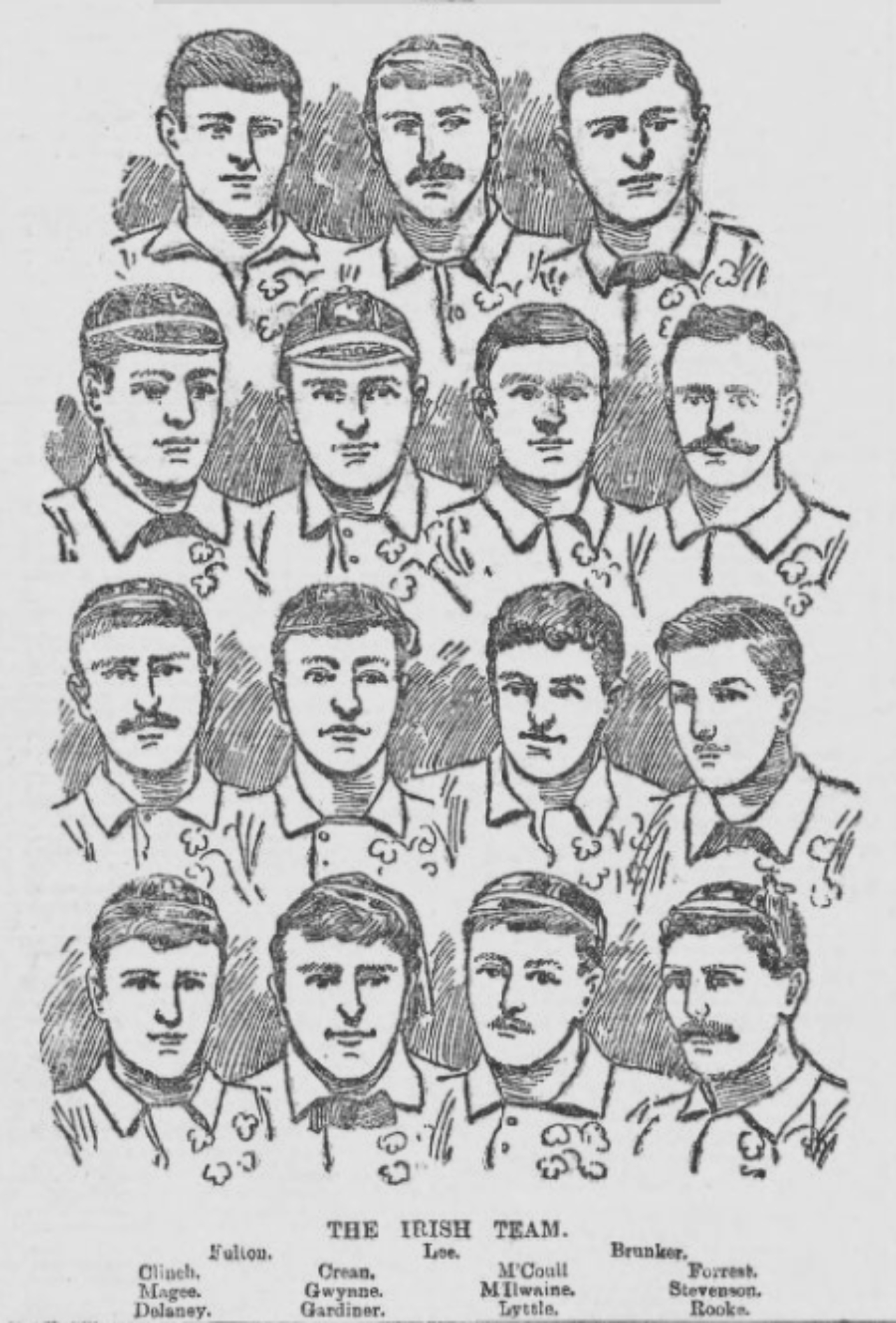
Illustration of the Irish team which faced Wales in the 1895 Home Nations Championship

Ireland and Wales have played each other at rugby union since 1882. A total of 137 matches have been played, with Wales winning 70 matches, Ireland winning 60 matches and seven matches drawn. The two sides have met three times at the Rugby World Cup, with Wales winning two and Ireland winning one of those encounters. Wales won 13–6 in their pool encounter at the inaugural World Cup in 1987. Ireland eliminated Wales at the pool stage during the 1995 World Cup, with a 24–23 victory in 1995. In their third World Cup matchup, Wales beat Ireland 22–10 in the quarterfinals of the 2011 World Cup. In the Six Nations Championship the two sides have faced each other 127 times.

== Summary ==
=== Overview ===
Details	Played	Won by Ireland	Won by Wales	Drawn	Ireland points	Wales points
In Ireland	68	35	28	5	923	708
In Wales	64	23	39	2	703	892
Neutral venue	5	2	3	0	69	81
Overall	136	60	70	7	1,695	1,681

=== Records ===
Note: Date shown in brackets indicates when the record was or last set.

Record	Ireland	Wales
Longest winning streak	5 (13 October 2001 – 19 March 2005 / 5 October 2022 – present)	5 (15 March 1975 – 15 March 1980)
Largest points for
Home	54 (3 February 2002)	32 (19 March 2005)
Away	36 (13 October 2001)	34 (21 February 1976)
Neutral	29 (20 February 1999)	22 (8 October 2011)
Largest winning margin
Home	44 (3 February 2002)	29 (9 March 1907)
Away	30 (13 October 2001)	25 (21 February 1976)
Neutral	6 (20 February 1999)	12 (8 October 2011)

=== Attendance ===
Up to date as of 6 March 2026

Total attendance*	3,163,210
Average attendance*	45,844
Highest attendance	81,314; Ireland 27–12 Wales; 13 March 2010
*Excludes 66 matches in which no attendance was reported and two matches in which Covid restricted attendance. Assumes the attendance of 1898 Home Nations match was 15,000

== Results ==
No.	Date	Venue	Score	Winner	Competition	Attendance	Ref.
1	28 January 1882	Lansdowne Road, Dublin	0–2G	Wales	1881–82 Home Nations International	—N/a	
2	12 April 1884	National Stadium, Cardiff	1G–0	Wales	1884 Home Nations Championship	5,000	
3	12 March 1887	Birkenhead Park, Birkenhead (England)	0–1G	Wales	1887 Home Nations Championship	5,000	
4	3 March 1888	Lansdowne Road, Dublin	2G–0	Ireland	1888 Home Nations Championship	4,000	
5	2 March 1889	St Helens, Swansea	0–0G (2T)	Ireland	1889 Home Nations Championship	4,000	
6	1 March 1890	Lansdowne Road, Dublin	3–3	draw	1890 Home Nations Championship	7,000	
7	7 March 1891	Stradey Park, Llanelli	6–4	Wales	1891 Home Nations Championship	10,000	
8	5 March 1892	Lansdowne Road, Dublin	9–0	Ireland	1892 Home Nations Championship	5,000	
9	11 March 1893	Stradey Park, Llanelli	2–0	Wales	1893 Home Nations Championship	20,000	
10	10 March 1894	Ulster Cricket Ground, Belfast	3–0	Ireland	1894 Home Nations Championship	5,000	
11	16 March 1895	National Stadium, Cardiff	5–3	Wales	1895 Home Nations Championship	—N/a	
12	17 March 1896	Lansdowne Road, Dublin	8–4	Ireland	1896 Home Nations Championship	—N/a	
13	19 March 1898	Thomond Park, Limerick	3–11	Wales	1898 Home Nations Championship	10–15,000	
14	18 March 1899	National Stadium, Cardiff	0–3	Ireland	1899 Home Nations Championship	40,000	
15	17 March 1900	Balmoral Showgrounds, Balmoral	0–3	Wales	1900 Home Nations Championship	—N/a	
16	16 March 1901	St Helen's, Swansea	10–9	Wales	1901 Home Nations Championship	—N/a	
17	6 March 1902	Lansdowne Road, Dublin	0–15	Wales	1902 Home Nations Championship	12,000	
18	14 March 1903	National Stadium, Cardiff	18–0	Wales	1903 Home Nations Championship	—N/a	
19	12 March 1904	Balmoral Showgrounds, Balmoral	14–12	Ireland	1904 Home Nations Championship	—N/a	
20	11 March 1905	St Helen's, Swansea	10–3	Wales	1905 Home Nations Championship	—N/a	
21	10 March 1906	Balmoral Showgrounds, Balmoral	11–6	Ireland	1906 Home Nations Championship	—N/a	
22	9 March 1907	National Stadium, Cardiff	29–0	Wales	1907 Home Nations Championship	—N/a	
23	14 March 1908	Balmoral Showgrounds, Balmoral	5–11	Wales	1908 Home Nations Championship	15,000	
24	13 March 1909	St Helen's, Swansea	18–5	Wales	1909 Home Nations Championship	25,000	
25	12 March 1910	Lansdowne Road, Dublin	3–19	Wales	1910 Five Nations Championship	—N/a	
26	11 March 1911	National Stadium, Cardiff	16–0	Wales	1911 Five Nations Championship	—N/a	
27	9 March 1912	Balmoral Showgrounds, Balmoral	12–5	Ireland	1912 Five Nations Championship	—N/a	
28	8 March 1913	St Helen's, Swansea	16–13	Wales	1913 Five Nations Championship	—N/a	
29	14 March 1914	Balmoral Showgrounds, Balmoral	3–11	Wales	1914 Five Nations Championship	—N/a	
30	13 March 1920	National Stadium, Cardiff	28–4	Wales	1920 Five Nations Championship	35,000	
31	12 March 1921	Balmoral Showgrounds, Balmoral	0–6	Wales	1921 Five Nations Championship	—N/a	
32	11 March 1922	St Helen's, Swansea	11–5	Wales	1922 Five Nations Championship	40,000	
33	10 March 1923	Lansdowne Road, Dublin	5–4	Ireland	1923 Five Nations Championship	—N/a	
34	8 March 1924	National Stadium, Cardiff	10–13	Ireland	1924 Five Nations Championship	35,000	
35	14 March 1925	Ravenhill, Belfast	19–3	Ireland	1925 Five Nations Championship	—N/a	
36	13 March 1926	St Helen's, Swansea	11–8	Wales	1926 Five Nations Championship	—N/a	
37	12 March 1927	Lansdowne Road, Dublin	19–9	Ireland	1927 Five Nations Championship	—N/a	
38	10 March 1928	National Stadium, Cardiff	10–13	Ireland	1928 Five Nations Championship	42,000	
39	9 March 1929	Ravenhill, Belfast	5–5	draw	1929 Five Nations Championship	—N/a	
40	8 March 1930	St Helen's, Swansea	12–7	Wales	1930 Five Nations Championship	50,000	
41	14 March 1931	Ravenhill, Belfast	3–15	Wales	1931 Five Nations Championship	30,000	
42	12 March 1932	National Stadium, Cardiff	10–12	Ireland	1932 Home Nations Championship	—N/a	
43	11 March 1933	Ravenhill, Belfast	10–5	Ireland	1933 Home Nations Championship	—N/a	
44	10 March 1934	St Helen's, Swansea	13–0	Wales	1934 Home Nations Championship	—N/a	
45	9 March 1935	Ravenhill, Belfast	9–3	Ireland	1935 Home Nations Championship	35,000	
46	14 March 1936	National Stadium, Cardiff	3–0	Wales	1936 Home Nations Championship	70,000	
47	3 April 1937	Ravenhill, Belfast	5–3	Ireland	1937 Home Nations Championship	20,000	
48	12 March 1938	St Helen's, Swansea	11–5	Wales	1938 Home Nations Championship	40,000	
49	11 March 1939	Ravenhill, Belfast	0–7	Wales	1939 Home Nations Championship	—N/a	
50	29 March 1947	St Helen's, Swansea	6–0	Wales	1947 Five Nations Championship	36,000	
51	13 March 1948	Ravenhill, Belfast	6–3	Ireland	1948 Five Nations Championship	32,000	
52	12 March 1949	St Helen's, Swansea	0–5	Ireland	1949 Five Nations Championship	40,000	
53	11 March 1950	Ravenhill, Belfast	3–6	Wales	1950 Five Nations Championship	—N/a	
54	10 March 1951	National Stadium, Cardiff	3–3	draw	1951 Five Nations Championship	—N/a	
55	8 March 1952	Lansdowne Road, Dublin	3–14	Wales	1952 Five Nations Championship	42,000	
56	14 March 1953	St Helen's, Swansea	5–3	Wales	1953 Five Nations Championship	50,000	
57	13 March 1954	Lansdowne Road, Dublin	9–12	Wales	1954 Five Nations Championship	45,000	
58	12 March 1955	National Stadium, Cardiff	21–3	Wales	1955 Five Nations Championship	—N/a	
59	10 March 1956	Lansdowne Road, Dublin	11–3	Ireland	1956 Five Nations Championship	50,573	
60	9 March 1957	National Stadium, Cardiff	6–5	Wales	1957 Five Nations Championship	—N/a	
61	15 March 1958	Lansdowne Road, Dublin	6–9	Wales	1958 Five Nations Championship	—N/a	
62	14 March 1959	National Stadium, Cardiff	8–6	Wales	1959 Five Nations Championship	—N/a	
63	12 March 1960	Lansdowne Road, Dublin	9–10	Wales	1960 Five Nations Championship	—N/a	
64	11 March 1961	National Stadium, Cardiff	9–0	Wales	1961 Five Nations Championship	—N/a	
65	17 November 1962	Lansdowne Road, Dublin	3–3	draw	1962 Five Nations Championship	—N/a	
66	9 March 1963	National Stadium, Cardiff	6–14	Ireland	1963 Five Nations Championship	—N/a	
67	7 March 1964	Lansdowne Road, Dublin	6–15	Wales	1964 Five Nations Championship	—N/a	
68	13 March 1965	National Stadium, Cardiff	14–8	Wales	1965 Five Nations Championship	58,500	
69	12 March 1966	Lansdowne Road, Dublin	9–6	Ireland	1966 Five Nations Championship	—N/a	
70	11 March 1967	National Stadium, Cardiff	0–3	Ireland	1967 Five Nations Championship	—N/a	
71	9 March 1968	Lansdowne Road, Dublin	9–6	Ireland	1968 Five Nations Championship	—N/a	
72	8 March 1969	National Stadium, Cardiff	24–11	Wales	1969 Five Nations Championship	29,000	
73	14 March 1970	Lansdowne Road, Dublin	14–0	Ireland	1970 Five Nations Championship	—N/a	
74	13 March 1971	National Stadium, Cardiff	23–9	Wales	1971 Five Nations Championship	—N/a	
75	10 March 1973	Cardiff Arms Park, Cardiff	16–12	Wales	1973 Five Nations Championship	—N/a	
76	2 February 1974	Lansdowne Road, Dublin	9–9	draw	1974 Five Nations Championship	—N/a	
77	15 March 1975	Cardiff Arms Park, Cardiff	32–4	Wales	1975 Five Nations Championship	—N/a	
78	21 February 1976	Lansdowne Road, Dublin	9–34	Wales	1976 Five Nations Championship	—N/a	
79	15 January 1977	Cardiff Arms Park, Cardiff	25–9	Wales	1977 Five Nations Championship	—N/a	
80	4 March 1978	Lansdowne Road, Dublin	16–20	Wales	1978 Five Nations Championship	—N/a	
81	3 February 1979	Cardiff Arms Park, Cardiff	24–21	Wales	1979 Five Nations Championship	—N/a	
82	15 March 1980	Lansdowne Road, Dublin	21–7	Ireland	1980 Five Nations Championship	—N/a	
83	21 February 1981	Cardiff Arms Park, Cardiff	9–8	Wales	1981 Five Nations Championship	—N/a	
84	23 January 1982	Lansdowne Road, Dublin	20–12	Ireland	1982 Five Nations Championship	—N/a	
85	5 March 1983	Cardiff Arms Park, Cardiff	23–9	Wales	1983 Five Nations Championship	—N/a	
86	4 February 1984	Lansdowne Road, Dublin	9–18	Wales	1984 Five Nations Championship	—N/a	
87	16 March 1985	Cardiff Arms Park, Cardiff	9–21	Ireland	1985 Five Nations Championship	—N/a	
88	15 February 1986	Lansdowne Road, Dublin	12–19	Wales	1986 Five Nations Championship	—N/a	
89	4 April 1987	Cardiff Arms Park, Cardiff	11–15	Ireland	1987 Five Nations Championship	—N/a	
90	25 May 1987	Athletic Park, Wellington (New Zealand)	6–13	Wales	1987 Rugby World Cup	17,500	
91	5 March 1988	Lansdowne Road, Dublin	9–12	Wales	1988 Five Nations Championship	—N/a	
92	4 February 1989	Cardiff Arms Park, Cardiff	13–19	Ireland	1989 Five Nations Championship	—N/a	
93	24 March 1990	Lansdowne Road, Dublin	14–8	Ireland	1990 Five Nations Championship	—N/a	
94	16 February 1991	Cardiff Arms Park, Cardiff	21–21	draw	1991 Five Nations Championship	—N/a	
95	18 January 1992	Lansdowne Road, Dublin	15–16	Wales	1992 Five Nations Championship	—N/a	
96	6 March 1993	Cardiff Arms Park, Cardiff	14–19	Ireland	1993 Five Nations Championship	—N/a	
97	5 February 1994	Lansdowne Road, Dublin	15–17	Wales	1994 Five Nations Championship	—N/a	
98	18 March 1995	Cardiff Arms Park, Cardiff	12–16	Ireland	1995 Five Nations Championship	—N/a	
99	4 June 1995	Ellis Park Stadium, Johannesburg (South Africa)	24–23	Ireland	1995 Rugby World Cup	35,000	
100	2 March 1996	Lansdowne Road, Dublin	30–17	Ireland	1996 Five Nations Championship	45,000	
101	1 February 1997	National Stadium, Cardiff	25–26	Ireland	1997 Five Nations Championship	53,000	
102	21 March 1998	Lansdowne Road, Dublin	21–30	Wales	1998 Five Nations Championship	55,000	
103	20 February 1999	Wembley Stadium, London (England)	23–29	Ireland	1999 Five Nations Championship	76,000	
104	1 April 2000	Lansdowne Road, Dublin	19–23	Wales	2000 Six Nations Championship	40,000	
105	13 October 2001	Millennium Stadium, Cardiff	6–36	Ireland	2001 Six Nations Championship	72,500	
106	3 February 2002	Lansdowne Road, Dublin	54–10	Ireland	2002 Six Nations Championship	49,000	
107	22 March 2003	Millennium Stadium, Cardiff	24–25	Ireland	2003 Six Nations Championship	72,500	
108	16 August 2003	Lansdowne Road, Dublin	35–12	Ireland	2003 Rugby World Cup warm-up match	20,000	
109	22 February 2004	Lansdowne Road, Dublin	36–15	Ireland	2004 Six Nations Championship	49,000	
110	19 March 2005	Millennium Stadium, Cardiff	32–20	Wales	2005 Six Nations Championship	74,500	
111	26 February 2006	Lansdowne Road, Dublin	31–5	Ireland	2006 Six Nations Championship	49,500	
112	4 February 2007	Millennium Stadium, Cardiff	9–19	Ireland	2007 Six Nations Championship	74,239	
113	8 March 2008	Croke Park, Dublin	12–16	Wales	2008 Six Nations Championship	75,000	
114	21 March 2009	Millennium Stadium, Cardiff	15–17	Ireland	2009 Six Nations Championship	74,645	
115	13 March 2010	Croke Park, Dublin	27–12	Ireland	2010 Six Nations Championship	81,314	
116	12 March 2011	Millennium Stadium, Cardiff	19–13	Wales	2011 Six Nations Championship	74,233	
117	8 October 2011	Regional Stadium, Wellington, New Zealand	22–10	Wales	2011 Rugby World Cup	35,787	
118	5 February 2012	Aviva Stadium, Dublin	21–23	Wales	2012 Six Nations Championship	51,000	
119	2 February 2013	Millennium Stadium, Cardiff	22–30	Ireland	2013 Six Nations Championship	73,230	
120	8 February 2014	Aviva Stadium, Dublin	26–3	Ireland	2014 Six Nations Championship	51,045	
121	14 March 2015	Millennium Stadium, Cardiff	23–16	Wales	2015 Six Nations Championship	73,950	
122	8 August 2015	Millennium Stadium, Cardiff	21–35	Ireland	2015 Rugby World Cup warm-up match	73,500	
123	29 August 2015	Aviva Stadium, Dublin	10–16	Wales	2015 Rugby World Cup warm-up match	47,430	
124	7 February 2016	Aviva Stadium, Dublin	16–16	draw	2016 Six Nations Championship	51,700	
125	10 March 2017	Millennium Stadium, Cardiff	22–9	Wales	2017 Six Nations Championship	74,159	
126	24 February 2018	Aviva Stadium, Dublin	37–27	Ireland	2018 Six Nations Championship	51,700	
127	16 March 2019	Millennium Stadium, Cardiff	25–7	Wales	2019 Six Nations Championship	74,500	
128	31 August 2019	Millennium Stadium, Cardiff	17–22	Ireland	2019 Rugby World Cup warm-up match	62,905	
129	7 September 2019	Aviva Stadium, Dublin	19–10	Ireland	2019 Rugby World Cup warm-up match	50,000	
130	8 February 2020	Aviva Stadium, Dublin	24–14	Ireland	2020 Six Nations Championship	51,700	
131	13 November 2020	Aviva Stadium, Dublin	32–9	Ireland	Autumn Nations Cup	0*	
132	7 February 2021	Millennium Stadium, Cardiff	21–16	Wales	2021 Six Nations Championship	0*	
133	5 February 2022	Aviva Stadium, Dublin	29–7	Ireland	2022 Six Nations Championship	51,700	
134	4 February 2023	Millennium Stadium, Cardiff	10–34	Ireland	2023 Six Nations Championship	74,500	
135	24 February 2024	Aviva Stadium, Dublin	31–7	Ireland	2024 Six Nations Championship	51,700	
136	22 February 2025	Millennium Stadium, Cardiff	18–27	Ireland	2025 Six Nations Championship	71,000	
137	06 March 2026	Aviva Stadium, Dublin	27–17	Ireland	2026 Six Nations Championship	51,700	

== Results by Decade ==
Decade	Ireland	Wales	Drawn	Series winner
1880s	2	3	0	Wales
1890s	4	4	1	Drawn
1900s	2	8	0	Wales
1910s	1	4	0	Wales
1920s	5	4	1	Ireland
1930s	4	6	0	Wales
1940s	2	1	0	Ireland
1950s	1	8	1	Wales
1960s	4	5	1	Wales
1970s	1	7	1	Wales
1980s	5	6	0	Wales
1990s	7	3	1	Ireland
2000s	8	3	0	Ireland
2010s	7	7	1	Drawn
2020s	7	1	0	Ireland
