= History of rugby union matches between England and Ireland =

England and Ireland have played rugby union internationals against each other since 1875, with England winning the first match at The Oval, London by two goals to nil (A points scoring system was not used in rugby at the time). The two teams have played a total of 144 Test matches with England winning 81 of them, Ireland 55 and 8 resulting in a draw. However, since rugby union went professional in 1995, the head-to-head is much closer. Since then the teams have met 36 times with England winning 19 test matches to Ireland's 17.

Apart from their annual match during the Six Nations Championship, the teams have also met on six other occasions, with England winning five. The sides have played four warm-up matches prior to the 2011, 2015, 2019, 2023 World Cups. They played a one-off match in April 1988 to celebrate the millennium of the city of Dublin in which the winners of the 1988 match, England, were awarded the Millennium Trophy. This then became the trophy for the annual match between the teams in the Six Nations Championship. The sides also faced off in the inaugural Autumn Nations Cup which took place in November 2020.

Ireland achieved a record away winning margin over England when they beat them 21–42 on 21 February 2026.

== Millennium Trophy ==
The Millennium Trophy is a rugby union award contested annually by England and Ireland as part of the Six Nations Championship. It was initiated in 1988 as part of Dublin's millennial celebrations. The trophy has the shape of a horned Viking helmet. As of 2026, England have won it 21 times and Ireland 18 times. The Millennium Trophy is currently held by Ireland, who beat England 21–42 at Twickenham Stadium.

== Summary ==
=== Overall ===
Details	Played	Won by England	Won by Ireland	Drawn	England points	Ireland points
In England	72	48	20	4	1,073	647
In Ireland	72	33	35	4	733	736
Overall	144	81	55	8	1,806	1,383

=== Records ===
Note: Date shown in brackets indicates when the record was last set.

Record	England	Ireland
Longest winning streak	8 (10 February 1912 – 9 February 1924)	5 (12 February 1972 – 6 March 1976)
Largest points for
Home	57 (24 August 2019)	43 (24 February 2007)
Away	46 (15 February 1997)	42 (21 February 2026)
Largest winning margin
Home	42 (24 August 2019)	30 (24 February 2007)
Away	40 (15 February 1997)	21 (21 February 2026)

=== Attendance ===
Up to date as of 22 February 2026

Total attendance*	2,971,995
Average attendance*	45,723
Highest attendance	82,062; England 15–24 Ireland; 17 Mar 2018
*Excludes 77 matches in which no attendance was reported and two matches in which Covid restricted attendance

== Results ==
No.	Date	Venue	Score	Winner	Competition	Attendance	Ref.
1	15 February 1875	The Oval, London	(2T) 2G–0G (0)	England	1874–75 Home Nations International	3,000	
2	13 December 1875	Rathmines, Dublin	(0) 0G–1G (2T)	England	1875–76 Home Nations International	—N/a	
3	5 February 1877	The Oval, London	(4T) 2G–0G (0)	England	1876–77 Home Nations International		
4	11 March 1878	Lansdowne Road, Dublin	(0) 0G–2G (3T)	England	1877–78 Home Nations International	—N/a	
5	24 March 1879	The Oval, London	(4T) 3G–0G (0)	England	1878–79 Home Nations International	—N/a	
6	2 February 1880	Lansdowne Road, Dublin	(1T) 0G–1G (2T)	England	1879–80 Home Nations International	—N/a	
7	5 February 1881	Whalley Range, Manchester	(4T) 2G–0G (0)	England	1880–81 Home Nations International	—N/a	
8	6 February 1882	Lansdowne Road, Dublin	(2T) 0G–0G (2T)	draw	1881–82 Home Nations International	5,000	
9	5 February 1883	Whalley Range, Manchester	(4T) 1G–0G (1T)	England	1883 Home Nations Championship	—N/a	
10	4 February 1884	Lansdowne Road, Dublin	(0) 0G–1G (1T)	England	1884 Home Nations Championship	—N/a	
11	7 February 1885	Whalley Range, Manchester	(2T) 0G–0G (1T)	England	1885 Home Nations Championship	7,000	
12	6 February 1886	Lansdowne Road, Dublin	(0) 0G–0G (1T)	England	1886 Home Nations Championship	—N/a	
13	5 February 1887	Lansdowne Road, Dublin	(2T) 2G–0G (0)	Ireland	1887 Home Nations Championship	—N/a	
14	15 March 1890	Rectory Field, Blackheath	3–0	England	1890 Home Nations Championship	12,000	
15	7 February 1891	Lansdowne Road, Dublin	0–9	England	1891 Home Nations Championship	—N/a	
16	6 February 1892	Whalley Range, Manchester	7–0	England	1892 Home Nations Championship	—N/a	
17	4 February 1893	Lansdowne Road, Dublin	0–4	England	1893 Home Nations Championship	7,000	
18	3 February 1894	Rectory Field, Blackheath	5–7	Ireland	1894 Home Nations Championship	20,000	
19	2 February 1895	Lansdowne Road, Dublin	3–6	England	1895 Home Nations Championship	9,000	
20	1 February 1896	Meanwood Road, Leeds	4–10	Ireland	1896 Home Nations Championship	17,858	
21	6 February 1897	Lansdowne Road, Dublin	13–9	Ireland	1897 Home Nations Championship	15,000	
22	5 February 1898	Athletic Ground, Richmond	6–9	Ireland	1898 Home Nations Championship	20,000	
23	4 February 1899	Lansdowne Road, Dublin	6–0	Ireland	1899 Home Nations Championship	12,000	
24	3 February 1900	Athletic Ground, Richmond	15–4	England	1900 Home Nations Championship	10,000	
25	9 February 1901	Lansdowne Road, Dublin	10–6	Ireland	1901 Home Nations Championship	8,000	
26	8 February 1902	Welford Road, Leicester	6–3	England	1902 Home Nations Championship	20,000	
27	14 February 1903	Lansdowne Road, Dublin	6–0	Ireland	1903 Home Nations Championship	—N/a	
28	13 February 1904	Rectory Field, Blackheath	19–0	England	1904 Home Nations Championship	—N/a	
29	11 February 1905	Mardyke, Cork	17–3	Ireland	1905 Home Nations Championship	12,000	
30	10 February 1906	Welford Road, Leicester	6–16	Ireland	1906 Home Nations Championship	10,000	
31	9 February 1907	Lansdowne Road, Dublin	17–9	Ireland	1907 Home Nations Championship	10,000	
32	8 February 1908	Athletic Ground, Richmond	13–3	England	1908 Home Nations Championship	—N/a	
33	13 February 1909	Lansdowne Road, Dublin	5–11	England	1909 Home Nations Championship	—N/a	
34	11 February 1910	Twickenham Stadium, London	0–0	draw	1910 Five Nations Championship	14,000	
35	11 February 1911	Lansdowne Road, Dublin	3–0	Ireland	1911 Five Nations Championship	—N/a	
36	10 February 1912	Twickenham Stadium, London	15–0	England	1912 Five Nations Championship	25,000	
37	9 February 1913	Lansdowne Road, Dublin	4–15	England	1913 Five Nations Championship	15,000	
38	14 February 1914	Twickenham Stadium, London	17–12	England	1914 Five Nations Championship	40,000	
39	14 February 1920	Lansdowne Road, Dublin	11–14	England	1920 Five Nations Championship	—N/a	
40	12 February 1921	Twickenham Stadium, London	15–0	England	1921 Five Nations Championship	27,500	
41	11 February 1922	Lansdowne Road, Dublin	3–12	England	1922 Five Nations Championship	—N/a	
42	10 February 1923	Welford Road, Leicester	23–5	England	1923 Five Nations Championship	20,000	
43	9 February 1924	Ravenhill Stadium, Belfast	3–14	England	1924 Five Nations Championship	15,000	
44	14 February 1925	Twickenham Stadium, London	6–6	draw	1925 Five Nations Championship	—N/a	
45	13 February 1926	Lansdowne Road, Dublin	19–15	Ireland	1926 Five Nations Championship	—N/a	
46	12 February 1927	Twickenham Stadium, London	8–6	England	1927 Five Nations Championship	45,000	
47	11 February 1928	Lansdowne Road, Dublin	6–7	England	1928 Five Nations Championship	—N/a	
48	9 February 1929	Twickenham Stadium, London	5–6	Ireland	1929 Five Nations Championship	—N/a	
49	8 February 1930	Lansdowne Road, Dublin	4–3	Ireland	1930 Five Nations Championship	—N/a	
50	14 February 1931	Twickenham Stadium, London	5–6	Ireland	1931 Five Nations Championship	60,000	
51	13 February 1932	Lansdowne Road, Dublin	8–11	England	1932 Home Nations Championship	—N/a	
52	11 February 1933	Twickenham Stadium, London	17–6	England	1933 Home Nations Championship	—N/a	
53	10 February 1934	Lansdowne Road, Dublin	3–13	England	1934 Home Nations Championship	—N/a	
54	9 February 1935	Twickenham Stadium, London	14–3	England	1935 Home Nations Championship	—N/a	
55	8 February 1936	Lansdowne Road, Dublin	6–3	Ireland	1936 Home Nations Championship	36,000	
56	13 February 1937	Twickenham Stadium, London	9–8	England	1937 Home Nations Championship	—N/a	
57	12 February 1938	Lansdowne Road, Dublin	14–36	England	1938 Home Nations Championship	—N/a	
58	11 February 1939	Twickenham Stadium, London	0–5	Ireland	1939 Home Nations Championship	—N/a	
59	8 February 1947	Lansdowne Road, Dublin	22–0	Ireland	1947 Five Nations Championship	—N/a	
60	14 February 1948	Twickenham Stadium, London	10–11	Ireland	1948 Five Nations Championship	—N/a	Clip
61	12 February 1949	Lansdowne Road, Dublin	14–5	Ireland	1949 Five Nations Championship	—N/a	
62	11 February 1950	Twickenham Stadium, London	3–0	England	1950 Five Nations Championship	—N/a	
63	10 February 1951	Lansdowne Road, Dublin	3–0	Ireland	1951 Five Nations Championship	45,000	
64	29 March 1952	Twickenham Stadium, London	3–0	England	1952 Five Nations Championship	—N/a	
65	11 February 1953	Lansdowne Road, Dublin	9–9	draw	1953 Five Nations Championship	—N/a	
66	13 February 1954	Twickenham Stadium, London	14–3	England	1954 Five Nations Championship	—N/a	
67	12 February 1955	Lansdowne Road, Dublin	6–6	draw	1955 Five Nations Championship	45,000	
68	11 February 1956	Twickenham Stadium, London	20–0	England	1956 Five Nations Championship	—N/a	
69	9 February 1957	Lansdowne Road, Dublin	0–6	England	1957 Five Nations Championship	—N/a	
70	8 February 1958	Twickenham Stadium, London	6–0	England	1958 Five Nations Championship	—N/a	
71	14 February 1959	Lansdowne Road, Dublin	0–3	England	1959 Five Nations Championship	50,000	
72	13 February 1960	Twickenham Stadium, London	8–5	England	1960 Five Nations Championship	—N/a	
73	11 February 1961	Lansdowne Road, Dublin	11–8	Ireland	1961 Five Nations Championship	—N/a	
74	10 February 1962	Twickenham Stadium, London	16–0	England	1962 Five Nations Championship	—N/a	
75	9 February 1963	Lansdowne Road, Dublin	0–0	draw	1963 Five Nations Championship	—N/a	
76	8 February 1964	Twickenham Stadium, London	5–18	Ireland	1964 Five Nations Championship	—N/a	
77	13 February 1965	Lansdowne Road, Dublin	5–0	Ireland	1965 Five Nations Championship	—N/a	
78	12 February 1966	Twickenham Stadium, London	6–6	draw	1966 Five Nations Championship	—N/a	
79	11 February 1967	Lansdowne Road, Dublin	3–8	England	1967 Five Nations Championship	—N/a	
80	10 February 1968	Twickenham Stadium, London	9–9	draw	1968 Five Nations Championship	—N/a	
81	8 February 1969	Lansdowne Road, Dublin	17–15	Ireland	1969 Five Nations Championship	—N/a	
82	14 February 1970	Twickenham Stadium, London	9–3	England	1970 Five Nations Championship	—N/a	
83	13 February 1971	Lansdowne Road, Dublin	6–9	England	1971 Five Nations Championship	—N/a	
84	12 February 1972	Twickenham Stadium, London	12–16	Ireland	1972 Five Nations Championship	—N/a	
85	10 February 1973	Lansdowne Road, Dublin	18–9	Ireland	1973 Five Nations Championship	50,000	
86	16 February 1974	Twickenham Stadium, London	21–26	Ireland	1974 Five Nations Championship	—N/a	
87	18 January 1975	Lansdowne Road, Dublin	12–9	Ireland	1975 Five Nations Championship	—N/a	
88	6 March 1976	Twickenham Stadium, London	12–13	Ireland	1976 Five Nations Championship	—N/a	
89	5 February 1977	Lansdowne Road, Dublin	0–4	England	1977 Five Nations Championship	—N/a	
90	18 March 1978	Twickenham Stadium, London	15–9	England	1978 Five Nations Championship	—N/a	
91	17 February 1979	Lansdowne Road, Dublin	12–7	Ireland	1979 Five Nations Championship	—N/a	
92	19 January 1980	Twickenham Stadium, London	24–9	England	1980 Five Nations Championship	—N/a	
93	7 March 1981	Lansdowne Road, Dublin	6–10	England	1981 Five Nations Championship	—N/a	
94	6 February 1982	Twickenham Stadium, London	15–16	Ireland	1982 Five Nations Championship	—N/a	
95	19 March 1983	Lansdowne Road, Dublin	25–15	Ireland	1983 Five Nations Championship	—N/a	
96	18 February 1984	Twickenham Stadium, London	12–9	England	1984 Five Nations Championship	—N/a	
97	30 March 1985	Lansdowne Road, Dublin	13–10	Ireland	1985 Five Nations Championship	—N/a	
98	1 March 1986	Twickenham Stadium, London	25–20	England	1986 Five Nations Championship	—N/a	
99	7 February 1987	Lansdowne Road, Dublin	17–0	Ireland	1987 Five Nations Championship	—N/a	
100	19 March 1988	Twickenham Stadium, London	35–3	England	1988 Five Nations Championship	—N/a	
101	23 April 1988	Lansdowne Road, Dublin	10–21	England	Millennium Trophy	—N/a	
102	18 February 1989	Lansdowne Road, Dublin	3–16	England	1989 Five Nations Championship	—N/a	
103	20 January 1990	Twickenham Stadium, London	23–0	England	1990 Five Nations Championship	—N/a	
104	2 March 1991	Lansdowne Road, Dublin	7–16	England	1991 Five Nations Championship	—N/a	
105	1 February 1992	Twickenham Stadium, London	38–9	England	1992 Five Nations Championship	—N/a	
106	20 March 1993	Lansdowne Road, Dublin	17–3	Ireland	1993 Five Nations Championship	—N/a	
107	19 February 1994	Twickenham Stadium, London	12–13	Ireland	1994 Five Nations Championship	—N/a	
108	21 January 1995	Lansdowne Road, Dublin	8–20	England	1995 Five Nations Championship	—N/a	
109	16 March 1996	Twickenham Stadium, London	28–15	England	1996 Five Nations Championship	75,000	
110	15 February 1997	Lansdowne Road, Dublin	6–46	England	1997 Five Nations Championship	51,898	
111	4 April 1998	Twickenham Stadium, London	35–17	England	1998 Five Nations Championship	75,000	
112	6 March 1999	Lansdowne Road, Dublin	15–27	England	1999 Five Nations Championship	49,000	
113	5 February 2000	Twickenham Stadium, London	50–18	England	2000 Six Nations Championship	75,000	
114	20 October 2001	Lansdowne Road, Dublin	20–14	Ireland	2001 Six Nations Championship	49,000	
115	16 February 2002	Twickenham Stadium, London	45–11	England	2002 Six Nations Championship	75,000	
116	30 March 2003	Lansdowne Road, Dublin	6–42	England	2003 Six Nations Championship	48,000	
117	6 March 2004	Twickenham Stadium, London	13–19	Ireland	2004 Six Nations Championship	72,000	
118	27 February 2005	Lansdowne Road, Dublin	19–13	Ireland	2005 Six Nations Championship	49,250	
119	18 March 2006	Twickenham Stadium, London	24–28	Ireland	2006 Six Nations Championship	68,000	
120	24 February 2007	Croke Park, Dublin	43–13	Ireland	2007 Six Nations Championship	82,300	
121	15 March 2008	Twickenham Stadium, London	33–10	England	2008 Six Nations Championship	82,000	
122	28 February 2009	Croke Park, Dublin	14–13	Ireland	2009 Six Nations Championship	82,000	
123	27 February 2010	Twickenham Stadium, London	16–20	Ireland	2010 Six Nations Championship	81,554	
124	19 March 2011	Aviva Stadium, Dublin	24–8	Ireland	2011 Six Nations Championship	51,000	
125	27 August 2011	Aviva Stadium, Dublin	9–20	England	2011 Rugby World Cup warm-up match	48,523	
126	17 March 2012	Twickenham Stadium, London	30–9	England	2012 Six Nations Championship	80,567	
127	10 February 2013	Aviva Stadium, Dublin	6–12	England	2013 Six Nations Championship	51,000	
128	22 February 2014	Twickenham Stadium, London	13–10	England	2014 Six Nations Championship	81,835	
129	1 March 2015	Aviva Stadium, Dublin	19–9	Ireland	2015 Six Nations Championship	51,500	
130	5 September 2015	Twickenham Stadium, London	21–13	England	2015 Rugby World Cup warm-up match	80,138	
131	27 February 2016	Twickenham Stadium, London	21–10	England	2016 Six Nations Championship	81,826	
132	18 March 2017	Aviva Stadium, Dublin	13–9	Ireland	2017 Six Nations Championship	51,700	
133	17 March 2018	Twickenham Stadium, London	15–24	Ireland	2018 Six Nations Championship	82,062	
134	2 February 2019	Aviva Stadium, Dublin	20–32	England	2019 Six Nations Championship	51,000	
135	24 August 2019	Twickenham Stadium, London	57–15	England	2019 Rugby World Cup warm-up match	80,000	
136	23 February 2020	Twickenham Stadium, London	24–12	England	2020 Six Nations Championship	81,476	
137	21 November 2020	Twickenham Stadium, London	18–7	England	Autumn Nations Cup	0*	
138	20 March 2021	Aviva Stadium, Dublin	32–18	Ireland	2021 Six Nations Championship	0*	
139	12 March 2022	Twickenham Stadium, London	15–32	Ireland	2022 Six Nations Championship	81,658	
140	18 March 2023	Aviva Stadium, Dublin	29–16	Ireland	2023 Six Nations Championship	51,700	
141	19 August 2023	Aviva Stadium, Dublin	29–10	Ireland	2023 Rugby World Cup warm-up match	51,000	
142	9 March 2024	Twickenham Stadium, London	23–22	England	2024 Six Nations Championship	81,686	
143	1 February 2025	Aviva Stadium, Dublin	27–22	Ireland	2025 Six Nations Championship	51,700	
144	21 February 2026	Twickenham Stadium, London	21–42	Ireland	2026 Six Nations Championship	81,953	

== Results by decade ==
Decade	England	Ireland	Drawn	Series winner
1870s	5	0	0	England
1880s	6	1	1	England
1890s	5	5	0	Drawn
1900s	5	5	0	Drawn
1910s	3	1	1	England
1920s	7	2	1	England
1930s	6	4	0	England
1940s	0	3	0	Ireland
1950s	7	1	2	England
1960s	3	4	3	Ireland
1970s	4	6	0	Ireland
1980s	7	4	0	England
1990s	8	2	0	England
2000s	4	6	0	Ireland
2010s	8	5	0	England
2020s	3	6	0	Ireland

== Gallery ==
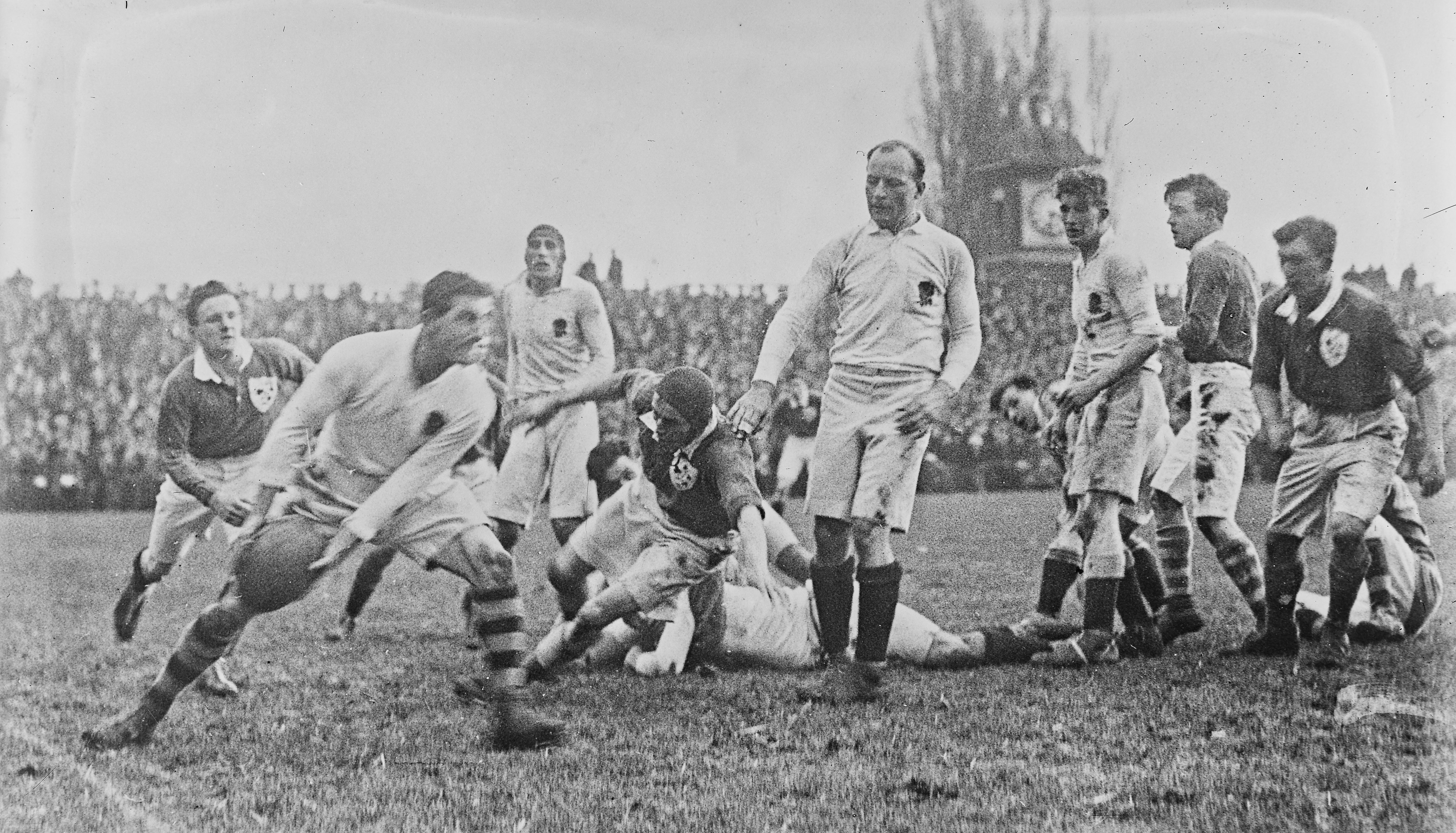
Ireland and England play at Twickenham during the 1921 Five Nations

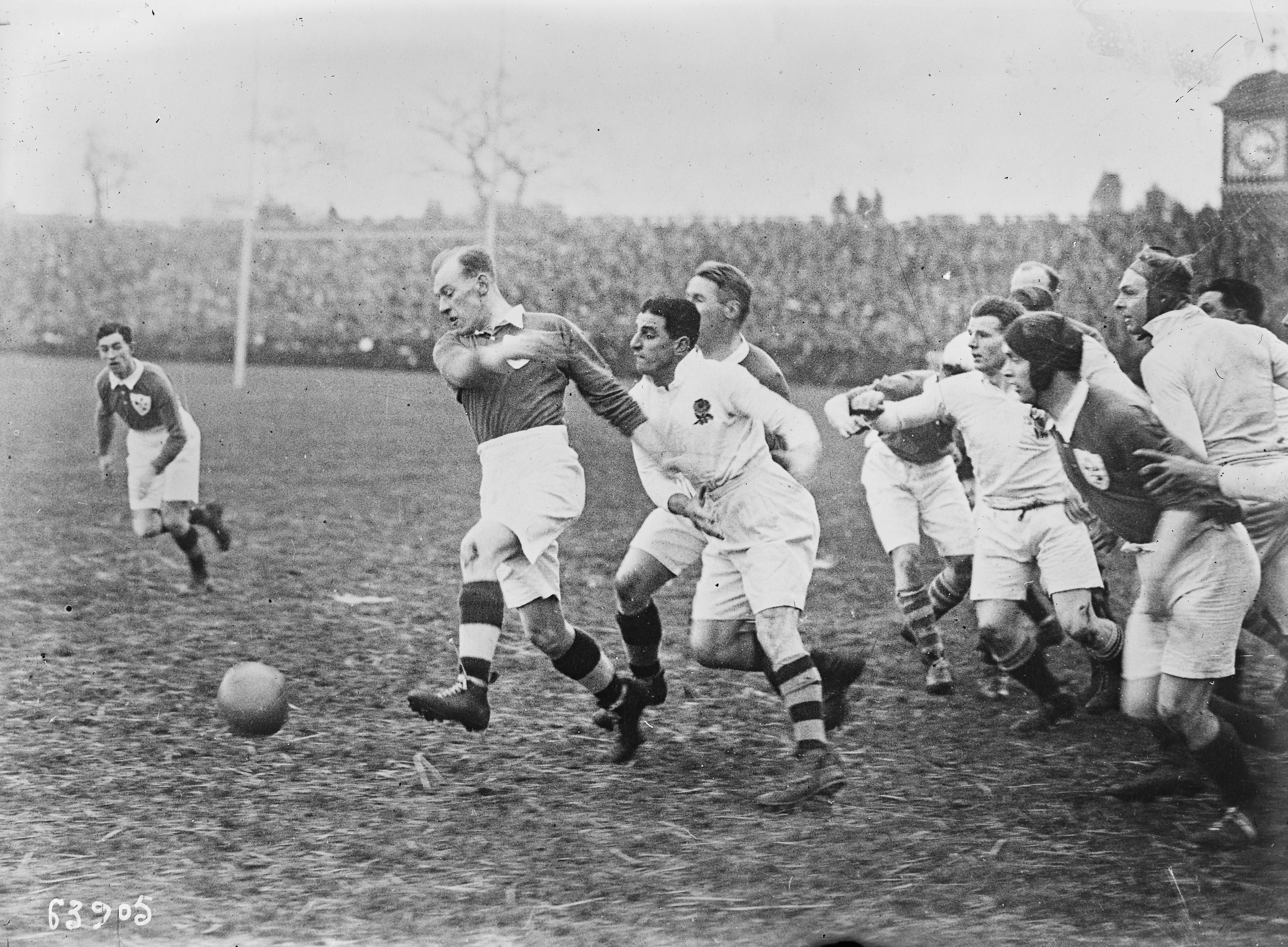
Ireland and England play at Twickenham during the 1921 Five Nations

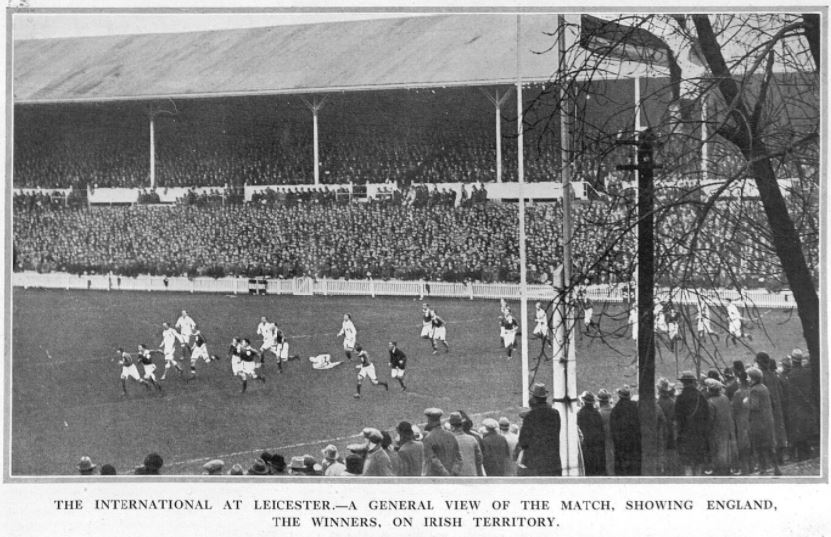
Crumbie Stand view of the England vs Ireland match in Leicester during the 1923 Five Nations.

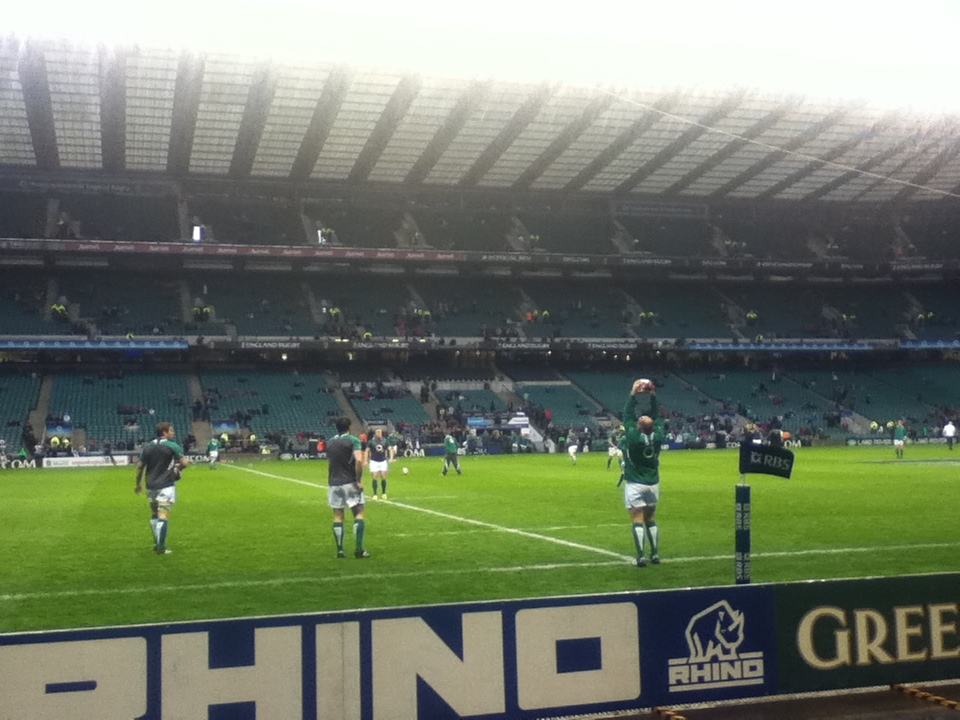
Irish lineout warm up prior to the 2012 Six Nations
