= History of rugby union matches between Scotland and Wales =

Scotland and Wales have played each other at rugby union since 1883. A total of 132 matches have been played, with Wales winning 75 matches, Scotland winning 54 matches and three matches drawn.

Scotland and Wales play each other at least once a year, as both play in the annual Six Nations Championship, and its predecessor competitions.

Since 2018 the winners of the Scotland and Wales match receive the Doddie Weir Cup.

== Summary ==
=== Overall ===
Details	Played	Won by Scotland	Won by Wales	Drawn	Scotland points	Wales points
In Scotland	65	35	27	3	881	804
In Wales	67	19	48	0	633	1,038
Neutral venue	0	0	0	0	0	0
Overall	132	54	75	3	1,514	1,842

=== Records ===
Note: Date shown in brackets indicates when the record was or last set.

Record	Scotland	Wales
Longest winning streak	5 (3 February 1923 – 4 February 1928)	9 (9 February 2008 – 25 February 2017)
Largest points for
Home	35 (2 February 1924; 11 February 2023; 8 March 2025)	51 (15 March 2014)
Away	34 (20 March 1982)	46 (13 March 2005)
Largest winning margin
Home	28 (11 February 2023)	48 (15 March 2014)
Away	16 (20 March 1982)	24 (13 March 2005)

== Results ==
No.	Date	Venue	Score	Winner	Competition
1	8 January 1883	Raeburn Place, Edinburgh	3G–1G	Scotland	1883 Home Nations Championship
2	12 January 1884	Rodney Parade, Newport	0–1G	Scotland	1884 Home Nations Championship
3	10 January 1885	Hamilton Crescent, Glasgow	0–0	draw	1885 Home Nations Championship
4	9 January 1886	National Stadium, Cardiff	0–2G	Scotland	1886 Home Nations Championship
5	26 February 1887	Raeburn Place, Edinburgh	4G–0	Scotland	1887 Home Nations Championship
6	4 February 1888	Rodney Parade, Newport	(1T) 0G–0	Wales	1888 Home Nations Championship
7	2 February 1889	Raeburn Place, Edinburgh	(2T) 0G–0	Scotland	1889 Home Nations Championship
8	1 February 1890	National Stadium, Cardiff	2–8	Scotland	1890 Home Nations Championship
9	7 February 1891	Raeburn Place, Edinburgh	15–0	Scotland	1891 Home Nations Championship
10	6 February 1892	St Helen's, Swansea	2–7	Scotland	1892 Home Nations Championship
11	4 February 1893	Raeburn Place, Edinburgh	0–9	Wales	1893 Home Nations Championship
12	3 February 1894	Rodney Parade, Newport	7–0	Wales	1894 Home Nations Championship
13	26 January 1895	Raeburn Place, Edinburgh	5–4	Scotland	1895 Home Nations Championship
14	25 January 1896	National Stadium, Cardiff	6–0	Wales	1896 Home Nations Championship
15	4 March 1899	Inverleith, Edinburgh	21–10	Scotland	1899 Home Nations Championship
16	27 January 1900	St Helen's, Swansea	12–3	Wales	1900 Home Nations Championship
17	9 February 1901	Inverleith, Edinburgh	18–8	Scotland	1901 Home Nations Championship
18	1 February 1902	National Stadium, Cardiff	14–5	Wales	1902 Home Nations Championship
19	7 February 1903	Inverleith, Edinburgh	6–0	Scotland	1903 Home Nations Championship
20	6 February 1904	St Helen's, Swansea	21–3	Wales	1904 Home Nations Championship
21	4 February 1905	Inverleith, Edinburgh	3–6	Wales	1905 Home Nations Championship
22	3 February 1906	National Stadium, Cardiff	9–3	Wales	1906 Home Nations Championship
23	2 February 1907	Inverleith, Edinburgh	6–3	Scotland	1907 Home Nations Championship
24	1 February 1908	St Helen's, Swansea	6–5	Wales	1908 Home Nations Championship
25	6 February 1909	Inverleith, Edinburgh	3–5	Wales	1909 Home Nations Championship
26	5 February 1910	National Stadium, Cardiff	14–0	Wales	1910 Five Nations Championship
27	4 February 1911	Inverleith, Edinburgh	10–32	Wales	1911 Five Nations Championship
28	3 February 1912	St Helen's, Swansea	21–6	Wales	1912 Five Nations Championship
29	1 February 1913	Inverleith, Edinburgh	0–8	Wales	1913 Five Nations Championship
30	7 February 1914	National Stadium, Cardiff	24–5	Wales	1914 Five Nations Championship
31	7 February 1920	Inverleith, Edinburgh	9–5	Scotland	1920 Five Nations Championship
32	5 February 1921	St Helen's, Swansea	8–14	Scotland	1921 Five Nations Championship
33	4 February 1922	Inverleith, Edinburgh	9–9	draw	1922 Five Nations Championship
34	3 February 1923	National Stadium, Cardiff	8–11	Scotland	1923 Five Nations Championship
35	2 February 1924	Inverleith, Edinburgh	35–10	Scotland	1924 Five Nations Championship
36	7 February 1925	St Helen's, Swansea	14–24	Scotland	1925 Five Nations Championship
37	6 February 1926	Murrayfield Stadium, Edinburgh	8–5	Scotland	1926 Five Nations Championship
38	5 February 1927	National Stadium, Cardiff	0–5	Scotland	1927 Five Nations Championship
39	4 February 1928	Murrayfield Stadium, Edinburgh	0–13	Wales	1928 Five Nations Championship
40	2 February 1929	St Helen's, Swansea	14–7	Wales	1929 Five Nations Championship
41	1 February 1930	Murrayfield Stadium, Edinburgh	12–9	Scotland	1930 Five Nations Championship
42	7 February 1931	National Stadium, Cardiff	13–8	Wales	1931 Five Nations Championship
43	6 February 1932	Murrayfield Stadium, Edinburgh	0–6	Wales	1932 Home Nations Championship
44	4 February 1933	St Helen's, Swansea	3–11	Scotland	1933 Home Nations Championship
45	3 February 1934	Murrayfield Stadium, Edinburgh	6–13	Wales	1934 Home Nations Championship
46	2 February 1935	National Stadium, Cardiff	10–6	Wales	1935 Home Nations Championship
47	1 February 1936	Murrayfield Stadium, Edinburgh	3–13	Wales	1936 Home Nations Championship
48	6 February 1937	St Helen's, Swansea	6–13	Scotland	1937 Home Nations Championship
49	5 February 1938	Murrayfield Stadium, Edinburgh	8–6	Scotland	1938 Home Nations Championship
50	4 February 1939	National Stadium, Cardiff	11–3	Wales	1939 Home Nations Championship
51	1 February 1947	Murrayfield Stadium, Edinburgh	8–22	Wales	1948 Five Nations Championship
52	7 February 1948	National Stadium, Cardiff	14–0	Wales	1948 Five Nations Championship
53	5 February 1949	Murrayfield Stadium, Edinburgh	6–5	Scotland	1949 Five Nations Championship
54	4 February 1950	St Helen's, Swansea	12–0	Wales	1950 Five Nations Championship
55	3 February 1951	Murrayfield Stadium, Edinburgh	19–0	Scotland	1951 Five Nations Championship
56	2 February 1952	National Stadium, Cardiff	11–0	Wales	1952 Five Nations Championship
57	7 February 1953	Murrayfield Stadium, Edinburgh	0–12	Wales	1953 Five Nations Championship
58	10 April 1954	St Helen's, Swansea	15–3	Wales	1954 Five Nations Championship
59	5 February 1955	Murrayfield Stadium, Edinburgh	14–8	Scotland	1955 Five Nations Championship
60	4 February 1956	National Stadium, Cardiff	9–3	Wales	1956 Five Nations Championship
61	2 February 1957	Murrayfield Stadium, Edinburgh	9–6	Scotland	1957 Five Nations Championship
62	1 February 1958	National Stadium, Cardiff	8–3	Wales	1958 Five Nations Championship
63	7 February 1959	Murrayfield Stadium, Edinburgh	6–5	Scotland	1959 Five Nations Championship
64	6 February 1960	National Stadium, Cardiff	8–0	Wales	1960 Five Nations Championship
65	11 February 1961	Murrayfield Stadium, Edinburgh	3–0	Scotland	1961 Five Nations Championship
66	3 February 1962	National Stadium, Cardiff	3–8	Scotland	1962 Five Nations Championship
67	2 February 1963	Murrayfield Stadium, Edinburgh	0–6	Wales	1963 Five Nations Championship
68	1 February 1964	National Stadium, Cardiff	11–3	Wales	1964 Five Nations Championship
69	6 February 1965	Murrayfield Stadium, Edinburgh	12–14	Wales	1965 Five Nations Championship
70	5 February 1966	National Stadium, Cardiff	8–3	Wales	1966 Five Nations Championship
71	4 February 1967	Murrayfield Stadium, Edinburgh	11–5	Scotland	1967 Five Nations Championship
72	3 February 1968	National Stadium, Cardiff	5–0	Wales	1968 Five Nations Championship
73	1 February 1969	Murrayfield Stadium, Edinburgh	3–17	Wales	1969 Five Nations Championship
74	7 February 1970	National Stadium, Cardiff	18–9	Wales	1970 Five Nations Championship
75	6 February 1971	Murrayfield Stadium, Edinburgh	18–19	Wales	1971 Five Nations Championship
76	5 February 1972	National Stadium, Cardiff	35–12	Wales	1972 Five Nations Championship
77	3 February 1973	Murrayfield Stadium, Edinburgh	10–9	Scotland	1973 Five Nations Championship
78	19 January 1974	National Stadium, Cardiff	6–0	Wales	1974 Five Nations Championship
79	1 March 1975	Murrayfield Stadium, Edinburgh	12–10	Scotland	1975 Five Nations Championship
80	7 February 1976	National Stadium, Cardiff	28–6	Wales	1976 Five Nations Championship
81	19 March 1977	Murrayfield Stadium, Edinburgh	9–18	Wales	1977 Five Nations Championship
82	18 February 1978	National Stadium, Cardiff	22–14	Wales	1978 Five Nations Championship
83	20 January 1979	Murrayfield Stadium, Edinburgh	13–19	Wales	1979 Five Nations Championship
84	1 March 1980	National Stadium, Cardiff	17–6	Wales	1980 Five Nations Championship
85	7 February 1981	Murrayfield Stadium, Edinburgh	15–6	Scotland	1981 Five Nations Championship
86	20 March 1982	National Stadium, Cardiff	18–34	Scotland	1982 Five Nations Championship
87	19 February 1983	Murrayfield Stadium, Edinburgh	15–19	Wales	1983 Five Nations Championship
88	21 January 1984	National Stadium, Cardiff	9–15	Scotland	1984 Five Nations Championship
89	2 March 1985	Murrayfield Stadium, Edinburgh	21–25	Wales	1985 Five Nations Championship
90	1 February 1986	National Stadium, Cardiff	22–15	Wales	1986 Five Nations Championship
91	21 March 1987	Murrayfield Stadium, Edinburgh	21–15	Scotland	1987 Five Nations Championship
92	20 February 1988	National Stadium, Cardiff	25–20	Wales	1988 Five Nations Championship
93	21 January 1989	Murrayfield Stadium, Edinburgh	23–7	Scotland	1989 Five Nations Championship
94	3 March 1990	National Stadium, Cardiff	9–13	Scotland	1990 Five Nations Championship
95	2 February 1991	Murrayfield Stadium, Edinburgh	32–12	Scotland	1991 Five Nations Championship
96	21 March 1992	National Stadium, Cardiff	15–12	Wales	1992 Five Nations Championship
97	20 February 1993	Murrayfield Stadium, Edinburgh	20–0	Scotland	1993 Five Nations Championship
98	15 January 1994	National Stadium, Cardiff	29–6	Wales	1994 Five Nations Championship
99	4 March 1995	Murrayfield Stadium, Edinburgh	26–13	Scotland	1995 Five Nations Championship
100	17 February 1996	National Stadium, Cardiff	14–16	Scotland	1996 Five Nations Championship
101	18 January 1997	Murrayfield Stadium, Edinburgh	19–34	Wales	1997 Five Nations Championship
102	7 March 1998	Wembley Stadium, London, England	19–13	Wales	1998 Five Nations Championship
103	6 February 1999	Murrayfield Stadium, Edinburgh	33–20	Scotland	1999 Five Nations Championship
104	18 March 2000	Millennium Stadium, Cardiff	26–18	Wales	2000 Six Nations Championship
105	17 February 2001	Murrayfield Stadium, Edinburgh	28–28	draw	2001 Six Nations Championship
106	6 April 2002	Millennium Stadium, Cardiff	22–27	Scotland	2002 Six Nations Championship
107	8 March 2003	Murrayfield Stadium, Edinburgh	30–22	Scotland	2003 Six Nations Championship
108	30 August 2003	Millennium Stadium, Cardiff	23–9	Wales	2003 Rugby World Cup warm-up match
109	14 February 2004	Millennium Stadium, Cardiff	23–10	Wales	2004 Six Nations Championship
110	13 March 2005	Murrayfield Stadium, Edinburgh	22–46	Wales	2005 Six Nations Championship
111	12 February 2006	Millennium Stadium, Cardiff	28–18	Wales	2006 Six Nations Championship
112	10 February 2007	Murrayfield Stadium, Edinburgh	21–9	Scotland	2007 Six Nations Championship
113	9 February 2008	Millennium Stadium, Cardiff	30–15	Wales	2008 Six Nations Championship
114	8 February 2009	Murrayfield Stadium, Edinburgh	13–26	Wales	2009 Six Nations Championship
115	13 February 2010	Millennium Stadium, Cardiff	31–24	Wales	2010 Six Nations Championship
116	12 February 2011	Murrayfield Stadium, Edinburgh	6–24	Wales	2011 Six Nations Championship
117	12 February 2012	Millennium Stadium, Cardiff	27–13	Wales	2012 Six Nations Championship
118	9 March 2013	Murrayfield Stadium, Edinburgh	18–28	Wales	2013 Six Nations Championship
119	15 March 2014	Millennium Stadium, Cardiff	51–3	Wales	2014 Six Nations Championship
120	15 February 2015	Murrayfield Stadium, Edinburgh	23–26	Wales	2015 Six Nations Championship
121	13 February 2016	Millennium Stadium, Cardiff	27–23	Wales	2016 Six Nations Championship
122	25 February 2017	Murrayfield Stadium, Edinburgh	29–13	Scotland	2017 Six Nations Championship
123	3 February 2018	Millennium Stadium, Cardiff	34–7	Wales	2018 Six Nations Championship
124	3 November 2018	Millennium Stadium, Cardiff	21–10	Wales	2018 Autumn international
125	9 March 2019	Murrayfield Stadium, Edinburgh	11–18	Wales	2019 Six Nations Championship
126	31 October 2020	Parc y Scarlets, Llanelli	10–14	Scotland	2020 Six Nations Championship
127	13 February 2021	Murrayfield Stadium, Edinburgh	24–25	Wales	2021 Six Nations Championship
128	12 February 2022	Millennium Stadium, Cardiff	20–17	Wales	2022 Six Nations Championship
129	11 February 2023	Murrayfield Stadium, Edinburgh	35–7	Scotland	2023 Six Nations Championship
130	3 February 2024	Millennium Stadium, Cardiff	26–27	Scotland	2024 Six Nations Championship
131	8 March 2025	Murrayfield Stadium, Edinburgh	35-29	Scotland	2025 Six Nations Championship
132	21 February 2026	Millennium Stadium, Cardiff	23-26	Scotland	2026 Six Nations Championship
