= History of rugby union matches between Ireland and Scotland =

Ireland and Scotland have played each other at rugby union in 144 matches, with Ireland winning 73 times, Scotland winning 66 times and five matches drawn. Since 1989, the teams have competed for the Centenary Quaich during the Six Nations Championship.

== Summary ==
=== Overall ===
Details	Played	Won by Ireland	Won by Scotland	Drawn	Ireland points	Scotland points
In Ireland	70	40	26	4	893	681
In Scotland	72	31	40	1	871	863
Neutral venue	2	2	0	0	63	17
Overall	144	73	66	5	1,827	1,561

=== Records ===
Note: Date shown in brackets indicates when the record was or last set.

Record	Ireland	Scotland
Longest winning streak	12 (10 Mar 2017–present)	11 (18 Feb 1882–18 Feb 1893)
Largest points for
Home	44 (19 February 2000)	38 (1 March 1997)
Away	40 (21 March 2015)	32 (3 March 1984)
Neutral	36 (7 October 2023)	14 (7 October 2023)
Largest winning margin
Home	22 (14 March 2026)	28 (1 March 1997)
Away	30 (21 March 2015)	23 (3 March 1984)
Neutral	24 (22 September 2019)	—N/a

=== Attendance ===
Up to date as of 14 March 2026

Total attendance*	2,163,250
Average attendance*	52,762
Highest attendance	80,313; Ireland 20–23 Scotland; 20 March 2010
*Excludes 101 matches in which no attendance was reported and two matches in which Covid restricted attendance

== Results ==
No.	Date	Venue	Score	Winner	Competition	Attendance	Report
1	19 February 1877	Ormeau Cricket Ground, Belfast	0–6G	Scotland	1876–77 Home Nations rugby union matches		
2	17 February 1879	Ormeau Cricket Ground, Belfast	0–2G	Scotland	1878–79 Home Nations rugby union matches		
3	14 February 1880	Hamilton Crescent, Glasgow	3G–0	Scotland	1879–80 Home Nations rugby union matches		
4	19 February 1881	Ormeau Cricket Ground, Belfast	1G–0	Ireland	1880–81 Home Nations rugby union matches		
5	18 February 1882	Hamilton Crescent, Glasgow	(2T) 0G–0	Scotland	1881–82 Home Nations rugby union matches		
6	17 February 1883	Ormeau Cricket Ground, Belfast	0–1G	Scotland	1883 Home Nations Championship		
7	16 February 1884	Hamilton Crescent, Glasgow	2G–0	Scotland	1884 Home Nations Championship	8,000	
–	21 February 1885	Ormeau Cricket Ground, Belfast	0–0G	Abandoned ^{1}	1885 Home Nations Championship		
8	7 March 1885	Raeburn Place, Edinburgh	1G–0	Scotland	1885 Home Nations Championship		
9	20 February 1886	Raeburn Place, Edinburgh	4G–0	Scotland	1886 Home Nations Championship		
10	19 February 1887	Ormeau Cricket Ground, Belfast	0–2G	Scotland	1887 Home Nations Championship		
11	10 March 1888	Raeburn Place, Edinburgh	1G–0	Scotland	1888 Home Nations Championship		
12	16 February 1889	Ormeau Cricket Ground, Belfast	0–1G	Scotland	1889 Home Nations Championship		
13	22 February 1890	Raeburn Place, Edinburgh	5–0	Scotland	1890 Home Nations Championship		
14	21 February 1891	Ormeau Cricket Ground, Belfast	0–14	Scotland	1891 Home Nations Championship		
15	20 February 1892	Raeburn Place, Edinburgh	2–0	Scotland	1892 Home Nations Championship		
16	18 February 1893	Ormeau Cricket Ground, Belfast	0–0	Draw	1893 Home Nations Championship		
17	24 February 1894	Lansdowne Road, Dublin	5–0	Ireland	1894 Home Nations Championship		
18	2 March 1895	Raeburn Place, Edinburgh	6–0	Scotland	1895 Home Nations Championship		
19	15 February 1896	Lansdowne Road, Dublin	0–0	Draw	1896 Home Nations Championship		
20	20 February 1897	Powderhall Stadium, Edinburgh	8–3	Scotland	1897 Home Nations Championship		
21	19 February 1898	Lansdowne Road, Dublin	0–8	Scotland	1898 Home Nations Championship	12,000	
22	18 February 1899	Inverleith, Edinburgh	3–9	Ireland	1899 Home Nations Championship		
23	24 February 1900	Lansdowne Road, Dublin	0–0	Draw	1900 Home Nations Championship		
24	23 February 1901	Inverleith, Edinburgh	9–5	Scotland	1901 Home Nations Championship		
25	22 February 1902	Balmoral Showgrounds, Belfast	5–0	Ireland	1902 Home Nations Championship		
26	28 February 1903	Inverleith, Edinburgh	3–0	Scotland	1903 Home Nations Championship		
27	27 February 1904	Lansdowne Road, Dublin	3–19	Scotland	1904 Home Nations Championship		
28	25 February 1905	Inverleith, Edinburgh	5–11	Ireland	1905 Home Nations Championship		
29	24 February 1906	Lansdowne Road, Dublin	6–13	Scotland	1906 Home Nations Championship		
30	23 February 1907	Inverleith, Edinburgh	15–3	Scotland	1907 Home Nations Championship		
31	29 February 1908	Lansdowne Road, Dublin	16–11	Ireland	1908 Home Nations Championship		
32	27 February 1909	Inverleith, Edinburgh	9–3	Scotland	1909 Home Nations Championship		
33	26 February 1910	Balmoral Showgrounds, Belfast	0–14	Scotland	1910 Five Nations Championship	12,000	
34	25 February 1911	Inverleith, Edinburgh	10–16	Ireland	1911 Five Nations Championship		
35	24 February 1912	Lansdowne Road, Dublin	10–8	Ireland	1912 Five Nations Championship		
36	22 February 1913	Inverleith, Edinburgh	29–14	Scotland	1913 Five Nations Championship		
37	28 February 1914	Lansdowne Road, Dublin	6–0	Ireland	1914 Five Nations Championship		
38	28 February 1920	Inverleith, Edinburgh	19–0	Scotland	1920 Five Nations Championship		
39	26 February 1921	Lansdowne Road, Dublin	9–8	Ireland	1921 Five Nations Championship		
40	25 February 1922	Inverleith, Edinburgh	6–3	Scotland	1922 Five Nations Championship		
41	24 February 1923	Lansdowne Road, Dublin	3–13	Scotland	1923 Five Nations Championship		
42	23 February 1924	Inverleith, Edinburgh	13–8	Scotland	1924 Five Nations Championship		
43	28 February 1925	Lansdowne Road, Dublin	8–14	Scotland	1925 Five Nations Championship		
44	27 February 1926	Murrayfield Stadium, Edinburgh	0–3	Ireland	1926 Five Nations Championship		
45	26 February 1927	Lansdowne Road, Dublin	6–0	Ireland	1927 Five Nations Championship	40,000	
46	25 February 1928	Murrayfield Stadium, Edinburgh	5–13	Ireland	1928 Five Nations Championship		
47	23 February 1929	Lansdowne Road, Dublin	7–16	Scotland	1929 Five Nations Championship	40,000	
48	22 February 1930	Murrayfield Stadium, Edinburgh	11–14	Ireland	1930 Five Nations Championship		
49	28 February 1931	Lansdowne Road, Dublin	8–5	Ireland	1931 Five Nations Championship		
50	27 February 1932	Murrayfield Stadium, Edinburgh	8–20	Ireland	1932 Home Nations Championship		
51	1 April 1933	Lansdowne Road, Dublin	6–8	Scotland	1933 Home Nations Championship		
52	24 February 1934	Murrayfield Stadium, Edinburgh	16–9	Scotland	1934 Home Nations Championship		
53	23 February 1935	Lansdowne Road, Dublin	12–5	Ireland	1935 Home Nations Championship		
54	22 February 1936	Murrayfield Stadium, Edinburgh	4–10	Ireland	1936 Home Nations Championship		
55	27 February 1937	Lansdowne Road, Dublin	11–4	Ireland	1937 Home Nations Championship		
56	26 February 1938	Murrayfield Stadium, Edinburgh	23–14	Scotland	1938 Home Nations Championship		
57	25 February 1939	Lansdowne Road, Dublin	12–3	Ireland	1939 Home Nations Championship		
58	22 February 1947	Murrayfield Stadium, Edinburgh	0–3	Ireland	1947 Five Nations Championship		
59	28 February 1948	Lansdowne Road, Dublin	6–0	Ireland	1948 Five Nations Championship		
60	26 February 1949	Murrayfield Stadium, Edinburgh	3–13	Ireland	1949 Five Nations Championship		
61	25 February 1950	Lansdowne Road, Dublin	21–0	Ireland	1950 Five Nations Championship		
62	24 February 1951	Murrayfield Stadium, Edinburgh	5–6	Ireland	1951 Five Nations Championship		
63	2 February 1952	Lansdowne Road, Dublin	12–8	Ireland	1952 Five Nations Championship		
64	28 February 1953	Murrayfield Stadium, Edinburgh	8–26	Ireland	1953 Five Nations Championship		
65	27 February 1954	Lansdowne Road, Dublin	6–0	Ireland	1954 Five Nations Championship		
66	26 February 1955	Murrayfield Stadium, Edinburgh	12–3	Scotland	1955 Five Nations Championship		
67	25 February 1956	Lansdowne Road, Dublin	14–10	Ireland	1956 Five Nations Championship		
68	23 February 1957	Murrayfield Stadium, Edinburgh	3–5	Ireland	1957 Five Nations Championship		
69	1 March 1958	Lansdowne Road, Dublin	12–6	Ireland	1958 Five Nations Championship		
70	28 February 1959	Murrayfield Stadium, Edinburgh	3–8	Ireland	1959 Five Nations Championship		
71	27 February 1960	Lansdowne Road, Dublin	5–6	Scotland	1960 Five Nations Championship		
72	25 February 1961	Murrayfield Stadium, Edinburgh	16–8	Scotland	1961 Five Nations Championship		
73	24 February 1962	Lansdowne Road, Dublin	6–20	Scotland	1962 Five Nations Championship		
74	2 February 1963	Murrayfield Stadium, Edinburgh	3–0	Scotland	1963 Five Nations Championship		
75	22 February 1964	Lansdowne Road, Dublin	3–6	Scotland	1964 Five Nations Championship		
76	27 February 1965	Murrayfield Stadium, Edinburgh	6–16	Ireland	1965 Five Nations Championship		
77	26 February 1966	Lansdowne Road, Dublin	3–11	Scotland	1966 Five Nations Championship		
78	25 February 1967	Murrayfield Stadium, Edinburgh	3–5	Ireland	1967 Five Nations Championship		
79	24 February 1968	Lansdowne Road, Dublin	14–6	Ireland	1968 Five Nations Championship		
80	22 February 1969	Murrayfield Stadium, Edinburgh	0–16	Ireland	1969 Five Nations Championship		
81	28 February 1970	Lansdowne Road, Dublin	16–11	Ireland	1970 Five Nations Championship		
82	27 February 1971	Murrayfield Stadium, Edinburgh	5–17	Ireland	1971 Five Nations Championship		
83	24 February 1973	Murrayfield Stadium, Edinburgh	19–14	Scotland	1973 Five Nations Championship		
84	2 March 1974	Lansdowne Road, Dublin	9–6	Ireland	1974 Five Nations Championship		
85	1 February 1975	Murrayfield Stadium, Edinburgh	20–13	Scotland	1975 Five Nations Championship		
86	20 March 1976	Lansdowne Road, Dublin	6–15	Scotland	1976 Five Nations Championship		
87	19 February 1977	Murrayfield Stadium, Edinburgh	21–18	Scotland	1977 Five Nations Championship		
88	21 January 1978	Lansdowne Road, Dublin	12–9	Ireland	1978 Five Nations Championship		
89	3 March 1979	Murrayfield Stadium, Edinburgh	11–11	Draw	1979 Five Nations Championship		
90	2 February 1980	Lansdowne Road, Dublin	22–15	Ireland	1980 Five Nations Championship		
91	21 March 1981	Murrayfield Stadium, Edinburgh	10–9	Scotland	1981 Five Nations Championship		
92	20 February 1982	Lansdowne Road, Dublin	21–12	Ireland	1982 Five Nations Championship		
93	15 January 1983	Murrayfield Stadium, Edinburgh	13–15	Ireland	1983 Five Nations Championship		
94	3 March 1984	Lansdowne Road, Dublin	9–32	Scotland	1984 Five Nations Championship		
95	2 February 1985	Murrayfield Stadium, Edinburgh	15–18	Ireland	1985 Five Nations Championship		
96	15 March 1986	Lansdowne Road, Dublin	9–10	Scotland	1986 Five Nations Championship		
97	21 February 1987	Murrayfield Stadium, Edinburgh	16–12	Scotland	1987 Five Nations Championship		
98	16 January 1988	Lansdowne Road, Dublin	22–18	Ireland	1988 Five Nations Championship		
99	4 March 1989	Murrayfield Stadium, Edinburgh	37–21	Scotland	1989 Five Nations Championship		
100	3 February 1990	Lansdowne Road, Dublin	10–13	Scotland	1990 Five Nations Championship		
101	16 March 1991	Murrayfield Stadium, Edinburgh	28–25	Scotland	1991 Five Nations Championship		
102	12 October 1991	Murrayfield Stadium, Edinburgh	24–15	Scotland	1991 Rugby World Cup	60,000	
103	15 February 1992	Lansdowne Road, Dublin	10–18	Scotland	1992 Five Nations Championship		
104	16 January 1993	Murrayfield Stadium, Edinburgh	15–3	Scotland	1993 Five Nations Championship		
105	5 March 1994	Lansdowne Road, Dublin	6–6	Draw	1994 Five Nations Championship		
106	4 February 1995	Murrayfield Stadium, Edinburgh	26–13	Scotland	1995 Five Nations Championship		
107	20 January 1996	Lansdowne Road, Dublin	10–16	Scotland	1996 Five Nations Championship		
108	1 March 1997	Murrayfield Stadium, Edinburgh	38–10	Scotland	1997 Five Nations Championship	67,500	
109	7 February 1998	Lansdowne Road, Dublin	16–17	Scotland	1998 Five Nations Championship	55,000	
110	20 March 1999	Murrayfield Stadium, Edinburgh	30–13	Scotland	1999 Five Nations Championship	67,500	
111	19 February 2000	Lansdowne Road, Dublin	44–22	Ireland	2000 Six Nations Championship	40,000	
112	22 September 2001	Murrayfield Stadium, Edinburgh	32–10	Scotland	2001 Six Nations Championship	67,500	
113	2 March 2002	Lansdowne Road, Dublin	43–22	Ireland	2002 Six Nations Championship	49,000	
114	16 February 2003	Murrayfield Stadium, Edinburgh	6–36	Ireland	2003 Six Nations Championship	67,500	
115	6 September 2003	Murrayfield Stadium, Edinburgh	10–29	Ireland	2003 Rugby World Cup warm-up tests	35,264	
116	27 March 2004	Lansdowne Road, Dublin	37–16	Ireland	2004 Six Nations Championship	42,750	
117	12 February 2005	Murrayfield Stadium, Edinburgh	13–40	Ireland	2005 Six Nations Championship	68,000	
118	11 March 2006	Lansdowne Road, Dublin	15–9	Ireland	2006 Six Nations Championship	49,500	
119	10 March 2007	Murrayfield Stadium, Edinburgh	18–19	Ireland	2007 Six Nations Championship	67,500	
120	11 August 2007	Murrayfield Stadium, Edinburgh	31–21	Scotland	2007 Rugby World Cup warm-up tests	25,127	
121	23 February 2008	Croke Park, Dublin	34–13	Ireland	2008 Six Nations Championship	74,234	
122	14 March 2009	Murrayfield Stadium, Edinburgh	15–22	Ireland	2009 Six Nations Championship	55,000	
123	20 March 2010	Croke Park, Dublin	20–23	Scotland	2010 Six Nations Championship	80,313	
124	27 February 2011	Murrayfield Stadium, Edinburgh	18–21	Ireland	2011 Six Nations Championship	63,082	
125	6 August 2011	Murrayfield Stadium, Edinburgh	10–6	Scotland	2011 Rugby World Cup warm-up tests	28,288	
126	10 March 2012	Aviva Stadium, Dublin	32–14	Ireland	2012 Six Nations Championship	51,000	
127	24 February 2013	Murrayfield Stadium, Edinburgh	12–8	Scotland	2013 Six Nations Championship	67,006	
128	2 February 2014	Aviva Stadium, Dublin	28–6	Ireland	2014 Six Nations Championship	51,000	
129	21 March 2015	Murrayfield Stadium, Edinburgh	10–40	Ireland	2015 Six Nations Championship	67,144	
130	15 August 2015	Aviva Stadium, Dublin	28–22	Ireland	2015 Rugby World Cup warm-up tests	31,780	
131	19 March 2016	Aviva Stadium, Dublin	35–25	Ireland	2016 Six Nations Championship	51,700	
132	4 February 2017	Murrayfield Stadium, Edinburgh	27–22	Scotland	2017 Six Nations Championship	67,144	
133	10 March 2018	Aviva Stadium, Dublin	28–8	Ireland	2018 Six Nations Championship	51,700	
134	9 February 2019	Murrayfield Stadium, Edinburgh	13–22	Ireland	2019 Six Nations Championship	67,140	
135	22 September 2019	International Stadium Yokohama, Yokohama, Japan	27–3	Ireland	2019 Rugby World Cup	63,731	
136	1 February 2020	Aviva Stadium, Dublin	19–12	Ireland	2020 Six Nations Championship	51,700	
137	5 December 2020	Aviva Stadium, Dublin	31–16	Ireland	Autumn Nations Cup	0*	
138	14 March 2021	Murrayfield Stadium, Edinburgh	24–27	Ireland	2021 Six Nations Championship	0*	
139	19 March 2022	Aviva Stadium, Dublin	26–5	Ireland	2022 Six Nations Championship	51,000	
140	12 March 2023	Murrayfield Stadium, Edinburgh	7–22	Ireland	2023 Six Nations Championship	67,144	
141	7 October 2023	Stade de France, Paris	36–14	Ireland	2023 Rugby World Cup	78,459	
142	16 March 2024	Aviva Stadium, Dublin	17–13	Ireland	2024 Six Nations Championship	51,700	
143	9 February 2025	Murrayfield Stadium, Edinburgh	18–32	Ireland	2025 Six Nations Championship	67,144	
144	14 March 2026	Aviva Stadium, Dublin	43–21	Ireland	2026 Six Nations Championship	51,700	
^{*}Denotes match in which Covid-19 restrictions limited attendance

=== Notes ===
^1 The match was abandoned after 20 minutes due to bad weather, with the scores level on goals and Scotland ahead on tries. As such this is not counted as a test match. The game was replayed on 7 March 1885 in Scotland.

== Results by Decade ==
Decade	Ireland	Scotland	Drawn	Series winner
1870s	0	2	0	Scotland
1880s	1	9	0	Scotland
1890s	2	6	2	Scotland
1900s	3	6	1	Scotland
1910s	3	2	0	Ireland
1920s	4	6	0	Scotland
1930s	7	3	0	Ireland
1940s	3	0	0	Ireland
1950s	9	1	0	Ireland
1960s	4	6	0	Scotland
1970s	4	4	1	Drawn
1980s	5	5	0	Drawn
1990s	0	10	1	Scotland
2000s	10	2	0	Ireland
2010s	9	4	0	Ireland
2020s	9	0	0	Ireland
Overall	73	66	5	Ireland

== Gallery ==
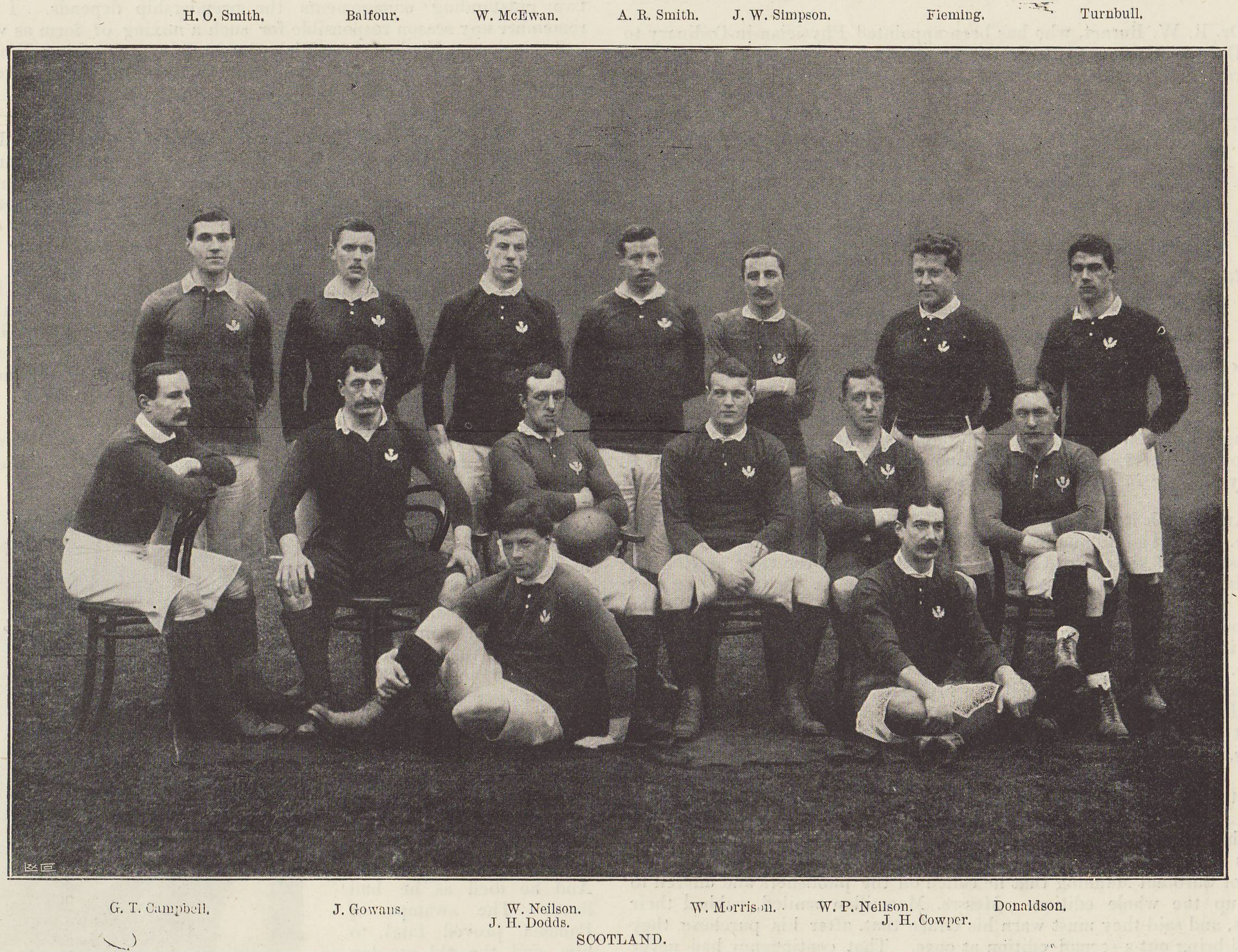
Scottish team photo on 15 February 1896, prior to the 1896 Home Nations Championship encounter with Ireland at Lansdowne Road

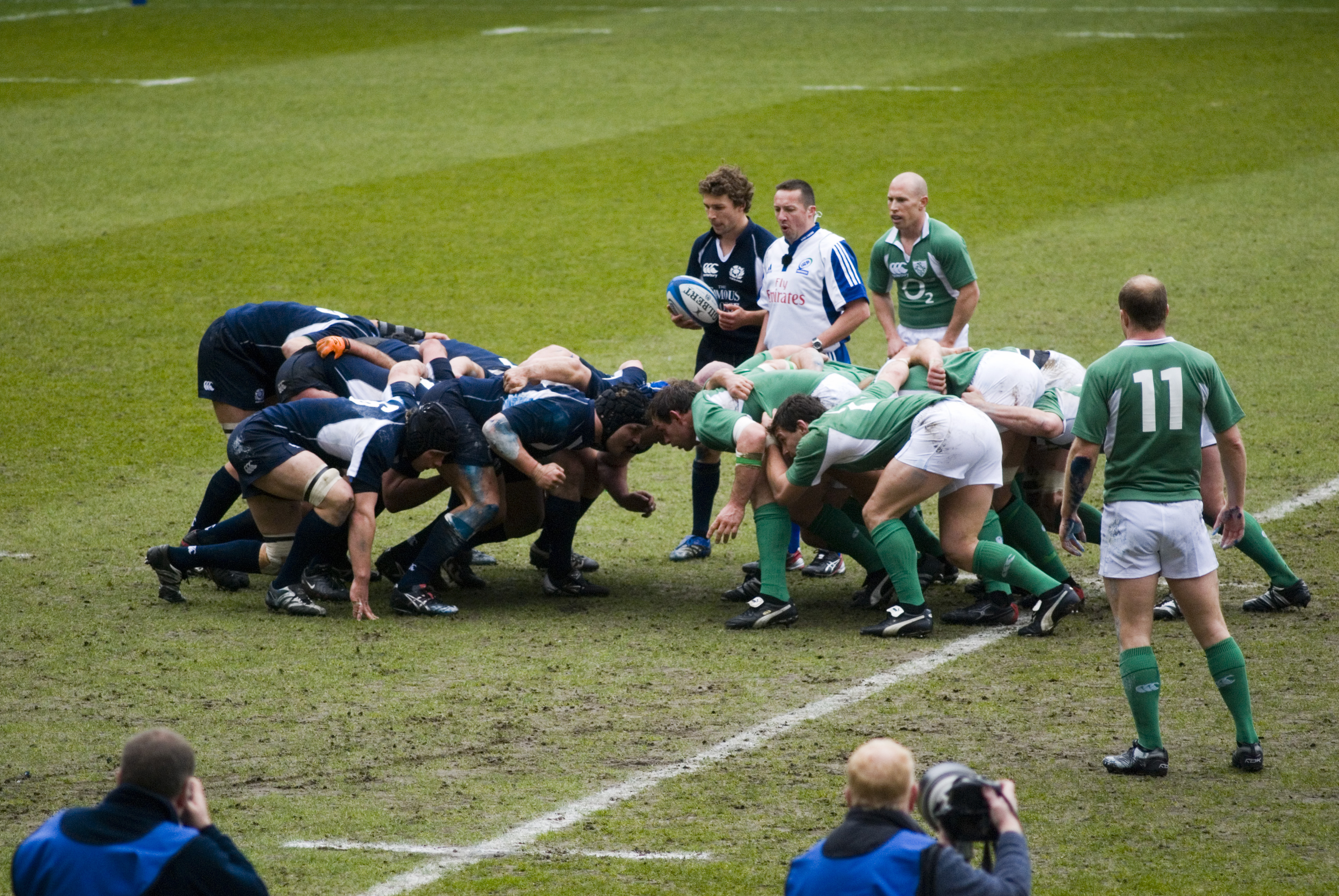
An Irish-Scottish scrum during the 2007 Six Nations

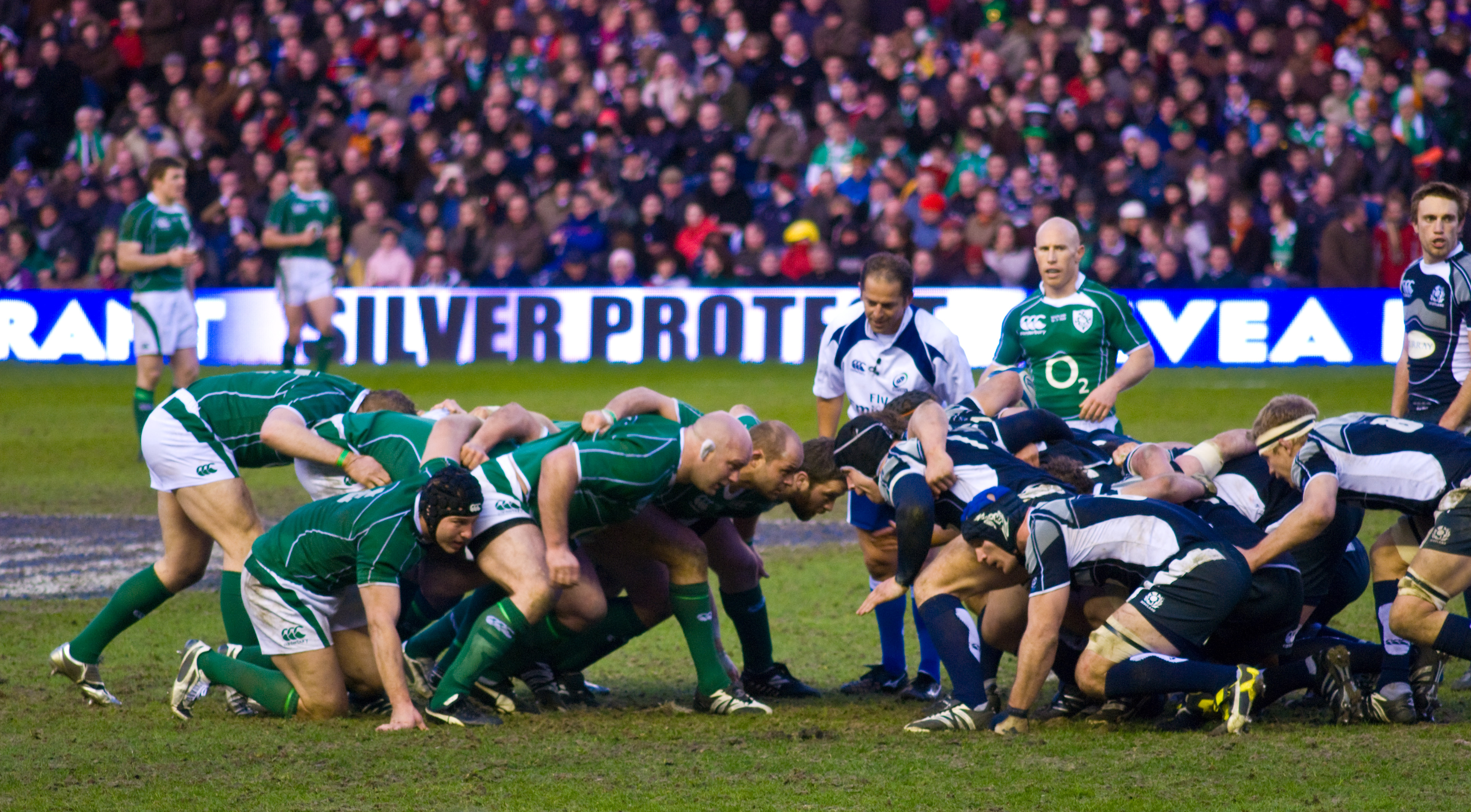
An Irish-Scottish scrum during the 2009 Six Nations

== See also ==
- Centenary Quaich
