= History of rugby union matches between England and Wales =

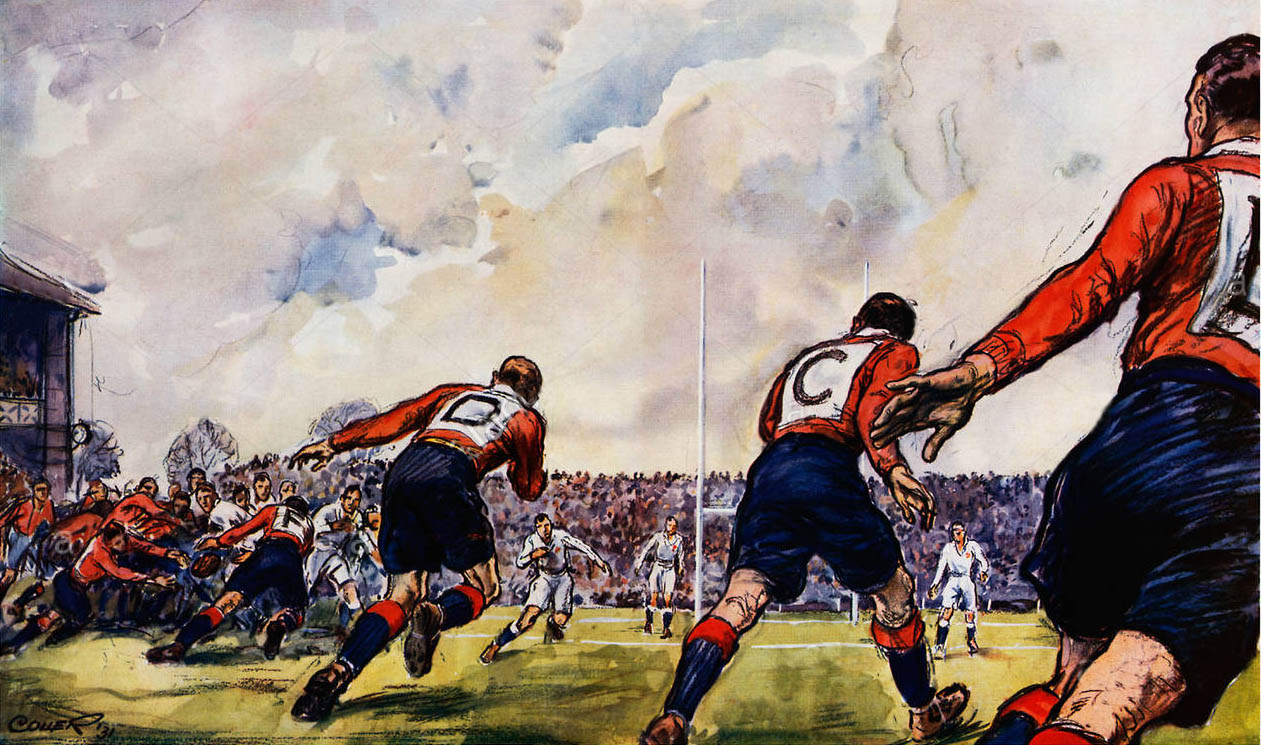
Starting An Attack, a painting of the England v Wales rugby match at Twickenham Stadium in 1931

England and Wales have played each other at rugby union since 1881. A total of 144 matches have been played, with England having won 71 times, Wales having won 61 times and 12 matches having been drawn. There is a considerable rivalry between the sides due to the proximity of the two nations and the history between them.

Apart from their annual match, currently part of the Six Nations Championship, the teams have also met in eight warm-up matches prior to the 2003, 2007, 2011, 2019 and 2023 World Cups, with England winning on five occasions and Wales three, and a one-off match in May 2016 as a warm-up match prior to each country's summer tour to the Southern Hemisphere.

== Summary ==
=== Overall ===
Details	Played	Won by England	Won by Wales	Drawn	England points	Wales points
In England	73	45	20	8	1,208	787
In Wales	69	25	40	4	803	984
Neutral venue	2	1	1	0	31	33
Overall	144	71	61	12	2,042	1,804

=== Records ===
Note: Date shown in brackets indicates when the record was last set.

Record	England	Wales
Longest winning streak	7 (4 March 2000 – 20 March 2004)	5 (15 February 1975 – 17 March 1979)
Largest points for
Home	62 (4 August 2007)	40 (27 February 2021)
Away	68 (15 March 2025)	30 (7 March 2020)
Largest winning margin
Home	57 (4 August 2007)	27 (16 March 2013)
Away	54 (15 March 2025)	13 (13 January 1906; 8 June 1987)

== Results ==
No.	Date	Venue	Score	Winner	Competition	Ref.
1	19 February 1881	Richardson's Field, Blackheath	(6T) 8G–0G (0)	England	1880–81 Home Nations International	
2	16 December 1882	St Helen's, Swansea	(0) 0G–2G (4T)	England	1883 Home Nations Championship	
3	5 January 1884	Cardigan Fields, Leeds	(2T) 1G–1G (0)	England	1884 Home Nations Championship	
4	3 January 1885	St Helen's, Swansea	(1T) 1G–1G (4T)	England	1885 Home Nations Championship	
5	2 January 1886	Rectory Field, Blackheath	(2T) 1G–1G (0)	England	1886 Home Nations Championship	
6	8 January 1887	Stradey Park, Llanelli	(0) 0G–0G (0)	draw	1887 Home Nations Championship	
7	15 February 1890	Crown Flatt, Dewsbury	0–1	Wales	1890 Home Nations Championship	
8	3 January 1891	Rodney Parade, Newport	3–7	England	1891 Home Nations Championship	
9	2 January 1892	Rectory Field, Blackheath	17–0	England	1892 Home Nations Championship	
10	7 January 1893	Cardiff Arms Park, Cardiff	12–11	Wales	1893 Home Nations Championship	
11	4 January 1894	Upper Park, Birkenhead	24–3	England	1894 Home Nations Championship	
12	5 January 1895	St Helen's, Swansea	6–14	England	1895 Home Nations Championship	
13	4 January 1896	Rectory Field, Blackheath	25–0	England	1896 Home Nations Championship	
14	9 January 1897	Rodney Parade, Newport	11–0	Wales	1897 Home Nations Championship	
15	2 April 1898	Rectory Field, Blackheath	14–7	England	1898 Home Nations Championship	
16	7 January 1899	St Helen's, Swansea	26–3	Wales	1899 Home Nations Championship	
17	6 January 1900	Kingsholm, Gloucester	3–13	Wales	1900 Home Nations Championship	
18	5 January 1901	Cardiff Arms Park, Cardiff	13–0	Wales	1901 Home Nations Championship	
19	11 January 1902	Rectory Field, Blackheath	8–9	Wales	1902 Home Nations Championship	
20	10 January 1903	St Helen's, Swansea	21–5	Wales	1903 Home Nations Championship	
21	9 January 1904	Welford Road, Leicester	14–14	draw	1904 Home Nations Championship	
22	14 January 1905	Cardiff Arms Park, Cardiff	25–0	Wales	1905 Home Nations Championship	
23	13 January 1906	Athletic Ground, Richmond	3–16	Wales	1906 Home Nations Championship	
24	12 January 1907	St Helen's, Swansea	22–0	Wales	1907 Home Nations Championship	
25	18 January 1908	Ashton Gate, Bristol	18–28	Wales	1908 Home Nations Championship	
26	16 January 1909	Cardiff Arms Park, Cardiff	8–0	Wales	1909 Home Nations Championship	
27	15 January 1910	Twickenham Stadium, London	11–6	England	1910 Five Nations Championship	
28	21 January 1911	St Helen's, Swansea	15–11	Wales	1911 Five Nations Championship	
29	20 January 1912	Twickenham Stadium, London	8–0	England	1912 Five Nations Championship	
30	18 January 1913	Cardiff Arms Park, Cardiff	0–12	England	1913 Five Nations Championship	
31	17 January 1914	Twickenham Stadium, London	10–9	England	1914 Five Nations Championship	
32	17 January 1920	St Helen's, Swansea	19–5	Wales	1920 Five Nations Championship	
33	15 January 1921	Twickenham Stadium, London	18–3	England	1921 Five Nations Championship	
34	21 January 1922	Cardiff Arms Park, Cardiff	28–6	Wales	1922 Five Nations Championship	
35	20 January 1923	Twickenham Stadium, London	7–3	England	1923 Five Nations Championship	
36	19 January 1924	St Helen's, Swansea	9–17	England	1924 Five Nations Championship	
37	17 January 1925	Twickenham Stadium, London	12–6	England	1925 Five Nations Championship	
38	16 January 1926	Cardiff Arms Park, Cardiff	3–3	draw	1926 Five Nations Championship	
39	15 January 1927	Twickenham Stadium, London	11–9	England	1927 Five Nations Championship	
40	21 January 1928	St Helen's, Swansea	8–10	England	1928 Five Nations Championship	
41	19 January 1929	Twickenham Stadium, London	8–3	England	1929 Five Nations Championship	
42	18 January 1930	Cardiff Arms Park, Cardiff	3–11	England	1930 Five Nations Championship	
43	17 January 1931	Twickenham Stadium, London	11–11	draw	1931 Five Nations Championship	
44	16 January 1932	St Helen's, Swansea	12–5	Wales	1932 Home Nations Championship	
45	21 January 1933	Twickenham Stadium, London	3–7	Wales	1933 Home Nations Championship	
46	20 January 1934	Cardiff Arms Park, Cardiff	0–9	England	1934 Home Nations Championship	
47	19 January 1935	Twickenham Stadium, London	3–3	draw	1935 Home Nations Championship	
48	18 January 1936	St Helen's, Swansea	0–0	draw	1936 Home Nations Championship	
49	16 January 1937	Twickenham Stadium, London	4–3	England	1937 Home Nations Championship	
50	15 January 1938	Cardiff Arms Park, Cardiff	14–8	Wales	1938 Home Nations Championship	
51	21 January 1939	Twickenham Stadium, London	3–0	England	1939 Home Nations Championship	
52	18 January 1947	Cardiff Arms Park, Cardiff	6–9	England	1947 Five Nations Championship	
53	17 January 1948	Twickenham Stadium, London	3–3	draw	1948 Five Nations Championship	
54	15 January 1949	Cardiff Arms Park, Cardiff	9–3	Wales	1949 Five Nations Championship	
55	21 January 1950	Twickenham Stadium, London	5–11	Wales	1950 Five Nations Championship	
56	20 January 1951	St Helen's, Swansea	23–5	Wales	1951 Five Nations Championship	
57	2 February 1952	Twickenham Stadium, London	6–8	Wales	1952 Five Nations Championship	
58	17 January 1953	Cardiff Arms Park, Cardiff	3–8	England	1953 Five Nations Championship	
59	16 January 1954	Twickenham Stadium, London	9–6	England	1954 Five Nations Championship	
60	22 January 1955	Cardiff Arms Park, Cardiff	3–0	Wales	1955 Five Nations Championship	
61	21 January 1956	Twickenham Stadium, London	3–8	Wales	1956 Five Nations Championship	
62	19 January 1957	Cardiff Arms Park, Cardiff	0–3	England	1957 Five Nations Championship	
63	18 January 1958	Twickenham Stadium, London	3–3	draw	1958 Five Nations Championship	
64	17 January 1959	Cardiff Arms Park, Cardiff	5–0	Wales	1959 Five Nations Championship	
65	16 January 1960	Twickenham Stadium, London	14–6	England	1960 Five Nations Championship	
66	21 January 1961	Cardiff Arms Park, Cardiff	6–3	Wales	1961 Five Nations Championship	
67	20 January 1962	Twickenham Stadium, London	0–0	draw	1962 Five Nations Championship	
68	19 January 1963	Cardiff Arms Park, Cardiff	6–13	England	1963 Five Nations Championship	
69	18 January 1964	Twickenham Stadium, London	6–6	draw	1964 Five Nations Championship	
70	16 January 1965	Cardiff Arms Park, Cardiff	14–3	Wales	1965 Five Nations Championship	
71	15 January 1966	Twickenham Stadium, London	6–11	Wales	1966 Five Nations Championship	
72	15 April 1967	Cardiff Arms Park, Cardiff	34–21	Wales	1967 Five Nations Championship	
73	20 January 1968	Twickenham Stadium, London	11–11	draw	1968 Five Nations Championship	
74	12 April 1969	Cardiff Arms Park, Cardiff	30–9	Wales	1969 Five Nations Championship	
75	28 February 1970	Twickenham Stadium, London	13–17	Wales	1970 Five Nations Championship	
76	16 January 1971	Cardiff Arms Park, Cardiff	22–6	Wales	1971 Five Nations Championship	
77	15 January 1972	Twickenham Stadium, London	3–12	Wales	1972 Five Nations Championship	
78	20 January 1973	Cardiff Arms Park, Cardiff	25–9	Wales	1973 Five Nations Championship	
79	16 March 1974	Twickenham Stadium, London	16–12	England	1974 Five Nations Championship	
80	15 February 1975	Cardiff Arms Park, Cardiff	20–4	Wales	1975 Five Nations Championship	
81	17 January 1976	Twickenham Stadium, London	9–21	Wales	1976 Five Nations Championship	
82	5 March 1977	Cardiff Arms Park, Cardiff	14–9	Wales	1977 Five Nations Championship	
83	4 February 1978	Twickenham Stadium, London	6–9	Wales	1978 Five Nations Championship	
84	17 March 1979	Cardiff Arms Park, Cardiff	27–3	Wales	1979 Five Nations Championship	
85	16 February 1980	Twickenham Stadium, London	9–8	England	1980 Five Nations Championship	
86	17 January 1981	Cardiff Arms Park, Cardiff	21–19	Wales	1981 Five Nations Championship	
87	6 March 1982	Twickenham Stadium, London	17–7	England	1982 Five Nations Championship	
88	5 February 1983	Cardiff Arms Park, Cardiff	13–13	draw	1983 Five Nations Championship	
89	17 March 1984	Twickenham Stadium, London	15–24	Wales	1984 Five Nations Championship	
90	20 April 1985	Cardiff Arms Park, Cardiff	24–15	Wales	1985 Five Nations Championship	
91	18 January 1986	Twickenham Stadium, London	21–18	England	1986 Five Nations Championship	
92	7 March 1987	Cardiff Arms Park, Cardiff	19–12	Wales	1987 Five Nations Championship	
93	8 June 1987	Ballymore Stadium, Brisbane (Australia)	3–16	Wales	1987 Rugby World Cup	
94	6 February 1988	Twickenham Stadium, London	3–11	Wales	1988 Five Nations Championship	
95	18 March 1989	Cardiff Arms Park, Cardiff	12–9	Wales	1989 Five Nations Championship	
96	17 February 1990	Twickenham Stadium, London	34–6	England	1990 Five Nations Championship	
97	19 January 1991	Cardiff Arms Park, Cardiff	6–25	England	1991 Five Nations Championship	
98	7 March 1992	Twickenham Stadium, London	24–0	England	1992 Five Nations Championship	
99	6 February 1993	Cardiff Arms Park, Cardiff	10–9	Wales	1993 Five Nations Championship	
100	19 March 1994	Twickenham Stadium, London	15–8	England	1994 Five Nations Championship	
101	18 February 1995	Cardiff Arms Park, Cardiff	9–23	England	1995 Five Nations Championship	
102	3 February 1996	Twickenham Stadium, London	21–15	England	1996 Five Nations Championship	
103	15 March 1997	Cardiff Arms Park, Cardiff	13–34	England	1997 Five Nations Championship	
104	21 February 1998	Twickenham Stadium, London	60–26	England	1998 Five Nations Championship	
105	11 April 1999	Wembley Stadium, London	32–31	Wales	1999 Five Nations Championship	
106	4 March 2000	Twickenham Stadium, London	46–12	England	2000 Six Nations Championship	
107	3 February 2001	Millennium Stadium, Cardiff	15–44	England	2001 Six Nations Championship	
108	23 March 2002	Twickenham Stadium, London	50–10	England	2002 Six Nations Championship	
109	22 February 2003	Millennium Stadium, Cardiff	9–26	England	2003 Six Nations Championship	
110	23 August 2003	Millennium Stadium, Cardiff	9–43	England	2003 Rugby World Cup warm-up match	
111	9 November 2003	Lang Park, Brisbane (Australia)	28–17	England	2003 Rugby World Cup	
112	20 March 2004	Twickenham Stadium, London	31–21	England	2004 Six Nations Championship	
113	5 February 2005	Millennium Stadium, Cardiff	11–9	Wales	2005 Six Nations Championship	
114	4 February 2006	Twickenham Stadium, London	47–13	England	2006 Six Nations Championship	
115	17 March 2007	Millennium Stadium, Cardiff	27–18	Wales	2007 Six Nations Championship	
116	4 August 2007	Twickenham Stadium, London	62–5	England	2007 Rugby World Cup warm-up match	
117	2 February 2008	Twickenham Stadium, London	19–26	Wales	2008 Six Nations Championship	
118	14 February 2009	Millennium Stadium, Cardiff	23–15	Wales	2009 Six Nations Championship	
119	6 February 2010	Twickenham Stadium, London	30–17	England	2010 Six Nations Championship	
120	4 February 2011	Millennium Stadium, Cardiff	19–26	England	2011 Six Nations Championship	
121	6 August 2011	Twickenham Stadium, London	23–19	England	2011 Rugby World Cup warm-up match	
122	13 August 2011	Millennium Stadium, Cardiff	19–9	Wales	2011 Rugby World Cup warm-up match	
123	25 February 2012	Twickenham Stadium, London	12–19	Wales	2012 Six Nations Championship	
124	16 March 2013	Millennium Stadium, Cardiff	30–3	Wales	2013 Six Nations Championship	
125	9 March 2014	Twickenham Stadium, London	29–18	England	2014 Six Nations Championship	
126	6 February 2015	Millennium Stadium, Cardiff	16–21	England	2015 Six Nations Championship	
127	26 September 2015	Twickenham Stadium, London	25–28	Wales	2015 Rugby World Cup	
128	12 March 2016	Twickenham Stadium, London	25–21	England	2016 Six Nations Championship	
129	29 May 2016	Twickenham Stadium, London	27–13	England	2016 Summer International	
130	11 February 2017	Millennium Stadium, Cardiff	16–21	England	2017 Six Nations Championship	
131	10 February 2018	Twickenham Stadium, London	12–6	England	2018 Six Nations Championship	
132	23 February 2019	Millennium Stadium, Cardiff	21–13	Wales	2019 Six Nations Championship	
133	11 August 2019	Twickenham Stadium, London	33–19	England	2019 Rugby World Cup warm-up match	
134	17 August 2019	Millennium Stadium, Cardiff	13–6	Wales	2019 Rugby World Cup warm-up match	
135	7 March 2020	Twickenham Stadium, London	33–30	England	2020 Six Nations Championship	
136	28 November 2020	Parc y Scarlets, Llanelli	13–24	England	Autumn Nations Cup	
137	27 February 2021	Millennium Stadium, Cardiff	40–24	Wales	2021 Six Nations Championship	
138	26 February 2022	Twickenham Stadium, London	23–19	England	2022 Six Nations Championship	
139	25 February 2023	Millennium Stadium, Cardiff	10–20	England	2023 Six Nations Championship	
140	5 August 2023	Millennium Stadium, Cardiff	20–9	Wales	2023 Rugby World Cup warm-up match	
141	12 August 2023	Twickenham Stadium, London	19–17	England	2023 Rugby World Cup warm-up match	
142	10 February 2024	Twickenham Stadium, London	16–14	England	2024 Six Nations Championship	
143	15 March 2025	Millennium Stadium, Cardiff	14–68	England	2025 Six Nations Championship	
144	7 February 2026	Twickenham Stadium, London	48–7	England	2026 Six Nations Championship	

== Venues ==
=== In England ===
Stadium	City	Won by England	Won by Wales	Draw
Twickenham Stadium	Twickenham, London	39	14	7
Rectory Field	Blackheath, London	4	1	0
Richardson's Field	Blackheath, London	1	0	0
Cardigan Fields	Leeds	1	0	0
Crown Flatt	Dewsbury	0	1	0
Upper Park	Birkenhead	1	0	0
Kingsholm	Gloucester	0	1	0
Welford Road	Leicester	0	0	1
Athletic Ground	Richmond, London	0	1	0
Ashton Gate	Bristol	0	1	0
Wembley Stadium	Wembley, London	0	1	0
Total		45	20	8

Note: The match at Wembley Stadium was considered a home match for Wales, who played home fixtures there from 1997 to 1999 while the Millennium Stadium was under construction.

=== In Wales ===
Stadium	City	Won by Wales	Won by England	Draw
Cardiff Arms Park	Cardiff	23	10	2
Millennium Stadium	Cardiff	9	8	0
St Helen's	Swansea	7	5	1
Rodney Parade	Newport	1	1	0
Stradey Park	Llanelli	0	0	1
Parc y Scarlets	Llanelli	0	1	0
Total		40	25	4

=== In other countries ===
Stadium	City	Country	Won by England	Won by Wales	Draw
Ballymore Stadium	Brisbane	Australia	0	1	0
Lang Park	Brisbane	Australia	1	0	0
Total			1	1	0
