= List of England national rugby union team results 1920–1929 =

These are the list of results that England have played from 1920 to 1929.

== 1920 ==
Scores and results list England's points tally first.

| Opposing Teams | For | Against | Date | Venue | Status |
|---|---|---|---|---|---|
| Wales | 5 | 19 | 17/01/1920 | St. Helen's, Swansea | Five Nations |
| France | 8 | 3 | 31/01/1920 | Twickenham, London | Five Nations |
| Ireland | 14 | 11 | 14/02/1920 | Lansdowne Road, Dublin | Five Nations |
| Scotland | 13 | 4 | 20/03/1920 | Twickenham, London | Five Nations |

== 1921 ==
Scores and results list England's points tally first.

| Opposing Teams | For | Against | Date | Venue | Status |
|---|---|---|---|---|---|
| Wales | 18 | 3 | 15/01/1921 | Twickenham, London | Five Nations |
| Ireland | 15 | 0 | 12/02/1921 | Twickenham, London | Five Nations |
| Scotland | 18 | 0 | 19/03/1921 | Inverleith, Edinburgh | Five Nations |
| France | 10 | 6 | 28/03/1921 | Stade Colombes, Paris | Five Nations |

== 1922 ==
Scores and results list England's points tally first.

| Opposing Teams | For | Against | Date | Venue | Status |
|---|---|---|---|---|---|
| Wales | 6 | 28 | 21/01/1922 | Cardiff Arms Park, Cardiff | Five Nations |
| Ireland | 12 | 3 | 11/02/1922 | Lansdowne Road, Dublin | Five Nations |
| France | 11 | 11 | 25/02/1920 | Twickenham, London | Five Nations |
| Scotland | 11 | 5 | 18/03/1922 | Twickenham, London | Five Nations |

== 1923 ==
Scores and results list England's points tally first.

| Opposing Teams | For | Against | Date | Venue | Status |
|---|---|---|---|---|---|
| Wales | 7 | 3 | 20/01/1923 | Twickenham, London | Five Nations |
| Ireland | 23 | 5 | 14/02/1923 | Welford Road, Leicester | Five Nations |
| Scotland | 8 | 6 | 21/03/1923 | Inverleith, Edinburgh | Five Nations |
| France | 12 | 3 | 06/04/1923 | Stade Colombes, Paris | Five Nations |

== 1924 ==
Scores and results list England's points tally first.

| Opposing Teams | For | Against | Date | Venue | Status |
|---|---|---|---|---|---|
| Wales | 17 | 9 | 19/01/1924 | St. Helen's, Swansea | Five Nations |
| Ireland | 14 | 3 | 09/02/1924 | Ravenhill Belfast | Five Nations |
| France | 19 | 7 | 23/02/1924 | Twickenham, London | Five Nations |
| Scotland | 19 | 0 | 15/03/1924 | Twickenham, London | Five Nations |

== 1925 ==
Scores and results list England's points tally first.

| Opposing Teams | For | Against | Date | Venue | Status |
|---|---|---|---|---|---|
| New Zealand | 11 | 17 | 03/01/1925 | Twickenham, London | Test Match |
| Wales | 12 | 6 | 17/01/1925 | Twickenham, London | Five Nations |
| Ireland | 6 | 6 | 14/02/1925 | Twickenham, London | Five Nations |
| Scotland | 11 | 14 | 21/03/1925 | Murrayfield, Edinburgh | Five Nations |
| France | 13 | 11 | 13/04/1925 | Stade Colombes, Paris | Five Nations |

== 1926 ==
Scores and results list England's points tally first.

| Opposing Teams | For | Against | Date | Venue | Status |
|---|---|---|---|---|---|
| Wales | 3 | 3 | 16/01/1926 | Cardiff Arms Park, Cardiff | Five Nations |
| Ireland | 15 | 19 | 13/02/1926 | Lansdowne Road, Dublin | Five Nations |
| France | 11 | 0 | 27/02/1926 | Twickenham, London | Five Nations |
| Scotland | 9 | 17 | 20/03/1926 | Twickenham, London | Five Nations |

== 1927 ==
Scores and results list England's points tally first.

| Opposing Teams | For | Against | Date | Venue | Status |
|---|---|---|---|---|---|
| Wales | 11 | 9 | 15/01/1927 | Twickenham, London | Five Nations |
| Ireland | 8 | 6 | 12/02/1927 | Twickenham, London | Five Nations |
| Scotland | 13 | 21 | 19/03/1927 | Murrayfield, Edinburgh | Five Nations |
| France | 0 | 3 | 02/04/1927 | Stade Colombes, Paris | Five Nations |

== 1928 ==
Scores and results list England's points tally first.

| Opposing Teams | For | Against | Date | Venue | Status |
|---|---|---|---|---|---|
| Australia | 18 | 11 | 07/01/1928 | Twickenham, London | Test Match |
| Wales | 10 | 8 | 21/01/1928 | St. Helen's, Swansea | Five Nations |
| Ireland | 7 | 6 | 11/02/1928 | Lansdowne Road, Dublin | Five Nations |
| France | 18 | 8 | 25/02/1928 | Twickenham, London | Five Nations |
| Scotland | 6 | 0 | 17/03/1928 | Twickenham, London | Five Nations |

== 1929 ==
Scores and results list England's points tally first.

| Opposing Teams | For | Against | Date | Venue | Status |
|---|---|---|---|---|---|
| Wales | 8 | 3 | 19/01/1929 | Twickenham, London | Five Nations |
| Ireland | 5 | 6 | 09/02/1929 | Twickenham, London | Five Nations |
| Scotland | 6 | 12 | 16/03/1929 | Murrayfield, Edinburgh | Five Nations |
| France | 16 | 6 | 01/04/1929 | Stade Colombes, Paris | Five Nations |

== Year Box ==
| Preceded by 1910–1914 | England Rugby Results; 1920–1929 | Succeeded by 1930–1939 |

== General references ==
- Woolgar, Jason (2004). England : the official R.F.U. history. London: Virgin. ISBN 1-85227-210-4.
- McGowan, Phil; Steele, Richard (2021). England Rugby: 150 Years. Vision Sports Publishing. ISBN 978-1-913412-09-8.
- "England". Rugby Data Bank.
