= List of England national rugby union team results 1930–1939 =

These are the list of results that England have played from 1930 to 1939.

== 1930 ==
Scores and results list England's points tally first.

Opposing Teams	For	Against	Date	Venue	Status
Wales	11	3	18/01/1930	Cardiff Arms Park, Cardiff	Five Nations
Ireland	3	4	08/02/1930	Lansdowne Road, Dublin	Five Nations
France	11	5	22/02/1930	Twickenham, London	Five Nations
Scotland	0	0	15/03/1930	Twickenham, London	Five Nations

== 1931 ==
Scores and results list England's points tally first.

Opposing Teams	For	Against	Date	Venue	Status
Wales	11	11	17/01/1931	Twickenham, London	Five Nations
Ireland	5	6	14/02/1931	Twickenham, London	Five Nations
Scotland	12	28	21/03/1931	Murrayfield, Edinburgh	Five Nations
France	13	14	06/04/1931	Stade Colombes, Paris	Five Nations

== 1932 ==
Scores and results list England's points tally first.

Opposing Teams	For	Against	Date	Venue	Status
South Africa	0	7	02/01/1932	Twickenham, London	Test Match
Wales	5	12	16/01/1932	St Helen's, Swansea	Home Nations
Ireland	11	8	13/02/1932	Lansdowne Road, Dublin	Home Nations
Scotland	16	3	19/03/1932	Twickenham, London	Home Nations

== 1933 ==
Scores and results list England's points tally first.

Opposing Teams	For	Against	Date	Venue	Status
Wales	3	7	21/01/1933	Twickenham, London	Home Nations
Ireland	17	6	11/02/1933	Twickenham, London	Home Nations
Scotland	0	3	18/03/1933	Murrayfield, Edinburgh	Home Nations

== 1934 ==
Scores and results list England's points tally first.

Opposing Teams	For	Against	Date	Venue	Status
Wales	9	0	20/01/1934	Cardiff Arms Park, Cardiff	Home Nations
Ireland	13	3	10/02/1934	Lansdowne Road, Dublin	Home Nations
Scotland	6	3	17/03/1934	Twickenham, London	Home Nations

== 1935 ==
Scores and results list England's points tally first.

Opposing Teams	For	Against	Date	Venue	Status
Wales	3	3	19/01/1935	Twickenham, London	Home Nations
Ireland	14	3	09/02/1935	Twickenham, London	Home Nations
Scotland	7	10	16/03/1935	Murryfield, Edinburgh	Home Nations

== 1936 ==
Scores and results list England's points tally first.

Opposing Teams	For	Against	Date	Venue	Status
New Zealand	13	0	04/01/1936	Twickenham, London	Test Match
Wales	0	0	18/01/1936	St Helen's, Swansea	Home Nations
Ireland	3	6	08/02/1936	Lansdowne Road, Dublin	Home Nations
Scotland	9	8	21/03/1936	Twickenham, London	Home Nations

== 1937 ==
Scores and results list England's points tally first.

Opposing Teams	For	Against	Date	Venue	Status
Wales	4	3	16/01/1937	Twickenham, London	Home Nations
Ireland	9	8	13/02/1937	Twickenham, London	Home Nations
Scotland	6	3	20/03/1937	Murryfield, Edinburgh	Home Nations

== 1938 ==
Scores and results list England's points tally first.

Opposing Teams	For	Against	Date	Venue	Status
Wales	8	14	15/01/1938	Cardiff Arms Park, Cardiff	Home Nations
Ireland	36	14	12/02/1938	Lansdowne Road, Dublin	Home Nations
Scotland	16	21	19/03/1938	Twickenham, London	Home Nations

== 1939 ==
Scores and results list England's points tally first.

Opposing Teams	For	Against	Date	Venue	Status
Wales	3	0	21/01/1939	Twickenham, London	Home Nations
Ireland	0	5	11/02/1939	Twickenham, London	Home Nations
Scotland	24	5	18/03/1939	Murryfield, Edinburgh	Home Nations

== Year Box ==
Preceded by 1920–1929	England Rugby Results; 1930–1939	Succeeded by 1947–1949

== General references ==
- Woolgar, Jason (2004). England : the official R.F.U. history. London: Virgin. ISBN 1-85227-210-4.
- McGowan, Phil; Steele, Richard (2021). England Rugby: 150 Years. Vision Sports Publishing. ISBN 978-1-913412-09-8.
- "England". Rugby Data Bank.
