= Bert Sparks =

England international rugby union player

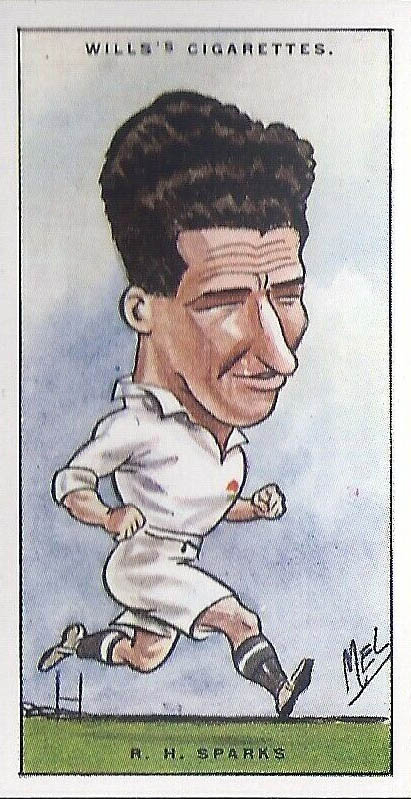
- Full name: Robert Henry Ware Sparks
- Born: 19 February 1899 East Stonehouse, Plymouth, Devon, England
- Died: 15 August 1984 (aged 85) Cheltenham, Somerset, England

Rugby union career
- Position: Prop
International career
Years	Team	Apps	(Points)
1928–31	England	9	(0)

Robert Henry Ware Sparks (19 February 1899 – 15 August 1984) was an English international rugby union player.

Born in East Stonehouse, Plymouth, Sparks was a charge hand at the HM Devonport dockyards and played his rugby as a front row forward with Plymouth Albion, which he captained for two seasons.

Sparks debuted for England in their grand slam-winning 1928 Five Nations campaign, playing three of the matches, as one of three Plymouth forwards (with Jerry Hanley and Edward Stanbury). He made another three appearances in 1929, didn't feature in 1930, then played three times in 1931, to finish with nine caps.

== See also ==
- List of England national rugby union players
