= Leslie Haslett =

England international rugby union player

- Full name: Leslie Woods Haslett
- Born: 5 June 1900 Pontypool, Wales
- Died: 7 July 1992 (aged 92) Montreal, Canada
- School: Cheltenham College

Rugby union career
- Position: Second row
International career
Years	Team	Apps	(Points)
1926	England	2	(3)

Leslie Woods Haslett (5 June 1900 – 7 July 1992) was an English international rugby union player.

Born in Pontypool, Wales, Haslett spent his last four years of school at Cheltenham College and worked for a chartered accountancy firm in London, where he played rugby for Blackheath. He joined Birkenhead Park in 1925-26 and was capped twice for England in the 1926 Five Nations, scoring a try on debut against Ireland at Lansdowne Road.

Haslett emigrated to Canada in 1929 and held various positions with the Montreal Board of Trade, including president.

== See also ==
- List of England national rugby union players
