= Walter Legge (rugby union) =

- Full name: Walter Sydney George Legge
- Born: 11 November 1911 Risca, Wales
- Died: 22 December 1984 (aged 73) Newport, Wales

Rugby union career
- Position: Fullback
International career
Years	Team	Apps	(Points)
1937–38	Wales	2	(5)

Walter Sydney George Legge (11 November 1911 — 22 December 1984) was a Welsh international rugby union player of the 1930s.

A Newport fullback, Legge gained his first Wales cap in the 1937 Home Nations under fortunate circumstances, having been initially overlooked for the match against Ireland at Belfast. Heavy snow however caused the match to be postponed for several days and the original fullback Tommy Stone was no longer available, meaning a debut for Legge. He kicked Wales' only points of the match through a penalty goal in a 3–5 loss.

Legg was capped a second time against Ireland in a home 1938 Home Nations fixture, deputising an injured Vivian Jenkins. He contributed a touchline conversion to help Wales win the match.

== See also ==
- List of Wales national rugby union players
