= John Ryan (rugby union coach) =

Welsh rugby union coach (1939–2022)

- Born: John Michael Ryan; 29 September 1939
- Died: 18 November 2022 (aged 83)
- Weight: 6' 2"
- School: Newport NS, St. Michaels R. C. School
- University: Nottingham

Rugby union career
- Current team: Newport HSOB
Senior career
Years	Team	Apps	(Points)
- Newport, London Welsh, Newport HS0B
International career
Years	Team	Apps	(Points)
- Middlesex County, UAU

John Ryan ('Buck') was a Welsh rugby union coach. Following success as a coach with Newport RFC and Cardiff RFC he was head coach of the Wales national rugby union team from 1988 to 1990. At the time he was the first Wales coach to have not played for the national team.
