= List of England national rugby union team results 1947–1949 =

These are the list of results that England have played from 1947 to 1949.

== 1947 ==
Scores and results list England's points tally first.

Opposing Teams	For	Against	Date	Venue	Status
Wales	9	6	18/01/1947	Cardiff Arms Park, Cardiff	Five Nations
Ireland	0	22	08/02/1947	Lansdowne Road, Dublin	Five Nations
Scotland	24	5	15/03/1947	Twickenham, London	Five Nations
France	6	3	19/04/1947	Twickenham, London	Five Nations

== 1948 ==
Scores and results list England's points tally first.

Opposing Teams	For	Against	Date	Venue	Status
Australia	0	11	03/01/1948	Twickenham, London	Test Match
Wales	3	3	17/01/1948	Twickenham, London	Five Nations
Ireland	10	11	14/02/1948	Twickenham, London	Five Nations
Scotland	3	6	20/03/1948	Murrayfield, Edinburgh	Five Nations
France	0	15	29/03/1948	Stade Colombes, Paris	Five Nations

== 1949 ==
Scores and results list England's points tally first.

Opposing Teams	For	Against	Date	Venue	Status
Wales	3	9	15/01/1949	Cardiff Arms Park, Cardiff	Five Nations
Ireland	5	14	12/02/1949	Lansdowne Road, Dublin	Five Nations
France	8	3	26/02/1949	Twickenham, London	Five Nations
Scotland	19	3	19/03/1949	Twickenham, London	Five Nations

== Year Box ==
Preceded by 1930–1939	England Rugby Results; 1947–1949	Succeeded by 1950–1959

== General references ==
- Woolgar, Jason (2004). England : the official R.F.U. history. London: Virgin. ISBN 1-85227-210-4.
- McGowan, Phil; Steele, Richard (2021). England Rugby: 150 Years. Vision Sports Publishing. ISBN 978-1-913412-09-8.
- "England". Rugby Data Bank.
