= Jerry Hanley =

England international rugby union player

- Full name: Joseph Hanley
- Born: 14 September 1901 Queenstown, Co. Cork, Ireland
- Died: 5 May 1981 (aged 79) Plymouth, Devon, England

Rugby union career
- Position: Wing-forward
International career
Years	Team	Apps	(Points)
1927–28	England	7	(3)

Joseph "Jerry" Hanley (14 September 1901 – 5 May 1981) was an English international rugby union player.

A Plymouth Albion wing-forward, Hanley was capped seven times for England, including all four matches of their 1928 Five Nations campaign, where his try in final fixture against Scotland helped secure the grand slam.

Hanley was falsely reported to have been killed following a German raid on Plymouth in 1941.

== See also ==
- List of England national rugby union players
