= 1936 Home Nations Championship =

International rugby union competition

- Date: 18 January - 21 March 1936
- Countries: England; Ireland; Scotland; Wales

Tournament statistics
- Champions: Wales (10th title)
- Matches played: 6

The 1936 Home Nations Championship was the thirty-second series of the rugby union Home Nations Championship. Including the previous incarnations as the Five Nations, and prior to that, the Home Nations, this was the forty-ninth series of the northern hemisphere rugby union championship. Six matches were played between 18 January and 21 March. It was contested by England, Ireland, Scotland and Wales.

== Table ==
Pos	Team	Pld	W	D	L	PF	PA	PD	Pts
1	Wales	3	2	1	0	16	3	+13	5
2	Ireland	3	2	0	1	16	10	+6	4
3	England	3	1	1	1	12	14	−2	3
4	Scotland	3	0	0	3	15	32	−17	0

== Results ==
1936-01-18

Wales	0–0	England

Swansea

1936-02-01

Scotland	3–13	Wales

Murrayfield

1936-02-08

Ireland	6–3	England

Dublin

1936-02-22

Scotland	4–10	Ireland

Edinburgh

1936-03-14

Wales	3–0	Ireland

Cardiff

1936-03-21

England	9–8	Scotland

London
