= 1935 Home Nations Championship =

International rugby union competition

- Date: 19 January - 16 March 1935
- Countries: England; Ireland; Scotland; Wales

Tournament statistics
- Champions: Ireland (4th title)
- Matches played: 6

The 1935 Home Nations Championship was the thirty-first series of the rugby union Home Nations Championship. Including the previous incarnations as the Five Nations, and prior to that, the Home Nations, this was the forty-eighth series of the northern hemisphere rugby union championship. Six matches were played between 19 January and 16 March. It was contested by England, Ireland, Scotland and Wales.

== Table ==
Pos	Team	Pld	W	D	L	PF	PA	PD	Pts
1	Ireland	3	2	0	1	24	22	+2	4
2	England	3	1	1	1	24	16	+8	3
2	Wales	3	1	1	1	16	18	−2	3
4	Scotland	3	1	0	2	21	29	−8	2

== Results ==
1935-01-19

England	3–3	Wales

London

1935-02-02

Wales	10–6	Scotland

Cardiff

1935-02-09

England	14–3	Ireland

London

1935-02-23

Ireland	12–5	Scotland

Dublin

1935-03-09

Ireland	9–3	Wales

Belfast

1935-03-16

Scotland	10–7	England

Edinburgh
