= 1930 Five Nations Championship =

Rugby union competition

- Date: 1 January - 12 April 1930
- Countries: England; France; Ireland; Scotland; Wales

Tournament statistics
- Champions: England (11th title)
- Matches played: 10

The 1930 Five Nations Championship was the sixteenth series of the rugby union Five Nations Championship following the inclusion of France into the Home Nations Championship. Including the previous Home Nations Championships, this was the forty-third series of the annual northern hemisphere rugby union championship. Ten matches were played between 1 January and 21 April. It was contested by England, France, Ireland, Scotland and Wales.

== Table ==
Pos	Team	Pld	W	D	L	PF	PA	PD	Pts
1	England	4	2	1	1	25	12	+13	5
2	Wales	4	2	0	2	35	30	+5	4
2	Ireland	4	2	0	2	25	31	−6	4
2	France	4	2	0	2	17	25	−8	4
5	Scotland	4	1	1	2	26	30	−4	3

== Results ==
1930-01-01

France	7–3	Scotland

Paris

1930-01-18

Wales	3–11	England

Cardiff

1930-01-25

Ireland	0–5	France

Belfast

1930-02-01

Scotland	12–9	Wales

Edinburgh

1930-02-08

Ireland	4–3	England

Dublin

1930-02-22

England	11–5	France

London

1930-02-22

Scotland	11–14	Ireland

Edinburgh

1930-03-08

Wales	12–7	Ireland

Swansea

1930-03-15

England	0–0	Scotland

London

1930-03-21

France	0–11	Wales

Paris
