= 1929 Five Nations Championship =

Rugby union competition

- Date: 31 December 1928 - 1 April 1929
- Countries: England; France; Ireland; Scotland; Wales

Tournament statistics
- Champions: Scotland (9th title)
- Matches played: 10

The 1929 Five Nations Championship was the fifteenth series of the rugby union Five Nations Championship following the inclusion of France into the Home Nations Championship. Including the previous Home Nations Championships, this was the forty-second series of the annual northern hemisphere rugby union championship. Ten matches were played between 31 December 1928 and 1 April 1929. It was contested by England, France, Ireland, Scotland and Wales.

== Table ==
Pos	Team	Pld	W	D	L	PF	PA	PD	Pts
1	Scotland	4	3	0	1	41	30	+11	6
2	Wales	4	2	1	1	30	23	+7	5
2	Ireland	4	2	1	1	24	26	−2	5
4	England	4	2	0	2	35	27	+8	4
5	France	4	0	0	4	12	36	−24	0

== Results ==
1928-12-31

France	0–6	Ireland

Paris

1929-01-19

Scotland	6–3	France

Edinburgh

1929-01-19

England	8–3	Wales

London

1929-02-02

Wales	17–7	Scotland

Swansea

1929-02-09

England	5–6	Ireland

London

1929-02-23

Wales	8–3	France

Cardiff

1929-02-23

Ireland	7–16	Scotland

Dublin

1929-03-09

Ireland	5–5	Wales

Belfast

1929-03-16

Scotland	12–6	England

Edinburgh

1929-04-01

France	6–16	England

Paris
