= 1923 Five Nations Championship =

Rugby union competition

- Date: 20 January - 14 April 1923
- Countries: England; France; Ireland; Scotland; Wales

Tournament statistics
- Champions: England (8th title)
- Grand Slam: England (4th title)
- Triple Crown: England (7th title)
- Matches played: 10

The 1923 Five Nations Championship was the ninth series of the rugby union Five Nations Championship following the inclusion of France into the Home Nations Championship. Including the previous Home Nations Championships, this was the thirty-sixth series of the annual northern hemisphere rugby union championship. Ten matches were played between 20 January and 14 April. It was contested by England, France, Ireland, Scotland and Wales.

For the second time in three years Scotland missed out on a first Grand Slam after losing to England, this time at home playing at Inverleith.

== Table ==
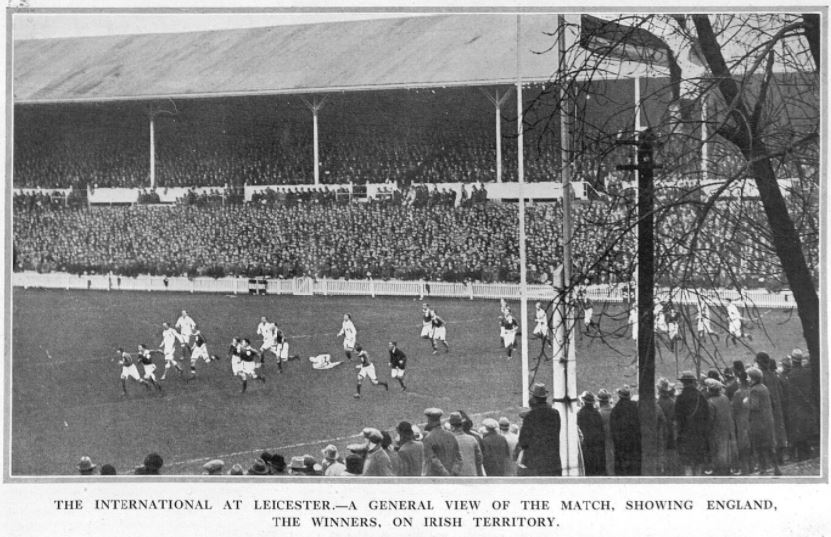
England v Ireland match in Leicester 1923

Pos	Team	Pld	W	D	L	PF	PA	PD	Pts
1	England	4	4	0	0	50	17	+33	8
2	Scotland	4	3	0	1	46	22	+24	6
3	Wales	4	1	0	3	31	31	0	2
3	France	4	1	0	3	28	52	−24	2
3	Ireland	4	1	0	3	21	54	−33	2

== Results ==
1923-01-20

Scotland	16–3	France

Edinburgh

1923-01-20

England	7–3	Wales

London

1923-02-03

Wales	3–11	Scotland

Cardiff

1923-02-10

England	23–5	Ireland

Leicester

1923-02-24

Wales	16–8	France

Swansea

1923-02-24

Ireland	3–13	Scotland

Dublin

1923-03-10

Ireland	5–4	Wales

Dublin

1923-03-17

Scotland	6–8	England

Edinburgh

1923-04-02

France	3–12	England

Paris

1923-04-14

France	14–8	Ireland

Paris
