= 1920 Five Nations Championship =

Rugby union competition

- Date: 1 January – 3 April 1920
- Countries: England; France; Ireland; Scotland; Wales

Tournament statistics
- Champions: England, Scotland and Wales
- Matches played: 10

The 1920 Five Nations Championship was the sixth series of the rugby union Five Nations Championship following the inclusion of France into the Home Nations Championship, and the first played since the 1914 Games due to World War I. Including the previous Home Nations Championships, this was the thirty-third series of the annual northern hemisphere rugby union championship. Ten matches were played between 1 January and 3 April. It was contested by England, France, Ireland, Scotland and Wales.

Scotland missed out on a first Grand Slam after losing to England at Twickenham.

== Table ==
Pos	Team	Pld	W	D	L	PF	PA	PD	Pts
1	Wales	4	3	0	1	58	23	+35	6
1	Scotland	4	3	0	1	37	18	+19	6
1	England	4	3	0	1	40	37	+3	6
4	France	4	1	0	3	23	26	−3	2
5	Ireland	4	0	0	4	22	76	−54	0

== Results ==
1920-01-01

France	0–5	Scotland

Paris

1920-01-17

Wales	19–5	England

Swansea

1920-01-31

England	8–3	France

London

1920-02-07

Scotland	9–5	Wales

Edinburgh

1920-02-14

Ireland	11–14	England

Dublin

1920-02-17

France	5–6	Wales

Paris

1920-02-28

Scotland	19–0	Ireland

Edinburgh

1920-03-13

Wales	28–4	Ireland

Cardiff

1920-03-20

England	13–4	Scotland

London

1920-04-03

Ireland	7–15	France

Dublin
