= 1926 Five Nations Championship =

Rugby union competition

- Date: 3 January - 2 April 1926
- Countries: England; France; Ireland; Scotland; Wales

Tournament statistics
- Champions: Ireland and Scotland
- Matches played: 10

The 1926 Five Nations Championship was the twelfth series of the rugby union Five Nations Championship following the inclusion of France into the Home Nations Championship. Including the previous Home Nations Championships, this was the thirty-ninth series of the annual northern hemisphere rugby union championship. Ten matches were played between 3 January and 2 April. It was contested by England, France, Ireland, Scotland and Wales.

Ireland missed out on a first Grand Slam after losing to Wales at St. Helen's.

== Table ==
Pos	Team	Pld	W	D	L	PF	PA	PD	Pts
1	Scotland	4	3	0	1	45	23	+22	6
1	Ireland	4	3	0	1	41	26	+15	6
3	Wales	4	2	1	1	26	24	+2	5
4	England	4	1	1	2	38	39	−1	3
5	France	4	0	0	4	11	49	−38	0

== Results ==
1926-01-03

France	6–20	Scotland

Paris

1926-01-16

Wales	3–3	England

Cardiff

1926-01-23

Ireland	11–0	France

Belfast
Referee: Alfred Lawrie

1926-02-06

Scotland	8–5	Wales

Edinburgh

1926-02-13

Ireland	19–15	England

Dublin

1926-02-27

England	11–0	France

London

1926-02-27

Scotland	0–3	Ireland

Edinburgh

1926-03-13

Wales	11–8	Ireland

Swansea

1926-03-20

England	9–17	Scotland

London

1926-04-02

France	5–7	Wales

Paris
