= 1937 Home Nations Championship =

International rugby union competition

- Date: 16 January - 3 April 1937
- Countries: England; Ireland; Scotland; Wales

Tournament statistics
- Champions: England (13th title)
- Triple Crown: England (11th title)
- Matches played: 6

The 1937 Home Nations Championship was the thirty-third series of the rugby union Home Nations Championship. Including the previous incarnations as the Five Nations, and prior to that, the Home Nations, this was the fiftieth series of the northern hemisphere rugby union championship. Six matches were played between 16 January and 3 April. It was contested by England, Ireland, Scotland and Wales.

== Table ==
Pos	Team	Pld	W	D	L	PF	PA	PD	Pts
1	England	3	3	0	0	19	14	+5	6
2	Ireland	3	2	0	1	24	16	+8	4
3	Scotland	3	1	0	2	20	23	−3	2
4	Wales	3	0	0	3	12	22	−10	0

== Results ==
1937-01-18

England	4–3	Wales
	Report

Twickenham Stadium, London

1937-02-06

Wales	6–13	Scotland

Swansea

1937-02-13

England	9–8	Ireland
	Report

Twickenham Stadium, London

1937-02-27

Ireland	11–4	Scotland

Dublin

1937-03-20

Scotland	3–6	England
	Report

Murrayfield, Edinburgh

1937-04-03

Ireland	5–3	Wales

Belfast
