= 1928 Five Nations Championship =

Rugby union competition

- Date: 2 January - 9 April 1928
- Countries: England; France; Ireland; Scotland; Wales

Tournament statistics
- Champions: England (10th title)
- Grand Slam: England (6th title)
- Triple Crown: England (9th title)
- Matches played: 10

The 1928 Five Nations Championship was the fourteenth series of the rugby union Five Nations Championship following the inclusion of France into the Home Nations Championship. Including the previous Home Nations Championships, this was the forty-first series of the annual northern hemisphere rugby union championship. Ten matches were played between 2 January and 9 April. It was contested by England, France, Ireland, Scotland and Wales.

== Table ==
Pos	Team	Pld	W	D	L	PF	PA	PD	Pts
1	England	4	4	0	0	41	22	+19	8
2	Ireland	4	3	0	1	44	30	+14	6
3	Wales	4	1	0	3	34	31	+3	2
3	Scotland	4	1	0	3	20	38	−18	2
3	France	4	1	0	3	30	48	−18	2

== Results ==
1928-01-02

France	6–15	Scotland

Paris

1928-01-21

Wales	8–10	England

Swansea

1928-01-28

Ireland	12–8	France

Belfast

1928-02-04

Scotland	0–13	Wales

Edinburgh

1928-02-11

Ireland	6–7	England

Dublin

1928-02-25

England	18–8	France

London

1928-02-25

Scotland	5–13	Ireland

Edinburgh

1928-03-10

Wales	10–13	Ireland

Cardiff

1928-03-17

England	6–0	Scotland

London

1928-04-09

France	8–3	Wales

Paris
