= List of England national rugby union team matches =

In each box is a list of all the international matches played by the England national rugby union team in each decade.

== Matches ==
A standard points scoring system was only agreed in 1891.

Updated to England's 2023 Rugby World Cup warm-up fixture against Wales, 5 August 2023.

Decade	Matches					Points		
Decade	P	W	D	L	%	PF	PA	Diff.
1870s	14	8	4	2	57.14	—N/a	—N/a	—N/a
1880s	22	15	5	2	68.18	—N/a	—N/a	—N/a
1890s	30	14	1	15	46.67	191	167	+24
1900s	37	11	3	23	29.73	310	388	–78
1910s	21	16	1	4	76.19	276	118	+158
1920s	42	29	3	10	69.05	477	321	+156
1930s	34	17	4	13	50	293	227	+66
1940s	13	5	1	7	38.46	90	111	–21
1950s	43	22	6	15	51.16	310	230	+80
1960s	48	16	10	22	33.33	387	475	–88
1970s	50	15	3	32	30	553	738	–185
1980s	61	28	5	28	45.90	1,031	966	+65
1990s	91	61	2	28	67.03	2,450	1,536	+914
2000s	104	66	0	38	63.46	3,137	1,887	+1,250
2010s	81	54	2	25	66.67	2,080	1,408	+672
2020s	43	26	1	16	60.47	1164	832	+332
Overall	728	399	51	278	54.81	11,566	9,306	+2,260

== Tours ==
In 1963 England went on their first tour to the Southern Hemisphere. They played New Zealand and Australia.

Year	To	Captain	Head coach	Result	Score
1963	New Zealand & Australia	Mike Weston	J. W. T. Berry	Lost; Lost	0-2 (New Zealand); 0-1 (Australia)
1972	South Africa	John Pullin	A. O. Lewis	Won	1-0
1973	Fiji & New Zealand	John Pullin	D. L. Sanders	Won; Won	1-0 (Fiji); 1-0 (New Zealand)
1975	Australia	Tony Neary; John Pullin	A. O. Lewis	Lost	0-2
1981	Argentina	Bill Beaumont	W. G. D. Morgan	Won	1-0 (with 1 draw)
1984	South Africa	John Scott	W. G. D. Morgan	Lost	0-2
1985	New Zealand	Paul Dodge	W. G. D. Morgan	Lost	0-2
1988	Australia & Fiji	John Orwin; Richard Harding	Geoff Cooke	Lost; Won	0-2 (Australia); 1-0 (Fiji)
1989	Romania	Rob Andrew	Geoff Cooke	Won	1-0
1990	Argentina	Will Carling	Geoff Cooke	Draw	1-1
1991	Australia & Fiji	Will Carling	Jack Rowell	Won; Lost	1-0 (Fiji); 0-1 (Australia)
1993	Canada	Christopher John Olver	Mike Slemen	Draw	1-1
1994	South Africa	Will Carling	Jack Rowell	Draw	1-1
1997	Argentina & Australia	Phil de Glanville	Jack Rowell	Draw; Lost	1-1 (Argentina); 0-1 (Australia)
1998	Australia, New Zealand & South Africa	Matt Dawson	Clive Woodward	Lost; Lost; Lost	0-1 (Australia); 0-2 (New Zealand); 0-1 (South Africa)
1999	Australia	Martin Johnson	Clive Woodward	Lost	0-1
2000	South Africa	Martin Johnson	Clive Woodward	Draw	1-1
2001	Canada & United States	Kyran Bracken	Clive Woodward	Won; Won	2-0 (Canada); 1-0 (USA)
2002	Argentina	Phil Vickery	Clive Woodward	Won	1-0
2003	New Zealand & Australia	Martin Johnson	Clive Woodward	Won; Won	1-0 (New Zealand); 1-0 (Australia)
2004	New Zealand & Australia	Lawrence Dallaglio	Clive Woodward	Lost; Lost	0-2 (New Zealand); 0-1 (Australia)
2006	Australia	Pat Sanderson	Andy Robinson	Lost	0-2
2007	South Africa	Jason Robinson; Jonny Wilkinson	Brian Ashton	Lost	0-2
2008	New Zealand	Steve Borthwick	Rob Andrew	Lost	0-2
2010	Australasia	Lewis Moody	Martin Johnson	Draw	1-1
2012	South Africa	Chris Robshaw	Stuart Lancaster	Lost	0-2
2013	Argentina	Tom Wood	Stuart Lancaster	Won	2-0
2014	New Zealand	Chris Robshaw	Stuart Lancaster	Lost	0-3
2016	Australia	Dylan Hartley	(Australia) Eddie Jones	Won	3-0
2017	Argentina	Dylan Hartley	(Australia) Eddie Jones	Won	2-0
2018	South Africa	Owen Farrell	(Australia) Eddie Jones	Lost	2-1
2022	Australia	Courtney Lawes	(Australia) Eddie Jones	Won	2-1

== Honours ==
Competition	Winners	Runners-up	Third place	Fourth place
Rugby World Cup	2003	1991; 2007; 2019	2023	1995

Competition	Grand Slam	Title
Home International; Five Nations; Six Nations; Championship	1913, 1914, 1921, 1923, 1924, 1928, 1957, 1980, 1991, 1992, 1995, 2003, 2016	1883, 1884, 1886*, 1890*, 1892, 1910, 1912*, 1913, 1914, 1920*, 1921, 1923, 1924, 1928, 1930, 1932*, 1934, 1937, 1939, 1947, 1953, 1954*, 1957, 1958, 1960*, 1963, 1973*, 1980, 1991, 1992, 1995, 1996, 2000, 2001, 2003, 2011, 2016, 2017, 2020

- Shared*

Competition	Winners	Countries
Triple Crown	1883–1884, 1892, 1913–1914, 1921, 1923–1924, 1928, 1934, 1937, 1954, 1957, 1960, 1980, 1991, 1992, 1995–1998, 2002, 2003, 2014, 2016, 2020	Scotland; Wales; Ireland
Calcutta Cup	1880–1881, 1883–1890, 1892, 1897, 1902, 1906, 1910–1912, 1913–1924, 1928, 1932, 1934, 1936–1938, 1939–1947, 1949, 1951–1964, 1967–1969, 1973, 1975, 1977–1983, 1985, 1987–1989, 1991–1999, 2001–2005, 2007, 2009–2017, 2020, 2025	Scotland
Millennium Trophy	1988–1992, 1995–2000, 2002, 2003, 2008, 2012–2014, 2016, 2019, 2020, 2024	Ireland
Cook Cup	2000–2003, 2005, 2010, 2013-2023, 2025	Australia

== Head coaches ==
Name	Tenure	Tests	Won	Drew	Lost	Win percentage
Don White	20 December 1969 – 17 April 1971	11	3	1	7	27.3%
John Elders	15 January 1972 – 16 March 1974	16	6	1	9	37.5%
John Burgess	18 January 1975 – 31 May 1975	6	1	0	5	16.7%
Peter Colston	3 January 1976 – 17 March 1979	18	6	1	11	33.3%
Mike Davis	24 November 1979 – 6 March 1982	16	10	2	4	62.5%
Dick Greenwood	15 January 1983 – 20 April 1985	17	4	2	11	23.5%
Martin Green	1 June 1985 – 8 June 1987	14	5	0	9	35.7%
Geoff Cooke	16 January 1988 – 19 March 1994	49	35	1	13	71.4%
Jack Rowell	4 June 1994 – 12 July 1997	29	21	0	8	72.4%
Sir Clive Woodward	15 November 1997 – 2 June 2004	83	59	2	22	71.1%
Andy Robinson	15 November 2004 – 25 November 2006	22	9	0	13	40.9%
Brian Ashton	3 February 2007 – April 2008	21	11	0	10	52.4%
Martin Johnson	1 July 2008 – 16 November 2011	38	21	1	17	55.3%
Stuart Lancaster	8 December 2011 – 11 November 2015	46	28	1	17	60.9%
Eddie Jones	20 November 2015 – 6 December 2022	78	59	1	18	75.3%
Steve Borthwick	19 December 2022 – present	40	25	0	15	62.5%

== Stats ==
Flag	Nation(s)	From	To	Test matches				Tour matches				Total record							
Flag	Nation(s)	From	To	P	W	D	L	P	W	D	L	P	W	D	L	%	PF	PA	PD
(New Zealand) (Australia)	1963 tour of Oceania; Test series England 0–2 New Zealand; England 0–1 Australia	18 May	4 June	3	-	-	3	3	1	-	2	6	1	-	5	16.67%	54	91	-37
(South Africa)	1972 tour of South Africa; Test series England 1–0 South Africa	17 May	3 June	1	1	-	-	6	5	1	-	7	6	1	-	85.71%	166	58	+108
(Fiji) (New Zealand)	1973 tour of Oceania; Test series England 1–0 Fiji (tour match); England 1–0 New Zealand	28 August	15 September	1	1	-	-	4	1	-	3	5	2	-	3	40%	60	72	-12
(Australia)	1975 tour of Australia; Test series England 0–2 Australia	10 May	3 June	2	-	-	2	6	4	-	2	8	4	-	4	50%	217	119	+98
(Argentina)	1981 tour of Argentina; Test series England 1–0 Argentina (1 draw)	16 May	6 June	2	1	1	-	5	5	-	-	7	6	1	-	85.71%	193	100	+93
(South Africa)	1984 tour of South Africa; Test series England 0–2 South Africa	19 May	9 June	2	-	-	2	5	4	1	-	7	4	1	2	57.14%	156	145	+11
(New Zealand)	1985 tour of New Zealand; Test series England 0–2 New Zealand	18 May	8 June	2	-	-	2	5	4	-	1	7	4	1	2	57.14%	146	123	+23
(Australia) (Fiji)	1988 tour of Oceania; Test series England 0–2 Australia; England 1–0 Fiji	17 May	17 June	3	1	-	2	6	5	-	1	9	6	-	3	66.67%	203	137	+66
(Romania)	1989 tour of Romania; Test series England 1–0 Romania			1	1	0	0	-	-	-	-	-	-	-	-	-	-	-	-
(Argentina)	1990 tour of Argentina; Test series (England); England 1–1 Argentina	14 July	4 August	2	1	-	1	5	2	-	3	7	3	-	4	42.86%	137	129	+8
(Fiji) (Australia)	1991 tour of Oceania; Test series England 1–0 Fiji; England 0–1 Australia			2	1	-	1	5	2	-	3	7	3	-	4	42.86%	-	-	-
(South Africa)	1994 tour of South Africa; Test series (South Africa); England 1–1 South Africa			2	1	-	1	6	2	-	4	8	3	-	5	37.5%	-	-	-
(Argentina)	1997 tour of Argentina; Test series (England); England 1–1 Argentina			2	1	-	1	4	3	-	1	6	4	-	2	66.67%	-	-	-
(Australia)	1997 tour of Australia; Test series England 0–1 Australia	12 June	12 June	1	-	-	1	-	-	-	-	1	-	-	1	0%	6	25	-19
(Australia) (New Zealand) (South Africa)	1998 tour of the Tri Nations; Test series England 0–1 Australia; England 0–2 New Zealand; England 0–1 South Africa	6 June	4 July	4	-	-	4	3	-	-	3	7	-	-	7	0%	88	328	-240
(Australia)	1999 tour of Australia; Test series England 0–1 Australia	19 June	26 June	1	-	-	1	1	1	-	-	2	1	-	1	50%	54	36	+18
(South Africa)	2000 tour of South Africa; Test series (shared); England 1–1 South Africa	13 June	28 June	2	1	-	1	3	3	-	-	5	4	-	1	80%	183	105	+78
(Canada) (United States)	2001 tour of North America; Test series England 2–0 Canada; England 1–0 United States	2 June	16 June	3	3	-	-	2	2	-	-	5	5	-	-	100%	253	89	+164
(Argentina)	2002 tour of Argentina; Test series England 1–0 Argentina	17 June	22 June	1	1	-	-	1	-	-	1	2	1	-	1	50%	50	47	+3
(New Zealand) (Australia)	2003 tour of Oceania; Test series England 1–0 New Zealand; England 1–0 Australia	9 June	21 June	2	2	-	-	1	1	-	-	3	3	-	-	100%	63	36	+27
(New Zealand) (Australia)	2004 tour of Oceania; Test series England 0–2 New Zealand; England 0–1 Australia	12 June	26 June	3	-	-	3	-	-	-	-	3	-	-	3	0%	30	123	-97
(Australia)	2006 tour of Australia; Test series England 0–2 Australia	11 June	17 June	2	-	-	2	-	-	-	-	2	-	-	2	0%	21	77	-56
(South Africa)	2007 tour of South Africa; Test series England 0–2 South Africa	26 May	6 June	2	-	-	2	-	-	-	-	2	-	-	2	0%	32	113	-81

=== Overall ===
England have won 457 of their 818 Test Matches, with a 55.87% win percentage. Below is a summary table of test matches played by England up to 15 March 2026. Only fixtures recognised as test matches by the RFU are included.

Opponent	Pld	W	D	L	Win %	PF	PA	PD
Argentina	30	24	1	5	80%	814	488	326
Australia	57	29	1	27	51%	1,092	1,204	−112
Canada	7	7	0	0	100%	343	87	256
Chile	1	1	0	0	100%	71	0	71
Fiji	10	9	0	1	90%	393	181	212
France	113	61	7	45	54%	1,867	1,563	304
Georgia	3	3	0	0	100%	165	16	149
Ireland	144	81	8	55	56%	1,806	1,383	423
Italy	33	32	0	1	97%	1,289	427	862
Japan	6	6	0	0	100%	292	78	214
Netherlands	1	1	0	0	100%	110	0	110
New Zealand	47	9	2	36	19%	706	1,100	−394
New Zealand Natives	1	1	0	0	100%	7	0	7
Pacific Islanders	1	1	0	0	100%	39	13	26
Presidents XV	1	0	0	1	0%	11	28	−17
Romania	5	5	0	0	100%	335	24	311
Samoa	9	9	0	0	100%	310	131	179
Scotland	144	77	19	48	53%	1,790	1,367	423
South Africa	47	16	2	29	34%	804	1,017	−213
Tonga	4	4	0	0	100%	241	36	205
United States	8	8	0	0	100%	381	93	288
Uruguay	2	2	0	0	100%	171	16	155
Wales	144	71	12	61	49%	2,042	1,804	238
Total	818	457	52	309	55.87%	15,079	11,056	+4,023

== See also ==
- History of the England national rugby union team
