= 1959–60 Rugby Union County Championship =

English rugby union competition

1959–60 County Championship
- Countries: England
- Champions: Warwickshire (4th title)
- Runners-up: Surrey

The 1959–60 Rugby Union County Championship was the 60th edition of England's premier rugby union club competition at the time.

Warwickshire won the competition for the fourth time and third in succession after defeating Surrey in the final.

== Final ==
12 March 1960

| Warwickshire | 9–6 | Surrey |
| Try: Jackson; Pen: Cole (2) | | Pen: Lewis; Drop: Lewis |

Coundon Road Stadium, Coventry
Referee: Air Vice-Marshal G A Walker (Hertfordshire)

| Jim Stewart | Coventry |
| Peter Jackson | Coventry |
| T Carris | Nuneaton |
| C A Hewitt | Coventry |
| J R Melville | Coventry |
| J A Pargetter | Moseley |
| G Cole | Coventry |
| Phil Judd | Coventry |
| E Robinson | Coventry |
| M R McLean | Coventry |
| John Price | Coventry |
| Tom Pargetter | Moseley |
| Stan Purdy | Rugby |
| J F Gardiner | Coventry |
| Peter Robbins (capt) | Moseley |

| B H Lewis | London Welsh |
| John Young | Harlequins |
| J R Simons | Harlequins |
| W A Richards | London Welsh |
| C R J Hawke | London Hospital |
| Ricky Bartlett | Harlequins |
| J P Watterson | Richmond |
| K Wronski | London University & Rosslyn Park |
| E J Jones | London Welsh |
| G C Murray | Oxford University & Harlequins |
| David Perry | London Scottish |
| D I Jones | London Welsh |
| J S Abbott (capt) | Harlequins |
| Victor Marriott | Harlequins |
| D Thompson | Harlequins |

== See also ==
- English rugby union system
- Rugby union in England
