= 1957–58 Rugby Union County Championship =

English rugby union competition

1957–58 County Championship
- Countries: England
- Champions: Warwickshire (2nd title)
- Runners-up: Cornwall

The 1957–58 Rugby Union County Championship was the 58th edition of England's premier rugby union club competition at the time.

Warwickshire won the competition for the second time after defeating Cornwall in the final.

== Final ==
8 March 1958

Warwickshire	16–8	Cornwall
Try: Carris, Gardiner, Jackson; Con: Cole (2); Pen: Cole		Try: Roberts; Con: Hosen; Pen: Stevens

Coundon Road Stadium, Coventry
Referee: E V Barnes (Middlesex Society)

Fenwick Allison (capt)	Coventry
Peter Jackson	Coventry
Jim Stewart	Coventry
T Carris	Nuneaton
D Curry	Moseley
C A Hewitt	Coventry
G Cole	Coventry
Phil Judd	Coventry
F J Webb	Rugby
M R McLean	Coventry
John Price	Coventry
Tom Pargetter	Moseley
R F Batsone	Coventry
J F Gardiner	Coventry
Stan Purdy	Rugby

H Stevens (capt)	Redruth
J M Jenkin	Gloucester
G G Luke	Penzance-Newlyn
Roger Hosen	Penryn
J Morgan	Falmouth
G Paul	Penzance-Newlyn
P J B Mitchell	Penzance-Newlyn
A Mitchell	Redruth
K Abrahams	Redruth
C R Johns	Redruth
G Harris	Camborne
A Williams	Penzance-Newlyn
V G Roberts	Penryn
J Phillips	Redruth
D Mills	Harlequins

== See also ==
- English rugby union system
- Rugby union in England
