= List of England national rugby union team results 1960–1969 =

These are the list of results that England have played from 1960 to 1969.

== 1960 ==
Scores and results list England's points tally first.

Opposing Teams	For	Against	Date	Venue	Status
Wales	14	6	16/01/1960	Twickenham, London	Five Nations
Ireland	8	5	13/02/1960	Twickenham, London	Five Nations
France	3	3	27/02/1960	Stade Colombes, Paris	Five Nations
Scotland	21	12	19/03/1960	Murrayfield, Edinburgh	Five Nations

== 1961 ==
Scores and results list England's points tally first.

Opposing Teams	For	Against	Date	Venue	Status
South Africa	0	5	07/01/1961	Twickenham, London	Test Match
Wales	3	6	21/01/1961	Cardiff Arms Park, Cardiff	Five Nations
Ireland	8	11	11/02/1961	Lansdowne Road, Dublin	Five Nations
France	5	5	25/02/1961	Twickenham, London	Five Nations
Scotland	6	0	18/03/1961	Twickenham, London	Five Nations

== 1962 ==
Scores and results list England's points tally first.

Opposing Teams	For	Against	Date	Venue	Status
Wales	0	0	20/01/1962	Twickenham, London	Five Nations
Ireland	16	0	10/02/1962	Twickenham, London	Five Nations
France	0	13	24/02/1962	Stade Colombes, Paris	Five Nations
Scotland	3	3	17/03/1962	Murrayfield, Edinburgh	Five Nations

== 1963 ==
Scores and results list England's points tally first.

Opposing Teams	For	Against	Date	Venue	Status
Wales	13	6	19/01/1963	Cardiff Arms Park, Cardiff	Five Nations
Ireland	0	0	09/02/1963	Lansdowne Road, Dublin	Five Nations
France	6	5	23/02/1963	Twickenham, London	Five Nations
Scotland	10	8	16/03/1963	Twickenham, London	Five Nations
New Zealand	11	21	25/05/1963	Eden Park, Auckland	First Test
New Zealand	6	9	01/06/1963	Lancaster Park, Christchurch	Second Test
Australia	9	18	04/06/1963	Sydney Sports Ground, Sydney	Test Match

== 1964 ==
Scores and results list England's points tally first.

Opposing Teams	For	Against	Date	Venue	Status
New Zealand	0	14	04/01/1964	Twickenham, London	Test Match
Wales	6	6	18/01/1964	Twickenham, London	Five Nations
Ireland	5	18	08/02/1964	Twickenham, London	Five Nations
France	6	3	22/02/1964	Stade Colombes, Paris	Five Nations
Scotland	6	15	21/03/1964	Murrayfield, Edinburgh	Five Nations

== 1965 ==
Scores and results list England's points tally first.

Opposing Teams	For	Against	Date	Venue	Status
Wales	3	14	16/01/1965	Cardiff Arms Park, Cardiff	Five Nations
Ireland	0	5	13/02/1965	Lansdowne Road, Dublin	Five Nations
France	9	6	27/02/1965	Twickenham, London	Five Nations
Scotland	3	3	20/03/1965	Twickenham, London	Five Nations

== 1966 ==
Scores and results list England's points tally first.

Opposing Teams	For	Against	Date	Venue	Status
Wales	6	11	15/01/1966	Twickenham, London	Five Nations
Ireland	6	6	12/02/1966	Twickenham, London	Five Nations
France	0	13	26/02/1966	Stade Colombes, Paris	Five Nations
Scotland	3	6	19/03/1966	Murrayfield, Edinburgh	Five Nations

== 1967 ==
Scores and results list England's points tally first.

Opposing Teams	For	Against	Date	Venue	Status
Australia	11	23	07/01/1967	Twickenham, London	Test Match
Ireland	8	3	11/02/1967	Lansdowne Road, Dublin	Five Nations
France	12	16	25/02/1967	Twickenham, London	Five Nations
Scotland	27	14	18/03/1967	Twickenham, London	Five Nations
Wales	21	34	15/04/1967	Cardiff Arms Park, Cardiff	Five Nations
New Zealand	11	23	04/11/1967	Twickenham, London	Test Match

== 1968 ==
Scores and results list England's points tally first.

Opposing Teams	For	Against	Date	Venue	Status
Wales	11	11	20/01/1968	Twickenham, London	Five Nations
Ireland	9	9	10/02/1968	Twickenham, London	Five Nations
France	9	14	24/02/1968	Stade Colombes, Paris	Five Nations
Scotland	8	6	16/03/1968	Murrayfield, Edinburgh	Five Nations

== 1969 ==
Scores and results list England's points tally first.

Opposing Teams	For	Against	Date	Venue	Status
Ireland	15	17	08/02/1969	Lansdowne Road, Dublin	Five Nations
France	22	8	22/02/1969	Twickenham, London	Five Nations
Scotland	8	3	15/03/1969	Twickenham, London	Five Nations
Wales	9	30	12/04/1969	Cardiff Arms Park, Cardiff	Five Nations
South Africa	11	8	20/12/1969	Twickenham, London	Test Match

== Year Box ==
Preceded by 1950–1959	England Rugby Results; 1960–1969	Succeeded by 1970–1979
