= List of England national rugby union team results 2020–2029 =

This list is of the results of test matches played by the England national rugby union team, as well as their future fixtures, from 2020 to 2029.

== 2020 ==
Date	Opposition	Venue	Score		Competition	Result	Winner	Captain	World Ranking (Note: The Ranking is of the post-match result.)	Trophy/Other comp.	Ref.
Date	Opposition	Venue	Home	Away	Competition	Result	Winner	Captain	World Ranking	Trophy/Other comp.	Ref.
2 February	France	Stade de France, Saint-Denis	24	17	2020 Six Nations Championship	Loss	France	Owen Farrell	3rd	Le Crunch	
8 February	Scotland	Murrayfield Stadium, Edinburgh	6	13	2020 Six Nations Championship	Win	England	Owen Farrell	3rd	Calcutta Cup	
23 February	Ireland	Twickenham Stadium, London	24	12	2020 Six Nations Championship	Win	England	Owen Farrell	3rd	Millennium Trophy	
7 March	Wales	Twickenham Stadium, London	33	30	2020 Six Nations Championship	Win	England	Owen Farrell	3rd	—	
31 October	Italy	Stadio Olimpico, Rome	5	34	2020 Six Nations Championship	Win	England	Owen Farrell	3rd	—	
14 November	Georgia	Twickenham Stadium, London	40	0	Autumn Nations Cup	Win	England	Owen Farrell	2nd	—N/a	
21 November	Ireland	Twickenham Stadium, London	18	7	Autumn Nations Cup	Win	England	Owen Farrell	2nd	Millennium Trophy	
28 November	Wales	Parc y Scarlets, Llanelli	13	24	Autumn Nations Cup	Win	England	Owen Farrell	2nd	—N/a	
6 December	France	Twickenham Stadium, London	22	19	Autumn Nations Cup	Win (Note: After extra-time)	England	Owen Farrell	2nd	Le Crunch	

P	W	D	L	PF	PA	Diff.	W%
9	8	0	1	225	116	+109	88.89

== 2021 ==
Date	Opposition	Venue	Score		Competition	Result	Winner	Captain	World Ranking	Trophy/Other comp.	Ref.
Date	Opposition	Venue	Home	Away	Competition	Result	Winner	Captain	World Ranking	Trophy/Other comp.	Ref.
6 February	Scotland	Twickenham Stadium, London	6	11	2021 Six Nations Championship	Loss	Scotland	Owen Farrell	3rd	Calcutta Cup	
13 February	Italy	Twickenham Stadium, London	41	18	2021 Six Nations Championship	Win	England	Owen Farrell	3rd	—N/a	
27 February	Wales	Millennium Stadium, Cardiff	40	24	2021 Six Nations Championship	Loss	Wales	Owen Farrell	4th	—N/a	
13 March	France	Twickenham Stadium, London	23	20	2021 Six Nations Championship	Win	England	Owen Farrell	3rd	Le Crunch	
20 March	Ireland	Aviva Stadium, Dublin	32	18	2021 Six Nations Championship	Loss	Ireland	Owen Farrell	4th	Millennium Trophy	
4 July	United States	Twickenham Stadium, London	43	29	2021 Summer International	Win	England	Lewis Ludlow	3rd	—N/a	
10 July	Canada	Twickenham Stadium, London	70	14	2021 Summer International	Win	England	Lewis Ludlow	3rd	—N/a	
6 November	Tonga	Twickenham Stadium, London	69	3	2021 Autumn International	Win	England	Courtney Lawes	4th	—N/a	
13 November	Australia	Twickenham Stadium, London	32	15	2021 Autumn International	Win	England	Owen Farrell	3rd	Cook Cup	
20 November	South Africa	Twickenham Stadium, London	27	26	2021 Autumn International	Win	England	Courtney Lawes	3rd	—	

P	W	D	L	PF	PA	Diff.	W%
10	7	0	3	353	208	+145	70

== 2022 ==
Date	Opposition	Venue	Score		Competition	Result	Winner	Captain	World Ranking	Trophy/Other comp.	Ref.
Date	Opposition	Venue	Home	Away	Competition	Result	Winner	Captain	World Ranking	Trophy/Other comp.	Ref.
5 February	Scotland	Murrayfield Stadium, Edinburgh	20	17	2022 Six Nations Championship	Loss	Scotland	Tom Curry	4th	Calcutta Cup	
13 February	Italy	Stadio Olimpico, Rome	0	33	2022 Six Nations Championship	Win	England	Tom Curry	3rd	—N/a	
26 February	Wales	Twickenham Stadium, London	23	19	2022 Six Nations Championship	Win	England	Courtney Lawes	4th	—N/a	
12 March	Ireland	Twickenham Stadium, London	15	32	2022 Six Nations Championship	Loss	Ireland	Courtney Lawes	5th	Millennium Trophy	
19 March	France	Stade de France, Saint-Denis	25	13	2022 Six Nations Championship	Loss	France	Courtney Lawes	5th	Le Crunch	
19 June	Barbarians	Twickenham Stadium, London	21	52	2022 Summer International	Loss	Barbarians	Tom Curry	5th	Quilter Cup	
2 July	Australia	Perth Stadium, Perth	30	28	2022 England tour of Australia	Loss	Australia	Courtney Lawes	6th	Ella–Mobbs Trophy	
9 July	Australia	Lang Park, Brisbane	17	25	2022 England tour of Australia	Win	England	Courtney Lawes	5th	Ella–Mobbs Trophy	
16 July	Australia	Sydney Cricket Ground, Sydney	17	21	2022 England tour of Australia	Win	England	Courtney Lawes	5th	Ella–Mobbs Trophy	
6 November	Argentina	Twickenham Stadium, London	29	30	2022 Autumn International	Loss	Argentina	Owen Farrell	5th	—	
12 November	Japan	Twickenham Stadium, London	52	13	2022 Autumn International	Win	England	Owen Farrell	5th	—N/a	
19 November	New Zealand	Twickenham Stadium, London	25	25	2022 Autumn International	Draw	draw	Owen Farrell	5th	Hillary Shield	
26 November	South Africa	Twickenham Stadium, London	13	27	2022 Autumn International	Loss	South Africa	Owen Farrell	5th	—N/a	

Without Barbarians fixture (Note: The Barbarians are an international invitational team that often compete against England in a one-off test. The match between England and the Barbarians has no effect on international rankings or England's international results.)
P	W	D	L	PF	PA	Diff.	W%
12	5	1	6	294	255	+39	41.67

With Barbarians fixture
P	W	D	L	PF	PA	Diff.	W%
13	5	1	7	315	307	+8	38.46

== 2023 ==
Date	Opposition	Venue	Score		Competition	Result	Winner	Captain	World Ranking	Trophy/Other comp.	Ref.
Date	Opposition	Venue	Home	Away	Competition	Result	Winner	Captain	World Ranking	Trophy/Other comp.	Ref.
4 February	Scotland	Twickenham Stadium, London	23	29	2023 Six Nations Championship	Loss	Scotland	Owen Farrell	6th	Calcutta Cup	
12 February	Italy	Twickenham Stadium, London	31	14	2023 Six Nations Championship	Win	England	Owen Farrell	6th	—N/a	
25 February	Wales	Millennium Stadium, Cardiff	10	20	2023 Six Nations Championship	Win	England	Owen Farrell	6th	—N/a	
11 March	France	Twickenham Stadium, London	10	53	2023 Six Nations Championship	Loss	France	Ellis Genge	6th	Le Crunch	
18 March	Ireland	Aviva Stadium, Dublin	29	16	2023 Six Nations Championship	Loss	Ireland	Owen Farrell	6th	Millennium Trophy	
5 August	Wales	Millennium Stadium, Cardiff	20	9	2023 Rugby World Cup warm-up	Loss	Wales	Ellis Genge	6th	—N/a	
12 August	Wales	Twickenham Stadium, London	19	17	2023 Rugby World Cup warm-up	Win	England	Owen Farrell	6th	—N/a	
19 August	Ireland	Aviva Stadium, Dublin	29	10	2023 Rugby World Cup warm-up	Loss	Ireland	Courtney Lawes	6th	Millennium Trophy	
26 August	Fiji	Twickenham Stadium, London	22	30	2023 Rugby World Cup warm-up	Loss	Fiji	Courtney Lawes	8th	—N/a	
9 September	Argentina	Stade Vélodrome, Marseille	27	10	2023 Rugby World Cup pool stage	Win	England^{(PS)}	Courtney Lawes	6th	—N/a	
17 September	Japan	Allianz Riviera, Nice	34	12	2023 Rugby World Cup pool stage	Win	England^{(PS)}	Courtney Lawes	6th	—N/a	
23 September	Chile	Stade Pierre-Mauroy, Lille	71	0	2023 Rugby World Cup pool stage	Win	England^{(PS)}	Owen Farrell	6th	—N/a	
7 October	Samoa	Stade Pierre-Mauroy, Lille	18	17	2023 Rugby World Cup pool stage	Win	England^{(PS)}	Owen Farrell	6th	—N/a	
15 October	Fiji	Stade Vélodrome, Marseille	30	24	2023 Rugby World Cup knockout stage	Win	England^{(QF)}	Owen Farrell	5th	—N/a	
21 October	South Africa	Stade de France, Saint-Denis	15	16	2023 Rugby World Cup knockout stage	Loss	South Africa^{(SF)}	Owen Farrell	5th	—N/a	
27 October	Argentina	Stade de France, Saint-Denis	23	26	2023 Rugby World Cup knockout stage	Win	England^{(3rd)}	Owen Farrell	5th	—N/a	

P	W	D	L	PF	PA	Diff.	W%
16	9	0	7	381	333	+48	56.25

== 2024 ==
Date	Opposition	Venue	Score		Competition	Result	Winner	Captain	World Ranking	Trophy/Other comp.	Ref.
Date	Opposition	Venue	Home	Away	Competition	Result	Winner	Captain	World Ranking	Trophy/Other comp.	Ref.
3 February	Italy	Stadio Olimpico, Rome	24	27	2024 Six Nations Championship	Win	England	Jamie George	5th	—N/a	
10 February	Wales	Twickenham Stadium, London	16	14	2024 Six Nations Championship	Win	England	Jamie George	5th	—N/a	
24 February	Scotland	Murrayfield Stadium, Edinburgh	30	21	2024 Six Nations Championship	Loss	Scotland	Jamie George	5th	Calcutta Cup	
9 March	Ireland	Twickenham Stadium, London	23	22	2024 Six Nations Championship	Win	England	Jamie George	5th	Millennium Trophy	
16 March	France	Parc Olympique Lyonnais, Lyon	33	31	2024 Six Nations Championship	Loss	France	Jamie George	5th	Le Crunch	
22 June	Japan	Japan National Stadium, Tokyo	17	52	2024 England tour of Japan and New Zealand	Win	England	Jamie George	5th	—N/a	
6 July	New Zealand	Forsyth Barr Stadium, Dunedin	16	15	2024 England tour of Japan and New Zealand	Loss	New Zealand	Jamie George	5th	Hillary Shield	
13 July	New Zealand	Eden Park, Auckland	24	17	2024 England tour of Japan and New Zealand	Loss	New Zealand	Jamie George	5th	Hillary Shield	
2 November	New Zealand	Twickenham Stadium, London	22	24	2024 Autumn International	Loss	New Zealand	Jamie George	5th	Hillary Shield	
9 November	Australia	Twickenham Stadium, London	37	42	2024 Autumn International	Loss	Australia	Jamie George	7th	Ella–Mobbs Trophy	
16 November	South Africa	Twickenham Stadium, London	20	29	2024 Autumn International	Loss	South Africa	Jamie George	7th	—N/a	
24 November	Japan	Twickenham Stadium, London	59	14	2024 Autumn International	Win	England	Jamie George	7th	—N/a	

P	W	D	L	PF	PA	Diff.	W%
12	5	0	7	340	289	+51	41.67

== 2025 ==
Date	Opposition	Venue	Score		Competition	Result	Winner	Captain	World Ranking	Trophy/Other comp.	Ref.
Date	Opposition	Venue	Home	Away	Competition	Result	Winner	Captain	World Ranking	Trophy/Other comp.	Ref.
1 February	Ireland	Aviva Stadium, Dublin	27	22	2025 Six Nations Championship	Loss	Ireland	Maro Itoje	7th	Millennium Trophy	
8 February	France	Twickenham Stadium, London	26	25	2025 Six Nations Championship	Win	England	Maro Itoje	6th	Le Crunch	
22 February	Scotland	Twickenham Stadium, London	16	15	2025 Six Nations Championship	Win	England	Maro Itoje	6th	Calcutta Cup	
9 March	Italy	Twickenham Stadium, London	47	24	2025 Six Nations Championship	Win	England	Maro Itoje	6th	—N/a	
15 March	Wales	Millennium Stadium, Cardiff	14	68	2025 Six Nations Championship	Win	England	Maro Itoje	6th	—N/a	
21 June	France XV	Twickenham Stadium, London	24	26	Non test cap international	Loss	France XV	George Ford	6th	—N/a	
5 July	Argentina	Estadio Luis Hirschi, Buenos Aires	12	35	2025 England tour of Argentina and the United States	Win	England	George Ford	5th	—N/a	
12 July	Argentina	Estadio San Juan, San Juan	17	22	2025 England tour of Argentina and the United States	Win	England	George Ford	5th	—N/a	
19 July	United States	Audi Field, Washington, D.C.	5	40	2025 England tour of Argentina and the United States	Win	England	George Ford	5th	—N/a	
1 November	Australia	Twickenham Stadium, London	25	7	2025 Autumn International	Win	England	Maro Itoje	4th	Ella–Mobbs Trophy	
8 November	Fiji	Twickenham Stadium, London	38	18	2025 Autumn International	Win	England	Ellis Genge	4th	—N/a	
15 November	New Zealand	Twickenham Stadium, London	33	19	2025 Autumn International	Win	England	Maro Itoje	3rd	Hillary Shield	
23 November	Argentina	Twickenham Stadium, London	27	23	2025 Autumn International	Win	England	Maro Itoje	3rd	—N/a	

P	W	D	L	PF	PA	Diff.	W%
12	11	0	1	399	206	+193	91.67

== 2026 ==
Date	Opposition	Venue	Score		Competition	Result	Winner	Captain	World Ranking	Trophy/Other comp.	Ref.
Date	Opposition	Venue	Home	Away	Competition	Result	Winner	Captain	World Ranking	Trophy/Other comp.	Ref.
5 February	Wales	Twickenham Stadium, London	48	7	2026 Six Nations Championship	Win	England	Jamie George	3rd	—N/a	
14 February	Scotland	Murrayfield Stadium, Edinburgh	31	20	2026 Six Nations Championship	Loss	Scotland	Maro Itoje	4th	Calcutta Cup	
21 February	Ireland	Twickenham Stadium, London	21	42	2026 Six Nations Championship	Loss	Ireland	Maro Itoje	5th	Millennium Trophy	
7 March	Italy	Stadio Olimpico, Rome	23	18	2026 Six Nations Championship	Loss	Italy	Maro Itoje	6th	—N/a	
14 March	France	Stade de France, Saint-Denis	48	46	2026 Six Nations Championship	Loss	France	Maro Itoje	6th	Le Crunch	
19 June	France XV	Stade de la Rabine, Vannes	35	19	Non test cap international	Loss	France XV	George Ford	6th	—N/a	
4 July	South Africa	Ellis Park Stadium, Johannesburg	45	21	2026 Nations Championship Southern Hemisphere Series	Loss	South Africa	Jamie George	6th	—N/a	
11 July	Fiji	Hill Dickinson Stadium, Liverpool (Note: Fiji were required to reverse their home 2026 Nations Championship fixture by World Rugby as their national stadium, the HFC Bank Stadium, does not meet the competition's requirements.)	8	73	2026 Nations Championship Southern Hemisphere Series	Win	England	Jamie George	5th	—N/a	
18 July	Argentina	Estadio Único Madre de Ciudades, Santiago del Estero	24	31	2026 Nations Championship Southern Hemisphere Series	Win	England	Jamie George	5th	—N/a	
8 November	Australia	Twickenham Stadium, London	45	22	2026 Nations Championship Northern Hemisphere Series	Win	England	Maro Itoje	5th	Ella–Mobbs Trophy	
14 November	Japan	Twickenham Stadium, London	78	15	2026 Nations Championship Northern Hemisphere Series	Win	England	Maro Itoje	5th	—N/a	
21 November	New Zealand	Twickenham Stadium, London	37	12	2026 Nations Championship Northern Hemisphere Series	Win	England	Maro Itoje	5th	Hillary Shield	
28 November	New Zealand	Twickenham Stadium, London	TBD		2026 Nations Championship Finals	TBD				Hillary Shield	

P	W	D	L	PF	PA	Diff.	W%
11	6	0	5	438	277	+161	54.5

== 2027 ==
Date	Opposition	Venue	Score		Competition	Result	Winner	Captain	World Ranking	Trophy/Other comp.	Ref.
Date	Opposition	Venue	Home	Away	Competition	Result	Winner	Captain	World Ranking	Trophy/Other comp.	Ref.
5 February	Ireland	Aviva Stadium, Dublin	TBD		2027 Six Nations Championship	TBD				Millennium Trophy	
14 February	France	Twickenham Stadium, London	TBD		2027 Six Nations Championship	TBD				Le Crunch	
20 February	Italy	Twickenham Stadium, London	TBD		2027 Six Nations Championship	TBD				—N/a	
6 March	Wales	Millennium Stadium, Cardiff	TBD		2027 Six Nations Championship	TBD				—N/a	
13 March	Scotland	Twickenham Stadium, London	TBD		2027 Six Nations Championship	TBD				Calcutta Cup	
September	Ireland	Twickenham Stadium, London	TBD		2027 Rugby World Cup warm-up matches	TBD				Millennium Trophy	
September	France	Twickenham Stadium, London	TBD		2027 Rugby World Cup warm-up matches	TBD				Le Crunch	
September	Italy	Twickenham Stadium, London	TBD		2027 Rugby World Cup warm-up matches	TBD				—N/a	
2 October	Tonga	Lang Park, Brisbane	TBD		2027 Rugby World Cup	TBD				—N/a	
8 October	Zimbabwe	Adelaide Oval, Adelaide	TBD		2027 Rugby World Cup	TBD				—N/a	
16 October	Wales	Stadium Australia, Sydney	TBD		2027 Rugby World Cup	TBD				—N/a	

== Year box ==
Preceded by 2010–2019	England Rugby Results; 2020–2029	Succeeded by 2030–2039
