= History of rugby union matches between England and France =

Le Crunch
- FFR Cover of 2018 Six Nations Championship fixture between France and England.

- England France
- Other names: Eurostar Trophy
- Sport: Rugby union
- First meeting: 22 March 1906; 120 years ago
- Latest meeting: 14 March 2026; 4 months ago
- Stadiums: Twickenham Stadium; Stade de France

Statistics
- All-time record: England: 61; France: 45; Draws: 7
- Largest victory: 11 March 2023; 3 years ago; England 10–53 France
- Smallest victory: England (1) (Note: Both England and France have beaten each other by a one-point margin on multiple occasions.); France (1)
- Largest goal scoring: 14 March 2026; 4 months ago; France 48–46 England
- Longest win streak: England (11)
- Longest unbeaten streak: England (16)

Le Crunch (English: The Crunch) (Note: "Eurostar Trophy" has been used several times in France since the year 2000.) describes the rugby union rivalry between England and France. Popularised in the 1980s and 90s, the term described both teams' dominant success in the Five Nations Championship during that period.

Both teams compete annually in the Six Nations Championship. Apart from their annual fixture, the teams have also met in six warm-up matches prior to the 2003, 2007 and 2015 Rugby World Cups (RWC), with France winning on four occasions and England two. They have also met on five occasions at the Rugby World Cup with England winning on three occasions and France two.

== Summary ==
=== Overall ===
Details	Played	Won by England	Won by France	Drawn	England points	France points
In England	54	37	12	5	975	634
In France	56	23	31	2	847	884
Neutral venue	3	1	2	0	45	45
Overall	113	61	45	7	1,867	1,563

=== Records ===
Note: Date shown in brackets indicates when the record was last set.

Record	England	France
Longest winning streak	11 (22 March 1906 – 28 March 1921)	4 (1 February 1975 – 21 January 1978)
Largest points for
Home	55 (21 March 2015)	48 (14 March 2026)
Away	46 (14 March 2026)	53 (11 March 2023)
Largest winning margin
Home	37 (28 January 1911)	25 (26 February 1972; 12 March 2006)
Away	27 (22 March 1906)	43 (11 March 2023)

== Results ==
No.	Date	Venue	Score	Winner	Competition
1	22 March 1906	Parc des Princes, Paris	8–35	England	1906 England tour of France
2	5 January 1907	Athletic Ground, Richmond	41–13	England	1907 France tour of England
3	1 January 1908	Stade Yves-du-Manoir, Colombes	0–19	England	1908 England tour of France
4	30 January 1909	Welford Road, Leicester	22–0	England	1909 France tour of England
5	3 March 1910	Parc des Princes, Paris	3–11	England	1910 Five Nations Championship
6	28 January 1911	Twickenham Stadium, London	37–0	England	1911 Five Nations Championship
7	8 April 1912	Parc des Princes, Paris	8–18	England	1912 Five Nations Championship
8	25 January 1913	Twickenham Stadium, London	20–0	England	1913 Five Nations Championship
9	13 April 1914	Stade Yves-du-Manoir, Colombes	13–39	England	1914 Five Nations Championship
10	31 January 1920	Twickenham Stadium, London	8–3	England	1920 Five Nations Championship
11	28 March 1921	Stade Yves-du-Manoir, Colombes	6–10	England	1921 Five Nations Championship
12	25 February 1922	Twickenham Stadium, London	11–11	draw	1922 Five Nations Championship
13	2 April 1923	Stade Yves-du-Manoir, Colombes	3–12	England	1923 Five Nations Championship
14	23 February 1924	Twickenham Stadium, London	19–7	England	1924 Five Nations Championship
15	13 April 1925	Stade Yves-du-Manoir, Colombes	11–13	England	1925 Five Nations Championship
16	27 February 1926	Twickenham Stadium, London	11–0	England	1926 Five Nations Championship
17	2 April 1927	Stade Yves-du-Manoir, Colombes	3–0	France	1927 Five Nations Championship
18	25 February 1928	Twickenham Stadium, London	18–8	England	1928 Five Nations Championship
19	1 April 1929	Stade Yves-du-Manoir, Colombes	6–16	England	1929 Five Nations Championship
20	22 February 1930	Twickenham Stadium, London	11–5	England	1930 Five Nations Championship
21	6 April 1931	Stade Yves-du-Manoir, Colombes	14–13	France	1931 Five Nations Championship
22	19 April 1947	Twickenham Stadium, London	6–3	England	1947 Five Nations Championship
23	29 March 1948	Stade Yves-du-Manoir, Colombes	15–0	France	1948 Five Nations Championship
24	26 February 1949	Twickenham Stadium, London	8–3	England	1949 Five Nations Championship
25	25 February 1950	Stade Yves-du-Manoir, Colombes	6–3	France	1950 Five Nations Championship
26	24 February 1951	Twickenham Stadium, London	3–11	France	1951 Five Nations Championship
27	5 April 1952	Stade Yves-du-Manoir, Colombes	3–6	England	1952 Five Nations Championship
28	28 February 1953	Twickenham Stadium, London	11–0	England	1953 Five Nations Championship
29	10 April 1954	Stade Yves-du-Manoir, Colombes	11–3	France	1954 Five Nations Championship
30	26 February 1955	Twickenham Stadium, London	9–16	France	1955 Five Nations Championship
31	14 April 1956	Stade Yves-du-Manoir, Colombes	14–9	France	1956 Five Nations Championship
32	23 February 1957	Twickenham Stadium, London	9–5	England	1957 Five Nations Championship
33	1 March 1958	Stade Yves-du-Manoir, Colombes	0–14	England	1958 Five Nations Championship
34	28 February 1959	Twickenham Stadium, London	3–3	draw	1959 Five Nations Championship
35	27 February 1960	Stade Yves-du-Manoir, Colombes	3–3	draw	1960 Five Nations Championship
36	25 February 1961	Twickenham Stadium, London	5–5	draw	1961 Five Nations Championship
37	24 February 1962	Stade Yves-du-Manoir, Colombes	13–0	France	1962 Five Nations Championship
38	23 February 1963	Twickenham Stadium, London	6–5	England	1963 Five Nations Championship
39	22 February 1964	Stade Yves-du-Manoir, Colombes	3–6	England	1964 Five Nations Championship
40	27 February 1965	Twickenham Stadium, London	9–6	England	1965 Five Nations Championship
41	26 February 1966	Stade Yves-du-Manoir, Colombes	13–0	France	1966 Five Nations Championship
42	25 February 1967	Twickenham Stadium, London	12–16	France	1967 Five Nations Championship
43	24 February 1968	Stade Yves-du-Manoir, Colombes	14–9	France	1968 Five Nations Championship
44	22 February 1969	Twickenham Stadium, London	22–8	England	1969 Five Nations Championship
45	18 April 1970	Stade Yves-du-Manoir, Colombes	35–13	France	1970 Five Nations Championship
46	27 February 1971	Twickenham Stadium, London	14–14	draw	1971 Five Nations Championship
47	26 February 1972	Stade Yves-du-Manoir, Colombes	37–12	France	1972 Five Nations Championship
48	24 February 1973	Twickenham Stadium, London	14–6	England	1973 Five Nations Championship
49	2 March 1974	Parc des Princes, Paris	12–12	draw	1974 Five Nations Championship
50	1 February 1975	Twickenham Stadium, London	20–27	France	1975 Five Nations Championship
51	20 March 1976	Parc des Princes, Paris	30–9	France	1976 Five Nations Championship
52	1 February 1977	Twickenham Stadium, London	3–4	France	1977 Five Nations Championship
53	21 January 1978	Parc des Princes, Paris	15–6	France	1978 Five Nations Championship
54	1 February 1979	Twickenham Stadium, London	7–6	England	1979 Five Nations Championship
55	2 February 1980	Parc des Princes, Paris	13–17	England	1980 Five Nations Championship
56	21 March 1981	Twickenham Stadium, London	12–16	France	1981 Five Nations Championship
57	20 February 1982	Parc des Princes, Paris	15–27	England	1982 Five Nations Championship
58	15 January 1983	Twickenham Stadium, London	15–19	France	1983 Five Nations Championship
59	3 March 1984	Parc des Princes, Paris	32–18	France	1984 Five Nations Championship
60	2 February 1985	Twickenham Stadium, London	9–9	draw	1985 Five Nations Championship
61	15 March 1986	Parc des Princes, Paris	29–10	France	1986 Five Nations Championship
62	21 February 1987	Twickenham Stadium, London	15–19	France	1987 Five Nations Championship
63	16 January 1988	Parc des Princes, Paris	10–9	France	1988 Five Nations Championship
64	4 March 1989	Twickenham Stadium, London	11–0	England	1989 Five Nations Championship
65	3 February 1990	Parc des Princes, Paris	7–26	England	1990 Five Nations Championship
66	16 March 1991	Twickenham Stadium, London	21–19	England	1991 Five Nations Championship
67	19 October 1991	Parc des Princes, Paris	10–19	England	1991 Rugby World Cup
68	15 February 1992	Parc des Princes, Paris	13–31	England	1992 Five Nations Championship
69	16 January 1993	Twickenham Stadium, London	16–15	England	1993 Five Nations Championship
70	5 March 1994	Parc des Princes, Paris	14–18	England	1994 Five Nations Championship
71	4 February 1995	Twickenham Stadium, London	31–10	England	1995 Five Nations Championship
72	22 June 1995	Loftus Versfeld, Pretoria (South Africa)	9–19	France	1995 Rugby World Cup
73	20 January 1996	Parc des Princes, Paris	15–12	France	1996 Five Nations Championship
74	1 March 1997	Twickenham Stadium, London	20–23	France	1997 Five Nations Championship
75	7 February 1998	Stade de France, Saint-Denis	24–17	France	1998 Five Nations Championship
76	20 March 1999	Twickenham Stadium, London	21–10	England	1999 Five Nations Championship
77	19 February 2000	Stade de France, Saint-Denis	9–15	England	2000 Six Nations Championship
78	7 April 2001	Twickenham Stadium, London	48–19	England	2001 Six Nations Championship
79	2 March 2002	Stade de France, Saint-Denis	20–15	France	2002 Six Nations Championship
80	15 February 2003	Twickenham Stadium, London	25–17	England	2003 Six Nations Championship
81	30 August 2003	Stade Vélodrome, Marseille	17–16	France	2003 Rugby World Cup warm-up match
82	6 September 2003	Twickenham Stadium, London	45–14	England	2003 Rugby World Cup warm-up match
83	16 November 2003	Stadium Australia, Sydney (Australia)	24–7	England	2003 Rugby World Cup
84	27 March 2004	Stade de France, Saint-Denis	24–21	France	2004 Six Nations Championship
85	14 February 2005	Twickenham Stadium, London	17–18	France	2005 Six Nations Championship
86	12 March 2006	Stade de France, Saint-Denis	31–6	France	2006 Six Nations Championship
87	11 March 2007	Twickenham Stadium, London	26–18	England	2007 Six Nations Championship
88	11 August 2007	Twickenham Stadium, London	15–21	France	2007 Rugby World Cup warm-up match
89	18 August 2007	Stade Vélodrome, Marseille	22–9	France	2007 Rugby World Cup warm-up match
90	13 October 2007	Stade de France, Saint-Denis	9–14	England	2007 Rugby World Cup
91	23 February 2008	Stade de France, Saint-Denis	13–24	England	2008 Six Nations Championship
92	15 March 2009	Twickenham Stadium, London	34–10	England	2009 Six Nations Championship
93	20 March 2010	Stade de France, Saint-Denis	12–10	France	2010 Six Nations Championship
94	26 February 2011	Twickenham Stadium, London	17–9	England	2011 Six Nations Championship
95	8 October 2011	Eden Park, Auckland (New Zealand)	19–12	France	2011 Rugby World Cup
96	11 March 2012	Stade de France, Saint-Denis	22–24	England	2012 Six Nations Championship
97	23 February 2013	Twickenham Stadium, London	23–13	England	2013 Six Nations Championship
98	1 February 2014	Stade de France, Saint-Denis	26–24	France	2014 Six Nations Championship
99	21 March 2015	Twickenham Stadium, London	55–35	England	2015 Six Nations Championship
100	15 August 2015	Twickenham Stadium, London	19–14	England	2015 Rugby World Cup warm-up match
101	22 August 2015	Stade de France, Saint-Denis	25–20	France	2015 Rugby World Cup warm-up match
102	19 March 2016	Stade de France, Saint-Denis	21–31	England	2016 Six Nations Championship
103	4 February 2017	Twickenham Stadium, London	19–16	England	2017 Six Nations Championship
104	10 March 2018	Stade de France, Saint-Denis	22–16	France	2018 Six Nations Championship
105	10 February 2019	Twickenham Stadium, London	44–8	England	2019 Six Nations Championship
106	2 February 2020	Stade de France, Saint-Denis	24–17	France	2020 Six Nations Championship
107	6 December 2020	Twickenham Stadium, London	22–19	England (Note: Match drawn 19–19 during normal time but won by England after extra-time. Counted as a win in records due to tournament format)	Autumn Nations Cup Final
108	13 March 2021	Twickenham Stadium, London	23–20	England	2021 Six Nations Championship
109	20 March 2022	Stade de France, Saint-Denis	25–13	France	2022 Six Nations Championship
110	11 March 2023	Twickenham Stadium, London	10–53	France	2023 Six Nations Championship
111	16 March 2024	Parc Olympique Lyonnais, Lyon	33–31	France	2024 Six Nations Championship
112	8 February 2025	Twickenham Stadium, London	26–25	England	2025 Six Nations Championship
113	14 March 2026	Stade de France, Saint-Denis	48–46	France	2026 Six Nations Championship

== Non-test results ==
Below is a list of matches that were not awarded test match status and so do not appear in the list of official statistics.

No.	Date	Venue	Score	Winner	Competition	Ref.
1	20 April 1974	Twickenham Stadium, London	7–26	France XV	Paris Air Disaster fund raiser	
2	12 October 2019	International Stadium Yokohama, Yokohama (Japan)	0–0	draw (Note: The 2019 Rugby World Cup match between the two sides was cancelled due to Typhoon Hagibis and awarded in the tournament as a 0–0 draw.)	2019 Rugby World Cup	
3	21 June 2025	Twickenham Stadium, London	24–26	France XV	2025 France tour of New Zealand warm-up match	
4	19 June 2026	Stade De La Rabine, Vannes	35–19	France XV	2026 Nations Championship warm-up match	

== List of series ==
Played	Won by England	Won by France	Drawn
4	4	0	0

Year	England	France	Series winner
1906	1	—N/a	England
1907	1	—N/a	England
1908	1	—N/a	England
1909	1	—N/a	England
