= Brian Wightman =

Brian Wightman may refer to:

- Brian Wightman (politician) (born 1976), Australian politician who served as Attorney-General of Tasmania
- Brian Wightman (rugby union) (1936–1999), English rugby union player for sports administrator
