= Quilter plc =

British financial services company

- Type: Public limited company
- Traded as: LSE: QLT; FTSE 250 component; JSE: QLT
- Industry: Wealth management
- Founded: 2018
- Headquarters: London, England
- Key people: Ruth Markland (Chair); Steven Levin (CEO)
- Products: Asset management Wealth Management; Life insurance Savings and investment
- Revenue: ▲£9,364 million (2025)
- Operating income: ▲£324 million (2025)
- Net income: ▲£120 million (2025)
- AUM: ▲£141.2 billion (2025)
- Total assets: ▲£76.542 billion (2025)
- Total equity: ▲£1.466 billion (2025)
- Number of employees: 3,000 (2026)
- Website: www.quilter.com

Quilter plc, formerly known as Old Mutual Wealth Management Limited, is a British wealth management company. It is listed on the London Stock Exchange and is a constituent of the FTSE 250 Index. The stock has a secondary listing on the Johannesburg Stock Exchange (JSE).

== History ==
Quilter traces its origins back to William Morris & Sons, a firm of stockbrokers formed in 1771. It also incorporates the legacy of Skandia, an early provider of investment platforms in the UK market launched in 1979.

In March 2016, Old Mutual plc announced its managed separation strategy that sought to unlock and create value for shareholders through the separation of its four businesses, Old Mutual Emerging Markets, Nedbank, UK-based Old Mutual Wealth and Boston-based Old Mutual Asset Management (OMAM) into standalone entities.

In November 2017, Old Mutual Wealth announced its intention to rebrand as Quilter plc and to list its shares on the London Stock Exchange (LSE) with secondary listings on the Johannesburg, Namibia, Malawi and Zimbabwe Stock Exchanges.

The firm selected Goldman Sachs, JP Morgan and Bank of America Merrill Lynch to lead its initial public offering which took place in June 2018 and was estimated to have valued the company at $3.35 billion.

== Sponsorship ==
Since 2015, Quilter, and previously Old Mutual Wealth before then, have sponsored several rugby union events. In 2018, the winner of an annual fixture between England and the Barbarians was renamed the Quilter Cup. In 2025, Quilter was announced as the title sponsor for the 2025 Nations Series having been re-branded from the Autumn Internationals.

== Activities ==
The company operates through various platforms, including Quilter Investment Platform, Quilter Investors, Quilter Financial Planning, Quilter Cheviot and Quilter Invest.

== See also ==
- Old Mutual
- UAP Old Mutual Holdings
- Nedbank
- Real People Group
