= List of England national rugby union team results 2010–2019 =

These are the list of results that England have played from 2010 to 2019.

== 2010 ==
Scores and results list England's points tally first.

Date	Opposition	For	Against	Venue	Winner	Status
06/02/2010	Wales	30	17	Twickenham, London	England	Six Nations
14/02/2010	Italy	17	12	Stadio Flaminio, Rome	England	Six Nations
27/02/2010	Ireland	16	20	Twickenham, London	Ireland	Six Nations
13/03/2010	Scotland	15	15	Murrayfield, Edinburgh	draw	Six Nations
20/03/2010	France	10	12	Stade de France, Saint-Denis	France	Six Nations
12/06/2010	Australia	17	27	Subiaco Oval, Perth	Australia	First Test
19/06/2010	Australia	21	20	ANZ Stadium, Sydney	England	Second Test
06/11/2010	New Zealand	16	26	Twickenham, London	New Zealand	Test Match
13/11/2010	Australia	35	18	Twickenham, London	England	Test Match
20/11/2010	Samoa	26	13	Twickenham, London	England	Test Match
27/11/2010	South Africa	11	21	Twickenham, London	South Africa	Test Match

45.45% winning rate for 2010.

== 2011 ==
Scores and results list England's points tally first.

Date	Opposition	For	Against	Venue	Winner	Status
04/02/2011	Wales	26	19	Millennium Stadium, Cardiff	England	Six Nations
12/02/2011	Italy	59	13	Twickenham, London	England	Six Nations
26/02/2011	France	17	9	Twickenham, London	England	Six Nations
13/03/2011	Scotland	22	16	Twickenham, London	England	Six Nations
19/03/2011	Ireland	8	24	Aviva Stadium, Dublin	Ireland	Six Nations
06/08/2011	Wales	23	19	Twickenham, London	England	Test Match
13/08/2011	Wales	9	19	Millennium Stadium, Cardiff	Wales	Test Match
27/08/2011	Ireland	20	9	Aviva Stadium, Dublin	England	Test Match
10/09/2011	Argentina	13	9	Otago Stadium, Dunedin	England	2011 Rugby World Cup
18/09/2011	Georgia	41	10	Otago Stadium, Dunedin	England	2011 Rugby World Cup
24/09/2011	Romania	67	3	Otago Stadium, Dunedin	England	2011 Rugby World Cup
01/10/2011	Scotland	16	12	Eden Park, Auckland	England	2011 Rugby World Cup
08/10/2011	France	12	19	Eden Park, Auckland	France	2011 Rugby World Cup

76.92% winning rate for 2011.

== 2012 ==
Scores and results list England's points tally first.

Date	Opposition	For	Against	Venue	Winner	Status
04/02/2012	Scotland	13	6	Murrayfield, Edinburgh	England	Six Nations
11/02/2012	Italy	19	15	Stadio Olimpico, Rome	England	Six Nations
25/02/2012	Wales	12	19	Twickenham, London	Wales	Six Nations
11/03/2012	France	24	22	Stade de France, Saint-Denis	England	Six Nations
17/03/2012	Ireland	30	9	Twickenham, London	England	Six Nations
09/06/2012	South Africa	17	22	Kings Park Stadium, Durban	South Africa	2012 tour
16/06/2012	South Africa	27	36	Ellis Park Stadium, Johannesburg	South Africa	2012 tour
23/06/2012	South Africa	14	14	Nelson Mandela Bay Stadium, Port Elizabeth	draw	2012 tour
10/11/2012	Fiji	54	12	Twickenham, London	England	Test match
17/11/2012	Australia	14	20	Twickenham, London	Australia	Test match
24/11/2012	South Africa	15	16	Twickenham, London	South Africa	Test match
01/12/2012	New Zealand	38	21	Twickenham, London	England	Test match

50% winning rate for 2012.

== 2013 ==
Scores and results list England's points tally first.

Date	Opposition	For	Against	Venue	Winner	Status
02/02/2013	Scotland	38	18	Twickenham, London	England	Six Nations
10/02/2013	Ireland	12	6	Aviva Stadium, Dublin	England	Six Nations
23/02/2013	France	23	13	Twickenham, London	England	Six Nations
9/03/2013	Italy	18	11	Twickenham, London	England	Six Nations
16/03/2013	Wales	3	30	Millennium Stadium, Cardiff	Wales	Six Nations
08/06/2013	Argentina	32	3	Estadio Padre Ernesto Martearena, Salta	England	First Test
15/06/2013	Argentina	51	26	Estadio José Amalfitani, Buenos Aires	England	Second Test
02/11/2013	Australia	20	13	Twickenham, London	England	Test match
09/11/2013	Argentina	31	12	Twickenham, London	England	Test match
16/11/2013	New Zealand	22	30	Twickenham, London	New Zealand	Test match

80% winning rate for 2013.

== 2014 ==
Scores and results list England's points tally first.

Date	Opposition	For	Against	Venue	Winner	Status
01/02/2014	France	24	26	Stade de France, Paris	France	Six Nations
8/02/2014	Scotland	20	0	Murrayfield, Edinburgh	England	Six Nations
22/02/2014	Ireland	13	10	Twickenham, London	England	Six Nations
09/03/2014	Wales	29	18	Twickenham, London	England	Six Nations
15/03/2014	Italy	52	11	Stadio Olimpico, Rome	England	Six Nations
07/06/2014	New Zealand	15	20	Eden Park, Auckland	New Zealand	First Test
14/06/2014	New Zealand	27	28	Forsyth Barr Stadium, Dunedin	New Zealand	Second Test
21/06/2014	New Zealand	13	36	Waikato Stadium, Hamilton	New Zealand	Third Test
08/11/2014	New Zealand	21	24	Twickenham, London	New Zealand	Test match
15/11/2014	South Africa	28	31	Twickenham, London	South Africa	Test match
22/11/2014	Samoa	28	9	Twickenham, London	England	Test match
29/11/2014	Australia	26	17	Twickenham, London	England	Test match

50% winning rate for 2014.

== 2015 ==
Scores and results list England's points tally first.

Date	Opposition	For	Against	Venue	Winner	Status
06/02/2015	Wales	21	16	Millennium Stadium, Cardiff	England	Six Nations
14/02/2015	Italy	47	17	Twickenham, London	England	Six Nations
01/03/2015	Ireland	9	19	Aviva Stadium, Dublin	Ireland	Six Nations
14/03/2015	Scotland	25	13	Twickenham, London	England	Six Nations
21/03/2015	France	55	35	Twickenham, London	England	Six Nations
15/08/2015	France	19	14	Twickenham, London	England	Test Match
22/08/2015	France	20	25	Stade de France, Saint-Denis	France	Test Match
05/09/2015	Ireland	21	13	Twickenham, London	England	Test Match
18/09/2015	Fiji	35	11	Twickenham, London	England	2015 Rugby World Cup
26/09/2015	Wales	25	28	Twickenham, London	Wales	2015 Rugby World Cup
03/10/2015	Australia	13	33	Twickenham, London	Australia	2015 Rugby World Cup
10/10/2015	Uruguay	60	3	Etihad Stadium, Manchester	England	2015 Rugby World Cup

66.67% winning rate for 2015.

== 2016 ==
Scores and results list England's points tally first.

Date	Opposition	For	Against	Venue	Winner	Status
06/02/2016	Scotland	15	9	Murrayfield, Edinburgh	England	Six Nations
14/02/2016	Italy	40	9	Stadio Olimpico, Rome	England	Six Nations
27/02/2016	Ireland	21	10	Twickenham, London	England	Six Nations
12/03/2016	Wales	25	21	Twickenham, London	England	Six Nations
19/03/2016	France	31	21	Stade de France, Saint-Denis	England	Six Nations
29/05/2016	Wales	27	13	Twickenham, London	England	Old Mutual Wealth Cup
11/06/2016	Australia	39	28	Suncorp Stadium, Brisbane,	England	2016 England rugby union tour of Australia
18/06/2016	Australia	23	7	AAMI Park, Melbourne,	England	2016 England rugby union tour of Australia
25/06/2016	Australia	44	40	Sydney Football Stadium, Sydney	England	2016 England rugby union tour of Australia
12/11/2016	South Africa	37	21	Twickenham, London	England	Test match
19/11/2016	Fiji	58	15	Twickenham, London	England	Test match
26/11/2016	Argentina	27	14	Twickenham, London	England	Test match
03/12/2016	Australia	37	21	Twickenham, London	England	Test match

100% winning rate for 2016.

== 2017 ==
Scores and results list England's points tally first.

Date	Opposition	For	Against	Venue	Winner	Status
04/02/2017	France	19	16	Twickenham, London	England	Six Nations
11/02/2017	Wales	21	16	Millennium Stadium, Cardiff	England	Six Nations
26/02/2017	Italy	36	15	Twickenham, London	England	Six Nations
11/03/2017	Scotland	61	21	Twickenham, London	England	Six Nations
18/03/2017	Ireland	9	13	Aviva Stadium, Dublin	Ireland	Six Nations
28/05/2017	Barbarians F.C.	28	14	Twickenham, London	England	Old Mutual Wealth Cup
10/06/2017	Argentina	38	34	Estadio San Juan del Bicentenario, San Juan	England	2017 England rugby union tour of Argentina
17/06/2017	Argentina	35	25	Estadio Brigadier General Estanislao López, Santa Fe	England	2017 England rugby union tour of Argentina
11/11/2017	Argentina	21	8	Twickenham, London	England	Test match
18/11/2017	Australia	30	6	Twickenham, London	England	Test match
25/11/2017	Samoa	48	14	Twickenham, London	England	Test match

- Barbarians F.C. is classed as a non-capped match

90.90% winning rate for 2017.

== 2018 ==
Scores and results list England's points tally first.

Date	Opposition	For	Against	Venue	Winner	Status
04/02/2018	Italy	46	15	Stadio Olimpico, Rome	England	Six Nations
10/02/2018	Wales	12	6	Twickenham, London	England	Six Nations
24/02/2018	Scotland	13	25	Murrayfield Stadium, Edinburgh	Scotland	Six Nations
10/03/2018	France	16	22	Stade de France, Saint-Denis	France	Six Nations
17/03/2018	Ireland	15	24	Twickenham, London	Ireland	Six Nations
27/05/2018	Barbarians F.C.	45	63	Twickenham, London	Barbarians F.C.	Quilter Cup
09/06/2018	South Africa	39	42	Ellis Park Stadium, Johannesburg	South Africa	2018 England rugby union tour of South Africa
16/06/2018	South Africa	12	23	Free State Stadium, Bloemfontein	South Africa	2018 England rugby union tour of South Africa
23/06/2018	South Africa	25	10	Newlands Stadium, Cape Town	England	2018 England rugby union tour of South Africa
03/11/2018	South Africa	12	11	Twickenham, London	England	Test match
10/11/2018	New Zealand	15	16	Twickenham, London	New Zealand	Test match
17/11/2018	Japan	35	15	Twickenham, London	England	Test match
24/11/2018	Australia	37	18	Twickenham, London	England	Test match

- Barbarians F.C. is classed as a non-cap match

46.15% winning rate for 2018.

== 2019 ==
Scores and results list England's points tally first.

Date	Opposition	For	Against	Venue	Winner	Status
02/02/2019	Ireland	32	20	Aviva Stadium, Dublin	England	Six Nations
10/02/2019	France	44	8	Twickenham, London	England	Six Nations
23/02/2019	Wales	13	21	Millennium Stadium, Cardiff	Wales	Six Nations
09/03/2019	Italy	57	14	Twickenham, London	England	Six Nations
16/03/2019	Scotland	38	38	Twickenham, London	Draw	Six Nations
02/06/2019	Barbarians F.C.	51	43	Twickenham, London	England	Quilter Cup
11/08/2019	Wales	33	19	Twickenham, London	England	Test Match
17/08/2019	Wales	6	13	Millennium Stadium, Cardiff	Wales	Test Match
24/08/2019	Ireland	57	15	Twickenham, London	England	Test Match
06/09/2019	Italy	37	0	St James' Park, Newcastle upon Tyne	England	Test Match
22/09/2019	Tonga	35	3	Sapporo Dome, Sapporo	England	2019 Rugby World Cup
26/09/2019	USA	45	7	Noevir Stadium, Kobe	England	2019 Rugby World Cup
05/10/2019	Argentina	39	10	Ajinomoto Stadium, Chōfu	England	2019 Rugby World Cup
12/10/2019	France	–	–	Nissan Stadium, Yokohama	–	2019 Rugby World Cup
19/10/2019	Australia	40	16	Showa Denko Dome, Ōita	England	2019 Rugby World Cup
26/10/2019	New Zealand	19	7	Nissan Stadium, Yokohama	England	2019 Rugby World Cup
02/11/2019	South Africa	12	32	Nissan Stadium, Yokohama	South Africa	2019 Rugby World Cup

- Barbarians F.C. is classed as a non-cap match
- England vs France was cancelled and declared a 0-0 draw, in the Rugby World Cup only, as a result of Typhoon Hagibis. No official caps were awarded or result recorded outside of the World Cup.

71% winning rate for 2019.

== Year Box ==
Preceded by 2000–2009	England Rugby Results; 2010–2019	Succeeded by 2020–2029
