= Fenwick Allison =

English rugby union player

- Full name: Dennis Fenwick Allison
- Born: 20 April 1931 Tynemouth, England
- Died: 14 April 2009 (aged 77) Leeds, England
- School: Dame Allan's School
- University: King's College, Newcastle

Rugby union career
- Position: Fullback
International career
Years	Team	Apps	(Points)
1956–58	England	7	(15)

Dennis Fenwick Allison (20 April 1931 – 14 April 2009) was an English international rugby union player.

Born in Tynemouth, Northumberland, Allison was educated at Dame Allan's School and King's College, Newcastle, where he studied for a degree in metallurgy while playing club rugby for Northern.

Allison, a left-footed fullback, moved to the Midlands in 1955 and signed with Coventry.

From 1956 to 1958, Allison was capped seven times as a fullback by England. He appeared in all four matches of England's 1956 Five Nations campaign and contributed to the 1957 Five Nations grand slam with a first-half penalty goal in their tournament opener against Wales in Cardiff, which was the only score of a 3–0 win.

Allison captained the Warwickshire side that won the 1957–58 County Championship.

== See also ==
- List of England national rugby union players
