= John Thorne (rugby union) =

England international rugby union player

- Full name: John David Thorne
- Born: 1 January 1934 Bristol, England
- Died: 25 October 2008 (aged 74) Bristol, England

Rugby union career
- Position: Hooker
International career
Years	Team	Apps	(Points)
1963	England	3	(0)

John David Thorne (1 January 1934 – 25 October 2008) was an English international rugby union player.

Born and raised in Bristol, Thorne attended Speedwell School and was a military policeman during his national service, which included an 18-month posting to Austria.

Thorne was a powerful, mobile hooker, produced by the Cleve RFC of Bristol. Most of his career was spent with the Bristol Football Club and he was capped three times for England in their title-winning 1963 Five Nations campaign. He retained his place for that year's tour of Australasia, although he didn't add any further caps. At county level, Thorne represented both Gloucestershire and Western Counties.

== See also ==
- List of England national rugby union players
