= List of England national rugby union team results 1970–1979 =

The following are the list of results that England have played from 1970 to 1979.

== 1970 ==
Scores and results list England's points tally first.

Opposing teams	For	Against	Date	Venue	Status
Ireland	9	3	14/02/1970	Twickenham, London	Five Nations
Wales	13	17	28/02/1970	Twickenham, London	Five Nations
Scotland	5	14	21/03/1970	Murrayfield, Edinburgh	Five Nations
France	13	35	18/04/1970	Stade Colombes, Paris	Five Nations

== 1971 ==
Scores and results list England's points tally first.

Opposing teams	For	Against	Date	Venue	Status
Wales	6	22	16/01/1971	Cardiff Arms Park, Cardiff	Five Nations
Ireland	9	6	13/02/1971	Lansdowne Road, Dublin	Five Nations
France	14	14	27/02/1971	Twickenham, London	Five Nations
Scotland	15	16	20/03/1971	Twickenham, London	Five Nations
Scotland	6	26	27/03/1971	Murrayfield, Edinburgh	RFU Centenary Match
RFU President's Overseas XV	11	28	17/04/1971	Twickenham, London	RFU Centenary Match

== 1972 ==
Scores and results list England's points tally first.

Opposing teams	For	Against	Date	Venue	Status
Wales	3	12	15/01/1972	Twickenham, London	Five Nations
Ireland	12	16	12/02/1972	Twickenham, London	Five Nations
France	12	37	26/02/1972	Stade Colombes, Paris	Five Nations
Scotland	9	23	18/03/1972	Murrayfield, Edinburgh	Five Nations
South Africa	18	9	03/06/1972	Ellis Park, Johannesburg	Test Match

== 1973 ==
Scores and results list England's points tally first.

Opposing teams	For	Against	Date	Venue	Status
New Zealand	0	9	06/01/1973	Twickenham, London	Test Match
Wales	9	25	20/01/1973	Cardiff Arms Park, Cardiff	Five Nations
Ireland	9	18	10/02/1973	Lansdowne Road, Dublin	Five Nations
France	14	6	24/02/1973	Twickenham, London	Five Nations
Scotland	20	13	17/03/1973	Twickenham, London	Five Nations
New Zealand	10	6	15/09/1973	Eden Park, Auckland	Test Match
Australia	20	3	17/11/1973	Twickenham, London	Test Match

== 1974 ==
Scores and results list England's points tally first.

Opposing teams	For	Against	Date	Venue	Status
Scotland	14	16	02/02/1974	Murrayfield, Edinburgh	Five Nations
Ireland	21	26	16/02/1974	Twickenham, London	Five Nations
France	12	12	02/03/1974	Parc des Princes, Paris	Five Nations
Wales	16	12	16/03/1974	Twickenham, London	Five Nations

== 1975 ==
Scores and results list England's points tally first.

Opposing teams	For	Against	Date	Venue	Status
Ireland	9	12	18/01/1975	Lansdowne Road, Dublin	Five Nations
France	20	27	01/02/1975	Twickenham, London	Five Nations
Wales	4	20	15/02/1975	Cardiff Arms Park, Cardiff	Five Nations
Scotland	7	6	15/03/1975	Twickenham, London	Five Nations
Australia	9	16	24/05/1975	Sydney Cricket Ground, Sydney	First Test
Australia	21	30	31/05/1975	Ballymore, Brisbane	Second Test

== 1976 ==
Scores and results list England's points tally first.

Opposing teams	For	Against	Date	Venue	Status
Australia	23	6	03/01/1976	Twickenham, London	Test Match
Wales	9	21	17/01/1976	Twickenham, London	Five Nations
Scotland	12	22	21/02/1976	Murrayfield, Edinburgh	Five Nations
Ireland	12	13	06/03/1976	Twickenham, London	Five Nations
France	9	30	20/03/1976	Parc des Princes, Paris	Five Nations

== 1977 ==
Scores and results list England's points tally first.

Opposing teams	For	Against	Date	Venue	Status
Scotland	26	6	15/01/1977	Twickenham, London	Five Nations
Ireland	4	0	05/02/1977	Lansdowne Road, Dublin	Five Nations
France	3	4	19/02/1977	Twickenham, London	Five Nations
Wales	9	14	05/03/1977	Cardiff Arms Park, Cardiff	Five Nations

== 1978 ==
Scores and results list England's points tally first.

Opposing teams	For	Against	Date	Venue	Status
France	6	15	21/01/1978	Parc des Princes, Paris	Five Nations
Wales	6	9	04/02/1978	Twickenham, London	Five Nations
Scotland	15	0	04/03/1978	Murrayfield, Edinburgh	Five Nations
Ireland	15	9	18/03/1978	Twickenham, London	Five Nations
New Zealand	6	16	25/11/1978	Twickenham, London	Test Match

== 1979 ==
Scores and results list England's points tally first.

Opposing teams	For	Against	Date	Venue	Status
Scotland	20	13	03/02/1979	Twickenham, London	Five Nations
Ireland	7	12	17/02/1979	Lansdowne Road, Dublin	Five Nations
France	7	6	03/03/1979	Twickenham, London	Five Nations
Wales	3	27	17/03/1979	Cardiff Arms Park, Cardiff	Five Nations
New Zealand	9	10	24/11/1979	Twickenham, London	Test Match

== Year box ==
Preceded by 1960–1969	England Rugby Results; 1970–1979	Succeeded by 1980–1989
