= John Price (rugby union) =

England international rugby union player (born 1938)

- Born: 1 July 1938 (age 88)
- Height: 6 ft 4 in (1.93 m)

Rugby union career
- Position: Lock
International career
Years	Team	Apps	(Points)
1961	England	1	(0)

John Price (born 1 July 1938) is an English former international rugby union player.

Price was a Coventry and Warwickshire player, capped once by England, as a lock against Ireland at Lansdowne Road in the 1961 Five Nations Championship. Due to a shoulder ligament injury suffered in a subsequent club game for Coventry, Price had to withdraw from England's next Five Nations fixture against France.

== See also ==
- List of England national rugby union players
