= Brian Neill (rugby union) =

- Full name: John Brian Neill
- Born: 28 July 1937 Edinburgh, Scotland
- Died: 26 June 2006 (aged 68) Edinburgh, Scotland

Rugby union career
- Position: Prop
International career
Years	Team	Apps	(Points)
1963–65	Scotland	7	(0)

John Brian Neill (28 July 1937 — 26 June 2006) was a Scottish international rugby union captain.

A native of Edinburgh, Neill was a prop with Edinburgh Accies, for which he made his firsts debut at age 16.

Neill took over as Scotland captain on the eve of their 1964 Five Nations campaign. He had only one prior cap to his name at the time, against England a year earlier, and it was suggested he had been given the position because he could speak French. Under Neill's captaincy, Scotland won three of their four matches, to finish joint Five Nations champions with Wales, while also securing a 0–0 draw against the visiting All Blacks. He remained in charge for the opening match of the 1965 Five Nations, then lost his place due to a foot and didn't feature again for Scotland.

== See also ==
- List of Scotland national rugby union players
