= List of England national rugby union team results 1890–1899 =

This is a list of results that England have played from 1890 to 1899.

A standard points scoring system was only implemented from 1891.

== 1890 ==
Scores and results list England's points tally first.

Opposing Teams	For	Against	Date	Venue	Status
Wales	0	1T	15/02/1890	Crown Flatt, Dewsbury	Home Nations Championship
Scotland	1G 1T	0	01/03/1890	Raeburn Place, Edinburgh	Home Nations Championship
Ireland	3T	0	15/03/1890	Rectory Field, Blackheath	Home Nations Championship

== 1891 ==
Scores and results list England's points tally first.

Opposing Teams	For	Against	Date	Venue	Status
Wales	7	3	03/01/1891	Rodney Parade, Newport	Home Nations Championship
Ireland	9	0	07/02/1891	Lansdowne Road, Dublin	Home Nations Championship
Scotland	3	9	07/03/1891	Athletic Ground, Richmond	Home Nations Championship

== 1892 ==
Scores and results list England's points tally first.

Opposing Teams	For	Against	Date	Venue	Status
Wales	17	0	02/01/1892	Rectory Field, Blackheath	Home Nations Championship
Ireland	7	0	06/02/1892	Whalley Range, Manchester	Home Nations Championship
Scotland	5	0	05/03/1892	Raeburn Place, Edinburgh	Home Nations Championship

== 1893 ==
Scores and results list England's points tally first.

Opposing Teams	For	Against	Date	Venue	Status
Wales	11	12	07/01/1893	Cardiff Arms Park, Cardiff	Home Nations Championship
Ireland	4	0	04/02/1893	Lansdowne Road, Dublin	Home Nations Championship
Scotland	0	8	04/03/1893	Headingley, Leeds	Home Nations Championship

== 1894 ==
Scores and results list England's points tally first.

Opposing Teams	For	Against	Date	Venue	Status
Wales	24	3	06/01/1894	Birkenhead Park, Birkenhead	Home Nations Championship
Ireland	5	7	03/02/1894	Rectory Field, Blackheath	Home Nations Championship
Scotland	0	6	17/03/1894	Raeburn Place, Edinburgh	Home Nations Championship

== 1895 ==
Scores and results list England's points tally first.

Opposing Teams	For	Against	Date	Venue	Status
Wales	14	6	05/01/1895	St. Helen's, Swansea	Home Nations Championship
Ireland	6	3	02/02/1895	Lansdowne Road, Dublin	Home Nations Championship
Scotland	3	6	09/03/1895	Athletic Ground, Richmond	Home Nations Championship

== 1896 ==
Scores and results list England's points tally first.

Opposing Teams	For	Against	Date	Venue	Status
Wales	25	0	04/01/1896	Rectory Field, Blackheath	Home Nations Championship
Ireland	4	10	01/02/1896	Meanwood Road, Leeds	Home Nations Championship
Scotland	0	11	14/03/1896	Hampden Park, Glasgow	Home Nations Championship

== 1897 ==
Scores and results list England's points tally first.

Opposing Teams	For	Against	Date	Venue	Status
Wales	0	11	09/01/1897	Rodney Parade, Newport	Home Nations Championship
Ireland	9	13	06/02/1897	Lansdowne Road, Dublin	Home Nations Championship
Scotland	12	3	13/03/1897	Whalley Range, Manchester	Home Nations Championship

== 1898 ==
Scores and results list England's points tally first.

Opposing Teams	For	Against	Date	Venue	Status
Ireland	6	9	05/02/1898	Athletic Ground, Richmond	Home Nations Championship
Scotland	3	3	12/03/1898	Powderhall, Edinburgh	Home Nations Championship
Wales	14	7	02/04/1898	Rectory Field, Blackheath	Home Nations Championship

== 1899 ==
Scores and results list England's points tally first.

Opposing Teams	For	Against	Date	Venue	Status
Wales	3	26	07/01/1899	St. Helen's, Swansea	Home Nations Championship
Ireland	0	6	04/02/1899	Lansdowne Road, Dublin	Home Nations Championship
Scotland	0	5	11/03/1899	Rectory Field, Blackheath	Home Nations Championship

== Year Box ==
Preceded by 1880-1889	England Rugby Results; 1890–1899	Succeeded by 1900-1909

== General references ==
- Woolgar, Jason (2004). England : the official R.F.U. history. London: Virgin. ISBN 1-85227-210-4.
- McGowan, Phil; Steele, Richard (2021). England Rugby: 150 Years. Vision Sports Publishing. ISBN 978-1-913412-09-8.
- "England". Rugby Data Bank.
