= 1965 Five Nations Championship =

Rugby union competition

- Date: 9 January - 27 March 1965
- Countries: England; Ireland; France; Scotland; Wales

Tournament statistics
- Champions: Wales (14th title)
- Triple Crown: Wales (10th title)
- Matches played: 10

The 1965 Five Nations Championship was the thirty-sixth series of the rugby union Five Nations Championship. Including the previous incarnations as the Home Nations and Five Nations, this was the seventy-first series of the northern hemisphere rugby union championship. Ten matches were played between 9 January and 27 March. It was contested by England, France, Ireland, Scotland and Wales.

Wales missed out on a fourth Grand Slam after losing to France at Stade Colombes despite winning the title.

== Participants ==
The teams involved were:

Nation	Venue	City	Head coach	Captain
England	Twickenham	London	none	David Perry
France	Stade Olympique Yves-du-Manoir	Colombes	Jean Prat	Michel Crauste
Ireland	Lansdowne Road	Dublin	none	Ray McLoughlin
Scotland	Murrayfield	Edinburgh	none	Brian Neill/Mike Campbell-Lamerton/Stewart Wilson
Wales	National Stadium	Cardiff	none	Clive Rowlands

== Table ==
Pos	Team	Pld	W	D	L	PF	PA	PD	Pts
1	Wales	4	3	0	1	55	45	+10	6
2	France	4	2	1	1	47	33	+14	5
2	Ireland	4	2	1	1	32	23	+9	5
4	England	4	1	1	2	15	28	−13	3
5	Scotland	4	0	1	3	29	49	−20	1

== Results ==
1965-01-09

France	16–8	Scotland

Paris

1965-01-16

Wales	14–3	England

Cardiff

1965-01-23

Ireland	3–3	France

Dublin

1965-02-06

Scotland	12–14	Wales

Edinburgh

1965-02-13

Ireland	5–0	England

Dublin

1965-02-27

England	9–6	France

London

1965-02-27

Scotland	6–16	Ireland

Edinburgh

1965-03-13

Wales	14–8	Ireland

Cardiff

1965-03-20

England	3–3	Scotland

London

1965-03-20

France	22–13	Wales

Paris
