= Ricky Bartlett (rugby union) =

English rugby union player

- Full name: Richard Michael Bartlett
- Born: 13 February 1929 Kingston upon Thames, Surrey, England
- Died: 6 March 1984 (aged 55) Liss, Hampshire, England

Rugby union career
- Position: Fly-half
International career
Years	Team	Apps	(Points)
1957–58	England	7	(0)

Richard Michael Bartlett (13 February 1929 – 6 March 1984) was an English international rugby union player.

Born in Kingston upon Thames, Barlett was educated at Stowe School and undertook further studies at the University of Cambridge, where he attained blues. He also played rugby union for Harlequins.

Barlett made the England squad for the 1957 Five Nations and received news of his call up on the same morning his daughter was born. He was fly-half in all England's fixtures, helping them achieve the grand slam, then gained a further three caps in 1958, as they again claimed the championship, to finish with six wins and a draw from his seven caps.

== See also ==
- List of England national rugby union players
