= List of England national rugby union team results 1910–1914 =

This is a list of results that England have played from 1910 to 1914.

== 1910 ==
Scores and results list England's points tally first.

Opposing Teams	For	Against	Date	Venue	Status
Wales	11	6	15/01/1910	Twickenham, London	Five Nations Championship
Ireland	0	0	12/02/1910	Twickenham, London	Five Nations Championship
France	11	3	10/03/1910	Parc des Princes, Paris	Five Nations Championship
Scotland	14	5	19/03/1910	Inverleith, Edinburgh	Five Nations Championship

== 1911 ==
Scores and results list England's points tally first.

Opposing Teams	For	Against	Date	Venue	Status
Wales	11	15	21/01/1911	St. Helen's, Swansea	Five Nations Championship
France	37	0	28/01/1911	Twickenham, London	Five Nations Championship
Ireland	0	3	11/02/1911	Lansdowne Road, Dublin	Five Nations Championship
Scotland	13	8	18/03/1911	Twickenham, London	Five Nations Championship

== 1912 ==
Scores and results list England's points tally first.

Opposing Teams	For	Against	Date	Venue	Status
Wales	8	0	20/01/1912	Twickenham, London	Five Nations Championship
Ireland	15	0	10/02/1912	Twickenham, London	Five Nations Championship
Scotland	3	8	16/03/1912	Inverleith, Edinburgh	Five Nations Championship
France	18	8	10/03/1900	Parc des Princes, Paris	Five Nations Championship

== 1913 ==
Scores and results list England's points tally first.

Opposing Teams	For	Against	Date	Venue	Status
South Africa	3	9	04/01/1913	Twickenham, London	Test Match
Wales	12	0	18/01/1913	Cardiff Arms Park, Cardiff	Five Nations Championship
France	20	0	25/01/1913	Twickenham, London	Five Nations Championship
Ireland	15	4	08/02/1913	Lansdowne Road, Dublin	Five Nations Championship
Scotland	3	0	15/03/1913	Twickenham, London	Five Nations Championship

== 1914 ==
Scores and results list England's points tally first.

Opposing Teams	For	Against	Date	Venue	Status
Wales	10	9	17/01/1914	Twickenham, London	Five Nations Championship
Ireland	17	12	14/02/1914	Twickenham, London	Five Nations Championship
Scotland	16	15	21/03/1914	Inverleith, Edinburgh	Five Nations Championship
France	39	13	13/04/1914	Stade Colombes, Paris	Five Nations Championship

== Year Box ==
Preceded by 1900-1909	England Rugby Results; 1910–1914	Succeeded by 1920-1929

== General references ==
- Woolgar, Jason (2004). England : the official R.F.U. history. London: Virgin. ISBN 1-85227-210-4.
- McGowan, Phil; Steele, Richard (2021). England Rugby: 150 Years. Vision Sports Publishing. ISBN 978-1-913412-09-8.
- "England". Rugby Data Bank.
