= List of England national rugby union team results 2000–2009 =

This is the list of results that England have played from 2000 to 2009.

== 2000 ==
Scores and results list England's points tally first.

Opposing Teams	For	Against	Date	Venue	Status
Ireland	50	18	05/02/2000	Twickenham, London	Six Nations
France	15	9	19/02/2000	Stade de France, Saint-Denis	Six Nations
Wales	46	12	04/03/2000	Twickenham, London	Six Nations
Italy	59	12	18/03/2000	Stadio Flaminio, Rome	Six Nations
Scotland	13	19	02/04/2000	Murrayfield, Edinburgh	Six Nations
South Africa	13	18	17/06/2000	Loftus Versfeld, Pretoria	First Test
South Africa	27	22	24/06/2000	Vodacom Park, Bloemfontein	Second Test
Australia	22	19	18/11/2000	Twickenham, London	Test Match
Argentina	19	0	25/11/2000	Twickenham, London	Test Match
South Africa	25	17	02/12/2000	Twickenham, London	Test Match

80.00% winning rate for 2000

== 2001 ==
Scores and results list England's points tally first.

Opposing Teams	For	Against	Date	Venue	Status
Wales	44	15	03/02/2001	Millennium Stadium, Cardiff	Six Nations
Italy	80	23	17/02/2001	Twickenham, London	Six Nations
Scotland	43	3	03/03/2001	Twickenham, London	Six Nations
France	48	19	07/04/2001	Twickenham, London	Six Nations
Canada	22	10	02/06/2001	Fletcher's Fields, Markham	First Test
Canada	59	20	09/06/2001	Swangard Stadium, Burnaby	Second Test
U.S.A.	48	19	16/06/2001	Balboa Stadium, San Francisco	Test Match
Ireland	14	20	20/10/2001	Lansdowne Road, Dublin	Six Nations
Australia	21	15	10/11/2001	Twickenham, London	Test Match
Romania	134	0	17/11/2001	Twickenham, London	Test Match
South Africa	29	9	24/11/2001	Twickenham, London	Test Match

90.91% winning rate for 2001

== 2002 ==
Scores and results list England's points tally first.

Opposing Teams	For	Against	Date	Venue	Status
Scotland	29	3	02/02/2002	Murrayfield, Edinburgh	Six Nations
Ireland	45	11	16/02/2002	Twickenham, London	Six Nations
France	15	20	02/03/2002	Stade de France, Saint-Denis	Six Nations
Wales	50	10	23/03/2002	Twickenham, London	Six Nations
Italy	45	9	07/04/2002	Stadio Flaminio, Rome	Six Nations
Argentina	26	18	22/06/2002	José Amalfitani Stadium, Buenos Aires	Test Match
New Zealand	31	28	09/11/2002	Twickenham, London	Test Match
Australia	32	31	16/11/2002	Twickenham, London	Test Match
South Africa	53	3	23/11/2002	Twickenham, London	Test Match

88.89% winning rate for 2002

== 2003 ==
Scores and results list England's points tally first.

Opposing Teams	For	Against	Date	Venue	Status
France	25	17	15/02/2003	Twickenham, London	Six Nations
Wales	26	9	22/02/2003	Millennium Stadium, Cardiff	Six Nations
Italy	40	5	09/03/2003	Twickenham, London	Six Nations
Scotland	40	9	22/03/2003	Twickenham, London	Six Nations
Ireland	42	6	30/03/2003	Lansdowne Road, Dublin	Six Nations
New Zealand	15	13	14/06/2003	Westpac Stadium, Wellington	Test Match
Australia	25	14	21/06/2003	Colonial Stadium, Melbourne	Test Match
Wales	43	9	23/08/2003	Millennium Stadium, Cardiff	Test Match
France	16	17	30/08/2003	Stade Vélodrome, Marseille	First Test
France	45	14	06/09/2003	Twickenham, London	Second Test
Georgia	84	6	12/10/2003	Subiaco Oval, Perth	2003 Rugby World Cup
South Africa	25	6	18/10/2003	Subiaco Oval, Perth	2003 Rugby World Cup
Samoa	35	22	26/10/2003	Colonial Stadium, Melbourne	2003 Rugby World Cup
Uruguay	111	13	02/11/2003	Suncorp Stadium, Brisbane	2003 Rugby World Cup
Wales	28	17	09/11/2003	Suncorp Stadium, Brisbane	2003 Rugby World Cup
France	24	7	16/11/2003	Stadium Australia, Sydney	2003 Rugby World Cup
Australia	20	17	22/11/2003	Stadium Australia, Sydney	2003 Rugby World Cup

94.12% winning rate for 2003

== 2004 ==
Scores and results list England's points tally first.

Opposing Teams	For	Against	Date	Venue	Status
Italy	50	9	15/02/2004	Stadio Flaminio, Rome	Six Nations
Scotland	35	13	21/02/2004	Murrayfield, Edinburgh	Six Nations
Ireland	13	19	06/03/2004	Twickenham, London	Six Nations
Wales	31	21	20/03/2004	Twickenham, London	Six Nations
France	21	24	27/03/2004	Stade de France, Saint-Denis	Six Nations
New Zealand	3	36	12/06/2004	Carisbrook, Dunedin	First Test
New Zealand	12	36	19/06/2004	Eden Park, Auckland	Second Test
Australia	15	51	26/06/2004	Suncorp Stadium, Brisbane	Test Match
Canada	70	0	13/11/2004	Twickenham, London	Test Match
South Africa	32	16	20/11/2004	Twickenham, London	Test Match
Australia	19	21	27/11/2004	Twickenham, London	Test Match

45.45% winning rate for 2004

== 2005 ==
Scores and results list England's points tally first.

Opposing Teams	For	Against	Date	Venue	Status
Wales	9	11	05/02/2005	Millennium Stadium, Cardiff	Six Nations
France	17	18	13/02/2005	Twickenham, London	Six Nations
Ireland	13	19	27/02/2005	Lansdowne Road, Dublin	Six Nations
Italy	39	7	12/03/2005	Twickenham, London	Six Nations
Scotland	43	22	19/03/2005	Twickenham, London	Six Nations
Australia	26	16	12/11/2005	Twickenham, London	Test Match
New Zealand	19	23	19/11/2005	Twickenham, London	Test Match
Samoa	40	3	26/11/2005	Twickenham, London	Test Match

50% winning rate for 2005

== 2006 ==
Scores and results list England's points tally first.

Opposing Teams	For	Against	Date	Venue	Status
Wales	47	13	04/02/2006	Twickenham, London	Six Nations
Italy	31	16	11/02/2006	Stadio Flaminio, Rome	Six Nations
Scotland	12	18	25/02/2006	Murrayfield, Edinburgh	Six Nations
France	6	31	12/03/2006	Stade de France, Saint-Denis	Six Nations
Ireland	24	28	18/03/2006	Twickenham, London	Six Nations
Australia	3	34	11/06/2006	Telstra Stadium, Sydney	First Test
Australia	18	43	17/06/2006	Colonial Stadium, Melbourne	Second Test
New Zealand	20	41	05/11/2006	Twickenham, London	Test Match
Argentina	18	25	11/11/2006	Twickenham, London	Test Match
South Africa	23	21	18/11/2006	Twickenham, London	First Test
South Africa	14	25	25/11/2006	Twickenham, London	Second Test

27.3% winning rate for 2006

== 2007 ==
Scores and results list England's points tally first.

Opposing Teams	For	Against	Date	Venue	Status
Scotland	42	20	03/02/2007	Twickenham, London	Six Nations
Italy	20	7	10/02/2007	Twickenham, London	Six Nations
Ireland	13	43	24/02/2007	Croke Park, Dublin	Six Nations
France	26	18	11/03/2007	Twickenham, London	Six Nations
Wales	18	27	17/03/2007	Millennium Stadium, Cardiff	Six Nations
South Africa	10	58	26/05/2007	Vodacom Park, Bloemfontein	First Test
South Africa	22	55	02/06/2007	Loftus Versfeld, Pretoria	Second Test
Wales	62	5	04/08/2007	Twickenham, London	Test Match
France	15	21	11/08/2007	Twickenham, London	First Test
France	9	22	18/08/2007	Stade Vélodrome, Marseille	Second Test
U.S.A.	28	10	08/09/2007	Stade Félix-Bollaert, Lens	2007 Rugby World Cup
South Africa	0	36	14/09/2007	Stade de France, Saint-Denis	2007 Rugby World Cup
Samoa	44	22	22/09/2007	Stade de la Beaujoire, Nantes	2007 Rugby World Cup
Tonga	36	20	28/09/2007	Parc des Princes, Paris	2007 Rugby World Cup
Australia	12	10	06/10/2007	Stade Vélodrome, Marseille	2007 Rugby World Cup
France	14	9	13/10/2007	Stade de France, Saint-Denis	2007 Rugby World Cup
South Africa	6	15	20/10/2007	Stade de France, Saint-Denis	2007 Rugby World Cup

52.9% winning rate for 2007

== 2008 ==
Scores and results list England's points tally first.

Opposing Teams	For	Against	Date	Venue	Status
Wales	19	26	02/02/2008	Twickenham, London	Six Nations
Italy	23	19	10/02/2008	Stadio Flaminio, Rome	Six Nations
France	24	13	23/02/2008	Stade de France, Saint-Denis	Six Nations
Scotland	9	15	08/03/2008	Murrayfield, Edinburgh	Six Nations
Ireland	33	10	15/03/2008	Twickenham, London	Six Nations
New Zealand	20	37	14/06/2008	Eden Park, Auckland	First Test
New Zealand	12	44	21/06/2008	AMI Stadium, Christchurch	Second Test
Pacific Islanders	39	13	08/11/2008	Twickenham, London	Test Match
Australia	14	28	15/11/2008	Twickenham, London	Test Match
South Africa	6	42	22/11/2008	Twickenham, London	Test Match
New Zealand	6	32	29/11/2008	Twickenham, London	Test Match

36.3% winning rate for 2008

== 2009 ==
Scores and results list England's points tally first.

Opposing Teams	For	Against	Date	Venue	Status
Italy	36	11	07/02/2009	Twickenham, London	Six Nations
Wales	15	23	14/02/2009	Millennium Stadium, Cardiff	Six Nations
Ireland	13	14	28/02/2009	Croke Park, Dublin	Six Nations
France	34	10	15/03/2009	Twickenham, London	Six Nations
Scotland	26	12	21/03/2009	Twickenham, London	Six Nations
Argentina	37	15	06/06/2009	Old Trafford, Manchester	First Test
Argentina	22	24	13/06/2009	Estadio Padre Ernesto Martearena, Salta	Second Test
Australia	9	18	07/11/2009	Twickenham, London	Test Match
Argentina	16	9	14/11/2009	Twickenham, London	Test Match
New Zealand	6	19	21/11/2009	Twickenham, London	Test Match

50% winning rate for 2009

== Year Box ==
Preceded by 1990–1999	England Rugby Results; 2000–2009	Succeeded by 2010–2019
