= Tom Berry (rugby union) =

England international rugby union player

- Born: Joseph Thomas Wade Berry; 17 July 1911 Slawston, Leicestershire, England
- Died: 1 July 1993 (aged 81) Market Harborough, Leicestershire, England
- School: Eastbourne College
- Occupation: Farmer

Rugby union career
- Position: Flanker
Senior career
Years	Team	Apps	(Points)
1932–1948	Leicester Tigers	277	(45)
International career
Years	Team	Apps	(Points)
1939	England	3	(0)

Joseph Thomas Wade Berry (17 July 1911 – 1 July 1993) was a rugby union player and administrator who appeared in 277 games for Leicester Tigers between 1932–1948, and three times for England in 1939. He was President of the Rugby Football Union for the 1968–69 season, the first person from Leicester Tigers to hold the position and was also tour manager of England's first over-seas tour in 1963.

== Playing career ==
Berry made his Leicester Tigers debut on 5 March 1932 against Harlequins at Welford Road, Berry played No. 8 and scored a try as Tigers won 13–11. He was a regular in the team from then until the Second World War, a utility forward he featured in all five positions in back of the forward pack playing at least 24 games in each season.

Berry succeeded Bobby Barr as Leicester captain for the 1938–39 season. Berry made his England debut in the 1939 Home Nations Championship on 21 January 1939 against Wales at Twickenham. He retained his place for the whole championship as England shared the title with Wales and Ireland.

After serving in a reserved capacity during the war Berry returned to captain a much changed club. Berry lead the side in their first post-war fixture against Cardiff with the side featuring 10 debutantes. Tigers lost 12 of their first 17 fixtures but as the new side settled results improved for a seasonal record of 16 wins, 2 draws and 16 defeats.

His final game was against Blackheath at Welford Road on 17 April 1948.

== Administration career ==
Berry represented Leicestershire Rugby Union on the RFU committee from 1953–68 and was an England selector from 1951–1966. As Chairman of Selectors, he was tour manager on England's first overseas tour to Australia and New Zealand in 1963. In 1968 he became Leicester's first President of the RFU.

== Sources ==
- Farmer, Stuart; Hands, David (2014). Tigers - Official history of Leicester Football Club. The Rugby Development Foundation. ISBN 978-0-9930213-0-5.
