= List of England national rugby union team results 1871–1879 =

These are the list of results that England have played from 1871 to 1879.

The first international in international rugby football history was played between Scotland and England at Raeburn Place, in Edinburgh on 27 March 1871. Scotland prevailed by one goal and try to England's one try. A standard points scoring system was at the time undeveloped.

== 1871 ==
Scores and results list England's points tally first.

Opposing Teams	For	Against	Date	Venue	Status	Source
Scotland	1T	1G 1T	27/03/1871	Raeburn Place, Edinburgh	Test Match	

== 1872 ==
Scores and results list England's points tally first.

Opposing Teams	For	Against	Date	Venue	Status
Scotland	1G 1DG 2T	1DG	05/02/1872	Kennington Oval, London	Test Match

== 1873 ==
Scores and results list England's points tally first.

Opposing Teams	For	Against	Date	Venue	Status
Scotland	0	0	03/03/1873	Hamilton Crescent, Glasgow	Test Match

== 1874 ==
Scores and results list England's points tally first.

Opposing Teams	For	Against	Date	Venue	Status
Scotland	1DG	1T	23/02/1874	Kennington Oval, London	Test Match

== 1875 ==
Scores and results list England's points tally first.

Opposing Teams	For	Against	Date	Venue	Status
Ireland	1G 1T 1DG	0	15/02/1875	Kennington Oval, London	Test Match
Scotland	0	0	20/03/1875	Raeburn Place, Edinburgh	Test Match
Ireland	1G 1T	0	13/12/1875	Rathmines, Dublin	Test Match

== 1876 ==
Scores and results list England's points tally first.

Opposing Teams	For	Against	Date	Venue	Status
Scotland	1G 1T	0	06/03/1876	Kennington Oval, London	Test Match

== 1877 ==
Scores and results list England's points tally first.

Opposing Teams	For	Against	Date	Venue	Status
Ireland	2G 2T	0	05/02/1877	Kennington Oval, London	Test Match
Scotland	0	1DG	05/03/1877	Raeburn Place, Edinburgh	Test Match

== 1878 ==
Scores and results list England's points tally first.

Opposing Teams	For	Against	Date	Venue	Status
Scotland	0	0	04/03/1878	Kennington Oval, London	Test Match
Ireland	2G 1T	0	11/03/1878	Lansdowne Road, Dublin	Test Match

== 1879 ==
Scores and results list England's points tally first.

Opposing Teams	For	Against	Date	Venue	Status
Scotland	1G	1DG	10/03/1879	Raeburn Place, Edinburgh	Test Match
Ireland	2G 2T 1DG	0	24/03/1879	Kennington Oval, London	Test Match

== Year Box ==
Preceded by No Matches	England Rugby Results; 1871–1879	Succeeded by 1880-1889

== General references ==
- Woolgar, Jason (2004). England : the official R.F.U. history. London: Virgin. ISBN 1-85227-210-4.
- McGowan, Phil; Steele, Richard (2021). England Rugby: 150 Years. Vision Sports Publishing. ISBN 978-1-913412-09-8.
- "England". Rugby Data Bank.
