= 1963 England rugby union tour of Australasia =

Summary
P	W	D	L
Total
6	1	0	5
Test match
3	0	0	3
Opponent
P	W	D	L
New Zealand
2	0	0	2
Australia
1	0	0	1

The 1963 England rugby union tour of Australasia was the first overseas tour by the England national rugby union team.

Scotland, Ireland and France had preceded England in embarking on short tours to the Southern Hemisphere, and the RFU can be criticised for not having understood that an itinerary of six hard matches including three Test matches in a mere 18 days is somewhat severe, especially when 2 Test matches, against different countries, fall within 4 days at the end of the trip.

== Matches ==
Scores and results list England's points tally first.

Opposing Team	For	Against	Date	Venue	Status
Wellington	14	9	18 May 1963	Athletic Park, Wellington	Tour match
Otago	9	14	22 May 1963	Carisbrook, Dunedin	Tour match
New Zealand	11	21	25 May 1963	Eden Park, Auckland	Test match
Hawke's Bay	5	20	28 May 1963	McLean Park, Napier	Tour match
New Zealand	6	9	1 June 1963	Lancaster Park, Christchurch	Test match
Australia	9	18	4 June 1963	Sportground, Sydney	Test match

== Touring party ==
- Manager: J.T.W. Berry
- Assistant Manager: M.R. Steele-Bodger
- Captain: Mike Weston (Durham City) 16 caps

=== Full back ===
- Roger Hosen (Northampton) No caps

=== Three-quarters ===
- Frank Sykes (Northampton) 2 caps
- Malcolm Phillips (Fylde) 20 caps
- Mike Weston (Durham City) 16 caps
- James Colin Gibson (US Portsmouth) No caps
- John Dee (Hartlepool Rovers) 2 caps
- John Ranson (Rosslyn Park) No caps

=== Half-backs ===
- Phil Horrocks-Taylor (Leicester) 4 caps
- R.F Read (Harlequins) No caps
- Trevor Wintle (St Mary's Hospital) 4 caps
- Simon Clarke (Cambridge University) 4 caps

=== Forwards ===
- Ron Jacobs (Northampton) 22 caps
- Phil Judd (Coventry) 5 caps
- John E. Highton (US Portsmouth) No caps
- Bert Godwin (Coventry) 3 caps
- John Thorne (Bristol) 3 caps
- John Owen (Coventry) 4 caps
- Tom Pargetter (Coventry) 2 caps
- Mike Davis (Torquay Athletic) 3 caps
- Budge Rogers (Bedford) 10 caps
- David Perry (Bedford) 2 caps
- Brian Wightman (Coventry) 3 caps
- Vic Marriott (Harlequins) No caps
