= List of England national rugby union team results 1880–1889 =

These are the list of results that England have played from 1880 to 1889. No fixtures were fulfilled in 1888.

A standard points scoring system was at the time undeveloped.

== 1880 ==
Scores and results list England's points tally first.

Opposing Teams	For	Against	Date	Venue	Status
Ireland	1G 1T	1T	30/01/1880	Lansdowne Road, Dublin	Test Match
Scotland	2G 3T	1G	28/02/1880	Whalley Range, Manchester	Test Match

== 1881 ==
Scores and results list England's points tally first.

Opposing Teams	For	Against	Date	Venue	Status
Ireland	2G 2T	0	05/02/1881	Whalley Range, Manchester	Test Match
Wales	7G 1DG 6T	0	19/02/1881	Rectory Field, Blackheath	Test Match
Scotland	1DG 1T	1G 1T	19/03/1881	Raeburn Place, Edinburgh	Test Match

== 1882 ==
Scores and results list England's points tally first.

Opposing Teams	For	Against	Date	Venue	Status
Ireland	2T	2T	06/02/1882	Lansdowne Road, Dublin	Test Match
Scotland	0	2T	04/03/1882	Whalley Range, Manchester	Test Match
Wales	2G 4T	0	16/12/1882	St. Helen's, Swansea	Home Nations Championship

== 1883 ==
Scores and results list England's points tally first.

Opposing Teams	For	Against	Date	Venue	Status
Ireland	1G 3T	1T	05/02/1883	Whalley Range, Manchester	Home Nations Championship
Scotland	2T	1T	03/03/1883	Raeburn Place, Edinburgh	Home Nations Championship

== 1884 ==
Scores and results list England's points tally first.

Opposing Teams	For	Against	Date	Venue	Status
Wales	1G 2T	1G	05/01/1884	Cardigan Fields, Leeds	Home Nations Championship
Ireland	1G	0	04/02/1884	Lansdowne Road, Dublin	Home Nations Championship
Scotland	1G 1T	0	01/03/1884	Rectory Field, Blackheath	Home Nations Championship

== 1885 ==
Scores and results list England's points tally first.

Opposing Teams	For	Against	Date	Venue	Status
Wales	1G 4T	1G 1T	03/01/1885	St. Helen's, Swansea	Home Nations Championship
Ireland	2T	1T	07/02/1885	Whalley Range, Manchester	Home Nations Championship

== 1886 ==
Scores and results list England's points tally first.

Opposing Teams	For	Against	Date	Venue	Status
Wales	1GM 2T	1G	02/01/1886	Rectory Field, Blackheath	Home Nations Championship
Ireland	1T	0	06/02/1886	Lansdowne Road, Dublin	Home Nations Championship
Scotland	0	0	18/03/1886	Raeburn Place, Edinburgh	Home Nations Championship

== 1887 ==
Scores and results list England's points tally first.

Opposing Teams	For	Against	Date	Venue	Status
Wales	0	0	08/01/1878	Land next to Stradey Park, Llanelli	Home Nations Championship
Ireland	0	2G	05/02/1887	Lansdowne Road, Dublin	Home Nations Championship
Scotland	1T	1T	05/03/1887	Whalley Range, Manchester	Home Nations Championship

== 1888 ==
Home Nations teams refused to play England following the England Rugby Football Union's decision not to join the International Rugby Board .

== 1889 ==
Scores and results list England's points tally first.

Opposing Teams	For	Against	Date	Venue	Status
New Zealand	1G	1T	16/02/1889	Rectory Field, Blackheath	Test Match

== Year Box ==
Preceded by 1871-1879	England Rugby Results; 1880–1889	Succeeded by 1890-1899

== General references ==
- Woolgar, Jason (2004). England : the official R.F.U. history. London: Virgin. ISBN 1-85227-210-4.
- McGowan, Phil; Steele, Richard (2021). England Rugby: 150 Years. Vision Sports Publishing. ISBN 978-1-913412-09-8.
- "England". Rugby Data Bank.
