= List of England national rugby union team results 1990–1999 =

These are the list of results that England have played from 1990 to 1999.

== 1990 ==
Scores and results list England's points tally first.

Opposing Teams	For	Against	Date	Venue	Status
Ireland	23	0	20/01/1990	Twickenham, London	Five Nations
France	26	7	03/02/1990	Parc des Princes, Paris	Five Nations
Wales	34	6	17/02/1990	Twickenham, London	Five Nations
Scotland	7	13	17/03/1990	Murrayfield, Edinburgh	Five Nations
Argentina	25	12	28/07/1990	José Amalfitani Stadium, Buenos Aires	First Test
Argentina	13	15	04/08/1990	José Amalfitani Stadium, Buenos Aires	Second Test
Argentina	51	0	03/11/1990	Twickenham, London	Test Match

== 1991 ==
Scores and results list England's points tally first.

Opposing Teams	For	Against	Date	Venue	Status
Wales	25	6	19/01/1991	Cardiff Arms Park, Cardiff	Five Nations
Scotland	21	12	16/02/1991	Twickenham, London	Five Nations
Ireland	16	7	02/03/1991	Lansdowne Road, Dublin	Five Nations
France	21	19	16/03/1991	Twickenham, London	Five Nations
Fiji	28	12	20/07/1991	National Stadium, Suva	Test Match
Australia	15	40	27/07/1991	Sydney Football Stadium, Sydney	Test Match
New Zealand	12	18	03/10/1991	Twickenham, London	1991 Rugby World Cup
Italy	36	6	08/10/1991	Twickenham, London	1991 Rugby World Cup
U.S.A.	37	9	11/10/1991	Twickenham, London	1991 Rugby World Cup
France	19	10	19/10/1991	Parc des Princes, Paris	1991 Rugby World Cup
Scotland	9	6	26/10/1991	Murrayfield, Edinburgh	1991 Rugby World Cup
Australia	6	12	02/11/1991	Twickenham, London	1991 Rugby World Cup

== 1992 ==
Scores and results list England's points tally first.

Opposing Teams	For	Against	Date	Venue	Status
Scotland	25	7	18/01/1992	Murrayfield, Edinburgh	Five Nations
Ireland	38	9	01/02/1992	Twickenham, London	Five Nations
France	31	13	15/02/1992	Parc des Princes, Paris	Five Nations
Wales	24	0	07/03/1992	Twickenham, London	Five Nations
Canada	26	13	17/10/1992	Wembley Stadium, London	Test Match
South Africa	33	16	14/11/1992	Twickenham, London	Test Match

== 1993 ==
Scores and results list England's points tally first.

Opposing Teams	For	Against	Date	Venue	Status
France	16	15	16/01/1993	Twickenham, London	Five Nations
Wales	9	10	06/02/1993	Cardiff Arms Park, Cardiff	Five Nations
Scotland	26	12	06/03/1993	Twickenham, London	Five Nations
Ireland	3	17	20/03/1993	Lansdowne Road, Dublin	Five Nations
New Zealand	15	9	27/11/1993	Twickenham, London	Test Match

== 1994 ==
Scores and results list England's points tally first.

Opposing Teams	For	Against	Date	Venue	Status
Scotland	15	14	05/02/1994	Murrayfield, Edinburgh	Five Nations
Ireland	12	13	19/02/1994	Twickenham, London	Five Nations
France	18	14	05/03/1994	Parc des Princes, Paris	Five Nations
Wales	15	8	19/03/1994	Twickenham, London	Five Nations
South Africa	32	15	04/06/1994	Loftus Versfeld, Pretoria	First Test
South Africa	9	27	11/06/1994	Newlands, Cape Town	Second Test
Romania	54	3	12/11/1994	Twickenham, London	Test Match
Canada	60	19	10/12/1994	Twickenham, London	Test Match

== 1995 ==
Scores and results list England's points tally first.

Opposing Teams	For	Against	Date	Venue	Status
Ireland	20	8	21/01/1995	Lansdowne Road, Dublin	Five Nations
France	31	10	04/02/1995	Twickenham, London	Five Nations
Wales	23	9	18/02/1995	Cardiff Arms Park, Cardiff	Five Nations
Scotland	24	12	18/03/1995	Twickenham, London	Five Nations
Argentina	24	18	27/05/1995	Kings Park Stadium, Durban	1995 Rugby World Cup
Italy	27	20	31/05/1995	Kings Park Stadium, Durban	1995 Rugby World Cup
Western Samoa	44	22	04/06/1995	Kings Park Stadium, Durban	1995 Rugby World Cup
Australia	25	22	11/06/1995	Newlands, Cape Town	1995 Rugby World Cup
New Zealand	29	45	18/06/1995	Newlands, Cape Town	1995 Rugby World Cup
France	9	19	22/06/1995	Loftus Versfeld, Pretoria	1995 Rugby World Cup
South Africa	14	24	18/11/1995	Twickenham, London	Test Match
Western Samoa	27	9	16/12/1995	Twickenham, London	Test Match

== 1996 ==
Scores and results list England's points tally first.

Opposing Teams	For	Against	Date	Venue	Status
France	12	15	20/01/1996	Parc des Princes, Paris	Five Nations
Wales	21	15	03/02/1996	Twickenham, London	Five Nations
Scotland	18	9	02/03/1996	Murrayfield, Edinburgh	Five Nations
Ireland	28	15	16/03/1996	Twickenham, London	Five Nations
Italy	54	21	23/11/1996	Twickenham, London	Test Match
Argentina	20	18	14/12/1996	Twickenham, London	Test Match

== 1997 ==
Scores and results list England's points tally first.

Opposing Teams	For	Against	Date	Venue	Status
Scotland	41	13	01/02/1997	Twickenham, London	Five Nations
Ireland	46	6	15/02/1997	Lansdowne Road, Dublin	Five Nations
France	20	23	01/03/1997	Twickenham, London	Five Nations
Wales	34	13	15/03/1997	Cardiff Arms Park, Cardiff	Five Nations
Argentina	46	20	31/05/1997	Ferrocarril Stadium, Buenos Aires	First Test
Argentina	13	33	07/06/1997	Ferrocarril Stadium, Buenos Aires	Second Test
Australia	6	25	12/07/1997	Sydney Football Stadium, Sydney	Test Match
Australia	15	15	15/11/1997	Twickenham, London	Test Match
New Zealand	8	25	22/11/1997	Old Trafford, Manchester	First Test
South Africa	11	29	29/11/1997	Twickenham, London	Test Match
New Zealand	26	26	06/12/1997	Twickenham, London	Second Test

== 1998 ==
Scores and results list England's points tally first.

Opposing Teams	For	Against	Date	Venue	Status
France	17	24	07/02/1998	Stade de France, Saint-Denis	Five Nations
Wales	60	26	21/02/1998	Twickenham, London	Five Nations
Scotland	34	20	22/03/1998	Murrayfield, Edinburgh	Five Nations
Ireland	31	17	04/04/1998	Twickenham, London	Five Nations
Australia	0	76	06/06/1998	Lang Park, Brisbane	Test Match
New Zealand	22	64	20/06/1998	Carisbrook, Dunedin	First Test
New Zealand	10	40	27/06/1998	Eden Park, Auckland	Second Test
South Africa	0	18	04/07/1998	Newlands, Cape Town	Test Match
Netherlands	110	0	14/11/1998	McAlpine Stadium, Huddersfield	World Cup qualification
Italy	23	15	22/11/1998	McAlpine Stadium, Huddersfield	World Cup qualification
Australia	11	12	28/11/1998	Twickenham, London	Test Match
South Africa	13	7	05/12/1998	Twickenham, London	Test Match

== 1999 ==
Scores and results list England's points tally first.

Opposing Teams	For	Against	Date	Venue	Status
Scotland	24	21	20/02/1999	Twickenham, London	Five Nations
Ireland	27	15	06/03/1999	Lansdowne Road, Dublin	Five Nations
France	21	10	20/03/1999	Twickenham, London	Five Nations
Wales	31	32	11/04/1999	Wembley Stadium, London	Five Nations
Australia	15	22	26/06/1999	Stadium Australia, Sydney	Test Match
U.S.A.	106	8	21/08/1999	Twickenham, London	Test Match
Canada	36	11	28/08/1999	Twickenham, London	Test Match
Italy	67	7	02/10/1999	Twickenham, London	1999 Rugby World Cup
New Zealand	16	30	09/10/1999	Twickenham, London	1999 Rugby World Cup
Tonga	101	10	15/10/1999	Twickenham, London	1999 Rugby World Cup
Fiji	45	24	20/10/1999	Twickenham, London	1999 Rugby World Cup
South Africa	21	44	24/10/1999	Stade de France, Saint-Denis	1999 Rugby World Cup

== Year Box ==
Preceded by 1980–1989	England Rugby Results; 1990–1999	Succeeded by 2000–2009
