= List of England national rugby union team results 1900–1909 =

This is a list of results that England have played from 1900 to 1909.

== 1900 ==
Scores and results list England's points tally first.

Opposing Teams	For	Against	Date	Venue	Status
Wales	3	13	06/01/1900	Kingsholm, Gloucester	Home Nations Championship
Ireland	15	4	03/02/1900	Athletic Ground, Richmond	Home Nations Championship
Scotland	0	0	10/03/1900	Inverleith, Edinburgh	Home Nations Championship

== 1901 ==
Scores and results list England's points tally first.

Opposing Teams	For	Against	Date	Venue	Status
Wales	0	13	05/01/1901	Cardiff Arms Park, Cardiff	Home Nations Championship
Ireland	6	10	09/02/1901	Lansdowne Road, Dublin	Home Nations Championship
Scotland	3	18	09/03/1901	Rectory Field, Blackheath	Home Nations Championship

== 1902 ==
Scores and results list England's points tally first.

Opposing Teams	For	Against	Date	Venue	Status
Wales	8	9	11/01/1902	Rectory Field, Blackheath	Home Nations Championship
Ireland	6	3	08/02/1902	Welford Road, Leicester	Home Nations Championship
Scotland	6	3	15/03/1902	Inverleith, Edinburgh	Home Nations Championship

== 1903 ==
Scores and results list England's points tally first.

Opposing Teams	For	Against	Date	Venue	Status
Wales	5	21	10/01/1903	St. Helen's, Swansea	Home Nations Championship
Ireland	0	6	14/02/1903	Lansdowne Road, Dublin	Home Nations Championship
Scotland	6	10	21/03/1903	Athletic Ground, Richmond	Home Nations Championship

== 1904 ==
Scores and results list England's points tally first.

Opposing Teams	For	Against	Date	Venue	Status
Wales	14	14	09/01/1904	Welford Road, Leicester	Home Nations Championship
Ireland	19	0	13/02/1904	Rectory Field, Blackheath	Home Nations Championship
Scotland	3	6	19/03/1904	Inverleith, Edinburgh	Home Nations Championship

== 1905 ==
Scores and results list England's points tally first.

Opposing Teams	For	Against	Date	Venue	Status
Wales	0	23	14/01/1905	Cardiff Arms Park, Cardiff	Home Nations Championship
Ireland	3	17	11/02/1905	Mardyke, Cork	Home Nations Championship
Scotland	0	8	18/03/1905	Athletic Ground, Richmond	Home Nations Championship
New Zealand	0	15	02/12/1905	Crystal Palace	Test Match

== 1906 ==
Scores and results list England's points tally first.

Opposing Teams	For	Against	Date	Venue	Status
Wales	3	16	13/01/1906	Athletic Ground, Richmond	Home Nations Championship
Ireland	6	16	10/02/1906	Welford Road, Leicester	Home Nations Championship
Scotland	9	3	17/03/1906	Inverleith, Edinburgh	Home Nations Championship
France	35	8	22/03/1906	Parc des Princes, Paris	Test Match
South Africa	3	3	08/12/1906	Crystal Palace	Test Match

== 1907 ==
Scores and results list England's points tally first.

Opposing Teams	For	Against	Date	Venue	Status
France	41	13	05/01/1907	Athletic Ground, Richmond	Test Match
Wales	0	22	12/01/1907	St. Helen's, Swansea	Home Nations Championship
Ireland	9	17	09/02/1907	Lansdowne Road, Dublin	Home Nations Championship
Scotland	3	8	16/03/1907	Rectory Field, Blackheath	Home Nations Championship

== 1908 ==
Scores and results list England's points tally first.

Opposing Teams	For	Against	Date	Venue	Status
France	19	0	01/01/1908	Stade Colombes, Paris	Test Match
Wales	18	28	18/01/1908	Ashton Gate, Bristol	Home Nations Championship
Ireland	13	3	08/02/1908	Athletic Ground, Richmond	Home Nations Championship
Scotland	10	16	21/03/1908	Inverleith, Edinburgh	Home Nations Championship

== 1909 ==
Scores and results list England's points tally first.

Opposing Teams	For	Against	Date	Venue	Status
Australia	3	9	09/01/1909	Rectory Field, Blackheath	Test Match
Wales	0	8	16/01/1909	Cardiff Arms Park, Cardiff	Home Nations Championship
France	22	0	30/01/1909	Welford Road, Leicester	Test Match
Ireland	11	5	13/02/1909	Lansdowne Road, Dublin	Home Nations Championship
Scotland	8	18	20/03/1909	Athletic Ground, Richmond	Home Nations Championship

== Year Box ==
Preceded by 1890-1899	England Rugby Results; 1900–1909	Succeeded by 1910-1914

== General references ==
- Woolgar, Jason (2004). England : the official R.F.U. history. London: Virgin. ISBN 1-85227-210-4.
- McGowan, Phil; Steele, Richard (2021). England Rugby: 150 Years. Vision Sports Publishing. ISBN 978-1-913412-09-8.
- "England". Rugby Data Bank.
