= List of England national rugby union team results 1980–1989 =

These are the list of results that England have played from 1980 to 1989.

== 1980 ==
Scores and results list England's points tally first.

Opposing Teams	For	Against	Date	Venue	Status
Ireland	24	9	19/01/1980	Twickenham, London	Five Nations
France	17	13	02/02/1980	Parc des Princes, Paris	Five Nations
Wales	9	8	16/02/1980	Twickenham, London	Five Nations
Scotland	30	18	15/03/1980	Murrayfield, Edinburgh	Five Nations

== 1981 ==
Scores and results list England's points tally first.

Opposing Teams	For	Against	Date	Venue	Status
Wales	19	21	17/01/1981	Cardiff Arms Park, Cardiff	Five Nations
Scotland	23	17	21/02/1981	Twickenham, London	Five Nations
Ireland	10	6	07/03/1981	Lansdowne Road, Dublin	Five Nations
France	12	16	21/03/1981	Twickenham, London	Five Nations
Argentina	19	19	30/05/1981	Ferrocarril Stadium, Buenos Aires	First Test
Argentina	12	6	06/06/1981	Ferrocarril Stadium, Buenos Aires	Second Test

== 1982 ==
Scores and results list England's points tally first.

Opposing Teams	For	Against	Date	Venue	Status
Australia	15	11	02/01/1982	Twickenham, London	Test Match
Scotland	9	9	16/01/1982	Murrayfield, Edinburgh	Five Nations
Ireland	15	16	06/02/1982	Twickenham, London	Five Nations
France	25	15	20/02/1982	Parc des Princes, Paris	Five Nations
Wales	17	7	06/03/1982	Twickenham, London	Five Nations

== 1983 ==
Scores and results list England's points tally first.

Opposing Teams	For	Against	Date	Venue	Status
France	15	19	15/01/1983	Twickenham, London	Five Nations
Wales	13	13	05/02/1983	Cardiff Arms Park, Cardiff	Five Nations
Scotland	12	22	05/03/1983	Twickenham, London	Five Nations
Ireland	15	25	19/03/1983	Lansdowne Road, Dublin	Five Nations
New Zealand	15	9	19/11/1983	Twickenham, London	Test Match

== 1984 ==
Scores and results list England's points tally first.

Opposing Teams	For	Against	Date	Venue	Status
Scotland	6	18	04/02/1984	Murrayfield, Edinburgh	Five Nations
Ireland	12	9	18/02/1984	Twickenham, London	Five Nations
France	18	32	03/03/1984	Parc des Princes, Paris	Five Nations
Wales	15	24	17/03/1984	Twickenham, London	Five Nations
South Africa	15	33	02/06/1984	Boet Erasmus Stadium, Port Elizabeth	First Test
South Africa	9	35	19/06/1984	Ellis Park, Johannesburg	Second Test
Australia	3	19	03/11/1984	Twickenham, London	Test Match

== 1985 ==
Scores and results list England's points tally first.

Opposing Teams	For	Against	Date	Venue	Status
Romania	22	15	05/01/1985	Twickenham, London	Test Match
France	9	9	02/02/1985	Twickenham, London	Five Nations
Scotland	10	7	16/03/1985	Twickenham, London	Five Nations
Ireland	10	13	30/03/1985	Lansdowne Road, Dublin	Five Nations
Wales	15	24	20/04/1985	Cardiff Arms Park, Cardiff	Five Nations
New Zealand	13	18	01/06/1985	Lancaster Park, Christchurch	First Test
New Zealand	15	42	08/06/1985	Athletic Park, Wellington	Second Test

== 1986 ==
Scores and results list England's points tally first.

Opposing Teams	For	Against	Date	Venue	Status
Wales	21	18	18/01/1986	Twickenham, London	Five Nations
Scotland	6	33	15/02/1986	Murrayfield, Edinburgh	Five Nations
Ireland	25	20	01/03/1986	Twickenham, London	Five Nations
France	10	29	15/03/1986	Parc des Princes, Paris	Five Nations

== 1987 ==
Scores and results list England's points tally first.

Opposing Teams	For	Against	Date	Venue	Status
Ireland	0	17	07/02/1987	Lansdowne Road, Dublin	Five Nations
France	15	19	21/02/1987	Twickenham, London	Five Nations
Wales	12	19	07/03/1987	Cardiff Arms Park, Cardiff	Five Nations
Scotland	21	12	04/04/1987	Twickenham, London	Five Nations
Australia	6	19	23/05/1987	Concord Oval, Sydney	1987 Rugby World Cup
Japan	60	7	30/05/1987	Concord Oval, Sydney	1987 Rugby World Cup
U.S.A.	34	6	03/06/1987	Concord Oval, Sydney	1987 Rugby World Cup
Wales	3	16	08/06/1987	Ballymore, Brisbane	1987 Rugby World Cup

== 1988 ==
Scores and results list England's points tally first.

Opposing Teams	For	Against	Date	Venue	Status
France	9	10	16/01/1988	Parc des Princes, Paris	Five Nations
Wales	3	11	06/02/1988	Twickenham, London	Five Nations
Scotland	9	6	05/03/1988	Murrayfield, Edinburgh	Five Nations
Ireland	35	3	19/03/1988	Twickenham, London	Five Nations
Ireland	21	10	23/04/1988	Lansdowne Road, Dublin	Millennium Trophy Match
Australia	16	22	29/05/1988	Ballymore, Brisbane	First Test
Australia	8	28	12/06/1988	Concord Oval, Sydney	Second Test
Fiji	25	12	16/06/1988	National Stadium, Suva	Test Match
Australia	28	19	05/11/1988	Twickenham, London	Test Match

== 1989 ==
Scores and results list England's points tally first.

Opposing Teams	For	Against	Date	Venue	Status
Scotland	12	12	04/02/1989	Twickenham, London	Five Nations
Ireland	16	3	18/02/1989	Lansdowne Road, Dublin	Five Nations
France	11	0	04/03/1989	Twickenham, London	Five Nations
Wales	9	12	18/03/1989	Cardiff Arms Park, Cardiff	Five Nations
Romania	58	3	13/05/1989	Dinamo Stadium, Bucharest	Test Match
Fiji	58	23	04/11/1989	Twickenham, London	Test Match

== Year Box ==
Preceded by 1970–1979	England Rugby Results; 1980–1989	Succeeded by 1990–1999
