= Victor Marriott =

England international rugby union player

- Full name: Victor Robert Marriott
- Born: 29 January 1938 (age 88) Battersea, England

Rugby union career
- Position: Flanker / No. 8
International career
| Years | Team | Apps | (Points) |
| 1963–64 | England | 4 | (0) |

Victor Robert Marriott (born 29 January 1938) is an English former international rugby union player.

Marriott, born in Battersea, played his club rugby for Harlequins and was a regular Surrey representative player.

A mobile and speedy back-rower, Marriott made the England squad for their 1963 tour of Australasia and played all three Test matches, debuting against the All Blacks at Eden Park. His other appearances were against the All Blacks at Lancaster Park and in the one-off Test against the Wallabies at the Sydney Sports Ground. He was capped a fourth time the following year when the All Blacks came to Twickenham.

== See also ==
- List of England national rugby union players
