= Brian Wightman (rugby union) =

England international rugby union player

- Full name: Brian John Wightman
- Born: 23 September 1936 Birmingham, England
- Died: 29 November 1999 (aged 63) Auckland, New Zealand
- School: King Edward's School
- Occupation: Sports administrator

Rugby union career
- Position: No. 8
International career
Years	Team	Apps	(Points)
1959–63	England	5	(0)

Brian John Wightman (23 September 1936 – 29 November 1999) was an English international rugby union player from 1959 to 1963 and later sports administrator in Oceania.

== Biography ==
Born in Birmingham, Wightman attended King Edward's School and played his rugby as a number eight, spending much of his career at West Midlands clubs Coventry and Moseley. He was capped by England in three Five Nations matches and gained another two caps on the 1963 tour of Australasia, against the All Blacks and Wallabies.

Wightman, a schoolteacher, moved to Canada in 1964 and worked at the University of British Columbia (UBC), where he coached their rugby XV. An annual rugby fixture between UBC and the University of Victoria is named in his honour.

During the 1970s and 1980s, Wightman held several high level sport administration roles in Oceania, including as vice president of the Oceania National Olympic Committees. He was Chef de Mission for Fiji at the 1984 Olympic Games and served as president of their Olympic Committee. For his contributions to Fijian sport, Wightman was awarded an Olympic Order (Silver).

== See also ==
- List of England national rugby union players
