= Jim Stewart (cricketer) =

Welsh cricketer

Personal information
- Full name: William James Perver Stewart
- Born: 31 August 1934 (age 92); Llanelly, Monmouthshire, Wales
- Batting: Right-handed
- Bowling: Right-arm off-break

Domestic team information
- Years: Team
- 1955 to 1969: Warwickshire
- 1971 to 1972: Northamptonshire

Career statistics
Competition	First-class	List A
Matches	290	29
Runs scored	14,826	413
Batting average	34.08	17.95
100s/50s	25/76	0/3
Top score	182*	59
Balls bowled	18	0
Wickets	2	–
Bowling average	7.50	–
5 wickets in innings	0	–
10 wickets in match	0	–
Best bowling	2/4	–
Catches/stumpings	132/–	5/–
- Source: Cricinfo

William James Perver Stewart (born 31 August 1934) is a former English first-class cricketer. He played for Warwickshire from 1955 to 1969, and for Northamptonshire in 1971 and 1972.

== Life and career ==
Jim Stewart was born in Wales and his family moved to Warwickshire when he was a boy. He made his first-class debut for Warwickshire in 1955 and played frequently without establishing his place until 1959, when he scored 1,799 runs at an average of 40.88 with five centuries. He hit four of those centuries in five innings. Against Lancashire he set a world first-class record by hitting 17 sixes in the match. A tall, powerfully built opening batsman, he was an especially strong driver.

Stewart had another successful season in 1960, with 1,764 runs at an average of 42.00. He was selected to tour New Zealand in 1960–61 with a team of young English players, making 354 runs in the first-class matches at 39.33 and playing in all three unofficial Tests against New Zealand. His most successful season was 1962, when he scored 2,318 runs, including 2,100 runs at 42.85 in the County Championship. His seven centuries that year included his highest score, when he made 182 not out and 79 not out in the victory over Leicestershire.

A broken big toe on his left foot, which led to the toe's amputation, hampered Stewart's progress for the next few years, and he was also held back by an operation for arthritis in his right hand. Nevertheless, he still exceeded 1,000 runs in 1965 and 1968. After leaving Warwickshire at the end of the 1969 season he played a few matches for Northamptonshire in the John Player League in 1971 and 1972, but with little success.

Stewart was also a rugby union player who played at full back in three of the Warwickshire teams that won the rugby union County Championship.

Stewart and his wife Frances were married in Coventry in November 1960.
