= History of rugby union matches between England and Italy =

The national rugby union teams of England and Italy have been playing each other in Test rugby since 1991, and by March 2026, they had met in 33 test matches. Of these, 32 have been won by England and 1 won by Italy.

Their first meeting was on 8 October 1991 in the 1991 Rugby World Cup; England won 36–6. England had played Italy three times in Rugby World Cups, once in a Rugby World Cup qualifier at Huddersfield, and once in an Autumn International, prior to Italy’s joining the Six Nations Championship. Italy's inclusion into the Six Nations Championship in 2000 has ensured annual meetings between the two sides.

England have typically dominated the head-to-head between the sides, despite some spirited displays by Italy. In 2026, Italy registered their first win in the fixture. The match ended in a 23–18 victory for Italy in Stadio Olimpico, Rome during the fourth round of the 2026 Six Nations Championship.

== Summary ==
=== Overall ===
Details	Played	Won by England	Won by Italy	Drawn	England points	Italy points
In England	18	18	0	0	768	228
In Italy	14	13	1	0	499	174
Neutral venue	1	1	0	0	27	20
Overall	33	32	1	0	1,289	427

=== Records ===
Note: Date shown in brackets indicates when the record was last set.

Record	England	Italy
Longest winning streak	32 (8 Oct 1991-7 March 2026)	1 (7 March 2026-Present)
Largest points for
Home	80 (17 February 2001)	24 (3 February 2024)
Away	59 (18 March 2000)	24 (9 March 2025)
Largest winning margin
Home	60 (2 October 1999)	5 (7 March 2026)
Away	47 (18 March 2000)	—N/a

== Results ==
No.	Date	Venue	Score	Winner	Competition
1	8 October 1991	Twickenham Stadium, London	36–6	England	1991 Rugby World Cup
2	31 May 1995	Kings Park Stadium, Durban (South Africa)	27–20	England	1995 Rugby World Cup
3	23 November 1996	Twickenham Stadium, London	54–21	England	1996 Italy tour of Great Britain
4	22 November 1998	Galpharm Stadium, Huddersfield	23–15	England	1999 Rugby World Cup qualification
5	2 October 1999	Twickenham Stadium, London	67–7	England	1999 Rugby World Cup
6	18 March 2000	Stadio Flaminio, Rome	12–59	England	2000 Six Nations Championship
7	17 February 2001	Twickenham Stadium, London	80–23	England	2001 Six Nations Championship
8	7 April 2002	Stadio Flaminio, Rome	9–45	England	2002 Six Nations Championship
9	9 March 2003	Twickenham Stadium, London	40–5	England	2003 Six Nations Championship
10	15 February 2004	Stadio Flaminio, Rome	9–50	England	2004 Six Nations Championship
11	12 March 2005	Twickenham Stadium, London	39–7	England	2005 Six Nations Championship
12	11 February 2006	Stadio Flaminio, Rome	16–31	England	2006 Six Nations Championship
13	10 February 2007	Twickenham Stadium, London	20–7	England	2007 Six Nations Championship
14	10 February 2008	Stadio Flaminio, Rome	19–23	England	2008 Six Nations Championship
15	7 February 2009	Twickenham Stadium, London	36–11	England	2009 Six Nations Championship
16	14 February 2010	Stadio Flaminio, Rome	12–17	England	2010 Six Nations Championship
17	12 February 2011	Twickenham Stadium, London	59–13	England	2011 Six Nations Championship
18	11 February 2012	Stadio Olimpico, Rome	15–19	England	2012 Six Nations Championship
19	10 March 2013	Twickenham Stadium, London	18–11	England	2013 Six Nations Championship
20	15 March 2014	Stadio Olimpico, Rome	11–52	England	2014 Six Nations Championship
21	14 February 2015	Twickenham Stadium, London	47–17	England	2015 Six Nations Championship
22	14 February 2016	Stadio Olimpico, Rome	9–40	England	2016 Six Nations Championship
23	26 February 2017	Twickenham Stadium, London	36–15	England	2017 Six Nations Championship
24	4 February 2018	Stadio Olimpico, Rome	15–46	England	2018 Six Nations Championship
25	9 March 2019	Twickenham Stadium, London	57–14	England	2019 Six Nations Championship
26	6 September 2019	St James' Park, Newcastle upon Tyne	37–0	England	2019 Rugby World Cup warm-up match
27	31 October 2020	Stadio Olimpico, Rome	5–34	England	2020 Six Nations Championship
28	13 February 2021	Twickenham Stadium, London	41–18	England	2021 Six Nations Championship
29	13 February 2022	Stadio Olimpico, Rome	0–33	England	2022 Six Nations Championship
30	12 February 2023	Twickenham Stadium, London	31–14	England	2023 Six Nations Championship
31	3 February 2024	Stadio Olimpico, Rome	24–27	England	2024 Six Nations Championship
32	9 March 2025	Twickenham Stadium, London	47–24	England	2025 Six Nations Championship
33	7 March 2026	Stadio Olimpico, Rome	23–18	Italy	2026 Six Nations Championship

== Non-test results ==
Below is a list of matches that Italy has awarded test match status by virtue of awarding caps, but England did not. An England XV played Italy in 1990, in Rovigo, but this match was not considered a 'full' international by England, so no full caps were awarded.

No.	Date	Venue	Score	Winner	Competition	Attendance	Ref	Notes
1	10 May 1986	Stadio Olimpico, Rome	15–15	draw	England XV tour			(Note: Not classed as a full international by England who played as an England XV)
2	1 May 1990	Rovigo	15–33	win	England XV tour			(Note: Not classed as a full international by England who played as an England XV)
