= 1964 Five Nations Championship =

Rugby union competition

- Date: 4 January - 11 April 1964
- Countries: England; Ireland; France; Scotland; Wales

Tournament statistics
- Champions: Scotland and Wales
- Matches played: 10

The 1964 Five Nations Championship was the thirty-fifth series of the rugby union Five Nations Championship. Including the previous incarnations as the Home Nations and Five Nations, this was the seventieth series of the northern hemisphere rugby union championship. 10 matches were played between 4 January and 11 April. It was contested by England, France, Ireland, Scotland and Wales.

== Participants ==
The teams involved were:

| Nation | Venue | City | Head coach | Captain |
|---|---|---|---|---|
| England | Twickenham | London | none | John Willcox/Ron Jacobs |
| France | Stade Olympique Yves-du-Manoir | Colombes | Jean Prat | Jean Fabre/Michel Crauste |
| Ireland | Lansdowne Road | Dublin | none | Bill Mulcahy |
| Scotland | Murrayfield | Edinburgh | none | Brian Neill |
| Wales | National Stadium | Cardiff | none | Clive Rowlands |

== Table ==
| Pos | Team | Pld | W | D | L | PF | PA | PD | Pts |
|---|---|---|---|---|---|---|---|---|---|
| 1 | Wales | 4 | 2 | 2 | 0 | 43 | 26 | +17 | 6 |
| 1 | Scotland | 4 | 3 | 0 | 1 | 34 | 20 | +14 | 6 |
| 3 | France | 4 | 1 | 1 | 2 | 41 | 33 | +8 | 3 |
| 3 | England | 4 | 1 | 1 | 2 | 23 | 42 | −19 | 3 |
| 5 | Ireland | 4 | 1 | 0 | 3 | 33 | 53 | −20 | 2 |

== Results ==
1964-01-04

| Scotland | 10–0 | France |

Edinburgh

1964-01-18

| England | 6–6 | Wales |

London

1964-02-01

| Wales | 11–3 | Scotland |

Cardiff

1964-02-08

| England | 5–18 | Ireland |

London

1964-02-22

| France | 3–6 | England |

Paris

1964-02-22

| Ireland | 3–6 | Scotland |

Dublin

1964-03-07

| Ireland | 6–15 | Wales |

Dublin

1964-03-21

| Wales | 11–11 | France |

Cardiff

1964-03-21

| Scotland | 15–6 | England |

Edinburgh

1964-04-11

| France | 27–6 | Ireland |

Paris
