= Quilter Cup =

Rugby union trophy

- Sport: Rugby union
- Founded: 2016
- No. of teams: 3
- Most recent champion: Barbarians (2022)
- Most titles: England (3)

The Quilter Cup (formerly the Old Mutual Wealth Cup) is a rugby union trophy awarded to the winner of an annual fixture played in May between England and another national team or the Barbarians. It is currently held by the Barbarians since their victory in 2022.

The fixture was launched on 2 December 2015 when the RFU announced a four-year partnership with Old Mutual Wealth.

The first Old Mutual Wealth Cup match was won by England, who beat Wales 27–13 at Twickenham Stadium on 29 May 2016.

From 2018 the competition was renamed to reflect the new name of the sponsor Quilter plc.

== Results ==
No.	Date	Venue	Score	Opposition	Winner	Match report
1	29 May 2016	Twickenham Stadium, London	27–13	Wales	England	
2	28 May 2017	Twickenham Stadium, London	28–14	Barbarians	England	
3	27 May 2018	Twickenham Stadium, London	45–63	Barbarians	Barbarians	
4	2 June 2019	Twickenham Stadium, London	51–43	Barbarians	England	
5	25 October 2020 (Note: Initially postponed from 21 June to 25 October due to the COVID-19 pandemic the match was later cancelled due to a breach of COVID protocols.)	Twickenham Stadium, London	Cancelled	Barbarians		
6	19 June 2022	Twickenham Stadium, London	21–52	Barbarians	Barbarians	
