= Tom Pargetter =

England international rugby union player

- Full name: Thomas Alfred Pargetter
- Born: 21 July 1932 (age 94) Stratford-upon-Avon, England
- Height: 6 ft 4 in (1.93 m)
- School: King Edward VI School, Stratford-upon-Avon

Rugby union career
- Position: Lock
International career
Years	Team	Apps	(Points)
1962–63	England	3	(0)

Thomas Alfred Pargetter (born 21 July 1932) is an English former international rugby union player.

Pargetter was born and raised in Stratford-upon-Avon, receiving his education at King Edward VI School.

A 6 ft 4 in forward, Pargetter played his rugby for Stratford-upon-Avon RFC, Moseley, Coventry and Warwickshire.

Pargetter, a baker by profession, debuted for England against Scotland at Murrayfield in the 1962 Five Nations, having only just returned to the sport, after he had retired the previous year due to work commitments. In 1963, Pargetter made another Five Nations appearance, a win over France at Twickenham, then won a place on England's tour of Australasia and gained a third cap in the Test against the All Blacks at Eden Park.

== See also ==
- List of England national rugby union players
