= Stan Purdy =

England international rugby union player

- Full name: Stanley John Purdy
- Born: 6 February 1936 (age 90) Rugby, England
- School: Lawrence Sheriff School
- University: University of Nottingham

Rugby union career
- Position: Flanker
International career
| Years | Team | Apps | (Points) |
| 1962 | England | 1 | (0) |

Stanley John Purdy (born 6 February 1936) is an English former international rugby union player.

Born in Rugby, Warwickshire, Purdy was educated at Warwickshire Grammar School and Lawrence Sheriff School, where he captained the first XV. He undertook further studies at the University of Nottingham.

Purdy, a goal-kicking back-rower, was a regular in the Warwickshire representative sides of the 1950s and 1960s, winning seven country championship titles. In 1962, Purdy won an England cap as a blind-side wing-forward against Scotland at Murrayfield, which finished in a 3–3 draw. He competed with hometown club the Rugby Lions until 1964, then switched to Fylde for two and a half seasons, before returning to Rugby in 1967.

== See also ==
- List of England national rugby union players
