= 1961 Five Nations Championship =

Rugby tournament

- Date: 7 January - 15 April 1961
- Countries: England; Ireland; France; Scotland; Wales

Tournament statistics
- Champions: France (2nd title)
- Matches played: 10

The 1961 Five Nations Championship was the thirty-second series of the rugby union Five Nations Championship. Including the previous incarnations as the Home Nations and Five Nations, this was the sixty-seventh series of the northern hemisphere rugby union championship. Ten matches were played between 7 January and 15 April. It was contested by England, France, Ireland, Scotland and Wales.

== Participants ==
The teams involved were:

Nation	Venue	City	Captain
England	Twickenham	London	Dickie Jeeps
France	Stade Olympique Yves-du-Manoir	Colombes	François Moncla
Ireland	Lansdowne Road	Dublin	Ronnie Dawson
Scotland	Murrayfield	Edinburgh	Gordon Waddell/Arthur Smith
Wales	National Stadium	Cardiff	Terry Davies/Onllwyn Brace/Lloyd Williams

== Table ==
Pos	Team	Pld	W	D	L	PF	PA	PD	Pts
1	France	4	3	1	0	39	14	+25	7
2	Wales	4	2	0	2	21	14	+7	4
2	Scotland	4	2	0	2	19	25	−6	4
4	England	4	1	1	2	22	22	0	3
5	Ireland	4	1	0	3	22	48	−26	2

== Results ==
1961-01-07

France	11–0	Scotland

Paris

1961-01-21

Wales	6–3	England

Cardiff

1961-02-11

Ireland	11–8	England

Dublin

1961-02-11

Scotland	3–0	Wales

Edinburgh

1961-02-25

England	5–5	France

London

1961-02-25

Scotland	16–8	Ireland

Edinburgh

1961-03-11

Wales	9–0	Ireland

Cardiff

1961-03-18

England	6–0	Scotland

London

1961-03-25

France	8–6	Wales

Paris

1961-04-15

Ireland	3–15	France

Dublin
