= 1988 France rugby union tour of South America =

- Date: 4–27 June 1988
Summary
P	W	D	L
Total
8	6	1	1
Test match
3	2	0	1
Opponent
P	W	D	L
Argentina
2	1	0	1
Paraguay
1	1	0	0

The 1988 France rugby union tour of South America was a series of eight matches played by the France national rugby union team in Argentina and Paraguay in June 1988. The French team won six matches, drew one and lost one. The two-match series against the Argentina national rugby union team was drawn, France winning the first game and Argentina the second, in front of a crowd of 50,000 spectators.

== Match summary ==
(Test match)

Date	Rival	Res.	Venue	City
4 June	San Isidro Club	29–16	Vélez Sarsfield	Buenos Aires
7 June	Tucumán	18–18	Atlético Tucumán	S.M. Tucumán
11 June	Buenos Aires	82–0	Vélez Sarsfield	Buenos Aires
14 June	Provincias Argentinas	36–19	Guaraní A. Franco	Posadas
18 June	Argentina	18–15	Vélez Sarsfield	Buenos Aires
21 June	Córdoba	42–9	Chateau Carreras	Córdoba
25 June	Argentina	6–18	Vélez Sarsfield	Buenos Aires
27 June	Paraguay	106–12	La Olla	Asunción

== Match details ==
Legend

ALU= Alumni, BCR= Buenos Aires CRC, BN= Banco Nación, CAR=Atlético Rosario, CASI=C.A. San Isidro, CP=Pucará, CUBA=Universitario BA, CUY=Unión de Rugby de Cuyo, HC=Hindú, IRFU=Irish Rugby Football Union, JCR=Jockey Club Rosario, LP= La Plata RC, ORC=Olivos, SIC=San Isidro Club, SL=San Luis, SM=Club San Martín, UAR=Argentine Rugby Union, UCR= Unión Cordobesa de Rugby, URR= Unión de Rugby de Rosario, URT=Unión de Rugby de Tucumán

4 June 1988

San Isidro Club	16–29	France
Try: Chevalier Boutell, Rarnallo; Con: Madero		Pen: Madero 2

Vélez Sarsfield, Buenos Aires
Referee: Efraim Sklar (Argentina)

San Isidro Club: C.Pirán; P.Chevalier Boutell, D.Cuesta Silva, M.Loffreda (capt.), A.Ramallo; R.Madero, Alfredo Soares Gache; F.Conti, Ignacio Cirio, Ricardo de Vedia; G.Gassó, R.Petti; D.Cash, Juan José Angelillo, Luis.Lonardi.
France: S.Blanco; D.Camberabero, M.Andrieu, D.Charvet, P.Lagisquet; F.Mesnel, P.Berbizier (capt.); M.Cécillon, L.Rodríguez, E.Champ; J.Condom, A.Lorieux; P.Ondarts, P.Marocco, L.Armary.

7 June 1988

Tucumán	18–18	France
Pen: Mesón 6		Try: Deslandes; Con: Berot; Pen: Berot 4

Atlético Tucumán, S.M. Tucumán
Referee: Alberto Freire (Mendoza)

Tucumán: P.Imbert; G.Terán, J.Gianotti, S.Mesón, J.Soler; R.Sauze, P.Merlo; G.Palau, M.Picci (capt.), P.Garretón; P.Buabse, O.Fascioli; J.Coria, R.Le Fort, R.Horta (75' R.Prado).
France: J.B.Lafond; B.Lacombe, D.Charvet, P.Bérot, D.Camberabero; J.Trille, M.Hondagne (capt.); J.Gratton, C.Deslandes, A.Carminati; D.Erbani, P. Béraud; P.Ondarts, P.Marocco, JP Garuet-Lempirou

11 June 1988

Buenos Aires	0–82	France
		Try: Blanco 4, Lagisquet 5 Sella 3, Cecillon 2 Dintrans, Mesnel; Con: Berot 9

Vélez Sarsfield, Buenos Aires
Referee: José L. Rolandi (Argentina)

Buenos Aires: G.Angaut (LP); C.Wagner (HC), M.E.licagaray (CUBA), G.Maschwitz (CUBA), P.Lanza (CUBA); S.Salvat (ALU), A.Soares Gache (SIC), (capt.); F.Conti (SIC), J.Delguy (CP), J.Uriarte (CUBA); G.Travaglini (CASI), D.Silva (ORC); M.Urbano (BCR), A.Courreges (CASI), D.González (San Luis).
France: S.Blanco; P.Lagisquet, P.Sella, M.Andrieu, P.Bérot; F.Mesnel, P.Berbizier (capt.); M.Cécillon, L.Rodriguez (58' D.Erbani), E.Champ; J.Condom, A.Lorieux; L.Armary, P. Dintrans, JP Garuet-Lempirou (34'P.Ondarts)

14 June 1988

Provincias Argentinas	19–36	France
Try: Terán; Pen: Mesón 5		Try: Carminatti 2, Andrieu 2 Lafond, Marocco; Grratton; Con: Berot 4.

Guaraní Antonio Franco, Misiones
Referee: Miguel Angel Peyrone (URR).

Provincias Argentinas: G.Del Castillo (URR); J.Soler (URT), S.Mesón (URT), P.Garzón (UCR), (G.Terán (URT); G.Filizzola (CUY), P.Merlo (URT), (capt.); G.Suárez Lago (CUY), G.Maldonado (UCR), D.Tobal (UCR); O.Fascioli (URT), C.Montenegro (UCR); J.Coria (URT), R.Le Fort (URT), A.Centeno (UCR).
Francia : J-B Lafond (20' M.Andrieu); D.Camberabero, D.Charvet, F.Vélo, P.Bérot; J.Trille, M.Hondagne; P.Athapignet, J.Graton; P.Beraud, D.Erbani; P.Ondarts, D.Dubroca (capt.), P.Marocco.

18 June 1988

Argentina	15–18	France
Try: Angelillo; Con: Baetti; Pen: Baetti 2 Drop: Turnes		Try: Dintrans; Con: Berot; Pen: Berot 4

Vélez Sarsfield, Buenos Aires
Referee: Owen Doyle (Ireland)

Argentina:: A.Scolni (ALU); G.Terán (URT), D.Cuesta Silva (SIC), M.Loffreda (SIC), C.Mendy (LT); F.Turnes (BN), D.Baetti (CAR); P.Garretón (URT), G.Milano (JCR), J.Allen (CASI), (capt.); A.Iachetti (HC), E.Branca (CASI); D.Cash (SIC), J.J.Angelillo (SIC) (D.González - San Luis), S.Dengra SM
France: S.Blanco; P.Bérot, P.Sella, M. Andrieu, P.Lagisquet; F.Mesnel, P.Berbizier (capt.); E.Champ, L.Rodríguez, A.Carminati.; J.Condom, A.Lorieux; JP Garuet-Lempirou, P.Din-trans, P.Ondarts.

21 June 1988

Córdoba	9–42	France
Try: Capelli; Con: Domínguez; Pen: Domínguez		Try: Camberabero 3, Lacombe 2 Lagisquet 2 Con: Camberabero 3, Trille; Pen: Camberabero 2

Chateau Carreras, Córdoba
Referee: Roberto Magnani (Argentina)

Córdoba: J.Tomalino; L.Muzi, P.Garzón, J.Caminotti (capt.) (70' E.Rodríguez), R.Capelli; D.Domínguez R.López Aragón; D.Tobal, G.Maldonado, G.Ruiz Montes de Oca; C.Montenegro, G.Bravo, A.Centeno, C.Hernández (65' G.Bernardi), J.Gigena.
France: J.Trille; B.Lacombe, F.Vélo, D.Charvet, P.Lagisquet; D.Camberabero, M.Cécillon, C.Deslandes (P.Arthapignet), J.Gratton; P.Beraud, D.Erbani; P.Marocco, D.Dubroca (capt.),L.Armary.

25 June 1988

Argentina	18–6	France
Pen: Baetti 6		Pen: Berot 2

Vélez Sarsfield, Buenos Aires
Referee: Owen Doyle (Ireland)

Argentina: A.Scolni (ALU); D.Cuesta Silva (SIC), M.Loffreda (SIC), F.Turnes (BN), C.Mendy (LT); R.Madero (S.I.C); D.Baetti (CAR); J.Allen (CASI) (capt.).G.Milano (JCR), P.Garretón (URT); A.Iachetti (HC), E.Branca (CASI); D.Cash (SIC), A.Courreges (CASI), S.Dengra SM Coach: R. O'Reilly
France: S. Blanco; P. Bérot, P. Sella, M. Andrieu, P. Lagisquet; F. Mesnel, P. Berbizier (70' M.Hondagne) (capt.); A.Carminati, L.Rodriguez, M.Cécillon; J.Condom, A. Lorieux (red card) ; JP Garuet-Lempirou, P. Dintrans, P. Ondarts Coach:J. Fouroux

27 June 1988

Paraguay	12–106	France
Try: Cabrera; Con: Amarilla; Pen: Baez 2		Try: Lagisquet 6, Charvet 5 Sella 4, Champ; Eerot, Trille, Velo; Con: Velo 9, Trille 4, Berot 2

La Olla, Asunción
Referee: Carlos Sutton (Argentina)

== Gallery ==
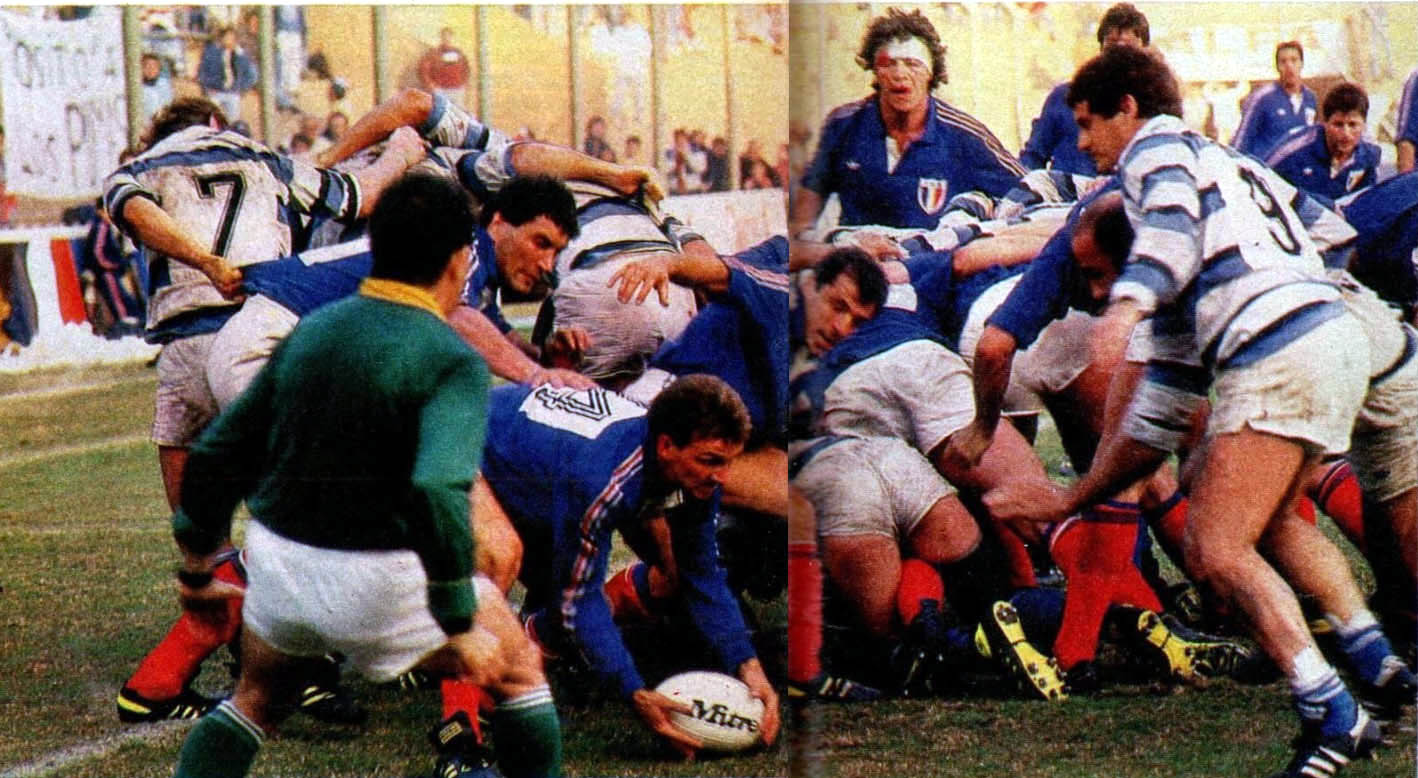
v San Isidro Club

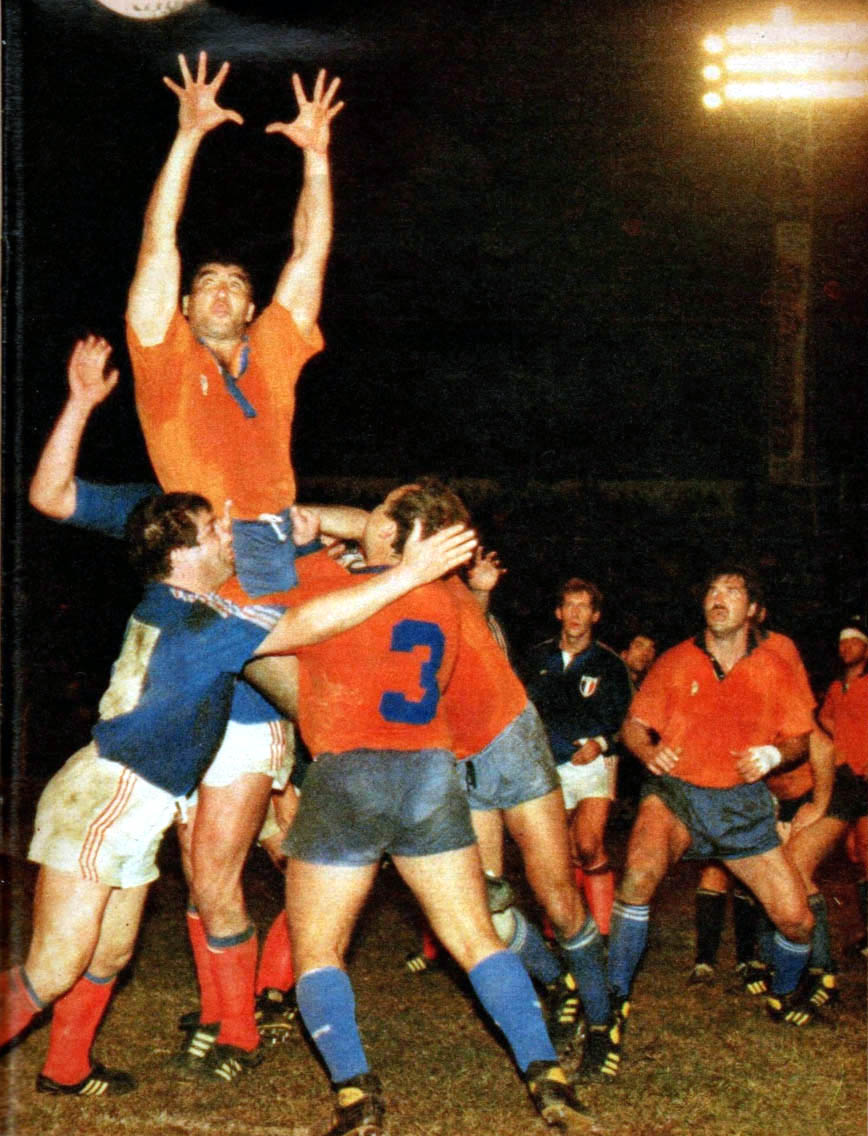
v Tucumán

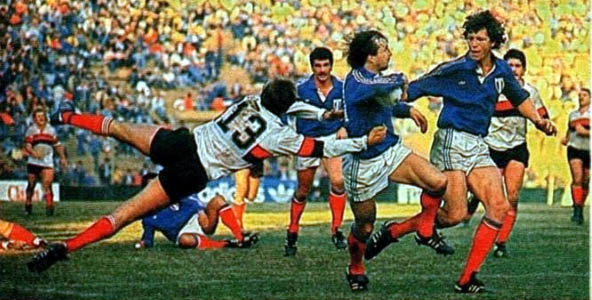
v Buenos Aires

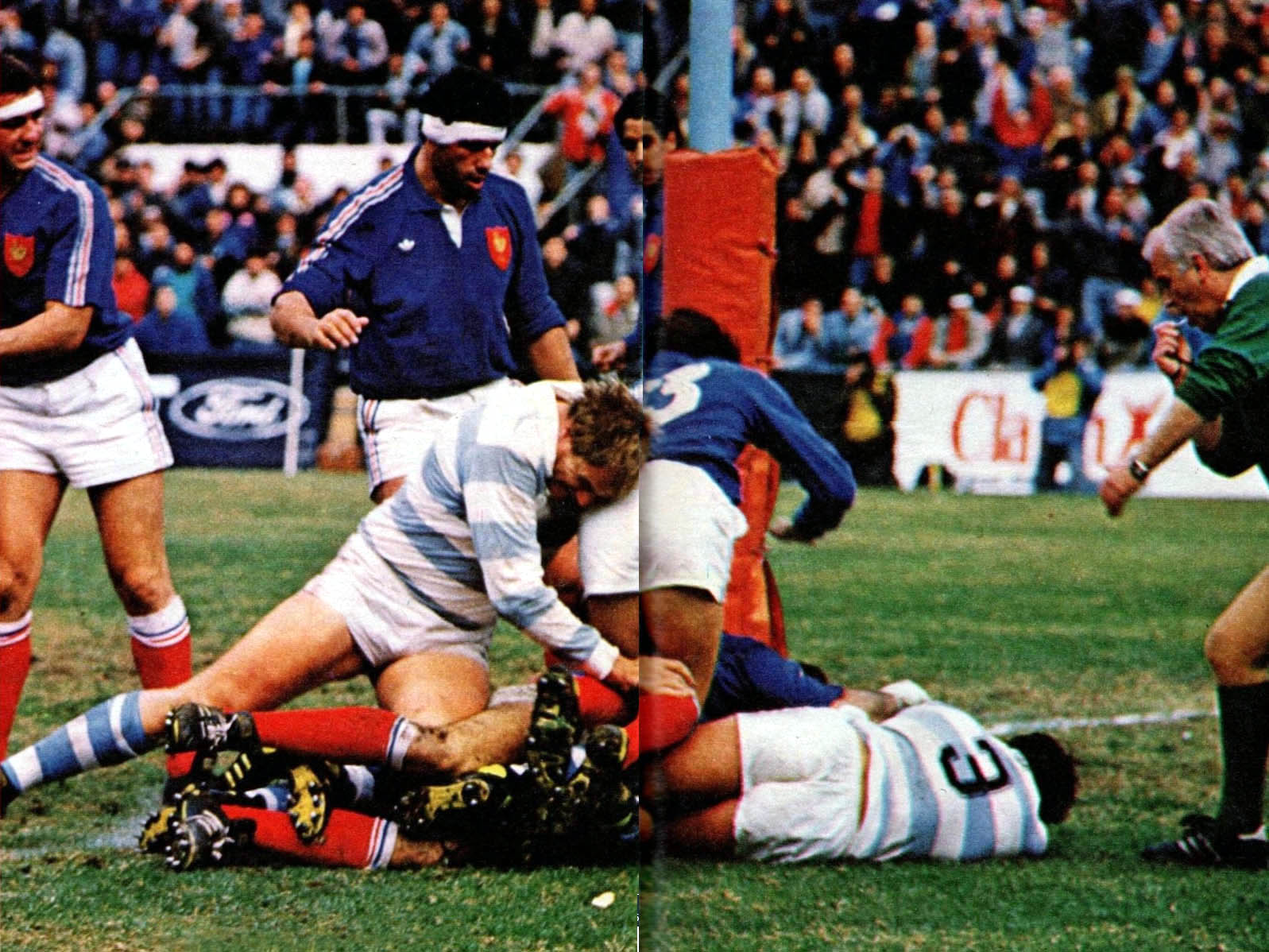
v Argentina (1st test)

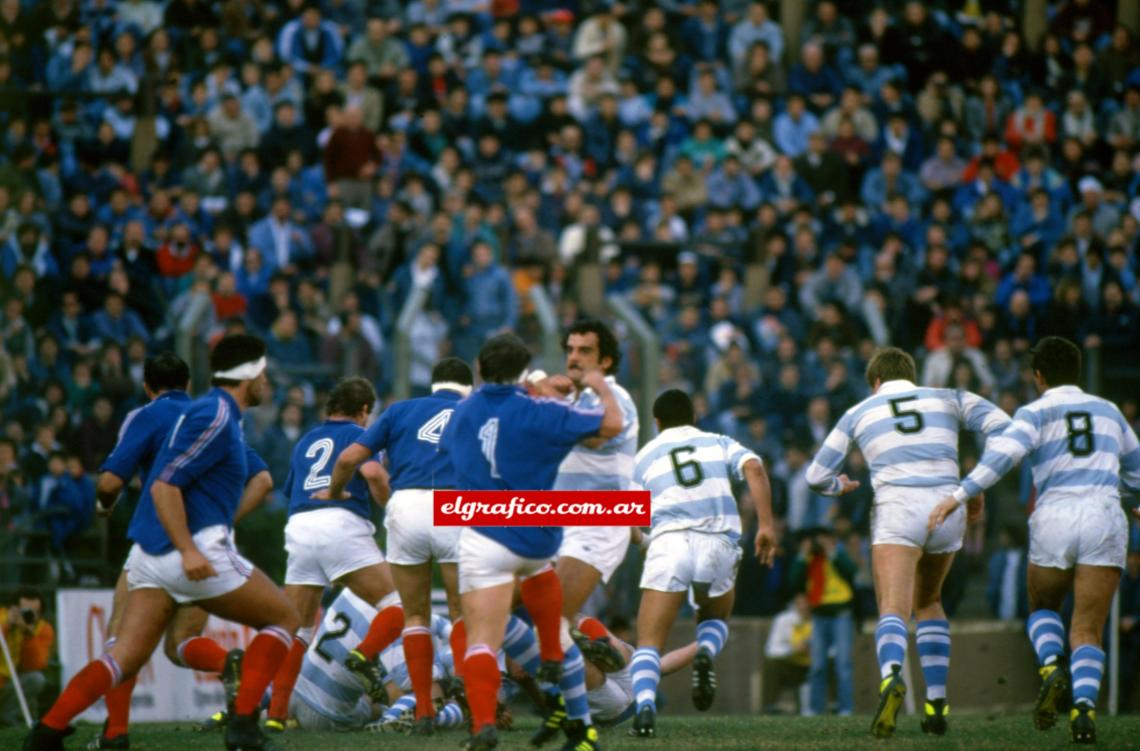
v Argentina (2nd test)

== Bibliography ==
- Stephen Jones, ed. (1989). Rothmans Rugby Union Yearbook 1989-90. Queen Anne Press. ISBN 0-3561-7862-5.
