= 1989 Five Nations Championship squads =

Rugby union competition squads

== England ==
Head coach: Geoff Cooke

1. Paul Ackford
2. Rob Andrew
3. Mark Bailey
4. Will Carling (c.)
5. Wade Dooley
6. David Egerton
7. Jerry Guscott
8. Simon Halliday
9. Richard Hill
10. Simon Hodgkinson
11. Brian Moore
12. Jeff Probyn
13. Paul Rendall
14. Mickey Skinner
15. Mike Teague
16. Rory Underwood
17. Peter Winterbottom

== France ==
Head coach: Jacques Fouroux

1. Marc Andrieu
2. Louis Armary
3. Pierre Berbizier (c.)
4. Philippe Bérot
5. Serge Blanco
6. Gilles Bourguignon
7. Didier Camberabero
8. Alain Carminati
9. Marc Cécillon
10. Éric Champ
11. Denis Charvet
12. Jean Condom
13. Thierry Devergie
14. Philippe Dintrans
15. Dominique Erbani
16. Jean-Pierre Garuet-Lempirou
17. Jean-Baptiste Lafond
18. Patrice Lagisquet
19. Philippe Marocco
20. Franck Mesnel
21. Pascal Ondarts
22. Claude Portolan
23. Laurent Rodriguez
24. Olivier Roumat
25. Philippe Sella

== Ireland ==
Head coach: Jim Davidson

1. Fergus Aherne
2. Willie Anderson
3. Tom Clancy
4. Keith Crossan
5. Phil Danaher
6. Paul Dean
7. Fergus Dunlea
8. Paul Haycock
9. David Irwin
10. Michael Kiernan
11. Donal Lenihan
12. Noel Mannion
13. Phillip Matthews (c.)
14. Denis McBride
15. James Joseph McCoy
16. Brendan Mullin
17. Pat O'Hara
18. John Sexton
19. Steve Smith
20. Brian Spillane

== Scotland ==
Head coach: Jim Telfer

1. Gary Armstrong
2. Paul Burnell
3. Finlay Calder (c.)
4. Craig Chalmers
5. Damian Cronin
6. Peter Dods
7. Matt Duncan
8. Chris Gray
9. Scott Hastings
10. John Jeffrey
11. Sean Lineen
12. Iain Milne
13. Kenny Milne
14. Keith Robertson
15. David Sole
16. Iwan Tukalo
17. Derek White

== Wales ==
Head coach: John Ryan

1. Bleddyn Bowen
2. David Bryant
3. Carwyn Davies
4. Nigel Davies
5. Phil Davies
6. Laurance Delaney
7. John Devereux
8. David Evans
9. Ieuan Evans
10. Jonathan Griffiths
11. Mike Griffiths
12. Mike Hall
13. Gary Jones
14. Mark Jones
15. Robert Jones
16. Kevin Moseley
17. Bob Norster
18. Rowland Phillips
19. Paul Turner
20. Paul Thorburn (c.)
21. Ian Watkins
22. Hugh Williams-Jones
23. Dai Young
