= 1988 Five Nations Championship squads =

Rugby union competition squads

== England ==
Head coach: Geoff Cooke

1. Rob Andrew
2. Will Carling
3. Les Cusworth
4. Wade Dooley
5. Simon Halliday
6. Richard Harding
7. Mike Harrison (c) *
8. Nigel Melville (c) *
9. Brian Moore
10. John Orwin
11. Chris Oti
12. Jeff Probyn
13. Gary Rees
14. Paul Rendall
15. Dean Richards
16. Kevin Simms
17. Mickey Skinner
18. Rory Underwood
19. Jon Webb
20. Peter Winterbottom
- captain in the first two games
- captain in the last two games

== France ==
Head coach: Jacques Fouroux

1. Marc Andrieu
2. Louis Armary
3. Pierre Berbizier
4. Philippe Bérot
5. Serge Blanco
6. Éric Bonneval
7. Didier Camberabero
8. Alain Carminati
9. Marc Cécillon
10. Éric Champ
11. Jean Condom
12. Daniel Dubroca (c)
13. Dominique Erbani
14. Jean-Pierre Garuet-Lempirou
15. Jean-Baptiste Lafond
16. Patrice Lagisquet
17. Jean-Patrick Lescarboura
18. Alain Lorieux
19. Franck Mesnel
20. Pascal Ondarts
21. Jean-Charles Orso
22. Laurent Rodriguez
23. Philippe Sella
24. Jean-Paul Trille

== Ireland ==
Head coach: Jim Davidson

1. Willie Anderson
2. Michael Bradley
3. Tom Clancy
4. Keith Crossan
5. Phil Danaher
6. Paul Dean
7. Des Fitzgerald
8. John Fitzgerald
9. Michael Gibson
10. Michael Kiernan
11. Terry Kingston
12. Donal Lenihan (c)
13. Hugo MacNeill
14. Phillip Matthews
15. Denis McBride
16. Mick Moylett
17. Brendan Mullin
18. Trevor Ringland
19. William Sexton
20. Don Whittle

== Scotland ==
Head coach: Jim Telfer

1. Roger Baird
2. Finlay Calder
3. Gary Callander (c)
4. Alister Campbell
5. Richard Cramb
6. Damian Cronin
7. Matt Duncan
8. Gavin Hastings
9. Scott Hastings
10. John Jeffrey
11. Andrew Ker
12. Roy Laidlaw
13. Iain Paxton
14. Keith Robertson
15. Norrie Rowan
16. David Sole
17. Alan Tait
18. Iwan Tukalo
19. Derek Turnbull
20. Derek White

== Wales ==
Head coach: Tony Gray

1. Bleddyn Bowen (c)
2. Anthony Buchanan
3. Tony Clement
4. Richie Collins
5. Jonathan Davies
6. Ieuan Evans
7. Adrian Hadley
8. Robert Jones
9. Staff Jones
10. Phil May
11. Paul Moriarty
12. Bob Norster
13. Kevin Phillips
14. Rowland Phillips
15. Jeremy Pugh
16. Mark Ring
17. Paul Thorburn
18. Ian Watkins
19. Glen Webbe
