= 1987 Five Nations Championship squads =

Rugby union competition squads

== England ==
Head coach: Martin Green

1. Rob Andrew
2. Steve Bainbridge
3. Stuart Barnes
4. Gareth Chilcott
5. David Cusani
6. Graham Dawe
7. Wade Dooley
8. Jon Hall
9. Simon Halliday
10. Richard Harding
11. Mike Harrison (c.)*
12. Richard Hill (c.)
13. Gary Pearce
14. Nigel Redman
15. Paul Rendall
16. Dean Richards
17. Marcus Rose
18. Jamie Salmon
19. Kevin Simms
20. Paul Simpson
21. Rory Underwood
22. Peter Williams
23. Peter Winterbottom
- captain in the last game

== France ==
Head coach: Jacques Fouroux

1. Pierre Berbizier
2. Philippe Bérot
3. Serge Blanco
4. Éric Bonneval
5. Jean Condom
6. Éric Champ
7. Denis Charvet
8. Daniel Dubroca (c.)
9. Dominique Erbani
10. Jean-Pierre Garuet-Lempirou
11. Francis Haget
12. Jean-Baptiste Lafond
13. Alain Lorieux
14. Franck Mesnel
15. Pascal Ondarts
16. Laurent Rodriguez
17. Philippe Sella

== Ireland ==
Head coach: Mick Doyle

1. Willie Anderson
2. Michael Bradley
3. Nigel Carr
4. Keith Crossan
5. Paul Dean
6. Des Fitzgerald
7. Jim Glennon
8. Harry Harbison
9. Michael Kiernan
10. Donal Lenihan (c.)
11. Hugo MacNeill
12. Phillip Matthews
13. Brendan Mullin
14. Phil Orr
15. Trevor Ringland
16. Brian Spillane

== Scotland ==
Head coach: Jim Telfer

1. Roger Baird
2. John Beattie
3. Finlay Calder
4. Colin Deans (c.)
5. Matt Duncan
6. Gavin Hastings
7. Scott Hastings
8. John Jeffrey
9. Roy Laidlaw
10. Iain Milne
11. Iain Paxton
12. Keith Robertson
13. John Rutherford
14. David Sole
15. Alan Tomes
16. Iwan Tukalo
17. Derek White
18. Douglas Wyllie

== Wales ==
Head coach: Tony Gray

1. Richie Collins
2. Malcolm Dacey
3. Jonathan Davies
4. Phil Davies
5. John Devereux
6. Ieuan Evans
7. Stuart Evans
8. Peter Francis
9. Adrian Hadley
10. Kevin Hopkins
11. Billy James
12. Robert Jones
13. Paul Moriarty
14. Bob Norster
15. Kevin Phillips
16. Dai Pickering (c.)
17. Steve Sutton
18. Paul Thorburn
19. Glen Webbe
20. Jeff Whitefoot
21. Mark Wyatt
