= 1989 France rugby union tour of New Zealand =

Summary
P	W	D	L
Total
8	4	0	4
Test match
2	0	0	2
Opponent
P	W	D	L
New Zealand
2	0	0	2

The 1989 France rugby union tour of New Zealand was a series of eight matches played in June and July 1989 by the France national rugby union team in New Zealand. The team won four matches and lost four, including defeats to provincial teams Southland and Wellington. France lost both matches of the two-match test series against the New Zealand national rugby union team.

== Results ==
Scores and results list France's points tally first.

	Date	Opponent	Location	Result	Score
Match 1	7 June	Counties	Pukekohe Stadium, Pukekohe	Won	24–21
Match 2	10 June	Manawatu	The Showgrounds Oval, Palmerston North	Won	28–23
Match 3	13 June	Southland	Homestead Stadium, Invercargill	Lost	7–12
Match 4	17 June	NEW ZEALAND	Lancaster Park, Christchurch	Lost	17–25
Match 5	21 June	Seddon Shield Unions' Selection	Lansdowne Park, Blenheim	Won	39–13
Match 6	24 June	Wellington	Athletic Park, Wellington	Lost	23–24
Match 7	27 June	Bay of Plenty	International Stadium, Rotorua	Won	22–18
Match 8	1 July	NEW ZEALAND	Eden Park, Auckland	Lost	20–34

== Touring party ==
- Manager: Jacques Fouroux
- Assistant manager: Henri Fourès
- Captain: Pierre Berbizier

=== Full backs ===
- Serge Blanco

=== Three-quarters ===
- Philippe Sella
- Franck Mesnel
- Patrice Lagisquet
- Stéphane Weller
- Philippe Bérot
- Peyo Hontas
- Jean-Baptiste Lafond
- Denis Charvet
- Marc Andrieu

=== Half-backs ===
- Philippe Rougé-Thomas
- Pierre Berbizier
- Henri Sanz
- Jean-Marc Lescure

=== Forwards ===
- Philippe Gallart
- Marc Pujolle
- Dominique Bouet
- Jean Condom
- Dominique Erbani
- Alain Carminati
- Olivier Roumat
- Laurent Rodriguez
- Thierry Devergie
- Philippe Benetton
- Jean-François Tordo
- Hervé Chabowski
- Jean-Pierre Garuet-Lempirou
- Pascal Beraud
- Pascal Ondarts
