= 1988 Argentina rugby union tour of France =

Series of eight matches played by the Argentina national rugby union team in 1988

Summary
P	W	D	L
Total
8	3	0	5
Test match
2	0	0	2
Opponent
P	W	D	L
France
2	0	0	2

The 1988 Argentina rugby union tour of France was a series of eight matches played by the Argentina national rugby union team in October and November 1988.

== Matches ==
18 October 1988

Burgundy XV	18 - 15	Argentina XV
Pen: Carteau 3, Lafond 3		Pen: Baetti 5

Parc des Sports, Dijon
Referee: Jean Pierre Doulcet

Burgundy XV: Lafond ( (substituted on) 55' T.Catinot); Ponel, Bordenave, Martins, Carteau; Mesnel, Boudet; Brunat, Pronovi, Monteil; Pluss.Theroin; Fayard ( (substituted on) 60' T.Fuertes), Bouillot, Romand.
Argentina: A.Scolni; C.Mendy, F.Turnes, M.Loffreda, D.Cuesta Silva; R.Madero, D.Baetti; J.Allen (capt.), M.Carreras, P.Garretón; A.Iachetti, E.Branca; D.Cash, J.Angelillo, S.Dengra.

23 October 1988

Auvergne XV	23 - 19	Argentina XV
Try: García, Nicol; Blanc; Con: Trille; Pen: Trille 3		Try: Cuesta Silva, Carreras; Con: Baetti; Pen: Baetti 3

Stade Marcel-Michelin, Clermont Ferrand
Referee: René Hourquet

Auvergne XV :Langlade; García, Nicol, Blanc, Saint André; Trille, Hondagne ( (substituted on) 29' T.Pradier); Lecompte, Arthapignet, Janeczek; Deslandes, D.Gaby ( (substituted on) 56' T.P.Gaby); Heyer, Rizon, Marocco.
Argentina: A.Scolni; D.Cuesta Silva, M.Loffreda, F.Turnes, C.Mendy; R.Madero, D.Baetti; M.Bertranou, M.Carreras, J.Allen (capt.); E.Branca A.Iachetti; P.Urbano, J.Angelillo, D.Cash.

25 October 1988

Pays Catalan XV	15 - 24	Argentina XV
Try: Bey; Con: Amalric; Pen: Amalric 3		Try: Cuesta Silva, Conti; Mesón, Madero; Con: Mesón; Pen: Mesón, Loffreda

Stade Aimé Giral, Perpignan
Referee: Claude Debat

Catalan XV: Tresene; Impinna, Enrique, Bonneval, Nivet; Amalric, Pages; Christaud-Braize, Alegre, Bey; Beraud, Autones ( (substituted on) 72' T.Campredon); Fontaine, Fabre, Rebujent.
Argentina: S.Salvat; J.Soler, M.Loffreda, S.Mesón, D.Cuesta Silva; R.Madero, F.Gómez; P.Garreton, J.Allen (capt.), F.Conti; P.Buabse, M.Valesani; P.Urbano, A.Courreges, D.González.

29 October 1988

Périgord-Agenais XV	10 - 16	Argentina XV
Try: Carbonne; Pen: Berot 2		Try: Mendy; Pen: Turnes 4

Marmande
Referee: Gaston Salle

Périgord-Agenais XV: Berot; Bonneval, Martini, Carbonnel, Gleize; Peuchlestrade ( (substituted on) 42' T.Authier), Modin; Janik, Carminatti, Gratton; Erbani, Pujade; Galesio, Dubroca (capt.), Tolot.
Argentina: S.Salvat; G.Terán; F.Turres, M.Loffreda, C.Mendy; R.Madero, F.Silvestre; J.Allen (capt.), G.Milano ( (substituted on) 47' T.Bertranou), F.Conti; E.Branca, A.Iachetti; D.Cash, J.Angelillo, S.Dengra.

1 November 1988

Poitou-Charentes XV	31 - 22	Argentina XV
Try: Peytavin, Lespinasse; Courtiol; Con: Lafond 2 Pen: Lafond 3, Le Bourhis; Drop: Barboteau		Try: Mesón, Dominguez; Con: Dominguez; Pen: Dominguez 4

Niort
Referee: Philippe Neyrat

Poitou-Charentes XV: Lafond ( (substituted on) 78' Bichetton); Daguzan, Le Bourhis, Lespinasse, Peytavin; Barboteau, Mazille; Dupiney, Maffini ( (substituted on) 65' Cot), Courtiols; Picard, Mougeot; Garuet, Ducluzeau, Marocco.
Argentina: A.Scolni; G.Terán, S.Mesón, P.Garzón, J.Soler; D.Dominguez, A.Soares Gache; M.Bertranou, M.Valesani, M.Carreras; E.Branca, P.Buabse; P.Urbano, A.Courreges, D.González.

5 November 1988

France	29 - 9	Argentina
Try: Blanco 2, Cecillon; Lagisquet, Rodriguez; Con: Berot 3 Pen: Berot		Pen: Turnes 3

La Beaujoire, Nantes
Attendance: 32.000
Referee: Alexander R. MacNeill (ARU)

France			Argentina
Serge Blanco	FB	15	FB	Alejandro Scolni
Philippe Berot	W	14	W	Diego Cuesta Silva
Philippe Sella	C	13	C	Marcelo Loffreda
Marc Andrieu	C	12	C	Fabian Turnes
Patrice Lagisquet	W	11	W	Cristian Mendy
Franck Mesnel	FH	10	FH	Rafael Madero
Henri Sanz	SH	9	SH	Federico Silvestre
Laurent Rodriguez	N8	8	N8	Jorge Allen (capt.)
Marc Cecillon	F	7	F	Pablo Garreton
Eric Champ	F	6	F	Fernando Conti
Jean Condom	L	5	L	Eliseo Branca
Gilles Bourguignon	L	4	L	Alejandro Iachetti
Pascal Ondarts	P	3	P	Serafin Dengra
(capt.) Philippe Dintrans	H	2	H	Juan Jose Angelillo
Louis Armary	P	1	P	Diego Cash

8 November 1988

Batallón de Joinville	15 - 35	Argentina XV
Try: Nivet, penalty try Con: Farencq 2 Pen: Farencq		Try: Terán 2, Loffreda; Buabse, penalty try Con: Dominguez 3 Pen: Dominguez 3

Melun
Referee: Gerome Bressy

11 November 1988

France	28 - 18	Argentina
Try: Andrieu, Cecillon; Sanz, Sella; Con: Berot 3 Pen: Berot 2		Pen: Turnes 5 Drop: Madero

Métropole, Lille
Attendance: 21.000
Referee: Alexander R. MacNeill (ARU)

France			Argentina
Serge Blanco	FB	15	FB	Alejandro Scolni
Philippe Berot	W	14	W	Diego Cuesta Silva
Philippe Sella	C	13	C	Marcelo Loffreda
Marc Andrieu	C	12	C	Fabian Turnes
Patrice Lagisquet	W	11	W	Cristian Mendy
Franck Mesnel	FH	10	FH	Rafael Madero
Henri Sanz	SH	9	SH	Alfredo Soares Gache
(capt.) Laurent Rodriguez	N8	8	N8	Gustavo Milano
Marc Cecillon	F	7	F	Jorge Allen (capt.)
Eric Champ	F	6	F	Pablo Garreton
Jean Condom	L	5	L	Eliseo Branca
Alain Lorieux	L	4	L	Alejandro Iachetti
Pascal Ondarts	P	3	P	Serafin Dengra
Philippe Marocco	H	2	H	Juan Jose Angelillo
Louis Armary	P	1	P	Diego Cash
		Replacements
Pierre Harislur-Arthapignet	H		H	Dardo Gonzalez
			C	Sebastian Salvat

== Sources ==
- Union Argentina de Rugby (December 1988). "MEMORIA Temporada año 1988" (PDF) (in Spanish). Archived from the original (.doc) on 2012-11-01.
- Stephen Jones, ed. (1989). Rothmans Rugby Union Yearbook 1989-90. Queen Anne Press. ISBN 0-3561-7862-5.
