= French Barbarians =

French invitation rugby union team for 15 and over

French Barbarians (French: Barbarians français)
- Nickname: Les Baa-Baas
- Founded: 1979
- Coach: Denis Charvet
Team kit

First match
- French Barbarians 26 – 22 Scotland (2 May 1980)

Largest win
- French Barbarians 45 – 4 Japan (27 October 1985)

Largest defeat
- XV du Président 83 – 12 French Barbarians (20 September 2003)

The Barbarian Rugby Club, more commonly known as the French Barbarians, is a rugby union team formed in 1979 and based in France. It was founded as an amateur invitational team modeled on the Barbarian F.C.

From the start of the 2017–18 season, the French Barbarians became the official second national team of the French Rugby Federation, which had previously designated either the France U20 side or France A as that team. This decision was reversed in 2019, to allow for the creation of a new second national team as a development side (above the Under 20s team but below the first men's team).

The French Barbarians play in sky, navy and royal blue hooped jerseys. As with the original Barbarians, players retain the socks from their "home" club strip.

== History ==
Jean-Claude Skrela founded the club after he had played for, and adored, the original Barbarians in the later days of his career. Through the amateur era, all players chosen for the side were either French or played for French clubs.

One of the most recent matches was against the Argentina national team (Los Pumas) in early 2007, as part of their preparation for the 2007 Rugby World Cup. For the game, held in Biarritz, the coaches were Jacques Delmas (Biarritz), Patrice Lagisquet (Biarritz) and were captained by Thomas Lièvremont. While in 2008 they beat Canada in Victoria. They played with Argentina at José Amalfitani Stadium in Buenos Aires on 20 June 2009 as part of the mid-year test series, and lost 32–18.

In 2016 the French Barbarians beat Australia XV by 19–11 in their first match against an Australian side for over twenty years. And in late 2017 they beat the Māori All Blacks 19–15, which was the first time playing that side.

== Matches against international sides ==
Date	Venue	Opposing Teams	For	Against	Result
1 May 1980	Stade Armandie, Agen	Scotland	26	22	Won
7 November 1981	Stade Jean Dauger, Bayonne	New Zealand	18	28	Lost
11 November 1982	Stade Maurice Boyau, Dax	Argentina	8	22	Lost
23 November 1983	Stade Mayol, Toulon	Australia	21	23	Lost
22 October 1985	Stade Jean-Martinaud, Cognac	Japan	45	4	Won
10 May 1986	Stade Armandie, Agen	Scotland	32	19	Won
11 November 1986	Stade Marcel-Deflandre, La Rochelle	New Zealand	12	26	Lost
22 May 1988	Stade Marcel-Deflandre, La Rochelle	Ireland	41	26	Won
22 October 1989	Stade Chaban-Delmas, Bordeaux	Fiji	16	32	Lost
27 October 1990	Stade Armandie, Agen	New Zealand	13	23	Lost
31 October 1992	Stadium Lille Métropole, Villeneuve-d'Ascq	South Africa	25	20	Won
11 November 1993	Stade Marcel-Michelin, Clermont-Ferrand	Australia	26	43	Lost
1 November 1995	Stade Mayol, Toulon	New Zealand	19	34	Lost
23 November 1996	Stade Amédée-Domenech, Brive	South Africa	30	22	Won
11 November 1997	Parc des Sports Aguiléra, Biarritz	South Africa	40	22	Won
11 November 1998	Stade Pierre Rajon, Bourgoin-Jallieu	Argentina	38	30	Won
27 May 2000	Millennium Stadium, Cardiff	Wales	33	40	Lost
7 November 2000	Stade Félix-Bollaert, Lens	New Zealand	23	21	Won
18 November 2001	Stade Mayol, Toulon	Fiji	15	17	Lost
20 September 2003	Parc des Sports et de l'Amitié, Narbonne	XV du Président (Note: Containing mostly the same players as France's 2003 World Cup squad—except for those who played on the Baa-Baas such as Yannick Bru or Sébastien Chabal—this designation exists to circumvent World Rugby regulations and the Board's authority on allowing matches with international squads to be organized.)	12	83	Lost
3 March 2007	Parc des Sports Aguiléra, Biarritz	Argentina	14	28	Lost
28 June 2008	Esquimalt's Bullen Park, Victoria	Canada	17	7	Won
20 June 2009	José Amalfitani Stadium, Buenos Aires	Argentina	18	32	Lost
26 November 2010	Stade des Alpes, Grenoble	Tonga	27	28	Lost
4 June 2011	Independiente Stadium, Avellaneda	Argentina	19	23	Lost
11 June 2011	Estadio Centenario, Resistencia	Argentina	21	18	Won
20 June 2012	Chichibunomiya Rugby Stadium, Tokyo	Japan	40	21	Won
24 June 2012	Chichibunomiya Rugby Stadium, Tokyo	Japan	51	18	Won
25 November 2012	Stade Océane, Le Havre	Japan	64	41	Won
16 November 2013	Stade Marcel-Michelin, Clermont-Ferrand	Samoa	20	19	Won
14 November 2014	Stade Mayol, Toulon	Namibia	35	14	Won
20 June 2015	Old Resian Club, Rosario	Argentina	28	22	Won
26 June 2015	La Plata Rugby Club, La Plata	Argentina	9	21	Lost
24 November 2016	Stade Chaban-Delmas, Bordeaux	(Australia) Wallaby XV	19	11	Won
10 November 2017	Stade Chaban-Delmas, Bordeaux	(New Zealand) Māori All Blacks	19	15	Won
31 May 2018	Dinamo Arena, Tbilisi	(Georgia (country)) Georgia	15	16	Lost
10 November 2018	Stade Chaban Delmas, Bordeaux	Tonga	38	49	Lost
13 November 2021	Stade de Gerland, Lyon	Tonga	42	17	Won
1 July 2022	Aveva Stadium, Houston	United States	21	26	Lost

=== Overall ===
Opponent	Played	Won	Lost	Drawn	% Won
Argentina	8	3	5	0	37.5%
Australia	2	0	2	0	0%
Australia XV	1	1	0	0	100%
Canada	1	1	0	0	100%
Fiji	2	0	2	0	0%
XV du Président	1	0	1	0	0%
Georgia	1	0	1	0	0%
Ireland	1	1	0	0	100%
Japan	4	4	0	0	100%
Namibia	1	1	0	0	100%
New Zealand	5	1	4	0	20%
(New Zealand) Māori All Blacks	1	1	0	0	100%
Samoa	1	1	0	0	100%
Scotland	2	2	0	0	100%
South Africa	3	3	0	0	100%
Tonga	3	1	2	0	33%
United States	1	0	1	0	0%
Wales	1	0	1	0	0%
Total	38	20	18	0	52.63%

== Current squad ==
French Barbarians squad to face the United States on 1 July 2022.

Coaches: (France) Christian Labit and (France) Kevin Gourdon

Note: Bold denotes players that have represented the French Barbarians in previous matches. Italics represents uncapped players. Note: Flags indicate national union under World Rugby eligibility rules.

Player	Position	Date of birth (age)	Club/province	Union
**Clément Maynadier**	Hooker	11 October 1988 (age 37)	Bordeaux Bègles	France
**Adrien Pélissié**	Hooker	7 August 1990 (age 35)	Clermont Auvergne	France
**Nicolas Corato**	Prop	7 October 1997 (age 28)	Pau	France
Arthur Joly	Prop	20 February 1988 (age 38)	Perpignan	France
Jefferson Poirot	Prop	11 January 1992 (age 34)	Bordeaux Bègles	France
**Sébastien Taofifénua**	Prop	21 March 1992 (age 34)	Lyon	France
Alexandre Roumat	Lock	27 June 1997 (age 29)	Bordeaux Bègles	France
**Romain Sazy**	Lock	14 October 1986 (age 39)	La Rochelle	France
Esteban Abadie	Back row	1 December 1997 (age 28)	Brive	France
Anthime Hemery	Back row	9 January 2001 (age 25)	Racing 92	France
Louis Picamoles	Back row	5 February 1985 (age 41)	Bordeaux Bègles	France
William Wavrin	Back row	6 January 1991 (age 35)	Stade Montois	France
Thomas Berjon	Scrum-half	12 April 1998 (age 28)	La Rochelle	France
Samuel Marques	Scrum-half	8 December 1988 (age 37)	Carcassonne	Portugal
Louis Foursans	Fly-half	29 January 2002 (age 24)	Montpellier	France
**François Trinh-Duc**	Fly-half	11 November 1986 (age 39)	Bordeaux Bègles	France
Raphaël Lagarde	Fly-half	30 October 1988 (age 37)	Agen	France
Pierre Aguillon	Centre	27 March 1987 (age 39)	Castres	France
**Jean-Baptiste Dubié**	Centre	16 July 1989 (age 36)	Bordeaux Bègles	France
Adrien Lapègue	Wing	21 October 1998 (age 27)	Stade Français	France
**Mathieu Acebes**	Fullback	1 August 1987 (age 38)	Perpignan	France
Nans Ducuing	Fullback	6 November 1991 (age 34)	Bordeaux Bègles	France

== Former players ==
- (Algeria) Malik Hamadache
- (Argentina) Miguel Avramovic
- (Argentina) Lucas Borges
- (Argentina) Mauricio Reggiardo
- (Argentina) Alberto Vernet Basualdo
- (Argentina) Benjamin Urdapilleta
- (Australia) David Campese
- (Australia) John Eales
- (Australia) Nick Farr-Jones
- (Australia) James O'Connor
- (Australia) George Smith
- (Cameroon) Robins Tchale-Watchou
- (Canada) Mike James
- (Ivory Coast) Silvère Tian
- (England) Richard Pool-Jones
- (England) Peter Winterbottom
- (Fiji) Rupeni Caucaunibuca
- (Fiji) Waisale Serevi
- (Fiji) Marika Vunibaka
- (France) Louis Armary
- (France) David Aucagne
- (France) Teddy Baubigny
- (France) Alexi Balès
- (France) Pierre-Louis Barassi
- (France) Abdelatif Benazzi
- (France) Philippe Benetton
- (France) Pierre Berbizier
- (France) Philippe Bernat-Salles
- (France) Serge Betsen
- (France) Serge Blanco
- (France) Éric Bonneval
- (France) Olivier Brouzet
- (France) Nicolas Brusque
- (France) Laurent Cabannes
- (France) Jean-Marie Cadieu
- (France) Didier Camberabero
- (France) Louis Carbonel
- (France) Alain Carminati
- (France) Thomas Castaignède
- (France) Richard Castel
- (France) Marc Cécillon
- (France) Denis Charvet
- (France) Gérard Cholley
- (France) Vincent Clerc
- (France) Didier Codorniou
- (France) Franck Comba
- (France) Jean Condom
- (France) Jean-Jacques Crenca
- (France) Dylan Cretin
- (France) Marc Dal Maso
- (France) Marc de Rougemont
- (France) Christophe Deylaud
- (France) Philippe Dintrans
- (France) Christophe Dominici
- (France) Yves Donguy
- (France) Pierre Dospital
- (France) Michel Droitecourt
- (France) Daniel Dubroca
- (France) Jean-Baptiste Élissalde
- (France) Jean-Pierre Élissalde
- (France) Dominique Erbani
- (France) Jérôme Fillol
- (France) Jacques Fouroux
- (France) Fabien Galthié
- (France) Xavier Garbajosa
- (France) Jean-Pierre Garuet-Lempirou
- (France) Stéphane Glas
- (France) Arthur Gomes
- (France) Jean-Michel Gonzalez
- (France) Antoine Guillamon
- (France) Francis Haget
- (France) Dominique Harize
- (France) Cédric Heymans
- (France) Aubin Hueber
- (France) Jean-François Imbernon
- (France) Jean-Luc Joinel
- (France) Jordan Joseph
- (France) Jean-Baptiste Lafond
- (France) Patrice Lagisquet
- (France) Guy Laporte
- (France) Christophe Laussucq
- (France) Jean-Patrick Lescarboura
- (France) Marc Lièvremont
- (France) Thomas Lièvremont
- (France) Sylvain Marconnet
- (France) Jimmy Marlu
- (France) Tony Marsh
- (France) Rémy Martin
- (France) Olivier Merle
- (France) Franck Mesnel
- (France) Frédéric Michalak
- (France) Vincent Moscato
- (France) Émile Ntamack
- (France) Romain Ntamack
- (France) Pascal Ondarts
- (France) Alain Paco
- (France) Michel Palmié
- (France) Boris Palu
- (France) Robert Paparemborde
- (France) Laurent Pardo
- (France) Adrien Pélissié
- (France) Fabien Pelous
- (France) Jean-Baptiste Poux
- (France) Thibaut Privat
- (France) Pierre Rabadan
- (France) Swan Rebbadj
- (France) Arthur Retière
- (France) Jean-Pierre Rives
- (France) Laurent Rodriguez
- (France) Jean-Pierre Romeu
- (France) Aurélien Rougerie
- (France) Olivier Roumat
- (France) Philippe Saint-André
- (France) Jean-Luc Sadourny
- (France) Philippe Sella
- (France) David Skrela
- (France) Jean-Claude Skrela
- (France) Cédric Soulette
- (France) Jérôme Thion
- (France) Jean-François Tordo
- (Italy) Diego Domínguez
- (Ireland) Hugo MacNeill
- (Ireland) Fergus Slattery
- (New Zealand) Ian Jones
- (New Zealand) Josh Kronfeld
- (New Zealand) Simon Mannix
- (New Zealand) Chris Masoe
- (New Zealand) David Smith
- (Poland) Grzegorz Kacała
- (South Africa) Naas Botha
- (South Africa) Brett Gosper
- (South Africa) Andre Joubert
- (Samoa) Filipo Toala

== Honours ==
- Melrose Sevens
  - Champions (1): 1983

== See also ==
- Australian Barbarians
- Brussels Barbarians
- Fiji Barbarians
- New Zealand Barbarians
- South African Barbarians
