= 1987 Rugby World Cup final =

Rugby match in Auckland, New Zealand

- Event: 1987 Rugby World Cup
New Zealand	France
(New Zealand)	(France)
29	9
- Date: 20 June 1987
- Venue: Eden Park, Auckland
- Referee: Kerry Fitzgerald (Australia)
- Attendance: 48,035

The 1987 Rugby World Cup final was the final match of the 1987 Rugby World Cup, the first Rugby World Cup played.

It was played at Eden Park in Auckland, New Zealand, on 20 June 1987 between the hosts New Zealand and France. The referee of the match was the Australian Kerry Fitzgerald and the touch judges were Jim Fleming and Brian Anderson, both from Scotland.

New Zealand won the match 29–9 with three tries, one conversion, four penalties and a drop goal, becoming the first winners of the Rugby World Cup.

This same matchup would be contested again at the 2011 final, with New Zealand again becoming the world champions.

== Match ==
=== Summary ===
==== First half ====
In front of a capacity crowd at Eden Park, hosts New Zealand met France in the inaugural Rugby World Cup final. France seemed lacklustre following their amazing win over Australia in the semi-final. New Zealand played a mainly kicking game in the first half with Grant Fox kicking for territory and position. A Fox drop goal after 14 minutes settled home nerves. A try by the World Cup's star performer Michael Jones, followed just three minutes later. Jones' try was converted by Fox, a tense final was finely balanced at half time with New Zealand leading France 9–0.

==== Second half ====
France came out with renewed vigour after the break and a Didier Camberabero penalty four minutes into the half finally put France on the scoreboard. The France fightback was, however, short-lived and New Zealand forward power in the setpiece and open play was to the fore. Tries by David Kirk and John Kirwan together with the relentlessly accurate goal-kicking of Fox meant that going into the final moments New Zealand led 29–3.

A final surge near the whistle led to a France try through Pierre Berbizier. The try was converted as the last kick of the game by Didier Camberabero.

The final had hardly lived up to its billing, probably due to the exertions by France in their semi-final win. It was however fitting that tries from three stars of the tournament, Jones, Kirk and Kirwan, won the contest and gave New Zealand the Webb Ellis Cup.

=== Details ===
20 June 1987

New Zealand	29–9	France
Try: Jones; Kirk; Kirwan; Con: Fox; Pen: Fox (4); Drop: Fox	Report	Try: Berbizier; Con: Camberabero; Pen: Camberabero

Eden Park, Auckland
Attendance: 48,035
Referee: Kerry Fitzgerald (Australia)

New Zealand	France

FB	15	John Gallagher
RW	14	John Kirwan
OC	13	Joe Stanley
IC	12	Warwick Taylor
LW	11	Craig Green
FH	10	Grant Fox
SH	9	David Kirk (c)
N8	8	Buck Shelford
OF	7	Michael Jones
BF	6	Alan Whetton
RL	5	Gary Whetton
LL	4	Murray Pierce
TP	3	John Drake
HK	2	Sean Fitzpatrick
LP	1	Steve McDowall
Coach:
(New Zealand) Brian Lochore

FB	15	Serge Blanco
RW	14	Didier Camberabero
OC	13	Philippe Sella
IC	12	Denis Charvet
LW	11	Patrice Lagisquet
FH	10	Franck Mesnel
SH	9	Pierre Berbizier
N8	8	Laurent Rodriguez
OF	7	Dominique Erbani
BF	6	Éric Champ
RL	5	Jean Condom
LL	4	Alain Lorieux
TP	3	Jean-Pierre Garuet-Lempirou
HK	2	Daniel Dubroca (c)
LP	1	Pascal Ondarts
Coach:
(France) Jacques Fouroux
