= 1990 Five Nations Championship =

Rugby union championship

- Date: 20 January - 24 March 1990
- Countries: England; Ireland; France; Scotland; Wales

Tournament statistics
- Champions: Scotland (13th title)
- Grand Slam: Scotland (3rd title)
- Triple Crown: Scotland (10th title)
- Matches played: 10
- Tries scored: 36 (3.6 per match)
- Top point scorer: (England) Simon Hodgkinson (42 points)
- Top try scorer: (England) Rory Underwood (4 tries)

The 1990 Five Nations Championship was the 61st series of the Five Nations Championship, an annual rugby union competition between the major rugby union national teams in Europe. The tournament consisted of ten matches held between 20 January and 24 March 1990.

The tournament was the 61st in its then format as the Five Nations; including its former incarnation as the Home Nations Championship, the 1990 Five Nations was the 96th championship.

== Summary ==
The championship was contested by England, France, Ireland, Scotland and Wales. Scotland won the tournament, achieving a final 13–7 victory over England to win the Grand Slam, their first since 1984 and third overall in the Five Nations. This was also their thirteenth outright victory, including nine victories in the Home Nations, excluding eight titles shared with other countries. It was the third occasion, after 1978 and 1984, on which two teams each with three victories faced off against each other in the final round of matches, with both capable of completing a Grand Slam with a victory, and the first time that the Triple Crown had also been at stake at the same time, as a result of England and Scotland's earlier victories over the other Home Nations. England and France placed second and third with three and two wins respectively, while Ireland and Wales placed fourth and fifth with one victory and none. This was Wales's first whitewash in Championship history.

This was Scotland's final Grand Slam in the Five Nations and penultimate overall win, as they would later win the final 1999 Five Nations Championship on points difference. It also remains Scotland's most recent Grand Slam win, as they have yet to win a Grand Slam since Italy joined what became the Six Nations Championship in 2000.

== Participants ==
The teams involved were:

Nation	Venue	City	Head coach	Captain
England	Twickenham	London	Geoff Cooke	Will Carling
France	Parc des Princes	Paris	Jacques Fouroux	Pierre Berbizier/Laurent Rodriguez
Ireland	Lansdowne Road	Dublin	Ciaran Fitzgerald	Willie Anderson/Donal Lenihan
Scotland	Murrayfield	Edinburgh	Ian McGeechan	David Sole
Wales	National Stadium	Cardiff	John Ryan (resigned)/Ron Waldron	Robert Jones

== Table ==
Pos	Team	Pld	W	D	L	PF	PA	PD	Pts
1	Scotland	4	4	0	0	60	26	+34	8
2	England	4	3	0	1	90	26	+64	6
3	France	4	2	0	2	67	78	−11	4
4	Ireland	4	1	0	3	36	75	−39	2
5	Wales	4	0	0	4	42	90	−48	0

== Results ==
1990-01-20

Wales	19–29	France
Try: Titley; Pen: Thorburn (4); Drop: D. Evans	Report	Tries: Camberabero; Lafond; Lagisquet; L. Rodriguez; Sella; Con: Camberabero (3); Pen: Camberabero

National Stadium, Cardiff
Attendance: 58000

1990-01-20

England	23–0	Ireland
Tries: Egerton; Guscott; Probyn; Underwood; Con: Hodgkinson (2); Pen: Hodgkinson	Report

Twickenham, London

1990-02-03

Ireland	10–13	Scotland
Try: J. Fitzgerald; Pen: Kiernan (2)	Report	Tries: White (2); Con: Chalmers; Pen: Chalmers

Lansdowne Road, Dublin

1990-02-03

France	7–26	England
Try: Lagisquet; Pen: Charvet	Report	Tries: Carling; Guscott; Underwood; Con: Hodgkinson; Pen: Hodgkinson (4)

Parc des Princes, Paris
Attendance: 49,370

1990-02-17

Scotland	21–0	France
Tries: Calder; Tukalo; Con: Chalmers (2); Pen: Chalmers (2), Hastings	Report

Murrayfield, Edinburgh
Attendance: 58,000

1990-02-17

England	34–6	Wales
Tries: Carling; Hill; Underwood (2); Con: Hodgkinson (3); Pen: Hodgkinson (4)	Report	Try: Davies; Con: Thorburn

Twickenham, London

- Wales coach John Ryan resigned after this result, being replaced latter by Ron Waldron

1990-03-03

France	31–12	Ireland
Tries: Lagisquet; Mesnel (2); Con: Camberabero (2); Pen: Camberabero (5)	Report	Pen: Kiernan (4)

Parc des Princes, Paris
Attendance: 45,077

1990-03-03

Wales	9–13	Scotland
Try: Emyr; Con: Thorburn; Pen: Thorburn	Report	Try: Cronin; Pen: Chalmers (3)

National Stadium, Cardiff

1990-03-17

Scotland	13–7	England
Try: Stanger; Pen: Chalmers (3)	Report	Try: Guscott; Pen: Hodgkinson

Murrayfield, Edinburgh

1990-03-24

Ireland	14–8	Wales
Tries: Kingston; McBride; Smith; Con: Kiernan	Report	Tries: Ford; Llewellyn

Lansdowne Road, Dublin
