= 1987–88 French Rugby Union Championship =

French Rugby Championship 1987–88
- Countries: France
- Number of teams: 80 teams
- Champions: Agen
- Runners-up: Stadoceste

The 1987–88 French Rugby Union Championship was won by Agen that beat Stadoceste (Tarbes) in the final.

== Formula ==
- The tournament was played by 80 clubs divided in sixteen pools of five. .
- The two better of each pool (a sum of 32 clubs) were admitted to the group A to play for the title
- In the second round the 32 clubs of group A were divided in four pools of eight.
- The four better of each pool of group A (16 clubs) were qualified to play the knockout stage

== Group A Qualification to knockout stage ==
The teams are listed as the ranking, in bold the teams admitted to "last 16" round.

**Pool 1**

- **Touloun**
- **Agen**
- **Grenoble**
- **Stadoceste**
- Béziers
- Lourdes
- Saint-Jean-de-Luz
- Pau

**Pool 3**

- **Racing**
- **Toulouse**
- **Bayonne**
- **Montferrand**
- Bourgoin-Jallieu
- Biarritz
- Romans
- Montchanin

**Pool 2**

- **Dax**
- **Bègles-Bordeaux**
- **Graulhet**
- **Perpignan**
- Aurillac
- Valence
- Auch
- Tulle

**Pool 4**

- **Narbonne**
- **Brive**
- **Mont-de-Marsan**
- **Tyrosse**
- Stade Bagnérais
- RRC Nice
- Marmande
- Hyères

== Knockout stages ==
=== "Last 16" ===
In bold the clubs qualified for the next round

Team 1	Team 2	1st match	2nd match
Bayonne	**Racing**	15-9	6-28
Grenoble	**Agen**	6-3	10-14
**Bègles-Bordeaux**	Mont-de-Marsan	7-13	10-0
Perpignan	**Narbonne**	12-21	12-24
Tyrosse	**Touloun**	9-13	16-49
Graulhet	**Toulouse**	9-13	12-25
Montferrand	**Brive**	12-15	13-24
**Stadoceste**	Dax	3-0	21-6

=== Quarter of finals ===
In bold the clubs qualified for the next round

Team 1	Team 2	Results
**Agen**	Racing	**22-15**
Bègles-Bordeaux	**Narbonne**	**20-26**
**Touloun**	Toulose	**21-9**
Brive	**Stadoceste**	**6-13**

=== Semifinals ===
Team 1	Team 2	Results
**Agen**	Narbonne	**19-9**
Toulon	**Stadoceste**	**12-31**

== Final ==
Teams	**Agen** - Stadoceste
Score	**9-3**
Date	28 May 1988
Venue	Parc des Princes, Paris
Referee	Guy Maurette
Line-up
Agen	Grégoire Lascubé, Daniel Dubroca, Laurent Seigne, Patrick Pujade, Bernard Mazzer, Jacques Gratton, Dominique Erbani, Michel Capot, Pierre Berbizier, Pierre Montlaur, Éric Gleyze, Gérald Mayout, Philippe Sella, Bernard Lacombe, Philippe Bérot; Replacements : Franck Vatbled, Éric Gayraud, Philippe Benetton, Éric Tolot, Patrick Schattel, Bruno Tolot
Stadoceste	Michel Crémaschi, Philippe Dintrans, Philippe Capdevielle, Philippe Pélissier, Alain Maleig, Thierry Janeczek, Andries van Heerden, Pierre Arthapignet, Michel Hondagné, Jean-Paul Trille, Éric Berdeu, Yves Crabe, Bruno Labat, Jacques Schneider, Vincent Romulus; Replacements : Jean-Pierre Laroche, Alain Teulé, Louis-Charles Régent, Bertrand Renaux, Thierry Gaye, Philippe Jouanolou
Scorers
Agen	2 penalties Bérot, 1 drop Montlaur
Stadoceste	1 penalty Trille
