= 1988 Five Nations Championship =

Rugby union tournament

- Date: 16 January – 19 March 1988
- Countries: England; Ireland; France; Scotland; Wales

Tournament statistics
- Champions: France and Wales
- Triple Crown: Wales (17th title)
- Matches played: 10
- Tries scored: 31 (3.1 per match)
- Top point scorer: (Scotland) Gavin Hastings (41 points)
- Top try scorer: (England) Chris Oti (3 tries)

The 1988 Five Nations Championship was the 59th series of the rugby union Five Nations Championship. Including the previous incarnations as the Home Nations and Five Nations, this was the ninety–fourth series of the northern hemisphere rugby union championship. Ten matches were played over five weekends between 16 January and 19 March. Wales and France were declared joint winners with six points each; it was the most recent time the Championship was shared between two or more nations as the rules were changed in 1994 to make such an event unlikely.

The final match of the tournament, England's victory over Ireland, was notable for the crowd bursting into song with "Swing Low, Sweet Chariot" as a response to the hat-trick of tries scored by England's Chris Oti (only the second black player, and the first for 80 years, to be capped by England). The song subsequently became the unofficial rugby anthem for England.

Wales missed out on a ninth Grand Slam after losing to France at Cardiff Arms Park.

== Participants ==
The teams involved were:

| Nation | Venue | City | Head coach | Captain |
|---|---|---|---|---|
| England | Twickenham | London | Geoff Cooke | Mike Harrison/Nigel Melville |
| France | Parc des Princes | Paris | Jacques Fouroux | Daniel Dubroca |
| Ireland | Lansdowne Road | Dublin | Jim Davidson | Donal Lenihan |
| Scotland | Murrayfield | Edinburgh | Jim Telfer | Gary Callander |
| Wales | National Stadium | Cardiff | Tony Gray | Bleddyn Bowen |

== Table ==
| Pos | Team | Pld | W | D | L | PF | PA | PD | Pts |
|---|---|---|---|---|---|---|---|---|---|
| 1 | Wales | 4 | 3 | 0 | 1 | 57 | 42 | +15 | 6 |
| 1 | France | 4 | 3 | 0 | 1 | 57 | 47 | +10 | 6 |
| 3 | England | 4 | 2 | 0 | 2 | 56 | 30 | +26 | 4 |
| 4 | Scotland | 4 | 1 | 0 | 3 | 67 | 68 | −1 | 2 |
| 4 | Ireland | 4 | 1 | 0 | 3 | 40 | 90 | −50 | 2 |

== Results ==
=== Round 1 ===
16 January 1988

| Ireland | 22–18 | Scotland |
| Try: Kiernan; MacNeill; Mullin; Con: Kiernan (2); Pen: Kiernan; Drop: Kiernan | Report | Try: S. Hastings; Laidlaw; Con: G. Hastings (2); Pen: G. Hastings (2) |

Lansdowne Road, Dublin
Referee: Roger Quittenton (England)

16 January 1988

| France | 10–9 | England |
| Try: Rodriguez; Pen: Bérot (2) | Report | Pen: Webb (2); Drop: Cusworth |

Parc des Princes, Paris
Attendance: 45,071
Referee: Owen Doyle (Ireland)

=== Round 2 ===
6 February 1988

| Scotland | 23–12 | France |
| Try: G. Hastings; Tukalo; Pen: G. Hastings (4); Drop: Cramb | Report | Try: Lagisquet; Con: Bérot; Pen: Bérot; Drop: Lescarboura |

Murrayfield, Edinburgh
Attendance: 65,000
Referee: Fransie Muller (South Africa)

6 February 1988

| England | 3–11 | Wales |
| Pen: Webb | Report | Try: Hadley (2); Drop: J. Davies |

Twickenham, London
Referee: Stephen Hilditch (Ireland)

=== Round 3 ===
20 February 1988

| France | 25–6 | Ireland |
| Try: Blanco; Camberabero; Carminati; Lagisquet; Sella; Con: Bérot; Drop: Camberabero | Report | Pen: Kiernan (2) |

Parc des Princes, Paris
Attendance: 49,130
Referee: Fransie Muller (South Africa)

20 February 1988

| Wales | 25–20 | Scotland |
| Try: J. Davies; I. Evans; Watkins; Con: Thorburn (2); Pen: Thorburn; Drop: J. Davies (2) | Report | Try: Calder; Duncan; Pen: G. Hastings (4) |

National Stadium, Cardiff
Referee: Yves Bressy (France)

=== Round 4 ===
5 March 1988

| Ireland | 9–12 | Wales |
| Try: Kingston; Con: Kiernan; Pen: Kiernan | Report | Try: Moriarty; Con: Thorburn; Pen: Thorburn; Drop: J. Davies |

Lansdowne Road, Dublin
Referee: Ray Megson (Scotland)

5 March 1988

| Scotland | 6–9 | England |
| Pen: G. Hastings (2) | Report | Pen: Webb (2); Drop: Andrew |

Murrayfield, Edinburgh
Referee: Winston Jones (Wales)

=== Round 5 ===
19 March 1988

| Wales | 9–10 | France |
| Try: I. Evans; Con: Thorburn; Pen: Thorburn | Report | Try: Lescarboura; Pen: Lafond (2) |

National Stadium, Cardiff
Attendance: 63,000
Referee: Fred Howard (England)

19 March 1988

| England | 35–3 | Ireland |
| Try: Oti (3); Rees; R. Underwood (2); Con: Andrew (3); Webb; Pen: Webb | Report | Drop: Kiernan |

Twickenham, London
Referee: Clive Norling (Wales)
