= 1987 Five Nations Championship =

Rugby union tournament

- Date: 7 February - 4 April 1987
- Countries: England; Ireland; France; Scotland; Wales

Tournament statistics
- Champions: France (8th title)
- Grand Slam: France (4th title)
- Matches played: 10
- Tries scored: 27 (2.7 per match)
- Top point scorer: (France) Philippe Bérot (37 points)
- Top try scorer: (France) Éric Bonneval (5 tries)

The 1987 Five Nations Championship was the fifty-eighth series of the rugby union Five Nations Championship. Including the previous incarnations as the Home Nations and Five Nations, this was the ninety-third series of the northern hemisphere rugby union championship. Ten matches were played over five weekends between 7 February and 4 April. This was the last time the championship would be interrupted by weather conditions until the Six Nations of 2012. France won with a Grand Slam, for the fourth time, while England won the Calcutta Cup, in their only win. Originally the opening matches of the Championship were due to be played on 17 January with England v Scotland at Twickenham and Wales v Ireland at Cardiff but both matches were called off due to the bad weather and postponed until 4 April

== Participants ==
| Nation | Venue | City | Head coach | Captain |
|---|---|---|---|---|
| England | Twickenham | London | Martin Green | Richard Hill/Mike Harrison |
| France | Parc des Princes | Paris | Jacques Fouroux | Daniel Dubroca |
| Ireland | Lansdowne Road | Dublin | Mick Doyle | Donal Lenihan |
| Scotland | Murrayfield | Edinburgh | Derrick Grant | Colin Deans |
| Wales | National Stadium | Cardiff | Tony Gray | Dai Pickering |

== Table ==
| Pos | Team | Pld | W | D | L | PF | PA | PD | Pts |
|---|---|---|---|---|---|---|---|---|---|
| 1 | France | 4 | 4 | 0 | 0 | 82 | 59 | +23 | 8 |
| 2 | Ireland | 4 | 2 | 0 | 2 | 57 | 46 | +11 | 4 |
| 2 | Scotland | 4 | 2 | 0 | 2 | 71 | 76 | −5 | 4 |
| 4 | Wales | 4 | 1 | 0 | 3 | 54 | 64 | −10 | 2 |
| 4 | England | 4 | 1 | 0 | 3 | 48 | 67 | −19 | 2 |

== Results ==
1987-02-07

| France | 16–9 | Wales |
| Tries: Bonneval; Mesnel; Con.: Bérot; Pen.: Bérot (2) | Report | Pen.: Thorburn (3) |

Parc des Princes, Paris
Attendance: 49,130
Referee: C. J. High (England)

1987-02-07

| Ireland | 17–0 | England |
| Tries: Crossan; Kiernan; Matthews; Con.: Kiernan; Pen.: Kiernan | Report |

Lansdowne Road, Dublin
Referee: René Hourquet (France)

1987-02-21

| England | 15–19 | France |
| Pen.: Rose (4); Drops: Andrew | | Tries: Bonneval; Sella; Con.: Bérot; Pen.: Bérot; Drops: Blanco; Mesnel |

Twickenham, London
Referee: J. M. Fleming (Scotland)

1987-02-21

| Scotland | 16–12 | Ireland |
| Tries: Laidlaw; Tukalo; Con.: G. Hastings; Drops: Rutherford (2) | | Tries: Lenihan; Con.: Kiernan; Pen.: Kiernan; Drops: Kiernan |

Murrayfield, Edinburgh
Referee: R. C. Quittenton (England)

1987-03-07

| France | 28–22 | Scotland |
| Tries: Bérot; Bonneval (3); Pen.: Bérot (3); Drops: Mesnel | | Tries: Beattie; S. Hastings; Con.: G. Hastings; Pen.: G. Hastings (4) |

Parc des Princes, Paris
Attendance: 49,130
Referee: K. H. Lawrence (New Zealand)

1987-03-07

| Wales | 19–12 | England |
| Tries: S. Evans; Pen.: Wyatt (5) | | Pen.: Rose (4) |

National Stadium, Cardiff
Referee: R. J. Megson (Scotland)

1987-03-21

| Ireland | 13–19 | France |
| Tries: Bradley; Ringland; Con.: Kiernan; Pen.: Kiernan | | Tries: Champ (2); Con.: Bérot; Pen.: Bérot (3) |

Lansdowne Road, Dublin
Attendance: 53,000
Referee: C. Norling (Wales)

1987-03-21

| Scotland | 21–15 | Wales |
| Tries: Beattie; Jeffrey; Con.: G. Hastings (2); Pen.: G. Hastings (2); Drops: Rutherford | | Tries: M. Jones; Con.: Wyatt; Pen.: Wyatt (2); Drops: J. Davies |

Murrayfield, Edinburgh
Referee: K. H. Lawrence (New Zealand)

1987-04-04

| Wales | 11–15 | Ireland |
| Tries: I. Evans; Norster; Pen.: Wyatt | | Tries: Dean; Mullin; Con.: Kiernan (2); Pen.: Kiernan |

National Stadium, Cardiff
Referee: G. Maurette (France)

1987-04-04

| England | 21–12 | Scotland |
| Tries: Harrison; Rose; Con.: Rose (2); Pen.: Rose (3) | | Tries: Robertson; Con.: G. Hastings; Pen.: G. Hastings (2) |

Twickenham, London
Referee: O.E. Doyle (Ireland)
