= 1989 Five Nations Championship =

Rugby union tournament

- Date: 21 January – 18 March 1989
- Countries: England; Ireland; France; Scotland; Wales

Tournament statistics
- Champions: France (9th title)
- Matches played: 10
- Tries scored: 28 (2.8 per match)
- Top point scorer: (Ireland) Michael Kiernan (37 points)
- Top try scorer: (France) Serge Blanco (4 tries)

The 1989 Five Nations Championship was the 60th series of the rugby union Five Nations Championship. Including the previous incarnations as the Home Nations and Five Nations, this was the 95th series of the northern hemisphere rugby union championship. Ten matches were played over five weekends between 21 January and 18 March. France won it with three wins and one defeat (against England), while none of the other four teams was able to win the Triple Crown. England entered the final round of matches knowing that a win would give them at least a share of the championship, but were overturned in Cardiff as Wales scored their only victory of the season. Scotland also could have taken the championship had they won in France - even a draw would have been enough, thanks to England's defeat - but France won the game to seal the title.

== Participants ==
The teams involved were:

Nation	Venue	City	Head coach	Captain
England	Twickenham	London	Geoff Cooke	Will Carling
France	Parc des Princes	Paris	Jacques Fouroux	Pierre Berbizier
Ireland	Lansdowne Road	Dublin	Jim Davidson	Phillip Matthews
Scotland	Murrayfield	Edinburgh	Ian McGeechan	Finlay Calder
Wales	National Stadium	Cardiff	John Ryan	Paul Thorburn

== Table ==
Pos	Team	Pld	W	D	L	PF	PA	PD	Pts
1	France	4	3	0	1	76	47	+29	6
2	England	4	2	1	1	48	27	+21	5
2	Scotland	4	2	1	1	75	59	+16	5
4	Ireland	4	1	0	3	64	92	−28	2
4	Wales	4	1	0	3	44	82	−38	2

Source: Global Sports Archive

== Results ==
21 January 1989

Ireland	21–26	France
Try: Mullin; Con: Kiernan; Pen: Kiernan (5)		Try: Blanco; Lafond; Lagisquet (2); Con: Lafond (2); Pen: Lafond (2)

Lansdowne Road, Dublin
Attendance: 52,000
Referee: Brian Anderson (Scotland)

21 January 1989

Scotland	23–7	Wales
Try: Armstrong; Chalmers; White; Con: Dods; Pen: Dods (2); Drop: Chalmers		Try: Hall; Pen: Bowen

Murrayfield Stadium, Edinburgh
Referee: Jean-Claude Doulcet (France)

4 February 1989

Wales	13–19	Ireland
Try: Jones; Pen: Thorburn (3)		Try: Dean; Mannion; Con: Kiernan; Pen: Kiernan (3)

Cardiff Arms Park, Cardiff
Referee: Roger Quittenton (England)

4 February 1989

England	12–12	Scotland
Pen: Andrew (2); Webb (2)		Try: Jeffrey; Con: Dods; Pen: Dods (2)

Twickenham Stadium, London
Referee: Guy Maurette (France)

- This is the first draw in the Five Nations since 1985 (Ireland 15–15 France)
- This is the first draw between England and Scotland since 1982
- England retained the Calcutta Cup

18 February 1989

France	31–12	Wales
Try: Berbizier; Blanco (2); Dintrans; Con: Lafond (3); Pen: Lafond (2); Drop: Mesnel		Pen: Thorburn (4)

Parc des Princes, Paris
Attendance: 50,370
Referee: Jim Fleming (Scotland)

18 February 1989

Ireland	3–16	England
Pen: Kiernan		Try: Moore; Richards; Con: Andrew; Pen: Andrew (2)

Lansdowne Road, Dublin
Referee: Les Peard (Wales)

4 March 1989

Scotland	37–21	Ireland
Try: Cronin; Jeffrey; Tukalo (3); Con: Dods (4); Pen: Dods (3)		Try: Dunlea; Mullin (2); Con: Kiernan (3); Pen: Kiernan

Murrayfield Stadium, Edinburgh
Referee: Kerry Fitzgerald (New Zealand)

4 March 1989

England	11–0	France
Try: Carling; Robinson; Pen: Andrew

Twickenham Stadium, London
Attendance: 62,500
Referee: Stephen Hilditch (Ireland)

18 March 1989

France	19–3	Scotland
Try: Berbizier; Blanco; Lagisquet; Con: Bérot (2); Pen: Bérot		Pen: Dods

Parc des Princes, Paris
Attendance: 49,370
Referee: Owen Doyle (Ireland)

18 March 1989

Wales	12–9	England
Try: Hall; Con: Thorburn; Pen: Thorburn (2)		Pen: Andrew (2); Drop: Andrew

Cardiff Arms Park, Cardiff
Referee: Kerry Fitzgerald (New Zealand)
