= Andries van Heerden =

France international rugby union player (born 1961)

- Born: 6 October 1961 (age 65) Cape Town, South Africa
- Height: 6 ft 5 in (196 cm)
- Weight: 225 lb (102 kg)

Rugby union career
- Position: No. 8
International career
Years	Team	Apps	(Points)
1992	France	2	(0)

Andries van Heerden (born 6 October 1961) is a French former rugby union international.

== Biography ==
=== Early life ===
Born in Cape Town, van Heerden grew up on a farm outside the city and played rugby for Western Province, before moving to France in 1986. He settled in the town of Tarbes in the south west of the country, acquiring French nationality after marrying a local.

=== Rugby union career ===
Van Heerden, a number eight, had a slender body shape than most forwards, but was an athletic and tireless player. He played most of his French rugby with Stadoceste Tarbais and was a member of the side which contested the final of the 1987–88 French Championship. In 1992, van Heerden became the second player of South African origin to be capped for France, when he made two Five Nations appearances, against England at Parc des Princes and Scotland at Murrayfield.

== See also ==
- List of France national rugby union players
