= Brett Gosper =

Executive and former rugby player (born 1959)

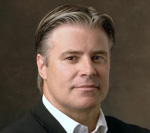
- Born: 21 June 1959 (age 66); Melbourne, Australia
- Occupations: Head of Europe & Asia-Pacific
- Organization: National Football League
- Spouse: Elizabeth Gosper
- Children: 3
- Parent(s): Kevan Gosper, Jillian Mary Galwey (dec)

Brett Gosper (born 21 June 1959 in Melbourne, Australia) is Head of Europe & Asia-Pacific for the National Football League.

Gosper was previously CEO of World Rugby, a former advertising agency leader and a rugby union player.

== Early life ==
Gosper was educated at Scotch College, Melbourne and Monash University; Faculties of Law and Economics.

== Advertising career ==
In 1981, Gosper began his advertising career as a graduate trainee with Ogilvy (agency) in Melbourne and Brisbane, Australia. On being offered a place with the Racing Club rugby team in Paris he transferred to Ogilvy & Mather Paris in 1982, becoming Group Account Director in 1986.

In 1989 Gosper left Ogilvy to go on to become Deputy Managing Director of France's 3rd largest advertising agency BDDP Paris (now TBWA) in 1992. While at BDDP Gosper led a number of international account wins including TAG Heuer watches for whom he created the global concept of their longstanding worldwide campaign "Don't Crack Under Pressure". Gosper led the successful pitch for BMW in Germany in 1993 which led to him spending a year in Germany opening the BDDP Frankfurt office.

In 1994 Gosper was recruited by Havas to relaunch their struggling entities in London as chief executive officer of newly branded Euro RSCG Wnek Gosper. For almost a decade Gosper led the agency on an industry-acclaimed run of new business acquisition that included Abbey National, Argos, Bass Brewery, Cadbury, Coca-Cola's Atlanta roster, Commission for Racial Equality, Credit Suisse, Evian, Häagen-Dazs, Intel, Microsoft, Philips (Gosper was the author of the worldwide brand concept "Let's Make Things Better"), Reckitt Benckiser and The Independent.

The rise of Euro RSCG Wnek Gosper to number one in the Campaign Magazine's Business Performance League ensured the agency a Top 10 London agency ranking and several years as finalist in Ad Age's International Agency of the Year.

In 2003, Gosper sold his equity in Euro RSCG Wnek Gosper to join McCann (company), the world's largest advertising agency network, as CEO of their flagship New York office.

In 2004, Gosper briefly rejoined TBWA as President of TBWA New York Group (TBWA\Chiat\Day New York, Tequila New York, and Brand Architecture International). Gosper led the successful pitch for the newly merged Sprint-Nextel business. With billings of $800 million, it was the most significant marketing services account review that year in the USA.

In 2005, still based in New York, Gosper returned to McCann (company) as President of McCann USA. During the time of Gosper's leadership at McCann, the agency's flurry of new business wins included Goodyear, Staples, Smith Barney, Verizon, US Army, Viagra, Lunesta, Weight Watchers, USA Today.

From 2007–2011, Gosper returned to London as chief executive officer of McCann Europe, Middle East and Africa. Gosper was also a member of the McCann Worldwide Executive Board, and Board Executive responsible for major European-based global accounts including L'Oreal, Nestle, Unilever, Sony Ericsson, InterContinental Hotels Group.

In 2009, Gosper led McCann’s successful pitch against finalist WPP plc as exclusive marketing services provider to the London 2012 Olympic Games. Of note was McCann’s rebranding of volunteers as ‘Games Makers’, which saw 240,000 applications become 70,000 Games Makers.

== Sports executive career ==
=== CEO World Rugby and Rugby World Cup (2012-2021) ===
In July 2012, Gosper was appointed chief executive of the International Rugby Board, based in Dublin. The IRB has since changed its name to World Rugby.

As CEO, Gosper has overseen rugby's return to the Olympic Games (after 92 years absence) in Rio in 2016 as well as a record-breaking Rugby World Cup in England in 2015. With 2.47 million tickets sold and commercial and ticketing revenues in excess of £600 million, the 2015 Rugby World Cup generated over £260 million in total surplus to World Rugby for reinvestment in the global game.

Further record-breaking success was achieved in 2019 at Asia's first-ever Rugby World Cup in Japan; commercial revenues, broadcast audiences (including a domestic record rugby of 54.8 million for Japan v Scotland) and social media metrics (2.1 billion video views) at 2019 Rugby World Cup all exceeded those of the 2015 tournament .

Gosper also led the repositioning and rebranding of the International Rugby Board to its current name, World Rugby.

=== Head of Europe & Asia-Pacific National Football League (since 2021) ===
Gosper left World Rugby to join the National Football League, January 2021, in the newly created role; Head of NFL Europe.

In 2023 the NFL broadened Gosper’s European remit to include the Asia-Pacific region.

The National Football League is the world’s most valuable sports entertainment property and the most watched in the United States.

Based in London, his role is to accelerate the growth of the NFL fan base and revenues across European markets with strategic and operational responsibility involving all aspects of fan acquisition; broadcast, consumer products as well as ticketing, hospitality, and sponsorship generated by regular-season NFL games played in the regions.

In 2022, Gosper led the process to assign regular-season NFL games in Germany for the first time. Munich and Frankfurt were chosen as host cities for four years 2022-25. This coincided with the appointment of the NFL’s first managing director for the German market and the opening of an NFL German office.

In 2023, Gosper was a member of the NFL leadership team that partnered with International Federation of American Football to successfully secure a historic place for Flag Football as an additional sport at the LA 2028 Summer Olympics.

In 2025, a record number of six regular season NFL games were played in Europe, including three in London, and first-time games in Berlin, Dublin, and Madrid, where a new local NFL office was set up. Marking continued expansion of the NFL’s international footprint, a multi-year deal to play regular season games from 2026 in Australia at Melbourne’s MCG was also announced. This followed the setting up of an NFL office and an NFL Academy on Australia’s Gold Coast.

In April 2026, Gosper, alongside NFL Commissioner Roger Goodell, traveled to the Gold Coast, Australia, to formalize a strategic partnership with the International Federation of American Football (IFAF) and American Football Australia (AFA). The initiative, announced at CBus Super Stadium during a gathering of the Brisbane 2032 Governing Board, launched a nationwide program to integrate flag football into Australian schools ahead of the sport's Olympic debut at LA 2028.

=== Advisory and governance roles ===
In 2023, Gosper was appointed as an expert panelist on the UK Government’s Review of Women’s Football, Chaired by Karen Carney.

In 2023, Gosper was also appointed as the independent member of the ATP’s (Association of Tennis Professionals) newly formed Tournament Standards Committee.

== Rugby career ==
=== Early club career in Australia ===
Gosper began his first-grade rugby career in 1978 with the Melbourne Rugby Union Football Club. In 1979 at the age of 20, Gosper was named captain and first represented Victoria state. In 1980, he represented Victoria against the New Zealand All Blacks.

Gosper relocated to Brisbane in 1981 to join GPS club and the Queensland Rugby Union squad.

=== Racing Club de France (1981–1990) ===
Gosper left Australia aged 22 when recruited by one of France's most celebrated rugby clubs, Racing Club de France (now Racing 92) in Paris, where he played from 1981 to 1990. The team was also famous at the time for provocatively wearing pink bow ties in the 1987 and 1990 finals of the French Championship. This was notably the story that launched French clothing brand Eden Park in 1987.

=== International career ===
Gosper played trials for the Australia national rugby union team tours in 1979 (Argentina) and 1981 (United Kingdom). He was selected for the Australian Under 21 Rugby Union team in 1980, versus New Zealand at the Sydney Cricket Ground.

Gosper represented a French selection ("Séléction du Manoir") against British Barbarian F.C. in 1982 at the Parc des Princes.

Gosper was selected by the French Barbarian Rugby Club to play against the touring New Zealand All Blacks at La Rochelle in 1986. Gosper was captain/coach of the Italian side at the Monaco International Sevens in 1986 at the Stade Louis II.

=== Rugby honours ===
- Racing Club de France (Racing 92): Best Club Player, 1987.
- Melbourne Rugby Union Football Club: Best Club Player, 1978–1979–1980.

== Personal life ==
Gosper is the son of former International Olympic Committee Vice-President, Kevan Gosper AO and brother of Dean Gosper, a successful entrepreneur and member of the Executive Board of the International Ski and Snowboard Federation.

Residing in London, he is married with three children.
