= Stéphane Weller =

French rugby union player

- Born: 13 June 1966 (age 60) Juvisy-sur-Orge, France
- Height: 5 ft 11 in (180 cm)
- Weight: 172 lb (78 kg)

Rugby union career
- Position: Wing
International career
Years	Team	Apps	(Points)
1989–90	France	4	(0)

Stéphane Weller (born 13 June 1966) is a French former international rugby union player.

Born in Juvisy-sur-Orge, Weller was a winger and played his rugby for FC Grenoble.

Weller, uncapped on France's 1989 tour New Zealand, made his debut against the Wallabies at home later that year. He appeared twice against the Wallabies, including the 2nd Test win in Lille, then in 1990 was capped a third time against the same opponent in Sydney. His four and final France cap came against the touring 1990 All Blacks in Nantes.

== See also ==
- List of France national rugby union players
