= Michel Hondagné =

France international rugby union player

- Born: 10 March 1961 (age 65) Aflou, French Algeria
- Height: 5 ft 10 in (178 cm)
- Weight: 172 lb (78 kg)

Rugby union career
- Position: Scrum-half
International career
Years	Team	Apps	(Points)
1988	France	1	(0)

Michel Hondagné-Monge (born 10 March 1961) is a French former international rugby union player.

Born in Aflou, French Algeria, Hondagné was a scrum-half and played his rugby with Stadoceste Tarbais.

Hondagné won his solitary France cap during the 1988 tour of South America, as a second-half replacement for captain Pierre Berbizier in the 2nd Test against Argentine in Buenos Aires, which they lost 6–18.

== See also ==
- List of France national rugby union players
