= Dominique Bouet =

France international rugby union player

- Born: 31 March 1964 Sort-en-Chalosse, France
- Died: 2 July 1990 (aged 26) Nouméa, New Caledonia
- Height: 6 ft 2 in (188 cm)
- Weight: 236 lb (107 kg)

Rugby union career
- Position: Hooker
Senior career
Years	Team	Apps	(Points)
1986–90	US Dax		
International career
Years	Team	Apps	(Points)
1989–90	France	5	(0)

Dominique Bouet (31 March 1964 — 2 July 1990) was a French international rugby union player.

== Biography ==
A native of Landes, Bouet started playing rugby as a youth at AS Monfort and in 1984 transferred to US Dax, where he would spend his career. He made his senior debut for US Dax in the 1986–87 season.

Bouet won a France call up for the 1989 tour of New Zealand and featured in both Tests against the All Blacks. He was capped a further two times that year, in home internationals against the British Lions and Wallabies. In 1990, Bouet returned to the southern hemisphere for a tour of Australia and gained his fifth cap in the 3rd Test in Sydney.

On the way home from Australia, the French team stopped over in Nouméa for several days of rest. After a night of celebration, Bouet suffered cardiac arrest in his hotel room and was found dead on the floor by his teammates.

== See also ==
- List of France national rugby union players
