= Stadium Lille Métropole =

Stadium in Villeneuve-d'Ascq, France

Stadium Nord Lille Métropole
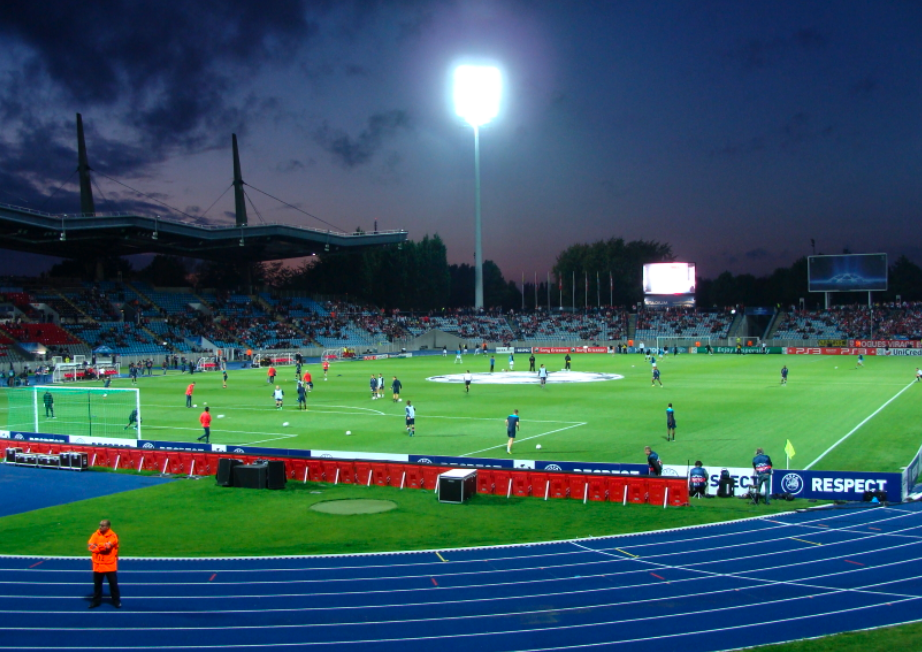
- Interactive map of Stadium Nord Lille Métropole
- Former names: Stadium Nord de Villeneuve d'Ascq (1975–2006)
- Location: Villeneuve-d'Ascq, France
- Coordinates: 50°37′52″N 3°08′15″E
- Capacity: 18,154
- Surface: Grass

Construction
- Built: 1975
- Opened: 25 June 1976
- Renovated: 2004
- Architect: Roger Taillibert

Tenants
- ES Wasquehal (1997–2005); Lille OSC (2004–2012); Lille OSC (women) (2015–present)

Stadium Lille-Métropole (French pronunciation: [stadjɔm lil metʁɔpɔl]) is a multi-purpose stadium in Villeneuve-d'Ascq, France. The stadium was built in 1976 and is able to hold 18,154 spectators. The architect of the stadium was Roger Taillibert.

The stadium was formerly known as the Vittel Stadium after French water brand Vittel.

It was used as the temporary home stadium of Lille OSC before the completion of the nearby Stade Pierre-Mauroy. It was also the home stadium of ES Wasquehal, when the club played in Ligue 2 and National, between 1995 and 2005.

The stadium has hosted several rugby matches, including France versus Argentina in 1988 and the Wallabies in 1989, All Blacks versus Canada in the 1991 Rugby World Cup quarter-finals, French Barbarians versus Springboks in 1992, Stade Français versus Scarlets in the 1998–99 Heineken Cup and the semi-final of the 2000-01 Heineken Cup between Stade Français and Munster.

In the 1980s and 1990s, the stadium underwent various extensions. The most ambitious project was that for Lille's bid for the 2004 Olympic Games where the stadium, taking advantage of its Olympic status, would have been temporarily enlarged to 65,000 seats. It was called Stadium Nord until 2006.

Also, the venue has an athletics track, which hosted the 2002 IPC Athletics World Championships and 2011 World Youth Championships in Athletics, as well as the annual Meeting Lille-Métropole.

Pink Floyd performed at the stadium during their A Momentary Lapse of Reason Tour on July 28, 1988.
