= Fergus Dunlea =

Irish rugby union player

- Full name: Fergus John Dunlea
- Born: 25 February 1964 (age 62) Dublin, Ireland
- School: Belvedere College
- University: Trinity College Dublin
- Occupation: Dentist

Rugby union career
- Position: Fullback
International career
Years	Team	Apps	(Points)
1989	Ireland	3	(4)

Fergus John Dunlea (born 25 February 1964) is an Irish former rugby union international.

Born in Dublin, Dunlea was educated at Belvedere College and is a dentist by profession.

Dunlea, a fullback, was capped three times for Ireland in the 1989 Five Nations Championship, debuting against Wales in Cardiff. He played for Dublin University, Lansdowne and Leinster during his career. His retirement from rugby was necessitated by a series of head knocks. One such instance occurred in a 1989 match for Leinster when he collided with All Blacks player Va'aiga Tuigamala and was left unconscious for 15 minutes.

== See also ==
- List of Ireland national rugby union players
