= Laurance Delaney =

- Born: 8 May 1956 (age 70) Llanelli, Wales

Rugby union career
- Position: Prop
International career
Years	Team	Apps	(Points)
1989–92	Wales	11	(0)

Laurance Delaney (born 8 May 1956) is a Welsh former rugby union international.

Delaney grew up in Llanelli and attended Stebonheath Secondary Modern School. He was a welder by profession.

A tight-head prop, Delaney earned 11 caps for Wales and featured in all three matches Wales played at the 1991 Rugby World Cup. He was a stalwart of his local side Llanelli RFC and celebrated his 500th club game in 1993.

== See also ==
- List of Wales national rugby union players
