= Ian Watkins (rugby union) =

Wales international rugby union player (born 1963)

- Born: Ian John Watkins; 10 March 1963 (age 63) Ebbw Vale, Wales
- School: Glyncoed Comprehensive; Ebbw Vale Senior Comprehensive

Rugby union career
- Position: Hooker
Amateur team(s)
| Years | Team | Apps | (Points) |
| 1981–1989 | Ebbw Vale RFC | | |
| 1989–1992 | Cardiff RFC | | |
| 1992–1993 | Swansea RFC | | |
| 1985–1990 | Barbarian F.C. | | |
International career
| Years | Team | Apps | (Points) |
| 1988–1989 | Wales | 10 | (4) |

Ian John Watkins (born 10 March 1963) is a former Wales international rugby union player whose senior position was at hooker. Watkins was capped ten times for Wales and played club rugby for Ebbw Vale RFC and Cardiff RFC. He also played invitational rugby for the Barbarians.

== Biography ==
Watkins was born in Ebbw Vale, Wales on 10 March 1963. He was educated at Glyncoed Comprehensive and Ebbw Vale Senior Comprehensive, where he played at scrum-half and centre. He began his club career with RTB Ebbw Vale Youth RFC where he swapped his position to hooker. Whilst still playing youth rugby he moved to Ebbw Vale RFC senior team. He was first selected for the Wales international team during the 1988 Five Nations Championship, coming on as a replacement. His first starting international came two weeks later when he faced Scotland at the National Stadium in Cardiff, in which Watkins scored his only international points with a try.

In total Watkins played ten internationals all between 1988 and 1989. After playing in all four games of the 1988 Championship, in which Wales won the Triple Crown, he was part of the Wales team that undertook a disastrous tour of New Zealand in the summer of that year. Watkins played in the first Test at Auckland, which New Zealand won 54-9. In December 1989 he was selected to face Romania on their tour of Great Britain. Wales lost 15-9. His final international games were all four games of the 1989 Five Nations Championship, Wales losing the first three opening games against Scotland, Ireland and France, before defeating England in the last encounter of the tournament. Troubled by injuries, Watkins found it difficult to challenge for the Wales hooker position later in his career.
