= Pierre Arthapignet =

France international rugby union player (born 1963)

- Full name: Pierre Harislur-Arthapignet
- Born: 2 April 1963 (age 63) Mauléon-Licharre, France
- Height: 6 ft 1 in (185 cm)
- Weight: 231 lb (105 kg)

Rugby union career
- Position: Hooker / No. 8
International career
Years	Team	Apps	(Points)
1988	France	1	(0)

Pierre Harislur-Arthapignet (born 2 April 1963) is a French former rugby union international.

Arthapignet hails from Mauléon-Licharre, a small Basque town that also produced France fly-half Roger Aguerre.

A Stadoceste Tarbais player, Arthapignet was capped once by France, substituting hooker Philippe Marocco in the eighth minute of a match against Argentina in Lille, which they won by 10-points.

Arthapignet was appointed to coach Paris-based club Racing 92 in 2004.

== See also ==
- List of France national rugby union players
