= John Fitzgerald (rugby union) =

Irish rugby union player

John Joseph Jude Fitzgerald (born 31 August 1961) is a former Irish rugby union international player who played as a prop forward.

Fitzgerald was born in London in 1961. He played for the Ireland team from 1988 to 1994, winning 12 caps. He was a member of the Ireland squad at the 1995 Rugby World Cup.
