= Phillip Matthews =

Irish former rugby union international, later college leader

- Born: Phillip Michael Matthews; 21 January 1960 (age 66) Gloucester, England
- School: Regent House Grammar School
- University: Queen's University Belfast
- Notable relative: Hannah Matthews (daughter)

Rugby union career
- Position: Flanker
Senior career
Years	Team	Apps	(Points)
1978–?	Queen's University		
?–1986	Ards		
1986–?	Wanderers		
Provincial / State sides
Years	Team	Apps	(Points)
- Ulster
International career
Years	Team	Apps	(Points)
1984–1992	Ireland	38	(16)
1989	British and Irish Lions	1	(0)
1985–1989	Barbarians	6	(16)

Phillip Michael Matthews (born 21 January 1960) is a former Ireland rugby union international. He was a member of the Ireland team that won the 1985 Five Nations Championship and the Triple Crown. He represented Ireland at the 1987 and 1991 Rugby World Cups. He also played for both the British and Irish Lions and the Barbarians. He captained both Ireland and the Barbarians. He subsequently served as a rugby union co-commentator with BBC Sport and TV3. Between 2010 and 2016 he served as the president of the National College of Ireland. His daughter, Hannah Matthews, is an Ireland women's field hockey international and played in the 2018 Women's Hockey World Cup final.

== Early years and education ==
Between 1970 and 1978 Matthews attended Regent House Grammar School. Between 1978 and 1986 Matthews attended Queen's University Belfast, where he gained a BSc and a PhD in zoology.

== Playing career ==
=== Clubs and province ===
Matthews played rugby union at senior club level for Queen's University, Ards and Wanderers. He also played for Ulster in the IRFU Interprovincial Championship. On 14 November 1984 Matthews, along with Nigel Carr, was a member of an Ulster team that defeated a touring Australia 15–13 at Ravenhill. Matthews and Carr were also teammates at Regent House Grammar School, Queen's University, Ards and Ireland.

=== Ireland ===
Between 1984 and 1992 Matthews made 38 full senior appearances for Ireland. On 10 November 1984 he made his senior international debut against Australia at Lansdowne Road. He was a member of the Ireland team that won the 1985 Five Nations Championship and the Triple Crown. He subsequently represented Ireland at the 1987 Rugby World Cup. On 29 October 1988 he captained Ireland for the first time against Western Samoa. He captained Ireland on 13 occasions, including at the 1991 Rugby World Cup when Ireland came extremely close to defeating eventual winners Australia in the quarter-final. He won his 38th and final cap on 2 February 1992 against Scotland at Lansdowne Road. Matthews international career has been commemorated on at least two postage stamps. He was the eighth Ireland rugby union international to appear on a stamp. Along with Steve Smith he was depicted on two stamps in a set of nine issued by Tajikistan for the 1991 Rugby World Cup. In his stamp he is seen tackling Australia's Michael Lynagh. He was also featured on one of the nine rugby union stamps issued by the Republic of Turkmenistan during 2000. Again he is playing against Australia at the 1991 Rugby World Cup.

	Appearances	Points
1984 Australia	1	
1985 Five Nations Championship	4	
1985 Japan	(2) ^{(Note 1)}	
1985 Fiji	(1) ^{(Note 1)}	
1986 Romania	1	
1987 Five Nations Championship	4	4 (Try)
1987 Rugby World Cup	3	
1988 Five Nations Championship	4	
1988 Millennium Trophy	1	
1988 Western Samoa	1	4 (Try)
1988 Italy	1	8 (2 Tries)
1989 Five Nations Championship	4	
1989 North America	(2) ^{(Note 1)}	
1989 New Zealand	1	
1990 Five Nations Championship	2	
1991 Five Nations Championship	4	
1991 Namibia	1	
1991 Rugby World Cup	3	
1992 Five Nations Championship	3	
Total	38	16

Notes

- ^1 The IRFU does not recognise matches played on these tours as full internationals. As a result, they are not included in final total of appearances.

=== British and Irish Lions ===
In 1989, Matthews played for the British and Irish Lions against France in a match to celebrate the Bicentennial of the French Revolution.

== Personal life ==
=== Family ===
Matthews is married to Lisa Flynn, the daughter of former Ireland rugby union international, Kevin Flynn. Their daughter, Hannah Matthews, is an Ireland women's field hockey international and played in the 2018 Women's Hockey World Cup final.

=== Employment ===
Between 1994 and 2015 Matthews served as a rugby union co-commentator with BBC Sport. He was encouraged to become a co-commentator by Jim Neilly. He has also worked for TV3, including at the 2007 Rugby World Cup. Away from rugby union, Matthews spent twenty years working in the pharmaceutical and consulting industries where he held various roles in sales, marketing, human resources and general management.

Between January 2007 and March 2010 he served as director of executive education at the Michael Smurfit Graduate Business School at University College Dublin. Between March 2010 and June 2016 he served as the President of the National College of Ireland.

== Honours ==
Ireland

- Five Nations Championship
  - Winners: 1985
- Triple Crown
  - Winners: 1985

Ulster

- IRFU Interprovincial Championship
  - Winners: ???
