= Bernard Lacombe (rugby union) =

France international rugby union & league player

- Born: 8 February 1963 (age 63) Rouen, France
- Height: 5 ft 10 in (178 cm)
- Weight: 172 lb (78 kg)

Rugby union career
- Position: Wing
International career
Years	Team	Apps	(Points)
1989–90	France	2	(4)
- Rugby league career

Playing information
Club
Years	Team	Pld	T	G	FG	P
1995–1998	Villeneuve

Bernard Lacombe (born 8 February 1963) is a French former rugby union and rugby league player.

== Biography ==
=== Rugby union ===
A product of US Foix, Lacombe started his senior rugby union career with SU Agen. He played mostly as a winger for SU Agen and was a member of the club's 1988 championship-winning team. During his time at SU Agen, Lacombe gained two France caps, debuting against the 1989 British Lions team at Parc des Princes. He was on the 1990 tour of Australia, where he played the 2nd Test against the Wallabies at Ballymore, scoring a try in a French loss.

=== Rugby league ===
Lacombe switched to rugby league in 1995, signing with Villeneuve. He was in the squad that won the 1995–96 French Rugby League Championship.

== See also ==
- List of France national rugby union players
