= Paul Rendall =

English rugby union player (1954–2023)

Paul Anthony George Rendall (18 February 1954 – 13 June 2023) was an English rugby union player. He played at loosehead prop. Nicknamed "the Judge", Rendall played for London Wasps.

Rendall earned 28 caps for England, from 1984, when he was already 30 years old, to 1991. He played in the Five Nations Championship for six seasons, in 1984, 1986, 1987, 1988, 1989 and 1990. He participated in the 1987 Rugby World Cup, winning three caps, and at the 1991 Rugby World Cup, playing in one game.

Rendall was diagnosed with motor neurone disease in 2022 and died on 13 June 2023, at the age of 69.
