= Philippe Marocco =

France international rugby union player & coach

Philippe Marocco (born 14 June 1960 in Cintegabelle) is a former French rugby union player and a current coach. He played as a prop and as a hooker.

Marocco made his career at Montferrand, winning the Challenge Yves du Manoir Cup in 1985/86 and finishing runner-up in the 1993/94 Championship.

He had 21 caps for France, from 1986 to 1991, scoring 1 try, 4 points in aggregate. He played four times at the Five Nations Championship, in 1986, 1989, 1990 and 1991. He won two titles, in 1986, ex-aequo with Scotland, and 1989. He was selected for the 1991 Rugby World Cup, playing four games but without scoring.

He has been the coach of A.S St.Junien Rugby, since 2011/12.
