= Marc Andrieu =

French rugby union player and coach

Marc Andrieu (born 19 September 1959, in Carmaux) is a former French rugby union player and coach. He played as a wing and as a centre.

== Club career ==
Andrieu first played for US Carmaux, since 1974/75, reaching the first team in 1977/78. He moved to AS Béziers in 1979/80, where he would stay until 1982/83. He won three titles of the Top 14, in 1979/80, 1980/81 and 1982/83. He was runners-up of the Challenge Yves du Manoir twice, in 1980 and 1981. He moved afterwards to RC Nîmes, where he played from 1983/84 to 1992/93, when he finished his career.

== International career ==
Andrieu had 26 caps for France from 1986 to 1990, scoring 6 tries, 24 points on aggregate. He played at the Five Nations Championship in 1988, 1989, and 1990. He won the tournament twice, in 1988, ex-aequo with Wales, and 1989.

He was called for the 1987 Rugby World Cup, playing in two games and scoring a try.

== Coach career ==
He became a coach at RC Nîmes after finishing his career there. He later became sports director.
