= Louis Armary =

France international rugby union player

Louis Armary, picture from Hautes-Pyrénées departmental council

Louis Armary (born Betpouey, 24 July 1963) is a former French, of Occitan descent rugby union footballer. He played as a prop and as a hooker.

== Club career ==
Armary spent most of his career at FC Lourdes, where he played from 1980/81 to 1999/00. He spent a final season at Union Sportive Argelès-Gazost, as player-coach, in 2000/01.

== International career ==
He won 46 caps with France, from 1986 to 1995, scoring a try. He played in three Rugby World Cup finals, in 1987, 1991 and 1995. He played a single game at the 1987 Rugby World Cup and at the 1991 Rugby World Cup, without scoring. He would play four games at the 1995 Rugby World Cup, once again remaining scoreless.

He played seven times in the Five Nations, in 1988, 1989, 1990, 1992, 1993, 1994 and 1995, winning the first time, ex-aequo with Wales.

== Post sports activity ==
In March 2015, he was elected, with Chantal Robin-Rodrigo, to the Hautes-Pyrénées departmental council, representing the Canton of La Vallée des Gaves.
