= Alain Lorieux =

France international rugby union player (born 1956)

- Born: 26 June 1956 (age 70) La Tronche, France
- Height: 1.96 m (6 ft 5 in)
- Weight: 109 kg (240 lb)

Rugby union career
- Position: Lock
Amateur team(s)
Years	Team	Apps	(Points)
1978-1985	FC Aix les Bains		
1985-1989	Grenoble		
1989-1990	RC Seyssens		
International career
Years	Team	Apps	(Points)
1981-1989	France	31	(12)

Alain Lorieux (born March 26, 1956) is a retired French international rugby union player. He played as a lock.

Lorieux played for FC Aix les Bains from 1978/79 to 1984/85, FC Grenoble from 1985/86 to 1988/89, and RC Seyssens in 1989/90.

Lorieux had 31 caps for France, from 1981 to 1989, scoring 3 tries, 12 points on aggregate. He earned his first cap on 5 July 1981 against Australia in a 17-15 loss at Brisbane. He played 5 times at the Five Nations Championship, in 1982, 1984, 1987, 1988 and 1989, being a winner in 1988, ex-aequo with Wales, and 1989. Lorieux was called for the 1987 Rugby World Cup, where France was runner-up to New Zealand. He played in 5 games, scoring 2 tries, 8 points on aggregate.
