= Marc Cécillon =

France international rugby union player (born 1959)

- Born: 30 July 1959 (age 67) Bourgoin-Jallieu
- Height: 1.91 m (6 ft 3 in)
- Weight: 115 kg (18 st 2 lb)

Rugby union career
- Position: Number 8
Amateur team(s)
Years	Team	Apps	(Points)
-1976	Saint-Savin		
1999-2003	Beaurepaire		
Senior career
Years	Team	Apps	(Points)
1976-1999	CS Bourgoin-Jallieu		
International career
Years	Team	Apps	(Points)
1988-1995	France	46	(38)

Marc Cécillon (born 30 July 1959) is a former French rugby union player and convicted murderer, who captained the national side on five occasions. He represented France from 1988 to 1995, with 46 test caps, including playing in the 1991 and 1995 World Cups. Cécillon, who played both number 8 and flanker, was known as the Quiet Man of French rugby.

In August 2004, Cécillon was arrested by French police for murdering his wife, whom he shot in front of 60 people at a party in Saint Savin (near to Bourgoin-Jallieu). A blood test showed that Cécillon was drunk. On 10 November 2006, Cécillon was found guilty of murdering his wife and sentenced to 20 years in prison, five more years than the prosecution had sought. The sentence was reduced to 14 years on appeal. The French media heavily followed the case.

He was freed on parole on 7 July 2011.

In September 2018 Cécillion was charged with "driving under the influence of alcohol, without a license and at excessive speed, violence against a person in a state of drunkenness and theft". He was sentenced to 12 months in prison, with six suspended, and fined 350 euros. The incident occurred after he was working at a vineyard and was drinking at a post-harvest evening event. Cécillon reportedly assaulted the vineyard's owner and some other workers who tried to intervene before getting in a vehicle and hitting a parked truck. At his trial Cécillon acknowledged that he was still struggling with alcohol.
