= Denis Charvet =

France international rugby union player

- Born: 12 May 1962 (age 64) Cahors, France
- Height: 1.80 m (5 ft 11 in)
- Weight: 79 kg (174 lb)

Rugby union career
- Position: Centre
Amateur team(s)
Years	Team	Apps	(Points)
1982-1990	Stade Toulousain		
1990-1996	Racing Club de France		
1996-1997	Stade Français		
International career
Years	Team	Apps	(Points)
1986-1991	France	23	(27)
1985-1997	Barbarian RC	13	(85)

Denis Charvet (born 12 May 1962 in Cahors) is a former French rugby union player. He played as a centre. Denis Charvet played for Stade Toulousain and Racing Club de France. He earned his first national cap on 1 March 1986 against Wales at Cardiff. He played all the five games at the 1987 Rugby World Cup, where France lost the final to New Zealand by 29-9.

== Honours ==
- Grand Slam : 1987
- French rugby champion, 1985, 1986, 1989 with Stade Toulousain
- Challenge Yves du Manoir1988 with Stade Toulousain
