= Alain Carminati =

France dual-code international rugby union & league player

- Born: 17 August 1966 (age 60) Champagnole, Jura, Bourgogne-Franche-Comté, France
- Height: 1.95 m (6 ft 5 in)
- Weight: 115 kg (18 st 2 lb)

Rugby union career
- Position: Flanker/Number 8
Senior career
Years	Team	Apps	(Points)
1981–1988	AS Béziers		
1988–1991	Castres		
1991–1994	CA Brive		
1994–1996	AS Béziers		
1996–1998	RC Narbonne		
International career
Years	Team	Apps	(Points)
1986–1995	France	20	(12)
- Rugby league career

Playing information
Club
Years	Team	Pld	T	G	FG	P
1988–1991	XIII Catalan
Representative
Years	Team	Pld	T	G	FG	P
	France	20				12

Alain Carminati (born 17 August 1966 in Champagnole, France) is a French former international rugby union and rugby league footballer. He played as a Flanker and Number 8.

He earned his first cap with the French national team on 23 October 1986 against Romania at Bucharest. He was called for the 1987 Rugby World Cup, where France was runners-up to New Zealand.

== Honours ==
- French Champions: 1993 with Castres
- French Cup: 1986 with AS Béziers
- Coupe Latine: 1995
- Five Nations Championship: 1988 and 1989
