= Éric Champ =

France international rugby union player

Éric Champ (born 8 June 1962) is a French former rugby union player. He played as a flanker and as a number eight.

Champ played all his career at RC Toulonnais, from 1979/80 to 1993/94. He won two French Championships, in 1986/87 and 1991/92. He had to leave competition after a serious injury.

He had 42 caps for France, from 1985 to 1991, scoring 3 tries, 12 points in aggregate. He played all five games at the 1987 Rugby World Cup, when France lost in the final to New Zealand by 29–9. He returned for the 1991 Rugby World Cup, playing four games.

Champ played five times at the Five Nations Championship, from 1986 to 1990, being a winner in 1987, 1988 (shared with Wales) and 1989.

After finishing his playing career, Champ was president of RC Toulounnais. He also has been a rugby commentator for French television.
