= Jean-Pierre Garuet-Lempirou =

French rugby union player (born 1953)

Jean-Pierre Garuet
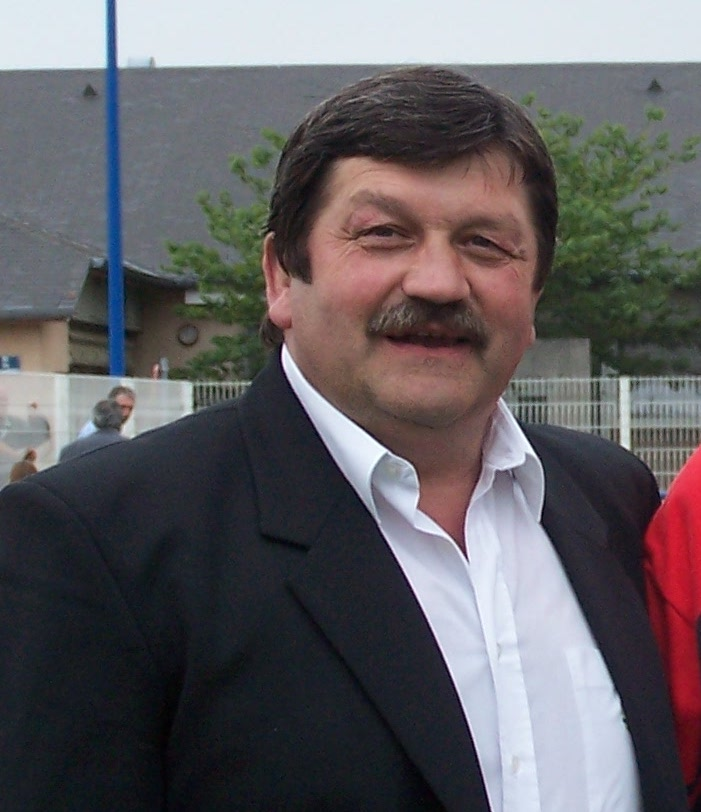
- Born: Jean-Pierre Garuet-Lempirou; 15 June 1953 (age 73) Lourdes, France
- Height: 1.77 m (5 ft 9 1/2 in)
- Weight: 105 kg (231 lb)

Rugby union career
- Position: Prop
Amateur team(s)
| Years | Team | Apps | (Points) |
| 1974–1991 | FC Lourdes | | |
International career
| Years | Team | Apps | (Points) |
| 1983–1990 | France | 42 | (0) |

Jean-Pierre Garuet-Lempirou (born 15 June 1953) is a former French rugby union international who played at tighthead prop. His club side was Lourdes.

He earned his first cap for France on 13 November 1983 against Australia at Clermont-Ferrand and established himself as a worthy successor to Robert Paparemborde.

In Paris on 21 January 1984, Garuet became the first Frenchman to be sent off in an international. He was expelled by referee Clive Norling for gouging the eye of Irish flanker John O'Driscoll, but later denied any wrongdoing.

Garuet was called for the 1987 Rugby World Cup, in which France finished runners-up.
