= Dominique Erbani =

French rugby union player

Dominique Erbani (born August 16, 1956) is a retired French international rugby union player. He played as a back-row forward.

He won 46 caps for France between 1981 and 1990, scoring 3 tries. He played in the 1987 Rugby World Cup Final defeat against New Zealand.
