= Jean Condom =

France international rugby union player (born 1960)

- Born: 15 August 1960 (age 66) Saint-André-de-Seignanx
- Height: 1.97 m (6 ft 5 1/2 in)
- Weight: 117 kg (18 st 6 lb)

Rugby union career
- Position: Lock
Senior career
Years	Team	Apps	(Points)
1980–1986	Boucau	116	(8)
1986–1996	Biarritz		
1996–1997	Bayonne		
International career
Years	Team	Apps	(Points)
1982–1990	France	61	(0)
1983-1994	Barbarian RC	6	

Jean Condom (born 15 August 1960 in Saint-André-de-Seignanx) is a retired French international rugby union player. He played as a lock.

He played for Boucau, from 1980/81 to 1985/86, for Biarritz Olympique, from 1986/87 to 1995/96. His final team was Aviron Bayonnais in 1996/97.

He had 61 caps for France, from 1982 to 1990, without ever scoring. He earned his first cap on 31 October 1982 against Romania at Bucharest in 13–9 loss. He was called for the 1987 Rugby World Cup, playing in five games, including the final where France was runners-up to New Zealand.

He played in eight editions of the Five Nations Championship, from 1983 to 1990, being a winner in 1983, 1986, 1987, 1988 and 1989.

He had his last cap at the 29-18 win over Australia, on 30 June 1990, in a tour.
