= Daniel Dubroca =

French rugby union player (born 1954)

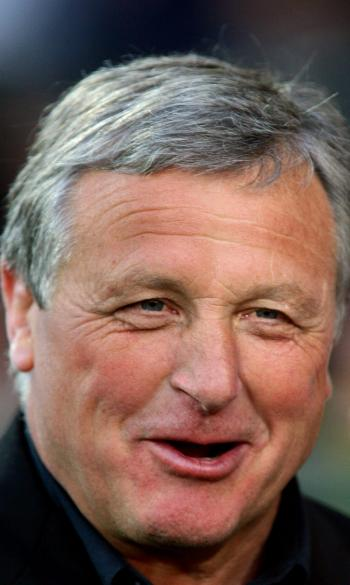
- Born: 25 April 1954 (age 72) Aiguillon, France
- Height: 1.78 m (5 ft 10 in)
- Weight: 95 kg (209 lb)

Rugby union career
- Position: Hooker / Prop
Amateur team(s)
| Years | Team | Apps | (Points) |
- Agen
International career
| Years | Team | Apps | (Points) |
| 1979–1988 | France | 33 | (8) |
Coaching career
- Years: Team
- 1990–1991: France
- 1994–1997: Agen

Daniel Dubroca (born 25 April 1954) is a former French national rugby union player and coach. He played as a prop and as a hooker.

== Biography ==
Dubroca was born at Aiguillon.

He played all his career at SU Agen, starting at 1969/70. He was promoted to the first category in 1972/73 and would play until 1989/90. He won three times the French Championship, in 1975/76, 1981/82 and 1987/88. He would be president of SU Agen from 2004 to 2008.

Dubroca had 33 caps for France, from 1979 to 1988, scoring 2 tries, 8 points in aggregate. He captained the French team at the 1987 World Cup, playing all the five matches and scoring a try. He played at the Five Nations Championship in 1982, 1984, 1987 and 1988, being winner the last time, with Wales in points equality.

Dubroca took over as national team coach in 1990 following Jacques Fouroux's resignation. In the 1991 Rugby World Cup, France cruised through opening round before being beaten 19-10 by England in the quarterfinals. After the final whistle Daniel Dubroca manhandled referee Dave Bishop accusing him of being a cheat. Dubroca later resigned and was replaced by Pierre Berbizier.

Sporting positions
| Preceded by (France) Jacques Fouroux | French National Rugby Union Coach; 1990 – 1991 | Succeeded by (France) Pierre Berbizier |
