= Pascal Ondarts =

France international rugby union player (born 1956)

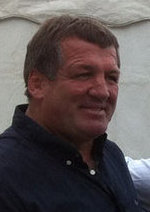
- Ondarts in 2014
- Born: 1 April 1956 (age 70) Méharin, France
- Height: 1.78 m (5 ft 10 in)
- Weight: 101 kg (223 lb)

Rugby union career
- Position: Prop
Amateur team(s)
| Years | Team | Apps | (Points) |
| 1977–1993 | Biarritz | | |
International career
| Years | Team | Apps | (Points) |
| 1986–1991 | France | 42 | (4) |

Pascal Ondarts (born 1 April 1956) is a French former rugby union player. He played as a prop and as a hooker. He was considered by The Times one of the 10 most frightening French players ever to represent his National Team.

Ondarts played all his career at Biarritz Olympique, from 1976/77 to 1992/93. He was runners-up to the French Championship in 1991/92.

He had 42 caps for France, scoring 1 try, 4 points in aggregate, from a 16-3 win over New Zealand, at 15 November 1986, in Nantes, in a friendly. It should be noticed that he was already 30 years old when he made his debut for his National Team. He participated in 5 editions of the Five Nations Championship, in 1987, 1988, 1989, 1990 and 1991, being a winner in 1987, with a Grand Slam, 1988, ex-aequo with Wales, and 1989. He played at the 1987 Rugby World Cup, where France lost the final to New Zealand by 29-9, but missed the final, and at the 1991 Rugby World Cup, where he had his last game for his National Team, at 19 October 1991, in the 10-19 loss to England, at the quarter-finals, aged 35 years old.

After ending his player career, he opened a restaurant in his hometown of Biarritz.

English prop Jason Leonard said that "Pascal Ondarts was the best, the toughest and hardest prop against I ever played".
