= Jean-Baptiste Lafond =

French rugby union player (born 1961)

- Born: 29 December 1961 (age 64) Bègles, France
- Height: 1.80 m (5 ft 11 in)
- Weight: 82 kg (181 lb)

Rugby union career
- Position: Wing
Senior career
Years	Team	Apps	(Points)
1980–1992	Racing Club de France		
1992–1993	Bordeaux-Bègles		
1995–1996	Stade Français		
1996–1997	RC Narbonne		
International career
Years	Team	Apps	(Points)
1983–1993	France	37	(101)

Jean-Baptiste Lafond (born 29 December 1961) is a former French rugby union footballer. He played for the French national team on over 30 occasions. His usual position was either on the wing or at fullback.

He made his debut for France against Australia in 1983 in Clermont Ferrand, which ended in a 15-all draw. He played in numerous Five Nations Championships, and was a part of the French squad at the 1991 Rugby World Cup.

At club level he played for teams including Paris clubs Racing Club de France and Stade Français. His club honours include winning the French championship in 1990 and was runner-up in 1987. His final cap for France was in Paris in 1993, with France defeating Wales. He was also selected for the English invitational side the Barbarian F.C.
