= Philippe Bérot =

French rugby union footballer and coach

Philippe Bérot (French: [filip beʁo]; born 29 January 1965 in Tarbes) is a former French rugby union player and a current coach. He played as a fullback and as a wing.

== Club career ==
Bérot first youth team was Lannemezan, from 1980/81 to 1982/83, moving to SU Agen in 1983/84, where he would play until 1991/92. He won the French Championship in 1987/88, was runners-up in 1983/84, 1985/86 and 1989/90, and won the Cup of France in 1991/92. He moved afterwards to FC Auch Gers, where he played from 1992/93 to 1999/2000. He finished his player career aged 35 years old.

== International career ==
He had 19 caps for France, from 1986 to 1989, still scoring 3 tries, 24 conversions and 33 penalties, 159 points on aggregate. He played and was a three times winner at the Five Nations Championship, in 1987, with a Grand Slam, being the top scorer, with 37 points, in 1988, ex-aequo with Wales, and in 1989, once again with a Grand Slam. He scored an aggregate of 1 try, 7 conversions and 13 penalties, 57 points, in the three presences at the competition. Despite this, he wasn't called for the 1987 Rugby World Cup.

== Coach career ==
Bérot started a coach career, after ending his player career, being in charge of FC Auch, from 2000/01 to 2001/02, of the centres of Castres Olympique, from 2002/03 to 2005/06, Stade Montois, in 2006/07, and Tarbes Pyrénées Rugby, from February 2008 to 2011/12.

On 19 May 2012, he became an assistant coach for the Italian national side, coaching the backs and working the defence, under head coach Jacques Brunel.
