= Franck Mesnel =

France international rugby union player (born 1961)

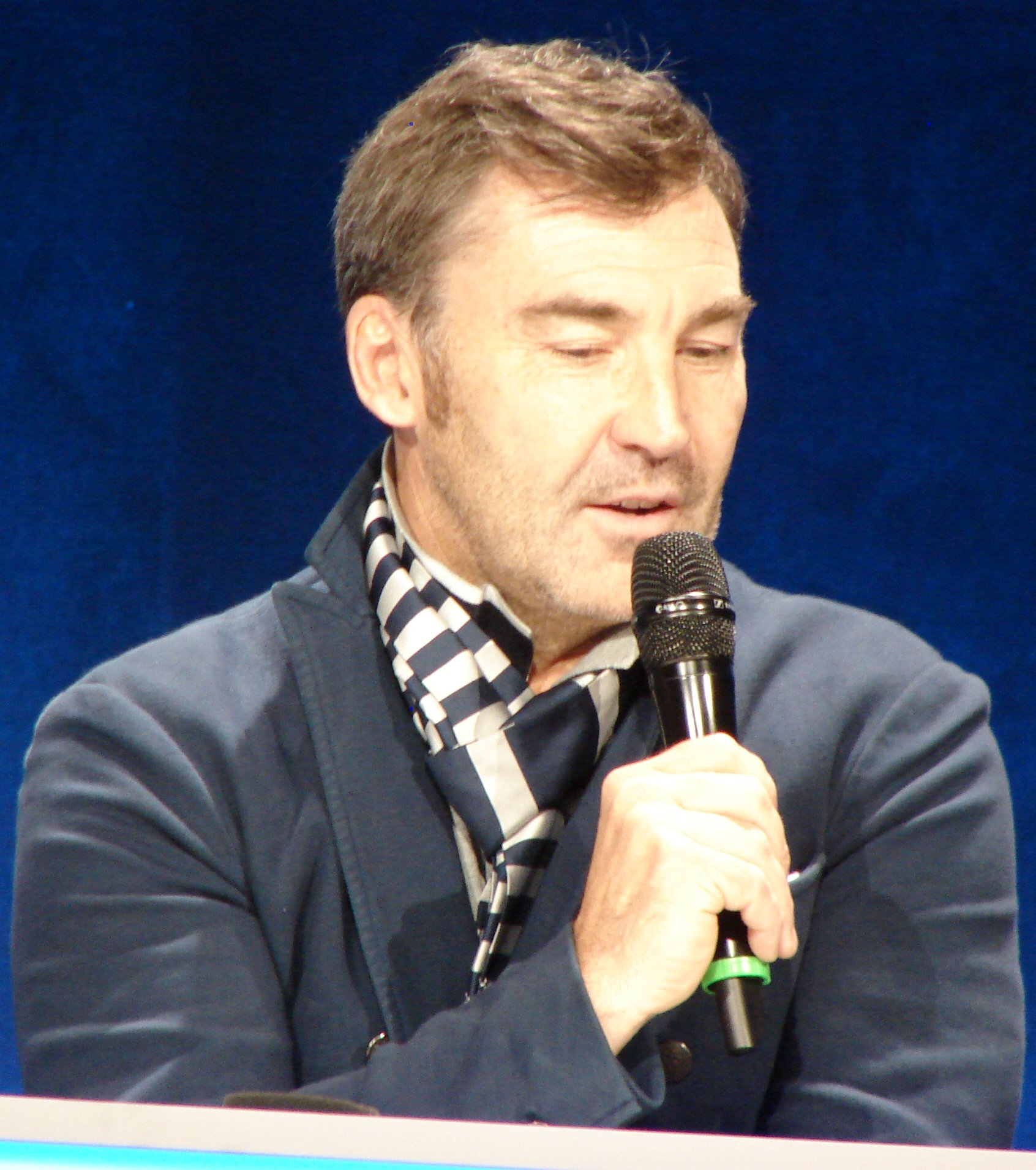
- Born: 30 June 1961 (age 65) Neuilly-sur-Seine, France
- Height: 1.81 m (5 ft 11 in)
- Weight: 91 kg (14 st 5 lb; 201 lb)

Rugby union career
- Position: Fly-half
Amateur team(s)
Years	Team	Apps	(Points)
1980-1986	Saint-Germain-en-Laye		
1986-1995	Racing Club de France		
Senior career
Years	Team	Apps	(Points)
1995-1997	Racing Club de France		
International career
Years	Team	Apps	(Points)
1986-1995	France	56	(41)

Franck Mesnel (born 30 June 1961) is a former French rugby union footballer. He played as a fly-half and as a centre. He is the founder of the French rugby and leisure clothing brand Eden Park.

The company was founded in 1987 and is named after the stadium in New Zealand where that year France lost the first rugby union World Cup final.

== Club career ==
Mesnel played for Saint-Germain-en-Laye (1980/81-1985/86) and for Racing Club de France (1986/87-1996/97). He won the title of the French Top 14, in 1989/90, and finished second in 1986/87.

== International career ==
He had 56 caps for France, from 1986 to 1995, scoring eight tries and three drop goals, 41 points in aggregate. He won the Five Nations four times, first with a Grand Slam, in 1987, then in 1988, tied with Wales, 1989 and 1993. Mesnel also played in three Rugby World Cup finals, in 1987, being vice-champion, 1991 and 1995, always without scoring. He also played for the English invitational team, the Barbarian F.C., alongside fellow French international Jean-Baptiste Lafond.

After ending his player career, he became a sports commentator.
