= Pierre Berbizier =

France international rugby union player (born 1958)

- Born: Pierre Berbizier; 17 June 1958 (age 68) Saint-Gaudens, France
- Height: 1.69 m (5 ft 7 in)
- Weight: 68 kg (10 st 10 lb)

Rugby union career
- Position: Scrum-half
Amateur team(s)
Years	Team	Apps	(Points)
????-1976	CA Lannemezanais		
1976–1985	FC Lourdes		
1985–1991	SU Agen		
International career
Years	Team	Apps	(Points)
1981–1991	France	56	(28)
1989-1990	French Barbarians	2	(0)
1989	World XV	1	(0)
Coaching career
- Years: Team
- 1991–1995: France
- 1998–2001: RC Narbonne
- 2005–2007: Italy
- 2007–2012: Racing Métro 92

Pierre Berbizier (born 17 June 1958) is a French former rugby union footballer and a current coach. His usual position was at scrum-half. He played 56 times for France.

== Biography ==
Berbizier was born in Saint-Gaudens. He made his international debut for France as a 22-year-old on 17 January 1981 in a test during the Five Nations against Scotland in Paris, which France won 16 points to nine. He played in the remaining Five Nations matches that season; earning caps against Ireland, Wales and England. He was capped twice more after the Five Nations that year, in two matches against the All Blacks, which France lost.

He was capped twice the following year; once during the Five Nations against Ireland in Paris, which France won 22 points to nine, and then against Romania in Bucharest, which France lost. He played in two Five Nations matches in 1983, and one the following year. Appearing just once in the 1984 Five Nations, he was then capped twice against the All Blacks in Christchurch and Auckland, both of which the All Blacks won. He played twice for France in 1985; in a two test series against Argentina.

After appearing for France on various occasions throughout the early 1980s, he was capped 11 times during the 1986 season; including all the Five Nations matches, as well as three games against the All Blacks. The following season he led France to a grand slam victory at the 1987 Five Nations. 1987 was also the year of the first-ever Rugby World Cup, in which France were invited to compete, as they were an IRFB member. France played Scotland in the first World Cup match, drawing 20-all in Christchurch. He led them to subsequent victories over Romania and Fiji, which saw them enter the finals, defeating the Wallabies in a classic semifinal encounter 30–24 to enter the first World Cup final. They went down to hosts, the All Blacks, 29–9 at Eden Park. His last cap for France was at Twickenham on 16 March 1991. In 1992 he became the head coach of France, and led them to the semi-finals at the 1995 Rugby World Cup. He was sacked after falling out with French Federation president Bernard Lapasset.

He played twice for the French Barbarians once in 1989 against Fiji and New Zealand in 1990. In 1989 he represented the World XV in a 20–19 loss against the Springboks.

He went on to coach at Narbonne, and since worked as a television pundit. Berbizier took over from John Kirwan to coach Italy. Under Berbizier, Italy for the first time won two matches in a single Six Nations edition in 2007 when they defeated Scotland 37–17 at Murrayfield and Wales 23–20 at Stadio Flaminio in Rome. He resigned as national team coach following the 2007 Rugby World Cup to take up the head coaching position at Racing Métro.

Sporting positions
Preceded by (France) Daniel Dubroca	French national rugby union coach 1991–1995	Succeeded by (France) Jean-Claude Skrela
Preceded by (New Zealand) John Kirwan	Italy national rugby union coach 2005–2007	Succeeded by (South Africa) Nick Mallett
