= Laurent Rodriguez =

France international rugby union player (born 1960)

- Born: 25 June 1960 (age 66) Poitiers, France
- Height: 1.90 m (6 ft 3 in)
- Weight: 115 kg (18 st 2 lb; 254 lb)

Rugby union career
- Position: Number 8
Senior career
Years	Team	Apps	(Points)
1978-1986	Stade Montois		
1986–1987	montferrand		
1987–1996	US Dax		
International career
Years	Team	Apps	(Points)
1981–1990	France	56	(32)
Coaching career
- Years: Team
- 1997–2003: Biarritz Olympique
- 2004–2005: Section Paloise
- 2005-2006: CA Brive

Laurent Rodriguez (born 25 June 1960) is a retired French rugby player.

He made his international debut for France on 5 July 1981 in a test against Australia. Rodriguez was called for the 1987 Rugby World Cup, where France was runners-up to New Zealand.
