= Patrice Lagisquet =

French rugby union player and coach

- Born: 4 September 1962 (age 64) Arcachon, France
- Height: 1.83 m (6 ft 0 in)
- Weight: 79.8 kg (12 st 8 lb)

Rugby union career
- Position: Wing
Amateur team(s)
Years	Team	Apps	(Points)
1980–1982	CA Bègles		
1982–1992	Bayonne		
1992–1995	Biarritz		
Senior career
Years	Team	Apps	(Points)
1995–1997	Biarritz		
International career
Years	Team	Apps	(Points)
1983-1991	France	46	(80)
Coaching career
- Years: Team
- 1997–2008: Biarritz
- 2011–2012: Biarritz
- 2012–2015: France (Backs/Defence)
- 2019–2023: Portugal
- 2021–: Lusitanos XV

Patrice Lagisquet (born 4 September 1962) is a former French rugby union player and a current coach. He played as a wing. He was nicknamed "The Bayonne Express".

== Club career ==
Lagisquet was born in Arcachon. He first played at U.A. Gujan-Mestras, until moving to CA Bègles, where he played from 1980/81 to 1981/82. Then, he would represent Aviron Bayonnais, from 1982/83 to 1991/92, and Biarritz Olympique, from 1992/93 to 1996/97, where he would finish his career.

== International career ==
He made his international debut against Australia on 13 November 1983 at the Parc des Sports Marcel Michelin in Clermont-Ferrand. France leading 9–6 at half time eventually drew the game 15-15. His last international game was a Rugby World Cup Pool 4 qualifier against Romania on 4 October 1991 at the Stade de la Mediterranee in Béziers, that France won comfortably by 30–3.

He won a total of 46 caps for France, from 1983 to 1991, scoring 20 tries, 80 points in aggregate. He played at the 1987 Rugby World Cup, in five matches, and at the 1991 Rugby World Cup, in one match. He played 5 seasons at the Five Nations, in 1984, 1988, 1989, 1990 and 1991, being a winner in 1988, and 1989. He also represented France XV, establishing a national record of 7 tries scored in the 106–12 win over Paraguay, at 27 June 1988, in Asunción.

== Coach career ==
Lagisquet started a coaching career, after ending his playing days, becoming the coach of Biarritz Olympique, from 1997/98 to 2007/08. He won the title of Champion of France three times, in 2001/02, 2004/05 and 2005/06, the Cup of France, in 2000, and was runner-up in the Heineken Cup, in 2006.

He left his coaching position in 2008, to focus on his assurance work.

As of July 2011, Lagisquet was Biarritz Olympique as Director of Rugby, until 2012 when he joined the French national set-up as backs and defence coach,

He was assigned to be head coach of Portugal, in June 2019. He led Portugal to their second presence Rugby World Cup, after winning the Repechage. At the 2023 Rugby World Cup, their second presence in the competition, they drew with Georgia (18-18) and beat narrowly Fiji (24-23), for their best results ever.

Sporting positions
Preceded by (Portugal) Martim Aguiar	Portugal National Rugby Union Coach; 2019-2023	Succeeded by (France) Sébastien Bertrank
