= Jacques Fouroux =

French rugby union player and coach

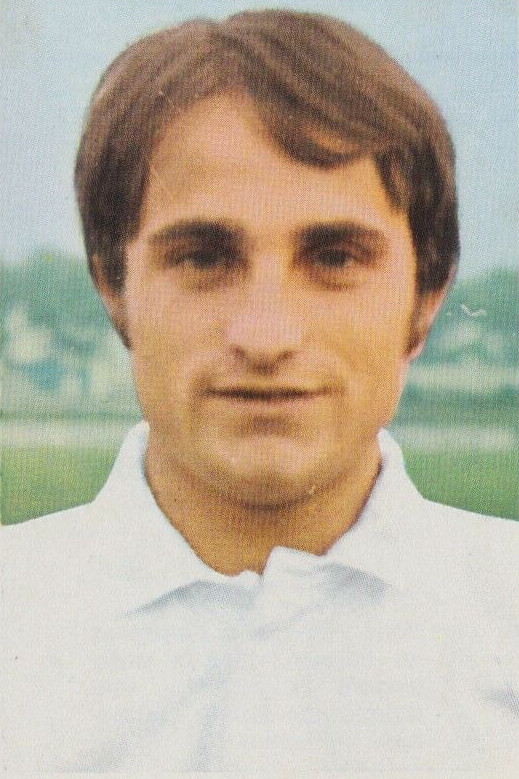
- Jacques Fouroux in 1971
- Born: 24 July 1947 Auch, France
- Died: 17 December 2005 (aged 58) Auch, France
- Height: 1.63 m (5 ft 4 in)
- Weight: 66 kg (146 lb)

Rugby union career
- Position: Scrum-half
Senior career
Years	Team	Apps	(Points)
1965–1970	US Cognac		
1970–1976	La Voulte		
1976–1980	Auch		
International career
Years	Team	Apps	(Points)
1972–1977	France	27	(20)
- Correct as of 19:01, 28 February 2010 (UTC)
Coaching career
- Years: Team
- 1981–1990: France
- 1992–1993: Grenoble
- 2000–2001: Orléans
- 2005: Grenoble
- 2005: L'Aquila

Jacques Fouroux (24 July 1947 – 17 December 2005) was a French rugby union player and coach. He captained France when they won the Grand Slam in 1977, and was the manager when the side repeated the feat in 1981 and 1987. Due to his small stature and strong personality, he was nicknamed "Le petit caporal" (lit. 'The Little Corporal'), a reference to Napoléon Bonaparte's nickname.

== Player ==
Fouroux, who played as a scrum half, played for his hometown team FC Auch, as a youngster and at the end of his career (1976–1980). He started as senior with US Cognac until 1970 and played for La Voulte until 1976. He made his international debut in 1972 although it took him another four years to become a regular starter, as he was in competition with another, more sober, scrum-half Richard Astre of Béziers. At 5 ft 3 ins tall, he was one of the smallest players ever to play international rugby. His size, combined with his supremely confident, almost arrogant, leadership style, meant that he was often compared with Napoleon Bonaparte; Bonaparte's nickname "the little Corporal" stuck with Fouroux throughout his career. He was particularly happy when the going got tough and was described as a "ninth forward".

Fouroux captained France during both the 1976 and the 1977 Five Nations Championship. The 1976 Championship went well for France, their only loss came against Wales. The French highlight of the tournament was a 30–9 victory over England. The following year, which was to prove to be Fouroux's final season as an international player, saw France take the Grand Slam. Aside from a 4–3 victory over England, in which England missed a number of kickable penalties, France won their second Grand Slam fairly convincingly. The same 15 players played the 4 games from beginning to end.

He also played for a World XV on 9 August 1980 against Argentina in Buenos Aires, losing 36–22.

== Coach ==
After retiring, having earned 27 international caps, 23 as captain, Fouroux became the coach of France shortly before the 1981 Five Nations tournament. Fouroux's appointment coincided with France's domination of the Five Nations; in the ten years that he managed the side, France won the Five Nations on six occasions. During the 1980s France's successes were based around their massive pack, a fact which upset a number of commentators in France who preferred a more technical approach.

=== Runners-up World Cup 1987 ===
France entered the inaugural Rugby World Cup as one of the favourites. The team progressed all the way to the final before losing 29–9 to the All Blacks.

Throughout his career as both a player and a coach, Fouroux was unafraid of making enemies and upsetting people. This finally caught up with him in 1990, when an embarrassing 12–6 defeat to Romania provided a perfect excuse for the Fédération Française de Rugby to give him the sack.

=== A French championship Title private following a refereeing error with Grenoble 1993 ===
Following this he became the coach of FC Grenoble (1992–1993), whom he took to the final of the French League in 1993 with a massive pack nicknamed the mammoths. Grenoble lost the match and Fouroux, who claimed that the game had been fixed, defected to rugby league. Despite overpowering pack Grenoble tilts on the score of 14–11. A try of Olivier Brouzet is denied to Grenoble and the decisive try by Gary Whetton was awarded by the referee, Daniel Salles, when in fact the defender Franck Hueber from Grenoble touched down the ball first in his try zone. This error gave the title to Castres. Salles admitted the error 13 years later. Fouroux conflict with the Federation and who was already suspicious before the match of the referee cry out conspiracy.

== Administrator ==
=== Rugby league ===
In 1995, Fouroux launched a new summer rugby league competition, simply called France Rugby League. This led to his appointment to the presidency of Paris Saint-Germain Rugby League, a team in Rupert Murdoch's new Super League, for which FRL was supposed to serve as a developmental circuit. The plan saw limited success however, and Fouroux successively left both organizations during the summer of 1996.

=== Rugby union ===
He promptly returned to rugby union with his hometown club FC Auch, which was facing a leadership crisis at the time, and became its president in October 1996. His last assignment was a brief coaching stint with Italian side L'Aquila, of which he was let go in November 2005, as his unorthodox style apparently did not gel well with the organization.

He died on 17 December 2005, aged 58, of a heart attack. In 2007, FC Auch Gers renamed their venue, formerly known as Stade du Moulias, in his honor.

Sporting positions
Preceded by (France) Jean Desclaux	French National Rugby Union Coach; 1981–1990	Succeeded by (France) Daniel Dubroca
