= Philippe Sella =

France international rugby union player (born 1962)

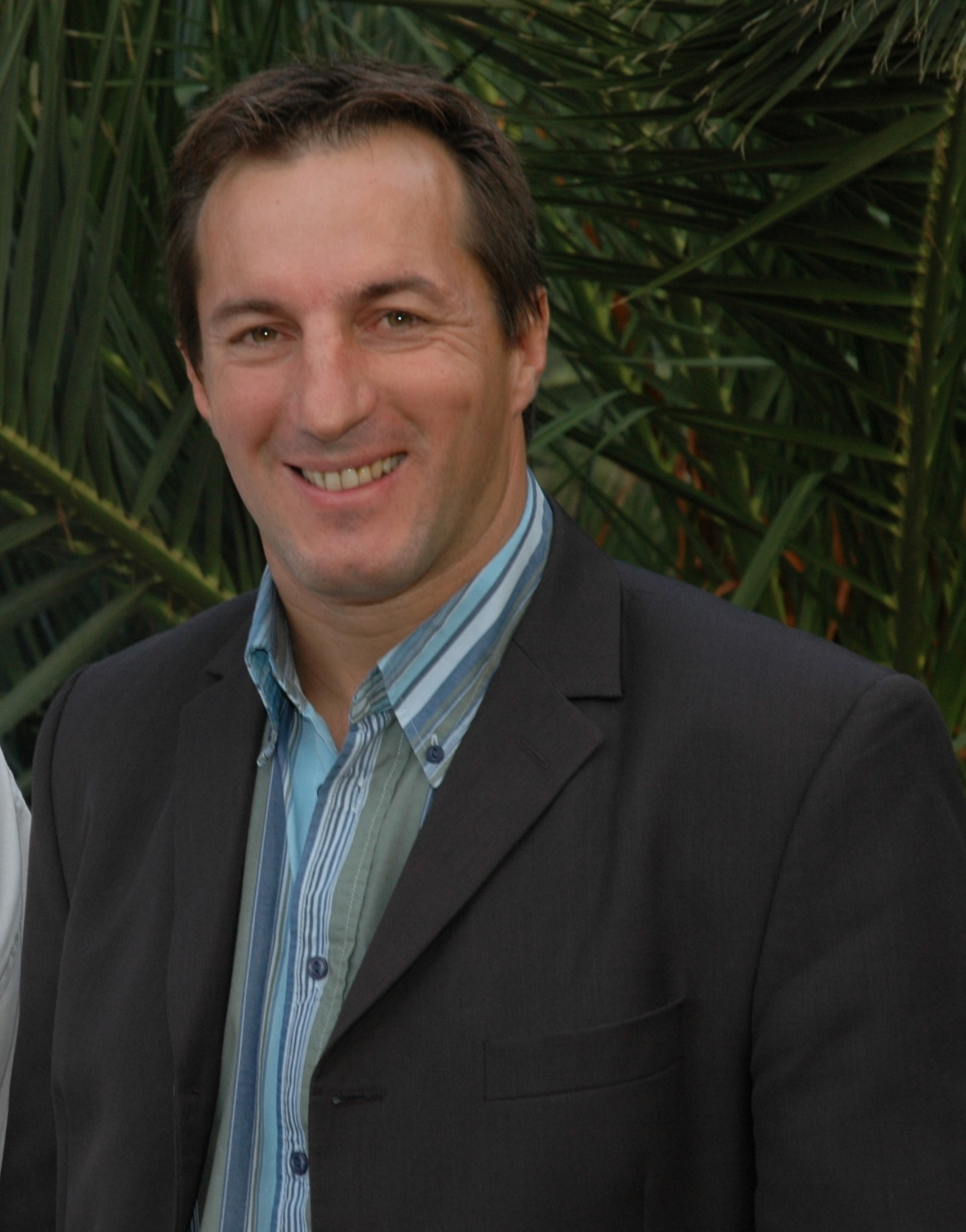
- Sella in 2007
- Born: 14 February 1962 (age 64) Tonneins, France
- Height: 1.80 m (5 ft 11 in)
- Weight: 84 kg (13 st 3 lb)
- Occupation(s): Physical Education teacher, then marketing businessman

Rugby union career
- Position: Centre
Amateur team(s)
Years	Team	Apps	(Points)
1982–1995	Agen		
Senior career
Years	Team	Apps	(Points)
1996–1998	Saracens	14	(10)
International career
Years	Team	Apps	(Points)
1982–1995	France	111	(128)

Philippe Sella (born 14 February 1962, in Tonneins) is a French former rugby union player. He started as a rugby league junior in his home town before switching to rugby union. As a former French rugby union player, he held the record for most international appearances until beaten by Jason Leonard. He became a member of the International Rugby Hall of Fame in 1999, and the IRB Hall of Fame in 2008.

Sella joined Saracens in 1996 from French side Agen. He and Australian Michael Lynagh were the catalysts for Saracens as they made the transition into the professional era, and Sella's presence helped other players make up their minds about joining the up-and-coming club.

He made a then world record 111 appearances (or caps) for France, and is one of only five players to have scored a try in every game during a Five Nations season.

During the 1998 season, Sella played in the Saracens midfield alongside Steve Ravenscroft. His experience, pace and vision contributed to the team's performance that year, supported by his stong defensive work rate.

He scored the opening try in the Tetley's Bitter Cup final in the same year, a trademark Sella finish. He showed pace, power and vision to run, swivel and crash over the line with his try then signaling the way for the floodgates to open.

He retired from rugby union later that year at the age of 36 and returned to France with his family.
