= 1990 Five Nations Championship squads =

Rugby union competition squads

This is a list of the complete squads for the 1991 Five Nations Championship, an annual rugby union tournament contested by the national rugby teams of England, France, Ireland, Scotland and Wales.

== England ==
Head coach: Geoff Cooke

1. Paul Ackford
2. Rob Andrew
3. Mark Bailey
4. Steve Bates
5. Alan Buzza
6. Will Carling (c.)
7. Fran Clough
8. Wade Dooley
9. David Egerton
10. Jerry Guscott
11. Simon Halliday
12. Richard Hill
13. Simon Hodgkinson
14. Mark Linnett
15. Brian Moore
16. John Olver
17. Jeff Probyn
18. Paul Rendall
19. Mickey Skinner
20. Mike Teague
21. Rory Underwood
22. Jon Webb
23. Peter Winterbottom

== France ==
Head coach: Jacques Fouroux

1. Marc Andrieu
2. Louis Armary
3. Pierre Berbizier (c.)*
4. Serge Blanco
5. Dominique Bouet
6. Didier Camberabero
7. Alain Carminati
8. Éric Champ
9. Denis Charvet
10. Jean Condom
11. Thierry Devergie
12. Dominique Erbani
13. Jean-Pierre Garuet-Lempirou
14. Fabrice Heyer
15. Peyo Hontas
16. Bernard Lacombe
17. Thierry Lacroix
18. Jean-Baptiste Lafond
19. Patrice Lagisquet
20. Jean-Marc Lhermet
21. Thierry Maset
22. Eric Melville
23. Franck Mesnel
24. Pascal Ondarts
25. Marc Pujolle
26. Laurent Rodriguez (c.)**
27. Olivier Roumat
28. Henri Sanz
29. Éric Sauboua
30. Philippe Sella
31. Frédéric Velo

(*) Captain in the first two games (**) Captain in the third and fourth games

== Ireland ==
Head coach: Ciaran Fitzgerald

1. Fergus Aherne
2. Willie Anderson (c.)*
3. Michael Bradley
4. Paul Collins
5. Keith Crossan
6. Phil Danaher
7. Des Fitzgerald
8. Neil Francis
9. Mick Galwey
10. Gary Halpin
11. Kenneth Hooks
12. David Irwin
13. Ralph Keyes
14. Michael Kiernan
15. Donal Lenihan (c.)**
16. Noel Mannion
17. Phillip Matthews
18. Denis McBride
19. John MacDonald
20. Brendan Mullin
21. Kenny Murphy
22. Pat Murray
23. Pat O'Hara
24. James O'Riordan
25. Nick Popplewell
26. Peter Russell
27. Brian Smith
28. Steve Smith

(*) Captain in the first two games (**) Captain in the third and fourth games

== Scotland ==
Head coach: Ian McGeechan

1. John Allan
2. Gary Armstrong
3. Alex Brewster
4. Paul Burnell
5. Finlay Calder
6. Craig Chalmers
7. Damian Cronin
8. Peter Dods
9. Chris Gray
10. Gavin Hastings
11. Scott Hastings
12. John Jeffrey
13. Sean Lineen
14. Graham Marshall
15. Kenny Milne
16. Greig Oliver
17. Craig Redpath
18. Graham Shiel
19. David Sole (c.)
20. Tony Stanger
21. Iwan Tukalo
22. Derek Turnbull
23. Alan Watt
24. Doddie Weir
25. Derek White
26. Douglas Wyllie

== Wales ==
Head coach: John Ryan/Ron Waldron

1. Andy Allen
2. Allan Bateman
3. Andy Booth
4. Chris Bridges
5. Tony Clement
6. Richie Collins
7. Carwyn Davies
8. Phil Davies
9. Laurance Delaney
10. Alan Edmunds
11. David Wyn Evans
12. Steve Ford
13. Mike Griffiths
14. Mike Hall
15. Garin Jenkins
16. Arthur Jones
17. Gary Jones
18. Mark Jones
19. Robert Jones (c.)
20. Gareth Llewellyn
21. Martyn Morris
22. Kevin Moseley
23. Mark Perego
24. Kevin Phillips
25. Rowland Phillips
26. Jeremy Pugh
27. Mark Ring
28. Paul Thorburn
29. Mark Titley
30. Ian Watkins
31. Brian Williams
32. Hugh Williams-Jones
