= 1991 Five Nations Championship squads =

Rugby union competition squads

This is a list of the complete squads for the 1991 Five Nations Championship, an annual rugby union tournament contested by the national rugby teams of England, France, Ireland, Scotland and Wales. Scotland were the defending champions.

== England ==
Head coach: Geoff Cooke

1. Jason Leonard
2. Brian Moore
3. Jeff Probyn
4. Paul Ackford
5. Wade Dooley
6. Mike Teague
7. Peter Winterbottom
8. Dean Richards
9. Richard Hill
10. Rob Andrew
11. Rory Underwood
12. Jerry Guscott
13. Will Carling (c.)
14. Nigel Heslop
15. Simon Hodgkinson

- England used the same 15 players in the four games

== France ==
Head coach: Daniel Dubroca

1. Abdelatif Benazzi
2. Pierre Berbizier
3. Serge Blanco (c.)
4. Xavier Blond
5. Laurent Cabannes
6. Didier Camberabero
7. Marc Cécillon
8. Denis Charvet
9. Christophe Deslandes
10. Jean-François Gourragne
11. Thierry Lacroix
12. Jean-Baptiste Lafond
13. Patrice Lagisquet
14. Grégoire Lascubé
15. Philippe Marocco
16. Pascal Ondarts
17. Olivier Roumat
18. Philippe Saint-André
19. Philippe Sella
20. Michel Tachdjian

== Ireland ==
Head coach: Ciaran Fitzgerald

1. Jack Clarke
2. Keith Crossan
3. David Curtis
4. Des Fitzgerald
5. John Fitzgerald
6. Neil Francis
7. Mick Galwey
8. Simon Geoghegan
9. Gordon Hamilton
10. Kenneth Hooks
11. Michael Kiernan
12. Phillip Matthews
13. Brendan Mullin
14. Kenny Murphy
15. Brian Rigney
16. Brian Robinson
17. Rob Saunders (c.)
18. Brian Smith
19. Steve Smith
20. Jim Staples

== Scotland ==
Head coach: Jim Telfer

1. John Allan
2. Gary Armstrong
3. Paul Burnell
4. Craig Chalmers
5. Damian Cronin
6. Chris Gray
7. Gavin Hastings
8. Scott Hastings
9. John Jeffrey
10. Sean Lineen
11. Kenny Milne
12. Alex Moore
13. David Sole (c.)
14. Tony Stanger
15. Derek Turnbull
16. Derek White

== Wales ==
Head coach: Ron Waldron

1. Paul Arnold
2. Chris Bridges
3. Alun Carter
4. Tony Clement
5. John Davies
6. Phil Davies
7. Ieuan Evans
8. Luc Evans
9. Steve Ford
10. Glen George
11. Scott Gibbs
12. Mike Griffiths
13. Neil Jenkins
14. Arthur Jones
15. Robert Jones
16. Paul Knight
17. Emyr Lewis
18. Gareth Llewellyn
19. Glyn Llewellyn
20. Martyn Morris
21. Paul Thorburn (c.)
22. Brian Williams
