= 1990 Wales rugby union tour of Namibia =

- Manager: Glyn Cook
- Coach: Ron Waldron
- Tour captain: Kevin Phillips
Summary
P	W	D	L
Total
6	6	0	0
Test match
2	2	0	0
Opponent
P	W	D	L
Namibia
2	2	0	0

Tour chronology
- ← 1988 New Zealand 1991 Australia →

The Wales national rugby union team toured Namibia for the first time in May and June 1990. They played six matches and won all six, including two tests against the Namibia national team.

== Matches ==
Date	Venue	Home	Score	Away
23 May 1990	Rossing Country Club Oasis, Swakopmund	Invitation XV	0–73	Welsh XV
26 May 1990	South West Stadium, Windhoek	Namibia B	18–35	Welsh XV
29 May 1990	South West Stadium, Windhoek	Central Region	6–43	Welsh XV
2 June 1990	South West Stadium, Windhoek	Namibia	9–18	Wales
5 June 1990	Tsumeb	Northern Region	9–67	Welsh XV
9 June 1990	South West Stadium, Windhoek	Namibia	30–34	Wales

=== Invitation XV vs Welsh XV ===
23 May 1990

Invitation XV	0–73	Welsh XV
		Try: Fealey (3); Ford (2); O. Williams (2); Gl. Llewellyn; R. Phillips; A. Williams; Bowling; Ring; Buckett; Con: Rayer (7); A. Williams (2); Pen: Rayer

Rossing Country Club Oasis, Swakopmund

=== Namibia B vs Welsh XV ===
26 May 1990

Namibia B	18–35	Welsh XV
Try: Swartz; Con: McCulley; Pen: McCulley (3); Drop: McCulley		Try: Parfitt (2); Emyr (2); Bateman; Con: Thorburn (3); Pen: Thorburn (3)

South West Stadium, Windhoek

=== Central Region vs Welsh XV ===
29 May 1990

Central Region	6–43	Welsh XV
Pen: Coetzee; Drop: Coetzee		Try: Parfitt; Morris; Ring; Emyr; Fealey; Reynolds; Con: Rayer (5); Pen: Rayer (3)

South West Stadium, Windhoek

=== Namibia vs Wales ===
2 June 1990

Namibia	9–18	Wales
Try: Mans; Con: McCulley; Pen: McCulley		Try: Thorburn; Bridges; Con: Thorburn (2); Pen: Thorburn (2)

South West Stadium, Windhoek
Referee: Fred Howard (England)

FB	15	Andre Stoop
RW	14	Gerhard Mans (c)
OC	13	Vince du Toit
IC	12	Johan Deysel
LW	11	Ben Swartz
FH	10	Shaun McCulley
SH	9	Basie Buitendag
N8	8	Theo Oosthuizen
OF	7	Alex Skinner
BF	6	Barries Barnard
RL	5	Arra van der Merwe
LL	4	Sarel Losper
TP	3	Manie Grobler
HK	2	Stephan Smith
LP	1	Cassie Derks
Coach:
unknown

FB	15	Paul Thorburn
RW	14	Steve Ford
OC	13	Mark Ring
IC	12	Allan Bateman
LW	11	Arthur Emyr	Substituted off
FH	10	Tony Clement
SH	9	Chris Bridges
N8	8	Mark Jones
OF	7	Martyn Morris
BF	6	Alan Reynolds
RL	5	Paul Arnold
LL	4	Glyn Llewellyn
TP	3	Paul Knight
HK	2	Kevin Phillips (c)
LP	1	Mike Griffiths
Replacements:
CE		Stuart Parfitt	Substituted in
Coach:
Ron Waldron

=== Northern Region vs Welsh XV ===
5 June 1990

Northern Region	9–67	Welsh XV
Try: Jeffrey; Con: Olivier; Pen: Olivier		Try: Rayer (2); A. Williams (2); Morris (2); Gregory; S. Williams; Pugh; Parfitt; O. Williams; Con: Rayer (7); Pen: Rayer (2); Drop: A. Williams

Tsumeb

=== Namibia vs Wales ===
9 June 1990

Namibia	30–34	Wales
Try: Swartz (2); Mans; Con: McCulley; Coetzee (2); Pen: McCulley (2); Coetzee; Drop: Coetzee		Try: Emyr (2); O. Williams; Penalty try Con: Thorburn (3); Pen: Thorburn (3); Drop: Clement

South West Stadium, Windhoek
Referee: Fred Howard (England)

FB	15	Jaco Coetzee
RW	14	Gerhard Mans (c)
OC	13	Vince du Toit
IC	12	Johan Deysel
LW	11	Ben Swartz
FH	10	Shaun McCulley
SH	9	Basie Buitendag
N8	8	Theo Oosthuizen
OF	7	Alex Skinner
BF	6	Barries Barnard	Substituted off
RL	5	Arra van der Merwe
LL	4	Sarel Losper
TP	3	Manie Grobler
HK	2	Stephan Smith
LP	1	Cassie Derks
Replacements:
N8		Jasper Coetzee	Substituted in
Coach:
unknown

FB	15	Paul Thorburn
RW	14	Steve Ford	Substituted off
OC	13	Mark Ring
IC	12	Allan Bateman
LW	11	Arthur Emyr
FH	10	Tony Clement
SH	9	Chris Bridges
N8	8	Mark Jones	Substituted off
OF	7	Martyn Morris
BF	6	Owain Williams
RL	5	Paul Arnold
LL	4	Glyn Llewellyn
TP	3	Paul Knight
HK	2	Kevin Phillips (c)
LP	1	Mike Griffiths
Replacements:
FH		Aled Williams	Substituted in
FL		Alan Reynolds	Substituted in
Coach:
Ron Waldron

== Squad ==
Name	Position	Club	Notes
Kevin Phillips	Hooker	Neath	Captain
Keiron Gregory	Hooker	Newport	
Steve Blackmore	Prop	Cardiff	Withdrew
Ian Buckett	Prop	Swansea	
Mike Griffiths	Prop	Cardiff	
Paul Knight	Prop	Pontypridd	
Jeremy Pugh	Prop	Neath	
Brian Williams	Prop	Neath	Withdrew
Hugh Williams-Jones	Prop	South Wales Police	Withdrew
Andy Allen	Lock	Newbridge	Withdrew
Paul Arnold	Lock	Swansea	
Andrew Kembery	Lock	Neath	Withdrew
Gareth Llewellyn	Lock	Neath	Withdrew
Glyn Llewellyn	Lock	Neath	
Steve Williams	Lock	Swansea	
Mark Jones	Back row	Neath	
Martyn Morris	Back row	Neath	
Rowland Phillips	Back row	Neath	
Alan Reynolds	Back row	Swansea	
Owain Williams	Back row	Bridgend	
Chris Bridges	Scrum-half	Neath	
Steve Fealey	Scrum-half	Newbridge	
Robert Jones	Scrum-half	Swansea	Original captain; withdrew
Tony Clement	Fly-half	Swansea	
David Wyn Evans	Fly-half	Cardiff	Withdrew
Aled Williams	Fly-half	Bridgend	
Allan Bateman	Centre	Neath	
Mike Hall	Centre	Cardiff	Withdrew
Stuart Parfitt	Centre	Swansea	
Mark Ring	Centre	Cardiff	
Steve Bowling	Wing	Llanelli	
Alan Edmunds	Wing	Neath	Withdrew
Arthur Emyr	Wing	Swansea	
Steve Ford	Wing	Cardiff	
Mike Rayer	Full-back	Cardiff	
Paul Thorburn	Full-back	Neath	
