= 1991 Wales rugby union tour of Australia =

- Manager: Clive Rowlands
- Coach: Ron Waldron
- Tour captain: Paul Thorburn
Summary
P	W	D	L
Total
6	3	0	3
Test match
1	0	0	1
Opponent
P	W	D	L
Australia
1	0	0	1

Tour chronology
- ← 1990 Namibia 1993 Africa →

The Wales national rugby union team toured Australia in June and July 1991. They played six matches, culminating with a test against the Australia national team (the Wallabies). They won their opening match against Western Australia, as well as the games against the Australian Capital Territory and Queensland Country, but lost the tour matches against Queensland and New South Wales before a 63–6 loss to the Wallabies in the test. Prop Mark Davis was the only Wales player to make his test debut on the tour.

== Matches ==
Date	Venue	Home	Score	Away
30 June 1991	Perry Lakes Stadium, Perth	Western Australia	6–22	Welsh XV
7 July 1991	Ballymore, Brisbane	Queensland	35–24	Welsh XV
10 July 1991	Manuka Oval, Canberra	Australian Capital Territory	3–7	Welsh XV
14 July 1991	Concord Oval, Sydney	New South Wales	71–8	Welsh XV
17 July 1991	Rugby Oval, Rockhampton	Queensland Country	7–37	Welsh XV
21 July 1991	Ballymore, Brisbane	Australia	63–6	Wales

=== Western Australia vs Welsh XV ===
30 June 1991

Western Australia	6–22	Welsh XV
Pen: Johns (2)		Try: R. Jones; D. Evans; A. Davies; Lewis; Pen: D. Evans; Drop: A. Davies

Perry Lakes Stadium, Perth

=== Queensland vs Welsh XV ===
7 July 1991

Queensland	35–24	Welsh XV
Try: Scott-Young; Slattery; Lynagh; Lillicrap; Little; Con: Lynagh (3); Pen: Lynagh (3)		Try: Webster (2); Ford; Ga. Llewellyn; Con: Thorburn; Drop: A. Davies (2)

Ballymore, Brisbane

=== Australian Capital Territory vs Welsh XV ===
10 July 1991

Australian Capital Territory	3–7	Welsh XV
Pen: Apps		Try: Legge; Pen: Jenkins

Manuka Oval, Canberra

=== New South Wales vs Welsh XV ===
14 July 1991

New South Wales	71–8	Welsh XV
Try: Campese (5); Farr-Jones; Gavin; McKenzie; Egerton; Waugh; Ekert; Roebuck; Penalty try Con: Roebuck (8); Pen: Roebuck		Try: R. Jones; Hall

Concord Oval, Sydney

=== Queensland Country vs Welsh XV ===
17 July 1991

Queensland Country	7–35	Welsh XV
Try: Perrin; Pen: Sprecher		Try: Hall (2); L. Evans (2); Clement; Penalty try Con: D. Evans (4); Drop: A. Davies

Rugby Oval, Rockhampton

=== Australia vs Wales ===
21 July 1991

Australia	63–6	Wales
Try: Lynagh (2); Kearns (2); Gavin (2); Ofahengaue; Horan; Roebuck; Campese; Egerton; Little; Con: Lynagh (6); Pen: Lynagh		Pen: Thorburn; Drop: A. Davies

Ballymore, Brisbane
Referee: Fred Howard (England)

FB	15	Marty Roebuck
RW	14	David Campese
OC	13	Jason Little
IC	12	Tim Horan
LW	11	Bob Egerton
FH	10	Michael Lynagh
SH	9	Nick Farr-Jones (c)	Substituted off
N8	8	Tim Gavin
OF	7	Jeff Miller
BF	6	Viliami Ofahengaue
RL	5	John Eales
LL	4	Rod McCall
TP	3	Ewen McKenzie
HK	2	Phil Kearns
LP	1	Tony Daly
Replacements:
SH		Peter Slattery	Substituted on
Coach:
Bob Dwyer

FB	15	Paul Thorburn (c)	Substituted off
RW	14	Ieuan Evans
OC	13	Scott Gibbs
IC	12	Mike Hall
LW	11	Steve Ford	Substituted off
FH	10	Adrian Davies
SH	9	Chris Bridges
N8	8	Phil Davies	Substituted off
OF	7	Richie Collins
BF	6	Emyr Lewis
RL	5	Paul Arnold
LL	4	Glyn Llewellyn
TP	3	Hugh Williams-Jones
HK	2	Kevin Phillips
LP	1	Mark Davis
Replacements:
FB		Tony Clement	Substituted on
FH		David Wyn Evans	Substituted on
LK		Gareth Llewellyn	Substituted on
Coach:
Alan Davies

== Squad ==
Name	Position	Club	Notes
Paul Thorburn	Full-back	Neath	Captain
Kevin Phillips	Hooker	Neath	
Ken Waters	Hooker	Newbridge	
Mark Davis	Prop	Newport	
Mike Griffiths	Prop	Cardiff	
Paul Knight	Prop	Pontypridd	
Hugh Williams-Jones	Prop	South Wales Police	
Paul Arnold	Lock	Swansea	
Gareth Llewellyn	Lock	Neath	
Glyn Llewellyn	Lock	Neath	
Richie Collins	Back row	Cardiff	
Phil Davies	Back row	Llanelli	
Richard Goodey	Back row	Pontypool	
Ian Hembrow	Back row	Cardiff	Withdrew due to injury
Sean Legge	Back row	Glamorgan Wanderers	Replacement for Ian Hembrow
Emyr Lewis	Back row	Llanelli	
Martyn Morris	Back row	Neath	
Richard Webster	Back row	Swansea	
Chris Bridges	Scrum-half	Neath	
Robert Jones	Scrum-half	Swansea	
Adrian Davies	Fly-half	Neath	
David Wyn Evans	Fly-half	Cardiff	
Neil Jenkins	Fly-half	Pontypridd	
Scott Gibbs	Centre	Neath	
Mike Hall	Centre	Cardiff	
Steele Lewis	Centre	Pontypridd	
Ieuan Evans	Wing	Llanelli	
Steve Ford	Wing	Cardiff	
Ian Jones	Wing	Llanelli	
Tony Clement	Full-back	Swansea	
Luc Evans	Full-back	Llanelli	
