= Alan Reynolds =

Alan Reynolds may refer to:

- Alan Reynolds (actor) (1908–76), American actor known for Cape Fear (1962)
- Alan Reynolds (economist) (born c. 1942), supply-side economist
- Alan Reynolds (footballer) (born 1974), Irish footballer and coach
- Alan Reynolds (artist) (1926–2014), British painter
- Alan Reynolds (cricketer) (1879–1940), English cricketer and British Army officer
- Alan Reynolds (rugby union) (born 1966), Welsh rugby union player
