= Glen George =

Wales international rugby union player

- Full name: Glenn Maxfield George
- Born: 30 September 1964 (age 62) Newport, Wales

Rugby union career
- Position: Flanker
International career
Years	Team	Apps	(Points)
1991	Wales	2	(0)

Glenn Maxfield George (born 30 September 1964) is a Welsh former rugby union international.

George was born in Newport and attended Lliswerry High School.

A flanker, George began playing for Newport RFC in 1984-85 and was captain of the club for five seasons, which included Newport's 1990–91 Division One title, securing them promotion to the Premier Division.

George earned a Wales call up for the 1991 Five Nations Championship campaign. He played in the matches against England and Scotland, as part of an inexperienced Wales back row, with Alun Carter also previously uncapped.

Remaining with Newport until 1993, George went on to play with Rumney, Rhymney and Fleur de Lys.

== See also ==
- List of Wales national rugby union players
