= Max Llewellyn (rugby union) =

Wales international rugby union player (born 1999)

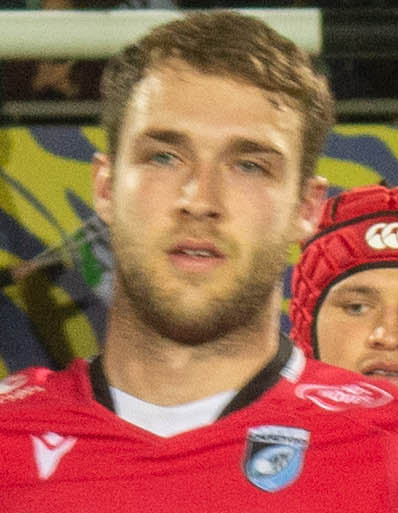
- Llewellyn in 2023
- Born: Max Llewellyn; 13 January 1999 (age 27) Kingston upon Thames, England
- Height: 195 cm (6 ft 5 in)
- Weight: 107 kg (16 st 12 lb; 236 lb)
- School: Ysgol Gyfun Gymraeg Glantaf
- University: Cardiff Metropolitan University
- Notable relative(s): Gareth Llewellyn (father), Glyn Llewellyn (uncle)

Rugby union career
- Position: Centre
- Current team: Gloucester
Senior career
Years	Team	Apps	(Points)
2017–2023	Cardiff	46	(25)
2023–	Gloucester	55	(85)
- Correct as of 31 October 2026
International career
Years	Team	Apps	(Points)
2018–2019	Wales U20	14	(5)
2023–	Wales	15	(5)
- Correct as of 18 November 2026

Max Llewellyn (born 13 January 1999) is a Welsh rugby union player who plays for Gloucester and the Wales national team as a centre. Llewellyn came through the Cardiff academy, and made his professional debut with the club in 2017, before signing with Gloucester in 2023. Llewellyn has represented Wales, making his debut on 5 August 2023.

== Club career ==
=== Cardiff ===
Llewellyn attended Cardiff Metropolitan University where he played for their rugby team in the BUCS Super Rugby tournament.

A member of the Cardiff academy, Llewellyn made his debut on 17 November 2017, coming off the bench in an Anglo-Welsh Cup match against the Ospreys. Llewellyn made his first appearance in the Pro14 on 28 April 2018, in the annual Judgement Day fixture, again coming off the bench against the Ospreys.

Llewellyn scored his first try for Cardiff on 24 April 2021, and set up their second after a break.

On 20 March 2023, it was announced that Llewellyn had signed a contract for Premiership Rugby side Gloucester Rugby for the 2023–24 season. Prior to departing Cardiff, he was named as Player's Player of the Season, at the end-of-season awards.

=== Gloucester ===
Llewellyn made his debut for Gloucester against Saracens in the Premiership Rugby Cup.

Llewellyn scored a hat-trick of tries against Leicester Tigers on 21 October 2024.

== International career ==
=== Wales U20 ===
Llewellyn was first selected for Wales U20 for the 2018 Six Nations Under 20s Championship. He made 14 appearances for the side over two seasons, scoring a try against Italy in the 2018 World Rugby Under 20 Championship.

=== Wales ===
He was widely tipped to be included in the Wales squad for the 2023 Six Nations Championship, but ruled out of the early stages of the tournament due to injury.

On 1 May 2023, Llewellyn was called up to the Wales 54-man training squad ahead of the 2023 Rugby World Cup.

Llewellyn made his debut on 5 August 2023, starting for Wales in the first test of their 2023 Rugby World Cup warm-up matches, in a win against England. Llewellyn was ultimately not selected in the final squad for the tournament.

Llewellyn returned to the Wales squad for the 2024 end-of-year rugby union internationals, and started all three matches. Llewellyn was controversially omitted from the squad for the 2025 Six Nations Championship by then-head coach Warren Gatland, but was recalled to the squad by interim head coach Matt Sherratt. In the match against Scotland, Llewellyn scored his first international try.

Llewellyn missed out on selection for the 2025 Wales rugby union tour of Japan due to a hamstring injury while playing for Gloucester.

Llewellyn was selected for the 2025 end-of-year rugby union internationals. He started against Argentina, Japan, and New Zealand.

== Personal life ==
His father is 92-cap Welsh international Gareth Llewellyn. His uncle, Glyn Llewellyn, also represented Wales. A former pupil of Ysgol Gyfun Gymraeg Glantaf, he is a fluent Welsh speaker.
