= Luke Ford (rugby union) =

Welsh rugby union player

- Born: 8 March 1988 (age 38) Wales
- Height: 1.88 m (6 ft 2 in)
- Weight: 102 kg (16 st 1 lb)
- University: Glamorgan University
- Notable relative(s): Steve Ford, father. Lloyd White, Cousin
- Occupation: Quantity Surveyor

Rugby union career
- Position: Centre / Wing (rugby union)
Senior career
Years	Team	Apps	(Points)
2006-	Glamorgan Wanderers		((?))
2009-	Neath RFC		
- Correct as of 19:53, 11 February 2008 (UTC)
Provincial / State sides
Years	Team	Apps	(Points)
2007–2009	Cardiff Blues		
- Correct as of 19:53, 11 February 2008 (UTC)
International career
Years	Team	Apps	(Points)
2006-2007	Wales U19	6	(0)
2007-	Wales U20	2	(0)

Luke Ford (born 8 March 1988) is a Welsh rugby union player who plays Centre (rugby union)for Neath RFC and was once part of the Cardiff Blues squad.

He is the son of Wales international rugby player, Steve Ford.
