= Jaco Coetzee =

Jaco Coetzee may refer to:

- Jaco Coetzee, born 1969, a South African rugby union player
- Jaco Coetzee (rugby union, born 1970), a Namibian rugby union international
- Jaco Coetzee (rugby union, born 1996), a South African rugby union player
