= Ken Waters (disambiguation) =

Ken Waters (born 1961) is a Welsh rugby union player.

Ken Waters may also refer to:

- Ken Waters (Australian politician), a Member of the Northern Territory Legislative Council, 1962–1965
- Ken Waters (Canadian politician), incumbent in the 1953 Toronto municipal election and later
