= Brian Williams (rugby union) =

Wales international rugby union footballer

- Born: Brian Richard Williams; 9 July 1960 Penffordd, Pembrokeshire, Wales
- Died: 7 February 2007 (aged 46) Llangolman, Pembrokeshire, Wales

Rugby union career
- Position: Prop
Senior career
Years	Team	Apps	(Points)
1983-1995	Neath RFC		
International career
Years	Team	Apps	(Points)
1990-1991	Wales	5	(0)

Brian Richard Williams (9 July 1960 – 7 February 2007) was a Welsh international rugby union player.

== Life and career ==
Williams was born in Penffordd, near Maenclochog in Pembrokeshire, into the West Wales farming community. He began playing rugby at Ysgol y Preseli, Narberth RFC and Pembrokeshire RFC, with his brothers John and Anthony. His nephew Andrew is currently at scrum-half in Narberth's set-up.

Williams was spotted and signed for Neath RFC. During a single major club career which spanned 16 years, Williams played for the club more than 250 times. He made his debut as a first-class player in 1983, against Bridgend RFC, and went on to become one of the club's most popular players. He played as a prop, despite his relatively light build (6'1" tall and weighing little more than 14 stone) which belied his incredible strength - Gareth Llewellyn said that Williams was "the fittest and most powerful man" he ever played rugby with. Williams was one of three players in Neath's "farming" front row, alongside his near neighbours Kevin Phillips and fellow prop Jeremy Pugh, later replaced by neighbour John Davies. Williams played in the Neath side that was Welsh Club Champions in 1986/7, 1988/9 and 1989/90, won the inaugural Welsh Premier Division title in 1990/1, and also won the WRU Challenge Cup in 1988/9 and 1989/90. Williams featured in the Neath side that set new world records for tries (385) and points (1917) in the 1988-89 season; and played for the club against several international touring sides.

Anecdotally, when Neath went on tour to Russia, Williams placed his luggage on the scales at check in and it weighed in around 40kg. When questioned, Brian confessed that “he had tins of corned beef in there. I’m not eating any of their stuff!”

His build may have delayed him being selected to play for Wales, and he had to wait for his international debut until 1990, by which time Neath coach Ron Waldron had taken charge of the Welsh team. He made his first appearance for Wales in a Five Nations match against Scotland in Cardiff on 3 March 1990. He played in five international matches, all defeats, his final international being the Five Nations match against Scotland at Murrayfield on 2 February 1991. When Ospreys prop Duncan Jones led Wales for the first time in June 2006, he said that he had "always looked up to Brian Williams in the way he played." Williams retired from the first-class game in 1995 to run his dairy farm, having played over 250 games for Neath.

== Death ==
Williams died at the age of 46 in Llangolman, in Pembrokeshire of a suspected heart attack, having been actively involved in a club reunion at The Gnoll rugby ground only four days earlier. He was survived by his wife and two daughters.
