= 1993 England rugby union tour of Canada =

1993 series of rugby matches

Summary
P	W	D	L
Total
5	4	0	1
Test match
2	1	0	1
Opponent
P	W	D	L
Canada
2	1	0	1

The 1993 England rugby union tour of Canada was a series of five matches played by the England national rugby union team in Canada in May and June 1993. England won four matches and lost one. They drew their two-match international series against Canada, losing the first game and winning the second. Sixteen England players were taking part in the 1993 British Lions tour to New Zealand at the time, and England did not award international caps for the matches with Canada.

== Results ==
Scores and results list England's points tally first.

Date	Opponent	Location	Result	Score
22 May	British Columbia	Victoria	Won	26–10
12 June	British Columbia President's XV	Thunderbird Stadium, Vancouver	Won	26–11
29 May	CANADA	Swangard Stadium, Burnaby	Lost	12–15
2 June	Ontario	Toronto	Won	40–7
5 June	CANADA	Twin Elm Rugby Park, Nepean	Won	19–14

== Touring party ==
- Manager: Peter Rossborough
- Coach: Mike Slemen
- Assistant coach: K. Richardson
- Captain: John Olver

=== Full backs ===
- David Pears (Harlequins)
- Alan Buzza (Wasps)

=== Three-quarters ===
- Steve Hackney (Leicester)
- Nick Beal (Northampton)
- Chris Oti (Wasps)
- Adedayo Adebayo (Bath)
- John Fletcher (Tynedale)
- Phil de Glanville (Bath)
- Damian Hopley (Wasps)
- Graham Childs (Wasps)
- Stuart Potter (Leicester)

=== Half-backs ===
- Paul Challinor (Harlequins)
- Paul Grayson (Waterloo)
- S. Douglas (Newcastle Gosforth)
- Matt Dawson (Northampton)
- Kyran Bracken (Saracens)

=== Forwards ===
- Graham Rowntree (Leicester)
- Martin Hynes (Orrell)
- Darren Garforth (Leicester)
- Victor Ubogu (Bath)
- John Olver (Northampton)
- Kevin Dunn (Wasps)
- Martin Johnson (Leicester)
- Andy Blackmore (Bristol)
- Alex Snow (Harlequins)
- Nigel Redman (Bath)
- Jon Hall (Bath)
- Mark Rennell (Bedford) replacement during tour
- Tim Rodber (Northampton)
- Matt Greenwood (Wasps)
- Dean Ryan (Wasps)
- Steve Ojomoh (Bath)
- Neil Back (Leicester)
- Richard Langhorn (Harlequins) replacement during tour
