= Nottingham R.F.C. =

English rugby union football team

(England) Nottingham R.F.C.
- Full name: Nottingham Rugby Club
- Union: Notts, Lincs & Derbyshire RFU
- Founded: 1877; 149 years ago
- Ground: Lady Bay Sports Ground (Capacity: 3,700 (Note: Lady Bay capacity increased from 3,500 to 3,700 for the 2024–25 season.))
- Chairman: Alistair Bow
- President: Nigel Bettinson-Eatch
- Director of Rugby: Craig Hammond
- League: Champ Rugby
- 2025–26: 9th of 14
Home kit	Away kit

Official website
- nottinghamrugby.co.uk

Nottingham Rugby Club is a rugby union club based in Nottingham, England. The club's first team currently plays in the Champ Rugby, the second tier of the English rugby union system.

The first XV are nicknamed The Archers, in reference to the famous Robin Hood. Now situated in the Lady Bay area of Nottingham, the club was formerly based at Meadow Lane, the home ground of Notts County F.C. They previously played at Ireland Avenue in Beeston until the end of the 2005–06 season.

== History ==
The club was established circa 1877 by Alexander Birkin after returning from Rugby School, where he was introduced to the sport. The Birkin family later purchased the land at Ireland Avenue that would be the home of the club until 2006.

The club's heyday was in the late 1980s with a number of top international players representing the first XV. These included Simon Hodgkinson, Rob Andrew, Gary Rees, Dusty Hare and Brian Moore (also a Lion) representing England and Chris Gray representing Scotland.

The advent of professionalism saw the Green & Whites fall on hard times and the first XV narrowly avoided relegation to the regional divisions in 2002–03. The club has bounced back since then and was promoted into National League One in 2003–04. The club finished a creditable 7th in 2005–06 before leaving Ireland Avenue after 102 years. Alistair Bow was appointed chairman in 2010 after having been a director since 2008.

On 30 July 2010 the club signed an agreement to become part of Notts County PLC.

In early July 2012 it was announced that Martin Haag had become the new director of rugby at the club. Martin Haag appointed Dan Montagu captain on 21 July 2015. He replaced Brent Wilson who retired at the end of 2014–15 season. Since then Ian Costello has been appointed as Head Coach, with Neil Fowkes and Alex O'Dowd rounding out the coaching team.

A change in funding by the RFU ahead of the 2020–21 season forced the club into become only a part-time professional club.

== Ground ==
Founded in 1877, the club originally played in a field behind the White Hart Inn in Lenton. In 1904 the club purchased land in the village of Beeston and were able to have their first permanent ground, initially known as Rylands Road but becoming Ireland Avenue by 1947. By the advent of league rugby in the late 1980s the capacity of Ireland Avenue was 4,990 which included a covered grandstand with 590 seats and space for around 4,400 standing. The club would play at Ireland Avenue for over a century, eventually selling the ground for housing development in 2004.

The club spent a couple of seasons ground sharing at Notts County's home, Meadow Lane between 2004 and 2006. Since 2006 the club have been based at Lady Bay Sports Ground at Lady Bay. Ground capacity at Lady Bay was originally 3,500 but this has risen to 3,700 for the 2024–25 season, when a Lady Bay ground record of 3,690 watched the club's Premiership Rugby Cup game against Leicester Tigers on 22 November 2024.

== Honours ==
- Midland Counties Senior Cup winners: 1905–06
- Midland Counties Junior Cup winners: 1907–08
- Noel Syson Cup (Notts, Lincs & Derby Sevens) winners: 1935, 1936, 1943, 1944, 1945, 1949, 1950, 1951, 1952, 1955, 1959, 1965, 1966, 1967, 1970, 1971, 1972, 1973, 1974, 1975, 1976, 1980, 1981, 1983
- Middlesex Sevens winners: 1944–45
- Midland Merit Table champions: 1984–85
- Selkirk Sevens winners: 1990–91

== Current standings ==
2026–27 Champ Rugby table
Pos	Team	Pld	W	D	L	PF	PA	PD	TF	TA	TB	LB	Pts	Qualification
1	Worcester Warriors	5	5	0	0	246	95	+151	37	14	4	0	24	Play-off semi-finals
2	Ealing Trailfinders	5	4	0	1	242	109	+133	38	16	4	1	21	Play-off semi-finals
3	Coventry	5	4	0	1	243	171	+72	36	26	2	1	19	Play-off quarter-finals
4	Rotherham Titans	5	4	0	1	160	191	−31	25	29	1	0	17	Play-off quarter-finals
5	Ampthill	5	4	0	1	195	195	0	29	29	0	0	16	Play-off quarter-finals
6	Cornish Pirates	5	3	0	2	182	187	−5	27	28	2	0	14	Play-off quarter-finals
7	Chinnor	5	3	0	2	180	183	−3	22	21	1	0	13	
8	Doncaster Knights	5	2	0	3	161	152	+9	24	21	1	2	11	
9	Bedford Blues	5	2	0	3	143	158	−15	22	24	2	1	11	
10	Blackheath	5	1	0	4	146	189	−43	20	27	0	3	7	
11	Caldy	5	1	0	4	176	206	−30	25	31	0	2	6	
12	Nottingham	5	1	0	4	128	206	−78	19	32	0	1	5	Relegation play-off
13	Hartpury	5	1	0	4	116	207	−91	16	31	0	1	5	Relegation play-off
14	Richmond	5	0	0	5	123	192	−69	19	29	0	1	1	Relegated

First match(es) will be played: 18 September 2026. Source:
Rules for classification: If teams are level at any stage, tiebreakers are applied in the following order:
1. Number of matches won
2. Number of matches drawn
3. Difference between points for and against
4. Total number of points for
5. Aggregate number of points scored in matches between tied teams
6. Number of matches won excluding the first match, then the second and so on until the tie is settled

== Current squad ==
The Nottingham squad for the 2025–26 season is:

Nottingham 2025–26 Champ Rugby squad
**Props**: (England) Archie van der Flier (Note: Leicester Tigers players who are dual-registered with the club for the 2025-26 season.); (Sweden) **Ale Loman**; (England) Dan Richardson; (Netherlands) Mink Scharink; (Samoa) **Aniseko Sio**; (England) Oscar Stott; **Hookers**: (New Zealand) Arthur Allen; (England) Ben Brownlie; (England) Jack Dickinson; (England) Finn Theobald-Thomas (Note: Leicester Tigers players who are dual-registered with the club for the 2025-26 season.); **Locks**: (England) Jay Ecclesfield; (England) Michael Etete; (England) Tom Manz (Note: Leicester Tigers players who are dual-registered with the club for the 2025-26 season.); (Wales) Osian Thomas	**Back row**: (England) James Cherry; (England) Sam Green; (Wales) Iestyn Rees; (England) Kody Vereti; (England) Sam Williams (Note: Leicester Tigers players who are dual-registered with the club for the 2025-26 season.); (England) Jacob Wright; **Scrum-halves**: (England) Josh Goodwin; (England) Will Yarnell; **Fly-halves**: (England) Evan Mitchell; (Wales) Gwyn Parks; (England) Charlie West	**Centres**: (New Zealand) Kegan Christian-Goss; (England) Charlie Davies; (England) Michael Green; (England) Wilf McCarthy (Note: Leicester Tigers players who are dual-registered with the club for the 2025-26 season.); (England) Levi Roper; **Wings**: (England) Harry Graham; (England) Sam Mercer; (England) Luke Rokomoce; (England) David Williams; **Fullbacks**: (United Arab Emirates) **Jack Stapley**
**(c)** denotes the team captain. (vc) denotes vice-captain. **Bold** denotes internationally capped players.^{ST} denotes a short-term signing. Source:

== Notable former players ==
=== British & Irish Lions ===
The following Nottingham players have been selected for the Lions tours while at the club:

- Brian Moore (1989)

=== Rugby World Cup ===
The following are players which have represented their countries at the Rugby World Cup while playing for Nottingham:

Tournament	Players selected	England players	Other national team players
1987	2	Brian Moore, Gary Rees	
1991	3	Gary Rees, Simon Hodgkinson	Chris Gray (Scotland)
2011	4		James Arlidge (Japan) , Sione Kalamafoni (Tonga) , Tim Usasz (United States) , Filipo Levi (Samoa)
2019	1		Shane O'Leary (Canada)

=== Other notable former players ===
The following players have played for Nottingham and have been capped by their national side.

- Rob Andrew, England and British & Irish Lions
- Vincent Cartwright, England captain
- Dusty Hare, England and British & Irish Lions
- Chris Wyles, United States
- (New Zealand) Ali Williams, All Black #1022
- Chris Oti, England
- Tom Youngs, England and British & Irish Lions
- Alex Corbisiero, England and British & Irish Lions
- Nick Preston, England
- Neil Back, England and British & Irish Lions
- Billy Twelvetrees, England
- Ollie Chessum, England and British & Irish Lions
- Joe Carpenter, England
- George Furbank, England
- Will Stuart, England and British & Irish Lions
- Josh Adams, Wales and British & Irish Lions
- Ellis Mee, Wales
- Ale Loman, Sweden
- (United Arab Emirates) Jack Stapley, UAE
