= Jean-François Gourragne =

French rugby union player (born 1963)

- Born: 20 November 1963 (age 62) Condom, Gers, France
- Height: 6 ft 5 in (196 cm)
- Weight: 252 lb (114 kg)

Rugby union career
- Position: Lock
International career
Years	Team	Apps	(Points)
1990–91	France	2	(0)

Jean-François Gourragne (born 20 November 1963) is a French former rugby union international.

Born in Condom, Gers, Gourragne was a product of the town's SA Condom club, where he played junior rugby as a winger, before a growth spurt at age 15. He played for RO Castelnaudary in the early 1980s while attending agricultural school.

Gourragne, a lock, began his career at the top level in 1985 with AS Béziers and was capped twice for France, against the All Blacks in 1990 and Wales in the 1991 Five Nations Championship. He played in the Castres Olympique team that contested the final of the 1996–97 European Challenge Cup, losing to CS Bourgoin.

Retiring as a player in 1999, Gourragne served stints as forwards coach at both AS Béziers and AS Montferrand. He was briefly the caretaker coach of AS Béziers in late 2008, until the appointment of Jean-François Beltran.

== See also ==
- List of France national rugby union players
