= Keith Maddocks =

Welsh rugby union player

- Born: 16 June 1927 Tonna, Neath, Wales
- Died: 5 June 2005 (aged 77) Plymouth, Devon, England
- School: Cowbridge Grammar School
- University: St Luke's College, Exeter
- Occupation: School teacher

Rugby union career
- Position: Wing
International career
Years	Team	Apps	(Points)
1957	Wales	1	(0)

Keith Maddocks (16 June 1927 – 5 June 2005) was a Welsh international rugby union player.

Maddocks, a Cowbridge Grammar School product, played rugby at St Luke's College, Exeter, while studying teaching and was a Devon County representative player. He made his first Welsh trials in 1949 while with St Luke's.

A speedy winger, Maddocks spent most of his career with Neath. He was a regular try-scorer and had six in a single match against Ebbw Vale as captain in the 1956–57 season, in which he finished with 27 tries. In the 1957 Five Nations, Maddocks won his solitary Wales cap against England at Cardiff Arms Park and conceded a first-half penalty when he was caught off-side, with Fenwick Allison's successful kick proving to be the only score of the match.

Maddocks was an English teacher at St Boniface's School in Plymouth, Devon.

== See also ==
- List of Wales national rugby union players
