= Grégoire Lascubé =

France international rugby union player

Grégoire Lascubé (born Saint-Pée-sur-Nivelle, 3 April 1962) is a former French rugby union player. He played as a prop.

Lascubé played for Biarritz Olympique and SU Agen, where he won the French Championship, in 1987/88, being runners-up in 1989/90, and the Cup of France in 1991/92.

He had 12 caps for France, from 1991 to 1992, never scoring. His first game was at the 15-9 win over Scotland, at 19 January 1991, aged 28 years old, for the Five Nations Championship. He played all the four games at the 1991 Five Nations Championship, being selected for the 1991 Rugby World Cup, where he played four games. He played twice at the 1992 Five Nations Championship, being expelled at the 13-31 loss to England, at 15 February 1992, in what would be his last appearance for the National Team.
