= Stuart Parfitt =

- Full name: Stuart Ashley Parfitt
- Born: 4 March 1966 (age 60) Usk, Wales

Rugby union career
- Position: Centre
International career
Years	Team	Apps	(Points)
1990	Wales	2	(0)

Stuart Ashley Parfitt QPM (born 4 March 1966) is a Welsh policeman and former rugby union international.

Born in Usk, Parfitt was a rugby union centre who was active in the 1980s and 1990s. He spent his career with Bridgend, Swansea and South Wales Police RFC. Capped twice for Wales in 1990, he debuted off the bench on a tour of Namibia and earned his other cap back home against the Barbarians at the National Stadium in Cardiff.

Parfitt was a senior officer with South Wales Police, which he joined in 1991. He was awarded the Queen's Police Medal in the 2016 Birthday Honours for his services to South Wales Police.

== See also ==
- List of Wales national rugby union players
