= Will Carling =

British Lions & England international rugby union player

Will Carling OBE
- Born: William David Charles Carling; 12 December 1965 (age 60) Bradford-on-Avon, Wiltshire, England
- Height: 1.80 m (5 ft 11 in)
- Weight: 90 kg (198 lb; 14 st 2 lb)
- School: Sedbergh School
- University: University of Durham

Rugby union career
- Position: Centre
Senior career
Years	Team	Apps	(Points)
1987–2000	Harlequins		
International career
Years	Team	Apps	(Points)
1988–1997	England	72	(54)
1993	British Lions	1	(0)

William David Charles Carling (born 12 December 1965) is an English former rugby union player. He was England's youngest captain, aged 22, and won 72 caps from 1988 to 1996, captaining England 59 times. Under his captaincy, England won Five Nations Grand Slams in 1991, 1992 and 1995, and reached the 1991 World Cup final.

He played for Rosslyn Park and Harlequins at club level. In the 1992 New Year Honours, he was appointed an Officer of the Order of the British Empire (OBE).

Since retiring, Carling has pursued interests including corporate speaking and punditry. In 2018 he joined the England coaching staff of Eddie Jones as a leadership mentor.

== Early life and education ==
The son of Lieutenant Colonel Bill Carling, an officer in the Royal Regiment of Wales, Carling was born in Bradford-on-Avon and educated at Terra Nova School in Cheshire and then Sedbergh School, on an army scholarship. (Note: In his autobiography Carling states this was actually an art scholarship, "worth all of £45", having discovered a passion for the subject at Terra Nova School.) He disliked being sent to prep school but showed an aptitude for rugby and played above his age group, arriving at Sedbergh – a "big rugby school" – with a reputation as a serious talent.

On 2 April 1983 he made his debut for England Schools in a 16–0 victory over Ireland. He narrowly missed out on a junior Grand Slam, with an England Schools side that included Kevin Simms, Victor Ubogu and Carling's future Durham and Harlequins teammate Andy Mullins, losing 13–12 to Wales. Carling was made captain of the rugby 1st XV in his final year at school, albeit for Lent term only. Having also shown some talent for cricket, he sought the additional captaincy of the cricket team, but lost out to Mark Alban.

=== University ===
Having decided for a career in the British Army like his father, Carling – after a gap year – took an in-service degree in psychology at Durham University. This meant the "occasional weekend exercise", but otherwise military activities were rather limited. He was an undergraduate student at Hatfield College, Durham (which had built a strong sporting reputation post-war), and was reunited with Mullins. Carling did not enjoy the transition from school to university rugby, and claimed to have "stagnated" in terms of development. Playing his first year at fullback, he had to accept a style of rugby that offered less creative freedom than he was used to.

"Caution was the watchword and it was not something I was used to. Instead of running everything, as you are encouraged to do in the idealistic world of schoolboy rugby, I was coached to kick, to play safety-first rugby."

Carling strongly considered giving up rugby after failing to enjoy his first year on the pitch at Durham, but found himself rejuvenated during an old boys' match at Sedbergh; and this reignited a desire to succeed in the sport. By his own admission he did not take his studies seriously and was often absent for lectures. He left with an ordinary pass degree in 1988. In January that year, Carling, still an undergraduate, made his debut for England against France at the Parc des Princes. In May he was invited to tour with England abroad, but the start date clashed with his final exams. Consequently, he took his exams two days early, and to safeguard examination security, was driven straight to Newcastle Airport.

Despite a less than stellar academic record, Carling had the opportunity to continue his education at the University of Cambridge and represent Cambridge University R.U.F.C., who had already recruited his Durham colleague Chris Oti. (Note: During the 1970s and 1980s, Cambridge often recruited Durham graduates as a way of enhancing their rugby squad. From 1974 to 1984, the Cambridge XV in The Varsity Match had at least one former Durham student, and usually more.) Carling did not follow up the invitation, believing it would be unethical to accept a place he had not earned.

== Career ==
=== Early career, 1987–1991 ===
The England rugby team were in a period of transition following failure at the 1987 Rugby World Cup. There was a new manager, Geoff Cooke, and a new coach, Roger Uttley, replacing Mike Weston and Martin Green. England's recent record was one of considerable underachievement, described by one writer as a "sprawling desert of failure, stretching back as far as 1963" — they had only won a single Five Nations Championship since then, in 1980. The new season offered good prospects for younger players, as league rugby was introduced for the first time, establishing a "proper system which rewarded progress"; Divisional Championships, which brought the best club players into regional teams, would not necessarily be the main method of selection in future.

In February 1987 Carling made his debut for Harlequins against the Metropolitan Police. He soon played for England B in a 22–9 win over France B. Carling sensed he had a chance of earning his first senior England cap when Kevin Simms, a former England Schoolboys teammate, was selected to play against Romania. As Carling knew the strengths and weaknesses of Simms and "wasn't in awe of him", expectation that he might match this achievement grew.

"...Simmsy was one of us. He unpicked the myth and also provided the motivation. If he could do it, then so could I. Maybe those blokes in the England side weren't so special after all."

Around Christmas 1987, Carling took part in an England trial for the upcoming Five Nations Championship. Initially he and Simms were set to be part of a junior team set to test more experienced "probables" including Simon Halliday of Bath and John Buckton of Saracens; but both Halliday and Buckton pulled hamstrings, which saw Carling and Simms "bumped up". The team list was officially published the following Monday, and after some uncertainty, Carling realised he'd earned his first callup when a university friend phoned to congratulate him. His debut against France on 16 January was a defeat, with England losing 10–9 in Paris due to a late French score. Later comparing the atmosphere in the dressing room afterwards to a "morgue", Carling was nonetheless pleased with his own performance. Carling started the remaining games against Wales, Scotland and Ireland, with England winning the latter two to finish third in that years Five Nations Championship.

Though still expected to pursue a military career, Carling abandoned these plans. He has stated that, contrary to media suggestions, he was never "fully commissioned". By Carling's own account, he was due to attend Sandhurst for the full officer training course in August 1988, but his status as an England international meant the army would not be able to accommodate his rugby ambitions. As a result, Carling opted to "buy himself out" of the army for £8,000. (Note: This is Carling's version of events. It has also been reported that he simply resigned his commission when he returned from the tour to Australia and Fiji.) As rugby was an amateur game at this point, he accepted an executive post with Mobil Oil to make ends meet.

=== 1991–1995 ===
Under Carling England started to challenge and beat the established rugby union powers such as New Zealand and Australia, and their success helped to make rugby union a more popular sport in England. English victories over New Zealand and South Africa in 1993 were perhaps the peak of England's performance under Carling.

Carling's career included the 1993 British Lions tour to New Zealand. He underachieved on that tour, a pattern attributed by coach Ian McGeechan and manager Geoff Cooke as at least partly due to his failing to secure the captaincy (this instead going to Gavin Hastings of Scotland) but also due to the ascendency in the centre of both Jeremy Guscott and Scott Gibbs of Wales. McGeechan and Cooke disclosed that Carling came close to voluntarily withdrawing from the squad; he did regain his test place and played a notable role in the third test. McGeechan commented in his autobiography that Carling's failure to rise to the occasion as a Lion (in contrast to Guscott) may be seen by some as the difference between his legacy as a good player and a great player.

Also in 1993, he became the second captain after John Pullin to lead and beat all of the “Big Three” Southern Hemisphere sides: Australia, New Zealand and South Africa, after beating the All Blacks 15–9. He had earlier led England to wins against Australia in November 1988, and South Africa in November 1992. As captain, he had 2 wins against Australia, 1 against New Zealand, and 2 against South Africa.

=== 1995 World Cup ===
In the run-up to the 1995 World Cup, after England returned to form with their third Grand Slam in five years, Carling described the Rugby Football Union general committee as "57 old farts" which led to his sacking as captain. The incident had been provoked by administrator Dudley Wood's comments about England players' alleged desire to cheat by breaking the amateur ethic. He was quickly reinstated due to public pressure and following a public apology was able to go to the 1995 Rugby World Cup. After a slow start, England found form and subsequently won all their group games, then knocked out Australia in the quarter-final 25–22, thanks to a last-minute drop-goal from Rob Andrew. They were well beaten by New Zealand in the semi-final, largely thanks to four tries from Jonah Lomu. Although Carling himself scored two tries towards the end of that game, and set up two more for Rory Underwood, England lost 45–29. The subsequent loss in the third place play-off, against France, was England's first loss to the French in seven years.

Following his resignation from the England captaincy, he continued to be selected as an outside centre, usually with Guscott or Phil de Glanville; the latter succeeded him as captain.

== Life after rugby ==
After his rugby career ended he became a TV pundit on rugby union. He has also worked as a motivational speaker and in 2001 founded Will Carling Management Ltd, a corporate hospitality company which is also involved in the rugby social networking website 'Rucku'.

== Personal life ==
Carling is married to his second wife Lisa, the ex-wife of David Cooke; the couple have two children. Carling was married to the television presenter Julia Carling (née Smith) from 1994 to 1996. Prior to their divorce, he was romantically linked by some members of the press with Diana, Princess of Wales, the then-wife of Prince Charles. Carling has denied any such relationship.

Carling, whose mother was diagnosed with breast cancer when he was an infant and later died from the disease, is a patron of the charity Breakthrough Breast Cancer.

== Politics ==
In August 2014, Carling was one of 200 public figures who were signatories to a letter to The Guardian opposing Scottish independence in the run-up to September's referendum on that issue.

== Matches as captain ==
No.	Date	Opposition	Venue	Score	Status	Notes
1988
1	5 November	Australia	Twickenham, London	28–19	Test Match	
1989
2	4 February	Scotland	Twickenham, London	12–12	1989 Five Nations	
3	18 February	Ireland	Lansdowne Road, Dublin	16–3	1989 Five Nations	
4	4 March	France	Twickenham, London	11–0	1989 Five Nations	1 Try
5	18 March	Wales	National Stadium, Cardiff	9–12	1989 Five Nations	
6	4 November	Fiji	Twickenham, London	58–23	Test Match	
1990
7	20 January	Ireland	Twickenham, London	23–0	1990 Five Nations	
8	3 February	France	Parc des Princes, Paris	26–7	1990 Five Nations	1 Try
9	17 February	Wales	Twickenham, London	34–6	1990 Five Nations	1 Try
10	17 March	Scotland	Murrayfield, Edinburgh	7–13	1990 Five Nations	
11	28 July	Argentina	Vélez Sársfield, Buenos Aires	25–12	Argentina Series	
12	4 August	Argentina	Vélez Sársfield, Buenos Aires	13–15	Argentina Series	
13	3 November	Argentina	Twickenham, London	51–0	Test Match	
1991
14	19 January	Wales	National Stadium, Cardiff	25–6	1991 Five Nations	
15	16 February	Scotland	Twickenham, London	21–12	1991 Five Nations	
16	2 March	Ireland	Lansdowne Road, Dublin	16–7	1991 Five Nations	
17	16 March	France	Twickenham, London	21–19	1991 Five Nations	
18	20 July	Fiji	National Stadium, Suva	28–12	Test Match	
19	27 July	Australia	Sydney Football Stadium, Sydney	15–40	Test Match	
20	3 October	New Zealand	Twickenham, London	12–18	1991 Rugby World Cup	
21	8 October	Italy	Twickenham, London	36–6	1991 Rugby World Cup	
22	11 October	United States	Twickenham, London	37–9	1991 Rugby World Cup	1 Try
23	19 October	France	Parc des Princes, Paris	19–10	1991 Rugby World Cup	1 Try
24	26 October	Scotland	Murrayfield, Edinburgh	9–6	1991 Rugby World Cup	
25	2 November	Australia	Twickenham, London	6–12	1991 Rugby World Cup final	
1992
26	18 January	Scotland	Murrayfield, Edinburgh	25–7	1992 Five Nations	
27	1 February	Ireland	Twickenham, London	38–9	1992 Five Nations	
28	15 February	France	Parc des Princes, Paris	31–13	1992 Five Nations	
29	7 March	Wales	Twickenham, London	24–0	1992 Five Nations	1 Try
30	17 October	Canada	Wembley Stadium, London	26–13	Test Match	
31	14 November	South Africa	Twickenham, London	33–16	Test Match	1 Try
1993
32	16 January	France	Twickenham, London	16–15	1993 Five Nations	
33	9 February	Wales	National Stadium, Cardiff	9–10	1993 Five Nations	
34	6 March	Scotland	Twickenham, London	26–12	1993 Five Nations	
35	20 March	Ireland	Lansdowne Road, Dublin	3–17	1993 Five Nations	
36	27 November	New Zealand	Twickenham, London	15–9	Test Match	
1994
37	5 February	Scotland	Murrayfield, Edinburgh	15–14	1994 Five Nations	
38	19 February	Ireland	Twickenham, London	12–13	1994 Five Nations	
39	5 March	France	Parc des Princes, Paris	18–14	1994 Five Nations	
40	19 March	Wales	Twickenham, London	15–8	1994 Five Nations	
41	4 June	South Africa	Loftus Versfeld, Pretoria	32–15	South Africa Series	
42	11 June	South Africa	Newlands, Cape Town	9–27	South Africa Series	
43	12 November	Romania	Twickenham, London	54–3	Test Match	1 Try
44	10 December	Canada	Twickenham, London	60–9	Test Match	
1995
45	21 January	Ireland	Lansdowne Road, Dublin	20–8	1995 Five Nations	1 Try
46	4 February	France	Twickenham, London	31–10	1995 Five Nations	
47	18 February	Wales	National Stadium, Cardiff	23–9	1995 Five Nations	
48	18 March	Scotland	Twickenham, London	24–12	1995 Five Nations	
49	27 May	Argentina	Kings Park Stadium, Durban	24–18	1995 Rugby World Cup	
50	4 June	Western Samoa	Kings Park Stadium, Durban	44–22	1995 Rugby World Cup	
51	11 June	Australia	Newlands, Cape Town	25–22	1995 Rugby World Cup	
52	18 June	New Zealand	Newlands, Cape Town	29–45	1995 Rugby World Cup	2 Tries
53	22 June	France	Loftus Versfeld, Pretoria	9–19	1995 Rugby World Cup	
54	18 November	South Africa	Twickenham, London	14–24	Test Match	
55	16 December	Western Samoa	Twickenham, London	27–9	Test Match	
1996
56	20 January	France	Parc des Princes, Paris	12–15	1996 Five Nations	
57	3 February	Wales	Twickenham, London	21–15	1996 Five Nations	
58	2 March	Scotland	Murrayfield, Edinburgh	18–9	1996 Five Nations	
59	16 March	Ireland	Twickenham, London	28–15	1996 Five Nations	

=== Honours as captain ===
Rugby World Cup

- Runner-up: 1991

Five Nations Championship

- Champions: 1991 (Grand Slam and Triple Crown), 1992 (Grand Slam and Triple Crown), 1995 (Grand Slam and Triple Crown), 1996 (Triple Crown)
- Runners-up: 1989, 1990, 1994

Calcutta Cup

- Winners: 1989, 1991–1996
- Runners-up: 1990

Millennium Trophy

- Winners: 1989–1992, 1995–1996
- Runners-up: 1993–1994

== Honours ==
In 2021, World Rugby inducted Carling into its World Rugby Hall of Fame, alongside Osea Kolinisau, Humphrey Kayange, Huriana Manuel, Cheryl McAfee and Jim Telfer.

== Notes ==
Sporting positions
Preceded by Richard Harding; Rob Andrew; Rob Andrew	England national rugby union team captain November 1988 – March 1989; November 1989 – May 1995; June 1995 – March 1996	Succeeded by Rob Andrew; Rob Andrew; Phil de Glanville
