= Mark Linnett =

England international rugby union player

- Full name: Mark Stuart Linnett
- Born: 17 February 1963 (age 63) Rugby, Warwickshire, England
- Height: 5 ft 11 in (180 cm)
- Weight: 238 lb (108 kg)

Rugby union career
- Position: Prop
International career
Years	Team	Apps	(Points)
1989	England	1	(4)

Mark Stuart Linnett (born 17 February 1963) is an English former rugby union international.

Linnett, a policeman by profession, competed for Birmingham-based club Moseley. Other clubs represented include the Barbarians and Worcester. In 1989, Linnett was one of two new props called into the England team for a Test against Fiji at Twickenham, with Andy Mullins also making his debut. He scored a try in the second half of the 58–23 win.

== See also ==
- List of England national rugby union players
