= Alan Reynolds (cricketer) =

English cricketer and British Army officer

Personal information
- Full name: Alan Boyd Reynolds
- Born: 12 March 1879; Islington, Middlesex, England
- Died: 2 June 1940 (aged 61); Marylebone, London, England
- Batting: Right-handed
- Role: Wicket-keeper

Domestic team information
- Years: Team
- 1897–1906: Hertfordshire
- 1900: Oxford University
- 1903: Marylebone Cricket Club

Career statistics
Competition	First-class
Matches	4
Runs scored	34
Batting average	8.50
100s/50s	–/–
Top score	21
Catches/stumpings	–/–
- Source: Cricinfo, 7 July 2019

Alan Boyd Reynolds DSO (12 March 1879 – 2 June 1940) was an English first-class cricketer and British Army officer. Reynolds served in the 12th Royal Lancers from 1900 to 1934, seeing action in the Second Boer War and the First World War. He briefly commanded the 1/1st Northumberland Hussars in the latter stages of the First World War, being awarded the Distinguished Service Order while commanding the Hussars. He also played first-class cricket for the Gentlemen, the Marylebone Cricket Club, and Oxford University.

== First-class cricket and military career ==
The son of Sir Alfred Reynolds, he was born at Islington in March 1879. He was educated at Winchester College, whereas captain of the college cricket XI he greeted Queen Victoria on the occasion of her visit to Winchester College as part of her Diamond Jubilee celebrations. From Winchester he went up to New College, Oxford. While studying at Oxford, he made his debut in first-class cricket for Oxford University against Surrey at The Oval in 1900. He made two further first-class appearances in 1900, playing a further match for Oxford against the Marylebone Cricket Club (MCC) at Lord's, and appearing for the Gentlemen in the Gentlemen v Players fixture at The Oval. Two years later, he made a final first-class appearance for the MCC against Oxford University at Lord's in 1903. In addition to playing first-class cricket, Reynolds also played minor counties cricket for Hertfordshire, making seven appearances in the Minor Counties Championship between 1897 and 1906. After graduating from Oxford, he enlisted as a second lieutenant in the 12th Royal Lancers, serving shortly after in the Second Boer War, for which he was mentioned in dispatches. He was promoted to the rank of lieutenant in September 1902. He fell ill in November 1906 and was placed on half-pay, but had recovered by the following month. He was promoted to the rank of captain in August 1908. He was seconded for service as an adjutant in the Special Reserve in March 1914.

== World War I and later military career ==
He served in the First World War with the Lancers, during which he was promoted to the rank of major in December 1914. He was made a temporary lieutenant colonel in March 1916, before relinquishing the rank the following month. He took over command of the 1/1st Northumberland Hussars in March 1917, following the return of Colonel John Blencowe Cookson to England. While commanding the 1/1st Northumberland Hussars he was granted the temporary rank of lieutenant colonel. While commanding the 1/1st he saw action defending against the German offensive Operation Michael in March 1918. He founded 'Reynolds' Force' on 24 March, three days into the battle, consisting of 120 horses. 'Reynolds' Force' then joined up with other cavalry units, forming what became known as 'Harman's Detachment'. He was awarded the Distinguished Service Order in the 1919 Birthday Honours. His command of the 1/1st ended in October 1919, at which point he once more relinquished the temporary rank of lieutenant colonel and returned to the Lancers. He retired from active service prior to August 1934, holding the rank of lieutenant colonel. He died at Marylebone in June 1940.
