= 1991 Five Nations Championship =

Rugby union competition

- Date: 19 January - 16 March 1991
- Countries: England; Ireland; France; Scotland; Wales

Tournament statistics
- Champions: England (19th title)
- Grand Slam: England (9th title)
- Triple Crown: England (16th title)
- Matches played: 10
- Tries scored: 36 (3.6 per match)
- Top point scorer: (England) Simon Hodgkinson (60 points)
- Top try scorers: (England) Mike Teague (England) Rory Underwood (France) Franck Mesnel (France) Philippe Saint-André (France) Philippe Sella (Ireland) Simon Geoghegan (Ireland) Brendan Mullin (Scotland) Derek White (2 tries)

The 1991 Five Nations Championship was the 62nd series of the Five Nations Championship, an annual rugby union competition between the major Northern Hemisphere rugby union national teams. The tournament consisted of ten matches held between 19 January and 16 March 1991.

The tournament was the 62nd in its then format as the Five Nations. Including the competition's former incarnation as the Home Nations Championship, the 1991 Five Nations Championship was the 97th Northern Hemisphere rugby union championship.

The championship was contested by England, France, Ireland, Scotland and Wales. England won the tournament, achieving a final 21–19 victory over France to win the Grand Slam, their first since 1980 and ninth overall in the Five Nations. This was also their nineteenth outright victory, including five victories in the Home Nations, excluding ten titles shared with other countries. England also won the Triple Crown and Calcutta Cup as a result of their victories over the other Home Nations. France and Scotland placed second and third with three and two wins respectively, while Ireland and Wales placed fourth and fifth without achieving any victories; the fixture between the two teams resulted in a 21–21 draw.

It was also the fourth occasion, after 1978, 1984 and 1990, on which two teams each with three victories faced off against each other in the final round of matches, with both capable of completing a Grand Slam with a victory. France lost on their third attempt.

This edition was also famous for the try Philippe Saint-André scored in the last match of the tournament against England, which was later voted Twickenham's try of the century.

== Participants ==
The teams involved were:

Nation	Venue	City	Head coach	Captain
England	Twickenham	London	Geoff Cooke	Will Carling
France	Parc des Princes	Paris	Daniel Dubroca	Serge Blanco
Ireland	Lansdowne Road	Dublin	Ciaran Fitzgerald	Rob Saunders
Scotland	Murrayfield	Edinburgh	Jim Telfer	David Sole
Wales	National Stadium	Cardiff	Ron Waldron	Paul Thorburn

== Table ==
Pos	Team	Pld	W	D	L	PF	PA	PD	Pts
1	England	4	4	0	0	83	44	+39	8
2	France	4	3	0	1	91	46	+45	6
3	Scotland	4	2	0	2	81	73	+8	4
4	Ireland	4	0	1	3	66	86	−20	1
4	Wales	4	0	1	3	42	114	−72	1

== Results ==
1991-01-19

France	15–9	Scotland
Pen.: Camberabero (2); Drops: Blanco; Camberabero (2)		Pen.: Chalmers (2); Drops: Chalmers

Parc des Princes, Paris
Attendance: 48,990
Referee: E. F. Morrison (England)

1991-01-19

Wales	6–25	England
Pen.: N. Jenkins; Thorburn		Tries: Teague; Pen.: Hodgkinson (7)

National Stadium, Cardiff
Referee: R. J. Megson (Scotland)

1991-02-02

Ireland	13–21	France
Tries: S. Smith; Pen.: Kiernan (3)		Tries: Cabannes; Lagisquet; Con.: Camberabero (2); Pen.: Camberabero (3)

Lansdowne Road, Dublin
Attendance: 50,000
Referee: W. D. Bevan (Wales)

1991-02-02

Scotland	32–12	Wales
Tries: Armstrong; Chalmers; White (2); Con.: Chalmers; G. Hastings; Pen.: Chalmers; G. Hastings (2); Drops: Chalmers		Tries: Ford; Con.: Thorburn; Pen.: Thorburn (2)

Murrayfield, Edinburgh
Referee: D. J. Bishop (New Zealand)

1991-02-16

Wales	21–21	Ireland
Tries: Arnold; N. Jenkins; Con.: Thorburn (2); Pen.: Thorburn (2); Drops: N. Jenkins		Tries: Clarke; Geoghegan; Mullin; Staples; Con.: B. Smith; Drops: B. Smith

National Stadium, Cardiff
Referee: D. J. Bishop (New Zealand)

1991-02-16

England	21–12	Scotland
Tries: Heslop; Con.: Hodgkinson; Pen.: Hodgkinson (5)		Pen.: Chalmers (4)

Twickenham, London
Referee: S. R. Hilditch (Ireland)

1991-03-02

France	36–3	Wales
Tries: Blanco; Lafond; Mesnel; Roumat; Saint-André; Sella; Con.: Sella; Camberabero (2); Pen.: Camberabero (2)		Pen.: Thorburn

Parc des Princes, Paris
Attendance: 49,370
Referee: K. Fitzgerald (Australia)

1991-03-02

Ireland	7–16	England
Tries: Geoghegan; Pen.: B. Smith		Tries: Teague; R. Underwood; Con.: Hodgkinson; Pen.: Hodgkinson (2)

Lansdowne Road, Dublin
Referee: A. Ceccon (France)

1991-03-16

Scotland	28–25	Ireland
Tries: G. Hastings; S. Hastings; Stanger; Con.: Chalmers (2); Pen.: Chalmers (3); G. Hastings		Tries: Crossan; Geoghegan; Mullin; Robinson; Con.: B. Smith (3); Drops: B. Smith

Murrayfield, Edinburgh
Referee: K. Fitzgerald (Australia)

1991-03-16

England	21–19	France
Tries: R. Underwood; Con.: Hodgkinson; Pen.: Hodgkinson (4); Drops: Andrew		Tries: Camberabero; Mesnel; Saint-André; Con.: Camberabero (2); Pen.: Camberabero

Twickenham, London
Attendance: 61,000
Referee: L. J. Peard (Wales)
