= Theo Oosthuizen =

Namibia & South Africa international rugby union player

- Born: Lodewikus Theodorus Oosthuizen; 24 February 1964 (age 62) Mossel Bay, South Africa
- Height: 1.80 m (5 ft 11 in)
- Weight: 95 kg (209 lb)
- School: Albertinia High, Albertinia
- University: University of the Free State; Stellenbosch University

Rugby union career
- Position(s): Flanker, Number eight
Provincial / State sides
Years	Team	Apps	(Points)
1986–87, 92–93	Free State	36	
1988–89	South West Africa	43	
1994–96	Griqualand West	50	
International career
Years	Team	Apps	(Points)
1990	Namibia	7	(8)
1996	South Africa (tour)	4	(15)

Lodewikus Theodorus "Theo" Oosthuizen (born 24 February 1964) is a former rugby union player who represented both South Africa and Namibia. He never played in a test match for South Africa, but played in four tour matches. He did play seven test matches for Namibia.

== Rugby career ==
Oosthuizen made his senior provincial debut in for the Free State in 1986 while studying at the University of the Free State. He later moved to the then South West Africa, which at the time participated in the South African domestic rugby competitions. Oosthuizen made his debut for South West Africa in 1988 and after independence of Namibia in 1990, he played in Namibia's first test match on 24 March 1990 in Windhoek against Zimbabwe. In total, Oosthuizen played seven test matches for Namibia, scoring two tries.

In 1992 he returned to the Free State and in 1994 relocated to play for Griqualand West (now known as Griquas) at provincial level. There was talk that he was included in the 1996 South African touring team to Argentina and Europe on the basis of his friendship with then coach Andre Markgraaff, who was also involved with that particular provincial side.

After he stopped playing, he turned to coaching among others Griquas and the University of the Free State, before serving the Sharks as an assistant coach.

=== Test history (Namibia) ===
No.	Opposition	Result (Nam 1st)	Position	Tries	Date	Venue
1.	Zimbabwe	33–18	Number 8		24 Mar 1990	South West Stadium, Windhoek
2.	Portugal	86–9	Number 8	1	21 Apr 1990	South West Stadium, Windhoek
3.	Wales	9–18	Number 8		2 Jun 1990	South West Stadium, Windhoek
4.	Wales	30–34	Number 8		9 Jun 1990	South West Stadium, Windhoek
5.	France XV	15–24	Number 8		23 Jun 1990	South West Stadium, Windhoek
6.	France XV	21–25	Number 8		30 Jun 1990	South West Stadium, Windhoek
7.	Germany	54–7	Number 8	1	21 Jul 1990	South West Stadium, Windhoek

== See also ==
- List of South Africa national rugby union players – Springbok no. 646
