= Chris Bridges =

Wales international rugby union player

- Full name: Christopher Jeffrey Bridges
- Born: 31 August 1968 (age 58) Beddau, Wales
- Height: 5 ft 11 in (180 cm)
- Weight: 187 lb (85 kg)

Rugby union career
- Position: Scrum-half
International career
Years	Team	Apps	(Points)
1990–91	Wales	7	(4)

Christopher Jeffrey Bridges (born 31 August 1968) is a Welsh former rugby union international.

Born in Beddau, Bridges was a combative scrum-half who played his early rugby in a strong Neath side, where he came to after captaining Beddau Youth. He was named as man of the match in Neath's 1989 Schweppes Cup final win over Llanelli. During his career, he also played for Pontypool, Treorchy and Caerphilly.

Bridges was capped seven times for Wales. On the 1990 tour of Namibia, he scored a try late in his debut match which secured the win for Wales. He featured in three Tests during the 1991 Five Nations Championship and was on the 1991 tour of Australia, with the Test against the Wallabies at Ballymore Stadium his final cap.

== See also ==
- List of Wales national rugby union players
