= Alan Buzza =

English sportsman

Personal information
- Born: 3 March 1966 (age 60); Beverley, Yorkshire
- Source: Cricinfo, 11 April 2017

Alan Buzza (born 3 March 1966) is an English former cricketer and rugby union player. He played seventeen first-class matches for Cambridge University Cricket Club between 1989 and 1990. He also played professional rugby for Wasps and toured with the England rugby team in 1993 to Canada, though caps were not awarded for this tour. In 2026 the Rugby Football Union awarded caps to players who represented England in major internationals but were not capped at the time, including Buzza. He was in England's squad for the 1990 Five Nations but remained on the bench. He was appointed 'Head of Rugby' at the University of Loughborough at some point during 1994, however he left in 2019, he now is a cover teacher for Westcountry School Trust in Devon.

== See also ==
- List of Cambridge University Cricket Club players
