= Alan Reynolds (rugby union) =

- Full name: Alan David Reynolds
- Born: 24 January 1966 (age 60) Carmarthen, Wales
- Height: 6 ft 1 in (185 cm)
- Weight: 210 lb (95 kg)

Rugby union career
- Position: Flanker
International career
Years	Team	Apps	(Points)
1990–92	Wales	3	(0)

Alan David Reynolds (born 24 January 1966) is a Welsh former rugby union international.

Born in Carmarthen, Reynolds is known as "Santa", a nickname which came about because his parents owned the Santa Clara Pub in St Clears. He played his early rugby with Whitland RFC.

Reynolds, a flanker, spent most of his career with Swansea RFC and earned three caps for Wales. He was capped twice on the 1990 tour of Namibia and played against Australia at Cardiff in 1992.

== See also ==
- List of Wales national rugby union players
