= Alan Reynolds (artist) =

- Born: 27 April 1926; Newmarket, Suffolk, England
- Died: 28 August 2014 (aged 88); Hurstpierpoint, Sussex, England
- Education: Woolwich Polytechnic; Royal College of Art
- Known for: landscape; abstract

Alan Munro Reynolds (27 April 1926 – 28 August 2014) was a British painter.

Reynolds was born on 27 April 1926 at Newmarket, Suffolk, where his father worked as a stableman. He studied at the Woolwich Polytechnic from 1948 to 1952 and in 1954, and at the Royal College of Art from 1952 to 1953. He taught at the Central School of Art and Design from 1954 to 1961, and from 1961 or 1962 at Saint Martin's School of Art, where he became a senior lecturer in painting in 1985. His work is in the permanent collections of the Museum of Modern Art, New York, the National Museum of Canada, the V&A and the Tate among others. He was known first as a landscape painter, but changed to a totally abstract style from 1960. He lived and worked in Kent.
