= Paul Knight =

Wales international rugby union player

- Born: 30 April 1959 (age 67) Trealaw, Wales

Rugby union career
- Position: Prop
International career
Years	Team	Apps	(Points)
1990–91	Wales	5	(0)

Paul Knight (born 30 April 1959) is a Welsh former rugby union international.

Knight, born in Trealaw, was a tighthead prop who played for Aberavon, Pontypridd and Treorchy. In 1982, he was in the West of Wales team that faced Australia at Stradey Park. He gained five Wales caps during his career, starting with two Test appearances on Wales' 1990 Namibia tour, then was capped in a match against the Barbarians later that year. In the 1991 Five Nations, he played in the first two matches, before losing his place to Neath prop John Davies.

While with Treorchy in 1995, Knight was diagnosed with multiple sclerosis, forcing him to retire from the sport. He uses a wheelchair and lives in an adapted home with wife Jennifer. His story was documented in a biography titled The Paul Knight Story in 2023.

== See also ==
- List of Wales national rugby union players
