= Alun Carter =

Wales international rugby union player

- Full name: Alun Jonathan Carter
- Born: 13 December 1964 Malpas, Newport, Wales
- Died: August 2024 (aged 59)

Rugby union career
- Position: Flanker
International career
Years	Team	Apps	(Points)
1991	Wales	2	(0)

Alun Jonathan Carter (13 December 1964 – August 2024) was a Welsh rugby union analyst and international player.

Born in Malpas, Newport, Carter was an adoptee and lived as a young child in West Germany, where his father had a job teaching children of British Forces personnel. The family moved to Staffordshire on return to England, before settling in the Pontypool area when Carter was 14. He finished his education at West Monmouth School and Kelly College.

Carter, a back row forward, played for Pontypool RFC during the 1980s, under the coaching of Ray Prosser. He worked at the time as a policeman in Cwmbran and was capped for Wales B on a tour of Italy.

Following a season with French club Millau-Stade Olympique, Carter was signed by Newport RFC in 1990 and soon after had impressed enough to get a Wales call up for the 1991 Five Nations Championship, to fill the position of flanker. He featured in the Test matches against England at Cardiff and Scotland at Murrayfield.

Carter was Welsh Rugby Union's Head Analyst from 1998 to 2007. His stint included Wales' drought-breaking Six Nations grand slam triumph in 2005. He also served as team manager of the Worcester Warriors.

His death was announced on 4 August 2024. He was 59.

== See also ==
- List of Wales national rugby union players
