= Ken Waters =

- Full name: Kenneth Ivor Charles Waters
- Born: 9 October 1961 (age 65) Cwmbran, Wales

Rugby union career
- Position: Hooker
International career
Years	Team	Apps	(Points)
1991	Wales	1	(0)

Kenneth Ivor Charles Waters (born 9 October 1961) is a Welsh former rugby union international player.

== Rugby union career ==
Born in Cwmbran, Waters played for Newbridge RFC and was an uncapped member of the 1991 Wales rugby union tour of Australia. His only international cap came at the 1991 Rugby World Cup, as the starting hooker in Wales' opening pool match against Western Samoa, in which they suffered an unexpected loss. He lost his place to Garin Jenkins and spent the rest of the tournament on the bench.

== Personal life ==
Waters is a former officer with Gwent Police.

In 2017, Waters was diagnosed with motor neurone disease.

== See also ==
- List of Wales national rugby union players
