= Jeremy Pugh =

Wales international rugby union footballer

- Full name: Jeremy David Pugh
- Born: 4 March 1960 (age 66) Builth Wells, Powys, Wales

Rugby union career
- Position: Prop
International career
Years	Team	Apps	(Points)
1987–1990	Wales	3	(0)
- Correct as of 9 October 2018

Jeremy David Pugh (born 4 March 1960) is a former international rugby union player. He played for the Wales national rugby union team in the late 1980s.

Pugh played his club rugby for Neath. He first played for Wales in 1987 against the USA. Altogether he won three caps. He played his last international match against Scotland on 3 March 1990.

In 2006 Pugh was one of three former international rugby players to climb Mount Kilimanjaro to raise money for the NSPCC.

== Other activities ==
Pugh later became a property developer in Builth Wells.

=== Political career ===
Pugh stood as a candidate for the Abolish the Welsh Assembly Party at the 2016 Welsh Assembly election, heading the party list in the Mid and West Wales region. While campaigning, he pledged to give away half of his salary if elected. Abolish the Welsh Assembly polled 5% of the regional vote in Mid and West Wales, and failed to win any seats.

At the 2017 local elections, Pugh was elected to Powys County Council as an independent councillor for the Builth Wells ward, receiving 53.5% of all votes cast.

Pugh ran again for Abolish the Welsh Assembly at the 2021 Senedd election, being the third-placed candidate on the regional list for Mid and West Wales. The party were again unsuccessful in winning seats, having polled just 3% of the regional vote.

Pugh was re-elected as a councillor at the 2022 local elections.
