= Jaco Coetzee (rugby union, born 1970) =

Namibia international rugby union player

- Full name: D. Jaco Coetzee
- Born: 9 February 1970 (age 56) South West Africa

Rugby union career
- Position: Fullback/fly-half
Senior career
Years	Team	Apps	(Points)
1999	North West	–	(–)
International career
Years	Team	Apps	(Points)
1990–1995	Namibia	28	(335)

D. Jaco Coetzee (born 9 February 1970) is a Namibian former rugby union player. He has the record for the second most points in Namibian rugby union history.

== Career ==
=== Club ===
He played for North West in the 1999 Vodacom Cup.

=== International career ===
He made his debut for Namibia in 1990, coming off the bench in a win over Portugal. In June 1991 he started at flyhalf in two historic wins over Italy in 1991, scoring 26 points in the two matches. Later that year in July he once again featured at flyhalf in two more historic wins over Ireland.

His final appearances came in September 1995 in a victory over Zimbabwe in Harare.

=== Records ===
- Namibia 2nd all-time points scorer, 335 points in 28 appearances (6 tries, 81 conversions, 45 penalties, 33 drop goals)
- Namibia 2nd all-time record for points scored in a single match, v Kenya 7 July 1993, 30 points (3 tries, 6 conversions, 1 penalty)
- Tier 3 4th all-time record point scorer.

== Statistics ==
Test Statistics
Year	Apps	Tries	Con	Pen	DG	Pts
1990	5	0	8	3	1	28
1991	11	1	34	20	1	134
1992	2	1	10	0	0	25
1993	4	4	21	7	0	83
1994	4	0	4	9	0	35
1995	2	0	4	6	1	29
Total	28	6	81	45	3	335
