= Rowland Phillips (rugby) =

GB & Wales dual-code rugby international footballer

- Born: Rowland David Phillips; 28 July 1965 (age 61) St Davids, Pembrokeshire, Wales
- Height: 6 ft 2 in (1.88 m)
- Weight: 17 st 7 lb (111 kg)
- School: St David's Comprehensive
- Notable relative: Carys Phillips (daughter)

Rugby union career
- Position: back-row
Amateur team(s)
Years	Team	Apps	(Points)
- Neath RFC
International career
Years	Team	Apps	(Points)
1987–1990	Wales	10	(0)
Coaching career
- Years: Team
- 2015–: London Welsh
- Rugby league career

Playing information
- Position: Second-row, Prop
Club
Years	Team	Pld	T	G	FG	P
1990–94	Warrington	50	6			12
1992 (loan)	→Rochdale Hornets	4	3			12
1992 (loan)	→Oldham RLFC	9	0			0
1994–97	Workington Town	86	9			36
	Total	149	18	0	0	60
Representative
Years	Team	Pld	T	G	FG	P
1993–95	Wales	14	2			8
1996	Great Britain	1				0

Rowland David Phillips (born 28 July 1965) is a Welsh former rugby union and rugby league footballer.

== Background ==
Phillips was born in St Davids, Wales.

== Playing career ==
He played as a back row forward for Wales, where he won ten caps between 1987 and 1990. He also played rugby union for Neath RFC before moving to rugby league, playing second-row for Warrington, Oldham RLFC and Workington Town.

Rowland Phillips appeared as a substitute (replacing Prop Neil Harmon on 79-minutes) in Warrington's 12–2 victory over Bradford Northern in the 1990–91 Regal Trophy Final during the 1990–91 season at Headingley, Leeds on Saturday, 12 January 1991.

He also played for the Wales and Great Britain national rugby league teams.

Rowland Phillips made his début for Warrington on Saturday 13 October 1990, and he played his last match for Warrington on Sunday 21 August 1994.

== Coaching career ==
In 2003 he took over as coach of Neath RFC from Lyn Jones. Due to his success at the club he is regarded as a local hero, leading Neath RFC to four Premiership titles in successive years and three cup final wins.

In the Summer of 2009 he joined Ebbw Vale RFC as head coach. After an unsuccessful season which saw Ebbw Vale relegated, he joined new Italian rugby team Aironi, originally as a defence coach, a position he previously filled with the Ospreys and Wales. He became Head Coach on 7 November 2010 after Franco Bernini was sacked after not winning any of their games up to that point.

In July 2012 Phillips was appointed head coach of Italian club Viadana. In June 2014 Phillips was appointed Director of Rugby for Welsh club Neath RFC; he left later when appointed manager of London Welsh.
