= Alan Edmunds =

Wales international rugby union player

- Full name: David Alan Edmunds
- Born: 8 October 1961 (age 65) Neath, Wales
- Height: 5 ft 11 in (180 cm)

Rugby union career
- Position: Wing
International career
Years	Team	Apps	(Points)
1990	Wales	2	(0)

David Alan Edmunds (born 8 October 1961) is a Welsh former rugby union international.

A Neath Grammar School product, Edmunds competed for Neath RFC and scored a try against the touring 1989 All Blacks, which was one of 45 tries he scored with Neath in the 1988/89 season.

Edmunds, a winger, earned a Wales cap in the 1990 Five Nations Championship, coming off the bench against Ireland at Lansdowne Road. He also featured in a match for Wales against the Barbarians that year.

== See also ==
- List of Wales national rugby union players
