= Rory Underwood =

English rugby union player (born 1963)

- Born: 19 June 1963 (age 63) Middlesbrough, England
- Height: 5 ft 8 in (1.73 m)
- Weight: 13 st 8 lb (86 kg)
- School: Barnard Castle School
- Notable relative: Tony Underwood (brother)
- Occupation(s): RAF aviator, management consultant

Rugby union career
- Position: Wing
Senior career
Years	Team	Apps	(Points)
1983–1997	Leicester Tigers	236	(670)
1997–1998	Bedford Blues		
International career
Years	Team	Apps	(Points)
1984–1996	England	85	(210)
1989–1993	British and Irish Lions	6	(5)

Rory Underwood, MBE, DL (born 19 June 1963) is an English former rugby union player. He is England's men's record international try scorer, with 49 tries in 85 internationals between 1984 and 1996. Underwood's principal position was wing and he played 236 games for Leicester Tigers between 1983 and 1997, he also played for Middlesbrough, Bedford Blues and the Royal Air Force. Underwood toured with the British and Irish Lions in 1989 and 1993 playing in six tests and scoring one try. In 1992 Underwood played for England alongside his younger brother Tony Underwood, becoming the first brothers to play together for England since 1937.

Playing during the amateur era his profession was as a Royal Air Force pilot.

== Early life ==
Underwood was born in Middlesbrough, England, of Chinese-English parentage. His father was a Yorkshire engineer who worked in Malaysia where he met and married Underwood's Chinese-Malaysian mother.

Underwood was educated at Barnard Castle School (with fellow rugby international Rob Andrew), followed by initial officer training at RAF College Cranwell.

Underwood's early life was spent in Malaysia. His family moved to Yorkshire in 1976, but his father was posted to Singapore and did not rejoin the family for another three years.

== Royal Air Force ==
In the Royal Air Force (RAF), Underwood played for the Strike Command and main RAF rugby team. As flying officer he flew with No. 360 Squadron RAF, an electronic countermeasures training squadron, on Canberras at RAF Wyton in Cambridgeshire. He then flew the Canberra TT18 with No. 100 Squadron RAF, also at Wyton.

Underwood took a ground-instruction job in 1995 at RAF Cranwell, becoming a flight lieutenant, while playing for Leicester. He became station flight safety officer, then joined No. 55 Squadron RAF (navigator training, now referred to as a weapon systems officer) on the twin-engined Dominie (British Aerospace 125), and continued in the RAF until 1999, although he could have stayed until 2001.

== Rugby ==
Having first played as a youngster at Middlesbrough Rugby Club (with Rob Andrew and Bernie Coyne), Underwood went on to become one of the greatest wings in rugby union. Underwood is the leading try scorer for England in international matches. He first played for England in February 1984 against Ireland at Twickenham. He won 85 England and 6 Lions caps between 1984 and 1996 (then an English record, later surpassed by Jason Leonard – it remained the highest total for an English back, though that has since been overtaken by Jonny Wilkinson), scoring a record 49 tries for England, and 1 for the British Lions, making him one of the leading try scorers of all time. He played for England in the Rugby World Cups of 1987, 1991 and 1995.

Underwood was capable of playing on either right or left wing depending on who was selected on the opposite side. More usually seen on the left wearing shirt number 11, in 1988 he switched to the right (and shirt number 14) to accommodate Chris Oti: in 1990 on the right opposite Mark Bailey, but on the left when partnering Simon Halliday, continuing on the left in 1991 opposite Nigel Heslop: in the 1991 World Cup he played on the right in partnership with Oti early on, then on the left in partnership with Heslop until the quarter-final and Halliday for the final two rounds, an arrangement that persisted throughout the 1992 Five Nations championship – which was initially billed as his final season before retirement, Underwood scoring tries in each of the first three matches of the championship, and coming close to scoring against Wales. However, Underwood changed his mind and opted to carry on, initially for the next match against South Africa (their first match since their readmission to international sport), and eventually for several more years – playing mostly now on the left, to accommodate his younger brother, Tony, on the right wing. They were the first brothers to represent England at the same time since 1937: and, in the 1993 match against Scotland, the first pair of brothers to score tries in the same match for England. He has been described as one of the greatest wingers to ever play the game.

== Recent career ==
Underwood has worked as a management consultant. When leaving the RAF he planned on setting up a company called Teamwork with his friend John Peters. He planned on acquiring a Commercial Pilot Licence.

Underwood set up UPH, a management and teamwork training company, with John Peters and Martyn Helliwell on 20 May 1999. Two years later, he appeared on Lily Savage's Blankety Blank.

Like John Peters, Underwood is also a motivational speaker. He held a role as a non-executive director on the board of Leicester Tigers F.C, but left this role in November 2020. His new company is called Wingman Ltd.

== International tries ==
Try	Opposing team	Location	Venue	Competition	Date	Result
1	France	Paris, France	Parc des Princes	Five Nations Championship	3 March 1984	lost
2	Ireland	Dublin, Ireland	Lansdowne Road	Five Nations Championship	30 March 1985	lost
3	Japan	Sydney, Australia	Concord Oval	Rugby World Cup	30 May 1987	won
4	Japan	Sydney, Australia	Concord Oval	Rugby World Cup	30 May 1987	won
5	Ireland	Twickenham, England	Twickenham	Five Nations Championship	19 March 1988	won
6	Ireland	Twickenham, England	Twickenham	Five Nations Championship	19 March 1988	won
7	Ireland	Dublin, Ireland	Lansdowne Road	Millennium Trophy Match	23 April 1988	won
8	Australia	Brisbane, Australia	Ballymore Stadium	Summer Tour	29 May 1988	lost
9	Australia	Sydney, Australia	Concord Oval	Summer Tour	12 June 1988	lost
10	Fiji	Suva, Fiji	National Stadium, Suva	Summer Tour	16 June 1988	won
11	Fiji	Suva, Fiji	National Stadium, Suva	Summer Tour	16 June 1988	won
12	Australia	Twickenham, England	Twickenham	Autumn Internationals	5 November 1988	won
13	Australia	Twickenham, England	Twickenham	Autumn Internationals	5 November 1988	won
14	Fiji	Twickenham, England	Twickenham	Autumn Internationals	4 November 1989	won
15	Fiji	Twickenham, England	Twickenham	Autumn Internationals	4 November 1989	won
16	Fiji	Twickenham, England	Twickenham	Autumn Internationals	4 November 1989	won
17	Fiji	Twickenham, England	Twickenham	Autumn Internationals	4 November 1989	won
18	Fiji	Twickenham, England	Twickenham	Autumn Internationals	4 November 1989	won
19	Ireland	Twickenham, England	Twickenham	Five Nations Championship	20 January 1990	won
20	France	Paris, France	Parc des Princes	Five Nations Championship	3 February 1990	won
21	Wales	Twickenham, England	Twickenham	Five Nations Championship	17 February 1990	won
22	Wales	Twickenham, England	Twickenham	Five Nations Championship	17 February 1990	won
23	Argentina	Twickenham, England	Twickenham	Autumn Internationals	3 November 1990	won
24	Argentina	Twickenham, England	Twickenham	Autumn Internationals	3 November 1990	won
25	Argentina	Twickenham, England	Twickenham	Autumn Internationals	3 November 1990	won
26	Ireland	Dublin, Ireland	Lansdowne Road	Five Nations Championship	2 March 1991	won
27	France	Twickenham, England	Twickenham	Five Nations Championship	16 March 1991	won
28	Fiji	Suva, Fiji	National Stadium, Suva	Summer Tour	20 July 1991	won
29	Italy	Twickenham, England	Twickenham	Rugby World Cup	8 October 1991	won
30	United States	Twickenham, England	Twickenham	Rugby World Cup	11 October 1991	won
31	United States	Twickenham, England	Twickenham	Rugby World Cup	11 October 1991	won
32	France	Paris, France	Parc des Princes	Rugby World Cup	19 October 1991	won
33	Scotland	Edinburgh, Scotland	Murrayfield	Five Nations Championship	18 January 1992	won
34	Ireland	Twickenham, England	Twickenham	Five Nations Championship	1 February 1992	won
35	France	Paris, France	Parc des Princes	Five Nations Championship	15 February 1992	won
36	Scotland	Twickenham, England	Twickenham	Five Nations Championship	6 March 1993	won
37	New Zealand	Wellington, New Zealand	Athletic Park	British Lions tour to New Zealand	26 June 1993	won
38	Wales	Twickenham, England	Twickenham	Five Nations Championship	19 March 1994	won
39	Romania	Twickenham, England	Twickenham	Autumn Internationals	12 November 1994	won
40	Canada	Twickenham, England	Twickenham	Autumn Internationals	10 December 1994	won
41	Canada	Twickenham, England	Twickenham	Autumn Internationals	10 December 1994	won
42	Wales	Cardiff, Wales	Cardiff Arms Park	Five Nations Championship	18 February 1995	won
43	Wales	Cardiff, Wales	Cardiff Arms Park	Five Nations Championship	18 February 1995	won
44	Italy	Durban, South Africa	Kings Park Stadium	Rugby World Cup	31 May 1995	won
45	Western Samoa	Durban, South Africa	Kings Park Stadium	Rugby World Cup	4 June 1995	won
46	Western Samoa	Durban, South Africa	Kings Park Stadium	Rugby World Cup	4 June 1995	won
47	New Zealand	Cape Town, South Africa	Newlands Stadium	Rugby World Cup	18 June 1995	lost
48	New Zealand	Cape Town, South Africa	Newlands Stadium	Rugby World Cup	18 June 1995	lost
49	Western Samoa	Twickenham, England	Twickenham	Autumn Internationals	16 December 1995	won
50	Wales	Twickenham, England	Twickenham	Five Nations Championship	3 February 1996	won

== Personal life ==
Underwood's wife was an air traffic controller in the RAF. He has two daughters. He has two younger brothers, Gary and Tony, and also has a sister, Wendy. His brother Tony Underwood became a commercial pilot after retiring and also played rugby for England and has two daughters.

Underwood's long-lasting relationship with the RAF was put under strain when his wife was unfairly dismissed from the RAF for being pregnant, for which she received an undisclosed sum after settling out of court in 1995.

Underwood lives in a small village near Grantham in Lincolnshire, having lived in the area for many years whilst at Cranwell. He has often been invited to be a local dignitary, or to play for local charity sports matches. He is President of the Grantham National Malaya and Borneo Veterans Association.

== Publications ==
- Flying Wing – An Autobiography by Rory Underwood, 1992, ISBN 0-09-175074-1

== See also ==
- List of leading rugby union test try scorers
- List of top English points scorers and try scorers
- List of rugby union test caps leaders
