= Mark Ring =

Wales international rugby union player

- Born: Mark Gerarde Ring; 15 October 1962 (age 64) Cardiff, Wales
- School: Lady Mary High School, Cardiff
- Occupation: Care worker

Rugby union career
- Position: Centre
Amateur team(s)
Years	Team	Apps	(Points)
1980-1996	Cardiff RFC	253	(677)
–	Pontypool RFC		
1984-1991	Barbarian F.C.	8	(53)
International career
Years	Team	Apps	(Points)
1983–1991	Wales	32	(34)

Mark Gerarde Ring (born 15 October 1962) played rugby union for Cardiff, Pontypool and Wales between 1982 and 1996. He was regarded as among the most gifted players of his generation but his career was hampered by serious injury.

== Club career ==
A great entertainer, Ring was noted for his cheek, flair and individual skill. He first came to attention as outside half for the Cardiff RFC Youth team where he gained selection for Wales Youth, scoring a try on debut v England. He made his senior debut as an 18-year-old during his Youth season against Cote Des Basques in Biarritz for whom Serge Blanco scored three tries. Ring played in three Welsh Cup Final victories and was a member of the Cardiff team that defeated the touring Australian side in 1984. Ring also spent several seasons at Pontypool, where he played alongside David Bishop at half-back during the 1987–88 season. He returned to Pontypool in 1992. He was a Club Championship winner for both Cardiff and Pontypool. He played more than 250 games for Cardiff and scored 94 tries and 677 points.

== International career ==
Ring made his Senior Wales debut against England as a 20-year-old and went on to gain 32 International Caps between 1983 and 1991. In 1988, Ring was part of the Wales team that won the Triple Crown. The majority of his caps were won at centre, but he played at outside half during the 1991 World Cup.

He played in two World Cups (1987 and 1991) Wales finished third in 1987 but failed to qualify from their group in 1991, having been defeated by Western Samoa. Ring played two Test Matches for The Barbarians losing against the 1988 Australians and defeating the 1990 Argentinian Touring Team where he formed a Centre partnership with New Zealand Centre Craig Innes. Ring was selected for two World XV Touring Squads, one to celebrate the Western Province Centenary in 1983 and the other to celebrate the South African Rugby Board's Centenary in 1989. He captained Wales on two occasions when Wales toured Namibia in 1990, though not in any of the Tests. Ring was Wales' Rugby Writers Player of the Year in 1985.

== Coaching career ==
Mark Ring ended his top flight club career in 1996 after the first Heineken Cup Final, when Cardiff were beaten by Stade Toulousain. He moved into coaching, first at West Hartlepool as Player/Director of Rugby and then moved on to a similar role at Penzance and Newlyn Pirates. He later moved back to Cardiff where he was an attached coach under former playing colleague David Young. Whilst still employed as a Development Officer with Cardiff's Capital Rugby Scheme he moved to Caerphilly, where he worked under Terry Holmes and alongside Tony Faulkener. Following Holmes' departure, Ring became head coach of Caerphilly and led the club to the third-tier European final at the Madejski Stadium, where they lost to Castres Olympique. He later moved to Ireland to coach a feeder team for Munster called Old Crescent in AIL Division 2. Ring subsequently returned to Wales and coached Tetbury RFC in Gloucestershire Division Two as well as the University of Glamorgan team in Treforest. He then spent four seasons at Welsh Premier Division side Cross Keys who went on to defeat Pontypridd in the Welsh Cup Final the week after being defeated by Munster 'A' in the final of the British & Irish Cup in Cork. He later came back to his home town Club as Attack coach at Cardiff and as an attached coach at the Blues under former playing colleague Phil Davies. He currently coaches Old Illtydians RFC in Division 3 East Central of WRU's Swalec League.

== Personal life ==
After working as a civil servant, a roofing contractor, labourer and a sales representative, Ring began a new career as a care worker in March 2020.
