= Andy Allen (rugby union) =

Welsh rugby player (born 1967)

- Born: Andrew George Allen; 5 April 1967 (age 59) Newport, Wales
- Height: 1.93 m (6 ft 4 in)
- Weight: 114 kg (17 st 13 lb)
- Notable relative: Morgan Allen

Rugby union career
- Position: Lock
- Current team: Retired
Senior career
Years	Team	Apps	(Points)
1985–88	Cwmbran		
1988–91	Newbridge		
1991–93	Newport	25	(9)
1993–95	Ebbw Vale		
International career
Years	Team	Apps	(Points)
- Wales Youth
- Wales U23
- Wales B
1990	Wales	3	(0)
1990	Barbarians	1	(4)

Andrew George Allen (born 5 April 1967) is a former Welsh international rugby union player.

Allen was born in Newport), and played three times for Wales in 1990 as a Lock.
