= Andy Mullins (rugby union) =

England international rugby union player

- Born: Andrew Richard Mullins; 12 December 1964 (age 61) Eltham, Greenwich, England
- School: Dulwich College
- University: Durham University

Rugby union career
- Position: Prop
Senior career
Years	Team	Apps	(Points)
- Harlequin FC
International career
Years	Team	Apps	(Points)
1989	England	1	(0)

Andrew Richard Mullins (born 1964) is an English former rugby union player. Mullins represented Harlequin FC and won a single cap for England in 1989.

== Early life ==
Andy Mullins was born on 12 December 1964 in Eltham. He was educated at Dulwich College and Durham University, where he was a member of Hatfield College. He spent a year between school and university in the British Army.

== Rugby union career ==
Mullins was selected for England B against Australia in 1988, part of the latter teams European tour. He made his international debut on 4 November 1989 at Twickenham in the England vs Fiji match. He was on the winning side.
