= Glyn Llewellyn =

Wales international rugby union player

- Full name: Glyn David Llewellyn
- Born: 9 August 1965 (age 61) Bradford-on-Avon, Wiltshire, England
- Height: 6 ft 6 in (198 cm)
- Weight: 246 lb (112 kg)
- Notable relative: Gareth Llewellyn (brother)

Rugby union career
- Position: Lock
International career
Years	Team	Apps	(Points)
1990–91	Wales	9	(0)

Glyn David Llewellyn (born 9 August 1965) is a Welsh former rugby union international.

Llewellyn was born in England but raised in South Wales. A lock, he earned nine caps for Wales, debuting on the 1990 tour of Namibia. He featured in the entire 1991 Five Nations campaign for Wales, then later that year toured Australia and played against the Wallabies in Brisbane. One of his Wales teammates, Gareth Llewellyn, is his younger brother. He played for Neath at club level and also spent some time in England, with Harlequins and the Wasps.

== See also ==
- List of Wales national rugby union players
