= Simon Geoghegan =

Irish rugby union player

- Born: Simon Patrick Geoghegan; 1 September 1968 (age 58) Knebworth, Hertfordshire
- Height: 1.83 m (6 ft 0 in)
- Weight: 83 kg (13 st 1 lb)
- Occupation: Solicitor

Rugby union career
- Position: Wing
Senior career
Years	Team	Apps	(Points)
1988–1994	London Irish	22	(25)
1994–1997	Bath		
Provincial / State sides
Years	Team	Apps	(Points)
1990-1992	Connacht		
1992-1996	Exiles		
International career
Years	Team	Apps	(Points)
1991–1996	Ireland	37	(51)

Simon Patrick Geoghegan (born 1 September 1968) is an Irish former rugby union player who played at wing in England for London Irish and Bath and in the Irish Inter-provincial Championships for Connacht Rugby and the Irish Exiles. He finished his rugby career at Bath Rugby where a debilitating toe injury limited his appearances and finally ended his playing career.

== Club career ==
A rugby union wing renowned for his speed, agility, and electrifying sidesteps, and sometimes nicknamed the "blond bomber" due to his fair hair, Geoghegan was reportedly timed at around 10.5 seconds for the 100 metres. He played as a forward initially before moving to the wing around the age of 18 years-old.

He joined London Irish as a teenager in 1988 with the aim of playing for their under-21 side, but following a trial he went straight into the senior team, and scored a try on debut.

He joined Bath Rugby from London Irish in 1994. He had nine operations on his feet during his career, after being diagnosed with arthritis in his toes at the age of 25. He was forced to retire from rugby before his thirtieth birthday.

== International career ==
He played for Ireland at under-21 and 'B' level. He made his senior Ireland debut in the Five Nations' Championship in 1991 again France and went on to score tries against Wales, England and Scotland in the Championship, and later won the Rugby Writers of Ireland player of the year award. However, he played in an era of struggle for Irish Rugby and was left stranded on the wing during the 1992 Championship, hardly receiving a meaningful pass. His critical comments after a match in 1993 led to a temporary suspension from the Irish team.

He is perhaps best known for his try in the 1994 Five Nations match against England at Twickenham, that was instrumental in a famous 13–12 win. Another key contribution during the match was a kick, chase and tackle on England fly-half Rob Andrew which led to a crucial kickable penalty to Ireland. An adept side stepper, he was once described by the commentator Bill McLaren as being like “a mad octopus” and “as quick as a trout up a burn”. He represented Ireland at the 1991 and 1995 Rugby Union World Cup.

Geoghegan was controversially left out of the 1993 British and Irish Lions tour to New Zealand when England's Ian Hunter and Tony Underwood were taken ahead of him. Former New Zealand hooker and Geoghegan's then London Irish coach Hika Reid was quoted at the time as being surprised as he felt the conditions would have suited him. In 1997 the Lions management apparently held a place open for him until the last possible minute, even though he had played little rugby that year due to the toe problems that cut short his career.

== Personal life ==
Born in England, he was educated at St Edmund's College, Hertfordshire. He has twin older sisters, one a civil engineer, the other a town planner. Geoghegan qualified to play for Ireland through his Galway-born father Patrick, from Killimor, who worked as a property developer. He was quoted as saying that "I have a great affinity with Ireland, I've spent a lot of time there. I've never thought of playing for anyone else." His grandfather played in the 1929 All-Ireland Hurling Final.

As an amateur player, Geoghegan had a career outside rugby as a solicitor. He studied for his law degree at London University. As of 2011, he was working in London at Rosling King LLP having joined the company as a paralegal in 1990 and became a partner in 2000. He married Reema and they have three daughters: Isobel, Gabrielle, and Phoebe.
