= Chris Gray (rugby union) =

Scotland international rugby union player

- Born: Christopher Antony Gray; 11 July 1960 (age 66) Haddington, East Lothian, Scotland
- Occupation: Dentist

Rugby union career
- Position: Lock
Amateur team(s)
Years	Team	Apps	(Points)
1976–1978	Edinburgh Academical		
1983–1997	Nottingham RFC	243	(60)
Provincial / State sides
Years	Team	Apps	(Points)
- Anglo-Scots
International career
Years	Team	Apps	(Points)
1989–1991	Scotland	22	(12)

Christopher Antony Gray (born 11 July 1960 in Haddington, East Lothian) is a former Scottish international rugby player who played most of his club rugby in England. He gained 22 caps for Scotland national rugby union team including five appearances at the 1991 Rugby World Cup. He is qualified as a dentist and helps coach at the school Trent College in Long Eaton.

== Club career ==
Between 1978 and 1983, Gray turned out for Edinburgh Academical. In 1983 he joined Nottingham R.F.C., and played 243 matches for the Green and Whites (scoring 60 points) until retiring in 1997. He succeeded England and British Lions hooker Brian Moore as club captain in 1989.

He held the record of 27 appearances for the Scottish Exiles provincial side, until it was equalled by Richard Cramb in 1992.

== International career ==
Gray made his Scotland debut in the 23-7 Five Nations win against Wales at Murrayfield on 21 January 1989 and was part of the Scotland team that claimed a grand slam in the 1990 Five Nations Championship. He played his last international in the 13-6 World Cup Third-place play-off defeat against New Zealand at Cardiff Arms Park on 30 October 1991.

== Dental career ==
Gray qualified from the Edinburgh Dental School in 1983 and moved to Nottingham to take up employment as a dentist. He worked as a dentist throughout his playing career. He is currently the owner of Wollaton Dental Care in Nottingham.

== Personal life ==
Gray married Nottingham RFC physiotherapist Judith Bunten in 1991. They have two sons: James Christopher Gray (b. 1991), who was invited to play for the Scottish Exiles under-19s side in the spring of 2010, and Nicholas Andrew Gray (b. 1995). Jamie's birth occurred towards the end of Scotland's 1991 World Cup campaign.

He stands at 6"5'. He continues to help coach the school Trent College, where both his sons went.
