= Arthur Emyr =

Wales international rugby union footballer & Welsh-language broadcaster

Arthur Emyr Jones (born 27 July 1962), usually known as Arthur Emyr, is a former Wales rugby union international. A winger, he played club rugby for Swansea RFC where he remains the club's all-time record try-scorer with 155 tries in 212 games and also for Cardiff RFC where he played 5 games and scored 4 tries. He also gained a Senior Wales Athletics vest. He also played for David Hughes Rugby First XV, Menai Bridge Rugby Club and Aberystwyth University.

Emyr was born in Bangor, Gwynedd. He attained 13 caps for Wales scoring 4 tries between 1989 and 1991. He was the 1990 Welsh Player of the Year. He was selected for the Wales squad for the 1991 Rugby World Cup.

After retiring from playing he developed a successful media career, initially as a television sports presenter then as Head of Sport at BBC Wales between 1994 and 2001, before joining the Welsh Government as Head of Major Events.
