= Allan Bateman =

Former GB & Wales dual-code rugby international footballer

Personal information
- Born: Allan Glen Bateman; 6 March 1965 (age 60) Caerau, Maesteg, Wales

Playing information
- Height: 5 ft 9 in (1.75 m)
- Weight: 13 st 0 lb (83 kg)

Rugby union
- Position: Centre
Club
Years	Team	Pld	T	G	FG	P
1985–89	Maesteg RFC
1989–90	Neath RFC
1997–99	Richmond
1999–01	Northampton
2001–03	Neath RFC
2002(loan)	→Ebbw Vale RFC
2003–06	Maesteg RFC
2008–13	Heol y Cyw RFC
1996	Barbarians RFC	1	1			5
	Total	1	1	0	0	5
Representative
Years	Team	Pld	T	G	FG	P
1990–01	Wales	35	10	0	0	50
1997	British and Irish Lions	1	0	0	0	0

Rugby league
- Position: Centre
Club
Years	Team	Pld	T	G	FG	P
1990–95	Warrington	142	52	0	1	209
1995–96	Cronulla Sharks	33	6	0	0	24
2003–08	Bridgend Blue Bulls
	Total	175	58	0	1	233
Representative
Years	Team	Pld	T	G	FG	P
1990–04	Wales	14	6	0	0	24
1990–96	Great Britain	3	0	0	0	0

Allan Glen Bateman (born 6 March 1965) is a Welsh former rugby union and rugby league footballer who played in the 1980s, 1990s and 2000s. He is a dual-code rugby international centre who represented the British and Irish Lions at rugby union, and Great Britain at rugby league.

== Life and career ==
Born in the village of Caerau two miles north of the town of Maesteg in Cwm Llynfi - the Llynfi Valley - in the county of Glamorgan, Bateman was a precocious rugby talent playing for his Primary and Junior school team, Plasnewydd in Maesteg (coached by David Rogers), and the Maesteg Town team in the 1970s. He excelled at both rugby and soccer, being a very fast sprinter, and also possessing a very large lung capacity which allowed him to recover from physical exertion rapidly. He was an outstanding player for Maesteg Comprehensive School where he was coached by Peter Williams, brother of Wales and British Lions superstar J.J. Williams (also from the Llynfi Valley), and by Wales back row international Gareth Williams. He began his senior rugby career for Maesteg RFC "The Old Parish" at their Llynfi Road ground. As a centre for Neath, Bateman gained four caps for Wales in 1990 before moving to rugby league with Warrington Wolves.

Bateman played right-centre in Warrington's 12-2 victory over Bradford Northern in the 1990–91 Regal Trophy Final during the 1990–91 season at Headingley, Leeds on Saturday 12 January 1991, and played right-centre in the 10-40 defeat by Wigan in the 1994–95 Regal Trophy Final during the 1994–95 season at Alfred McAlpine Stadium, Huddersfield on Saturday 28 January 1995. He returned to rugby union after it went professional in 1996 to gain a further 31 Wales caps and one for the British and Irish Lions in 1997. In rugby league he played for Wales 13 times and Great Britain twice. He also had a successful spell in Australian rugby league with the Cronulla Sharks. During his short stint at Northampton Saints he was a key figure in their Heineken Cup triumph in 2000. He became known as "The Clamp" in his rugby league days because of the ferocity of his tackling. He follows in a tradition of rugby talents from the Llynfi Valley including Windsor Major, Ray Chico Hopkins, J. J. Williams and Gwyn Evans.

Career Record in Rugby Union for Wales: Played 35: Won 22, Lost 13 Test Points: 50 Tries: 10.

Following his retirement from professional rugby, Bateman resumed playing for his hometown club of Maesteg. Putting his education to good use, he worked in the Hematology Department of Princess of Wales Hospital, Bridgend and for several years continued to play at amateur level for local club Heol-y-Cyw.

== International honours ==
Allan Bateman won Rugby League caps for Wales while at Warrington, Cronulla, and Bridgend Blue Bulls 1991...2003 14-caps 5(6?)-tries 20(24?)-points.
