= Simon Hodgkinson =

England international rugby union player

Simon Hodgkinson (born 15 December 1962) is a former England international rugby union player. He represented England at fullback between 1989 and 1991, gaining 14 Test caps.

== Career ==
Hodgkinson made his debut against Romania in Bucharest in 1989 and was a main part of the side which completed the Grand Slam at the 1991 Five Nations Championship, kicking 60 points in four matches (a world record at the time, but had since been broken by Jonny Wilkinson). He had goal-kicking stats of 80.23% successful place-kicks (penalties and conversions) over his career – an extremely high rate in the years of amateur rugby: and still holds the record for the most penalties converted in a Five Nations/Six Nations match with the seven he successfully converted in the 25–6 victory over Wales in Cardiff. However, he was primarily a consistent place-kicker and not viewed as much of an attacking threat; after harsh criticism of England's dour forward-based tactics in their 1991 Grand Slam he was replaced by Jonathan Webb, previously considered less consistent with the boot, in both place-kicks and penalties, but was seen to be more adventurous with the ball in hand. Hodgkinson was however in the squad for the 1991 Rugby World Cup held in England, Ireland, Scotland, Wales and France: and played in the victorious team against United States of America. Hodgkinson scored 203 points in his 14 appearances, with a sole try coming against Argentina in Buenos Aires on tour in 1990. Although he might be considered unlucky to have lost his place when he did, injuries curtailed his subsequent career and he was never able to regain a place in the international team.

Hodgkinson was later named as the idol of one of the world's best players, Jonny Wilkinson – which was mentioned in his biography Jonny.

== Personal life ==
Simon Hodgkinson married farmer's daughter Fiona Radley (Fiona Hodgkinson) in Southwell Minister on 22 August 1992. Their first child Olivia Honor Hodgkinson was born on 15 November 1994, and their second daughter Anna Victoria Hodgkinson was born on 25 August 1998. Both children attended Wellow House Prep School in Ollerton, Nottinghamshire and at the age of 13 to 18 they both attended Oundle School, Northamptonshire.

During his club career, he played for Nottingham and Moseley, where he captained for 3 seasons. He retired from being one of the head rugby coaches at Oundle School, Northamptonshire along with John Olver in 2017 after 15 years of coaching.
