= Steve Smith (rugby union, born 1959) =

Irish rugby union player (born 1959)

Stephen James Smith (born 18 July 1959 in Belfast, Northern Ireland) is a former Ireland international rugby union player. He played as a hooker.

He had 25 caps for Ireland, from 1988 to 1993, scoring 2 tries, 8 points in aggregate. He was selected for the 1991 Rugby World Cup, playing three games and was a replacement called out for the inaugural World Cup in New Zealand/Australia in 1987.

Smith played for 5 seasons at the Five Nations, in 1989, 1990, 1991, 1992 and 1993. In 1988 represented the Barbarians against the touring Wallabies at Cardiff making his full debut for Ireland in the same year. In 1989 he toured Australia with the British and Irish Lions and in the same year represented an International Touring XV as part of the South African Rugby Union centenary celebrations. Also in 1989 represented the Home Nations against France in Paris as part of the 200th anniversary celebrations of the French Revolution. At the time played club rugby for Ballymena R.F.C. whom he represented from 1978 to 1993 and his province Ulster debut in 1981.
