= David Wyn Evans =

Wales international rugby union player

- Born: David Wyn Evans; 1 November 1965 (age 61) Wootton Bassett, England
- Height: 5 ft 9 in (1.75 m)
- Weight: 77 kg (12 st 2 lb)

Rugby union career
- Position: Fly-half
Senior career
Years	Team	Apps	(Points)
1984-1992	Cardiff RFC	117	(667)
1993-1999	Treorchy RFC	93	(659)
International career
Years	Team	Apps	(Points)
1989-1995	Wales	12	(6)

David Wyn Evans (born 1 November 1965) is a former international rugby union player who represented the Wales national team on twelve occasions between 1989 and 1995. He played club rugby for Cardiff RFC and Treorchy RFC.

Evans joined Cardiff RFC in 1984. He made his international début in 1989 against France. He played in all four of Wales' matches during the 1990 Five Nations Championship. Evans was named as part of the 1991 Rugby World Cup squad, and played in one game during the tournament, as a replacement fly half against Australia.

In 1992, Evans left Cardiff after playing 117 games for the club and joined Treorchy RFC. The move seemingly ended his international career, but he was named in Wales' 1995 Rugby World Cup squad, and played one final game for the national team during the tournament, against Japan. Evans played 93 games for Treorchy, his last game in 1999.

== Personal life ==
Evans graduated from University of Wales, Swansea in 1988 with a BSc degree in Management Science. Following his graduation from Swansea, he studied for a diploma in Social Studies from Oxford University. While at Oxford, he featured in the 1988 Varsity match against Cambridge University, starting in the centre position.

Evans worked for Sport Wales as their high performance manager for Elite Cymru between 1991 and 2008. In 2008, Evans joined the Welsh Government as their International Sports Events Manager.
