= Nigel Heslop =

England international rugby union & league footballer

Personal information
- Full name: Nigel John Heslop
- Born: 4 December 1963 (age 62) Hartlepool, County Durham, England

Playing information
- Height: 5 ft 10 in (1.78 m)
- Weight: 13 st 0 lb (83 kg)

Rugby union
- Position: Wing
Club
Years	Team	Pld	T	G	FG	P
1987–92	Orrell R.U.F.C.
1990	Liverpool St Helens
1995–98	Orrell R.U.F.C.
	Total	0	0	0	0	0
Representative
Years	Team	Pld	T	G	FG	P
1990–92	England	9+1	3	0	0	12

Rugby league
Club
Years	Team	Pld	T	G	FG	P
1992–95	Oldham	30+6	10	0	0	40

Nigel John Heslop (born 4 December 1963) is an English former rugby union and professional rugby league footballer who played in the 1980s and 1990s. He played representative level rugby union (RU) for England, and at club level for Orrell R.U.F.C. (two spells), and Liverpool St Helens F.C. as a Wing, and club level rugby league (RL) for Oldham, at the time of his move to Oldham, he was employed by Merseyside Police.

== Background ==
Nigel Heslop was born in West Hartlepool, England.

== International career ==
Nigel Heslop represented England on ten occasions between 1990 and 1992, playing in two of the matches of the 1991 Rugby World Cup, including a very physical encounter with France. He was a member of England's 1991 5 Nations Grand Slam winning side, scoring a try against the Scots at Twickenham in the Calcutta Cup match of that year. He was surprisingly dropped for the first two matches of the World Cup, in favour of Chris Oti: marked his return with a try in the third and final group-stage match against the USA: but emerged from the quarter-final against France considerably battered and bruised. Although he completed the match he was not judged fit to start in either the semi-final or final, and with Oti also injured, Heslop's place on the wing was taken by the squad's utility-back replacement, Simon Halliday - who more usually played centre. Heslop took a place on the bench for both matches but was not called on to play. England kept the World Cup Final back line in place throughout the 1992 season, keeping Heslop on the bench: his final international appearance was in the last match of that season, coming on as a replacement for Carling in the final few minutes. Thus, the match, and his career, finished with the brief and incongruous situation of Heslop (a specialist winger) playing in the centre, while Halliday (a specialist centre) played on the wing in Heslop's usual position.

Heslop subsequently switched codes to play rugby league for Oldham, bringing an end to his chances of international selection for the Rugby Union team. He returned to Rugby Union - and his old club, Orrell RFC - in 1995, but did not challenge for international selection again.
