= Brian Smith (rugby, born 1966) =

Australian and Irish rugby union player (1966–2026)

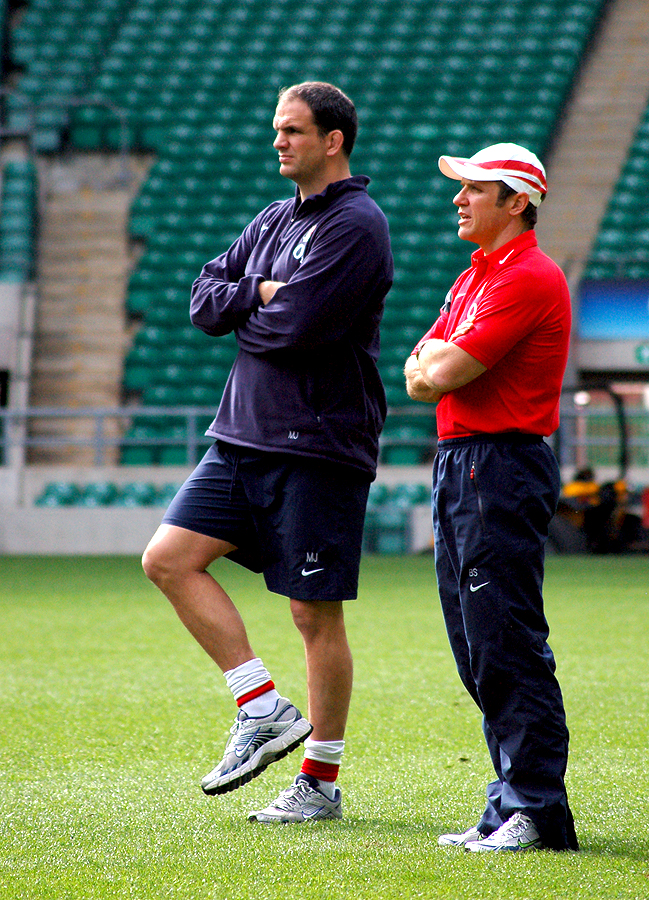
- Smith (right) in 2009
- Born: 9 September 1966 St George, Queensland, Australia
- Died: 12 August 2026 (aged 59)
- Height: 5 ft 10 in (1.78 m)
- School: Brisbane State High School

Rugby union career
- Position: Fly-half
Senior career
Years	Team	Apps	(Points)
1990–1991	Leicester Tigers		
Provincial / State sides
Years	Team	Apps	(Points)
1985–1987	Queensland		
International career
Years	Team	Apps	(Points)
1987	Australia	5	(25)
1989–1991	Ireland	9	(27)
Coaching career
- Years: Team
- Ricoh Rugby Club
- New South Wales
- ACT Brumbies
- Australia Sevens
- Eastern Suburbs
- Bath Rugby
- London Irish
- The Scots College
- Rugby league career

Playing information
- Position: Five-eighth, Halfback
Club
Years	Team	Pld	T	G	FG	P
1991–93	Balmain Tigers	37	6	84	6	198
1994	Eastern Suburbs	6	0	15	0	30
	Total	43	6	99	6	228

Brian Anthony Smith (9 September 1966 – 12 August 2026) was an Australian rugby union coach, player and rugby league footballer who played in the 1980s and 1990s. He played for both Australia and Ireland in rugby union.

== Early life ==
Smith was born in St George, Queensland on 9 September 1966. He completed secondary school at Brisbane State High School before being selected to play rugby union for Queensland.

In 1983, Smith represented Australian Schools when they defeated New Zealand Schools 12–9 in Sydney, Australia.

== Career ==
Smith won six caps for Australia in 1987. He played in two Varsity matches for Oxford University RFC as well as captaining them. He played for Wests Bulldogs. He also played nine times for Ireland between 1989 and 1991 as a fly-half. For the 1990/91 season he played club rugby for Leicester Tigers in England.

He later played rugby league for the Balmain Tigers (1991 to 1993) and Eastern Suburbs (1994) in the NSWRL competition. In 1992, he played City Origin. He played mainly as a five-eighth and also as a halfback.

Smith coached rugby union at the Ricoh Rugby Club in Japan, Eastern Suburbs in Sydney, Bath Rugby, the youth setup in New South Wales, and was coaching co-ordinator at the ACT Brumbies. He coached at representative level with the Australia Sevens side. While Director of Rugby at London Irish in the Guinness Premiership, Smith was linked with the Ireland job as a replacement for Eddie O'Sullivan. In July 2008 he was appointed England attack coach.

== Death ==
Smith died from cancer on 12 August 2026, at the age of 59. At the time of his death, he was Head of Sport at Scots College, Sydney.
