= Martyn Morris =

Wales international rugby union player

- Full name: Martyn Stuart Morris
- Born: 23 August 1962 (age 64) Neath, Wales
- Height: 6 ft 3 in (191 cm)

Rugby union career
- Position: Flanker
International career
Years	Team	Apps	(Points)
1985–92	Wales	11	(0)

Martyn Stuart Morris (born 23 August 1962) is a Welsh former rugby union international.

Born in Neath, Morris was a flanker who was capped in 11 Tests for Wales, debuting in the 1985 Five Nations Championship. He didn't play for the national team again until 1990 and in 1991 was selected for the World Cup. His only appearance at the World Cup was as an injury substitute in the loss to Western Samoa. He earned his final Test cap against England at Twickenham in 1992. A Neath RFC player, Morris later served the club as team manager.

== See also ==
- List of Wales national rugby union players
