= Tony Clement (rugby union) =

British Lions & Wales international rugby union footballer

- Born: Anthony Clement; 8 February 1967 (age 59) Morriston, Swansea, Wales
- Height: 5 ft 10 in (1.78 m)
- Weight: 13 st 10 lb (87 kg)

Rugby union career
- Position(s): Fullback, Flyhalf.
Amateur team(s)
Years	Team	Apps	(Points)
1985-1999	Swansea RFC	248	(327)
1987-1993	Barbarian F.C.	4	(0)
International career
Years	Team	Apps	(Points)
1987–1995	Wales	37	(38)
1989,1993	British & Irish Lions	9	(18)

Tony Clement (born Morriston, 8 February 1967) is a former Welsh international rugby union player. He played as a fullback and was awarded 37 caps for Wales, scoring 7 tries and a drop goal. He played at the 1991 Rugby World Cup finals and at the 1995 Rugby World Cup finals. Tony represented the British & Irish lions in 1989, touring to Australia. In 1993 he toured New Zealand with the British Lions, scoring £ tries and a drop goal for the Lions. At the time played club rugby for Swansea RFC. Clement played 248 games for Swansea scoring 62 tries.

Tony Clement spent his entire playing career with his club, Swansea. He then went on to become head coach of the club, along with Keith Colclough.

Tony was formerly Wales under 20s team manager.
