= Neath RFC =

Welsh rugby union club, based in Neath

(Wales) Neath RFC
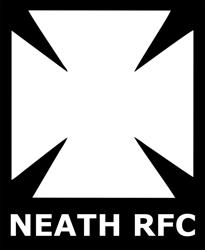
- Full name: Neath Rugby Football Club
- Nickname: Welsh All Blacks
- Founded: 1871; 155 years ago
- Location: Neath, Wales
- Ground: The Gnoll (Capacity: 7,500)
- CEO: Matt Curch
- Coach(es): Patrick Horgan (Coach), Forwards Coach: Andy Howell
- Captain: Ryan Evans
- League: Welsh Premier Division
- 2024-25: 3rd
Team kit

Official website
- www.neathrfc.com

Neath Rugby Football Club (Welsh: Clwb Rygbi Castell-Nedd) is a Welsh rugby union club which plays in the Indigo Premiership for Season 2024/25. The club's home ground is The Gnoll, Neath. The team is known as the All Blacks because of the team colours: black with only a white cross pattée as an emblem. They were formed in 1871. They are feeder club to the Ospreys regional team.

== History ==
=== Early history ===
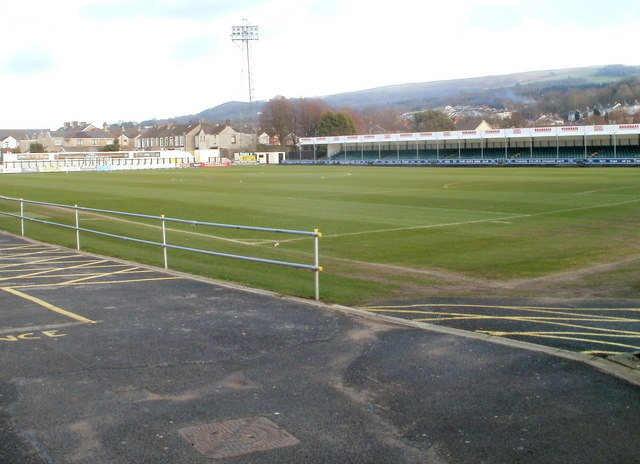
The Gnoll. Home of Neath RFC

Neath Rugby Football club was established in 1871 by a consortium of ten enthusiasts, their captain at the time, T. P. Whittington would later play international rugby for Scotland in 1873.

The club's nickname, 'The Welsh All Blacks', comes from their iconic strip of black jersey, shorts and socks with a white cross pattée. The origin of the team colours is not known for sure. Originally the club's players represented the team in various dark kits and the Cross pattée was introduced by one of their players, thought to have been E.C. Moxham, "to break the monotony". Neath's cross pattée is often incorrectly referred to as a Maltese Cross. It is believed that the strip was later switched to the pure black kit as a mark of respect to player Dick Gordon, who died from injuries sustained on the field of play against Bridgend RFC in 1880.

On 12 June 1881, eleven teams met in the Castle Hotel, Neath to form what would be accepted as a Welsh rugby union. The founding clubs of the WFU (Welsh Football Union), as it was originally known, were Swansea C & FC, Pontypool RFC, Newport RFC, Merthyr RFC, Llanelli RFC, Bangor RFC, Brecon RFC, Cardiff RFC, Lampeter College, Llandovery College and Llandeilo RFC. Strangely Neath RFC was not recorded as being present, even though the meeting took place in the town. It is unknown if this was an oversight by the committee to record the presence of the club, or if Neath RFC did not actually attend. One theory put forward is that the president, John Llewellyn and secretary, Sam Clark of the South Wales Football Union were both Neath men. By attending this new union they would be destroying the SWFU and therefore their own influence in the game. These wounds would soon heal and Neath joined the newly formed WFU in the 1882–83 season and would eventually become pivotal in the union's development, monopolizing the secretaryship from 1896 to 1955. Sam Clark would in turn become the first Welsh international from Neath RFC, playing in the second Wales game on 28 January 1882. In December 1882 it was decided to amalgamate Neath FC and Neath Abbey FC.

In 1887/88 Neath RFC undertook their first tour of the northern English clubs, including Hartlepool, Manningham and Wortley. The next season Neath played host to Widnes on Christmas Day before undertaking a further northern tour taking on a further five teams in six days. During the 1890/91 season a South West England tour was introduced, which would later become an annual fixture facing clubs such as Bristol and London Welsh.

Martyn Davies was Captain of Neath in the Club's Centenary year of 1971/72, and it was he who became the first captain to hold the Welsh Cup, carrying it on its now customary "lap of honour" around the Old Cardiff Arms Park.

=== 2007/08 season ===
Their 2007/08 championship season, their fourth in succession, was overshadowed by the death of scrum-half of Gareth Jones, on 16 June 2008. Jones had been injured in a match against Cardiff RFC on 20 April.

=== 2008/09 season ===
Their 2008/09 cup winning season, in which they claimed a victory over Llanelli at the Millennium Stadium, Cardiff. This was the first year since the cup name changed from Konica Minolta Cup to Swalec Cup.

== Club records ==
Neath RFC hold the world record for the number of points (1,917) and tries (345) accumulated in one season (47 Games). This record was set during the 1988/89 season, it is also worth noting that a try was worth 4 points at the time the record was broken.

The record for the most tries scored in a game in the post-regional era (post 2002) is held by Richard Smith. In January 2010 against Kidwelly RFC Smith scored 7 tries. The pre-regional record of 6 tries is jointly held by Howie Jones (v Aberavon 1928/29), W.D. Williams (v B.P.Llandarcy 1949/50), Keith Maddocks (v Ebbw Vale 1956/57), Alan Edmunds (v Cross Keys 1989/90).

== Organisation and finance ==
The company that runs Neath RFC is Neath Rugby Ltd.

The key lines from the Geraint Hawkes disqualification legal judgement

On 4 June 2015, Geraint Hawkes (Current chairman of Neath RFC and 50% owner of the club) was found to be "unfit to be concerned in the management of a company" by Judge Keyser Q.C. sitting as a Judge of the High Court (see para 68 of the judgement document) He also decided that the evidence given by Hawkes was "deliberately false" (para 48 - see image).

On 1 July 2015 the judge confirmed the length of the disqualification, as reported by the BBC: "The owner of Neath RFC and his mother have been banned from being company directors for 10 years after failing to declare more than £1.5m in VAT. Geraint Hawkes, 48, and Janis Hawkes, 75, were given the ban at a hearing in Cardiff on Wednesday. Judge Andrew Keyser QC said the pair had been involved in a "serious case" of unpaid VAT. The decision followed a hearing in the High Court Chancery Division sitting in Cardiff last month."

In an effort to generate more income at their home stadium The Gnoll, the club announced in late 2008, plans to share it with the town's football club Neath Athletic. This football team ceased trading at the end of the 2011-12 season due to financial difficulties.

Jardine Norton Ltd became the owners of Neath Rugby Ltd in January 2019.

== Club honours ==
- Welsh Club Champions: 1909/10, 1910/11, 1928/29, 1933/34, 1934/35, 1946/47, 1966/67, 1986/87, 1988/89, 1989/90
- Welsh Premier Division: 1990/91, 1995/96, 2004/05, 2005/06, 2006/07, 2007/08, 2009/10
- Welsh Cup: 1971/72, 1988/89, 1989/90, 2003/04, 2007/08, 2008/09, 2025/26
- Welsh Cup Finalists: 1983/84, 1987/88, 1992/93, 1995/96, 2000/01, 2005/06, 2012/13
- Snelling Sevens 1964, 1970
- Principality Premiership Play Off Champions: 2009/2010
- Premiership Cup Winners: 2021/22

=== Notable former players ===
See also Category:Neath RFC players

These players have represented Neath and have been capped at international level:

- (Wales) Les Anthony
- (Wales) Allan Bateman
- (Wales) Andrew Bishop
- (Wales) Billy Boston
- (Wales) Aled Brew
- (Wales) Nathan Brew
- (Wales) Chris Bridges
- (Wales) Howell John Davies
- (Wales) Jonathan Davies
- (Wales) Leigh Davies
- (Wales) David Morgan Evans
- (Wales) Scott Gibbs
- (Wales) Carl Gnojek
- (Wales) RK Green, 1908 British Lions
- (Wales) Thomas Hollingdale
- (Wales) James Hook
- (Wales) Alun Hopkins
- (Wales) Alan Edmunds
- (Wales) Roy John
- (Wales) Adam Jones
- (Wales) Duncan Jones
- (Wales) Lewis Jones
- (Wales) Lyn Jones
- (Scotland) Wilson Lauder
- (Wales) John Leighton Davies
- (Wales) Gareth Llewellyn
- (Wales) Glyn Llewellyn
- (Wales) Courtney Meredith
- (Wales) Dai Morris
- (Wales) Darren Morris
- (Wales) Martyn Morris
- (Wales) Fred Perrett
- (Wales) Kevin Phillips
- (Wales) Rowland Phillips
- (Wales) David Pickering
- (Wales) Ron Waldron
- (Wales) Gerwyn Price
- (Wales) Phil Pugh
- (Wales) Elgan Rees
- (Wales) Huw Richards
- (Wales) Glyn Shaw
- (Wales) Brett Sinkinson
- (Wales) Rees Stephens
- (Wales) Brian Thomas
- (Wales) William Lewis Thomas
- (Wales) Paul Thorburn
- (Wales) Barry Williams
- (Wales) Brian Williams
- (Wales) Shane Williams
- (Wales) Walter Williams

== Games played against international opposition ==
Year	Date	Opponent	Result	Score	Tour
1908^{1}	15 October	Australia	Loss	0–15	1908 Australian tour of the British Isles
1912	19 December	South Africa	Loss	3–8	1912-13 South Africa rugby union tour
1931^{1}	28 November	South Africa	Loss	3-8	1931–32 South Africa rugby union tour
1935^{1}	14 December	New Zealand	Loss	3-13	1935-36 New Zealand tour
1947^{1}	25 October	Australia	Loss	9-19	1947-48 Australia tour
1951^{1}	17 November	South Africa	Loss	0-22	1951–52 South Africa rugby union tour
1954^{1}	23 January	New Zealand	Loss	5-11	1953–54 New Zealand tour
1957^{1}	28 December	Australia	Loss	3-5	1957–58 Australia tour
1970	5 September	West Germany	Win	28–0	
1973^{1}	24 January	New Zealand	Loss	3-43	1972-73 New Zealand tour
1983	15 October	Japan	Draw	21-21	1983 Japan rugby union tour of Wales
1987	31 October	United States	Loss	6–15	1987 United States rugby union tour of Wales
1989	25 October	New Zealand	Loss	15-26	1989 New Zealand tour
1992	11 November	Australia	Loss	8-16	1992 Australia tour
1994	2 November	South Africa	Loss	13–16	1994-95 South Africa rugby union tour
1995	25 October	Fiji	Win	30–22	1995 Fiji tour of Wales
1997	4 January	United States	Win	39-15	1997 United States tour of Wales
2001	21 November	Uruguay	Win	29-3	2001 Uruguay rugby union tour of Wales

^{1} All these matches were played by a joint Neath/Aberavon team.

== Neath Rugby Supporters Club ==
The Supporters Club was restarted at the end of the 2012–13 season, with the aim of providing a link between the fans and the club. The 2013–14 season saw the first Neath Supporters Hall of Fame, an event intended to take place every season.

2014 inductees: TP Whittington, Brian Williams, Brian Thomas, Shane Williams, Steve Powell and Dai Morris

2015 inductees: Rees Stephens, Martyn Davies, Ron Waldron, Kevin Phillips and Gareth Llewellyn
