= Mike Griffiths =

British Lions & Wales international rugby union footballer

- Born: Michael Griffiths; 18 March 1962 (age 64) Clydach Vale, Wales
- School: Blaenclydach Comprehensive

Rugby union career
- Position: Prop
Amateur team(s)
Years	Team	Apps	(Points)
- Ystrad Rhondda RFC
–	Bridgend RFC		
–	Cardiff RFC		
–	Wasps		
–	Pontypridd RFC		
–	Barbarian F.C.		
International career
Years	Team	Apps	(Points)
1988–1998	Wales	35	(0)
1989	British Lions	0	(0)

Michael Griffiths (born 18 March 1962) is a former Welsh rugby union player and British Lion, currently coaching Ystrad Rhondda RFC in the Welsh Rugby Union Division 2 East. He plied his trade with Pontypridd RFC between 1997 and 2003, making 73 appearances.

Griffiths's father is George Griffiths, a builder, and his mother is Joy Griffiths. He has two sons, Joel Michael and Luc Rhys. They both play for Ystrad Rhondda RFC.
