= Paul Arnold (rugby union) =

Wales international rugby union footballer

- Born: Paul Arnold; 28/04/1968 Morriston Hospital
- Height: 196 cm (6 ft 5 in)
- Weight: 100 kg (15 st 10 lb)

Rugby union career
- Position: Lock
Senior career
Years	Team	Apps	(Points)
1987–2000 - 2009 - 2011	Swansea RFC,	316	(193)
–	Carmarthen Quins RFC		
International career
Years	Team	Apps	(Points)
1989–1996	Wales	16	(8)

Paul Arnold (born 28 April 1968) is a former Welsh international rugby union rugby player. A lock forward, Arnold played club rugby for Swansea and for the Welsh national team, winning 16 caps and scoring a total of 8 points.
