= Steve Ford =

Wales international rugby union & league player

- Born: Stephen Paul Ford; 15 August 1965 (age 61) Cardiff, Wales
- Height: 6 ft 0 in (1.83 m)
- Weight: 13 st 6 lb (85 kg)
- School: Llanrumney High School
- Notable relative(s): Phil Ford (brother); Luke Ford (son)
- Occupation: carpet fitter

Rugby union career
- Position: wing
Amateur team(s)
Years	Team	Apps	(Points)
- Rumney RFC
1984-1998	Cardiff RFC	234	(920)
International career
Years	Team	Apps	(Points)
1990-1991	Wales	8	(8)
- Rugby league career

Playing information
- Position: Wing
Club
Years	Team	Pld	T	G	FG	P
1985	Leeds	2	1	0	0	4
1985–86	Salford	9	1	0	0	4
	Total	11	2	0	0	8

Stephen Paul Ford (born 15 August 1965 in Cardiff) was a Welsh international rugby union winger. After being banned from rugby union for an act of professionalism, he was eventually allowed back into the sport and went on to represent the Wales national team. He played club rugby for Cardiff.

== Rugby career ==
=== Club career ===
Steve Ford played rugby as a schoolboy representing Llanrumney High School before joining Rumney RFC. In April 1985, Ford made his debut for Cardiff.

Later that year, he had a trial with rugby league club Leeds. He made two appearances for the club as an amateur, scoring a try in a 60–12 win against Keighley in the Yorkshire Cup. He was offered a contract by Leeds, but Ford decided to return to Wales and resume playing for Cardiff. However, the Welsh Rugby Union soon learned of Ford's appearances for Leeds, and banned him from playing rugby union due to the sport's stance on professionalism. During his ban, Ford played several rugby league matches with Salford during the 1985–86 season. At the time, Ford claimed that he had only received expenses for his appearances in rugby league, but admitted many years later that he was paid to play the sport.

His ban was eventually lifted, and he began playing for Cardiff again in 1988. He scored 198 tries for Cardiff.

=== International career ===
In 1990 he won his first full international cap, facing Ireland as part of the 1990 Five Nations Championship. Ford was utilised on the wing, and scored a try on his debut. Despite this Wales lost the match 14-8. Ford was next selected for Wales on their 1990 Summer tour of Namibia. Ford played in both tour Tests against Namibia, Wales winning both.

After representing Wales against the touring Barbarians in October 1990, Ford was selected for the 1991 Five Nations Championship. Ford played in three of the Championship matches; the loss to England at Cardiff followed by a second defeat, this time to Scotland in which Ford scored his second and final international try. Ford's final home nations game was a draw with Ireland. Ford's final international was during the 1991 Wales tour of Australia, in which Wales were crushed 63-6 by Australia in Brisbane.

Although he never played in any of the matches of the tournament, Ford was part of the Wales team that participated in the 1991 Rugby World Cup, hosted by England. Despite not representing the Wales team in the years following, he was chosen for the Wales squad for the 1995 Rugby World Cup but again failed to be selected for any of the tournament games.

=== International matches played ===
Wales

- Australia 1991
- Barbarians 1990
- England 1991
- Ireland 1990, 1991
- Namibia 1990, 1990
- Scotland 1991
