= Kevin Phillips (rugby union) =

Wales international rugby union footballer

- Born: Kevin Huw Phillips; 15 June 1961 (age 65) Hermon, Pembrokeshire, Wales

Rugby union career
- Position: Hooker
Amateur team(s)
Years	Team	Apps	(Points)
- Cardigan RFC
–	Neath RFC		
International career
Years	Team	Apps	(Points)
1987–1991	Wales	20	(0)

Kevin Huw Phillips (born 15 June 1961) is a former Wales international rugby union player.

A hooker, he played club rugby for Neath RFC. Phillips also captained the Welsh national team for two matches in the 1990 season, winning both games.

At the start of the 2010–11 season, he became the coach of the Crymych RFC youth team.
