= Paul Thorburn =

Wales international rugby union player

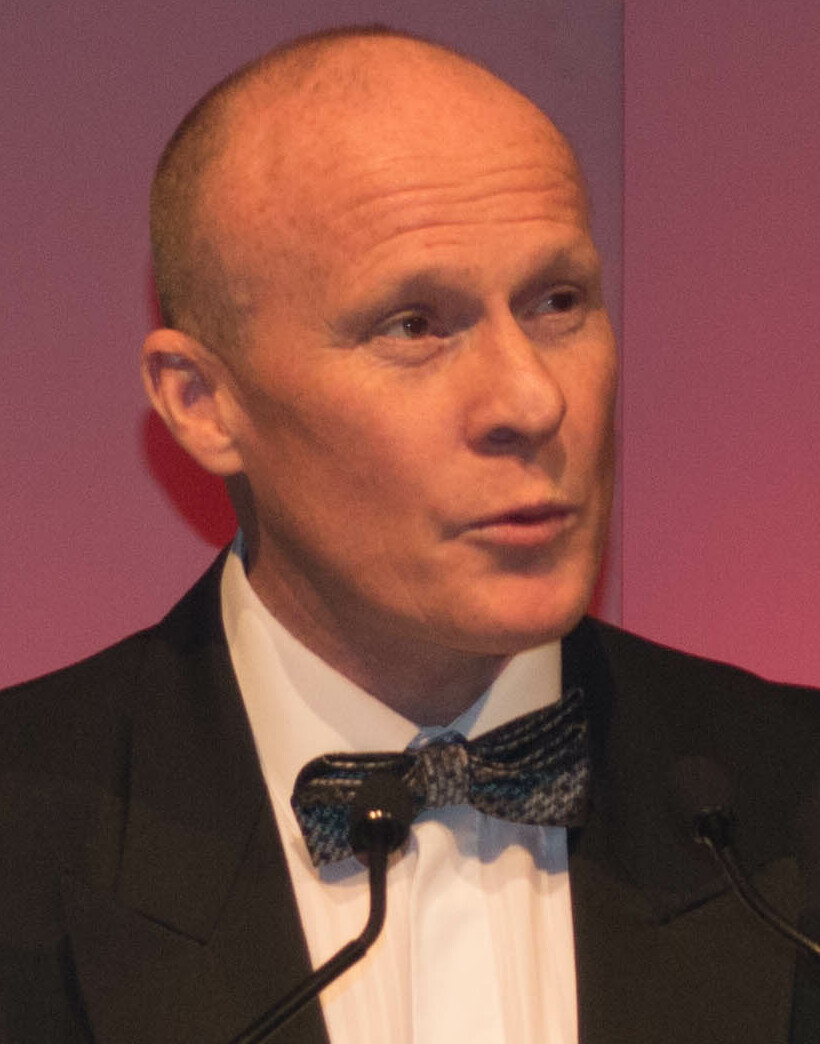
- Paul Thorburn in 2014
- Born: Paul Huw Thorburn; 24 November 1962 (age 63) Rheindahlen, West Germany
- Height: 6 ft 0 in (1.83 m)
- Weight: 14 st 2 lb (90 kg)
- School: Hereford Cathedral School
- University: University College, Swansea

Rugby union career
- Position: Full back
Amateur team(s)
Years	Team	Apps	(Points)
- South Gower RFC
–	Ebbw Vale RFC		
–	Neath RFC		
–	Barbarian F.C.		
International career
Years	Team	Apps	(Points)
1985–1991	Wales	37	(304)

Paul Thorburn (born 24 November 1962 in Rheindahlen, West Germany) is a former Neath RFC and international Wales rugby union player who played at full back and also featured in the Welsh international team.

Thorburn was a prolific long-distance goal kicker. He holds the record for the longest successful kick in an international test match (although not the longest in Rugby Union as a whole). He gained the record during the 1986 Five Nations Championship at Cardiff Arms Park with a penalty kick measuring exactly 70 yards 8 and a half inches (64.2m) against Scotland.

Thorburn was also in the Wales squad for the 1987 Rugby World Cup, during which he scored a conversion that won Wales third place in the competition.

He retired from playing in 1991. He was tournament director for the World Cup in 1999 and also a former special projects manager for the Welsh Rugby Union.

In 2006 he joined Ospreys after leaving the Welsh Rugby Union, however he left the club in June 2010 to pursue other business interests.
