= Ron Waldron =

Wales international rugby union player

- Born: Ronald Gwyn Waldron; 14 December 1933 (age 92) Neath, Wales

Rugby union career
- Position: Prop
Amateur team(s)
Years	Team	Apps	(Points)
- Neath RFC
–	Barbarian F.C.		
International career
Years	Team	Apps	(Points)
1965	Wales	4	(0)
Coaching career
- Years: Team
- ?: Neath RFC
- 1990-1991: Wales

Ronald Gwyn Waldron (born 14 December 1933) is a Welsh former rugby union international player. He later took up coaching and is best known as the former head coach of Neath RFC during the late 1980s when Neath dominated British rugby for a number of seasons. Waldron built a team of senior international players including Jonathan Davies and Allan Bateman. In 1990 he was appointed coach to the Wales national rugby union team but after certain players from the Cardiff club found his training methods too physically demanding he resigned in 1991.
