= Gareth Llewellyn =

Wales international rugby union player

- Born: Gareth Owen Llewellyn; 27 February 1969 (age 57) Cardiff, Wales
- Height: 1.98 m (6 ft 6 in)
- Weight: 114 kg (17 st 13 lb)
- School: Bryntirion Comprehensive School
- Notable relative(s): Glyn Llewellyn (brother), Max Llewellyn (son)

Rugby union career
- Position(s): Lock, Flanker
Senior career
| Years | Team | Apps | (Points) |
- Llanharan
| 1988-1996 | Neath | 116 | (24) |
| 1996-2000 | Harlequins | 100 | (20) |
| 2000-2003 | Neath | 66 | (10) |
| 2003-2004 | Ospreys | 6 | (0) |
| 2004 | Swansea | 2 | (5) |
| 2004-2005 | Narbonne | 22 | (0) |
| 2005-2008 | Bristol | 52 | (15) |
| 2008-2009 | Tonmawr | | |
International career
| Years | Team | Apps | (Points) |
| 1989–2004 | Wales | 92 | (24) |
Coaching career
- Years: Team
- 2008-2009: Tonmawr (Defence)
- 2009-: Thornbury

Gareth Owen Llewellyn (born 27 February 1969), is a Welsh former rugby union player who gained a record 92 caps for Wales as a lock. His record for Wales caps was surpassed by Gareth Thomas in May 2007. His brother, Glyn Llewellyn, also played international rugby union for Wales. His son, Max Llewellyn, plays for Gloucester Rugby .

== Rugby career ==
Llewellyn started his playing career at Llanharan RFC and then moved on to play first class rugby at Neath, Harlequins, Ospreys and Narbonne, and signed for Bristol Shoguns at the beginning of the 2005–06 season.

After excelling in the line-out for Neath in their match against the touring New Zealand All Blacks on 25 October 1989, he made his debut for Wales ten days later against the same opposition and went on to win a total of 92 caps, breaking the record of 87 held by Neil Jenkins in the test against Argentina on 12 June 2004.

He captained Wales on 7 occasions and appeared in three Rugby World Cups – 1995, 1999 and 2003. He played his last match for Wales in the narrow 26-25 defeat against New Zealand in November 2004. Such was his longevity that he played international rugby in three different decades and under eight different coaches. Following the 2004–05 season, he announced his retirement from international rugby. He was unlucky not to be selected for the Lions squad in 1993 to tour New Zealand.

From the beginning of the 2008–09 season, Llewellyn combined playing with a coaching role at Welsh First Division club Tonmawr. Since the 2009–10 season he is head coach at South West One West side Thornbury RFC working alongside Bristol's Darren Crompton and Rob Higgitt formerly of Bristol Rugby, the Scarlets and Worcester RFC.
