= 1997 Wales rugby union tour of North America =

- Coach: Kevin Bowring
- Tour captain: Gwyn Jones
Summary
P	W	D	L
Total
6	6	0	0
Test match
3	3	0	0
Opponent
P	W	D	L
United States
2	2	0	0
Canada
1	1	0	0

Tour chronology
- ← 1996 Australia 1998 Africa →

The Wales national rugby union team toured North America in July 1997, playing two tests against the United States and one against Canada, as well as three tour matches across the two countries. Wales won all six matches on the tour, including a 94–3 victory over an all-star team representing USA Rugby South in the opening game. They beat the United States in both Wilmington, North Carolina, and San Francisco, California, before beating Canada by the tour's narrowest margin (three points) in Markham, Ontario.

Wales named a weakened squad as their best and more experienced players were selected in the 1997 British and Irish Lions tour to South Africa. Several uncapped players were included in the squad, and coach Kevin Bowring gave test debuts to full-back Kevin Morgan and prop Chris Anthony against the United States, and flanker Rob Appleyard and lock Steve Moore against Canada.

== Squad ==
Head coach Kevin Bowring named a 30-man squad for Wales' tour of North America. Hooker Jonathan Humphreys, who had captained the team since September 1995, was left out of the squad, who were instead led by flanker Gwyn Jones. Several players were missing, having been called up to the British Lions squad for their tour to South Africa, including the two-time reigning Welsh Player of the Year, scrum-half Rob Howley. As a result, the Wales squad that travelled to North America had a youthful bias and featured several uncapped players, including Pontypridd full-back Kevin Morgan, who had recently received the Most Promising Player in Wales award.

Name	Position	Club	Notes
Gwyn Jones	Back row	Cardiff	Captain
Garin Jenkins	Hooker	Swansea	
Robin McBryde	Hooker	Llanelli	
Chris Anthony	Prop	Swansea	
Ian Buckett	Prop	Swansea	
Aled Griffiths	Prop	Pontypridd	Injury replacement for Christian Loader
Christian Loader	Prop	Swansea	
Lyndon Mustoe	Prop	Cardiff	
Gareth Llewellyn	Lock	Harlequins	
Steve Moore	Lock	Swansea	
Mike Voyle	Lock	Llanelli	
Neil Watkins	Lock	Neath	
Chris Wyatt	Lock	Llanelli	
Rob Appleyard	Back row	Swansea	
Andrew Gibbs	Back row	Llanelli	
Nathan Thomas	Back row	Bath	
Steve Williams	Back row	Neath	
Paul John	Scrum-half	Pontypridd	
Andy Moore	Scrum-half	Richmond	
Lee Jarvis	Fly-half	Cardiff	
Arwel Thomas	Fly-half	Swansea	
Neil Boobyer	Centre	Llanelli	
Leigh Davies	Centre	Cardiff	
Jason Lewis	Centre	Pontypridd	
Gareth Thomas	Centre	Bridgend	
Dafydd James	Wing	Bridgend	
Wayne Proctor	Wing	Llanelli	
Nigel Walker	Wing	Cardiff	
Gareth Wyatt	Wing	Pontypridd	
Matt Back	Full-back	Swansea	
Kevin Morgan	Full-back	Pontypridd	

== Matches ==
Date	Venue	Home	Score	Away
1 July 1997	Davidson College, Charlotte, North Carolina	South All Stars	3–94	Wales
5 July 1997	Brooks Field, Wilmington, North Carolina	United States	20–30	Wales
8 July 1997	Balboa Park, San Francisco, California	USA Development XV	23–55	Wales
12 July 1997	Balboa Park, San Francisco, California	United States	23–28	Wales
15 July 1997	Mohawk Sports Park, Hamilton, Ontario	Ontario	10–54	Wales
19 July 1997	Fletcher's Fields, Markham, Ontario	Canada	25–28	Wales

=== South All Stars vs Wales ===
1 July 1997
19:00

South All Stars	3–94	Wales
Drop: De Kock		Try: G. Wyatt (4); James (3); Morgan (2); Jarvis (2); Moore; C. Wyatt; G. Thomas; Con: Jarvis (12)

Davidson College, Charlotte, North Carolina

=== United States vs Wales (1st test) ===
5 July 1997

United States	20–30	Wales
Try: Takau; Anitoni; Con: Alexander (2); Pen: Alexander (2)		Try: A. Thomas (2); Walker; Jones; Con: A. Thomas (2); Pen: A. Thomas (2)

Brooks Field, Wilmington, North Carolina
Referee: Ken McCartney (Scotland)

FB	15	Chris Morrow	Substituted off
RW	14	Vaea Anitoni
OC	13	Tomasi Takau
IC	12	Mark Scharrenberg	Substituted off
LW	11	Brian Hightower
FH	10	Matt Alexander
SH	9	Andre Bachelet
N8	8	Dan Lyle (c)
OF	7	Jay Wilkerson	Substituted off
BF	6	Jason Walker
RL	5	Luke Gross
LL	4	Dave Hodges
TP	3	Ray Lehner
HK	2	Tom Billups
LP	1	Christopher Lippert
Replacements:
FB		Kurt Shuman	Substituted on
CE		Alatini Saulala	Substituted on
FL		Mika McLeod	Substituted on
Coach:
(United States) Jack Clark

FB	15	Kevin Morgan
RW	14	Wayne Proctor
OC	13	Leigh Davies
IC	12	Gareth Thomas
LW	11	Nigel Walker
FH	10	Arwel Thomas
SH	9	Paul John
N8	8	Steve Williams	Substituted off
OF	7	Gwyn Jones (c)
BF	6	Andrew Gibbs
RL	5	Mike Voyle
LL	4	Gareth Llewellyn
TP	3	Lyndon Mustoe
HK	2	Garin Jenkins
LP	1	Christian Loader	Substituted off
Replacements:
PR		Chris Anthony	Substituted on
N8		Nathan Thomas	Substituted on
Coach:
Kevin Bowring

=== USA Development XV vs Wales ===
8 July 1997

USA Development XV	23–55	Wales
Try: Holtzman; Shuman; Con: Flecton (2); Pen: Flecton (3)		Try: Back (2); Lewis (2); Moore (2); James (2); Appleyard; Con: Jarvis (5)

Balboa Park, San Francisco, California

=== United States vs Wales (2nd test) ===
12 July 1997

United States	23–28	Wales
Try: Anitoni; Walker; Con: Alexander (2); Pen: Alexander (3)		Try: Proctor (3); A. Thomas; Con: A. Thomas; Pen: A. Thomas (2)

Balboa Park, San Francisco, California
Referee: Chuck Muir (Scotland)

FB	15	Chris Morrow
RW	14	Vaea Anitoni
OC	13	Tomasi Takau	Substituted off
IC	12	Mark Scharrenberg
LW	11	Brian Hightower
FH	10	Matt Alexander
SH	9	Andre Bachelet
N8	8	Jason Walker	Substituted off
OF	7	Jay Wilkerson	Substituted off
BF	6	Dan Lyle (c)
RL	5	Dave Hodges
LL	4	Luke Gross
TP	3	Ray Lehner
HK	2	Tom Billups	Substituted off
LP	1	Christopher Lippert
Replacements:
CE		Alatini Saulala	Substituted on
HK		Sean Allen	Substituted on
FL		Mika McLeod	Substituted on
FL		Scott Yungling	Substituted on
Coach:
(United States) Jack Clark

FB	15	Kevin Morgan
RW	14	Wayne Proctor
OC	13	Leigh Davies
IC	12	Gareth Thomas
LW	11	Nigel Walker
FH	10	Arwel Thomas
SH	9	Paul John
N8	8	Nathan Thomas
OF	7	Gwyn Jones (c)
BF	6	Andrew Gibbs
RL	5	Mike Voyle
LL	4	Gareth Llewellyn
TP	3	Lyndon Mustoe
HK	2	Robin McBryde
LP	1	Ian Buckett
Replacements:
PR		Chris Anthony	Substituted on
FL		Steve Williams
Coach:
Kevin Bowring

=== Ontario vs Wales ===
15 July 1997

Ontario	10–54	Wales
Try: Pagano; Con: Pettigrew; Pen: Pettigrew		Try: G. Wyatt (3); James (2); Jarvis (2); Appleyard; Boobyer; Con: Jarvis (3); Pen: Jarvis

Mohawk Sports Park, Hamilton, Ontario

=== Canada vs Wales ===
19 July 1997

Canada	25–28	Wales
Try: Schmid (2); Ross; Con: Rees (2); Pen: Rees; Drop: Ross	Report	Try: Proctor; G. Thomas; Davies; Con: A. Thomas (2); Pen: A. Thomas (3)

Fletcher's Fields, Markham, Ontario
Referee: Santiago Borsani (Argentina)

FB	15	Bobby Ross
RW	14	Winston Stanley
OC	13	Dave Lougheed
IC	12	Scott Bryan
LW	11	Scott Stewart
FH	10	Gareth Rees
SH	9	John Graf
N8	8	Mike Schmid
OF	7	John Hutchinson
BF	6	Al Charron
RL	5	John Tait
LL	4	Mike James
TP	3	Rod Snow
HK	2	Kevin Morgan	Substituted off
LP	1	Eddie Evans	Substituted off
Replacements:
SH	16	Rob Card
WG	17	Ron Toews
PR	18	Richard Bice	Substituted on
LK	19	Tony Healy
FL	20	Ian Gordon
HK	21	Mark Cardinal	Substituted on
Coach:
(Ireland) Patrick Parfrey

FB	15	Kevin Morgan
RW	14	Wayne Proctor
OC	13	Leigh Davies
IC	12	Gareth Thomas
LW	11	Nigel Walker
FH	10	Arwel Thomas
SH	9	Paul John
N8	8	Steve Williams
OF	7	Rob Appleyard
BF	6	Andrew Gibbs	Substituted off
RL	5	Mike Voyle
LL	4	Steve Moore
TP	3	Lyndon Mustoe
HK	2	Garin Jenkins
LP	1	Ian Buckett	Substituted off
Replacements:
CE	16	Neil Boobyer
FH	17	Lee Jarvis
SH	18	Andy Moore
N8	19	Nathan Thomas	Substituted on
PR	20	Chris Anthony	Substituted on
HK	21	Robin McBryde
Coach:
Kevin Bowring

Touch judges:
Victor Rabuffetti Ganzio (Argentina)
Ricardo Lanastra (Argentina)
