= 1997 New Zealand rugby union tour of Britain and Ireland =

Summary
P	W	D	L
Total
9	8	1	0
Test match
4	3	1	0
Opponent
P	W	D	L
Ireland
1	1	0	0
England
2	1	1	0
Wales
1	1	0	0

The New Zealand national rugby union team toured Britain and Ireland in November and December 1997. They played nine matches, including test matches against Wales, Ireland and two against England. They won each of the first eight games, but drew the second test against England in their final match, avoiding a clean sweep.

== Results ==
Scores and results list New Zealand's points tally first.

Opponent	For	Against	Date	Venue	Status
Llanelli	81	3	8 November 1997	Stradey Park, Llanelli	Tour match
Wales A	51	8	11 November 1997	Sardis Road, Pontypridd	Tour match
Ireland	63	15	15 November 1997	Lansdowne Road, Dublin	Test match
Emerging England	59	22	18 November 1997	McAlpine Stadium, Huddersfield	Tour match
England	25	8	22 November 1997	Old Trafford, Manchester	Test match
English Rugby Partnership XV	18	11	25 November 1997	Ashton Gate, Bristol	Tour match
Wales	42	7	29 November 1997	Wembley Stadium, London	Test match
England A	30	19	2 December 1997	Welford Road Stadium, Leicester	Tour match
England	26	26	6 December 1997	Twickenham Stadium, London	Test match

== Squads ==
=== New Zealand ===
The New Zealand Rugby selection panel named a squad of 36 for the tour, including six uncapped players: full-back Todd Miller, flanker Aaron Hopa, prop Gordon Slater, half-back Mark Robinson, number 8 Steve Surridge and centre Jeremy Stanley. Wing Jonah Lomu, second five-eighth Walter Little and flanker Andrew Blowers returned to the squad after illness and injury. Number 8 Zinzan Brooke was picked for his final All Black tour ahead of a move to English club Harlequins in 1998.

Name	Position	Club	Notes
Sean Fitzpatrick	Hooker	Auckland	Captain
Norm Hewitt	Hooker	Southland	
Anton Oliver	Hooker	Otago	
Bull Allen	Loosehead prop	Central Vikings	
Craig Dowd	Loosehead prop	Auckland	
Con Barrell	Tighthead prop	Canterbury	
Olo Brown	Tighthead prop	Auckland	
Gordon Slater	Tighthead prop	Taranaki	
Robin Brooke	Lock	Auckland	
Mark Cooksley	Lock	Waikato	
Ian Jones	Lock	North Harbour	
Charles Riechelmann	Lock	Auckland	
Todd Blackadder	Blindside flanker	Canterbury	
Aaron Hopa	Blindside flanker	Waikato	
Taine Randell	Blindside flanker	Otago	
Andrew Blowers	Openside flanker	Auckland	
Mark Carter	Openside flanker	Auckland	
Josh Kronfeld	Openside flanker	Otago	
Zinzan Brooke	Number 8	Auckland	
Steve Surridge	Number 8	Canterbury	
Justin Marshall	Half-back	Canterbury	
Jon Preston	Half-back	Wellington	
Mark Robinson	Half-back	North Harbour	
Andrew Mehrtens	First five-eighth	Canterbury	
Carlos Spencer	First five-eighth	Auckland	
Alama Ieremia	Second five-eighth	Wellington	
Walter Little	Second five-eighth	North Harbour	
Frank Bunce	Centre	North Harbour	
Scott McLeod	Centre	Waikato	
Jeremy Stanley	Centre	Auckland	
Jonah Lomu	Wing	Counties-Manukau	
Glen Osborne	Wing	North Harbour	
Tana Umaga	Wing	Wellington	
Jeff Wilson	Wing	Otago	
Christian Cullen	Full-back	Central Vikings	
Todd Miller	Full-back	Waikato	

=== England ===
England coach Clive Woodward named a 28-man training squad for their four tests in November and December.

Name	Position	Club	Notes
Lawrence Dallaglio	Back row	Wasps	Captain
Phil Greening	Hooker	Gloucester	
Andy Long	Hooker	Bath	
Mark Regan	Hooker	Bath	
Darren Garforth	Prop	Leicester	
Will Green	Prop	Wasps	
Jason Leonard	Prop	Harlequins	
Graham Rowntree	Prop	Leicester	
Garath Archer	Lock	Newcastle	
Danny Grewcock	Lock	Saracens	
Martin Johnson	Lock	Leicester	
Neil Back	Back row	Leicester	
Tony Diprose	Back row	Saracens	
Richard Hill	Back row	Saracens	
Tim Rodber	Back row	Northampton	
Kyran Bracken	Scrum-half	Saracens	
Matt Dawson	Scrum-half	Northampton	
Mike Catt	Fly-half	Bath	
Paul Grayson	Fly-half	Northampton	
Alex King	Fly-half	Wasps	
Phil de Glanville	Centre	Bath	
Will Greenwood	Centre	Leicester	
Adedayo Adebayo	Wing	Bath	
John Bentley	Wing	Newcastle	
David Rees	Wing	Sale	
Nick Beal	Full-back	Northampton	
Matt Perry	Full-back	Bath	
Tim Stimpson	Full-back	Newcastle	

=== Wales ===
Wales named a combined group of 52 covering both their senior team and the development squad for their November internationals. The most significant omission was their former captain, wing Ieuan Evans, but coach Kevin Bowring said this was for fitness reasons rather than Evans being on the verge of international retirement.

Name	Position	Club	Notes
Gwyn Jones	Back row	Cardiff	Captain
Jonathan Humphreys	Hooker	Cardiff	
Garin Jenkins	Hooker	Swansea	
Robin McBryde	Hooker	Llanelli	
Barry Williams	Hooker	Richmond	
Chris Anthony	Prop	Swansea	
Ian Buckett	Prop	Swansea	
Aled Griffiths	Prop	Pontypridd	
Andrew Lewis	Prop	Cardiff	
Christian Loader	Prop	Swansea	
Lyndon Mustoe	Prop	Cardiff	
Dai Young	Prop	Cardiff	
Ian Gough	Lock	Newport	
James Griffiths	Lock	Swansea	
Gareth Llewellyn	Lock	Harlequins	
Steve Moore	Lock	Moseley	
Craig Quinnell	Lock	Richmond	
Mark Rowley	Lock	Pontypridd	
Chris Stephens	Lock	Bridgend	
Mike Voyle	Lock	Llanelli	
Neil Watkins	Lock	Neath	
Rob Appleyard	Back row	Swansea	
Steve Gardner	Back row	Neath	
Hywel Jenkins	Back row	Llanelli	
Scott Quinnell	Back row	Richmond	
Mark Spiller	Back row	Pontypridd	
Nathan Thomas	Back row	Bath	
Martyn Williams	Back row	Pontypridd	
Steve Williams	Back row	Cardiff	
Chris Wyatt	Back row	Llanelli	
Huw Harries	Scrum-half	Harlequins	
Paul John	Scrum-half	Pontypridd	
Andy Moore	Scrum-half	Richmond	
Shaun Connor	Fly-half	Newport	
Byron Hayward	Fly-half	Ebbw Vale	
Lee Jarvis	Fly-half	Cardiff	
Neil Jenkins	Fly-half	Pontypridd	
Arwel Thomas	Fly-half	Swansea	
Allan Bateman	Centre	Richmond	
Neil Boobyer	Centre	Llanelli	
Leigh Davies	Centre	Cardiff	
Scott Gibbs	Centre	Swansea	
Jason Lewis	Centre	Pontypridd	
Martin Giraud	Wing	London Welsh	
Dafydd James	Wing	Pontypridd	
Rhys Shorney	Wing	UWIC	
Gareth Thomas	Wing	Bridgend	
Nigel Walker	Wing	Cardiff	
Gareth Wyatt	Wing	Pontypridd	
Matt Back	Full-back	Swansea	
Garan Evans	Full-back	Llanelli	
Kevin Morgan	Full-back	Pontypridd	
