= 1997 Tonga rugby union tour of Great Britain =

- Manager: S Kolokihakaufisi
- Tour captain: David Briggs
Summary
P	W	D	L
Total
12	5	1	6
Test match
1	0	0	1
Opponent
P	W	D	L
Wales
1	0	0	1

The 1997 Tonga rugby union tour of Great Britain was a series of matches played in October and November 1997 in Scotland, Wales and England Great Britain by Tonga national rugby union team.

== Fixtures ==
26 October 1997
14:30 GMT

Redruth Presidents Invitation XV	9–64	Tonga
Pen: Thirlby (3)		Try: Mafi (2); Tai (2); Tatafu (2); Fakaʻosiʻfolau; Matakaiongo; Molitika; Pohiva; Con: Tonga (7)

Recreation Ground, Redruth

29 October 1997
19:30 GMT

Bristol RFC	35–15	Tonga
Try: Hull; Breeze; Brownrigg; Tiueti; Bennett; Con: Armstrong (5)		Try: Fakaʻosiʻfolau (2); Con: Tonga; Pen: Tonga

Memorial Ground, Bristol

2 November 1997
14:15 GMT

Edinburgh	26–14	Tonga
Try: Burns; Clark; Reed; Con: Ross; Pen: Hodge (2); Drop: Ross		Try: Tanginoa (2); Con: Tonga (2)

Goldenacre, Edinburgh

5 November 1997
19:30 GMT

Oxford University RFC	16–31	Tonga
Try: Kelaher; Con: Kelaher; Pen: Kelaher (3)		Try: K. Tuʻipulotu; Con: Tonga; Pen: Tonga (8)

Iffley Road, Oxford

9 November 1997
15:00 GMT

Bridgend RFC	18–21	Tonga
Try: Boobyer; Greenaway; Con: Cull; Pen: Cull (2)		Try: Fakaosiʻfolau; S. Tuʻipulotu; Con: Tonga; Pen: Tonga (3)

Brewery Field, Bridgend

12 November 1997
15:00 GMT

Bath RFC	13–29	Tonga
Try: Tsimba (2); Drop: Balshaw		Try: Fakaosiʻfolau; Lotima; Mafileʻo; Tiueti; Con: Tai (2); Tonga; Drop: Lotima

Recreation Ground, Bath

16 November 1997
14:00 GMT

Wales	46–12	Tonga
Try: G. Thomas (2); Davies; Wyatt; Walker; Anthony; Con: Jenkins (2); Pen: Jenkins (4)		Try: Tatafu; Tai; Con: Tonga

St Helen's, Swansea
Referee: S. Borsani (Argentina)

FB	15	Gareth Wyatt
RW	14	Gareth Thomas	(substituted off) 70'
OC	13	Leigh Davies
IC	12	Scott Gibbs
LW	11	Nigel Walker
FH	10	Neil Jenkins
SH	9	Paul John	(substituted off) 56'
N8	8	Gwyn Jones (c)
OF	7	Nathan Thomas
BF	6	Rob Appleyard
RL	5	Mike Voyle
LL	4	Steve Moore	(substituted off) 74'
TP	3	Spencer John	(substituted off) 56'
HK	2	Barry Williams	(substituted off) 58'
LP	1	Christian Loader
Replacements:
PR	16	Chris Anthony	(substituted on) 56'
SH	17	Rob Howley	(substituted on) 56'
HK	18	Jonathan Humphreys	(substituted on) 58'
WG	19	Dafydd James	(substituted on) 70'
CE	20	SM Williams	(substituted on) 74'

FB	15	Gustavo Tonga
RW	14	Teviti Tiueti
OC	13	Fepikou Tatafu	(substituted off) 76'
IC	12	Peter Tanginoa
LW	11	Semisi Fakaʻosiʻfolau
FH	10	Josh Taumalolo
SH	9	Sione Tuʻipulotu
N8	8	Holani Pohiva	(substituted off) 64'
OF	7	Tomasi Matakaiongo	(substituted off) 57'
BF	6	Katelimoni Tuʻipulotu
RL	5	Kuli Faletau
LL	4	Saia Latu
TP	3	Nualu Taʻu
HK	2	Viliami Maʻasi
LP	1	David Briggs (c)	(substituted off) 40'
Replacements:
PR	16	Heamani Lavaka	(substituted on) 40'
FL	17	Maama Molitika	(substituted on) 57'
N8	18	Simon Hafoka	(substituted on) 64'
CE	19	Sione Tai	(substituted on) 76'
Coach:
(Tonga) L. Vikalani

18 November 1997
19:30 GMT

Blackheath F.C.	20–20	Tonga
Try: Peters; Pen: Braithwaite (5)		Try: Ahotaʻeʻiloa; Katoa; Tonga; Con: Tonga; Pen: Tonga

Rectory Field, Blackheath

20 November 1997
19:30 GMT

Sale F.C.	14–26	Tonga
Try: Mills; Pen: Davidson (3)		Try: Fakaʻosiʻfolau; Mafileʻo; Mafi; Matakaiongo; Con: Afeaki (3); Pen: Tonga

Heywood Road, Sale
Referee: Gordon Black

26 November 1997
20:00 GMT

Leeds	29–15	Tonga
Try: S Tuipulotu; Cawthorne; Wynn; Penalty try Con: S. Tuʻipulotu (2); Zoing; Pen: S. Tuʻipulotu		Try: Mafileʻo; Tanginoa; Con: Tonga; Pen: Tonga

Headingley Stadium, Leeds

30 November 1997
15:00 GMT

Saracens	83–8	Tonga
Try: Daniel (3); Constable (3); Pienaar (2); R Wallace (2); Ravenscroft; Watts; Bennett; Con: Singer (5); Lee; Pen: Lee (2)		Try: Hafoka; Pen: Tonga

Vicarage Road, Watford
