= 1996 Wales rugby union tour of Australia =

- Manager: Terry Cobner
- Coach: Kevin Bowring
- Tour captain: Jonathan Humphreys
Summary
P	W	D	L
Total
8	3	0	5
Test match
2	0	0	2
Opponent
P	W	D	L
Australia
2	0	0	2

Tour chronology
- ← 1995 South Africa 1997 North America →

The Wales national rugby union team toured Australia in May and June 1996, playing a series of eight matches, including two tests against the Australia national team (the Wallabies). After winning their first tour match against Western Australia, Wales then lost their next five matches, including the first test against Australia and the following match against Australia B. They then beat a New South Wales Country side and the Victoria state team, before finishing the tour with a second test defeat to the Wallabies. Several uncapped players were included in the touring squad, including lock Mike Voyle, who made his debut in the first test, and wing Dafydd James, who appeared in the second test.

== Squad ==
Name	Position	Club	Notes
Jonathan Humphreys	Hooker	Cardiff	Captain
Garin Jenkins	Hooker	Swansea	Withdrew due to injury
Barry Williams	Hooker	Neath	Injury replacement for Garin Jenkins
John Davies	Prop	Neath	
Andrew Lewis	Prop	Cardiff	
Christian Loader	Prop	Swansea	
Lyndon Mustoe	Prop	Cardiff	
Paul Arnold	Lock	Swansea	
Derwyn Jones	Lock	Cardiff	
Gareth Llewellyn	Lock	Harlequins	
Mike Voyle	Lock	Newport	
Andrew Gibbs	Back row	Newbridge	
Gwyn Jones	Back row	Llanelli	
Kingsley Jones	Back row	Ebbw Vale	
Emyr Lewis	Back row	Cardiff	
Hemi Taylor	Back row	Cardiff	
Steve Williams	Back row	Neath	
Rob Howley	Scrum-half	Bridgend	
Andy Moore	Scrum-half	Richmond	
Neil Jenkins	Fly-half	Pontypridd	
Arwel Thomas	Fly-half	Swansea	
Leigh Davies	Centre	Neath	
Nigel Davies	Centre	Llanelli	
John Funnell	Centre	Neath	
Gareth Thomas	Centre	Bridgend	
Ieuan Evans	Wing	Llanelli	
Steve Ford	Wing	Bridgend	
Simon Hill	Wing	Cardiff	
Dafydd James	Wing	Bridgend	
Wayne Proctor	Wing	Llanelli	
Crispin Cormack	Full-back	Pontypridd	

== Matches ==
Date	Venue	Home	Score	Away
29 May 1996	Perth	Western Australia	20–62	Wales
2 June 1996	Bruce Stadium, Canberra	Australian Capital Territory	69–30	Wales
5 June 1996	Sydney Football Stadium, Sydney	New South Wales	27–20	Wales
9 June 1996	Ballymore Oval, Brisbane	Australia	56–25	Wales
12 June 1996	Ballymore Oval, Brisbane	Australia B	51–41	Wales
15 June 1996	Weebollabolla Oval, Moree	New South Wales Country	3–49	Wales
18 June 1996	Olympic Park Stadium, Melbourne	Victoria	9–42	Wales
22 June 1996	Sydney Football Stadium, Sydney	Australia	42–3	Wales

=== Western Australia vs Wales ===
30 May 1996

Western Australia	20–62	Wales
Try: Thomas; Schaumkey; Con: Schaumkey (2); Pen: Schaumkey (2)		Try: G. Thomas (5); Hill (2); Moore; James; K. Jones; Con: N. Jenkins (6)

Perth

=== Australian Capital Territory vs Wales ===
2 June 1996

Australian Capital Territory	69–30	Wales
Try: Roff (4); Finegan; Gregan; Howard; Hardy; Larkham; Robinson; Con: Knox (8); Pen: Knox		Try: Howley (2); Hill; S. Williams; Con: N. Jenkins (2); Pen: N. Jenkins (2)

Bruce Stadium, Canberra

=== New South Wales vs Wales ===
5 June 1996

New South Wales	27–20	Wales
Try: Bond; Ekert; Con: Wallace; Pen: Wallace (5)		Try: Evans; N. Davies; Con: A. Thomas (2); Pen: A. Thomas (2)

Sydney Football Stadium, Sydney

=== Australia vs Wales (1st test) ===
8 June 1996

Australia	56–25	Wales
Try: Roff; Caputo; Wilson; Howard; Murdoch; Manu; Morgan; Con: Burke (6); Pen: Burke (3)		Try: Proctor; Evans; Llewellyn; Con: N. Jenkins (2); Pen: N. Jenkins (2)

Ballymore Stadium, Brisbane
Attendance: 24,000
Referee: Glenn Wahlstrom (New Zealand)

FB	15	Matt Burke
RW	14	Alistair Murdoch
OC	13	Tim Horan
IC	12	Joe Roff
LW	11	David Campese
FH	10	Pat Howard
SH	9	George Gregan
N8	8	Daniel Manu	Substituted off
OF	7	David Wilson
BF	6	Owen Finegan
RL	5	Garrick Morgan
LL	4	John Eales (c)
TP	3	Ewen McKenzie
HK	2	Marco Caputo
LP	1	Richard Harry
Replacements:
FB	16	Stephen Larkham
FH	17	Scott Bowen
SH	18	Sam Payne
N8	19	Michael Brial	Substituted on
PR	20	Dan Crowley
HK	21	Michael Foley
Coach:
(Australia) Greg Smith

FB	15	Wayne Proctor
RW	14	Ieuan Evans
OC	13	Leigh Davies
IC	12	Nigel Davies
LW	11	Gareth Thomas
FH	10	Neil Jenkins
SH	9	Rob Howley
N8	8	Steve Williams
OF	7	Gwyn Jones	Substituted off	Substituted on
BF	6	Hemi Taylor
RL	5	Derwyn Jones			Substituted off
LL	4	Gareth Llewellyn
TP	3	John Davies	Substituted off
HK	2	Jonathan Humphreys (c)
LP	1	Christian Loader
Replacements:
WG	16	Simon Hill
FH	17	Arwel Thomas
SH	18	Andy Moore
LK	19	Mike Voyle	Substituted on	Substituted off	Substituted on
PR	20	Lyndon Mustoe	Substituted on
HK	21	Barry Williams
Coach:
Kevin Bowring

=== Australia B vs Wales ===
12 June 1996

Australia B	51–41	Wales
Try: Herbert (3); Larkham (2); Brial; Gavin; Hardy; Payne; Con: Bowen (2); Payne		Try: Gibbs; James; Moore; Proctor; A. Thomas; G. Thomas; Con: A. Thomas (4); Pen: A. Thomas

Ballymore Stadium, Brisbane

=== New South Wales Country vs Wales ===
15 June 1996

New South Wales Country	3–49	Wales
Pen: Lavelle	Report	Try: Cormack (2); Evans; S. Williams; J. Davies; Hill; N. Davies; Con: N. Jenkins (4); Pen: N. Jenkins (2)

Weebollabolla Oval, Moree

=== Victoria vs Wales ===
18 June 1996

Victoria	9–42	Wales
Pen: Hendry (3)		Try: Cormack (3); Proctor; Voyle; Gibbs; Moore; Con: A. Thomas (2); Pen: A. Thomas

Olympic Park Stadium, Melbourne

=== Australia vs Wales (2nd test) ===
22 June 1996

Australia	42–3	Wales
Try: Finegan; Burke; Roff; Foley; Morgan; Horan; Con: Burke (2); Eales; Pen: Burke (2)		Pen: N. Jenkins

Sydney Football Stadium, Sydney
Attendance: 35,784
Referee: Colin Hawke (New Zealand)

FB	15	Matt Burke	Substituted off
RW	14	David Campese
OC	13	Joe Roff
IC	12	Tim Horan
LW	11	Ben Tune
FH	10	Pat Howard
SH	9	Sam Payne
N8	8	Michael Brial
OF	7	David Wilson
BF	6	Owen Finegan
RL	5	Garrick Morgan
LL	4	John Eales (c)
TP	3	Ewen McKenzie	Substituted off
HK	2	Marco Caputo	Substituted off
LP	1	Richard Harry
Replacements:
PR		Dan Crowley	Substituted on
HK		Michael Foley	Substituted on	Substituted off
FB		Stephen Larkham	Substituted on
FL		Daniel Manu		Substituted on
Coach:
(Australia) Greg Smith

FB	15	Wayne Proctor
RW	14	Ieuan Evans
OC	13	Nigel Davies	Substituted off
IC	12	Gareth Thomas
LW	11	Simon Hill
FH	10	Neil Jenkins
SH	9	Rob Howley
N8	8	Hemi Taylor
OF	7	Steve Williams
BF	6	Andrew Gibbs
RL	5	Derwyn Jones
LL	4	Gareth Llewellyn
TP	3	Lyndon Mustoe
HK	2	Jonathan Humphreys (c)
LP	1	Christian Loader	Substituted off	Substituted on
Replacements:
PR		Andrew Lewis	Substituted on	Substituted off
WG		Dafydd James	Substituted on
Coach:
Kevin Bowring

== See also ==
- History of rugby union matches between Australia and Wales
