= 1997 Five Nations Championship squads =

Rugby union competition squads

This is a list of 1997 Five Nations Championship squads. It includes a list of all of the players in each squad for the Five Nations Championship held in 1997.

== England ==
Head coach: Jack Rowell

1. Rob Andrew
2. Will Carling
3. Mike Catt
4. Ben Clarke
5. Lawrence Dallaglio
6. Phil de Glanville (c)
7. Darren Garforth
8. Andy Gomarsall
9. Paul Grayson
10. Phil Greening
11. Jeremy Guscott
12. Austin Healey
13. Richard Hill
14. Martin Johnson
15. Jason Leonard
16. Mark Regan
17. Tim Rodber
18. Graham Rowntree
19. Simon Shaw
20. Chris Sheasby
21. Jon Sleightholme
22. Tim Stimpson
23. Tony Underwood

== France ==
Head coach: Jean-Claude Skrela

1. Guy Accoceberry
2. David Aucagne
3. Abdelatif Benazzi (c)
4. Philippe Benetton
5. Pierre Bondouy
6. Christian Califano
7. Philippe Carbonneau
8. Thomas Castaignède
9. Richard Castel
10. Marc Dal Maso
11. Marc de Rougemont
12. Richard Dourthe
13. Fabien Galthié
14. Stéphane Glas
15. Raphaël Ibañez
16. Jean-Louis Jordana
17. Christophe Lamaison
18. Laurent Leflamand
19. Olivier Magne
20. Olivier Merle
21. Hugues Miorin
22. Ugo Mola
23. Émile Ntamack
24. Fabien Pelous
25. Alain Penaud
26. Jean-Luc Sadourny
27. Franck Tournaire
28. David Venditti

== Ireland ==
Head coach: Brian Ashton

1. Jonny Bell
2. Paul Burke
3. Shane Byrne
4. Allen Clarke
5. David Corkery
6. Ben Cronin
7. Dominic Crotty
8. Jeremy Davidson
9. Eric Elwood
10. Maurice Field
11. Paul Flavin
12. Anthony Foley
13. Gabriel Fulcher
14. Denis Hickie
15. Niall Hogan
16. David Humphreys
17. Paddy Johns
18. Denis McBride
19. Stephen McIvor
20. Kurt McQuilkin
21. Eric Miller
22. Ross Nesdale
23. Brian O'Meara
24. Conor O'Shea
25. Nick Popplewell
26. Jim Staples (c)
27. James Topping
28. Paul Wallace
29. Richard Wallace
30. Keith Wood (c)*

*captain in the first game

== Scotland ==
Head coach: Jim Telfer

1. Gary Armstrong
2. Steve Brotherstone
3. Craig Chalmers
4. Damian Cronin
5. Graham Ellis
6. Ronnie Eriksson
7. Cameron Glasgow
8. Scott Hastings
9. David Hilton
10. Duncan Hodge
11. Kenny Logan
12. Shade Munro
13. Bryan Redpath
14. Andy Reed
15. Rowen Shepherd
16. Ian Smith
17. Tom Smith
18. Tony Stanger
19. Derek Stark
20. Mattie Stewart
21. Alan Tait
22. Gregor Townsend
23. Rob Wainwright (c)
24. Murray Wallace
25. Peter Walton
26. Doddie Weir

== Wales ==
Head coach: Kevin Bowring

1. Allan Bateman
2. Colin Charvis
3. Jonathan Davies
4. Nigel Davies
5. Ieuan Evans
6. Scott Gibbs
7. Simon Hill
8. Rob Howley
9. Jonathan Humphreys (c)
10. Dafydd James
11. Garin Jenkins
12. Neil Jenkins
13. Paul John
14. Spencer John
15. Gwyn Jones
16. Kingsley Jones
17. Gareth Llewellyn
18. Christian Loader
19. Dale McIntosh
20. Lyndon Mustoe
21. Wayne Proctor
22. Craig Quinnell
23. Scott Quinnell
24. Mark Rowley
25. Arwel Thomas
26. Gareth Thomas
27. Mike Voyle
28. Steve Williams
29. David Young
