= 1996 Five Nations Championship squads =

Rugby union competition squads

== England ==
Head coach: Jack Rowell

1. Garath Archer
2. Martin Bayfield
3. Kyran Bracken
4. Jonathan Callard
5. Will Carling (c)
6. Mike Catt
7. Ben Clarke
8. Lawrence Dallaglio
9. Graham Dawe
10. Matt Dawson
11. Phil de Glanville
12. Paul Grayson
13. Jeremy Guscott
14. Martin Johnson
15. Jason Leonard
16. Steve Ojomoh
17. Mark Regan
18. Dean Richards
19. Tim Rodber
20. Graham Rowntree
21. Jon Sleightholme
22. Victor Ubogu
23. Rory Underwood

== France ==
Head coach: Jean-Claude Skrela

1. Guy Accoceberry
2. Abdelatif Benazzi
3. Philippe Bernat-Salles
4. Olivier Brouzet
5. Laurent Cabannes
6. Christian Califano
7. Olivier Campan
8. Philippe Carbonneau
9. Thomas Castaignède
10. Richard Castel
11. Marc de Rougemont
12. Sylvain Dispagne
13. Richard Dourthe
14. Fabien Galthié
15. Stéphane Glas
16. Jean-Michel Gonzales
17. Raphaël Ibañez
18. Thierry Lacroix
19. Olivier Merle
20. Émile Ntamack
21. Fabien Pelous
22. Alain Penaud
23. Michel Perie
24. Olivier Roumat
25. Jean-Luc Sadourny
26. Philippe Saint-André (c)
27. Franck Tournaire

== Ireland ==
Head coach: Murray Kidd

1. Jonny Bell
2. Paul Burke
3. Allen Clarke
4. Peter Clohessy
5. David Corkery
6. Victor Costello
7. Jeremy Davidson
8. Eric Elwood
9. Maurice Field
10. Neil Francis
11. Gabriel Fulcher
12. Simon Geoghegan
13. Niall Hogan (c)**
14. David Humphreys
15. Henry Hurley
16. Paddy Johns
17. Terry Kingston
18. Simon Mason
19. Denis McBride
20. Mark McCall
21. Kurt McQuilkin
22. Nick Popplewell
23. Chris Saverimutto
24. Jim Staples (c)*
25. Paul Wallace
26. Richard Wallace
27. Niall Woods

*captain in the first two games

**captain the last two games

== Scotland ==
Head coach: Jim Telfer

1. Stewart Campbell
2. Michael Dods
3. Scott Hastings
4. David Hilton
5. Ian Jardine
6. Craig Joiner
7. Kenny Logan
8. Kevin McKenzie
9. Eric Peters
10. Bryan Redpath
11. Rowen Shepherd
12. Ian Smith
13. Gregor Townsend
14. Rob Wainwright (c)
15. Doddie Weir
16. Peter Wright

== Wales ==
Head coach: Kevin Bowring

1. John D. Davies
2. Leigh Davies
3. Nigel Davies
4. Ieuan Evans
5. Rob Howley
6. Jonathan Humphreys (c)
7. Garin Jenkins
8. Neil Jenkins
9. Derwyn Jones
10. Gwyn Jones
11. Andrew Lewis
12. Emyr Lewis
13. Gareth Llewellyn
14. Christian Loader
15. Wayne Proctor
16. Hemi Taylor
17. Arwel Thomas
18. Gareth Thomas
19. Justin Thomas
20. Steve Williams
