= Richard Bryan (disambiguation) =

Richard Bryan (born 1937) is an American attorney and politician.

Richard Bryan may also refer to:

- Richard Bryan (MP), Member of Parliament (MP) for Lostwithiel
- Richard Bryan (rugby union) (born 1977), English rugby union player

== See also ==
- Rick Bryan (1962–2009), American football player
