= Dan Griffiths =

Dan Griffiths may refer to:

- Dan Griffiths (rugby union, born 1857) (1857–1936), Welsh rugby union forward
- Dan Griffiths (rugby union, born 1979), Welsh rugby union fly-half
