= North Wales rugby =

North Wales
- Full name: North Wales Rugby Union
- Nickname(s): The Gogs
- Location: North Wales
- Ground(s): Various

North Wales Rugby (Welsh: Rygbi Gogledd Cymru) was a representative rugby union team representing Wales. They competed annually in the Welsh County Championship and represented the region against international touring teams including Tonga, Romania, Japan and Western Samoa.

At age-grade level, they competed twice against the touring New Zealand under-21 side.

The first notable player from North Wales was D. M. Johnston of the ship school HMS Conway on Anglesey, who toured South Africa in 1956 with Welsh Schoolboys. The tour party, who lost one game on the eight-match tour, included Clive Rowlands who went on to gain senior Wales caps.

In December 2009, at a Welsh Rugby Union press conference held at Ruthin Castle, they were formally replaced by the new developmental regional rugby union team for North Wales RGC 1404.

== Partial list of games played against international opposition ==
Year	Date	Opponent	Venue	Result	Score	Tour
1974	21 September	Tonga	Rhyl	Win	12–3	1974 Tonga rugby union tour
1979	29 September	Romania	Eirias Park, Colwyn Bay	Loss	15–38	1979 Romania rugby union tour of Wales
1988	19 October	Samoa	Wrexham	Loss	12–24	1988 Western Samoa rugby union tour of Britain and Ireland

== North Wales international players ==
- (Wales) Jake Ball
- (Wales) Dewi Bebb
- (Wales) Ian Buckett
- (Wales) Alex Cuthbert
- (Wales) Godfrey Darbishire
- (Wales) Arthur Emyr
- (Wales) Tony Gray
- (Wales) James King
- (Wales) Robin McBryde
- (Wales) Rob McCusker
- (Wales) Andrew Moore
- (Wales) Steve Moore
- (Wales) Bill Morris
- (Wales) George North
- (Wales) Meirion Roberts
- (Wales) Mike Roberts
- (Wales) Stuart Roy
- (Wales) Charles Taylor
- (Wales) Hugh Vincent
- (England) Dorian West
- (United States) Mark Williams
- (Wales) Wilf Wooller
