= Forbury =

In general, a forbury is an area in front of or adjacent to the boundary of a mediaeval monastery, and means 'borough in front'.

Specifically it may refer to:

- Forbury Gardens, a public garden in the English town of Reading formerly known as the Forbury
- Forbury CRE Software, an Australian provider of commercial real estate valuation software
- Forbury, New Zealand, a suburb of the New Zealand city of Dunedin named after the Reading Forbury

== See also ==
- Forbury Park Raceway, a former horseracing venue in the New Zealand city of Dunedin
