= Leighton Samuel =

Welsh businessman

Leighton Samuel is a Welsh businessman, and former owner of several sporting teams in South Wales.

In 1988, Samuel founded picture frame manufacturer Décor Frame, now Dekor plc, in Bridgend, South Wales.

== Bridgend RFC & Celtic Warriors ==
Samuel purchased Bridgend RFC in the mid-1990s.

He attempted to merge them with Neath in 2002. Bridgend won the Welsh Championship in 2003.

In the summer of 2003, the Welsh Rugby Union (WRU) voted to reduce the top tier of Welsh rugby union from nine clubs in the Celtic League into five regions through a series of mergers. The new Celtic Warriors officially represented the Mid-Glamorgan Valleys area, which in practice meant that they were a combination of Pontypridd RFC and Bridgend RFC with the two parent clubs continuing in the Welsh Premier Division. Games were to be rotated between Pontypridd's Sardis Road and Bridgend's Brewery Field.

To concentrate on the Celtic Warriors, Samuel decided to withdraw his financial backing of Bridgend RFC in March 2004. The original club was finally wound up by HM Revenue and Customs in 2006. Fans and businessmen of the area resurrected the team, naming it Bridgend Ravens as the name Bridgend RFC was still owned by Samuel.

Financial problems at Pontypridd RFC led to the sale of their half of the Warriors to Leighton Samuel for £100,000; which he gifted to the WRU, his attempt to become sole owner of the club having been blocked by the WRU.

Samuel's attempt to buy Sardis Road's ground lease to be an all-seater stadium for the Celtic Warriors was rejected by the Pontypridd's trustees. Games were moved away from Sardis Road to Brewery Field on commercial grounds, which led to threats of legal action from Pontypridd Supporters Club.

Plans to merge Warriors with Cardiff Blues collapsed when Cardiff Athletic Club, the largest shareholders in Cardiff RFC made it clear they would not allow a combined side to use the Arms Park. The merger talks had attracted protests from both sets of fans.

Trouble followed in the spring and early summer of 2004 where Leighton Samuel repeatedly threatened and revoked threats of selling the club; one such instance went as far as Samuel accepting an offer from the WRU citing a lack of support from fans in the new Bridgend/Pontypridd region, before changing his mind. This transaction was considered to be legally binding, and the Warriors became 100% owned by the WRU. On the advice of David Moffett who cited spiralling debts, the club was dissolved with Leighton Samuel reportedly receiving £875,000 for his shares.

Samuel alleged that he only sold his share in the Warriors to the WRU because they agreed to keep the region going. The WRU denied this but Leighton Samuel took them to court claiming a misrepresentation of sale and loss of earnings from Brewery Field which he still owned. The WRU settled out of court.

== Pontypridd Town AFC ==
Samuel invested in Pontypridd Town A.F.C. who were playing in Welsh league division 1 with the ambition of promotion to the League of Wales. However, they failed to win promotion and Samuel withdrew his support and the club were subsequently relegated down to Welsh Football League Division Three.

== Celtic Crusaders ==
Samuel was approached by the Rugby Football League in 2004 to start up Celtic Crusaders rugby league club in Bridgend, the only professional rugby league club in Wales. Celtic Crusaders were initially successful; winning promotion in their second season and being awarded a Super League licence in their third year.

Crusaders struggled on the field and only won three games all season. They were also investigated by the UK Borders Authority for employing six players illegally on working holiday and student visas. The six players were later deported and the club was fined £5,000 after providing evidence that checks were made on five of the players before employing them.

In February 2009, Samuel reaffirmed his continued interest in the club. He then sold Brewery Field stadium in March 2009 and decided to relocate the club to Rodney Parade, Newport for two years while a suitable venue in Bridgend was constructed.

Leighton Samuel sold his interest in Crusaders to Wrexham Village in December 2009 and the club moved to Wrexham in North Wales. Samuel claimed to have put £1.64 million into the club and that the club was relatively free of debt.

Crusaders had a much better season finishing eighth in the Super League table and making the play-offs but ran into financial problems at the end of the season. By August 2010, documents showed that there were 18 county court cases against Crusaders, the earliest being December 2006. According to The Sun newspaper, Crusaders went into administration on 2 November 2010 after Samuel served a writ on the Welsh club for £360,000. However, Samuel denied this in a statement to the BBC: "It's rubbish. It's absolute rubbish. It's news to me. I've not served a writ. There is toing and froing regarding the transfer of the business but I've taken no legal action".

The GMB Union stated that they were taking action on behalf of players over alleged missing pensions payments on 12 November 2010. By the end of November, Crusaders finally did go into administration with debts thought to amount to around £1.25 million, most of them inherited from their time in South Wales.
