= Maama Molitika =

Tonga international rugby union player

- Born: Maama Kalafi Molitika; 26 August 1974 (age 52) Ha'apai, Tonga
- Height: 6 ft 5 in (1.96 m)
- Weight: 238 lb (108 kg)

Rugby union career
- Position(s): Flanker, Number Eight
Senior career
| Years | Team | Apps | (Points) |
| 2001–2003 | Bridgend | 11 | (10) |
| 2003–2004 | Celtic Warriors | 4 | (2) |
| 2004–2005 | Harlequin F.C. | 10 | |
| 2006–2007 | IBM Big Blue | 112 | (85) |
| 2007–2012 | Cardiff Blues | 21 | (10) |
| 2012–2013 | Rugby San Donà | | |
| 2013–2020 | Ampthill | | |
International career
| Years | Team | Apps | (Points) |
| 1997–2007 | Tonga | 18 | (5) |
| 2006 | Pacific Islanders | 3 | (0) |

Maama Molitika (26 August 1974) is a Tongan former rugby union footballer. He is 6'5". He has played numerous times for the national Tongan team, making his debut in June 1997 against Fiji. He was also in the Pacific Islanders rugby union team squad that toured Europe in 2006. He played as a blind-side flanker.

Molitika was born in Haʻapai in Tonga and moved to new Zealand as a teenager. After playing rugby at school in new Zealand, he returned to Tonga in 1996 for a holiday, and was invited to train with the national side.

In 2002–03 he was Bridgend's joint top try scorer of the season, and was a part of the team that went on to win the Welsh Premiership for the first time in the club's history. Following the regionalisation of Welsh rugby in 2003–04, he joined the now defunct Celtic Warriors, and played the one season that the region existed for, including playing for them in the Heineken Cup. After the Warriors were dissolved at the end of the 2003–04 season, he signed to play for Harlequin F.C. in the English Premiership. He then moved to Welsh region the Cardiff Blues.

In 2006 he went to Japan and played for Japanese team IBM Big Blue.

However, it was announced in 2007 that he would be returning to the Cardiff Blues to cover for players that would be absent due to Wales' World Cup campaign, as well as covering for any injured players.

On his return to the Cardiff Blues, Molitika dispelled previous concerns that his standard of play would have decreased from a year in the less-competitive Japanese League, with some outstanding performances for the Cardiff Blues. Molitika had established himself as the teams' first-choice flanker with his effective ball-carrying and his tireless work-rate winning much praise from coaches and fans alike.

In the 2012-13 season, Molitika was hired by the Rugby San Donà, a newly promoted Italian team that has recently won the Serie A 2011-2012.

Maama also has a brother, Haloti Molitika, who is currently playing for Worcester Rugby Club's Academy side.

Maama also coached local rugby Team Sully Sports Rfc who play in the WRU Div 7 league and university side Bedfordshire Bull's Luton campus team.

Molitika retired from rugby in 2020.
