= Richard Bryan (rugby union) =

- Born: 21 January 1977 (age 49) Bristol

Rugby union career
- Position: Back row
Senior career
Years	Team	Apps	(Points)
- Bath Rugby
- Bridgend RFC
- Celtic Warriors
- Newport Gwent Dragons
2006–	Leeds Carnegie		

Richard Bryan (born 21 January 1977) is a former rugby union footballer for Leeds Carnegie (later Yorkshire Carnegie). He is currently the Player Welfare Director for the Rugby Players Association, having previously been a Player Development Manager.

His usual position was at the back row .

Bryan began his career with Bath Rugby before moving on to skipper Bridgend. At the Brewery Field he led the club to the last Welsh Premiership title before the introduction of regional rugby with 13 league wins in 14 games. He also played five times in the Heineken Cup .

With the introduction of regional teams he was drafted into the Celtic Warriors side along with former Tyke Richard Parks . He moved to Newport following the demise of the Warriors in 2004 and made 23 appearances in the Celtic League in two seasons. Bryan took over the captaincy duties from Jason Forster .

In 2004, Bryan wondered whether he had any future in the game after clutching his knee in agony on the Rodney Parade pitch after falling awkwardly near the end of a game against Edinburgh. A cruciate ligament had gone in the knee and a complete reconstruction was required with no certainty about the outcome. He soon recovered and he made a full return to the Newport side.

In 2006, Leeds Tykes signed Bryan from Newport Gwent Dragons in May 2006. He made his Tykes début against Nottingham R.F.C. on 1 October 2006 at Meadow Lane as a replacement in a 37–30 victory.

He joined the RPA back in 2011. As Player Welfare Director, Bryan leads on a number of projects, with the players voice at the key of it. In January 2024, he was instrumental in winning protective award compensation for members at Wasps, Worcester Warriors and London Irish.
