= Gerald Williams (rugby union) =

- Born: 21 October 1954 (age 72) Swansea, Wales

Rugby union career
- Position: Scrum-half
International career
Years	Team	Apps	(Points)
1981–82	Wales	4	(0)

Gerald Williams (born 21 October 1954) is a Welsh former rugby union international.

Born in Swansea, Williams attended Heol Gam Comprehensive School.

Williams was a scrum-half, who played a lot of his rugby with Bridgend RFC, notably captaining them to a win over Australia at Brewery Field in 1981. He gained four Wales caps across the 1981 and 1982 Five Nations Championships.

Retiring as a player at age 34, Williams was briefly coach of the Glamorgan Wanderers.

Williams joined South Wales Police in 1989, initially as a crime scene investigator, before beginning a long career as a fingerprint laboratory technician two years later. He was involved in investigating the scene of the Clydach murders.

== See also ==
- List of Wales national rugby union players
