= James Griffiths (rugby union) =

Wales international rugby union footballer

- Born: James Griffiths; 3 January 1977 (age 49) Glanaman, Wales
- Height: 2.01 m (6 ft 7 in)
- Weight: 110.5 kg (17 st 6 lb)

Rugby union career
- Position: lock
Senior career
Years	Team	Apps	(Points)
1996–2003	Swansea RFC		
–	Aberavon RFC		
Provincial / State sides
Years	Team	Apps	(Points)
- Scarlets
International career
Years	Team	Apps	(Points)
2000	Wales	1	(0)

James Griffiths (born 3 January 1977) is a Welsh international rugby union player who played club rugby for Swansea RFC. Griffiths has played over 125 games for Swansea, and made his only international appearance against Samoa in 2000. In 2003 he played regional rugby for the Scarlets.
