= Ray Lehner =

US international rugby union player

- Full name: Raymond Paul Lehner
- Born: March 13, 1972 (age 54) Sacramento, United States
- Height: 6 ft 1 in (185 cm)
- Weight: 241 lb (109 kg)
- School: Jesuit High School
- University: UC Berkeley / Oxford University

Rugby union career
- Position: Prop
International career
Years	Team	Apps	(Points)
1995–00	United States	37	(0)

Raymond Paul Lehner (born March 13, 1972) is an American former rugby union international.

== Biography ==
Lehner was born in Sacramento and attended Jesuit High School. He went on to play rugby with the Golden Bears of UC Berkeley, featuring in their 1991, 1992 and 1993 Division I championship teams. A prop, Lehner gained 37 caps playing for the United States from 1995 to 2000, which included two appearances at the 1999 Rugby World Cup. He played rugby for Oxford University RFC while studying at Kellogg College, Oxford and earned four blues.

== See also ==
- List of United States national rugby union players
