= Jay Wilkerson =

US international rugby union player

- Full name: Jay Parks Wilkerson
- Born: January 25, 1966 (age 60) Lakewood, Colorado, U.S.
- Height: 6 ft 2 in (188 cm)
- Weight: 220 lb (100 kg)
- School: Mater Dei High School
- University: Fresno State University

Rugby union career
- Position: Flanker
International career
Years	Team	Apps	(Points)
1991–98	United States	17	(5)

Jay Parks Wilkerson (born January 25, 1966) is a former American football and rugby union player.

== Biography ==
Raised in Newport Beach, California, Wilkerson was a football linebacker at Mater Dei High School, earning All-County and All-Angelus League honors his senior year. He continued to play football at Saddleback College and as a sophomore was MVP in the team's win over Fullerton in the Orange County Pony Bowl. In 1986, Wilkerson took up a football scholarship to Fresno State University, where he played for two years. He was briefly on the books of the Los Angeles Rams.

Wilkerson picked up rugby union in 1989 while at Fresno State University and had a quick rise up the ranks, touring Australia with the national team a year later. He was an uncapped member of the Eagles' 1991 Rugby World Cup squad and made his international debut in the match against host nation England at Twickenham. From 1991 to 1998, Wilkerson was capped 17 times in total for his country, used mainly as a flanker. He played his club rugby for Belmont Shore and during the late 1990s had a stint in Welsh rugby with Dunvant.

== See also ==
- List of United States national rugby union players
