= Simon Hafoka =

Simon Hafoka (born 1974) is a professional rugby player and coach who played international rugby for Tonga. He grew up in Auckland, New Zealand and attended St Peter's College. Hafoka's playing position is as hooker/backrow forward. He has also played Rugby 7s for the Fiji Spartans 7s team in the UK, Ireland and Portugal. Hafoka spent some years playing professional rugby for Independiente Rugby Club Santander.Simon was player/Head Coach for Oviedo Rugby Club for 3 seasons and in January 2017 was asked to coach Getxo Rugby Club in the Division de Honor. Hafoka saved them from relegation. He has for the past 5 years been working as a Physical Education Teacher in Santander, Spain. Hafoka is also a J9 World Legend player that plays regularly in Dubai.The J9 Foundation is the foundation set up by the late Joost van der Westhuizen. Raising awareness for motor neurone disease (The famous South African Rugby Captain)
