= Matt Alexander (rugby union) =

US international rugby union player

- Born: December 5, 1966 (age 59) South Africa
- Height: 6 ft 0 in (183 cm)
- Weight: 185 lb (84 kg)

Rugby union career
- Position: Fly-half
Amateur team(s)
Years	Team	Apps	(Points)
2013	Ontario Blues		
Senior career
Years	Team	Apps	(Points)
- Sale Sharks
1995–1999	Denver Barbarians RFC		
International career
Years	Team	Apps	(Points)
1995–1998	United States	24	(286)

Matt Alexander (born December 5, 1966) is a former professional rugby union player who played at fly-half for the United States national team and English club Sale Sharks.

== Early life and career ==
Alexander was born in South Africa on December 5, 1966. He began his professional playing career in rugby for the Sale Sharks, a professional rugby union club from Greater Manchester, England.

Alexander debuted for the United States national rugby union team on September 5, 1995. He made 24 official appearances for the USA Eagles and is third on their list of all-time leading scorers with 286 points.

== See also ==
- United States national rugby union team
