= Kurt Shuman =

US international rugby union player

- Full name: Kurt Daniel Shuman
- Born: January 5, 1974 (age 52)
- Height: 6 ft 1 in (185 cm)
- Weight: 202 lb (92 kg)
- University: Pennsylvania State University; Oxford University

Rugby union career
- Position: Fullback
International career
Years	Team	Apps	(Points)
1997–01	United States	29	(15)

Kurt Daniel Shuman (born January 5, 1974) is an American former international rugby union player.

== Biography ==
Shuman, a native of Rockville, Maryland, was a Penn State varsity captain and could play as a fly-half or fullback.

Capped 29 times, Shuman competed on the United States national team between 1997 and 2001. He was used in Test rugby as a fullback and featured in all three of America's pool matches at the 1999 Rugby World Cup, where they were grouped with Australia, Ireland and Romania. His 78th-minute try against Romania may have earned them a draw had Kevin Dalzell been accurate with his sideline conversion.

Shuman undertook postgraduate studies at Oxford University and was awarded a rugby blue.

== See also ==
- List of United States national rugby union players
