= Christopher Lippert =

US international rugby union player

- Born: March 31, 1963 (age 63) California, U.S.
- Occupation(s): Rugby player, coach

Rugby union career
- Position: Prop
Senior career
Years	Team	Apps	(Points)
	Barbarian F.C.	3	
1989–1996	OMBAC		
International career
Years	Team	Apps	(Points)
1989–1998	United States	38	(0)

Christopher Lippert (known as Chris Lippert; born March 31, 1963) is an American retired rugby union player who played at prop for the United States national rugby union team and the Barbarian F.C.

== Early life and career ==
Lippert was born in San Diego, California, U.S., on March 31, 1963. Lippert debuted for the United States national rugby union team on September 23, 1989. He made a total of 38 test appearances for the USA Eagles, including the 1991 Rugby World Cup, and captained the team in the 1996 Pan-American Championship. Lippert played 3 matches for the Barbarian F.C. He was an All-American and won a National Championship with San Diego State University in 1987. He also won five national titles from 1989 to 1996 while playing as a front-row stalwart for the Old Mission Beach Athletic Club.

Lippert was the first USA player to surpass 36 caps and his 38 caps was a national record when he retired in 1998.

== Coaching career ==
After retiring from professional rugby, Lippert served as the Manager for the United States national rugby sevens team and for the USA Eagles 15's, including the 2003 Rugby World Cup.

== Awards ==
Lippert was inducted into the U.S. Rugby Hall of Fame in 2020.

== See also ==
- United States national rugby union team
