= Tomasi Takau =

US international rugby union player

- Full name: Tomasi Zundel Takau
- Born: October 15, 1968 Neiafu, Vavaʻu, Tonga
- Died: July 29, 2021 (aged 52) St. George, Utah, U.S.
- Height: 5 ft 11 in (180 cm)
- Weight: 210 lb (95 kg)
- University: BYU–Hawaii

Rugby union career
- Position: Center
International career
Years	Team	Apps	(Points)
1994–99	United States	25	(30)

Tomasi Zundel Takau (October 15, 1968 – July 29, 2021) was a Tongan-American international rugby union player.

Born and raised in Tonga, Takau hailed from the island of Vavaʻu and picked up rugby in junior high school.

Takau, a center, played rugby with BYU–Hawaii and was a member of the United States national team from 1994 to 1999, gaining 25 caps. He bowed out of international rugby with three appearances at the 1999 Rugby World Cup and continued playing with Gentlemen of Aspen, where he featured in their famed side that won seven successive national titles.

In 2021, Takau died of COVID-19 related complications.

== See also ==
- List of United States national rugby union players
