= Mark Scharrenberg =

American rugby union player (born 1969)

- Full name: Mark Andrew Scharrenberg
- Born: April 30, 1969 (age 57)
- Height: 5 ft 11 in (180 cm)
- Weight: 200 lb (91 kg)
- School: Saint Francis High School
- University: Chico State University

Rugby union career
- Position: Center
International career
Years	Team	Apps	(Points)
1993–99	United States	39	(40)

Mark Andrew Scharrenberg (born April 30, 1969) is an American former international rugby union player.

Raised in California, Scharrenberg was a football running back at Saint Francis High School and played on the 1984 Central Coast Section championship team. He was named All-CCS and West Catholic Athletic League player of the year in 1986. Going on to attend Chico State University, Scharrenberg was a Division II football player and also took up rugby for the Wildcats, becoming their first All-American rugby player in 1993.

Scharrenberg, a center, played rugby for San Francisco Golden Gate and was a member of the U.S. national team from 1993 to 1999. He scored an important try against Uruguay that helped the United States qualify for the 1999 Rugby World Cup, where he bowed out of international rugby by appearing in all pool matches, to finish with 39 caps. Outside of Test rugby, Scharrenberg also competed overseas in club rugby for Jed-Forest in Scotland and Reading in England.

== See also ==
- List of United States national rugby union players
