= David Briggs (rugby union) =

New Zealand rugby union player (born 1970)

- Full name: David Joseph Briggs
- Born: 21 June 1970 (age 56) Auckland, New Zealand
- Height: 6 ft 1 in (185 cm)
- Weight: 244 lb (111 kg)

Rugby union career
- Position: Prop
Provincial / State sides
Years	Team	Apps	(Points)
1997–04	Waikato	86	(55)
2006	Hawke's Bay	5	(0)
Super Rugby
Years	Team	Apps	(Points)
1999–03	Chiefs	31	(0)
International career
Years	Team	Apps	(Points)
1997	Tonga	1	(0)

David Joseph Briggs (born 21 June 1970) is a New Zealand former professional rugby union player.

== Biography ==
Born to a Tongan father and Maori mother, Briggs grew up in the small community of Taharoa in Waikato.

Briggs was a prop, capped for Tonga on their 1997 tour of Great Britain, captaining the side in a Test against Wales at St Helen's. Further international opportunities were knocked back due to his focus on professional rugby.

A Waikato player, Briggs's form had him keeping Chiefs captain Michael Collins out of the provincial line-up in 1999 and the next year he got his first start in the Chiefs XV. He made a total of 31 Super 12 appearances for the Chiefs.
