= Steve Surridge =

New Zealand rugby union player (born 1970)

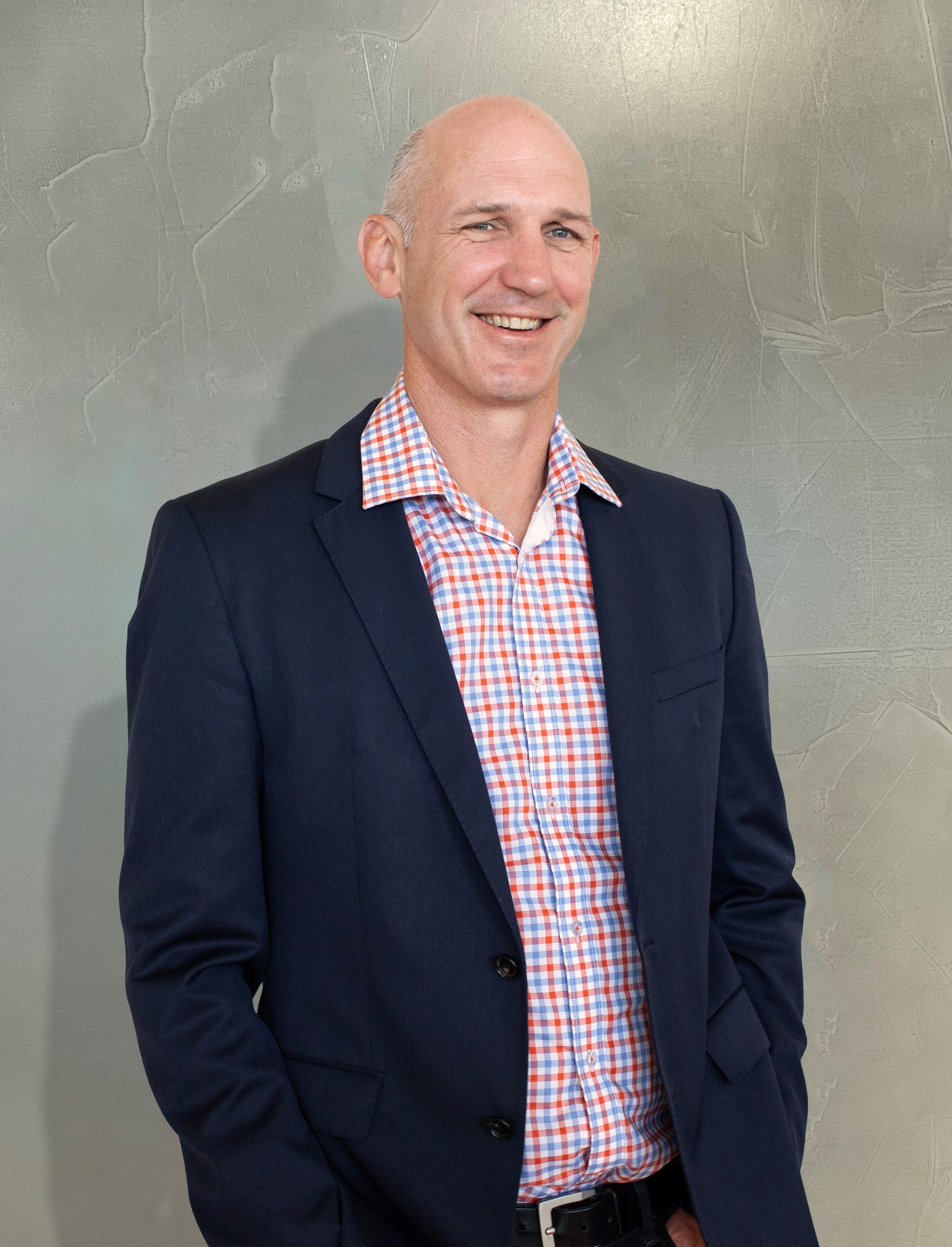
- Born: Stephen Dennis Surridge; 17 July 1970 (age 56) Auckland, New Zealand
- Height: 1.93 m (6 ft 4 in)
- Weight: 93 kg (205 lb)
- School: Saint Kentigern College
- University: University of Auckland; University of Cambridge
- Occupation: Businessman

Rugby union career
- Position: Number 8
Senior career
Years	Team	Apps	(Points)
2000–2001	Yamaha Júbilo		
Provincial / State sides
Years	Team	Apps	(Points)
1991–1992	Auckland	2	(0)
1996–1999	Canterbury	28	(10)
Super Rugby
Years	Team	Apps	(Points)
1997–1999	Crusaders	29	(5)
International career
Years	Team	Apps	(Points)
1991	New Zealand Colts	3	(8)
1992–1993	New Zealand Universities	5	(4)
1997	New Zealand	3	(5)

Stephen Dennis Surridge (born 17 July 1970) is the founder of Forbury (Commercial Real Estate Property Valuations Software) and also a former New Zealand rugby union player.

== Education ==
Surridge received his Engineering degree from the University of Auckland in 1992 and then completed a postgraduate diploma in Manufacturing Management at the University of Cambridge in the UK in 1996. From 2000 to 2003 in Sydney, he gained a postgraduate diploma in finance and investment from the Securities Institute of Australia.

== Career ==
=== Rugby career ===
A number 8, Surridge represented Auckland and Canterbury at a provincial level and the Crusaders in Super Rugby. He was a member of the New Zealand national side, the All Blacks, on the 1997 tour of Britain and Ireland, playing in three matches but no internationals. By the time he finished in top rugby, Steve had played 29 Super 12 matches for the Crusaders and 28 matches for Canterbury. He had a leading role in the NPC first division title win in 1997 and was in the Crusaders in the Super 12 championship wins of 1998 and 1999.

=== Business career ===
From 2002 to 2007, Surridge spent five years of his professional career working with Ernst & Young as a financial modeling consultant. From 2008 to 2016, Steve pursued a corporate career and became the Chief Financial Officer for the New Zealand companies Solid Energy and Tait Communications.

Surridge starting developing a customised valuation tool for major players in the commercial real estate industry in Australasia. This work highlighted a common need in commercial real estate investment tools and resulted in the development of a bespoke solution for property valuation, which led to the formation of Forbury in 2003.
