= Gareth Wyatt =

Wales international rugby union player

- Born: 4 March 1977 (age 49) Pontypridd, Wales
- Height: 5 ft 10 in (178 cm)
- Weight: 13 st 1 lb (183 lb; 83 kg)
- School: Ysgol Gyfun Llanhari, Llanhari

Rugby union career
- Position(s): Winger, fullback and fly-half
Senior career
Years	Team	Apps	(Points)
1995–2003	Pontypridd	182	
2003–2004	Celtic Warriors		
2004–2009	NG Dragons	109	(145)
2009–2010	Newport		
2010–	Pontypridd		
International career
Years	Team	Apps	(Points)
- Wales Sevens
- Wales U19
- Wales U21
- Wales A
1997–	Wales	2	(5)

Gareth Wyatt (born 4 March 1977]) is a Welsh rugby union player who won two caps for the Wales national team.

== Education ==
A fluent Welsh speaker, Wyatt attended Ysgol Gymraeg Llantrisant (Llantrisant Welsh Primary School) and later Ysgol Gyfun Llanhari Welsh comprehensive school.

== Club career ==
Wyatt started his professional career at Pontypridd RFC, winning a regional contract at the beginning of the 2003 season with the Celtic Warriors. In 2004, due to a combination of factors involving both the Welsh Rugby Union and owner Leighton Samuel, the team was disbanded and players transferred to various other regions and teams throughout Europe.

Due to his ability to play in several positions, Wing, Fullback and Fly Half, Wyatt found a contract playing for the Newport Gwent Dragons alongside other notable former Celtic Warrior teammates including Kevin Morgan, Ceri Sweeney, Michael Owen and Gareth Cooper. He left the Newport Gwent Dragons in May 2009 and joined Newport RFC. Wyatt departed Newport at the end of the 2009/2010 season and returned to Pontypridd in the Summer.

== International career ==
Wyatt attained two full Wales caps scoring one try. He also represented Wales at Sevens (three Commonwealth Games), Under 19 level, Under 21 level and Wales A.
