= Andre Bachelet =

American rugby union player (born 1970)

- Born: March 11, 1970 (age 56) Sydney, Australia
- Height: 5 ft 8 in (173 cm)
- Weight: 184 lb (83 kg)
- University: UC Berkeley

Rugby union career
- Position: Scrum-half
International career
Years	Team	Apps	(Points)
1993–98	United States	33	(59)

Andre Bachelet (born March 11, 1970) is an American former international rugby union player.

A native of Sydney, Australia, Bachelet attended University of California, Berkeley and won three collegiate titles playing with the Golden Bears. He played club rugby for Old Blues and Denver Barbarians, with a stint in England at Reading.

Bachelet played scrum-half on the United States national team from 1993 to 1998 and was a team captain.

== See also ==
- List of United States national rugby union players
