= Dan Griffiths (rugby union, born 1979) =

Welsh rugby union player

- Born: 1 February 1979 (age 47) Carmarthen, Wales
- Height: 5 ft 10 in (1.78 m)
- Weight: 13 st 1 lb (83 kg)
- School: Coedcae School

Rugby union career
- Position(s): Fly-half; Fullback
Senior career
Years	Team	Apps	(Points)
1999-2003	Whitland RFC	0	(1118)
2003	Llanelli RFC	0	(0)
2003-	Newport RFC	141	(1244)
2004-5	Newport Gwent Dragons	2	(0)
- Correct as of 2008-03-15

Daniel Phillip Griffiths (born 1 February 1979) in Carmarthen, Wales is a rugby union player for Bridgend Ravens. He previously played for Whitland RFC and Aviron Bayonnais. He then played over 150 games for Newport RFC and became the highest all time points scorer for the club in February 2008 at Maesteg. In doing so, he beat Paul Turner's record which had stood since 1992. He has also appeared twice for the Newport Gwent Dragons, coming on as a replacement against Munster and the Ospreys in 2005. In June 2010 he joined Bridgend Ravens, later taking up a coaching role, and in November 2012, he was appointed Elite Youth Performance Manager at the Ospreys.

== Newport RFC Record ==
Season	Games	Tries	Conversions	Penalties	Drop goals	Total points
2003-04	30	8	72	51	0	337
2004-05	33	5	90	33	0	304
2005-06	30	0	30	66	2	264
2006-07	20	1	22	31	0	142
2007-08	28	2	29	39	4	197
2008-09	25	2	33	45	2	217
2009-10	21	0	21	16	0	90
TOTAL	187	18	297	281	8	1551

== Bridgend Ravens Record ==
Season	Games	Tries	Conversions	Penalties	Drop goals	Total points
2010-11	22	5	63	60	0	331
2011-12	5	0	3	0	0	6
TOTAL	26	5	66	60	0	337
