= Matt Back =

Wales international rugby union player

- Full name: Mathew Back
- Born: 5 April 1970 (age 56) Pontypridd, Wales
- Height: 6 ft 0 in (183 cm)
- Weight: 203 lb (92 kg)

Rugby union career
- Position: Fullback
International career
Years	Team	Apps	(Points)
1995	Wales	4	(0)

Mathew Back (born 5 April 1970) is a Welsh former rugby union international.

Back was a fullback, born in Pontypridd, who was capped four times for Wales, all in the 1995 Five Nations Championship. He came on as a substitute in the first two matches and started as fullback for the remaining matches, with Tony Clement out with concussion. At club level, Back competed first for his hometown club Pontypridd, then played with Bridgend, Swansea, Bristol and Aberavon. He is a teacher by profession.

== See also ==
- List of Wales national rugby union players
