= Kevin Morgan (rugby union) =

Wales international rugby union player

- Born: Kevin Andrew Morgan; 23 February 1977 (age 49) Pontypridd, Wales
- Height: 1.78 m (5 ft 10 in)
- Weight: 83 kg (13 st 1 lb)
- School: Ysgol Gyfun Rhydfelen

Rugby union career
- Position(s): Full-back, Wing
Senior career
Years	Team	Apps	(Points)
1995-1999	Pontypridd	72	(200)
1999-2003	Swansea	77	(100)
2003-2004	Celtic Warriors	9	(5)
2004-2009	Dragons	75	(125)
2009-2010	Neath	18	(10)
- Correct as of 2007-04-13
International career
Years	Team	Apps	(Points)
1997-2007	Wales	48	(60)
- Correct as of 2007-04-13

Kevin Andrew Morgan (born 23 February 1977 in Pontypridd) is a Welsh former rugby union player. He won 48 caps for Wales, mainly at full back but also on the wing.

== Education ==
Morgan is a fluent Welsh speaker having attended Ysgol Gynradd Gymraeg Pontsionnorton (Pontsionnorton Welsh Primary school) and later Ysgol Gyfun Rhydfelen Welsh comprehensive school.

== Club career ==
Morgan (height 5 ft 10 in, weight 13 st 4 lb) initially played club rugby for his home town club, Pontypridd, then joined Swansea in 1998. He joined the Celtic Warriors when regional sides were formed in 2003. When the Celtic Warriors region was disbanded in 2004 he signed for the Newport Gwent Dragons, and went on to be the Celtic League's top try scorer in the 2004–05 season. Morgan was released at the end of the 2008–2009 season and joined Neath as player/coach in June 2009.

== International career ==
Morgan made his debut for Wales in a match against the US in Wilmington in 1997. His career has been affected by a series of injuries, including a broken foot and a knee ligament injury. The broken foot meant that he missed the entire 2004 Six Nations Championship. In the 2005 Six Nations he was a substitute against England and Italy, coming on as a replacement for Hal Luscombe in both matches, but then regained a starting position for the remaining matches. He scored two tries in the match against Scotland and a crucial try in the win against Ireland which clinched the Grand Slam.

== Post-playing career ==
Morgan started his professional career as a player/ fitness coach with Neath, before taking on a role with Ospreys. After 8 years at Ospreys and a short stint with Georgia Rugby Union, he currently is an Athletic Performance Coach working at Bristol Bears.
