= Mike Voyle =

Wales international rugby union footballer

- Full name: Michael John Voyle
- Born: 3 January 1970 (age 56) Caerphilly, Wales
- Height: 196 cm (6 ft 5 in)
- Weight: 107 kg (236 lb)

Rugby union career
- Position: Lock
Amateur team(s)
Years	Team	Apps	(Points)
- Penallta
- Newbridge
- Ebbw Vale
Senior career
Years	Team	Apps	(Points)
1992–1996	Newport	80	(25)
1994	Cardiff	1	(0)
1996–1999	Llanelli	81	(30)
1999–2001	Cardiff	43	(5)
2001–2003	Newport	52	(10)
International career
Years	Team	Apps	(Points)
- Wales U20
- Wales U21
1997	Wales A	1	(0)
1996–2000	Wales	22	(0)

Michael John Voyle (born 3 January 1970) is a Welsh former rugby union player who played as a lock forward. Born in Caerphilly, he played club rugby for Penallta, Newbridge, Ebbw Vale, Newport, Llanelli and Cardiff. He made his debut for Wales in 1996 and went on to earn 22 caps, including two appearances at the 1999 Rugby World Cup.

== Career ==
=== Club career ===
Born in Caerphilly, Voyle began his career with nearby Penallta. After spells with Newbridge and Ebbw Vale, he joined Division 1 side Newport for the 1992–93 season. He made 80 appearances over the next four seasons, scoring five tries, as well as a single appearance for Cardiff in a brief spell at the start of the 1994–95 season. In 1996, Voyle moved to fellow Division 1 side Llanelli. He spent three seasons with Llanelli, scoring six tries in 81 appearances, before returning to Cardiff at the end of the 1998–99 season. After another two years with Cardiff, he had planned to retire to New Zealand, but was talked into returning to Newport for another two years. In 2003, Voyle was part of the Newport team that reached the final of the Welsh Cup, where they lost 32–9 to his former club, Llanelli. His final start came in a 61–9 win at home to another former club, Ebbw Vale, on 17 May 2003, although he made a final appearance as a replacement in a high-scoring loss to Neath the following week. There was speculation that Voyle might put off his retirement again in order to make a move to Irish side Munster, but this did not come to pass.

=== International career ===
In international rugby, Voyle played for Wales at both under-20 and under-21 level, before being selected for the Wales senior team's tour of Australia in June 1996. He made his debut in the first test against the Wallabies on 8 June, coming on as a temporary replacement for Gwyn Jones before substituting Derwyn Jones. Ten days later, he scored a try in the uncapped tour match against Victoria, which finished in a 42–9 win. He was left out of the squad for the second test, but was recalled for a match against France in September 1996. He then missed the first three matches of the 1997 Five Nations Championship, returning for the 34–13 loss to England in the final match. In May 1997, Voyle was picked to play for Wales A in a game against Romania A in Bucharest; he played the full match as Wales won 42–33.

That summer, Voyle was picked for Wales' tour of North America, where he played in both tests against the United States and the final match against Canada. By the end of 1997, Voyle had become one of Wales' first-choice locks, starting the autumn matches against Tonga and New Zealand, as well as the entire 1998 Five Nations campaign and the pre-Five Nations match against Italy; however, he was left out of the 1998 summer tour of southern Africa. He came back for the win over Argentina in the autumn and the losses to Scotland and Ireland in the 1999 Five Nations, but only as a replacement.

After not playing in either test on the tour to Argentina in June 1999, he did come off the bench later that month in the opening game at Cardiff's Millennium Stadium, a first ever win for Wales over South Africa. A few days later, he was named in Wales' squad for the 1999 Rugby World Cup, to be played on home turf. He made another substitute appearance in the World Cup warm-up match against France, and was named on the bench for the tournament opener against Argentina, but did not come on. He started in Wales' second game of the tournament, a 64–15 win over Japan, but was left out of the final pool match against Samoa. He returned to the bench for the quarter-final against Australia and came on for the last 10 minutes of the 24–9 defeat. He made one more appearance for Wales in the opening game of the newly expanded Six Nations, which finished in a 36–3 loss to France. Voyle finished with a total of 22 caps for Wales, although he never appeared on the scoresheet. He was named in the Wales A squad for games against Argentina and France during the 2001–02 season, but was ultimately not picked against Argentina and missed the France game due to injury.

== Personal life ==
In 2001, Voyle was found guilty of driving without due care and attention, and obstructing a police investigation after a road accident in Cardiff the previous November that left a student with two leg fractures and internal injuries. He was fined £1,250 plus costs and banned from driving for six months. He had previously pleaded guilty to failing to stop at the scene, failing to report the accident and driving without insurance.

After his retirement in 2003, Voyle moved to New Zealand and became an estate agent.
