= Ian Buckett =

Welsh rugby union player (1967–2024)

Ian Martin Buckett
- Born: 23 December 1967 Holywell, Flintshire, Wales
- Died: 9 July 2024 (aged 56)
- School: Holywell High School, Wales
- University: University College, Oxford

Rugby union career
- Position: Prop
Amateur team(s)
Years	Team	Apps	(Points)
- Birkenhead Park FC
–	North Wales R.U.		
–	Swansea RFC		
–	Barbarian F.C.		
–	Oxford University RFC		
–	London Welsh RFC		
Senior career
Years	Team	Apps	(Points)
1988–1998	Swansea RFC	186	(12)
1998–2001	London Welsh RFC	87	
International career
Years	Team	Apps	(Points)
	Wales Under-21	1	
	Wales A	9	(4)
1994–1997	Wales	3	(0)

Ian Martin Buckett (23 December 1967 – 9 July 2024) was a Welsh international rugby union front row forward, who played for Swansea and London Welsh. He also played county rugby for North Wales. He was a championship winning player, an international and an academic.

Buckett was a member of the 1992 Oxford University team and attained three full caps for Wales.

He was selected for more televised rugby football games from 1992 to 1995 than any other UK player.

== Early international career ==
Having scored in his Wales Students debut against England in the inaugural Student World Cup in Biarritz, Southern France in 1988 he would go on to earn selection for the Wales under-21 team both for a warm up game in Aldershot and internationally against Scotland. He had made his reputation after some bustling performances for North Wales representative sides including against New Zealand under-21. He was twenty one years old when he first lined up against the All Blacks in 1989.

In 1992 he skippered Wales Students to a junior World Cup competition in Italy where they were knocked out of the tournament by New Zealand Universities losing 12–13 in Sicily. By the time he was twenty five years old, and as a yet uncapped senior player, Ian Buckett had spent 6 months touring Southern and South Africa successfully within a number of international level teams, playing in one loss.

== International career ==
Buckett was first capped for Wales against Tonga in Nukuʻalofa in 1994 which was the third of a four test tour and the second and decisive test on the Islands.

Buckett had toured several times with the senior side. He had made his first try scoring appearance for a Wales XV in Swakopmund in Namibia in 1990, his second at altitude in Bulawayo, Zimbabwe in 1993 and his last appearance against Ontario in 1997.

He won further caps against the US Eagles in San Francisco in the second and decisive game in the United States of America and against Canada in a one-off test near Toronto completing a hat-trick of test wins in North America. It was generally considered that Welsh rugby was in 'disarray' at the time shortly after the arrival of the professional game and he was a late inclusion to both the tour party and the team due to squad injuries. He had already played in the end of season victory over Romania in Bucharest.

Ian Buckett usually featured in the Wales A team playing in nine games between 1993 and 1998, his final game after making the Autumn Test Series following the end of season North American tour against the touring All Blacks at Sardis Road, Pontypridd. He left the field after 47 minutes, ending a cycle of nine games for the Welsh Rugby Union in six months losing one, and a ten-year representative career.

He also played twice for Wales B against the Netherlands starting over forty representations for Wales at all levels scoring three tries, and a match day squad for a Final Challenge game for the Barbarians against Argentina in Cardiff covering loose head and tight head prop. He was then selected to play in the prestige game within Leicester Tigers.

== Injury ==
In January 1995, whilst a member of the 1995 RWC squad (41-man) he suffered a complete bilateral tear of his left hamstring in a Premier Division game between Cardiff and Swansea in the Arms Park.

== Early life ==
Ian Buckett was a Wales Schools intermediate and senior group rugby international. At the time he also played club rugby for Flint R.F.C. He moved from there to Birkenhead Park F.C., playing both as a colt and as a senior player. He showed promise as a field athlete, winning the Young Athletes in Blackpool as a teenager in the Discus Event throwing 37.47m. He made national and international level in three different sports as a schoolboy and also later participated successfully in a Guinness World Record endurance event for charity. He was a reservist for the Royal Navy for eighteen months from the age of eighteen and spent some time training in Devon, South West England.

He studied English Literature and Ancient History and Civilisation at Swansea University graduating in 1992 and played three years for the university. He was a student when selected for the Barbarian Football Club during their Centenary Season. He took up a Stanley's Scholarship to Oxford University in 1992 and matriculated in University College, Oxford.

== Club career ==
He had made his first appearance for Swansea RFC on 15 October 1988 against Leicester Tigers and made 184 appearances for the club over the next 10 years. He scored the quickest recorded try by a substitute in the Heineken Cup in a game with Wasps Football Club in September 1997. His final game, also that season, would help the Club win their third Welsh Premier Division Title of the 1990s. Including time spent at London Welsh he played over 200 competitive, national level league and cup games in England and Wales, usually starting. He turned down offers to play in both France and in Italy.

On 2 January 2000, in an English Cup fixture with Exeter he became the only full Welsh rugby international to represent London Welsh Rugby Football Club either side of the Millennium during the 1999–2000 season.

== Club representative appearances ==
During his time at Swansea, in addition to representation for the Welsh Rugby Union, the club made several appearances in international and representative matches before the advent of Welsh Regional Rugby, Ian Buckett was selected to start in the following matches:

Date	Nationality / Opponent	Ground	Result	Competition
21 October 1989	New Zealand	Saint Helens Cricket and Football Ground, Swansea	22-37	New Zealand Tour of Great Britain and Ireland 1989
5 November 1994	South Africa	Saint Helens Cricket and Football Ground, Swansea	7-78	South Africa Tour of Europe 1994
10 January 1998	Rosario	Saint Helens Cricket and Football Ground, Swansea	51-31	Welsh Rugby Union Challenge Trophy
14 January 1998	Northern Bulls	Saint Helens Cricket and Football Ground, Swansea	34-34	Welsh Rugby Union Challenge Trophy
18 January 1998	Canada XV	Saint Helens Cricket and Football Ground, Swansea	38-29	Welsh Rugby Union Challenge Trophy

== Post-rugby ==
Ian was called to the Bar of England and Wales at Gray's Inn in 2000. After failing to attain a full pupillage award in London he qualified as a solicitor at BPP College of Law, London. He practised law there and was admitted to the City of London Solicitors' Company, and later Leeds. He was chairman of Flint Rugby Football Club in north Wales, where he first began playing rugby union, from 2009 to 2013 after initially joining the management committee in December 2008 as a consultant.

During this period he is listed as holding two directorships with Rygbi Gogledd Cymru CCIC (translated North Wales Rugby), a management company for a development rugby team based in Colwyn Bay which became RGC 1404, for whom he was also a solicitor, and Deeview Consulting. Both companies were prominent in many changes to the sporting landscape in north Wales.

After the near collapse of rugby league venture Crusaders Rugby League in north Wales he, as a Director of Deeview Consulting, and a local businessman were in discussions with the Rugby Football League about a potential RFL franchise to be played out of Colwyn Bay at Championship One level in conjunction with rugby union. The Crusaders were restructured and the venture never took off.

He continued to play locally for a time as an amateur, and also in high-profile testimonial and charitable games.

== Personal life and death ==
Buckett had one son, who was born in Swansea and who played three seasons of registered rugby football. Buckett died on 9 July 2024, at the age of 56.
