= Nathan Thomas (rugby union) =

Wales international rugby union footballer

- Born: Nathan Thomas; 22 January 1976 (age 50) Bridgend, Wales
- Height: 190 cm (6 ft 3 in)
- Weight: 112 kg (17 st 9 lb)

Rugby union career
- Position: Number 8/Flanker
Senior career
Years	Team	Apps	(Points)
1994-96	Bridgend	23	(20)
1996-03	Bath		
2003	Cardiff	1	(0)
2005-06	Leeds Tykes		
2007	Llanelli	1	(5)
2008-09	Llandovery	6	(0)
Provincial / State sides
Years	Team	Apps	(Points)
2003-05	Cardiff Blues	50	(5)
2006-09	Scarlets	50	(15)
International career
Years	Team	Apps	(Points)
1996-98	Wales	9	(0)

Nathan Thomas (born 22 January 1976 in Bridgend, Wales) is a Welsh former international rugby union footballer who played in the back row.

Thomas has played for various clubs during his career, including Bridgend, Bath, Cardiff Blues, Leeds Tykes, the Scarlets and Neath. He started for Bath in the victorious 1998 Heineken Cup Final as they defeated Brive. He played 9 times for Wales between 1996 and 1998, his last being against South Africa.

In November 2009 he joined Gloucester on a short-term loan deal, but he did not make an appearance for them and now plays for their feeder club, Hartpury College. He is a lecturer at the college.
