= Chris Anthony (rugby union) =

Wales international rugby union footballer

- Born: Christopher Thomas Anthony; 23 July 1976 (age 50) Neath, Wales
- Height: 183 cm (6 ft 0 in)
- Weight: 114 kg (17 st 13 lb)
- Occupation: After his rugby career ended Christopher went on to be a primary school teacher

Rugby union career
- Position: Prop
Amateur team(s)
Years	Team	Apps	(Points)
- Swansea RFC
2001	Newport RFC		
- Ebbw Vale RFC
2003–2006	Newport GD	43	(10)
–	Barbarian F.C.		
International career
Years	Team	Apps	(Points)
1997–2003	Wales	17	(5)

Christopher Thomas Anthony (born 23 July 1976) is a former international Wales rugby union player. A prop, he played his club rugby for Newport Gwent Dragons.

Anthony played club rugby for several amateur teams including Newport and Swansea. His first international cap was against United States national rugby union team at Wilmington in 1997.
