= Lyndon Mustoe =

- Born: Lyndon Mustoe; 30 January 1969 (age 57) Caerleon, Wales
- Height: 1.83 m (6 ft 0 in)
- Weight: 113 kg (17 st 11 lb)
- School: Chepstow Comprehensive

Rugby union career
- Position: Prop
Amateur team(s)
Years	Team	Apps	(Points)
- Chepstow RFC
–	Newport RFC		
–	Pontypool RFC		
–	Cardiff RFC		
–	Bridgend RFC		
International career
Years	Team	Apps	(Points)
1995–1998	Wales	10	(0)

Lyndon Mustoe (born 30 January 1969) was a Welsh rugby union prop who was selected for the Wales national team on ten occasions during the 1990s.

Mustoe represented several Welsh club sides throughout his playing career, including Chepstow, Newport, Pontypool, Cardiff and Bridgend. In 1996 he was part of the Cardiff team that lost against Toulouse in the first Heineken Cup final.
