= Rob Appleyard =

Wales international rugby union footballer

- Born: Robert Charles A. Appleyard; 9 December 1972 (age 53) Haverfordwest, Wales
- Height: 6.20 ft (1.89 m)
- Weight: 16.1 st (102 kg)
- School: Pembroke Comprehensive
- University: Neath Tertiary College

Rugby union career
- Position: Flanker
- Current team: retired
Youth career
- -: Pembroke RFC
Senior career
Years	Team	Apps	(Points)
	Swansea RFC	139	(90)
- Sale Sharks
2004	Cardiff RFC		
–	Barbarian F.C.		
- Correct as of 25 June 2014
International career
Years	Team	Apps	(Points)
1997–1998	Wales	9	(0)

Robert Charles Appleyard (born 9 December 1972) is a former Wales international rugby union player. A flanker, he played club rugby for Swansea RFC Sale Sharks and Cardiff RFC. He was assistant coach to the Wales national under-20 rugby union team for the 2008 and 2010 Junior Rugby World Cup. He is currently a director/agent at Win sports management.

In June 2011 he was appointed full-time defence coach to Newport Gwent Dragons He started his coaching career as defence coach at the Ospreys before moving west as a skills coach at the Scarlets.
