= Andy Moore (rugby union, born 1968) =

Welsh rugby union player

Andy Moore (born 6 September 1968) is a former Wales international rugby union player. A scrum-half, he played for Wales in the 1995 Rugby World Cup finals and at the time played club rugby for Cardiff RFC. Clubs represented: Cardiff RFC, University of Oxford, Richmond RFC, Benetton Treviso, Neath RFC, Cardiff Blues
