= Andrew Lewis (rugby union) =

Welsh rugby union player

- Born: Andrew Leighton Paul Lewis; 13 June 1973 (age 53) Swansea, Wales
- Height: 5 ft 10 in (1.78 m)
- Weight: 107 kg (16 st 12 lb)

Rugby union career
- Position: Prop/Hooker
Senior career
Years	Team	Apps	(Points)
1992-2004	Cardiff RFC	234	(70)
2003-2005	Cardiff Blues	26	(5)
International career
Years	Team	Apps	(Points)
1996-2002	Wales	29	(0)

Andrew Leighton Paul Lewis (born 13 June 1973) is a former Welsh international rugby union player who went to school at Christ College, Brecon. Lewis made 29 appearances for the national team, and spent his entire club playing career at Cardiff, firstly at Cardiff RFC and then at Cardiff Blues following the introduction of regional rugby in Wales.

Lewis joined the Cardiff RFC team in 1992. He was first called up to the Wales national team in August 1995 as part of the squad for Wales' tour of South Africa. His debut for Wales came in 1996 against Italy. He played his initial games for Wales as prop, but at the instigation of Wales coach Graham Henry, switched to the position of hooker. He was included in Wales' squad for the 1999 Rugby World Cup, and played in three matches as a replacement. His final appearance for Wales was as a replacement against Romania in November 2002.

He played for Cardiff in the 1996 Heineken Cup Final loss to Toulouse, and was a member of the squad that won the 1999–2000 Welsh-Scottish League title.

Despite plans to retire from rugby at the end of the 2004-05 season, Lewis finished his playing career in early 2005 after taking medical advice.

Outside of rugby, Lewis joined wealth management firm Brewin Dolphin in 2003. In July 2017 Lewis joined Investment Management Firm Brooks Macdonald, following the opening of their first Office in Wales.
