= Steve Moore (rugby union) =

Wales international rugby union footballer

- Born: Stephen John Moore; 20 July 1972 (age 54) Grantham, Lincolnshire, England
- Height: 6 ft 5 in (1.96 m)
- Weight: 17 st 10 lb (112 kg)
- Notable relative: Andy Moore (brother)

Rugby union career
- Position: Second row
Senior career
Years	Team	Apps	(Points)
1991-1997	Swansea RFC	98	(77)
1997-1998	Moseley RFC	7	(5)
1998-2001	Cardiff RFC	50	(30)
International career
Years	Team	Apps	(Points)
1997	Wales	3	(0)

Stephen John Moore (born 20 July 1972) is a former Wales international rugby union player. Born in Grantham in Lincolnshire, England, Moore moved to Wrexham in Wales aged seven.

Following appearances for Wrexham RFC, Moore's first-class rugby career began when he was signed to play for Swansea RFC in 1991. Moore played for the club for six seasons, including their Heineken League championship winning seasons in 1991-92 and 1993–94 and their SWALEC Cup win in the 1994–95 season. His try for Swansea in their defeat against Cardiff in the 1996-97 SWALEC Cup final was the last first-class try to be scored at the National Stadium in Cardiff before its closure and demolition.

Moore played his final game for Swansea in May 1997. He was included in the Wales national team for their tour of North America and made his début for Wales against Canada in July 1997. For the 1997–98 season, Moore moved to the Moseley RFC club. He played his first game at home for Wales against Romania which, due to the closure of the National Stadium in Cardiff, took place at the Racecourse Ground in Wrexham, the town where Moore grew up. His final appearance for the Wales national team came in the match against Tonga in November 1997. He left Mosley after one season to join Cardiff RFC for the 1998–99 season. He remained at Cardiff for three seasons, before leaving to join French club Narbonne on a two-year contract. He also made one appearance for the Barbarians invitational team against East Midlands in 2001.

Following his retirement from playing, Moore set up a company with his brother, Athlete Career Transition Pathway (ACT), to assist with preparing professional sports people with a career following their retirement from sport.

== Personal life ==
Since 2021, Moore has been married to the former Wales netball international, Sara Hale.
