= Celtic Warriors =

Defunct Welsh rugby union club, based first in Bridgend then Pontypridd

- Founded: 2003
- Disbanded: 2004; 22 years ago
- Location: Bridgend, Wales; Pontypridd, Wales
- Ground: Brewery Field (Note: The team also played their home games at Sardis Road, with capacity for 7,861.) (Capacity: 12,000)
- Chairman: Leighton Samuel
- Coach: (Wales) Lynn Howells
- Captain(s): (Wales) Gareth Thomas (England) Richard Bryan
Team kit

The Celtic Warriors (Welsh: Y Rhyfelwyr Celtaidd) were a rugby union team from Wales, who played in the 2003–04 Celtic League and the 2003–04 Heineken Cup following the introduction of regional rugby union teams in Wales. They were effectively a temporary merger of Pontypridd RFC and Bridgend RFC. The Celtic Warriors played just one season before disbanding. The team was poorly supported, with Pontypridd RFC supporters reluctant to watch the Celtic Warriors play in Bridgend and trying to prevent any aspect of Bridgend RFC's identity seeping into the new entity. The animosity and insistence that Pontypridd RFC be the focal point for the team despite almost all financial support coming from Bridgend led to its downfall and the demise of pro rugby in Rhondda Cynon Taf, something Pontypridd RFC was trying to protect.

== History ==
The Celtic Warriors were one of the five original Welsh regional rugby sides. They were established in the summer of 2003 when the Welsh Rugby Union (WRU) controversially elected to reduce the top tier of professional rugby in the country from nine clubs to five regions, attempting to mirror the successful formats of rugby union in Ireland, South Africa, Australia and New Zealand. Officially representing the Mid Glamorgan area, including Merthyr Tydfil, Aberdare, Pontypridd, Caerphilly, Maesteg and Bridgend, as well as south Powys, in practice the Celtic Warriors were a combination of two Welsh Premier Division clubs: Pontypridd RFC and Bridgend RFC. With Bridgend RFC having clinched the 2002–03 Welsh Premier League title and Pontypridd RFC performing consistently well in domestic rugby, the Warriors were considered one of the strongest line-ups of the five Welsh regions.

However, problems dogged the region from the very start, as they similarly did with the other merged regions of the Neath–Swansea Ospreys and the Newport Gwent Dragons. Discussions and arguments abounded about the team name, colours and home grounds for most of the summer of 2003. The team originally adopted the name "RCT Ravens", reflecting the region's primary location in the county of Rhondda Cynon Taf (RCT) and Bridgend RFC's nickname, the Ravens; however, this name was rejected because Bridgend is not in Rhondda Cynon Taf and Pontypridd supporters objected to the inclusion of Bridgend's nickname. That name was dropped in June 2003, and other names, including "Crusaders", "Glamorgan Gladiators" and "Glamorgan Celts", were also rejected, before settling on the Celtic Warriors name in July 2003. In response to the branding issues, as well as the structure of the region's board, Bridgend RFC owner Leighton Samuel resigned as chairman of the Warriors board.

Celtic Warriors badge - 2004–05 season (unplayed)

Originally, the team decided to play an equal number of games at Bridgend's Brewery Field and Pontypridd's Sardis Road, ahead of plans to build a new stadium for the Warriors in either Treforest or Llantrisant, financed by the sale of Brewery Field. However, Pontypridd RFC went into administration in October 2003 with debts of £670,000, leading to the sale of their half of the Warriors to Samuel, which he in turn gave to the WRU. In November 2003, they also made the decision to play all future Warriors games at Brewery Field, due in part to the extra revenue brought in by the 16 hospitality boxes at the Bridgend ground, though they did play one more game at Sardis Road at the start of April 2004.

Financial difficulties at the Warriors led to talks of a merger with the Cardiff Blues, but these were quashed in January 2004. In March 2004, Samuel announced that he would be withdrawing his financial backing for Bridgend RFC to focus entirely on the Warriors. Two months later, it emerged that Samuel had agreed to sell his remaining 50% share of the Warriors to the WRU; however, on 19 May 2004, Samuel claimed that he had withdrawn the offer to sell the region, after the WRU missed his deadline of 14:00 to complete the purchase. The WRU counter-claimed that no deadline had been set and that the funds had been transferred to Samuel by 14:45 that day, making them 100% shareholders of the Warriors. Samuel ultimately accepted that the WRU had bought his share of the team, but that he would be challenging the sale on the basis that the WRU had misrepresented their intention to keep the Warriors going. Despite claims that the team would continue for at least another season, it was expected that the union would dissolve the Warriors, following a review by WRU chief executive David Moffett, leaving just four regional sides in Wales. The Warriors' players were then divided among the four remaining teams, and the club was put into liquidation on 1 June 2004.

Samuel first brought his legal challenge against the WRU in October 2004, also claiming that he was owed £1.75 million from the sale and in repayment of a "significant financial contribution" made by his company Décor Frame Ltd, and proceedings began in the High Court in April 2005. That June, Samuel was accused of making a death threat against a WRU lawyer, but no case was ever brought. In July 2005, the WRU wrote to Bridgend RFC, threatening to sue for over £200,000 owed by the club if they lost the Warriors case; however, the case was ultimately settled in October 2006 without having to go to court.

== Aftermath ==
With the demise of the club, players' contracts were effectively torn up as they were pushed around to fill positions in the other four regional sides. A number simply chose to turn their back on the Welsh game and moved to teams in England and France. This left the ex-Warriors' fans feeling alienated from the professional game.

Bridgend RFC fans eventually warmed to the Ospreys, the pro team that took over the development pathway that included Bridgend RFC. In the 2025–26 United Rugby Championship season, the Ospreys played their home games at the Brewery Field while St Helens Rugby and Cricket Ground in Swansea is redeveloped. Most Pontypridd RFC supporters have refused to engage with Cardiff Rugby, the team that oversees that development pathway in which Pontypridd is located, due to a feeling that the clubs should be equals.

Bridgend RFC currently play in the semi-professional Super Rygbi Cymru, the second highest level of rugby in Wales. Pontypridd RFC play one level lower in the Welsh Premier Division, but hope to move up a level to join the SRC in the future.

In the aftermath of the demise of the Warriors, a new rugby league club Celtic Crusaders was formed and played at Brewery Field. They were funded by Leighton Samuel, who claimed that they were the reincarnation of the Warriors franchise. The club lasted four seasons in Bridgend before relocating to Wrexham under new ownership.

== Home ground ==
The Warriors used both Brewery Field and Sardis Road for their home games.

== Statistics ==
=== Celtic League ===
Season	Pos	Played	Won	Drawn	Lost	Bonus	Points
2003–04	4th	22	14	0	8	9	65

=== Celtic Cup ===
Season	Opponent	Round	Score
2003–04	Glasgow	1st	19–9

=== Heineken Cup ===
Season	Pool/Round	Pos.	Played	Won	Drawn	Lost	Bonus	Points
2003–04	Pool 6	2nd	6	4	0	2	4	20

=== British & Irish Lions ===
- Gareth Thomas: 2005 (captain for 2nd and 3rd tests)
- Brent Cockbain: 2005
- Gareth Cooper: 2005
- Ryan Jones: 2005, 2009
- Gethin Jenkins: 2005, 2009, 2013
- Matthew Rees: 2009
- Ian Evans: 2013 (held a development contract at Celtic Warriors)

== See also ==
- Pro14
- Crusaders Rugby League
- Celtic League
- Heineken Cup
- European Rugby Shield
