= Paul John (rugby union) =

Wales international rugby union player

Medal record

Asian Games
Gold medal – first place	2018 Jakarta	Team

Paul John (born 25 January 1970 in Pontypridd) is a Welsh rugby union coach and former player. He won 10 caps for Wales. He is the son of Dennis John, former Wales head coach.

== Playing career ==
A scrum-half, he played his club rugby for Cardiff RFC, and then Pontypridd RFC, where he was captain. John played for Llantwit Fardre Cardiff from 1986 until 1991. He won 10 Welsh caps, making his debut against Tonga in 1994. He retired as a player in 2005.

== Coaching career ==
He was, until 2010, head coach at Pontypridd. He was assistant coach of the club, as well as a successful head coach of the Wales Sevens team, who won the 2009 Rugby World Cup Sevens. John was appointed backs coach for Cardiff Blues in January 2014.

Paul was a teacher of physical education (PE) at Bryn Celynnog Comprehensive School in Beddau, and Coedylan Comprehensive School in Cilfynydd before becoming a full-time coach within the Wales Rugby Union National Academy.

He is now coaching the Hong Kong Sevens Team. In the 2018 Asian Games, Hong Kong won all their games in the competition including an upset victory over Japan by 14–0. Hong Kong became the first gold medal winners in the Asian Games Rugby Sevens under his guidance.
