= Dafydd James =

British Lions & Wales international rugby union player (born 1975)

- Born: Dafydd Rhys James; 24 July 1975 (age 51) Mufulira, Zambia
- Height: 1.94 m (6 ft 4 1/2 in)
- Weight: 99 kg (15 st 8 lb; 218 lb)
- School: Brynteg Comprehensive School
- University: Swansea University

Rugby union career
- Position(s): Wing, Centre
Senior career
Years	Team	Apps	(Points)
1995–1997	Bridgend	43	(80)
1997–1999	Pontypridd	54	(115)
1999–2001	Llanelli	52	(145)
2001–2003	Bridgend	33	(80)
2003-2004	Celtic Warriors	18	(10)
2004–2005	Harlequins	22	(15)
2005-2009	Scarlets	72	(115)
2009	Bridgend	1	(5)
2009-2010	Cardiff Blues	4	(0)
2010	Sale	7	(0)
2010–2011	HKCC		
International career
Years	Team	Apps	(Points)
1996	Wales U21	1	(0)
1997	Wales A	1	(0)
1995–2007	Wales	48	(75)
2001	British & Irish Lions	3	(5)

Dafydd Rhys James (born 24 July 1975) is a Welsh former rugby union footballer who played on the wing or in the centre. He toured with the British & Irish Lions in 2001. James was born in Mufulira, Zambia, but earned 48 caps for Wales and three for the British & Irish Lions. At club level, he played for Bridgend, Pontypridd, Llanelli, Celtic Warriors, Harlequins, Scarlets, Cardiff Blues and Sale Sharks.

== Domestic career ==
James began his professional rugby career at Bridgend RFC in 1995 after coming up through the ranks of Kenfig Hill RFC. After 43 appearances for Bridgend, he moved to Pontypridd RFC in 1997, where he played his part in the infamous Battle of Brive (Heineken cup clash 1997) and went on to make 54 club appearances in two years. In 1999 James moved to West Wales to play his rugby and enjoyed his first stint at Llanelli playing 52 games and scoring 145 points. He returned to Bridgend in 2001 (which later became the Celtic Warriors regional side in 2003). 2004 saw James move to London to play for Harlequins, before being tempted back to Wales only a year later to return for the Llanelli Scarlets where he stayed until 2009.

James scored over 565 points in his career and was the first to score over 25 tries in Heineken Cup and scored 29 tries overall.

== International career ==
James made his international debut for Wales in 1996, playing against Australia in Sydney. He went on to win 48 caps in 11 years and scored 15 tries. His last cap came at the 2007 Rugby World Cup.

In 2001, James played all three Tests for the British & Irish Lions in Australia, scoring one of their four tries in the opening Test victory.
