= Leigh Davies =

Wales international rugby union player

- Born: Leigh Barry Davies; 20 February 1976 (age 50) Neath, Neath Port Talbot, Wales
- Height: 6 ft 0 in (1.83 m)
- Weight: 15st 7 lb (99 kg)

Rugby union career
- Position: Centre
Amateur team(s)
Years	Team	Apps	(Points)
- Neath RFC
- Cardiff RFC
- Bristol RFC
2000–03	Llanelli RFC		
2003–05	Llanelli Scarlets		
2005–06	Ospreys		
International career
Years	Team	Apps	(Points)
1996–2003	Wales	21	(20)

Leigh Davies is a former international Wales rugby union player. A centre, he was known for his strength and direct running. He played rugby for various clubs including stints at Neath RFC, Cardiff RFC, Bristol RFC, Llanelli RFC. In 2003 he was the first captain of the Llanelli Scarlets region. He left the Scarlets during the 2004–05 season to travel the world. In 2005 he was signed by the Scarlets' rivals the Ospreys who were in their first season at the Liberty Stadium. Davies released the following Season.
