= Kevin Bowring =

Wales international rugby union footballer (1954–2024)

- Born: Kevin Bowring; 9 May 1954 Neath, Wales
- Died: 10 October 2024 (aged 70)

Rugby union career
- Position: Coach
Coaching career
- Years: Team
- Wales Under-20
- Wales Under-21
- Wales A
- 1995–1998: Wales
- 1999–?: Newbury RFC
- Correct as of 19:09, 9 January 2013 (UTC)

Kevin Bowring (9 May 1954 – 10 October 2024) was a Welsh rugby union player and coach. Bowring attended Neath Grammar School for Boys. A flanker, he played for London Welsh and captained the team. He also represented the Barbarians and Middlesex County.

== Biography ==
Bowring was born in Neath, Wales on 9 May 1954.

He progressed into coaching with Wales Under-20, Under-21 and Wales A before being appointed the first full-time professional coach of the Wales national rugby union team. He was later employed by the Rugby Football Union as an Elite Coach for the England rugby union team.

Bowring was a board member of UK Coaching (former Sports Coach UK) and a member of the Coaching Committee which sets the overall strategy for sports coaching in the UK.

Bowring died of a heart attack in October 2024, at the age of 70.
