= Gareth Thomas (rugby, born 1974) =

Welsh rugby player

Gareth Thomas CBE
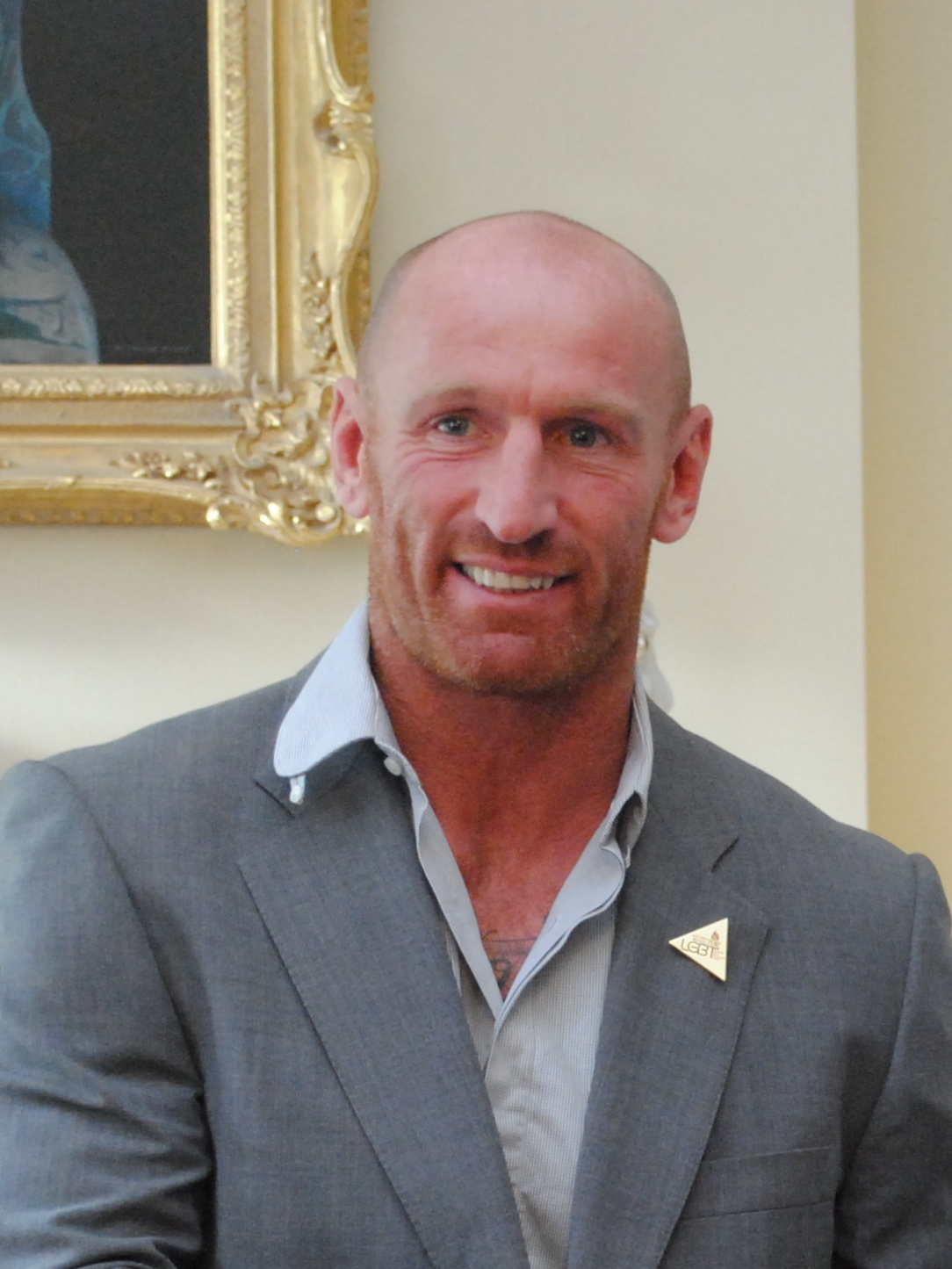
- Thomas in 2011
- Born: 25 July 1974 (age 52) Sarn, Mid Glamorgan, Wales (now Sarn, Bridgend County Borough)
- Height: 6 ft 3 in (1.91 m)
- Weight: 16 st 3 lb (227 lb; 103 kg)

Rugby union career
- Position: Fullback, Wing, Centre
Amateur team(s)
Years	Team	Apps	(Points)
- Pencoed
Senior career
Years	Team	Apps	(Points)
1994–1997	Bridgend	69	(175)
1997–2001	Cardiff RFC	76	(220)
2001–2003	Bridgend	43	(90)
2003–2004	Celtic Warriors	12	(30)
2004–2007	Toulouse	61	(100)
2007–2010	Cardiff Blues	60	(60)
- Correct as of 6 February 2010
International career
Years	Team	Apps	(Points)
–	Wales Youth		
–	Wales U21		
–	Wales A		
1995–2007	Wales	100	(200)
2005	British & Irish Lions	3	(5)
- Correct as of 1 June 2008
National sevens team
Years	Team		Comps
- Wales
- Rugby league career

Playing information
- Position: Wing, Centre, Second-row
Club
Years	Team	Pld	T	G	FG	P
2010–11	Crusaders RL	31				28
Representative
Years	Team	Pld	T	G	FG	P
2010	Wales	4				12

Gareth Thomas CBE (born 25 July 1974) is a Welsh former professional rugby union and rugby league player, who represented Wales in both codes. Nicknamed "Alfie", he was the first Wales rugby union player to play in 100 test matches, and is currently the sixth-most capped Wales player. He is 15th among international try scorers, and is the third-highest Wales try scorer. He also won four rugby league caps for Wales, scoring three tries.

He played rugby union as a fullback, wing or centre for Bridgend, Cardiff, the Celtic Warriors, Toulouse, Cardiff Blues, and Wales. In 2010 he changed codes to rugby league when he transferred from Cardiff Blues to the Crusaders in Super League, and later played for Wales. He retired from rugby in October 2011.

Thomas came out as gay in December 2009. The following year he was voted the most influential gay person in the UK in The Independent on Sunday Pink List and received Stonewall's Hero of the Year award.

== Rugby union ==
=== Club career ===
Thomas started his career at Pencoed RFC at youth level before starting his first class career at Bridgend. He then transferred to Pontypridd, but never actually played a game for them before re-signing for Bridgend. He then spent a spell at Cardiff starting in 1997 before rejoining hometown club Bridgend again in 2001 and captaining them to a Welsh Premier Division title in 2003, in a campaign where they were unbeaten at home and only lost to runners-up Neath and Cardiff away. He then joined the Celtic Warriors once the Welsh Rugby Union implemented its regional rugby plans for the 2003–04 season. After one season as captain of the Warriors, the region was disbanded by the then-WRU chief David Moffett, and owner Leighton Samuel, although Thomas had already agreed a deal to join French club Toulouse where he was seen as the ideal replacement for soon-to-retire captain Émile Ntamack. He helped the club to a Heineken Cup victory in 2005 after a victory over Stade Français at Murrayfield. On 20 January 2007, Cardiff Blues completed a deal to bring Thomas back to Wales for the 2007–08 season.

=== International career ===
Gareth Thomas made his début for Wales on 27 May 1995 against Japan. He scored a Welsh record-equalling four tries in the match against Italy in Treviso in 1999; one of only seven players to achieve that feat for Wales. He held the Wales record for the most international tries with 40 until Shane Williams surpassed that total in the 2008 Six Nations Championship He surpassed the try record previously held by Ieuan Evans in 2004 against Italy. He also got a hat-trick of tries in the Second Test against Japan in 2001; 51 appearances after announcing his arrival on the international scene with a hat-trick in the 1995 World Cup game against the same opposition. Equally at home at centre, it was from that position he scored the longest interception try ever seen at the Arms Park, a 90-metre dash against Australia in 1996.

Thomas was selected for the 2005 British & Irish Lions tour to New Zealand. Following injury to Brian O'Driscoll in the opening minutes of the first test against New Zealand, he was made captain for the second and third tests of the series, becoming the ninth Welsh captain in Lions' history.

In 2005 Thomas was found guilty of assault while playing rugby in France and in 2007 was banned for four weeks for misconduct charges.

Thomas was named as captain for Wales' final match in the 2007 Six Nations against England after current captain Stephen Jones was ruled out with a broken wrist. When Thomas took the field, he equalled Gareth Llewellyn's Wales record of 92 caps. He broke Llewellyn's record when he led Wales out against Australia at Telstra Stadium in Sydney on 26 May 2007, a match that Wales lost 29–23 on a Wallabies try after the siren.

His 100th and last test match was in his team's defeat by Fiji in the 2007 World Cup.

== Rugby league ==
Thomas joined Crusaders in March 2010 on an 18-month deal. He made his Crusaders' (and rugby league) début against French side Catalans Dragons on 19 March 2010. Thomas was concussed seconds into his rugby league début after a heavy challenge from Catalans player David Ferriol, and as a result had to leave the field after thirty minutes. Crusaders went on to win the game 14–6. Thomas went on to score his first try for the Crusaders against Wakefield Trinity in a 20–10 away victory on 11 April. A groin injury prematurely ended Thomas' first season in rugby league, but his recovery was hoped to be complete in time for the 2010 European Cup, for which Thomas was selected in the Welsh preliminary squad.

In a warm-up test before the European Cup, he made a try-scoring international rugby league début in Wales 13–6 defeat by Italy in October 2010. He scored again in his next international vs Scotland. In the final game of the tournament, Thomas was appointed captain, filling in for the injured Lee Briers. He scored a try in that game, helping Wales to a one-point win for both the European Cup Trophy and a spot in the 2011 Rugby League Four Nations.

On 9 July 2011, Thomas confirmed on Twitter that he had broken his left arm during the 38–10 defeat by Hull Kingston Rovers, and expected to be sidelined for two months. After missing the rest of the season and failing to reach 100% fitness before the 2011 Rugby League Four Nations tournament, on 25 October 2011 Thomas announced his immediate retirement.

== Personal life ==
Thomas was born in Sarn near Bridgend in July 1974. In 2001 he married Jemma Thomas, whom he met when both were teenagers, in St Brides Major, near Bridgend. During the marriage, Jemma suffered three miscarriages. They filed for a divorce in 2007, which was finalised in 2009.

In December 2009, Thomas publicly announced that he is gay. He told the Daily Mail, "I don't want to be known as a gay rugby player. I am a rugby player, first and foremost. I am a man". Thomas's public confirmation of his sexuality made him the first openly gay professional rugby union player. In an interview with the BBC, Thomas talked about how he hoped that his coming out would mean that in the future, a young gay rugby player would be able to come out and be accepted as a "talented gay rugby player". Thomas also said, "What I choose to do when I close the door at home has nothing to do with what I have achieved in rugby". Since then, Thomas has been a vocal supporter of the NSPCC and ChildLine, a telephone counselling service operated by the NSPCC for children and young people. In an interview, Thomas commented, "I don't know if my life is going to be easier because I'm out, but if it helps someone else, if it makes one young lad pick up the phone to ChildLine, then it will have been worth it".

He had a major health scare in February 2006. He had received a blow to his neck during a match; then later on while watching a televised recording of an interview he had given regarding his part in the resignation of Welsh coach Mike Ruddock, he fell ill and was rushed to hospital with a suspected stroke, which was brought on by a ruptured artery in his neck. It was feared that this could lead to his retirement, but he resumed playing at the start of the 2006–07 French rugby season.

His way of celebrating tries by slapping his head comes from a popular celebration among Cardiff City supporters known as "the Ayatollah".

His autobiography Proud, co-written with Michael Calvin, won Sports Book of the Year in 2015.

On 17 November 2018, Thomas was assaulted in Cardiff because of his sexuality. He requested that South Wales Police deal with the 16-year-old assailant by way of restorative justice.

On 14 September 2019, Thomas announced that he is HIV positive, with undetectable status, meaning that he is not infectious. On the following day he competed in the Ironman Wales event in Tenby, finishing 413th out of 2,039, having vowed to "break the stigma" around the illness. After feeling media pressure to do so and for National HIV Testing Week, Thomas also filmed a documentary with Prince Harry, Duke of Sussex and the Terrence Higgins Trust, which aired a few days later on 18 September. Publicising the documentary that morning, he told an interviewer for BBC Radio 5 Live that a journalist had revealed his HIV status to his parents before he had had the opportunity to do so himself. While Thomas declined to name the journalist or the paper they write for, he did say "everybody will know, especially of late", leading the Press Gazette to suggest it could be The Sun, given they had been criticised the previous day for reporting about the family of England cricketer Ben Stokes. A BBC documentary, Gareth Thomas: HIV and Me, aired in September 2019.

Thomas was appointed Commander of the Order of the British Empire (CBE) in the 2020 Birthday Honours for services to sport and health.

In 2022, Thomas was accused of "deceptively" transmitting HIV to a previous partner. Thomas settled the case for £75,000 plus costs "without admitting liability or guilt".

== Film ==
In November 2011, actor Mickey Rourke said that he was planning to portray Thomas in a movie of his life; the film was due to start filming in February 2013. Thomas was later reported to be working with a writer on the script of the biopic. In March 2012, on the RTÉ programme Craig Doyle Live, Thomas announced that Tom Hardy was in talks to play him in the film. Rourke announced that he had given back the part to the producers. The film project later fell through, but Thomas said in 2015 that he was working on a new film with a different writer.

== Media career ==
Thomas was an analyst for ITV Sport's coverage of the Rugby World Cup tournaments in 2011, 2015 and 2019.

In January 2012, Thomas was a housemate in the ninth series of Celebrity Big Brother, and finished third overall on the final night. The same year, Thomas made a cameo appearance as himself in an episode of the Sky 1 comedy drama Stella. Thomas is also one of 8 celebrities chosen to participate in an intense week learning Welsh in an eco-friendly chic campsite in Pembrokeshire in the series cariad@iaith:love4language shown on S4C in May 2012.

In November 2012, he hinted to an audience of 300 people that he may be appearing in an ice dancing show and in December 2012, he was formally announced as one of the contestants, due to take part in the eighth series of ITV's Dancing on Ice in January 2013. His partner was Robin Johnstone. He was at or near the top of the leader board every week. In week 9, he suffered nausea and motion sickness whilst practising his "flying" routine, and was advised not to perform it and afterwards was advised to drop out of the series because of this.

On 18 January 2015, Thomas took part in celebrity talent show Get Your Act Together. He features in the Pinc List of leading Welsh LGBT figures.

In 2017, Thomas participated in the fourth series of The Jump. He withdrew on 7 March 2017, and Lydia Bright replaced him for the final.

In 2023, Thomas participated in the fifth celebrity series of SAS: Who Dares Wins.

Sporting positions
Preceded by Brian O'Driscoll; Tour captain Martin Corry active captain	British & Irish Lions captain O'Driscoll; Remained tour captain July 2005 as active captain	Succeeded by Paul O'Connell
