= Christian Loader =

Welsh rugby union player

- Born: Christian David Loader; 26 October 1973 (age 53) Neath, Wales
- Height: 180 cm (5 ft 11 in)
- Weight: 117 kg (18 st 6 lb)
- Occupation: Teacher at Dwr Y Felin

Rugby union career
- Position: Prop
Amateur team(s)
Years	Team	Apps	(Points)
	Pontypridd RFC	24	(69)
–	Bath Rugby		
–	Bridgend RFC		
International career
Years	Team	Apps	(Points)
1995–1997	Wales	19	(100)

Christian David Loader (Born 26 October 1973) is a former Welsh rugby union player who played prop. He achieved 19 Wales caps between 1995 and 1997. Loader played for Pontypridd RFC and Bath Rugby. He retired in 2006. Chris Loader is currently a head of year at Dŵr-Y-Felin.
