= Bridgend Ravens =

Welsh rugby union football club

(Wales) Bridgend Ravens RFC
- Nickname(s): Ravens; The Bridge
- Founded: 1878
- Location: Bridgend, Wales
- Ground: Dunraven Brewery Field (Capacity: 8,000 – 1,100 seated)
- Chairman: Norman Spain
- Coach: Scott Baldwin
- Captain: Zac O'Driscoll
- League: Super Rygbi Cymru
- 2024-25: Super Rygbi Cymru, 7th
1st kit	2nd kit

Official website
- www.bridgendravens.co.uk

The logo of Bridgend RFC until 2004.

Bridgend Ravens (Welsh: Cigfrain Pen-y-bont) (formerly Bridgend RFC) are a semi-professional rugby union club based in Bridgend, South Wales.

They currently play in Super Rygbi Cymru and are a feeder club to the Ospreys regional team.

== Origin ==
Bridgend RFC first formed a team in 1878, playing and losing to Newport RFC in the final of the South Wales Challenge Cup. However, the club was only established de facto after the first general meeting of the club was held at the York Hotel, Bridgend on 11 April 1880.

The first AGM confirmed the first full season's results for 1879–80: the club played 11 matches with six wins, three defeats and two draws. A profit of £3.9s.3d. was recorded.

The first captain of the club was F. Sadler. The first international cap won by a player from the club was Ben Gronow, winning the first of his four union caps in 1910.

== Home grounds ==
Prior to the First World War, the club were mainly based at the Quarella ground, but were forced to move out when it was taken over for building purposes. The club obtained the Brewery Field in 1920, which has been their home on and off ever since. The club's first exile from the Brewery Field began in 1928, when the ground had been taken over by a greyhound racing syndicate. They moved to Uxilla Fields, where Jubilee Crescent now stands, it had been the home of the old Bridgend Town AFC which had gone out of business by that time. The first match at their new base was a 16–4 victory over Newport RFC. The club did not remain at the ground for very long, as they returned to the Brewery Field in 1935, however, a second exile would begin 14 years later which had serious implications for the club.

Season 1948–49 saw a newly created Bridgend Rugby League step in and acquire a three-year lease of the Brewery Field, which saw Bridgend RFC homeless. The club were on the verge of going out of existence, but help came from the Bridgend Urban District Council who offered the club the Bandstand Field on their Newbridge Fields recreation grounds. Initially, teams had to use Island Farm prisoner of war camp for changing facilities until a pavilion was erected by the club right next to the ground, which is still being used by Bridgend Sports RFC to this day. When the Bridgend Urban District Council eventually proceeded towards purchase of the Brewery Field by the way of a Compulsory Purchase Order, the club was granted a 21-year lease, with an option of renew for another 21 years.

The club knew they were going back to the Brewery Field in 1957, following the issue of the lease, finding the ground in a poor state of repair. Most of the outside fencing was laid to the ground, essential services including water, heating, lighting and drainage were wrecked and needed to be completely re-installed. Other repairs and building work took place over several months and just in time for the 1957–58 season and the club have remained there ever since.

== Honours ==
Bridgend RFC won their first unofficial Welsh Championship in season 1963–64 under the captaincy of Marsden Young, playing a total of 49 games, with 39 wins, 5 drawn matches and losing just 5, it was also the first season that the club didn't lose a home game. In fact, between 26 April 1963 and 3 January 1966, the club went 70 successive home game without defeat. The club won the titles again in 1966, 1970 and 1971.

Bridgend have appeared in the WRU Challenge Cup final on five occasions since the competition's formation in 1971–72 season. 1979 saw the club beat Pontypridd RFC 18–12 in the final, lifting the trophy for the first time, retaining it a season later by beating Swansea RFC 15–9 in 1980. This was followed by being beaten finalists the next two seasons and both times losing to Cardiff RFC, one of which was lost on try count. Bridgend played in the 1990 final but were beaten 16–10 by Neath RFC. The club are the current holders of the cup after beating Pontypridd RFC 19–15 on 3 May 2015 The winning cup finals were:

- 1979 – Bridgend 18 Pontypridd 12
- 1980 – Bridgend 15 Swansea 9
- 2015 – Bridgend 19 Pontypridd 15

The Snelling Sevens was a WRU seven-a-side tournament that ran from 1954 until 1995, with Bridgend RFC appearing in the final on twelve occasions, winning six. The six wins in the final were:

- 1968 – Bridgend 13 Pontypool 10
- 1974 – Bridgend 30 Swansea 14
- 1975 – Bridgend 32 Cardiff 12
- 1978 – Bridgend 38 Cardiff 16
- 1980 – Bridgend 24 Newport 16
- 1987 – Bridgend 34 Newport 12

The club hadn't been very successful since the advert of professional rugby, but 2003 saw the club lift the Welsh Premier Division title, in what was the last season before regional rugby became the top tier of Welsh rugby. The team secured the title after a 22–13 win over Neath RFC at the Brewery Field with two games to spare, tries from Sililo Martens, Jon Thiel and Gareth Cull, with the latter scoring a drop goal from 35 meters to seal the victory and the first title in over 20 years. They had won 14 out of 16 league games that season.

Season 2010–11 saw the club lift the Division One West crown with 4 games to spare after beating title rivals Bonymaen RFC 25–19.

- Welsh Premier Division – 2003
- WRU Challenge Cup – 1979, 1980, 2015
- Snelling Sevens – 1968, 1974, 1975, 1978, 1980, 1987
- Floodlight Alliance – 1967
- David Chinn Memorial Trophy Winners – 2011
- WRU Division One West Champions – 2010/11
- WRU Premiership/Relegation Play-off winners – 2010–11

== International opposition ==
Bridgend RFC have hosted a number of touring teams throughout their history, the first being against Wolfhounds in season 1966–67, losing 11–5. The first game against international opposition was Italy in season 1971–72 with Bridgend running out 57–0 winners. New Zealand paid a visit in 1978 to help celebrate 100 years of the club's existence, the visitors winning 17–6. Australia arrived in 1981 with Bridgend winning 12–9, one of the most historic matches in the club's history. Wins against Western Samoa and a Wales XV occurred later in the 1980s. Tonga arrived in Bridgend in 1997 and won 21–18. The Brewery Field has hosted a number of Wales age-grade and Wales women's international matches.

== Recent times ==
Until 1995 rugby union was a strictly amateur sport, when the switch to professional status occurred Wales struggled to come to grips with it. Masses of foreign players and generally poor results by Welsh clubs in European competition inevitably affected the national sides fortunes. During the early years of professional rugby, Bridgend struggled on and off the pitch and at one point in 1998 the club was on the verge of closure. The turn of the century saw an upturn in fortunes for the Bridgend club, they qualified for Heineken Cup and in 2003 won the Welsh Premiership title. It was around that time that the WRU could no longer sustain funding a 9-team premier league, under the then new chief executive David Moffett, he proposed cutting in the number of top-flight teams down to 4, with clubs joining forces to create new identities. Eventually it was agreed that five regional teams would be created to play in the Celtic League and Heineken Cup competitions, with Bridgend joining forces with Pontypridd RFC to create the Celtic Warriors. Following this, Bridgend become a semi-professional team and play in the Welsh Premier Division, which now become the second tier of Welsh rugby.

The Celtic Warriors contained the best players from the Bridgend and Pontypridd clubs, famous Welsh international players including Neil Jenkins and Gareth Thomas donned the Warriors shirt. They were, however, not without their problems on the field; despite not being able to field their international players for long periods during the season (due to 2003 Rugby World Cup and 2004 Six Nations Championship), the side were competitive, finishing 4th in the Celtic League and going very close to making the quarter-finals of the Heineken Cup. Following an incredible 14–9 away victory at London Wasps in the Heineken Cup a crowd of 10,000 crammed into the Brewery Field for the return clash 5 days later (which the team lost 17–12) with the gate giving hope and optimism for the future of the region. Unfortunately, a series of problems throughout the season ended with the closure of the region at the end of the season. Pontypridd RFC's half of the region had to be sold during the early days of the season due their financial problems, with their half being given to the Welsh Rugby Union. The other 50% was also sold at the end of the season and the WRU decided to close the team down due to financial problems.

For Bridgend RFC, their defence of the title during 2003–04 was never realised, they recruited players from their old academy and from local clubs and remained competitive throughout. The name Bridgend RFC is owned by the former owner of the Celtic Warriors, Leighton Samuel. In order to concentrate on the Celtic Warriors, Samuel decided to withdraw his financial backing of Bridgend RFC. Fans and businessmen of the area resurrected the team, naming it Bridgend Ravens. The name comes from the nickname of the former Bridgend RFC club, who were known as the Ravens. After the Celtic Warriors folded, Bridgend Ravens had two superb seasons on the pitch, finishing 3rd in 2004–05 and 2nd in 2005–06 in the Welsh Premier Division. From then on financial problems had affected the club, eventually the only income streams came from WRU funding, sponsorship and gate receipts, the club didn't own the Brewery Field and were renting to play there which cut out a chunk of potential income streams. The club eventually had some control of their home back, going into partnership with Bridgend Town F.C. to take 50% ownership of the ground. Despite this, a series of disastrous results during season 2008–09 saw the club finish bottom of the Welsh Premier Division and were relegated out of the top flight for the first time in their history.

Many expected Bridgend to bounce straight back up from WRU Division One West in 2009–10, but a title challenge never got going, with many of the squad from the previous season having defected elsewhere and a change of coaching staff, the club found life very difficult and a terrible start to the season ensured that they were in a relegation battle throughout the season. The team did pick up some form by the end of the season and finished 9th out of 12 and 9 points clear of the final relegation spot, ensuring survival with a 59–27 victory at relegated Cwmllynfell RFC.

The future of the club looks brighter now since significant investment is being made by a company called Llandarcy Park Ltd which is believed to have secured the long-term future of the club. In addition, the club appointed Steve Tandy as their new head coach from season 2010–11. In 2011, Bridgend won the WRU Division One West title with 4 games to spare, tries from Gareth Howells, Steve Tandy and Luke Morgan, plus 10 points from the boot of Daniel Griffiths gave them a 25–19 victory over Bonymaen RFC to take the title. The club won a play-off final against Glamorgan Wanderers RFC with the scoreline of 38–19, meaning that they returned to the Welsh Premier Division for 2011–12 season after a two-year absence from the top flight.

Bridgend's return to the Premier Division surpassed expectations. The club finished 8th. Initially, however, just a week into the start of the 2011–12 season, Bridgend, along with 3 other Premiership clubs, were delivered news that they would not be included in the new 10-team premiership for 2012–13 onwards. This was because the club had come 11th on league finishing positions over the course of six seasons, the time spent outside the top flight hit them considerably. However, some months later they were given a reprieve, along with fellow club Carmarthen Quins, after a decision to increase to 12 teams.

For 2012–13 season, the club changed playing personnel. New signings include Alex Jones (Newport), Ashleigh James (Neath), Scott Hicks (Tonmawr) among others. There was also a change in coaching personal, Steve Tandy left the club during the second half of the previous season to become the new head coach of the Ospreys, with player Ben Rose named as his replacement, initially on an interim basis, but then was handed the job on a permanent basis. Daniel Griffiths retired from playing to become backs coach, whilst ex-Cardiff hooker Paul Young joined as forwards coach. The club also made its debut in the British and Irish Cup, battling with rivals Cardiff, as well as English championship powerhouse Bristol RFC and Ulster Ravens, a team composed of academy and local players from the Ulster province. At the end of the 2012–13 season Head Coach Ben Rose decided to step down from his role. Backs coach Dan Griffiths was appointed an Ospreys coach and leaving coaching vacancies at the club.

For the 2013–14 season Mike Hook (formerly Pontypool RFC head coach) was employed as backs coach to work alongside Paul Young with no head coach in place. Ravens coaching team announced The new coaching duo selected Ashleigh James as captain and James Dixon as Vice Captain. Ravens captain for 2013–14 season

Despite a poor league campaign during the 2014–15 season, the club were to be successful in the Swalec Cup competition lifting the cup for the first time in 35 years. Bridgend accounted for Cardiff (22–12), Llanharan (20–10), Merthyr (20–17) and Carmarthen Quins (22–20) on the way to facing Pontypridd in the final at the Millennium Stadium in Cardiff, with 14 points from the boot of Owen Howe and a try by Tom O'Flaherty securing a 19–15 victory.

2015–16 was a season of change for Bridgend. After the elation of winning the SWALEC Cup in May 2015, the club saw a number of its leading players depart the club including captain Ashleigh James (who left for Pontypridd), Andrew Waite (who left for Bedwas), Owen Howe & Gary Carpenter (who both left for Cross Keys) amongst the 11 key squad members who left. Mike Hook took sole charge of the team as Head Coach and was to be assisted by Dean Ronan. Bridgend got off to a terrible start to the campaign, suffering 6 straight defeats in the Principality Premiership. However, the corner was well and truly turned with an important 20–34 win at the Gnoll against Neath. Bridgend then went on to beat Cardiff, Bedwas and Pontypridd as part of a four match winning streak in the division. A long winless run in the Premiership saw Bridgend go until March without tasting victory before they won at home with a last minute try against basement side Neath. Impressive wins against Cardiff (a) and Carmarthen Quins (h) saw the Ravens finish the season in tenth place, the club confirmed shortly after that Head Coach Mike Hook had left the club along with Assistant Dean Ronan.

In the summer of 2016, Bridgend confirmed the appointment of Matt Silva as head coach and who endured a slow start to the Premiership campaign, just one win in the first five games was then followed by a three-match winning streak which saw the ravens account for eventual league winners Merthyr RFC by a 40–10 scoreline. The surprise victory against Merthyr took Bridgend into the top half of the league and hopes were boosted that they could finish there before the league splits in half for the second half of the season, unfortunately Bridgend went on nine match losing streak which saw the club finish 13th out of 16 teams prior to the league split. With the club placed in the second tier of the Premiership results were to improve, wins against Llanelli, Swansea, Cardiff and Bargoed put the Ravens in with a chance of finishing in a play-off spot, however, they were to miss out on the final game of the season, going down 21–10 to Neath. Despite the league struggles, Bridgend did win their Foster's Challenge Cup group, winning five out of six matches, but were knocked out of the tournament at the semi-final stage, losing 55–13 to eventual winners Bedwas.

For season 2017/18, the club has retained the services of head coach Matt Silva and much of the previous season's squad. There have been some notable signings including centre Nathan Edwards who joins for a second stint from Llanelli. The Premiership top try scorer from the previous season Aaron Grabham who touched down 28 times for Neath in season 2016/17 joins Bridgend from Neath. Local talents Jacob Lloyd and Chris John are further additions reinforcing Bridgend's commitment to development.

Season 2017/18 has also seen the club return to the 'raven on the bridge' logo which is synonymous with the club's famous history.

Season 2018/19 saw Bridgend Ravens almost relegated to the Welsh Championship. Bridgend won four of their last five games to avoid relegation.

Prior to the 2019/20 season, coach Matt Silva left his role and Bridgend handed Steve Jones the Head Coach role. Bridgend also introduced a successful early bird membership scheme, securing almost 500 committed supporters for the new season. Bridgend also launched a new website, with an online shop to be also launched. The online shop will be a way of purchasing the new Bridgend home and alternate kits, which retain Bridgend's traditional colours of white and blue for the home kit and yellow, navy blue and white for the away strip.

== Management team, coaches and other staff ==
- President - Meredydd James
- Chairman - Norman Spain
- Secretary - Tony Williams
- Stadium Manager - Robin Thomas
- Media Officer - Aled Thomas
- Media Assistant & Membership Coordinator - Chris Edmunds
- Graphic Designer - Rhyd Cole
- Social Media Assistant - Rob Steele
- Head Coach - Scott Baldwin
- Team Manager - Jason Bessant
- Assistant Coach - Matthew Morgan
- Assistant Coach - James Dixon
- Assistant Coach - Ben Thomas
- Strength & Conditioning - Ryan Speight
- Sports Therapist- Gareth Davies
- Osteopath - Zoe Adams
- Sports Therapist - Ella Skryme
- Team Doctor - Dr Jon Troube
- Masseuse - Sophie Newton
- Kit Master - Ian 'Dickie' Evans
- Club Chaplain - Martin Gillard
- Club Mascot - Ronnie the Raven
- Junior Ravens Coordinator - Maureen Wilkinson

== Season results ==
=== Bridgend Ravens ===
- 2017–18 – 10th (of 16) Principality Welsh Premiership (Regular Season); 6th (of 8) Principality Welsh Premiership Tier 2; Last 16 of WRU Challenge Cup (knocked out by Ebbw Vale 13–33)
- 2016–17 – 13th (of 16) Principality Welsh Premiership (Regular Season); 5th (of 8) Principality Welsh Premiership Tier 2; Last 16 of WRU Challenge Cup (knocked out by RGC 1404 RFC 31–20)
- 2015–16 – 10th (of 12) Principality Welsh Premiership; Last 16 of Swalec Cup (knocked out by Cross Keys RFC 20–13)
- 2014–15 – 11th (of 12) Principality Welsh Premiership; Winners of Swalec Cup (Defeated Pontypridd RFC 19–15)
- 2013–14 – 9th (of 12) Principality Welsh Premiership; Round 1 of Swalec Cup (knocked out by Aberavon RFC 21–19)
- 2012–13 – 11th (of 12) Principality Welsh Premiership; Round 2 of Swalec Cup (knocked out by Bargoed RFC 17–13)
- 2011–12 – 8th (of 14) Principality Welsh Premiership; Round 2 of Swalec Cup (knocked out by Carmarthen Quins RFC 20–18)
- 2010–11 – 1st (of 12) Swalec League Division One West; Round 3 of Swalec Cup (knocked out by Cardiff RFC 30–20)
- 2009–10 – 9th (of 12) Swalec League Division One West; Round 1 of Swalec Cup (knocked out by Tonmawr RFC 41–5)
- 2008–09 – 14th (of 14) Principality Welsh Premiership; Round 5 of Swalec Cup (knocked out by Newport RFC 44–7)
- 2007–08 – 12th (of 14) Principality Welsh Premiership; Quarter-final of Konica Minolta Cup (knocked out by Pontypridd RFC 41–11)
- 2006–07 – 11th (of 14) Principality Welsh Premiership; Semi-final of Konica Minolta Cup (knocked out by Cardiff RFC 23–16)
- 2005–06 – 2nd (of 14) Principality Welsh Premiership; Round four of Konica Minolta Cup (knocked out by Neath RFC 11–3)
- 2004–05 – 3rd (of 17) WRU National League; Semi-final of Konica Minolta Cup (knocked out by Llanelli RFC 20–10)
- 2003–04 – 7th (of 16) WRU National League; Semi-final of Konica Minolta Cup (knocked out by Neath RFC 29 – 14)

=== Bridgend RFC ===
- 2002–03 – 1st (of 9) in WRU National League; 7th (of 8) in Pool B of Celtic League; Semi-final of Principality Cup (lost to Newport 27–23)
- 2001–02 – 9th (of 11) in Welsh-Scottish League; 6th (of 8) in Pool A of Celtic League; Quarter-final of Principality Cup (lost to Llanelli 46–24)
- 2000–01 – 5th (of 11) in Welsh-Scottish League; Quarter-final of Principality Cup (lost to Neath 23–21)
- 1999–00 – 9th (of 11) in Welsh-Scottish League
- 1998–99 – 6th (of 8) in WRU National League
- 1997–98 – 7th (of 8) in WRU National League
- 1996–97 – 8th (of 12) in WRU National League
- 1995–96 – 5th (of 12) in Heineken League
- 1994–95 – 5th (of 12) in Heineken League
- 1993–94 – 6th (of 12) in Heineken League
- 1992–93 – 6th (of 12) in Heineken League
- 1991–92 – 4th (of 10) in Heineken League

== Notable former players ==
Note: The following players play(ed) for Bridgend RFC or Bridgend Ravens. For Celtic Warriors players, please see the Celtic Warriors article.

See also Category:Bridgend RFC players

- (Wales) Ryan Bevington
- (Wales) Andrew Bishop
- (Wales) David Bryant
- (Wales) John Devereux
- (Wales) Kevin Ellis
- (Wales) Steve Fenwick
- (Wales) Mike Griffiths
- (Wales) Ben Gronow
- (Wales) Michael Hall
- (Tonga) Aisea Havili
- (Wales) Grahame Hodgson
- (Wales) Chris Horsman
- (Wales) Robert Howley
- (Wales) Fred Hutchinson
- (Wales) Dafydd James
- (Wales) Adam Jones
- (Wales) Deiniol Jones
- (Wales) Ryan Jones
- (Wales) John Lloyd
- (Wales) Christian Loader
- (New Zealand) Simon Mannix
- (Tonga) Sililo Martens
- (Tonga) Maama Molitika
- (England) Tom O'Flaherty
- (Wales) Gareth Powell Williams
- (Wales) Gareth Prothero
- (Wales) Jamie Ringer
- (Spain) Oriol Ripol
- (Wales) Peter Rogers
- (Canada) Gareth Rowlands
- (Wales) Ian Stephens
- (Canada) Jon Thiel
- (Wales) Gareth Thomas
- (Wales) Nathan Thomas
- (Wales) Rhys Webb
- (Wales) Glen Webbe
- (England) Julian White
- (Wales) Gareth John Williams
- (Wales) Gerald Williams
- (Wales) J. J. Williams
- (Wales) J. P. R. Williams
- (Wales) Jeff Young

== Games played against international opposition ==
Year	Date	Opponent	Result	Score	Tour
1978	13 December	New Zealand	Loss	6–17	1978 New Zealand rugby union tour of Britain and Ireland
1981	28 October	Australia	Win	12–9	1981–82 Australia rugby union tour of Britain and Ireland
1988	21 October	Samoa	Win	21–17	1988 Western Samoa rugby union tour of Britain and Ireland
1997	9 November	Tonga	Loss	18-21	1997 Tonga rugby union tour of Great Britain
