= Gwyn Jones (rugby union) =

Wales international rugby union player

- Born: Rhodri Gwyn Jones; 5 October 1972 (age 54) Swansea, Wales
- Height: 6 ft 0 in (183 cm)
- Weight: 15 st 0 lb (210 lb; 95 kg)

Rugby union career
- Position: Flanker
Amateur team(s)
| Years | Team | Apps | (Points) |
- Cardiff Medicals RFC
| – | Cardiff RFC | | |
International career
| Years | Team | Apps | (Points) |
| 1996-1997 | Wales | 13 | (5) |

Rhodri Gwyn Jones (born 6 October 1972) is a former Wales international rugby union player. Jones played as a flanker and won 13 caps for Wales over a period of two years before a spinal injury ended his rugby career in December 1997.

== Early life ==
Jones was born in Swansea in 1972. He was educated at Ysgol Gynradd Gymraeg Pontybrenin, then Ysgol Gyfun Gwŷr. He went on to Llandovery College and then Cardiff Medical School, where he played for Cardiff Medicals RFC.

== Rugby career ==
Jones captained Wales at under 15 and under 17 level. He also won five caps for the under 18 level. He soon progressed to the Senior stage winning 13 caps for Wales, five of which as captain. He was the 109th Captain of Wales. His first cap was against Italy in 1996 and his last against New Zealand in 1997. Jones scored one international try.

Jones suffered a spinal injury playing in his normal position of open-side flanker for his club Cardiff against Swansea in December 1997. For five days after the accident he was unable to move from the chest down even though X-rays showed his spinal cord to be severely compressed rather than broken.

At the time of the accident, he was 25 years old, captain of Wales and having attained 13 caps was expected to have a long and distinguished playing career. Jones never played again, but after an operation and extensive rehabilitation, which included learning to stand and walk again, he recovered sufficiently to develop a career as a rugby critic on both English and Welsh-language television and returned to his career as a doctor in Cardiff.

In 2002 the Welsh Rugby Former International Players' Association and the Welsh Rugby Union honoured Jones with a Bravery Award.

His great uncle, Ivor Jones, was capped by Wales and toured Australia and New Zealand in 1930 with the British and Irish Lions and also served as president of the Welsh Rugby Union.
