= 1988 Wales rugby union tour of New Zealand =

Summary
| P | W | D | L |
Total
| 8 | 2 | 1 | 5 |
Test match
| 2 | 0 | 0 | 2 |
Opponent
| P | W | D | L |
New Zealand
| 2 | 0 | 0 | 2 |

Tour chronology
- ← 1986 Oceania 1990 Namibia →

The Wales national rugby union team toured New Zealand in May and June 1988. They played eight matches, including two tests against New Zealand (the All Blacks).

The tour was not a success for Wales, losing both tests by heavy scores, and only winning two of the six matches against regional teams. The itinerary was a hard one and New Zealand coach Alex Wyllie said he would not have accepted a similar fixture list for his team. The team suffered badly from injuries and had to add six extra players during the course of the tour. Original tour captain Bleddyn Bowen broke his wrist in the second game and was replaced as skipper by Bob Norster, until he suffered a badly gashed knee, whereupon Jonathan Davies took over the captaincy.

== Matches ==
| Date | Venue | Home | Score | Away |
|---|---|---|---|---|
| 18 May 1988 | Rugby Park, Hamilton | Waikato | 28–19 | Welsh XV |
| 21 May 1988 | Athletic Park, Wellington | Wellington | 38–22 | Welsh XV |
| 24 May 1988 | Carisbrook, Dunedin | Otago | 13–15 | Welsh XV |
| 28 May 1988 | Lancaster Park, Christchurch | New Zealand | 52–3 | Wales |
| 1 June 1988 | McLean Park, Napier | Hawke's Bay | 18–45 | Welsh XV |
| 4 June 1988 | Rugby Park, New Plymouth | Taranaki | 13–13 | Welsh XV |
| 7 June 1988 | Okara Park, Whangārei | North Auckland | 27–9 | Welsh XV |
| 11 June 1988 | Eden Park, Auckland | New Zealand | 54–9 | Wales |

=== New Zealand vs Wales (1st test) ===
28 May 1988

| New Zealand | 52–3 | Wales |
| Try: Kirwan (4); Wright (2); Deans; Gallagher; Shelford; G. Whetton; Con: Fox (6) | Report | Pen: Ring |

Lancaster Park, Christchurch
Attendance: 35,000

=== New Zealand vs Wales (2nd test) ===
11 June 1988

| New Zealand | 54–9 | Wales |
| Try: Kirwan (2); Wright (2); Deans; Jones; McDowall; Taylor; Con: Fox (8); Pen: Fox (2) | Report | Try: J. Davies; Con: Ring; Pen: Ring |

Eden Park, Auckland
Attendance: 45,000

== Squad ==
- Manager: R. Morgan
- Coach: Tony Gray
- Assistant coach: Derek Quinnell
- Captain: Bleddyn Bowen, subsequently Bob Norster then Jonathan Davies

| Name | Position | Notes |
|---|---|---|
| Jonathan Mason | Full-back | Replacement during tour |
| Tony Clement | Full-back | |
| Steve Bowling | Full-back | |
| Mark Ring | Three-quarter | |
| Mike Hall | Three-quarter | |
| Ieuan Evans | Three-quarter | |
| John Devereux | Three-quarter | |
| Nigel Davies | Three-quarter | |
| Glen Webbe | Three-quarter | |
| Carwyn Davies | Three-quarter | |
| Jonathan Davies | Half-back | |
| Jonathan Griffiths | Half-back | |
| Robert Jones | Half-back | |
| Staff Jones | Forward | |
| Ian Watkins | Forward | |
| Dai Young | Forward | |
| Kevin Moseley | Forward | |
| Phil May | Forward | |
| Rowland Phillips | Forward | |
| David Bryant | Forward | |
| Gary Jones | Forward | Replacement during tour |
| Mark Jones | Forward | Replacement during tour |
| Kevin Phillips | Forward | |
| Bob Norster | Forward | |
| Paul Moriarty | Forward | |
| Tim Fauvel | Forward | |
| Anthony Buchanan | Forward | |
| Jeremy Pugh | Forward | |
| Phil May | Forward | |
| Richie Collins | Forward | |
| Mark Pugh | Forward | Replacement during tour |
| Steve Sutton | Forward | Replacement during tour |

== See also ==
- History of rugby union matches between New Zealand and Wales
