= Phil May =

Philip or Phil May may refer to:

- Phil May (caricaturist) (1864–1903), English caricaturist
- Phil May (cricketer) or Percy May (1884–1965), English cricketer
- Phil May (singer) (1944–2020), English vocalist
- Phil May (athlete) (1944–2014), Australian Olympic athlete
- Phil May (rugby union) (born 1956), Welsh rugby union player
- Philip May (born 1957), British investment relationship manager, husband of former British prime minister Theresa May
