= 1995 Wales rugby union tour of South Africa =

- Manager: Alex Evans
- Tour captain: Jonathan Humphreys
Summary
| P | W | D | L |
Total
| 2 | 0 | 0 | 2 |
Test match
| 1 | 0 | 0 | 1 |
Opponent
| P | W | D | L |
South Africa
| 1 | 0 | 0 | 1 |

Tour chronology
- ← 1994 Canada/Oceania 1996 Australia →

The Wales national rugby union team toured South Africa in August and September 1995. They played two matches: a warm-up game against the South-East Transvaal provincial side, and a test match against the South Africa national team. The tour was held in part to thank South Africa for supporting Wales' bid to host the 1999 Rugby World Cup.

== Squad ==
Wales named a squad of 24 players for the tour, including five uncapped players. Ten of the squad had not been included in the Wales team that participated in the 1995 Rugby World Cup during May and June. Jonathan Humphreys was named the captain, despite only having played for the national team on two previous occasions. Cardiff wing Simon Hill was a late addition to the squad.

| Name | Position | Club | Notes |
|---|---|---|---|
| Jonathan Humphreys | Hooker | Cardiff | Captain |
| Garin Jenkins | Hooker | Swansea | |
| John Davies | Prop | Neath | |
| Ricky Evans | Prop | Llanelli | |
| Spencer John | Prop | Llanelli | |
| Christian Loader* | Prop | Swansea | |
| Paul Arnold | Lock | Swansea | |
| Derwyn Jones | Lock | Cardiff | |
| Andy Moore* | Lock | Swansea | |
| Greg Prosser | Lock | Pontypridd | |
| Mark Bennett | Back row | Cardiff | |
| Andrew Gibbs | Back row | Newbridge | |
| Emyr Lewis | Back row | Cardiff | |
| Paul John | Scrum-half | Pontypridd | |
| Andy Moore | Scrum-half | Cardiff | |
| Neil Jenkins | Fly-half | Pontypridd | |
| Aled Williams | Fly-half | Swansea | |
| Gareth Jones* | Centre | Bridgend | |
| Mark Taylor | Centre | Swansea | |
| Gareth Thomas | Centre | Bridgend | |
| Ieuan Evans | Wing | Llanelli | |
| Alan Harris* | Wing | Swansea | |
| Simon Hill | Wing | Cardiff | |
| Wayne Proctor | Wing | Llanelli | |
| Justin Thomas* | Full-back | Llanelli | |

* = Uncapped player

== Matches ==
| Date | Venue | Home | Score | Away |
|---|---|---|---|---|
| 29 August 1995 | Johann van Riebeeck Stadium, Witbank | South-East Transvaal | 47–6 | Wales |
| 2 September 1995 | Ellis Park Stadium, Johannesburg | South Africa | 40–11 | Wales |

=== South-East Transvaal vs Wales ===
Wales' only warm-up game was against South-East Transvaal on 29 August in Witbank. At the time, South-East Transvaal were playing in the third division of the Currie Cup, South Africa's provincial competition. They came into the game having won eleven successive matches in the competition. South-East Transvaal won the game comfortably by 47 points to 6. They scored five tries, and fly-half Jacques Benade kicked all five conversions as well as three penalties and a drop-goal. Wales' only points came through two penalties kicked by their fly-half Aled Williams.

29 August 1995

| South-East Transvaal | 47–6 | Wales |
| Try: Erasmus; Visagie; Bosman; Fourie; Bodenstein; Con: Benade (5); Pen: Benade (3); Drop: Benade | Report | Pen: A. Williams (2) |

Johann van Riebeeck Stadium, Witbank
Referee: I. Rogers (South Africa)

=== South Africa vs Wales ===
The test match against South Africa took place on 2 September at Ellis Park Stadium in Johannesburg. This was a week after the sport was declared "open" with restrictions on payments to players removed, making it the first test match of rugby union's professional era. This was the ninth test match between the countries, but only the second match since 1970. South Africa had won seven of the previous encounters, with one draw between the sides. As the reigning world champions following their victory in June, South Africa were overwhelming favourites to win the match.

South Africa won the game 40–11. Wales took an early lead when Mark Bennett scored a try in the third minute, immediately following which South Africa lock Kobus Wiese punched an unsighted Derwyn Jones, knocking him out. The incident was missed by the officials, and Wiese was not sanctioned during the match. South Africa responded through tries from Wiese and Francois Pienaar, and at half-time led by 18 points to 8. In the second-half, Wales' Neil Jenkins kicked a penalty to reduce the gap to seven points. South Africa then scored three tries in seven minutes to extend their lead to 29 points. A minute before the end of the match, Wales' Garin Jenkins punched South Africa's Joost van der Westhuizen. The punch, which knocked out Van der Westhuizen resulted in Jenkins being sent off by the referee.

Following the game, Wales invoked citing procedures against Wiese for the punch against Derwyn Jones. As a result of receiving a red card, Garin Jenkins also faced disciplinary proceedings. Both Wiese and Jenkins were banned from playing rugby for 30 days for their actions.

2 September 1995

| South Africa | 40–11 | Wales |
| Try: Wiese; Pienaar; Small; Teichmann; Mulder; Con: Stransky (3); Pen: Stransky (3) | Report | Try: Bennett; Pen: N. Jenkins (2) |

Ellis Park Stadium, Johannesburg
Referee: Joël Dumé (France)

| FB | 15 | André Joubert |
| RW | 14 | James Small |
| OC | 13 | Hennie le Roux |
| IC | 12 | Japie Mulder |
| LW | 11 | Jacques Olivier |
| FH | 10 | Joel Stransky |
| SH | 9 | Joost van der Westhuizen |
| N8 | 8 | Gary Teichmann |
| OF | 7 | Ruben Kruger |
| BF | 6 | Francois Pienaar (c) |
| RL | 5 | Kobus Wiese |
| LL | 4 | Mark Andrews |
| TP | 3 | Marius Hurter |
| HK | 2 | James Dalton |
| LP | 1 | Balie Swart |
Coach:
(South Africa) Kitch Christie

| FB | 15 | Justin Thomas |
| RW | 14 | Ieuan Evans |
| OC | 13 | Gareth Jones |
| IC | 12 | Gareth Thomas | | (substituted off) 68' |
| LW | 11 | Simon Hill |
| FH | 10 | Neil Jenkins |
| SH | 9 | Andy Moore |
| N8 | 8 | Hemi Taylor |
| OF | 7 | Mark Bennett |
| BF | 6 | Andrew Gibbs | | (substituted off) 41' |
| RL | 5 | Derwyn Jones | | (substituted off) 2' |
| LL | 4 | Paul Arnold |
| TP | 3 | John Davies |
| HK | 2 | Jonathan Humphreys (c) |
| LP | 1 | Christian Loader |
Replacements:
| LK | | Andy Moore | | (substituted on) 2' |
| HK | | Garin Jenkins | (red card) 79' | (substituted on) 41' |
| CE | | Mark Taylor | | (substituted on) 68' |
Coach:
(Australia) Alex Evans
