= Snelling Sevens =

Annual Welsh Rugby Union competition

The Snelling Sevens (also known as the Snelling Seven-a-Side Trophy and originally known as the Welsh Seven-a-Side Tournament) was an annual Welsh Rugby Union sevens competition that ran from 1954 until 1995.

The tournament was inaugurated in 1954 and the trophy presented by the Chairman of Newport Athletic Club, Reg Snelling, after whom the competition is named. The competition took place over a single day, and was originally a straightforward knockout tournament between 16 teams, with the initial draw taking place prior to the match day. The teams invited were the premier South Wales teams, but occasionally if a team was on tour at the time clubs were invited from other areas, including English teams such as Leicester and Bath. Ebbw Vale won the tournament in 1958. The squad included G Powell, M Williams, F Matthews, R Morgan, D Ackerman, D Barrett, R Evans, K Cameron, J Pugh. 1967 saw the introduction of the Bill Everson Award for the Man of the Tournament Trophy. In 1979, the competition changed format from a purely knockout tournament to a pool system with four groups of four teams followed by knockout rounds.

Despite the competition's popularity from the 1950s to the 1970s, crowds diminished from 50,000 at its peak to around 5,000 by the 1980s and early 1990s. In 1995, the competition was renamed as the "Worthington Sevens", but it was decided that, due to the congested timetables of the clubs involved, the tournament should cease to be held. The trophy was awarded permanently to Newport as the most successful club in the competition's history.

== Finals ==
Season	Winners	Losing Finalists	Score	Venue	Everson Award
1954	Newport	Ebbw Vale	6–0	Newport Athletic Club	
1955	Cardiff	Newport	8–3	Rodney Parade	
1956	Newport	Penarth	5–3	St Helens	
1957	Newport	Abertillery	11–8	St Helens	
1958	Ebbw Vale	Newport	10–5	Cardiff Arms Park	
1959	Newport	Pontypool	6–3	Rodney Parade	
1960	Llanelli	Penarth	14–10	Cardiff Arms Park	
1961	Newport	Pontypool	8–3	Cardiff Arms Park	
1962	Newport	Neath	19–3	St Helens	
1963	Newport	Bridgend	8–0	Cardiff Arms Park	
1964	Neath	Cardiff	10–5	Cardiff Arms Park	
1965	Newport	Newbridge	9–8	St Helens	
1966	Cardiff	Newport	23–20	Cardiff Arms Park	
1967	Newport	Cardiff	21–15	Cardiff Arms Park	David Watkins
1968	Bridgend	Pontypool	13–10	Cardiff Arms Park	J.J. Williams
1969	Cardiff	Llanelli	17–13	Cardiff Arms Park	Barry John
1970	Neath	Ebbw Vale	18–8	Cardiff Arms Park	David Parker
1971	Llanelli	Newport	31–10	Cardiff Arms Park	John Thomas
1972	Cardiff	Bridgend	15–4	Cardiff Arms Park	John Davies
1973	Llanelli	Newbridge	52–6	Cardiff Arms Park	Roy Bergiers
1974	Bridgend	Swansea	30–14	Cardiff Arms Park	Vivian Jenkins
1975	Bridgend	Cardiff	32–12	Cardiff Arms Park	Stuart Lane
1976	Cardiff	Newport	18–8	Cardiff Arms Park	Chris Camilleri
1977	Cardiff	Newport	24–16	Cardiff Arms Park	John Churchill
1978	Bridgend	Cardiff	38–16	Cardiff Arms Park	Gareth Powell Williams
1979	Llanelli	Ebbw Vale	26–16	Cardiff Arms Park	Peter Morgan
1980	Bridgend	Newport	24–16	Cardiff Arms Park	Gary Pierce
1981	Cardiff	Leicester	20–6	Cardiff Arms Park	Gwynfor Williams
1982	Swansea	Ebbw Vale	44–6	Cardiff Arms Park	Jeff Herdman
1983	Cardiff	Abertillery	44–6	Rodney Parade	Adrian Parry
1984	Cardiff	Newport	30–12	Rodney Parade	Mark Ring
1985	Newport	Glamorgan Wanderers	43–0	Rodney Parade	Steve Pill
1986	Glamorgan Wanderers	Cardiff	30–6	Rodney Parade	Nick Ward
1987	Bridgend	Newport	34–12	Rodney Parade	Aled Williams
1988	Llanelli	South Wales Police	40–4	Rodney Parade	Jonathan Davies
1989	Swansea	Bridgend	22–16	Rodney Parade	Mark Titley
1990	Newbridge	Bridgend	20–14	Rodney Parade	David Rees
1991	Swansea	Bridgend	20–18	Rodney Parade	Chris Bradshaw
1992	Newbridge	Swansea	28–24	Cardiff Arms Park	David Manley
1993	South Wales Police	Pontypridd	24–14	Cardiff Arms Park	Richie Collins
1994	Bath	Cardiff	42–5	Cardiff Arms Park	Audley Lumsden
1995	Swansea	Bridgend	29–28	Cardiff Arms Park	Robert Howley
