= Tim Fauvel =

- Full name: Timothy John Fauvel
- Born: 9 June 1960 (age 66) Bridgend, Wales

Rugby union career
- Position: No. 8
International career
Years	Team	Apps	(Points)
1988	Wales	1	(0)

Timothy John Fauvel (born 9 June 1960) is a Welsh former rugby union international.

Born in Bridgend, Fauvel was a back-row forward who played for Aberavon. Plagued at times by injury, which caused him to withdraw from Wales' 1986 Pacific tour, he gained his only Wales cap against the All Blacks on the tour of New Zealand two years later. He substituted No. 8 Paul Moriarty at half-time in the 1st Test, held at Lancaster Park in Christchurch. This gives him the distinction of being the last Aberavon player to have been capped for Wales.

== See also ==
- List of Wales national rugby union players
