= Phil John =

Phil John may refer to:

- Phil John (rugby union, born 1962), Welsh rugby union hooker
- Phil John (rugby union, born 1981), Welsh rugby union prop
- Philip John, screenwriter

== See also ==
- Phil and John, a Christian music duo
