= South Wales Police RFC =

- Full name: South Wales Police Rugby Football Club
- Founded: 1969
- Location: Bridgend, Wales
- Ground(s): Waterton Cross
- League(s): N/A
- 2009-10: 8th
Team kit

Official website
- southwalespolicerfc.co.uk

South Wales Police Rugby Football Club is a Welsh rugby union team based in Bridgend, South Wales. The club is a member of the Welsh Rugby Union and is a feeder club for the Ospreys. In 2012, they withdrew from the Welsh league system due to lack of players, they will continue to play in police competitions and may return to the Welsh league in the future.

== History ==
South Wales Police RFC was established in June 1969 when the rugby teams of four different police forces amalgamated. These police teams represented Cardiff City, Glamorgan, Merthyr Borough and Swansea Borough. The team's first match was during the 1969/70 season against Pontypridd RFC, a game the police won. In June 1971 the club gained membership to the Welsh Rugby Union forcing the players to choose between their 'civilian' clubs or to switch to the South Wales Police.

The club has since provided many players to the Welsh national team, including Bleddyn Bowen who captained Wales. The club's Senior XV are also one of the more active touring teams and have played in Africa, Europe, America and Asia.

== Club honours ==
- Snelling Sevens 1993 - Champions

== Tours ==
- 2007/08 season - Bermuda

Bermuda 10 - South Wales Police RFC 31

== Notable former players ==
- Bleddyn Bowen (23 caps), captained Wales whilst playing for South Wales Police RFC
- (Wales) Richie Collins (38 caps)
- (Wales) Richie Donovan (1 cap)
- (Wales) Alex Finlayson (3 caps)
- (Wales) Ian Hall (8 caps)
- (Wales) Hugh Williams-Jones (17 caps)
- (Wales) Mike Knill (1 cap)
- (Wales) Martyn Morris (11 caps)
- (Wales) Stuart Parfitt (3 caps)
- (Wales) Rowland Phillips (10 caps)
- (Wales) Steve Sutton (9 caps)
- (Wales) John Wakeford (2 caps)
