= Gareth Jones (rugby union, born 1975) =

- Full name: Gareth Huw Jones
- Born: 31 May 1975 (age 51) Ogwr, Mid Glamorgan, Wales
- Height: 5 ft 11 in (180 cm)
- Weight: 198 lb (90 kg)

Rugby union career
- Position: Centre / Wing
International career
Years	Team	Apps	(Points)
1995	Wales	1	(0)

Gareth Huw Jones (born 31 May 1975) is a Welsh former rugby union international.

Born in Ogwr, Jones was a three-quarter who was capped once for Wales as a 20-year old on the 1995 tour of South Africa. He played as a centre in the one-off Test against the Springboks at Ellis Park, Johannesburg.

Jones played at club level for Aberavon, Bridgend, Cardiff and Pontypridd.

== See also ==
- List of Wales national rugby union players
