= Black Welsh people =

Welsh people of black African/Afro-Caribbean descent

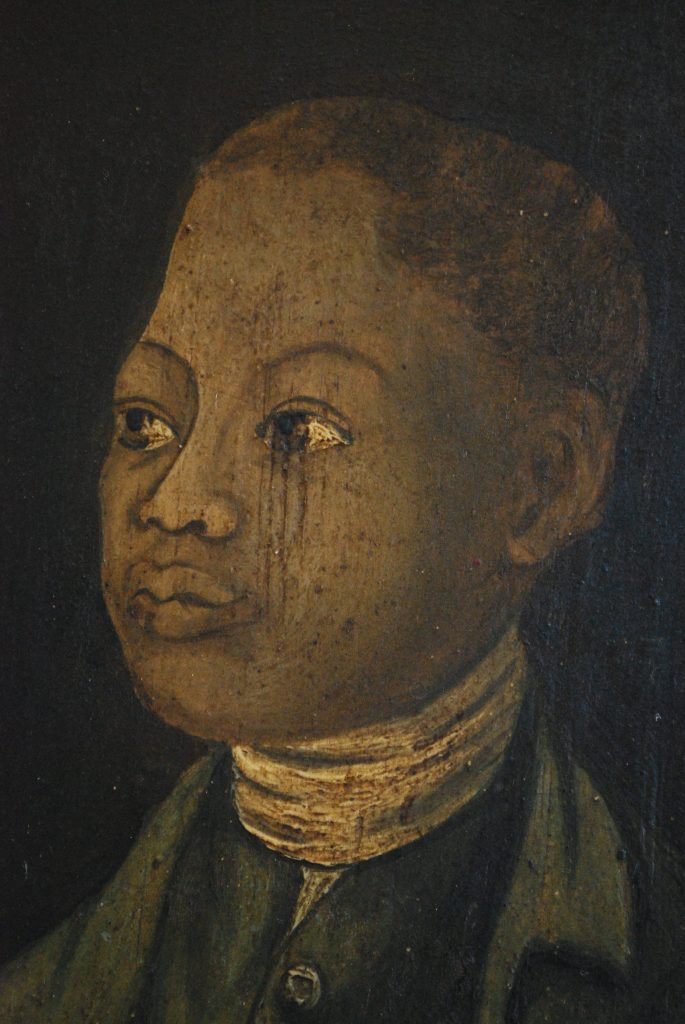
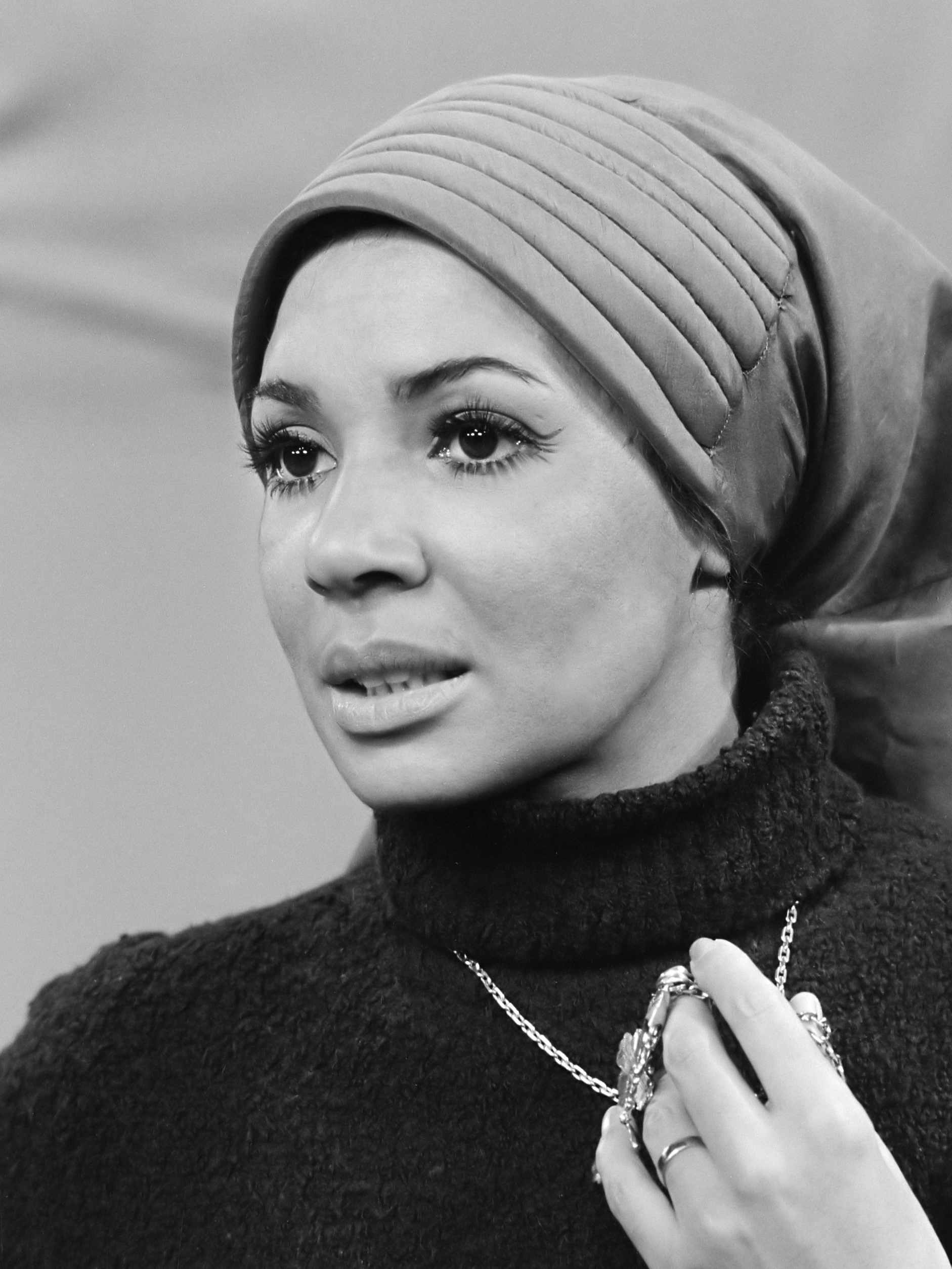
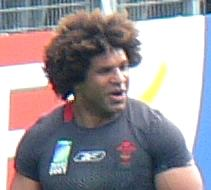
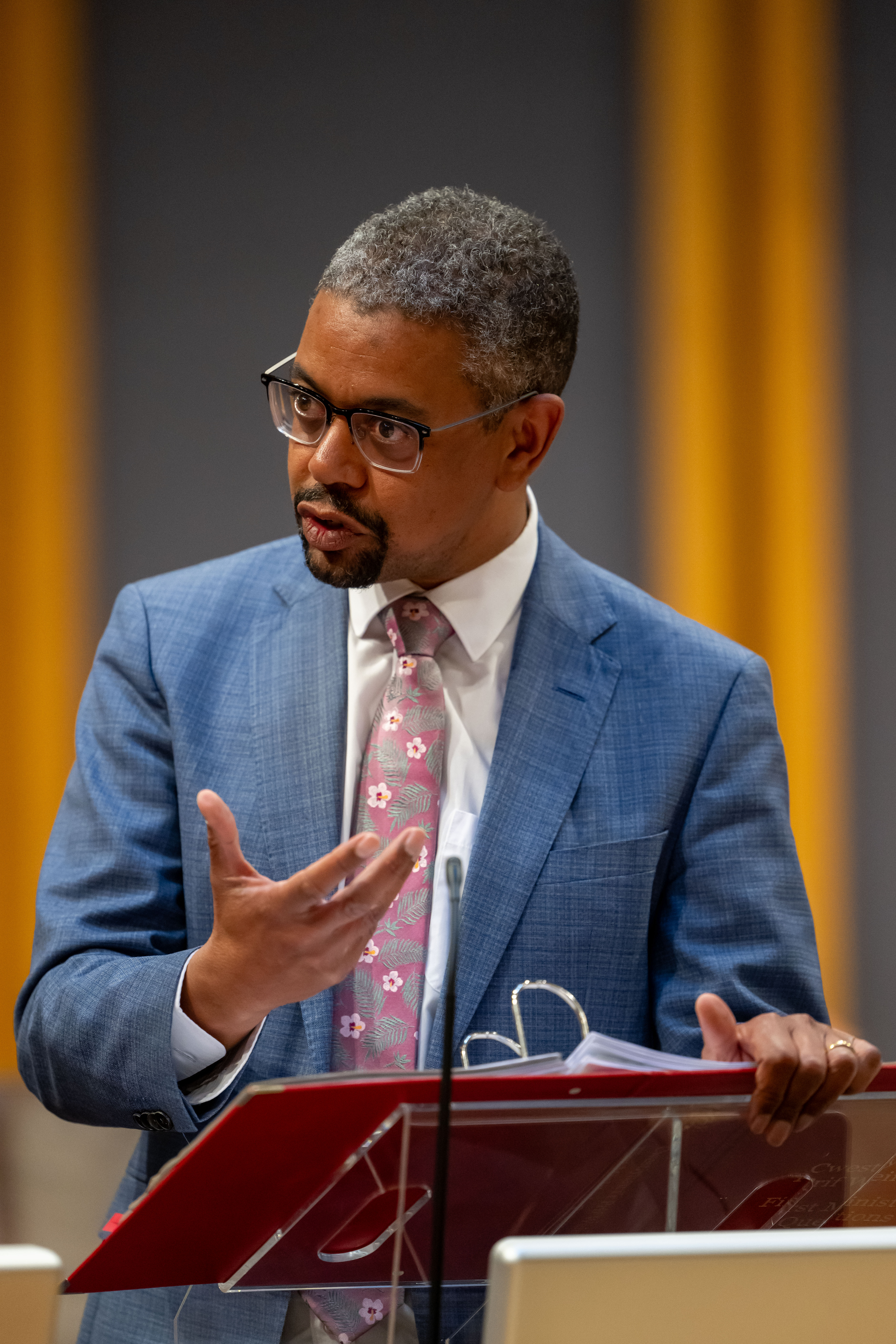
Clockwise from top left: John Ystumllyn, one of the first Black Welsh people to be recorded historically in the eighteenth century. Dame Shirley Bassey, the first Black Briton and the first Welsh person to have a UK Number one record in 1959. First Minister of Wales Vaughan Gething, the first black leader of any European country in 2024. Colin Charvis, the first black person to captain the Wales national rugby union team in 2002.

Black Welsh people (also known in Welsh as Cymry Duon) are the inhabitants of Wales who have an African or an Afro-Caribbean background and are black. Wales is home to one of the United Kingdom's oldest black communities, and Tiger Bay in Cardiff has housed a large Somali population since the development of the port in the 19th century. The 2011 census reported that there were more than 18,000 Welsh-African people in Wales (0.6% of the Welsh population).

The first recorded black person to live in North Wales, of whom historians have detailed knowledge, was John Ystumllyn (died 1786), a Gwynedd gardener whose origins are unrecorded.

== Demographics ==
Historical Population
Year	Pop.	±%
1991	9,492	—
2001	7,069	−25.5%
2011	18,276	+158.5%
2021	27,554	+50.8%
Source: Office for National Statistics

Black Welsh people by census data
Ethnic group	2021		2011		2001		1991	
Ethnic group	Number	%	Number	%	Number	%	Number	%
Black Welsh people	27,554	0.89%	18,276	0.60%	7,069	0.24%	9,492	0.33%
—Black African	19,907	0.64%	11,887	0.39%	3,727	0.13%	2,671	0.09%
—Black Caribbean	3,700	0.12%	3,809	0.12%	2,597	0.09%	3,348	0.12%
—Other Black	3,947	0.13%	2,580	0.08%	745	0.03%	3,473	0.12%
Wales	3,107,494	100%	3,063,456	100%	2,903,085	100%	2,835,073	100%

== Notable black Welsh people ==
=== Sports ===
==== Association football ====
- Ethan Ampadu
- George Berry
- Nathan Blake
- Ben Cabango
- Robert Earnshaw
- Danny Gabbidon
- Ryan Giggs
- Adam Henley
- Brennan Johnson
- Joel Lynch
- Rabbi Matondo
- Eddie Parris
- Jazz Richards
- Tyler Roberts
- Hal Robson-Kanu
- Sanchez Watt
- Sorba Thomas
- Ashley Williams

==== Athletics ====
- Jamie Baulch, sprint athlete
- Colin Jackson
- Christian Malcolm, track and field athlete
- Nigel Walker, former Welsh track and field athlete and Wales international rugby union player

==== Rugby League ====
- Billy Boston, represented Great Britain
- Regan Grace
- Clive Sullivan, the first black athlete to captain Great Britain in any sport

==== Rugby Union ====
- Aled Brew
- Nathan Brew
- Leon Brown
- Mark Brown, became the first known player of black origin to represent Wales in 1983.
- Colin Charvis, the first black captain of the Wales national rugby union team
- Rio Dyer
- Jason Forster
- Ashton Hewitt, Hewitt has also become known for speaking out against racial abuse.
- Martyn Madden
- Mackenzie Martin
- Richard Parks, former Wales international rugby union player turned extreme endurance athlete and television presenter
- Matthew Robinson
- Anthony Sullivan
- Ben Thomas
- Gavin Thomas
- Christ Tshiunza, became the first black & African born player to represent Wales in November 2021.
- Eli Walker
- Nigel Walker
- Glen Webbe, often stated to be the first black player to play for Wales, Webbe was the first black player to represent Wales at a World Cup, and is considered by many to be Wales' "first black icon".

==== Boxing ====
- Steve Robinson

=== Music ===
- Dame Shirley Bassey, singer
- Jason Camilleri (Dregz), rapper and former BBC presenter
- Kizzy Crawford, singer-songwriter and producer
- Eädyth, producer and singer-songwriter
- Patti Flynn, jazz singer and founder and patron of Black History Wales
- Aluna Francis, musician, former member of electronic music duo AlunaGeorge
- Eric Martin, musician and rapper also known as MC Eric
- Benji Webbe, musician, frontman of the alternative metal band Skindred
- Iris Williams, musician and member of the Gorsedd of Bards.

=== Film and television ===
- Josie d'Arby, TV presenter
- Rakie Ayola, actress
- Rungano Nyoni, film director and screenwriter
- Suzanne Packer, actress
- Jessica Sula, actress
- Tayce, RuPaul's Drag Race UK series 2 contestant
- Darragh Mortell, actor

=== Politics ===
- Betty Campbell, headteacher and city councillor
- Abdulrahim Abby Farah, diplomat
- Vaughan Gething, former First Minister of Wales in the Welsh Government, first black leader of a European nation
- Gaynor Legall former city councillor and activist

=== Others ===
- Selena Caemawr, autism activist, entrepreneur and poet
- Uzo Iwobi, equalities practitioner and former Commissioner for the Commission for Racial Equality
- Louise Watkins Kelton, United States Marshal

== See also ==
- Black British people
- Black Scottish people
- Black people in Ireland
