= History of rugby union matches between South Africa and Wales =

South Africa and Wales have competed against each other in rugby union since 1906. Of the 45 matches played to date, South Africa have won 37, with one match drawn and seven wins for Wales. Wales won their first away match against South Africa in 2022, to date their only win in the country. Since 2007, the winner has been awarded the Prince William Cup, which was created to celebrate 100 years of rugby between the two nations.

== Summary ==
=== Overview ===
Details	Played	Won by South Africa	Won by Wales	Drawn	South Africa points	Wales points
In South Africa	14	13	1	0	532	212
In Wales	26	20	5	1	621	385
Neutral venue	5	4	1	0	120	86
Overall	45	37	7	1	1,273	683

=== Records ===
Note: Date shown in brackets indicates when the record was or last set. Source:

Record	South Africa	Wales
Longest winning streak	16 (26 November 2000 – 29 November 2014)	4 (26 November 2016 – 27 October 2019)
Largest points for
Home	96 (27 June 1998)	36 (6 November 2004)
Away	73 (29 November 2025)	30 (21 June 2014)
Largest winning margin
Home	83 (27 June 1998)	14 (26 November 2016)
Away	73 (29 November 2025)	2 (2 June 2018)

== Results ==
No.	Date	Venue	Score	Winner	Competition
1	1 December 1906	St. Helen's, Swansea	0–11	South Africa	1906–07 South Africa tour of Great Britain, Ireland and France
2	14 December 1912	Cardiff Arms Park, Cardiff	0–3	South Africa	1912–13 South Africa tour of Great Britain, Ireland and France
3	5 December 1931	St. Helen's, Swansea	3–8	South Africa	1931–32 South Africa tour of Great Britain and Ireland
4	22 December 1951	Cardiff Arms Park, Cardiff	3–6	South Africa	1951–52 South Africa tour of Great Britain, Ireland and France
5	3 December 1960	National Stadium, Cardiff	0–3	South Africa	1960–61 South Africa tour of Great Britain, Ireland and France
6	23 May 1964	Kings Park Stadium, Durban	24–3	South Africa	1964 Wales tour of Kenya and South Africa
7	24 January 1970	National Stadium, Cardiff	6–6	draw	1969–70 South Africa tour of Great Britain and Ireland
8	26 November 1994	National Stadium, Cardiff	12–20	South Africa	1994 South Africa tour of Great Britain and Ireland
9	2 September 1995	Ellis Park Stadium, Johannesburg	40–11	South Africa	1995 Wales tour of South Africa
10	15 December 1996	National Stadium, Cardiff	20–37	South Africa	1996 South Africa tour of Argentina, France and Wales
11	27 June 1998	Loftus Versfeld Stadium, Pretoria	96–13	South Africa	1998 Wales tour of Zimbabwe and South Africa
12	14 November 1998	Wembley Stadium, London (England)	20–28	South Africa	1998 South Africa tour of Great Britain and Ireland
13	26 June 1999	Millennium Stadium, Cardiff	29–19	Wales	1999 South Africa tour of Wales
14	26 November 2000	Millennium Stadium, Cardiff	13–23	South Africa	2000 South Africa tour of Argentina, Great Britain and Ireland
15	8 June 2002	Free State Stadium, Bloemfontein	34–19	South Africa	2002 Wales tour of South Africa
16	15 June 2002	Newlands Stadium, Cape Town	19–8	South Africa	2002 Wales tour of South Africa
17	26 June 2004	Loftus Versfeld Stadium, Pretoria	53–18	South Africa	2004 Wales tour of Argentina and South Africa
18	6 November 2004	Millennium Stadium, Cardiff	36–38	South Africa	2004 Autumn International
19	19 November 2005	Millennium Stadium, Cardiff	16–33	South Africa	2005 Autumn International
20	24 November 2007	Millennium Stadium, Cardiff	12–34	South Africa	2007 Autumn International
21	7 June 2008	Free State Stadium, Bloemfontein	43–17	South Africa	2008 Wales tour of South Africa
22	14 June 2008	Loftus Versfeld Stadium, Pretoria	37–21	South Africa	2008 Wales tour of South Africa
23	8 November 2008	Millennium Stadium, Cardiff	15–20	South Africa	2008 Autumn International
24	5 June 2010	Millennium Stadium, Cardiff	31–34	South Africa	2010 Summer International
25	13 November 2010	Millennium Stadium, Cardiff	25–29	South Africa	2010 Autumn International
26	11 September 2011	Wellington Regional Stadium, Wellington (New Zealand)	17–16	South Africa	2011 Rugby World Cup
27	9 November 2013	Millennium Stadium, Cardiff	15–24	South Africa	2013 Autumn International
28	14 June 2014	Kings Park Stadium, Durban	38–16	South Africa	2014 Wales tour of South Africa
29	21 June 2014	Mbombela Stadium, Nelspruit	31–30	South Africa	2014 Wales tour of South Africa
30	29 November 2014	Millennium Stadium, Cardiff	12–6	Wales	2014 Autumn International
31	17 October 2015	Twickenham Stadium, London (England)	23–19	South Africa	2015 Rugby World Cup
32	26 November 2016	Millennium Stadium, Cardiff	27–13	Wales	2016 Autumn International
33	2 December 2017	Millennium Stadium, Cardiff	24–22	Wales	2017 Autumn International
34	2 June 2018	RFK Stadium, Washington, D.C. (United States)	20–22	Wales	2018 Summer International
35	24 November 2018	Millennium Stadium, Cardiff	20–11	Wales	2018 Autumn International
36	27 October 2019	International Stadium Yokohama, Yokohama (Japan)	16–19	South Africa	2019 Rugby World Cup
37	6 November 2021	Millennium Stadium, Cardiff	18–23	South Africa	2021 Autumn International
38	2 July 2022	Loftus Versfeld Stadium, Pretoria	32–29	South Africa	2022 Wales tour of South Africa
39	9 July 2022	Free State Stadium, Bloemfontein	12–13	Wales	2022 Wales tour of South Africa
40	16 July 2022	Cape Town Stadium, Cape Town	30–14	South Africa	2022 Wales tour of South Africa
41	19 August 2023	Millennium Stadium, Cardiff	16–52	South Africa	2023 Rugby World Cup warm-up match
42	22 June 2024	Twickenham Stadium, London	41–13	South Africa	2024 June test
43	23 November 2024	Millennium Stadium, Cardiff	12–45	South Africa	2024 Autumn International
44	29 November 2025	Millennium Stadium, Cardiff	0–73	South Africa	2025 end-of-year rugby union internationals
45	18 July 2026	Kings Park Stadium, Durban	43–0	South Africa	2026 Nations Championship

== List of series ==
Played	Won by South Africa	Won by Wales	Drawn
7	7	0	0

Year	South Africa	Wales	Series winner
1964	1	0	South Africa
1995	1	0	South Africa
1998	1	0	South Africa
2002	2	0	South Africa
2008	2	0	South Africa
2014	2	0	South Africa
2022	2	1	South Africa
