= Mark Brown (rugby union) =

Wales international rugby union player (born 1958)

- Born: 18 December 1958 (age 67) Newport, Wales

Rugby union career
- Position: Flanker
Amateur team(s)
Years	Team	Apps	(Points)
- Cwmbran RFC
–	Ebbw Vale RFC		
–	Pontypool RFC		
International career
Years	Team	Apps	(Points)
1983–1986	Wales	6	

Mark Brown (born 18 December 1958) is a Welsh former rugby union international player. He was the first Black Welsh person to represent the Wales national rugby union team.

== Early life ==
Brown was born in the Pillgwenlly area of Newport on 18 December 1958, to a Jamaican father and a mother from Yorkshire, England. Brown's family moved to Cwmbran at the age of six, where he attended Mount Pleasant and Coed Eva schools. Brown has stated that he was not from a rugby family, that his dad had no interest in the sport, being an avid cricket player and fan. As such, Brown did not pick up a rugby ball until he was seventeen.

== Career ==
At the age of seventeen Brown was invited to train with Cwmbran RFC (coached by former Ebbw Vale and Wales flanker Graham Jones). Brown only took the opportunity as a way to improve his fitness for the coming soccer season, but soon found himself playing matches for the club as a centre.

Brown's career as a flanker started at a Gwent Youth match, Brown was in attendance as a spectator but was soon asked to fill in at openside flanker, as the Gwent team was short of players. Despite having to borrow a pair of boots, and never playing the position before, Gwent Youth won the match and Brown was formally invited to join the squad as a flanker. The team would go on to win that year's Welsh Youth Cup.

Brown was then asked to play a single match for Jones' former club, Ebbw Vale away to Pontypool RFC. Despite losing heavily, Brown caught the eye of the Pontypool staff, and was soon invited to join them. By 1983, Brown had established himself as a first choice player in the Pontypool team. That year Pontypool won their first Schweppes Cup, with an 18-6 victory over Swansea RFC in the final. After a successful season, Brown was selected in the Welsh squad to play against Romania in Bucharest in November 1983; this ended in a 24-6 defeat for Wales, and he would not win another cap for two years. Brown was next called up for the 1986 Five Nations Championship, starting the first two games against England and Scotland, and played in all three tests of Wales' South Seas tour that summer.

== Wales' first black player ==
"People just treated me as part and parcel of the crowd or the team. My pride at having played for Wales is a pride in itself, not specifically to do with having been the first black man to do it."

— Mark Brown on being the first Black Welshman to play for Wales.

Brown's international selection is retrospectively notable as he is now considered the first black Welshman to represent Wales in its national sport (sometimes attributed to Glen Webbe). Despite this, Brown has stated that it was not something that was talked about at the time adding, "I didn’t even think about it. It didn’t even enter my head."
