= Jon Bryant (rugby union) =

Wales international rugby union player

Jonathan Bryant
- Born: Jonathan Bryant; 14 October 1976 (age 50) Aberdare, Wales
- Height: 5 ft 11 in (180 cm)
- Weight: 15 st 6 lb (216 lb; 98 kg)

Rugby union career
- Position: Centre
Senior career
Years	Team	Apps	(Points)
1999–2004	Pontypridd RFC	96	
2003–2004	Celtic Warriors		
2004–2005	Newport Gwent Dragons		
International career
Years	Team	Apps	(Points)
2003	Wales	1	(0)

Jonathan 'Jon' Bryant (born 14 October 1976, in Aberdare, Wales) is a former Wales Rugby union international. His previous clubs include Pontypridd RFC, Celtic Warriors, Newport Gwent Dragons and Sale Sharks. Formerly the player/manager of Merthyr RFC and head coach of Barry RFC.

Before becoming seriously involved in the world of rugby, Jonathan was a talented footballer who was scouted by many professional clubs before switching codes after an invite to play for his old school, Aberdare Boys Comprehensive, against a select XV. This game would include his future teammate, Dale McIntosh.

Such was his enthusiasm and drive in the game, he was offered a trial by the then Merthyr Tydfil RFC manager (He was also offered a bet by his uncle that if he "dump-tackled" McIntosh he would be financially rewarded and make a talking point in the game few would have anticipated). After two years at Merthyr, Bryant was offered a trial with Pontypridd along with Robert Sidoli, and he scored a try on his debut against Llanelli RFC.

He attained his only international cap as a replacement against Romania on 27 August 2003.
