= 2007 South Africa rugby union tour of Europe =

The 2007 South Africa rugby union tour of Europe were a series of rugby union matches played in November and December 2007 in Europe featuring the 2007 Rugby World Cup winners South Africa. Although the matches had been arranged well in advance of the World Cup, the mini-tour was seen as an opportunity for South Africa to showcase their talents and to say farewell to their outgoing coach, Jake White, who retired after the second game. In the event, several members of the World Cup squad were unavailable for either game, because of retirement (Os du Randt), injury (Percy Montgomery, Fourie du Preez, Bakkies Botha), club commitments (Butch James), or other reasons (Victor Matfield), and the captain, John Smit, who had just joined French club ASM Clermont Auvergne, was released to play only in the first match.

== Week 1 ==
The first match, and the only one with full Test status, was against Wales, on 24 November 2007, at the Millennium Stadium. Although Wales had more possession and dominated territorially, they managed to score just two tries, both from kicks. The first was scored by Welsh full-back Morgan Stoddart, who was making his Test debut. The second, the result of a bad mistake by Springbok full-back Ruan Pienaar, was scored by Colin Charvis; it was his 22nd Test try, a new record for a forward in Test rugby. South Africa made better use of their more limited possession, scoring five tries, including one by Ryan Kankowski, also a Test debutant, as the world cup winners won the match 34–12.

24 November 2007
14:45 GMT

Wales	12–34	South Africa
Try: Charvis 39' m Stoddart 53' c Con: Hook (1/2)	Report	Try: Smith 20' c Fourie (2) 28' m, 31' c Pietersen 44' c Kankowski 67' m Con: A. Pretorius (3/4); Pen: F. Steyn (1/1) 3'

Millennium Stadium, Cardiff
Attendance: 56,000
Referee: Chris White (England)

FB	15	Morgan Stoddart	(substituted off) 69'
RW	14	Mark Jones
OC	13	Sonny Parker
IC	12	Gavin Henson
LW	11	Tom Shanklin
FH	10	James Hook	(substituted off) 76'
SH	9	Dwayne Peel	(substituted off) 53'
N8	8	Jonathan Thomas
OF	7	Robin Sowden-Taylor
BF	6	Colin Charvis (c)	(substituted off) 61'
RL	5	Alun Wyn Jones
LL	4	Ian Evans	(substituted off) 53'
TP	3	Gethin Jenkins
HK	2	Huw Bennett	(substituted off) 53'
LP	1	Rhys M. Thomas	(substituted off) 69'
Replacements:
HK	16	T. Rhys Thomas	(substituted on) 53'
PR	17	Duncan Jones	(substituted on) 69'
LK	18	Luke Charteris	(substituted on) 53'
FL	19	Alix Popham	(substituted on) 61'
SH	20	Mike Phillips	(substituted on) 53'
FH	21	Ceri Sweeney	(substituted on) 76'
FB	22	Tom James	(substituted on) 69'
Coach:
(Wales) Nigel Davies

FB	15	Ruan Pienaar
RW	14	JP Pietersen		(substituted off) 75'
OC	13	Jaque Fourie
IC	12	François Steyn
LW	11	Bryan Habana
FH	10	André Pretorius		(substituted off) 59'
SH	9	Ricky Januarie		(substituted off) 78'
N8	8	Ryan Kankowski		(substituted off) 78'
OF	7	Juan Smith
BF	6	Schalk Burger
RL	5	Johann Muller
LL	4	Bakkies Botha		(substituted off) 40'
TP	3	CJ van der Linde		(substituted off) 75'
HK	2	John Smit (c)
LP	1	Jannie du Plessis		(substituted off) 64'
Replacements:
HK	16	Bismarck du Plessis	(yellow card) 77' to 80'	(substituted on) 75'
PR	17	Heinke van der Merwe		(substituted on) 64'
LK	18	Albert van den Berg	(yellow card) 48' to 58'	(substituted on) 40'
N8	19	Hilton Lobberts		(substituted on) 78'
CE	20	Wynand Olivier		(substituted on) 59'
WG	21	Akona Ndungane		(substituted on) 75'
FB	22	Conrad Jantjes		(substituted on) 78'
Coach:
(South Africa) Jake White

== Week 2 ==
The second match, at Twickenham on 1 December 2007, saw a Springbok XV facing a Barbarians side that included such big names as Jerry Collins, Martyn Williams, Matt Giteau, and the retiring Jason Robinson. The Barbarians' plans were disrupted when the English Premier clubs decided not to allow players to be released, and the Irish provinces followed suit. As a result, Brian O'Driscoll, who had been named to captain the side, had to withdraw, as did Andrew Sheridan of Sale Sharks, but Mark Regan of Bristol defied the ban and led the Barbarians, an act for which he was later sanctioned by his club. The match itself proved to be somewhat one-sided affair, the lacklustre Springboks, who included just five World Cup final starters, losing 22–5 to a Barbarians side that played with flair and creativity. The Barabarians scored three tries, the South Africans only one, scored by Barend Pieterse, who was making his first appearance in a Springbok jersey in place of Schalk Burger, who had broken his nose in the game against Wales.

1 December 2007
15:00 GMT

Barbarians	22–5	South Africa
Try: Giteau 18' m M. Williams 40' c Elsom 42' c Con: Giteau (2); Pen: Giteau 3'	Report	Try: Pieterse 34' m

Twickenham Stadium, London
Attendance: 58,186
Referee: Christophe Berdos (France)

FB	15	(England) Jason Robinson	(substituted off) 68'
RW	14	(New Zealand) Joe Rokocoko
OC	13	(New Zealand) Conrad Smith	(substituted off) 58'
IC	12	(New Zealand) Ma'a Nonu
LW	11	(Fiji) Isoa Neivua	(substituted off) 63'
FH	10	(Australia) Matt Giteau
SH	9	(New Zealand) Justin Marshall
N8	8	(New Zealand) Jerry Collins
OF	7	(Wales) Martyn Williams
BF	6	(Australia) Rocky Elsom
RL	5	(Wales) Brent Cockbain	(substituted off) 51'
LL	4	(Australia) Justin Harrison	(substituted off) 63'
TP	3	(Argentina) Federico Pucciariello
HK	2	(England) Mark Regan (c)	(substituted off) 51'
LP	1	(Australia) Salesi Ma'afu	(substituted off) 51'
Replacements:
HK	16	(South Africa) Schalk Brits	(substituted on) 51'
PR	17	(South Africa) JD Moller	(substituted on) 51'
LK	18	(New Zealand) Troy Flavell	(substituted on) 51'
FL	19	(Wales) Michael Owen	(substituted on) 63'
FH	20	(South Africa) Peter Grant	(substituted on) 68'
CE	21	(Wales) Tom Shanklin	(substituted on) 58'
WG	22	(England) Ben Cohen	(substituted on) 63'
Coach:
(Ireland) Eddie O'Sullivan

FB	15	Ruan Pienaar
RW	14	Akona Ndungane
OC	13	Jaque Fourie
IC	12	François Steyn
LW	11	Bryan Habana
FH	10	André Pretorius	(substituted off) 33'
SH	9	Ricky Januarie	(substituted off) 43'
N8	8	Ryan Kankowski
OF	7	Juan Smith
BF	6	Barend Pieterse	(substituted off) 66'
RL	5	Johann Muller (c)
LL	4	Johan Ackermann	(substituted off) 54'
TP	3	CJ van der Linde		(substituted off) 75'
HK	2	Bismarck du Plessis	(substituted off) 71'
LP	1	Jannie du Plessis	(substituted off) 43'	(substituted on) 75'
Replacements:
HK	16	Tiaan Liebenberg	(substituted on) 71'
PR	17	Heinke van der Merwe	(substituted on) 43'
LK	18	Albert van den Berg	(substituted on) 54'
N8	19	Hilton Lobberts	(substituted on) 66'
CE	20	Wynand Olivier	(substituted on) 33'
WG	21	Wayne Julies
FB	22	Conrad Jantjes	(substituted on) 43'
Coach:
(South Africa) Jake White
