= 1999 Canada rugby union tour of Great Britain =

Summary
P	W	D	L
Total
3	0	0	3
Test match
2	0	0	2
Opponent
P	W	D	L
Wales
1	0	0	1
England
1	0	0	1

The 1999 Canada rugby union tour of Great Britain was a series of matches played in August 1999 in Great Britain by Canada national rugby union team to prepare the 1999 Rugby World Cup.

== Results ==
'Scores and results list Canada's points tally first.

Opponent	For	Against	Date	Venue	Status
Pontypridd	6	20	17 August 1999	Pontypridd	Tour match
Wales	19	33	21 August 1999	Millennium, Cardiff	Test match
England	11	36	28 August 1999	Twickenham, London	Test match
