= Patrick Hannan (presenter) =

Welsh political journalist, author and television and radio presenter

Patrick Hannan

Patrick Hannan MBE (26 September 1941 – 11 October 2009) was a Welsh political journalist, author and television and radio presenter.

The son of an Irish doctor who migrated to Wales in the 1930s, he was born and raised in Aberaman, near Aberdare in South Wales. He was educated at Cowbridge Grammar School, where Anthony Hopkins was a fellow pupil; and at Aberystwyth University, where he first entered journalism writing for the college newspaper, The Courier.

He joined the graduate training scheme at Western Mail in the mid-1960s, becoming industrial editor, before joining BBC Wales in 1970. He became a presenter of the daily regional news programme Wales Today. For thirteen years he was the BBC's political correspondent in Wales, and had a weekly series on BBC Radio Wales. He broadcast regularly on BBC Radio 4, presenting the political and discussion programmes, Out of Order and Tea Junction.

He was well known as one half of the Welsh team in the popular Round Britain Quiz, and for the fifth time in ten years with his colleague Peter Stead had won the 2009 competition. He produced documentary programmes for BBC2, BBC Wales and HTV. He wrote four books, and edited two.

Awarded an MBE in 1994 for services to broadcasting, he was an honorary fellow of Cardiff University and Aberystwyth University.

He married Menna Richards, former director of BBC Wales, in 1985. He had two sons and a daughter from his first marriage. He died after a short illness.

== Publications ==
- Wales on the Wireless: A Broadcasting Anthology, (ed, 1988), Gomer Press in association with BBC, ISBN 0 86383 447 7
- The Welsh Illusion (1999)
- Wales Off Message (2000)
- 2001 A Year in Wales (2001)
- When Arthur Met Maggie (2006)
- A Useful Fiction: Adventures in British Democracy (2009)
