= Nigel Bezani =

Welsh rugby union player

Nigel Bezani, known as Baz was a rugby union player who played prop for Pontypridd RFC in the Welsh Premier League.

Baz joined Pontypridd from Tylorstown RFC in the 1988/89 season, and captained Pontypridd to the SWALEC Cup win of 1996.

Baz retired from playing in 1997, and in 1999 returned to Pontypridd as Team Manager.
