= Gavin Dacey =

Welsh rugby union player

- Born: Gavin Dacey Merthyr Tydfil, Wales

Rugby union career
Senior career
Years	Team	Apps	(Points)
2005–2016	Pontypridd RFC	257	(260)
2016	Merthyr RFC		

Gavin Dacey, born 19 October 1984 in Merthyr Tydfil, Wales, is a rugby union player for, and Vice Captain of Pontypridd RFC in the Principality Premiership.

Dacey attained his 100th appearance for Pontypridd RFC on 31 October 2009 in the Principality Premiership game against Cardiff RFC.

Dacey's position of choice is as a Centre.
