= Glen Webbe =

Wales international rugby union player

Glenn Webbe
- Born: Glenfield Michael Charles Webbe; 21 January 1962 (age 64) Cardiff, Wales
- Height: 5 ft 10 in (1.78 m)
- Weight: 76 kg (12 st 0 lb; 168 lb)

Rugby union career
- Position: Wing
Amateur team(s)
| Years | Team | Apps | (Points) |
- Canton RFC
| 1981–1995 | Bridgend RFC | 75 | (169) |
International career
| Years | Team | Apps | (Points) |
| 1980 | Wales Youth | | |
- Wales B
| 1986–1988 | Wales | 10 | (16) |

Glenfield Michael Charles Webbe (born 21 January 1962) is a Welsh former international rugby union player. He was the first Black Welshman to represent the Welsh national rugby union team, he has since been described as "Wales first black icon".

== Early life ==
Webbe was born in Cardiff, the only boy of eight children. His parents, Islyn (a nurse at St David's Hospital) and Mike (a steelworker) were part of the Windrush generation, travelling from St Kitts on the RMS Queen Mary and settling in Ely, Cardiff.

During a tour of South Africa with the Wales youth team during apartheid, Webbe and his team mates were refused service in a restaurant, being told that "we've got a policy, we don't serve black people in here". Recounting the incident for a BBC documentary in 2023, Webbe stated that once the Welsh team's coach realised what had happened he responded "if it's not good enough for Glenn then it's not good enough for us", before he "marched the whole party out of there and I'm still touched now."

Despite growing up in Ely, attended Glan Ely Comprehensive and winning recognition for his abilities in rugby, Welsh baseball and athletics, Webbe was advised by Cardiff RFC players that there were "cliques" in the Cardiff team, and that he may be better off elsewhere.

== Career ==
At the age of 18, Webbe accepted an offer to play top flight rugby with Bridgend RFC. Webbe would go on to play a total of fourteen seasons for the club, becoming a cult figure among both Bridgend supporters and Welsh rugby fans in general. Despite his early successes, Webbe would have to wait five years for his international call up, not being selected until the 1986 tour of the South Pacific and making his international debut on 12 June as a replacement against Tonga. Webbe made his home debut in the 1987 Five Nations Championship win against England and was subsequently picked for the inaugural World Cup in New Zealand that summer.

At the world cup, Webbe was given a rare start in Wales' second match against Tonga, being chosen on the right wing ahead of Ieuan Evans. Webbe took his opportunity, and scored two tries early in the match. However, he was knocked unconscious as a result of a high tackle by Tonga full-back Tali Eteʻaki. Wales had already used their two allocated substitutions and despite there being clear signs of a concussion, the decision was taken to allow Webbe to play on. Although evidently struggling with a head injury, Webbe seemed to play on instinct, and would even score a notable third try, sprinting ninety meters and beating a number of defenders to complete his hat trick of tries, in a 29-16 win for Wales.

After the match, Webbe's concussion was examined and Wales Manager Clive Rowlands decided to send Webbe home on safety grounds, meaning the player would miss Wales' third place finish. Webbe has since remarked that he has no memories of the match after the tackle, including his final try.

== "Wales' first black icon" ==
Webbe is often incorrectly stated to be the first black Welshman to play rugby union for Wales. However, Mark Brown was capped in 1983 and is considered to be the first Welsh player of black origin. Webbe's exploits at the 1987 World Cup made him a cult figure in Wales. This, together with his reputation as a stoical but humorous personality and his notable try scoring ability have seen Webbe described as "Wales' first black icon".

Webbe has spoken of his experiences as one of the first black players in Welsh rugby, commenting on racism in association football, Webbe said he believed rugby was "far more tolerant, (but) can't be complacent". An ongoing debate throughout Webbe's career was whether or not he was overlooked for international selection because of his ethnicity. Webbe has responded to this stating that although there is no way of determining if that was true, he did not believe it to be the case, adding that "David Bishop wasn't black, and he was overlooked far worse than I was".

Webbe has said that he witnessed "very little racism" during his rugby career, believing that some incidents which could be seen as racist were meant in good humour or were not "intentionally racist". Webbe has said he experienced "only one major incident of racism" in his career, during a match at local rivals Maesteg. Webbe heard monkey chanting coming from someone in the crowd, which was followed by a banana being thrown at his feet. Webbe's notable response was to calmly peel the banana and take a bite before throwing it back into the stand, an act which was greeted with clapping and cheering by the crowd.

== Other ==
In 1993, Webbe featured as a contender in the second series of the British television show Gladiators, but was eliminated in the first round.

Both Webbe and Gareth Thomas have spoken about Thomas' coming out to Webbe, before Thomas became one of the first professional athletes to do so publicly in 2009. Thomas has credited Webbe with being a "pioneer" and "a very special person", praising his attitude to sexuality. Webbe stated, "nothing changed to us, he was still the same old Alfie, a good lad."

== Bibliography ==
- Budd, Terry (2017). That Great Little Team On The Other Side of The Bridge:The 140 Year History of Canton RFC (Cardiff) Season 1876-77 to 2016-17. Penarth, Glamorgan: Beacon Printers.
- Davies, Sean (9 November 2006). "Tongan treble eludes Webbe". BBC Sport.
- Slot, Owen (25 September 1994). "Rugby Union Diary: Webbe still works wonders on the wing". The Independent. Independent Digital News & Media.
- "Webbe Recalls Historic World Cup Treble". Welsh Rugby Union. 29 May 2019.
