= David Bryant (rugby union) =

- Full name: David John Bryant
- Born: 21 February 1967 (age 59) Bridgend, Wales

Rugby union career
- Position: Flanker
International career
Years	Team	Apps	(Points)
1988–89	Wales	8	(0)

David John Bryant (born 21 February 1967) is a Welsh former rugby union international.

Born in Bridgend, Bryant attended Bryntirion Comprehensive School and played for Bridgend RFC. He read economics at Swansea University and was a varsity rugby player, captaining Wales at the Students World Cup.

While a 21-year old South Glamorgan Institute student, Bryant was first capped for Wales on the 1988 tour of New Zealand. Featuring as a flanker in both Tests, which were heavy defeats, he returned home with lasting head scars, having received 28 stitches over the course of the tour. He played two further Tests at home that year, against Western Samoa and Romania, then all matches in the 1989 Five Nations, to finish with eight Wales caps.

Bryant captained Bridgend in the 1990s.

== See also ==
- List of Wales national rugby union players
