= Kevin Moseley =

- Born: 2 July 1963 (age 63) Caerphilly, Wales
- Height: 1.98 m (6 ft 6 in)
- Weight: 121 kg (19 st 1 lb; 267 lb)

Rugby union career
- Position: Lock
Senior career
Years	Team	Apps	(Points)
1983–1990	Pontypool	24	(0)
1990–1996	Newport	86	(14)
1996–1997	West Hartlepool	?	(?)
1997-?	Penzance & Newlyn	?	(?)
International career
Years	Team	Apps	(Points)
1988–1991	Wales	9	(0)
Coaching career
- Years: Team
- ?: Penzance & Newlyn/Cornish Pirates

Kevin Moseley (born 2 July 1963 in Caerphilly, Wales) is a former Wales international rugby union player. His playing position was as a lock forward. Moseley made eleven appearances for Wales.

Moseley joined Pontypool RFC in 1983, spending nine seasons at the club including two as club captain. He made his debut for Wales during the 1988 tour of New Zealand. At the time, rugby was an amateur game, and Moseley was not given time off by his employer to travel, resulting in his resignation in order to go on the tour.

His Five Nations début came in 1989, against Scotland at Murrayfield. The following year, during Wales' opening match of the 1990 Five Nations against France, Moseley was sent off for stamping on French wing Marc Andrieu.

Moseley was handed a 32-week ban for the offence, which at the time was the longest ban ever issued.

Moseley moved from Pontypool to Newport RFC for the 1990/91 season, making his début on December 29 against Neath RFC. He briefly resumed his Wales career, making four appearances during the 1991 Rugby World Cup.

He made 86 appearances for Newport before departing after the 1995/96 season. He spent the 1996/97 season at West Hartlepool RFC. Following this Moseley moved into a player-coach role at Penzance & Newlyn RFC, and later into his nine seasons with the club, a coaching-only role. Outside of rugby, Moseley took up a position as a sports teacher at Bodmin College in Cornwall.
