= Peter Stead (writer) =

Welsh writer, broadcaster and historian (1943–2026)

Peter Stead FLSW (22 August 1943 – 23 March 2026) was a Welsh writer, broadcaster and historian.

== Life and career ==
Stead was born in Barry, Wales on 22 August 1943. He attended grammar schools at Barry and Gowerton. Stead studied history at Swansea University under Prof Glanmor Williams, and was subsequently a visiting Fulbright scholar at Wellesley College, and at the University of North Carolina.

He was Chairman of the Dylan Thomas Literary Prize, and along with the late Patrick Hannan, Stead was a member of the Welsh team in the radio series Round Britain Quiz for several years. In 2013, Stead was elected a Fellow of the Learned Society of Wales.

Stead died on 23 March 2026, aged 82.

== Works ==
- Coleg Harlech The first fifty years. Cardiff: University of Wales Press. 1977. ISBN 0708306578.
- Ivor Allchurch (Christopher Davies, 1998)
- Film and the Working Class (1989)
- Richard Burton: So Much, So Little (1991)
- Dennis Potter (1995)
- Acting Wales: Stars of Stage and Screen (2002)
