= Richard Donovan (rugby union) =

- Full name: Richard Evan Donovan
- Born: 20 January 1963 (age 63) Llanharan, Wales

Rugby union career
- Position: Centre
International career
Years	Team	Apps	(Points)
1983	Wales	1	(0)

Richard Evan Donovan (born 20 January 1963) is a Welsh former rugby union international.

Born in Llanharan, Donovan attended Pencoed Comprehensive School.

Donovan earned his only Wales cap against France at the Parc des Princes in the 1983 Five Nations, when he came off the bench to replace fullback Mark Wyatt, who had broken his collarbone. This made Donovan the first South Wales Police player to be capped for Wales in a full international. He also played rugby for Cardiff and Swansea.

== See also ==
- List of Wales national rugby union players
