= Chris Dicomidis =

Cyprus international rugby union footballer

- Born: Christopher David Dicomidis; 14 September 1985 (age 41) Pencoed, Wales
- Height: 6 ft 6 in (1.98 m)
- Weight: 110 kg (17 st 5 lb; 240 lb)

Rugby union career
- Position(s): Lock, Flanker
Amateur team(s)
| Years | Team | Apps | (Points) |
| 2004 | Tondu | | |
Senior career
| Years | Team | Apps | (Points) |
| 2009- | Pontypridd RFC | 400 | (255) |
| 2004- | Cardiff Blues | | |
International career
| Years | Team | Apps | (Points) |
- Wales U19
| 2006 | Wales U21 | 3 | (96) |
| – | Cyprus | | |
Coaching career
- Years: Team
- –: Ccyd

Christopher David Dicomidis (born 14 September 1985) is a former rugby union player for Pontypridd RFC in the Principality Premiership, and for the Cyprus national team.He is currently Team Manager for Cardiff Rugby

== Early life and education ==
Born in Pencoed, Dicomidis progressed through the junior teams of Pencoed RFC, before joining the junior side of Cardiff RFC – Cardiff Junior Blue & Blacks before it disbanded at Under 15's level and moved to Old Penarthians RFC. He then joined Tondu RFC as a fullback.

Dicomidis and was capped by Wales at FIRA under 19 level, as a Lock, and also figured in the Celtic Warriors academy.

Studying sports and leisure management at UWIC, Dicomidis represented the university team in the first division during the 2004–05 season, making a number of appearances on permit for Pontypridd RFC in the league and cup. Further international honours followed with Wales Universities.

== Career ==
At the beginning of the 2005–06 season, Dicomidis was drafted into the Pontypridd senior squad. A good run of form was rewarded with a call up to the Wales under 21 squad, for whom he won caps during the Six Nations campaign and the age group World Cup tournament in France.

Dicomidis was voted joint recipient of the "Most Improved Player of the Year" award for 2006 by the Pontypridd Supporters' Club.

Dicomidis, who plays at Lock, Flanker or Number 8 was handed the captaincy of the Pontypridd team at the beginning of the 2010/11 season and captained the club to win the Welsh cup in 2010-2011 (the season Pontypridd also finished as runaway league winners but lost out in the play off final to Llanelli RFC), the league in 2011-2012 (also leading the team to the final of the Swalec cup competition) and to the club's first league and cup double in 2012–13. Dicomidis was also a member of the squad that successfully achieved the double-double by winning the cup and league double for a second season in a row in 2013–14.

On 27 November 2013 Cardiff Blues announced the signing of Dicomidis on a long-term deal. Dicomidis said "I'm excited about the opportunity to become part of the Blues squad and taking my chance at professional rugby".

On Saturday 27 January 2024, Dicomidis made his 400th appearance for Ponty in a 29–26 win over Pontypool.
