= Morgan Stoddart =

Wales international rugby union footballer

- Born: Morgan Lloyd Stoddart; 23 September 1984 (age 42) Trealaw, Rhondda Cynon Taf, Wales
- Height: 1.86 m (6 ft 1 in)
- Weight: 93 kg (14 st 9 lb)
- Notable relative: Hywel Stoddart

Rugby union career
- Position(s): Fullback, Wing
Senior career
Years	Team	Apps	(Points)
2003–2004	Treorchy RFC	?	
2004–2006	Pontypridd RFC	40	
2006–2010	Llanelli RFC	12	(50)
2006–2012	Scarlets	85	(130)
- Correct as of 16 November 2022
International career
Years	Team	Apps	(Points)
2007–2011	Wales	8	(25)
- Correct as of 17:44, 7 January 2013 (UTC)
Coaching career
- Years: Team
- 2013–: Cross Keys RFC
- 2021–: Poland (attack coach)
- Correct as of 8 November 2022

Morgan Lloyd Stoddart (born 23 September 1984) is a former Wales international rugby union player. His usual position was fullback or wing.

In January 2013, Stoddart retired from rugby due to injury.

== Club career ==
=== Treorchy RFC ===
Stoddart began his rugby career at Treorchy RFC, working his way through the club's youth ranks before finally making it into the senior team for the 2003–04 season while still only 18 years old. Stoddart made most of his appearances at fly-half that season, scoring over 250 points for the Rhondda club. However, Treorchy were relegated from the First Division and Stoddart was given a trial at Pontypridd RFC.

=== Pontypridd RFC ===
Unlike the previous season, Pontypridd deployed Stoddart at fullback for most of his appearances in the 2004–05 season, and gradually earned a reputation as one of the most attacking prospects in the Premiership. The following year, Stoddart made the number 15 shirt at Sardis Road his own, and his explosive breaks were said to have provided the catalyst for Ponty's 2006 Konica Minolta Cup triumph over Neath.

=== Scarlets ===
Stoddart's performances did not go unnoticed by the Welsh regional sides, and he eventually signed a professional contract with the Llanelli Scarlets in 2006. Throughout the 2006–07 season, Stoddart played as understudy to Wales international Barry Davies, playing most of his matches for Llanelli RFC, but he eventually made his breakthrough to the regional side in the latter half of the season, making nine appearances, including two in the Heineken Cup.

He also scored two tries, including a 25-yard effort against Ulster in the Heineken Cup. Stoddart's efforts were rewarded when he won the Principality Premiership Player of the Year award for his contribution during the 2006–07 season for Llanelli.

During the 2007–08 season, Stoddart was given the chance to play at fullback regularly, following the departure of Barry Davies to Brive. Stoddart put in excellent performances which would lead to an international call up to the Welsh national team.

Stoddart made his return from injury on 5 October 2012, scoring a try in the match against the Newport Gwent Dragons. Despite his rehabilitation and return, Stoddart continued to experience pain from his knee injury, and ultimately retired in January 2013.

== International career ==
On 14 November 2007, Stoddart was given his first call-up to the Wales national rugby union team, for the Prince William Cup match against South Africa, and on 20 November, it was announced that he would be given the number 15 shirt as Wales' starting fullback. Although Wales lost 34–12, Stoddart shone on his debut, setting up Wales' first try and scoring the second. In January 2011, he was recalled to the Wales squad for the 2011 Six Nations Championship, a tournament in which he scored two tries in three appearances, one in the opener against England and the other against Italy.

On 6 August 2011 during a World Cup warm up match between Wales and England, Stoddart broke his left leg after being tackled by Delon Armitage. The incident was so graphic that match broadcaster Sky Sports chose not to show a replay. The injury ended any hopes Stoddart had of playing in that year's World Cup in New Zealand.

=== International tries ===
Try	Opponent	Location	Venue	Competition	Date	Result
1	South Africa	Cardiff, Wales	Millennium Stadium	2007 South Africa rugby union tour of Europe	24 November 2007	Loss
2	Canada	Cardiff, Wales	Millennium Stadium	2008 Autumn Internationals	14 November 2008	Win
3	England	Cardiff, Wales	Millennium Stadium	2011 Six Nations	4 March 2011	Loss
4	Italy	Rome, Italy	Stadio Flaminio	2011 Six Nations	26 February 2011	Win
5	Barbarian F.C.	Cardiff, Wales	Millennium Stadium	2011 June rugby union tests	4 June 2011	Loss

== Coaching career ==
Stoddart was named head coach of Cross Keys RFC ahead of the 2013–2014 season.

In 2021, he joined Poland national rugby union team as attack and backs coach.

== Personal life ==
Stoddart is a supporter of Aston Villa.

His brother Hywel Stoddart is also a professional rugby union player.
