= John Pettingall =

Rev. John Pettingall D.D. (1707/8 – 30 June 1781) was a Welsh Church of England clergyman and antiquarian.

== Life ==
Pettingall was born in Newport, Monmouthshire, Wales He attended Cowbridge School and there even learnt some Hebrew before matriculating from Jesus College, Oxford in 1725. He obtained his B.A. degree in 1728 and moved to Corpus Christi College, Cambridge, receiving his M.A. degree from there in 1740. He was later awarded the Lambeth degree of D.D. He was ordained at Llandaff Cathedral in 1732 and, after serving as chaplain to the Bishop of Llandaff, he was rector of Whitson and vicar of Christchurch, both near Newport, Wales. He held these positions until 1756. Thereafter he was appointed rector of Stoke Hammond, Buckinghamshire, a position that he held until his death in Stoke Hammond in 1781.

He was elected a fellow of the Society of Antiquaries in 1752. Topics covered by his works included Roman artifacts, early British coins and the jury in Greek and Roman society.
