= Edward Treharne =

Wales international rugby union footballer

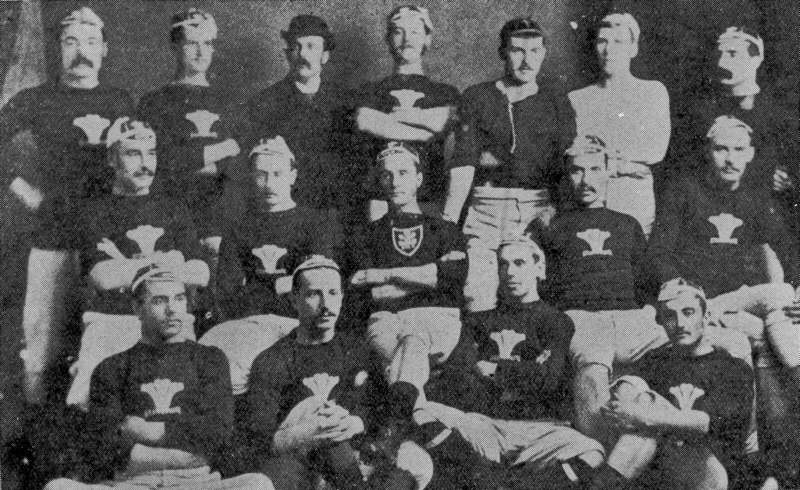
- Treharne stood in back row, second from right, with the first Wales international team, 1881.
- Born: Edward Llewellyn Treharne; 22 March 1862 Ystradyfodwg, Wales
- Died: 29 December 1904 (aged 42) Barry, Wales
- School: Cowbridge Grammar School
- University: St Bartholomew's Hospital Medical College

Rugby union career
- Position(s): Forward, Half back
Amateur team(s)
Years	Team	Apps	(Points)
- Cowbridge Grammar School
–	Pontypridd RFC		
–	Cardiff RFC		
–	St. Barts		
International career
Years	Team	Apps	(Points)
1881–1882	Wales	2	(0)

Edward Llewellyn Treharne (22 March 1862 – 29 December 1904) was a Welsh rugby union forward who played club rugby for Pontypridd and Cardiff, and international rugby for Wales. He was a member of the first Wales international team that played England in 1881. At the time of the game he was still a student at Cowbridge, and later became a medical student at St Bartholomew's Hospital.

== Personal history ==
Treharne was born in Glamorganshire, Wales in 1862. In John M. Jenkins' 1991 book Who's Who of Welsh International Rugby Players his place of birth is stated as Merthyr Tydfil, a fact reiterated by the 1862 birth register. On rugby website Scrum.com, his birthplace is given as Ystradyfodwg, the old parish which once contained what is now the Rhondda. Both facts may be correct as the Merthyr Tydfil registration district during Victorian times contained the parish of Ystradyfodwg. His father, David Treharne, was a land agent in Merthyr. Due to the boom in coal prospecting, David Treharne became wealthy, and later moved to the Rhondda where he built a house in Pentre, called Pentre House. Edward Treharne was the third child of six, his elder siblings all boys, his younger siblings all girls. Research shows he was the 3rd of six children, two elder brothers, one younger on and two younger sisters.

Treharne was educated at Cowbridge Grammar School he later studied medicine at St Bartholomew's Hospital Medical College. He became a Doctor of Medicine, and was prominent in local politics. He was the president of Cadoxton Junior Conservative Club, was a member of both the Barry Lodge of Freemasons and Barry District Council. He was married to Margaret Louise (Crooke), and they had at least two children. In fact, when he married Margaret Louise in 1899, he was a widower and both his sons were from his first wife, Lydia Elizabeth Billings. His youngest son, Leslie Llewellyn Treharne died of wounds in France, during the First World War on 24 September 1915.

Treharne died at home in Barry in the Vale of Glamorgan in 1904 at the age of 42. The cause of death was recorded as a heart attack; Treharne had been told eighteen months prior that he was suffering from an enlargement of the heart, and that he was not to over exert himself.

== Rugby career ==
When Richard Mullock formed the first Welsh rugby union team in 1881, Treharne was one of the youngest members contacted to join the side. At the time he was living in Pontypridd, and is reported to have played for the club from 1880; but Treharne was still studying for Cowbridge Grammar School when the Welsh game took place. The match against England was a one-sided affair, with Wales losing by a massive seven goals, a drop goal and six tries to nil. One reason put forward to the difference in quality between the sides was that several members of the Welsh team were put into unfamiliar positions. Treharne himself, normally a full-back, was placed into the pack, though his speed did make him the most prominent of the Welsh forwards.

When Treharne was reselected for Wales as part of the 1883 Home Nations Championship he was playing for Pontypridd. Under the captaincy of Charles Lewis, Treharne faced England for a second time. Wales lost the match, but not as heavily as their first meeting, and the selectors only dropped two players for the next game; Cardiff's James Clare and Treharne.

=== International matches played ===
Wales

- England 1881, 1882

== Bibliography ==
- Godwin, Terry (1984). The International Rugby Championship 1883–1983. London: Willows Books. ISBN 0-00-218060-X.
- Griffiths, John (1987). The Phoenix Book of International Rugby Records. London: Phoenix House. ISBN 0-460-07003-7.
- Harris, Gareth; Evans, Alan (1997). Pontypridd RFC, The Early Years. Rugby Unlimited. ISBN 0-9531714-0-X.
- Jenkins, John M.; et al. (1991). Who's Who of Welsh International Rugby Players. Wrexham: Bridge Books. ISBN 1-872424-10-4.
- Smith, David; Williams, Gareth (1980). Fields of Praise: The Official History of The Welsh Rugby Union. Cardiff: University of Wales Press. ISBN 0-7083-0766-3.
