= Hywel Stoddart =

- Born: Hywel Stoddart; 1 April 1986 (age 40) Pontypridd, Wales
- Height: 191 cm (6 ft 3 in)
- Weight: 105 kg (16 st 7 lb)

Rugby union career
Senior career
Years	Team	Apps	(Points)
2011–2013	NG Dragons	2	(0)
- Correct as of 14:01, 16 March 2012 (UTC)

Hywel Stoddart (born 1 April 1986) is a Welsh rugby union player. He is the brother of former Wales international rugby union player Morgan Stoddart. A flanker, Hywel Stoddart Llandovery, Tonmawr and Newport RFC. He made his debut for the Welsh regional team Newport Gwent Dragons 15 March 2012 versus Cardiff Blues as a second-half replacement. He was released by Newport Gwent Dragons at the end of the 2012–13 season.
