= Justin Burnell =

- Born: Justin Burnell; 29 May 1967 (age 59) Wales

Rugby union career
- Position(s): Flanker, Head Coach
- Current team: Pontypridd RFC
Senior career
| Years | Team | Apps | (Points) |
- Cardiff
| – | Pontypridd | | |
| – | Bridgend | | |
| – | Neath | | |
International career
| Years | Team | Apps | (Points) |
- Wales A
Coaching career
- Years: Team
- Pontypridd RFC
- –: Cardiff RFC
- –: Wales U21s
- –: Wales U19s
- –: Cardiff Blues
- –: London Welsh
- –: Pontypridd RFC
- Correct as of 8 July 2011

Justin Burnell (born 29 May 1967) is a Welsh former rugby footballer and now a rugby union coach.

During his playing career as a back row forward Burnell played for Cardiff RFC, Pontypridd RFC and Neath RFC. He also gained Wales A Honours.

Burnell was Academy Director at Welsh regional side Cardiff Blues and head coach at Cardiff RFC. He was also the head coach of Wales U19, which won the Grand Slam in 2006. In the same season he coached them to the quarter finals of the FIRA World Cup. Burnell remained the head coach of the U19s the following year when they reached the semi-final of the FIRA World Cup in Belfast.

He was appointed Forwards Coach of Cardiff Blues in 2008, assisting Dai Young in leading them to a Heineken Cup Semi-Final in 2009, winning the EDF in 2009 and winning the Amlin Challenge Cup in 2010. In July 2011 Burnell and Gareth Baber were appointed head coaches of the Cardiff Blues following the resignation of Dai Young, guiding them to the quarter finals of the Heineken Cup – the only Welsh Region to reach the knockout stages that season.

In June 2013, Burnell took up the position of head coach for London Welsh. He guided them to promotion after Bristol RFC over two legs, winning 27–8 in the first game at the Kassam Stadium and then beating them again, 20–21, in the second game at the Memorial Stadium, securing promotion to the Aviva Premiership.

During the 2014/15 season, it was claimed that London Welsh were underfunded by up to £2 million, in comparison to other Premiership teams, and thereby were not given a level playing field, ergo making it difficult for them to compete in a competition. In March 2015, Burnell parted company with the Exiles.

Burnell is now head coach of WRU Premiership side Pontypridd RFC.
