= Jonathan Mason (rugby union) =

Wales international rugby union player

- Full name: Jonathan Edward Mason
- Born: 13 June 1965 (age 61) Aberdare, Wales

Rugby union career
- Position: Fullback
International career
Years	Team	Apps	(Points)
1988	Wales	1	(0)

Jonathan Edward Mason (born 13 June 1965) is a Welsh former rugby union international.

Mason, born in Aberdare, grew up playing in the Cynon Valley was a product of Mountain Ash RFC. A fullback, he appeared in 216 senior games for Pontypridd RFC and was a prolific goal kicker for the club, starting from his debut season in 1986 in which he scored 233 points. He returned to Mountain Ash in 1993.

It was from Pontypridd that Mason came into the Wales team in 1988, called up from holiday in Corfu as a replacement player for the tour of New Zealand. Despite injuring his shoulder in the tour match against North Auckland, Mason recovered in time to be named on the bench for the second Test in Auckland, where he came on as a substitute to earn his first cap. He helped set up Wales' only try of the match, scored by captain Jonathan Davies.

== See also ==
- List of Wales national rugby union players
