= Alex Finlayson (rugby union) =

- Full name: Alexander Alfred James Finlayson
- Born: 18 March 1948 (age 78) Cardiff, Wales

Rugby union career
- Position: Centre
International career
Years	Team	Apps	(Points)
1974	Wales	3	(0)

Alexander Alfred James Finlayson (born 18 March 1948) is a Welsh former rugby union international.

Born and raised in Cardiff, Finlayson was capped three times for Wales in the 1974 Five Nations. He replaced Keith Hughes in the side and played in his usual position of centre, for matches against Ireland, France and England.

Finlayson, a policeman, competed for South Wales Police RFC and had a long playing career with Cardiff RFC.

== See also ==
- List of Wales national rugby union players
