= Mark Bennett (rugby union, born 1969) =

- Born: Anthony Mark Bennett; 26 January 1968 (age 58) Neath, Wales
- Height: 6 ft 2 in (1.88 m)
- Weight: 97 kg (15 st 4 lb)
- School: Llangatwg Comprehensive School

Rugby union career
- Position: Flanker
Senior career
Years	Team	Apps	(Points)
1989-1990	Swansea RFC	5	(4)
1990-1997	Cardiff RFC	114	(74)
1997-1998	Neath RFC	12	(5)
1998-1999	Bristol RFC	29	
International career
Years	Team	Apps	(Points)
1995	Wales	3	(5)

Anthony Mark Bennett (born 26 January 1969) is a Welsh International rugby union player. He made three appearances for his country, as well as representing Swansea RFC, Cardiff RFC and Neath RFC in the top division of Welsh club rugby, and Bristol RFC in English club rugby. Following his retirement from playing, Bennett became a strength and conditioning coach, holding the position of conditioning coach for the Welsh national team for four years.

== Rugby career ==
Bennett made five appearances for Swansea RFC during the 1989/90 season. He moved to Cardiff RFC for the 1990/91 season, where he spend the majority of his playing career. It was while at Cardiff that Bennett made all three of his appearances for the Wales national team. His début came at the 1995 Rugby World Cup in South Africa, against New Zealand. He made one appearance in Wales' 1995 tour of South Africa, during which he scored a try, and his only victory for Wales came in his final game and only home appearance, against Fiji during their tour of Wales and Ireland.

In October 1997, he moved to Neath RFC where he remained for the remainder of the 1997/98 season. He joined English club Bristol RFC for the 1998/99 season, and was made club captain. Bristol has been relegated to the second tier of English rugby the previous season, but finished top of the division to win promotion back to the Premiership.

Bennett retired from playing in 1999, and moved to a position with Bristol as a strength & conditioning coach. Following a spell working with Llanelli Scarlets and the Celtic Warriors regional teams, Bennett joined the Wales national team coaching setup in 2004. During his time in the position, Wales won two Six Nations Grand Slams in 2005 and 2008. He left his position with the national team in 2009 to take up a position as the conditioning coach for the Ospreys regional team. Bennett returned to Bristol Rugby for the 2014/15 season as Head of Performance.
