= Wayne O'Connor =

Welsh rugby union player

Wayne John O'Connor, also known as Smurf (born 11 November 1978 (age 46) in Rumney, Wales), is a rugby union player for Pontypridd RFC in the Principality Premiership.

O'Connor progressed through the junior and youth teams of his local Rumney club, and was capped by Wales at under 16 level, as a prop.

Adapting to the role of openside flanker, O'Connor joined the Rumney senior team in 1998, playing in the First Division of the Welsh league.

An impressive run of displays as a grafting back rower earned O'Connor a call to join Pontypridd for the 2002 season, and was a consistent presence in the club's European campaigns.

Taking a year's sabbatical in 2007, O'Connor went walkabout in Australia and New Zealand, returning to Pontypridd at the commencement of the 2008–09 season

O'Connor was voted Principality Premiership Player of the Month in March 2009.
