= Gary Jones (rugby union) =

Wales international rugby union player

- Born: 17 July 1960 (age 66) Porth, Wales

Rugby union career
- Position: Flanker / No. 8
International career
Years	Team	Apps	(Points)
1988–90	Wales	5	(0)

Gary Jones (born 17 July 1960) is a Welsh former rugby union international.

A native of Porth, Jones was a Ystrad Rhondda RFC product who played as a back-rower. He captained Pontypridd during his time at the club in the early 1980s and it was there that he acquired his nickname "Boomer". After leaving Pontypridd in 1985, he joined Llanelli, where he would appear in over 200 games and play in four Welsh Cup wins.

Capped five times for Wales, Jones was a replacement for the 1988 tour of New Zealand and debuted in the 2nd Test in Auckland. He featured twice in the 1989 Five Nations, including Wales' win over England. His fourth cap was against the touring All Blacks later that year and he made his final appearance versus France in the 1990 Five Nations.

Jones, a father to two sons, is an aircraft engineer by profession.

== See also ==
- List of Wales national rugby union players
