= Aled Williams (rugby union) =

Welsh former rugby player (born 1964)

- Born: Aled Williams; 26 January 1964 (age 62) Cardigan, Wales
- Height: 5 ft 5 in (1.65 m)
- Weight: 71 kg (11 st 3 lb)
- University: Llandovery College

Rugby union career
- Position: Fly-half
Senior career
Years	Team	Apps	(Points)
1983-1998	Swansea RFC	221	(1509)
–	Bridgend RFC		
International career
Years	Team	Apps	(Points)
1990-1995	Wales	2	(0)

Aled Williams (born 26 January 1964) is a Welsh former international rugby union player who made two appearances for the Wales national team, both as a replacement. He played in the top division of Welsh club rugby for Swansea RFC and Bridgend RFC between 1983 and 1997.

Williams made his début for Swansea RFC in 1983 and played three full seasons for the club before moving to Bridgend RFC. Bridgend won the Snelling Sevens tournament in 1987, with Williams the recipient of the Bill Everson Award for the Man of the Tournament.

Williams returned to Swansea for the 1991/92 season. During his second stint, the club won the Welsh Premier Division title in the 1991/92 and 1993/94 season and won the SWALEC Cup in 1994, having finished as runner up in 1992. Williams also played in the club's victory over Australia during their tour match in 1992. Williams played 221 games for the Whites scoring 74 tries, 16 drop goals, 240 conversions and 215 penalties.

His first test appearance for Wales came as a replacement against Namibia in 1990, where he played out of his usual position on the wing. He was included in the squad for Wales' 1995 tour of South Africa, but only featured in the tour match against South-East Transvaal. His second and final appearance for Wales in a test match came against Fiji in 1995, again as a replacement playing out of his usual position.
