= JD Moller =

South African rugby union player

- Born: Jan Daniel Moller; 22 October 1982 (age 44) Carnavon, South Africa
- Height: 1.88 m (6 ft 2 in)
- Weight: 115 kg (18 st 2 lb; 254 lb)
- School: Paarl Boys' High School
- University: Stellenbosch University

Rugby union career
- Position: Prop
Provincial / State sides
Years	Team	Apps	(Points)
2003–2011	Western Province	54	(15)
- Correct as of 11 February 2009
Super Rugby
Years	Team	Apps	(Points)
2005–2011	Stormers	36	(0)
- Correct as of 11 February 2009

JD Moller (born 22 October 1982 in Carnavon) is a South African rugby union footballer.
