= Cowbridge Grammar School =

Grade II* listed building in Wales

Coordinates: 51.462°N 3.450°W

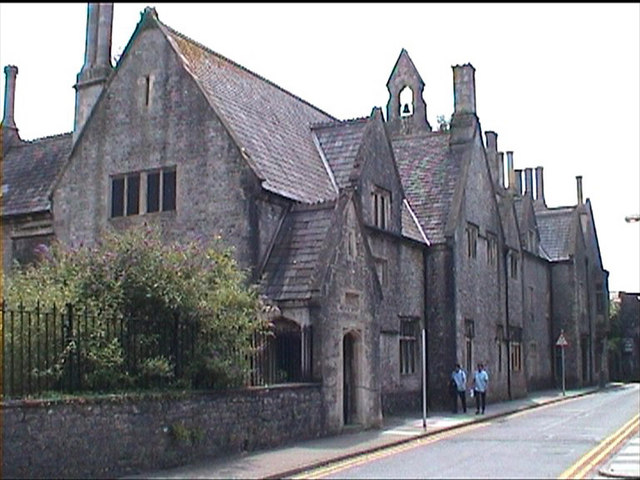

Location
- Church Street; Cowbridge, Glamorgan, CF71 7AF; Wales

Information
- Type: Grammar School
- Motto: Vigiliis et Virtute (Vigilance and Courage)
- Established: 1608
- Founder: Sir John Stradling
- Closed: 1974
- Local authority: Vale of Glamorgan
- Gender: Boys
- Age: 11 to 19
- Colours: Red and black
- Second Founder: Sir Leoline Jenkins

Cowbridge Grammar School was one of the best-known schools in Wales until its closure in 1974. It was replaced by Cowbridge Comprehensive School.

Founded in the 17th century by Sir John Stradling and refounded by Sir Leoline Jenkins, it had close links with Jesus College, Oxford. The school took both boarders and day boys. Famous old boys include actor Anthony Hopkins, poet Alun Lewis, and TV presenter Patrick Hannan.

The main school buildings were located in Church Street, Cowbridge. Derelict for some years, they have been converted into residential accommodation.

The school also occupied part of Old Hall, formerly the town house of the Edmondes family, now an adult education centre.

== History ==
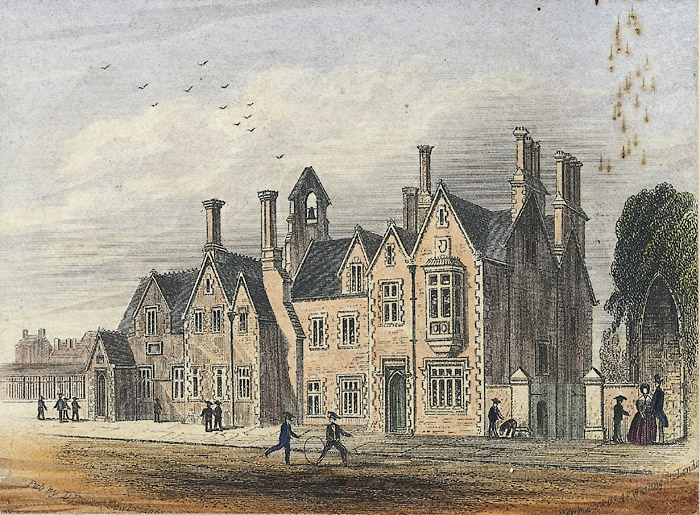
Cowbridge school, c.1860

Cowbridge Grammar School was founded in 1608 by Sir John Stradling and owned by Jesus College, Oxford, from 1685 to 1918. Sir Leoline Jenkins, Secretary of State to Charles II, purchased the school and bequeathed it to Jesus College in his will. With the introduction of Intermediate schools in Wales following the Welsh Intermediate Education Act (1889), the school refused to join the scheme. This was even discussed in Parliament. It became Cowbridge Comprehensive School in 1973-1974. What used to be the grammar school's main building, dating from 1852, was converted into residential accommodations beginning in 2006 and completed in 2008.

In 1881, Edward Treharne, who represented the school, was chosen to play in the first international game for the Wales rugby union team.

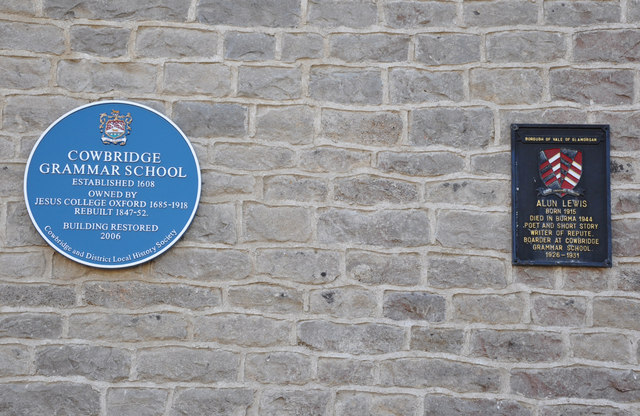
Plaque commemorating the foundation of Cowbridge Grammar School in 1608 and its historic association with Jesus College, Oxford.

== Headmasters ==
- c.1662–1669 Rev. David Lloyd
- 1669–c.1703 Rev. David Watkins
- 1703–1704 Rev. Thomas Richards
- 1704–1721 Rev. Robert Powell
- 1721–1763 Rev. Daniel Durel who was also vicar of Coychurch
- 1764–1783 Rev. Thomas Williams
- 1783–1784 Rev. John Walters
- 1785–1787 Rev. Daniel Walters
- 1787–1847 Rev. Dr. William Williams
- 1847–1850 Rev. Dr. Hugo D. Harper
- 1850–1864 Rev. W. Holt Beever
- 1864–1870 Rev. Thomas Williams
- 1870–1875 Rev. J. C. F. Morson
- 1875–1889 Rev. Morris Price Williams
- 1890–1918 Rev. W. Franklen Evans
- 1919–1938 Richard Williams
- 1938–1971 J. Idwal Rees

== Notable former pupils ==
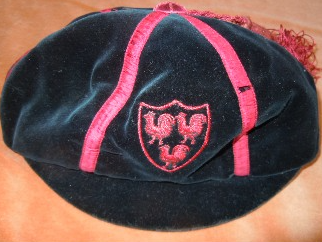
Cowbridge school cap

The following old boys are listed in date order:

- Evan Seys (1604–1685) — Attorney general to Cromwell; MP for Glamorgan and Gloucester; Recorder of Gloucester; Exclusionist and Proto-Whig
- Leoline Jenkins (1625–1685) — Secretary of State to Charles II; MP for Hythe and the University of Oxford; Judge of the High Court of the Admiralty; second founder of the school; Principal of Jesus College, Oxford
- John Pettingall (1707/8–1781) — Antiquarian and clergyman
- David Durell (1728–1775) — Old Testament Scholar; Principal of Hertford College, Oxford; Vice-Chancellor of the University of Oxford
- George Cadogan Morgan (1754–1798) — Scientific writer (notably on electricity); republican and dissenting minister
- John Nicholl (1759–1838) — Lawyer and politician: Tory MP, Privy Councillor, King's Advocate, Dean of the Arches, Judge of the High Court of the Admiralty
- William Nott (1782–1845) — General for the East India Company; Commander in the first Afghan War 1838-42; Resident at Lucknow
- Evan Evans (1813–1891) — Master of Pembroke College; Oxford and Vice-Chancellor of the University of Oxford
- Lewis Morris (1833–1907) — Writer and poet; a founder of the University of Wales; radical Liberal
- Edward Treharne (1862–1904) — Pioneering Welsh rugby international and medical man
- Glanville Williams (1911–1997) — Professor of English Law at Cambridge
- Alun Lewis (1915–1944) — Poet and soldier
- Idwal Pugh (1918–2010) — Second Permanent Secretary at Department of the Environment; Ombudsman; Director & Chairman of banks and building societies
- Keith Rowlands (1936–2006) — Welsh rugby international; First Chief Executive Officer of the International Rugby Board
- Anthony Hopkins (born 1937) — Actor/film star
- Patrick Hannan (1941–2009) — Journalist, author and presenter
- Michael Morgan (born 1942) — Scientist
