= Greg Prosser =

Wales international rugby union player

- Born: Gregory Prosser; 21 May 1966 (age 60) Swansea, Wales
- Height: 6 ft 7 in (2.01 m)
- Weight: 114 kg (17 st 13 lb)
- School: Bryn Celynnog Comprehensive School

Rugby union career
- Position: Lock
Senior career
Years	Team	Apps	(Points)
1986-1991,1994-2000	Pontypridd RFC		
1991-1993	Bridgend RFC	19	(12)
International career
Years	Team	Apps	(Points)
1995	Wales	1	(0)

Greg Prosser (born 21 May 1966) is a Welsh former international rugby union player who represented the Wales national team on one occasion during the 1995 Rugby World Cup. He played in the top division of Welsh club rugby for Pontypridd RFC, where he spent a total of twelve seasons, and Bridgend RFC for two seasons.

== Rugby career ==
Prosser first joined Pontypridd RFC in the 1986-87 season. Prosser moved to Bridgend RFC for the 1991-92 season. He made 19 appearances for Bridgend over two seasons, before rejoining Pontypridd for the 1993/94 season.

Prosser was included in the Wales squad for the 1995 Rugby World Cup, and made his only appearance for the national team during the tournament, a 34-9 defeat to New Zealand.

Prosser was part of the Pontypridd team that won the SWALEC Cup in 1996 and the Welsh Premier Division in the 1996-97 season. Between 1995 and 1999, he also made ten appearances for the invitational Barbarians side. He left Pontypridd at the end of the 1999/2000 season to join Abercynon RFC. Later he played for Llantwit Fardre RFC

== Personal life ==
Prosser is the son of Ieuan Prosser, who played rugby for Aberavon RFC. He works as a police officer for South Wales Police.
