= Percy May =

Percy May may refer to:

- Percy May (cricketer), English cricketer
- Percy May (gymnast), Welsh gymnast
