= Bleddyn Bowen =

Wales international rugby union footballer

- Born: Bleddyn Bowen; 16 July 1961 (age 65) Trebanos, Wales

Rugby union career
- Position: Centre
Amateur team(s)
Years	Team	Apps	(Points)
- South Wales Police RFC
1980-1990	Swansea RFC	34	(144)
International career
Years	Team	Apps	(Points)
1983–1989	Wales	24	(37)

Bleddyn Bowen (born 16 July 1961) is a former international Wales rugby union player.

Bleddyn Bowen played club rugby for South Wales Police and Swansea RFC. His first international game was in 1983, along with five other first caps, against Romania; a game that Wales lost heavily, 24–6.

Bowen retained his place and was called to represent Wales in the 1984 Five Nations Championship.

Bowen played in the first Rugby World Cup and was then given the honour of captaining his country in the 1988 Five Nations, a tournament in which Wales would win the Triple Crown. Bowen would be the last Welsh captain to lift the Triple Crown for 17 years.

Bleddyn Bowen made his Wales debut in the 1983, 24–6 defeat to Romania. He gained 24 caps for his country and scored five tries, five penalties and one conversion in his international career. Bowen also represented the Wales XV in a non-capped game against Japan in 1983; he scored a try in the 29–24 victory.

Bowen represented Wales in the 1987 Rugby World Cup. He scored a try against Canada in the Pool stage game. Bowen was made the captain for the following Five Nations Championship, and consequently the 1988 Welsh Triple Crown winning side. Bowen was also chosen to captain the side against New Zealand on the summer tour but a wrist injury prevented his involvement.

Domestically Bowen played rugby for the South Wales Police RFC from where he won all his caps. He is currently a regional office manager for Konica Minolta in Swansea.
