= Phil John (rugby union, born 1962) =

Welsh rugby union player (born 1962)

Phil John (born 5 February 1962) is a Welsh former rugby union player. A hooker, he played his club rugby for Pontypridd RFC and representative rugby for the Barbarians.
