= Selena Caemawr =

Welsh autism activist, entrepreneur and poet (born c. 1982)

- Born: 1982 (age 43–44)
- Education: Cardiff University
- Known for: Trans poet and activist

Selena Earnest Caemawr (born c. 1982) is a trans poet and activist based in Wales. They were nominated for a Stonewall Cymru role model award in 2023 for their activism around neurodiversity and disability inclusion. They were also named as an inspiring vegan by The Vegan Society in 2023 and have spoken about ableism in the vegan community.

== Early life and move to Wales ==
Caemawr was born to a Jamaican mother and white British father, and is the youngest of nine children. They grew up in Coventry before moving to Wales in 2005 and studying in Cardiff University

== Autism activism ==
In 2020 they set up the Aubergine Cafe in Cardiff, a 100% autistic owned vegan cafe. The cafe aims to provide an accessible environment to both autistic patrons and staff by addressing common sensory triggers that can make spaces inaccessible to autistic people such as noise from coffee machines. As well as providing an accessible space for disabled and neurodivergent people regardless of their support needs, the cafe aims to address the disparity in employment rates between autistic adults and their non-neurodivergent counterparts by providing inclusive and innovative working practices for their staff.

As well as the Aubergine cafe, Caemawr has been listed as a co-author in academic papers about autism, including work around co-creating autistic knowledge production and menstruation and autism. They also sit on a Community council for the "Autism from Menstruation to Menopause" project.

== Poetry ==
Caemawr is also a poet who received a bursary from Literature Wales in 2018

== Personal life ==
Caemawr received their autism diagnosis either in 2006 or in 2016 at the age of 34. They were also diagnosed with attention deficit hyperactivity disorder at the age of 38, realising later in life that they are most likely dyslexic, and have been diagnosed with Irlen syndrome. They identify as non-binary and lean towards a transmasculine gender presentation.
