= Phil May (rugby union) =

Wales rugby union footballer (born 1956)

- Full name: Phillip Stephen May
- Born: 1 July 1956 (age 70) Carmarthen, Wales

Rugby union career
- Position: Lock
Senior career
| Years | Team | Apps | (Points) |
| 1974–94 | Llanelli | 552 | (356) |
International career
| Years | Team | Apps | (Points) |
| 1988–91 | Wales | 7 | (0) |

Phillip Stephen May (born 1 July 1956) is a Welsh former rugby union international.

May was born in Carmarthen and attended Llanelli Grammar School.

A lock, May played a club record 552 games for Llanelli RFC, scoring 86 tries and 5 conversions. He made his debut in 1974 and broke the games record in 1991, which had been held by Wales flanker Ivor Jones for 51 years.

May earned seven Test caps for Wales during his career. He won a triple crown with Wales at the 1988 Five Nations Championship, featuring in all of the Welsh matches, then was capped twice on the 1988 tour of New Zealand. In 1991, May was unexpectedly recalled for the Rugby World Cup and came off with a dislocated shoulder in their tournament opener against Western Samoa, which would be his final appearance for Wales.

== See also ==
- List of Wales national rugby union players
