= Richie Collins =

Wales international rugby union player

- Born: Richard Graham Collins; 2 March 1962 (age 64) Cardiff, Wales
- Height: 6 ft 1 in (185 cm)
- Weight: 14 st 2 lb (198 lb; 90 kg)
- School: Mostyn School, Ely, Cardiff
- Occupation: Police officer

Rugby union career
- Position: Flanker
Amateur team(s)
Years	Team	Apps	(Points)
1982-1997	Pontypridd RFC	118	
1983-1987	Newport RFC	104	(136)
–	South Wales Police RFC		
1988-1993	Cardiff RFC	76	(45)
–	Pontypool RFC		
–	Ebbw Vale RFC		
–	Bristol		
1987-1996	Barbarian F.C.	2	(4)
–	Petrarca Pardova		
International career
Years	Team	Apps	(Points)
1986	Wales B		
1987–1994	Wales	28	(9)

Richard Graham Collins (born 2 March 1962) is a former international Wales rugby union player. Originally a police officer, he started playing club rugby for South Wales Police RFC, and later Newport RFC, Cardiff RFC, and Johnsonville RFC in Wellington, New Zealand, Pontypridd RFC (he also coached the team in 2000) and Bristol. He was also a Wales international basketball player.
