= Dale McIntosh =

Wales international rugby union player

- Born: Dale Lynsey Manawa McIntosh; 23 November 1969 (age 56) Tūrangi, New Zealand
- Height: 1.93 m (6 ft 4 in)
- Weight: 113 kg (17 st 11 lb)

Rugby union career
- Position: Number 8 or Flanker or Lock
Amateur team(s)
Years	Team	Apps	(Points)
1989-2007	Pontypridd	454	
Provincial / State sides
Years	Team	Apps	(Points)
-	Scottish Exiles		
International career
Years	Team	Apps	(Points)
1991-92	Scotland 'B'	2	(0)
1992-93	Scotland 'A'	2	(0)
1996-97	Wales	2	(0)
Coaching career
- Years: Team
- 2007–2013: Pontypridd RFC
- 2013-2015: Cardiff Blues
- 2015-2022: Merthyr RFC
- 2022 -: Brecon RFC

Dale Lynsey Manawa "Chief" McIntosh (born 23 November 1969) is a former Wales international rugby union player and now rugby union coach. He was born in Tūrangi, New Zealand.

== Rugby Union career ==
=== Amateur career ===
He played for Pontypridd.

=== Provincial career ===
McIntosh qualified to play for Scotland by virtue of a Scottish grandfather.

He played for the Scottish Exiles in the Scottish Inter-District Championship.

=== International career ===
He was capped by Scotland 'B' to play against Ireland 'B' on 28 December 1991. He was capped again by the 'B' side to play against France 'B' on 2 February 1992.

He was then capped by Scotland 'A' in 1992 and 1993. Although 'A' sides are now deemed 'capture' sides, at the time players could more easily switch nationality when captured - and McIntosh switched nationality to play for Wales when his international career seemed to stall with Scotland.

He was capped by Wales in 1996 and 1997.

== Coaching career ==
McIntosh went on to coach in Wales after his playing career ended. He coached with Pontypridd, Cardiff Blues and Merthyr.
