= 1986 Wales rugby union tour of the South Pacific =

Summary
P	W	D	L
Total
6	5	0	1
Test match
3	3	0	0
Opponent
P	W	D	L
Fiji
1	1	0	0
Tonga
1	1	0	0
Western Samoa
1	1	0	0

Tour chronology
- ← 1978 Australia 1988 New Zealand →

The 1986 Wales rugby union tour of South Pacific was a series of matches played by Wales national rugby union team in the south pacific islands.

The matches with Tonga ad Samoa was the first official matches against Wales with the official status of "full international" assigned by Welsh Rugby Union

== Results ==
Scores and results list Wales' points tally first.

Opponent	For	Against	Date	Venue	Status
Western XV	19	14	23 May 1986	Lautoka	Tour match
Eastern XV	13	29	27 May 1986	National Stadium, Suva	Tour match
Fiji	22	15	31 May 1986	National Stadium, Suva	Test match
Tonga President XV	13	9	7 June 1986	Teufaiva, Nukuʻalofa	Tour match
Tonga	15	7	12 June 1986	Teufaiva, Nukuʻalofa	Test match
Samoa	32	14	14 June 1986	Apia	Test match
