= Pontypridd RFC =

Welsh rugby union club, based in Pontypridd

Coordinates: 51.600460°N 3.346571°W

(Wales) Pontypridd Rugby Football Club
- Full name: Pontypridd Rugby Football Club
- Nickname(s): Ponty, The Valley Commandos
- Founded: 1876; 150 years ago
- Location: Pontypridd, Rhondda Cynon Taf, Wales
- Ground: Sardis Road (Capacity: 7,861)
- CEO: Stephen Reardon
- Coach: Kristian Parker
- Captain: Cally James
- Most caps: Bob Penberthy; 877
- Top scorer: Neil Jenkins; 3,185
- Most tries: Karl Swain; 179
- League: Welsh Premier Division
- 2024-25: 2nd
1st kit	2nd kit

Official website
- www.ponty.net

Pontypridd Rugby Football Club (Welsh: Clwb Rygbi Pontypridd) is a rugby union team from Pontypridd, Rhondda Cynon Taf, Wales. It competes in the Admiral Premiership and the WRU Premiership Cup, a trophy which they won for the 7th time in 2025. Their last league title winning campaign came in 2015.

Established in 1876, Pontypridd RFC play their home games on the banks of the River Rhondda at Sardis Road, Pontypridd, Rhondda Cynon Taf in Wales, with their age-grade section playing at Taff Vale Park in Pontypridd, and Pontypridd High School Fields in nearby Cilfynydd.

Pontypridd RFC experienced a successful period during the 1990s—referred to as the club's "Golden Age"—under head coach Dennis John, and they enjoyed further success between 2001 and 2003 with the appointment of head coach Lynn Howells. The transition to Regional Rugby in Wales in 2003 saw the downgrading of Pontypridd to a semi-professional team, followed by financial difficulties for the club and the eventual demise of Pontypridd's "Celtic Warriors" region.

Pontypridd RFC has since refinanced and restructured and, despite a mooted stadium sale, continues to be regarded as a relatively successful rugby team in the South Wales Valleys.

Pontypridd RFC has produced several players who went on to play for the Wales national rugby union team.

== Club history ==
=== Early history ===
Pontypridd RFC were formed in 1876 by a number of young local men who moved into the area during the Industrial Revolution. However, the first reported match involving Pontypridd was played on 18 December 1873 against Roath (Cardiff). They were represented at a meeting in Tenby in 1880 that would later lead to the formation of the Welsh Rugby Union in 1881. Pontypridd's Edward Treharne, who also played for Cowbridge Grammar School as a student, was named in the first Welsh International side in 1881. Pontypridd supplied two more players to the Welsh team before the turn of the 19th century, Tom Williams and Ernie George.

In their early days, Pontypridd RFC played their home games at Taff Vale Park in Treforest, the current home of their junior section, before moving to the People's Park alongside the River Rhondda. However, in 1908 they moved once more to a new home in Ynysangharad Park in Pontypridd itself, where they would stay for 65 years.

=== 1945–1989 ===
Pontypridd has historically been considered a club with a lower profile compared to some of the more prominent Welsh rugby clubs. Players at Pontypridd sometimes faced challenges in breaking into the national team while playing for the club, which led some to join higher-profile teams. Despite this, the club secured a series of top-ten finishes in the unofficial Welsh league, and winning the competition in the 1962/1963 season.

However the 1970s would bring Pontypridd its first period of real success. Following the redevelopment of the A470 trunk road near their home ground, the team moved to its current home of Sardis Road in Pontypridd in 1974. This move was immediately followed by success in the unofficial league championship, winning it in 1975–76, 1977–78 and 1978–79 whilst never falling from the top four for seven years under the captaincy of Bob Penberthy and Tommy David.

=== 1990–2002 ===
The 1990s saw a large change in Welsh rugby, especially with the inauguration of the first official Welsh leagues in 1990. Pontypridd were placed in the top division for that season and have until now never been out of the top-level in the Welsh game. They secured third places in 1991–92, 1993–94 and 1995–96 plus a runner up finish to Cardiff RFC.

During the 1993–94 season there was speculation about the possibility of Anglo-Welsh competition containing only the 'Big Four' Welsh clubs of Cardiff, Neath, Swansea and Llanelli. Pontypridd's 27–12 victory over Neath in November was considered to have made the case for a 'Big Five', and coach Dennis John expressed pleasure at having put an end to such speculation later in the season following a narrow defeat to Cardiff in the Welsh Cup semi-final.

In 1996 the club won its first official major honour, beating Neath RFC in the final of the Welsh Cup. They repeated this achievement again in 2002 and 2006. The following season (1997) saw them win the Welsh League, narrowly over the same opponents. Both of these successes were obtained by what many consider Pontypridd's best ever team, led by Nigel Bezani and including players such as Richie Collins, Neil Jenkins, Paul John and Dale McIntosh.

During the 2001–02 season, Pontypridd enjoyed a successful campaign, winning the Principality Cup and narrowly losing to Sale Sharks in the final of the Parker Pen Shield competition.

From then until 2003 Pontypridd consistently finished in the top five of the league but failed to challenge for top spot (and to qualify for the Heineken Cup – Europe's top tournament) as they struggled to cope with the added financial pressures of the newly professional game, losing a number of players to larger clubs and relying heavily upon their much admired youth academy system. However, in 2003 the Welsh Rugby Union would change the game in Wales forever with the advent of Welsh Regional Rugby.

=== 2003–present ===
Celtic Warriors badge – 2004–05 season (unplayed)

After much negotiation and rumour of a merger with local rivals Cardiff RFC, Pontypridd finally found themselves in a partnership with Bridgend RFC, forming the Celtic Warriors that would represent the whole of the South Wales Valleys region.

However financial difficulties at Pontypridd lead the team to sell its stake in the Warriors to Bridgend RFC benefactor Leighton Samuel and all games were moved away from Sardis Road before the club was dissolved by the WRU in the summer of 2004.

They were then reformed as Ponty Rugby Ltd playing at a semi professional level in the newly formed Welsh Premiership and unpopularly placed under the umbrella of local rivals Cardiff Blues by the WRU, Pontypridd continue to be the top team in the Glamorganshire south Wales Valleys and are considered by many of their fans to be the Valleys' regional representative side, with Cardiff still perceived by the residents of the Valleys as rivals.

In 2005 Pontypridd were the beaten finalists in the WRU Challenge Cup, narrowly losing to Llanelli 24–25, having led 24–8 with only 10 minutes remaining until a former Pontypridd player Neil Boobyer was brought into the game and helped turn the game around in Llanelli's favour.

The following year they would surpass their previous season's record as Saturday 6 May 2006 Pontypridd beat Neath 26–25 to win the WRU Challenge Cup (then called the Konica Minolta Cup, and currently called the SWALEC Cup after the sponsors of the tournament) in a final at the Millennium Stadium. Neath were pre-match favourites having recently secured the Welsh Premier league by a large points margin, and going into the game chasing a league and cup 'double'. This was a replay of the 1996 final, when Pontypridd had also stopped Neath RFC 'doing the double'.

17 May 2008 saw Pontypridd enter a repeat performance against Neath at the Millennium Stadium. The score, however, was not to be repeated, as Neath beat Pontypridd 28–22.

In the 2010–11 season, Pontypridd secured the Swalec Cup with a 35–24 victory over Aberavon at the Millennium Stadium. They also finished first in the Principality Premiership with 107 points. However, with the introduction of play-offs to determine the overall league champions, they were defeated in the final at Sardis Road by third-placed Llanelli, preventing a potential double. Additionally, they reached the semi-finals of the British & Irish Cup, where they were eliminated by eventual winners Bristol.

The club reached two finals in the following season. On 7 May 2012, they were defeated by Cross Keys in the Swalec Cup final, with a score of 32–19. However, they were crowned Welsh Champions for the first time in 15 years after securing a second consecutive first-place finish in the Principality Premiership. This led to a play-off final victory over Llanelli at Sardis Road on 18 May. The club also made the Quarter-Finals of the British & Irish Cup, losing away to Leinster 'A'.

The 2012–13 season was one of the most successful in the club's history, as Pontypridd won both the league and cup, completing a historic double. First beating Neath in the final of the Swalec Cup on 4 May 2013, 34–13 and then after finishing 23 points clear in the Principality Premiership with 21 wins from 22 matches they secured the title by defeating Llanelli in the Play-Off Final at Sardis Road on 18 May by 47–15.

The 2013–14 season saw Pontypridd repeat their success from the previous year, winning both the Swalec Cup and the Principality Premiership title. They claimed the Swalec Cup on 4 May 2014, defeating Cross Keys 21–8 at the Millennium Stadium. After finishing at the top of the Principality Premiership for the fourth consecutive season, they secured a third successive league title on 18 May 2014 with a 38–17 victory over Cross Keys in the play-off final at Sardis Road. The club also defeated London Welsh, London Scottish and Cornish Pirates on the way to the British & Irish Cup Semi-Finals before exiting the competition against Leinster 'A' following a defeat on try count following a 22–22 draw. The 2014–15 season saw Pontypridd reach a fifth consecutive Swalec Cup final, but they were defeated by Bridgend. However, they finished first in the Principality Premiership for the fifth successive season and secured a fourth consecutive league title with a 28–14 victory over Ebbw Vale in the play-off final at Sardis Road on 17 May 2015.

Despite playing at the highest level attainable by a non-regional side, Pontypridd RFC has experienced a decline in its fan base, partly due to the shift of Welsh rugby supporters in the Valleys to Cardiff Blues as their regional team. Nevertheless, Pontypridd retains one of the largest club followings in Wales.

Former Pontypridd players seen wearing the red of Wales in recent years include Gethin Jenkins, Kevin Morgan, Richard Parks, Michael Owen, Martyn Williams, Dafydd James, Mefin Davies, Brent Cockbain, Robert Sidoli, Sonny Parker, Ceri Sweeney, Ian Evans, Matthew Rees, Morgan Stoddart, Cory Hill, Kristian Dacey, Seb Davies, Dillon Lewis, Tomos Williams, Jarrod Evans, Kieron Assiratti and Corey Domachowski.

== Club shield ==
The club shield denotes the town of Pontypridd's famous arched bridge – once the largest single-span bridge in Europe – built by William Edwards in 1756 and known as the "Old Bridge".

The chevrons are an interpretation of the ancient arms of Iestyn ap Gwrgant, the last ruler of the Kingdom of Morgannwg. The de Clare family – Norman Lords of the Welsh Marches, under whose authority the ancient shire of Glamorgan was placed – used a similar design to Gwrgant's arms. Both sets of chevrons were once seen on the coat of arms of Mid Glamorgan County Council, in which the town of Pontypridd was situated prior to the Local Government Act of 1994.
An identical chevron design is now seen in the coat of arms of Rhondda Cynon Taf County Borough Council, which superseded Mid Glamorgan.

The black and white colours are the team colours of Pontypridd RFC.

Development of the Pontypridd RFC Club shield

Arms of ap Gwrgant

Arms of de Clare family

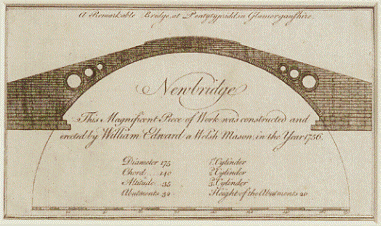
Pontypridd's "Old Bridge"

== Sponsorship ==
Pontypridd's most notable main sponsor was local company, Buy As You View. The company began life as Just Rentals in Tonypandy in 1976, and sponsored Pontypridd RFC from the early nineties until 2004. It employed numerous former players, including Neil Jenkins and Lee Beach and ran the Buy As You View Schools Rugby Initiative, working in partnership with Pontypridd RFC.

Pontypridd's main sponsor from 2004 to 2009 was Pontypridd-based environmental and waste management company, Egan Waste Services.

In 2009, Pontypridd-based company Amber Electrical become the club's main sponsors in a highly publicised partnership deal.

2010 saw Egan Waste Services step up their support of Pontypridd by becoming the club's main sponsors once more.

Club kit has been supplied by numerous firms, including Umbro, Hogger Sports, Cica, Rossco, Canterbury of New Zealand, Kukri Sports, Errea, Rhino Rugby and Mizuno. Kappa became the club's kit suppliers for the start of the 2018–19 season.

== Statistics ==
=== Club honours & Achievements ===
Welsh Premier Division Champions – 1996–97, 2011–12, 2012–13, 2013–14, 2014–15
Welsh Premier Division Runners Up – 1994–95, 1998–99, 2010–11, 2015–16, 2024-25
WRU Merit Table Champions – 1975–76
WRU Merit Table Runners Up – 1977–78, 1978–79
Western Mail Welsh Championship Winners – 1963, 1976, 1978, 1979
WRU National Cup Winners – 1995–96, 2001–02, 2005–06, 2010–11, 2012–13, 2013–14, 2024-25
WRU National Cup Runners Up – 1978–79, 1994–95, 2004–05, 2007–08, 2011–12, 2014–15, 2016–17
WRU Fosters Challenge Cup Winners – 2015–16
WRU Challenge Trophy Winners – 1997–98
WRU Challenge Trophy Runners-Up – 1998–99
WRU Champions Challenge Winners – 1996
European Rugby Shield Runners Up – 2001–02
European Rugby Shield Semi-Finalists – 2002–03
British & Irish Cup Semi-Finalists – 2010–11, 2013–14
Mid District Premiership Cup Runners-Up – 2024-25
Glamorgan County Silver Ball Trophy Runners Up – 2002-03
WRU National 7s Tournament Winners – 2013
WRU National 7s Tournament Runners Up – 2014, 2015
Abercynon 7s Tournament Winners – 2008, 2009, 2010
Abercwmboi 7s Tournament Winners – 2017

=== Welsh Leagues ===
Season	Division	Pos	Played	Won	Drawn	Lost	Play-Offs
1990–91	1	5th	44	30	2	12	
1991–92	1	3rd	47	35	0	12	
1992–93	1	5th	40	24	3	13	
1993–94	1	3rd	22	17	1	4	
1994–95	1	2nd	22	17	0	5	
1995–96	1	3rd	22	16	1	5	
1996–97	1	1st	22	20	0	2	
1997–98	Premier	3rd	14	8	2	4	
1998–99	Premier	2nd	20	12	0	8	
1999–00	Welsh/Scottish	4th	22	14	2	6	
2000–01	Welsh/Scottish	9th	22	10	0	12	
2001–02	Welsh/Scottish	7th	20	9	0	11	
2002–03	Premiership	6th	16	6	1	9	
2003–04	Premiership	3rd	30	20	2	8	
2004–05	Premiership	10th	32	17	1	14	
2005–06	Premiership	3rd	30	21	0	9	
2006–07	Premiership	4th	26	16	1	9	
2007–08	Premiership	3rd	26	16	1	9	
2008–09	Premiership	5th	26	16	2	8	
2009–10	Premiership	4th	26	16	1	9	
2010–11	Premiership	1st	26	23	1	2	Lost to Llanelli 18–24
2011–12	Premiership	1st	26	19	0	7	Beat Llanelli 15–13
2012–13	Premiership	1st	22	21	0	1	Beat Llanelli 47–15
2013–14	Premiership	1st	22	16	1	5	Beat Cross Keys 38–17
2014–15	Premiership	1st	22	21	0	1	Beat Ebbw Vale 28–14
2015–16	Premiership	1st	22	17	0	5	Lost to Ebbw Vale 12–38
2016–17	Premiership	5th	22	13	0	9	
2017–18	Premiership	3rd	29	23	0	6	
2018–19	Premiership	3rd	30	22	0	8	
2019–20	Premiership	5th*	18	10	0	8	*Season cancelled
2021–22	Premiership	7th	11	7	0	4	
2022–23	Premiership	10th	22	5	0	17	
2023–24	Premiership	7th	24	12	1	11	
2024-25	Premiership	2nd	24	18	0	6	
2025-26	Premiership	3rd	24	20	0	4	

== Cup Final history ==
Year	Opponent	Result	Score	Competition	Venue
1979	Bridgend	Lost	12–18	Schweppes Cup	National Stadium, Cardiff
1995	Swansea	Lost	12–17	Swalec Cup	National Stadium, Cardiff
1996	Neath	Won	29–22	Swalec Cup	National Stadium, Cardiff
1996	Neath	Won	60–19	WRU Champions Challenge	National Stadium, Cardiff
1998	Cardiff	Won	15–10	WRU Challenge Trophy	Sardis Road
1999	Llanelli	Lost	18–41	WRU Challenge Trophy	Stradey Park
2002	Llanelli	Won	20–17	Principality Cup	Millennium Stadium, Cardiff
2002	Sale Sharks	Lost	22–25	Parker Pen European Shield	Kassam Stadium, Oxford
2005	Llanelli	Lost	24–25	Konica Minolta Cup	Millennium Stadium, Cardiff
2006	Neath	Won	26–25	Konica Minolta Cup	Millennium Stadium, Cardiff
2008	Neath	Lost	22–28	Konica Minolta Cup	Millennium Stadium, Cardiff
2011	Aberavon	Won	35–24	Swalec Cup	Millennium Stadium, Cardiff
2011	Llanelli	Lost	18–24	Principality Premiership Play-Off Final	Sardis Road
2012	Cross Keys	Lost	19–32	Swalec Cup	Millennium Stadium, Cardiff
2012	Llanelli	Won	15-13	Principality Premiership Play-Off Final	Sardis Road
2013	Neath	Won	34–13	Swalec Cup	Millennium Stadium, Cardiff
2013	Llanelli	Won	47-15	Principality Premiership Play-Off Final	Sardis Road
2014	Cross Keys	Won	21–8	Swalec Cup	Millennium Stadium, Cardiff
2014	Cross Keys	Won	38-17	Principality Premiership Play-Off Final	Sardis Road
2015	Bridgend	Lost	15–19	Swalec Cup	Millennium Stadium, Cardiff
2015	Ebbw Vale	Won	28-14	Principality Premiership Play-Off Final	Sardis Road
2016	Bedwas	Won	38–34	Fosters Challenge Cup	Brewery Field, Bridgend
2016	Ebbw Vale	Lost	12-38	Principality Premiership Play-Off Final	Sardis Road
2017	RGC 1404	Lost	11–15	WRU National Cup	Millennium Stadium, Cardiff
2025	Cross Keys	Won	43–12	WRU Premiership Cup	Millennium Stadium, Cardiff
2025	Merthyr	Lost	14-26	Worthington Mid District Premiership Cup Final	Sardis Road

== Team management, players and former players ==
=== Team management ===
Pontypridd RFC have been led by a number of high-profile coaches since the 1980s, Clive Jones – a prominent figure in Treorchy RFC's 1993/94 Heineken League successes – was instrumental in ensuring Pontypridd's place in the top tier during the latter part of the eighties.

In 1992, Dennis John took over as head coach, assisted by former Pontypridd flanker, Lynn Howells, and led Pontypridd into what is widely regarded as their "Golden Age", with Ponty winning the Welsh Cup Final in the 1995–96 season, and winning the Welsh Premier League in the 1996–97 season.

With the departure of John in 1999, former Pontypridd and Wales flanker, Richie Collins became head coach, and while some significant scalps – notably a win over Heineken Cup winners Leicester in 2000 – came his way, his tenure in charge was short-lived.

In September 2001, Clive Jones rejoined Pontypridd as director of rugby, and had, by December 2001, brought Lynn Howells back from Cardiff, who then proceeded to marshal the club to become Principality Cup winners in May 2002 and guided the team to the final of the Parker Pen European Shield days later. The advent of Regional Rugby in 2003 saw Howells depart to become coach of parent-region, the Celtic Warriors, with former Pontypridd flanker, Justin Burnell filling the void.

Burnell's departure in 2004 was followed by the appointment of former Pontypridd flanker, Simon King who, along with assistant coach, former Pontypridd and Wales captain and scrum-half Paul John, guided Pontypridd to the final of the Konica Minolta Cup in 2004–05, before winning it in 2005–06.

Paul John took over as head coach in at the commencement of the 2006–07 season, and, assisted by former Pontypridd and Wales back row, Dale McIntosh, led the club to the final of the Konica Minolta Cup in 2007/08.

During May 2010, it was decided that Paul John and Dale McIntosh would switch roles, as the demands on John in his capacity as head coach of the Wales Sevens team were becoming too great. Dale McIntosh therefore leads Pontypridd into the 2010–11 season as head coach, while Paul John assumes the mantle of assistant coach.

McIntosh left his role in October 2013 to take up a full-time position with the Cardiff Blues, leading to a restructure of the Pontypridd coaching team with Paul John as head coach, being backed up by Gareth Wyatt and Geraint Lewis with another former Wales international Garin Jenkins also joining the backroom staff. After playing his part in continuing the club's success, Lewis has since departed to become a full-time WRU skills coach being replaced as forwards coach by another former Pontypridd player in Robert Sidoli.

Justin Burnell returned to Pontypridd as director of rugby in the summer of 2017, replacing the previous coaching team of John and Sidoli, whilst Paul Matthews replaced Wyatt, who departed to join up with the Wales Women's team the following year.

The current team manager is former Pontypridd player, Dan Godfrey, and the Forwards coach is Lee Davies.

=== Current coaching staff ===
Position	Name
Head coach	Kristian Parker
Backs/Skills Coach	Gavin Dacey
Skills Coach	Iestyn Harris
Conditioning Coach	Nathan Evans
Team Manager	Stuart Rix

Position	Name
Club Captain	Cally James
Co-Vice Captain	Cai James
Co-Vice Captain	Logan Jones

==== Notable former management staff ====
- (Wales) Billy Griffiths (coach)
- (Wales) Clive Jones (coach & director of rugby)
- (Wales) Dennis John (Head Coach)
- (Wales) Lynn Howells (Head coach & assistant coach)
- (Wales) Steve Richards (fitness coach)
- (Wales) Richie Collins (Head coach)
- (Wales) Justin Burnell (Head coach & Director of Rugby)
- (Wales) Simon King (Head coach)
- (Wales) Steele Lewis (assistant coach)
- (Wales) Mike Griffiths (scrum coach)
- (Wales) Nigel Bezani (team manager)
- (Wales) Eddie Jones (team manager)
- (Wales) Gary Jones (team manager)
- (Wales) Dale McIntosh (Head coach)
- (Wales) Paul John (Head coach)
- (Wales) Geraint Lewis (forwards coach)
- (Wales) Garin Jenkins (scrum coach)
- (Wales) Rob Sidoli (forwards coach)
- (Wales) Richard Langmead (team manager)
- (Wales) Gareth Wyatt (Head coach)
- (Wales) Dan Godfrey (team manager)
- (Cyprus) Chris Dicomidis (Head coach)

=== International players ===
==== Senior international sevens players ====
- (Wales) Cally James
- (Wales) Dale Stuckey

==== Under 20 international players ====
- (Wales) Ioan Evans
- (Wales) Cally James

=== Former players ===
- (Wales) Kieron Assiratti
- (Wales) Gareth Baber
- (Wales) Matthew Back
- (Wales) Liam Belcher
- (England) Duncan Bell
- (Wales) Nigel Bezani
- (Wales) Dane Blacker
- (United States) Tom Billups
- (Wales) Neil Boobyer
- (Wales) Billy Boston
- (Wales) Aled Brew
- (Wales) Jonathan Bryant
- (Wales) Brent Cockbain
- (Wales) Richie Collins
- (Wales) Macauley Cook
- (Wales) Crispin Cormack
- (Wales) Sven Cronk
- (Wales) Gavin Dacey
- (Wales) Kristian Dacey
- (Wales) Brett Davey
- (Wales) Tommy David
- (Wales) Mefin Davies
- (Wales) Seb Davies
- (Wales) Will Davies-King
- (Cyprus) Chris Dicomidis
- (Wales) Corey Domachowski
- (Wales) Ian Evans
- (Wales) Jarrod Evans
- (Wales) Dai Flanagan
- (Tonga) Taufaʻao Filise
- (Wales) Dan Godfrey
- (Wales) Ian Gough
- (Wales) Graham Gittins
- (Wales) Mason Grady
- (Wales) Mike Griffiths
- (Wales) Cory Hill
- (Wales) Sam Hobbs
- (England) Simon Humberstone
- (Wales) Dafydd James
- (England) Will James
- (Wales) Lee Jarvis
- (Wales) Ellis Jenkins
- (Wales) Gethin Jenkins
- (Wales) Neil Jenkins
- (Wales) Phil John
- (Wales) Paul John
- (Wales) WillGriff John
- (Wales) Gary Jones
- (Wales) Kingsley Jones
- (Wales) Paul Knight
- (Wales) Tavis Knoyle
- (Wales) Dillon Lewis
- (Wales) Geraint Lewis
- (Wales) Jason Lewis
- (Wales) Steele Lewis
- (Wales) Shane Lewis-Hughes
- (Fiji) Nicky Little
- (Wales) Christian Loader
- (Wales) Dafydd Lockyer
- (Czech Republic) Jan Machacek
- (Argentina) Christian Martin
- (Wales) Jonathan Mason
- (Fiji) Niko Matawalu
- (Wales) Dale McIntosh
- (Wales) Kevin Morgan
- (Wales) Matthew Nutthall
- (Wales) Wayne O'Connor
- (Wales) Michael Owen
- (Wales) Sonny Parker
- (Wales) Richard Parks
- (Canada) Sion Parry
- (Wales) Bob Penberthy
- (Wales) Greg Prosser
- (Wales) Matthew Rees
- (Canada) Pat Riordan
- (Wales) Russell Robins
- (Wales) Mark Rowley
- (Wales) Matthew Screech
- (Wales) Rhys Shellard
- (Wales) Robert Sidoli
- (Wales) Morgan Stoddart
- (Wales) Nathan Strong
- (Wales) Ceri Sweeney
- (Tonga) Ngalu Ta'u
- (Cook Islands) Tu Tamarua
- (Wales) Edward Treharne
- (Tonga) Fe'ao Vunipola
- (England) Damien Welch
- (Wales) Tomos Williams
- (Wales) Martyn Williams
- (Wales) Gareth Wyatt
- (Wales) Thomas Young

==== Club captains ====
- 1876–1877 James Spickett
- 1877–1879 Henry Briscoe
- 1880–1881 David Treharne
- 1883–1884 William Spickett
- 1894–1895 Ernest George
- 1895–1896 Jack Morgan
- 1898–1899 Billy Rees
- 1900–? Rowley Thomas
- 1906–1907 Duncan McGregor
- 1911–? Frank Hawkins
- 1920 W R Thomas
- 1928–1929 Dick Elliott
- 1945–1947 Jeff Scott
- 1947–1948 Len Arnold
- 1948–1949 Viv Jenkins/Dennis Prater/Tom Hughes
- 1949–1950 Des Jones
- 1950–1951 Des Jones/Roy Roberts
- 1951–1952 Des Jones
- 1952–1953 Bobby Narbett
- 1953–1954 Gordon Matthews
- 1954–1955 Gordon Matthews
- 1955–1958 Russell Robins
- 1958–1959 Jock Watkins
- 1959–1960 T Brian "Shrimp" Williams
- 1960–1962 Graham Gittins
- 1962–1964 Eddie Jones
- 1964–1965 Russell Jones
- 1965–1966 Tommy Coombes
- 1966–1967 Byron Broadstock/Tommy Coombes
- 1967–1968 Joe Smith
- 1968–1969 Arfon Jones
- 1969–1970 Joe Smith
- 1970–1971 Bob Penberthy
- 1971–1973 Dennis John
- 1973–1974 Wayne Evans
- 1974–1975 Bill Davey
- 1975–1977 Bob Penberthy
- 1977–1981 Tommy David
- 1981–1982 Robin Morgan
- 1982–1983 Mike Alexander
- 1983–1984 Bob Dyer
- 1984–1985 John O'Callaghan
- 1985–1987 Kerry Williams
- 1987–1988 Phil John
- 1988–1990 Ceri Jones
- 1990–1991 Paul Knight
- 1991–1992 Steele Lewis
- 1992–1996 Nigel Bezani
- 1996–1999 Neil Jenkins
- 1999–2000 Dale McIntosh
- 2000–2001 Paul John
- 2001–2002 Dale McIntosh
- 2002–2003 Mefin Davies
- 2003–2004 Dale McIntosh
- 2004–2005 Paul Matthews
- 2005–2006 Dale McIntosh
- 2006–2010 Nathan Strong
- 2010–2013 Chris Dicomidis
- 2014–2021 Dafydd Lockyer
- 2021-2022 Morgan Sieniawksi
- 2022-2024 Kristian Parker
- 2024- Cally James

== Games played against international opposition ==
Year	Date	Opponent	Result	Score	Tour
1979	26 September	Romania	Lost	3–9	1979 Romania rugby union tour of Wales
1981	1 December	Australia	Lost	3–6	1981–82 Australia tour of Britain & Ireland
1985	10 April	Spain	Won	6–4	1985 Spain tour of Wales
1988	8 November	Samoa	Lost	22–23	1988 Western Samoa rugby union tour of Britain and Ireland
1994	22 November	South Africa	Lost	3–9	1994 South Africa rugby union tour of Britain and Ireland
1995	4 November	Fiji	Won	31–13	1995 Fiji tour of Wales
1997	7 January	United States	Lost	13–15	1997 United States rugby union tour of Wales
1998	10 January	Namibia	Won	34–3	WRU Challenge Cup International Invitational
1999	23 January	Canada	Won	52–10	WRU Challenge Cup International Invitational
1999	27 January	Georgia	Won	69–7	WRU Challenge Cup International Invitational
1999	18 August	Canada	Won	20–6	1999 Canada tour of Wales

== Pontypridd youth and junior teams ==
With the loss of their extremely successful Academy set up that was handed over to their Cardiff rivals by the WRU, Pontypridd RFC re-formed a Youth side in 2006, coached by Sean Oliver and Wayne Gristock (formerly Porth Harlequins RFC).

Starting in the bottom division of the Blues league, the side made progress that saw them earn the nickname the 'Upstarts', when after a successful first season that saw them promoted seven divisions to the BB League (Blues Second Division).

The following season saw the formation of a second Youth team who again had to start in the bottom league and were coached by former Pontypridd players Dai Legge and Mike Kelleher. By the end of the 2007/8 season both youth teams had won their respective leagues outright and earned automatic promotion, with the senior youth now playing in the top division in only their third season since forming. Several youth players have gained honours, including representative honours with Welsh Crawshays and Welsh Schoolboys, with players in the Cardiff Blues Academy and several older players now training with Pontypridd RFC's senior team.

Behind this youth setup is the Pontypridd Mini & Junior Section that was formed in 1997, the section started out with just a handful of junior players and volunteer coaches, but has grown into one of the biggest junior sections in Wales. The section contains every age group from under 7s to under 16s, with the youth sides containing players under the age of 19; with almost 300 young players in their ever-swelling ranks. The section has been successful, winning multiple tournaments and competing successfully in international tournaments throughout Europe.

At the commencement of the 2008–09 season, it was decided that both Senior and Junior Youth teams would merge, forming a large and capable new Pontypridd Youth section. The new season will see a single squad of 35 players being selected, playing in the 2008–09 RAF Youth League: Blues Region. The squad is coached by Wayne Gristock and Sean Oliver, and managed by Chris Kingsbury MBE.

Prior to the commencement of the 2010–11 season, notification was given of a major change in the running of the Youth section, as it was decided that the section would transfer from the hands of the Mini & Junior Rugby section, and would instead fall under the remit of the senior Team Management. The hope is to discover new stars of the future, who will regularly train alongside the main body of the senior XV, echoing the past achievements of the Pontypridd Youth setup in bringing Michael Owen, Gethin Jenkins and Ceri Sweeney, amongst others, to the attention of the World.

== See also ==
- Celtic Warriors
- Pro14
- Heineken Cup
- Parker Pen European Shield
- British and Irish Cup
- Principality Premiership
- SWALEC Cup

== Bibliography ==
- Smith, David; Williams, Gareth (1980). Fields of Praise: The Official History of The Welsh Rugby Union. Cardiff: University of Wales Press. ISBN 0-7083-0766-3.
- Thomas, J.B.G. (1980). The Illustrated History of Welsh Rugby. London: Pelham books Ltd. ISBN 0-7207-1268-8.
