= 1983 Five Nations Championship squads =

Rugby union competition squads

== England ==
Head coach: Dick Greenwood

1. Steve Bainbridge
2. Steve Boyle
3. John Carleton
4. Maurice Colclough
5. Les Cusworth
6. Huw Davies
7. Paul Dodge
8. Dusty Hare
9. Bob Hesford
10. John Horton
11. Nick Jeavons
12. Steve Mills
13. Gary Pearce
14. John Scott (c.)**
15. Colin Smart
16. Steve Smith (c.)*
17. Tony Swift
18. David Trick
19. Peter Wheeler
20. Peter Winterbottom
21. Nick Youngs

== France ==
Head coach: Jacques Fouroux

1. Christian Bélascain
2. Pierre Berbizier
3. Serge Blanco
4. Didier Camberabero
5. Didier Codorniou
6. Jean Condom
7. Christian Delage
8. Philippe Dintrans
9. Pierre Dospital
10. Jean-Louis Dupont
11. Dominique Erbani
12. Patrick Estève
13. Bernard Herrero
14. Jean-François Imbernon
15. Jean-Luc Joinel
16. Gérald Martinez
17. Jean-Charles Orso
18. Robert Paparemborde
19. Jean-Pierre Rives (c.)
20. Laurent Rodriguez
21. Philippe Sella
22. Bernard Vivies

== Ireland ==
Head coach: Willie John McBride

1. Ollie Campbell
2. Willie Duggan
3. Moss Finn
4. Ciaran Fitzgerald (c.)
5. David Irwin
6. Moss Keane
7. Michael Kiernan
8. Donal Lenihan
9. Hugo MacNeill
10. Robbie McGrath
11. Ginger McLoughlin
12. John O'Driscoll
13. Phil Orr
14. Trevor Ringland
15. Fergus Slattery
- Ireland used the same 15 players during all the tournament

== Scotland ==
Head coach: Jim Telfer

1. Jim Aitken (c.)*
2. Roger Baird
3. John Beattie
4. Jim Calder
5. Bill Cuthbertson
6. Colin Deans
7. Peter Dods
8. Brian Gossman
9. David Johnston
10. Roy Laidlaw (c.)**
11. David Leslie
12. Gerry McGuinness
13. Iain Milne
14. Iain Paxton
15. Jim Pollock
16. Jim Renwick
17. Keith Robertson
18. Tom Smith
19. Alan Tomes

== Wales ==
Head coach: John Bevan

1. Rob Ackerman
2. Eddie Butler (c.)
3. Malcolm Dacey
4. Richard Donovan
5. Ian Eidman
6. Gwyn Evans
7. Terry Holmes
8. Billy James
9. Staff Jones
10. Richard Moriarty
11. Bob Norster
12. John Perkins
13. Dai Pickering
14. Graham Price
15. Clive Rees
16. Elgan Rees
17. David Richards
18. Mark Ring
19. Jeff Squire
20. Clive Williams
21. Mark Wyatt
