= 1984 Five Nations Championship squads =

Rugby union competition squads

== England ==
Head coach: Dick Greenwood

1. Steve Bainbridge
2. Bryan Barley
3. Phil Blakeway
4. John Carleton
5. Maurice Colclough
6. David Cooke
7. Les Cusworth
8. Huw Davies
9. Andy Dun
10. Jon Hall
11. Dusty Hare
12. Gary Pearce
13. Paul Rendall
14. John Scott
15. Paul Simpson
16. Mike Slemen
17. Rory Underwood
18. Colin White
19. Peter Wheeler (c.)
20. Peter Winterbottom
21. Clive Woodward
22. Nick Youngs

== France ==
Head coach: Jacques Fouroux

1. Jacques Begu
2. Serge Blanco
3. Didier Codorniou
4. Jean Condom
5. Michel Crémaschi
6. Philippe Dintrans
7. Pierre Dospital
8. Daniel Dubroca
9. Dominique Erbani
10. Patrick Estève
11. Jérôme Gallion
12. Jean-Pierre Garuet-Lempirou
13. Francis Haget
14. Jean-Luc Joinel
15. Patrice Lagisquet
16. Jean-Patrick Lescarboura
17. Alain Lorieux
18. Jean-Charles Orso
19. Jean-Pierre Rives (c.)
20. Laurent Rodriguez
21. Philippe Sella

== Ireland ==
Head coach: Willie John McBride

1. Ollie Campbell
2. Hugh Condon
3. Keith Crossan
4. Tony Doyle
5. Willie Duggan (c.)*
6. William Duncan
7. Ciaran Fitzgerald (c.)
8. Des Fitzgerald
9. Harry Harbison
10. David Irwin
11. Moss Keane
12. Michael Kiernan
13. Donal Lenihan
14. Hugo MacNeill
15. J. J. McCoy
16. Derek McGrath
17. Robbie McGrath
18. Ginger McLoughlin
19. Rory Moroney
20. John Murphy
21. John O'Driscoll
22. Phil Orr
23. Trevor Ringland
24. Fergus Slattery
25. Tony Ward

*captain in the first two games

== Scotland ==
Head coach: Jim Telfer

1. Jim Aitken (c.)
2. Roger Baird
3. Jim Calder
4. Alister Campbell
5. Bill Cuthbertson
6. Colin Deans
7. Peter Dods
8. Gordon Hunter
9. David Johnston
10. Euan Kennedy
11. Roy Laidlaw
12. David Leslie
13. Iain Milne
14. Steve Munro
15. Iain Paxton
16. Jim Pollock
17. Keith Robertson
18. John Rutherford
19. Alan Tomes

== Wales ==
Head coach: John Bevan

1. Rob Ackerman
2. Bleddyn Bowen
3. Eddie Butler (c.)*
4. Malcolm Dacey
5. Howell Davies
6. Mark Douglas
7. Ian Eidman
8. Adrian Hadley
9. Terry Holmes
10. Billy James
11. Staff Jones
12. Rhys Morgan
13. Richard Moriarty
14. Bob Norster
15. John Perkins
16. Dai Pickering
17. Ian Stephens
18. Mark Titley
19. Mike Watkins (c.)**
