= 1983 Five Nations Championship =

Six Nations Championship season

- Date: 15 January - 19 March 1983
- Countries: England; Ireland; France; Scotland; Wales

Tournament statistics
- Champions: France and Ireland
- Matches played: 10
- Tries scored: 24 (2.4 per match)
- Top point scorer: (Ireland) Ollie Campbell (52)
- Top try scorer: (France) Patrick Estève (5)

The 1983 Five Nations Championship was the 54th series of the rugby union Five Nations Championship.

Including the previous incarnations as the Home Nations and Five Nations, this was the 89th series of the northern hemisphere rugby union championship. Ten matches were played between 15 January and 19 March. For the 17th time, the championship was shared. France and Ireland finished level on points, and no tie-break procedure existed before 1993. It was France's 5th shared title, and Ireland's 8th.

French wing Patrick Estève scored a try against each other team in this tournament, finishing as the top try scorer, with five tries. This was the first time since 1925 that such a feat had been achieved.

== Participants ==
The teams involved were:

Nation	Venue	City	Head coach	Captain
England	Twickenham	London	Dick Greenwood	Steve Smith/John Scott
France	Parc des Princes	Paris	Jacques Fouroux	Jean-Pierre Rives
Ireland	Lansdowne Road	Dublin	Willie John McBride	Ciaran Fitzgerald
Scotland	Murrayfield	Edinburgh	Jim Telfer	Jim Aitken/Roy Laidlaw
Wales	National Stadium	Cardiff	John Bevan	Eddie Butler

== Table ==
Pos	Team	Pld	W	D	L	PF	PA	PD	Pts
1	France	4	3	0	1	70	61	+9	6
1	Ireland	4	3	0	1	71	67	+4	6
3	Wales	4	2	1	1	64	53	+11	5
4	Scotland	4	1	0	3	65	65	0	2
5	England	4	0	1	3	55	79	−24	1

== Results ==
1983-01-15

England	15–19	France
Pen.: Hare (4); Drops: Cusworth		Tries: Estève; Paparemborde; Sella; Con.: Blanco (2); Pen.: Camberabero

Twickenham, London
Attendance: 70,000
Referee: D. I. H. Burnett (Ireland)

FB	15	Dusty Hare
RW	14	John Carleton
OC	13	Huw Davies
IC	12	Paul Dodge
LW	11	Tony Swift
FH	10	Les Cusworth
SH	9	Steve Smith (c)
N8	8	John Scott
OF	7	Peter Winterbottom
BF	6	Nick Jeavons
RL	5	Steve Bainbridge
LL	4	Maurice Colclough
TP	3	Gary Pearce
HK	2	Peter Wheeler
LP	1	Colin Smart
Replacements:
LK		Bob Hesford
Coach:
(England) Dick Greenwood

FB	15	Serge Blanco
RW	14	Philippe Sella
OC	13	Christian Bélascain
IC	12	Didier Codorniou
LW	11	Patrick Estève
FH	10	Didier Camberabero
SH	9	Gérald Martinez
N8	8	Jean-Luc Joinel
OF	7	Laurent Rodriguez
BF	6	Jean-Pierre Rives (c)
RL	5	Jean Condom
LL	4	Jean-Charles Orso
TP	3	Robert Paparemborde
HK	2	Philippe Dintrans
LP	1	Pierre Dospital
Coach:
(France) Jacques Fouroux

1983-01-15

Scotland	13–15	Ireland
Tries: Laidlaw; Pen.: Dods (2); Drops: Renwick		Tries: Kiernan; Con.: Campbell; Pen: Campbell (3)

Murrayfield, Edinburgh
Referee: J. Y. Yche (France)

FB	15	Peter Dods
RW	14	Keith Robertson
OC	13	Jim Renwick
IC	12	David Johnston
LW	11	Roger Baird
FH	10	Ron Wilson
SH	9	Roy Laidlaw (c)
N8	8	Iain Paxton
OF	7	David Leslie
BF	6	Jim Calder
RL	5	Alan Tomes
LL	4	Bill Cuthbertson
TP	3	Iain Milne
HK	2	Colin Deans
LP	1	Gerry McGuinness
Coach:
(Scotland) Jim Telfer

FB	15	Hugo MacNeill
RW	14	Trevor Ringland
OC	13	David Irwin
IC	12	Mike Kiernan
LW	11	Moss Finn
FH	10	Ollie Campbell
SH	9	Robbie McGrath
N8	8	Willie Duggan
OF	7	John O'Driscoll
BF	6	Fergus Slattery
RL	5	Moss Keane
LL	4	Donal Lenihan
TP	3	Ginger McLoughlin
HK	2	Ciaran Fitzgerald (c)
LP	1	Philip Orr
Coach:
(Ireland) Willie John McBride

1983-02-05

France	19–15	Scotland
Tries: Estève (2); Con.: Blanco; Pen.: Blanco (3)		Tries: Robertson; Con: Dods; Pen.: Dods; Drops: Gossman (2)

Parc des Princes, Paris
Attendance: 45,204
Referee: A. Richards (Wales)

FB	15	Serge Blanco
RW	14	Philippe Sella
OC	13	Didier Codorniou
IC	12	Christian Bélascain
LW	11	Patrick Estève
FH	10	Christian Delage
SH	9	Pierre Berbizier
N8	8	Jean-Luc Joinel
OF	7	Laurent Rodriguez
BF	6	Jean-Pierre Rives (c)
RL	5	Jean-Charles Orso
LL	4	Jean Condom
TP	3	Robert Paparemborde
HK	2	Jean-Louis Dupont
LP	1	Pierre Dospital
Replacements:
FL		Dominique Erbani
Coach:
(France) Jacques Fouroux

FB	15	Peter Dods
RW	14	Keith Robertson
OC	13	Jim Renwick
IC	12	David Johnston
LW	11	Roger Baird
FH	10	Brian Gossman
SH	9	Roy Laidlaw (c)
N8	8	John Beattie
OF	7	David Leslie
BF	6	Jim Calder
RL	5	Alan Tomes
LL	4	Bill Cuthbertson
TP	3	Iain Milne
HK	2	Colin Deans
LP	1	Jim Aitken
Coach:
(Scotland) Jim Telfer

1983-02-05

Wales	13–13	England
Tries: Squire; Pen.: Wyatt (2); Drops: Dacey		Tries: Carleton; Pen:: Hare (2); Drops: Cusworth

National Stadium, Cardiff
Referee: J. R. West (Ireland)

FB	15	Mark Wyatt
RW	14	Elgan Rees
OC	13	David Richards
IC	12	Mark Ring
LW	11	Clive Rees
FH	10	Malcolm Dacey
SH	9	Terry Holmes
N8	8	Eddie Butler (c)
OF	7	David Pickering
BF	6	Jeff Squire
RL	5	Richard Moriarty
LL	4	Bob Norster
TP	3	Graham Price
HK	2	Billy James
LP	1	Clive Williams
Coach:
(Wales) John Bevan

FB	15	Dusty Hare
RW	14	John Carleton
OC	13	Huw Davies
IC	12	Paul Dodge
LW	11	Tony Swift
FH	10	Les Cusworth
SH	9	Steve Smith (c)
N8	8	John Scott
OF	7	Peter Winterbottom
BF	6	Nick Jeavons
RL	5	Steve Bainbridge
LL	4	Steve Boyle
TP	3	Gary Pearce
HK	2	Steve Mills
LP	1	Colin Smart
Coach:
(England) Dick Greenwood

1983-02-19

Ireland	22–16	France
Tries: Finn (2); Con.: Campbell; Pen.: Campbell (4)		Tries: Blanco; Estève; Con.: Blanco; Pen.: Blanco (2)

Lansdowne Road, Dublin
Attendance: 50,000
Referee: Alan Hosie (Scotland)

FB	15	Hugo MacNeill
RW	14	Trevor Ringland
OC	13	David Irwin
IC	12	Mike Kiernan
LW	11	Moss Finn
FH	10	Ollie Campbell
SH	9	Robbie McGrath
N8	8	Willie Duggan
OF	7	John O'Driscoll
BF	6	Fergus Slattery
RL	5	Moss Keane
LL	4	Donal Lenihan
TP	3	Ginger McLoughlin
HK	2	Ciaran Fitzgerald (c)
LP	1	Philip Orr
Coach:
(Ireland) Willie John McBride

FB	15	Serge Blanco
RW	14	Philippe Sella
OC	13	Christian Bélascain
IC	12	Didier Codorniou
LW	11	Patrick Estève
FH	10	Christian Delage
SH	9	Pierre Berbizier
N8	8	Jean-Luc Joinel
OF	7	Dominique Erbani
BF	6	Jean-Pierre Rives (c)
RL	5	Jean-François Imbernon
LL	4	Jean Condom
TP	3	Robert Paparemborde
HK	2	Bernard Herrero
LP	1	Pierre Dospital
Replacements:
FH		Bernard Viviès
Coach:
(France) Jacques Fouroux

1983-02-19

Scotland	15–19	Wales
Tries: Renwick; Con.: Dods; Pen.: Dods (3)		Tries: Jones; E. Rees; Con.: Wyatt; Pen.: Wyatt (3)

Murrayfield, Edinburgh
Referee: R. C. Quittenton (England)

FB	15	Peter Dods
RW	14	Keith Robertson
OC	13	Jim Renwick
IC	12	David Johnston
LW	11	Roger Baird
FH	10	Brian Gossman
SH	9	Roy Laidlaw (c)
N8	8	John Beattie
OF	7	David Leslie
BF	6	Jim Calder
RL	5	Alan Tomes
LL	4	Bill Cuthbertson
TP	3	Iain Milne
HK	2	Colin Deans
LP	1	Jim Aitken
Coach:
(Scotland) Jim Telfer

FB	15	Mark Wyatt
RW	14	Elgan Rees
OC	13	David Richards
IC	12	Rob Ackerman
LW	11	Clive Rees
FH	10	Malcolm Dacey
SH	9	Terry Holmes
N8	8	Eddie Butler (c)
OF	7	David Pickering
BF	6	Jeff Squire
RL	5	John Perkins
LL	4	Bob Norster
TP	3	Ian Eidman
HK	2	Billy James
LP	1	Staff Jones
Coach:
(Wales) John Bevan

1983-03-05

Wales	23–9	Ireland
Tries: Holmes; E. Rees; Wyatt; Con.: Wyatt; Pen.: Wyatt (3)		Pen.: Campbell (2); MacNeill

National Stadium, Cardiff
Referee: J. A. F. Trigg (England)

FB	15	Mark Wyatt
RW	14	Elgan Rees
OC	13	Rob Ackerman
IC	12	David Richards
LW	11	Clive Rees
FH	10	Malcolm Dacey
SH	9	Terry Holmes
N8	8	Eddie Butler (c)
OF	7	David Pickering
BF	6	Jeff Squire
RL	5	Bob Norster
LL	4	John Perkins
TP	3	Graham Price
HK	2	Billy James
LP	1	Staff Jones
Coach:
(Wales) John Bevan

FB	15	Hugo MacNeill
RW	14	Trevor Ringland
OC	13	David Irwin
IC	12	Mike Kiernan
LW	11	Moss Finn
FH	10	Ollie Campbell
SH	9	Robbie McGrath
N8	8	Willie Duggan
OF	7	John O'Driscoll
BF	6	Fergus Slattery
RL	5	Moss Keane
LL	4	Donal Lenihan
TP	3	Ginger McLoughlin
HK	2	Ciaran Fitzgerald (c)
LP	1	Philip Orr
Coach:
(Ireland) Willie John McBride

1983-03-05

England	12–22	Scotland
Pen.: Hare (3); Drops: Horton		Tries: Laidlaw; Smith; Con.: Dods; Pen.: Dods (3); Drops: Robertson

Twickenham, London
Referee: T. F. Doocey (New Zealand)

FB	15	Dusty Hare
RW	14	John Carleton
OC	13	Huw Davies
IC	12	Paul Dodge
LW	11	Tony Swift
FH	10	John Horton
SH	9	Steve Smith
N8	8	John Scott (c)
OF	7	Peter Winterbottom
BF	6	Nick Jeavons
RL	5	Steve Bainbridge
LL	4	Steve Boyle
TP	3	Gary Pearce
HK	2	Peter Wheeler
LP	1	Colin Smart
Coach:
(England) Dick Greenwood

FB	15	Peter Dods
RW	14	Jim Pollock
OC	13	Jim Renwick
IC	12	Keith Robertson
LW	11	Roger Baird
FH	10	John Rutherford
SH	9	Roy Laidlaw
N8	8	John Beattie
OF	7	David Leslie
BF	6	Jim Calder
RL	5	Iain Paxton
LL	4	Tom Smith
TP	3	Iain Milne
HK	2	Colin Deans
LP	1	Jim Aitken (c)
Coach:
(Scotland) Jim Telfer

1983-03-19

Ireland	25–15	England
Tries: Campbell; Slattery; Con.: Campbell; Pen.: Campbell (5)		Pen.: Hare (5)

Lansdowne Road, Dublin
Referee: J. B. Anderson (Scotland)

FB	15	Hugo MacNeill
RW	14	Trevor Ringland
OC	13	David Irwin
IC	12	Mike Kiernan
LW	11	Moss Finn
FH	10	Ollie Campbell
SH	9	Robbie McGrath
N8	8	Willie Duggan
OF	7	John O'Driscoll
BF	6	Fergus Slattery
RL	5	Moss Keane
LL	4	Donal Lenihan
TP	3	Ginger McLoughlin
HK	2	Ciaran Fitzgerald (c)
LP	1	Philip Orr
Replacements:
FH		Tony Ward
Coach:
(Ireland) Willie John McBride

FB	15	Dusty Hare
RW	14	John Carleton
OC	13	Clive Woodward
IC	12	Paul Dodge
LW	11	David Trick
FH	10	John Horton
SH	9	Nick Youngs
N8	8	John Scott (c)
OF	7	Peter Winterbottom
BF	6	Nick Jeavons
RL	5	Steve Bainbridge
LL	4	Steve Boyle
TP	3	Gary Pearce
HK	2	Peter Wheeler
LP	1	Colin Smart
Coach:
(England) Dick Greenwood

1983-03-19

France	16–9	Wales
Tries: Estève; Pen.: Blanco (3); Drops: Camberabero		Tries: Squire; Con.: Wyatt; Pen.: Evans

Parc des Princes, Paris
Attendance: 45,242
Referee: T. F. Doocey (New Zealand)

FB	15	Serge Blanco
RW	14	Philippe Sella
OC	13	Didier Codorniou
IC	12	Christian Bélascain
LW	11	Patrick Estève
FH	10	Didier Camberabero
SH	9	Gérald Martinez
N8	8	Jean-Luc Joinel
OF	7	Dominique Erbani
BF	6	Jean-Pierre Rives (c)
RL	5	Jean-François Imbernon
LL	4	Jean Condom
TP	3	Robert Paparemborde
HK	2	Philippe Dintrans
LP	1	Pierre Dospital
Coach:
(France) Jacques Fouroux

FB	15	Mark Wyatt
RW	14	Elgan Rees
OC	13	Rob Ackerman
IC	12	Gwyn Evans
LW	11	Clive Rees
FH	10	Malcolm Dacey
SH	9	Terry Holmes
N8	8	Eddie Butler (c)
OF	7	David Pickering
BF	6	Jeff Squire
RL	5	Bob Norster
LL	4	John Perkins
TP	3	Graham Price
HK	2	Billy James
LP	1	Staff Jones
Replacements:
FB		Richard Donovan
Coach:
(Wales) John Bevan
