= 1982 Five Nations Championship squads =

Rugby union competition squads

== England ==
Head coach: Mike Davis

1. Bill Beaumont (c.)
2. Phil Blakeway
3. Tony Bond
4. John Carleton
5. Maurice Colclough
6. Les Cusworth
7. Huw Davies
8. Paul Dodge
9. Dusty Hare
10. Bob Hesford
11. Nick Jeavons
12. Gary Pearce
13. Marcus Rose
14. John Scott
15. Mike Slemen
16. Colin Smart
17. Steve Smith
18. Jim Syddall
19. Peter Wheeler
20. Peter Winterbottom
21. Clive Woodward

== France ==
Head coach: Jacques Fouroux

1. Christian Bélascain
2. Serge Blanco
3. Éric Buchet
4. Manuel Carpentier
5. Michel Crémaschi
6. Philippe Dintrans
7. Pierre Dospital
8. Michel Fabre
9. Serge Gabernet
10. Jean-François Imbernon
11. Jean-Luc Joinel
12. Pierre Lacans
13. Jean-Patrick Lescarboura
14. Alain Lorieux
15. Gérard Martinez
16. Patrick Mesny
17. Robert Paparemborde
18. Laurent Pardo
19. Patrick Perrier
20. Daniel Revailler
21. Jean-Pierre Rives (c.)
22. Laurent Rodriguez
23. Marc Sallefranque
24. Jean-Paul Wolf

== Ireland ==
Head coach: Tom Kiernan

1. Ollie Campbell
2. Keith Crossan
3. Paul Dean
4. Willie Duggan
5. Moss Finn
6. Ciaran Fitzgerald (c.)
7. David Irwin
8. Moss Keane
9. Ronan Kearney
10. Michael Kiernan
11. Donal Lenihan
12. Hugo MacNeill
13. Robbie McGrath
14. Gerry McLoughlin
15. John Murphy
16. John O'Driscoll
17. Phil Orr
18. Trevor Ringland
19. Fergus Slattery

== Scotland ==
Head coach: Jim Telfer

1. Jim Aitken
2. Roger Baird
3. Jim Calder
4. Bill Cuthbertson
5. Colin Deans
6. Gordon Dickson
7. Andy Irvine (c.)
8. David Johnston
9. Roy Laidlaw
10. David Leslie
11. Iain Milne
12. Eric Paxton
13. Iain Paxton
14. Jim Renwick
15. Keith Robertson
16. John Rutherford
17. Alan Tomes
18. Derek White
19. Jim Pollock

== Wales ==
Head coach: John Lloyd

1. Rob Ackerman
2. Clive Burgess
3. Eddie Butler
4. Pat Daniels
5. Gareth Davies (c.)
6. Mark Davies
7. Alun Donovan
8. Gwyn Evans
9. Ray Gravell
10. Terry Holmes
11. Rhodri Lewis
12. Richard Moriarty
13. Bob Norster
14. Gary Pearce
15. Alan Phillips
16. Graham Price
17. Clive Rees
18. David Richards
19. Jeff Squire
20. Ian Stephens
21. Steve Sutton
22. Geoff Wheel
23. Gareth Williams
24. Gerald Williams
