= 1985 Five Nations Championship squads =

Rugby union competition squads

== England ==
Head coach: Dick Greenwood

1. Rob Andrew
2. Phil Blakeway
3. Steve Brain
4. David Cooke
5. Paul Dodge (c.)
6. Wade Dooley
7. Jon Hall
8. Richard Harding
9. Bob Hesford
10. Richard Hill
11. Chris Martin
12. Nigel Melville
13. John Orwin
14. Gary Pearce
15. Kevin Simms
16. Simon Smith
17. Mike Teague
18. Rory Underwood

== France ==
Head coach: Jacques Fouroux

1. Serge Blanco
2. Éric Bonneval
3. Didier Codorniou
4. Jean Condom
5. Philippe Dintrans (c.)
6. Pierre Dospital
7. Dominique Erbani
8. Patrick Estève
9. Jerome Gallion
10. Jean-Pierre Garuet-Lempirou
11. Jacques Gratton
12. Francis Haget
13. Jean-Luc Joinel
14. Bernard Lavigne
15. Jean-Patrick Lescarboura
16. Jean-Charles Orso
17. Laurent Pardo
18. Laurent Rodriguez
19. Philippe Sella

== Ireland ==
Head coach: Mick Doyle

1. Willie Anderson
2. Michael Bradley
3. Nigel Carr
4. Keith Crossan
5. Paul Dean
6. Ciaran Fitzgerald (c.)
7. Mick Fitzpatrick
8. Michael Kiernan
9. Donal Lenihan
10. Hugo MacNeill
11. Phillip Matthews
12. Brian McCall
13. J. J. McCoy
14. Rory Moroney
15. Brendan Mullin
16. Phil Orr
17. Trevor Ringland
18. Brian Spillane

== Scotland ==
Head coach: Derrick Grant

1. Roger Baird
2. John Beattie
3. Jim Calder
4. Alister Campbell
5. Colin Deans
6. Peter Dods
7. Gordon Hunter
8. John Jeffrey
9. Roy Laidlaw (c.)*
10. David Leslie (c.)**
11. Gerry McGuinness
12. Iain Milne
13. Keith Murray
14. Iain Paxton
15. Jim Pollock
16. Keith Robertson
17. Norrie Rowan
18. John Rutherford
19. Tom Smith
20. Peter Steven
21. Alan Tomes
22. Iwan Tukalo
23. Douglas Wyllie

* captain in the first game ** captain in the other three games

== Wales ==
Head coach: John Bevan

1. Rob Ackerman
2. Gareth Davies
3. Jonathan Davies
4. Phil Davies
5. Ian Eidman
6. Stuart Evans
7. Adrian Hadley
8. Terry Holmes (c.)
9. Kevin Hopkins
10. Billy James
11. Phil Lewis
12. Richard Moriarty
13. Martyn Morris
14. Bob Norster
15. John Perkins
16. Dai Pickering
17. Mark Ring
18. Gareth Roberts
19. Paul Thorburn
20. Mark Titley
21. Jeff Whitefoot
22. Mark Wyatt
