= 1986 Five Nations Championship squads =

Rugby union competition squads

== England ==
Head coach: Martin Green

1. Rob Andrew
2. Stuart Barnes
3. Steve Brain
4. Gareth Chilcott
5. Maurice Colclough
6. Fran Clough
7. Huw Davies
8. Wade Dooley
9. Jon Hall
10. Simon Halliday
11. Mike Harrison
12. Richard Hill
13. Nigel Melville (c.)
14. John Palmer
15. Gary Pearce
16. Nigel Redman
17. Paul Rendall
18. Dean Richards
19. Graham Robbins
20. Jamie Salmon
21. Kevin Simms
22. Simon Smith
23. Rory Underwood
24. Peter Winterbottom

== France ==
Head coach: Jacques Fouroux

1. Pierre Berbizier
2. Éric Bonneval
3. Serge Blanco
4. Pierre Chadebech
5. Denis Charvet
6. Jean Condom
7. Daniel Dubroca (c.)
8. Dominique Erbani
9. Patrick Estève
10. Jean-Pierre Garuet-Lempirou
11. Jacques Gratton
12. Francis Haget
13. Jean-Luc Joinel
14. Guy Laporte
15. Jean-Baptiste Lafond
16. Philippe Marocco
17. Philippe Sella

== Ireland ==
Head coach: Mick Doyle

1. Willie Anderson
2. Michael Bradley
3. Nigel Carr
4. Keith Crossan
5. Paul Dean
6. Moss Finn
7. Ciaran Fitzgerald (c.)
8. Des Fitzgerald
9. Jerry Holland
10. Ronan Kearney
11. Paul Kennedy
12. Ralph Keyes
13. Michael Kiernan
14. Donal Lenihan
15. Hugo MacNeill
16. Brian McCall
17. J. J. McCoy
18. Davy Morrow
19. Brendan Mullin
20. Phil Orr
21. Trevor Ringland
22. Brian Spillane
23. Tony Ward

== Scotland ==
Head coach: Derrick Grant

1. Roger Baird
2. John Beattie
3. Alex Brewster
4. Finlay Calder
5. Alister Campbell
6. Jeremy Campbell-Lamerton
7. Colin Deans (c.)
8. Matt Duncan
9. Gavin Hastings
10. Scott Hastings
11. John Jeffrey
12. David Johnston
13. Roy Laidlaw
14. Iain Milne
15. Iain Paxton
16. Keith Robertson
17. John Rutherford
18. David Sole

== Wales ==
Head coach: Tony Gray

1. Bleddyn Bowen
2. Mark Brown
3. Jonathan Davies
4. Phil Davies
5. John Devereux
6. Ian Eidman
7. Adrian Hadley
8. Billy James
9. Robert Jones
10. Phil Lewis
11. Paul Moriarty
12. John Perkins
13. Dai Pickering (c.)
14. Paul Thorburn
15. Mark Titley
16. David Waters
17. Jeff Whitefoot
