= 1985 Five Nations Championship =

1985 Rugby union tournament

- Date: 2 February - 20 April 1985
- Countries: England; Ireland; France; Scotland; Wales

Tournament statistics
- Champions: Ireland (10th title)
- Triple Crown: Ireland (6th title)
- Matches played: 10
- Tries scored: 19 (1.9 per match)
- Top point scorer: (Ireland) Michael Kiernan (42 points)
- Top try scorer: (Ireland) Trevor Ringland (3 tries)

The 1985 Five Nations Championship was the fifty-sixth series of the rugby union Five Nations Championship. Including the previous incarnations as the Home Nations and Five Nations, this was the ninety-first series of the northern hemisphere rugby union championship. Ten matches were played between 2 February and 20 April. The championship was contested by England, France, Ireland, Scotland and Wales.

The championship winner was Ireland, winning their tenth title (excluding eight other shared titles); it would prove to be their last in 24 years, until their Grand Slam in 2009. Ireland also claimed the Triple Crown, their sixth, which would be their last until 2004.

The tournament suffered three match postponements due to bad weather. The opening fixtures, Ireland v England and France v Wales, were postponed to late March and the Wales v England match was put back from February to April because of a frozen pitch in Cardiff. The rescheduled match was notable for the debut, at fly half for Wales, of Jonathan Davies.

== Participants ==
Nation	Venue	City	Head coach	Captain
England	Twickenham	London	Dick Greenwood	Paul Dodge
France	Parc des Princes	Paris	Jacques Fouroux	Philippe Dintrans
Ireland	Lansdowne Road	Dublin	Mick Doyle	Ciaran Fitzgerald
Scotland	Murrayfield	Edinburgh	Derrick Grant	Roy Laidlaw/David Leslie
Wales	National Stadium	Cardiff	John Bevan	Terry Holmes

== Table ==
Pos	Team	Pld	W	D	L	PF	PA	PD	Pts
1	Ireland	4	3	1	0	67	49	+18	7
2	France	4	2	2	0	49	30	+19	6
3	Wales	4	2	0	2	61	71	−10	4
4	England	4	1	1	2	44	53	−9	3
5	Scotland	4	0	0	4	46	64	−18	0

== Results ==
1985-02-02

England	9–9	France
Pen.: Andrew (2); Drops: Andrew	report	Drops: Lescarboura (3)

Twickenham, London
Attendance: 60,000
Referee: D. I. H. Burnett (Ireland)

1985-02-02

Scotland	15–18	Ireland
Pen.: Dods (4); Drops: Rutherford	Report	Tries: Ringland (2); Con.: Kiernan (2); Pen.: Kiernan; Drops: Kiernan

Murrayfield, Edinburgh
Referee: Steve Strydom (South Africa)

1985-02-16

France	11–3	Scotland
Tries: Blanco (2); Pen.: Lescarboura	Report	Pen.: Dods

Parc des Princes, Paris
Attendance: 45,146
Referee: L. M. Prideaux (England)

1985-03-02

Scotland	21–25	Wales
Tries: Paxton (2); Con.: Dods (2); Pen.: Dods; Drops: Rutherford (2)	Report	Tries: Pickering (2); Con.: Wyatt; Pen.: Wyatt (4); Drops: G. Davies

Murrayfield, Edinburgh
Referee: René Hourquet (France)

1985-03-02

Ireland	15–15	France
Pen.: Kiernan (5)	Report	Tries: Codorniou; Estève; Con.: Lescarboura (2); Pen.: Lescarboura

Lansdowne Road, Dublin
Attendance: 56,000
Referee: Kerry Fitzgerald (Australia)

1985-03-16

England	10–7	Scotland
Tries: S. Smith; Pen.: Andrew (2)	Report	Tries: Robertson; Pen.: Dods

Twickenham, London
Referee: C. Norling (Wales)

1985-03-16

Wales	9–21	Ireland
Tries: Lewis; Con.: Wyatt; Drops: G. Davies	Report	Tries: Crossan; Ringland; Con. Kiernan (2); Pen.: Kiernan (3)

National Stadium, Cardiff
Referee: Kerry Fitzgerald (Australia)

1985-03-30

Ireland	13–10	England
Tries: Mullin; Pen.: Kiernan (2); Drops: Kiernan	Report	Tries: R. Underwood; Pen.: Andrew (2)

Lansdowne Road, Dublin
Referee: J. M. Fleming (Scotland)

1985-03-30

France	14–3	Wales
Tries: Estève; Gallion; Pen.: Lescarboura (2)	Report	Pen.: Thorburn

Parc des Princes, Paris
Attendance: 49,164
Referee: Steve Strydom (South Africa)

1985-04-20

Wales	24–15	England
Tries: J. Davies; Roberts; Con.: Thorburn (2); Pen.: Thorburn (3); Drops: J. Davies	Report	Tries: S. Smith; Con.: Andrew; Pen.: Andrew (2); Drops: Andrew

National Stadium, Cardiff
Referee: F. Palmade (France)
