= History of rugby union matches between France and Scotland =

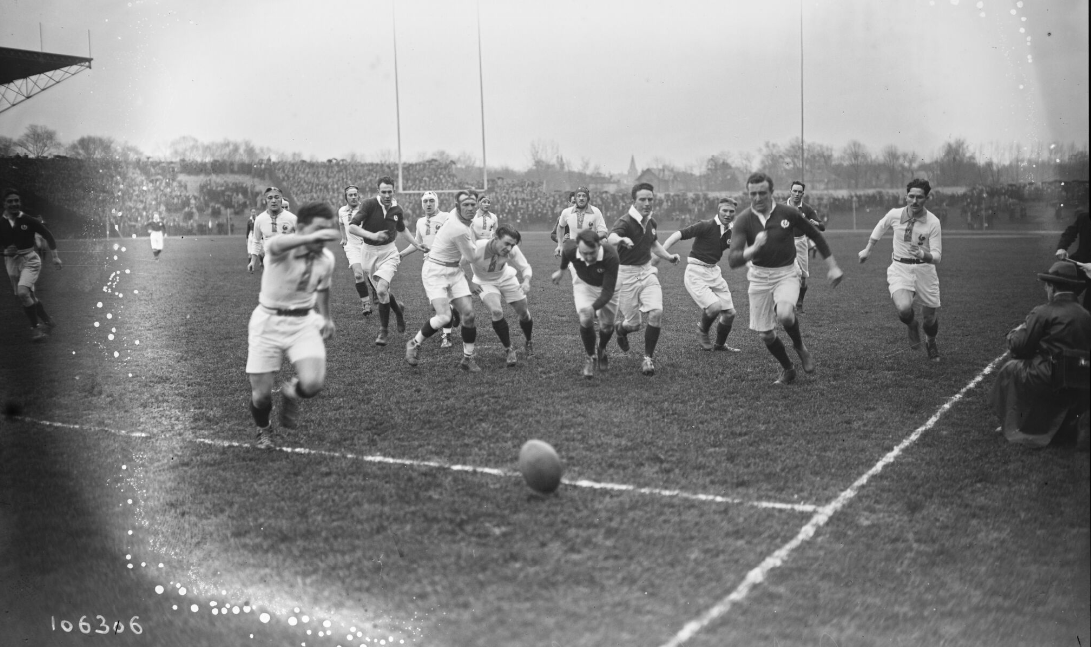
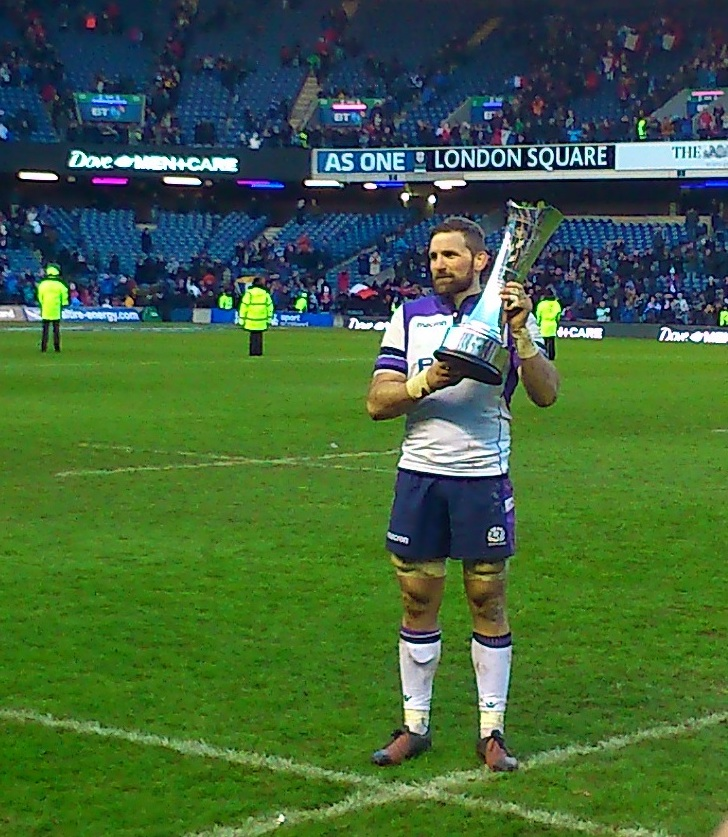
1926 Five Nations Championship meeting; Scotland captain John Barclay holding the Auld Alliance Trophy.

The history of rugby union matches between France and Scotland dates back to 1910 when the two teams played against each other in Edinburgh. Scotland won the match 27–0. Since then there have been a total of 105 games played, resulting in 61 wins for France, 41 wins for Scotland and 3 draws, as of March 2026.

During rugby union's amateur era, the overall history of the fixture was relatively even – up to the end of the 1995 Rugby World Cup the sides had met 67 times with France winning 33 games and Scotland 31. Since then there has been a marked shift in favour of France, who have won 28 of the 38 matches between the teams since 1996.

Scotland and France play each other at least once a year, as both participate in the Six Nations Championship, and its predecessor competitions. In 2018 a new trophy, the Auld Alliance Trophy, was inaugurated to be presented to the winner of the Six Nations fixture each year. Apart from their annual match, currently part of the Six Nations Championship, the teams have also met in five warm-up matches prior to the 2015, 2019 and 2023 World Cups, with France winning on three occasions and Scotland two.

== Summary ==
=== Overall ===
Details	Played	Won by France	Won by Scotland	Drawn	France points	Scotland points
In France	51	38	12	1	876	584
In Scotland	51	21	29	1	708	790
Neutral venue	3	2	0	1	93	48
Overall	105	61	41	3	1,677	1,422

=== Records ===
Note: Date shown in brackets indicates when the record was or last set.

Record	France	Scotland
Longest winning streak	10 (17 March 2007 – 13 March 2016)	5 (21 February 1925 – 1 January 1930)
Largest points for
Home	47 (15 March 1997)	50 (7 March 2026)
Away	51 (25 October 2003)	36 (10 April 1999)
Largest winning margin
Home	35 (23 February 2003)	28 (20 January 1912)
Away	42 (25 October 2003)	18 (1 January 1913)

== Breakdown ==
Five Nations Championship results (1910–1999)
Team	Wins	W%
France	34	49.28
Scotland	33	47.83
Draws	2	—N/a
Total	69	

Six Nations Championship results (2000–present)
Team	Wins	W%
France	21	77.78
Scotland	6	22.22
Draws	—N/a	
Total	27	

At the Rugby World Cup (RWC), the two teams have played each other on three occasions: the first edition (1987) in Pool 4, hosted by New Zealand; the first (and thus far only) RWC played in South Africa (1995); and finally the 2003 Rugby World Cup played in Australia. The first encounter, in 1987, was a draw (20–20). And in fact was the only draw for that RWC. The second RWC encounter was a close game, with France coming out victorious, 22–19. The third and final encounter was in the 2003 RWC. However, unlike the previous two fixtures, the result was a blowout. France won by forty-two points and kept Scotland try-less. All fixtures were played in the pool stage of the tournament. In all cases France would eventuate into the semi-finals of the tournament. In total France scored ninety-three points against Scotland at the RWC; Scotland forty-eight.

In the Five Nations Championship (1910–1999), France and Scotland played on sixty-nine occasions, France edging the two teams' encounters thirty-four to thirty-three (two matches being drawn). Overall in these matches, France scored 756 points, and Scotland 819.

In the Six Nations Championship (2000–present), the two sides have met twenty-seven times. France have won the duel twenty-one times, with Scotland only having won against France six times in the competition. In these matches, France have scored 579 points; Scotland 396.

Starting in 2015 France and Scotland have played a one- or two-test warm-up fixture in the lead up to the Rugby World Cup. With the exception of the first meeting in 2019 all encounters have been very close results. However France hold the lead again in these instances, having won three of the five meetings.

== Results ==
The matches played between France and Scotland are:

No.	Date	Venue	Score	Winner	Comments
1	22 January 1910	Inverleith, Edinburgh	27–0	Scotland	1910 Five Nations Championship
2	2 January 1911	Stade Yves-du-Manoir, Colombes	16–15	France	1911 Five Nations Championship
3	20 January 1912	Inverleith, Edinburgh	31–3	Scotland	1912 Five Nations Championship
4	1 January 1913	Parc des Princes, Paris	3–21	Scotland	1913 Five Nations Championship
5	1 January 1920	Parc des Princes, Paris	0–5	Scotland	1920 Five Nations Championship (Note: The 1920 Five Nations Championship was known in France as "Le match des borgnes" (The one-eyed match) because five players between the two sides had lost an eye in World War I.)
6	22 January 1921	Inverleith, Edinburgh	0–3	France	1921 Five Nations Championship
7	2 January 1922	Stade Yves-du-Manoir, Colombes	3–3	draw	1922 Five Nations Championship
8	20 January 1923	Inverleith, Edinburgh	16–3	Scotland	1923 Five Nations Championship
9	1 January 1924	Stade Pershing, Vincennes	12–10	France	1924 Five Nations Championship
10	21 February 1925	Inverleith, Edinburgh	25–4	Scotland	1925 Five Nations Championship
11	2 January 1926	Stade Yves-du-Manoir, Colombes	6–20	Scotland	1926 Five Nations Championship
12	22 January 1927	Murrayfield Stadium, Edinburgh	23–6	Scotland	1927 Five Nations Championship
13	2 January 1928	Stade Yves-du-Manoir, Colombes	6–15	Scotland	1928 Five Nations Championship
14	19 January 1929	Murrayfield Stadium, Edinburgh	6–3	Scotland	1929 Five Nations Championship
15	1 January 1930	Stade Yves-du-Manoir, Colombes	7–3	France	1930 Five Nations Championship
16	24 January 1931	Murrayfield Stadium, Edinburgh	6–4	Scotland	1931 Five Nations Championship
17	1 January 1947	Stade Yves-du-Manoir, Colombes	8–3	France	1947 Five Nations Championship
18	21 February 1948	Murrayfield Stadium, Edinburgh	9–8	Scotland	1948 Five Nations Championship
19	15 January 1949	Stade Yves-du-Manoir, Colombes	0–8	Scotland	1949 Five Nations Championship
20	14 January 1950	Murrayfield Stadium, Edinburgh	8–5	Scotland	1950 Five Nations Championship
21	13 January 1951	Stade Yves-du-Manoir, Colombes	14–12	France	1951 Five Nations Championship
22	12 January 1952	Murrayfield Stadium, Edinburgh	11–13	France	1952 Five Nations Championship
23	10 January 1953	Stade Yves-du-Manoir, Colombes	11–5	France	1953 Five Nations Championship
24	9 January 1954	Murrayfield Stadium, Edinburgh	0–3	France	1954 Five Nations Championship
25	8 January 1955	Stade Yves-du-Manoir, Colombes	15–0	France	1955 Five Nations Championship
26	14 January 1956	Murrayfield Stadium, Edinburgh	12–0	Scotland	1956 Five Nations Championship
27	12 January 1957	Stade Yves-du-Manoir, Colombes	0–6	Scotland	1957 Five Nations Championship
28	11 January 1958	Murrayfield Stadium, Edinburgh	11–9	Scotland	1958 Five Nations Championship
29	10 January 1959	Stade Yves-du-Manoir, Colombes	9–0	France	1959 Five Nations Championship
30	9 January 1960	Murrayfield Stadium, Edinburgh	11–13	France	1960 Five Nations Championship
31	7 January 1961	Stade Yves-du-Manoir, Colombes	11–0	France	1961 Five Nations Championship
32	13 January 1962	Murrayfield Stadium, Edinburgh	3–11	France	1962 Five Nations Championship
33	12 January 1963	Stade Yves-du-Manoir, Colombes	6–11	Scotland	1963 Five Nations Championship
34	4 January 1964	Murrayfield Stadium, Edinburgh	10–0	Scotland	1964 Five Nations Championship
35	9 January 1965	Stade Yves-du-Manoir, Colombes	16–8	France	1965 Five Nations Championship
36	15 January 1966	Murrayfield Stadium, Edinburgh	3–3	draw	1966 Five Nations Championship
37	14 January 1967	Stade Yves-du-Manoir, Colombes	8–9	Scotland	1967 Five Nations Championship
38	13 January 1968	Murrayfield Stadium, Edinburgh	6–8	France	1968 Five Nations Championship
39	11 January 1969	Stade Yves-du-Manoir, Colombes	3–6	Scotland	1969 Five Nations Championship
40	10 January 1970	Murrayfield Stadium, Edinburgh	9–11	France	1970 Five Nations Championship
41	16 January 1971	Stade Yves-du-Manoir, Colombes	13–8	France	1971 Five Nations Championship
42	15 January 1972	Murrayfield Stadium, Edinburgh	20–9	Scotland	1972 Five Nations Championship
43	13 January 1973	Parc des Princes, Paris	16–13	France	1973 Five Nations Championship
44	16 March 1974	Murrayfield Stadium, Edinburgh	19–6	Scotland	1974 Five Nations Championship
45	15 February 1975	Parc des Princes, Paris	10–9	France	1975 Five Nations Championship
46	10 January 1976	Murrayfield Stadium, Edinburgh	6–13	France	1976 Five Nations Championship
47	5 March 1977	Parc des Princes, Paris	23–3	France	1977 Five Nations Championship
48	4 February 1978	Murrayfield Stadium, Edinburgh	16–19	France	1978 Five Nations Championship
49	17 March 1979	Parc des Princes, Paris	21–17	France	1979 Five Nations Championship
50	16 February 1980	Murrayfield Stadium, Edinburgh	22–14	Scotland	1980 Five Nations Championship
51	17 January 1981	Parc des Princes, Paris	16–9	France	1981 Five Nations Championship
52	6 March 1982	Murrayfield Stadium, Edinburgh	16–7	Scotland	1982 Five Nations Championship
53	5 February 1983	Parc des Princes, Paris	19–15	France	1983 Five Nations Championship
54	17 March 1984	Murrayfield Stadium, Edinburgh	21–12	Scotland	1984 Five Nations Championship
55	16 February 1985	Parc des Princes, Paris	11–3	France	1985 Five Nations Championship
56	18 January 1986	Murrayfield Stadium, Edinburgh	18–17	Scotland	1986 Five Nations Championship
57	7 March 1987	Parc des Princes, Paris	28–22	France	1987 Five Nations Championship
58	23 May 1987	Lancaster Park, Christchurch (New Zealand)	20–20	draw	1987 Rugby World Cup
59	6 February 1988	Murrayfield Stadium, Edinburgh	23–12	Scotland	1988 Five Nations Championship
60	18 March 1989	Parc des Princes, Paris	19–3	France	1989 Five Nations Championship
61	17 February 1990	Murrayfield Stadium, Edinburgh	21–0	Scotland	1990 Five Nations Championship
62	19 January 1991	Parc des Princes, Paris	15–9	France	1991 Five Nations Championship
63	7 March 1992	Murrayfield Stadium, Edinburgh	10–6	Scotland	1992 Five Nations Championship
64	6 February 1993	Parc des Princes, Paris	11–3	France	1993 Five Nations Championship
65	19 March 1994	Murrayfield Stadium, Edinburgh	12–20	France	1994 Five Nations Championship
66	18 February 1995	Parc des Princes, Paris	21–23	Scotland	1995 Five Nations Championship
67	3 June 1995	Loftus Versfeld, Pretoria (South Africa)	22–19	France	1995 Rugby World Cup
68	3 February 1996	Murrayfield Stadium, Edinburgh	19–14	Scotland	1996 Five Nations Championship
69	15 March 1997	Parc des Princes, Paris	47–20	France	1997 Five Nations Championship
70	21 February 1998	Murrayfield Stadium, Edinburgh	16–51	France	1998 Five Nations Championship
71	10 April 1999	Stade de France, Saint-Denis	22–36	Scotland	1999 Five Nations Championship
72	4 March 2000	Murrayfield Stadium, Edinburgh	16–28	France	2000 Six Nations Championship
73	4 February 2001	Stade de France, Saint-Denis	16–6	France	2001 Six Nations Championship
74	22 March 2002	Murrayfield Stadium, Edinburgh	10–22	France	2002 Six Nations Championship
75	23 February 2003	Stade de France, Saint-Denis	38–3	France	2003 Six Nations Championship
76	25 October 2003	Stadium Australia, Sydney (Australia)	51–9	France	2003 Rugby World Cup
77	21 March 2004	Murrayfield Stadium, Edinburgh	0–31	France	2004 Six Nations Championship
78	5 March 2005	Stade de France, Saint-Denis	16–9	France	2005 Six Nations Championship
79	5 February 2006	Murrayfield Stadium, Edinburgh	20–16	Scotland	2006 Six Nations Championship
80	17 March 2007	Stade de France, Saint-Denis	46–19	France	2007 Six Nations Championship
81	3 February 2008	Murrayfield Stadium, Edinburgh	6–27	France	2008 Six Nations Championship
82	14 February 2009	Stade de France, Saint-Denis	22–13	France	2009 Six Nations Championship
83	7 February 2010	Murrayfield Stadium, Edinburgh	9–18	France	2010 Six Nations Championship
84	5 February 2011	Stade de France, Saint-Denis	34–21	France	2011 Six Nations Championship
85	26 February 2012	Murrayfield Stadium, Edinburgh	17–23	France	2012 Six Nations Championship
86	16 March 2013	Stade de France, Saint-Denis	23–16	France	2013 Six Nations Championship
87	8 March 2014	Murrayfield Stadium, Edinburgh	17–19	France	2014 Six Nations Championship
88	7 February 2015	Stade de France, Saint-Denis	15–8	France	2015 Six Nations Championship
89	5 September 2015	Stade de France, Saint-Denis	19–16	France	2015 Rugby World Cup warm-up match
90	13 March 2016	Murrayfield Stadium, Edinburgh	29–18	Scotland	2016 Six Nations Championship
91	12 February 2017	Stade de France, Saint-Denis	22–16	France	2017 Six Nations Championship
92	11 February 2018	Murrayfield Stadium, Edinburgh	32–26	Scotland	2018 Six Nations Championship
93	23 February 2019	Stade de France, Saint-Denis	27–10	France	2019 Six Nations Championship
94	17 August 2019	Allianz Riviera, Nice	32–3	France	2019 Rugby World Cup warm-up match
95	24 August 2019	Murrayfield Stadium, Edinburgh	17–14	Scotland	2019 Rugby World Cup warm-up match
96	8 March 2020	Murrayfield Stadium, Edinburgh	28–17	Scotland	2020 Six Nations Championship
97	22 November 2020	Murrayfield Stadium, Edinburgh	15–22	France	Autumn Nations Cup
98	26 March 2021	Stade de France, Saint-Denis	23–27	Scotland	2021 Six Nations Championship
99	26 February 2022	Murrayfield Stadium, Edinburgh	17–36	France	2022 Six Nations Championship
100	26 February 2023	Stade de France, Saint-Denis	32–21	France	2023 Six Nations Championship
101	5 August 2023	Murrayfield Stadium, Edinburgh	25–21	Scotland	2023 Rugby World Cup warm-up match
102	12 August 2023	Stade Geoffroy-Guichard, Saint-Étienne	30–27	France	2023 Rugby World Cup warm-up match
103	10 February 2024	Murrayfield Stadium, Edinburgh	16–20	France	2024 Six Nations Championship
104	15 March 2025	Stade de France, Saint-Denis	35–16	France	2025 Six Nations Championship
105	7 March 2026	Murrayfield Stadium, Edinburgh	50–40	Scotland	2026 Six Nations Championship
