= 1981–82 French Rugby Union Championship =

French Rugby Championship 1981–82
- Countries: France
- Number of teams: Group A : 40 teams Group B : 40 teams
- Champions: Agen (7th title); Group B : Aire-sur-Adour
- Runners-up: Bayonne; Group B : Bourgoin

The 1981–82 French Rugby Union Championship was won by Agen, beating Bayonne in the final.

The group B was won by Avenir Aturin (from Aire-sur-Adour) beating Bourgoin in the final.

== Formula ==
For the third time, the clubs of the "Group B" didn't participate for the title, but played a proper championship.

In both group the two better of each pool were admitted directly to "last 16" round of knockout stage, while the classified from 3rd to 6th of each pool were admitted to a barrage.

== Group A ==
=== Qualification round ===
The teams are listed as the ranking, in bold the teams admitted directly to "last 16" round.

=== Pool A ===
- **Bayonne**
- **Béziers**
- RRC Nice
- Brive
- La Voulte
- Biarritz
- Touloun
- Castres
- Oloron
- Avignon Saint-Saturnin

=== Pool C ===
- **Dax**
- **Agen**
- Lourdes
- Narbonne
- Bègles
- Boucau
- Albi
- Montauban
- Valence
- Mazamet

=== Pool B ===
- **Grenoble**
- **Stadoceste**
- Aurillac
- La Rochelle
- Carcassonne
- Romans
- Stade Bagnérais
- US Bressane
- Mont-de-Marsan
- Thuir (Thuir)

=== Pool D ===
- **Angoulême**
- **Perpignan**
- Pau
- Toulouse
- Graulhet
- Montferrand
- Tulle
- Tyrosse
- Nîmes
- Périgueux

=== Barrage ===
In bold the clubs qualified for the next round

Team 1	Team 2	Results
**Pau**	Montferrand	18-16
Toulose	**Narbonne**	12-19
Boucau	**Aurillac**	13-15
Graulhet	**Bègles**	3-25
Romans	**Brive**	9-12
**Carcassonne**	RRC Nice	13-11
**La Voulte**	La Rochelle	22-18
**Lourdes**	Biarritz	24-12

=== "Last 16" ===
In bold the clubs qualified for the next round. For the first time was played with home/away basis.

Remark that the clubs coming from barrage was all eliminated.

Team 1	Team 2	1st match	2nd match
Agen	Pau	15-10	9-12
Narbonne	Angoulême	15-18	24-17
Perpignan	Aurillac	16-18	15-9
Dax	Bègles	6-10	15-6
Bayonne	Brive	23-9	12-22
Stadoceste	Carcassonne	18-3	9-9
Grenoble	La Voulte	13-10	14-6
Lourdes	Béziers	9-6	6-7

=== Quarter of finals ===
In bold the clubs qualified for the next round. (Single match knockout)

Team 1	Team 2	Results
**Agen**	Narbonne	**35-6**
**Perpignan**	Dax	**33-23**
**Bayonne**	Stadoceste	**13-6**
**Grenoble**	Lourdes	**12-9**

=== Semifinals ===
Team 1	Team 2	Results
**Agen**	Perpignan	**15-4**
**Bayonne**	Grenoble	**20-3**

== Final ==
Teams	Agen - Bayonne
Score	18-09
Date	29 May 1982
Venue	Parc des Princes, Paris
Referee	Christian Garino
Line-up
Agen	Jean-Louis Tolot, Jean-Louis Dupont, Daniel Dubroca, Charles Nieucel, Patrick Pujade, Jacques Gratton, Christian Béguerie, Dominique Erbani, Joël Llop, Christian Delage, Bernard Lavigne, Philippe Mothe, Philippe Sella, Jacques Lacroix, Bernard Viviès; Replacements : Bernard Rivière, Bruno Tolot, Patrick Sole, Patrick Mazzer, Claude Bonnet, Jean-Michel Renaud, Éric Saphy
Bayonne	Pierre Dospital, Dominique Sagarzazu, Jean Garat, Daniel Barnebougle, Michel Guilleton, Pierre Destandau, Roland Pétrissans, Arnaud Gastambide, Pierre Pucheu, Pierre Alvarez, Laurent Pardo, Christian Bélascain, Patrick Perrier, Michel Paredon, Claude Uthurrisq; Replacements : Alain Villacampa, Yves Cedarry, Christian Lembure, Louis Galdos, Alain Peyrelongue, Jean-Louis Pontacq
Scorers
Agen	4 tries Dupont, Sella, Mothe and Lacroix, 1 conversion Mothe
Bayonne	3 penalties Uthurrisq

Agen won the 7th Bouclier de Brennus, after the last victory in 1976.

== Group B ==
Teams	Avenir Aturin – Bourgoin
Score	16-15
Venue	Montpellier
