= 1986 Five Nations Championship =

1986 Rugby union tournament

- Date: 18 January - 15 March 1986
- Countries: England; Ireland; France; Scotland; Wales

Tournament statistics
- Champions: France and Scotland
- Matches played: 10
- Tries scored: 34 (3.4 per match)
- Top point scorer: (Scotland) Gavin Hastings (53 points)
- Top try scorer: (France) Philippe Sella (4 tries)

The 1986 Five Nations Championship was the fifty-seventh series of the rugby union Five Nations Championship. Including the previous incarnations as the Home Nations and Five Nations, this was the ninety-second series of the northern hemisphere rugby union championship. Ten matches were played over five weekends between 18 January and 15 March.

France and Scotland shared the title. Phillipe Sella of France scored a try in every match, repeating the feat achieved three years earlier by fellow Frenchman Patrick Estève.

This championship marked a turnaround in the fortunes of the Irish team who won the competition the previous year, but took home the wooden spoon.

== Participants ==
Nation	Venue	City	Head coach	Captain
England	Twickenham	London	Martin Green	Nigel Melville
France	Parc des Princes	Paris	Jacques Fouroux	Daniel Dubroca
Ireland	Lansdowne Road	Dublin	Mick Doyle	Ciaran Fitzgerald
Scotland	Murrayfield	Edinburgh	Derrick Grant	Colin Deans
Wales	National Stadium	Cardiff	Tony Gray	Dai Pickering

== Table ==
Pos	Team	Pld	W	D	L	PF	PA	PD	Pts
1	France	4	3	0	1	98	52	+46	6
1	Scotland	4	3	0	1	76	54	+22	6
3	Wales	4	2	0	2	74	71	+3	4
3	England	4	2	0	2	62	100	−38	4
5	Ireland	4	0	0	4	50	83	−33	0

== Results ==
1986-01-18

England	21–18	Wales
Pen.: Andrew (6); Drops: Andrew		Tries: Bowen; Con.: Thorburn; Pen.: Thorburn (3); Drops: J. Davies

Twickenham, London
Referee: R. J. Fordham (Australia)

1986-01-18

Scotland	18–17	France
Pen.: G. Hastings (6)		Tries: Berbizier; Sella; Pen.: G. Laporte (2); Drops: G. Laporte

Murrayfield, Edinburgh
Attendance: 60,000
Referee: D. I. H. Burnett (Ireland)

1986-02-01

France	29–9	Ireland
Tries: Berbizier; Marocco; Sella; Con.: G. Laporte; Pen.: Blanco; G. Laporte (3); Drops: Lafond		Pen.: Kiernan (3)

Parc des Princes, Paris
Attendance: 49,238
Referee: R. J. Fordham (Australia)

1986-02-01

Wales	22–15	Scotland
Tries: Hadley; Pen.: Thorburn (5); Drops: J. Davies		Tries: Duncan; G. Hastings; Jeffrey; Pen.: G. Hastings

National Stadium, Cardiff
Referee: R. C. Francis (New Zealand)

1986-02-15

Ireland	12–19	Wales
Tries: Ringland; Con.: Kiernan; Pen.: Kiernan (2)		Tries: Ph. Davies; Lewis; Con.: Thorburn; Pen.: Thorburn (3)

Lansdowne Road, Dublin
Referee: F. A. Howard (England)

1986-02-15

Scotland	33–6	England
Tries: Duncan; S. Hastings; Rutherford; Con.: G. Hastings (3); Pen.: G. Hastings (5)		Pen.: Andrew (2)

Murrayfield, Edinburgh
Referee: R. C. Francis (New Zealand)

1986-03-01

England	25–20	Ireland
Tries: H. Davies; Richards (2) penalty try Con.: Andrew (3); Pen.: Andrew		Tries: McCall; Mullin; Ringland; Con.: Kiernan; Pen.: Kiernan (2)

Twickenham, London
Referee: C. Norling (Wales)

1986-03-01

Wales	15–23	France
Pen.: Thorburn (5)		Tries: Blanco; Lafond (2); Sella; Con.: G. Laporte (2); Drops: G. Laporte

National Stadium, Cardiff
Attendance: 58,000
Referee: J. B. Anderson (Scotland)

1986-03-15

France	29–10	England
Tries: Blanco; G. Laporte; Sella penalty try Con.: G. Laporte (2); Pen.: G. Laporte (3)		Tries: Dooley; Pen.: Barnes (2)

Parc des Princes, Paris
Attendance: 49,238
Referee: W. D. Bevan (Wales)

1986-03-15

Ireland	9–10	Scotland
Tries: Ringland; Con.: Kiernan; Pen.: Kiernan		Tries: Laidlaw; Pen.: G. Hastings (2)

Lansdowne Road, Dublin
Referee: F. Palmade (France)

== See also ==
- Five Nations XV v Overseas Unions XV
