= Colin Smart =

England international rugby union player

- Born: Colin Edward Smart; 5 March 1950 (age 76) London, England
- School: The Skinners' School
- University: Cardiff College of Education
- Occupation: Teacher

Rugby union career
- Position: Prop
Youth career
- Tunbridge Wells
Senior career
Years	Team	Apps	(Points)
- Tunbridge Wells
1973-1983	Newport	306	(60)
International career
Years	Team	Apps	(Points)
- Wales Students
- England U-23s
1979-1983	England	17	(0)

Colin Edward Smart (born 5 March 1950) is a former international rugby union player, who played as a prop, from Highbury, London, England.

== Personal life ==
Smart was educated at The Skinners' School in Royal Tunbridge Wells, Kent. From there he attended Cardiff College of Education and became a teacher at Hartridge High School in Newport. He is married.

== Newport RFC ==
After starting his playing career captaining Tunbridge Wells RFC, Smart moved to Newport RFC in 1973. He was made captain in 1975, the club's centenary year, only the third time an Englishman had captained the club in its hundred-year history. Newport maintained their challenge for the Welsh Unofficial Championship right up to the end of the 1975–76 season only to lose out to Pontypridd. They also lost narrowly to Australia in January by 13–7. Smart led from the front, playing in 47 of the 49 games.

During the 1976–77 season, Newport won the Cardiff Centenary Sevens beating the Barbarians in the final. Only 2 defeats from 22 matches saw Newport head the Welsh Unofficial Championship, however, with a number of defeats in the second half of the season Newport had to be content with the runners-up position for the second season running. However, on 30 April 1977, Newport defeated rivals Cardiff in their Welsh Cup Final, and Smart lifted the cup at Cardiff Arms Park.

In the 1977–78 season, Smart led Newport to the Welsh Cup Final for the second year running but Newport lost 13–9 to Swansea at Cardiff Arms Park. Smart stepped down as captain after the match.

Smart continued playing for Newport until his retirement from rugby. He played for Newport against the touring All Blacks in 1982, finally stepping down from both international and club rugby at the end of the season in 1983.

== International career ==
=== Wales or England? ===
Having previously played for both the Wales Student team, and the England Under-23 side, Smart's international career could have taken him in either direction. Smart was initially offered a chance to play for Wales against New Zealand in 1974. This was a Welsh squad that included many of the players, J. P. R. Williams, Gareth Edwards, Phil Bennett, central to the only British and Irish Lions team to have ever defeated the All Blacks at home in 1971. He turned down the invitation, deciding instead to accept his first trial for the England the following month. While he was not selected for England on this occasion, Smart was selected by London Counties to play against Australia, in November 1975. Smart was finally called up to the full England team in 1979, making his debut at Twickenham Stadium against France. He then went on to appear 17 times for England, making his last appearance for England at Lansdowne Road against Ireland in 1983.

=== 1979 Far East Tour ===
Following his debut in the Five Nations Championship, Smart was selected for England's Far East Tour in May, 1979 under the captaincy of Bill Beaumont. He played in two of the Test matches, defeating Japan 21:19 in Osaka, and Fiji 29:7 in Suva. It was during the Japanese leg of this tour, which coincided with one of the three great Sumo Wrestling festivals of the year, that his team-mate John Scott first named Colin "Sumo" Smart and his younger, regular, front row 'tight-head' partner Gary Pearce "Baby Sumo", nicknames that stuck within the England camp for the rest of their careers.

=== 1981 Five Nations Championship ===
Smart missed out on the England team's victorious 1980 Grand Slam, his number one jersey being taken by the three-time British Lions forward Fran Cotton. However, when Fran Cotton retired, Smart was recalled to the England team. He played in three of the 1981 Five Nations Championship games alongside Phil Blakeway at tighthead and Peter Wheeler at hooker, with England winning against Scotland and Wales, before losing to France in the final match at Twickenham. The French, under the captaincy of Jean-Pierre Rives and featuring a young Serge Blanco in his first international season, won 16 to 12, to complete the Grand Slam.

=== 1981 Argentina Tour ===
With Phil Blakeway and Peter Wheeler unable to travel, Smart resumed his front row partnership with Gary Pearce on the 1981 tour to Argentina, with the rooky Steve Mills at hooker. This front row partnership proved successful as England carried the test series, following a 19:19 draw with a 12:6 win in the deciding match.

=== 1982 Five Nations Championship ===
Smart started all four games in the 1982 Five Nations Championship with a draw against Scotland, a narrow loss against Ireland, and wins against France and Wales leaving England as runners-up to Ireland. Later in the year Smart also played in the 60:19 win over the Fiji touring side at Twickenham.

=== "The Aftershave Incident" ===
Smart is remembered for the infamous "Aftershave Incident" in 1982. While in Paris, after beating France in the Five Nations, England teammate Maurice Colclough emptied a bottle of free aftershave from the after-match meal, filled it with wine, and drank from it. Thinking that Colclough had drunk the aftershave and not wanting to appear upstaged by his teammate, Smart drank his bottle of aftershave. This made him very ill and he was required to go to hospital to have his stomach pumped. The incident was alluded to a month later, after England had beaten Wales, by Steve Smith who quipped: "The aftershave will sure taste good tonight!"

=== 1983 Five Nations Championship ===
As in 1982 Smart played every minute of the Five Nations' matches England participated in, though it ended up being a far less successful Championship than the previous four years. England lost to France, Scotland and Ireland, and only managed a draw against Wales.
