= 1982 Five Nations Championship =

1982 Rugby union tournament

- Date: 16 January - 20 March 1982
- Countries: England; Ireland; France; Scotland; Wales

Tournament statistics
- Champions: Ireland (9th title)
- Triple Crown: Ireland (5th title)
- Matches played: 10
- Tries scored: 25 (2.5 per match)
- Top point scorer: (Ireland) Ollie Campbell (46)
- Top try scorers: (France) Serge Blanco (2) (England) John Carleton (2) (England) Mike Slemen (2) (Scotland) John Rutherford (2) (Wales) Terry Holmes (2) (Ireland) Moss Finn (2)

The 1982 Five Nations Championship was the fifty-third series of the rugby union Five Nations Championship. Including the previous incarnations as the Home Nations and Five Nations, this was the eighty-eighth series of the northern hemisphere rugby union championship. Ten matches were played between 16 January and 20 March. The winner of the championship was Ireland, with three wins and one defeat. It was the team's ninth title (excluding seven previous other titles which were shared). Ireland also won the Triple Crown, its fifth such honour, its first since 1949 and last one until 1985. The team's only defeat came on the final day of the competition, losing 22-9 to France in Paris, denying the Irish what would have been only their second ever Grand Slam.

Wales's defeat by Scotland was their first loss at home in a Five Nations championship match since France won at Cardiff in March 1968.

The Ireland vs Wales game was delayed by a week due to a frozen pitch in Dublin.

== Participants ==
The teams involved were:

Nation	Venue	City	Head coach	Captain
England	Twickenham	London	Mike Davis	Bill Beaumont
France	Parc des Princes	Paris	Jacques Fouroux	Jean-Pierre Rives
Ireland	Lansdowne Road	Dublin	Tom Kiernan	Ciaran Fitzgerald/Willie Duggan
Scotland	Murrayfield	Edinburgh	Jim Telfer	Andy Irvine
Wales	National Stadium	Cardiff	John Lloyd	Gareth Davies

== Table ==
Pos	Team	Pld	W	D	L	PF	PA	PD	Pts
1	Ireland	4	3	0	1	66	61	+5	6
2	England	4	2	1	1	68	47	+21	5
2	Scotland	4	2	1	1	71	55	+16	5
4	France	4	1	0	3	56	74	−18	2
4	Wales	4	1	0	3	59	83	−24	2

== Results ==
1982-01-16

Scotland	9–9	England
Pen.: Irvine (2); Drops: Rutherford		Pen.: Dodge (2); Rose

Murrayfield, Edinburgh
Referee: K. Rowland (Wales)

1982-01-23

Ireland	20–12	Wales
Tries: Finn (2); Ringland; Con.: Campbell; Pen.: Campbell (2)		Tries: Holmes; Con.: Evans; Pen.: Evans; Drops: Pearce

Lansdowne Road, Dublin
Referee: J. A. Short (Scotland)

1982-02-06

Wales	22–12	France
Tries: Holmes; Pen.: Evans (6)		Tries: Blanco; Con.: Sallefranque; Pen.: Martinez; Sallefranque

National Stadium, Cardiff
Attendance: 55,000
Referee: D. I. H. Burnett (Ireland)

1982-02-06

England	15–16	Ireland
Tries: Slemen; Con.: Rose; Pen.: Rose (3)		Tries: McLoughlin; MacNeill; Con.: Campbell; Pen.: Campbell (2)

Twickenham, London
Referee: Alan Hosie (Scotland)

1982-02-20

France	15–27	England
Tries: Pardo; Con.: Sallefranque; Pen.: Sallefranque (2); Drops: Lescarboura		Tries: Carleton; Woodward; Con.: Hare (2); Pen.: Hare (5)

Parc des Princes, Paris
Attendance: 45,000
Referee: M. D. M. Rea (Ireland)

1982-02-20

Ireland	21–12	Scotland
Pen.: Campbell (6); Drops: Campbell		Tries: Rutherford; Con.: Irvine; Pen.: Renwick (2)

Lansdowne Road, Dublin
Referee: Clive Norling (Wales)

1982-03-06

England	17–7	Wales
Tries: Carleton; Slemen; Pen.: Hare (3)		Tries: Lewis; Drops: Davies

Twickenham, London
Referee: F. Palmade (France)

1982-03-06

Scotland	16–7	France
Tries: Rutherford; Pen.: Irvine (3); Drops: Renwick		Tries: Rives; Pen.: Sallefranque

Murrayfield, Edinburgh
Attendance: 70,000
Referee: J. A. F. Trigg (England)

1982-03-20

France	22–9	Ireland
Tries: Blanco; Mesny; Con.: Gabernet; Pen.: Blanco (2); Gabernet (2)		Pen.: Campbell (3)

Parc des Princes, Paris
Attendance: 45,238
Referee: A. Welsby (England)

1982-03-20

Wales	18–34	Scotland
Tries: Butler; Con.: Evans; Pen.: Evans (4)		Tries: Calder; Johnston; Pollock; Renwick; White; Con.: Irvine (4); Drops: Renwick; Rutherford

National Stadium, Cardiff
Referee: J. P. Bonnet (France)
