= Faudoas =

- Commune
- Coat of arms
- Location of Faudoas
- Location within France Location within Occitanie
- Coordinates: 43°49′30″N 0°57′32″E
- Country: France
- Region: Occitania
- Department: Tarn-et-Garonne
- Arrondissement: Castelsarrasin
- Canton: Beaumont-de-Lomagne
- Intercommunality: Lomagne Tarn-et-Garonnaise

Government
  - Mayor (2020–2026): Jean-Louis Dupont
- Area^{1}: 18.95 km^{2} (7.32 sq mi)
- Elevation: 175 m (574 ft)
- Highest elevation: 271 m (889 ft)
- Lowest elevation: 108 m (354 ft)
- Population (2023): 291
  - Density: 15.4/km^{2} (39.8/sq mi)
- Time zone: UTC+01:00 (CET)
  - Summer (DST): UTC+02:00 (CEST)
- INSEE/Postal code: 82059 /82500
- ^{1} French Land Register data, which excludes lakes, ponds, glaciers > 1 km^{2} (0.386 sq mi or 247 acres) and river estuaries.

Faudoas (French pronunciation: [fodɔas]; Occitan: Fadoàs) is a commune in the Tarn-et-Garonne department in the Occitanie region in southern France.

== See also ==
- Communes of the Tarn-et-Garonne department
