= Davy Morrow =

Rugby union player from Northern Ireland

Robert Morrow
- Full name: Robert David Morrow
- Born: 24 August 1956 (age 70)
- School: Bangor Grammar School

Rugby union career
- Position: Flanker
International career
Years	Team	Apps	(Points)
1986	Ireland	3	(0)

Robert David Morrow (born 24 August 1956) is a former Ireland rugby union international from Northern Ireland.

A Bangor Grammar School product, Morrow was a flanker, regarded as a tough and forceful player.

Morrow came into the Ireland team for the 1986 Five Nations and was capped three times. He was captain of Bangor RFC and in 1988 stepped away from representative rugby with Ulster to concentrate on his club captaincy duties.

== See also ==
- List of Ireland national rugby union players
