= Betbezer-d'Armagnac =

- Commune
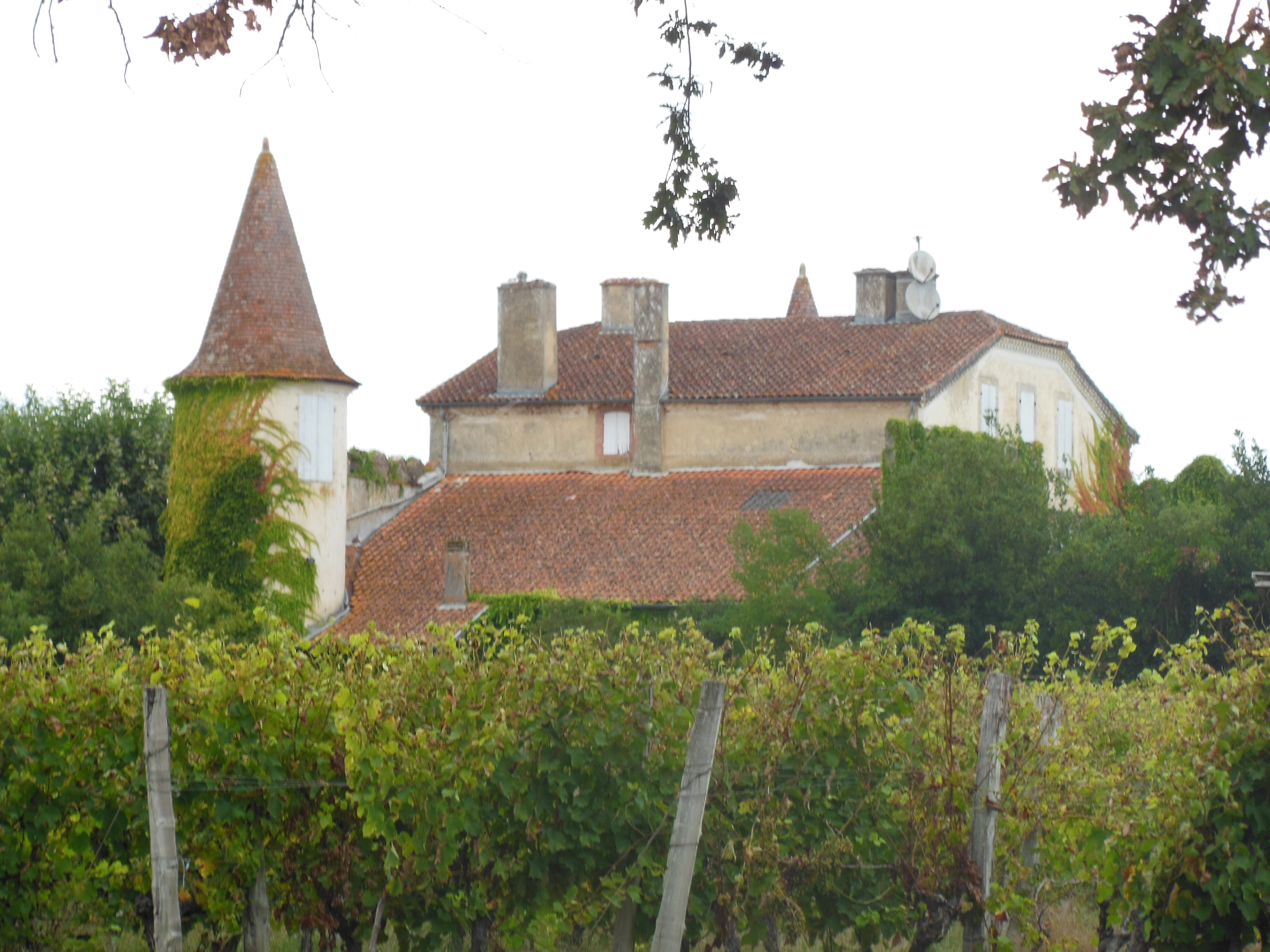
- Chateau
- Location of Betbezer-d'Armagnac
- Location within France Location within Nouvelle-Aquitaine
- Coordinates: 43°58′40″N 0°10′12″W
- Country: France
- Region: Nouvelle-Aquitaine
- Department: Landes
- Arrondissement: Mont-de-Marsan
- Canton: Haute Lande Armagnac

Government
  - Mayor (2024–2026): Pascal Bordes
- Area^{1}: 8.1 km^{2} (3.1 sq mi)
- Elevation: 120 m (390 ft)
- Highest elevation: 144 m (472 ft)
- Lowest elevation: 78 m (256 ft)
- Population (2023): 124
  - Density: 15/km^{2} (40/sq mi)
- Time zone: UTC+01:00 (CET)
  - Summer (DST): UTC+02:00 (CEST)
- INSEE/Postal code: 40039 /40240
- ^{1} French Land Register data, which excludes lakes, ponds, glaciers > 1 km^{2} (0.386 sq mi or 247 acres) and river estuaries.

Betbezer-d'Armagnac is a commune in the Landes department in Nouvelle-Aquitaine in southwestern France.

== Population ==
Historical population
Year	Pop.	±% p.a.
1968	153	—
1975	170	+1.52%
1982	155	−1.31%
1990	135	−1.71%
1999	106	−2.65%
2007	138	+3.35%
2012	139	+0.14%
2017	149	+1.40%
2023	124	−3.01%
Source: INSEE

== See also ==
- Communes of the Landes department
