= Michel Crémaschi =

France international rugby union player

- Born: 26 April 1956 (age 70) Betbezer, Landes, France
- Height: 6 ft 0 in (183 cm)
- Weight: 232 lb (105 kg)

Rugby union career
- Position: Prop
International career
Years	Team	Apps	(Points)
1980–84	France	11	(0)

Michel Crémaschi (born 26 April 1956) is a French former international rugby union player.

Born in Betbezer, Crémaschi was a prop forward, capped 11 times for France. He made his international debut in 1980 and was a member of the squad for the 1981 tour of Australia, but missed the Test matches after having his jaw broken against the ACT. His international career included a home series against the All Blacks in 1981.

Crémaschi played his club rugby for FC Lourdes and Stadoceste Tarbais, with his France selection coming while with the former. He was later involved in coaching and in 2019 was appointed coach of Rugby Club d'Arras.

== See also ==
- List of France national rugby union players
