= Bernard Herrero =

French rugby union player (born 1957)

- Born: 19 September 1957 (age 69) Toulon, France
- Height: 5 ft 11 in (180 cm)
- Weight: 209 lb (95 kg)
- Notable relative: André Herrero (brother)

Rugby union career
- Position: Hooker
International career
Years	Team	Apps	(Points)
1983–86	France	2	(0)

Bernard Herrero (born 19 September 1957) is a French former rugby union international.

Born in Toulon, Herrero is the youngest of four brothers to have played for RC Toulon, which includes another France international in André Herrero. He is of Spanish descent.

Herrero, nicknamed "le Tigre" (the Tiger), played as a hooker and was capped twice for the national team. He featured against Ireland at Lansdowne Road in the 1983 Five Nations and played against the Pumas on the 1986 tour of Argentina. His time at Toulon included a Brennus Shield win in 1987 and he also had a stint with RC Nice, from where he had gained his France caps. In 1988, Herrero was shot by a drunken customer he had expelled from the bar he owned in the port of Toulon, receiving career-ending injuries to his abdomen and hip.

== See also ==
- List of France national rugby union players
