= Robbie McGrath =

Irish rugby union player

- Born: 18 July 1951 (age 75)
- School: Newbridge College

Rugby union career
- Position: Scrum-half
Amateur team(s)
Years	Team	Apps	(Points)
- Wanderers
International career
Years	Team	Apps	(Points)
1976–1984	Ireland	17	(4)

Robbie McGrath (born 18 July 1951) is a former Irish international rugby union player. His playing position was as scrum-half.

McGrath played schools rugby for Newbridge College before joining Wanderers Football Club.

McGrath was capped 17 times for Ireland, his first taste in a green jersey came against Southland in Invercargill during Ireland's 1976 tour of New Zealand and Fiji. He broke into the team in January 1977, his official debut coming against Wales at Cardiff Arms Park. McGrath was integral to Ireland's success in 1982, playing every game in the 1982 Five Nations Championship campaign culminating in Ireland's first winning of the Triple Crown in 33 years. He was again part of the Irish squad who shared the 1983 Five Nations Championship title with France, finishing level on points. McGrath featured in five Five Nations Championships (1977, 1981, 1982, 1983, 1984). His last game for Ireland came against the same side he had made his first cap against, Wales, in February 1984.

Robbie McGrath was elected President of Boyne Rugby Football Club in July 2013.
