= 1981 Five Nations Championship =

Rugby union competition

- Date: 17 January – 21 March 1981
- Countries: England; Ireland; France; Scotland; Wales

Tournament statistics
- Champions: France (7th title)
- Grand Slam: France (3rd title)
- Matches played: 10
- Tries scored: 25 (2.5 per match)
- Top point scorer: (England) Dusty Hare (30)
- Top try scorers: France Laurent Pardo (2) (Scotland) Steve Munro (2)

The 1981 Five Nations Championship was the 52nd series of the rugby union Five Nations Championship. Including the previous incarnations as the Home Nations and Five Nations, this was the 87th series of the northern hemisphere rugby union championship. Ten matches were played between 17 January and 21 March.

France were the winners, winning the championship outright for the eighth time. They had also shared the title on four other occasions. In winning all their four matches they also won the Grand Slam for the third time.

== Participants ==
Nation	Venue	City	Head coach	Captain
England	Twickenham Stadium	London	Mike Davis	Bill Beaumont
France	Parc des Princes	Paris	Jacques Fouroux	Jean-Pierre Rives
Ireland	Lansdowne Road	Dublin	Tom Kiernan	Fergus Slattery
Scotland	Murrayfield Stadium	Edinburgh	Jim Telfer	Andy Irvine
Wales	National Stadium	Cardiff	John Lloyd	Steve Fenwick

== Table ==
Pos	Team	Pld	W	D	L	PF	PA	PD	Pts
1	France	4	4	0	0	70	49	+21	8
2	England	4	2	0	2	64	60	+4	4
2	Scotland	4	2	0	2	51	54	−3	4
2	Wales	4	2	0	2	51	61	−10	4
5	Ireland	4	0	0	4	36	48	−12	0

== Results ==
17 January 1981

France	16–9	Scotland
Try: Blanco; Bertranne; Con: Caussade; Pen: Gabernet; Viviès		Try: Rutherford; Con: Renwick; Pen: Irvine

Parc des Princes, Paris
Attendance: 44,448
Referee: K. Rowlands (Wales)

17 January 1981

Wales	21–19	England
Try: Davis; Con: Fenwick; Pen: Fenwick (4); Drop: Davies		Try: Hare; Pen: Hare (5)

National Stadium, Cardiff
Referee: J. B. Anderson (Scotland)

7 February 1981

Ireland	13–19	France
Try: MacNeill; Pen: Campbell (3)		Try: Pardo; Pen: Laporte (2); Gabernet; Drop: Laporte (2)

Lansdowne Road, Dublin
Attendance: 51,000
Referee: C. Norling (Wales)

7 February 1981

Scotland	15–6	Wales
Try: Tomes; Penalty try Con: Renwick (2); Pen: Renwick		Pen: Fenwick (2)

Murrayfield Stadium, Edinburgh
Referee: D. I. H. Burnett (Ireland)

21 February 1981

Wales	9–8	Ireland
Pen: Evans (2); Drop: Pearce		Try: Slattery; MacNeill

National Stadium, Cardiff
Referee: F. Palmade (France)

21 February 1981

England	23–17	Scotland
Try: Davies; Slemen; Woodward; Con: Hare; Pen: Hare (3)		Try: Munro (2); Calder; Con: Irvine; Pen: Irvine

Twickenham Stadium, London
Referee: D. I. H. Burnett (Ireland)

7 March 1981

France	19–15	Wales
Try: Gabernet; Pen: Laporte (3); Gabernet (2)		Try: Richards; Con: Evans; Pen: Evans (3)

Parc des Princes, Paris
Attendance: 45,249
Referee: A. Welsby (England)

7 March 1981

Ireland	6–10	England
Drop: Campbell; MacNeill		Try: Dodge; Rose; Con: Rose

Lansdowne Road, Dublin
Referee: J. P. Bonnett (France)

Some moments of the England v France match at Twickenham

21 March 1981

England	12–16	France
Pen: Rose (4)		Try: Lacans; Pardo; Con: Laporte; Drop: Laporte (2)

Twickenham Stadium, London
Attendance: 62,000
Referee: Alan Hosie (Scotland)

21 March 1981

Scotland	10–9	Ireland
Try: Hay; Pen: Irvine; Drop: Rutherford		Try: Irwin; Con: Campbell; Pen: Campbell

Murrayfield Stadium, Edinburgh
Referee: L. M. Prideaux (England)
