= Steve Boyle (rugby union) =

English rugby union player (born 1953)

Stephen Brent Boyle (born 9 August 1953) is a former England international rugby union player. In 1983 he toured with the British and Irish Lions on their tour to New Zealand and at the time played club rugby for Gloucester.
