= Christian Delage =

French rugby union player (born 1954)

- Born: 16 January 1954 (age 72) Brive-la-Gaillarde, France
- Height: 5 ft 9 in (175 cm)
- Weight: 160 lb (73 kg)

Rugby union career
- Position: Fly-half / Fullback
International career
Years	Team	Apps	(Points)
1983	France	2	(0)

Christian Delage (born 16 January 1954) is a French former rugby union international.

Delage, known as "Coco", was born in Brive-la-Gaillarde and played junior rugby at Stade Langonnais, but got his start at the top level with CA Brive, a club his father had played for.

After moving to SU Agen, Delage won his first Brennus Shield in 1982.

Delage, who had been a substitute for France in the 1977 grand slam, gained his two caps in the 1983 Five Nations Championship, as a flyhalf in matches against Scotland and Ireland.

A Brennus Shield-winner again in 1991 with Bègles-Bordeaux at the age of 37, Delage continued playing into his early 40s and had a season at Stade Bordelais, before finishing his career back at Stade Langonnais.

== See also ==
- List of France national rugby union players
