= Hugo MacNeill (rugby union) =

Irish rugby union player (born 1958)

Hugo MacNeill OBE
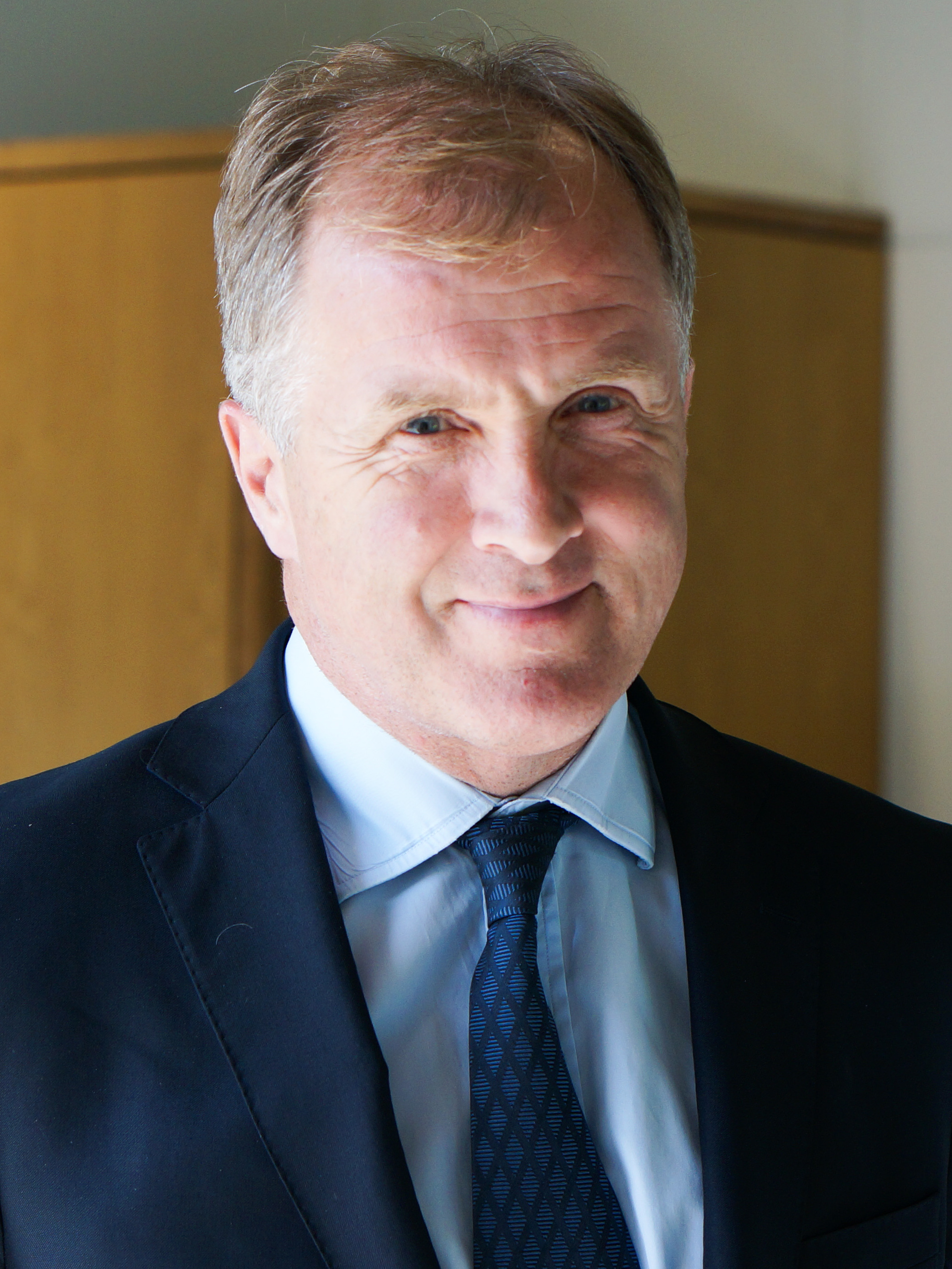
- MacNeill in 2014
- Full name: Hugh Patrick MacNeill
- Born: 16 September 1958 (age 68) Dublin, Ireland
- School: Blackrock College
- University: Trinity College, Dublin; St Edmund Hall, Oxford

Rugby union career
- Position: Full back
Senior career
Years	Team	Apps	(Points)
- Blackrock College
1978–1981	Dublin University		
1982–1984	Oxford University		
1985–1986	London Irish		
Provincial / State sides
Years	Team	Apps	(Points)
- Leinster
International career
Years	Team	Apps	(Points)
1981–1988	Ireland	37	(46)
1983	British and Irish Lions	3	(0)
1989	French Barbarians	1	
- Spouse: Jennifer Carroll MacNeill (m. 2010)
- Children: 1

Hugh Patrick MacNeill (born 16 September 1958), commonly known as Hugo MacNeill, is a former rugby union player who played for Ireland, Leinster, the French Barbarians and the British and Irish Lions during the 1980s. During the late 1970s he also played Football for University College Dublin and Dublin University. After retiring from sport, MacNeill went on to serve as a Managing Director for Goldman Sachs. He has also worked as a rugby pundit for TV3 and BBC Radio 5 Live.

== Education ==
=== Blackrock College ===
MacNeill completed his secondary level education at Blackrock College. On 20 March 1977, he was a member of the Blackrock College team that won the Leinster Schools Rugby Senior Cup, defeating St Mary's College 24–12 after extra time at Lansdowne Road. The St Mary's team featured MacNeill's future Ireland teammate Paul Dean. MacNeill scored a conversion and two penalties in extra time to help seal victory for Blackrock.

=== Trinity College Dublin ===
MacNeill subsequently attended Trinity College Dublin where he earned a degree in economics and social studies followed by and a diploma in Anglo-Irish literature. He was elected a Scholar of the College in 1979 in economics and social studies. His lecturers included Brendan Kennelly and David Norris. While at Trinity he played for both the rugby union and association football teams. On 26 November 1980, he captained Dublin University to a 9–3 win over University College Dublin in The Colours Match. He also went on a rugby union tour to Japan and represented the team in games against both Oxford University and Cambridge University. He played association football for both University College Dublin and Dublin University A.F.C. In 1979, he was a member of the Dublin University team, coached by Liam Tuohy, that won the Collingwood Cup. MacNeill scored twice in the final as Dublin University defeated Maynooth University 2–0.

=== Oxford University ===
MacNeill also studied economics at St Edmund Hall, Oxford. Between 1982 and 1984 he played in three Varsity matches for Oxford University against Cambridge University but lost all three. He captained the Oxford team in 1983.

== International career ==
=== Ireland ===
Between 1981 and 1988, MacNeill made 37 appearances for Ireland. He made his debut for Ireland on 7 February 1981 against France at Lansdowne Road, scoring the first of ten international tries. In the same championship he scored a second try against Wales and a drop goal against England. He scored further tries against England in 1982 and Scotland in 1988. He also scored a penalty against Wales in 1983. MacNeill was a member of the Ireland teams that won the Five Nations Championship and Triple Crown in 1982 and 1985 and shared the championship with France in 1983. He was also a member of the Ireland squad at the 1987 Rugby World Cup, where he scored four tries in Ireland's four games, one against Canada, two against Tonga and one in the quarter-final defeat to Australia. MacNeill made his final appearance for Ireland against England on 23 April 1988. Together with Tony Ward, Moss Keane, Donal Spring and Ciaran Fitzgerald, MacNeill declined to take part in the 1981 Ireland rugby union tour of South Africa during the apartheid era. In the aftermath of the 1996 Docklands bombing, together with Trevor Ringland, MacNeill helped organise a friendly between Ireland and the Barbarians at Lansdowne Road to show that the people of Ireland wanted peace.

=== British and Irish Lions ===
MacNeill made three test appearances for the British and Irish Lions during their 1983 tour of New Zealand. MacNeill scored a penalty against Auckland in the first of his nine appearances on the tour. He started the first two matches against the All Blacks before coming off the bench to replace Ollie Campbell in the final test.

=== French Barbarians ===
On 22 October 1989 MacNeill played for the French Barbarians against Fiji. Fiji won the game 32–16.

== Later years ==
Between 1982 and 2000, MacNeill worked in London, initially for the Boston Consulting Group and later for Goldman Sachs. In 2000 he returned to Dublin where he continued to work for Goldman Sachs as a director of their investment branch in Ireland. He has also served as chairman of several charities including GOAL, The Ireland Funds and the British Irish Association.

In 2010, MacNeill married Jennifer Carroll MacNeill. Carroll is a Trinity College Dublin and UCD graduate, Fine Gael politician, barrister and author.

In 2014, MacNeill was appointed chairman of a working group established to help bring the 2023 Rugby World Cup to Ireland. He also worked as a pundit for TV3 during their 2015 Rugby World Cup coverage. He has also worked as a pundit for BBC Radio 5 Live during Six Nations Championships.

In February 2020, MacNeill retired from Goldman Sachs to contest the 2020 Seanad election for the Dublin University constituency. He came fourth, in a contest for three seats. He also contested the 2022 Dublin University by-election and the 2025 Seanad election.

MacNeill was appointed an Honorary Officer of the Order of the British Empire (OBE) in the 2023 Special Honours for services to British-Irish relations.

== Honours ==
=== Rugby union ===
Ireland

- Five Nations Championship/Triple Crown : 2
  - 1982, 1985
- Five Nations Championship: 1
  - 1983 ^{[Note 1]}

Dublin University

- The Colours Match: 1
  - 1980

Blackrock College

- Leinster Schools Rugby Senior Cup: 1
  - 1977

Notes

- ^1 Ireland and France shared the championship in 1983.

=== Association football ===
Dublin University

- Collingwood Cup: 1
  - 1979
