= Jean-Louis Dupont (rugby union) =

French rugby union player (born 1956)

- Born: 17 March 1956 (age 70) Beaumont-de-Lomagne, France
- Height: 5 ft 9 in (175 cm)
- Weight: 191 lb (87 kg)

Rugby union career
- Position: Hooker
International career
Years	Team	Apps	(Points)
1983	France	1	(0)

Jean-Louis Dupont (born 17 March 1956) is a French former rugby union international.

Dupont was born in Beaumont-de-Lomagne.

A hooker, Dupont formed a front row at SU Agen made up entirely of farmers. Along with France prop Daniel Dubroca and future international Jean-Louis Tolot, the three were known as the "première ligne des agriculteurs" ("frontline of farmers") and contributed to SU Agen's championship-winning side in 1982.

Dupont was a regular reserve hooker for France during the 1980s, behind the established Philippe Dintrans. His only opportunity came in the 1983 Five Nations, gaining a cap in France's win over Scotland at the Parc des Princes.

Since 2008, Dupont has served as mayor of the town of Faudoas.

== See also ==
- List of France national rugby union players
