= Huw Davies (rugby union) =

England international rugby union player

- Born: Geoffrey Huw Davies; 18 February 1959 (age 67) Eastbourne
- Height: 5 ft 9 in (175 cm)

Rugby union career
- Position: Fly-half
Senior career
Years	Team	Apps	(Points)
198?-199?	Wasps RFC		
International career
Years	Team	Apps	(Points)
1981-1986	England	21	(16)

Geoffrey Huw Davies (born 18 February 1959, in Eastbourne) is an English rugby union player, who played as fly-half. He attended King Edward VI College, Stourbridge, in the West Midlands. He played for Coventry FC (RU), Wasps RFC and for England.

== Career ==
Davies had first test cap on 21 February 1981, during a match against Scotland, his last cap was against France, on 15 March 1986. He was also called up for the 1987 Rugby World Cup England squad, but he did not play any match at the tournament.

== Honours ==
- 21 caps (+ 5 non-test) for England
- Caps by year : 5 in 1981, 3 in 1982, 3 in 1983, 3 in 1984, 3 in 1985, 4 in 1986
- Disputed Five Nations Championships : 1981, 1982, 1983, 1984, 1986
