= Jeff Squire =

British Lions & Wales international rugby union footballer

- Born: Jeffrey Squire; 23 September 1951 (age 75) Pontywaun, Caerphilly County Borough, Wales
- Height: 191 cm (6 ft 3 in)
- Weight: 97 kg (15 st 4 lb; 214 lb)
- School: Newbridge Grammar School
- University: St. Luke's College

Rugby union career
- Position(s): Flanker, Number 8
Amateur team(s)
Years	Team	Apps	(Points)
- Cross Keys RFC
–	Exeter Chiefs		
–	Newbridge RFC		
–	Newport RFC	86	
–	Pontypool RFC	177	(248)
–	Monmouthshire		
–	Barbarian F.C.		
International career
Years	Team	Apps	(Points)
1977–1983	Wales	29	(12)
1977–1983	British Lions	6	(0)

Jeffrey Squire (born 23 September 1951) in Newport, Monmouthshire, is a former Welsh international rugby union player and British Lion.

== Club career ==
He started his playing career at St Lukes where he was captain, then Cross Keys RFC, Newbridge RFC, Newport RFC and joined Pontypool RFC in September 1978. Jeff Squire made his debut for Pontypool on 9 September 1978 in a 56 - 3 win against Pontypool Junior Union. He was club captain for Pontypool from 1979 until 1982 and Player of the Year for the 1981/82 season. In total for Pontypool he made 177 appearances and scored 62 tries.

== International & British Lion ==
He was called to the Wales side in 1977, playing against Ireland and France. He was also selected for the 1977 British Lions tour to New Zealand and played in Newport's Welsh Cup winning side. The next international season was to be one of the most memorable in Wales with the Grand Slam won and he played against England, Scotland, Ireland and France. He also played against Australia and the All Blacks again.

Jeff Squire gained 29 caps in total for Wales, scoring three tries, the first against England at Twickenham in 1980, the second against England at Cardiff in 1983 and his third against France in Paris in 1983. He also played in the non-cap games for Wales against Argentina in 1976, Romania in 1979 and the New Zealand Maoris in 1982.

He was selected again for the British Lions for their tour of South Africa in 1980, playing in all four tests. He toured for a third time with the Lions in 1983 to New Zealand. In total, he made 32 appearances for the Lions, including 6 tests and scored 6 tries.
