= Nick Jeavons =

British Lions & England international rugby union player

Nicholas Clive Jeavons (born November 12, 1957) is a former England international rugby union player. In 1983 he toured with the British and Irish Lions on their tour to New Zealand and at the time played club rugby for Moseley.
