= Peter Dods =

Scotland international rugby union player

- Born: Peter Dods; 6 January 1958 (age 68) Galashiels, Scotland
- Height: 1.75 m (5 ft 9 in)
- Weight: 79 kg (12 st 6 lb)

Rugby union career
- Position: Fullback
Amateur team(s)
Years	Team	Apps	(Points)
-	Gala		
Provincial / State sides
Years	Team	Apps	(Points)
-	South of Scotland		
-	Reds Trial		
International career
Years	Team	Apps	(Points)
1979-82	Scotland 'B'	5	
1983-91	Scotland	23	(210)

Peter Dods (born 6 January 1958) is a former Scotland international rugby union player. His regular playing position was Fullback.

== Rugby union career ==
=== Amateur career ===
Dods played for Gala at fullback.

=== Provincial career ===
Dods was capped by South of Scotland.

He played for the Reds Trial side in their match against Blues Trial on 3 January 1987.

=== International career ===
Dods won his first Scotland 'B' cap against Ireland 'B' on 1 December 1979.

Dods made his international debut against Ireland in the opening match of the 1983 Five Nations. It was a largely disappointing championship for Scotland, but Dods scored 11 points in a 22–12 win over England to avoid the wooden spoon. This was to be the last Scottish win at Twickenham for over 30 years.

The following season was much more successful for Scotland, starting with a 25-all draw against New Zealand. He landed five kicks in that match and had the chance to give Scotland a first-ever win over the All Blacks, but failed with a last minute conversion attempt from near the touchline. There was continued success for Dods and Scotland in the 1984 Five Nations as Scotland completed their first Grand Slam since 1925, and he was the team's top scorer with a total of 50 points. This included five penalties and one conversion in Scotland's 21–12 win over France in the championship decider.

After suffering a whitewash in the 1985 championship, Scotland made a number of changes to the side in 1986, which resulted in Dods losing his place to Gavin Hastings. Hastings would keep him out of the international side for most of the rest of his career, although he did play throughout the 1989 Five Nations and his performances won him a call up to the British & Irish Lions' tour of Australia that summer. He played in five matches on the tour, scoring a total of 66 points, although he was not selected for any of the tests. In 1988, Dods captained a Scotland touring team to Zimbabwe which won all of its five matches, although the two internationals were not given full cap status by Scotland.

Dods made his final appearances for Scotland during the 1991 Rugby World Cup, winning his 23rd and final cap as a replacement in the third place play-off defeat to New Zealand. His younger brother Michael also won eight caps for Scotland.
