= Brendan Mullin =

Irish rugby union player

- Born: Brendan John Mullin; 31 October 1963 (age 63) Jerusalem, Israel
- Height: 1.85 m (6 ft 1 in)
- School: Blackrock College
- University: Trinity College Dublin
- Notable relative: Gavin Mullin (son)

Rugby union career
- Position: Outside Centre
Senior career
| Years | Team | Apps | (Points) |
- Dublin University Football Club
- Oxford University
- London Irish
- Blackrock College RFC
Provincial / State sides
| Years | Team | Apps | (Points) |
- Leinster
| 1984-1995 | Ireland | 55 | (87) |
| 1989 | British & Irish Lions | 2 | (0) |
| 1984-1989 | Barbarians | 3 | (0) |

Brendan John Mullin (born Jerusalem, Israel in 31 October 1963) is a former Ireland international rugby union football player. He played as a centre and has been described as "one of the last great Irish players of rugby’s amateur era." After retirement from rugby, Mullin worked for Powerscourt Investments. Following this, he worked for NCB stockbrokers, where he sourced and managed ultra-high net worth clients. He subsequently joined Bank of Ireland. After a lengthy investigation, he was arrested in 2021 and brought to court in October 2024 to face charges relating to the theft of more than €570,000 from the bank. He was found guilty in November 2024 and jailed for three years.

== Early life ==
Mullin spent his early life in Jerusalem, Israel and attended secondary school in Blackrock College, Dublin. A Leinster and Ireland schoolboy international, Mullin studied law at Trinity College Dublin and reportedly won "an Oxford 'Blue'."

Mullin was also a noted hurdler, winning the All-Ireland Schools senior boys’ hurdles in 1981 and 1982, with a personal best of 14.41 seconds for the 110m hurdles.

== Rugby career ==
Mullin had 55 caps for Ireland, scoring 17 tries and 1 conversion, 72 points in aggregate. His debut was at the 16–9 loss to Australia, on 10 November 1984, in Dublin, and his final cap was at the 36–12 loss against France, on 10 June 1995, at the 1995 Rugby World Cup, in Durban, South Africa. He was Ireland's record try-scorer for many years.

Mullin played at three Rugby World Cup finals, in 1987, 1991 and 1995. He played in nine Five Nations championships: 1985, 1986, 1987, 1988, 1989, 1990, 1991, 1992 and 1995.

He toured Australia in 1989 with the British and Irish Lions and at the time played club rugby for Blackrock College RFC. Mullin also played three times for the Barbarians in the 1980s.

== Criminal activity ==
Mullin was arrested in Dublin on 21 September 2021 and brought before the Dublin District Court on foot of an investigation by the Garda National Economic Crime Bureau. He was charged with nine counts of theft under the Theft and Fraud Offences Act, accusing him of stealing €578,000 from the Bank of Ireland between 2011 and 2013. Mullin, who had been a managing director of Bank of Ireland private banking, was also accused of deceiving two people to sign a payment instruction to make a gain for himself or causing a loss to another, and with five counts of false accounting. He made no comment when informed of the charges and was released on bail after agreeing to surrender his passport.

The trial began on 15 October 2024, took three weeks and ended in early November 2024. Mullin was found guilty of 12 of the 14 charges presented, including several counts of stealing more than €570,000 between 2011 and 2013, and several charges relating to false accounting practices. The judge directed the jury to return a verdict of not guilty on a further count of deception. He was sentenced on 25 November 2024 to 36 months in prison, though he was released from prison after serving 13 months.

In June 2026, Mullin appeared in court charged with stealing perfume from Brown Thomas.
