= Christian Bélascain =

French rugby union player (1953–2004)

- Born: 1 November 1953 Biarritz, France
- Died: 8 January 2004 (aged 50) Bayonne, France
- Height: 5 ft 11 in (180 cm)
- Weight: 188 lb (85 kg)

Rugby union career
- Position: Centre
International career
Years	Team	Apps	(Points)
1977–83	France	18	(4)

Christian Bélascain (1 November 1953 — 8 January 2004) was a French rugby union international.

Born in Biarritz, Bélascain learnt his rugby at Boucau Stade and spent most of his career with Aviron Bayonnais. He was capped 18 times for France as a centre between 1977 and 1983, which included four Five Nations campaigns.

Bélascain died of a ruptured aneurysm in 2004 at the age of 50. The Reichel B, an under-21 championship for non-professional French clubs, was renamed in his honour and he also bears the name of a Bayonne rugby stadium.

== See also ==
- List of France national rugby union players
