= Mark Wyatt (rugby union, born 1957) =

Wales international rugby union footballer

- Born: Mark Anthony Wyatt; 19 February 1957 (age 69) Crickhowell, Powys, Wales
- School: Brecon Grammar School
- University: University College, Swansea

Rugby union career
- Position: Full-back
Amateur team(s)
Years	Team	Apps	(Points)
- Swansea RFC
–	Barbarian F.C.		
–	Breconshire		
International career
Years	Team	Apps	(Points)
1983–1987	Wales	10	(81)

Mark Anthony Wyatt (born 19 February 1957) is a former Welsh international rugby union player. He played club rugby for several university teams, and later Swansea. He was selected to play for Wales on ten occasions, scoring 81 points. Mark was famed for his attacking fullback play and his place kicking. He is the record points scorer for Swansea with 2734 points. Mark's current sporting interest lie on the golf course, playing off a handicap of 4 and he is a member of The Royal Porthcawl Golf club. He is a Director at Gower Business Systems Ltd a leading ICT company in South Wales.
