= Moss Finn =

Irish rugby union player

- Full name: Maurice Cornelius Finn
- Born: 29 March 1957 (age 69) Bishopstown, Cork, Ireland

Rugby union career
- Position: Wing
International career
| Years | Team | Apps | (Points) |
| 1979–86 | Ireland | 14 | (16) |

Maurice Cornelius "Moss" Finn (born 29 March 1957) is an Irish former rugby union international active in the 1970s and 1980s. He ran a sporting goods store called 'Finn's Corner' in Cork for many years after retirement.

Born and raised in Cork, Finn attended Presentation Brothers College and played some of his early rugby with Highfield. In 1978, Finn was the youngest member of the Munster team which famously defeated the All Blacks at Thomond Park. He appeared in nine seasons with Cork Constitution and also played one year at London Irish.

Finn represented Ireland in 14 Test matches from 1979 to 1986. In 1982, he won a Triple Crown with Ireland and scored two tries to beat Wales at Lansdowne Road. He scored a further two tries in a win over France in 1983. Most of his appearances for Ireland came on the wing but for his Tests in 1984 he was switched to the centre.

== See also ==
- List of Ireland national rugby union players
