= John Perkins (rugby union) =

Welsh rugby union player (born 1954)

John Perkins (born 27 February 1954 (age 72)) is a former Wales international rugby union player.

Perkins made his debut for Wales on 19 February 1983 versus Scotland. He played club rugby for Pontypool RFC.
