= Bob Norster =

GB & Wales international rugby union player

- Born: Robert Norster; 23 June 1957 (age 69) Ebbw Vale
- Height: 6 ft 5 in (1.96 m)
- Weight: 16 st 8 lb (105 kg)
- School: Nantyglo Grammar School
- University: University College Cardiff

Rugby union career
- Position: Lock
Amateur team(s)
Years	Team	Apps	(Points)
- Abertillery RFC
1978–1989	Cardiff RFC	287	(76)
–	Barbarian F.C.		
International career
Years	Team	Apps	(Points)
1982–1989	Wales	34	(8)
1983–1989	British and Irish Lions	3	(0)

Robert Leonard "Bob" Norster (born 23 June 1957) is a former Welsh international rugby union player. He was selected for the 1983 British Lions tour to New Zealand and the 1989 British Lions tour to Australia.

A former Welsh international lock forward, he holds 34 caps for Wales and was a British Lions tourist to New Zealand in 1983 and to Australia in 1989. He also regularly represented the Barbarians and finished his playing career representing a World XV against South Africa in Johannesburg in 1989. He was known as a master in the lineout. Norster was the Cardiff RFC captain for two seasons between 1987–89 and briefly for Wales to New Zealand in 1988. Shortly following retirement from the playing field, he was appointed as Honorary Team Manager for the Welsh national side that progressed to win the Five Nations Championship in 1994. He is one of only twenty former Cardiff players in the Arms Park Hall of Fame and was also inducted into Welsh Rugby’s Hall of Fame in 2008.

During a more than thirty-year association with both Cardiff RFC and the Blues, Norster was the Chief Executive of Cardiff RFC and latterly Cardiff Blues from 2001 until December 2011 and played a key role in the establishment of the Blues in 2003, as part of the major changes brought about by the regionalisation of the national sport in Wales. Most recently this included the relocation of the Blues to a new home at Cardiff City Stadium which they shared with Cardiff City Football Club. The team was crowned EDF Energy Anglo-Welsh champions in 2009 and Amlin European Challenge Cup champions in 2010.

Originally a school teacher, Bob throughout the bulk of his playing days and managing the national team worked for both the Xerox Corporation and Lloyds Blackhorse and has nearly 20 years experience of managing financial sales and marketing programmes. During his time at the helm of the Blues, Norster was also a founding board director of the Celtic League and also an elected representative of the Welsh Regions at the board table of the European Rugby Cup on both rugby and commercial matters.

Bob has also been Honorary Regional Chairman of the Wooden Spoon Society in Wales for more than a decade. The Wooden Spoon is a very successful rugby charity that supports disadvantaged children and young people. In 2010, Bob successfully climbed the world’s highest free-standing mountain, Mount Kilimanjaro together with a group of other former national team captains to raise funds for cancer care in Wales.
