= Didier Codorniou =

France international rugby union player (born 1958)

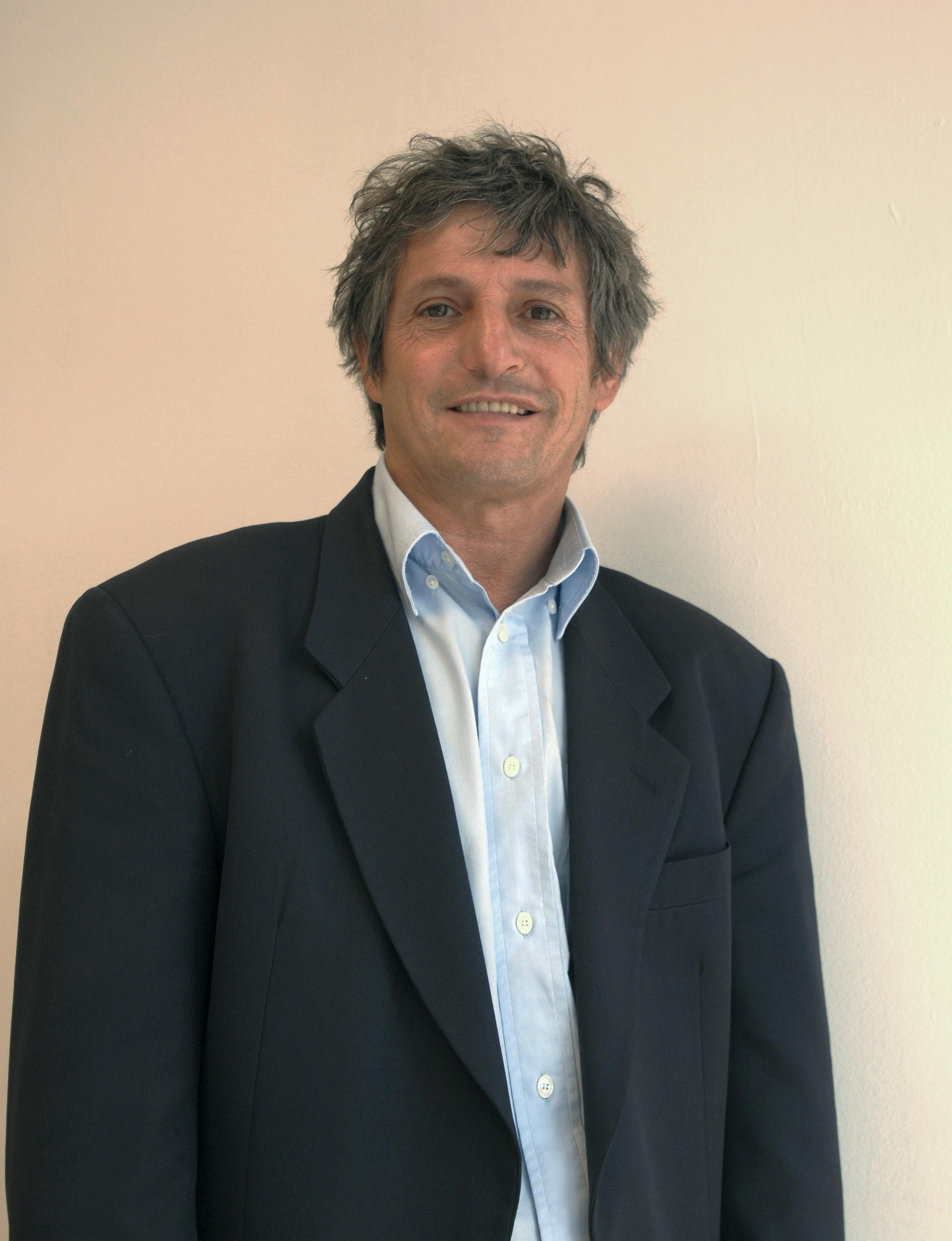
- Born: 13 February 1958 (age 68) Narbonne, France
- Height: 1.70 m (5 ft 7 in)
- Weight: 68 kg (150 lb)

Rugby union career
- Position: Centre
Amateur team(s)
Years	Team	Apps	(Points)
1975-1986	RC Narbonne		
1986-1989	Stade Toulousain		
1989-1991	FC villefranchois		
1991-1994	RC Narbonne		
International career
Years	Team	Apps	(Points)
1979-1986	France	31	(20)

Didier Codorniou (born 13 February 1958 in Narbonne) is a former French rugby union player and a French politician. He played as a Centre.

Codorniou played for RC Narbonne and Stade Toulousain. He earned his first national cap on 7 July 1979 against the All Blacks, in the first victory France had achieved over the New Zealand team in New Zealand.

In Path to Victory former Australian flyhalf Mark Ella wrote, "After playing against Didier Codorniou, I thought he was the best centre in the world. He directed all the backline traffic. He had the ball skills to set the play up or be an electrifying individualist."

== Honours ==
- Grand Slam : 1981
- French rugby champion, 1979 with RC Narbonne and 1989 with Stade Toulousain.
- Challenge Yves du Manoir 1978, 1979 and 1984 with RC Narbonne
