= John Bevan (rugby union) =

British Lions & Wales international rugby union footballer

- Born: John Bevan; 12 March 1948 Neath, Wales
- Died: 5 June 1986 (aged 38)

Rugby union career
Senior career
Years	Team	Apps	(Points)
–	Aberavon RFC		
International career
Years	Team	Apps	(Points)
–	Wales		
–	British & Irish Lions		

John David Bevan (12 March 1948 – 5 June 1986) was a Welsh international rugby union footballer, one of two John Bevans who played for Wales during the 1970s.

Bevan was born in Neath. He played for Aberavon RFC, the British Lions and The Barbarians. He formed a formidable club half back partnership with Clive Shell, and was a player got the most out of players outside of him. During his playing career he rivalled Phil Bennett for the Welsh No 10 position. Bennett originally held the place but the club performances of Bevan put him in the ascendancy during the 1974–75 season.

A fly half, capped four times for Wales, he won his first cap against France in Paris in January 1975, following a sound performance playing for The Barbarians in the drawn game (12–12) against the touring All Blacks at Twickenham the previous month. During the Paris test, he was one of six Welsh players making their debut (Trevor Evans, Charlie Faulkner, Graham Price, Ray Gravell and Steve Fenwick being the others). Wales won for the first time in Paris for many years by 25–12 points with Bevan producing a remarkable try-saving tackle.

England were the next opponents for the unchanged Welsh and were hammered 20–4 at Cardiff Arms Park. Next up were Scotland at Murrayfield where Bevan sustained a dislocated shoulder. He was replaced by Bennett and Wales lost the match 12–10. Bevan’s season was over.

In the 1975–76 season Bevan won his place back and was selected to face the touring Wallabies in Cardiff. His ability to make space for others resulted in Wales winning the fixture 28-3, J.J. Williams, scoring three tries.

Bevan was picked for the first Five Nations international against England, with the young David Richards on the bench, remarkably at the expense of Bennett who was omitted from the squad. In a twist of fate, both Bevan and Richards obtained injuries and Bennett was recalled. Wales beat England and went on to win the Grand Slam. Bevan never played for his country again.

Bevan, a schoolteacher at Dyffryn Comprehensive at Port Talbot toured New Zealand with the British Lions on their 1977 tour but did not play in any of the internationals against the All Blacks, although, following a dip in form of the tour captain Phil Bennett, many thought he should have been picked for the final test. Bevan was one of three Aberavon players to make the 1977 tour, Allan Martin lock and Clive Williams prop being the others.

After his playing career was cut short by his shoulder injury, he coached Aberavon RFC and then the Wales national side from 1982 to 1985. He was forced to retire on the grounds of ill health.

Bevan was also a cricketer, an opening batsman who captained Neath Cricket Club and represented his country.

He died of cancer aged 38 in 1986, survived by his wife Judith, a son and a daughter.
