= Billy James (rugby union) =

- Born: William John James; 18 July 1956 Port Talbot, Wales
- Height: 183 cm (6 ft 0 in)
- Weight: 115 kg (18 st 2 lb)

Rugby union career
- Position: Hooker
Amateur team(s)
Years	Team	Apps	(Points)
- Aberavon RFC
1988-1991	Swansea RFC	62	(16)
International career
Years	Team	Apps	(Points)
1983-1987	Wales	21	(4)

William John James (born 18 July 1956) is a former Welsh international rugby union player.

A hooker, he captained the Wales national rugby union team on one occasion against Ireland in 1987. James played his club rugby for Aberavon RFC where he was initially nurtured under the eye of club legend and then captain Morton Howells, whom he succeeded in the front row berth.

James was one of three front row Internationals in the Aberavon RFC side at that time – Clive Williams and John Richardson being the others.

He captained Aberavon in the 1979–80, 1980–81, 1984–85, 1987–88 & 1988–89 seasons.

In 1989 James was one of several leading players who fell out with the management of the club over several issues, the major one being finance and the way forward. No agreement was reached and he was one of nineteen players who left the club. He finished his career with Swansea RFC. He played 3 seasons for the whites making over 60 appearances and scored 2 tries and 4 conversions.
