= Pierre Dospital =

French rugby union player

- Born: May 15, 1950 (age 76) Itxassou, France
- Height: 6 ft 1 in (1.85 m)
- Weight: 227 lb (103 kg)

Rugby union career
- Position: Prop
Amateur team(s)
Years	Team	Apps	(Points)
1984-1986	Barbarian Rugby Club		
Senior career
Years	Team	Apps	(Points)
- Aviron Bayonnais
International career
Years	Team	Apps	(Points)
1977-1985	France	24	(0)
- Correct as of September 12, 2020

Pierre Dospital (born May 15, 1950) is a French retired rugby union player who played at prop for the France national rugby union team and for the French rugby union club Aviron Bayonnais.

== Early life and career ==
Pierre Dospital was born on May 15, 1950, in Itxassou in south-western France.

Dospital made his debut for the France national rugby union team on December 10, 1977.

He made a total of 24 official appearances for the French national team.

Dospital also played for the French rugby union club Aviron Bayonnais and was capped twice for the French Barbarians in 1984 and 1986.

== See also ==
- France national rugby union team
- Barbarian Rugby Club
