= Patrick Estève =

France international rugby union player

Patrick Estève (born Lavelanet, 14 February 1959) is a former French rugby union player and a current coach. He played as a wing. He was nicknamed TGV.

He first played at Carcassonne, which he joined in 1964, aged only 5 years old, and would join the first team in 1975. He joined Stade Lavelanétien for the season of 1979/80. He had his most successful years at RC Narbonne, where he played from 1980/81 to 1986/87. He won the Challenge Yves du Manoir in 1984. After leaving RC Narbonne, he played for Castelnaudary in the minor leagues.

He had 25 caps for France, from 1982 to 1987, scoring 12 tries, 48 points on aggregate. He played at the Five Nations Championship in 1983, 1984, 1985 and 1986. He had 14 caps, scoring 8 tries, 32 points on aggregate. He was the top try scorer at the 1983 Five Nations Championship, scoring 5 tries, including one in each game. He was called for the 1987 Rugby World Cup, playing in two games and scoring a try.

After finishing his player career, he became a coach. He was president and coach of Stade Lavelanétien from 1997 to 1999.
