= David Pickering (rugby union) =

Wales international rugby union footballer

- Born: David Francis Pickering; 16 December 1960 (age 65) Briton Ferry, Wales
- Height: 6 ft 2 in (1.88 m)
- Weight: 14 st 10 lb (93 kg)

Rugby union career
- Position: Flanker
Amateur team(s)
Years	Team	Apps	(Points)
1978-1988	Llanelli RFC	207	(160)
–	Neath RFC		
International career
Years	Team	Apps	(Points)
1983–1987	Wales	23	(12)

David Francis Pickering (born 16 December 1960) is a rugby union administrator, coach and former player who played as a flanker for Llanelli RFC and Neath RFC. He played for Llanelli for a decade making over 200 appearances and scored 40 tries. He won 23 caps for the Wales national team between 1983 and 1987, and captained the national team on eight occasions.

Pickering went on to coach Neath RFC for five years before becoming Team Manager of the Wales A team and subsequently the Wales national team. He later became Chairman of the Welsh Rugby Union (WRU), the board of the Millennium Stadium and a member of the International Rugby Board Council. He spent 5 years as Director of the Rugby World Cup. A recent profile noted that he nearly died playing against Fiji.
