= Jean-Pierre Rives =

France international rugby union player (born 1952)

- Known for: Painting, steel sculpture
- Notable work: Ribbons of Memory
- Movement: Abstract expressionism (painting), minimalism (sculpture)
- Awards: Officier de l'Ordre national du Mérite; Officier de l'Ordre national de la Legion d'honneur

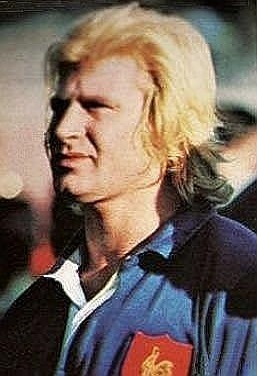
- Jean-Pierre Rives in 1981
- Born: 31 December 1952 (age 73) Toulouse, France
- Height: 1.78 m (5 ft 10 in)
- Weight: 85 kg (13 st 5 lb)

Rugby union career
- Position: Flanker
Amateur team(s)
Years	Team	Apps	(Points)
1967–1972	TOEC		
1972–1974	Stade Beaumontois		
1974–1981	Stade Toulousain		
1981–1986	Racing Club de France		
- Correct as of 4 August 2012
International career
Years	Team	Apps	(Points)
1975–1984	France	59	(20)
- Correct as of 4 August 2012

Jean-Pierre Rives (born 31 December 1952) is a French former rugby union player and visual artist. "A cult figure in France", according to the BBC, he came to epitomise the team's spirit and "ultra-committed, guts-and-glory style of play". He won 59 caps for France – 34 of them as captain – and was inducted into the International Rugby Hall of Fame. After retiring from the sport, Rives concentrated entirely on his art. He is both a painter and a sculptor, and exhibiting regularly at prominent public venues all over the globe. Rives was awarded the Order of the Legion of Honor and the National Order of Merit by the government of France.

== Early life and career ==
Jean-Pierre Rives was born on 31 December 1952 in Saint-Simon, a suburb of Toulouse, in the Haute-Garonne, Occitan departement of southwestern France. He grew up with his brother Philippe in the family of Jo and Lydia Rives. Jean-Pierre started drawing and painting in primary school – a passion that would stay with him throughout his whole life. His father was a pilot and an avid tennis player, and he encouraged his son, who excelled in athletics at early age, to pursue tennis, but it was rugby that would become Jean-Pierre Rives' ultimate choice.

== Rugby ==
Rives began playing rugby for his hometown club in 1974. Even though he was considered to be too small to play as flanker, standing at 5 ft 10 in (178 cm), he decisively proved the doubters wrong, and it was not long until his unmistakable talent gained attention from the national selectors. Rives made his France debut against England in 1975, at the age of 22, marking the start of an international career that would take him to the very top in terms of both personal and team achievements.

Jean-Pierre Rives was instrumental in helping France to the Grand Slam in 1977 and was installed as French captain during the 1978 season. He played for TOEC, Beaumont and Stade Toulousain, then in 1981 left Toulouse to join Racing Club de France. During Rives' rugby career, the essence of his game was to be always close to the ball, in the thick of the action. He was dubbed the Casque d'or (French for "Golden helmet") due to his long and wild blond hair. Roger Couderc, the iconic voice of rugby on French TV of the time, came up with this nickname that stuck with Rives throughout his entire career. It was his hair, along with his bravery, which also brought him the nickname Asterix.

Rives captained France in 34 games, a world record at the time, and played in the teams which completed the Grand Slam in the (then) Five Nations Championship in 1977 and 1981. Rives also captained the first French side to beat the All Blacks in New Zealand. He also played for a World XV on 9 August 1980 against Argentina in Buenos Aires, losing 36–22. Rives would have his career ended by a succession of shoulder injuries in 1984. His final match for France came in that year's Five Nations defeat to Scotland at Murrayfield.

In 2000, a documentary feature film entitled L'Empreinte des champions: Jean-Pierre Rives (The Mark of the Champions: Jean-Pierre Rives) was released and made headlines. The reviews were largely positive, but there were detractors as well. The loudest criticism came from Libération, which found the documentary to be "evocative of a hagiography about a member of the Politburo, released by the Soviet news media". "Altruism, courage, charisma, generosity, moral strength, humility – it's all there," lamented the left leaning French daily.

Jean-Pierre Rives was influential in France's bid to host the 2007 Rugby World Cup, and played a part in the trophy presentation following the tournament's final. One of his sculptures is now a part of the French rugby calendar, after he was asked in 2007 to design the Giuseppe Garibaldi Trophy. The trophy is awarded annually to the winner of the Six Nations match between France and Italy. Also in 2007, Roselyne Bachelot, the French Minister of Health, inaugurated a new Sports Center in Courbevoie, a suburb of Paris. To honor Rives' brilliant achievements, the spacious new 272000 square foot Sports Complex was named Espace Jean-Pierre Rives.

A "legend", according to the BBC, and "a blood-stained hero [who] remains an iconic presence to fans the world over", according to ESPN, Jean-Pierre Rives' fame transcends sport. He has been an inspiration and a role model for fans across generational and cultural lines."I marvel at the emergence of an artist like Jean-Pierre Rives," wrote the prize winning French author Antoine Blondin. Other admirers included architect Jean Nouvel, who admits to not being a sports enthusiast, television personality Maïtena Biraben, who calls him "her idol," and actor Hugh Jackman, who said of him, "I was pretty obsessed with rugby player Jean-Pierre Rives. A small guy on the field, he finished every game with blood on face."

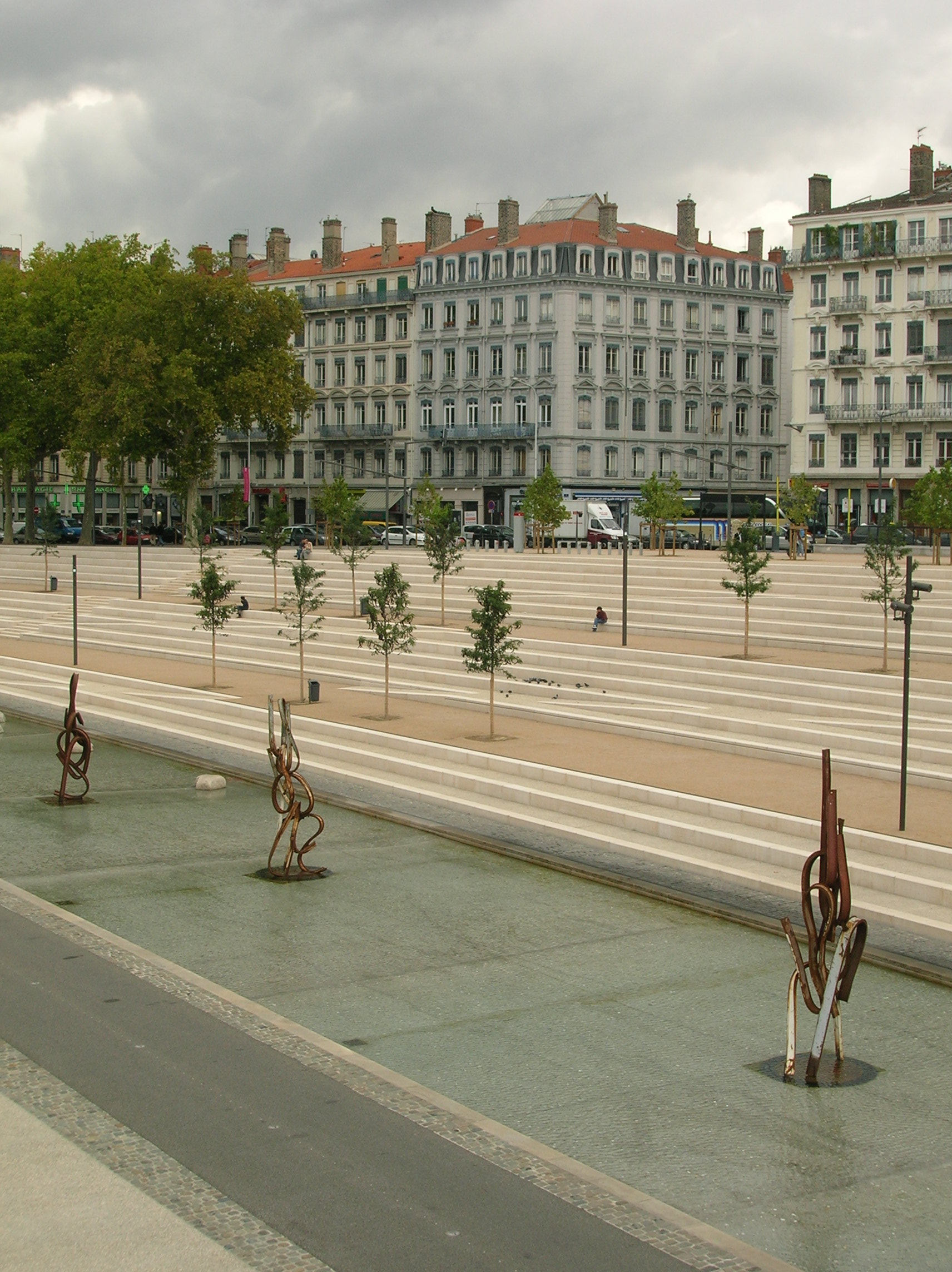
Exhibition Rives sur Berges in Lyon, France, 2007

== Art ==
Sculpture is just invention and energy, and rugby is energy too, and invention sometimes."

– Jean-Pierre Rives.

Jean-Pierre Rives turned to art full-time after his retirement from rugby in 1984. Art had been his passion since early boyhood, and he immersed himself in it with dedication that soon earned him critical acclaim. Rives' chosen media became painting and sculpture, which he took up when he was still a rugby player, after meeting a well-known French sculptor and Prix de Rome winner, Albert Feraud. The two men found a commonality of aesthetics, and Rives moved to a house not far away from Feraud's home in Bagneux. Many of Rives' earlier sculptures were created in Feraud's atelier, where both artists worked side by side. "He invited me to his studio, and I never got out," Rives told Hugh Schofield of the BBC. Rives considers Albert Feraud a great man and an inspiration. Another artist that inspired Rives' work is a Polish-born French painter Ladislas Kijno.

The bond between art and sport feels natural to Rives, as he believes that art and rugby can be interconnected, and emotions are found in both. "In sports you make movement and you are maybe sculpting or painting in the space with your body," he told Clara Iaccarino of the Sydney Morning Herald. "In art you use instruments. Art is just energy, you have to do it; it has to come out." He works in a disused railway shed in the north of Paris, where he forms and twists his found steel, manipulating the shapes created by the resulting positive and negative spaces. He cuts the beams strategically to form complex compositions in which the hardness of the steel forms a powerful juxtaposition to the soft curves. Rives' sculptures were called by the French La Dépêche du Midi "a marvelous mixture of suffering, grace and beauty".

Rives sees his paintings as the two-dimensional reflections of his sculptures. He uses the word "impression" to describe both the technique and the philosophy applied to his canvases. The impression is made by a mark or an indentation created by pressure, as if his sculptures were dipped in tar and paint and then pressed onto the surface of a canvas. This term "impression" also alludes to the effect the paintings produce on the viewer, and the feelings they evoke.

Jean-Pierre Rives' sculptures have been showcased at public venues around the world including the prestigious Jardin du Luxembourg in Paris, a stone's throw from the classical Senate building, in 2002. This installation marked the first time sculptures were exhibited there since Auguste Rodin's exhibition more than a century ago. A widely attended and written about vernissage attracted many of France's powerful political and business leaders and, according to the influential Le Point, included "a pack of Rives' elite" – friends and collectors all – Serge Kampf, founder of Capgemini, Claude Bébéar, founder of Axa, Henri Lachmann, CEO of Schneider Electric, Jean-René Fourtou, Chairman of Vivendi, Pierre Dauzier, President of Havas and Thierry Breton Chairman of France Télécom and future Finance Minister. Other large scale shows included the annual Sculpture by the Sea exhibition in Sydney, Australia, in 2007, an exhibition in the historically important Royal Park in Brussels, Belgium, in 2009, an exhibition in the 18th century sculpture garden Le Grand Rond in Toulouse, France, in 2010, an installation on the Dag Hammarskjold Plaza in Manhattan, New York, in 2010, and a large-scale installation at the Musée des Jacobins in Auch, France in 2014, to name a few.

Jean-Pierre Rives' work is found in numerous private and public collections throughout the globe, including Musée du quai Branly in Paris, Musee d'Art Moderne de la Ville de Paris, also in Paris, and Asago Art Village Museum and Sculpture Garden in Asago, Japan, among many others. He is represented in the U.S. by the Serge Sorokko Gallery.

== Personal life ==
Jean-Pierre Rives met his first wife, an American model and singer/songwriter Jennifer Taylor, in Paris, in the early 1980s. The marriage ended in a divorce. He has since remarried and fathered two sons – Jasper and Kino-Jean. Rives and his wife, Sonia, split their time between Ibiza and St-Tropez.

== Awards and honors ==
- 1980/1981: Pat Marshall Memorial Award from the Rugby Union Writers' Club
- 1981: Prix Henry Deutsch de la Meurthe from the French Academy of Sports
- 1986: Officer of the Order of the Legion of Honor
- 1997: Inductee of the International Rugby Hall of Fame
- 2001: Prix Alain Danet from the French Academy of Sports
- 2009: Officer of the National Order of Merit

== Filmography ==
=== Films ===
- The Gaul (2001) as Teuton Chief
- Connemara (1990) as Morhoult
- Qui sont mes juges? (1987) as Jean-Pierre

=== Television ===
- La traversée du miroir (TV series, 2011) as himself
- 13 heures le journal (TV series, 2007) as himself
- 7 sur 7 (TV series, 1984) as himself
