= Gary Pearce (rugby union) =

England international rugby union player

- Born: Gary Stephen Pearce; 2 March 1956 (age 70) Dinton, Buckinghamshire, England

Rugby union career
- Position: Prop
Senior career
Years	Team	Apps	(Points)
- Northampton Saints
International career
Years	Team	Apps	(Points)
1979–1991	England	36	(0)

Gary Stephen Pearce (born Dinton, 2 March 1956) is a former English rugby union player. He played as a prop.

He played for Northampton Saints.

Pearce had 36 caps for England, from 1979 to 1991, without ever scoring. His first game was a 7–7 draw with Scotland, at 3 February 1979, in Twickenham, for the 1979 Five Nations Championship, aged 22 years old. He was called for the 1987 Rugby World Cup, playing three games. After a three-year absence, he was called once more for the 1991 Rugby World Cup. His only game would be his last cap, the 37–9 win over United States, at 11 October 1991, in Twickenham. He was then 35 years old. He played seven times at the Five Nations Championship, in 1979, 1982, 1983, 1984, 1985, 1986 and 1987, but was never able to win it.
