= Ciaran Fitzgerald =

Irish former rugby union player (born 1952)

- Born: Loughrea, Ireland
- Height: 1.75 m (5 ft 9 in)
- Weight: 86 kg (13 st 8 lb; 190 lb)
- School: Garbally College
- University: University College Galway
- Notable relative(s): Derry Fitzgerald (Brigadier General, Irish Army) Ronan Hickey (Irish lawyer and Public Servant)
- Occupation: Irish Army Officer

Rugby union career
- Position: Hooker
Amateur team(s)
Years	Team	Apps	(Points)
- UCG
–	St Mary's College		
Provincial / State sides
Years	Team	Apps	(Points)
1972–1987	Connacht	39	(4)
International career
Years	Team	Apps	(Points)
1979–1986	Ireland	25	(4)
1983	British and Irish Lions	4	(0)
Coaching career
- Years: Team
- 1990–1992: Ireland

Ciaran Fitzgerald is an Irish former rugby union player. He captained Ireland to the Triple Crown in 1982 and 1985, and the Five Nations Championship in 1983. Fitzgerald also captained the Lions on their 1983 tour. After the conclusion of his playing career, Fitzgerald was coach of the national team.

== Early life ==
Fitzgerald was born in Loughrea, County Galway.

== Rugby career ==
Fitzgerald first played rugby while at Garbally College, and was chosen to play hooker by teacher and priest John Kirby. Fitzgerald played for University College Galway, and then went on to play senior rugby for St Mary's College in Dublin.

Fitzgerald rose to prominence in the game, and made his test debut for Ireland against Australia on 3 June 1979, during an Irish tour of Australia. He captained Ireland to the Triple Crown in 1982 and 1985, and the Five Nations Championship in 1983. Fitzgerald's last test came against Scotland on 15 March 1986 in that year's Five Nations Championship. In total, Fitzgerald received 22 competitive and three friendly caps for Ireland. He scored once, a try against Wales, in the 1980 Five Nations. Fitzgerald also captained the British and Irish Lions team on their 1983 tour, when the team travelled to New Zealand and were beaten in each test against the All Blacks.

== Other activities ==
Though most widely remembered for playing rugby union, Fitzgerald was an accomplished sportsman, winning two All-Ireland boxing championships. He also played minor hurling for Galway the team he played with reached the minor final against Cork in 1970.

Fitzgerald studied at University College Galway, gaining a Bachelor's degree in 1973. Playing in the amateur era, Fitzgerald also maintained a career in the Irish Army. Fitzgerald also served as aide-de-camp to the President, Dr Patrick Hillery.

== Coaching and media ==
Following his retirement from playing, Fitzgerald has continued to be involved in the game, and served as head coach of Ireland from 1990 to 1992, leading the side to the 1991 Rugby World Cup, where they reached the quarter-finals.

He has also had a career in media, appearing on Setanta Sports and RTÉ, the Irish national TV and radio service, as a rugby pundit.

== Appearances ==
- 1979: Australia W 27–12 Brisbane
- 1979: Australia W 9–3 Sydney
- 1980: England L 24–9 Twickenham
- 1980: Scotland W 22–15 Lansdowne Road
- 1980: France L 19–18 Parc des Princes
- 1980: Wales W 21–7 Lansdowne Road
- 1982: Wales W 20–12 Lansdowne Road
- 1982: England W 16–15 Twickenham
- 1982: Scotland W 21–12 Lansdowne Road
- 1982: France L 22–9 Parc des Princes
- 1983: Scotland W 15–13 Murrayfield
- 1983: France W 22–16 Lansdowne Road
- 1983: Wales L 23–9 Cardiff Arms Park
- 1983: England W 25–15 Lansdowne Road
- 1984: France L 25–12 Parc des Princes
- 1984: Wales L 18–9 Lansdowne Road
- 1984: Australia L 16–9 Lansdowne Road
- 1985: Scotland W 18–15 Murrayfield
- 1985: France D 15–15 Lansdowne Road
- 1985: Wales W 21–9 Cardiff Arms Park
- 1985: England W 13–10 Lansdowne Road
- 1986: France L 29–9 Parc des Princes
- 1986: Wales L 19–12 Lansdowne Road
- 1986: England L 25–20 Twickenham
- 1986: Scotland L 10–9 Lansdowne Road

Preceded by Jim Davidson	Irish national rugby coach 1990–1992	Succeeded by Gerry Murphy
