= Trevor Ringland =

Co-Chairman of the NI Conservatives
- In office 28 June 2013 – 2 July 2014 Serving with Irwin Armstrong
- Preceded by: Position created

Personal details
- Born: 13 November 1959 (age 67) Belfast, Northern Ireland, UK
- Party: NI Conservatives (since 2010); UUP (until 2010)
- Spouse: Colleen Ringland
- Children: 3
- Education: Larne Grammar School
- Alma mater: Queen's University Belfast
- Occupation: Politician; solicitor; rugby player

Rugby union career
- Position: Wing
Senior career
Years	Team	Apps	(Points)
- Ballymena RFC
Provincial / State sides
Years	Team	Apps	(Points)
- Ulster
International career
Years	Team	Apps	(Points)
1981–1988	Ireland	31	(41)
1983	British & Irish Lions	4	

Trevor Maxwell Ringland, MBE (born 13 November 1959) is a Northern Irish solicitor, former rugby union player and unionist politician. From June 2013 to July 2014, he served as co-chairman of the NI Conservatives. After attending Larne Grammar School, he read law at Queen's University Belfast. He is a spokesperson for the unionist campaign group Uniting UK.

== Rugby career ==
Ringland made 31 competitive appearances for Ireland, scoring nine tries. The majority of his appearances came in the Five Nations, with the remainder coming in the 1987 Rugby World Cup. He also represented Ulster and Ballymena.

In 1983 he toured New Zealand with the British & Irish Lions. Since retirement, he has coached at Ballymena and been a committee member of the Irish Rugby Football Union.

In his later years he joined Belfast Club CIYMS where he played for the golden oldies 4th xv, known as the Dream Team, consisting of former senior players. The team was managed by Tommy Andrews the former hooker and current club chairman. Another notable player on the team was Rab Irwin who went on to win the European Cup with Ulster.

== Career outside sport ==
As rugby was an amateur sport during his career, Ringland is also a full-time solicitor for Macaulay and Ritchie. In 2006 he was appointed as a member of the new Northern Ireland Policing Board. His Policing Board profile states he is a director of Independent News & Media, Mediation Northern Ireland and The Ireland Funds.

Ringland is also active with Peace Players International, an organisation devoted to promote inter-religious unity in Belfast through sport. Ringland and David Cullen won the 2007 ESPY Arthur Ashe for Courage Award.

Ringland was awarded an MBE for services to the community in Northern Ireland in the New Year Honours 2009.

== Political career ==
Ringland was vice-chairman of the Ulster Unionist Party's East Belfast Branch. On 24 February 2010 Ringland was adopted by the Ulster Unionist Party and Conservative Party as their joint Ulster Conservatives and Unionists candidate in East Belfast for the 2010 General Election. He came third with 21.2%.

In September 2010, Ringland became involved in a controversy over the new leader of Ulster Unionist Party, Tom Elliott. Upon Elliott's election as party leader, Ringland publicly asked the new leader if he would be prepared to attend a Gaelic Football All-Ireland Final in Dublin if an Ulster team were to take part; Elliott refused, stating that attending a sporting event on a Sunday would conflict with his religious views. On 4 October 2010, Ringland resigned from the Ulster Unionist Party, he later joined the NI Conservatives.

=== NI Conservatives ===
In 2012 he was appointed vice-chairman (Political) of the NI Conservatives, and as the Party's spokesperson for social development, culture and leisure. At the Party's AGM in Belfast on 28 June 2013, it was confirmed he was appointed as co-chairman of the NI Conservatives, serving alongside Irwin Armstrong, and primarily responsible for the Party's political brief.
