= Serge Blanco =

French rugby union player (born 1958)

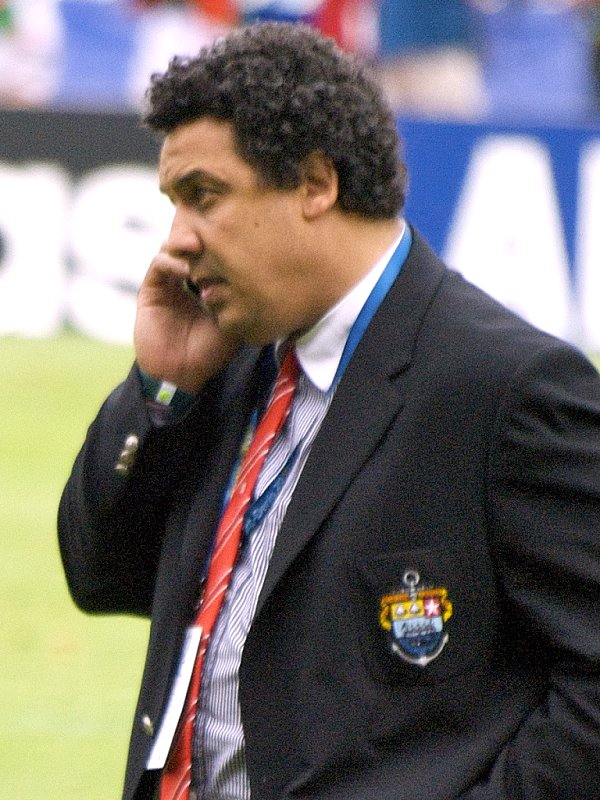
- Born: 31 August 1958 (age 68) Caracas, Venezuela
- Occupation(s): President: Biarritz Olympique; Owner of Groupe Serge Blanco; Partner of the Brand Serge Blanco; Administration council of Biarritz Olympique

Rugby union career
- Position: Fullback or wing
Amateur team(s)
Years	Team	Apps	(Points)
1974–1992	Biarritz		
International career
Years	Team	Apps	(Points)
1980–1991	France	93	(233)

Serge Blanco (born 31 August 1958) is a former rugby union rugby player who played fullback for Biarritz Olympique and the French national side, gaining 93 caps, 81 of them at fullback. His alternative position was wing. He was generally nicknamed by French rugby fans as the Pelé of Rugby.

Blanco was born in Caracas, Venezuela, to a Venezuelan father and a Basque mother, and was raised in Biarritz, France. He made his international debut against South Africa at Loftus Versfeld Stadium on 8 November 1980, which France lost 37–15.

== Playing career ==
He scored the deciding try in the semi-final of the inaugural Rugby World Cup in 1987, France winning 30–24 against co-hosts Australia. He also won Grand Slams with France in the 1981 and 1987 Five Nations Championship.

Serge Blanco captained the French side in the 1991 Rugby World Cup before retiring after their quarter-final defeat by England on 19 October 1991. He won a total of 93 caps (a record at the time) and held the record alone for the most tries scored for France until Damian Penaud equalled it in March 2025 and surpassed it in November 2025. He remains second on the all-time try-scorer list.

Despite his international success he has failed to win the national championship with his club Biarritz Olympique, despite making a final appearance in 1992. This match against Toulon was his last first-class rugby union match. In 1997 Serge Blanco was among the inaugural set of rugby players inducted into the International Rugby Hall of Fame. In 2011, he was also inducted into the IRB Hall of Fame.

== Administration ==
After retiring as a player, he continued serving Biarritz Olympique as their president. In this role he saw his club become French champions in 2002 and 2006. He was president of France's national professional league, Ligue Nationale de Rugby, until December 2008. He owns a chain of hotels and has given his name to a men's clothing brand.

In March 2009 he suffered a heart attack but recovered after surgery.

== See also ==
- International Rugby Hall of Fame
- IRB Hall of Fame
- List of rugby union test caps leaders

== References and notes ==
- Bath, Richard, ed. (1997). Complete Book of Rugby. Seven Oaks Ltd. ISBN 1-86200-013-1.
