= 1980 Five Nations Championship squads =

Rugby union competition squads

== England ==
Head coach: Mike Davis

1. Bill Beaumont (c.)
2. Phil Blakeway
3. Tony Bond
4. John Carleton
5. Maurice Colclough
6. Fran Cotton
7. Paul Dodge
8. Dusty Hare
9. John Horton
10. Nigel Horton
11. Tony Neary
12. Nick Preston
13. Mike Rafter
14. John Scott
15. Mike Slemen
16. Steve Smith
17. Roger Uttley
18. Peter Wheeler
19. Clive Woodward

== France ==
Head coach: Jean Desclaux

1. Jean-Michel Aguirre
2. Jean-Luc Averous
3. Roland Bertranne
4. Daniel Bustaffa
5. Manuel Carpentier
6. Alain Caussade
7. Michel Clémente
8. Didier Codorniou
9. Frédéric Costes
10. Philippe Dintrans
11. Pierre Dospital
12. Yves Duhard
13. Serge Gabernet
14. Jérôme Gallion
15. Jean-François Gourdon
16. Francis Haget
17. Jean-Luc Joinel
18. Alain Maleig
19. Jean-François Marchal
20. Alain Paco
21. Robert Paparemborde
22. Pierre Pedeutour
23. Jean-Pierre Rives (c.)
24. Patrick Salas
25. Armand Vaquerin

== Ireland ==
Head coach: Tom Kiernan

1. Ian Burns
2. Ollie Campbell
3. Willie Duggan
4. Ciaran Fitzgerald
5. Mick Fitzpatrick
6. Brendan Foley
7. James Glennon
8. David Irwin
9. Moss Keane
10. Terry Kennedy
11. Alistair McKibbin
12. Freddie McLennan
13. Ginger McLoughlin
14. Paul McNaughton
15. John Moloney
16. Kevin O'Brien
17. Rodney O'Donnell
18. John O'Driscoll
19. Phil Orr
20. Colin Patterson
21. Fergus Slattery (c.)
22. Donal Spring
23. Colm Tucker

== Scotland ==
Head coach: Jim Telfer

1. John Beattie
2. Mike Biggar (c.)*
3. Alex Brewster
4. James Burnett
5. Bill Cuthbertson
6. Colin Deans
7. Gordon Dickson
8. Brian Gossman
9. David Gray
10. Bruce Hay
11. Andy Irvine (c.)**
12. David Johnston
13. Roy Laidlaw
14. Kenneth Lawrie
15. Alan Lawson
16. David Leslie
17. Iain Milne
18. Steve Munro
19. Jim Renwick
20. Keith Robertson
21. Norrie Rowan
22. John Rutherford
23. Alan Tomes

* captain in the first three games
** captain in the last game

== Wales ==
Head coach: John Lloyd

1. Roger Blyth
2. Eddie Butler
3. Gareth Davies
4. Steve Fenwick
5. Terry Holmes
6. Les Keen
7. Stuart Lane
8. Allan Martin
9. Peter Morgan
10. Alan Phillips
11. Graham Price
12. Elgan Rees
13. David Richards
14. Paul Ringer
15. Jeff Squire (c.)
16. Geoff Wheel
17. Clive Williams
