= 1979 Five Nations Championship squads =

Rugby union competition squads

== England ==
Head coach: Peter Colston

1. Bill Beaumont
2. Neil Bennett
3. Tony Bond
4. Richard Cardus
5. Robin Cowling
6. Paul Dodge
7. Alastair Hignell
8. Nigel Horton
9. Peter Kingston
10. Tony Neary
11. Gary Pearce
12. Mike Rafter
13. John Scott
14. Mike Slemen
15. Colin Smart
16. Peter Squires
17. Roger Uttley (c.)
18. Peter Wheeler
19. Malcolm Young

== France ==
Head coach: Jean Desclaux

1. Roger Aguerre
2. Jean-Michel Aguirre
3. Christian Bélascain
4. Roland Bertranne
5. Louis Bilbao
6. Alain Caussade
7. Gérard Cholley
8. Frédéric Costes
9. Jérôme Gallion
10. Jean-François Gourdon
11. Alain Guilbert
12. Francis Haget
13. Jean-François Imbernon
14. Jean-Luc Joinel
15. Alain Maleig
16. Yves Malquier
17. Jean-François Marchal
18. Guy Noves
19. Alain Paco
20. Robert Paparemborde
21. Jean-Pierre Rives (c.)
22. Armand Vaquerin

== Ireland ==
Head coach: Noel Murphy

1. Willie Duggan
2. Ron Elliott
3. Moss Finn
4. Michael Gibson
5. Moss Keane
6. Terry Kennedy
7. Freddie McLennan
8. Ginger McLoughlin
9. Paul McNaughton
10. Alistair McKibbin
11. Phil Orr
12. Colin Patterson
13. Fergus Slattery (c.)
14. Dick Spring
15. Harold Steele
16. Colm Tucker
17. Tony Ward
18. Pa Whelan

== Scotland ==
Head coach: Nairn McEwan

1. Mike Biggar
2. Bob Cunningham
3. Colin Deans
4. Gordon Dickson
5. David Gray
6. Bruce Hay
7. Andy Irvine
8. Iain Lambie
9. Alan Lawson
10. Ian McLauchlan
11. Ian McGeechan (c.)
12. Alastair McHarg
13. Iain Milne
14. Jim Renwick
15. Keith Robertson
16. John Rutherford
17. Alan Tomes
18. Bill Watson

== Wales ==
Head coach: John Dawes

1. Barry Clegg
2. Gareth Davies
3. Charlie Faulkner
4. Steve Fenwick
5. Ray Gravell
6. Clive Griffiths
7. Terry Holmes
8. Allan Martin
9. Alan Phillips
10. Graham Price
11. Derek Quinnell
12. Elgan Rees
13. David Richards
14. Paul Ringer
15. Mike Roberts
16. Jeff Squire
17. J. J. Williams
18. J. P. R. Williams (c.)
19. Bobby Windsor
