= 1979 France rugby union tour of Fiji and New Zealand =

Summary
P	W	D	L
Total
11	8	0	3
Test match
4	3	0	1
Opponent
P	W	D	L
Fiji
1	1	0	0
New Zealand
2	1	0	1
Tahiti
1	1	0	0

The 1979 France rugby union tour of Fiji New Zealand Tahiti was a series of ten matches played in June and July 1979 by the France national rugby union team in Fiji, New Zealand and Tahiti. The team won seven matches and lost three, including defeats to provincial teams Waikato and Southland. They drew their two-match test series against the New Zealand national rugby union team, losing the first test but winning the second. The victory in the second test was France's first away victory against New Zealand, gained at the eighth attempt.

== Results ==
Scores and results list France's points tally first.

	Date	Opponent	Location	Result	Score
Match 1	16 June	Fiji	Buckhurst Park, Suva	Won	13–4
Match 2	20 June	Marlborough	Lansdowne Park, Blenheim	Won	35–15
Match 3	23 June	Waikato	Rugby Park, Hamilton	Lost	15–18
Match 4	27 June	North Auckland	Okara Park, Whangārei	Won	16–3
Match 5	30 June	Wellington	Athletic Park, Wellington	Won	14–9
Match 6	3 July	Hawke's Bay	McLean Park, Napier	Won	31–13
Match 7	7 July	New Zealand	Lancaster Park, Christchurch	Lost	9–23
Match 8	10 July	Southland	Rugby Park, Invercargill	Lost	11–12
Match 9	14 July	New Zealand	Eden Park, Auckland	Won	24–19
Match 10	16 July	(French Polynesia) Tahiti	Papeete	Won	92–12

== Test matches ==
=== First Test ===
7 July 1979

New Zealand	23–9	France
B. Wilson (11 – 3pg, 1c); Wilson (4 – 1t); Donaldson (4 – 1t); Watts (4 – 1t)		(4 – 1t) Mesny (3 – 1dg) Caussade (2 – 1c) Aguirre

Lancaster Park, Christchurch
Attendance: 40,000
Referee: John West (IRFU)

NEW ZEALAND: Bevan Wilson, Stu Wilson, Bruce Robertson, Lyn Jaffray, Murray Watts, Murray Taylor, Mark Donaldson, Brad Johnstone, Andy Dalton, Gary Knight, Frank Oliver (rep Wayne Graham), Andy Haden, Leicester Rutledge, Gary Seear, Graham Mourie (c)

FRANCE: Jean-Michel Aguirre, Frédéric Costes, Didier Codorniou, Patrick Mesny, Jean-Luc Averous, Alain Caussade, Yves Lafarge, Robert Paparemborde, Philippe Dintrans, Guy Colomine, Francis Haget, Patrick Salas, Jean-Pierre Rives (c), Christian Béguerie, Jean-Luc Joinel.

=== Second Test ===
14 July 1979

New Zealand	19–24	France
B. Wilson (11 – 3pg, 1c); S. Wilson (4 – 1t); Mourie (4 – 1t)		(9 – 1t, 1c, 1dg) Caussade (4 – 1t) Gallion (4 – 1t) Averous (4 – 1t) Codorniou (3 – 1pg) Aguirre

Eden Park, Auckland
Attendance: 55,000
Referee: John West (IRFU)

NEW ZEALAND: Bevan Wilson, Stu Wilson, Bruce Robertson, Lyn Jaffray, Murray Watts, Murray Taylor, Mark Donaldson, Brad Johnstone, Andy Dalton, Gary Knight, Frank Oliver, Andy Haden, Leicester Rutledge, Gary Seear, Graham Mourie (c)

FRANCE: Jean-Michel Aguirre, Frédéric Costes, Didier Codorniou, Patrick Mesny, Jean-Luc Averous, Alain Caussade, Jérôme Gallion, Robert Paparemborde, Philippe Dintrans, Daniel Dubroca, Francis Haget, Alain Maleig, Jean-Pierre Rives (c), Patrick Salas, Jean-Luc Joinel.

== Touring party ==
- Manager: Yves Noe
- Assistant managers: Fernand Cazenave & Jean Desclaux
- Captain: Jean-Pierre Rives

=== Full backs ===
- Jean-Michel Aguirre (Bagnères)
- Serge Blanco (Biarritz)

=== Three-quarters ===
- Frédéric Costes (Montferrand)
- Jean-Luc Averous (La Voulte)
- Daniel Bustaffa (Carcassonne)
- Didier Codorniou (Narbonne)
- Patrick Mesny (Racing Club de France) – replacement during tour
- Michel Duffranc (Tyrosse)
- Laurent Pardo (Tarbes)

=== Half-backs ===
- Alain Caussade (Lourdes)
- Guy Laporte (Graulhet)
- Jérôme Gallion (Toulon)
- Yves Lafarge (Montferrand)

=== Forwards ===
- Yves Malquier (Narbonne)
- Christian Béguerie (Agen)
- Jean-Luc Joinel (Brive)
- Jean-Pierre Rives (Toulouse)
- Francis Haget (Biarritz)
- Patrick Salas (Narbonne)
- Jean-François Marchal (Lourdes)
- Alain Maleig (Oloron)
- Guy Colomine (Narbonne)
- Daniel Dubroca (Agen)
- Robert Paparemborde (Pau)
- Philippe Dintrans (Tarbes)
- Jean-François Perche (Bourg)
