= 1980 Five Nations Championship =

Rugby union competition

- Date: 19 January - 15 March 1980
- Countries: England; Ireland; France; Scotland; Wales

Tournament statistics
- Champions: England (18th title)
- Grand Slam: England (8th title)
- Triple Crown: England (15th title)
- Matches played: 10
- Tries scored: 40 (4 per match)
- Top point scorer: (Ireland) Ollie Campbell (46)
- Top try scorer: (England) John Carleton (4)

The 1980 Five Nations Championship was the 51st Five Nations Championship series of the annual rugby union competition contested by the national teams of England, France, Ireland, Scotland, and Wales. Including the previous incarnations as the Home Nations and Five Nations, this was the 86th series of the northern hemisphere rugby union championship. The tournament began on 19 January and concluded on 15 March.

England were the champions, winning the championship outright for the first time since 1963; they had also shared in the quintuple tie in 1973. It was England's 18th championship, excluding ten titles shared with other teams. In winning all four matches they won the Grand Slam for the eighth time, equalling the record held by Wales. It was England's first Grand Slam since 1957 and only their second since 1928. England's victories over Ireland, Wales and Scotland also gave them the Triple Crown for the first time since 1960 and the fifteenth time overall. Wales' close one point loss to England at Twickenham in a highly volatile match that took place during the 1980 British Steel strike, and Wales' later one-sided loss to Ireland at Lansdowne Road on the final weekend, signalled the end of Wales' glory days from the 1970s.

== Participants ==
The teams involved were:

Nation	Venue	City	Head coach	Captain
England	Twickenham	London	Mike Davis	Bill Beaumont
France	Parc des Princes	Paris	Jean Desclaux	Jean-Pierre Rives
Ireland	Lansdowne Road	Dublin	Tom Kiernan	Fergus Slattery
Scotland	Murrayfield	Edinburgh	Jim Telfer	Mike Biggar/Andy Irvine
Wales	National Stadium	Cardiff	John Lloyd	Jeff Squire

== Table ==
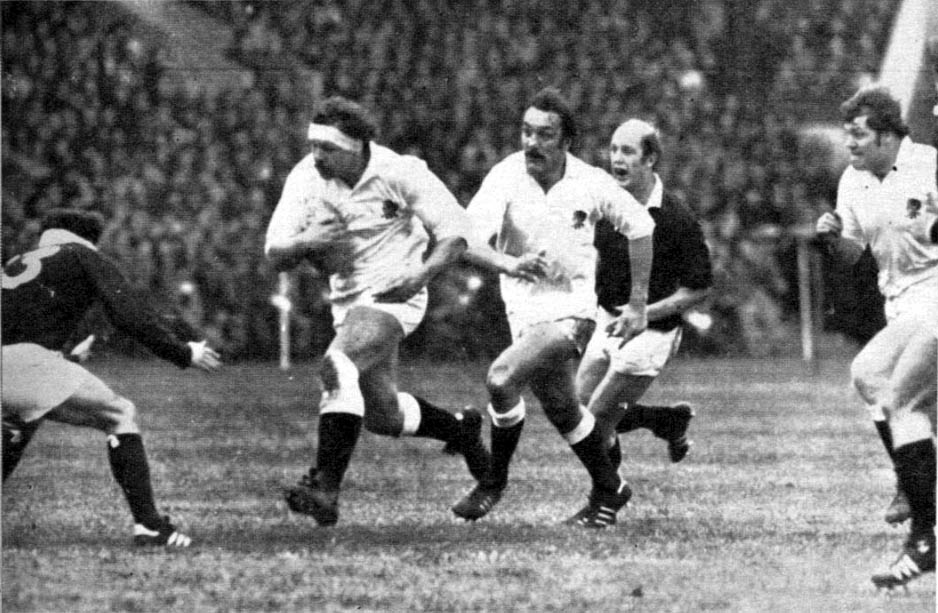
A moment of the last match, Scotland 18–30 England at Murrayfield Stadium

Pos	Team	Pld	W	D	L	PF	PA	PD	Pts
1	England	4	4	0	0	80	48	+32	8
2	Ireland	4	2	0	2	70	65	+5	4
2	Wales	4	2	0	2	50	45	+5	4
4	France	4	1	0	3	55	75	−20	2
4	Scotland	4	1	0	3	61	83	−22	2

== Results ==
19 January 1980

Wales	18–9	France
Tries: Holmes; Price; Rees; Richards; Con.: G. Davies		Tries: Marchal; Con.: Caussade; Drops: Caussade

National Stadium, Cardiff
Attendance: 53,749
Referee: Alan Hosie (Scotland)

19 January 1980

England	24–9	Ireland
Tries: Scott; Slemen; Smith; Con.: Hare (3); Pen.: Hare (2)		Pen.: Campbell (3)

Twickenham, London
Referee: C. Thomas (Wales)

2 February 1980

France	13–17	England
Tries: Averous; Rives; Con.: Caussade; Pen.: Caussade		Tries: Carleton; Preston; Pen.: Hare; Drops: Horton (2)

Parc des Princes, Paris
Attendance: 45,251
Referee: C. Norling (Wales)

2 February 1980

Ireland	22–15	Scotland
Tries: Keane; Kennedy; Con.: Campbell; Pen.: Campbell (3); Drops: Campbell		Tries: Johnston (2); Con.: Irvine (2); Pen.: Irvine

Lansdowne Road, Dublin
Referee: G. Chevrier (France)

16 February 1980

Scotland	22–14	France
Tries: Irvine (2); Rutherford; Con.: Irvine; Renwick; Pen.: Irvine (2)		Tries: Gabernet; Gallion; Pen.: Gabernet; Drops: Caussade

Murrayfield, Edinburgh
Attendance: 60,000
Referee: J. R. West (Ireland)

16 February 1980

England	9–8	Wales
Pen.: Hare (3)		Tries: Rees; Squire

Twickenham, London
Referee: D. I. H. Burnett (Ireland)

1 March 1980

France	19–18	Ireland
Tries: Gourdon (2); Con.: Aguirre; Pen.: Aguirre (2); Drops: Pedeutour		Tries: McLennan; Con.: Campbell; Pen.: Campbell (3); Drops: Campbell

Parc des Princes, Paris
Attendance: 45,239
Referee: Alan Hosie (Scotland)

1 March 1980

Wales	17–6	Scotland
Tries: Holmes; Keen; Richards; Con.: Blyth; Pen.: Fenwick		Tries: Renwick; Con.: Irvine

National Stadium, Cardiff
Referee: L. M. Prideaux (England)

15 March 1980

Ireland	21–7	Wales
Tries: Fitzgerald; Irwin; O'Driscoll; Con.: Campbell (3); Pen.: Campbell		Tries: Blyth; Pen.: Fenwick

Lansdowne Road, Dublin
Referee: L. M. Prideaux (England)

15 March 1980

Scotland	18–30	England
Tries: Rutherford; Tomes; Con.: Irvine (2); Pen.: Irvine (2)		Tries: Carleton (3); Slemen; Smith; Con.: Hare (2); Pen.: Hare (2)

Murrayfield, Edinburgh
Referee: J. P. Bonnet (France)
