= 1976 Five Nations Championship =

Rugby union competition

- Date: 10 January - 20 March 1976
- Countries: England; Ireland; France; Scotland; Wales

Tournament statistics
- Champions: Wales (19th title)
- Grand Slam: Wales (7th title)
- Triple Crown: Wales (13th title)
- Matches played: 10
- Tries scored: 30 (3 per match)
- Top point scorer: (Wales) Phil Bennett (38)
- Top try scorer: (Wales) Gareth Edwards (3)

The 1976 Five Nations Championship was the 47th series of the rugby union Five Nations Championship. Including the previous incarnations as the Home Nations and Five Nations, this was the 82nd series of the northern hemisphere rugby union championship. Ten matches were played between 10 January and 20 March 1976.

Wales won their 19th title, with a Grand Slam, and the Triple Crown. The victory consolidated Wales’s dominance during the 1970s, a decade in which they secured three Grand Slams and five championships.

The Scotland vs France match was played one week earlier than the England vs Wales fixture, allowing the BBC to cover both that game and the Ireland vs Australia test in Dublin on the same day. Bill Mclaren thus, unusually, commentated on the opening two games of a Five Nations Championship for the first time since the two games per weekend format was introduced in 1974.

== Participants ==
Nation	Venue	City	Head coach	Captain
England	Twickenham	London	Peter Colston	Tony Neary
France	Parc des Princes	Paris	Jean Desclaux	Jacques Fouroux
Ireland	Lansdowne Road	Dublin	Roly Meates	Mike Gibson
Scotland	Murrayfield	Edinburgh	Bill Dickinson	Ian McLauchlan
Wales	National Stadium	Cardiff	John Dawes	Mervyn Davies

== Table ==
Pos	Team	Pld	W	D	L	PF	PA	PD	Pts
1	Wales	4	4	0	0	102	37	+65	8
2	France	4	3	0	1	82	37	+45	6
3	Scotland	4	2	0	2	49	59	−10	4
4	Ireland	4	1	0	3	31	87	−56	2
5	England	4	0	0	4	42	86	−44	0

== Results ==
10 January 1976

Scotland	6–13	France
Pen: Renwick; Drop: Morgan		Try: Dubertrand; Pen: Romeu (3)

Murrayfield Stadium, Edinburgh
Attendance: 55,000
Referee: K. A. Pattinson (England)

17 January 1976

England	9–21	Wales
Pen: Hignell (3)		Try: Edwards; J. P. R. Williams (2); Con: Fenwick (3); Pen: Martin

Twickenham Stadium, London
Referee: G. Domercq (France)

7 February 1976

France	26–3	Ireland
Try: Cholley; Fouroux; Pécune; Rives; Con: Bastiat; Romeu; Pen: Bastiat; Romeu		Pen: Robbie

Parc des Princes, Paris
Attendance: 42,585
Referee: A. Welsby (England)

7 February 1976

Wales	28–6	Scotland
Try: Edwards; Evans; J. J. Williams; Con: Bennett (2); Pen: Bennett (3); Drop: Fenwick		Try: Irvine; Con: Morgan

National Stadium, Cardiff
Referee: A. Cuny (France)

21 February 1976

Ireland	9–34	Wales
Pen: McGann (3)		Try: Bennett; Davies (2); Edwards; Con: Bennett (3); Pen: Bennett (3); Martin

Lansdowne Road, Dublin
Referee: N. Sanson (Scotland)

21 February 1976

Scotland	22–12	England
Try: Lawson (2); Leslie; Con: Irvine (2); Pen: Irvine (2)		Try: Maxwell; Con: Old; Pen: Old (2)

Murrayfield Stadium, Edinburgh
Attendance: 70,000
Referee: D. M. M. Lloyd (Wales)

6 March 1976

Wales	19–13	France
Try: J. J. Williams; Pen: Bennett (2); Fenwick (2); Martin		Try: Averous; Gourdon; Con: Romeu; Pen: Romeu

National Stadium, Cardiff
Attendance: 55,000
Referee: J. R. West (Ireland)

6 March 1976

England	12–13	Ireland
Pen: Old (4)		Try: Grace; Pen: McGann (2); Drop: McGann

Twickenham Stadium, London
Referee: Alan Hosie (Scotland)

20 March 1976

France	30–9	England
Try: Bastiat; Fouroux; Gourdon; Paparemborde (2); Romeu; Con: Romeu (3)		Try: Dixon; Con: Butler; Pen: Butler

Parc des Princes, Paris
Attendance: 43,611
Referee: K. H. Clark (Ireland)

20 March 1976

Ireland	6–15	Scotland
Pen: McGann (2)		Pen: Irvine (4); Drop: Wilson

Lansdowne Road, Dublin
Referee: M. S. Lewis (Wales)
