= 1978–79 French Rugby Union Championship =

French Rugby Championship 1978–79
- Countries: France
- Number of teams: 80 teams
- Champions: Narbonne (2nd title)
- Runners-up: Stade Bagnérais

The 1979–79 French Rugby Union Championship was won by Narbonne beating Stade Bagnérais in the final.

== Formula ==
The tournament was played by 80 clubs divided into two groups (A and B) of 40.

The "élite" (group A) was formed by four pools of ten clubs. The seven better of each pool (28 teams) were qualified for knockout stages, with four teams from group B.

== Qualification round ==
=== Group A ===
In bold the clubs qualified for the next round. The teams are listed according to the final ranking

**Pool A**

- **Béziers**
- **Touloun**
- **Graulhet**
- **Oloron**
- **Stade Bagnérais**
- **La Rochelle**
- **Aurillac**
- Auch
- Thuir
- Gaillac

**Pool C**

- **Toulouse**
- **RRC Nice**
- **Mazamet**
- **Lourdes**
- **Pau**
- **Agen**
- **Stadoceste**
- Tulle
- Castres
- Mont-de-Marsan

**Pool B**

- **Perpignan**
- **Brive**
- **ASM Clermont**
- **Romans**
- **Carcassonne**
- **Avignon Saint-Saturnin**
- **US Bressane**
- Racing
- Montauban
- Mauléon

**Pool D**

- **Narbonne**
- **Biarritz**
- **Bayonne**
- **Dax**
- **Valence**
- **Bourgoin-Jallieu**
- **Saint-Jean-de-Luz**
- Boucau
- Bègles
- Tyrosse

=== Group B ===
In bold the clubs qualified for the next round. The teams are listed according to the final ranking

**Pool E**

- **Grenoble**
- Stade Beaumontois
- Avenir sportif bédarridais (Bédarrides)
- Cahors
- Condom (Condom)
- Le Creusot
- Marmande
- Millau
- US Salles(Salles)
- US Vic-Bigorre

**Pool G**

- **USA Limoges**
- Albi
- Arras
- US Bergerac
- Carmaux
- Castelnaudary
- Mérignac
- Nîmes
- Saint-Claude
- Saint-Médard

**Pool F**

- **Périgueux**
- Castelsarrasin (Castelsarrasin)
- Chambéry
- US La Seyne
- La Voulte
- Lannemezan
- UA Mimizan (Mimizan)
- Orthez
- Paris Université
- Rodez (Rodez)

**Pool H**

- **Montchanin**
- Dijon
- Fumel
- La Teste
- Lombez Samatan
- Peyrehorade ([[P eyrehorade]])
- US Quillan Espéraza
- Saint-Girons
- SA Voiron (Voiron)
- Vichy

== Knockout stages ==
=== "Last 32" ===
In bold the clubs qualified for the next round

Team 1	Team 2	Results
**Toulouse**	Périgueux	18-10
**Valence**	Pau	28-4
**ASM Clermont**	US Bressane	15-12
**Touloun**	Bourgoin-Jallieu	45-21
Brive	**Stadoceste**	18-25
**Bayonne**	Saint-Jean-de-Luz	13-6
**Carcassonne**	Romans	18-6
**Narbonne**	Limoges	61-14
**Biarritz**	Aurillac	20-9
Mazamet	**Agen**	3-20
**Graulhet**	Dax	19-12
Perpignan	**Grenoble**	4-4
**Béziers**	Montchanin	30-3
Lourdes	**Stade Bagnérais**	9-18
**Oloron**	La Rochelle	3-0
**RRC Nice**	Avignon Saint-Saturnin	17-13

=== "Last 16" ===
In bold the clubs qualified for the next round

Team 1	Team 2	Results
**Toulouse**	Valence	7-3
**ASM Clermont**	Toulon	21-14
Stadoceste	**Bayonne**	10-29
Carcassonne	**Narbonne**	12-21
Biarritz	**Agen**	17-21
**Graulhet**	Grenoble	16-10
Béziers	**Stade Bagnérais**	6-9
Oloron	**RRC Nice**	22-23

=== Quarter of finals ===
In bold the clubs qualified for the next round

Team 1	Team 2	Results
Toulose	**ASM Clermont**	**10-12**
Bayonne	**Narbonne**	**7-18**
**Agen**	Graulhet	**13-9**
**Stade Bagnérais**	RRC Nice	**14-10**

=== Semifinals ===
Team 1	Team 2	Results
ASM Clermont	**Narbonne**	**9-19**
Agen	**Stade Bagnérais**	**9-25**

== Final ==
Teams	Narbonne - Stade Bagnérais
Score	10-0
Date	27 May 1979
Venue	Parc des Princes, Paris
Referee	Francis Palmade
Line-up
Narbonne	Guy Colomine, Pierre Salettes, Guy Martinez, Claude Spanghero, Patrick Salas, Michel Ponçot, Alain Montlaur, Yves Malquier, Guy Ramon, Lucien Pariès, Christian Trallero, Didier Codorniou, François Sangalli, Henri Ferrero, Jean-Michel Benacloï; Replacements : Daniel Trévisan, Joseph Provenzale, Pierre Bouisset, André Maratuech
Bagnères	Michel Laguerre-Basse, Antranik Torossian, Michel Urtizverea, Yves Duhard, Claude Pourtal, Claude Frutos, Serge Landais, André Cazenave, Adrien Mournet, Gérard Ara, Roland Anton, Pierre Rispal, Roland Bertranne, Jean-François Gourdon, Jean-Michel Aguirre; Replacements : René Vergez, Gérard Chevallier, Michel Aragnouet, Pierre Domec, Francis Meirhaegue
Scorers
Narbonne	1 try Trallero, 2 penalties Pariés
Bagnères
