= 1978 Five Nations Championship =

Rugby union competition

- Date: 21 January - 18 March 1978
- Countries: England; Ireland; France; Scotland; Wales

Tournament statistics
- Champions: Wales (20th title)
- Grand Slam: Wales (8th title)
- Triple Crown: Wales (15th title)
- Matches played: 10
- Tries scored: 24 (2.4 per match)
- Top point scorer: (Ireland) Tony Ward (38)
- Top try scorer: (France) Jérôme Gallion (3)

The 1978 Five Nations Championship was the forty-ninth series of the rugby union Five Nations Championship. Including the previous incarnations as the Home Nations and Five Nations, this was the eighty-fourth series of the northern hemisphere rugby union championship. Ten matches were played between 21 January and 18 March. The tournament was contested by England, France, Ireland, Scotland, and Wales. The championship was won by Wales, their twentieth outright win in the competition. The Welsh had shared another nine titles with other teams. Having won all four of their games, Wales also won the Grand Slam for a record eighth time - Wales had formerly shared the record of seven with England. Victories over England, Ireland and Scotland (the Home Nations), also meant Wales won the Triple Crown for the third consecutive time, a record, given no other team had ever won the Triple Crown more than twice in a row. It was Wales' fifteenth in total, also a record, surpassing the fourteen won by England.

The tournament was the first Five Nations Championship in which two teams each with three victories faced off against each other in the final round of matches, with both capable of completing a Grand Slam with a victory.

== Participants ==
The teams involved were:

Nation	Venue	City	Head coach	Captain
England	Twickenham	London	Peter Colston	Bill Beaumont
France	Parc des Princes	Paris	Jean Desclaux	Jean-Pierre Bastiat
Ireland	Lansdowne Road	Dublin	Noel Murphy	John Moloney
Scotland	Murrayfield	Edinburgh	Nairn McEwan	Dougie Morgan
Wales	National Stadium	Cardiff	John Dawes	Phil Bennett

== Table ==
Pos	Team	Pld	W	D	L	PF	PA	PD	Pts
1	Wales	4	4	0	0	67	43	+24	8
2	France	4	3	0	1	51	47	+4	6
3	England	4	2	0	2	42	33	+9	4
4	Ireland	4	1	0	3	46	54	−8	2
5	Scotland	4	0	0	4	39	68	−29	0

== Results ==
1978-01-21

France	15–6	England
Tries: Averous; Gallion; Con.: Aguirre (2); Pen.: Aguirre		Drops: Old (2)

Parc des Princes, Paris
Attendance: 43,643
Referee: N. Sanson (Scotland)

1978-01-21

Ireland	12–9	Scotland
Tries: McKinney; Con.: Ward; Pen.: Ward (2)		Pen.: Morgan (3)

Lansdowne Road, Dublin
Referee: P. E. Hughes (England)

1978-02-04

Scotland	16–19	France
Tries: Irvine; Shedden; Con.: Morgan; Pen.: Morgan; Drops: Morgan		Tries: Gallion; Haget; Con.: Aguirre; Pen.: Aguirre (3)

Murrayfield, Edinburgh
Attendance: 55,000
Referee: C. G. P. Thomas (Wales)

1978-02-04

England	6–9	Wales
Pen.: Hignell (2)		Pen.: Bennett (3)

Twickenham, London
Referee: N. Sanson (Scotland)

1978-02-18

Wales	22–14	Scotland
Tries: Edwards; Fenwick; Gravell; Quinnell; Pen.: Bennett; Drops: Bennett		Tries: Renwick; Tomes; Pen.: Morgan (2)

National Stadium, Cardiff
Referee: J. R. West (Ireland)

1978-02-18

France	10–9	Ireland
Tries: Gallion; Pen.: Aguirre (2)		Pen.: Ward (3)

Parc des Princes, Paris
Attendance: 43,639
Referee: C. G. P. Thomas (Wales)

1978-03-04

Scotland	0–15	England
		Tries: Nelmes; Squires; Con.: Young (2); Pen.: Dodge

Murrayfield, Edinburgh
Referee: J. R. West (Ireland)

1978-03-04

Ireland	16–20	Wales
Tries: Moloney; Pen.: Ward (3); Drops: Ward		Tries: Fenwick; Williams; Pen.: Fenwick (4)

Lansdowne Road, Dublin
Referee: G. Domercq (France)

1978-03-18

Wales	16–7	France
Tries: Bennett (2); Con.: Bennett; Drops: Edwards; Fenwick		Tries: Skrela; Drops: Vivies

National Stadium, Cardiff
Attendance: 60,000
Referee: A. Welsby (England)

1978-03-18

England	15–9	Ireland
Tries: Dixon; Slemen; Con.: Young (2); Pen.: Young		Pen.: Ward (2); Drops: Ward

Twickenham, London
Referee: F. Palmade (France)
