= 1977 Five Nations Championship =

Rugby union competition

- Date: 15 January - 19 March 1977
- Countries: England; Ireland; France; Scotland; Wales

Tournament statistics
- Champions: France (6th title)
- Grand Slam: France (2nd title)
- Triple Crown: Wales (14th title)
- Matches played: 10
- Tries scored: 25 (2.5 per match)
- Top point scorers: (Wales) Phil Bennett (24); (Ireland) Mike Gibson (24)
- Top try scorers: (Scotland) Bill Gammell (2); (Wales) J. P. R. Williams (2); (France) Dominique Harize (2)

The 1977 Five Nations Championship was the forty-eighth series of the rugby union Five Nations Championship. Including the previous incarnations as the Home Nations and Five Nations, this was the eighty-third series of the northern hemisphere rugby union championship. Ten matches were played between 15 January and 19 March.

France won the championship for the sixth time outright. Including shared titles this was France's tenth championship overall. France won the Grand Slam for the second time and did so with the same fifteen players in all four matches (a unique feat for a Grand Slam winner) and without conceding a try. England, in 1913, are the only other Grand Slam winners not to concede a try. France also registered the lowest points total, 58, of any Grand Slam winner in the four point-try era (1972–92). Wales won the Triple Crown for the second consecutive season and the fourteenth time overall, equalling England's record of Triple Crown wins. They were the first Triple Crown winners to finish as runners-up in the championship.

The third game of the tournament — France v. Wales in Paris — was the subject of the 1978 film Grand Slam; the ending had to be rewritten when Wales unexpectedly lost.

== Participants ==
The teams involved were:

Nation	Venue	City	Head coach	Captain
England	Twickenham	London	Peter Colston	Roger Uttley
France	Parc des Princes	Paris	Jean Desclaux	Jacques Fouroux
Ireland	Lansdowne Road	Dublin	Roly Meates	Tom Grace
Scotland	Murrayfield	Edinburgh	Bill Dickinson	Ian McGeechan
Wales	National Stadium	Cardiff	John Dawes	Phil Bennett

== Table ==
Pos	Team	Pld	W	D	L	PF	PA	PD	Pts
1	France	4	4	0	0	58	21	+37	8
2	Wales	4	3	0	1	66	43	+23	6
3	England	4	2	0	2	42	24	+18	4
4	Scotland	4	1	0	3	39	85	−46	2
5	Ireland	4	0	0	4	33	65	−32	0

== Results ==
1977-01-15

Wales	25–9	Ireland
Tries: Burgess; Davies; J. P. R. Williams; Con.: Bennett (2); Pen.: Bennett (2); Drops: Fenwick		Pen.: Gibson (3)

National Stadium, Cardiff
Referee: N. Sanson (Scotland)

1977-01-15

England	26–6	Scotland
Tries: Kent; Slemen; Uttley; Young; Con.: Hignell (2); Pen.: Hignell (2)		Pen.: Irvine (2)

Twickenham, London
Referee: M. Joseph (Wales)

1977-02-05

France	16–9	Wales
Tries: Harize; Skrela; Con.: Romeu; Pen.: Romeu (2)		Pen.: Fenwick (3)

Parc des Princes, Paris
Attendance: 43,666
Referee: Alan Hosie (Scotland)

1977-02-05

Ireland	0–4	England
		Tries: Cooper

Lansdowne Road, Dublin
Referee: F. Palmade (France)

1977-02-19

England	3–4	France
Pen.: Hignell		Tries: Sangalli

Twickenham, London
Attendance: 70,000
Referee: J. C. Kelleher (Wales)

1977-02-19

Scotland	21–18	Ireland
Tries: Gammell (2); Madsen; Pen.: Irvine (2); Drops: Morgan		Tries: Gibson; Con.: Gibson; Pen.: Gibson (2); Quinn; Drops: Quinn

Murrayfield, Edinburgh
Referee: M. Joseph (Wales)

1977-03-05

France	23–3	Scotland
Tries: Bertranne; Harize; Paco; Paparemborde; Con.: Romeu (2); Pen.: Romeu		Pen.: Irvine (3)

Parc des Princes, Paris
Attendance: 43,660
Referee: M. Joseph (Wales)

1977-03-05

Wales	14–9	England
Tries: Edwards; J. P. R. Williams; Pen.: Fenwick (2)		Pen.: Hignell (3)

National Stadium, Cardiff
Referee: D. I. H. Burnett (Ireland)

1977-03-19

Ireland	6–15	France
Pen.: Gibson; Quinn		Tries: Bastiat; Con.: Aguirre; Pen.: Aguirre (2); Romeu

Lansdowne Road, Dublin
Attendance: 50,000
Referee: Alan Hosie (Scotland)

1977-03-19

Scotland	9–18	Wales
Tries: Irvine; Con.: Irvine; Drops: McGeechan		Tries: Bennett; J.J. Williams; Con.: Bennett (2); Pen.: Bennett (2)

Murrayfield, Edinburgh
Referee: G. Domercq (France)
