= 1979 Five Nations Championship =

Rugby union competition

- Date: 20 January – 17 March 1979
- Countries: England; Ireland; France; Scotland; Wales

Tournament statistics
- Champions: Wales (21st title)
- Triple Crown: Wales (16th title)
- Matches played: 10
- Tries scored: 32 (3.2 per match)
- Top point scorer: (Wales) Steve Fenwick (38)
- Top try scorer: (Ireland) Colin Patterson (3) (Scotland) Andy Irvine (3)

The 1979 Five Nations Championship was the 50th season of the Five Nations Championship, a rugby union competition contested by the men's national teams of England, France, Ireland, Scotland and Wales. Including its previous incarnations as the Home Nations Championship, it was the 85th edition of the competition. Ten matches were played between 20 January and 17 March.

Wales were the champions for the second consecutive season, winning a record 21st outright title. They had also shared the championship on nine other occasions. In beating Scotland, Ireland and England they also won the Triple Crown for a record fourth successive season and extended their record number of Triple Crown wins to 16. This was the last time that Wales won back-to-back championships until 2013. After Wales' final match at Cardiff Arms Park, JPR Williams was carried off the pitch by Welsh fans.

== Participants ==
Nation	Venue	City	Head coach	Captain
England	Twickenham Stadium	London	Peter Colston	Roger Uttley
France	Parc des Princes	Paris	Jean Desclaux	Jean-Pierre Rives
Ireland	Lansdowne Road	Dublin	Noel Murphy	Fergus Slattery
Scotland	Murrayfield Stadium	Edinburgh	Nairn McEwan	Ian McGeechan
Wales	National Stadium	Cardiff	John Dawes	J. P. R. Williams

== Table ==
Pos	Team	Pld	W	D	L	PF	PA	PD	Pts
1	Wales	4	3	0	1	83	51	+32	6
2	France	4	2	1	1	50	46	+4	5
3	Ireland	4	1	2	1	53	51	+2	4
4	England	4	1	1	2	24	52	−28	3
5	Scotland	4	0	2	2	48	58	−10	2

== Results ==
20 January 1979

Ireland	9–9	France
Pen: Ward (3)		Try: Caussade; Con: Aguirre; Pen: Aguirre

Lansdowne Road, Dublin
Attendance: 51,000
Referee: R. C. Quittenton (England)

20 January 1979

Scotland	13–19	Wales
Try: Irvine; Pen: Irvine (3)		Try: Holmes; Rees; Con: Fenwick; Pen: Fenwick (3)

Murrayfield Stadium, Edinburgh
Referee: F. Palmade (France)

3 February 1979

Wales	24–21	Ireland
Try: Martin; Ringer; Con: Fenwick (2); Pen: Fenwick (4)		Try: McLennan; Patterson; Con: Ward (2); Pen: Ward (3)

National Stadium, Cardiff
Referee: Alan Hosie (Scotland)

3 February 1979

England	7–7	Scotland
Try: Slemen; Pen: Bennett		Try: Rutherford; Pen: Irvine

Twickenham Stadium, London
Referee: C. Norling (Wales)

17 February 1979

France	14–13	Wales
Try: Gourdon (2); Pen: Aguirre (2)		Try: Holmes; Pen: Fenwick (3)

Parc des Princes, Paris
Attendance: 45,259
Referee: D. I. H. Burnett (Ireland)

17 February 1979

Ireland	12–7	England
Try: McLennan; Con: Ward; Pen: Ward; Drop: Ward		Try: Bennett; Pen: Bennett

Lansdowne Road, Dublin
Referee: Alan Hosie (Scotland)

3 March 1979

England	7–6	France
Try: Bennett; Pen: Bennett		Try: Costes; Con: Aguirre

Twickenham Stadium, London
Attendance: 67,800
Referee: J. R. West (Ireland)

3 March 1979

Scotland	11–11	Ireland
Try: Irvine; Robertson; Pen: Irvine		Try: Patterson (2); Pen: Ward

Murrayfield Stadium, Edinburgh
Referee: C. Thomas (Wales)

17 March 1979

France	21–17	Scotland
Try: Bélascain; Malquier (2); Pen: Aguerre; Aguirre; Drop: Aguerre		Try: Dickson; Irvine; Robertson; Con: Irvine; Pen: Irvine

Parc des Princes, Paris
Attendance: 45,000
Referee: R. C. Quittenton (England)

17 March 1979

Wales	27–3	England
Try: Rees; Richards; Ringer; Roberts; Williams; Con: Fenwick; Martin; Drop: G. Davies		Pen: Bennett

National Stadium, Cardiff
Referee: J. P. Bonnet (France)
