= Yves Lafarge =

France international rugby union player

- Born: 16 January 1953 (age 73) Chaville, France
- Height: 5 ft 9 in (175 cm)
- Weight: 160 lb (73 kg)

Rugby union career
- Position: Scrum-half
International career
Years	Team	Apps	(Points)
1978–81	France	3	(0)

Yves Lafarge (born 16 January 1953) is a French former international rugby union player.

Born in Chaville, Lafarge was a scrum-half and gained three France caps in sporadic appearances between 1978 and 1981. He debuted in a win over Romania in Bucharest, then was a member of the French squad for their 1979 tour of New Zealand, where he was preferred over Jérôme Gallion against the All Blacks at Carisbrook. His final appearance came during France's grand slam–winning 1981 Five Nations campaign, substituting injured centre Patrick Mesny against Ireland at Lansdowne Road.

Lafarge played at club level for AS Montferrand while representing France.

== See also ==
- List of France national rugby union players
