= Ian Burns =

Ian Burns may refer to:

- Ian Burns (snooker player) (born 1985), English professional snooker player
- Ian Burns (footballer) (1939–2015), Scottish professional footballer
- Ian Burns (rugby union) (1955–2010), Irish businessman and rugby union player
