= Adrien Mournet =

French rugby union player

- Born: 5 July 1953 (age 73) Galan, France
- Height: 5 ft 9 in (175 cm)
- Weight: 150 lb (68 kg)

Rugby union career
- Position: Scrum-half
International career
Years	Team	Apps	(Points)
1981	France	1	(0)

Adrien Mournet (born 5 July 1953) is a French former international rugby union player.

Born in Galan, Mournet was a two–time Brennus Shield finalist playing for Stade Bagnérais.

Mournet made several representative appearances for France "B", forming a halfback partnership with Pierre Pédeutour. He was a member of the French squad for the 1980 Five Nations, without obtaining a cap. In 1981, Mournet was flown over to Australia as a replacement player for Pierre Berbizier, who suffered a badly cut ear in the opening Test match against the Wallabies. During the second Test match at the SCG, France's scrum–half Jean-Pierre Élissalde came off the field injured, giving Mournet the opportunity to play the remaining 20 minutes and earn an international cap.

== See also ==
- List of France national rugby union players
