= Yves Duhard =

French rugby union player

- Born: 11 July 1955 (age 71) Bagnères-de-Bigorre, France
- Height: 6 ft 5 in (196 cm)
- Weight: 237 lb (108 kg)

Rugby union career
- Position: Lock
International career
Years	Team	Apps	(Points)
1980	France	1	(0)

Yves Duhard (born 11 July 1955) is a French former international rugby union player.

A lock from Bagnères-de-Bigorre, Duhard began playing rugby union at the age of seven and spent his entire career with Stade Bagnérais, featuring in two French Championship finals with his hometown club.

Duhard was capped once by France, against England at the Parc des Princes during the 1980 Five Nations, debuting alongside Manuel Carpentier and Serge Gabernet. England won by four points and Duhard was dropped from the team, at least in part as punishment for a kicking incident during the match.

== See also ==
- List of France national rugby union players
