= Gareth Edwards (rugby union) =

British Lions & Wales international rugby union player

Sir Gareth Edwards CBE
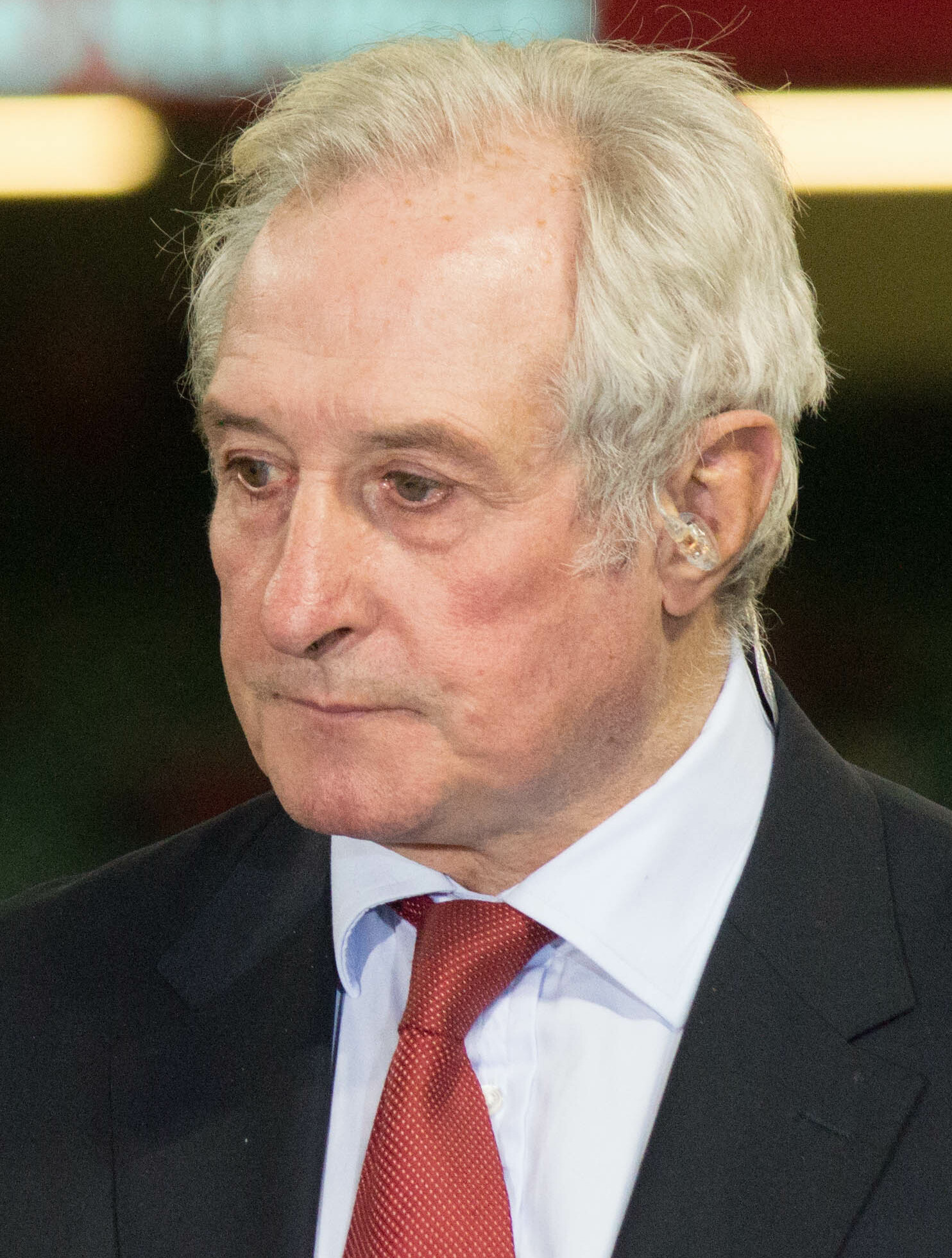
- Edwards in 2014
- Born: Gareth Owen Edwards; 12 July 1947 (age 79) Gwaun-Cae-Gurwen, Glamorgan, Wales
- School: Millfield
- University: Cardiff College of Education

Rugby union career
- Position: Scrum-half
Amateur team(s)
Years	Team	Apps	(Points)
- Cwmgors RFC
Senior career
Years	Team	Apps	(Points)
1966–1978	Cardiff RFC	195	(426)
International career
Years	Team	Apps	(Points)
1967–1978	Wales	53	(88)
1968, 1971 & 1974	British Lions	10	(3)

Sir Gareth Owen Edwards CBE (born 12 July 1947) is a Welsh former rugby union player who played at scrum-half for Cardiff RFC, Wales and the British Lions. Edwards was noted for his athleticism, skill, game-intelligence, and poise and has been widely acclaimed as the greatest rugby player of all time.

Edwards was also a remarkably durable player, not missing a test match for Wales from his debut in 1967 until his final game on 18 March 1978 when his man of the match performance helped secure the victory over France in the 1978 Five Nations Championship, win a record eighth Grand Slam for Wales and the first ever "Triple Triple Crown" in the competitions history.

Edwards has been named as the greatest player of all time in a 2003 poll of international rugby players, topped a list of the '50 Greatest Rugby players' by former England captain Will Carling in The Daily Telegraph, and was named as the greatest player ever by British and Irish Lions coach Ian McGeechan.

== Early life ==
Born a miner's son in Gwaun-Cae-Gurwen, Glamorgan, Wales. Edwards went from Gwaun Cae Gurwen Primary School to Pontardawe Technical School for Boys (now Cwmtawe Community School), where he was taken under the wing of sports teacher Bill Samuels.

The young Edwards would represent his local rugby club, Cwmgors RFC but excelled in a wide range of sports, most notably in gymnastics and athletics. Edwards played for Gwaun-Cae-Gurwen's soccer club, Colbren Rovers, topping the clubs scoring charts (including scoring seven goals in one match) and being selected to represent West Wales Youth. Edwards was originally signed on a professional contract by Swansea Town A.F.C. at the age of 16, but would instead opt to take up a sports scholarship to the elite Millfield Public School in Somerset, England. Edwards did eventually get to wear a Swansea shirt, following his retirement from rugby in 1978 when he was again signed to the club by then manager John Toshack, this time as a reserve, and he regularly turned out in reserve matches and testimonials.

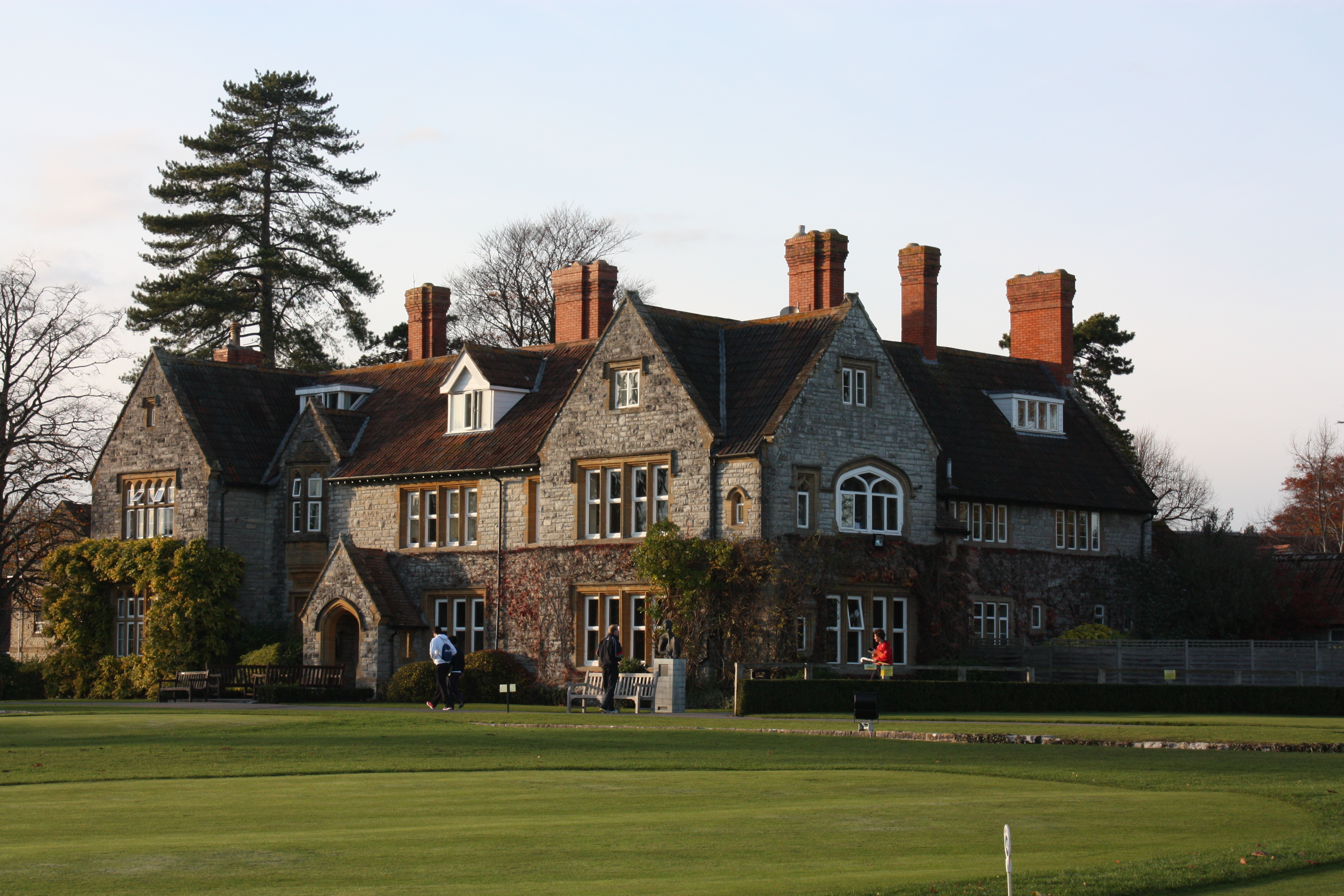
Edwards' won a scholarship to the prestigious Millfield Public School in Somerset, England due to his early sporting prowess.

At Millfield, Edwards continued to excel in a number of sports, setting a new British junior record for the 220 yards hurdles in winning the 1966 English Schools title. Edwards would also represented English schools at the UK schools international in Belfast that year where he finished second in the hurdles event. While on the podium Edwards' lifelong friend and future Wales and Lions teammate J. J. Williams (who was competing for Welsh schools in the 100m sprint) walked past and jokingly muttered "traitor".

== Playing career ==
=== Wales ===
Edwards won his first international cap for Wales on 1 April 1967 at the age of 19 against France in Paris in the 1967 Five Nations Championship. Within a year, Edwards made history when he became Wales's youngest ever captain at just 20 in the 1968 Five Nations Championship victory against Scotland. Following the 1969 Wales tour of Oceania, Edwards was named Welsh Player of the Year and was approached by the professional Rugby League team, St Helens R.F.C. However, Edwards declined the offer in order to continue as an amateur for Cardiff and Wales.

From his debut until his retirement in 1978, Edwards scored twenty tries for Wales across a record 53 appearances, captaining his country on 13 occasions and winning another ten international caps for the British Lions. Edwards won all of his caps in succession, never being dropped from the teams or sustaining any injury that would allow another player to start in his place. Edwards also played his entire Wales and Lions career with two of the best outside halves the game has ever seen: Barry John and Phil Bennett. In the early part of his career, Edwards and his Cardiff teammate Barry John appeared inseparable, always knowing what the other was doing.

During Edwards' eleven seasons in international rugby, Wales dominated the Five Nations Championship, winning the title seven times. Edwards also is one of seven Welsh players to have won three Grand Slams. The other players are his contemporaries, Gerald Davies and JPR Williams with Ryan Jones, Adam Jones, Gethin Jenkins and Alun Wyn Jones achieving the same in the professional era. Edwards' long and successful international career finally came to an end on 18 March 1978, against France in the 1978 Five Nations Championship. Unlike on his debut however, Edwards and Wales celebrated a 16–7 win against the French in front of a home crowd at the Arms Park in Cardiff. The victory meant that Wales sealed a record eighth Grand Slam and a first ever "Triple Triple Crown" – being the first team ever to win the Triple Crown three times in a row. Edwards was also named the Rothmans Player of the Year for 1978.

=== British and Irish Lions ===
Edwards played 39 times for the British & Irish Lions, including 10 consecutive test matches during which he scored sixteen tries and one drop goal. He was first selected for the 1968 tour to South Africa, just a year on from his Welsh debut. Edwards was again selected for the famous 1971 Lions where he played every test match in an historic series win, the first for a touring British Lions side in New Zealand. Edwards would again tour and play ever test match in the unbeaten 1974 Lions in South Africa.

=== Cardiff RFC ===
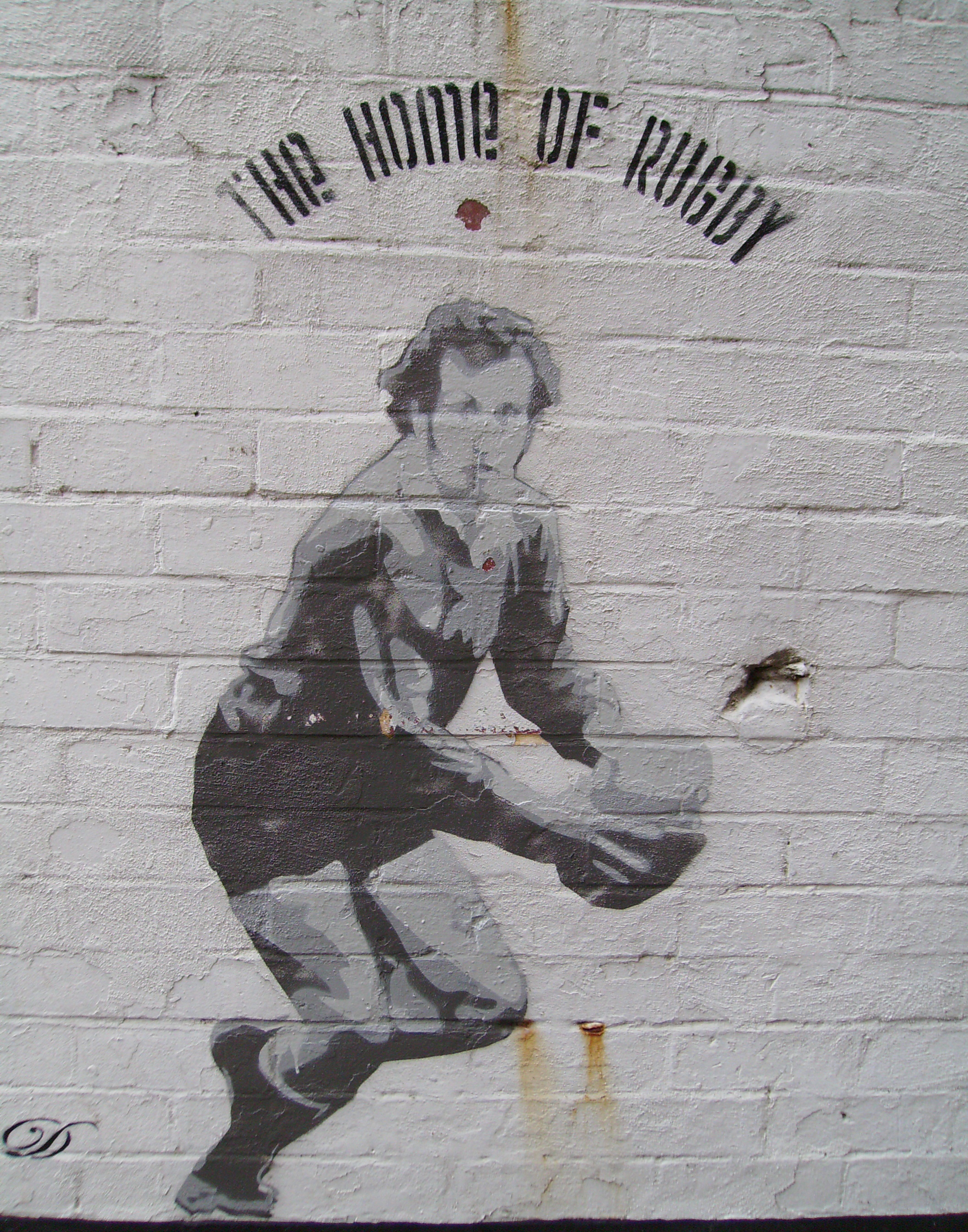
Image of Edwards on a wall at Cardiff Arms Park, 2007

He made his debut for Cardiff RFC against Coventry on 17 September 1966 and he played 12 seasons for Cardiff, scoring 69 tries in 195 games.

=== Other ===
Edwards also featured for Cwmgors RFC Wales Secondary Schools, Cardiff Institute, Cardiff College, Welsh Academicals, East Wales, Barbarian F.C., Wolfhounds, Irish President XV, World XV in South Africa in 1977, the combined England and Wales against Scotland and Ireland at the RFU centenary in 1971, first Wales Sevens team SRU centenary in 1973, and the RAF (though not in the Services) on tour in Cyprus 1972.

== That Try ==
Edwards' try for the Barbarians against the All Blacks in 1973 at Cardiff Arms Park, often referred to simply as "that try", is regarded by many as the greatest try ever scored. The move starts when a long kick from the New Zealand winger Bryan Williams was caught by Phil Bennett near to his goal line. Bennett sidestepped three times, evading three tackles, before passing the ball on to JPR Williams. The ball then passed through four pairs of hands (John Pullin, John Dawes, Tommy David and Derek Quinnell) before the on-rushing Edwards, slipping between two teammates and seemingly intercepting the last pass, finished the move with a diving try in the left-hand corner.

In a UK poll conducted by Channel 4 in 2002 British rugby supporters voted Edwards's historic try for the Barbarians No. 20 in the list of the 100 Greatest Sporting Moments. There have been multiple debates about whether the try would have stood today, factoring in the deep scrutiny of the TMO (Television Match Official)

== Post-playing career ==
During the COVID-19 pandemic, Edwards appeared in a government video message with the First Minister of Wales, Mark Drakeford encouraging people to get vaccinated

When Edwards wrote his autobiography he was branded a "professional" and was temporarily prevented from coaching or being involved in any way with the sport of rugby union.

From 1978 until 1982 Edwards was a team captain on the TV quiz show A Question of Sport along with Liverpool and England footballer Emlyn Hughes.

Edwards has also commentated on the game for both BBC and in the Welsh language for S4C. He is one of several players to have appeared in the S4C series Rygbi a Mwy. He is also a director at the Cardiff Rugby region, director of Mercedes dealership Euro Commercials Ltd. and President of Cardiff Institute for the Blind. A sculpture of Gareth Edwards stands in the St David's, Cardiff.

In 1990 he set a British angling record when he landed a pike weighing 45 lb 6oz at Llandegfedd Reservoir near Pontypool. Edwards held the record for two years. He also enjoys shooting game-birds.

In 1991, Edwards appeared as a fictionalised version of himself in the film Old Scores. Edwards was named as a patron of The Richard Hunt Foundation and in 2010 he was named a Patron of the Jaguar Academy of Sport.

In August 2014, Edwards was one of 200 public figures who were signatories to a letter to The Guardian opposing Scottish independence in the run-up to September's referendum on that issue.

In 2019 he appeared, alongside wife Maureen, in the BBC Series Gareth Edwards’s Great Welsh Adventure. The programme returned for a second series in 2021.

== Accolades and honours ==
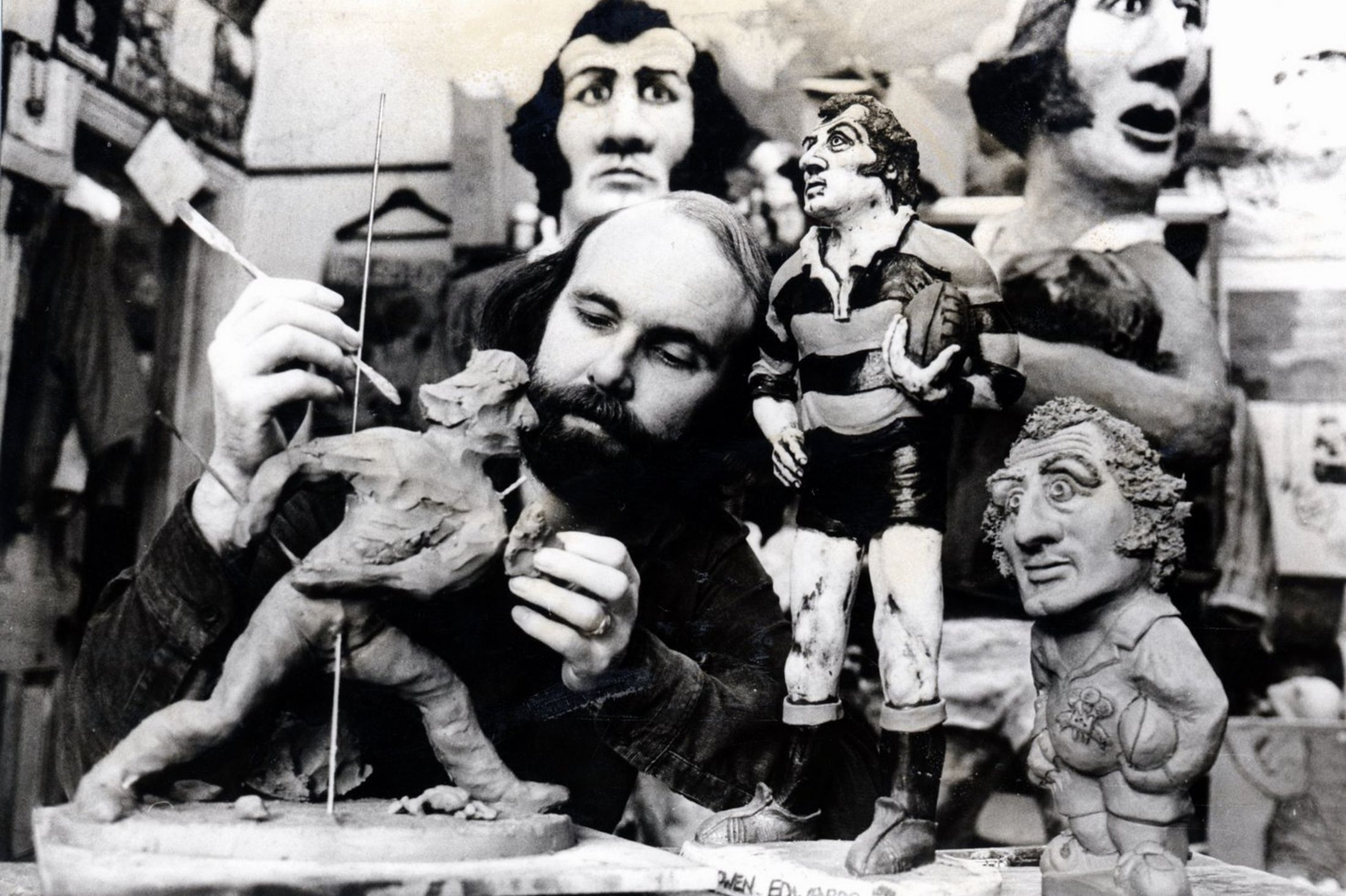
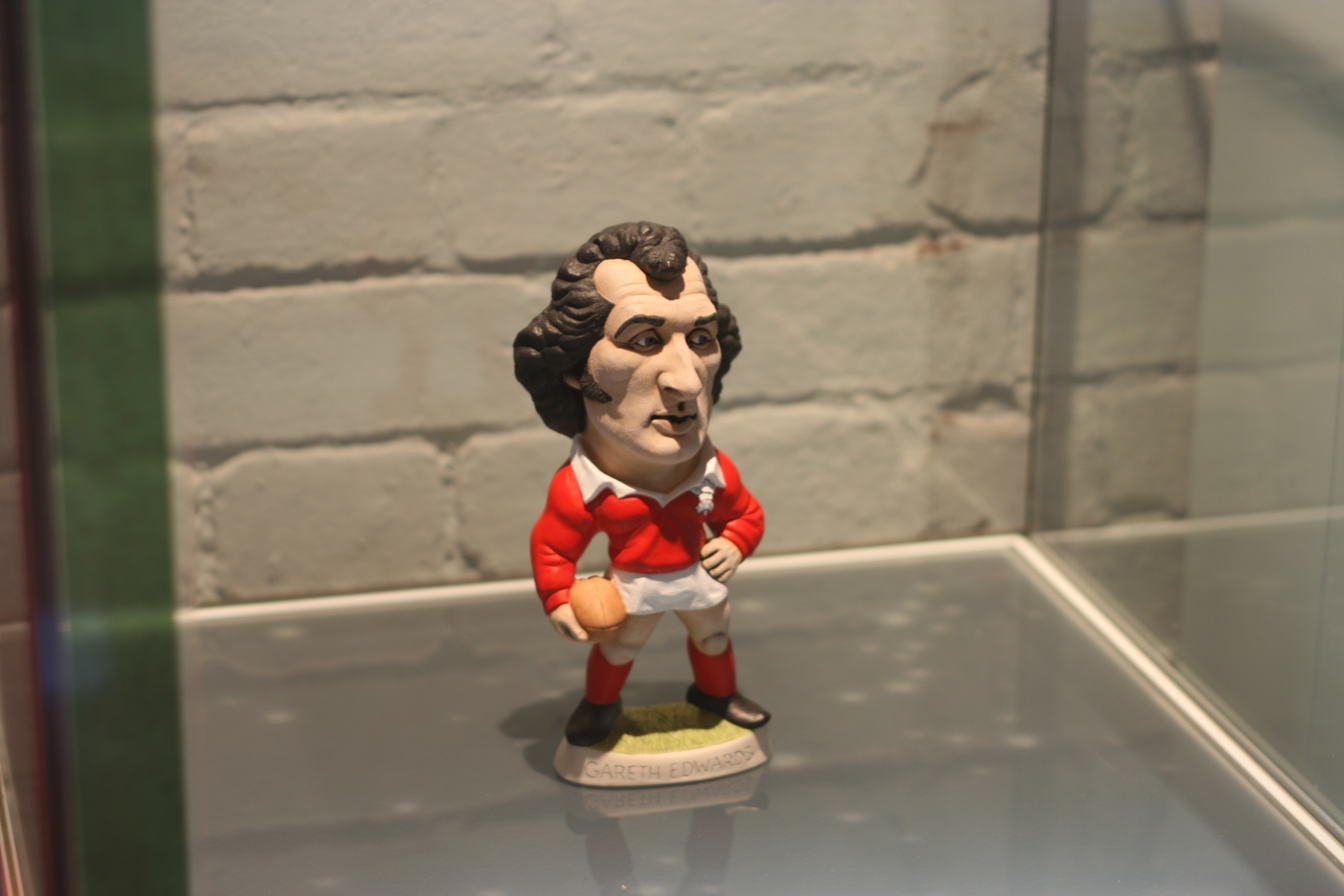
Artist John Hughes working on a new Gareth Edwards Grogg in the 1970s, A completed Grogg of Edwards on display at the National Waterfront Museum in Swansea

In 1969 artist John Hughes created his first ever Grogg of the young Wales captain, Gareth Edwards. Groggs would go on to become a part of Welsh rugby culture and the artist and his son, Richard would create more varieties of Edwards than any other player. Edwards was first named Welsh Rugby Player of The Year later in 1969 and the BBC Cymru Wales Sports Personality of the Year in 1974. He was the subject of This Is Your Life in 1976 when he was surprised by Eamonn Andrews.

Edwards was appointed a Member of the Order of the British Empire (MBE) in the 1975 Birthday Honours for services to Welsh rugby football; he was promoted to Commander (CBE) in the 2007 New Year Honours, "for services to sport, particularly rugby." He was knighted in the 2015 Birthday Honours, for services to sport and for charitable services.

"He was and always will be the master. Out of this world. The Greatest."

— Scotland and British and Irish Lions player and coach, Ian McGeechan on Edwards.

Edwards has often been cited as the greatest player in the history of Rugby Union. In 1997, Edwards was one of the first fifteen former players inducted into the International Rugby Hall of Fame along with fellow Welshmen, Barry John and JPR Williams. He is also the subject of a plaque in the Rugby Pathway of Fame in the town of Rugby, Warwickshire, which is credited as the home of the game. After being voted as the "Greatest Welsh Player of all time" at an event in November 2001, Edwards was declared the greatest player of all time by a poll of international rugby players conducted in 2003 by Rugby World magazine. However, Edwards modesty stated that the New Zealand scrum-half Sid Going was "the best I played against and, yes, he probably had the edge on me in the games we played".

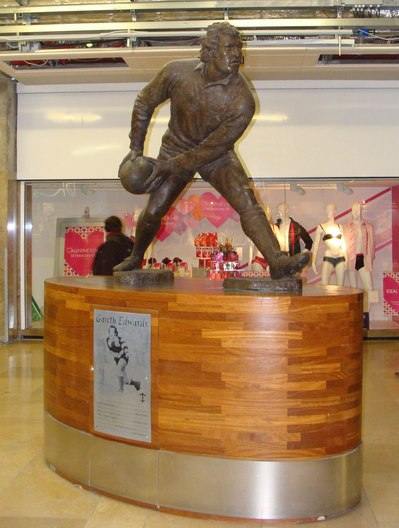
The sculpture of Gareth Edwards in St David's, Cardiff and Unit 800009 named in his honour by Great Western Railway.

In 2007, the former England captain Will Carling published his list of the '50 Greatest Rugby players' in The Daily Telegraph, and also ranked Edwards as the greatest player ever. Carling added that "He was a supreme athlete with supreme skills, the complete package. He played in the 1970s, but, if he played now, he would still be the best. He was outstanding at running, passing, kicking and reading the game. He sits astride the whole of rugby as the ultimate athlete on the pitch."

In 2017 the BBC broadcast Sir Gareth Edwards at 70 which included tributes from Max Boyce, David Duckham, Huw Llywelyn Davies, John Taylor, Phil Bennett, Rob Brydon, Siân Phillips and Bryn Terfel.

== See also ==
- Welsh Rugby Union
