= Alastair Biggar =

Scotland international rugby union player

Alastair Gourlay Biggar
- Born: 4 August 1946 Edinburgh, Scotland
- Died: 6 February 2016 (aged 69) Cerne Abbas, England
- School: Sedbergh School
- University: Shuttleworth College

Rugby union career
- Position: Wing / Centre
Amateur team(s)
Years	Team	Apps	(Points)
1966-76	London Scottish		
Provincial / State sides
Years	Team	Apps	(Points)
- Middlesex
- East Midlands
- Sussex
1966	South Eastern Counties	1	
1969	Combined Scottish Districts	1	(6)
International career
Years	Team	Apps	(Points)
1969-72	Scotland	12	
1971	British and Irish Lions		
1968-70	Barbarians	7	(9)

Alastair Gourlay Biggar (4 August 1946 – 6 February 2016) was a Scotland international rugby union player.

== Rugby Union career ==
=== Amateur career ===
He went to Sedbergh School and played rugby for their school side.

He played for London Scottish. He joined the club in 1966.

He was inducted into the London Scottish Hall of Fame in 2009.

=== Provincial career ===
He played for Middlesex, East Midlands and Sussex. He played for South Eastern Counties in 1966 against Australia, with the London Counties side winning 14-9.

He played for the Combined Scottish Districts on 26 November 1969 against the Combined Services side. The Scottish Districts won the match 31-12, with Biggar scoring two tries.

=== International career ===
Playing for Scotland Schools he was part of the Scotland side that beat England 57-0 in 1965.

He was capped twelve times for his country, between 1969 and 1972, including the Five Nations seasons of 1970, 1971 and 1972. His debut was Scotland's 6-3 win over South Africa.

In the 1972 game against Wales, he sustained a hamstring injury. He played England three times, winning every match.

He toured New Zealand in 1971 with the British and Irish Lions. He played 10 games on the tour scoring nine tries, but was not picked to play a test match.

He played 7 matches for the Barbarians and scored 9 points, between 1968 and 1970.

== Business career ==
His father ran the family feed mill in Dalbeattie. On moving to London, Biggar became a foreign exchange broker.

== Family ==
Fellow London Scottish and Scotland player Mike Biggar was his cousin, the Scotland flanker Douglas Elliot was his uncle. He was married twice, with 2 children from the first marriage and one from the second marriage.

== Death ==
He died on 6 February 2016 from cancer.
