= Richard Cardus =

English rugby union player

- Full name: Richard Michael Cardus
- Born: 23 May 1956 (age 70) Leeds, Yorkshire, England
- Height: 6 ft 2 in (188 cm)
- School: Foxwood School, Leeds

Rugby union career
- Position: Centre
International career
Years	Team	Apps	(Points)
1979	England	2	(0)

Richard Michael Cardus (born 23 May 1956) is an English former rugby union international.

A native of Leeds, Cardus was a centre and played for his local side Roundhay, from where he received his England call up. He was capped twice in the 1979 Five Nations, against France at Twickenham and Wales at Cardiff.

Cardus captained Wasps RFC to the club's inaugural John Player Cup final in 1985–86. During his time with the Wasps, he was a London Division representative player, appearing against touring sides such as the All Blacks.

Moving to Wales through his work, Cardus continued his rugby career with Cardiff RFC.

== See also ==
- List of England national rugby union players
