= Michel Clémente =

France international rugby union player

- Born: 3 November 1955 (age 71) Oloron-Sainte-Marie, France
- Height: 6 ft 1 in (185 cm)
- Weight: 213 lb (97 kg)

Rugby union career
- Position: No. 8
International career
Years	Team	Apps	(Points)
1978–80	France	3	(0)

Michel Clémente (born 3 November 1955) is a French former international rugby union player.

Clémente hailed from Oloron-Sainte-Marie and played for hometown club FC Oloron.

A number eight, Clémente was capped three times for France, debuting against Romania in Bucharest in 1978. His other appearances came in the 1980 Five Nations, for France's final two fixtures, against Scotland and Ireland.

== See also ==
- List of France national rugby union players
