= J. J. Williams (rugby union) =

British Lions & Wales international rugby union footballer (1948–2020)

J. J. Williams MBE
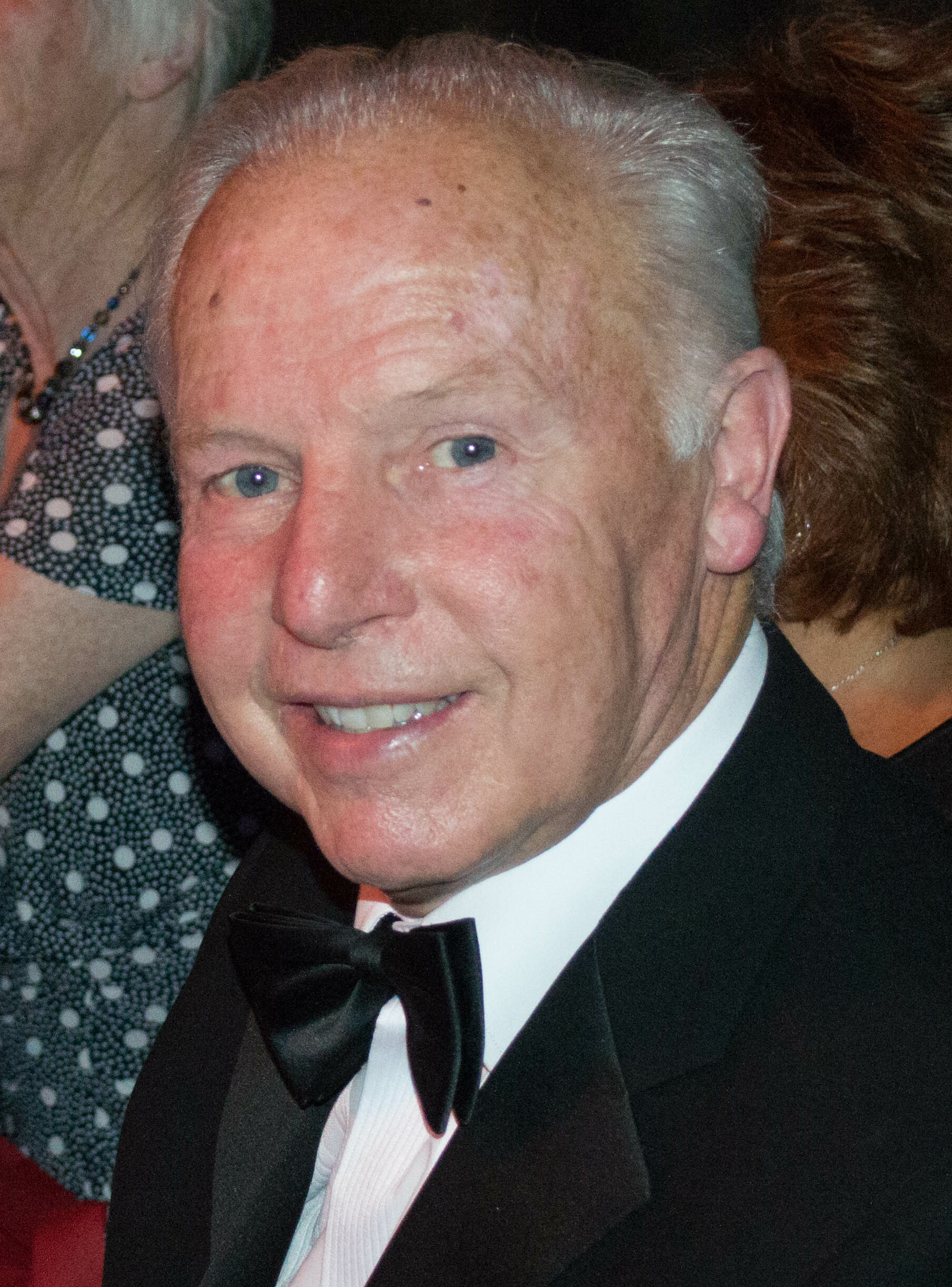
- Born: John James Williams; 1 April 1948 Nantyffyllon, Maesteg, Wales
- Died: 29 October 2020 (aged 72)
- School: Maesteg Grammar School
- University: Cardiff College of Education
- Notable relative: Rhys Williams (son)

Rugby union career
- Position: Winger
Senior career
Years	Team	Apps	(Points)
1966	Nantyffyllon RFC	12	(16+)
1966-1972	Bridgend	100	(396)
1972–1980	Llanelli	227	(652)
–	Barbarians	10	(68)
International career
Years	Team	Apps	(Points)
1973–79	Wales	30	(48)
1974–77	British Lions	7	(20)
- Correct as of 29 April 2019

John James Williams MBE (1 April 1948 – 29 October 2020), known universally as J. J. Williams, was a rugby union player who gained thirty caps for Wales as a winger. In his early career, Williams was a talented sprinter, later becoming a member of the Wales rugby team that won the Five Nations Championship in 1975, 1976, 1978 and 1979, including Grand Slam wins in 1976 and 1978.

Williams played at outside half for Nantyffyllon RFC in 1966 breaking the club scoring record with four tries against Llanharan; then Bridgend RFC as a winger in the late 1960s and early 1970s and Llanelli RFC from 1972. His time at Llanelli included a famous win against the New Zealand All Blacks in 1972. He was a key try creator and scorer for the 1974 British Lions tour to South Africa. After his retirement in 1980, Williams became a pundit and commentator for BBC Cymru Wales and later a successful businessman. His son, Rhys, is a professional track and field athlete.

== Career ==
Williams was born in the south Wales coal mining village of Nantyffyllon one mile north of the town of Maesteg in Cwm Llynfi - the Llynfi Valley - in the county of Glamorgan. He received his initial education at Nantyffyllon Primary and Junior School where he was introduced to rugby by his teacher Eifion Williams. Under the latter’s guidance Nantyffyllon reached the final of the Schools’ Valleys Cup. His secondary education was at Maesteg Grammar School. Under the guidance of his rugby master David Brown, in the sixth form he won a Welsh Secondary Schools’ cap at outside half. He later moved on to and graduated from Cardiff College of Education, which was described as "a hotbed of sporting excellence". Williams was a talented track athlete, representing Wales in the Commonwealth Games in Edinburgh in 1970. He achieved a time of 10.6 seconds in the 100 metre heat and also competed in the 200 metres and 4 × 100 metres relay. He became Welsh sprint champion in 1971.

Williams initially played senior rugby while still at school for his home village of Nantyffyllon; then Bridgend before joining Llanelli RFC, for whom he played a total of 227 games in nine seasons and scored 164 tries. In his distinguished rugby career he also played for the Barbarians, Natal, Irish Wolfhounds and Glamorgan.

He gained his first international cap in 1973 in a defeat against France in Paris. He was rated as one of the fastest wingers in the game, and scored 12 tries in 30 appearances for Wales. He went on two British and Irish Lions tours, playing in all four tests in South Africa in 1974 and in three tests in New Zealand in 1977. He played a major role in the 1974 'invincible' series against South Africa, scoring two tries in each of the second and third tests (in so doing becoming the first British and Irish Lion to score two tries in the same test match in the 20th Century), and earning the title "The Welsh Whippet", and a last-gasp try against Orange Free State to help preserve the Lions' unbeaten record.

Towards the end of his rugby playing career, in 1980 Williams participated in the hugely popular BBC TV Superstars competition. Reaching the final, he competed alongside an array of sports stars including 400-metre runner John Sherwood; football World Cup winner Geoff Hurst; top basketball player Steve Assinder; champion boxer Alan Minter; modern pentathlete Danny Nightingale; Olympic gold medalist Daley Thompson and judo legend Brian Jacks.

== Post-retirement ==
Williams later ran a commercial and industrial painting company based in Pyle, near Bridgend. He also fronted a consortium which offered to take over the Millennium Stadium in Cardiff. All three of his children have represented Wales at track and field events. His son Rhys was the Welsh track record holder in the 400 metres hurdles (49.09) in 2005. In 2013 he helped to promote the Wales Abdominal Aortic Aneurysm Screening Programme

He died on 29 October 2020 at the age of 72 from cancer. He is survived by his wife and three children.

== Honours ==
=== Personal honours ===
- Appointed Member of the Order of the British Empire (MBE) in the 2013 New Year Honours "for services to Rugby and charitable services in Wales."
- Inducted into the Welsh Sports Hall of Fame in 2009

=== Team honours ===
Llanelli

- WRU Challenge Cup
  - Winner (4): 1973, 1974, 1975, 1976
- Snelling Sevens
  - Winner (2): 1973, 1979

Wales

- Five Nations Championship
  - Winner (4): 1975, 1976, 1978, 1979
- Grand Slam
  - Winner (2): 1976, 1978,
- Triple Crown
  - Winner (4): 1976, 1977, 1978, 1979

British and Irish Lions

- British and Irish Lions Series: 1974, 1977
