= Ian Burns (rugby union) =

Irish rugby union player

- Full name: Ian George Burns
- Born: 7 December 1955 Dublin, Ireland
- Died: 30 July 2014 (aged 58) Connemara, Ireland

Rugby union career
- Position: Fly-half
International career
Years	Team	Apps	(Points)
1980	Ireland	1	(0)

Ian George Burns (7 December 1955 – 18 January 2010) was an Irish businessman and rugby union international.

Burns was born in Dublin and educated at The High School, Dublin. The fly-half in the school side, he formed a half-back partnership with John Robbie (a future Ireland player) that was instrumental to them winning the Leinster Schools Senior Cup for the first time in 1973. He captained Dublin club Wanderers and played for Leinster in provincial rugby.

In the 1980 Five Nations Championship, Burns earned his only Ireland cap against England at Twickenham, coming on as a substitute for injured centre Paul McNaughton during the first half. England won the match 24–9.

As a cricketer, Burns played 26 seasons with the YMCA Cricket Club and featured in seven Leinster Senior Cup titles.

Burns founded REDjet, a short-lived low-cost airline based in the Caribbean.

== See also ==
- List of Ireland national rugby union players
