= Ronnie Elliott (rugby union) =

Rugby union player from Northern Ireland

- Full name: William Ronald Joseph Elliott
- Born: 20 November 1952 (age 73) Donaghadee, Northern Ireland

Rugby union career
- Position: Fullback
International career
Years	Team	Apps	(Points)
1979	Ireland	1	(0)

William Ronald Joseph Elliott (born 20 November 1952) is a former sportsperson from Northern Ireland who represented Ulster in both cricket and rugby union. He was capped once for Ireland as a rugby union player.

Born in Donaghadee, Elliott was educated at Regent House School.

Elliott, a school teacher by profession, gained a rugby cap for Ireland against Scotland at Murrayfield in the 1979 Five Nations, playing as a fullback. He was club captain of Bangor RFC and also led the Donaghadee Cricket Club.

== See also ==
- List of Ireland national rugby union players
