= Tostat =

- Commune
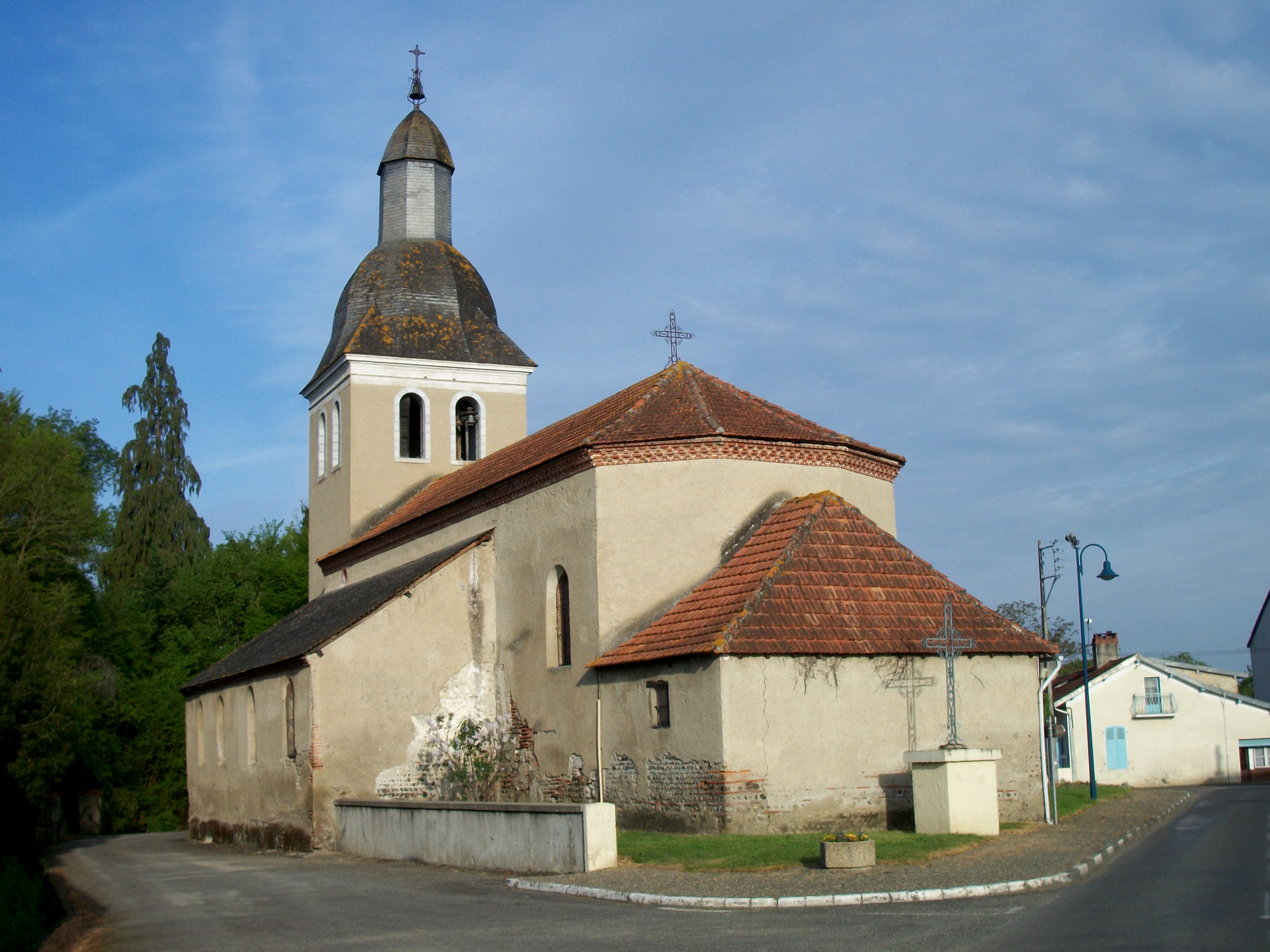
- The church of Saint-Martin

- Coat of arms
- Location of Tostat
- Location within France Location within Occitanie
- Coordinates: 43°19′53″N 0°06′14″E
- Country: France
- Region: Occitania
- Department: Hautes-Pyrénées
- Arrondissement: Tarbes
- Canton: Val d'Adour-Rustan-Madiranais
- Intercommunality: Adour Madiran

Government
  - Mayor (2020–2026): Bruno Mora
- Area^{1}: 6.27 km^{2} (2.42 sq mi)
- Elevation: 252 m (827 ft)
- Highest elevation: 254 m (833 ft)
- Lowest elevation: 234 m (768 ft)
- Population (2023): 550
  - Density: 88/km^{2} (230/sq mi)
- Time zone: UTC+01:00 (CET)
  - Summer (DST): UTC+02:00 (CEST)
- INSEE/Postal code: 65446 /65140
- ^{1} French Land Register data, which excludes lakes, ponds, glaciers > 1 km^{2} (0.386 sq mi or 247 acres) and river estuaries.

Tostat (French pronunciation: [tɔsta]; Occitan: Tostac) is a commune in the Hautes-Pyrénées department in south-western France.

== See also ==
- Communes of the Hautes-Pyrénées department
