= Yves Malquier =

French rugby union player (born 1956)

- Born: 7 May 1956 (age 70) Sigean, France
- Height: 6 ft 3 in (191 cm)
- Weight: 218 lb (99 kg)

Rugby union career
- Position: No. 8
International career
Years	Team	Apps	(Points)
1979	France	1	(8)

Yves Malquier (born 7 May 1956) is a French former rugby union international.

Born in Sigean, Malquier played for RC Narbonne and was a member of the side's 1978–79 Brennus Shield win.

Malquier gained a France cap in the 1979 Five Nations Championship as a number eight against Scotland at the Parc des Princes, selected along with new cap Jean-François Marchal to add extra bulk to the pack. He scored two tries in a 21–17 France win and was subsequently picked for that year's tour of Fiji and New Zealand, but wasn't capped further after injuring himself in one of the tour matches.

== See also ==
- List of France national rugby union players
