= John Carleton (rugby union) =

England international rugby union player

John Carleton (born 24 November 1955) is a former England international rugby union player. He played as a wing.

He started playing rugby at Upholland Grammar School (now Winstanley College) and moved rapidly from 2nd XV to 1st XV where he was a prolific try scorer in school games. He lived in Orrell and was encouraged by many of his schoolmates to join the local club Orrell RUFC, locally and nationally known at the time for its successes against bigger opposition. He left school in 1974 after which he continued to play for Orrell R.U.F.C.

He had 26 caps for England, from 1979 to 1984, scoring 7 tries, 28 points on aggregate. He had 20 caps at the Five Nations Championship, from 1980 to 1984, where he scored all the tries of his international career. He was part of the team that won the 1980 Five Nations Championship, with a Grand Slam.

He toured twice with the British and Irish Lions, to South Africa in 1980 and New Zealand in 1983, winning 3 caps on each tour.
