= Nick Preston (rugby union) =

English international rugby union player (born 1958)

- Full name: Nicholas John Preston
- Born: 5 April 1958 (age 68) Prestwich, Lancashire

Rugby union career
- Position: Centre
International career
Years	Team	Apps	(Points)
1979–1980	England	3	(4)

Nicholas John Preston (born 5 April 1958) is a British former rugby union international who represented the England in three Test matches.

Preston was born in Prestwich and educated at Lancaster Royal Grammar School and the University of Nottingham.

Preston, a Lancashire-born centre, made his Test debut against the All Blacks at Twickenham in 1979. His other two Test appearances came during England's successful 1980 Five Nations Championship campaign, in which they achieved their first Grand Slam since 1957. This included the team's win over France at Parc des Princes, where he scored one of England's two tries. At club level he competed for Richmond F.C. in London.

== See also ==
- List of England national rugby union players
