= Neil Bennett (rugby union) =

English rugby union player

- Born: 2 April 1951 (age 75) Ramsey, Isle of Man

Rugby union career
- Position: Fly-half
International career
| Years | Team | Apps | (Points) |
| 1975–1979 | England | 7 | (23) |

Neil Bennett (born 2 April 1951 in Ramsey, Isle of Man) is a rugby union player who played at Fly-half for England between 1975 and 1979.

Bennett was educated at St Luke's College and joined Bedford for the 1973/4 season. He made his international debut the following season against Scotland and kicked a penalty in a 7–6 victory. That season he played for Bedford in their RFU Knockout Cup victory over Rosslyn Park at Twickenham and won a further England cap against Australia at Sydney.

In 1977 Bennett joined London Welsh and appeared in all four of England's matches in the 1979 Five Nations Championship. During his career at international level he won 7 England caps and scored 2 tries and five penalties for 23 test points.

In later life he was Head of Sport at Cranleigh School in Surrey and teaches Mathematics.
