= Roger Blyth =

Wales international rugby union player & coach

- Full name: William Roger Blyth
- Born: 2 April 1950 (age 76) Swansea, Wales

Rugby union career
- Position: Fullback
International career
| Years | Team | Apps | (Points) |
| 1974–80 | Wales | 6 | (6) |

William Roger Blyth (born 2 April 1950) is a Welsh rugby union administrator and former international.

Born in Swansea, Blyth is the son of 1950s Wales flanker Len Blyth and was educated at Bishop Gore School. He played his rugby as a fullback and was capped six times for Wales, appearance in all four 1980 Five Nations matches. At club level, he was a prolific points-scorer for Swansea RFC across nearly 400 games. He was a member of Swansea's 1977/1978 WRU Challenge Cup triumph and his 2,374 career points has been bettered by only Mark Wyatt.

Blyth had a significant role in the formation of the Ospreys team, for which he has served as chairman, chief executive and managing director. He was awarded an honorary degree from Swansea University in 2017 for services to Welsh rugby.

== See also ==
- List of Wales national rugby union players
