= Guy Colomine =

France international rugby union player

- Born: 11 July 1955 (age 71) Narbonne, France
- Height: 6 ft 2 in (188 cm)
- Weight: 235 lb (107 kg)

Rugby union career
- Position: Prop
International career
Years	Team	Apps	(Points)
1979	France	1	(0)

Guy Colomine (born 11 July 1955) is a French former international rugby union player.

A hefty 235 lb prop, Colomine played his rugby for hometown club RC Narbonne.

Colomine was a member of the France squad for their 1979 tour of Fiji and New Zealand. He played in the one–off match against Fiji, which was an uncapped fixture, then appeared in the opening Test match against the All Blacks at Lancaster Park, but missed the remaining international fixture when they recorded a first ever win on New Zealand soil.

== See also ==
- List of France national rugby union players
