= François Sangalli =

French rugby union player (born 1952)

- Born: 8 September 1952 (age 74) Narbonne, France
- Height: 5 ft 8 in (173 cm)
- Weight: 172 lb (78 kg)

Rugby union career
- Position: Centre
International career
Years	Team	Apps	(Points)
1975–77	France	15	(4)

François Sangalli (born 8 September 1952) is a French former rugby union international.

Born to Italian immigrants in Narbonne, Sangalli was capped 15 times for France as a centre, debuting in 1975. He toured South Africa in his first year with the national side and had a significant role in France's 1977 Five Nations grand slam, with his 46th-minute try proving the difference in the 4–3 win over England at Twickenham.

Sangalli has had a long association with RC Narbonne, where he spent his entire playing career, the highlight of which was a Brennus Shield win in 1979. He served as club president during the early 1990s.

== See also ==
- List of France national rugby union players
