= Dominique Harize =

French rugby union player (born 1956)

- Born: 26 February 1956 (age 70) Saint-Céré, France

Rugby union career
- Position: Wing
Amateur team(s)
Years	Team	Apps	(Points)
1975-1982	Toulouse	107	
1982-1983	SC Albi		
1983-1986	CA Brive	20	
1986-	Cahors rugby		
International career
Years	Team	Apps	(Points)
1975-1977	France	9	(16)
1980	Barbarian RC	1	(5)
- Correct as of 2009-06-29

Dominique Harize (born 26 February 1956) is a former rugby union player who was capped 9 times. He played with France

Harize played as Wing for the Stade Toulousain. He was a member of the French team that won the Five Nations Championship in 1977 (Grand Slam) with the same fifteen players in all four matches and without conceding a try.
