= Christian Béguerie =

France international rugby union player

- Born: 26 July 1955 Layrac, France
- Died: 5 January 2024 (aged 68)
- Height: 6 ft 1 in (185 cm)
- Weight: 216 lb (98 kg)

Rugby union career
- Position: Back-row
International career
| Years | Team | Apps | (Points) |
| 1979 | France | 1 | (0) |

Christian Béguerie (26 July 1955 – 5 January 2024) was a French international rugby union player.

Béguerie hailed from Layrac in Lot-et-Garonne and came through the juniors of SU Agen.

A back rower, Béguerie was primarily a wing–forward and toured New Zealand with France in 1982. He debuted for France in a tour match against Waikato and played the opening Test match against the All Blacks in Christchurch.

Béguerie, who missed SU Agen's 1976 Brennus Shield win with appendicitis, was a member of the side which defeated Bayonne to claim the title in 1982. He suffered a knee ligament injury during the final.

== See also ==
- List of France national rugby union players
