= Pierre Pédeutour =

French rugby union player (born 1955)

- Born: 30 March 1955 (age 71) Menzel Bouzelfa, French Tunisia
- Height: 5 ft 9 in (175 cm)
- Weight: 154 lb (70 kg)

Rugby union career
- Position: Fly-half
International career
Years	Team	Apps	(Points)
1980	France	1	(3)

Pierre Pédeutour (born 30 March 1955) is a French former rugby union international.

Pédeutour was born in Menzel Bouzelfa, French Tunisia.

A fly-half, Pédeutour played for CA Bègles and RRC Nice. He was capped for France in a 1980 Five Nations match against Ireland at the Parc des Princes, with his drop-goal proving decisive in a one-point win.

== See also ==
- List of France national rugby union players
