= Patrick Mesny =

French rugby union player (born 1954)

- Born: 18 August 1954 (age 72) Montluçon, France
- Height: 6 ft 1 in (185 cm)
- Weight: 186 lb (84 kg)

Rugby union career
- Position: Centre
International career
Years	Team	Apps	(Points)
1979–82	France	14	(12)

Patrick Mesny (born 18 August 1954) is a French former rugby union international.

Born in Montluçon, Mesny spent most of his career with FC Grenoble, which he joined in 1974.

Mesny was capped 14 times for France from 1979 to 1982, scoring three tries. A centre, he debuted on the 1979 tour to New Zealand and played in both Test matches, including a historic first away win against the All Blacks. He featured twice during France's grand slam-winning 1981 Five Nations campaign.

== See also ==
- List of France national rugby union players
