= Manuel Carpentier =

French rugby union player

- Born: 15 October 1959 (age 67) Calais, France
- Height: 6 ft 6 in (198 cm)
- Weight: 221 lb (100 kg)

Rugby union career
- Position: No. 8 / Lock
International career
| Years | Team | Apps | (Points) |
| 1980–82 | France | 8 | (0) |

Manuel Carpentier (born 15 October 1959) is a French former international rugby union player.

Born in Calais, Carpentier was a youth product of FC Lourdes and made his senior debut at the age of 18.

Carpentier won eight France between 1980 and 1982, as a lock and number eight. He appeared on the 1980 tour of South Africa, 1981 tour of Australia and in three Five Nations campaigns, including the 1981 grand slam. In the 1983–1984 season, Carpentier left Lourdes to play for Stade Montois, then finished his career at La Teste-de-Buch.

== See also ==
- List of France national rugby union players
