= Triple Crown (rugby union) =

Rugby competition between Scotland, Wales, Ireland and England

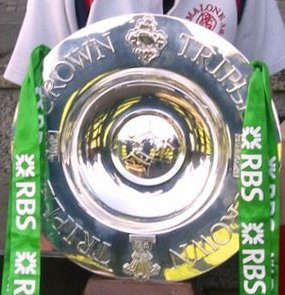
- Awarded for: winning all matches against the other Home Nations
- Country: England; Ireland; Scotland; Wales
- Presented by: Six Nations Rugby

History
- First award: 1883
- Most recent: Ireland (2026)
- Website: www.sixnationsrugby.com

In rugby union the Triple Crown is an honour contested annually by the "Home Nations" – i.e. England, Ireland, Scotland and Wales – who compete within the larger Six Nations Championship. If any one of these teams defeat all three other teams, they win the Triple Crown.

The Six Nations Championship also includes France and Italy, but their involvement in the tournament has no influence on the result of the Triple Crown. Hence, the winners of the Triple Crown are not necessarily the winners of the Championship as a whole.

England won the first Triple Crown – although the phrase was not in use at the time – in the inaugural 1883 series of the original rugby union Home Nations Championship. The latest winners of the Triple Crown are Ireland, who won it by beating Scotland at the Aviva Stadium in the 2026 Six Nations Championship.

Traditionally the Triple Crown was an informal honour with no trophy associated with it. However a trophy now exists, which has been awarded to Triple Crown winners since 2006.

== Name ==
The origins of the name Triple Crown are uncertain. The concept dates to the original Home Nations Championship, predecessor of the Six Nations Championship, when the competition only involved England, Ireland, Scotland and Wales. Like the modern Grand Slam, the Triple Crown was an informal honour to a team that won the Championship with straight victories.

The first use cited in the Oxford English Dictionary is from Whitaker's Almanack, 1900 (referring to the 1899 tournament): "In their last match at Cardiff against Wales, Ireland won by a try to nothing, securing the triple crown with three straight victories as in 1894." The Irish victory in 1894 was reported as a Triple Crown by The Irish Times at the time and is possibly the first time the phrase was seen in print.

The phrase Triple Crown is also used in a number of other sports.

== Trophy history ==
Until 2006, no actual trophy was awarded to the winner of the Triple Crown, hence it was sometimes referred to as the "invisible cup". Dave Merrington, a retired miner from South Hetton, County Durham, fashioned an aspiring trophy in 1975 from a lump of coal hewn from the Haig Colliery in Cumbria. This has a crown sitting on a four-sided base on which are represented a rose, a shamrock, a thistle and the Prince of Wales's feathers. It is kept in the Museum of Rugby at Twickenham.

For the 2006 Six Nations, the Royal Bank of Scotland (the primary sponsor of the competition) commissioned Edinburgh and London based Hamilton & Inches to design and create a dedicated Triple Crown Trophy. This has been awarded to Triple Crown winning sides since 2006. It has been won seven times by Ireland, four times by Wales and three times by England.

== Winners ==
There has been a Triple Crown winner in 73 of the 130 competitions held from 1883 through to 2026 (twelve years of competition were not played due to the two World Wars). The 2026 campaign was the most recent edition when a triple crown was awarded, with Ireland claiming the honour for the fourth time in five years (2022, 2023, 2025 and 2026). The last Welsh Triple Crown was in 2021, the last English Triple Crown in 2020, and the last Scottish Triple Crown from 1990 during the Five Nations era of the Championship

Wales and England have both retained the Triple Crown for four consecutive years: Wales (1976–1979) and England (1995–1998). Scotland and Ireland have never won the Triple Crown for more than two successive Championships.

It is possible to win the Triple Crown without also winning that year's Championship. France and Italy may win either the tournament or Grand Slam while a home nation completes the Triple Crown and on rare occasions, it is possible for one home nation to win the Triple Crown, while another claims the Championship title (but not the Grand Slam). To date, the Triple Crown winners who failed to win the Championship are Wales in 1977, England in 1997, 1998, 2002 and 2014, and Ireland in 2004, 2006, 2007, 2022, 2025 and 2026. The champions were France on each occasion, apart from 2014 when Ireland were Six Nations champions despite losing to Triple Crown winners England, the first instance of a team winning the Triple Crown but losing the overall title to another team eligible for it. The 2025 Championship was the first where the Triple Crown winner was neither first nor second in the Championship, with Ireland finishing below France and England.

Triple Crown winners who succeeded only in sharing the Championship were England in 1954 (lost to France, shared the title with France and Wales) and 1960 (drew with France and shared the title with them), and Wales in 1988 (lost to France and shared the title with them). With the advent of game points, bonus points and points difference, sharing the Championship is no longer possible.

The following table shows the number of Triple Crown wins by each country, and the years and Championship formats in which they were achieved.

italics : did not win Championship; underlined: shared championship : bold : won Grand Slam

Nation	Total Triple Crowns	Home Nations 1883-1910	Five Nations 1911-1928	Home Nations 1929-1946	Five Nations 1947-1999	Six Nations 2000-2026
England	26	1883, 1884, 1892	**1913, 1914, 1921, 1923, 1924, 1928**	1934, 1937	1954, **1957,** 1960, **1980**, **1991, 1992, 1995,** 1996, 1997, 1998	2002, **2003,** 2014, **2016**, 2020
Wales	22	1893, 1900, 1902, 1905, **1908, 1909**	**1911**		**1950, 1952,** 1965, 1969, **1971, 1976,** 1977, **1978**, 1979, 1988	**2005, 2008, 2012, 2019,** 2021
Ireland	15	1894, 1899			**1948,** 1949, 1982, 1985	2004, 2006, 2007, **2009, 2018,** 2022, **2023,** 2025, 2026
Scotland	10	1891, 1895, 1901, 1903, 1907	**1925**	1933, 1938	**1984, 1990**	

The following table shows Triple Crown winners chronologically.

Year	Team	Notes
Home Nations Championship
1883	England	(Note: Won the Championship outright that year with the Triple Crown.)
1884	England	
1891	Scotland	
1892	England	
1893	Wales	
1894	Ireland	
1895	Scotland	
1899	Ireland	
1900	Wales	
1901	Scotland	
1902	Wales	
1903	Scotland	
1905	Wales	
1907	Scotland	
1908	Wales	
1909	Wales	
Five Nations Championship
1911	Wales	(Note: Won the Grand Slam in addition to the Triple Crown.)
1913	England	
1914	England	
1915–19	Not held due to World War I	
1921	England	
1923	England	
1924	England	
1925	Scotland	
1928	England	
Home Nations Championship
1933	Scotland	
1934	England	
1937	England	
1938	Scotland	
1940–46	Not held due to World War II	
Five Nations Championship
1948	Ireland	
1949	Ireland	
1950	Wales	
1952	Wales	
1954	England	(Note: Shared the Championship in this year despite winning the Triple Crown.)
1957	England	
1960	England	
1965	Wales	
1969	Wales	
1971	Wales	
1976	Wales	
1977	Wales	(Note: France won the Grand Slam in this year.)
1978	Wales	
1979	Wales	
1980	England	
1982	Ireland	
1984	Scotland	
1985	Ireland	
1988	Wales	
1990	Scotland	
1991	England	
1992	England	
1995	England	
1996	England	
1997	England	
1998	England	
Six Nations Championship
2002	England	
2003	England	
2004	Ireland	
2005	Wales	
2006	Ireland	(Note: France won the Championship in this year.)
2007	Ireland	
2008	Wales	
2009	Ireland	
2012	Wales	
2014	England	(Note: Ireland won the Championship in this year.)
2016	England	
2018	Ireland	
2019	Wales	
2020	England	
2021	Wales	
2022	Ireland	
2023	Ireland	
2025	Ireland	
2026	Ireland	

== See also ==
- Grand Slam
- Pacific Tri-Nations
- Rugby union trophies and awards
- Six Nations Wooden Spoon
- Tri Nations
