= Frédéric Costes =

French rugby union player (born 1957)

- Born: 27 June 1957 (age 69) La Rochelle, France
- Height: 5 ft 10 in (178 cm)
- Weight: 153 lb (69 kg)

Rugby union career
- Position: Wing
International career
Years	Team	Apps	(Points)
1979–80	France	7	(4)

Frédéric Costes (born 27 June 1957) is a French former rugby union international.

Born in La Rochelle, Costes learnt his rugby in Châteauroux with RACC and developed into a winger after showing proficiency as a sprinter. He played his early senior rugby with Stade Clermontois while studying at university.

Costes, joining AS Montferrand in 1977, was the top try scorer in the 1978–79 French Championship and during his three seasons at the club earned his seven France caps. He scored a try on debut against England at Twickenham in the 1979 Five Nations Championship and at Eden Park later that year notably played in France's first ever defeat of the All Blacks on New Zealand soil, kicking the ball into touch to secure a 5–point win.

During the 1980s, Costes had another stint with Stade Clermontois and also played for RRC Nice.

Costes has since relocated to Nouméa, where he is a teacher.

== See also ==
- List of France national rugby union players
