= Daniel Bustaffa =

France international rugby union player

- Born: 11 January 1956 (age 70) Carcassonne, France
- Height: 5 ft 11 in (180 cm)
- Weight: 187 lb (85 kg)

Rugby union career
- Position: Wing
International career
Years	Team	Apps	(Points)
1977–80	France	11	(4)

Daniel Bustaffa (born 11 January 1956) is a French former international rugby union player.

Bustaffa was born in Carcassonne and educated at Bertrande secondary school in Cuxac-Cabardès, where he learned rugby under former Racing Club de France player and US Carcassonne coach Pierre Conquet.

A wing three–quarter, Bustaffa played for US Carcassonne and was a member of their 2nd division championship–winning team in the 1974–75 season. He was capped 11 times for the national team from 1977 to 1980, undertaking tours of Argentina, New Zealand and South Africa during this period.

Bustaffa became a wine grower in Aigues-Vives, Aude.

== See also ==
- List of France national rugby union players
