= Dougie Morgan =

British Lions & Scotland international rugby union player (1947–2020)

- Born: Douglas Waugh Morgan; 9 March 1947 Edinburgh, Scotland
- Died: 5 April 2020 (aged 73) Edinburgh, Scotland
- Notable relative: Charlie Shiel (grandson)

Rugby union career
- Position: Scrum-half
Amateur team(s)
Years	Team	Apps	(Points)
- Stewart's Melville
Provincial / State sides
Years	Team	Apps	(Points)
- Edinburgh District
International career
Years	Team	Apps	(Points)
1973–1978	Scotland	21	(71)
1977	British and Irish Lions	2	(9)

Douglas Waugh Morgan (9 March 1947 – 5 April 2020) was a Scotland international rugby union player. In 1977 he toured New Zealand with the British and Irish Lions and at the time played club rugby for Stewart's Melville FP.

== Rugby Union career ==
=== Amateur career ===
He played for Stewart's Melville.

=== Provincial career ===
He was capped by Edinburgh District.

=== International career ===
Morgan played 21 full internationals for Scotland between 1973 and 1978 and captained the team in the 1978 Five Nations Championship. He was also capped twice by the Lions against New Zealand on the 1977 tour. After retiring as a player Morgan moved into coaching and coached the Scotland team from 1993 to 1995.

== Death ==
He died on 4 April 2020, aged 73 from COVID-19.
