= Alain Maleig =

France international rugby union player

- Born: 10 July 1952 (age 74) Oloron-Sainte-Marie, France
- Height: 6 ft 2 in (188 cm)
- Weight: 229 lb (104 kg)

Rugby union career
- Position: Lock / No. 8
International career
| Years | Team | Apps | (Points) |
| 1979–80 | France | 7 | (0) |

Alain Maleig (born 10 July 1952) is a French former international rugby union player.

Maleig was raised in Oloron-Sainte-Marie and started his career with FC Oloron.

A forward, Maleig played his rugby primarily in the second row, but could also be utilised as a number eight. He made his international debut against Wales in a home 1979 Five Nations fixture. Most notably, Maleig featured in the France team which defeated the All Blacks at Eden Park during their 1979 tour, which was the first time they had won an international on New Zealand tour. He switched to Stadoceste Tarbais after obtaining international selection and finished with seven caps during his two years representing France.

== See also ==
- List of France national rugby union players
