= Roger Aguerre =

French rugby union player (born 1957)

- Born: 13 March 1957 (age 69) Mauléon-Licharre, France
- Height: 6 ft 0 in (183 cm)
- Weight: 169 lb (77 kg)

Rugby union career
- Position: Fly-half
International career
Years	Team	Apps	(Points)
1979	France	1	(6)

Roger Aguerre (born 13 March 1957) is a French former rugby union international.

Aguerre, born in the town of Mauléon-Licharre, comes from France's Basque region. He played his early rugby with SA Mauléon, before joining the Biarritz club in 1976.

In 1979, Aguerre was selected from Biarritz to play fly-half for France in their Five Nations match against Scotland at the Parc des Princes. He kicked a penalty and drop goal in a 21–17 France win.

== See also ==
- List of France national rugby union players
