= Patrick Salas =

France international rugby union player

- Born: 3 March 1954 Narbonne, Aude, France
- Died: 8 January 2017 (aged 62) Narbonne, Aude, France
- Height: 6 ft 2 in (188 cm)
- Weight: 237 lb (108 kg)

Rugby union career
- Position: Forward
International career
Years	Team	Apps	(Points)
1979–82	France	7	(0)

Patrick Salas (3 March 1954 – 8 January 2017) was a French international rugby union player.

Salas grew up in the town of Bages on the outskirts of Narbonne. He spent his entire career with RC Narbonne and featured in their 1979 Brennus Shield–winning team, to go with three Challenge Yves du Manoir triumphs.

Capped seven times, Salas was a member of the French team between 1979 and 1982. His most notable contribution came as the France number eight in their historic win over the All Blacks at Eden Park in 1979. He was primarily a second row forward, but was utilised out of position in the back row due to the late withdrawal of Christian Béguerie.

== See also ==
- List of France national rugby union players
