= Paul McNaughton =

Irish athlete (1952–2022)

Personal information
- Full name: Paul Peter Patrick McNaughton
- Born: 17 November 1952 Dublin, Ireland
- Died: November 2022 (aged 69)

Playing information
- Position: Centre
Club
Years	Team	Pld	T	G	FG	P
	Rugby Union
	Greystones RFC
	Wanderers
	Soccer
	Shelbourne
	Bray Wanderers A.F.C.
	Total	0	0	0	0	0
Representative
Years	Team	Pld	T	G	FG	P
	Leinster
	Ireland

Paul Peter Patrick McNaughton (18 November 1952 – November 2022) was an Irish rugby union, soccer and GAA player during the 1970s and 1980s. He was also manager of the Irish Rugby Team, a position he held from 2008 to 2011. He played rugby as a centre, with Leinster, Ireland, Chicago Lions, Los Angeles Rugby Club, Greystones and Wanderers. Although better known as a rugby player, he also played soccer for both Shelbourne and Bray Wanderers A.F.C. To add to his array of sporting achievements, McNaughton represented Wicklow GAA in both senior football and minor hurling, making him the only person to play three sports in Ireland's national stadiums.

== Playing career ==
=== Ireland ===
McNaughton won 15 caps for Ireland between 1978 and 1981. He made his international debut against Scotland at Lansdowne Road. In 1979, he went on the Ireland tour of Australia. His international career came to a halt at the peak of his sporting career when he emigrated to Chicago while working with IDA Ireland.

=== Chicago ===
McNaughton joined the Chicago Lions Rugby Football Club in 1982 and played until 1984. Paul was named co-captain for the 1983 season. That year he led the Lions to the final four for the USA Rugby National Club Championship held in Palo Alto, CA.

=== Los Angeles ===
McNaughton joined the Los Angeles Rugby Club for the 1984 and 1985 seasons. The club made it to the 1984 USA Rugby National Club Championship held in Hartford Connecticut, where they lost in the final to the Dallas Harlequins. The Harlequins had noted South African Naas Botha playing as their flyhalf. McNaughton was a member of the Los Angeles club in 1985, but played little due to injury.

=== Leinster ===
McNaughton was a regular on the Leinster Rugby team between 1977 and 1981 when he emigrated.

=== Greystones ===
Greystones RFC was where Paul began and ended his rugby career. He left Greystones while it was still a Junior side to play for Wanderers FC in the Senior League. He then returned to Greystones to captain their first match in the Senior League. Paul went on to become coach and then president of the club.

=== Soccer ===
While playing rugby, McNaughton also played semi-professional soccer with Bray Wanderers A.F.C. and Shelbourne. In his first full season with Shels he played in the UEFA Cup against Vasas SC. He played in two FAI Cup finals with Shels losing both in 1973 and 1975. McNaughton also represented Ireland at both university and amateur level during his career as a soccer player.

=== GAA ===
McNaughton had a brief spell with the Wicklow GAA senior football team. His overwhelming commitments to both rugby and soccer ended his involvement in that arena. He had previously represented Wicklow in minor hurling, the sport which he was most enthusiastic about when growing up.

== Later years ==
=== Business career ===
Paul McNaughton has over 25 years experience in the Banking/Finance, Fund Management & Securities Processing Industries. McNaughton spent 10 years with IDA (Ireland) both in Dublin and in the USA marketing Ireland as a location for multinational investment. He went on to establish Bank of Ireland's IFSC Fund's business before joining Deutsche Bank to establish their funds business in Ireland. He was overall Head of Deutsche Bank's Offshore Funds business, including their hedge fund administration businesses primarily based in Dublin and the Cayman Islands, before assuming the role of Global Head of Deutsche's Fund Servicing business worldwide. Mr. McNaughton left Deutsche Bank in August 2004 after leading the sale of Deutsche's Global Custody and Funds businesses to State Street Bank for US$1.5 billion. As from September 2004, Mr. McNaughton acted as an advisor and non-executive director for several investment companies and other financial entities in Ireland including several alternative/hedge fund entities. He was the founding Chairman of the IFIA (Irish Funds Industry Association) and a member of the Irish Government Task Force on Mutual Fund Administration. He was instrumental in the growth of the funds business in Ireland both for traditional and alternative asset classes. Mr. McNaughton held an Honours Economics Degree from Trinity College Dublin.

=== Leinster Rugby Team ===
McNaughton was appointed Director of Rugby at Leinster in 2005. After two years in that position, he became chairman of the board at Leinster. During his time at Leinster, he was known for his battles with Irish Coach Eddie O'Sullivan over the IRFU's control over Leinster and O'Sullivan's delayed release of Leinster players after Ireland training camps.

=== Ireland Rugby Team ===
In May 2008, McNaughton was appointed manager of the Irish Rugby team, working alongside head coach Declan Kidney, a partnership previously held at Leinster. McNaughton won the 2009 Grand Slam with Ireland. He announced his resignation from the position shortly after the 2011 World Cup, agreeing to stay on and help in the search for an appropriate replacement.

== Death ==
McNaughton died in November 2022, at the age of 69.

== Sources ==
- Fitzpatrick, Seán Shelbourne Cult Heroes (2009, Colour Books) ISBN 978-1-905483-67-9
