= Serge Gabernet =

French rugby union player (born 1955)

- Born: 6 February 1955 (age 71) Montréjeau, France
- Height: 6 ft 1 in (185 cm)
- Weight: 188 lb (85 kg)

Rugby union career
- Position: Fullback
International career
| Years | Team | Apps | (Points) |
| 1980–83 | France | 14 | (48) |

Serge Gabernet (born 6 February 1955) is a French former rugby union international.

Gabernet, born in Montréjeau, joined Stade Toulousain in 1974 and spent the rest of his career at the club.

A fullback for France between 1980 and 1983, Gabernet gained 14 caps and was a grand glam winner in the 1981 Five Nations, playing all four matches. This included scoring a try and two penalties goals in the win over Wales.

Gabernet captained the Stade Toulousain sides that were back to back French champions in 1984–85 and 1985–86.

== See also ==
- List of France national rugby union players
