= Colin Patterson (rugby union) =

Irish rugby union player

- Born: Colin Stewart Patterson; 3 March 1955 (age 71) Belfast, Northern Ireland
- Height: 164 cm (5 ft 5 in)
- Weight: 72 kg (11 st 5 lb; 159 lb)

Rugby union career
- Position: Scrum-half
Amateur team(s)
Years	Team	Apps	(Points)
- Instonians
International career
Years	Team	Apps	(Points)
1978-1980	Ireland	11	(20)
1980	British Lions	3	(0)

Colin Stewart Patterson (born 3 March 1955) is a former international rugby union player who played club rugby for Instonians, represented Ulster, won 11 caps for Ireland and toured South Africa in 1980 with the British and Irish Lions. He made ten appearances for the Lions, including three Tests, before a very bad injury ended his playing career.

Patterson studied law at Bristol and played for English Universities and British Universities. He rejoined Instonians on his return to Ireland and was selected for Ulster and capped by Ireland B in 1977 before winning his first full cap for Ireland against New Zealand in 1978. He won eleven senior caps and scored five tries for Ireland. His career came to a premature end when he suffered a serious knee injury playing against Griqualand West during the 1980 British Lions tour to South Africa, after having been scrum-half in the first three internationals against South Africa.

Patterson had a career as a solicitor. He is married to Trisha and is father to sons Graeme and Jonny as well as having a stepson, Stephen.

His son Jonny captained the Regent House Grammar School side that reached the Ulster Schools Cup final in 2008.
