= Terry Kennedy (rugby union, born 1954) =

Irish rugby union player

- Full name: Terence Joseph Kennedy
- Born: 19 October 1954 (age 72) Dublin, Ireland

Rugby union career
- Position: Wing
International career
Years	Team	Apps	(Points)
1978–81	Ireland	13	(4)

Terence Joseph Kennedy (born 19 October 1954) is an Irish former rugby union international.

A St Mary's College product, Kennedy was a winger known as "the Rat" who played for Leinster at provincial level and earned 13 Test caps for Ireland, debuting against the All Blacks at Lansdowne Road in 1978. He was a member of Ireland's historic 1979 series win in Australia, which the first triumph by a home nation in a southern hemisphere country.

Kennedy's son Terry is an Ireland rugby seven representative.

== See also ==
- List of Ireland national rugby union players
