= Robert Paparemborde =

France international rugby union player and administrator (1948–2001)

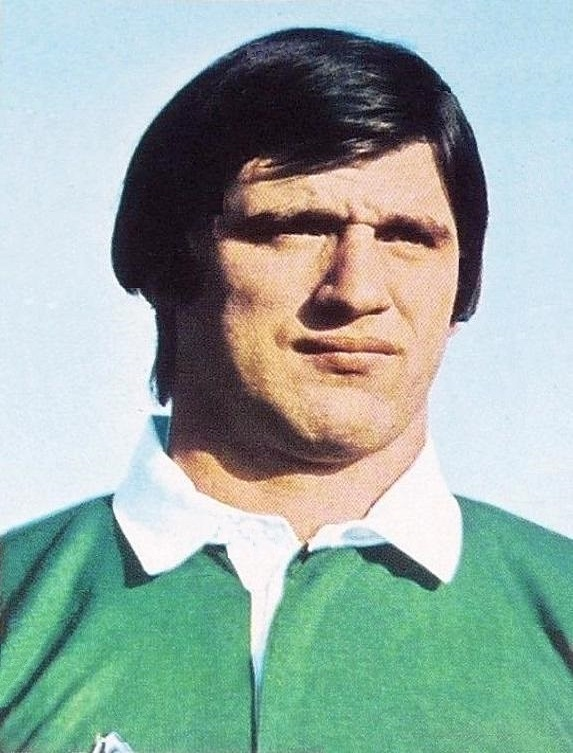
- Robert Paparemborde in 1971, wearing the Section Paloise jersey.
- Born: Robert Pierre Paparemborde; 5 July 1948 Ance, France
- Died: 18 April 2001 (aged 52) Paris, France
- Height: 1.82 m (5 ft 11 1/2 in)
- Occupation: Shopkeeper then rugby administration

Rugby union career
- Position: Tighthead prop
Youth career
- 1966–1969: Section Paloise
Senior career
Years	Team	Apps	(Points)
1969–1983	Section Paloise		
1983–1984	Racing CF		
International career
Years	Team	Apps	(Points)
1975–1983	France	54	(40)
Coaching career
- Years: Team
- Racing CF

Robert Paparemborde (French pronunciation: [ʁɔbɛʁ papɑʁɑ̃bɔʁd]; 5 July 1948 – 18 April 2001) was a French rugby union player, known for playing as a tighthead prop. He had a distinguished career with Section Paloise and Racing Club de France, and represented the French national team from 1975 to 1983. Paparemborde won three Five Nations Championship titles, including two Grand Slams in 1977 and 1981, and victory in 1983. Considered one of the world's top props during the 1970s, he later served in key roles in French rugby, including vice president of the FFR.

== Early life ==
Robert Paparemborde was born on 5 July 1948, in Ance, located in the Barétous Valley of Béarn. Growing up in Laruns, he excelled in athletics, judo, and handball, winning the French cadet judo championship in 1964 and later representing France at the junior level in handball. He began rugby at the Louis-Barthou high school, playing for the Coquelicots de Pau, and led the team to a French high school championship in 1966. He was recognized as an international school rugby player in 1967.

=== Section Paloise ===
At 18, Robert Paparemborde joined Section Paloise, initially playing as a center and winger before settling as a tighthead prop. His early career saw significant moments, such as a standout performance in the 1968 Coupe de France against SU Agen. Over the years, he became a crucial player for the team, contributing to their victory in the 1970 Challenge Antoine-Béguère. In 1983, despite being offered the role of head coach, Paparemborde decided to leave the club after many years of dedication.

=== Racing Club de France ===
After 17 years at Section Paloise, Robert Paparemborde joined Racing Club de France, where he was offered a role in public relations with Banania. Although Racing's matches were often in modest stadiums, Paparemborde played a key part in their promotion back to Groupe A for his final season. He later became coach and president of Racing, leading the team to the French Championship in 1990 as technical director and to the finals in 1987 as coach.

=== International career ===
Robert Paparemborde had a distinguished international career with the French national team from 1975 to 1983. As a tighthead prop, he helped France win the Five Nations Championship three times, including two Grand Slams in 1977 and 1981. He was also part of the historic 1979 team that defeated the All Blacks in New Zealand. With 54 caps and seven tries, he retired as the record-holder for most caps by a French prop.

Additionally, he co-founded the French Barbarians and captained them in several matches.

== Legacy ==
He was regarded as one of the greatest prop-forwards and was a member of the French team that won the Five Nations Championship in 1977 (Grand Slam), 1981(Grand Slam), and 1983.

He also played for a World XV on 9 August 1980 against Argentina in Buenos Aires, losing 36-22.

Robert Paparemborde's legacy is honored in multiple ways. Since 2003, the rugby stadium in Laruns bears his name. In 2009, a collège Robert-Paparemborde was opened in Colombes, and in 2013, the Espace Paparemborde was created at the Auteuil racecourse in Paris. Despite never playing at the Stade du Hameau for Section Paloise, there was a proposal to rename it after him when François Bayrou became mayor of Pau in 2014, as part of the renovation project.

== Personal life ==
He died of pancreatic cancer on 18 April 2001 in the 14th arrondissement of Paris.
