= Mike Biggar =

Scotland international rugby union player

- Born: Michael Andrew Biggar; 20 November 1949 (age 76) Aberdeen, Scotland
- University: University of Cambridge
- Notable relative(s): Alastair Biggar, cousin

Rugby union career
- Position: Flanker
Amateur team(s)
Years	Team	Apps	(Points)
- Cambridge University
- London Scottish
Provincial / State sides
Years	Team	Apps	(Points)
- Anglo-Scots
International career
Years	Team	Apps	(Points)
1975	Scotland 'B'	1	
1975-80	Scotland	24	(0)

Mike Biggar (born 20 November 1949) is a former Scotland international rugby union player.

== Rugby Union career ==
=== Amateur career ===
Biggar was educated at Sedbergh School in Cumbria, where he was Head of School, then went up to Queens' College, Cambridge, where he read Law and won a Blue in rugby in 1971.

He went on to play for London Scottish.

=== Provincial career ===
He played for the Anglo-Scots district.

=== International career ===
He was capped by Scotland 'B' to play against France 'B' in 1975.

He appeared for Scotland in 24 international matches between 1975 and 1980, four times as captain.

=== Administrative career ===
He is a vice-president of Minety Rugby Club.

== Car accident and health ==
In 1992, he was involved in an automobile accident in which he sustained severe head injuries and became disabled, requiring a wheelchair and unable to walk without difficulty.

In 2020, during the COVID-19 pandemic, while recovering from a debilitating kidney infection, and inspired by Captain Tom Moore, he decided to try to raise £1,000 for NHS Charities Together by walking 100 steps in a month. As of 10 August 2021, he had raised over £87,000 via JustGiving.

== Family ==
He lives in Malmesbury, Wiltshire, with his wife Ali. Fellow London Scottish and Scotland player Alastair Biggar was his cousin.
