= Jean-François Marchal =

France international rugby union player

- Born: 16 December 1949 Paris, France
- Died: 8 August 2018 (aged 68)
- Height: 6 ft 5 in (196 cm)
- Weight: 241 lb (109 kg)

Rugby union career
- Position: Lock
International career
Years	Team	Apps	(Points)
1979–80	France	5	(4)

Jean-François Marchal (16 December 1949 — 8 August 2018), born Jean-François Majchrowski, was a French rugby union player active in the 1970s and 1980s.

Marchal was born in Paris to a Polish father and a Lithuanian mother. After receiving naturalization in 1963, the family surname was changed from Majchrowski to sound more French.

A lock, Marchal won a French junior championship with Racing Club de France, then linked up with FC Lourdes through a contact he had met while serving in the military. Capped five times for France, he toured New Zealand with the national team in 1979 and featured in two Five Nations campaigns. He was on the FC Lourdes team which won the 1981 Challenge Yves du Manoir, during which he suffered an injury that contributed to his retirement three years later.

Marchal became a hotelier in Lourdes.

== See also ==
- List of France national rugby union players
