= Francis Haget =

France international rugby union player

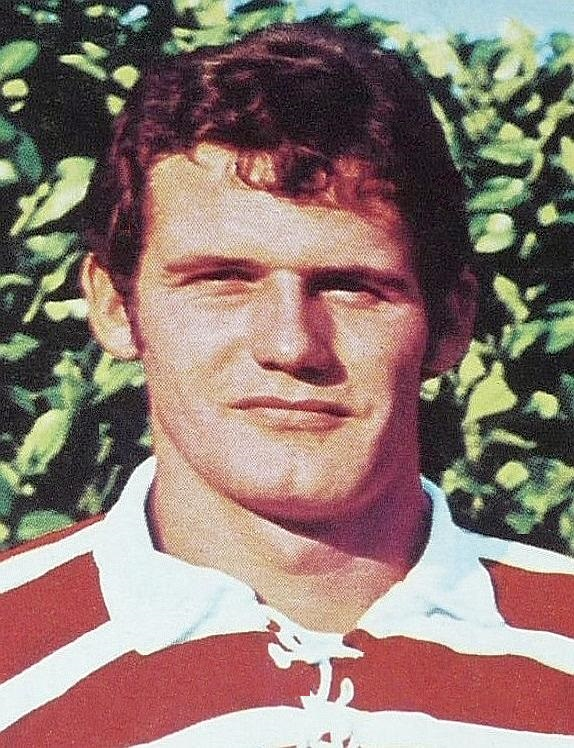
Francis Haget

Francis Haget (born Sauveterre-de-Béarn, 1 October 1949) is a French former international rugby union player. He played as a lock.

He played for SU Agen, Mont-de-Marsan and Biarritz Olympique.

He had 40 caps for France during his career, between 1974 and 1987, scoring 1 try and 4 points on aggregate. He had his first cap at the 20-15 win over Argentina, in Buenos Aires, on 20 June 1974, aged 24 years old, in a tour. He played in 8 editions of the Five Nations Championship, in 1976, 1978, 1979, 1980, 1984, 1985, 1986 and 1987. He won twice, in 1986, ex-aequo with Scotland, and in 1987, with a Grand Slam. He played twice at the 1987 Rugby World Cup, when he had his last cap in the 31-16 win over Fiji, in Auckland, on 7 June 1987, aged 37 years old.
