= Jean-Luc Averous =

French rugby union player (born 1954)

- Born: 22 October 1954 (age 72) Béziers, France
- Height: 6 ft 2 in (188 cm)
- Weight: 188 lb (85 kg)

Rugby union career
- Position: Wing
International career
Years	Team	Apps	(Points)
1975–81	France	25	(28)

Jean-Luc Averous (born 22 October 1954) is a French former rugby union international.

Born in Béziers, Averous was a quick and powerful winger, capped 25 times for France between 1975 and 1981, scoring seven tries. He played in France's grand slam-winning 1977 Five Nations Championship campaign and was in the team that defeated the All Blacks at Eden Park in 1979, which was their first ever win in the country.

Averous played his club rugby with La Voulte Sportif.

== See also ==
- List of France national rugby union players
