= Allan Hosie =

Scottish rugby union referee (1945–2026)

- Born: Allan M. Hosie; 1945
- Died: 22 April 2026 (aged 80)

Rugby union career
Refereeing career
Years	Competition	Apps
1973–1984	Five Nations Championship	

116th President of the Scottish Rugby Union
- In office 2002–2003
- Preceded by: Robert Young
- Succeeded by: Bert Duffy

Allan M. Hosie (1945 – 22 April 2026) was a Scottish international referee and was the 116th President of the Scottish Rugby Union. He was given a Scotland referee cap in January 2025.

== Rugby union career ==
=== Referee career ===
When the yellow card was introduced to rugby union—in addition to the red card—Hosie stated: 'This is a bad move, some referees will use it as a get-out, brandishing a yellow card when it should be red.'

Hosie refereed 22 international matches before becoming Five Nations chairman in 1997.

=== Administrative career ===
Hosie was a committee member of the Five Nations Championship from 1992.

He became Chairman of the Five Nations Championship in 1997. He was also the Chairman of the Laws Committee of the IRB; and on the Four Home Unions tour committee. He served as chairman when the championship became the Six Nations Championship and remained there until 2002.

Hosie became the 115th President of the Scottish Rugby Union. He served the standard one year from 2001 to 2002.

== Personal life and death ==
Hosie died on 22 April 2026, at the age of 80.
