= David Richards (rugby union, born 1954) =

British Lions & Wales international rugby union footballer

- Born: David Stuart Richards; 23 May 1954 (age 72) Cwmgwrach, Neath Port Talbot, Wales
- Height: 177 cm (5 ft 10 in)
- Weight: 77 kg (12 st 2 lb)
- School: Neath Grammar School
- University: Cardiff College of Education
- Occupation: Sports teacher

Rugby union career
- Position: Centre
Amateur team(s)
Years	Team	Apps	(Points)
- Cwmgwrach RFC
1972-1986	Swansea RFC	311	(505)
1977-1984	Barbarian F.C.	8	(4)
International career
Years	Team	Apps	(Points)
1979–1983	Wales	17	(16)
1980	British Lions	1	(0)

David "Dai" Richards (born 23 May 1954) is a former Welsh international rugby union player. In 1980 he toured South Africa with the British Lions and at the time played club rugby for Swansea.

== Rugby career ==
Richards played on 17 occasions for Wales as a centre or wing, scoring four tries. He was brought into the Welsh side in 1979 for the Five Nations game against France in Paris in place of Llanelli's Ray Gravell. In hindsight, many observers believe it would have been better to have retained the Steve Fenwick/Ray Gravell centre partnership and moved David Richards to fly-half instead of Cardiff's Gareth Davies. Richards played fly-half for his club side Swansea and was much more effective in that position and indeed his greatest Welsh performance was against Scotland in 1980 when he moved from centre to fly-half when Davies was injured. he played a fine game and scored a magnificent try. He played 311 games for Swansea between 1972/73 and 1985/86, scoring 117 tries, and captained the club in 1981/82, 1982/83 and 1983/84. He toured with the 1980 British Lions to South Africa, playing seven games, including one international appearance. He was also a reserve for the 1977 British Lions tour to New Zealand. He was Welsh Rugby player of the year in 1980.

As well as representing the full Wales team, he also played for Wales B and was also picked for invitational touring side, the Barbarians. After his playing career he became a National selector for the Welsh Rugby Union.
