= Alain Caussade =

France international rugby union player

Alain Caussade (born Juillan, 27 July 1952) is a former French rugby union player. He played as a wing and a fly-half.

He played for FC Lourdes almost all of his career. He won the Challenge Yves du Manoir in 1981.

He had 12 caps for France, from 1978 to 1981, but he still was a prolific scorer. He scored 2 tries, 5 conversions, 3 penalties and 5 drop goals, 42 points on aggregate, even in a short international career. He played three times at the Five Nations Championship, in 1979, 1980 and 1981, in 8 games, scoring 1 try, 3 conversions, 1 penalty and 2 drop goals, 19 points on aggregate. He won the competition in 1981.
