= Peter Colston (rugby union) =

English rugby player and coach (died 2022)

Peter James Colston (died December 2022) was an English rugby union player and coach.

In a playing career which lasted from 1957 to 1967 he played 252 first team matches for Bristol, scoring 21 tries. He also played for the Gloucestershire and Somerset county teams.

After Colston's playing career ended he became Bristol's first official coach, and went on to coach the England under-23 team and finally the England national rugby union team from 1975 to 1979.

Preceded by John Burgess	English national rugby coach 1975-1979	Succeeded by Mike Davis
