= Jean-François Gourdon =

France international rugby union player

Jean-François Gourdon (born Paris, 28 September 1954) is a former French rugby union player. He played as a wing. His is professionally a consultant on risk management and an insurance broker. He is the son of a Ukrainian mother and a French father.

== Club career ==
Gourdon played for Paris Université Club, from 1966/67 to 1972/73. He moved to Racing Club de France, where he played from 1973/74 to 1975/76, and afterwards to Stade Bagnérais, since 1976/77. He was suspended from competition in 1977/78, but returned to Stade Bagnérais in 1978/79. He was runners-up of the Top 14 in 1978/79 and 1980/81.

One of the best French players of his generation, he was voted "Best wing" by the weekly Midy Olympique for five times, in 1974, 1975, 1976, 1979 and 1980.

== International career ==
He had 22 caps for France, from 1974 to 1980, scoring 12 tries, 48 points on aggregate. He played in seven Five Nations Championship tournaments, in 1974, 1975, 1976, 1978, 1979 and 1980. He had 15 caps, scoring 8 tries, 32 points on aggregate, during this time. He left international rugby to concentrate on his professional activities.
