= Jérôme Gallion =

French rugby union player (born 1955)

- Born: 4 April 1955 (age 71) Toulon, France
- Height: 1.72 m (5 ft 7 1/2 in)
- Weight: 75 kg (11 st 11 lb)

Rugby union career
- Position: scrum half
Amateur team(s)
Years	Team	Apps	(Points)
1975-1989	RC Toulonnais		
International career
Years	Team	Apps	(Points)
1978-1986	France	27	(40)

Jérôme Gallion (born 4 April 1955, in Toulon) is a retired French international rugby union scrum half for RC Toulonnais. He is now a dental surgeon.

Gallion made his international début for France in January 1978, against England, replacing the retired Jacques Fouroux.

== Honours ==
- French rugby champion, 1987.
- Challenge Yves du Manoir finalist 1987
- French championship finalist 1985 and 1989
