= Andy Irvine (rugby union) =

British Lions & Scotland international rugby union player

Andy Irvine MBE
- Born: Andrew Robertson Irvine; 16 September 1951 (age 75) Edinburgh, Scotland
- School: George Heriot's School
- University: Edinburgh University
- Occupation: Chartered Surveyor

Rugby union career
- Position: Fullback
Amateur team(s)
Years	Team	Apps	(Points)
- Heriot's
Provincial / State sides
Years	Team	Apps	(Points)
- Edinburgh District
International career
Years	Team	Apps	(Points)
1972	Scotland 'B'	1	(0)
1972–82	Scotland	51	(269)
1974–80	British Lions	9	(28)
–	Barbarians		
- Correct as of 26 October 2009
Coaching career
- Years: Team
- 2013: British & Irish Lions (tour manager)

119th President of the Scottish Rugby Union
- In office 2005–2007
- Preceded by: Gordon Dixon
- Succeeded by: George Jack

Andrew Robertson Irvine MBE (born 16 September 1951) is a former president of the Scottish Rugby Union (SRU), and a former Scottish international rugby player. He earned fifty one Scotland caps, captaining the team on fifteen occasions, and scored 250 points for Scotland. He went on three British Lions tours.

== Background ==
Irvine was born in Edinburgh, on 16 September 1951. He was educated at James Gillespie's Primary School and George Heriot's School. From there he went on to Edinburgh University where he graduated in Geography.

== Rugby Union career ==
=== Amateur career ===
Irvine originally played for Heriot's Rugby Club.

=== Provincial career ===
Irvine represented Edinburgh District in the Scottish Inter-District Championship.

=== International career ===
He played for Scotland 'B' against France 'B' on 11 November 1972.

As fullback for Scotland, Irvine won 51 caps, between 1972–82 and scored ten tries. His first cap was against the All Blacks in December 1972. His last international appearance was against Australia on 10 July 1982.

Irvine earned British Lions caps against South Africa (1974), New Zealand (1977) and South Africa (1980). He scored 156 points in fifteen games on the 1974 Lion tour. He also played for the Barbarians during their 1976 Easter Tour. In the 1974 tour, he adopted many South African tactics and styles of play, although J. P. R. Williams was preferred as full back for the tests, limiting Irvine to two test appearances on the wing.

Irvine vies with Ken Scotland, Gavin Hastings and Stuart Hogg for the title of Scotland's greatest ever fullback, with incisive running at a blistering pace from the back his trademark. A number of polls have voted Irvine Scotland's greatest player, and he is generally considered one of the best, if not the best, attacking full backs of his era. His presence in the line often distracted defenders even when he did not have possession.

=== Administrative career ===
In May 2005, Irvine announced his intention to stand for president of the Scottish Rugby Union. He was elected. He announced his readiness to stand for a second term at the end of March 2006. and was unopposed. He stepped down from the role in June 2007, having served the maximum of two years in the post.

In August 2010 Irvine was appointed as the first independent chairman of Celtic Rugby.

In March 2010 the Bill McLaren Foundation launched, with Irvine and John Rutherford directors.

Irvine was the tour manager of the 2013 British & Irish Lions tour to Australia. It was the first successful Lions' tour since 1997, with the Lions winning the series 2–1.

== Property career ==
After graduation Irvine followed a career in chartered surveying. In 2004, after 26 years at the property consultancy firm Jones Lang LaSalle, eight of them as managing director, he was appointed as chairman.

== Other activities ==
Irvine has appeared as a guest on BBC Radio Scotland's Sportsound radio programme to comment on international rugby games. He has also coached rugby at Heriot's Rugby Club.

== Personal life ==
Irvine and his wife Audrey had four children before separating. Irvine has a partner.

== Awards and honours ==
Irvine was made a Member of the Most Excellent Order of the British Empire (MBE) in the 1979 Birthday Honours for services to Rugby Football in Scotland.

In 2002 Irvine was inducted into the Scottish Sports Hall of Fame. He is an inductee of the International Rugby Hall of Fame.
