= Jean Desclaux =

French rugby union footballer and coach

- Born: Jean Pierre Desclaux; 25 June 1922 Dax, France
- Died: 23 March 2006 (aged 83) Dax, France

Rugby union career
- Position: Flanker
Amateur team(s)
Years	Team	Apps	(Points)
- Dax
Coaching career
- Years: Team
- 1958–1973: Dax
- 1973–1980: France

Jean Desclaux (25 June 1922 – 23 March 2006) was a French rugby union player and coach who played for US Dax as flanker.

Born in 1922 in Dax, he played and coached club rugby for US Dax only; as a player he served the club from 1947 to 1959 and represented France A eight times. As coach he managed US Dax from 1959 to 1973 winning two French Cups and joining the French Championship's final four times.

In 1973 Desclaux was appointed manager of the French national team, which he led to the victory in two Six Nations Championships, in 1973 and in 1977 (the latter achieving the Grand Slam). Another achievement was the victory in Auckland the 14 July 1979, the first ever against the All Blacks on their home field.

Once he got back to the US Dax in 1980 he went on coaching that club until 1994, winning the French Cup again in 1982.

After definitive retirement he was appointed President of US Dax.

He died in Dax on 23 March 2006 after a long illness.

Sporting positions
Preceded by (France) Fernand Cazenave	French National Rugby Union Coach; 1973 – 1980	Succeeded by (France) Jacques Fouroux
