= Jean-Michel Aguirre =

French rugby union player (born 1951)

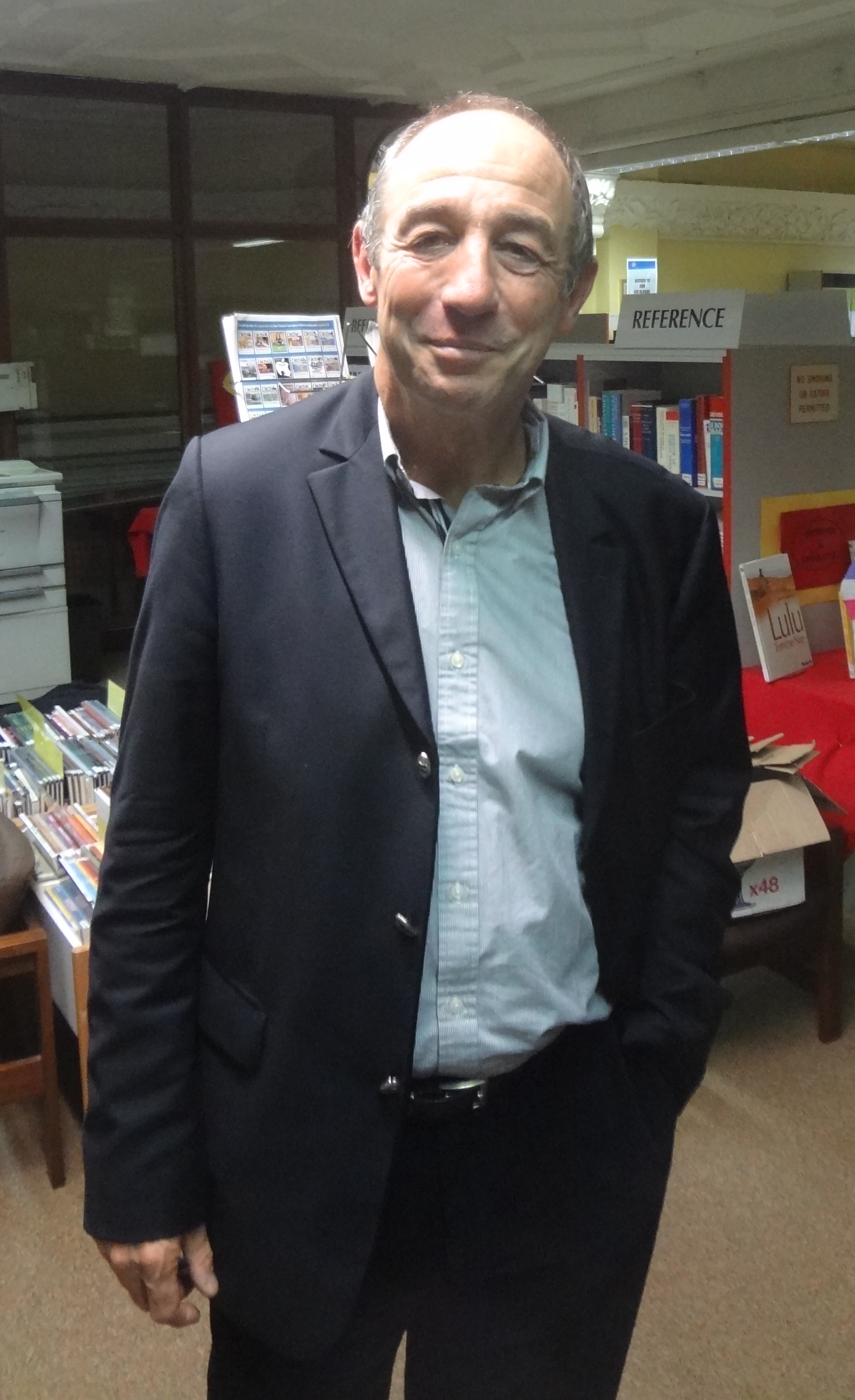
- Jean-Michel Aguirre in 2011
- Born: 2 November 1951 (age 75) Tostat, France
- Height: 6 ft 1 in (1.85 m)
- Weight: 186 lb (84 kg)

Rugby union career
- Position(s): Scrum-half, Fullback
Amateur team(s)
Years	Team	Apps	(Points)
- Stade Bagnérais
International career
Years	Team	Apps	(Points)
1971-1980	France	39	(123)

Jean-Michel Aguirre (born Tostat, 2 November 1951) is a former French rugby union player. He played as a Scrum-half and Fullback.

Aguirre played for Stade Bagnérais. He started his career as a Scrum-half but his usual positions became Fullback. Jean-Michel Aguirre earned his first national cap on 27 November 1971 against the Australia at Colombes.

== Honours ==
- Grand Slam : 1977.
- French rugby champion finalist, 1979, 1981 with Stade Bagnérais.
