= List of France national rugby union team tours =

This article is a list of tours by the France national rugby union team

== France Rugby Tours ==
| Year | To | Captain | Head coach | Result | Score |
|---|---|---|---|---|---|
| 1949 | Argentina | Guy Basquet | | Win | 2–0 |
| 1954 | Argentina and Chile | | | Win | 2–0 |
| 1958 | South Africa | Lucien Mias | Serge Saulnier | Win | 1–0 (1 Draw) |
| 1960 | Argentina | François Moncla | | Win | 3–0 |
| 1961 | New Zealand and Australia | François Moncla; Michel Crauste | | Lost; Win | 0–3 (New Zealand); 1–0 (Australia) |
| 1964 | South Africa | Michel Crauste | | Win | 1–0 |
| 1967 | South Africa | Christian Darrouy; Jacques Fort | | Drew | 1–1 (1 Draw) |
| 1968 | New Zealand and Australia | Claude Lacaze; Marcel Puget; Christian Carrère | | Lost; Lost | 0–3 (New Zealand); 0–1 (Australia) |
| 1971 | South Africa | Benoît Dauga | | Lost | 0–1 (1 Draw) |
| 1972 | Australia | Walter Spanghero | | Won | 1–0 (1 Draw) |
| 1974 | Brazil and Argentina | Olivier Saïsset | | Won; Won | 1–0 (Brazil); 2–0 (Argentina) |
| 1975 | South Africa | Richard Astre; Jacques Fouroux | | Lost | 0–2 |
| 1977 | Argentina | Jacques Fouroux | | Won | 1–0 (1 Draw) |
| 1979 | Fiji and New Zealand | Jean-Pierre Rives | | Won; Drew | 1–0 (Fiji); 1–1 (New Zealand) |
| 1980 | South Africa | Jean-Pierre Rives | | Lost | 0–1 |
| 1981 | Australia | Jean-Pierre Rives | | Lost | 0–2 |
| 1984 | New Zealand | Philippe Dintrans | | Lost | 0–2 |
| 1985 | Brazil, Argentina and Uruguay | Philippe Dintrans | | Won; Drew; Won | 1–0 (Brazil); 1–1 (Argentina); 1–0 (Uruguay) |
| 1986 | Argentina, Australia and New Zealand | Pierre Berbizier; Daniel Dubroca | | Drew; Lost; Lost | 1–1 (Argentina); 0–1 (Australia); 0–1 (New Zealand) |
| 1988 | Argentina and Paraguay | Pierre Berbizier | | Drew | 1–1 |
| 1989 | New Zealand | Pierre Berbizier | | Lost | 0–2 |
| 1990 | Australia | Serge Blanco | | Lost | 1–2 |
| 1991 | United States | | | Won | 2–0 |
| 1992 | Argentina | | | Won | 2–0 |
| 1993 | South Africa | Olivier Roumat | | Won | 1–0 (1 Draw) |
| 1994 | Canada and New Zealand | Philippe Saint-André | | Lost; Won | 0–1 (Canada); 2–0 (New Zealand) |
| 1996 | Argentina | | | Won | 2–0 |
| 1997 | Australia | Abdelatif Benazzi | | Lost | 0–2 |
| 1998 | Argentina and Fiji | | | Won; Won | 2–0 (Argentina); 1–0 (Fiji) |
| 1999 | Samoa, Tonga and New Zealand | Raphaël Ibañez | | Won; Lost; Lost | 1–0 (Samoa); 0–1 (Tonga); 0–1 (New Zealand) |
| 2001 | South Africa and New Zealand | Fabien Galthié | Bernard Laporte | Drew; Lost | 1–1 (South Africa); 0–1 (New Zealand) |
| 2002 | Argentina and Australia | Fabien Pelous; Raphaël Ibañez | Bernard Laporte | Lost; Lost | 0–1 (Argentina); 0–2 (Australia) |
| 2003 | Argentina and New Zealand | Fabien Galthié | Bernard Laporte | Lost; Lost | 0–2 (Argentina); 0–1 (New Zealand) |
| 2004 | United States and Canada | | Bernard Laporte | Won; Won | 1–0 (United States); 1–0 (Canada) |
| 2005 | South Africa and Australia | Jean-Baptiste Élissalde; Dimitri Yachvili | Bernard Laporte | Lost; Lost | 0–1 (1 Draw) (South Africa); 0–1 (Australia) |
| 2006 | Romania; South Africa | Fabien Pelous | Bernard Laporte | Won; Won | 1–0 (Romania); 1–0 (South Africa) |
| 2007 | New Zealand | Pascal Papé | Bernard Laporte | Lost | 0–2 |
| 2008 | Australia | Lionel Nallet | Marc Lièvremont | Lost | 0–2 |
| 2009 | New Zealand and Australia | Thierry Dusautoir | Marc Lièvremont | Drew; Lost | 1–1 (New Zealand); 0–1 (Australia) |
| 2010 | South Africa and Argentina | Thierry Dusautoir | Marc Lièvremont | Lost; Lost | 0–1 (South Africa); 0–1 (Argentina) |
| 2012 | Argentina | Pascal Papé | Philippe Saint-André | Drew | 1–1 |
| 2013 | New Zealand | Thierry Dusautoir | Philippe Saint-André | Lost | 0–3 |
| 2014 | Australia | Thierry Dusautoir | Philippe Saint-André | Lost | 0–3 |
| 2016 | Argentina | Yoann Maestri | Guy Novès | Win | 1–1 (30–46) |

== Stats of each Tour ==
=== Argentina ===
| Flag | Year | From | To | Test Matches | | | | Tour Matches | | | | Total Record | | | | | | | |
| Flag | Year | From | To | P | W | D | L | P | W | D | L | P | W | D | L | % | PF | PA | PD |
|---|---|---|---|---|---|---|---|---|---|---|---|---|---|---|---|---|---|---|---|
| (Argentina) | | | | X | X | X | X | – | | | | X | X | X | X | 0% | | | |
| (Argentina) | | | | X | X | X | X | – | | | | X | X | X | X | 0% | | | |
| (Argentina) | | | | X | X | X | X | – | | | | X | X | X | X | 0% | | | |
| (Argentina) | | | | X | X | X | X | – | | | | X | X | X | X | 0% | | | |
| (Argentina) | | | | X | X | X | X | – | | | | X | X | X | X | 0% | | | |
| (Argentina) | | | | X | X | X | X | – | | | | X | X | X | X | 0% | | | |
| (Argentina) | | | | X | X | X | X | – | | | | X | X | X | X | 0% | | | |
| (Argentina) | | | | X | X | X | X | – | | | | X | X | X | X | 0% | | | |
| (Argentina) | | | | X | X | X | X | – | | | | X | X | X | X | 0% | | | |
| (Argentina) | 2010 | | | 1 | 0 | 0 | 1 | – | | | | 1 | 0 | 0 | 1 | 0% | 13 | 41 | -28 |
| (Argentina) | 2012 | 16 June 2012 | 23 June 2012 | 2 | 1 | 0 | 1 | – | | | | 2 | 1 | 0 | 1 | 50% | 69 | 33 | 36 |

=== Australia ===
| Flag | Year | From | To | Test Matches | | | | Tour Matches | | | | Total Record | | | | | | | |
| Flag | Year | From | To | P | W | D | L | P | W | D | L | P | W | D | L | % | PF | PA | PD |
|---|---|---|---|---|---|---|---|---|---|---|---|---|---|---|---|---|---|---|---|
| (Australia) | 2008 | | | 2 | 0 | 0 | 2 | – | – | – | – | 2 | 0 | 0 | 2 | 0% | 23 | 74 | -51 |
| (Australia) | 2009 | | | 1 | 0 | 0 | 1 | – | – | – | – | 1 | 0 | 0 | 1 | 0% | 6 | 22 | -16 |

=== South Africa ===
| Flag | Year | From | To | Test Matches | | | | Tour Matches | | | | Total Record | | | | | | | |
| Flag | Year | From | To | P | W | D | L | P | W | D | L | P | W | D | L | % | PF | PA | PD |
|---|---|---|---|---|---|---|---|---|---|---|---|---|---|---|---|---|---|---|---|
| (South Africa) | 1958 | 12 July | 16 August | 2 | 1 | 1 | 0 | 8 | 4 | 1 | 3 | 10 | 5 | 2 | 3 | 50% | 137 | 124 | 13 |
| (South Africa) | 1964 | 11 July | 29 July | 1 | 1 | 0 | 0 | 5 | 4 | 0 | 1 | 6 | 5 | 0 | 1 | 83.33% | 117 | 55 | 62 |
| (South Africa) | 1967 | 5 July | 12 August | 4 | 1 | 1 | 2 | 9 | 7 | 0 | 2 | 13 | 8 | 1 | 4 | 61.54% | 209 | 161 | 48 |
| (South Africa) | 1971 | 22 May | 19 June | 2 | 0 | 1 | 1 | 7 | 7 | 0 | 0 | 9 | 7 | 1 | 1 | 77.78% | 228 | 92 | 136 |
| (South Africa) | 1975 | 31 May | 28 June | 2 | 0 | 0 | 2 | 9 | 6 | 1 | 2 | 11 | 6 | 1 | 4 | 54.55% | 282 | 180 | 102 |
| (South Africa) | 1980 | 29 October | 8 November | 1 | 0 | 0 | 1 | 3 | 2 | 0 | 1 | 4 | 3 | 0 | 1 | 75% | 90 | 95 | –5 |
| (South Africa) | 1993 | 9 June | 3 July | 2 | 1 | 1 | 0 | 6 | 3 | 1 | 2 | 8 | 4 | 2 | 2 | 50% | 169 | 159 | 10 |
| (South Africa) | 2001 | | | 2 | 1 | 0 | 1 | – | – | – | – | 2 | 1 | 0 | 1 | 50% | 48 | 43 | 5 |
| (South Africa) | 2005 | | | 2 | 0 | 1 | 1 | – | – | – | – | 2 | 0 | 1 | 1 | 0% | 43 | 57 | -14 |
| (South Africa) | 2006 | | | 1 | 1 | 0 | 0 | – | – | – | – | 1 | 1 | 0 | 0 | 100% | 36 | 26 | 10 |
| (South Africa) | 2010 | | | 1 | 0 | 0 | 1 | – | – | – | – | 1 | 0 | 0 | 1 | 0% | 17 | 42 | -25 |

=== New Zealand ===
| Flag | Year | From | To | Test Matches | | | | Tour Matches | | | | Total Record | | | | | | | |
| Flag | Year | From | To | P | W | D | L | P | W | D | L | P | W | D | L | % | PF | PA | PD |
|---|---|---|---|---|---|---|---|---|---|---|---|---|---|---|---|---|---|---|---|
| (Argentina) | 1949 tour | | | 2 | 2 | 0 | 0 | | | | | | | | | | | | |
| (Argentina) (Chile) | 1954 tour | | | 2 | 2 | 0 | 0 | | | | | | | | | | | | |
| (Argentina) (Uruguay) | 1960 tour | | | 3 | 3 | 0 | 0 | | | | | | | | | | | | |
| (New Zealand) (Australia) | 1961 tour | | | 4 | 1 | 0 | 3 | | | | | | | | | | | | |
| (New Zealand) (Australia) | 1968 tour | | | 4 | 0 | 0 | 4 | | | | | | | | | | | | |
| (Australia) | 1972 tour | 28 May | 25 June | 2 | 1 | 1 | 0 | 7 | 7 | 0 | 0 | 9 | 8 | 1 | 0 | 88.89% | 254 | 122 | 132 |
| (Brazil) (Argentina) | 1974 tour | | | 2 | 2 | 0 | 0 | | | | | | | | | | | | |
| (Argentina) | 1977 tour | | | 2 | 1 | 1 | 0 | | | | | | | | | | | | |
| (Fiji) (New Zealand) | 1979 tour | | | 2 | 1 | 0 | 1 | | | | | | | | | | | | |
| (Australia) | 1981 tour | | | 2 | 0 | 0 | 2 | | | | | | | | | | | | |
| (New Zealand) | 1984 tour | | | 2 | 0 | 0 | 2 | | | | | | | | | | | | |
| (Brazil) (Argentina) (Uruguay) | 1985 tour | | | 2 | 1 | 0 | 1 | | | | | | | | | | | | |
| (Argentina) (Australia) (New Zealand) | 1986 tour | | | 4 | 1 | 0 | 3 | | | | | | | | | | | | |
| (Argentina) | 1988 tour | | | 2 | 1 | 0 | 1 | | | | | | | | | | | | |
| (New Zealand) | 1989 tour | | | 2 | 0 | 0 | 2 | | | | | | | | | | | | |
| (Australia) | 1990 tour | | | 3 | 1 | 0 | 2 | | | | | | | | | | | | |
| (United States) | 1991 tour | | | 2 | 2 | 0 | 0 | | | | | | | | | | | | |
| (Argentina) | 1992 tour | | | 2 | 2 | 0 | 0 | | | | | | | | | | | | |
| (Canada) (New Zealand) | 1994 tour | | | 3 | 2 | 0 | 1 | | | | | | | | | | | | |
| (Argentina) | 1996 tour | | | 2 | 2 | 0 | 0 | | | | | | | | | | | | |
| (Australia) | 1997 tour | | | 2 | 0 | 0 | 2 | | | | | | | | | | | | |
| (Argentina) (Fiji) | 1998 tour | | | 3 | 3 | 0 | 0 | | | | | | | | | | | | |
| (Samoa) (Tonga) (New Zealand) | 1999 tour | | | 3 | 1 | 0 | 2 | | | | | | | | | | | | |
| (South Africa) (New Zealand) | 2001 tour | | | 3 | 1 | 0 | 2 | | | | | | | | | | | | |
| (Argentina) (Australia) | 2002 tour | | | 3 | 0 | 0 | 3 | | | | | | | | | | | | |
| (Argentina) (New Zealand) | 2003 tour | | | 3 | 0 | 0 | 3 | | | | | | | | | | | | |
| (United States) (Canada) | 2004 tour | | | 2 | 2 | 0 | 0 | | | | | | | | | | | | |
| (South Africa) (Australia) | 2005 tour | | | 3 | 0 | 1 | 2 | | | | | 3 | 0 | 1 | 2 | 0% | 74 | 94 | -20 |
| (New Zealand) | 2007 tour | | | 2 | 0 | 0 | 2 | | | | | 2 | 0 | 0 | 2 | 0% | 21 | 103 | -82 |
| (New Zealand) (Australia) | 2009 tour | | | 3 | 1 | 0 | 2 | | | | | 3 | 1 | 0 | 2 | 33.33% | 43 | 58 | -15 |
| (New Zealand) | 2013 | | | | | | | | | | | | | | | % | | | |
| (Australia) | 2014 | | | | | | | | | | | | | | | % | | | |
| (South Africa) | 2017 | | | | | | | | | | | | | | | % | | | |
| (New Zealand) | 2018 | | | | | | | | | | | | | | | % | | | |

== Test Record ==
=== Argentina Series ===
Argentina Series
| Year | Test | Home team | Score | Away team | Venue | Series Outcome |
|---|---|---|---|---|---|---|
| 1949 | 1st | Argentina | 0 – 5 | France | Estadio G.E.B.A., Buenos Aires | Argentina 0–2 France |
| 1949 | 2nd | Argentina | 3 – 12 | France | Estadio G.E.B.A., Buenos Aires | Argentina 0–2 France |
| 1954 | 1st | Argentina | 8 – 22 | France | Ferrocarril Stadium, Buenos Aires | Argentina 0–2 France |
| 1954 | 2nd | Argentina | 3 – 30 | France | Ferrocarril Stadium, Buenos Aires | Argentina 0–2 France |
| 1960 | 1st | Argentina | 3 – 37 | France | Ferrocarril Stadium, Buenos Aires | Argentina 0–3 France |
| 1960 | 2nd | Argentina | 3 – 12 | France | Ferrocarril Stadium, Buenos Aires | Argentina 0–3 France |
| 1960 | 3rd | Argentina | 6 – 29 | France | Ferrocarril Stadium, Buenos Aires | Argentina 0–3 France |
| 1974 | 1st | Argentina | 15 – 20 | France | Ferrocarril Stadium, Buenos Aires | Argentina 0–2 France |
| 1974 | 2nd | Argentina | 27 – 31 | France | Ferrocarril Stadium, Buenos Aires | Argentina 0–2 France |
| 1977 | 1st | Argentina | 3 – 26 | France | Ferrocarril Stadium, Buenos Aires | Argentina 0–1 France (1 Draw) |
| 1977 | 2nd | Argentina | 18 – 18 | France | Ferrocarril Stadium, Buenos Aires | Argentina 0–1 France (1 Draw) |
| 1985 | 1st | Argentina | 24 – 16 | France | Ferrocarril Stadium, Buenos Aires | Argentina 1–1 France; France shared 39–39 on points |
| 1985 | 2nd | Argentina | 15 – 23 | France | Ferrocarril Stadium, Buenos Aires | Argentina 1–1 France; France shared 39–39 on points |
| 1986 | 1st | Argentina | 15 – 13 | France | José Amalfitani Stadium, Buenos Aires | Argentina 1–1 France; France won 35–24 on points |
| 1986 | 2nd | Argentina | 9 – 22 | France | José Amalfitani Stadium, Buenos Aires | Argentina 1–1 France; France won 35–24 on points |
| 1988 | 1st | Argentina | 15 – 18 | France | José Amalfitani Stadium, Buenos Aires | Argentina 1–1 France; France lost 24–33 on points |
| 1988 | 2nd | Argentina | 18 – 6 | France | José Amalfitani Stadium, Buenos Aires | Argentina 1–1 France; France lost 24–33 on points |
| 1992 | 1st | Argentina | 12 – 27 | France | José Amalfitani Stadium, Buenos Aires | Argentina 0–2 France |
| 1992 | 2nd | Argentina | 9 – 33 | France | José Amalfitani Stadium, Buenos Aires | Argentina 0–2 France |
| 1996 | 1st | Argentina | 27 – 34 | France | Ferrocarril Stadium, Buenos Aires | Argentina 0–2 France |
| 1996 | 2nd | Argentina | 15 – 34 | France | Ferrocarril Stadium, Buenos Aires | Argentina 0–2 France |
| 1998 | 1st | Argentina | 18 – 35 | France | José Amalfitani Stadium, Buenos Aires | Argentina 0–2 France |
| 1998 | 2nd | Argentina | 12 – 37 | France | José Amalfitani Stadium, Buenos Aires | Argentina 0–2 France |
| 2003 | 1st | Argentina | 10 – 6 | France | José Amalfitani Stadium, Buenos Aires | Argentina 2–0 France |
| 2003 | 2nd | Argentina | 33 – 32 | France | José Amalfitani Stadium, Buenos Aires | Argentina 2–0 France |
| 2012 | 1st | Argentina | 23 – 20 | France | Estadio Mario Alberto Kempes, Córdoba | Argentina 1–1 France; France won 69–33 on points |
| 2012 | 2nd | Argentina | 10 – 49 | France | Estadio Monumental José Fierro, Tucumán | Argentina 1–1 France; France won 69–33 on points |

=== Australia Series ===
Australia Series
| Year | Test | Home team | Score | Away team | Venue | Series Outcome |
|---|---|---|---|---|---|---|
| 1972 | 1st | Australia | 14 – 14 | France | Sydney Cricket Ground, Sydney | Australia 0–1 France |
| 1972 | 2nd | Australia | 15 – 16 | France | Ballymore, Brisbane | Australia 0–1 France |
| 1981 | 1st | Australia | 17 – 15 | France | Ballymore, Brisbane | Australia 2–0 France |
| 1981 | 2nd | Australia | 24 – 14 | France | Sydney Cricket Ground, Sydney | Australia 2–0 France |
| 1990 | 1st | Australia | 21 – 9 | France | Aussie Stadium, Sydney | Australia 2–1 France |
| 1990 | 2nd | Australia | 48 – 31 | France | Ballymore, Brisbane | Australia 2–1 France |
| 1990 | 3rd | Australia | 19 – 28 | France | Aussie Stadium, Sydney | Australia 2–1 France |
| 1997 | 1st | Australia | 29 – 15 | France | Aussie Stadium, Sydney | Australia 2–0 France |
| 1997 | 2nd | Australia | 26 – 19 | France | Ballymore, Brisbane | Australia 2–0 France |
| 2002 | 1st | Australia | 29 – 17 | France | Telstra Dome, Melbourne | Australia 2–0 France |
| 2002 | 2nd | Australia | 31 – 25 | France | Telstra Stadium, Sydney | Australia 2–0 France |
| 2008 | 1st | Australia | 43 – 13 | France | ANZ Stadium, Sydney | Australia 2–0 France |
| 2008 | 2nd | Australia | 40 – 10 | France | Suncorp Stadium, Brisbane | Australia 2–0 France |
| 2014 | 1st | Australia | 50 – 23 | France | Suncorp Stadium, Brisbane | Australia 3–0 France |
| 2014 | 2nd | Australia | 6 – 0 | France | Etihad Stadium, Melbourne | Australia 3–0 France |
| 2014 | 3rd | Australia | 39 – 13 | France | Allianz Stadium, Sydney | Australia 3–0 France |

=== New Zealand Series ===
New Zealand Series
| Year | Test | Home team | Score | Away team | Venue | Series Outcome |
|---|---|---|---|---|---|---|
| 1961 | 1st | New Zealand | 13 – 6 | France | Eden Park, Auckland | New Zealand 3–0 France |
| 1961 | 2nd | New Zealand | 5 – 3 | France | Athletic Park, Wellington | New Zealand 3–0 France |
| 1961 | 3rd | New Zealand | 32 – 3 | France | Lancaster Park, Christchurch | New Zealand 3–0 France |
| 1968 | 1st | New Zealand | 12 – 9 | France | Lancaster Park, Christchurch | New Zealand 3–0 France |
| 1968 | 2nd | New Zealand | 9 – 3 | France | Athletic Park, Wellington | New Zealand 3–0 France |
| 1968 | 3rd | New Zealand | 19 – 12 | France | Eden Park, Auckland | New Zealand 3–0 France |
| 1979 | 1st | New Zealand | 23 – 9 | France | Lancaster Park, Christchurch | New Zealand 1–1 France; France lost 33–42 on points |
| 1979 | 2nd | New Zealand | 19 – 24 | France | Eden Park, Auckland | New Zealand 1–1 France; France lost 33–42 on points |
| 1984 | 1st | New Zealand | 10 – 9 | France | Lancaster Park, Christchurch | New Zealand 2–0 France |
| 1984 | 2nd | New Zealand | 31 – 18 | France | Eden Park, Auckland | New Zealand 2–0 France |
| 1989 | 1st | New Zealand | 25 – 17 | France | Lancaster Park, Christchurch | New Zealand 2–0 France |
| 1989 | 2nd | New Zealand | 34 – 20 | France | Eden Park, Auckland | New Zealand 2–0 France |
| 1994 | 1st | New Zealand | 8 – 22 | France | Lancaster Park, Christchurch | New Zealand 0–2 France |
| 1994 | 2nd | New Zealand | 20 – 23 | France | Eden Park, Auckland | New Zealand 0–2 France |
| 2007 | 1st | New Zealand | 42 – 11 | France | Eden Park, Auckland | New Zealand 2–0 France |
| 2007 | 2nd | New Zealand | 61 – 10 | France | Westpac Stadium, Wellington | New Zealand 2–0 France |
| 2009 | 1st | New Zealand | 22 – 27 | France | Carisbrook, Dunedin | New Zealand 1–1 France; France won 37–36 on points |
| 2009 | 2nd | New Zealand | 14 – 10 | France | Westpac Stadium, Wellington | New Zealand 1–1 France; France won 37–36 on points |
| 2013 | 1st | New Zealand | 23 – 13 | France | Eden Park, Auckland | New Zealand 3–0 France |
| 2013 | 2nd | New Zealand | 30 – 0 | France | Rugby League Park, Christchurch | New Zealand 3–0 France |
| 2013 | 3rd | New Zealand | 24 – 9 | France | Yarrow Stadium, New Plymouth | New Zealand 3–0 France |

=== South Africa Series ===
South Africa Series
| Year | Test | Home team | Score | Away team | Venue | Series Outcome |
|---|---|---|---|---|---|---|
| 1958 | 1st | South Africa | 3 – 3 | France | Newlands, Cape Town | South Africa 0–1 France (1 Draw) |
| 1958 | 2nd | South Africa | 5 – 9 | France | Ellis Park, Johannesburg | South Africa 0–1 France (1 Draw) |
| 1967 | 1st | South Africa | 26 – 3 | France | Kings Park Stadium, Durban | South Africa 2–1 France (1 Draw) |
| 1967 | 2nd | South Africa | 16 – 3 | France | Free State Stadium, Bloemfontein | South Africa 2–1 France (1 Draw) |
| 1967 | 3rd | South Africa | 14 – 19 | France | Ellis Park, Johannesburg | South Africa 2–1 France (1 Draw) |
| 1967 | 4th | South Africa | 6 – 6 | France | Newlands, Cape Town | South Africa 2–1 France (1 Draw) |
| 1971 | 1st | South Africa | 22 – 9 | France | Free State Stadium, Bloemfontein | South Africa 1–0 France (1 Draw) |
| 1971 | 2nd | South Africa | 8 – 8 | France | Kings Park Stadium, Durban | South Africa 1–0 France (1 Draw) |
| 1975 | 1st | South Africa | 38 – 25 | France | Free State Stadium, Bloemfontein | South Africa 2–0 France |
| 1975 | 2nd | South Africa | 33 – 18 | France | Loftus Versfeld, Pretoria | South Africa 2–0 France |
| 1993 | 1st | South Africa | 20 – 20 | France | Kings Park Stadium, Durban | South Africa 0–1 France (1 Draw) |
| 1993 | 2nd | South Africa | 17 – 18 | France | Ellis Park, Johannesburg | South Africa 0–1 France (1 Draw) |
| 2001 | 1st | South Africa | 23 – 33 | France | Ellis Park, Johannesburg | South Africa 1–1 France; France won 48–43 on points |
| 2001 | 2nd | South Africa | 20 – 15 | France | Kings Park Stadium, Durban | South Africa 1–1 France; France won 48–43 on points |
| 2005 | 1st | South Africa | 30 – 30 | France | Kings Park Stadium, Durban | South Africa 1–0 France (1 Draw) |
| 2005 | 2nd | South Africa | 27 – 13 | France | Boet Erasmus Stadium, Port Elizabeth | South Africa 1–0 France (1 Draw) |

=== One-off Tests in Argentina, Australia, New Zealand and South Africa ===
| Year | Home team | Score | Away team | Venue |
|---|---|---|---|---|
| 1961 | Australia | 8 – 15 | France | Sydney Cricket Ground, Sydney |
| 1964 | South Africa | 6 – 8 | France | PAM Brink Stadium, Springs |
| 1968 | Australia | 11 – 10 | France | Sydney Cricket Ground, Sydney |
| 1980 | South Africa | 37 – 15 | France | Loftus Versfeld, Pretoria |
| 1986 | Australia | 27 – 14 | France | Sydney Cricket Ground, Sydney |
| 1986 | New Zealand | 18 – 9 | France | Lancaster Park, Christchurch |
| 1999 | New Zealand | 54 – 7 | France | Athletic Park, Wellington |
| 2001 | New Zealand | 37 – 12 | France | WestpacTrust Stadium, Wellington |
| 2002 | Argentina | 28 – 27 | France | José Amalfitani Stadium, Buenos Aires |
| 2003 | New Zealand | 31 – 23 | France | Jade Stadium, Christchurch |
| 2005 | Australia | 31 – 23 | France | Suncorp Stadium, Brisbane |
| 2006 | South Africa | 26 – 36 | France | Newlands, Cape Town |
| 2009 | Australia | 22 – 6 | France | ANZ Stadium, Sydney |
| 2010 | South Africa | 42 – 17 | France | Newlands, Cape Town |
| 2010 | Argentina | 41 – 13 | France | José Amalfitani Stadium, Buenos Aires |

1995 ARG 12-47 FRA Ferrocaril Oeste, Buenos Aires

=== Others ===
France's score is first.
