= History of rugby union matches between Argentina and France =

France's national rugby union team first played Argentina in 1949 when they undertook a two-test tour of the latter country. France won both matches. Argentina did not manage a win over France until their 16th meeting in 1985, under the captaincy of Hugo Porta.

France has been Argentina's most frequent Test match opponent. France played a significant role in the early development of Argentine rugby in which the two countries played each other 13 times between 1949 and 1977. In total, the two countries have met fifty-six times, with France having won in forty encounters to Argentina's fifteen.

The teams have played each other four times at Rugby World Cup tournaments: In 1999 France won a quarter-final, and in 2007 Argentina beat France 17–12 in the tournament-opening pool game and again 34–10 in the playoff for third and fourth place after Argentina had lost to tournament winners South Africa in the semi-final. Even though Argentina had shown strong form in the year leading up to the tournament (winning 10 of 13 Test matches plus a one-point loss to France), the opening-game win was regarded as an upset by the media. They then played each other during the 2019, with this time France winning 23–21.

Though about two-thirds of the games have been played on Argentina's soil, France has won more than two-thirds of them. France won the only two matches the two have played on neutral ground.

The biggest difference in points was achieved by France during the second game of their 2012 tour to Argentina, winning 49–10.

Since 2000, the series has been especially closely fought between the two teams. In the 22 matches played in that time frame, France and Argentina are level at 11 wins apiece, with ten of the matches decided by a converted try (7 points) or less.

When the IRB introduced their world team rankings system in 2003, Argentina was ranked seventh and France fifth. Since then the ranking changed frequently and the two teams' order was reversed many times like in March 2009, when Argentina climbed to fourth place and France fell to seventh. Most recently, following Argentina's win in the first of their two-Test series in June 2012, the two teams switched places in the rankings with the Pumas in sixth and France in seventh but after their second game a week later, which saw France won by 39 points, France climbed back to the 5th place and Argentina drop to eighth. Since then, France has reached first place in the world in July 2022.

== Summary ==
=== Overview ===
Details	Played	Won by Argentina	Won by France	Drawn	Argentina points	France points
In Argentina	34	10	23	1	511	833
In France	20	5	15	0	349	482
Neutral venue	2	0	2	0	47	70
Overall	56	15	40	1	907	1,385

=== Records ===
Note: Date shown in brackets indicates when the record was or last set.

Record	Argentina	France
Longest winning streak	4 (15 June 2002 – 25 November 2006)	12 (28 August 1949 – 2 July 1977)
Largest points for
Home	41 (26 June 2010)	39 (17 November 2012)
Away	34 (19 October 2007)	49 (23 June 2012)
Largest winning margin
Home	28 (26 June 2010)	23 (19 October 1975)
Away	24 (19 October 2007)	39 (23 June 2012)

== Results ==
No.	Date	Venue	Score	Winner	Competition
1	28 August 1949	Estadio GEBA, Buenos Aires	0–5	France	1949 France tour
2	4 September 1949	Estadio GEBA, Buenos Aires	3–12	France	1949 France tour
3	29 August 1954	Estadio GEBA, Buenos Aires	8–22	France	1954 France tour
4	12 September 1954	Estadio GEBA, Buenos Aires	3–30	France	1954 France tour
5	23 July 1960	Estadio GEBA, Buenos Aires	3–37	France	1960 France tour
6	6 August 1960	Estadio GEBA, Buenos Aires	3–12	France	1960 France tour
7	17 August 1960	Estadio GEBA, Buenos Aires	6–29	France	1960 France tour
8	20 June 1974	Estadio Ferro Carril Oeste, Buenos Aires	15–20	France	1974 France tour
9	29 June 1974	Estadio Ferro Carril Oeste, Buenos Aires	27–31	France	1974 France tour
10	19 October 1975	Stade de Gerland, Lyon	29–6	France	1975 Argentina tour
11	25 October 1975	Parc des Princes, Paris	36–21	France	1975 Argentina tour
12	25 June 1977	Estadio Ferro Carril Oeste, Buenos Aires	3–26	France	1977 France tour
13	2 July 1977	Estadio Ferro Carril Oeste, Buenos Aires	18–18	draw	1977 France tour
14	14 November 1982	Stadium Municipal, Toulouse	25–12	France	1982 Argentina tour
15	20 November 1982	Parc des Princes, Paris	13–6	France	1982 Argentina tour
16	22 June 1985	Estadio Ferro Carril Oeste, Buenos Aires	24–16	Argentina	1985 France tour
17	29 June 1985	Estadio Ferro Carril Oeste, Buenos Aires	15–23	France	1985 France tour
18	31 May 1986	Estadio José Amalfitani, Buenos Aires	15–13	Argentina	1986 France tour
19	7 June 1986	Estadio José Amalfitani, Buenos Aires	9–22	France	1986 France tour
20	18 June 1988	Estadio José Amalfitani, Buenos Aires	15–18	France	1988 France tour
21	25 June 1988	Estadio José Amalfitani, Buenos Aires	18–6	Argentina	1988 France tour
22	5 November 1988	Stade de la Beaujoire, Nantes	29–9	France	1988 Argentina tour
23	11 November 1988	Stadium Lille-Metropole, Lille	28–18	France	1988 Argentina tour
24	4 July 1992	Estadio José Amalfitani, Buenos Aires	12–27	France	1992 France tour
25	11 July 1992	Estadio José Amalfitani, Buenos Aires	9–33	France	1992 France tour
26	14 November 1992	Stade de la Beaujoire, Nantes	20–24	Argentina	1992 Argentina tour
27	21 October 1995	Estadio Ferro Carril Oeste, Buenos Aires	12–47	France	1995 Latin Cup
28	22 June 1996	Estadio Ferro Carril Oeste, Buenos Aires	27–34	France	1996 France tour
29	29 June 1996	Estadio Ferro Carril Oeste, Buenos Aires	15–34	France	1996 France tour
30	26 October 1997	Stade Maurice Trélut, Tarbes	32–27	France	1997 Latin Cup
31	13 June 1998	Estadio José Amalfitani, Buenos Aires	18–35	France	1998 France tour
32	20 June 1998	Estadio José Amalfitani, Buenos Aires	12–37	France	1998 France tour
33	14 November 1998	Stade de la Beaujoire, Nantes	34–14	France	1998 Argentina tour
34	24 October 1999	Lansdowne Road, Dublin (Ireland)	26–47	France	1999 Rugby World Cup
35	15 June 2002	Estadio José Amalfitani, Buenos Aires	28–27	Argentina	2002 France tour
36	14 June 2003	Estadio José Amalfitani, Buenos Aires	10–6	Argentina	2003 France tour
37	20 June 2003	Estadio José Amalfitani, Buenos Aires	33–32	Argentina	2003 France tour
38	20 November 2004	Stade Vélodrome, Marseille	14–24	Argentina	2004 Autumn International
39	25 November 2006	Stade de France, Saint-Denis	27–26	France	2006 Autumn International
40	7 September 2007	Stade de France, Saint-Denis	12–17	Argentina	2007 Rugby World Cup^{(PS)}
41	19 October 2007	Parc des Princes, Paris	10–34	Argentina	2007 Rugby World Cup^{(3rd)}
42	8 November 2008	Stade Vélodrome, Marseille	12–6	France	2008 Autumn International
43	26 June 2010	José Amalfitani, Buenos Aires	41–13	Argentina	2010 Summer International
44	20 November 2010	Stade de la Mosson, Montpellier	15–9	France	2010 Autumn International
45	16 June 2012	Estadio Mario Kempes, Córdoba	23–20	Argentina	2012 France tour
46	23 June 2012	Estadio Monumental José Fierro, Tucumán	10–49	France	2012 France tour
47	17 November 2012	Grand Stade Lille Métropole, Lille	39–22	France	2012 Autumn International
48	22 November 2014	Stade de France, Saint-Denis	13–18	Argentina	2014 Autumn International
49	19 June 2016	Estadio Monumental José Fierro, Tucumán	30–19	Argentina	2016 France tour
50	25 June 2016	Estadio Monumental José Fierro, Tucumán	0–27	France	2016 France tour
51	17 November 2018	Stade Pierre-Mauroy, Lille	28–13	France	2018 Autumn International
52	21 September 2019	Tokyo Stadium, Chōfu (Japan)	23–21	France	2019 Rugby World Cup
53	5 November 2021	Stade de France, Saint-Denis	29–20	France	2021 Autumn International
54	6 July 2024	Estadio Malvinas Argentinas, Mendoza	13–28	France	2024 France tour
55	13 July 2024	Estadio José Amalfitani, Buenos Aires	33–25	Argentina	2024 France tour
56	22 November 2024	Stade de France, Saint-Denis	37–23	France	2024 Autumn International

== List of series ==
Played	Won by Argentina	Won by France	Drawn
18	1	11	6

Year	Argentina	Australia	Series winner
1949	0	2	France
1954	0	2	France
1960	0	3	France
1974	0	2	France
1975	0	2	France
1977	0	1	France (Note: France won the series 1–0, the second test resulting in a draw.)
1982	0	2	France
1985	1	1	Draw
1986	1	1	Draw
1988	1	1	Draw
1988	0	2	France
1992	0	2	France
1996	0	2	France
1998	0	2	France
2003	2	0	Argentina
2012	1	1	Draw
2016	1	1	Draw
2024	1	1	Draw
