= 1974 Five Nations Championship squads =

Rugby union competition squads

These are the 1974 Five Nations Championship squads:

== England ==
Head coach: John Elders

1. Mike Burton
2. Fran Cotton
3. Peter Dixon
4. David Duckham
5. Geoff Evans
6. Dusty Hare
7. Nigel Horton
8. Tony Jorden
9. Tony Neary
10. Alan Old
11. John Pullin (c.)
12. Chris Ralston
13. Andy Ripley
14. Peter Rossborough
15. David Roughley
16. Peter Squires
17. Keith Smith
18. Steve Smith
19. Stack Stevens
20. Roger Uttley
21. Jan Webster

== France ==
Head coach: Jean Desclaux

1. Jean-Michel Aguirre
2. Jean-Louis Azarete
3. Max Barrau (c.)*
4. René Benesis
5. Jean-Louis Bérot
6. Roland Bertranne
7. Victor Boffelli
8. Elie Cester (c.)
9. Claude Dourthe
10. Michel Droitecourt
11. André Dubertrand
12. Alain Esteve
13. Jacques Fouroux
14. Jean-François Gourdon
15. Jean Iraçabal
16. Daniel Kaczorowski
17. Jean-Pierre Lux
18. Joël Pécune
19. Jean-Pierre Romeu
20. Olivier Saïsset
21. Jean-Claude Skrela
22. Claude Spanghero
23. Armand Vaquerin
- captain in the first game

== Ireland ==
Head coach: Syd Millar

1. Patrick Agnew
2. Vinny Becker
3. Shay Deering
4. Tony Ensor
5. Mike Gibson
6. Tom Grace
7. Moss Keane
8. Ken Kennedy
9. Patrick Lavery
10. Sean Lynch
11. Willie John McBride (c.)
12. Stewart McKinney
13. Ray McLoughlin
14. Wallace McMaster
15. Richard Milliken
16. John Moloney
17. Terry Moore
18. Michael Quinn
19. Fergus Slattery

== Scotland ==
Head coach: Bill Dickinson

1. Ian Barnes
2. Gordon Brown
3. Sandy Carmichael
4. Lewis Dick
5. Drew Gill
6. Michael Hunter
7. Andy Irvine
8. Alan Lawson
9. Wilson Lauder
10. Nairn MacEwan
11. Duncan Madsen
12. Ian McGeechan
13. Alastair McHarg
14. Ian McLauchlan (c.)
15. Dougie Morgan
16. Jim Renwick
17. Colin Telfer
18. Bill Watson

== Wales ==
Head coach: Clive Rowlands

1. Phil Bennett
2. Roy Bergiers
3. Roger Blyth
4. Terry Cobner
5. Gerald Davies
6. Mervyn Davies
7. Gareth Edwards (c.)
8. Alex Finlayson
9. Ian Hall
10. Keith Hughes
11. Phil Llewellyn
12. Allan Martin
13. Dai Morris
14. Derek Quinnell
15. Clive Rees
16. Ian Robinson
17. Glyn Shaw
18. Delme Thomas
19. Geoff Wheel
20. J. J. Williams
21. J. P. R. Williams
22. Walter Williams
23. Bobby Windsor
