= 1975 Argentina rugby union tour of France =

Summary
P	W	D	L
Total
7	3	0	4
Test match
2	0	0	2
Opponent
P	W	D	L
France
2	0	0	2

The 1975 Argentina rugby union tour of France was a series of eight matches played by the Argentina national rugby union team in October.

It was the first tour of Argentinian team in France, and the second in Europe.

== Matches ==
Points scoring rules: try 4, conversion 2, penalty, drop and goal from a mark 3 points.

8 October 1975

Cote Basque	27 - 14	Argentina XV
Try: Serre 32' Petrissans 70' 74', Paparemborde 77'; Con: Vivies 32'; Pen: Lataste 36', Vivies 53' 57'		Try: Travaglini 2', Sansot 29', Morgan 80'; Con: Porta 29'

Stade J. Dauger, Bayonne
Referee: Alain Domercq.

Cote Basque: Lataste; Pécune, Etchenique, Ara, Serre; Vivies, Berrouet; Lassoujade, Bastiat (capt.), Petrissans; Haget e Imbemon (Lourdon); Azarete, Yachvili, Paparemborde.
Argentina: Martin Sansot; Daniel Beccar Varela, Alejandro Travaglini, Adolfo Rodríguez Jurado, Javier O'Farrell; Hugo Porta, Eduardo Morgan (capt); Ricardo Mastai, Hugo Migúens, Carlos Neyra; Carlos Bottarini, José Javier Fernández; Hugo Nicola, Guillermo Casas, Mario Carluccio.

12 October 1975

Second Division XV	3 - 10	Argentina XV
Pen: Barella 45'		Try: Travaglini 72'; Pen: Beccar Varela 16' 38'

Limoges

Second division XV: Daubinet; Xaussa, Cieply, Delaigue, Lazartigue; Morot, Barella; Rabatel, Mahe, Rame; Vidal, Jedreziak; Leconte, Lard, Salas.
Argentina: Eduardo García Terán; Javier O'Farrell, Raúl L'Erario, Alejandro Travaglini, Jorge Gauweloose; Gonzalo Beccar Varela, Ricardo Rinaldi; Carlos Neyra, Carlos Bori, Jorge Carracedo; Juan Antonio Mangiamelli, Carlos Bottarini; Oscar Carbone, Mariano Correa, Alejandro Cerioni

15 October 1975

Languedoc	3 - 9	Argentina XV
Pen: Benacloi 34'		Try: D.Beccar Varela 30'; Con: Porta 30'; Pen: Porta 4'

Carcassonne

Languedoc: Benacloi; Harize, Billoc, Badin, Bourkels; Perteil, Barrau; Boffelli, Viel, Verdoulet; Sappa-, Senal; Ducloup, Salette, Chaiivet.
Argentina: Martin Sansot; Daniel Beccar Varela, Arturo Rodríguez Jurado, Adolfo Cappelletti, Jorge Gauweloose; Hugo Porta, Eduardo Morgan (c); Carlos Neyra, Hugo Miguens, Ricardo Mastai; Carlos Bottarini, José Fernández; Hugo Nicola, Mariano Correa, Mario Carluccio.

19 October 1975

France	29 - 6	Argentina
Try: Pécune 16', 46' Skrela 22'; Gouroux 65', Rives 74' Droiecourt 80'; Con: Romeu 80'; Pen: Romeu 40'		Pen: Porta 1', 37'

Stade de Gerland, Lyon
Referee: DP d'Arcy (Ireland)

France			Argentina
Michel Droitecourt	FB	15	FB	Martin Sansot
Joël Pécune	W	14	W	Daniel Beccar Varela
Roland Bertranne	C	13	C	Arturo Rodriguez Jurado
Christian Badin	C	12	C	Alejandro Travaglini
André Dubertrand	W	11	W	Jorge Gauweloose
Jean-Pierre Romeu	FH	10	FH	Hugo Porta
(capt.) Jacques Fouroux	SH	9	SH	Eduardo Morgan (capt.)
Jean-Pierre Bastiat	N8	8	N8	Ricardo Mastai
Jean-Claude Skrela	F	7	F	Hugo Miguens
Jean-Pierre Rives	F	6	F	Carlos Neyra
Michel Palmie	L	5	L	Carlos Bottarini
Francis Haget	L	4	L	Jose Fernandez
Robert Paparemborde	P	3	P	Mario Carluccio
Alain Paco	H	2	H	Guillermo Casas
Gerard Cholley	P	1	P	Hugo Nicola

22 October 1975

Midi-Pyrénées	21 - 18	Argentina XV
Try: J.P. Aue 24', Massac 29'; Con: Laporte 24', 29'; Pen: Laporte 1', 37'; Drop: Sarnel 76'		Try: Beccar Varela 35'; Con: Beccar Varela 35'; Pen: Beccar Varela 11', 15, 50'; Drop: Beccar Varela 42'

Rodez

Midi-Pyrénées:: Sarnel; R. Aue, J.P. Aue, Cimarosti, Jacomet; Laporte, Tapie, Massac, Bariolet, Porcel; Saturnín, Junca; Revaillero, Besogne, Cuny.
Argentina: Eduardo García Terán; Jorge Gauweloose, Raúl L'Erario, Adolfo Cappelletti, Javier O'Farrell; Gonzalo Beccar Varela, Ricardo Rinaldi; Jorge Carracedo, Carlos Bori, Hugo Miguens; Carlos Bottarini, Juan Antonio Mangiamelfi; Oscar Carbone, Eduardo Vila, Alejandro Cerioni.

25 October 1975

France	36 - 21	Argentina
Try: Paparemborde 13', Skrela 22'; Briotecourt 33', Romeo 70', Astre 78'; Con: Romeu 13' ,78'; Pen: Romeu 3' 6',20',37'		Try: Gauweloose 58'; Con: Porta 58'; Pen: Sansot 24', Porta 28',25' ,40' 49'

Parc des Princes, Paris
Referee: Meirion Joseph (Wales)

France			Argentina
Michel Droitecourt	FB	15	FB	Martin Sansot
Joël Pécune	W	14	W	Daniel Beccar Varela
Roland Bertranne	C	13	C	Arturo Rodriguez Jurado
Jean-Martin Etchenique	C	12	C	Alejandro Travaglini
André Dubertrand	W	11	W	Jorge Gauweloose
Jean-Pierre Romeu	FH	10	FH	Hugo Porta
(capt.) Richard Astre	SH	9	SH	Eduardo Morgan (capt.)
Jean-Pierre Bastiat	N8	8	N8	Jorge Carracedo
Jean-Claude Skrela	F	7	F	Carlos Bori
Jean-Pierre Rives	F	6	F	Carlos Neyra
Michel Palmie	L	5	L	Carlos Bottarini
Francis Haget	L	4	L	Jose Fernandez
Robert Paparemborde	P	3	P	Alejandro Cerioni
Alain Paco	H	2	H	Guillermo Casas
Gerard Cholley	P	1	P	Hugo Nicola
		Replacements
			H	Eduardo Vila

29 October 1975

Bourges XV	16 - 17	Argentina XV
Try: Perez 25' 65'; Con: Pommier 65'; Pen: Pommier 9' 49'		Try: Gauweloose 58', Cappelletti 72'; Pen: Sansot 7', 25' 35'

Bourges

Bourges XV Pommier; Laberzri, Pérez, Laczack, Soula; Auriat, Monar; Kaczarowski, Dusang, Perón; Decrae, Genois; Dumusois, Garouste, Dalos.
Argentina: Martin Sansot; Jorge Gauweloose, Arturo Rodríguez Jurado, Adolfo Cappelletti, Javier O'Farrell; Hugo Porta, Morgan; Neyra, Hugo Miguens, Mario Carracedo; Carlos Bottarini, Fernández; Hugo Nicola, Eduardo Vila, Alejandro Cerioni

== Sources ==
- Vivian Jenkins, ed. (1979). Rothmans Rugby Yearbook 1979-80. Queen Anne Press. pp. 47–51. ISBN 0-354-09087-9.
- Union Argentina de Rugby (November 1975). "MEMORIA Temporada año 1975" (PDF) (in Spanish). Archived from the original (.doc) on 2013-09-04.
