= 1974 France rugby union tour of Brazil and Argentina =

Summary
P	W	D	L
Total
8	8	0	0
Test match
2	2	0	0
Opponent
P	W	D	L
Argentina
2	2	0	0
Brazil (Note: Not considered a test by the FFR.)
1	1	0	0

The 1974 France rugby union tour of Brazil and Argentina was a series of rugby union team matches played in June 1974 by the France national team in Argentina and Brazil.

== Touring party ==
- Manager: Laurent, Marcel
- Coach: Henry Fourès, Jean Desclaux

=== Forward ===
- Pierre Dospital, – Prop, Dax
- Jean Iraçabal – Prop, Bayonne
- Armand Vaquerin – Prop, Béziers
- Alain Paco, hooker Béziers
- Jean-Louis Ugartemendia, hooker(St. Jean de Luz)
- Georges Senal, lock Béziers
- Jean-Pierre Bastiat, lock, Béziers
- Alain Esteve, lock Béziers.
- Francis Haget, lock Agen
- Jean-Claude Rossignol, Prop, Brive
- Christian Paul, flanker, Tarbes.
- Victor Boffelli, flanker, Agen.
- Serge Lassoujade, flanker, Agen.
- Olivier Saïsset, flanker Béziers.
- Jean-Claude Skrela, flanker, Stade toulousain

=== Half ===
- Max Barrau, scrum half, Agen.
- Jacques Fouroux, scrum half, La Voulte
- Henri Cabrol, fly-half, Béziers.
- Jean-Pierre Romeu, fly-half, Montferrand

=== Three-quarters ===
- Roland Bertranne, Roland – center, Bagnères.
- Claude Dourthe center, Dax
- Jean-Martin Etchenique, center, Biarritz
- Jean-Pierre Lux – center/wing Dax, Dax
- Joël Pécune, center, Tarbes.
- Laurent Desnoyer, Laurent, wing, Brive
- Jean-François Gourdon, wing, Racing Club de France
- Jean-Michel Aguirre, full-back, Bagnères
- Michel Droitecourt, full-back, Montferrand

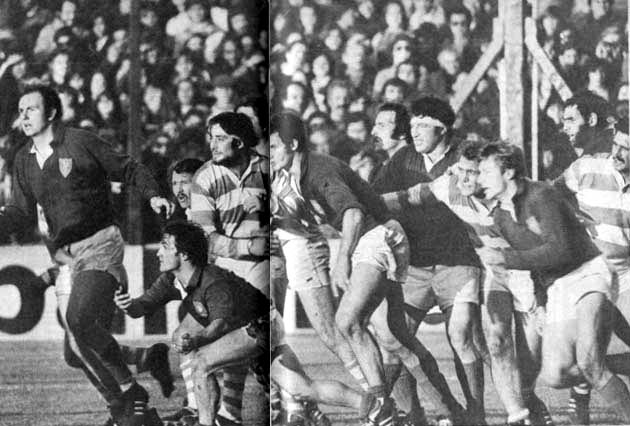
The first test v Argentina at Ferro C. Oeste

== Match details ==
Complete list of matches played in Argentina and Brazil:

- Points scoring rules: try 4 points, conversion 2 points, penalty goal, drop goal and goal from a mark 3 points

1 June 1974

Brazil	7–99	France
Try: Aguirre, Bertranne (3), Boffelli (2), Desnoyer (3), Gourdon (4), Iracabal, Lux (2), Skrela (2); Con: Romeu (12); Pen: Romeu

São Paulo A.C., São Paulo

France: 15.M.Droitecourt; 14.J.F. Gourdon, 13.R.Bertranne, 12.J.Lux, 11.L.Desnoyer; 10.J.Romeu, 9.M.Barrau (c); 7.J.Skrela, 8.O.Saisset, 6.V.Boffelli; 5.G.Senal, 4.F.Haget; 3.J.Iracabal, 2.J.Ugartemendia, 1.P.Hospital

8 June 1974

San Isidro Club	10–34	France
Try: scrum Pen: Cutler (2)	Report	Try: Gourdon (3), Senal, Paco; Boffelli, Vaquerin; Con: Cabrol (3)

Ferro Carril Oeste, Buenos Aires
Referee: Eduardo Niño

San Isidro Club: F. Insúa; O, Rocha, A. Orzábal; J. Rodríguez Jurado, A. Anthony; J. Carracedo, R. Lucke, M. Iglesias (capt.); M. Cutler, F. González Victorica; R. Morganti, R. Matarazzo (79' E.Martínez), M. Walther, J, Otaola; A. Rodríguez Jurado.
France: J. Irazabal, A. Paco, A. Vaquerin; J. Bastiat, G. Senal; V. Boffelli, C. Paul (J.Rossignol); O. Saisset (capt.); D. Fouroux, H. Cabrol; J. Pécune, R. Bertranne (C. Dourthe), J. Lux, J. Gourdon; J. Aguirre.

12 June 1974

Cuyo RU	4–59	France
Try: Fariello		Try: Pécune 3, Desnoyers 2, Cabrol 2 Aguirre, Haget, Dourthe; Con: Romeu 5 Pen: Romeu 2 Drop: Romeu

Mendoza RC Stadium, Mendoza
Referee: César de Elizalde

Cuyo: J. González, J. Crivelli, R. Fariello; A. Cat¬taneo, R. Irañeta (capt.); J. Ragazzone, J. Nasazzi, J. Navesi; L. Chacón, P. Guarrochena; M. Brandi, O. Terranova, D. Muñiz, C. Dora; J. Castro.
France:; A. Vaquerin, A. Paco, P. Dospital; J. Rossignol, F. Haget; S. Lassoujade, J. Bastiat, J. Skrela; R. Astre, J. Romeu; J. Pécune (H. Cabrol), C. Dourthe (capt.), J. Etchenique, L. Desnoyers; J. Aguirre.

16 June 1974

Buenos Aires RU	9–31	France
Pen: Cutler, González Victorica, Harris Smith		Try: Desnoyers (2), Boffelli, Cabrol, Etchenique, Vaquerin; Con: Cabrol (2); Pen: Cabrol

Ferro Carril Oeste, Buenos Aires
Referee: Armando Zungri (Argentina)

Buenos Aires: M.Carluccio, F.Lafuente, O'.Carbone; C, Bottarini (R.García Fernández), J.Rodríguez jurado; J.Carracedo, R.Lucke, N. Carbone (capt.) (O.Rocha); M.Cutler, F.González Victorica; F.Villamil, E.Morgan, A.Cappelletti, R.Benyon; T. Harris Smith,
France: A.Vaquerin, J.Ugartemendía, P.Dospital; J.Senal, F, Haget; S.Lassoujade, J.Rossignol, V.Boffelli; M. Barrau (capt.), H.Cabrol; R.Bertranne, C.Dourthe, J.Etchenique, L.Desnoyers; M.Droitecourt.

=== First test ===
20 June 1974

Argentina	15–20	France
Try: Rodríguez Jurado; Con: Porta; Pen: Porta (3)	Report	Try: Bertranne, Dourthe, Foroux; Con: Romeu; Pen: Romeu (2)

Ferro Carril Oeste, Buenos Aires
Attendance: 37,000
Referee: Ron Lewis (Wales)

Team details

Argentina	France

Arturo Rodríguez Jurado	FB	15	FB	Michel Droitecourt
Mario Walther	W	14	W	Jean-Francois Gourdon
Alejandro Travaglini	C	13	C	Claude Dourthe (capt.)
Roberto Matarazzo	C	12	C	Jean-Pierre Lux
Julio Otaola	W	11	W	Roland Bertranne
Hugo Porta	FH	10	FH	Jean-Pierre Romeu
Adolfo Etchegaray	SH	9	SH	Jacques Fouroux
Miguel Iglesias (capt.)	F	7	F	Victor Boffelli
Raul Sanz	F	8	F	Jean-Pierre Bastiat
Jose Fernández	F	6	F	Jean-Claude Skrela
Adrian Anthony	L	5	L	Francis Haget
Rito Iraneta	L	4	L	Georges Senal
Arturo Orzabal	P	3	P	Jean Iracabal
Osvaldo Rocha	H	2	H	Alain Paco
Fernando Insúa	P	1	P	Armand Vaquerin

23 June 1974

Rosario RU	10–21	France
Try: Mainini, Chesta; Con: Rodríguez		Try: Aguirre, Gourdon; Desnoyers, Bertranne; Con: Romeu; Pen: Romeu

Ferrocarrill Oeste, Buenos Aires
Referee: Ricardo Colombo (Argentina)

Rosario: S.Furno, J.Costante, E.Pavani; J.Mangiamelli, J.Giannone; E.Mainini, M. Cuesta (capt.), V.Macat; R.Castagna, J.Escalante; G.Blanco, R. del Villar, C. Blanco Ansaldi, H.Radiculé; A.Rodríguez.
France: J.Iracabal, J.Ugartemendía, P, Dospital; J.Bastiat, F.Haget; O.Saisset, C.Paul, S.Lassoujade; M. Barrau (cap.), J.Romeu; L.Desnoyers, J, Etchenique, R.Bertranne, J.Gourdon; J.Aguirre.

26 June 1974

Seleccionado del Interior	12–61	France
Try: Muñiz; Con: Viders; Pen: Escalante (2)		Try: Gourdon (4), Lassoujade (4); Saisset, Vaquerin; Con: Cabrol 9 Pen: Cabrol

Lawn Tennis Club Stadium, Tucumán
Referee: Florencio Varela (Argentina)

Interior: J. Pavani (J.Viders), J.Costante, S.Fumo; J.Mangiamelli, R.Passaglia; J.Nasazzi, M. Chesta (capt.) (E.Mainini), J.Navesi; R. Castagna (64' G.Bergallo) J.Escalante; R.Tarquini, O.Terranova, L.Muñiz, C, Dora; L.Chacón
France: P. Dospital, J. Ugartemendía, A. Vaquerin; J. Rossignol, G. Sena; S. Lassoujade, C. Paul, O. Saisset (capt.); R. Astre, J. Cabrol; L. Desnoyers, J. Etchenique, J. Lux, J. Gourdon; M.Droitecourt.

=== Second test ===
29 June 1974

Argentina	27–31	France
Try: Walther; Con: Porta; Pen: Porta (7)	Report	Try: Bertranne, Dourthe, Gourdon (2); Con: Romeu (3); Pen: Romeu (3)

Ferro Carril Oeste, Buenos Aires
Attendance: 25,000
Referee: Ron Lewis (Wales)

Team details

Argentina	France

Arturo Rodríguez Jurado	FB	15	FB	Jean-Michel Aguirre
Mario Walther	W	14	W	Jean-Francois Gourdon
Alejandro Travaglini	C	13	C	Claude Dourthe
Roberto Matarazzo	C	12	C	Jean-Pierre Lux
Julio Otaola	W	11	W	Roland Bertranne
Hugo Porta	FH	10	FH	Jean-Pierre Romeu
Adolfo Etchegaray	SH	9	SH	Jacques Fouroux
Miguel Iglesias (capt.)	F	7	F	Victor Boffelli
Raúl Sanz	F	8	F	Jean-Pierre Bastiat
Jose Fernández	F	6	F	Olivier Saisset (capt.)
Adrian Anthony	L	5	L	Francis Haget
Carlos Bottarini	L	4	L	Georges Senal
Arturo Orzábal	P	3	P	Jean Iracabal
Osvaldo Rocha	H	2	H	Alain Paco
Fernando Insúa	P	1	P	Armand Vaquerin
