= 1975 France rugby union tour of South Africa =

Summary
P	W	D	L
Total
11	6	1	4
Test match
2	0	0	2
Opponent
P	W	D	L
South Africa
2	0	0	2

The 1975 France rugby union tour of South Africa was a series of matches played by the France national rugby union team in South Africa in May and June 1975. The French team played eleven matches, of which they won six, lost four and drew one. They lost the Test Series 2–0 to the Springboks.

== Results ==
Scores and results list France's points tally first.

	Date	Opponent	Location	Result	Score
Match 1	31 May	Natal	Durban	Won	34–18
Match 2	2 June	South African (African XV)	Mdantsane, East London	Won	39–9
Match 3	4 June	South African Coloured XV	Goodwood, Cape Town	Won	37–3
Match 4	7 June	South African Invitation XV	Cape Town	Lost	3–18
Match 5	9 June	South Western Districts	Oudtshoorn	Won	44–6
Match 6	11 June	Eastern Province	Port Elizabeth	Won	18–9
Match 7	14 June	Transvaal	Johannesburg	Lost	22–28
Match 8	17 June	South West Africa	South West Stadium, Windhoek	Draw	13–13
Match 9	21 June	SOUTH AFRICA	Free State Stadium, Bloemfontein	Lost	25–38
Match 10	24 June	North-East Cape	Aliwal North	Won	34–15
Match 11	28 June	SOUTH AFRICA	Loftus Versfeld, Pretoria	Lost	18–33

== Touring party ==
- Manager: M. Batigne
- Assistant Managers: Michel Celaya and Fernand Cazenave
- Joint Captains: Richard Astre and Jacques Fouroux

=== Full backs ===
Jean-Michel Aguirre, Michel Droitecourt, Jean-Pierre Pesteil

=== Three-quarters ===
Jean-Charles Amade, Jean-Luc Averous, Christian Badin, Roland Bertranne, Maurice Dupey, Jean-Martin Etchenique, Dominique Harize, Francois Sangali

=== Half-backs ===
Jacques Fouroux, Jean-Pierre Romeu Richard Astre

=== Forwards ===
Yves Brunet, Gerard Cholley, Jean Costantino, Jean-Pierre Decrae, Joel Forestlier, Alain Guilbert, Francis Haget, Jean-Luc Joinel, Michel Julian, Serge Lassoujade, Robert Paparemborde, Patrice Péron, Daniel Revailler, Marc Rousett, Jean-Claude Skrela, Michel Yachvili
