= 1977 France rugby union tour of Argentina =

- Date: Jun–Jul 1977
Summary
P	W	D	L
Total
6	5	1	0
Test match
2	1	1	0
Opponent
P	W	D	L
Argentina
2	1	1	0

The 1977 France rugby union tour of Argentina was a series of matches played between June and July 1977 in Argentina France national rugby union team

Two test matches were played, with a victory for France and a draw.

== Match details ==
11 June 1977

Buenos Aires	4–38	France
Try: Mac Call	Report	Try: Aguirre (2), Droitecourt, Averous, Mazas, Bertranne, Brunet; Con: Aguirre (5)

Ferro Carril Oeste, Buenos Aires
Referee: José M. Cabañas (Buenos Aires)

Team details

Buenos Aires: S. Gutiérrez O'Farrell; J. Piccardo, L. Balfour, J. Trucco, J. Mac Call; J. Capalbo, Ricardo Landajo (captain); C. Neyra, R. Lucke, D. Chimondeguy; Raúl Sanz, Alejandro Iachetti; R. Ventura, M. Correa, Ricardo Mastai
France: Jean-Michel Aguirre; Jean-Luc Averous, Jean-Michel Mazas, Roland Bertranne, Michel Droitecourt; Alain Caussade, Jacques Fouroux (captain); Jean-Pierre Rives, Roland Pétrissans, Jean-Claude Skrela; Jean-Francois Imbernon, Michel Sappa; Armand Vaquerin, Yves Brunet, Robert Paparemborde

15 June 1977

Interior	12–28	France
Pen: Guarrochena (4)		Try: Joinel, Petrissan, Paparemborde; Con: Romeu (2); Pen: Romeu (3); Drop: Romeu

Jockey Club, Salta
Referee: Fernando Malmierca (Tucumán)

18 June 1977

Clubes	6–23	France
Try: Wust; Con: Lago		Try: Gallion, Noves, Rives, Averous; Con: Aguirre, Caussade; Pen: Aguirre

Ferro Carril Oeste, Buenos Aires
Referee: Angel Garrido (Buenos Aires)

22 June 1977

Cuyo	4–25	France
Try: Morales		Try: Aguirre (2), Guilbert, Swierczynski; Con: Romeu (3); Pen: Romeu

Marista RC, Mendoza
Referee: Bruno Bertelli (Buenos Aires)

25 June 1977

Argentina	3–26	France
Pen: Porta		Try: Bertranne, Bustaffa; Pen: Aguirre, Romeu (4); Drop: Romeu

Ferro Carril Oeste, Buenos Aires
Attendance: 20,000
Referee: Roger Quittenton (England)

Team details

Argentina			France
Martín Alonso	FB	15	FB	Jean-Michel Aguirre
Jorge Gauweloose	W	14	W	Daniel Bustaffa
Gonzalo Beccar Varela	C	13	C	Roland Bertranne
Daniel Beccar Varela	C	11	C	François Sangalli
Adolfo Cappelletti	W	12	W	Jean-Luc Averous
(capt.) Hugo Porta	FH	10	FH	Jean-Pierre Romeu
Ricardo Castagna	SH	9	SH	Jacques Fouroux (capt.)
Horacio Mazzini	N8	8	N8	Alain Guilbert
Jorge Carracedo	F	7	F	Jean-Claude Skrela
Ricardo Mastai	F	6	F	Jean-Pierre Rives
Eliseo Branca	L	5	L	Michel Palmié
José Javier Fernandez	L	4	L	Jean-Francois Imbernon
Mario Carluccio	P	3	P	Robert Paparemborde
Jorge Braceras	H	2	H	Yves Brunet
Fernando Insúa	P	1	P	Gérard Cholley
		Replacements
Fernando Bustillo	P	16

28 June 1977

Santa Fe	6–34	France
Pen: Quevedo (2)		Try: Bertranne (2), Bustaffa, Caussade, Swierczynski, Petrissans; Con: Droitecourt (2); Pen: Droitecourt; Drop: Caussade

Club Estudiantes, Paraná
Referee: Eduardo Niño (Buenos Aires)

2 July 1977

Argentina	18–18	France
Pen: Porta (6)		Pen: Aguirre (6)

Ferro Carril Oeste, Buenos Aires
Attendance: 20,000
Referee: Roger Quittenton (England)

Team details

Argentina			France
Martín Alonso	FB	15	FB	Jean-Michel Aguirre
Jorge Gauweloose	W	14	W	Daniel Bustaffa
Gonzalo Beccar Varela	C	13	C	Roland Bertranne
Daniel Beccar Varela	C	11	C	François Sangalli
Adolfo Cappelletti	W	12	W	Michel Droitecourt
(capt.) Hugo Porta	FH	10	FH	Jean-Pierre Romeu
Ricardo Landajo	SH	9	SH	Jacques Fouroux (capt.)
Horacio Mazzini	N8	8	N8	Alain Guilbert
Jorge Carracedo	F	7	F	Jean-Claude Skrela
Raúl Sanz	F	6	F	Jean-Pierre Rives
Eliseo Branca	L	5	L	Michel Palmié
José Javier Fernandez	L	4	L	Jean-Francois Imbernon
Mario Carluccio	P	3	P	Armand Vaquerin
José Costante	H	2	H	Christian Swierczinski
Fernando Insúa	P	1	P	Gérard Cholley
		Replacements
Fernando Bustillo	P	16
Ricardo Mastai	N8	17
