= 1982 Argentina rugby union tour of France and Spain =

- Tour captain: Hugo Porta
Summary
P	W	D	L
Total
8	4	0	4
Test match
3	1	0	2
Opponent
P	W	D	L
France
2	0	0	2
Spain
1	1	0	0

The 1982 Argentina rugby union tour of France and Spain was a series of eight matches played by the Argentina national rugby union team in October and November 1982.

== Matches ==
30 October 1982

Auvergne XV	15 - 38	Argentina XV
Try: Marocco; Con: Methles; Pen: Methles 3		Try: Palma 2, da Vedla 2 Campo, Travaglini, Madero; Con: Porta 2 Pen: Porta 2

Clermont-Ferrand
Referee: M. Chevrie (FFR)

Auvergne: E.Bonneval; L.Husson, T.Merlos, P, Rocacher, P.Bonal; P.Mathias, G.Ramon; M. Viatge P.Ruiz, J.P.Fauvel; J.J.Santos, D.Baby; Dales, Rizon: J. Brugiroux (P.Marocco),
Argentina: Enrique Sanguinetti; Marcelo Campo, Rafael Madero, Marcelo Loffreda, José Palma; Hugo Porta (capt.) Alfredo Soares Gache; Tomas Petersen, Ricardo de Vedla, Ernesto Ure; Alejandro lachetti, Gabriel Travaglini; Serafin Dengra, Andrés Courreges, Pablo Devoto.

3 November 1982

Drôme – Ardèche	25 - 15	Argentina XV
Try: Malease; D.Camberabero, Buchet; Con: Tourlonnias 2 Pen: Tourlonnias; Drop: D.Camberabero 2		Try: Porta 2 Con: Porta 2 Drop: Porta

Valence
Referee: M. Bressy (FFR)

Drome-Ardeche: Tourlonies; Anne, Mesny, Lacazak, Melonse; D.Camberabero, G.Camberabero; J.Rives (capt.), (M. Cecillon), Atcher, Buchet; A. Lorieux, Sales; Mareval, Fontbonne (Prox), Alabarbe.
Argentina: Enrique Sanguinetti; Marcelo Campo, Rafael Madero, Marcelo Loffreda, S.Varone; Alfredo Soares Gache, Hugo Porta (capt.); Tomas Petersen, Ernesto Ure, S.O' Connor: Alejandro Iachetti, Gabriel Travaglini; Fernando Morel, Andrés Courreges, Pablo Devoto.

6 November 1982

French Army	27 - 9	Argentina XV
Try: Roux, Salín; Tremouielle; Con: Lescure 3 Pen: Lescure 3		Try: Cappelletti; Con: Porta; Pen: Porta

Aurillac
Referee: M. Puget (FFR)

French Army P.Tremouille; J.Bonnet, Lame E.Silva, P.Belín; (Otazo), J.M.Lescure, M.Mondar; T.Janeczek, P.Roux, P.Dubois; G.Giraud, D.Defines; Lagrave, G.Tudela, Sauveterre.
Argentina: M. Campo J.Palma, R.Madero, M.Loffreda, O.Cappelleti; H.Porta, J.Miguens, M.M.Tezanos Pinto, R. De Vadia, S.O' Connor; G.Travaglini, G.Milano; S.Dengra, L. De Chazal, E. Rodriguez

11 November 1982

(France) French Barbarians	8 - 22	Argentina XV
Try: Lausaman, Begú		Try: Sanguinetti, Travaglini; Con: Porta; Pen: Porta 4

Dax
Referee: M. Mourette (FFR)

French Barbarians: M.Rase; Brunel, Merlos, Codorniou, Begú; Lescarboura, Vilquin; Lansaman, Nieucel, M.Mexted; Michel, Meleig; Stefanutti; Dupont, Dubroca.
Argentina: E.Sanguinetti; M.Campo, R.Madero, M.Loffreda, G..Verano; H. Porta (capt.), J.Miguens; R. De Vedia, T.Petersen, E.M.Ure; A.Iachetti, G.Travaglini; S.Dengre, A.Courreges, P.Devoto.

14 November 1982

France	25 - 12	Argentina
Try: Blanco; Esteve, Sella 2 Pen: Blanco, Camberabero; Drop: Camberabero		Try: Travaglini; Con: Porta; Pen: Porta 2

Toulouse
Attendance: 4.000
Referee: John West (IRFU)

France			Argentina
Serge Blanco	FB	15	FB	Eduardo Sanguinetti
Philippe Sella	W	14	W	Marcelo Campo
Patrick Mesny	C	13	C	Marcelo Loffreda
Pierre Chadebech	C	12	C	Rafael Madero
Patrick Esteve	W	11	W	Guillermo Varone
Didier Camberabero	FH	10	FH	Hugo Porta (capt.)
(capt.) Gerard Martinez	SH	9	SH	Javier Miguens
Dominique Erbani	N8	8	F	Gabriel Travaglini
Éric Buchet	F	7	F	Tomas Petersen
Thierry Janeczek	F	6	N8	Ernesto Ure
Jean-Charles Orso	L	5	L	Gustavo Milano
Daniel Revailler	L	4	L	Alejandro Iachetti
Robert Paparemborde	P	3	P	Pablo Devoto
Philippe Dintrans	H	2	H	Andres Courreges
Pierre Dospital	P	1	P	Fernando Morel

17 November 1982

Poitou-Charente	9 - 12	Argentina XV
Try: Lagisquet; Con: Mothe; Drop: Delega		Try: Travaglini; Con: Sanguinetti; Pen: Sanguinetti 2

Angoulême
Referee: Marc Seint Guilhhea (FFR)

Poitou-Charente Desiré; Andrleu, Barboteau, Mothe, Lagisquet; Ch.Delego, Serrado; Gratton, Atcher, Fauvel; Guilleton, Mialot; Garat Bortolucci, Alabarbe
Argentina: D.R.Baetti; J.Palma.M, Loffreda., M.Fijalkauskas, A.Cappellettl; G.Sanguinetti, J.Miguens; E.Ure, J. De Vedia, S.O' Connor: G.Travaglini, A.Iachetti; S.Dengra, L. De Chazal, E.Rodriguez.

20 November 1982

France	13 - 6	Argentina
Try: Begu, Blanco; Con: Camberabero; Pen: Camberabero		Pen: Porta 2

Parc des Princes, Paris
Attendance: 10.000
Referee: David Burnett (IRFU)

France			Argentina
Serge Blanco	FB	15	FB	Eduardo Sanguinetti
Philippe Sella	W	14	W	Marcelo Campo
Patrick Mesny	C	13	C	Marcelo Loffreda
Pierre Chadebech	C	12	C	Rafael Madero
Patrick Esteve	W	11	W	Jose Palma
Didier Camberabero	FH	10	FH	Hugo Porta (capt.)
(capt.) Gerard Martinez	SH	9	SH	Alfredo Soares Gache
Dominique Erbani	N8	8	N8	Ernesto Ure
Éric Buchet	F	7	F	Ricardo de Vedia
Thierry Janeczek	F	6	F	Gabriel Travaglini
Jean-Charles Orso	L	5	L	Gustavo Milano
Patrick Salas	L	4	L	Alejandro Iachetti
Robert Paparemborde	P	3	P	Pablo Devoto
Philippe Dintrans	H	2	H	Andres Courreges
Pierre Dospital	P	1	P	Serafin Dengra
		Replacements
(substituted on) Jacques Begu	W	16

23 November 1982

Spain	19 - 28	Argentina

Estadio Vallehermoso, Madrid
Attendance: 7.000
Referee: J.P. Bresay (F.F.R.)

Spain			Argentina
Gabriel Rivero	FB	15	FB	Eduardo Sanguinetti
José Tormo	W	14	W	Marcelo Campo
Fernando García de la Torre	C	13	C	Marcelo Loffreda
Manolo Moriche	C	12	C	Rafael Madero
Jon Azkargorta	W	11	W	José Palma
Luis Núñez Doval	FH	10	FH	Hugo Porta (capt.)
Carlos Encabo	SH	9	SH	Alfredo Soares Gache
Sergio Longhney	N8	8	F	Gabriel Travaglini
José Antonio Egido	F	7	N8	Ernesto Ure
Ramón Blanco Duelo	F	6	F	Ricardo de Vedia
Carlos García Alcázar	L	5	L	Gustavo Milano
Luis Armando Menéndez Menéndez	L	4	L	Alejandro Iachetti
Ramón Nuche	P	3	P	Pablo Devoto
Santiago Santos	H	2	H	Andres Courreges
Antonio Machuca	P	1	P	Serafin Dengra

== Sources ==
- Stephen Jones, ed. (1983). Rothmans Rugby Union Yearbook 1983-84. Queen Anne Press. ISBN 0-3560-9730-7.
- Union Argentina de Rugby (November 1982). "MEMORIA Temporada año 1982" (PDF) (in Spanish). Archived from the original (.doc) on 2012-11-01.
