= Skrela =

Surname

Skrela is a surname. Notable people with the surname include:

- David Skrela (born 1979), French rugby union footballer
- Gaëlle Skrela (born 1983), French basketball player
- Jean-Claude Skrela (born 1949), French rugby player and coach, father of David
