= Eric Melville =

France international rugby union player

- Born: 27 June 1961 Cape Town, South Africa
- Died: 19 June 2017 (aged 55) La Garde, Var, France
- Height: 6 ft 5 in (196 cm)
- Weight: 237 lb (108 kg)

Rugby union career
- Position: Flanker / No. 8
International career
Years	Team	Apps	(Points)
1990–91	France	6	(0)

Eric Melville (27 June 1961 — 19 June 2017) was a French rugby union international.

Melville, born and raised in Cape Town, moved to France in 1980 soon after finishing school. He spent his first six years of French rugby at Landes-based clubs Hagetmau and Stade Montois, then in 1986 began a successful period with RC Toulon, where he was a member of two top division championship-winning teams.

A giant back-row forward, Melville acquired French nationality and in 1990 became the first player of South African origin to be capped for the national team, debuting off the bench against Ireland in the 1990 Five Nations. He played all three Tests on the 1990 tour of Australia and later that year featured in a home Test against the All Blacks, before gaining his sixth and final cap in 1991 on a tour of the United States.

Melville served stints as head coach of French clubs FCS Rumilly, SO Ugine-Albertville, RO Grasse and Stade Dijonnais between 2003 and 2012. He coached Switzerland at the time of his death from a heart attack in 2017.

== See also ==
- List of France national rugby union players
