= Tour de France (disambiguation) =

The Tour de France is an annual multiple stage bicycle race primarily held in France.

Tour de France may also refer to:

== Sport ==
- Tour de France Femmes, women's road cycling multi-stage tour
- Tour de France à la voile, sailing
- Tour de France Automobile, rally

== Other uses ==
- Compagnons du Tour de France, French journeymen's fraternity of medieval origin
- Charles IX's grand tour of France, a royal tour by Charles IX of the Kingdom of France from 1564 to 1566
- Tour de France Soundtracks, a 2003 music album by Kraftwerk, remastered in 2009 and retitled Tour de France
- "Tour de France" (song), a 1983 and 1999 single also by Kraftwerk
- Tour de France (video game series) based on the cycle race
- Tour de France (film), a 2016 French film
- Tour de France (2011 video game)

== See also ==
- Tour France, a residential skyscraper in La Défense, west of Paris, France
- Tours, France, city in central France
- Le Tour de la France par deux enfants, 1877 didactic children's novel
- A Little Tour in France, 1884 book of travel writing by Henry James
- Le Tour de France 88, 1988 album by France Gall
- La Course by Le Tour de France, single stage classic, women's road cycling race
- France national rugby union team tours
