= Hervé Guiraud =

France international rugby union player

- Born: 25 November 1966 (age 59) Castelnaudary, France
- Height: 5 ft 9 in (175 cm)
- Weight: 198 lb (90 kg)

Rugby union career
- Position: Hooker
International career
Years	Team	Apps	(Points)
1996	France	1	(0)

Hervé Guiraud (born 25 November 1966) is a French former rugby union international.

Guiraud, born in Castelnaudary, came through the youth system of Rugby Olympique Castelnaudary. He played for RC Nîmes and RC Narbonne during his time in the top flight of French rugby.

Following an unsuccessful 1996 Five Nations campaign, Guiraud was one of several new players called up by France for a home Test against Romania at Aurillac, where he played as the hooker in a 52-point win. This remained his only cap, but he was also on the tour of Argentina with the national team later that year.

== See also ==
- List of France national rugby union players
