= Jean-Louis Ugartemendia =

France international rugby union player

- Born: 10 July 1943 Bayonne, France
- Died: 21 December 2020 (aged 77)
- Height: 5 ft 9 in (175 cm)
- Weight: 163 lb (74 kg)

Rugby union career
- Position: Hooker
International career
Years	Team	Apps	(Points)
1975	France	2	(0)

Jean-Louis Ugartemendia (10 July 1943 – 21 December 2020) was a French international rugby union player.

Born in Bayonne, Ugartemendia played his rugby for Basque club Saint-Jean-de-Luz Olympic.

Ugartemendia, a hooker, was a member of the France squad on their 1974 tour of Brazil and Argentina. He played against Brazil, but did not feature against the Pumas, which were the only capped matches. His two official caps both came during the 1975 Five Nations, against Scotland and Ireland, while he was a reserve on a further eight occasions.

== See also ==
- List of France national rugby union players
