= Jean-Louis Jordana =

French rugby union player (born 1968)

- Born: 7 November 1968 (age 58) Lavelanet, France
- Height: 6 ft 1 in (185 cm)
- Weight: 228 lb (103 kg)

Rugby union career
- Position: Prop
International career
| Years | Team | Apps | (Points) |
| 1996–97 | France | 7 | (0) |

Jean-Louis Jordana (born 7 November 1968) is a French former rugby union international.

A native of Lavelanet in Ariège department, Jordana was capped seven times by the France national team as a prop between 1996 and 1997, debuting in a home win over Romania. He featured on the 1996 tour of Argentina and gained three caps in the 1997 Five Nations Championship, where France achieved the grand slam.

Jordana, who had eight seasons at Section Paloise, crossed to Stade Toulousain in 1996. He won two French Championships during his time with Stade Toulousain. A knee injury forced him to retire in 2000.

== See also ==
- List of France national rugby union players
