= Patrice Péron =

French rugby union player (1949–2025)

- Born: 20 June 1949 Colombes, France
- Died: 29 December 2025 (aged 76)
- Height: 6 ft 2 in (188 cm)
- Weight: 208 lb (94 kg)

Rugby union career
- Position: Flanker
International career
Years	Team	Apps	(Points)
1975	France	2	(4)

Patrice Péron (20 June 1949 – 29 December 2025) was a French international rugby union player.

Péron was born in Colombes and played for Paris club Racing Club de France.

A flanker, Péron gained France representative honours on their 1975 tour of South Africa. He played in both Test matches against the Springboks, scoring a try on debut at Free State Stadium in Bloemfontein.

Péron died on 29 December 2025, at the age of 76.

== See also ==
- List of France national rugby union players
