= Michael Hunter (rugby union) =

Scotland international rugby union player

- Born: Michael Douglas Hunter; 24 April 1945 (age 81) Scotland

Rugby union career
- Position: Centre
Amateur team(s)
Years	Team	Apps	(Points)
- Glasgow HSFP
Provincial / State sides
Years	Team	Apps	(Points)
- Glasgow District
-	Scotland Possibles		
International career
Years	Team	Apps	(Points)
1971-72	Scotland 'B'	2	(0)
1974	Scotland	1	(0)
1974	Penguins		

Michael Hunter (born 24 April 1945) is a former Scotland international rugby union player.

== Rugby Union career ==
=== Amateur career ===
He played for Glasgow HSFP.

=== Provincial career ===
He played for Glasgow District. He was part of the Glasgow side that shared the 1974–75 Scottish Inter-District Championship with North and Midlands.

He played for Scotland Possibles on the trial match against the Scotland Probables side on 11 January 1975. He replaced Jordanhill's Andy Dougall in the centre. It was a strange trial; instead of playing 2 halves of 40 minutes, they played 3 thirds of 30 minutes each. In the first third, Hunter scored a try; and at the end of that third the Possibles were leading 6-0. The Probables came back into the match, but the Possibles ultimately took a rare victory, by 19 points to 16 points, in the fixture.

=== International career ===
He was capped by Scotland 'B' twice, between 1971 and 1972, both times against France 'B'.

He received a full senior cap for Scotland in 1974, against France in the Five Nations Championship. It was his only cap.

He went on the Penguins tour of Bermuda in 1974.
