= Gérald Martinez =

French rugby union player (born 1955)

- Born: 30 March 1955 (age 71) Montréjeau, France
- Height: 1.73 m (5 ft 8 in)
- Weight: 72 kg (11 st 5 lb)

Rugby union career
- Position: scrum half
Amateur team(s)
Years	Team	Apps	(Points)
1973-1984	Stade Toulousain		
1984-1989	Racing		
International career
Years	Team	Apps	(Points)
1982-1983	France	7	

Gérald Martinez (born 30 March 1955 in Montréjeau) is a retired French international rugby union scrum half for Stade Toulousain.

Martinez made his international début for France in February 1982, against Wales, but would have to fight with Jerome Gallion, Jean-Pierre Élissalde but mostly Pierre Berbizier for the France number 9 shirt.

== Honours ==
- French rugby champion finalist, 1980 with Stade Toulousain and 1987 with Racing Club de France
- Coupe de France 1984 with Stade Toulousain
