= Jean Costantino =

France international rugby union player

- Born: 28 September 1944 (age 82) Montauban, France
- Height: 5 ft 9 in (175 cm)
- Weight: 195 lb (88 kg)

Rugby union career
- Position: Front row
International career
Years	Team	Apps	(Points)
1973	France	1	(0)

Jean Costantino (born 28 September 1944) is a French former international rugby union player.

A product of US Montauban, Costantino joined AS Montferrand in 1972 and the following year gained his only France cap, packing the front row of the scrum in a FIRA Trophy match against Romania at Valence d'Agen. He was later part of the French squad as a reserve hooker on the 1975 tour of South Africa.

Costantino was employed outside of rugby as an EDF agent.

== See also ==
- List of France national rugby union players
