= Victor Boffelli =

French rugby union player (born 1947)

- Born: 20 March 1947 (age 79) Arques, Aude, France
- Height: 6 ft 2 in (188 cm)
- Weight: 199 lb (90 kg)

Rugby union career
- Position: Flanker
International career
Years	Team	Apps	(Points)
1971–75	France	18	(8)

Victor Boffelli (born 20 March 1947) is a French former rugby union coach and international player.

Boffelli, born in Arques, Aude, was a flanker and played his rugby for Aurillac.

Capped 18 times, Boffelli played for France between 1971 and 1975, marking his debut with a try in a win over the Wallabies in Colombes. He took part in three Five Nations campaigns and was on the 1974 tour of Argentina.

Boffelli, who continued at Aurillac as a coach after retiring, later took charge of AS Montferrand and led the team that won the 1998–99 European Challenge Cup. He is also a former France A national coach.

== See also ==
- List of France national rugby union players
