= Pouillon, Landes =

Pouillon
- Commune
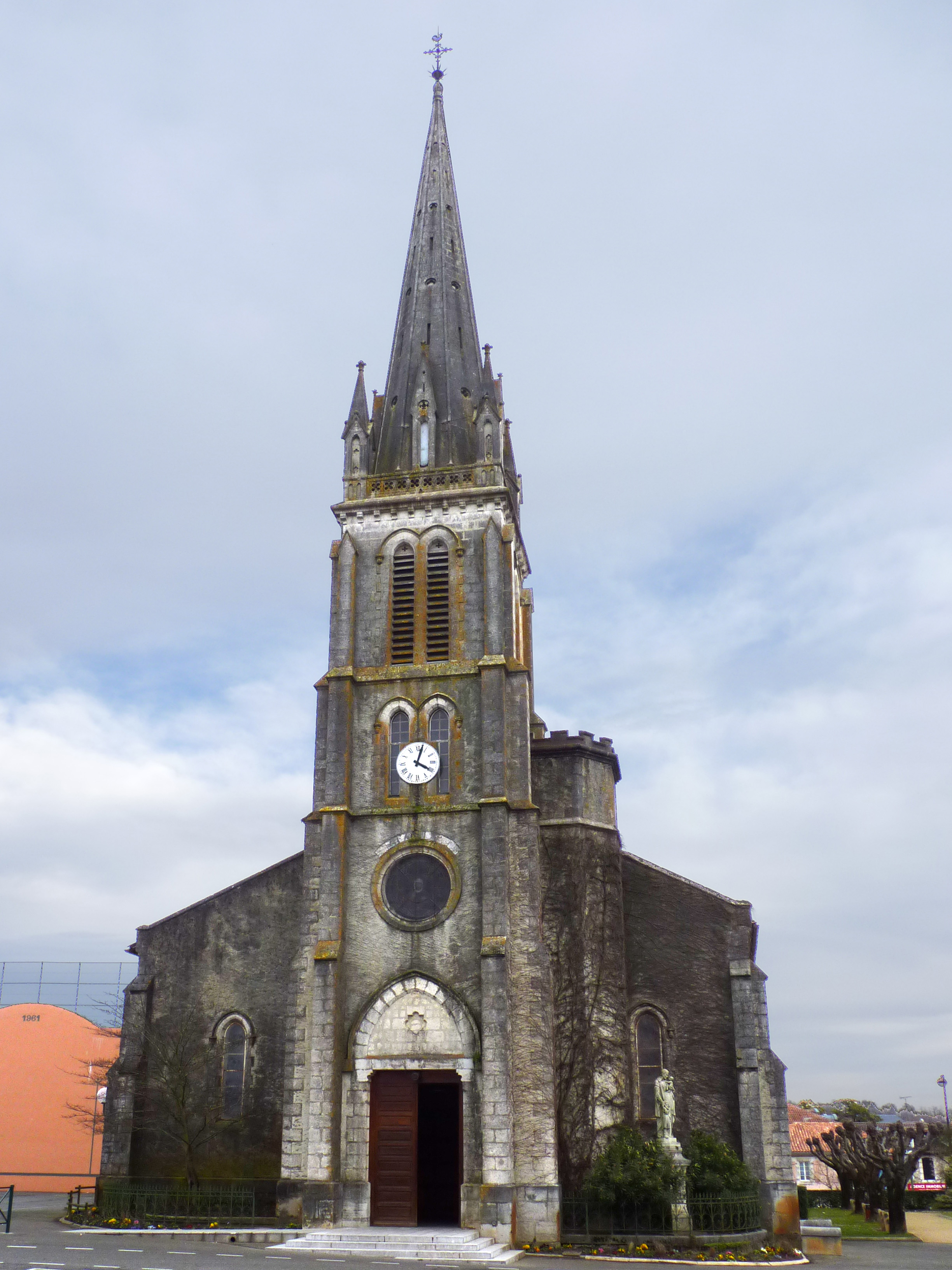

- Coat of arms
- Location of Pouillon
- Location within France Location within Nouvelle-Aquitaine
- Coordinates: 43°36′20″N 0°59′43″W
- Country: France
- Region: Nouvelle-Aquitaine
- Department: Landes
- Arrondissement: Dax
- Canton: Orthe et Arrigans

Government
  - Mayor (2024–2026): Thierry Le Pichon
- Area^{1}: 49.74 km^{2} (19.20 sq mi)
- Elevation: 25 m (82 ft)
- Highest elevation: 121 m (397 ft)
- Lowest elevation: 183 m (600 ft)
- Population (2023): 3,134
  - Density: 63.01/km^{2} (163.2/sq mi)
- Time zone: UTC+01:00 (CET)
  - Summer (DST): UTC+02:00 (CEST)
- INSEE/Postal code: 40233 /40350
- ^{1} French Land Register data, which excludes lakes, ponds, glaciers > 1 km^{2} (0.386 sq mi or 247 acres) and river estuaries.

Pouillon (French pronunciation: [pujɔ̃]; Occitan: Polhon) is a commune in the Landes department in Nouvelle-Aquitaine in southwestern France.

== Population ==
Historical population

Year	Pop.	±% p.a.
1793	3,940	—
1821	3,114	−0.84%
1846	3,360	+0.30%
1872	3,302	−0.07%
1901	3,342	+0.04%
1926	3,014	−0.41%
1946	2,795	−0.38%
1962	2,502	−0.69%
1968	2,450	−0.35%

Year	Pop.	±% p.a.
1975	2,425	−0.15%
1982	2,477	+0.30%
1990	2,596	+0.59%
1999	2,685	+0.38%
2007	2,782	+0.44%
2012	2,953	+1.20%
2017	3,072	+0.79%
2023	3,134	+0.33%

Source: EHESS and INSEE (1968-2023)

== Twin towns ==
- Daroca, Spain

== See also ==
- Communes of the Landes department
