= Montréjeau =

Montréjeau Montrejau (Occitan)
- Commune
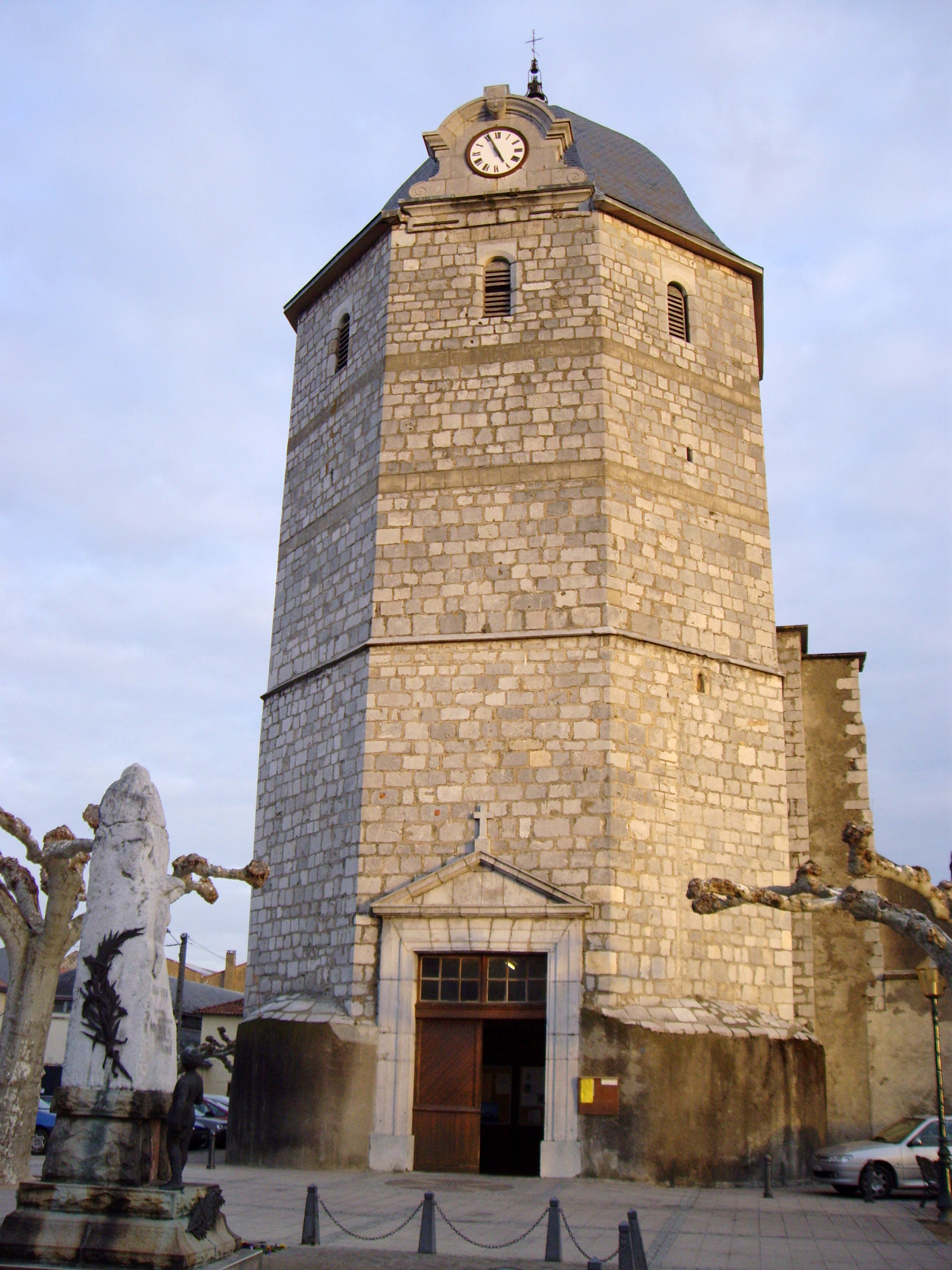
- The church in Montréjeau

- Coat of arms
- Location of Montréjeau
- Location within France Location within Occitanie
- Coordinates: 43°05′09″N 0°34′11″E
- Country: France
- Region: Occitania
- Department: Haute-Garonne
- Arrondissement: Saint-Gaudens
- Canton: Saint-Gaudens

Government
  - Mayor (2020–2026): Éric Miquel
- Area^{1}: 8.21 km^{2} (3.17 sq mi)
- Elevation: 455 m (1,493 ft)
- Highest elevation: 543 m (1,781 ft)
- Lowest elevation: 409 m (1,342 ft)
- Population (2023): 2,648
  - Density: 323/km^{2} (835/sq mi)
- Time zone: UTC+01:00 (CET)
  - Summer (DST): UTC+02:00 (CEST)
- INSEE/Postal code: 31390 /31210
- ^{1} French Land Register data, which excludes lakes, ponds, glaciers > 1 km^{2} (0.386 sq mi or 247 acres) and river estuaries.

Montréjeau (French pronunciation: [mɔ̃ʁeʒo]; Gascon: Montrejau) is a commune in the Haute-Garonne department in southwestern France. Montréjeau-Gourdan-Polignan station has rail connections to Toulouse, Pau, Bayonne, Tarbes, and Bagnères-de-Luchon.

== History ==
Montréjeau was the site of one of the French Revolution's last pitched battles between republicans and royalists. In the summer of 1799, anti-revolutionary insurrection broke out in the Haute-Garonne. For a brief time it flourished, even threatening the city of Toulouse. The Directory reacted swiftly, ordering in troops which decisively defeated the rebels at Montréjeau on 1 Fructidor Year VII (18 August 1799).

== Population ==
Historical population
Year	Pop.	±% p.a.
1968	3,700	—
1975	3,473	−0.90%
1982	3,161	−1.34%
1990	2,857	−1.26%
1999	2,577	−1.14%
2007	2,722	+0.69%
2012	2,834	+0.81%
2017	2,796	−0.27%
2023	2,648	−0.90%
Source: INSEE

== See also ==
- Communes of the Haute-Garonne department
