= 1996 France rugby union tour of Argentina =

- Coach: Jean-Claude Skrela
- Tour captain: P Saint-Andre
Summary
P	W	D	L
Total
6	5	0	1
Test match
2	2	0	0
Opponent
P	W	D	L
Argentina
2	2	0	0

== Matches ==
Scores and results list France's points tally first.

(test match)

Rival	Result	Date	Venue	City
Córdoba	22–19	10 June	Chateau Carreras	Cordoba
Buenos Aires	26–29	15 June	Estadio del CASI	San Isidro
Tucumán	20–10	18 June	Atlético Tucumán	S.M. Tucumán
Argentina	34–27	22 June	Ferro Carril Oeste	Buenos Aires
San Juan	51–0	25 June	San Juan Rugby Club	San Juan|
Argentina	34–15	29 June	Ferro Carril Oeste	Buenos Aires

== Touring party ==
- Manager: Jean-Claude Skrela
- Assistant manager: Jean Dunyach
- Captain: Philippe Saint-André

=== Fullbacks ===
- Jean-Luc Sadourny

=== Three-quarters ===
- Émile Ntamack
- Philippe Saint-André
- Stéphane Glas
- Richard Dourthe
- Thomas Castaignède
- David Berty

=== Half-backs ===
- Alain Penaud
- Philippe Carbonneau
- Guy Accoceberry

=== Forwards ===
- Philippe Benetton
- Abdelatif Benazzi
- Christophe Moni
- Fabien Pelous
- Olivier Roumat
- Olivier Merle
- Christian Califano
- Marc de Rougemont
- Hervé Guiraud
- Franck Tournaire
- Jean-Louis Jordana

== See also ==
- History of rugby union matches between Argentina and France
