= Pierre Chadebech =

France international rugby union player (born 1959)

- Born: 3 May 1959 (age 67) Ussel, France
- Height: 5 ft 10 in (178 cm)
- Weight: 188 lb (85 kg)

Rugby union career
- Position: Centre
International career
Years	Team	Apps	(Points)
1982–86	France	5	(0)

Pierre Chadebech (born 3 May 1959) is a French former international rugby union player.

Born in Ussel, Chadebech was a centre and played his rugby for CA Brive through the 1980s. He was capped five times by France, including two appearances during their 1986 Five Nations campaign, in which they were joint champions.

Chadebech coached RC Narbonne in the 2006–07 Top 14 season.

== See also ==
- List of France national rugby union players
