= Jean-Pierre Bastiat =

France international rugby union player (1949–2021)

- Born: 11 April 1949 Pouillon, Landes, France
- Died: 3 February 2021 (aged 71) Dax, France
- Height: 1.99 m (6 ft 6 in)
- Weight: 109 kg (240 lb)

Rugby union career
- Position(s): Lock, Number 8
Amateur team(s)
Years	Team	Apps	(Points)
- US Dax
International career
Years	Team	Apps	(Points)
1969-1978	France	32	(24)

Jean-Pierre Bastiat (11 April 1949 – 3 February 2021) was a French international rugby union player. He played as a Lock and Number 8 for US Dax.

Bastiat was born in Pouillon, Landes. As a youngster, Bariet played basketball. He earned his first cap with the French national team on 14 December 1969 against Romania at Colombes. He won the 1970 and 1973 Five Nations Championships, as well as the Grand Slam in the 1977 Five Nations Championship. The next year he captained France replacing the retired Jacques Fouroux. He retired in 1978 due to a knee injury. In total, Bastiat made 32 appearances for France between 1969 and 1978.

He died on 3 February 2021, following a stroke.

== Honours ==
- Selected to represent France, 1969–1979
- French rugby champion finalist 1973 with US Dax
- Grand Slam: 1977
- Five Nations Championship:1970, 1973 (shared), 1977
