= 2001 France rugby union tour of South Africa and New Zealand =

Summary
P	W	D	L
Total
3	1	0	2
Test match
3	1	0	3
Opponent
P	W	D	L
South Africa
2	1	0	1
New Zealand
1	0	0	1

== Matches ==
Scores and results list France's points tally first.

Opposing Team	For	Against	Date	Venue
South Africa	33	23	16 June	Ellis Park, Johannesburg
South Africa	15	20	23 June	Kings Park Stadium, Durban
New Zealand	12	37	30 June	Westpac Trust Stadium, Wellington
