= David Skrela =

French rugby union player (born 1979)

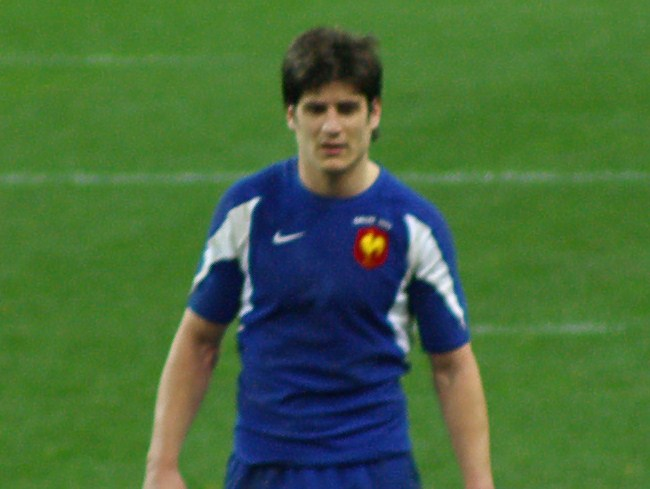
- Born: David Skrela; 2 March 1979 (age 47) Toulouse, France
- Height: 1.90 m (6 ft 3 in)
- Weight: 98 kg (15 st 6 lb)
- Notable relative(s): Jean-Claude Skrela (father), Gaëlle Skrela (sister)

Rugby union career
- Position(s): Scrum-half, Fly-half, Centre
Amateur team(s)
Years	Team	Apps	(Points)
- Stade Français
Senior career
Years	Team	Apps	(Points)
1997–2003	Colomiers	45	(497)
2003–2008	Stade Français	114	(1,119)
2008–2011	Toulouse	56	(596)
2011–2013	Clermont	41	(215)
2013–2016	Colomiers	53	(639)
International career
Years	Team	Apps	(Points)
2001–2011	France	23	(112)
- Correct as of 24 November 2011

David Skrela (born 2 March 1979) is a former French rugby union player. He most notably played for Stade Français and Toulouse in the Top 14 as well as the French national side as a fly-half or centre. He was renowned for his tackles and his kicking skills.

== Club career ==
In three years at Toulouse he won the Heineken Cup and the Top 14. In the 2010 Heineken Cup final he scored three penalties and two drop goals as Toulouse defeated Biarritz.

== International career ==
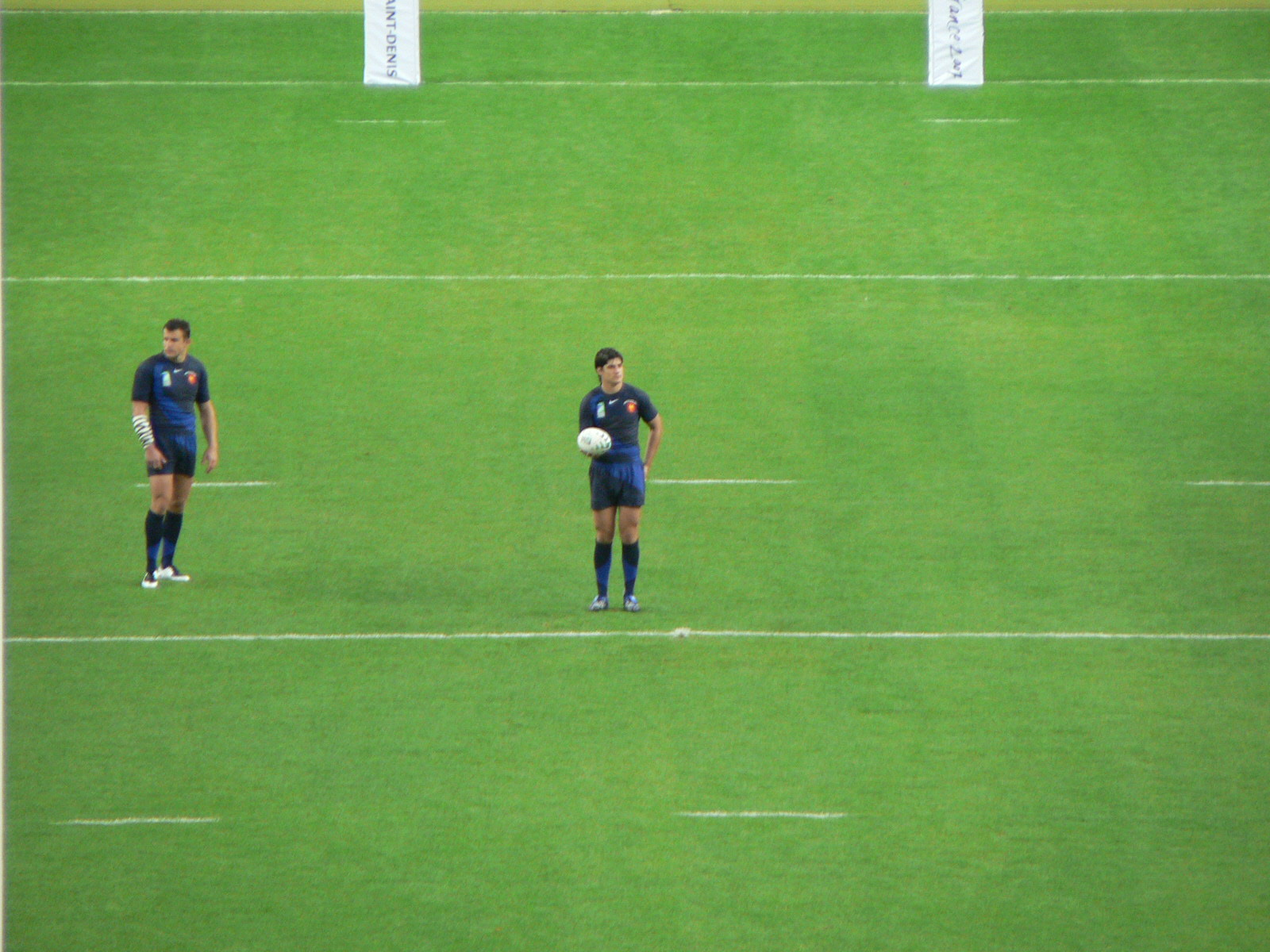
Skrela, right, holding ball; France vs. Argentina, 7 September 2007

Skrela won his first full international cap for France on 30 June 2001 against New Zealand. He did not earn his second until six years later, when his performances for Stade Français attracted the attention of French coach Bernard Laporte. He was part of the 2007 France Six Nations and World Cup squads and played in many of the team's matches. After returning to his hometown club Toulouse he was again selected under new coach Marc Lièvremont for France's 2008 autumn tests. On 11 May 2011 he was selected by Marc Lièvremont to participate in the next 2011 Rugby World Cup. The French coach underlined Skrela's skills and maturity. Skrela was injured in the opening game against Japan and withdrew from the tournament and replaced by Jean-Marc Doussain. France were beaten in the final by hosts New Zealand.

(Source: French Rugby Federation official website profile.)

== Personal life ==
Skrela is the son of the famous French international rugby player and coach Jean-Claude Skrela. His sister, Gaëlle, is a professional basketball player. He is of Polish descent on his father's side. At his father's insistence, he completed a diploma in civil engineering at Toulouse's Institut National des Sciences Appliquées before beginning his rugby career full-time. He is married to Celine, and has a daughter and a son; Cabiro and Mathieu.

== Honours ==
US Colomiers

- European Challenge Cup: 1998

Stade Français

- French championship: 2004, 2007

Stade Toulousain

- French championship: 2011
- Heineken Cup: 2010
