= Gaëlle Skrela =

French basketball player

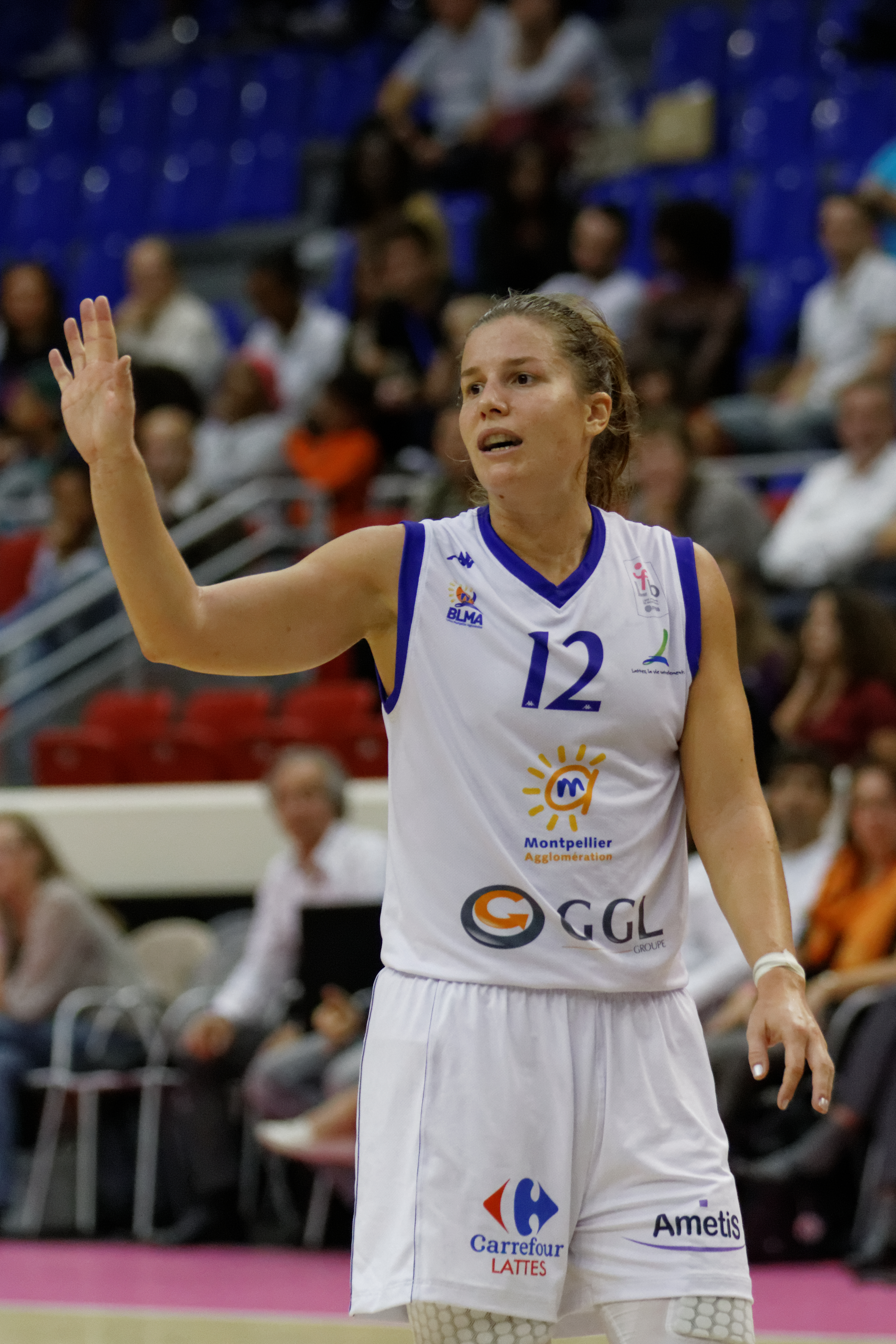
- Skrela in 2013

No. 12 – Basket Lattes
- Position: Guard
- League: LFB

Personal information
- Born: 24 January 1983 (age 43) Toulouse, France
- Listed height: 5 ft 10 in (1.78 m)

Gaëlle Skrela (born 24 January 1983) is a retired French basketball player for Basket Lattes and the French national team, where she participated at the 2014 FIBA World Championship. In 2016 she represented France at the 2016 Summer Olympics where her team lost 67-86 to the United States. She retired from basketball soon after the end of the Olympic games.

She is a sister to French international rugby union player David Skrela and is a daughter of former coach, Jean-Claude Skrela.
