= Thierry Janeczek =

French rugby union player (born 1959)

- Born: 6 August 1959 (age 67) St-Denis-du-Sig, Algeria
- Height: 6 ft 3 in (191 cm)
- Weight: 199 lb (90 kg)

Rugby union career
- Position: Flanker
International career
Years	Team	Apps	(Points)
1982–90	France	3	(0)

Thierry Janeczek (born 6 August 1959) is a French rugby union coach and former international player.

Born in French Algeria, Janeczek was a flanker and played his rugby with Stadoceste Tarbais, with which he contested the 1988 French Championship final. He won three France caps, making two appearances against Argentina in 1982, then returning in 1990 to play Romania. In 1993, Janeczek represented France at the Rugby World Cup Sevens.

Janeczek coached the France national rugby sevens team from 1996 to 2010. His most successful result while in charge of the team was a France Sevens tournament win during the 2004–05 World Sevens Series.

== See also ==
- List of France national rugby union players
