= Éric Buchet =

France international rugby union player

- Born: 28 November 1957 (age 68) Nice, France
- Height: 6 ft 2 in (188 cm)
- Weight: 201 lb (91 kg)

Rugby union career
- Position: Flanker
International career
Years	Team	Apps	(Points)
1980–82	France	5	(0)

Éric Buchet (born 28 November 1957) is a French former international rugby union player.

Born in Nice, Buchet was a flanker and obtained five caps for France, making his debut against Romania at Bucharest in 1980. He featured once during the 1982 Five Nations, and made his other three appearances later that year, which included two home Test matches against Argentina. At club level, Buchet played his rugby for RC Nice and was captain of their 1985 Challenge Yves du Manoir–winning side.

Buchet's son Laurent was a professional rugby player.

== See also ==
- List of France national rugby union players
