= 1986 France rugby union tour of Argentina, Australia and New Zealand =

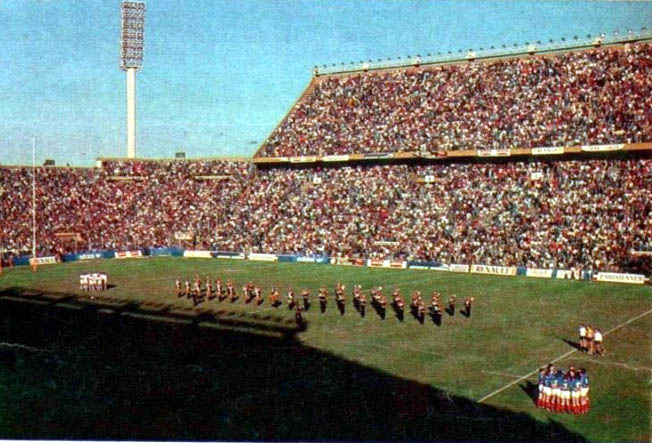
- Velez Sarsfield Stadium, venue in Argentina
- Date: May–Jun 1986
Summary
| P | W | D | L |
Total
| 8 | 4 | 1 | 3 |
Test match
| 4 | 1 | 0 | 3 |
Opponent
| P | W | D | L |
Argentina
| 2 | 1 | 0 | 1 |
Australia
| 1 | 0 | 0 | 1 |
New Zealand
| 1 | 0 | 0 | 1 |

The 1986 France rugby union tour of Argentina, Australia and New Zealand was a series of eight matches played by French national rugby union team touring those countries between May and June 1986.

For the first time, a test match played by Argentina was arranged at the José Amalfitani Stadium, the ground of football team Vélez Sarsfield.

== Matches ==
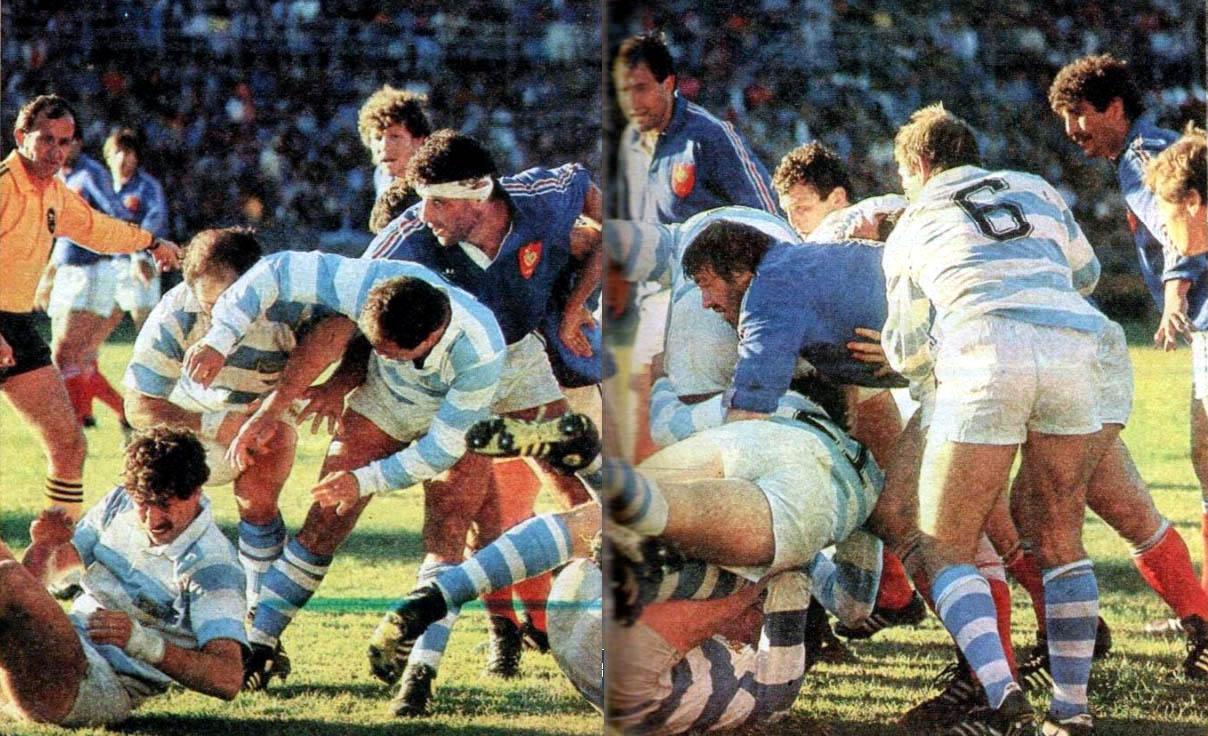
France v Argentina, 1st test match

Test matches

| Date | Rival | Res. | Score | Venue | City |
|---|---|---|---|---|---|
| 31 May | Argentina | lost | 13–15 | Vélez Sarsfield | Buenos Aires |
| 2 June | Invitación XV | won | 45–24 | Club Estudiantes | Paraná |
| 7 June | Argentina | won | 22–9 | Vélez Sarsfield | Buenos Aires |
| 14 June | Queensland | won | 48–9 | Ballymore | Brisbane |
| 17 June | Australian Capital Territory | draw | 18–18 | Canberra Stadium | Canberra |
| 21 June | Australia | lost | 14–27 | Cricket Ground | Sydney |
| 25 June | North Auckland | won | 30–19 | Okara Park | Whangārei |
| 28 June | New Zealand | lost | 9–18 | Lancaster Park | Christchurch |
