= 1999 France rugby union tour of Samoa, Tonga and New Zealand =

Summary
P	W	D	L
Total
4	1	0	3
Test match
3	1	0	2
Opponent
P	W	D	L
Western Samoa
1	1	0	0
Tonga
1	0	0	1
New Zealand
1	0	0	1

In 1999, the French national rugby union team conducted a tour of Samoa, Tonga and New Zealand.

== Matches ==
Scores and results list France's points tally first.

Opposing Team	For	Against	Date	Venue
Samoa	39	22	12 June	Apia Park, Apia
Tonga	16	20	16 June	Teufaiva Sport Stadium, Nukuʻalofa
New Zealand XV	24	45	20 June	Hamilton
New Zealand	7	54	26 June	Athletic Park, Wellington
