= 1985 France rugby union tour of Brazil, Argentina and Uruguay =

- Date: 5–30 Jun 1985
Summary
P	W	D	L
Total
9	8	0	1
Test match
4	3	0	1
Opponent
P	W	D	L
Brazil
1	1	0	0
Argentina
2	1	0	1
Uruguay
1	1	0	0

The 1985 France rugby union tour of South America was a series of matches played in June 1985 in South America by France national rugby union team.

== Matches ==
Complete list of matches played by France in South America:

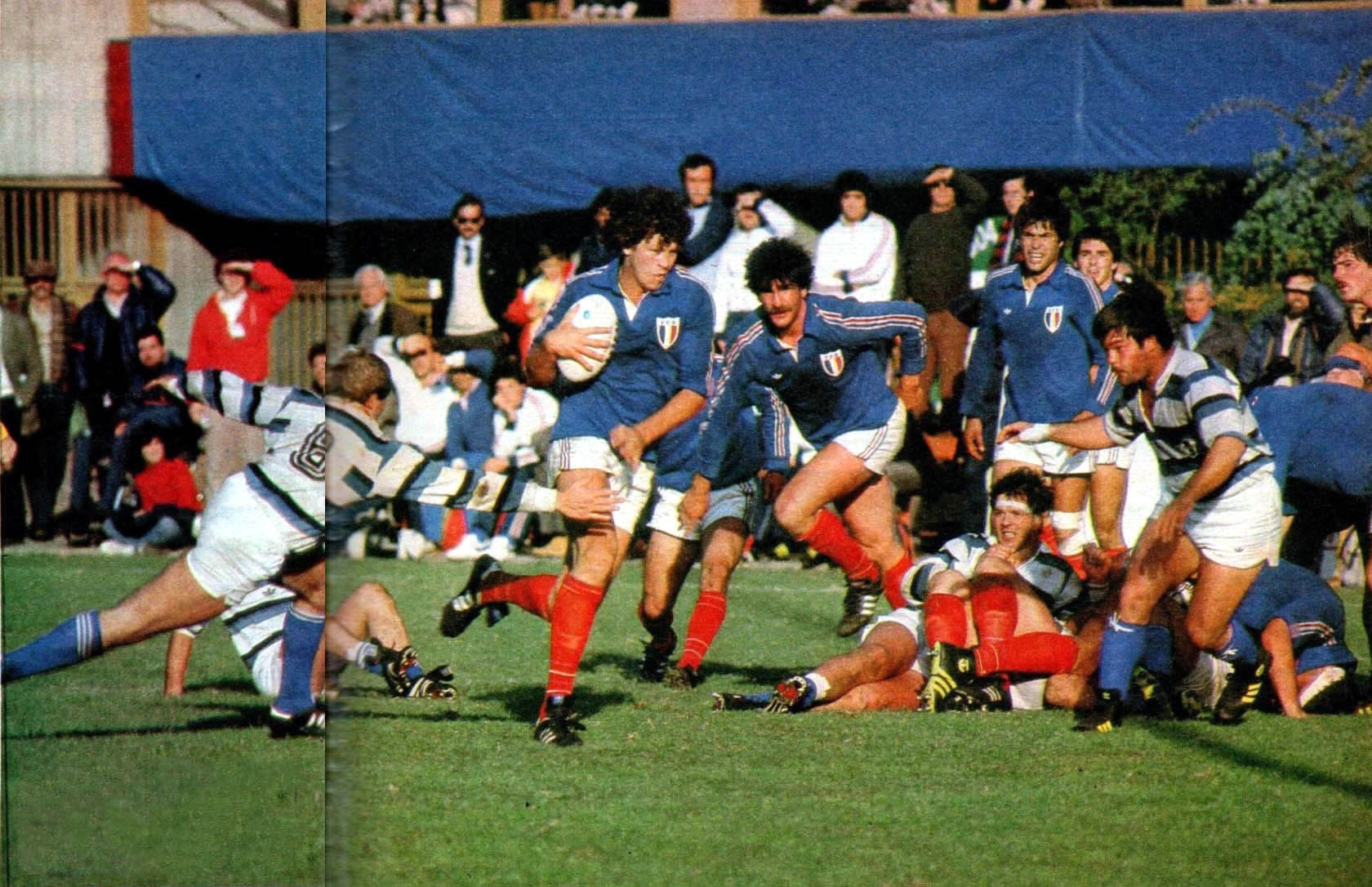
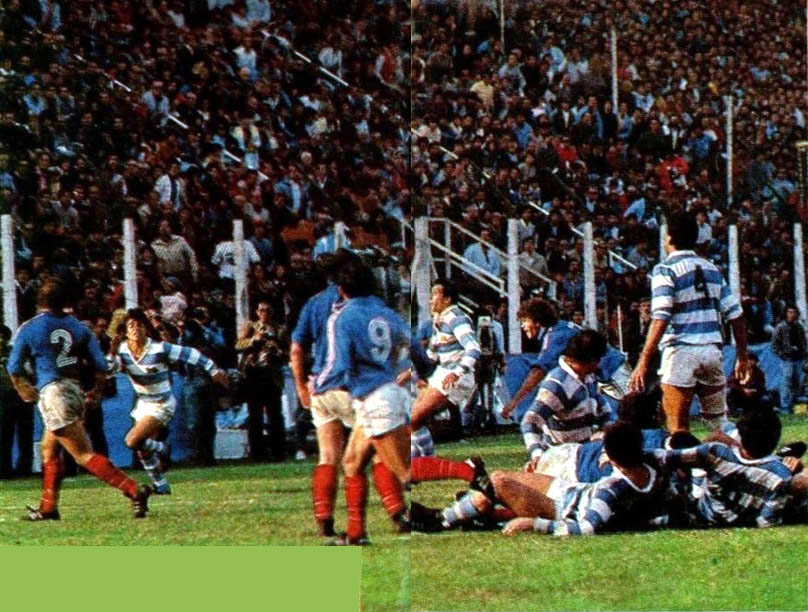
Some of the matches played in Argentina, (left) v San Isidro Club, (right) v Argentina, both at Ferro Carril Oeste

Test matches

#	Date	Rival	City	Venue	Score	Notes
1	5 June	Brazil	Niterói	Rio Cricket Club	41–6	(Note: France did not award full international caps.)
2	8 June	San Isidro Club	Buenos Aires	Ferro Carril Oeste	41–18	
3	12 June	Cuyo RU	Mendoza	Malvinas Argentinas	64–6	
4	15 June	Buenos Aires RU	Buenos Aires	Ferro Carril Oeste	50–15	
5	18 June	Tucumán RU	Banda del Río Salí	C.A. Concepción	24–7	
6	22 June	Argentina	Buenos Aires	Ferro Carril Oeste	16–24	
7	25 June	Santa Fe RU	Santa Fe	Colón	82–7	
8	29 June	Argentina	Buenos Aires	Ferro Carril Oeste	23–15	
9	30 June	Uruguay	Montevideo	?	34–6	
