= Latin Cup (rugby union) =

Rugby union competition, 1995 and 1997

Copa Latina
Tournament details
- Hosts: Argentina; France
- Date: October 1995 - October 1997
- Countries: France; Argentina; Italy; Romania

Final positions
- Champions: France (2nd title)
- Runner-up: Argentina

Tournament statistics
- Matches played: 12

The Copa Latina (in French: Coupe Latine; in Italian: Coppa Latina; in Romanian: Cupa Latina) was a rugby competition created in 1995 which featured Argentina, France, Italy, and Romania.

Only two editions were played, the first in Argentina in October 1995 and the second in France in October 1997 with Les Bleus winning both tournaments. In 2021 Argentina played Romania for a cup of the same name in a one-off test match.

== Championships ==
Year	Hosts	Champion	Runner Up	Third Place	Fourth Place
1995	Buenos Aires and Tucumán, Argentina	France	Argentina	Italy	Romania
1997	Auch, Lourdes and Tarbes, France	France	Argentina	Italy	Romania

== Historical Table ==
Rank	Team	Played				Scoring			Points
Rank	Team	Played	Wins	Draws	Losses	For	Against	Difference	Points
1.	France	6	6	0	0	234	91	+143	12
2.	Argentina	6	3	1	2	179	137	+42	7
3.	Italy	6	2	1	3	160	143	+17	5
4.	Romania	6	0	0	6	80	282	-202	0
