= Yves Brunet =

France international rugby union player

- Born: 25 August 1950 (age 76) Peyrestortes, France
- Height: 5 ft 9 in (175 cm)
- Weight: 185 lb (84 kg)

Rugby union career
- Position: Hooker
International career
Years	Team	Apps	(Points)
1975–77	France	2	(0)

Yves Brunet (born 25 August 1950) is a French former international rugby union player.

A USA Perpignan hooker, Brunet was capped twice for the France national team, debuting against the Springboks at Bloemfontein during a tour of South Africa in 1975. His other appearance came two years later against the Pumas on a tour of Argentina. He was the second member of his family to represent France, following elder brother Lambert who was internationally capped in rugby league.

Brunet is the father of the French singer known as Luce.

== See also ==
- List of France national rugby union players
