= 1991 France rugby union tour of the United States =

Summary
P	W	D	L
Total
2	2	0	0
Test match
2	2	0	0
Opponent
P	W	D	L
United States
2	2	0	0

== Matches ==
Scores and results list France's points tally first.

Opposing Team	For	Against	Date	Venue	Status	Ref.
United States	41	9	13 July 1991	Denver	Test match	
United States	10	3	20 July 1991	Colorado Springs, Colorado	Test match	
