= 1990 France rugby union tour of Australia =

Summary
P	W	D	L
Total
7	4	0	3
Test match
3	1	0	2
Opponent
P	W	D	L
Australia
3	1	0	2

The 1990 France rugby union tour of Australia was a series of matches played in June 1990 in Australia by the France national rugby union team

== Matches ==
Scores and results list France's points tally first.

Opposing team	For	Against	Date	Venue	Status	Ref.
New South Wales	19	12	2 June 1990	Sydney	Tour match	
Canberra Kookaburras	22	21	5 June 1990	Canberra	Tour match	
Australia	9	21	9 June 1990	Football Stadium, Sydney	Test match	
Australia University	29	19	13 June 1990	Brisbane	Tour match	
Queensland	3	15	17 June 1990	Ballymore, Brisbane	Tour match	
Australia	31	48	24 June 1990	Ballymore, Brisbane	Test match	
Australia	28	19	30 June 1990	Football Stadium, Sydney	Test match	
