= 1998 France rugby union tour of Argentina and Fiji =

Summary
P	W	D	L
Total
5	4	0	1
Test match
3	3	0	0
Opponent
P	W	D	L
Argentina
2	2	0	0
Fiji
1	1	0	0

The 1998 France rugby union tour of Australia and Fiji was a series of matches played in June 1998 in Argentina and Fiji by France national rugby union team.

== Results ==
(test match)

Rival	Score	Date	Venue	City
Argentina	35–18	13 June	Vélez Sarsfield	Buenos Aires
Buenos Aires	22–36	16 June	Buenos Aires CRC	Los Polvorines
Argentina	37–12	20 June	Vélez Sarsfield	Buenos Aires
Fiji	36–32	24 June	Prince Charles Park	Nadi
Fiji	34–9	27 June	National Stadium	Suva

== Bibliography ==
- Mick Cleary, ed. (1999). Rothmans Rugby Union Yearbook 1999-00. Headline. ISBN 0-7472-7531-9.
