= Jean-Claude Skrela =

French rugby union player (born 1949)

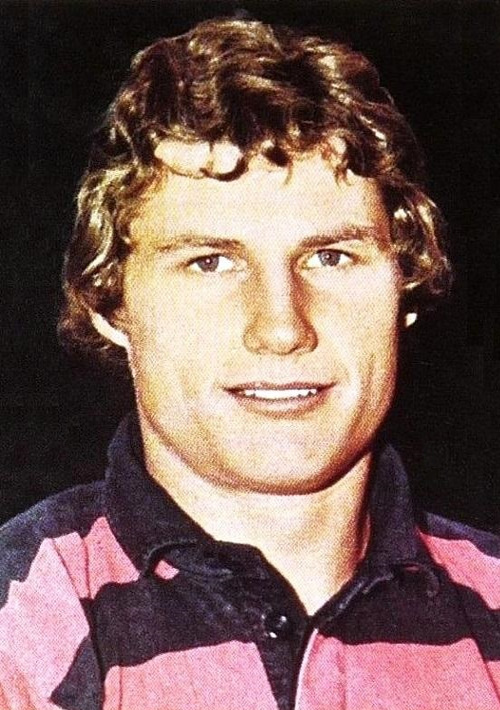
- Jean-Claude Skrela in 1971
- Born: 1 October 1949 (age 77) Colomiers, France
- Height: 6 ft 2 in (1.88 m)
- Weight: 199 lb (90 kg)
- Notable relative(s): David Skrela (son); Gaëlle Skrela (daughter)

Rugby union career
- Position: Flanker
Amateur team(s)
Years	Team	Apps	(Points)
1968–1970	FC Auch Gers		
1970–1983	Stade Toulousain		
International career
Years	Team	Apps	(Points)
1971–1978	France	46	(24)
Coaching career
- Years: Team
- 1983–1992: Stade Toulousain
- 1994–1995: US Colomiers
- 1995–1999: France
- Correct as of 2019-03-27

Jean-Claude Skrela (born 1 October 1949 in Colomiers, Haute-Garonne) is a former coach of the French national rugby union team. His son, David Skrela, is a French rugby union player and his daughter, Gaëlle Skrela, is a professional basketball player.

== Early life ==
Skrela was born in Colomiers near Toulouse in France. His parents were Polish refugees (his father came from the village Kobiela, his mother from the village Charbinowice). He lost his father when he was 12.

== Playing career ==
He played for FC Auch and Stade Toulousain and made his debut for France in 1971 against South Africa. He won forty-six caps and won the Five Nations Championship in 1973 (tie victory) and in 1977 (Grand Slam). He also scored the first four-point try in a major Test match on 20 November 1971, when he charged down a kick from Australian fullback Arthur McGill.

== Coaching ==
In 1983, he joined his team-mate Pierre Villepreux as coach of Stade Toulousain. They won three times the home championship, twice against Toulon (in 1985 and in 1989) and against Agen in 1986.

He was appointed director of rugby at Colomiers in 1994 but left his position to replace Pierre Berbizier as French head coach after the 1995 Rugby World Cup.

He became the first European head coach to win on his first attempt against New Zealand, but he failed to win against South Africa and Australia like his predecessor Pierre Berbizier. France suffered a few defeats against lowest level teams, like Tonga in 1999 or like Italy in 1997 (Italy was making a lot of progress at this stage), but was also able to make great come backs, like against England in 1997 or against New Zealand in their World Cup semi final at Twickenham. He also made a back-to-back Grand Slam in 1997 and 1998. He suffered a lack of results in 1999 before the World Cup.

After Jacques Fouroux, he became the second head coach to lead France to the World Cup Final, but lost to Australia. He resigned as French head coach on 16 November 1999.

== International matches as Head coach ==
Matches (1995–1999)
Matches	Date	Opposition	Venue	Score (Fra.–Opponent)	Competition	Captain
1995
1	14 October	Italy	Estadio Arquitecto Ricardo Etcheverry, Buenos Aires	34–22	Latin Cup	Philippe Saint-André
2	17 October	Romania	Estadio Monumental José Fierro, Tucumán	52–8	Latin Cup	Philippe Saint-André
3	21 October	Argentina	Estadio Arquitecto Ricardo Etcheverry, Buenos Aires	47–20	Latin Cup	Philippe Saint-André
4	11 November	New Zealand	Stadium de Toulouse, Toulouse	22–15	Autumn internationals	Philippe Saint-André
5	18 November	New Zealand	Parc des Princes, Paris	12–37	Autumn internationals	Philippe Saint-André
1996
6	20 January	England	Parc des Princes, Paris	15–12	1996 Five Nations	Philippe Saint-André
7	3 February	Scotland	Murrayfield Stadium, Edinburgh	14–19	1996 Five Nations	Philippe Saint-André
8	17 February	Ireland	Parc des Princes, Paris	45–10	1996 Five Nations	Philippe Saint-André
9	16 March	Wales	Arms Park, Cardiff	15–16	1996 Five Nations	Philippe Saint-André
10	20 April	Romania	Stade Jean Alric, Aurillac	64–12	Test match	Philippe Saint-André
11	22 June	Argentina	Estadio Arquitecto Ricardo Etcheverry, Buenos Aires	34–27	1996 tour	Philippe Saint-André
12	29 June	Argentina	Estadio Arquitecto Ricardo Etcheverry, Buenos Aires	34–15	1996 tour	Philippe Saint-André
13	25 September	Wales	Arms Park, Cardiff	40–33	Test match	Philippe Saint-André
14	30 November	South Africa	Parc Lescure, Bordeaux	12–22	Autumn internationals	Abdelatif Benazzi
15	7 December	South Africa	Parc des Princes, Paris	12–13	Autumn internationals	Abdelatif Benazzi
1997
16	18 January	Ireland	Lansdowne Road, Dublin	32–15	1997 Five Nations	Abdelatif Benazzi
17	15 February	Wales	Parc des Princes, Paris	27–22	1997 Five Nations	Abdelatif Benazzi
18	1 March	England	Twickenham, London	23–20	1997 Five Nations	Abdelatif Benazzi
19	15 March	Scotland	Parc des Princes, Paris	47–20	1997 Five Nations	Abdelatif Benazzi
20	22 March	Italy	Stade Lesdiguières, Grenoble	32–40	1995-97 European Cup final	Fabien Pelous
21	1 June	Romania	Stadionul Dinamo, Bucharest	51–20	1997 tour	Abdelatif Benazzi
22	21 June	Australia	Sydney Football Stadium, Sydney	15–29	1997 tour	Abdelatif Benazzi
23	28 June	Australia	Ballymore Stadium, Brisbane	19–26	1997 tour	Abdelatif Benazzi
24	18 October	Italy	Stade Jacques Fouroux, Auch	30–19	Latin Cup	Philippe Saint-André
25	22 October	Romania	Stade Antoine Béguère, Lourdes	39–3	Latin Cup	Philippe Saint-André
26	26 October	Argentina	Stade Maurice Trélut, Tarbes	32–27	Latin Cup	Philippe Saint-André
27	15 November	South Africa	Stade de Gerland, Lyon	32–36	Autumn internationals	Philippe Saint-André
28	22 November	South Africa	Parc des Princes, Paris	10–52	Autumn internationals	Philippe Saint-André
1998
29	7 February	England	Stade de France, Saint-Denis	24–17	1998 Five Nations	Raphaël Ibañez
30	21 February	Scotland	Murrayfield Stadium, Edinburgh	51–16	1998 Five Nations	Raphaël Ibañez
31	7 March	Ireland	Stade de France, Saint-Denis	18–16	1998 Five Nations	Raphaël Ibañez
32	5 April	Wales	Wembley Stadium, London	51–0	1998 Five Nations	Raphaël Ibañez
33	13 June	Argentina	Estadio José Amalfitani, Buenos Aires	35–18	1998 tour	Raphaël Ibañez
34	20 June	Argentina	Estadio José Amalfitani, Buenos Aires	37–12	1998 tour	Raphaël Ibañez
35	27 June	Fiji	National Stadium, Suva	34–9	1998 tour	Raphaël Ibañez
36	14 November	Argentina	Stade de la Beaujoire, Nantes	34–14	Autumn internationals	Raphaël Ibañez
37	21 November	Australia	Stade de France, Saint-Denis	21–32	Autumn internationals	Raphaël Ibañez
1999
38	6 February	Ireland	Lansdowne Road, Dublin	10–9	1999 Five Nations	Raphaël Ibañez
39	6 March	Wales	Stade de France, Saint-Denis	33–34	1999 Five Nations	Raphaël Ibañez
40	20 March	England	Twickenham, London	10–21	1999 Five Nations	Raphaël Ibañez
41	10 April	Scotland	Stade de France, Saint-Denis	22–36	1999 Five Nations	Raphaël Ibañez
42	3 June	Romania	Stade Pierre Antoine, Castres	62–8	Test match	Raphaël Ibañez
43	12 June	Samoa	Apia Park, Apia	39–22	1999 tour	Raphaël Ibañez
44	16 June	Tonga	Teufaiva Sport Stadium, Nuku'alofa	16–20	1999 tour	Fabien Galthié
45	26 June	New Zealand	Athletic Park, Wellington	7–54	1999 tour	Raphaël Ibañez
46	28 August	Wales	Millennium Stadium, Cardiff	23–34	1999 RWC Warm-up	Raphaël Ibañez
47	2 October	Canada	Stade de la Méditerranée, Béziers	33–20	1999 Rugby World Cup	Raphaël Ibañez
48	8 October	Namibia	Parc Lescure, Bordeaux	47–13	1999 Rugby World Cup	Raphaël Ibañez
49	16 October	Fiji	Stadium de Toulouse, Toulouse	28–19	1999 Rugby World Cup	Raphaël Ibañez
50	24 October	Argentina	Lansdowne Road, Dublin, Ireland	47–26	1999 Rugby World Cup	Raphaël Ibañez
51	31 October	New Zealand	Twickenham, London, England	43–31	1999 Rugby World Cup	Raphaël Ibañez
52	6 November	Australia	Millennium Stadium, Cardiff, Wales	12–35	1999 Rugby World Cup	Raphaël Ibañez

=== Record by country ===
Opponent	Played	Won	Drew	Lost	Win ratio (%)	For	Against
Argentina	8	8	0	0	100	300	159
Australia	4	0	0	4	0	67	122
Canada	1	1	0	0	100	33	20
England	4	3	0	1	75	72	70
Fiji	2	2	0	0	100	72	28
Ireland	4	4	0	0	100	105	50
Italy	3	2	0	1	67	96	81
Namibia	1	1	0	0	100	47	13
New Zealand	4	2	0	2	50	84	137
Romania	5	5	0	0	100	268	51
Samoa	1	1	0	0	100	39	22
Scotland	4	2	0	2	50	134	91
South Africa	4	0	0	4	0	66	123
Tonga	1	0	0	1	0	16	20
Wales	6	3	0	3	50	189	139
TOTAL	52	34	0	18	65	1588	1126

=== Honours ===
- Five Nations Championship
  - Winner 1997, 1998
- Rugby World Cup
  - Runner-up 1999
- Latin Cup
  - Winner 1995, 1997
- Trophée des Bicentenaires
  - Runner-up 1997, 1998

== Other honours ==
=== As a player ===
France

- Five Nations Championship
  - Winner 1973, 1977
  - Runner-up 1976, 1978

Stade toulousain

- France Rugby Union Championship
  - Runner-up 1980
- Challenge Yves du Manoir
  - Runner-up 1971

=== As a coach ===
Stade toulousain

- France Rugby Union Championship
  - Winner 1985, 1986, 1989
  - Runner-up 1991
- Challenge Yves du Manoir
  - Winner 1988
  - Runner-up 1984

Sporting positions
Preceded by (France) Pierre Berbizier	France national rugby union team coach 1995–1999	Succeeded by (France) Bernard Laporte
