= Joël Pécune =

French rugby union player (born 1951)

- Born: 3 March 1951 (age 75) Ibos, France
- Height: 5 ft 6 in (168 cm)
- Weight: 160 lb (73 kg)

Rugby union career
- Position: Centre / Wing
International career
| Years | Team | Apps | (Points) |
| 1974–76 | France | 10 | (16) |

Joël Pécune (born 3 March 1951) is a French former rugby union international.

Born in Ibos, Pécune was a three-quarter, who appeared primarily as a centre. He played his club rugby for Tarbes and was a member of the side that were French champions in 1973, scoring their first try in the final against US Dax.

Pécune played for France from 1974 to 1976, gaining 10 caps. His four tries included a double against the visiting Pumas at the Stade de Gerland in 1975. Military service kept him out of selection contention during France's 1977 grand slam.

A gym teacher by profession, Pécune had an unsuccessful stint coaching Tarbes in the late 1990s.

== See also ==
- List of France national rugby union players
