= Michel Droitecourt =

French rugby union player

- Born: 30 October 1949 (age 77)
- Height: 1.78 m (5 ft 10 in)
- Weight: 78 kg (172 lb)

Rugby union career
- Position: Fullback
Amateur team(s)
Years	Team	Apps	(Points)
1970-1982	AS Montferrandaise	281	(720)
International career
Years	Team	Apps	(Points)
1972-1977	France	17	(14)

Michel Droitecourt (born 30 October 1949) is a former French rugby union player who was capped 17 times for France.

Droitecourt played as Fullback for the AS Montferrandaise where he played 2 final of the French Championship. With France he played 3 five Nations Championship but didn't win any titles.

== Honours ==
- Selected to represent France, 1972–1977
- Challenge Yves du Manoir 1976
- French championship finalist 1970 and 1978
