= Roland Bertranne =

France international rugby union player (1949–2025)

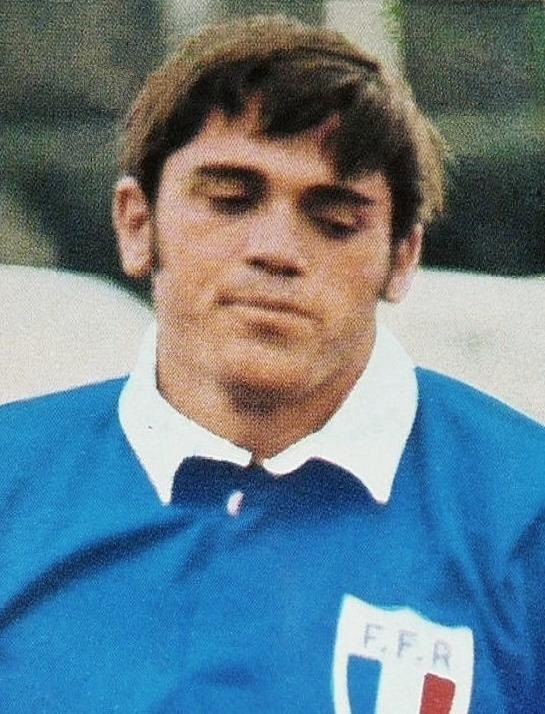
- Bertranne in 1971
- Born: 6 December 1949 Ibos, France
- Died: 2 October 2025 (aged 75) Bagnères-de-Bigorre, France
- Height: 1.73 m (5 ft 8 in)
- Weight: 80 kg (176 lb)

Rugby union career
- Position: Centre
Amateur team(s)
Years	Team	Apps	(Points)
- Stade Bagnérais
- Toulon
International career
Years	Team	Apps	(Points)
1971–1981	France	69	(66)

Roland Bertranne (6 December 1949 – 2 October 2025) was a French rugby union player. He played as a centre.

== Biography ==
Bertranne played for Stade Bagnérais and Toulon. He earned his first national cap on 27 February 1971 against the England in Twickenham and scored a try on debut.

He held the French record for most caps, 69, surpassing Benoît Dauga's previous record of 63 caps in 1981. Bertranne held the record until 1989, when Serge Blanco established a new mark with his 70th cap. He still holds the French record of consecutive caps.

Bertranne also played for the Barbarians and for a World XV on 9 August 1980 against Argentina in Buenos Aires, losing 36-22. Bertranne was the youngest member of the RFU President's Overseas XV squad that played four matches as part of the centenary celebrations of the Rugby Football Union in 1971.

Bertranne died from complications of Alzheimer's disease on 2 October 2025, at the age of 75.

== Honours ==
- Grand Slam : 1977, 1981
- French rugby champion finalist, 1979, 1981 with Stade Bagnérais.
