= Jean-Pierre Romeu =

French rugby union player (born 1948)

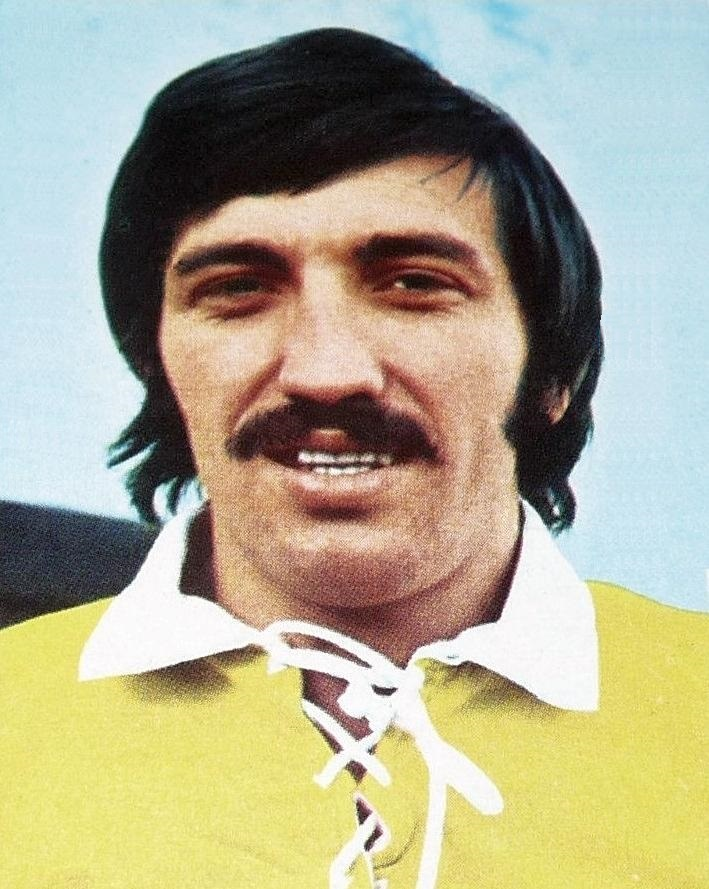
- Romeu with Clermont in 1971
- Born: Jean-Pierre Romeu; 15 April 1948 (age 78) Thuir, France
- Height: 1.80 m (5 ft 11 in)

Rugby union career
- Position: Fly half
Senior career
Years	Team	Apps	(Points)
1967–1968	US Carmaux		
1968–1981	Clermont	266	(2087)
International career
Years	Team	Apps	(Points)
1972–1977	France	34	(265)

Jean-Pierre Romeu (born 15 April 1948) is a former French rugby union footballer. His position was initially fly-half. Although he was born in Thuir to a French-Catalan family, he was nicknamed Le Gaulois (The Gaul), for his drooping moustache.

== Career of the rugbyman ==
His father Pierre, a rear-back from the rugby team of Thuir, decided to finish his sporting career far from Roussillon in Carmaux. Thinking about his own retraining, with a technical job on the Pit head and sidelines of the mine ("sur le carreau"), he took his whole family with him. His young son Jean-Pierre then first played for US Carmaux, in 1967/68. He moved afterwards to ASM Clermont Auvergne, where he played from 1968/69 to 1980/81. He won the Challenge Yves du Manoir, in 1976, and he was runners-up to the French Championship in 1977/78.

He had 34 caps for France, from 1972 to 1977, scoring 4 tries, 27 conversions, 56 penalties and 9 drop goals, on an aggregate of 265 points. He is the sixth highest point scorer for the French international team. He played in five competitions of the Five Nations Championship, in 1973, being winner ex-aequo, 1974, 1975, 1976 and 1977, winning once again. He was the top scorer at the 1976 Five Nations Championship.

== Honours ==
- Selected to represent France, 1972-1977 (247 pts in 34 tests)
- Challenge Yves du Manoir 1976 with ASM Clermont Auvergne
- French championship finalist 1976 with ASM Clermont Auvergne

== Quotation ==
- Advice from the welsh rugbyman Barry John to Jean-Pierre Romeu: A half-forward must impose his personality: he must dictate the game without worrying about pressure from anyone

== Bibliography ==
- Georges Raynaud, Jean-Pierre Romeu : De la mine au soleil, Éditions Solar, 1977, 160 p, with three forewords of Jacques Fouroux, Raphaël Géminiani and Georges Raynaud. ISBN 2-263-00177-8. A short biography from the Carmaux mine club to the sporting sky of the XV de France.
