= 1978 Wales rugby union tour of Australia =

Summary
P	W	D	L
Total
9	5	0	4
Test match
2	0	0	2
Opponent
P	W	D	L
Australia
2	0	0	2

Tour chronology
- ← 1975 Asia 1986 Oceania →

The 1978 Wales rugby union tour of Australia was a series of nine matches played by the Wales national rugby union team in Australia in May and June 1978. The Welsh team won five matches and lost four, including losing both of their international matches against the Australia national rugby union team.

== Results ==
Scores and results list Wales's score first.

	Date	Opponent	Location	Result	Score
Match 1	21 May	Western Australia	Perry Lakes Stadium, Perth	Won	32–3
Match 2	24 May	Victoria	Olympic Park Stadium, Melbourne	Won	52–3
Match 3	27 May	Sydney	Sydney Sports Ground, Sydney	Lost	16–18
Match 4	30 May	New South Wales Country	Cobar	Won	33–0
Match 5	3 June	New South Wales	Sydney Sports Ground, Sydney	Won	18–0
Match 6	6 June	Queensland	Ballymore, Brisbane	Won	31–24
Match 7	11 June	Australia	Ballymore, Brisbane	Lost	8–18
Match 8	13 June	Australian Capital Territory	Canberra	Lost	20–21
Match 9	17 June	Australia	Sydney Cricket Ground, Sydney	Lost	17–19

== Test matches ==
=== First test ===
11 June 1978

Australia	18–8	Wales
Try: Crowe; Con: McLean; Pen: McLean (4)		Try: Ge. Davies; B. Williams

Ballymore, Brisbane
Referee: R. T. Burnett (Australia)

AUSTRALIA: Laurie Monaghan, Paddy Batch, Andrew Slack, Phil Crowe, Martin Knight, Paul McLean, Rod Hauser, Stan Pilecki, Peter Horton, Steve Finnane, Garrick Fay, David Hillhouse, Greg Cornelsen, Mark Loane, Tony Shaw (c)

WALES: J. P. R. Williams, Gerald Davies, Steve Fenwick, Ray Gravell, J. J. Williams, Gareth Davies, Brynmor Williams, Graham Price, Bobby Windsor, Charlie Faulkner, Geoff Wheel, Allan Martin, Jeff Squire, Derek Quinnell, Terry Cobner (c)

=== Second test ===
17 June 1978

Australia	19–17	Wales
Try: Loane; Pen: McLean (3); Drop: McLean; Monaghan		Try: Ge. Davies; Holmes; Pen: Ga. Davies (2); Drop: Ga. Davies

Sydney Cricket Ground, Sydney
Attendance: 41,000
Referee: R. G. Byres (Australia)

AUSTRALIA: Laurie Monaghan, Paddy Batch, Andrew Slack, Phil Crowe, Martin Knight, Paul McLean, Rod Hauser, Stan Pilecki, Peter Horton, Steve Finnane, Garrick Fay, David Hillhouse, Greg Cornelsen, Mark Loane, Tony Shaw (c)

WALES: Alun Donovan (rep Gareth Evans), Gerald Davies (c), Steve Fenwick, Ray Gravell, J. J. Williams, Gareth Davies, Terry Holmes, Graham Price (rep John Richardson), Bobby Windsor, Charlie Faulkner, Geoff Wheel, Allan Martin, J. P. R. Williams, Clive Davis, Stuart Lane

== Touring party ==
- Manager: Clive Rowlands
- Assistant manager/coach: John Dawes
- Captain: Terry Cobner

=== Full-back ===
- J. P. R. Williams (Bridgend)

=== Three-quarters ===
- Gerald Davies (Cardiff)
- Gareth Evans (Newport)
- J. J. Williams (Llanelli)
- Pat Daniels (Cardiff)
- Alun Donovan (Swansea)
- Steve Fenwick (Bridgend)
- Ray Gravell (Llanelli)

=== Half-backs ===
- Gareth Davies (Cardiff)
- David Richards (Swansea)
- Brynmor Williams (Newport)
- Terry Holmes (Cardiff)

=== Forwards ===
- Clive Davis (Newbridge)
- Derek Quinnell (Llanelli)
- Jeff Squire (Newport)
- Terry Cobner (Pontypool)
- Stuart Lane (Cardiff)
- Barry Clegg (Swansea)
- Allan Martin (Aberavon)
- Geoff Wheel (Swansea)
- Charlie Faulkner (Pontypool)
- Graham Price (Pontypool)
- John Richardson (Aberavon)
- Mike Watkins (Cardiff)
- Bobby Windsor (Pontypool)
