= 1976 Argentina rugby union tour of Wales and England =

Summary
P	W	D	L
Total
6	3	0	3
Test match
1	0	0	1
Opponent
P	W	D	L
Wales
1	0	0	1

The 1976 Argentina rugby union tour of Wales and England was a series of six matches played by the Argentina national rugby union team in September and October 1976.

Five of the six matches were played in Wales, including an international match against the Wales national rugby union team. Argentina won the first three matches of the tour but lost the last three. Although Wales did not award caps for the international game, they did select a full-strength team and Argentina came close to winning; they led 19–17 as the match went into injury time but were beaten by a late penalty from Phil Bennett. Wales had won the Grand Slam in 1976 and Argentina's performance was considered a shock.

== Matches ==
29 September 1976

East Wales	22–25	Argentina
Try: Juliff, Butcher; Con: Lewis; Pen: Lewis 4		Try: G. Beccar Varela, Neyrá; Carracedo, Penalty try Con: Sansot, G. Beccar Varela, Porta; Pen: Porta

Rodney Parade, Newport
Referee: Alan Welsby (England)

East Wales: M. Richards; Clive Rees, N. D. Butcher, N. J. Shanklin, N. B. Juliff; G. Lawrence, N. A. Lewis; Terry Cobner (capt.), Clive Burgess, B. Lease; J. Watkins, J. Floyd; Graham Price, Bobby Windsor, Charlie Faulkner

Argentina: M. Sansot; D. Beccar Varela, A. Travaglini, A. Rodríguez Jurado (capt.) (G. Beccar Varela), J. Gauweloose; H. Porta, A. Etchegaray; J. Carracedo, R. Mastai, C. Neyra; E. Branca, J. J. Fernández; R. Irañeta, J. Costante, M. Carluccio

2 October 1976

Cardiff RFC	25–29	Argentina
Try: Dudley-Jones 2, Rawlins; Con: G. Davies 2 Pen: G. Davies 3		Try: Gauweloose 2, D.Beccar Varela; Sansot; Con: G.Beccar Varela, Porta; Pen: Porta, Sansot; Drop: Porta

National Stadium, Cardiff
Referee: Kenneth Pattinson (England)

Cardiff: J. Davies; Gerald Davies (capt.), M. Murphy, A. J. Finlayson (Holand), D. Thomas; Gareth Davies, Gareth Edwards; Stuart Lane, B. Dubin-Jones, T. Morgan, I. Robinson, P. Rawlins; Mike Knill, Mike Watkins, Barry Nelmes

Argentina: M. Sansot; D. Beccar Varela, G. Beccar Varela, A. Travaglini, J. Gauweloose, H. Porta, A. Etchegaray (capt.); C. Neyra, R. Mastai, J. Carracedo; E. Branca, J. J. Fernández; F. Insúa, J. Braceras, M. Carluccio (R. Irañeta)

6 October 1976

Aberavon RFC	6–18	Argentina
Pen: Bevan 2		Try: Travaglini; Con: G.Beccar Varela; Pen: G. Beccar Varela 3, Sansot

Port Talbot
Referee: R. C. Quittenton (England)

Aberavon: P. Bessant; R. James, A. Rees, I. Halle, I. Keene; John Bevan, Clive Shell (capt.); O. Alexander, P. Clarke, R. Davies; P. Bell, Billy Mainwaring; Clive Williams, Billy James, B. Lewis

Argentina: M. Alonso; M. Sansot, A. Travaglini, G. Beccar Varela, G. Álvarez; H. Porta (F. González Victorica), A. Etchegaray (capt.); J. Carracedo; R. Sanz, H. Massini; J. J. Fernández, E. Branca; R. Irañeta, J. Costante, F. Insúa

9 October 1976

North and Midlands	24–9	Argentina
Try: Slemen; Con: Hare; Pen: Hare 5 Drop: Horton		Pen: G. Beccar Varela 2, Sansot

Welford Road, Leicester
Referee: P. J. Lillington (England)

North and Midlands Dusty Hare; John Carleton, Paul Dodge, Tony Bond, Mike Slemen; John Horton, Steve Smith; D. Forfar, Tony Neary, Garry Adey; D. Trickey, Bill Beaumont; Fran Cotton (capt.), Peter Wheeler, Colin White

Argentina: M. Alonso; M. Sansot, A. Travaglini (capt.), G. Beccar Varela, J. Gauweloose; F. González Victorica, R. Castagna; H. Massini, R. Mastai, C. Neyra; E. Branca, J. J. Fernández; F. Insúa, J. Costante, R. Irañeta

12 October 1976

West Wales	14–12	Argentina
Try: Evans, Griffiths, Hill; Con: Phillips		Pen: Sansot 2, G. Beccar Varela; Drop: G. Beccar Varela

Stradey Park, Llanelli
Referee: D. H. Burnett (Ireland)

West Wales: Clive Griffiths; Elgan Rees (L. Thomas), P. Phillips, Roy Bergiers, Andy Hill; David Richards, S. Williams; G. Jones, H. Jenkins, Trefor Evans; Phil May, Geoff Wheel; Phil Llewellyn, R. Thomas, Glyn Shaw

Argentina: M. Sansot; D. Beccar Varela, A. Travaglini, G. Beccar Varela, J. Gauweloose; H. Porta, A. Etchegaray (capt.); J. Carracedo, J. Sanz, C. Neyra; J. J. Fernández, E. Branca; M. Carluccio, J. Braceras, A. Risler

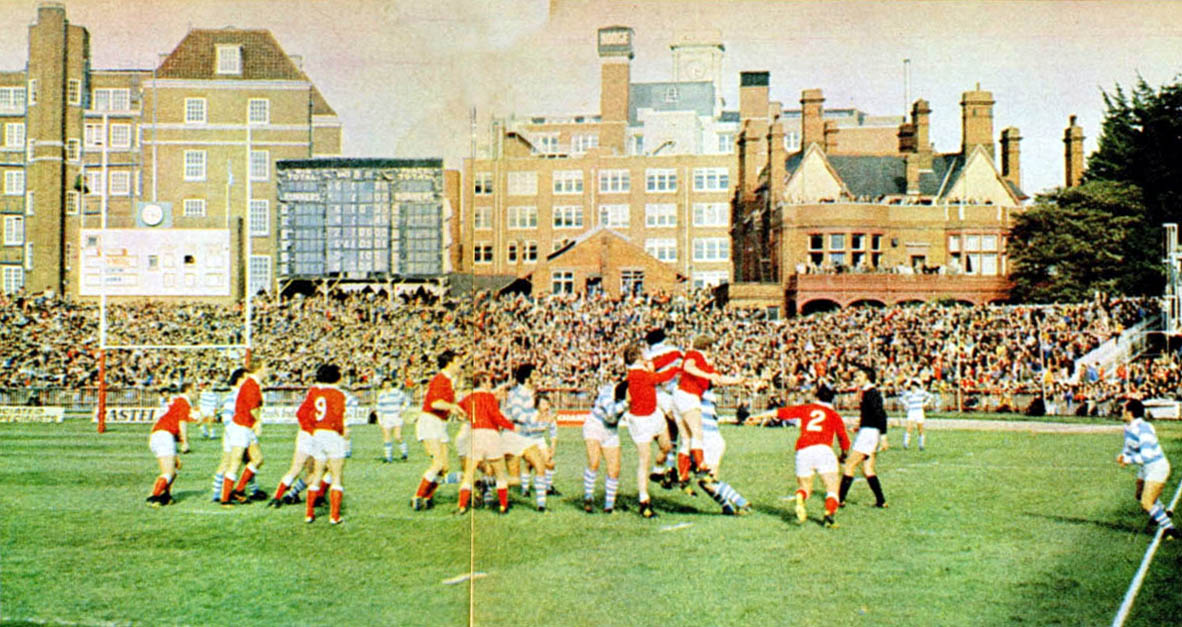
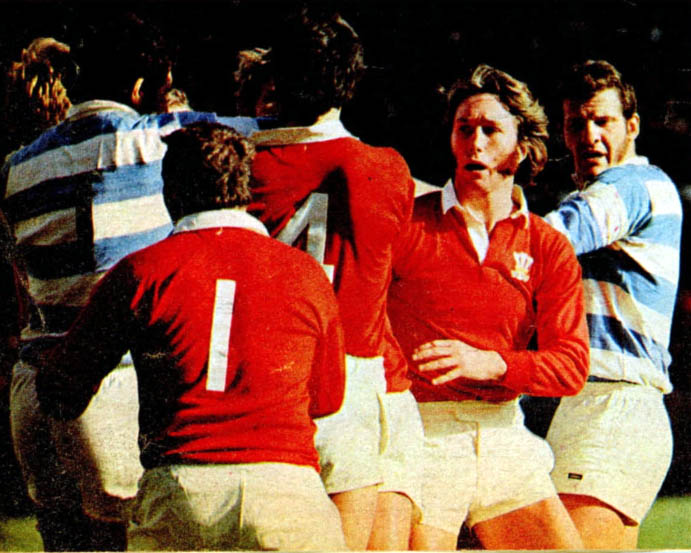
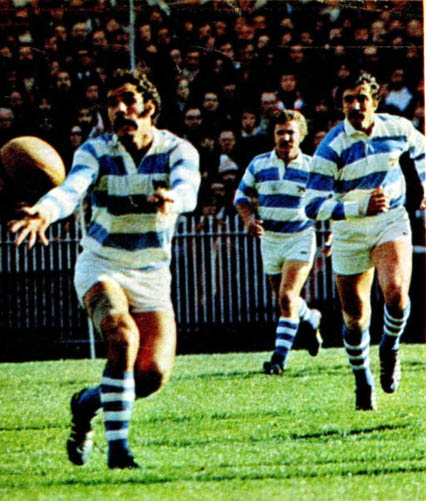
Some moments of the test match at Cardiff Arms Park

16 October 1976

Wales	20–19	Argentina
Try: Davies, Edwards; Pen: Bennett 4		Try: G. Beccar Varela, Gauweloose; Con: Porta; Pen: G. Beccar Varela 2, Porta

Cardiff Arms Park, Cardiff
Attendance: 4,000
Referee: Norman Sanson (Scotland)

Wales
Argentina

Wales XV			Argentina
J. P. R. Williams	FB	15	FB	Martin Sansot
Gerald Davies	W	14	W	Daniel Beccar Varela
Ray Gravell	C	13	C	Alejandro Travaglini
Roy Bergiers	C	12	C	Gonzalo Beccar Varela
J. J. Williams	W	11	W	Jorge Gauweloose
Phil Bennett	FH	10	FH	Hugo Porta
Gareth Edwards	SH	9	SH	Adolfo Etchegaray (capt.)
Derek Quinnell	N8	8	N8	Jorge Carracedo
(capt.) Terry Cobner	F	7	F	Ricardo Mastai
Trefor Evans	F	6	F	Carlos Neyra
Geoff Wheel	L	5	L	Jose Fernandez
Barry Clegg	L	4	L	Eliseo Branca
Charlie Faulkner	P	3	P	Rito Iraneta
Bobby Windsor	H	2	H	Jose Costante
Graham Price	P	1	P	Fernando Insua
		Replacements
Jeff Squire	L	16	H	Jorge Braceras

== Bibliography ==
- Jenkins, Vivian, ed. (1979). Rothmans Rugby Yearbook 1979-80. Queen Anne Press. pp. 47–51. ISBN 0-354-09087-9.
- "Memoria y Balance" (PDF) (in Spanish). Union Argentina de Rugby. November 1976. Archived from the original (PDF) on 8 November 2021.
