= 1975 Wales rugby union tour of Asia =

Summary
P	W	D	L
Total
5	5	0	0
Test match
3	3	0	0
Opponent
P	W	D	L
Hong Kong
1	1	0	0
Japan
2	2	0	0

Tour chronology
- ← 1969 Oceania 1978 Australia →

The 1975 Wales rugby union tour of Asia was a series of matches played in September 1975 by the Wales national rugby union team. No caps were awarded by the Welsh Rugby Union

== Results ==
Scores and results list Wales' points tally first.

Opponent	For	Against	Date	Venue	Status
Hong Kong	57	3	10 September 1975	Hong Kong	Test match
Combined Waseda Un., Kinki Nihon Railway	32	3	15 September 1975	Olympic Stadium, Tokyo	Tour match
Japan B	34	7	18 September 1975	Olympic Stadium, Tokyo	Tour match
Japan	56	12	21 September 1975	Hanazono, Osaka	Test match
Japan	82	6	24 September 1975	Olympic Stadium, Tokyo	Test match

== Touring party ==
- Manager: L. M. Spence
- Assistant manager: John Dawes
- Captain: Mervyn Davies

=== Backs ===
- Phil Bennett
- Roy Bergiers
- John Bevan
- Roger Blyth
- Gerald Davies
- Gareth Edwards
- Steve Fenwick
- Ray Gravell
- Clive Rees
- Clive Shell
- J. J. Williams
- J. P. R. Williams

=== Forwards ===
- Barry Clegg
- Terry Cobner
- Mervyn Davies
- Trefor Evans
- Charlie Faulkner
- Gareth Jenkins
- Barry Llewelyn
- Allan Martin
- Graham Price
- Derek Quinnell
- E. R. Thomas
- Geoff Wheel
- Bobby Windsor
