= List of people associated with Penarth =

The following is a list of prominent and notable people associated with the town of Penarth in South Wales.

== Armed Forces ==
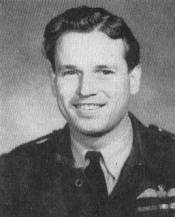
"Dambuster" Wing Commander Guy Gibson, lived in Penarth

- Lieutenant-General Sir Robert Fry is a British Royal Marines general, formerly Commandant General Royal Marines was born in Penarth.
- Patrick Gibbs (1916 – April 2008) was born in Penarth and died aged 92 best remembered as chief film critic of The Daily Telegraph from 1960 to 1986. But his own most dramatic moment came when he was a Royal Air Force Wing Commander based on Malta for three months during the summer of 1942 as a flight commander at the much-bombed but resilient island, which brought his Beaufort torpedo bombers within range of Axis convoys crossing the Mediterranean to Africa. Gibbs was awarded the DSO, DFC and Bar .
- Guy Penrose Gibson RAF (12 August 1918 – 19 September 1944) – leader of the Dambuster raid, recipient of the Victoria Cross, married his wife Eve, herself a Penarthian, at All Saints Church Penarth in 1940 and the couple lived for a time in Archer Road, where there is a commemorative plaque to his memory. Gibson was a keen golfer and a member of the Glamorganshire Golf Club in Lower Penarth.
- Samuel George Pearse (16 July 1897 – 29 August 1919) – was a Sergeant in the Royal Fusiliers and a recipient of the Victoria Cross, the highest and most prestigious award for gallantry in the face of the enemy that can be awarded to British and Commonwealth forces. Pearse was born and educated in Penarth before moving to Australia with his family in 1911 after leaving school.
- Richard William Leslie Wain (5 December 1896 – 20 November 1917) – a Captain in the Tank Corps was also a recipient of the Victoria Cross. He was born and educated in Penarth.

== Entertainment ==
- Lincoln Barrett (born 1979), also known as High Contrast, is a successful drum and bass DJ and producer. Lincoln lives in Penarth.
- Paul 'Legs' Barrett was manager of Shakin' Stevens and the Sunsets for ten years until October 1977 and is well known countrywide as a rock and roll promoter, agent and impresario. He has also managed Jerry Lee Lewis's younger sister Linda Gail Lewis. Paul has lived in Penarth all his life and is married to Lorraine Barrett, the town's Welsh Assembly member.
- Rebecca Evans (born August 1963) the Welsh soprano opera singer from the village of Pontrhydyfen near Neath, now lives in Penarth with her family.
- Mary Glynne (25 January 1895 – 19 September 1954), was a British film actress. She appeared in 24 films between 1919 and 1939. She was born in Penarth and died in London.
- Denys Graham (29 June 1926 – October 2024) – Television and film actor born in Penarth. He has appeared in films such as Zulu, The Dambusters and Dunkirk, also TV shows including Angels, Lovejoy and Rumpole of the Bailey.
- Jemma Griffiths (born 18 June 1975) is a singer-songwriter better known as Jem. She was born in Penarth where she attended Stanwell Comprehensive School and went on to attend Sussex University, obtaining a degree in law. Along with Guy Sigsworth, she wrote the song "Nothing Fails", which was later reworked by Madonna and appeared on her 2003 American Life album.
- Ross Lovegrove (born 1958) – the internationally known industrial designer, best known for his pioneering design work on the Sony Walkman and Apple computers, was born and educated in the town and returns home frequently to visit local family members.
- Martyn Joseph – was born in Penarth and is a Welsh singer-songwriter. In 2004, he won the Best Male Artist Category in the BBC Welsh Music Awards.

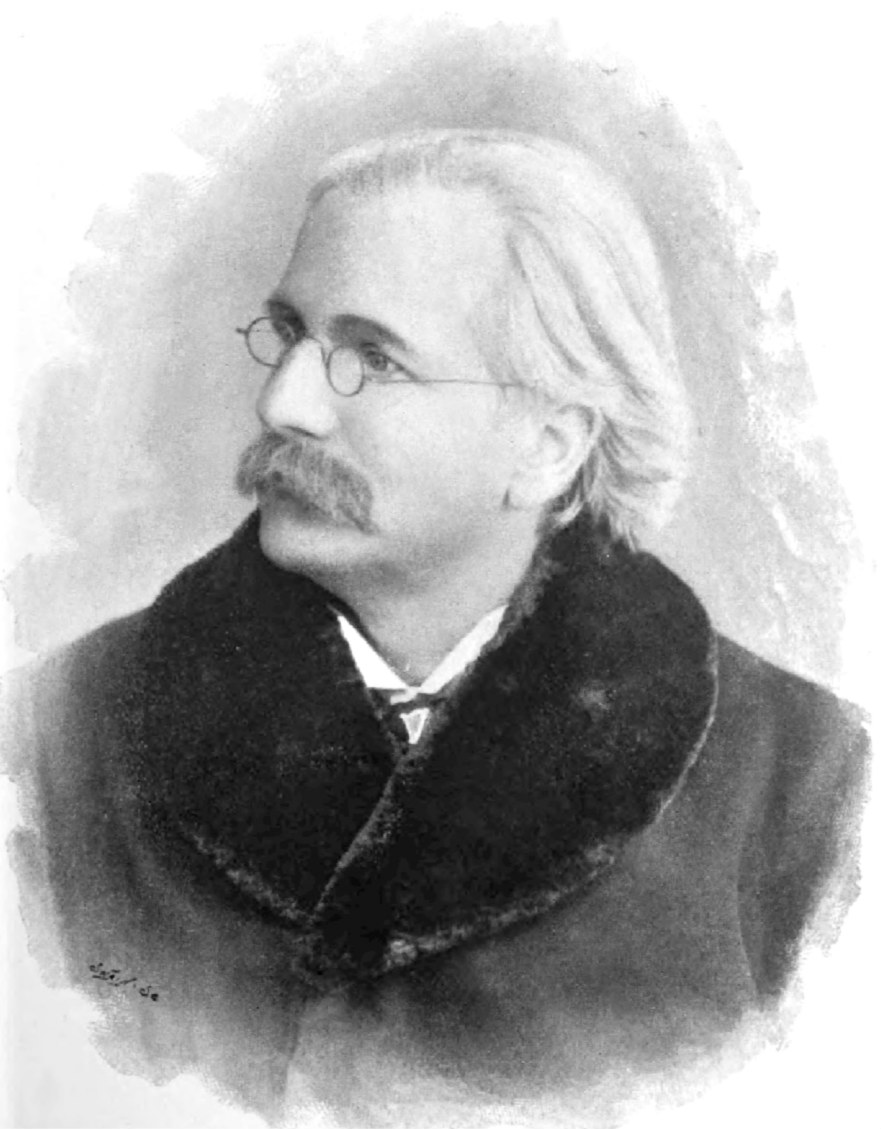
Composer Dr Joseph Parry

- Colin McCormack (December 1941 – 19 June 2004) – Actor and member of the Bristol Old Vic and the Royal Shakespeare Company, famous for his stage, television and film roles over fifty years including Macbeth (1988), The Tempest (1988), Two Gentlemen of Verona (1999) and Julius Caesar (2002). He was also in the RSC's production of A Clockwork Orange (1990). His TV roles were numerous but included Dixon of Dock Green (1955 and 1974), Z Cars (1966), Please, Sir (1970), The Sweeney (1975), The Good Life (1978), Yes Minister (1980), Martin Chuzzlewit (1994), Inspector Morse (1987), Casualty (2000) and Longitude (2000). He appeared in several films the latest ones being Let Him Have It (1991) and First Knight (1995). Colin will probably best be remembered by television audiences for his recurring role as Alan in the 1984 science fiction series Chocky and his 1991 stint playing Kevin Masters in EastEnders. He also tutored at the Guildhall School of Music and Drama, and his students included Ewan McGregor, Alistair McGowan and Daniel Craig. Colin died of cancer aged 63. He was born in Penarth and attended Penarth Grammar School.
- Joseph Parry (21 May 1841 – 17 February 1903) – a Welsh composer and musician, born in Merthyr Tydfil. He is known best as the composer of the haunting Myfanwy, much loved by male voice choirs, and the hymn tune Aberystwyth (most familiar as the tune for "Jesu, Lover of My Soul"). Parry lived most of his later life in Penarth and is buried in St Augustine's churchyard.
- Erin Richards (17 May 1986) An actress who rose to prominence with her role as Barbara Kean in the TV series Gotham.
- Shakin' Stevens – also known as Shaky (born Michael Barratt, 4 March 1948, in Ely, Cardiff) the Platinum selling Welsh rock and roll singer and songwriter, who has the distinction of being one of the top selling UK singles artist of all time, with thirty four Top 40 records and the biggest selling UK male artists during the 1980s, was based in Penarth during the 1960s and early 1970s.
- The Sunsets – Shakin' Stevens's original backing band was formed from mostly Penarth resident musicians, including long serving bassist David 'Batman' Goddard and guitar doyen Cyril 'Cyd' Petherick. The renowned 1950s purist rock and roll band is still based in the town and tours regularly.

== Literature and media ==
- Gillian Clarke was born on 8 June 1937 in Cardiff and is a poet, playwright, editor, broadcaster, lecturer and translator (from Welsh). She was brought up in Cardiff and was educated and lived in Penarth.
- Adrian Goldsworthy (born 1969) is a British historian and military writer. Goldsworthy was educated at Westbourne School, Penarth. Later, after studying ancient and modern history at St John's College, Oxford, he graduated as a D.Phil in ancient military history at Oxford University in 1994, using his doctoral thesis in his first book, The Roman Army at War 100 BC – AD 200. Goldsworthy was a Research Fellow at Cardiff University for two years and has taught in different university departments where he has produced various articles on Greco-Roman warfare.
- Martin Hinds (10 April 1941; Penarth – 1 December 1988) was a scholar of the Middle East and historiographer of early Islam . He co-authored with Patricia Crone the book God's Caliph : Religious Authority in the First Centuries of Islam
- The artist Ray Howard-Jones (1903–1996), who grew up in Penarth, painted scenes showing the preparations for D-Day taking place around Penarth and the Cardiff Docks during World War Two.
- Eric Linklater (8 March 1899 – 7 November 1974) was a successful writer, known for more than 20 novels, as well as short stories, travel writing and autobiography, and military history. Linklater was born in Penarth.
- Denis Alfred Peter Philp (10 November 1920 – 5 February 2006), was a Welsh dramatist and antiques expert, best known for his television series, Collectors' Club. Philp lived in Penarth.
- Frank Roper (12 December 1914 – 3 December 2000) was a British artist and sculptor. He was one of the most prolific post-War artists undertaking commissions for churches and cathedrals in England and Wales. Roper was also a potter and a calligrapher. He was awarded the OBE in 1990 for his services to art. Roper retired to Penarth in 1973 and lived there until his death.
- Richard Short (29 December 1841, St Ives, Cornwall – 16 December 1919) was a Cornish artist who painted many scenes in and around Penarth.
- Alfred Sisley the French Impressionist painter famously stayed in Penarth at 4 Clive Place in 1897. During his time there he married his long-term companion Eugénie Lescouzec in Cardiff Register Office. Sisley created six landscape paintings of the cliffs and coast at Penarth, before making further paintings on the Gower Peninsula. A board commemorating his stay in Penarth has now been erected, close to where he painted an oak-tree on the cliff edge. Sisley's painting of "The Cliffs at Penarth in the evening at low tide" is now in the National Museum of Wales.
- Andrew Phillip Smith (born 1966) is a Welsh writer who has so far specialized in non-fiction in the area of Gnosticism and early Christianity. He grew up in Penarth, and attended the University College of Wales, Swansea. He lived for some time in London and then in rural California and now lives in Dublin with his wife. His published works include The Gospel of Thomas: A new version based on the inner meaning (Ulysses Books, 2002), The Gospel of Philip: annotated & explained (Skylight Paths, 2005), The lost sayings of Jesus: annotated & explained (Skylight Paths 2006), Gnostic Writings on the soul: annotated & explained (Skylight Paths 2007), The Gnostics: History* Traditions* Scriptures* Influence (Watkins Publishing, 2008), A Dictionary of Gnosticism (Quest Publishing 2009), The Lost Teachings of the Cathars (Watkins Publishing 2015, The Secret History of the Gnostics, their scriptures beliefs & traditions (Watkins Publishin 2015) He also runs the small press Bardic Press and has contributed forewords to their books.
- David Sullivan (born 1 February 1949) – the notorious "Private shops" pornography baron, newspaper proprietor and part owner of Birmingham City FC was born and educated in Penarth. He graduated in Economics from Queen Mary College, University of London. Since 1986 he has been the owner of the Daily Sport and Sunday Sport. In 2004, Sullivan was named by the Sunday Times as Britain's 68th richest man, with assets valued at over £500 million.
- Professor Jim Wiegold (15 April 1934 – 4 August 2009) was a Welsh mathematician. He earned a PhD at the University of Manchester in 1958, studying under Bernhard Neumann, and is most notable for his contributions to group theory. Professor Weigold died in Penarth.
- Urien Wiliam (7 November 1929 – 21 October 2006), was a noted Welsh novelist and dramatist. William was born in Barry and lived and died in Penarth.

== Politics and public service ==
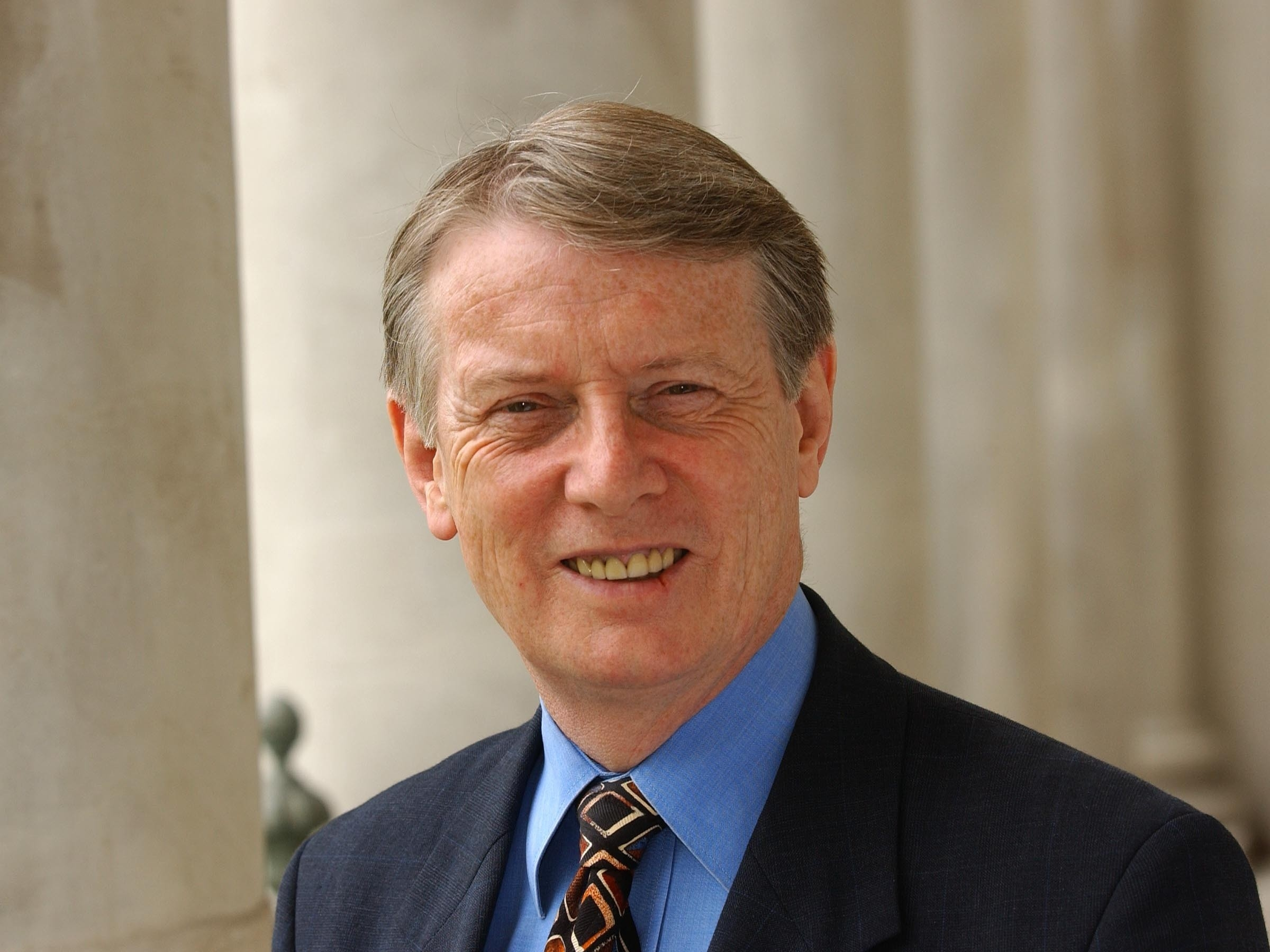
Alun Michael MP

- Emily Rose Bleby (1849–1917) was a temperance reformer. Born in Jamaica, British West Indies, she lived her later years in Penarth where she died.
- Sir Alun Talfan Davies (22 July 1913 – 11 November 2000) was a Welsh politician, lawyer, writer and publisher, the brother of Aneirin Talfan Davies. Davies lived in Penarth all his life and died in the town.
- Gwilym Davies (24 March 1879 – 26 January 1955) was a Welsh Baptist minister, who spent much of his life attempting to further good international relations through supporting the work of the League of Nations and its successor, the United Nations. He also established the Annual World Wireless Message to Children in 1922, and was the first person to broadcast in Welsh, on St David's Day 1923. Davies retired to Penarth and when he died his ashes were scattered in the sea at Lavernock Point.
- John Dixon (born 1951) is a Welsh politician and was Chairman of Plaid Cymru. He stood for Carmarthen West and South Pembrokeshire constituency in the 2007 National Assembly for Wales election. Dixon lived in Penarth and was educated in the town.
- Sir Henry Lewis Guy (15 June 1887 – 20 July 1956) was a leading British mechanical engineer, notable in particular for his work on steam turbine design. Guy was born and educated in Penarth.
- Ralph Hancock (1893–1950) – Queen Elizabeth the Queen Mother's favourite landscape gardener built gardens in the UK in the 1920s, 1930s and 1940s and in the United States in the 1930s. A few are well known; the roof gardens at Derry and Toms in London and the Rockefeller Center in New York, the garden at Twyn-yr-Hydd House in Margam and the rock and water garden he built for Princess Victoria at Coppins, Iver, England. Hancock lived in Penarth for most of his life.
- Sir John Hawkshaw (1811 – 2 June 1891), English engineer, was born in Leeds, Yorkshire and was educated at Leeds Grammar School. Hawkshaw was the architect and builder of Penarth Docks and he settled in the town after it was constructed.
- Harrison Hayter (10 April 1825 – 5 May 1898) was a British engineer, participating in many significant railway construction projects in Britain and many harbour and dock constructions worldwide, including Penarth docks.
- Clive Jenkins (2 May 1926 – 22 September 1999) – the British trade union leader who stated in Who's Who that his whole life was dedicated to "Organising the middle classes", which summed up both his sense of humour and his achievements in the British trade union movement, had a second home in the town.
- Eric Linklater (8 March 1899 – 7 November 1974), founder member and candidate of the National Party of Scotland (predecessor of the SNP), also a writer. Linklater was born in Penarth.
- Constance Maillard (1849–1935) Woman politician and the first female chairman of the Penarth Urban District Council in 1924–25.
- Alun Michael MP (born 22 August 1943) – the Welsh politician, Labour and Co-operative Member of Parliament for Cardiff South and Penarth, and member of the UK's Privy Council lives in the town. He was the Police and Crime Commissioner for South Wales up until 2024.
- Sir Archibald Rowlands (26 December 1892 – 18 August 1953) was a British civil servant. After serving as private secretary to three Secretaries of State for War, he was Permanent Secretary to the Ministry of Air Production during the Second World War. He then worked in India and later acted as a special advisor to Muhammad Ali Jinnah, the Governor-General of Pakistan. Rowlands was born in Penarth and educated at Penarth Grammar School.
- Dr. Wilfred Edward Shewell-Cooper (1900–1982) was a pioneer British organic gardener and pioneer of no dig gardening. He was the author of Soil, Humus and Health (1975). Shewell-Cooper lived in Penarth during the early 20th century.
- John Smith MP (born 1951) – Labour party politician and former Member of Parliament for the Vale of Glamorgan was educated at Penarth County Grammar School. Member of the UK's Defence Select Committee between 2005 – 2007.
- James Pyke Thompson (1846–1897) was an English corn merchant who is best known for his philanthropic work towards the people of Cardiff and Penarth. Born into a wealthy family in Bridgwater, Somerset, Thompson joined his father as director of Spiller & Co., Cardiff, one of the largest milling companies in Britain. Thompson lived in Plymouth Road and built the Turner House Gallery to house his collection of paintings.
- Philip Weekes (born Philip Gordon Weekes in the village of Nantybwch, Monmouthshire 12 June 1920 died Penarth 26 June 2003) was a renowned mining engineer who rose to the head of his profession within the mining industry in Wales and beyond.
- Harriet Windsor-Clive, 13th Baroness Windsor (1797–1869), her Plymouth Estates owned the land where Penarth was developed. She formed the Penarth Harbour Company which developed Penarth Dock and she financed the town's National School.
- Sir Edward Youde (19 June 1924 – 5 December 1986) born in Penarth was a British administrator, diplomat and Sinologist. He served as Governor of Hong Kong between 20 May 1982 and 5 December 1986.

== Sport ==
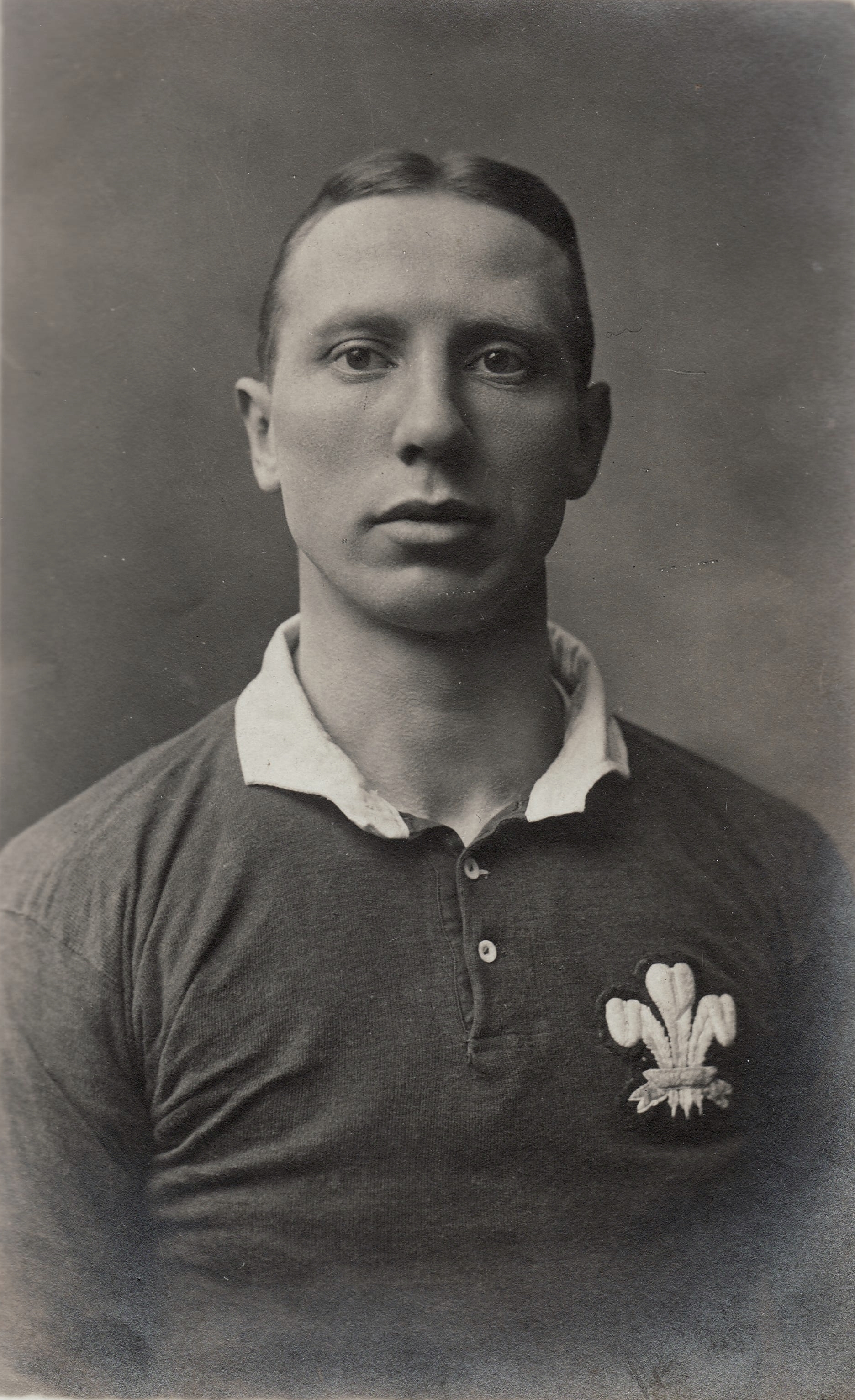
Rugby player Reggie Gibbs

- Peter Aitken (born 30 June 1954) is a former Welsh professional footballer and was born in Penarth.
- Jack Bassett (11 July 1905 – 19 February 1989) was a Welsh international rugby union full back who played club rugby for Penarth RFC. He won 15 caps for Wales and was selected for the 1930 British Lions tour of Australia and New Zealand. He captained the Welsh team on nine occasions.
- William Percy Carpmael (1853 – 27 December 1936) was the founder and first president of the rugby union Barbarian Football Club. Carpmael was born the eldest of eight in Stretham, England. Carpmeal lived in Penarth briefly and chose the town as headquarters of the Barbarian FC.
- James Arthur Clare (1857 – 4 January 1930) was an English-born international rugby union three-quarter who played club rugby for Cardiff Rugby Football Club and international rugby for Wales. He achieved just a single cap, in the second international encounter between Wales and his birth country England. Clare lived in Penarth most of his life while working as a maritime pilot.
- David Davies (born 3 March 1985 in Barry) – the British Commonwealth Games competitor and Olympic silver medalist in the 2008 Beijing 10-kilometre open water swim was educated in Penarth.
- Richard 'Dickie' Garrett (1865 – 17 February 1908) was a Welsh international rugby union player who played club rugby for Penarth and international rugby for Wales. Garrett was a collier by trade, and in 1908 was killed when he was crushed by a coal truck.
- Reggie Gibbs (7 May 1882 – 28 November 1938) was a Welsh international rugby union wing who played club rugby for Penarth and Cardiff. He was capped 16 times for his country and captained his team on one occasion. Gibbs is one of five Welsh players to have scored four tries in a single game.
- Dame Carys Davina ("Tanni") Grey-Thompson (born 26 July 1969 in Cardiff) is a Welsh Paralympian athlete and was educated in Penarth.
- Alan Harrington (17 November 1933 – 23 December 2019) is a former Wales international footballer. Harrington played his entire professional career at Cardiff City, where he is regarded as one of the club's all-time greats.
- Amanda Haswell – the Welsh Commonwealth and British Olympic high diver in the 1960s was born in Penarth and attended Penarth Grammar School.
- Brett Morse (born 11 February 1989) is a British discus athlete who has competed in the world championships, Olympic Games and Commonwealth Games. Currently ranked World No. 8, European No. 4, Commonwealth No. 3 and British No. 1.
- Ieuan Lloyd (born 9 July 1993) is a Welsh swimmer who has competed in both the Olympic and commonwealth games, he is better known as the Maesteg Manatee.
- Austin David George Matthews (3 May 1904 – 29 July 1977) was a cricketer who played for Northamptonshire, Glamorgan and England. Matthews was born in Penarth and played rugby for Penarth RFC.
- James "Jimmy" Nelson (7 January 1901 – 8 October 1965) was a Scottish international footballer who played for Cardiff City and Newcastle United in the 1920s and 1930s and captained the famous Wembley Wizards Scotland side of 1928. Nelson moved to Penarth in later life and eventually became a publican in the town after retiring from football.
- Edith Parnell, in 1929 the 16-year-old schoolgirl was the second person to swim across the Bristol Channel from Penarth to Weston-super-Mare.
- Frankie Prince (born 1 December 1949) is a Welsh former footballer who was born in Penarth.
- Jamie Robinson (born 7 April 1980 in Penarth) is a Welsh rugby union footballer who plays at outside centre for the Cardiff Blues and for Wales. He attended Ysgol Gyfun Gymraeg Glantaf with younger brother Nicky Robinson. He is known for his defence, blistering pace and ability to beat defenders.
- George Albert Rowles (1866 – 12 September 1922) was a Welsh rugby union international halfback who played club rugby for Penarth RFC and Newport RFC. He won a single cap for Wales during the 1892 Home Nations Championship. He was the second player to represent Wales while playing club rugby for Penarth.
- Edward Sweet-Escott (27 July 1879 – 1 July 1956) was a cricketer for Glamorgan and England. He was a right-handed batsman and a right-arm off-break bowler. He was born in Brompton-Ralph and died in Penarth after living in the town for many years.
- Kathleen Thomas, the first person to swim across the Bristol Channel, a 21-year-old woman from Penarth who swam to Weston-super-Mare on 5 September 1927 in 7 hours 20 minutes. In 2007 the achievement was marked by a plaque in seafront in Penarth.
- Edward 'Ted' Vizard (7 June 1889 – 25 December 1973) was a Welsh footballer who became a club manager. He spent almost all his playing career at Bolton Wanderers. Vizard was born in Cogan.
- George Avery Young (June 1866 – 21 January 1900) was an English-born sportsman who played international rugby union for Wales and cricket for Glamorgan. Young lived the latter part of his life in Penarth and died in the town.
- Louis Rees-Zammit (born 2 February 2001), who is a Welsh international rugby union player, was born in Penarth.

== See also ==
- Category:People from Penarth
