= Clive Davis (rugby union) =

Welsh rugby union player

- Born: Clive Enoch Davis; 1949 (69 years) Tredegar Monmouthshire, Wales

Rugby union career
- Position: Second Row & No 8
- Current team: Retired
Senior career
Years	Team	Apps	(Points)
1968–83	Newbridge	Unknown	(Unknown)
International career
Years	Team	Apps	(Points)
1978–81	Wales	3	(4)

Clive Enoch Davis (born September 17, 1949) is a former Welsh international rugby union player.

Davis played his entire career at Newbridge RFC, gaining county, invitational, and international honors while doing so.

Davis made his debut for Newbridge on 16 November 1968 against Cheltenham. He was a mainstay in the club throughout the decade, captaining them for three seasons. It wasn't until the 1977–78 season that Davis made his break onto the international scene. He became Newbridge's first ‘'B'’ international, playing for Wales B against France in Nantes. He was then selected for the annual Barbarians Easter tour. Davis went on to represent the invitational club on eight occasions throughout his career, scoring two tries. The 1978 season ended with Davis being selected for the 1978 Wales rugby union tour of Australia.

Davis represented the Welsh team in 5 games during the tour. He won a cap during the final game of the tour, the 2nd test match played at the Sydney Cricket Ground. The Welsh back row had a different look about it, J. P. R. Williams was on one flank with Stuart Lane, while on the other, Davis took on the No. 8 responsibilities. The match was extensively physical with several brawls breaking out on the field. Wales prop Graham Price broke his jaw. Australia ended up winning the game by 19 points to 17.

Davis kept his place in the Wales squad for the next two seasons but did not get playing opportunities. At the end of the 1979–80 season, he was selected to tour North America with the Welsh XV. During the tour, he played in four games, including the uncapped tests against both the US and Canada.

The 1980–81 season was the Welsh Rugby Union's centenary season. He won his second cap in the first game of the championship, against England at the National Stadium in Cardiff. Wales won the game 21–19 with Davis scoring the only Welsh try of the game, the first time a Newbridge player had scored in a full international. The team that traveled to Murrayfield was unchanged, however, a poor performance saw Scotland run out winners by 18 points to 6. The defeat brought about several changes and ended the international careers of J. P. R. Williams, Steve Fenwick, Brynmor Williams, and Clive Davis.

Davis retired at the end of the 1982–83 season. The season ended with a tour to France representing another invitational team, Crawshays RFC. After retiring, David went on to coach Oakdale, Newbridge and Ebbw Vale.

Test debut Australia vs Wales at Sydney, 17 June 1978
Last Test Scotland vs Wales at Murrayfield, 7 February 1981
