= Les Keen =

Wales international rugby union footballer

- Born: Leslie Keen; 13 November 1954 (age 72) Port Talbot, Wales
- School: Sanfields Comprehensive
- University: Cardiff College of Education

Rugby union career
- Position: Wing
Amateur team(s)
Years	Team	Apps	(Points)
- British Colleges
–	Aberavon RFC		
–	Penarth RFC		
International career
Years	Team	Apps	(Points)
1980	Wales	4	(4)

Leslie "Les" Keen (born 13 November 1954) is an ex-Welsh rugby union international who played for Aberavon RFC during the 1970s and 1980s.

Born and brought up in Port Talbot Keen was educated at Sandfields Comprehensive. He was a left wing and a member of a successful Aberavon Team which included fellow internationals John Bevan, Clive Shell, and his brother-in-law Allan Martin.

A strong runner with a devastating hand-off, Keen was first awarded a Wales "B" cap in 1979 before earning the full honour in 1980 against England at Twickenham in the famous "Paul Ringer" game. Keen played all four home Internationals that season, scoring a try against Scotland at Cardiff Arms Park.

Keen was a schoolteacher at Cwrt Sart Comprehensive, Briton Ferry and the Ridings High School, Winterbourne.
