= Staff Jones =

British Lions & Wales international rugby union player

- Born: Stephen Thomas Jones; 4 January 1959 (age 67) Ynysybwl, Wales
- Height: 180 cm (5 ft 11 in)
- Weight: 100 kg (15 st 10 lb; 220 lb)
- School: Mill Street Comprehensive

Rugby union career
- Position: Prop
Amateur team(s)
Years	Team	Apps	(Points)
- ynysybwll RFC
–	Pontypool RFC 1978 to 1993		
–	Barbarian F.C.		
International career
Years	Team	Apps	(Points)
1983–1988	Wales	10	(4)
1983	British & Irish Lions	3	(0)

Stephen Thomas "Staff" Jones (born 4 January 1959) is a former Wales rugby union international from Ynysybwl. A loosehead prop forward product of Ynysybwl RFC, before making 408 appearances for Pontypool RFC in the 1980s. He was often in partnership with Steve Jones and Graham Price to form a formidable front row partnership coached by Ray Prosser.

Jones scored a try on his debut for Wales against Scotland at Murryfield in 1983, joining other Pontypool players Bobby Windsor, Terry Cobner and Graham Price who also scored tries on their international debuts.

In 1983 he toured New Zealand with the British and Irish Lions, playing in 13 games including the last three Tests after Ian Stephens was injured. After recovering from a serious knee injury sustained in 1986, he was part of the Welsh Triple Crown winning side in 1988.

He was also a regular for the Monmouthshire County team.
