= Barry Clegg =

Barry Clegg may refer to:

- Barry Clegg (rugby union) (born 1951), Welsh rugby union player
- Barry Clegg, fictional character played by Bernard Wrigley on Emmerdale
