= Steve Jones (rugby union, born 1951) =

Wales international rugby union player

Stephen Jones
- Born: Stephen Paul Jones; 19 October 1951
- Died: 9 September 2007 (aged 55) Pontypool
- Height: 1.75 m (5 ft 9 in)
- Weight: 88 kg (13 st 12 lb)

Rugby union career
- Position: Hooker
Amateur team(s)
Years	Team	Apps	(Points)
?	Pontypool RFC	400	
1976–1978	Newport RFC	55	
1978–?	Pontypool RFC		
International career
Years	Team	Apps	(Points)
1980	Wales XV	1	
Coaching career
- Years: Team
- 1996–1998: Newport RFC
- 1999–2005: Pontypool RFC
- ?: Cwmbran RFC
- 2005: Newbridge RFC

Steve "Junna" Jones (19 October 1951 – 9 September 2007) was a Welsh rugby union hooker, who played club rugby for Pontypool RFC and Newport RFC in the 1970s and 80s. He often played in a front row partnership with Staff Jones and Graham Price at Pontypool RFC and was part of the 1983 Pontypool side to win the Schweppes Cup. Although he toured with a Welsh XV to Canada in 1980, the game did not grant the Welsh players any caps.

Jones learnt his rugby under the tutelage of Laurie Daniel who was a former Welsh international who played for Pontypool and Newport. He later turned to coaching and in the 1996/97 season became the first full-time coach of Newport.

In 1999, Jones became head coach at Pontypool and revitalised the club, signing experienced players such as Byron Hayward, Mark Jones and Kuli Faletau. Steve coached Pontypool to second place in the Welsh Division 1 in season 2001/2. In 2002/3 he coached Pontypool to the league championship, losing only 4 games in the process.

In September 2005, he left Pontypool RFC to take up the coaching role at Newbridge.

Jones died suddenly on 9 September 2007 aged 55.

A memorial match between Newbridge legends and Pontypool legends was played on Thursday 27 December 2007. The game attracted a crowd of around 3,000 with famous former players such as Eddie Butler, David Bishop and Byron Hayward all taking part. Newbridge won the match 26–17.
