= Ray Prosser =

British Lions & Wales international rugby union footballer (1927–2020)

- Born: Thomas Raymond Prosser; 2 March 1927 Pontypool, Torfaen, Wales
- Died: 22 November 2020 (aged 93)
- Height: 6 ft 0 in (1.83 m)
- Weight: 15 st 4 lb (97 kg)
- School: George Street School, Pontypool

Rugby union career
- Position: Prop
Amateur team(s)
Years	Team	Apps	(Points)
- Pontypool United
- Pontypool RFC
1957–58	Barbarian F.C.		
- Monmouthshire
International career
Years	Team	Apps	(Points)
1956–1961	Wales	22	(3)
1959	British Lions	1	(0)
Coaching career
- Years: Team
- 1969–1987: Pontypool RFC

Thomas Raymond Prosser (2 March 1927 – 22 November 2020) was a Welsh international rugby union prop who played club rugby for Pontypool and was capped 22 times for Wales. Prosser also represented the British Lions in their 1959 tour of Australia and New Zealand, and played invitational rugby for the Barbarians. He is often remembered more for his coaching of an extremely successful Pontypool side during the 1970s and 1980s.

Prosser died on 22 November 2020, at the age of 93.

== Rugby playing career ==
Prosser played much of his club rugby for Pontypool, whom he joined in the late 1950s. At club level, he was placed mainly in the second row, but later switched to the front row during his international career. Prosser was an enthusiastic student of rugby and believed in regular playing and training. His playing style was robust and aggressive, whose work rate in the scrum and mauls was tireless. Prosser was often seen as over-vigorous, if not dirty, in some aspects of his play; especially in line outs where he would sometimes use his arms illegally on his opposite jumper.

Prosser was first selected for Wales during the 1956 Five Nations Championship, replacing Neath's Courtney Meredith in a game against Scotland. Under the captaincy of Cliff Morgan, Wales won the game 9-3, but Prosser lost his place to Meredith in the next game of the tournament in Ireland. After Wales lost the Welsh game against Ireland, Prosser was back in favour with the selectors and was part of the team that beat France in the last game of the competition. The victory over the French gave Wales the Championship trophy, making Prosser a Five Nations winning player.

During the 1957 Five Nations Championship, Prosser was rewarded with a position in the Welsh squad that would see him represent his country in the competition for the next three years without missing a game. It was during the 1957 campaign that Prosser scored his only international points, when he scored a try in a win over France. As well as representing Wales over six Five Nations Championships, Prosser faced two touring Southern Hemisphere teams; Australia in 1958 and South Africa in 1960.

In 1959, Prosser was one of nine Welsh players to be selected to play in Ronnie Dawson's British Lions team when they toured Australia and New Zealand. Prosser was not a natural tourist, he had a fear of flying and was also homesick during the long five-month tour. He also suffered an injury early in the tour, but after his recovery, he played with his normal good form, impressing in the game against North Auckland. Prosser was chosen to play in the final test against New Zealand, which the Lions won.

=== International matches played ===
Wales

- Australia 1958
- England 1957, 1958, 1959, 1960
- France 1956, 1957, 1958, 1959, 1960, 1961
- Ireland 1957, 1958, 1959, 1960, 1961
- Scotland 1956, 1957, 1958, 1959, 1960
- South Africa 1960

British Lions

- New Zealand 1959

== Coaching career ==
Prosser was a leading committee man at Pontypool Rugby Club and after retiring from playing rugby was given the role of coaching the first team in 1969. Prosser brought the same commitment he practiced in his own personal fitness and training into his coaching techniques. His methods were revolutionary, producing one of the strongest Pontypool teams in the club's history. During Prosser's time at Pontypool, he oversaw the 'Pontypool Front Row', made up of Graham Price, Bobby Windsor and Charlie Faulkner, the three players represented Wales on 19 occasions. The players credited Prosser's commitment to fitness as a major factor in their rugby development. Prosser coached the Pontypool first team for 18 years until 1987, during which they were unofficial Welsh club champions on five occasions including a hat trick between 1983–1986.

== Bibliography ==
- Billot, John (1974). Springboks in Wales. Ferndale: Ron Jones Publications.
- Godwin, Terry (1984). The International Rugby Championship 1883-1983. London: Willows Books. ISBN 0-00-218060-X.
- Griffiths, John (1987). The Phoenix Book of International Rugby Records. London: Phoenix House. ISBN 0-460-07003-7.
- Smith, David; Williams, Gareth (1980). Fields of Praise: The Official History of The Welsh Rugby Union. Cardiff: University of Wales Press. ISBN 0-7083-0766-3.
- Thomas, Wayne (1979). A Century of Welsh Rugby Players. Ansells Ltd.
