= Bleddyn Taylor =

Wales international rugby union footballer

- Born: Bleddyn Taylor; 17 January 1959 (age 67) Bangor, Gwynedd, Wales
- Height: 5 ft 8 in (173 cm)
- Weight: 14 st 7 lb (203 lb; 92 kg)
- School: Gowerton Grammar School

Rugby union career
- Position: Wing
Senior career
Years	Team	Apps	(Points)
1976	Pontypool		
1976-?	Neath		
?-?	Pontypool		
?-?	Llanelli		
1986–1993	Swansea	172	(351)
1993-1996	Pontypool		
International career
Years	Team	Apps	(Points)
- Wales
- Barbarian Rugby Club

Bleddyn Taylor (born 17 January 1959) was a Welsh rugby union player who played club rugby for Swansea RFC, Pontypool RFC, Neath RFC, Llanelli RFC, and Dunvant RFC. He also represented Wales A, Wales Sevens, and the Barbarians.

== Club career ==
Taylor started his career at Pontypool RFC but soon joined Neath RFC at 17 years of age in 1976, as an outside half. He later rejoined Pontypool as a wing, where under the coaching of Ray Prosser, he achieved cult figure status in the Eastern Valley of Monmouthshire, scoring the winning try, when giants of the club game Pontypool lifted their only Welsh Cup in 1983 with an 18–6 victory over Swansea. The wing then moved to the All Whites after a brief stint with Llanelli where in 1990 he topped the Welsh Premier Division try-scoring charts. He later became player-coach during the rise of Dunvant through the divisions. He is now a director of Elite Maintenance Solutions, based in Llanelli.

- Wales 'A'
- 1986 Wales Sevens
- 1990/91 Wales (World Cup Squad)
- Barbarians
