= John Richardson (rugby union) =

- Full name: Stanley John Richardson
- Born: 1 April 1947 Blaencwm, Wales
- Died: 5 December 2019 (aged 72) Wick, Wales

Rugby union career
- Position: Prop
International career
Years	Team	Apps	(Points)
1978–79	Wales	2	(0)

Stanley John Richardson (1 April 1947 – 5 December 2019) was a Welsh rugby union international.

Richardson was born in the village of Blaencwm and attended Treherbert Secondary Modern School.

A prop, Richardson earned two Test caps for Wales. The Aberavon player was selected on the 1978 tour of Australia and in the second Test at the Sydney Cricket Ground came on as a substitute prop. He replaced Graham Price, who had suffered a jaw broken from a punch by Wallaby Steve Finnane. His other appearance, which he started, was against England in the last round of the 1979 Five Nations, a resounding win which secured Wales the championship and Triple Crown.

== See also ==
- List of Wales national rugby union players
