= Pat Daniels (rugby union) =

Welsh rugby union player (born 1957)

- Full name: Patrick Charles Thomas Daniels
- Born: 15 March 1957 (age 69) Cardiff, Wales

Rugby union career
- Position: Centre / Winger
International career
Years	Team	Apps	(Points)
1981–82	Wales	2	(0)

Patrick Charles Thomas Daniels (born 15 March 1957) is a Welsh former rugby union international.

Daniels was born in Cardiff and educated at Millfield School, which had also produced his Wales predecessors Gareth Edwards and J. P. R. Williams. He played with Glamorgan Wanderers early in his career.

The Welsh Rugby Writers' Association named Daniels as most country's most promising player in 1978 and he was on the Wales squad for that year's tour of Australia. His first Test cap didn't come until Australia's reciprocal tour in 1981, as a centre in Wales' win over the visitors in Cardiff. He earned one further cap in a loss to Ireland at Lansdowne Road in the 1982 Five Nations Championship. He played 143 games for Cardiff RFC and scored 71 tries.

== See also ==
- List of Wales national rugby union players
