= George Rowles =

Wales international rugby union footballer

- Born: George Albert Rowles; 16 December 1865 Pontypool, Torfaen, Wales
- Died: 12 September 1922 (aged 56) Cadoxton, Neath Port Talbot, Wales
- Occupation(s): boiler maker carpenter

Rugby union career
- Position: Half-back
Amateur team(s)
Years	Team	Apps	(Points)
- Penarth RFC
–	Gloucestershire		
International career
Years	Team	Apps	(Points)
1892	Wales	1	(0)

George Albert Rowles (16 December 1865 – 12 September 1922) was a Welsh rugby union international halfback who played club rugby for Penarth and Cardiff . He won a single cap for Wales during the 1892 Home Nations Championship. He was the second player to represent Wales while playing club rugby for Penarth, after Dickie Garrett.

== Rugby career ==
Rowles had played for Penarth for several years before his international selection in 1892, he was senior team captain during the 1885/86 season, and is recorded as being a member of the Penarth team that won the Cardiff District Cup in 1888. Rowles won his only Welsh cap when he was chosen to partner Newport's Percy Phillips in the opening game of the 1892 Home Nations Championship against England. The preferred halfback partnership for Wales were the Swansea pairing of Evan and David James, but with the James brothers unavailable, Rowles was given his opportunity. Under the captaincy of Arthur 'Monkey' Gould, Wales were outclassed by England who won by three goals and a try to nil. The next match the James brother were brought back in and Rowles and Phillips lost their places; though Phillips would represent his country on a further five occasions, Rowles never played for Wales again.

=== International matches played ===
Wales

- England 1892

== Bibliography ==
- Godwin, Terry (1984). The International Rugby Championship 1883-1983. London: Willows Books. ISBN 0-00-218060-X.
- Griffiths, John (1987). The Phoenix Book of International Rugby Records. London: Phoenix House. ISBN 0-460-07003-7.
- Smith, David; Williams, Gareth (1980). Fields of Praise: The Official History of The Welsh Rugby Union. Cardiff: University of Wales Press. ISBN 0-7083-0766-3.
