= Billy Hullin =

Wales international rugby union footballer

- Born: William Gwyn Hullin; 2 January 1942 Loughor, Wales
- Died: 3 October 2012 (aged 70)
- Height: 5 ft 9 in (1.75 m)
- Weight: 77 kg (12 st 2 lb)
- School: Dynevor Grammar
- Occupation: Bank Manager

Rugby union career
- Position: Scrum-half
Amateur team(s)
Years	Team	Apps	(Points)
?-1960	Mumbles RFC		
1960-1962	Aberavon RFC		
1962-1963	Swansea RFC		
1963-1969	Cardiff RFC		
1970-1976	London Welsh RFC		
1966-1969	Barbarian F.C.		
–	Surrey		
–	London Counties		
International career
Years	Team	Apps	(Points)
1967	Wales	7	(0)

William Gwyn Hullin (2 January 1942 - 3 October 2012) was a Welsh international rugby union scrum-half who played club rugby for Cardiff and London Welsh. He represented the Barbarians and played county rugby for Surrey and the London Counties. Hullin was capped only once for Wales, being unfortunate to be playing at the same time as Gareth Edwards, one of the greatest scrum-halves in world rugby. Despite his lack of international caps, he was a regular first team club player, and toured overseas, with Cardiff, London Welsh and the Barbarians. He was also a successful Sevens player, finishing in the winning team in both the Snelling Sevens and the Middlesex Sevens.

== Rugby career ==
Born in the town of Loughor, in Swansea, Hullin played rugby as a boy, representing his school Dynevor Grammar, and progressed to play for the Wales Secondary Schools team. As a senior Hullin played for Mumbles before switching to Aberavon, where he was part of the team that helped the club win the unofficial Western Mail Championship for the only time. He spent a brief season at Swansea RFC before being selected by Welsh rivals Cardiff in the 1963/64 season. By the following season he was a first team regular, playing in 33 matches and scoring 12 tries. In the 1966/67 side he was made vice-captain of the senior team under Keith Rowlands.

Hullin's most notable game was for Cardiff occurred on 5 November 1966 when he was part of the team that faced John Thornett's touring Australian team. Cardiff won the match 14 - 8, their fourth successive win over the Australian national side. Hullin was influential throughout, scoring the match-winner after out-smarting his opposite number Ken Catchpole, scoring a try and a drop goal. He also made the break for Ken Jones to score a try. The 1966/67 season also saw Hullin break into the Wales squad when he was selected for the Welsh opener of the 1967 Five Nations Championship, played away against Scotland. Hullin was paired at half-back, with his Cardiff teammate and fellow international debutant, Barry John. Despite some excellent players in the team, the Welsh play was unimaginative, often negative, and they lost 11–5. Hullin was dropped the next game and never represented Wales again. Hullin continued to represent Cardiff and was also given his first invite to represent invitational tourists, the Barbarians, that same season. Hullin left Cardiff at the end of the 1968/69 season. He made a total of 152 appearances over 6 seasons scoring 43 tries.

The 1968/69 season ended with the third Barbarians overseas tour. Hullin's last act as a Cardiff RFC representative, was to tour with fellow Cardiff teammate John O'Shea. The African tour took in six matches from 10 to 26 May 1969. A different member of the touring side was selected to act as team captain for each of the games, and Hullin was given the honour of leading the team out for the encounter against the South African Barbarians. The South Africans won 23–11.

At the age of 28, Hullin's career in banking had taken him to London, and there he was welcomed into Welsh exiles team, London Welsh. Described as a fine strategist, he spent seven years at the club. In 1972 Hullin was part of the London Welsh team to undertake their first overseas tour, to Ceylon. The team, containing several Welsh internationals, played six matches, winning them all.

=== Rugby sevens ===
Hullin was also a regular Sevens player for Cardiff, and represented them in 10 tournaments. Edwards never played Sevens for Cardiff, and Hullin was rewarded with two Snelling Sevens title wins with the Blues in 1966 and 1969. It was a late try from Hullin in the final against Llanelli in the 1969 final that gave Cardiff the title. He continued his association with Sevens rugby when he switched to London Welsh, where he played a crucial role in the team's success in the Middlesex Sevens. On 10 May 1975 he was captain of the Welsh Presidents in the Ulster Invitation Centenary Sevens at Ravenhill in Belfast.

== Bibliography ==
- Davies, D.E. (1975). Cardiff Rugby Club, History and Statistics 1876-1975. Risca: The Starling Press. ISBN 0-9504421-0-0.
- Godwin, Terry (1984). The International Rugby Championship 1883-1983. London: Willows Books. ISBN 0-00-218060-X.
- Jenkins, John M.; et al. (1991). Who's Who of Welsh International Rugby Players. Wrexham: Bridge Books. ISBN 1-872424-10-4.
- Jones, Stephen; Paul Beken (1985). Dragon in Exile, The Centenary History of London Welsh R.F.C. London: Springwood Books. ISBN 0-86254-125-5.
- Smith, David; Williams, Gareth (1980). Fields of Praise: The Official History of The Welsh Rugby Union. Cardiff: University of Wales Press. ISBN 0-7083-0766-3.
- Starmer-Smith, Nigel (1977). The Barbarians. Macdonald & Jane's Publishers. ISBN 0-86007-552-4.
