= Frank Andrews (rugby) =

Wales international rugby union & league footballer

Personal information
- Full name: Francis Andrews
- Born: 14 February 1886 Ross-on-Wye, England
- Died: 22 November 1944 (aged 58) Leeds, England

Playing information

Rugby union
- Position: Back row
Club
Years	Team	Pld	T	G	FG	P
≤1912–≥13	Pontypool RFC
Representative
Years	Team	Pld	T	G	FG	P
1912–13	Wales	4	0	0	0	0

Rugby league
Club
Years	Team	Pld	T	G	FG	P
1913–14	Hunslet	16	0	0	0	0

Frank Andrews (14 February 1886 – 22 November 1944) was an English-born Welsh rugby union, and professional rugby league footballer who played in the 1910s. He played representative level rugby union (RU) for Wales, and at club level for Pontypool RFC, as a back row, i.e. flanker or number eight, and club level rugby league (RL) for Hunslet.

== Background ==
Frank Andrews was born in Ross-on-Wye, Herefordshire, and he died aged 58 in Leeds, West Riding of Yorkshire, England.

== International honours ==
Frank Andrews won caps for Wales (RU) while at Pontypool RFC in 1912 against South Africa, and in 1913 against England, Scotland, and Ireland.
