= Aled Jenkins =

Welsh rugby union footballer

- Born: Aled Jenkins; 22 April 1990 (age 36) Swansea, Wales
- Height: 185 cm (6 ft 1 in)
- Weight: 90 kg (14 st 2 lb)
- School: Ysgol Gyfun Gŵyr

Rugby union career
- Position: Centre
- Current team: Ospreys
Senior career
Years	Team	Apps	(Points)
2014-2016	Ospreys	9	(0)
–	Ealing Trailfinders	17	(35)
- Correct as of 11 October 2015

Aled Jenkins (born 22 April 1990) is a Welsh rugby union player who plays for Ospreys regional team as a centre.

Jenkins made his debut for the Ospreys regional team in 2014 having previously played for Aberavon RFC, Bridgend Ravens, Mumbles RFC and Swansea RFC. Aled also gained international status by playing for Wales 7s.

He is the son of former Swansea RFC player, Gareth Jenkins.
