= Ray Cheney =

Welsh rugby union footballer

Ray Cheney is a retired rugby union player and sportsman from Wales.

== Early years ==
Ray was born in Porth in the Rhondda. He showed exceptional all round sporting abilities and played football at Ton Pentre for Ton Pentre F.C. He also played Welsh Youth soccer, winning an international youth cap at centre forward and attracted the attention of Tottenham Hotspur FC.

National Service was spent in the RAF, where he was able to represent the RAF at rugby.

== Rugby career ==
On return to civilian life Ray joined Pontypool RFC in Monmouthshire, setting a club record at the time of 169 points and playing against a touring Springboks and maintained a position within the Welsh Reserves.

Moving to local rivals Newport RFC during the 1962/3 season and making his club debut against Llanelli RFC in March '63 he was soon scoring heavily again and amassed 40 points in 11 games. The visiting 1963 All Blacks side was beaten by Newport with Ray hitting the cross bar with an attempted drop goal. By the end of his first full season at the club Ray again set a club record, amassing 171 points during the 63/4 season. In the 64/5 season he surpassed that, attaining 224 points, passing his century in just 15 games.

Ray developed a 'round the corner' deadball kicking style for place kicks, one of the pioneers of this new style at the time.

Ray was in the Welsh Reserves, at full back, some 23 times.

He joined Cardiff RFC, running out 69 times and playing in the side that beat Australia in 1966.

He also represented both Crawshays RFC and Monmouthshire.

He also played cricket for Monmouthshire County Cricket Club.
