= Mumbles RFC =

Welsh rugby union club, based in Mumbles

(Wales) Mumbles RFC
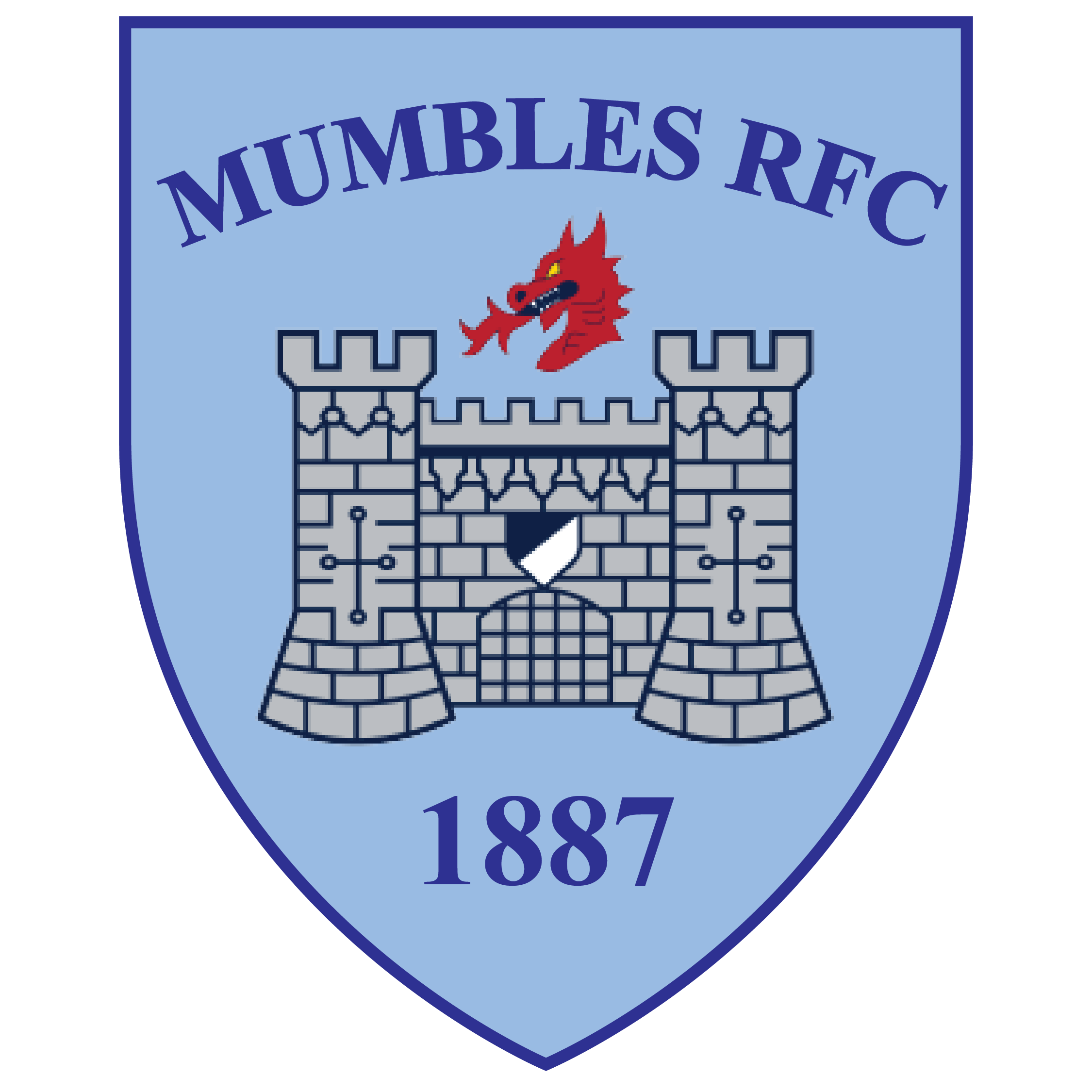
- Badge of Mumbles RFC
- Full name: Mumbles Rugby Football Club
- Founded: 1887
- Location: Mumbles, Wales
- Ground: Underhill Park (Capacity: Standing: Approx 500)
- Coach: Richard Thomas (First team coach)
- League: WRU Division Two West Central
1st kit	2nd kit

Official website
- www.mumblesrfc.com

Mumbles Rugby Football Club is a Welsh rugby union team based in Mumbles, Swansea, south Wales. Mumbles RFC is a member of the Welsh Rugby Union, and is a feeder club for the Ospreys. They compete in the WRU Division Two West, the fifth tier of rugby in Wales.

== Club history ==
Mumbles RFC was founded in 1887 and over the years has produced a large number of rugby players. Many have played at a higher level with neighbouring first-class teams. Their best-known rugby product is Geoff Wheel, who captained Swansea RFC and was the cornerstone of the Welsh pack in the successful national side of the 1970s.

Mumbles RFC has established a reputation for hosting touring rugby teams from all over the world. The first team has also toured other countries, including England, Ireland, Europe, the United States, and Canada.

== The Clubhouse ==
On November 10, 2014, Mumbles RFC were granted planning permission by Swansea council to build a clubhouse next to Underhill Park. Traditionally Mumbles RFC clubhouse has a waterfront location on Swansea bay about five miles from Swansea City centre. The ground is nearby in Underhill Park. Mumbles RFC clubhouse has a wide range of rugby memorabilia.

== Glory days 2012-present ==
At the end of the 2012–13 season Mumbles RFC were crowned champions of the WRU Division Three West, gaining promotion to the WRU Division Two West. After their first campaign in the 2013-14 WRU Division Two West Mumbles finished mid table. Throughout the 2013–14 season plans of a re-organisation of the WRU leagues had been submitted, ready for the start of the 2014–15 season. The WRU voted that Mumbles should play the 2014–15 season in the newly formed Division One West Central, only three levels below the Pro14.

Mumbles recent success has seen them gain a close relationship with Swansea RFC and Ospreys. Several Mumbles players have a dual contract with Swansea and many go on to play for the Ospreys, most recently Aled Jenkins. Because of the relationship between the clubs they often play friendlies against each other, the last time the clubs met it finished 14 - 55 to Swansea in front of a bumper crowd at Underhill Park.

== Rivalries ==
The club has a fierce rivalry with South Gower RFC.

== Notable past players ==
- (Wales) Billy Hullin (1 cap, while at Cardiff)
- (Wales) Geoff Wheel ( (Wales) Swansea)
- (Wales) Ben Lewis ( (Wales) Ospreys)
- (Wales) Sam Lewis ( (Wales) Ospreys)
- (Wales) (Scotland) Kieran Murphy ( (Wales) Scarlets, (France) Brive)
- (Wales) Aled Jenkins ( (Wales) Ospreys)
- (Republic of Ireland) Rhys Ruddock ( (Republic of Ireland) Leinster)

1972 Roger Davies. Full Back for the Scarlets (Llanelli RFC) when they beat the All Blacks.

== Club honours ==
- 2006/07 WRU Division Three South West - Champions
- 2012/13 WRU Division Three South West - Champions
- 2013/14 WRU Division Two West - Promoted
