= Roger Addison =

Welsh rugby union footballer

- Born: Roger Addison; 1945 Pontypool, Wales
- Died: March 2010 (aged 65) Cardiff, Wales

Rugby union career
Senior career
| Years | Team | Apps | (Points) |
- Pontypool RFC

Roger Addison was a Welsh rugby union player. A prop forward, he represented Wales at youth level and played club rugby for Pontypool RFC. He suffered a serious neck injury during a match in 1966 that left him paralysed. He lived in hospital for more than 40 years after the incident.

== Early life ==
Addison grew up in Trevethin, a suburb of Pontypool. He had five sisters and one brother. His father, James, was also a rugby player and played for Pontypool RFC and Newport RFC. Addison attended Twmpath Secondary School.

== Career ==
Addison began his career with Pontypool RFC as a prop and represented Wales at youth level in a 9–6 victory against France in March 1964. He made his senior debut for Pontypool in the same month, as his side defeated Oxford 6–0. In a match against Rugby Lions at William Webb Ellis Road on 5 November 1966 Addison, aged 21, broke his neck in a scrum collapse 15 minutes into the game and was paralysed from the neck down. As a result of the injury, Addison swallowed a piece of chewing gum that became stuck in his throat. Club doctor John O'Hanlon performed an emergency tracheotomy on Addison on the pitch.

At the time of his injury, Addison had made 79 appearances for Pontypool and scored seven tries.

== Later life ==
After the incident, Addison was taken to Stoke Mandeville Hospital where he was diagnosed with quadriplegia as a result of his injuries. Doctors initially feared that he would only survive for three weeks but he lived in hospital for the following 44 years of his life during which representatives of Pontypool RFC visited him regularly. Addison died in March 2010 aged 65. He spent several years at Stoke Mandeville before he was moved to Rookwood Hospital in Cardiff in order to be closer to his family. He was transferred to the University Hospital of Wales in 2005 where he died five years later at the age of 65.
