= Hemi Taylor =

Wales international rugby union player

- Born: Hemi Takatou Taylor; 17 December 1963 (age 62) Morrinsville, New Zealand
- Height: 188 cm (6 ft 2 in)
- Weight: 92 kg (14 st 7 lb)
- Notable relative: Danielle Drady (cousin)

Rugby union career
- Position: Flanker
Amateur team(s)
| Years | Team | Apps | (Points) |
- Newbridge
| – | Cardiff RFC | | |
| – | Barbarian F.C. | | |
| – | Penarth RFC | | |
| – | Aberaeron RFC | | |
International career
| Years | Team | Apps | (Points) |
| 1994–1996 | Wales | 24 | (25) |

Hemi Takatou Taylor (born 17 December 1963) is a former international Wales rugby union player. A back row forward, he was part of the Wales squad for the 1995 Rugby World Cup. He played 123 games for Cardiff between 1992 and 1998 and scored 14 tries including a period as club captain. He is a cousin of former Australian squash player Danielle Drady.
