= Scott Matthews (rugby union) =

Welsh rugby union player

- Born: Scott Matthews; 8 February 1994 (age 32) Cardiff, Wales
- Height: 176 cm (5 ft 9 in)
- Weight: 98 kg (15 st 6 lb)

Rugby union career
- Current team: Pontypool RFC
Senior career
Years	Team	Apps	(Points)
2013-	NG Dragons	3	(0)
2018-	Pontypool RFC	112	(285)
- Correct as of 27 August 2025
International career
Years	Team	Apps	(Points)
- Wales U20

Scott Matthews (born 8 February 1994) is a Welsh rugby union player who plays for Pontypool RFC as a flanker having previously played for Cross Keys RFC. He is a Wales under-20 international.
