= Alun Donovan =

Welsh rugby player (born 1955)

- Full name: Alun John Donovan
- Born: 5 October 1955 (age 71) Abercrave, Wales

Rugby union career
- Position: Utility back
International career
Years	Team	Apps	(Points)
1978–82	Wales	5	(0)

Alun John Donovan (born 5 October 1955) is a Welsh former rugby union international.

Born in Abercrave, Donovan attended Maesydderwen School and St Paul's College, Cheltenham.

Donovan, capped five times for Wales, was a utility back with Swansea and Cardiff. On his Wales debut, against Australia in Sydney in 1978, Donovan started as the fullback, with injuries meaning J. P. R. Williams was required in the back row. He picked up an injury himself during the match, torn knee ligaments, and had to be substituted. Further injury issues delayed his return, but he added four further caps in 1981 and 1982, playing as a centre.

== See also ==
- List of Wales national rugby union players
