= Pontypool RFC =

Welsh rugby union club, based in Pontypool

- Full name: Pontypool Rugby Football Club
- Nickname: Pooler
- Founded: 1868
- Location: Pontypool, Wales
- Ground: Pontypool Park (Capacity: 8,800)
- Coach: Tom Hancock
- Captain: Michael Herbert
- League: Super Rygbi Cymru
- 2024-2025: Super Rygbi Cymru, 5th
Team kit

Official website
- www.pontypoolrugby.co.uk

Pontypool Rugby Football Club is a Welsh rugby union team based in the town of Pontypool, which plays in the Super Rygbi Cymru league. Since the regionalisation of Welsh rugby in 2003, Pontypool RFC is now a feeder club to the Dragons regional team. Pontypool play their home matches at Pontypool Park. Their traditional home kit is a red, white and black-hooped shirt and socks with white shorts, although they did gradually shift to wearing black shorts post-2003.

Pontypool has a long history within Welsh rugby and is one of the country's most notable clubs, being present at the formation of the Welsh Rugby Union in 1881, but disbanding before the turn of the 19th century. The club reformed in 1901 and produced many notable Wales and British Lions international players, including the Jones brothers in the early 20th century and the famed 'Pontypool Front Row' of Charlie Faulkner, Graham Price and Bobby Windsor in the 1970s. The club's 'Golden Era' is generally accepted as the 1970s and 1980s when, under the coaching of Ray Prosser, the first team won the Welsh Club Championship in 1973 and 1975.

== History ==
=== Early years ===
"The close of the cricketing season has led to the formation of a football club among the young men of Pontypool. A goodly number took part in the first match, which came off a few days since, and the sport was thoroughly enjoyed."

— Advertisement of the formation of the new club in the Pontypool Free Press, 31 October 1868.

Originally founded 1868, the club played its first match in October before hosting a game between the new club's members at the "Pound" Field on 12 November. The club later travelled to the Pontymoil Cricket Ground on the 9 January 1869, losing 4–1 to the Panteg Rustics.

In 1871, another Pontypool club was formed, called Pegler's Pontypool. However, the town was too small for two clubs and Pontypool FC and Pegler's Pontypool amalgamated on 15 September 1879. Pontypool FC were one of the six teams that created the South Wales Cup competition for 1877/1878. In March 1881, Pontypool was one of the eleven clubs present at the formation of the Welsh Rugby Union in Neath, but by the end of the century the club had disbanded.

In 1901, the club reformed, launching at a public meeting at the Pontypool Town Hall. The club was derived from a combination of three local clubs, Pontypool Thursdays, Pontypool Saturdays and Pontymoel. Pontypool RFC played their first official match at the Recreation Ground against Cardiff Romilly on 21 September 1901, and by 1904 the club had won the Monmouthshire League. After winning the Monmouthshire League again in 1907 Pontypool was recognised as having 'first-class' status for the 1907/08 season, allowing the club to face more notable opposition.

Pontypool's first international player to be capped directly from the club was Cliff Pritchard, who after playing his first games for Wales as a Newport player, joined Pontypool in 1905 and was capped as part of the 1906 Home Nations Championship. Closely following Pritchard were the Jones brothers, David (known as 'Ponty' Jones), Jack and 'Tuan'. All three were capped for the Wales team, representing their country over the period 1907–1921. As well as representing Wales, Jack and 'Tuan' both played for the British Isles team, making them the first British Lions to be selected from Pontypool. In season 1913/14 Pontypool became the unofficial Welsh Club Champions for the first time.

During the early 1920s, Pontypool was one of several major Welsh clubs to suffer from the emergence of professional rugby in England. The club's second Welsh Club Championship came in 1920/21. In the 1921–22 season Pontypool RFC began with only seven players available to them on their roster as players moved to clubs that paid a wage to play. Pontypool RFC continued to struggle through the 1920s, even though their success on the field was impressive. In 1927 Pontypool were victorious against the Waratahs and the Maoris but were two thousand pounds in debt, and the WRU's refusal to allow them a fixture against the South African national team caused local resentment. However Pontypool won back-to-back Welsh Club Championships in seasons 1931/32 and then 1932/33.

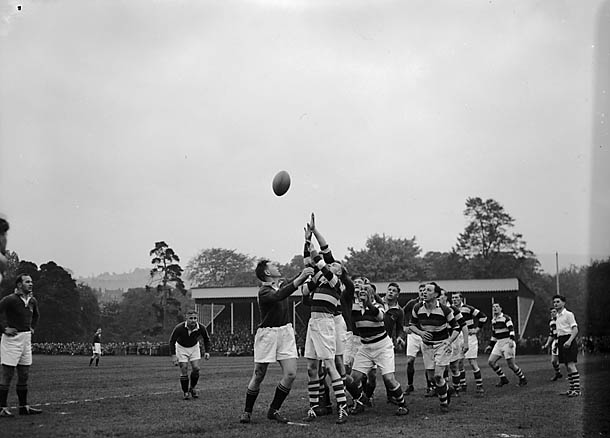
A combined Pontypool and Newbridge (hoops) verses South Africa (The Springboks) on 18 October 1951

In December 1947, a combined Pontypool, Talywain and Blaenavon side played against the Australian national team at Pontypool Park as part of a post-war rebuilding tour. The game ended 0–0. In 1958/59 season the club won the Western Mail's Unofficial Welsh Club Championship. Before the end of the century Pontypool won the Championship another six times in 1972/73, 1974/75, 1983/84, 1984/85, 1985/86 and in 1987/88 with a win percentage of 97.2%.

=== Golden era ===
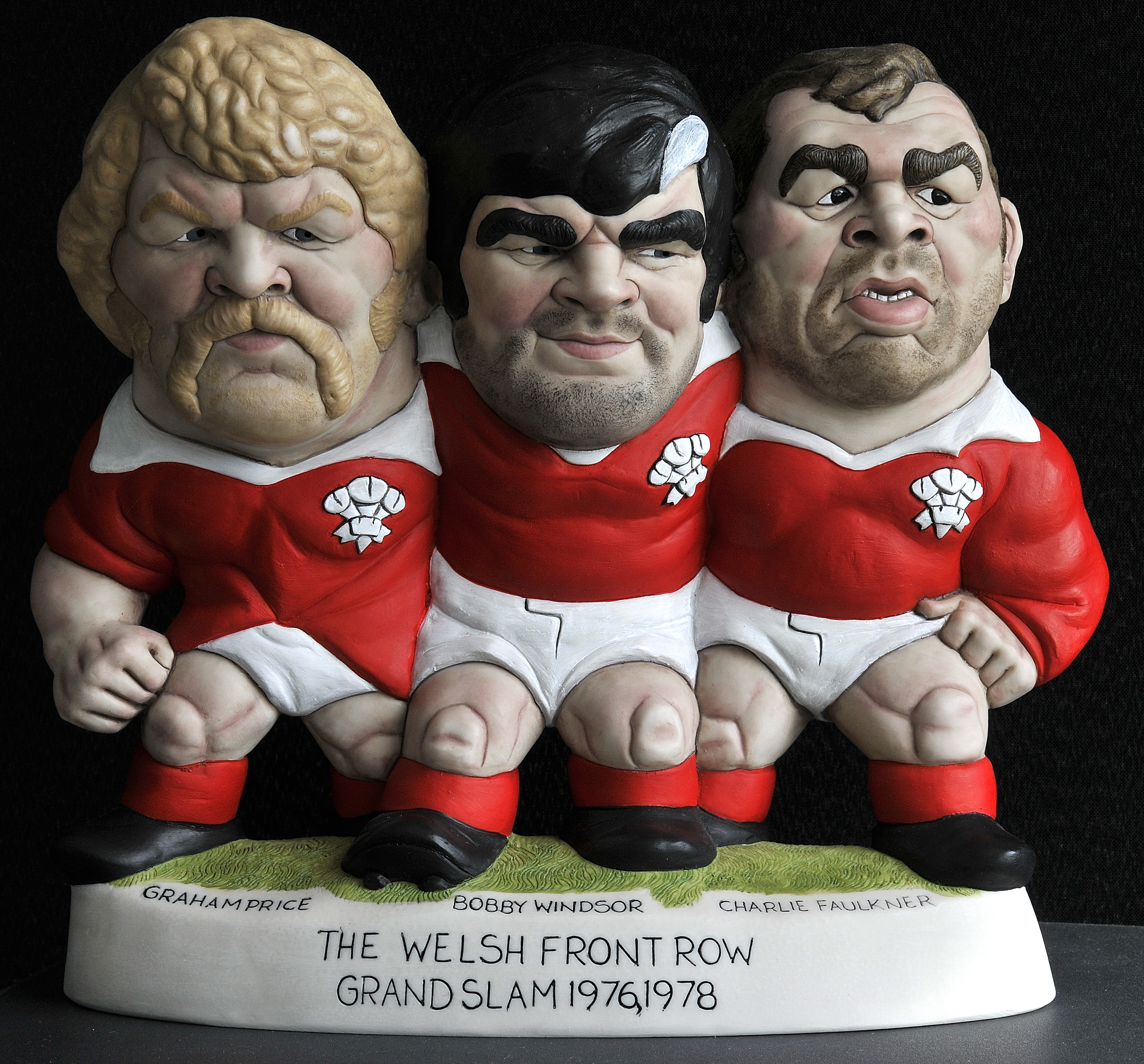
a Grog of the Pontypool frontrow, (left to right: Graham Price, Bobby Windsor and Charlie Faulkner)

The great days of Pontypool RFC were in the 1970s and 1980s, when Ray Prosser was coach for eighteen years from 1969. An away match at Pontypool was a daunting experience for even the strongest sides during this period. Their best ever season was probably 1987–88, when they won 35 matches out of 36, scoring 1011 points and conceding only 411 points.

The club's strength during its glory days was its forwards, particularly the legendary Pontypool Front Row celebrated in song by Max Boyce. The Pontypool Front Row also known as the "Viet Gwent", (motto "We may go down; we may go up; but we never go back") was made up of Graham Price, Bobby Windsor and Charlie Faulkner and played as a unit 19 times for Wales, only finishing on the losing side four times. They also played as a unit for the British and Irish Lions in several midweek matches and the final test match against Fiji.

=== Professional era ===
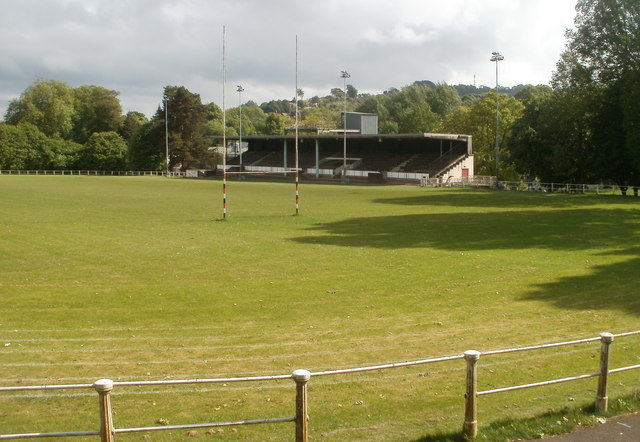
Pontypool Park in 2009

Pontypool were relegated from the Welsh Division 1 at the end of the 1995 season. In the 1997/98 season, they avoided relegation to Division 2 with a final-day 14–8 win over UWIC.

In February 2002, whilst still playing in Division 1, Pontypool defeated Swansea RFC, the then reigning Welsh/Scottish Champions, 16–14 in a pulsating Principality Cup clash at Pontypool Park. They went on to lose narrowly to Ebbw Vale RFC (22-27) in the quarter final.

In May 2002, Pontypool and Aberavon RFC finished at the top of Division 1 on the same number of league points and the same number of tries but the Wizards took the title on a better for/against points ratio. Aberavon then faced a two-legged play-off with Caerphilly, who had been relegated from the Premier Division. Aberavon lost the play-off (66–27 on aggregate) and remained in Division 1 for the 2002/3 season. The controversial play-off system was scrapped after this season.

In November 2002, Pontypool secured a plumb fixture with the touring Fiji national team at Pontypool Park. As the club was attempting to mount a serious title challenge, an under-strength Pontypool team was fielded. Pontypool did well in the first half, going into half time only 9 points adrift (22-13). The second half saw the 5,000 strong crowd witness some superb Fijian play and the tourists ran out easy winners by 74-16

In May 2003, the same scenario as the previous season occurred with both Pontypool and Aberavon locked in a two horse race for the title. Due to the clubs' original January fixture being rearranged, the league title would be decided in a winner-takes-all clash at the Talbot Athletic Ground on 13 May 2003. Pontypool defeated Aberavon 40-12 (outscoring the Wizards 5 tries to nil) and were crowned Welsh National League Division One Champions for season 2002–03.

On 2 May 2003, Lenny Woodard scored a club record 7 tries in a 90–3 win against Treorchy RFC. His three tries against Aberavon in the 13 May game took his tally for the season to 44 (39 league tries and five in the Principality Cup) and earned him the accolade of having Pontypool's best try aggregate since the First World War, surpassing the 39 by David Bishop in 1983–84, but still falling behind the 55 obtained by wing Tom Robbins in 1913–14.

Pontypool were promoted to the Premier Division in 2003. However, due to the restructuring of Welsh rugby, this league would become secondary to the new Celtic League. Pontypool became a feeder club for the Dragons regional team.

In May 2006 Pontypool finished bottom of the Premier Division and were relegated to Division One East

In the 2007/08 season Pontypool beat Beddau, the then Division One Champions, at Pontypool Park by 53-9 and were declared champions of Division One East and gained promotion to the Premiership Division unopposed as WRU Division One West champions, Tonmawr RFC, failed to achieve criteria laid out by the Welsh Rugby Union to allow membership of the Premier Division. Therefore, Tonmawr were not invited to contest the single promotion place against Pontypool RFC in a play off game.

=== Since 2012 ===
It was announced in September 2011 that the Premier Division would be reduced to 10 teams for the 2012–13 season. The teams for the league would be decided on three factors. Firstly, the holding of an 'A Licence' based on stadium criteria. The signing of a 'Participation Agreement' and judged on league results over the previous six seasons.

It was announced that four clubs, Pontypool, Tonmawr, Bridgend and Carmarthen had not achieved the required criteria to be included into the new league. However, pressure from Ospreys and Scarlets backers led to the league being extended to 12 teams with Bridgend and Carmarthen included. Tonmawr, citing financial reasons, opted not to take part in the new league at all and re-entered themselves into Division Six.

Pontypool launched a legal challenge to avoid being the only team relegated but lost the case despite the judge commenting that the WRU's changing of the structure was "against the rules" but that the WRU had the power to do so. Pontypool was guaranteed to be safeguarded from relegation in the first season in the Championship regardless of their final position.

Pontypool started the 2012/13 season poorly, losing all but one of their first twenty matches. However, their fortunes improved towards the end of the season, winning six of their last seven games. Pontypool ended the season in 12th place, above the two relegation places.

A fourth-placed finish in the 2013/14 season was followed by two successive fifth-placed finishes in 2014/2015 and 2015/16. At the end of the 2015/16 season, the leagues were reorganised and the top three teams were promoted to the premiership (Merthyr RFC, Swansea RFC and Bargoed RFC. The premiership was then ringfenced for the next three seasons. Pontypool won the league in the 2016/17 season, amassing 98 points and only losing one match (to Cardiff Met). This then sparked a three-season streak without losing a league match, winning back to back championships in the 2017/18, 2018/19, and 2019/20 seasons.

At the end of the 2018/19 season, Pontypool and Llanelli RFC, who had come bottom of the Welsh Premiership, were made to play a play-off game to determine who would play in the premiership in the 2019/20 season. Llanelli flooded their team with Scarlets players and ran out easy winners, 27-16.

With the 2020/21 season abandoned due to the COVID-19 pandemic, Pontypool achieved a third-placed finish in the 2021–22 season, and followed this up with a fifth championship in six (full) seasons and a championship cup win at the Millennium Stadium in 2022/23. This league win finally enabled Pontypool to be promoted back to the Welsh Premier Division where they ended the 2023/24 season in sixth place out of thirteen teams.

For the 25/26 season, Pooler made a number of signings with experience and not very old. Former Cardiff centre Ioan Evans joins the squad from Pontypridd, having played for the Blues and also in Penzance for the Cornish Pirates. Second Row Liam Antrobus joins the squad after having experience with MLR team Rugby Football Club Los Angeles. Wales U20 player Ioan Duggan signed from the Dragons alongside Walker Price. Scrum Half Rhodri Cole signs from Neath and Lloyd Riley joins Ioan Evans in leaving Pontypridd for Pontypool. Current Wales U20 hooker Evan Wood signs from Cardiff Met RFC alongside Aneurin James, brother of Dragons Academy player Owain, and also Ewan Burrows from Newport Saracens . Three promising props signed. Tom Sims joins from Dings Crusaders having spent three years prior at Bristol Bears academy. He also featured for Hartpury University in the Championship on a number of occasions and also played in New Zealand. Poland international Jake Wisniewski joins from Cross Keys. 20 year old Owen Popple joins from Leicester Tigers academy and has played at Hartpury. He's a product of Llantwit Fardre and follows in the footsteps of his older brother, Joe, in pulling on the Pooler jersey. Louis Rees joins from the Super Rygbi Cymru side Carmarthen Quins and is a quick and versatile winger. Local boy Sam Berry also joins and is a proven fly-half. Full back Sam Jones joins from Brecon having played for Merthyr and also RGC. Finally, three young players join with a key eye for development. Sion Hill joins from Glamorgan Wanderers and will remain there next season. Cai Wardman joins from Penallta and will also remain there. Finally, Connor Milsom joins from St. Peters and as the other two he will also remain.

As well as conventional Rugby they have a "walking Rugby" called "Pontypool Wizards"

== Current squad ==
The Pontypool RFC squad for the 2025-26 Super Rygbi Cymru Season is:
Player	Position
Kyan Best	Prop
Joel Patterson	Prop
Owen Popple	Prop
Owain James*	Prop
Dylan Kelleher-Griffiths*	Prop
Tom Sims	Prop
George Tuckley*	Prop
Kelvyn Williams	Prop
Jake Wisniewski	Prop
Harri Rock	Prop
Rhys Williams	Hooker
Tomoya Adachi	Hooker
Tiaan Hall*	Hooker
Sam Scarfe*	Hooker
Buster Bodkin	Lock
Liam Antrobus	Lock
Dan Bassett	Lock
Dan Hill	Lock
Joe Davies	Lock
Morgan Allen	Back Row
Callum Davies	Back Row
Ieuan Jones	Back Row
Ryan Jones*	Back Row
Scott Matthews	Back Row
Rakhat Clarkson	Back Row
Evan Minto*	Back Row
Luke Daniel	Back Row
Ben Williams	Back Row
Jake Sheppard*	Back Row

Player	Position
Ellis Lewis	Scrum-Half
Cai Wardman	Scrum Half
Morgan Lloyd*	Scrum Half
Jake Jenkins*	Scrum Half
Carter Pritchard*	Fly Half
Kieran Meek	Fly Half
Evan Lloyd	Fly Half
Pat Lewis	Centre
Connor Edwards	Centre
Joel Mahoney (VC)	Centre
Morgan Carter*	Centre
Ioan Duggan	Wing
Caio Parry*	Wing
Marcus Jones	Wing
Aneurin Patterson	Wing
Rhys Cole*	Wing
Ewan Rosser	Wing
Ellis Davies	Full Back
Carrick McDonough	Wing

Notes: * Denotes player allocated from Dragons RFC

== Notable former players ==
The players named below are all internationally capped players who have played for Pontypool.

- (Wales) Roger Addison
- (Wales) Frank Andrews
- (Wales) David Bishop
- (Wales) Roger Bidgood
- (Wales) Lloyd Burns
- (Wales) Eddie Butler
- (Wales) Ray Cale
- (Wales) Ray Cheney
- (Wales) Terry Cobner
- (Wales) Laurie Daniel
- (Wales) William Dowell
- (Wales) Kevin Ellis
- (Wales) Arthur 'Candy' Evans
- (Wales) Charlie Faulkner
- (Wales) Allen Forward
- (Wales) Byron Hayward
- (Czech Republic) Martin Jágr
- (Wales) Harry Jarman
- (Wales) Cliff Jones
- (Wales) Jack Jones
- (Wales) James Phillips Jones
- (Wales) Ken Jones
- (Wales) Mark Jones
- (Wales) Matt Jones
- (Wales) Percy Jones
- (Wales) Staff Jones
- (Wales) Steve Jones
- (Wales) Bobby Lloyd
- (Wales) Harry Peacock
- (Wales) John Perkins
- (Wales) Graham Price
- (Wales) Malcolm Price
- (Wales) Cliff Pritchard
- (Wales) Ray Prosser
- (Wales) Tom Rees
- (Wales) Cliff Richards
- (Wales) Mark Ring
- (Republic of Ireland) John Robbie
- (Wales) Clive Rowlands
- (Wales) Jeff Squire
- (Wales) Bill Tamplin
- (Wales) Bleddyn Taylor
- (Wales) Mark Taylor
- (Wales) Iestyn Thomas
- (Wales) Rees Thomas
- (Wales) Paul Turner
- (Wales) David Watkins
- (Wales) Bobby Windsor
- (Wales) Lenny Woodard (Rugby League)

== Club honours ==
- 1903–04; 1906–07 Monmouthshire League Champions
- 1913–14; 1920–21; 1931–32; 1958–59; 1972–73; 1974–75; 1983–84; 1984–85; 1985–86; 1987–88 Welsh Unofficial Club Champions.(10 times)
- 1982–83 Welsh cup - Winners
- 1990–91 WRU Challenge Cup Runners-Up
- 2001–02 Welsh National League Division 1 - Runners-Up
- 2002–03 Welsh National League Division 1 - Champions
- 2007–08 WRU Division One East - Champions
- 2016–17; 2017–18; 2018-19, 2022-2023 WRU National Championship - Champions

== Games played against international opposition ==
Year	Date	Opponent	Result	Score	Tour
1927	8 December	New South Wales	Win	6–3	1927–28 Waratahs tour of the British Isles, France and Canada
1981	4 November	Australia	Loss	6–37	1981–82 Australia rugby union tour of Britain and Ireland
1984	12 December	Australia	Loss	18–24	1984 Australia tour of Britain and Ireland
1989	18 October	New Zealand	Loss	6–47	1989 New Zealand tour of Canada and Britain
2002	4 November	Fiji	Loss	16–74	2002 Fiji tour of Britain and Ireland
