= Penarth RFC =

Welsh rugby union club, based in Penarth

Coordinates: 51.428059°N 3.181636°W

(Wales) Penarth RFC
- Full name: Penarth Rugby Football Club
- Founded: 1879; 147 years ago
- Location: Penarth, Wales
- Ground: Athletic Field
- President: John Davey
- Coach(es): Matt Bolton; Paul Williams
- Captain(s): Miles Jones with Spencer Robinson (vc)
- League: WRU Division Two East Central
- 2023-24: Wru league 2 east central
Team kit

Official website
- www.penarthrfc.co.uk

Penarth Rugby Football Club is a Welsh rugby union club based since 1924 at The Athletic Field, Lavernock Road, in Penarth, in the Vale of Glamorgan in Wales.

== Team history ==
=== Origins and early history ===
Penarth RFC was founded in 1879 by Cyril and Llewellyn Batchelor, sons of Cardiff politician John Batchelor, first named the Batchelor XV. There was another mention of a Penarth team playing in 1877 and again with the formation of a Penarth team in 1880. It joined with Penarth Dreadnoughts in 1882 and became Penarth Football Club. The team were nicknamed the "Donkey Island Butcher Boys" or the "Seasiders". Early games were played on a field which is now occupied by Penarth's All Saints Church.

In 1891 the pitch was relocated to land owned by the Earl of Plymouth on Stanwell Road. This was used to grow vegetables during the 1914-18 Great War. Seventeen Penarth RFC players were killed during the war and are commemorated by the Memorial Stand above the clubhouse's Long Room.

The club subsequently moved to a field on Lavernock Road owned by Fred Davies of Morristown. Finally the team moved to a permanent home at the Athletics Field, again provided by the Earl of Plymouth for the town's rugby, cricket and hockey teams.

=== International players ===
A number of Penarth RFC players have achieved international caps for Wales and the British Lions, between the late 1880s and the early 1960s. These included Richard Garrett (1888 – 1892), George Rowles (1892) and John M C Dyke (1906). Brothers Len and John Dyke were toured New Zealand with the 1908 Anglo-Welsh team, joined by former Penarth captain Reggie Gibbs.

Tommy Garrett and Tommy Crossman played a school-boy international for Wales against England in 1909. Other Penarth players gaining Welsh international caps were Mel Rosser (1924), Jack Bassett (1929–1932), Gomer Hughes (1934) and Frank Trott (1939–1945). Jack Bassett also played all five test matches with the British Lions in 1930. He also played for the Barbarians and captained the Wales team on nine occasions. Elwyn Jones played for the Barbarians against the 1963 All Blacks.

=== Annual games against the Barbarians FC ===
The club traditionally hosted the Barbarians Football Club each year from 1901, for their annual Good Friday fixture. Over the next 75 meetings, Penarth won eleven games, drew four and lost 60. The final Penarth v Barbarians game took place in 1986, though a special centenary commemorative game took place in 2001 before the Barbarians played Wales at the Millennium Stadium. A plaque at the clubhouse marks the event.

=== Notable former players ===
- (Wales) Jack Bassett (15 caps)
- (Scotland) James Bridie
- John Dyke, Wales and British Lions
- (Wales) Dickie Garrett (8 caps)
- (Wales) Reggie Gibbs (16 caps)
- (Wales) Gomer Hughes
- (Wales) Iorwerth 'Iorrie' Isaacs
- (Wales) Leslie "Les" Manfield
- (Wales) Austin Matthews
- (Wales) Jamie Ringer
- (Wales) Mel Rosser
- (Wales) George Rowles
- (Wales) Ralph Sweet-Escott
- (New Zealand) Hemi Taylor
- (Wales) LS Thomas 1908 British Lions
- (Wales) Chris Thorne
- Allan Martin, Wales, Barbarians and British Lions
- Les Keen, Wales
- (South Africa) Rudolf Straeuli, Springboks player and coach

== Penarth RFC today ==
The club celebrated its 125th anniversary during the 2004–05 season. During the course of the year a number of special games were played, including fixtures against the Glamorgan County, Welsh Academicals, and Coal Island Éire sides.

Former Penarth Youth RFC player Jamie Ringer took part in the 2006 Commonwealth Games in Melbourne, as part of the Wales national rugby sevens team. Also that year former Wales rugby Captain Hemi Taylor, a playing member of Penarth RFC senior team, presented the club's highly successful youth section with a cheque for £1,500 on behalf of the ‘Bears Golf Society'. Originally the Bears, who formed in 1982, raised money only for the senior Penarth team. After a hard and concerted campaign in 2006–07, Penarth RFC won promotion to the Welsh National League Division 3 South-East by finishing runner-up in Division 4 South-East.

After the 2009–2010 season the team gained promotion to Division 2 East. The club currently play in Division 3 East Central A of the WRU Leagues.

Penarth are coached by Matthew Bolton and Tristan Davies. The Club Captain for the 2018/19 season is D. Rhys Morgan with Chris Mortimer and Alan Doyle being vice captains.
