= Barry Clegg (rugby union) =

Welsh rugby union player (born 1951)

- Full name: Barry George Clegg
- Born: 30 October 1951 (age 75) Cymmer, Wales

Rugby union career
- Position: Lock
International career
Years	Team	Apps	(Points)
1979	Wales	1	(0)

Barry George Clegg (born 30 October 1951) is a Welsh former rugby union international.

Born in Cymmer, Clegg was a lock who played mostly for Swansea and Neath during his career.

Clegg had been around the Wales team for several years before earning his solitary cap. On a 1975 tour of Asia, he and future Wales coach Gareth Jenkins made their Wales debuts in a match against Japan, but this was not a full international. He was also on the 1978 tour of Australia. It was an injury to Clegg's then Swansea teammate Geoff Wheel that allowed him to gain a Wales cap in the 1979 Five Nations match against France at the Parc des Princes.

== See also ==
- List of Wales national rugby union players
