= Dickie Garrett =

Wales international rugby union footballer

- Born: Richard Marks Garrett; 1865 Cardiff, Wales
- Died: 17 February 1908 (aged 42–43) Penarth, Wales
- Occupation: coal tipper

Rugby union career
- Position: Centre
Amateur team(s)
Years	Team	Apps	(Points)
–	Penarth RFC		
International career
Years	Team	Apps	(Points)
1888–1892	Wales	8	(0)

Richard Garrett (1865 – 17 February 1908) was a Welsh international rugby union player who played club rugby for Penarth and international rugby for Wales. Garrett was a collier by trade and in 1908 was killed when he was crushed by a coal truck.

== Rugby career ==
Garrett first came to prominence as a rugby player when representing Penarth. During the 1888/89 season he was the captain of the Penarth senior team, winning the Cardiff District Cup in 1888. In December 1888 he was first selected to represent his country as part of the Wales team to face the New Zealand Māoris. Although the Welsh crowd was hostile to many of their own players; due to the belief that the Swansea back row had been unjustly overlooked, the team played well beating the visitors by a goal and two tries to nil.

Garrett's next international game was against Scotland in the opening match of the 1889 Home Nations Championship. Under the captaincy of Frank Hill, Wales lost the game by two tries to nil. although Garrett missed the last game of the 1889 Championship, he was re-selected in 1890 and played in all three matches of the tournament. Wales lost the opening game against Scotland, but won a historic victory over England at Crown Flatt in Dewsbury, when Wales beat the English for the first time. The final game of the Championship saw Wales draw against Ireland.

Garrett represented Wales on three more occasions. He played in the away game at Raeburn Place to Scotland, which Wales lost heavily, and the home game at Stradey Park against Ireland which Wales won narrowly; both as part of the 1891 Home Nations Championship. His final game was in 1892 against eventual Triple Crown winners, England.

=== International matches played ===
Wales (rugby union)

- England 1890, 1892
- Ireland 1890, 1891
- Māori 1888
- Scotland 1889, 1890, 1891

== Bibliography ==
- Billot, John (1972). All Blacks in Wales. Ferndale, Glamorgan: Ron Jones Publications.
- Godwin, Terry (1984). The International Rugby Championship 1883-1983. Grafton Street, London: Willow Books. ISBN 0-00-218060-X.
- Smith, David; Williams, Gareth (1980). Fields of Praise: The Official History of The Welsh Rugby Union. Cardiff: University of Wales Press. ISBN 0-7083-0766-3.
