= Geoff Wheel =

Wales international rugby union footballer (1951–2024)

- Born: Geoffrey Wheel; 30 June 1951 Swansea, Wales
- Died: 26 December 2024 (aged 73)

Rugby union career
- Position: Lock
Amateur team(s)
Years	Team	Apps	(Points)
- Mumbles RFC
- Swansea RFC
International career
Years	Team	Apps	(Points)
1974–1982	Wales	32	(0)

Geoffrey Wheel (30 June 1951 – 26 December 2024) was a Wales international rugby union player who attained 32 international caps. A lock-forward, he played club rugby for Mumbles RFC and then Swansea RFC.

Wheel made his international debut on 2 February 1974 versus Ireland and between 1974 and 1982 he formed a formidable second-row partnership for Wales with Allan Martin during the second 'golden-age' of the Wales international team.

In 1977 Wheel, along with Willie Duggan of Ireland, became the first players to be sent off in a Five Nations international match.

Wheel was the organist in the Parish of St Thomas in Swansea where he also ran Geoff's Tuck Shop at the Boys Brigade every Wednesday. In 2011 he agreed to become the president of a Welsh male voice choir, the Swansea-based Gwalia Singers.

Wheel died from motor neurone disease on 26 December 2024, at the age of 73.
