= Stuart Lane =

British Lions & Wales international rugby union player

- Born: Stuart Morris Lane; 12 November 1952 (age 74) Tredegar, Wales
- Height: 183 cm (6 ft 0 in)
- Weight: 92 kg (14 st 7 lb)
- School: Tredegar Grammar School
- University: Cardiff College of Education
- Occupation: teacher

Rugby union career
- Position: Flanker
Amateur team(s)
Years	Team	Apps	(Points)
- Cardiff RFC
–	Newport RFC		
–	Newbridge RFC		
International career
Years	Team	Apps	(Points)
1978-1980	Wales	5	(0)
1980	British and Irish Lions	1	(0)

Stuart Lane (born 12 November 1952) is a former Wales international rugby union player. In 1980 he toured South Africa with the British and Irish Lions and at the time played club rugby for Cardiff RFC.

== British and Irish Lions ==
Lane holds the unfortunate record of the shortest career of any Lions tourist, having been injured in the first minute of the opening game of the 1980 tour. This injury was a blow to the tourists as it was felt that the pace Lane could have provided in the breakaway positions would have been a strong asset for the Lions. He still lives in Tredegar and is part owner of Rhyd Hall.
