= Charlie Faulkner =

British Lions & Wales international rugby union player (1941–2023)

- Born: Anthony George Faulkner; 27 February 1941 Newport, Wales
- Died: 9 February 2023 (aged 81)
- School: St Mary's School, Newport

Rugby union career
- Position: Prop
Amateur team(s)
Years	Team	Apps	(Points)
- Newport Saracens RFC
–	Cross Keys RFC		
–	Pontypool RFC	210	(48)
–	Barbarian F.C.		
–	Monmouthshire		
International career
Years	Team	Apps	(Points)
1975–1979	Wales	19	(4)
1977	British Lions	0	(0)
Coaching career
- Years: Team
- 1982-86: Newport RFC

Anthony George "Charlie" Faulkner (27 February 1941 – 9 February 2023) was a Welsh rugby union footballer who played in the 1970s and later a rugby coach.

== Wales caps ==
Charlie joined Pontypool from Cross Keys in September 1972 and went on to make 210 Pooler appearances and scored 12 tries. He also played for the Barbarians and, in January 1975, made history with his fellow Pontypool front row colleagues, hooker Bobby Windsor and tight head prop Graham Price to be the first club front row to be selected to play for Wales, against France, in Paris. Together, the Pontypool Front Row played 19 times for their country between 1975 and 1979, and Charlie scored a try against Ireland in 1975. During their stay in the Welsh team, Wales won the Grand Slam twice and the Triple Crown three times. The Front Row also represented Monmouthshire and the British Lions in 1977 when Charlie was a replacement on the tour and the trio played in three of the last five games – against Counties/Thames Valley, Bay of Plenty and the game against Fiji on their journey home – the first club front row to play for the British Lions. The Front Row was referred to as the ‘Viet Gwent’ in a song called ‘Up and Under, Here We Go’ by Max Boyce, the popular Welsh entertainer.

== The Pontypool Front Row ==
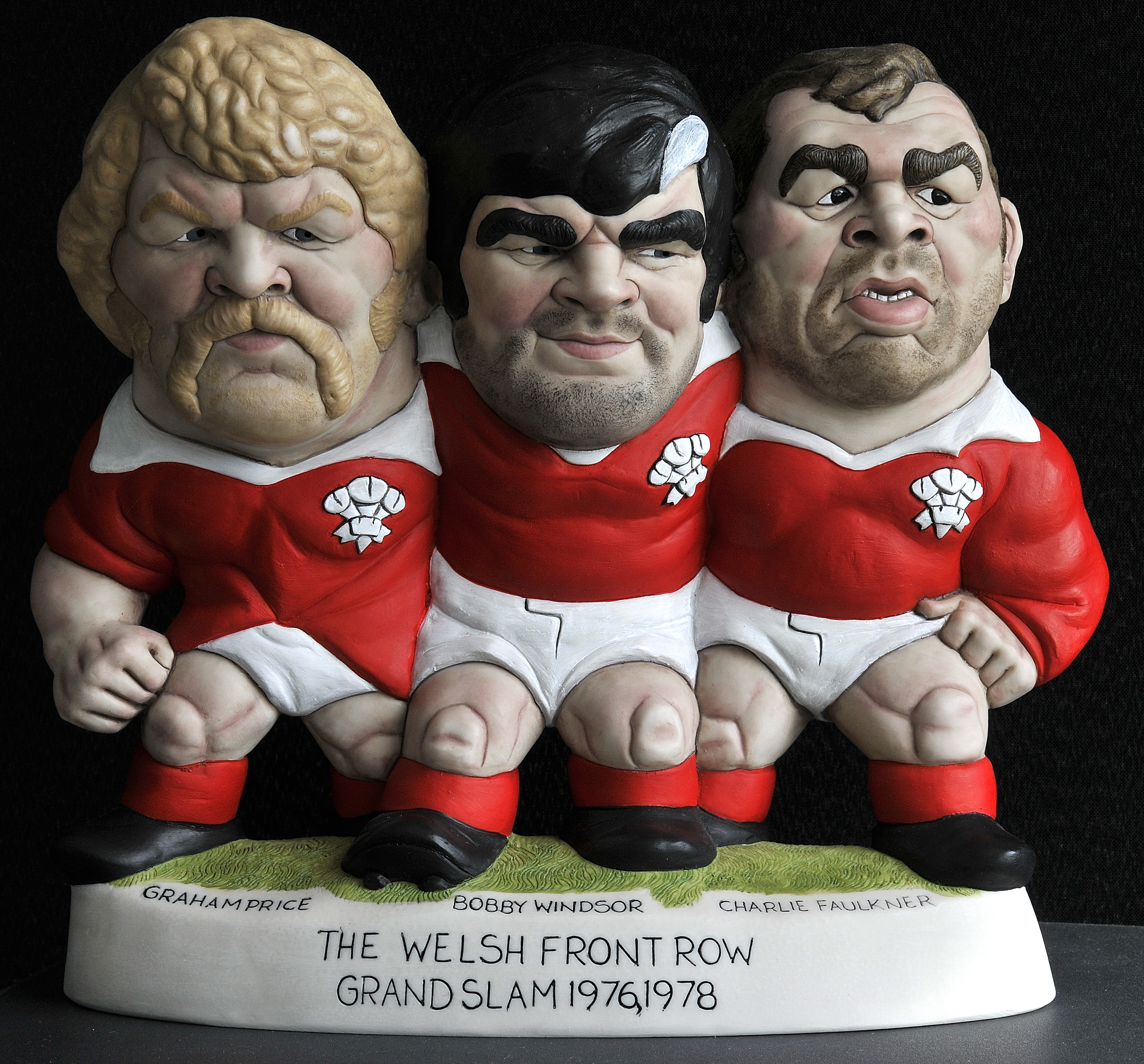
a Grog of the Pontypool frontrow, (from left to right: Graham Price, Bobby Windsor and Faulkner)

With Bobby Windsor and Graham Price he became part of the Pontypool Front Row also known as the Viet Gwent (a play on Viet Cong) and immortalized in song by Max Boyce.

Faulkner was also a Judo Black Belt and a steelworker by trade.

== Personal life and death ==
Faulkner died from heart failure on 9 February 2023, at the age of 81.

His autobiography, which was written with Greg Lewis, was called Charlie Faulkner: The 1 and Only and was published shortly after he died. It featured many tributes to Faulkner, including from Gareth Edwards, Max Boyce, Gareth Davies, Gerald Davies, Terry Holmes, Bobby Windsor, Graham Price, Brynmor Williams, Phil Steele and Alan Wilkins.
