= Clive Shell =

Welsh rugby union footballer

- Born: Robert Clive Shell; 9 September 1947 Pyle, Wales
- Died: 6 January 2012 (aged 64)
- Occupation: schoolmaster

Rugby union career
- Position: Scrum half
Amateur team(s)
Years	Team	Apps	(Points)
- Pyle RFC
–	Aberavon RFC		
–	Barbarian F.C.		
International career
Years	Team	Apps	(Points)
1973	Wales	1	(0)
Coaching career
- Years: Team
- 1984–87: Aberavon RFC

Clive Shell (9 September 1947 – 6 January 2012) was a Welsh international rugby union player. Shell made his debut for the Wales national rugby union team on 10 November 1973 against Australia where he kissed the ball on his first touch while putting the ball into a scrum. A scrum-half, he played club rugby for Aberavon RFC.

Shell was one of several scrum halves of that era who were in competition with Gareth Edwards for a place in the Welsh side. Although the Australia encounter was his one and only cap, Shell played for Wales against Tonga (1974). In 1977, during a Welsh Cup semi-final, Shell received a broken jaw playing against Edwards and Cardiff RFC.

Shell formed a club half-back partnership with John Bevan who was also capped by Wales. He captained Aberavon RFC in the seasons of 1977–78, 1978–79 and 1979–80 before retiring.

A school teacher by profession, Shell coached Aberavon during the early 1980s. Shell's death was announced on 6 January 2012.
