= Bobby Windsor =

British Lions & Wales international rugby union player

- Born: Robert William Windsor; 31 January 1948 (age 78) Newport, Monmouthshire
- Height: 1.75 m (5 ft 9 in)
- Weight: 93 kg (14 st 9 lb)
- School: Brynglas Secondary Modern School
- Occupation: Steelworker

Rugby union career
- Position: Hooker
Amateur team(s)
Years	Team	Apps	(Points)
- Brynglas
1970-1971	Cardiff RFC	4	(6)
–	Cross Keys		
1973-?	Pontypool	325	(348)
1973-1974	Barbarians	5	(4)
International career
Years	Team	Apps	(Points)
1973 - 1979	Wales	28	(4)
1974 & 1977	British Lions	5	(0)

Robert William Windsor (born 31 January 1948 in Newport, Monmouthshire), known as Bobby and nicknamed "The Duke", is a former rugby union player who gained 28 rugby union caps for Wales as a hooker between 1973 and 1979. Windsor published his autobiography in October 2010 entitled 'The Iron Duke'.

== Early career ==
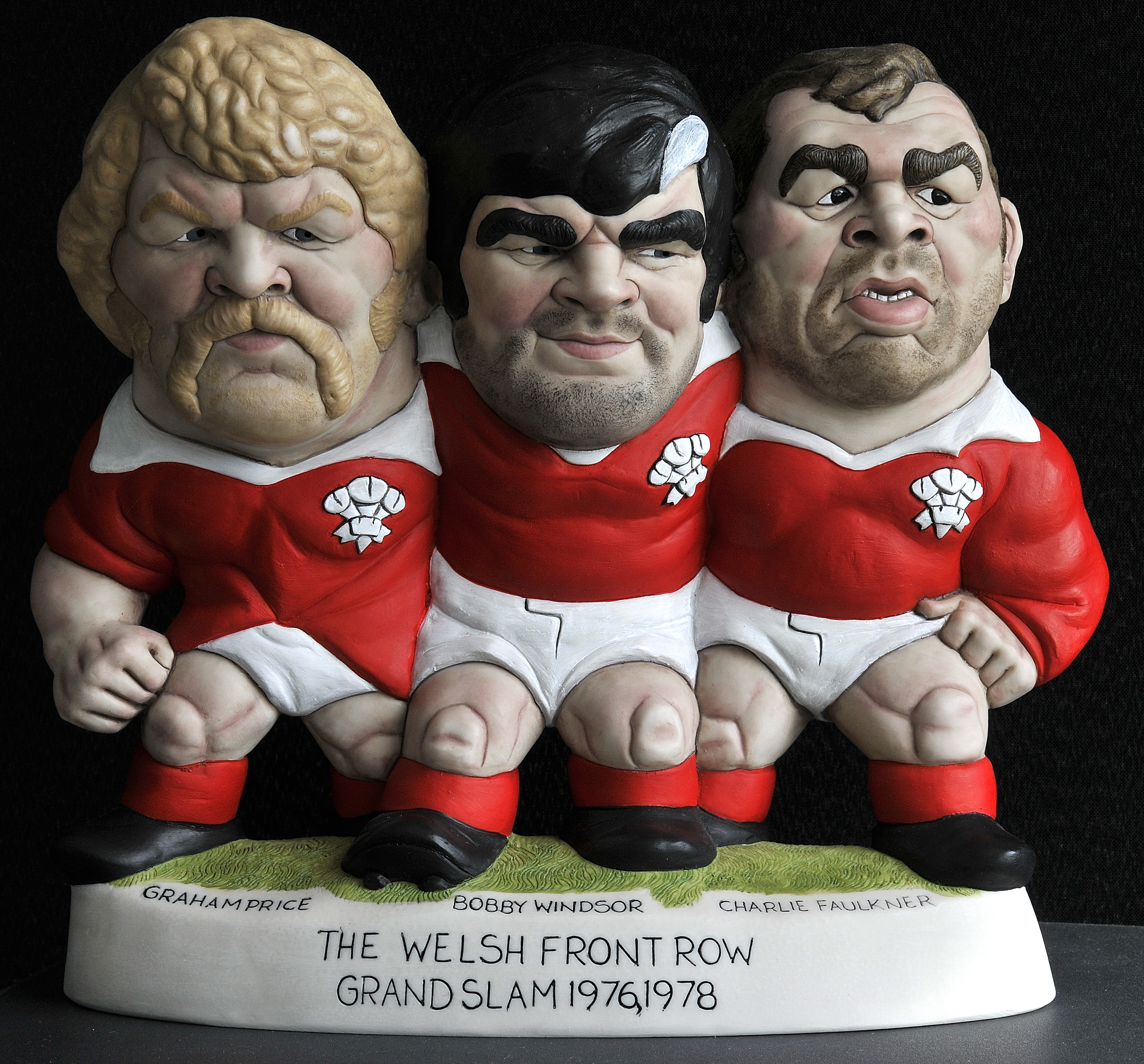
a Grog of the Pontypool frontrow, (left to right: Graham Price, Windsor and Charlie Faulkner)

A steelworker by trade, Windsor actually began his rugby union career as a back, playing at fullback and fly-half, but became famous as a hooker. He played for Brynglas and Cross Keys, Cardiff RFC before joining Pontypool where with Graham Price and Charlie Faulkner he became part of the legendary Pontypool Front Row, also known as the Viet Gwent (a play on Viet Cong) and immortalised in song by Max Boyce.Bobby made 325 appearances for the club, mainly at hooker, scored 87 tries and played for Pontypool against the 1981 Australians. Clubman in 1980-81 and 1981-82, he was club coach in 1987-88 and again 1993-95. He was on the club committee 1990-95 being vice-chairman in 1992-93.

== Wales ==
Windsor made his debut for Wales against Australia in Cardiff in 1973, a match Wales won by 24 points to nil with Windsor scoring a hooker's try, and took over from Jeff Young as first-choice hooker. The Pontypool front row played for Wales as a unit 19 times during the 1970s, and were on the losing side in only four of those matches. He played his last international match against France in February 1979.

== British Lion ==
Windsor was selected for two British Lions tours. He played in all the tests on the tour of South Africa in 1974, and helped the Lions forwards dominate the Springboks. On the later tour of New Zealand in 1977 he played only in the first test and did not recapture his form in South Africa.
