= Graham Price =

British Lions & Wales international rugby union player

Graham Price MBE
- Born: Graham Price; 24 November 1951 (age 74) Moascar, Egypt
- School: West Monmouth Grammar School; Nash College, Newport
- University: University of Wales Institute of Science and Technology

Rugby union career
- Position: Prop
Amateur team(s)
Years	Team	Apps	(Points)
	Pontypool RFC	567	(228)
–	Barbarian F.C.		
–	Monmouthshire County RFC		
International career
Years	Team	Apps	(Points)
1975–1983	Wales	41	(8)
1977–1983	British Lions	12	(4)

Graham Price MBE (born 24 November 1951 in Moascar, Egypt) is a former Welsh rugby union player, who was a member of the famous Pontypool RFC front row known as the "Viet Gwent". He won 41 caps for Wales, and a record 12 for the British and Irish Lions as a prop forward (second in most caps for the British and Irish lions after Willie John McBride )

== Early life ==
Graham Price was born in Moascar, Egypt, on 24 November 1951. He was brought up in Pontypool, where he was educated at West Monmouth School. He studied civil engineering at UWIST, part of the University of Wales in Cardiff.

== Rugby career ==
=== Pontypool ===
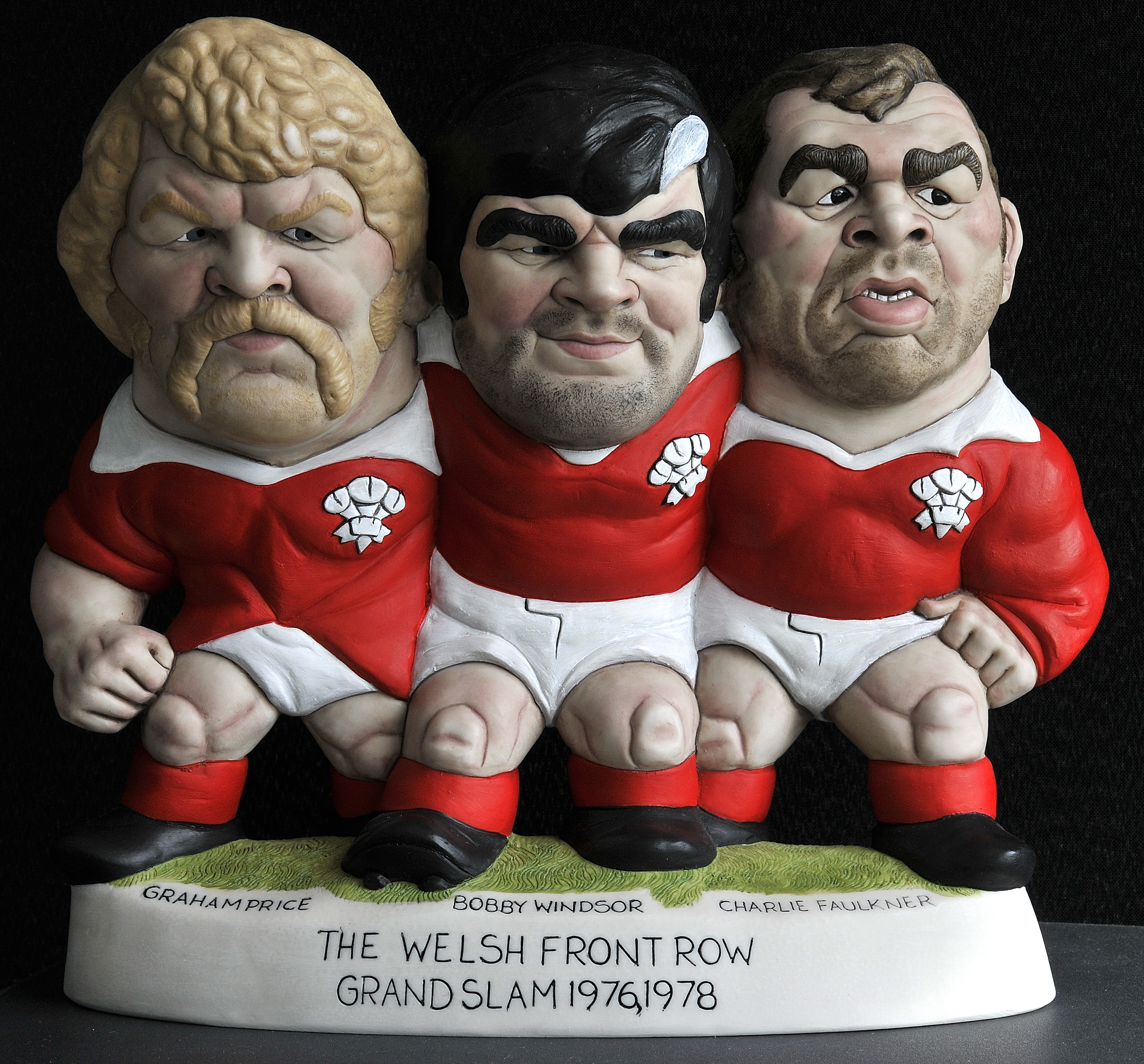
a Grog of the Pontypool frontrow, (from left to right: Price, Bobby Windsor and Charlie Faulkner)

He joined Pontypool after leaving school, and played at tight-head prop. With Bobby Windsor and Charlie Faulkner he became part of the legendary front row, also known as the "Viet Gwent" (a play on Viet Cong) and immortalised in song by Max Boyce. Price played 567 times for the club scoring 57 tries.

=== Wales caps ===
He made his debut for Wales national rugby union team in the 1975 Five Nations Championship against France at the Parc des Princes in Paris. The game featured six players earning their first cap, and the entire Pontypool front line. When the ball was hacked forward some 3 metres (9.8 ft) from the French line following a Welsh counter attack, Price caught the ball as it bounced and ran it in for a try. Wales won by 25–10, their biggest victory over the French since 1909, and the try was subsequently voted the fourth best try ever by a Welsh player. The BBC’s commentator of the match Nigel Starmer-Smith memorably said of Price’s try at the time ‘They will never believe it in Pontypool’. Grand Slams followed for the Wales team in 1976 and 1978.

=== British and Irish Lion ===
Price played as a prop in a record 12 successive tests for the British and Irish Lions, touring New Zealand in 1977. . During a test match against Australia, he suffered a broken jaw after a punch by Steve Finnane. Price had to eat liquidised food for six weeks, and wore dentures for the following 40 years until replaced by implants in 2015. He returned for the South Africa in 1980 and made his final international appearances in the New Zealand in 1983 at the age of 31. He had played in every test match of all three tours. His record of 12 appearances for a prop for the British and Irish Lions is not expected to be broken.

== Outside rugby ==
In 2012 Price made a cameo appearance as himself in an episode of the UK comedy drama Stella.

== Recognition ==
Price was appointed a Member of the Order of the British Empire (MBE) in the 2007 Birthday Honours for services to rugby union in Wales.
