= 1994 Five Nations Championship squads =

Rugby union competition squads

== England ==
Head Coach: Geoff Cooke

1. Rob Andrew
2. Neil Back
3. Stuart Barnes
4. Martin Bayfield
5. Kyran Bracken
6. Jonathan Callard
7. Will Carling (c.)
8. Mike Catt
9. Ben Clarke
10. Graham Dawe
11. Phil de Glanville
12. Jon Hall
13. Ian Hunter
14. Martin Johnson
15. Jason Leonard
16. Brian Moore
17. Dewi Morris
18. Steve Ojomoh
19. David Pears
20. Nigel Redman
21. Dean Richards
22. Tim Rodber
23. Graham Rowntree
24. Dean Ryan
25. Victor Ubogu
26. Rory Underwood
27. Tony Underwood

== France ==
Head Coach: Pierre Berbizier

1. Guy Accoceberry
2. Louis Armary
3. Abdelatif Benazzi
4. Philippe Benetton
5. Laurent Benezech
6. Philippe Bernat-Salles
7. Xavier Blond
8. Olivier Brouzet
9. Laurent Cabannes
10. Marc Cecillon
11. Yann Delaigue
12. Philippe Gallart
13. Fabien Galthié
14. Jean-Michel Gonzales
15. Stéphane Graou
16. Thierry Lacroix
17. Fabrice Landreau
18. Leon Loppy
19. Alain Macabiau
20. Olivier Merle
21. Franck Mesnel
22. Pierre Montlaur
23. Émile Ntamack
24. Alain Penaud
25. Olivier Roumat (c.)
26. Jean-Luc Sadourny
27. Philippe Saint-André (c.)*
28. Laurent Seigne
29. Philippe Sella
30. William Téchoueyres

*captain in the last game

== Ireland ==
Head Coach: Gerry Murphy

1. Michael Bradley (c.)
2. Ciaran Clarke
3. Peter Clohessy
4. Vince Cunningham
5. Phil Danaher
6. Eric Elwood
7. Maurice Field
8. Neil Francis
9. Mick Galwey
10. Simon Geoghegan
11. Garret Halpin
12. Paddy Johns
13. Terry Kingston
14. Alan McGowan
15. Denis McBride
16. Mark McCall
17. Paul McCarthy
18. Ken O'Connell
19. Conor O'Shea
20. Nick Popplewell
21. Brian Robinson
22. Rob Saunders
23. David Tweed
24. Richard Wallace
25. Keith Wood

== Scotland ==
Head Coach: Jim Telfer

1. Gary Armstrong
2. Paul Burnell
3. Craig Chalmers
4. Michael Dods
5. Neil Edwards
6. Gavin Hastings (c.)
7. Scott Hastings
8. Carl Hogg
9. Ian Jardine
10. Kenny Logan
11. Kevin McKenzie
12. Kenny Milne
13. Iain Morrison
14. Shade Munro
15. Andy Nicol
16. Bryan Redpath
17. Andy Reed
18. Alan Sharp
19. Ian Smith
20. Tony Stanger
21. Derek Stark
22. Gregor Townsend
23. Derek Turnbull
24. Rob Wainwright
25. Peter Walton
26. Alan Watt
27. Doddie Weir
28. Peter Wright
29. Douglas Wyllie

== Wales ==
Head Coach: Alan Davies

1. Tony Clement
2. Tony Copsey
3. John D. Davies
4. Nigel Davies
5. Phil Davies
6. Ieuan Evans (c.)
7. Ricky Evans
8. Michael Hall
9. Simon Hill
10. Garin Jenkins
11. Neil Jenkins
12. Robert Jones
13. Emyr Lewis
14. Gareth Llewellyn (c.)*
15. Robin McBryde
16. Rupert Moon
17. Mark Perego
18. Wayne Proctor
19. Scott Quinnell
20. Mike Rayer
21. Hemi Taylor
22. Nigel Walker
23. Barry Williams
24. Hugh Williams-Jones

*captain in the third game
