= 1993 Five Nations Championship squads =

Rugby union competition squads

== England ==
Head coach: Geoff Cooke

1. Rob Andrew
2. Stuart Barnes
3. Steve Bates
4. Martin Bayfield
5. Will Carling (c.)
6. Ben Clarke
7. Phil de Glanville
8. Wade Dooley
9. Jeremy Guscott
10. Ian Hunter
11. Martin Johnson
12. Jason Leonard
13. Brian Moore
14. Dewi Morris
15. John Olver
16. Jeff Probyn
17. Dean Richards
18. Tim Rodber
19. Mike Teague
20. Victor Ubogu
21. Rory Underwood
22. Tony Underwood
23. Jonathan Webb
24. Peter Winterbottom

== France ==
Head coach: Pierre Berbizier

1. Louis Armary
2. Abdelatif Benazzi
3. Philippe Benetton
4. Laurent Cabannes
5. Didier Camberabero
6. Jérôme Cazalbou
7. Marc Cecillon
8. Stéphane Graou
9. Pierre Hontas
10. Aubin Hueber
11. Thierry Lacroix
12. Jean-Baptiste Lafond
13. Fabrice Landreau
14. Eric Melville
15. Franck Mesnel
16. Stéphane Ougier
17. Olivier Roumat
18. Philippe Saint-André
19. Laurent Seigne
20. Philippe Sella
21. Jean-François Tordo (c.)

== Ireland ==
Head coach: Ciaran Fitzgerald

1. Michael Bradley (c.)
2. Ciaran Clarke
3. Peter Clohessy
4. Richard Costello
5. Vince Cunningham
6. Phil Danaher
7. Eric Elwood
8. Maurice Field
9. Neil Francis
10. Mick Galwey
11. Simon Geoghegan
12. Brian Glennon
13. Garret Halpin
14. Paddy Johns
15. Terry Kingston
16. Phil Lawlor
17. Alan McGowan
18. Niall Malone
19. Denis McBride
20. Paul McCarthy
21. Ken O'Connell
22. Patrick O'Hara
23. Conor O'Shea
24. Nick Popplewell
25. Brian Robinson
26. Rob Saunders
27. Steve Smith
28. Richard Wallace
29. Colin Wilkinson
30. Keith Wood

== Scotland ==
Head coach: Jim Telfer

1. Gary Armstrong
2. Paul Burnell
3. Craig Chalmers
4. Ian Corcoran
5. Damian Cronin
6. Gavin Hastings (c.)
7. Scott Hastings
8. Carl Hogg
9. Ian Jardine
10. Kenny Logan
11. Kenny Milne
12. Iain Morrison
13. Andy Nicol
14. Andy Reed
15. Stuart Reid
16. Graham Shiel
17. Tony Stanger
18. Derek Stark
19. Gregor Townsend
20. Derek Turnbull
21. Alan Watt
22. Doddie Weir
23. Peter Wright

== Wales ==
Head coach: Alan Davies

1. Paul Arnold
2. Tony Clement
3. Tony Copsey
4. John D. Davies
5. Nigel Davies
6. Phil Davies
7. Stuart Davies
8. Ieuan Evans (c.)
9. Ricky Evans
10. Scott Gibbs
11. Michael Hall
12. Neil Jenkins
13. Robert Jones
14. Andrew Lamerton
15. Emyr Lewis
16. Gareth Llewellyn
17. Nigel Meek
18. Rupert Moon
19. Mark Perego
20. Wayne Proctor
21. Mike Rayer
22. Alan Reynolds
23. Nigel Walker
24. Richard Webster
25. Hugh Williams-Jones
