= 1995 Five Nations Championship squads =

Rugby union competition squads

== England ==
Head coach: Jack Rowell

1. Rob Andrew
2. Martin Bayfield
3. Kyran Bracken
4. Will Carling (c)
5. Mike Catt
6. Ben Clarke
7. Jeremy Guscott
8. Martin Johnson
9. Jason Leonard
10. Brian Moore
11. Dewi Morris
12. Steve Ojomoh
13. Dean Richards
14. Tim Rodber
15. Graham Rowntree
16. Victor Ubogu
17. Rory Underwood
18. Tony Underwood

== France ==
Head coach: Pierre Berbizier

1. Guy Accoceberry
2. Louis Armary
3. Abdelatif Benazzi
4. Philippe Benetton
5. Laurent Benezech
6. Philippe Bernat-Salles
7. Olivier Brouzet
8. Laurent Cabannes
9. Christian Califano
10. Marc Cecillon
11. Marc de Rougemont
12. Yann Delaigue
13. Christophe Deylaud
14. Philippe Gallart
15. Jean-Michel Gonzales
16. Thierry Lacroix
17. Olivier Merle
18. Franck Mesnel
19. Émile Ntamack
20. Olivier Roumat
21. Jean-Luc Sadourny
22. Philippe Saint-André (c)
23. Laurent Seigne
24. Philippe Sella
25. Sébastien Viars

== Ireland ==
Head coach: Gerry Murphy

1. Jonny Bell
2. Michael Bradley
3. Paul Burke
4. Peter Clohessy
5. David Corkery
6. Ben Cronin
7. Phil Danaher
8. Eric Elwood
9. Maurice Field
10. Anthony Foley
11. Neil Francis
12. Gabriel Fulcher
13. Mick Galwey
14. Simon Geoghegan
15. Eddie Halvey
16. Niall Hogan
17. Paddy Johns
18. Terry Kingston
19. Denis McBride
20. Brendan Mullin (c)
21. Conor O'Shea
22. Nick Popplewell
23. Jim Staples
24. David Tweed
25. Richard Wallace
26. Keith Wood
27. Niall Woods

== Scotland ==
Head coach: Jim Telfer

1. Stewart Campbell
2. Craig Chalmers
3. Damian Cronin
4. Gavin Hastings (c)
5. Scott Hastings
6. David Hilton
7. Ian Jardine
8. Craig Joiner
9. Kenny Logan
10. John Manson
11. Kenny Milne
12. Iain Morrison
13. Eric Peters
14. Bryan Redpath
15. Gregor Townsend
16. Rob Wainwright
17. Doddie Weir
18. Peter Wright

== Wales ==
Head coach: Alan Davies

1. Matthew Back
2. Tony Clement
3. Richie Collins
4. John D. Davies
5. Nigel Davies
6. Phil Davies
7. Stuart Davies
8. Ieuan Evans
9. Ricky Evans
10. Andrew Gibbs
11. Mike Griffiths
12. Michael Hall
13. Simon Hill
14. Garin Jenkins
15. Neil Jenkins
16. Spencer John
17. Derwyn Jones
18. Robert Jones
19. Emyr Lewis
20. Gareth Llewellyn (c)
21. Rupert Moon
22. Wayne Proctor
23. Hemi Taylor
24. Mark Taylor
25. Nigel Walker
26. Hugh Williams-Jones
