= 1992 Five Nations Championship squads =

Rugby union competition squads

== England ==
Head coach: Geoff Cooke

1. Rob Andrew
2. Martin Bayfield
3. Will Carling (c.)
4. Wade Dooley
5. Jeremy Guscott
6. Simon Halliday
7. Nigel Heslop
8. Jason Leonard
9. Brian Moore
10. Dewi Morris
11. David Pears
12. Jeff Probyn
13. Dean Richards
14. Tim Rodber
15. Mick Skinner
16. Rory Underwood
17. Jonathan Webb
18. Peter Winterbottom

== France ==
Head coach: Pierre Berbizier

1. Louis Armary
2. Laurent Cabannes
3. Jean-Marie Cadieu
4. Marc Cécillon
5. Philippe Gallart
6. Fabien Galthié
7. Jean-Pierre Genet
8. Philippe Gimbert
9. Aubin Hueber
10. Jean-Baptiste Lafond
11. Grégoire Lascubé
12. Franck Mesnel
13. Vincent Moscato
14. Christophe Mougeot
15. Alain Penaud
16. Olivier Roumat
17. Jean-Luc Sadourny
18. Philippe Saint-André
19. Philippe Sella (c.)
20. Jean-François Tordo
21. Andries van Heerden
22. Sébastien Viars

== Ireland ==
Head coach: Ciaran Fitzgerald

1. Fergus Aherne
2. Keith Crossan
3. David Curtis
4. Phil Danaher (c.)**
5. Des Fitzgerald
6. Mick Fitzgibbon
7. Neil Francis
8. Mick Galwey
9. Simon Geoghegan
10. Garret Halpin
11. Paul Hogan
12. Ralph Keyes
13. Donal Lenihan
14. Phillip Matthews (c.)*
15. Derek McAleese
16. Brendan Mullin
17. Kenny Murphy
18. Nick Popplewell
19. Brian Rigney
20. Brian Robinson
21. Rob Saunders
22. Steve Smith
23. Jim Staples
24. Richard Wallace

*captain in the first three games **captain in the last game

== Scotland ==
Head coach: Jim Telfer

1. Paul Burnell
2. Craig Chalmers
3. Neil Edwards
4. Gavin Hastings
5. Scott Hastings
6. Peter Jones
7. Sean Lineen
8. Dave McIvor
9. Kenny Milne
10. Iain Morrison
11. Andy Nicol
12. Ian Smith
13. David Sole (c.)
14. Tony Stanger
15. Ivan Tukalo
16. Rob Wainwright
17. Doddie Weir
18. Derek White

== Wales ==
Head coach: Alan Davies

1. Roger Bidgood
2. Tony Clement
3. Tony Copsey
4. Stuart Davies
5. Laurance Delaney
6. Ieuan Evans (c.)
7. Scott Gibbs
8. Mike Griffiths
9. Michael Hall
10. Garin Jenkins
11. Neil Jenkins
12. Robert Jones
13. Emyr Lewis
14. Gareth Llewellyn
15. Martyn Morris
16. Mike Rayer
17. Colin Stephens
18. Richard Webster
19. Hugh Williams-Jones
