= 1993 Wales rugby union tour of Zimbabwe and Namibia =

- Manager: Bob Norster
- Coach: Alan Davies
- Tour captain: Gareth Llewellyn
Summary
P	W	D	L
Total
6	6	0	0
Test match
3	3	0	0
Opponent
P	W	D	L
Zimbabwe
2	2	0	0
Namibia
1	1	0	0

Tour chronology
- ← 1991 Australia 1994 Canada/Oceania →

The Wales national rugby union team toured southern Africa in May and June 1993. They played six matches, including two tests against Zimbabwe and one against Namibia. They won all six matches on the tour, culminating with a 56–17 win over the South African Barbarians.

The team was very experimental, as some of the best Welsh players were involved in the Lions tour to New Zealand. Three players made their test debuts in the first game against Zimbabwe: Simon Hill, Lyn Jones and Neil Boobyer.

== Matches ==
Date	Venue	Home	Score	Away
22 May 1993	Hartsfield Rugby Grounds, Bulawayo	Zimbabwe	14–35	Wales
25 May 1993	Harare	Zimbabwe B	13–64	Welsh XV
29 May 1993	Police Grounds, Harare	Zimbabwe	13–42	Wales
2 June 1993	Windhoek	Namibia B	10–47	Welsh XV
5 June 1993	Hage Geingob Rugby Stadium, Windhoek	Namibia	23–38	Wales
9 June 1993	Windhoek	South African Barbarians	17–56	Welsh XV

=== Zimbabwe vs Wales (1st test) ===
22 May 1993

Zimbabwe	14–35	Wales
Try: Olonga; Pen: Walters (3)	Report 1 Report 2	Try: Moon; Hill; Proctor; P. Davies; Con: Jenkins (3); Pen: Jenkins (2); Drop: A. Davies

Hartsfield Rugby Grounds, Bulawayo
Referee: Ian Rogers (South Africa)

FB	15	Ian Noble
RW	14	Dave Nash
OC	13	Mark Letcher
IC	12	Dave Walters (c)
LW	11	Victor Olonga
FH	10	Craig Brown
SH	9	Sean Day
N8	8	Enrico Fargnoli
OF	7	Brendon Dawson
BF	6	Shaun Landman
RL	5	Tendayi Tabvuma
LL	4	Rob Demblon
TP	3	Adrian Garvey
HK	2	Brian Beattie
LP	1	Gary Snyder
Coach:
(Saint Kitts and Nevis) Colin Osborne

FB	15	Mike Rayer
RW	14	Simon Hill
OC	13	Roger Bidgood
IC	12	Neil Jenkins
LW	11	Wayne Proctor	(substituted off) 48'
FH	10	Adrian Davies
SH	9	Rupert Moon
N8	8	Emyr Lewis	(substituted off) 77'
OF	7	Lyn Jones
BF	6	Mark Perego
RL	5	Gareth Llewellyn (c)
LL	4	Phil Davies
TP	3	Hugh Williams-Jones
HK	2	Andrew Lamerton
LP	1	Mike Griffiths
Replacements:
CE		Neil Boobyer	(substituted on) 48'
N8		Stuart Davies	(substituted on) 77'
Coach:
Alan Davies

=== Zimbabwe B vs Wales ===
25 May 1993

Zimbabwe B	13–64	Welsh XV
Try: Kirkman (2); Pen: Veldman		Try: I. Jones (2); Rayer (2); Arnold; Buckett; Hill; Howley; Jenkins; Woodland; Con: Jenkins (7)

Harare

=== Zimbabwe vs Wales (2nd test) ===
29 May 1993

Zimbabwe	13–42	Wales
Try: Olonga; Con: Noble; Pen: Noble (2)	Report 1 Report 2	Try: Llewellyn (2); Bidgood; S. Davies; J. Davies; Jenkins; Con: Jenkins (3); Pen: Jenkins (2)

Police Grounds, Harare
Referee: Ian Anderson (South Africa)

FB	15	Ian Noble
RW	14	William Schultz
OC	13	Mark Letcher
IC	12	Dave Walters (c)
LW	11	Victor Olonga
FH	10	Craig Brown
SH	9	Ewan MacMillan
N8	8	David Kirkman
OF	7	Brendon Dawson
BF	6	Shaun Landman
RL	5	Tendayi Tabvuma
LL	4	Rob Demblon
TP	3	Adrian Garvey
HK	2	Brian Beattie
LP	1	Gary Snyder
Coach:
(Saint Kitts and Nevis) Colin Osborne

FB	15	Neil Jenkins
RW	14	Simon Hill
OC	13	Roger Bidgood
IC	12	Neil Boobyer
LW	11	Wayne Proctor
FH	10	Adrian Davies
SH	9	Rupert Moon
N8	8	Emyr Lewis
OF	7	Lyn Jones
BF	6	Stuart Davies
RL	5	Gareth Llewellyn (c)
LL	4	Paul Arnold
TP	3	John Davies
HK	2	Andrew Lamerton
LP	1	Mike Griffiths
Coach:
Alan Davies

=== Namibia B vs Wales ===
2 June 1993

Namibia B	10–47	Welsh XV
Try: Grous; Con: Horn; Pen: Horn		Try: Proctor (2); Boobyer (2); Rayer; McBryde; Howley; Con: Jenkins (6)

Windhoek

=== Namibia vs Wales ===
5 June 1993

Namibia	23–38	Wales
Try: Coetzee; Kotze; Con: Coetzee (2); Pen: Coetzee (3)	Report	Try: Lewis (2); Proctor; Hill; Moon; Con: Jenkins (2); Pen: Jenkins (3)

Hage Geingob Rugby Stadium, Windhoek
Referee: Ken McCartney (Scotland)

FB	15	Jaco Coetzee
RW	14	Gerhard Mans (c)
OC	13	Henning Snyman
IC	12	Michael Marais
LW	11	Eden Meyer
FH	10	Migiel Booysen
SH	9	Basie Buitendag
N8	8	Khaki Goosen
OF	7	Henry Brink
BF	6	Barries Barnard
RL	5	Bernard Malgas
LL	4	Dirk Kotze
TP	3	Abe van Wyk
HK	2	Stephan Smith
LP	1	Cassie Derks
Coach:
unknown

FB	15	Mike Rayer
RW	14	Simon Hill
OC	13	Neil Boobyer
IC	12	Roger Bidgood
LW	11	Wayne Proctor
FH	10	Neil Jenkins
SH	9	Rupert Moon
N8	8	Emyr Lewis	Substituted off
OF	7	Lyn Jones
BF	6	Stuart Davies
RL	5	Gareth Llewellyn (c)
LL	4	Phil Davies
TP	3	Hugh Williams-Jones
HK	2	Andrew Lamerton
LP	1	Mike Griffiths
Replacements:
FL		Mark Perego
Coach:
Alan Davies

=== South African Barbarians vs Wales ===
9 June 1993

South African Barbarians	17–56	Welsh XV
Try: Barnard; Stransky; Con: Stransky (2); Pen: Stransky		Try: I. Jones (2); P. Davies; A. Davies; S. Davies; J. Davies; Perego; Proctor; Con: Jenkins (5); Pen: Jenkins (2)

Windhoek

== Squad ==
Name	Position	Club	Notes
Gareth Llewellyn	Lock	Neath	Captain
Andrew Lamerton	Hooker	Llanelli	
Robin McBryde	Hooker	Swansea	
Ian Buckett	Prop	Swansea	
John Davies	Prop	Neath	
Mike Griffiths	Prop	Cardiff	
Hugh Williams-Jones	Prop	South Wales Police	
Paul Arnold	Lock	Swansea	
Tony Copsey	Lock	Llanelli	
Phil Davies	Lock	Llanelli	
Stuart Davies	Back row	Swansea	
Lyn Jones	Back row	Llanelli	
Emyr Lewis	Back row	Llanelli	
Mark Perego	Back row	Llanelli	
Andrew Williams	Back row	Maesteg	
Rob Howley	Scrum-half	Bridgend	Replacement
Robert Jones	Scrum-half	Swansea	Replaced by Rob Howley
Rupert Moon	Scrum-half	Llanelli	
Huw Woodland	Scrum-half	Neath	Replacement
Adrian Davies	Fly-half	Cardiff	
Neil Jenkins	Fly-half	Pontypridd	
Roger Bidgood	Centre	Newport	Replacement
Neil Boobyer	Centre	Llanelli	
Nigel Davies	Centre	Llanelli	Replaced by Roger Bidgood
Mike Hall	Centre	Cardiff	Replaced by Huw Woodland
Simon Hill	Wing	Cardiff	Replacement
Wayne Proctor	Wing	Llanelli	
Nigel Walker	Wing	Cardiff	Replaced by Simon Hill
Ian Jones	Full-back	Llanelli	
Mike Rayer	Full-back	Cardiff	
