= 1994 Wales rugby union tour of Canada and Oceania =

- Manager: Bob Norster
- Coach: Alan Davies
- Tour captain: Ieuan Evans
Summary
P	W	D	L
Total
5	4	0	1
Test match
4	3	0	1
Opponent
P	W	D	L
Canada
1	1	0	0
Fiji
1	1	0	0
Tonga
1	1	0	0
Western Samoa
1	0	0	1

Tour chronology
- ← 1993 Africa 1995 South Africa →

The Wales national rugby union team toured Canada and Oceania in June 1994. They played five matches, including tests against Canada, Fiji, Tonga and Western Samoa. They won each of their first four matches, beginning with a tour match victory over the Canada A team, before losing to Samoa in their final game.

== Matches ==
Date	Venue	Home	Score	Away
8 June 1994	Mohawk Sports Park, Hamilton, Ontario	Canada A	19–28	Wales
11 June 1994	Fletcher's Fields, Markham, Ontario	Canada	15–33	Wales
18 June 1994	National Stadium, Suva	Fiji	8–23	Wales
22 June 1994	Teufaiva Sport Stadium, Nukuʻalofa	Tonga	9–18	Wales
25 June 1994	Chanel College, Apia	Western Samoa	34–9	Wales

=== Canada A vs Wales ===
8 June 1994

Canada A	19–28	Wales
Try: MacKinnon; Con: Ross; Pen: Ross (4)		Try: Manley; Arnold; Clement; Con: N. Jenkins (2); Pen: N. Jenkins (3)

Mohawk Sports Park, Hamilton, Ontario

=== Canada vs Wales ===
11 June 1994

Canada	15–33	Wales
Pen: Rees (5)		Try: Hall (2); I. Evans; Con: N. Jenkins (3); Pen: N. Jenkins (4)

Fletcher's Fields, Markham, Ontario
Referee: Ian Rogers (South Africa)

FB	15	Scott Stewart
RW	14	Ron Toews
OC	13	Steve Gray
IC	12	Ian Stuart (c)
LW	11	Dave Lougheed
FH	10	Gareth Rees
SH	9	John Graf
N8	8	Colin McKenzie	Substituted off
OF	7	Ian Gordon
BF	6	Gord MacKinnon
RL	5	Mike James
LL	4	Al Charron
TP	3	Dan Jackart
HK	2	Karl Svoboda
LP	1	Eddie Evans
Replacements:
SH	16	Ian MacKay
CE	17	Bobby Ross
HK	18	Danny Nikas
N8	19	Glenn Ennis	Substituted on
FL	20	Bruce Breen
PR	21	Richard Bice
Coach:
(England) Ian Birtwell

FB	15	Mike Rayer
RW	14	Ieuan Evans (c)	Substituted off
OC	13	Mike Hall
IC	12	Nigel Davies
LW	11	Wayne Proctor
FH	10	Neil Jenkins
SH	9	Rupert Moon
N8	8	Scott Quinnell
OF	7	Richie Collins
BF	6	Hemi Taylor
RL	5	Gareth Llewellyn
LL	4	Phil Davies
TP	3	John Davies
HK	2	Garin Jenkins
LP	1	Ricky Evans
Replacements:
SH	16	Paul John
FH	17	Adrian Davies
FB	18	Tony Clement	Substituted on
HK	19	Robin McBryde
PR	20	Hugh Williams-Jones
FL	21	Steve Williams
Coach:
Alan Davies

=== Fiji vs Wales ===
18 June 1994

Fiji	8–23	Wales
Try: Veitayaki; Pen: Bogisa		Try: Rayer; Collins; Con: A. Davies (2); Pen: A. Davies (3)

National Stadium, Suva
Referee: Ephraim Sklar (Argentina)

FB	15	Rasolosolo Bogisa
RW	14	Joeli Vidiri
OC	13	Joni Toloi
IC	12	Esala Nauga
LW	11	Patiliai Tuidraki
FH	10	Filipe Rayasi
SH	9	Jason McLennan
N8	8	Alfie Mocelutu
OF	7	Jonas Campbell
BF	6	Sitaveni Matalulu
RL	5	Ilaitia Savai
LL	4	Ifereimi Tawake (c)
TP	3	Joeli Veitayaki
HK	2	Eminoni Batimala
LP	1	Ron Williams
Replacements:
FL		Marika Korovou
Coach:
Meli Kurisaru

FB	15	Mike Rayer
RW	14	Ieuan Evans (c)
OC	13	Neil Boobyer
IC	12	Nigel Davies
LW	11	Wayne Proctor
FH	10	Adrian Davies
SH	9	Rupert Moon
N8	8	Emyr Lewis	Substituted off
OF	7	Richie Collins
BF	6	Hemi Taylor
RL	5	Paul Arnold
LL	4	Tony Copsey
TP	3	Hugh Williams-Jones
HK	2	Robin McBryde
LP	1	Ricky Evans
Replacements:
LK		Phil Davies	Substituted on
Coach:
Alan Davies

=== Tonga vs Wales ===
22 June 1994

Tonga	9–18	Wales
Pen: Tuipulotu (3)		Pen: N. Jenkins (6)

Teufaiva Sport Stadium, Nukuʻalofa
Referee: Ephraim Sklar (Argentina)

FB	15	Sateki Tuipulotu
RW	14	Tevita Vaʻenuku
OC	13	Martin Manukia
IC	12	Penieli Latu
LW	11	Semi Taupeaafe
FH	10	Elisi Vunipola
SH	9	Manu Vunipola
N8	8	Tasi Vikilani
OF	7	Kati Tuipulotu
BF	6	Teutau Lotoʻahea
RL	5	Valai Taumoepeau
LL	4	Falamani Mafi
TP	3	Unaloto Fa
HK	2	Feʻao Vunipola (c)
LP	1	Takau Lutua
Coach:
Sione Taumoepeau

FB	15	Tony Clement
RW	14	Ieuan Evans (c)
OC	13	Mike Hall	Substituted off
IC	12	Neil Boobyer
LW	11	Gwilym Wilkins
FH	10	Neil Jenkins
SH	9	Paul John
N8	8	Steve Williams
OF	7	Richie Collins
BF	6	Hemi Taylor
RL	5	Gareth Llewellyn
LL	4	Tony Copsey
TP	3	Hugh Williams-Jones
HK	2	Garin Jenkins
LP	1	Ian Buckett
Replacements:
CE		Nigel Davies	Substituted on
Coach:
Alan Davies

=== Western Samoa vs Wales ===
25 June 1994

Western Samoa	34–9	Wales
Try: Lima (2); Lam; Con: Kellett (2); Pen: Kellett (5)		Pen: N. Jenkins (3)

Chanel College, Apia
Referee: Barry Leask (Australia)

FB	15	Andrew Aiolupo
RW	14	Brian Lima
OC	13	Kini Vaega
IC	12	Freddie Tuilagi
LW	11	Toa Samania
FH	10	Darren Kellett
SH	9	Va'apu'u Vitale
N8	8	Pat Lam	Substituted off
OF	7	Sila Vaifale
BF	6	Malaki Iupeli
RL	5	Mata'afa Keenan	Substituted off
LL	4	Mark Birtwistle
TP	3	George Latu
HK	2	Tala Leiasamaivao
LP	1	Peter Fatialofa (c)
Replacements:
FL		Sam Kaleta	Substituted on
FL		Dylan Mika	Substituted on
Coach:
Peter Schuster

FB	15	Mike Rayer
RW	14	Ieuan Evans (c)
OC	13	Tony Clement
IC	12	Nigel Davies
LW	11	Wayne Proctor
FH	10	Neil Jenkins
SH	9	Rupert Moon
N8	8	Scott Quinnell	Substituted off
OF	7	Richie Collins
BF	6	Emyr Lewis
RL	5	Gareth Llewellyn
LL	4	Phil Davies	Substituted off
TP	3	John Davies
HK	2	Garin Jenkins
LP	1	Ricky Evans	Substituted off
Replacements:
PR		Hugh Williams-Jones	Substituted on
LK		Tony Copsey	Substituted on
FL		Hemi Taylor	Substituted on
Coach:
Alan Davies

== Squad ==
Name	Position	Club	Notes
Ieuan Evans	Wing	Llanelli	Captain
Garin Jenkins	Hooker	Swansea	
Robin McBryde	Hooker	Swansea	
Ian Buckett	Prop	Swansea	
John Davies	Prop	Neath	
Ricky Evans	Prop	Llanelli	
Hugh Williams-Jones	Prop	Llanelli	
Paul Arnold	Lock	Swansea	
Tony Copsey	Lock	Llanelli	
Phil Davies	Lock	Llanelli	
Gareth Llewellyn	Lock	Neath	
Richie Collins	Back row	Pontypridd	
Emyr Lewis	Back row	Llanelli	
Scott Quinnell	Back row	Llanelli	
Hemi Taylor	Back row	Cardiff	
Steve Williams	Back row	Neath	
Paul John	Scrum-half	Pontypridd	
Rupert Moon	Scrum-half	Llanelli	
Adrian Davies	Fly-half	Cardiff	
Neil Jenkins	Fly-half	Pontypridd	
Neil Boobyer	Centre	Llanelli	
Nigel Davies	Centre	Llanelli	
Mike Hall	Centre	Cardiff	
Dai Manley	Wing	Pontypridd	
Wayne Proctor	Wing	Llanelli	
Gwilym Wilkins	Wing	Bridgend	
Tony Clement	Full-back	Swansea	
Mike Rayer	Full-back	Cardiff	
