= 1995 Five Nations Championship =

Rugby Union tournament

- Date: 21 January – 18 March 1995
- Countries: England; Ireland; France; Scotland; Wales

Tournament statistics
- Champions: England (21st title)
- Grand Slam: England (11th title)
- Triple Crown: England (18th title)
- Matches played: 10
- Tries scored: 31 (3.1 per match)
- Top point scorer: (England) Rob Andrew (53 points)
- Top try scorer: (France) Philippe Saint-André (4 tries)

The 1995 Five Nations Championship was the 66th Five Nations Championship, the annual Northern Hemisphere rugby union competition contested by the national teams of England, France, Ireland, Scotland and Wales. It was also the last Five Nations held in the sport's amateur era, as rugby union's governing body, the International Rugby Football Board, opened the sport to professionalism on August 26 of that year. Including the previous incarnations as the Home Nations and Five Nations, this was the hundred-and-first series of the northern hemisphere rugby union championship. Ten matches were played over five weekends from 21 January to 18 March. It was also the fifth occasion, after 1978, 1984, 1990 and 1991, on which two teams each with three victories faced off against each other in the final round of matches, with both capable of completing a Grand Slam with a victory, and the second time that the Triple Crown had also been at stake at the same time, as a result of England and Scotland's earlier victories over the other Home Nations. The tournament took a surprisingly similar course to five years earlier, where England and Scotland both won their first three matches and met in the final week, with an undefeated record, a Grand Slam, Triple Crown and the Calcutta Cup all at stake for the victor: however, this time it was England who prevailed in the deciding match. Even the minor placings were the same as in 1990, as France came third, Ireland fourth and Wales were whitewashed.

== Participants ==
The teams involved were:

Nation	Venue	City	Head coach	Captain
England	Twickenham	London	Jack Rowell	Will Carling
France	Parc des Princes	Paris	Pierre Berbizier	Philippe Saint-André
Ireland	Lansdowne Road	Dublin	Gerry Murphy	Brendan Mullin
Scotland	Murrayfield	Edinburgh	Jim Telfer	Gavin Hastings
Wales	National Stadium	Cardiff	Alan Davies	Gareth Llewellyn

== Table ==
Pos	Team	Pld	W	D	L	PF	PA	PD	Pts
1	England	4	4	0	0	98	39	+59	8
2	Scotland	4	3	0	1	87	71	+16	6
3	France	4	2	0	2	77	70	+7	4
4	Ireland	4	1	0	3	44	83	−39	2
5	Wales	4	0	0	4	43	86	−43	0

== Results ==
21 January 1995

France	21–9	Wales
Try: Ntamack; Saint-André; Con: Lacroix; Pen: Lacroix (3)	Report	Pen: Jenkins (3)

Parc des Princes, Paris
Attendance: 45,400
Referee: J. J. M. Pearson (England)

21 January 1995

Ireland	8–20	England
Try: Foley; Pen: Burke	Report	Try: Carling; Clarke; T. Underwood; Con: Andrew; Pen: Andrew

Lansdowne Road, Dublin
Referee: P. Thomas (France)

4 February 1995

England	31–10	France
Try: Guscott; T. Underwood (2); Con: Andrew (2); Pen: Andrew (4)	Report	Try: Viars; Con: Lacroix; Pen: Lacroix

Twickenham, London
Attendance: 59,450
Referee: Ken McCartney (Scotland)

4 February 1995

Scotland	26–13	Ireland
Try: Cronin; Joiner; Con: G. Hastings (2); Pen: G. Hastings (4)	Report	Try: Bell; Mullin; Pen: Burke

Murrayfield, Edinburgh
Referee: Derek Bevan (Wales)

18 February 1995

France	21–23	Scotland
Try: Sadourny; Saint-André (2); Pen: Lacroix; Drop: Deylaud	Report	Try: G. Hastings; Townsend; Con: G. Hastings (2); Pen: G. Hastings (3)

Parc des Princes, Paris
Referee: David McHugh (Ireland)

18 February 1995
15:05

Wales	9–23	England
Pen: Jenkins (3)	Report	Try: Ubogu; R. Underwood (2); Con: Andrew; Pen: Andrew (2)

National Stadium, Cardiff
Referee: D. Mené (France)

4 March 1995

Ireland	7–25	France
Try: Geoghegan; Con: Elwood	Report	Try: Cecillon; Y. Delaigue; Ntamack; Saint-André; Con: Ntamack; Pen: Ntamack

Lansdowne Road, Dublin
Attendance: 62,000
Referee: C. Thomas (Wales)

4 March 1995

Scotland	26–13	Wales
Try: Hilton; Peters; Con: G. Hastings (2); Pen: G. Hastings (4)	Report	Try: Jones; Con: Jenkins; Pen: Jenkins (2)

Murrayfield, Edinburgh
Referee: S. J. Lander (England)

18 March 1995

England	24–12	Scotland
Pen: Andrew (7); Drop: Andrew		Pen: G. Hastings (2); Drop: Chalmers (2)

Twickenham, London
Referee: B. W. Stirling (Ireland)

18 March 1995

Wales	12–16	Ireland
Pen: Jenkins (4)		Try: Mullin; Con: Burke; Pen: Burke (2); Drop: Burke

National Stadium, Cardiff
Referee: R. J. Megson (Scotland)
