= 1994 Five Nations Championship =

Rugby union competition

- Date: 15 January – 19 March 1994
- Countries: England; Ireland; France; Scotland; Wales

Tournament statistics
- Champions: Wales (22nd title)
- Matches played: 10
- Tries scored: 20 (2 per match)
- Top point scorer: (Wales) Neil Jenkins (48 points)
- Top try scorers: (France) Philippe Saint-André (Wales) Nigel Walker (Wales) Mike Rayer (2 tries)

The 1994 Five Nations Championship was the 65th series of the Five Nations Championship, an annual rugby union competition between the major Northern Hemisphere rugby union national teams. The tournament consisted of ten matches held between 15 January and 19 March 1994.

The tournament was the 65th in its then format as the Five Nations. Including the competition's former incarnation as the Home Nations Championship, the 1994 Five Nations Championship was the 100th Northern Hemisphere rugby union championship.

The championship was contested by England, France, Ireland, Scotland and Wales. It was the first time that the Five Nations championship title was decided by using points difference to separate the top two teams that finished level on win–loss record. Wales won the tournament, with England needing a 16-point margin of victory over Wales in the final match to snatch the tournament themselves, but fell short, conceding a late Welsh try while pressing for the score that would have given them a big enough margin. Earlier in the tournament, England won the Calcutta Cup beating Scotland at Murrayfield. In a comparatively low scoring tournament, England then surprisingly lost at home to Ireland, ending their own hopes of a Grand Slam. Scotland performed poorly throughout and although somewhat unfortunate to lose to England, were heavily defeated by Wales in their opening match and could only manage a draw against Ireland, before being beaten by France at home in their final fixture. The overall result was, however, Wales' 22nd outright victory, including seven victories in the Home Nations, excluding eleven titles shared with other countries. England and France placed second and third with three and two wins respectively. Ireland placed fourth, with Scotland, last. None of the Home Nations achieved the Triple Crown.

Wales missed out on a ninth Grand Slam after losing to England at Twickenham.

== Participants ==
The teams involved were:

Nation	Venue	City	Head coach	Captain
England	Twickenham	London	Geoff Cooke	Will Carling
France	Parc des Princes	Paris	Pierre Berbizier	Olivier Roumat/Philippe Saint-André
Ireland	Lansdowne Road	Dublin	Gerry Murphy	Michael Bradley
Scotland	Murrayfield	Edinburgh	Jim Telfer	Gavin Hastings
Wales	National Stadium	Cardiff	Alan Davies	Ieuan Evans/Gareth Llewellyn

== Table ==
Pos	Team	Pld	W	D	L	PF	PA	PD	Pts
1	Wales	4	3	0	1	78	51	+27	6
2	England	4	3	0	1	60	49	+11	6
3	France	4	2	0	2	84	69	+15	4
4	Ireland	4	1	1	2	49	70	−21	3
5	Scotland	4	0	1	3	38	70	−32	1

== Results ==
1994-01-15 14:30

France	35 - 15	Ireland
Tries: Benetton; Lacroix; Merle; Saint-André; Con: Lacroix (3); Pen: Lacroix (3)		Pen: Elwood (5)

Parc des Princes, Paris
Referee: J. M. Fleming (Scotland)

1994-01-15 14:30

Wales	29 - 6	Scotland
Tries: I. Evans; Rayer (2); Con: N. Jenkins; Pen: N. Jenkins (4)		Pen: G. Hastings (2)

National Stadium, Cardiff
Referee: P. Robin (France)

1994-02-05 14:30

Ireland	15 - 17	Wales
Pen: Elwood (5)		Tries: N. Jenkins; Pen: N. Jenkins (4)

Lansdowne Road, Dublin
Referee: A. J. Spreadbury (England)

1994-02-05 14:30

Scotland	14 - 15	England
Tries: Wainwright; Pen: G. Hastings (2); Drops: Townsend		Pen: Callard (5)

Murrayfield, Edinburgh
Referee: L. L. McLachlan (New Zealand)

1994-02-19 14:30

England	12 - 13	Ireland
Pen: Callard (4)		Tries: Geoghegan; Con: Elwood; Pen: Elwood (2)

Twickenham, London
Referee: P. Thomas (France)

1994-02-19 14:30

Wales	24 - 15	France
Tries: Quinnell; Walker; Con: N. Jenkins; Pen: N. Jenkins (4)		Tries: Roumat; Sella; Con: Lacroix; Pen: Lacroix

National Stadium, Cardiff
Attendance: 52,000
Referee: L. L. McLachlan (New Zealand)

1994-03-05 14:30

France	14 - 18	England
Tries: Benazzi; Pen: Lacroix (3)		Pen: Andrew (5); Drops: Andrew

Parc des Princes, Paris
Referee: S. R. Hilditch (Ireland)

1994-03-05 14:30

Ireland	6 - 6	Scotland
Pen: Elwood (2)		Pen: G. Hastings (2)

Lansdowne Road, Dublin
Referee: E. F. Morrison (England)

1994-03-19 14:30

England	15 - 8	Wales
Tries: Rodber; R. Underwood; Con: Andrew; Pen: Andrew		Tries: Walker; Pen: N. Jenkins

Twickenham, London
Referee: J. M. Fleming (Scotland)

1994-03-19 14:30

Scotland	12 - 20	France
Pen: G. Hastings (4)		Tries: Sadourny; Saint-André; Con: Lacroix; Montlaur; Pen: Lacroix (2)

Murrayfield, Edinburgh
Attendance: 49,000
Referee: W. D. Bevan (Wales)
