= 1993 Five Nations Championship =

Rugby union competition

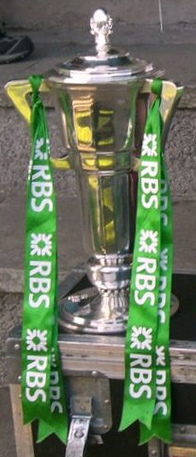
- The Five Nations Championship winners trophy, first awarded in 1993.
- Date: 16 January – 20 March 1993
- Countries: England; Ireland; France; Scotland; Wales

Tournament statistics
- Champions: France (10th title)
- Matches played: 10
- Tries scored: 20 (2 per match)
- Top point scorer: (Scotland) Gavin Hastings (32 points)
- Top try scorer: (France) Philippe Saint-André (3 tries)

The 1993 Five Nations Championship was the 64th series of the Five Nations Championship, an annual rugby union competition between the major Northern Hemisphere rugby union national teams. The tournament consisted of 10 matches held between 16 January and 20 March 1993.

The tournament was the 64th in its then format as the Five Nations. Including the competition's former incarnation as the Home Nations Championship, the 1993 Five Nations Championship was the 99th Northern Hemisphere rugby union championship.

The championship was contested by England, France, Ireland, Scotland and Wales. France won the tournament, although a 16–15 opening defeat by England meant they failed to win the Grand Slam. The overall result was, however, France's tenth outright victory in the Five Nations, excluding seven titles shared with other countries. Scotland, England and Ireland placed second, third and fourth respectively with two wins each, while Wales placed last with a one-point victory over England. England won the Calcutta Cup, while none of the Home Nations achieved the Triple Crown.

For the first time, a trophy was awarded to the winning team.

== Participants ==
Nation	Venue	City	Head coach	Captain
England	Twickenham Stadium	London	Geoff Cooke	Will Carling
France	Parc des Princes	Paris	Pierre Berbizier	Jean-François Tordo
Ireland	Lansdowne Road	Dublin	Gerry Murphy	Michael Bradley
Scotland	Murrayfield Stadium	Edinburgh	Jim Telfer	Gavin Hastings
Wales	National Stadium	Cardiff	Alan Davies	Ieuan Evans

== Table ==
Pos	Team	Pld	W	D	L	PF	PA	PD	Pts
1	France	4	3	0	1	73	35	+38	6
2	Scotland	4	2	0	2	50	40	+10	4
3	England	4	2	0	2	54	54	0	4
4	Ireland	4	2	0	2	45	53	−8	4
5	Wales	4	1	0	3	34	74	−40	2

== Results ==
16 January 1993
15:05

England	16–15	France
Tries: Hunter; Con: Webb; Pen: Webb (3)		Tries: Saint-André (2); Con: Camberabero; Pen: Camberabero

Twickenham Stadium, London
Attendance: 50 000
Referee: J. M. Fleming (Scotland)

16 January 1993
15:05

Scotland	15–3	Ireland
Tries: Stanger; Stark; Con: G. Hastings; Pen: G. Hastings		Pen: Malone

Murrayfield Stadium, Edinburgh
Referee: E. F. Morrison (England)

6 February 1993
15:05

France	11–3	Scotland
Tries: Lacroix; Pen: Camberabero (2)		Pen: G. Hastings

Parc des Princes, Paris
Attendance: 49 026
Referee: W. D. Bevan (Wales)

6 February 1993
15:05

Wales	10–9	England
Tries: I. Evans; Con: N. Jenkins; Pen: N. Jenkins		Pen: Webb (2); Drops: Guscott

National Stadium, Cardiff
Referee: J. Dume (France)

20 February 1993
15:05

Ireland	6–21	France
Pen: Malone (2)		Tries: Saint-André; Sella; Con: Camberabero; Pen: Camberabero (2); Drops: Camberabero

Lansdowne Road, Dublin
Attendance: 60 000
Referee: D. Leslie (Scotland)

20 February 1993
15:05

Scotland	20–0	Wales
Tries: Turnbull; Pen: G. Hastings (5)

Murrayfield Stadium, Edinburgh
Referee: J. Dume (France)

6 March 1993
15:05

England	26–12	Scotland
Tries: Guscott; R. Underwood; T. Underwood; Con: Webb; Pen: Webb (3)		Pen: G. Hastings (3); Drops: Chalmers

Twickenham Stadium, London
Referee: B. W. Stirling (Ireland)

6 March 1993
15:05

Wales	14–19	Ireland
Tries: I. Evans; Pen: N. Jenkins (3)		Tries: Robinson; Con: Elwood; Pen: Elwood (3); Drops: Clarke

National Stadium, Cardiff
Referee: A. R. MacNeill (Australia)

20 March 1993
15:05

France	26–10	Wales
Tries: Benetton (2); Lafond; Con: Lafond; Pen: Lacroix (3)		Tries: Walker; Con: N. Jenkins; Pen: N. Jenkins

Parc des Princes, Paris
Attendance: 49 000
Referee: O. E. Doyle (Ireland)

20 March 1993
15:05

Ireland	17–3	England
Tries: Galwey; Pen: Elwood (2); Drops: Elwood (2)		Pen: Webb

Lansdowne Road, Dublin
Referee: A. R. MacNeill (Australia)
