= Andrew Lamerton =

- Full name: Andrew Edwin Horace Lamerton
- Born: 28 May 1970 (age 56) Church Village, Wales
- Height: 6 ft 0 in (183 cm)
- Weight: 214 lb (97 kg)

Rugby union career
- Position: Hooker
International career
Years	Team	Apps	(Points)
1993	Wales	5	(0)

Andrew Edwin Horace Lamerton (born 28 May 1970) is a Welsh former rugby union international.

Born in Church Village, Lamerton attended Bryn Celynnog Comprehensive School, which also produced his future Wales teammate Neil Jenkins. He played his early rugby with Beddau RFC.

A hooker, Lamerton was playing with Llanelli at the time of his first Wales call up and made his debut against France at Parc des Princes in the 1993 Five Nations Championship. He was capped a further three times on the 1993 tour of Zimbabwe and Namibia, then later that year played in a home Test against Japan.

Lamerton's career suffered two major setbacks over the next few years, starting with when he had to withdraw from the 1994 Five Nations squad due to illness, later found to a kidney inflammation condition. He had been due to make a return in 1995 for a Wales A game, only to be involved in a serious car accident on the way to training. His skull was fractured in the collision and the next day he fell into a coma, not waking up until two weeks later.

Released by Llanelli in 1997, Lamerton continued his career at Pontypridd, but further Test caps eluded him, although he did play for Wales A in 1999. He finished his career with a stint at Worcester.

== See also ==
- List of Wales national rugby union players
