= Lyn Jones =

Wales international rugby union footballer

- Born: Richard Lyn Jones; 5 June 1964 (age 62) Cwmavon, Neath Port Talbot, Wales
- School: Ysgol Gyfun, Ystalyfera

Rugby union career
- Position: Openside flanker
Amateur team(s)
Years	Team	Apps	(Points)
1983–1990	Neath RFC		
1990–1994	Llanelli RFC	102	(66)
1994	Treorchy RFC (player/coach)		
International career
Years	Team	Apps	(Points)
1986	Wales B	2	(0)
1990	Wales A	1	(0)
1993	Wales	5	(0)
Coaching career
- Years: Team
- 1994: Treorchy RFC (player coach)
- 1994–2003: Neath RFC
- 2003–2008: Ospreys
- 2008: Ebbw Vale RFC (consultant)
- 2008–2009: NG Dragons (consultant)
- 2011–2013: London Welsh
- 2013–2016: NG Dragons (Director of Rugby)
- 2016–2018: Welwitschias
- 2018: Neath RFC (consultant)
- 2018–2021: Russia
- 2022–: Netherlands

Richard Lyn Jones (born 5 June 1964) is a Wales international rugby union former player. Originally playing as a flanker, Jones subsequently became a coach. He played most of his playing career for Neath RFC and started his coaching career at the same club. Jones has coached professional clubs in Wales and England and, in 2018, became head coach of the Russian national rugby union team. He subsequently became a coach with national rugby team of the Netherlands.

== Personal ==
His son Luc Jones is a professional rugby union player with Jersey RFC. Jones often makes punditry appearances for BBC Cymru Wales' Scrum V and coverage of Pro 14 when in Wales.

== Playing career ==
Jones began his elite playing career in 1983 for Neath RFC. At the club, he was described by Brian Thomas (Neath's team manager) as "The fittest, fastest, cleverest and best back-row forward in Britain". Towards the end of 1987, Jones suffered a severe knee injury taking him out of rugby for over a year. On returning to Neath mid-way through the 1988/89 season, Jones took a sabbatical from rugby for personal reasons. He returned to the club in March 1990 where he struggled to find form and make a way back into the side. For the 1990/91 season - the season that launched the Welsh Premiership - Jones moved to Llanelli RFC.

It was at Llanelli where Jones made more of a name for himself, achieving the Premiership title in 1993 and consecutive Welsh Cup titles in 1991, 1992 and 1993. It was in 1993 where Jones finally got his international chance for Wales, being selected for Wales' experimental tour to Africa due to the absence of the Welsh first-team players being involved in the Lions tour to New Zealand. He earned his first cap on 22 May 1993, starting at 7 against Zimbabwe. With rumoured issues within the club, Jones left Llanelli for the 1994/1995 season and joined Treorchy RFC who has just been promoted to Division 1. It was at Treorchy where Jones began to coach, acting as a player-coach for the Rhondda Valley based team.

However, following a premature end to his playing career, Jones parted way with Treorchy and return to The Gnoll to become Head Coach at Neath.

== Coaching career ==
=== Early days: Neath and Ospreys ===
Entering the start of the professional era of rugby union in Wales, Jones led Neath to qualification of the Heineken Cup. Their European form proved an advantage in the Welsh leagues, with Neath winning both the Premiership and Welsh Cup in 1996, the latter title one they reclaimed in 2001. In Neath debut season of the 1996–97 Heineken Cup, Neath narrowly missed out on a knock-out spot behind Brive and Harlequins. Jones' time at Neath saw him unlock a number of later World Class international. It was Jones that signed up an unsuccessful district scrum-half and helped turn Shane Williams in to a quality winger.

At the turn of regional rugby in 2003, Jones remained with his region to coach the collective Neath-Swansea Ospreys team. Their first season saw the team fall in the 2003–04 Heineken Cup, finishing bottom of their pool. However they showed promise in the 2003–04 Celtic League, form which they continued into the next season by claiming the 2004–05 Celtic League title. It wasn't until the 2006–07 Heineken Cup season where the Ospreys made way in the competition; despite not making the knock out round, the Ospreys had finished second in their pool and narrowly missing on finishing top or as the best runner-up. Although they did secure their second Celtic League title, after beating the Newport Gwent Dragons 27–13 to finish top of the table.

In May 2008, Jones left the region by mutual agreement, shortly after winning the EDF Anglo/ Welsh Cup against Leicester Tigers. He leaves the region after a successful 14 years as a coach with Neath that formed a large part of the region.

=== Part-time coaching ===
During the 2008/09 Welsh Premiership season, Jones acted as a part-time consultant for Ebbw Vale RFC. His dealing with the Newport Gwent Dragons coach Paul Turner while with Ebbw Vale, saw Jones later become an attack consult for the region at the back end of 2008. However the time at the region was short lived, after he left his post in February 2009 to take up a post at an Abu Dhabi school.

=== London Welsh ===
In June 2011, Jones was appointed head coach of London Welsh. He immediately gaining promotion to then Aviva Premiership for 2012/13. Jones made some good signings to make his team competitive, including Rugby World Cup winning scrum-half Piri Weepu. Their first ever game in the Premiership was against 2012 runners-up Leicester Tigers, of which they won 38–13. Their first victory came in round 3, after they beat Exeter Chiefs 25–24, with the victory backed up the following week away to Sale Sharks; 29–19. The season continued to look promising after they gained their win by the eighth round. At the halfway point of the season, London Welsh sat 12 points clear of relegation sitting in 10th place. After losing to Sale Sharks, who sat in the relegation zone, in round 15, London Welsh found themselves crashing down the table.

On 7 March 2013, London Welsh were deducted 5 points due to player registration irregularities, and the appeal was denied and the deduction upheld. This saw London Welsh fall to the bottom of the table, and in danger of relegation. Despite a final win in the last round against Worcester Warriors, London Welsh were comfortable relegated from the Premiership. Jones later left the club after the club agreed to release him a year early for personal reasons.

=== Return to Wales ===
With-in a week of leaving London Welsh, Jones joined the Newport Gwent Dragons as Director of Rugby.

His first match in charge was a 15–8 win over Ulster in the opening round of the 2013–14 Pro12 season. In round 3, Jones helped the Dragons end a 10-match losing run against the Scarlets after a comprehensive 23–16 victory. By the end of the season, Jones had improved the Dragons positioning from the previous season up to 9th on the table and with 7 wins. The 2014/15 season proved even more successful, with the advancement to the knock-out rounds of the 2014–15 European Rugby Challenge Cup, only to lose to Edinburgh 45–16 in the semi-final.

After another poor run of form in the 2015–16 Pro12, the pressure built on the Newport Gwent Dragons management. In April 2016, Jones missed the Dragons 2015–16 European Rugby Challenge Cup quarter-final win over Gloucester due to illness, and a fortnight later, Jones left the club by mutual consent after a period away through illness.

=== Welwitschias ===
In November 2016, the Namibia Rugby Union announced the appointment of Jones as the head coach of the Welwitschias – a Namibian team playing in the South Africa Currie Cup competition - where he would work with the national head coach Welshman Phil Davies. He first took the side into the 2017 Rugby Challenge before taking the team into the 2017 Currie Cup First Division. Although his side finished seventh, the competition Namibian players games of a higher level and intensity that they would receive in Namibian's own competition.

Jones remained with the side for 2018, despite also acting as a consultant for Neath RFC in February 2018 until the end of the Welsh season. Following the conclusion of the 2018 Rugby Challenge in June 2018, Jones announced he would leave the Namibian side to return home to Wales.

=== Russia ===
On leaving Namibia, Jones was due to retake the reigns as head coach at Neath RFC, until it was officially announced that Jones would become the head coach of the Russian national team ahead of the 2019 Rugby World Cup.

Jones' first match in charge was a 47–20 victory over Namibia, in what was the first meeting between the two nations hosted by Russia. He later led his side to a 17–10 defeat at the hands of his former club, the Dragons, before narrowly going down to Japan 32–27.

In Jones' first international major campaign, Russia finished fourth in the 2019 Rugby Europe Championship, with just two victories to their name; 64–7 over Belgium and 26–18 over Germany. In June 2019, Russia returned to the World Rugby Nations Cup for the first time in two years, acting as preparation for the World Cup. They finished second after beating Namibia and Argentina XV.

== Honours ==
=== Playing ===
Neath RFC

- Welsh Club Champions
  - Winners: 1990
- WRU Cup
  - Runners-up: 1984

Llanelli RFC

- Welsh Premiership
  - Winners: 1993
- WRU Cup
  - Winners: 1991, 1992, 1993

=== Coaching ===
Neath RFC

- Welsh Premiership
  - Winners: 1996
- WRU Cup
  - Winners: 1996, 2001

Ospreys

- Celtic League
  - Winners: 2005, 2007
- Anglo-Welsh Cup
  - Winners: 2008
  - Runners-up: 2007

London Welsh

- RFU Championship
  - Winners: 2012 (Promotion)

Russia

- World Rugby Nations Cup
  - Runners-up: 2019

Sporting positions
Preceded by (Ireland) Mark McDermott	Russia National Rugby Union Coach; 2018–2021	Succeeded by Vacant
