= Roger Bidgood =

Wales international rugby union player

- Full name: Roger Anthony Bidgood
- Born: 15 September 1964 (age 62) Caerphilly, Wales
- Height: 6 ft 0 in (183 cm)
- Weight: 208 lb (94 kg)

Rugby union career
- Position: Centre
International career
Years	Team	Apps	(Points)
1992–93	Wales	5	(5)

Roger Anthony Bidgood (born 15 September 1964) is a Welsh former rugby union international.

Bidgood, a Caerphilly-born centre, was a Wales Youth representative who played his early rugby with Glamorgan Wanderers and Pontypridd. He was playing for Pontypool when he got called up to debut for Wales against Ireland in the 1987 Five Nations, only for the match to be postponed following heavy snow in Cardiff. His first Wales cap didn't come until five years later, facing Scotland in the 1992 Five Nations, as a positional replacement for Neil Jenkins who was returning to fly-half. He was capped a further four times in 1993, including three matches on a tour of Zimbabwe and Namibia.

A retired firefighter, Bidgood was based at a station in the Cardiff suburb of Whitchurch and worked alongside the father of Wales flanker Sam Warburton. He has also served as a local councillor for Plaid Cymru, first on the Caerphilly County Borough Council, before winning a 2016 by-election for Caerphilly Town Council.

== See also ==
- List of Wales national rugby union players
