= Simon Hill (rugby union) =

Wales international rugby union player

- Born: Simon David Hill; 27 May 1968 (age 58) Cardiff, South Glamorgan, Wales
- Height: 5 ft 11 in (1.80 m)
- Weight: 83 kg (13 st 1 lb)

Rugby union career
- Position: Wing
Senior career
Years	Team	Apps	(Points)
1990–2000	Cardiff RFC	241	(566)
2000–2001	Bridgend RFC	10	(25)
International career
Years	Team	Apps	(Points)
1993–1997	Wales	12	(10)

Simon David Hill (born 27 May 1968) is a Welsh International rugby union player. He made twelve appearances for his country, as well as representing Cardiff RFC and Bridgend RFC in the top division of Welsh club rugby.

== Club career ==
Hill was brought up in Llantwit Major playing for the local school rugby team then youth rugby with Llantwit Major RFC. Whilst attending college in Yorkshire he played for Headingley and whenever home regularly turned out for the Llantwit Major senior teams.

He joined Cardiff RFC for the 1990/91 season. He remained with the club for ten seasons, making 241 appearances for the club. Amongst his achievements while at the club were Welsh Cup wins in 1994 and 1997, the Welsh league title in 1994/95 and reaching the Heineken Cup final in 1996. He moved to Bridgend RFC for the 2000/01 season. Hill made ten appearances in his one season for the club.

== International career ==
Hill made his international test debut in May 1993, against Zimbabwe at Bulawayo as part of Wales' 1993 summer tour, a tour held concurrently with the 1993 British Lions tour to New Zealand, which featured several Welsh internationals. Hill started all three tests of the tour; a second match against Zimbabwe in Harare and a match against Namibia, scoring a try in two of the tests. His performance earned him a place in the 1994 Five Nations Championship squad, and he made his tournament début against Ireland as a substitute. Hill continued to make appearances for Wales over the next few years, participating in the 1995 and 1996 Five Nations tournaments as well as the 1995 tour of South Africa and the 1996 tour to Australia. However he was omitted from the Wales squad for the 1995 Rugby World Cup. His final cap was against England in the 1997 Five Nations Championship.

== Outside rugby ==
Hill qualified from Cardiff School of Dentistry in 1996, and now runs a dental practice in Llantwit Major in the Vale of Glamorgan.
