= Nigel Meek =

Wales international rugby union footballer (born 1964)

- Born: 20 October 1964 (age 62) Blaina, Wales
- Height: 5 ft 10 in (1.78 m)
- Weight: 91 kg (14 st 5 lb)
- School: St Alban's School, Pontypool

Rugby union career
- Position: Hooker
Senior career
| Years | Team | Apps | (Points) |
- Ebbw Vale RFC
| 1991-1993 | Pontypool RFC | 60 | (60) |
| 1993-1994 | Pontypridd RFC | | |
| 1994-1995 | Abertillery RFC | | |
| 1995- | Newbridge RFC | | |
International career
| Years | Team | Apps | (Points) |
| 1993 | Wales | 3 | (0) |

Nigel Meek (born 20 October 1964) is a retired Welsh international rugby union player. He made three appearances for his country, as well as representing Ebbw Vale RFC, Pontypool RFC, Pontypridd RFC, Abertillery RFC and Newbridge RFC in the top division of Welsh club rugby. He also made 11 appearances for the Barbarians between 1992 and 1994, including international matches against Russia, Zimbabwe and an Australian XV.

Meek joined Pontypool for the 1991/92 season, playing two seasons for the club. Meek made his début for Wales against England in the 1993 Five Nations Championship, replacing Wales' usual first choice hooker Garin Jenkins, who had been suspended after being sent off in a league game. Wales beat England for the first time since 1989. Meek played the following two games, losses against Scotland and Ireland. He was dropped for the final game of the championship against France, and didn't play for Wales again.

Meek moved from Pontypridd RFC to newly prompted Abertillery RFC ahead of the 1994/95 season.

He was made club captain for Newbridge RFC in the 1996/97 season.

In 1995, while playing in a Fire Services cup match, Meek struck another player in the jaw. He was convicted of grievous bodily harm at Merthyr Law Courts in August 1995 by a majority verdict of ten to two, and sentenced to six months in prison at Cardiff Crown Court in September 1995.

Outside of rugby, Meek is a fire fighter in Blaina.
