= Murray Kidd =

New Zealand rugby union coach

- Born: 1953 (age 72–73) Te Kūiti, New Zealand
- School: New Plymouth Boys High School
- University: University (Manawatu)
- Occupation: Coach

Rugby union career
Amateur team(s)
Years	Team	Apps	(Points)
1973	University (Manawatu)		
Senior career
Years	Team	Apps	(Points)
1971	Taranaki		
1974-1984	King Country		
International career
Years	Team	Apps	(Points)
1973	New Zealand Universities		
1977	King Country-Wanganui		
Coaching career
- Years: Team
- 1991/92: Garryowen Football Club
- Sunday's Well
- 1994: King Country
- 1995-1996: Ireland

Murray Kidd (born 1953 in Te Kūiti) is a New Zealand former rugby union representative player and coach.

== Playing career ==
Kidd first came to prominence as a 17-year-old, being picked to play for Taranaki against the 1971 British Lions in their 9-14 loss, while still at New Plymouth Boys High School. He acquitted himself well against the likes of David Duckham.

He later played for Manawatu (University, 1973) and King Country (Piopio, 1974-84). In 1977 he played for King Country-Wanganui in their 9-60 loss against the British Lions. He also played for the New Zealand Zealand Universities in 1973 and had All Black trials in 1978 (replacing Bruce Robertson after 66 minutes), 1979 and 1981.

His first class career included 142 games and 58 tries.

== Coaching career ==
Kidd worked as a coach in Ireland, at Garryowen Football Club, in 1991/92, and at Sunday's Well, in Division Two of the AIB League.

He coached King Country in 1994, when they were placed 8th out of 9 teams in the First Division of the Air New Zealand National Provincial Championship.

He was named head coach of Ireland, on 13 October 1995, and held the office for a year, until resigning. In nine games, he won three and lost six.

== Personal life ==
He married Heather Kidd, a journalist and author of a number of rugby biographies.

Preceded by Gerry Murphy	Irish national rugby coach 1995-1997	Succeeded by Brian Ashton
