= Dave Walters (rugby union) =

- Full name: David Andrew Walters
- Born: 16 November 1968 (age 57) Salisbury, Rhodesia
- University: Graeme College

Rugby union career
- Position: Utility back
International career
Years	Team	Apps	(Points)
1990s	Zimbabwe	14+	(18+)

David Andrew Walters (born 16 November 1968) is a Zimbabwean former international rugby union player.

Walters, born in Salisbury (Harare), received his education in South Africa at Graeme College and then played rugby with Karoi, from where he received his first international call up in 1987.

A tobacco farmer, Walters was a member of Zimbabwe's side at the 1991 Rugby World Cup, where he featured on the wing in all three pool matches. He was also used in Test rugby as a centre and flyhalf. In 1993, Walters was appointed national captain and led the team in a home series against Wales.

Walters was the inaugural captain of Hull RUFC in 1992, following a merger between Hull & ER and Old Hymerians.
