= Va'apu'u Vitale =

Samoa international rugby union player

- Born: 4 December 1970 (age 55) Apia, Samoa

Rugby union career
- Position: Scrum-half
Senior career
Years	Team	Apps	(Points)
????	Vaiala		
International career
Years	Team	Apps	(Points)
1994–1995	Samoa	5	(0)

Faletoa Va'apu'u Vitale (born 4 December 1970 in Apia), also known as Va'a Vitale, is a Samoan rugby union player. He plays as a fly-half.

== Career ==
At club level, Vitale played for the Samoan club Vaiala. His first international cap was during a match against Wales, at Moamoa, on 25 June 1994, being capped five times. He was also part of the 1995 Rugby World Cup roster, although never playing any match. His last international cap was against Tonga, at Nuku'alofa, on 8 July 1995. He was also part of the winning 1992 Middlesex Sevens Western Samoa squad.

== Coaching career ==
In 2005, he was a member of the coaching staff of the Samoa U21 national team at the World Cup, in 2011 he headed the U21 national team. In 2015, he was the coach of the Tangaroa secondary school team at the Auckland Blues rugby tens invitational tournament.

== Personal life ==
Currently, he resides in Auckland, New Zealand.
