= Ken O'Connell =

Irish rugby union player

- Full name: Kenneth Dennis O'Connell
- Born: 25 July 1968 (age 58) Cork, Ireland
- Height: 6 ft 2 in (188 cm)
- Weight: 224 lb (102 kg)

Rugby union career
- Position: Flanker
International career
Years	Team	Apps	(Points)
1994	Ireland	2	(0)

Kenneth Dennis O'Connell (born 25 July 1968) is an Irish former rugby union international.

Raised in Cork, O'Connell attended Presentation Brothers College and played rugby at the school under future Ireland coach Declan Kidney. He went on to play as a blind-side flanker for Cork club Sundays Well and Munster.

On New Zealand's 1989 tour of Ireland, O'Connell was on the Munster side that played against the All Blacks and drew the ire of their captain Buck Shelford, who took him out of the game with an elbow. He had gotten under the skin of Shelford from before the match after stepping up to him during the haka.

O'Connell, who was out of action for nearly two years with a shoulder injury, got an Ireland call up in 1994, having previously represented his country at schoolboys and underage rugby. He was capped twice for Ireland in the 1994 Five Nations, against France at Parc des Princes and England at Twickenham.

During the late 1990s, O'Connell played professional rugby for London Irish and Castres.

== See also ==
- List of Ireland national rugby union players
