= Neil Edwards (rugby union) =

Scotland international rugby union player

- Born: Neil George Barry Edwards; 20 August 1964 (age 62) Carshalton, England

Rugby union career
- Position: Lock
Amateur team(s)
Years	Team	Apps	(Points)
- Rosslyn Park
- Harlequins
- Northampton Saints
Provincial / State sides
Years	Team	Apps	(Points)
- Anglo-Scots
International career
Years	Team	Apps	(Points)
1989-90	Scotland 'B'	1	(0)
1992-94	Scotland	6	(4)
–	Barbarians		

Neil Edwards (born 20 August 1964) is a former Scotland international rugby union player.

== Rugby union career ==
=== Amateur career ===
Edwards played club rugby for Rosslyn Park before moving on to Harlequins and then to Northampton Saints.

=== Provincial career ===
He played for Anglo-Scots. It was the Anglo-Scots side that drew him into Scotland's net. His grandfather George Watt from Dundee gave him the Scottish ancestry required; his grandfather notable for designing the London Planetarium!

=== International career ===
He was capped by Scotland 'B' once against Ireland 'B' on 28 December 1991.

He represented Scotland six times from 1992 to 1994. He won a place when Alex Snow, the Heriots forward, opted to go for England selection, rather than play for Scotland. Edwards took the reverse path to Snow; he was England's radar and went on their training camp in Portugal, before deciding to rather play for Scotland.

Edwards made his international debut on 18 January 1992 at Murrayfield in the Scotland vs England match. Of the 6 matches he played for his national side he was on the winning side on 4 occasions. He played his final match for Scotland on 15 January 1994 at Cardiff Arms Park in the Wales vs Scotland match.

He also played for the Barbarians. Edwards played eleven times for the Barbarians, captaining them in 1994 on their three match tour of Zimbabwe.

== Business career ==
He became a chartered surveyor.

Edwards is the Managing Director of Green Parking Ltd.
