= Mark Perego =

Wales international rugby union footballer

- Born: Mark Perego; 8 February 1964 (age 62) Winchester, Hampshire, England
- Height: 183 cm (6 ft 0 in)

Rugby union career
- Position: Flanker
Senior career
Years	Team	Apps	(Points)
1981-1997	Llanelli	187	(133)
International career
Years	Team	Apps	(Points)
1990-1994	Wales	9	(0)

Mark Perego (born 8 February 1964 in Winchester, England) is a former Wales international rugby union player. A flanker, he played club rugby for Llanelli and attained 9 caps for the Wales national rugby union team.

== Rugby ==
Perego made his Wales debut on 3 March 1990 against Scotland. He went on to be a key player in the Welsh championship-winning team of the 1994 Five Nations.

His strengths as a player included his powerful tackling and his phenomenal fitness, the latter of which he maintained through a highly effective but eccentric training regime. In a famous sequence, BBC Wales filmed him running through a river in a pink beret and chopping trees with an axe. He played 187 times for Llanelli and scored 32 tries.

Perego's nickname was Oddball and he was featured in the 2009 book Rugby's Greatest Characters.

== Personal life ==
Perego was a fireman by trade. He was previously married to Welsh international Non Evans and is the uncle of Welsh professional rugby union player Kirby Myhill.
