= Rob Saunders =

Irish rugby union player

- Born: 5 August 1968 (age 58) Nottingham, England

Rugby union career
- Position: Scrum-Half
Amateur team(s)
Years	Team	Apps	(Points)
1990-1994	London Irish		
Provincial / State sides
Years	Team	Apps	(Points)
1991-1992	Ulster		
1992-1994	Exiles		
International career
Years	Team	Apps	(Points)
1991-1994	Ireland	12	

Rob Saunders (born 5 August 1968 in Nottingham) is a former Irish rugby union international player who played as a scrum-half.

He played for the Ireland team from 1991 to 1994, winning 12 caps. He was a member of the Ireland squad at the 1991 Rugby World Cup.
