= Gerry Murphy (rugby union coach) =

Irish rugby coach

Gerry Murphy is a former Irish rugby coach and player and currently involved with Leinster Rugby as domestic team manager.

== Playing career ==
Murphy first played for Dublin University and Wanderers.

== Coaching ==
Murphy began his coaching career at Wanderers. He has coached Clontarf RFC and the Ireland U-21s. He was in charge of the senior Ireland team from 1992 to 1995, beating England, twice home and away, in 1993 and 1994. Murphy also lead Ireland to the quarter-finals of the 1995 Rugby World Cup.

He coached Terenure College RFC and Terenure College School, he was the backs coach when Terenure won the Leinster Schools Senior Cup in 2001. He also coached the Leinster A team, as well as a spell as interim coach for the Leinster senior squad following the departure of Declan Kidney midway through the 2004/05 season.

Murphy is currently the provincial domestic team manager. In this role he oversees the Leinster's underage representative strategy.

Preceded by Ciaran Fitzgerald	Irish national rugby coach 1992–1995	Succeeded by Murray Kidd
