= Philippe Gallart =

French rugby union footballer and coach

Philippe Gallart (born Béziers, 18 December 1962) is a former French rugby union footballer and coach. He played as a prop. He currently works as an architect.

Gallart played all his career at AS Béziers. He won 3 French Championships, in 1980/81, 1981/82 and 1983/83, and the Cup of France, in 1985/86. He left competition in 2000.

He had 18 caps for France, from 1990 to 1995, without ever scoring. He played at the Five Nations for 3 times, in 1992, 1994 and 1995. Gallart was also selected for the 1995 Rugby World Cup finals, playing a single game.
