= Jim Telfer =

British Lions & Scotland international rugby union player

- Born: James Telfer; 17 March 1940 (age 86) Melrose, Scotland
- Height: 1.88 m (6 ft 2 in)
- Weight: 94 kg (14 st 11 lb; 207 lb)
- University: Moray House School of Education
- Occupation: Retired rugby union coach

Rugby union career
- Position: Number eight
Amateur team(s)
Years	Team	Apps	(Points)
19??-1974	Melrose RFC		
- Correct as of 24 July 2007
Provincial / State sides
Years	Team	Apps	(Points)
1959-71	South of Scotland District		
1962	Provinces District		
International career
Years	Team	Apps	(Points)
1964-70	Scotland	22	((?))
1966-68	British Lions	6	
- Correct as of 1 March 2009
Coaching career
- Years: Team
- 1980–1984: Scotland
- 1988–1993: Scotland (Assistant coach)
- 1993–1995: Scotland
- 1995-1998: Scotland (Director of Rugby)
- 1998-1999: Scotland
- 1999–2003: Scotland (Assistant coach)
- 1983,1997: British Lions

James Telfer (born 17 March 1940) is a Scottish former rugby union coach and player. As a player, he won 21 international caps in the amateur era, also having a career as a headmaster at Hawick High School and teacher at Galashiels Academy and Forrester High School. With Sir Ian McGeechan he had success with both the Scotland national team and the British Lions.

== Playing career ==
Telfer played for Melrose RFC and was still a student when he was first selected for international duties. He later worked as a chemistry teacher. His first cap came against France at Murrayfield on 4 January 1964. His last match for Scotland was on 28 February 1970 at Lansdowne Road against Ireland.

Telfer gained twenty one caps for Scotland, and, but for injury, might have gained more. Allan Massie wrote of him:

"Telfer is a man of innate authority. (There's a wealth of quiet reserve and self-knowledge, touched by that form of self-mockery which appears as under-statement, in the way he will describe himself as being a 'dominant personality')"

Telfer played back row for Scotland and for the British Lions in 1966 and 1968. He was impressed and heavily influenced by New Zealand rugby. After a cartilage operation he slowed up. He played 23 games for the British Lions on their 1966 tour to Australia and New Zealand and 11 games on their 1968 tour to South Africa.

Between 1963 and 1967, he played 8 times for the Barbarians, scoring six points.

George Crerar said of him "The great thing about Jim Telfer is that he makes sure that if he isn't going to win the ball the other side won't get it either."

== Coaching career ==
Telfer was head coach to the British Lions on their tour of New Zealand in 1983. He was assistant coach, with particular responsibility for the forwards, on the 1997 British Lions tour to South Africa, where he made his well-known motivational 'Everest' speech to the forwards before the 1st Test.

Telfer coached Scotland to the Grand Slam in 1984 and, as assistant to Ian McGeechan, to his second Grand Slam in 1990. In his third term as head coach from 1998 to 1999, Scotland won the final Five Nations Championship.

In 2014 he was coaching the Melrose RFC Under-18 team – Melrose Wasps.

Telfer has been open about copying some New Zealand approaches to the game.

=== Scotland (1981–1984) ===
==== International matches as head coach ====
Matches (1981–1984)
Matches	Date	Opposition	Venue	Score (Sco.–Opponent)	Competition	Captain
1981
1	17 January	France	Parc des Princes, Paris	9–16	1981 Five Nations	Andy Irvine
2	7 February	Wales	Murrayfield Stadium, Edinburgh	15–6	1981 Five Nations	Andy Irvine
3	21 February	England	Twickenham, London	17–23	1981 Five Nations	Andy Irvine
4	21 March	Ireland	Murrayfield Stadium, Edinburgh	10–9	1981 Five Nations	Andy Irvine
5	13 June	New Zealand	Carisbrook, Dunedin	4–11	1981 tour	Andy Irvine
6	20 June	New Zealand	Eden Park, Auckland	15–40	1981 tour	Andy Irvine
7	26 September	Romania	Murrayfield Stadium, Edinburgh	12–6	Romania tour	Andy Irvine
8	19 December	Australia	Murrayfield Stadium, Edinburgh	24–15	Australia tour	Andy Irvine
1982
9	16 January	England	Murrayfield Stadium, Edinburgh	9–9	1982 Five Nations	Andy Irvine
10	20 February	Ireland	Lansdowne Road, Dublin	12–21	1982 Five Nations	Andy Irvine
11	6 March	France	Murrayfield Stadium, Edinburgh	16–7	1982 Five Nations	Andy Irvine
12	20 March	Wales	Arms Park, Cardiff	34–18	1982 Five Nations	Andy Irvine
13	4 July	Australia	Ballymore Stadium, Brisbane	12–7	1982 tour	Andy Irvine
14	10 July	Australia	Sydney Cricket Ground, Sydney	9–33	1982 tour	Andy Irvine
1983
15	15 January	Ireland	Murrayfield Stadium, Edinburgh	13–15	1983 Five Nations	Roy Laidlaw
16	5 February	France	Parc des Princes, Paris	15–19	1983 Five Nations	Roy Laidlaw
17	19 February	Wales	Murrayfield Stadium, Edinburgh	15–19	1983 Five Nations	Roy Laidlaw
18	5 March	England	Twickenham, London	22–12	1983 Five Nations	Jim Aitken
19	12 November	New Zealand	Murrayfield Stadium, Edinburgh	25–25	New Zealand tour	Jim Aitken
1984
20	21 January	Wales	Arms Park, Cardiff	15–9	1984 Five Nations	Jim Aitken
21	4 February	England	Murrayfield Stadium	18–6	1984 Five Nations	Jim Aitken
22	3 March	Ireland	Lansdowne Road, Dublin	32–9	1984 Five Nations	Jim Aitken
23	17 March	France	Murrayfield Stadium, Edinburgh	21–12	1984 Five Nations	Jim Aitken
24	20 May	Romania	Stadionul Dinamo, Bucharest	22–28	Test match	Jim Aitken
25	8 December	Australia	Murrayfield Stadium, Edinburgh	12–37	Australia tour	Roy Laidlaw

==== Record by country ====
Opponent	Played	Won	Drew	Lost	Win ratio (%)	For	Against
Australia	4	2	0	2	50	57	92
England	4	2	1	1	50	66	50
France	4	2	0	2	50	61	54
Ireland	4	2	0	2	50	67	54
New Zealand	3	0	1	2	0	44	76
Romania	2	1	0	1	50	34	34
Wales	4	3	0	1	75	79	52
TOTAL	25	12	2	11	48	408	412

=== Scotland (1993–1995, 1998–1999) ===
The period 1995–98 saw Telfer promoted as director of rugby for the Scottish Rugby Union. Richie Dixon was the head coach of the Scotland National team during this time. Telfer stepped in as head coach of Scotland when Dixon quit in 1998.

==== International matches as head coach ====
Matches (1993–1995, 1998–99)
Matches	Date	Opposition	Venue	Score (Sco.–Opponent)	Competition	Captain
1993
1	20 November	New Zealand	Murrayfield Stadium, Edinburgh	15–51	New Zealand tour	Gavin Hastings
1994
2	15 January	Wales	Arms Park, Cardiff	6–29	Five Nations	Gavin Hastings
3	5 February	England	Murrayfield Stadium, Edinburgh	14–15	Five Nations	Gavin Hastings
4	5 March	Ireland	Lansdowne Road, Dublin	6–6	Five Nations	Gavin Hastings
5	19 March	France	Murrayfield Stadium, Edinburgh	12–20	Five Nations	Gavin Hastings
6	4 June	Argentina	Estadio Arquitecto Ricardo Etcheverri, Buenos Aires	15–16	Argentina tour	Andy Reed
7	11 June	Argentina	Estadio Arquitecto Ricardo Etcheverri, Buenos Aires	17–19	Argentina tour	Andy Reed
8	19 November	South Africa	Murrayfield Stadium, Edinburgh	10–34	South Africa tour	Gavin Hastings
1995
9	21 January	Canada	Murrayfield Stadium, Edinburgh	22–6	Test match	Gavin Hastings
10	4 February	Ireland	Murrayfield Stadium, Edinburgh	26–13	Five Nations	Gavin Hastings
11	18 February	France	Parc des Princes, Paris	23–21	Five Nations	Gavin Hastings
12	4 March	Wales	Murrayfield Stadium, Edinburgh	26–13	Five Nations	Gavin Hastings
13	18 March	England	Twickenham Stadium, London	12–24	Five Nations	Gavin Hastings
14	22 April	Romania	Murrayfield Stadium, Edinburgh	49–16	RWC Warm-up	Gavin Hastings
15	26 May	Ivory Coast	Olympia Park, Rustenburg, South Africa	89–0	World Cup	Gavin Hastings
16	30 May	Tonga	Loftus Versfeld Stadium, Pretoria, South Africa	41–5	World Cup	Gavin Hastings
17	3 June	France	Loftus Versfeld Stadium, Pretoria, South Africa	19–22	World Cup	Gavin Hastings
18	11 June	New Zealand	Loftus Versfeld Stadium, Pretoria, South Africa	30–48	World Cup	Gavin Hastings
1998
19	7 February	Ireland	Lansdowne Road, Dublin	17–16	Five Nations	Gary Armstrong
20	21 February	France	Murrayfield Stadium, Edinburgh	16–51	Five Nations	Gary Armstrong
21	7 March	Wales	Wembley Stadium, London	13–19	Five Nations	Gary Armstrong
22	22 March	England	Murrayfield Stadium, Edinburgh	20–34	Five Nations	Gary Armstrong
23	26 May	Fiji	National Stadium, Suva	26–51	Oceania tour	Rob Wainwright
24	13 June	Australia	Sydney Football Stadium, Sydney	3–45	Oceania tour	Rob Wainwright
25	20 June	Australia	Lang Park, Brisbane	11–33	Oceania tour	Rob Wainwright
26	21 November	South Africa	Murrayfield Stadium, Edinburgh	10–35	South Africa tour	Bryan Redpath
1999
27	6 February	Wales	Murrayfield Stadium, Edinburgh	33–20	Five Nations	Gary Armstrong
28	20 February	England	Twickenham Stadium, London	21–24	Five Nations	Gary Armstrong
29	6 March	Italy	Murrayfield Stadium, Edinburgh	30–12	Test match	Eric Peters
30	20 March	Ireland	Murrayfield Stadium, Edinburgh	30–13	Five Nations	Gary Armstrong
31	10 April	France	Stade de France, Saint-Denis	36–22	Five Nations	Gary Armstrong
32	21 August	Argentina	Murrayfield Stadium, Edinburgh	22–31	RWC Warm-up	Gary Armstrong
33	28 August	Romania	Hampden Park, Glasgow	60–19	RWC Warm-up	Gary Armstrong
34	3 October	South Africa	Murrayfield Stadium, Edinburgh	29–46	World Cup	Gary Armstrong
35	8 October	Uruguay	Murrayfield Stadium, Edinburgh	43–12	World Cup	Gary Armstrong
36	16 October	Spain	Murrayfield Stadium, Edinburgh	48–0	World Cup	Bryan Redpath
37	20 October	Samoa	Murrayfield Stadium, Edinburgh	35–20	World Cup	Gary Armstrong
38	24 October	New Zealand	Murrayfield Stadium, Edinburgh	18–30	World Cup	Gary Armstrong

==== Record by country ====
Opponent	Played	Won	Drew	Lost	Win ratio (%)	For	Against
Argentina	3	0	0	3	0	54	64
Australia	2	0	0	2	0	14	78
Canada	1	1	0	0	100	22	6
England	4	0	0	4	0	67	97
Fiji	1	0	0	1	0	26	51
France	5	2	0	3	40	106	136
Ireland	4	3	1	0	75	89	48
Italy	1	1	0	0	100	30	12
Ivory Coast	1	1	0	0	100	89	0
New Zealand	3	0	0	3	0	63	129
Romania	2	2	0	0	100	109	35
Samoa	1	1	0	0	100	35	20
South Africa	3	0	0	3	0	49	115
Spain	1	1	0	0	100	48	0
Tonga	1	1	0	0	100	41	5
Uruguay	1	1	0	0	100	43	12
Wales	4	2	0	2	50	78	81
TOTAL	38	16	1	21	42	963	889

== Honours ==
In 2021, World Rugby inducted Telfer into its World Rugby Hall of Fame, alongside Osea Kolinisau, Humphrey Kayange, Huriana Manuel, Cheryl McAfee and Will Carling.

=== As a player ===
- Scotland
  - Five Nations Championship
    - Winner: 1964
    - Runner-up: 1966, 1967
  - Calcutta Cup
    - Winner: 1964, 1965, 1966

=== As a coach ===
- Scotland
  - Five Nations Championship
    - Winner: 1984, 1999
    - Grand Slam: 1984
    - Runner-up: 1981, 1982, 1995
  - Triple Crown
    - Winner: 1984
  - Calcutta Cup
    - Winner: 1983, 1984
  - Centenary Quaich
    - Winner: 1994, 1995, 1998, 1999
- Scotland (as assistant coach)
  - Five/Six Nations Championship
    - Winner: 1990
    - Grand Slam: 1990
    - Runner-up: 1989, 1992, 1993
  - Triple Crown
    - Winner: 1990
  - Calcutta Cup
    - Winner: 1989, 1990, 2000
  - Centenary Quaich
    - Winner: 1989, 1990, 1991, 1992, 1993, 2001

== Sources ==
- Bath, Richard (ed.) The Complete Book of Rugby (Seven Oaks Ltd, 1997 ISBN 1-86200-013-1)
- Massie, Allan A Portrait of Scottish Rugby (Polygon, Edinburgh; ISBN 0-904919-84-6)
- Telfer, Jim Jim Telfer: Looking Back... For Once (Mainstream Publishing, 2005, ISBN 1-84596-062-9)

Preceded by Nairn McEwan	Scotland national rugby union team coach 1980–1984	Succeeded by Colin Telfer
Preceded by Noel Murphy	British Lions coach 1983	Succeeded by Ian McGeechan
Preceded by Ian McGeechan	Scotland national rugby union team coach 1993–1995	Succeeded by Richie Dixon
Preceded by Richie Dixon	Scotland national rugby union team coach 1998–1999	Succeeded by Ian McGeechan
Preceded by Ian McGeechan	British Lions coach 1997	Succeeded by (New Zealand) Graham Henry
