= Tony Copsey =

- Full name: Anthony Hugh Copsey
- Born: 25 January 1965 (age 61) Romford, Essex, England
- Height: 6 ft 6 in (198 cm)
- Weight: 246 lb (112 kg)

Rugby union career
- Position: Lock
International career
Years	Team	Apps	(Points)
1992–94	Wales	16	(0)

Anthony Hugh Copsey (born 25 January 1965) is an English-born former Wales rugby union international.

Copsey was born and raised in Romford, the youngest of five children. He attended St Edward's Comprehensive School, Romford, and continued tertiary studies in Wales at Cardiff Institute of Higher Education. While studying in Wales he got recruited by Llanelli RFC, debuting for the club in 1988. He played his rugby as a lock.

Qualifying for Wales through residency, Copsey made his debut against Ireland at Lansdowne Road in the 1992 Five Nations and was considered fortunate to not be sent off only 12 minutes into the match after punching Neil Francis. He earned 16 caps in total with Wales and was a member of the squad that won the 1994 Five Nations Championship.

Copsey played professional rugby with Saracens in the back end of his career. He was managing director of Harlequins from 2000 to 2007, CEO of Wasps for two years, then an interim CEO at London Scottish and London Welsh.

== See also ==
- List of Wales national rugby union players
