= Stuart Davies (rugby union) =

- Born: Stuart Davies; 2 September 1965 (age 61) Swansea, Wales
- Height: 6 ft 3 in (191 cm)
- Weight: 247 lb (112 kg)

Rugby union career
- Position: No. 8
Senior career
Years	Team	Apps	(Points)
1983-1998	Swansea RFC	243	(370)
International career
Years	Team	Apps	(Points)
1992-1998	Wales	17	(9)

Stuart Davies (born 2 September 1965) is a former Wales international rugby union player.

Davies was born in Swansea. A back row forward, he played his club rugby for Swansea RFC and attained 17 caps for Wales. He played 243 games for Swansea scoring 84 tries.

A neck injury sustained in the 1998 Five Nations Championship match against France forced Davies to end his career as a rugby player.

Following his retirement, Davies has appeared as a rugby commentator and summariser for BBC and also worked for Gwalia Housing Association. In February 2015, Davies was appointed as chief executive of the Newport Gwent Dragons regional rugby team.
