= Iain Morrison (rugby union) =

Scotland international rugby union player

- Born: Iain Robert Morrison; 14 December 1962 (age 63) Linlithgow, Scotland

Rugby union career
- Position: flanker
Senior career
Years	Team	Apps	(Points)
- London Scottish
Provincial / State sides
Years	Team	Apps	(Points)
- Anglo-Scots
International career
Years	Team	Apps	(Points)
1993–1995	Scotland	15	(15)

Iain Robert Morrison (born 14 December 1962) is a retired rugby union player who made 15 appearances for the Scotland national rugby union team. He played flanker.

== Early life ==
He was born in Linlithgow.

== Rugby Union career ==
=== Amateur career ===
He played club rugby for London Scottish.

=== Provincial career ===
He played for the Anglo-Scots District in the Scottish Inter-District Championship.

=== International career ===
Morrison made his international debut on 16 January 1993 against Ireland at Murrayfield.

His last appearance was against New Zealand in the 1995 Rugby World Cup.
