= Phil Davies (rugby union) =

Wales international rugby union footballer

- Born: Philip Thomas Davies; 19 October 1963 (age 63) Seven Sisters, Wales

Rugby union career
- Position(s): Lock; Back row
Senior career
Years	Team	Apps	(Points)
1982–95	Llanelli RFC	329	(341)
International career
Years	Team	Apps	(Points)
1985–1995	Wales	46	(21)
Coaching career
- Years: Team
- 1996–2006: Leeds Tykes
- 2006–08: Scarlets
- 2008–09: Cardiff (assistant)
- 2008–10: Wales U20
- 2010–12: Worcester Warriors (forwards)
- 2012–2014: Cardiff Blues
- 2014–15: Namibia (technical advisor)
- 2014–16: RGC 1404
- 2015–2019: Namibia
- 2017: Worcester Warriors (consultant)
- 2017–18: Llanelli
- 2018: Nuneaton (technical advisor)
- 2020–: Leeds Tykes

Philip Thomas Davies (born 19 October 1963) is a Welsh former rugby union footballer of the 1980s and 1990s. He is now an international coach, currently serving as director of rugby at Leeds Tykes, while running his own sports consultancy company.

== Playing career ==
Davies played his club rugby for Llanelli and enjoyed a distinguished 46-cap career for Wales between 1985 and 1995. It was during this period that Welsh packs became far less dominant than in the glory days of the 1970s and Davies, along with David Pickering and Bob Norster, was one of the few class forwards that his side could muster. Davies played 329 for Llanelli and scored 80 tries and 4 cons during his career.

The mustachioed Davies was a useful addition to the side mostly because of his offensive ability and the fact that he could play either as flanker, number eight or lock forward.

His career is also memorable for his involvement in the so-called "Battle of Cardiff" in 1987, an extremely violent clash between Wales and England that saw Davies punched by opposition lock Wade Dooley. Davies' first international appearance came in a 24–15 victory over England in Cardiff, a game that saw his brother-in-law, Jonathan Davies, also make his debut. England, who had not won in Cardiff since 1963, led the game 15–12, before fullback Chris Martin failed to take a high kick and Davies (Jonathan) scored a crucial try. Davies' next appearance came in a 40–3 victory against Fiji at the Arms Park, and he marked the occasion by scoring two of his side's seven tries.

The following year Davies played in seven tests in total, but was denied a possible Triple Crown when his side were beaten 21–18 by England in the first match of the campaign. Wales recovered to beat Scotland and Ireland before losing to France. Davies and his teammates then embarked on a short tour of the Southern Hemisphere as part of the side's preparation for the 1987 Rugby World Cup and included victories over Fiji, Tonga and Western Samoa. The games against Fiji and Samoa passed with relatively little incident, but the Tonga test was notable for its violence and both Davies and Adrian Hadley found themselves on the receiving end of opposition fists, not for the last time in Davies' case.

=== Honours ===
Wales

- Five Nations Championship
  - Winners: 1988 (Joint with France), 1994
  - Runner-up: 1986
- Triple Crown
  - Winners: 1988

Llanelli RFC

- Welsh Premier Division
  - Winners: 1993
- WRU Challenge Cup
  - Winners: 1985, 1988, 1991, 1992, 1993
  - Runner-up: 1989, 1994

== Coaching career ==
=== Leeds (1996–2006) ===
Davies was director of rugby at Leeds Tykes from 1996 to 2006 before resigning his post. When he first took charge in 1996 Leeds where in National Division Four, where in his debut season the club finished third, two places above the previous season. In 1998, they were promoted up to the Allied Dunbar Premiership Two finishing in sixth place, before finishing runner-up to Rotherham in 1999–2000. In 2001, Davies lead Leeds to the National Division One title, losing just two games all season. They were therefore promoted to the top elite tournament for the 2001–02 English Premiership season. Despite winning six games during the season, and performed well in the 2001–02 European Challenge Cup, they finished bottom of the table, but avoided relegation due to the inadequacies of Rotherham's ground. In the 2002–03 English Premiership season, Davies led Leeds to fifth with 12 victories, and the second round of the 2002–03 European Challenge Cup. In 2004 Leeds finished 11th, but did however secure seven victories to place them 34 points clear of relegated team Rotherham. In their debut season of the Heineken Cup, Leeds gained a single victory, a 29–20 win over Neath-Swansea Ospreys. Davies left his post at Leeds after they were relegated at the end of the 2005–06 English Premiership season. Davies said at the time: "I have no immediate plans to go elsewhere, rather I just feel it's time to take a break. I want to make it clear this mutual decision has nothing to do with the current situation at Leeds. It is after much soul searching and discussion with my family and Leeds Tykes that I have decided to resign my post."

Davies added: "The last 10 years has been an amazing journey with a fantastic group of people, helping to take the club from National League Three to Heineken Cup rugby and winning the Powergen Cup last season. I will have some time out with my family and reflect upon my career and future, after a decade at this wonderful club."

=== Return to Wales (2006) ===
In August 2006, he returned to his former playing club, the Scarlets after being appointed Director of Rugby. In his first season in charge at the region, he guided the side to a fourth-placed finish in the 2006–07 Celtic League, while also leading the side to the semi-finals of the 2006–07 Heineken Cup, losing to Leicester Tigers 33–17. In 2007–08, the Scarlets struggled under Davies, losing all six games in the 2007–08 Heineken Cup, and dropping to sixth place in the 2007–08 Celtic League. In April 2008, it was announced that the Scarlets had sacked Davies, and that the 10 May clash with Edinburgh would be his last. After leaving Llanelli, he served as a consultant head coach with Cardiff RFC from November 2008 until May 2009. Where after he became National Academy Manager for the Welsh Rugby Union, where he was responsible for developing an international pathway at the WRU. This role doubled up with his duties as Wales U20's head coach which he was appointed as in September 2008.

==== Wales U20 ====
His first job as head coach was the 2009 Six Nations Under 20s Championship, where Wales finished fifth, just ahead of Italy, who was the only team that tournament Wales won against; 34–14. During the 2009 IRB Junior World Championship, Wales finished sixth after losing to France 68–13 in the 5th Place Final. In the 2010 Six Nations Under 20s Championship, Wales finished third, with victories over Scotland, 20–12, France, 43–8 and Italy, 25–6. In the 2010 IRB Junior World Championship, Wales finished second in their Pool, behind New Zealand, and after losing to hosts Argentina on penalty shootout, Wales finished seventh with a win over Fiji, 39–15.

=== 2010–2015 ===
In 2010, Davies joined recently relegated side Worcester Warriors as forwards coach. He helped return Worcester back to the Premiership after they won the 2010–11 RFU Championship with just one loss all season. His work with the forwards saw Worcester stay afloat in the Premiership, finishing tenth in the 2011–12 English Premiership.

In May 2012 Davies joined Cardiff Blues as Director of Rugby. His first competitive match in charge was a 13–9 win over Connacht on 1 September 2012. Between 22 September and 25 November, the Blues suffered six consecutive losses, before winning just their fourth game of the season against Zebre 14–7. On 19 January 2013, Davies earned his first Heineken Cup win, after beating Sale Sharks 26–14 in the final pool round of the 2012–13 season. At the end of the 2012–13 Pro12, Davies had led Cardiff Blues to ninth on the table, their lowest ever position since the 2004–05 Celtic League. During the 2013–14 Pro12, the Blues finished seventh in the table with 8 victories, however 4 of those victories came after Davies resigned mid-season, leaving the club on 3 March 2014 after his side's recent run of poor results. However, during the 2013–14 Heineken Cup, Davies did lead the side to a 19–15 win over reigning champions Toulon on 19 October 2013, before winning back-to-back against Glasgow Warriors 29–20 and 9–7. A final pool round loss to Exeter Chiefs, 19–13, meant the Blues narrowly missed the quarter-finals of the 2013–14 European Challenge Cup.

After Namibia's 2014 end-of-year tour, Davies was appointed as interim head coach for North Wales region RGC 1404. Haven lead the side for the remainder of the 2014-15 Welsh Championship season, alongside his Namibian duties as technical adviser, Davies remained with the side for the full 2015-16 Welsh Championship season, missing the first part of the season due to his commitments with the Namibian national side. He helped see RGC promoted up to the Principality Premiership for their first ever time, before standing down as head coach at the end of that season to concentrate on his duties with Namibia.

=== Namibia (2014–2019) ===
After leaving Cardiff in March 2014, it was announced in November that year that Davies was appointed as technical adviser for the Namibian national side ahead of the 2015 Rugby World Cup. He began his role during Namibia's 2014 November internationals against Canada, the French Barbarians and Portugal. Despite strong performances, Namibia failed to win any of the games, losing 17–13, 35–14 and 29–20. He remained with the side during the 2015 World Rugby Nations Cup as an adviser, and after losing all three games then head coach Danie Vermeulen stood down on 25 June 2015.

==== Head coach of Namibia ====
On 26 June 2015, it was announced that Davies would become Namibia's new head coach following the resignation of Vermeulen. Davies moved from the technical advisory role he held from 2014, to the head coach role just 3 months before Namibia participated in the 2015 Rugby World Cup, and Davies first match in charge was on 11 July 2015 against Russia. Namibia claimed their first ever victory over Russia, beating them 39–19, before claiming a 45–5 win the following week to claim the series 2–0. Davies then lead Namibia into their final two matches in the 2015 Africa Cup. They knocked over Kenya, 46–13, and Zimbabwe, 80–6, to claim the Africa Cup title. Davies took the Namibian team to Durban, where Davies trained his side with the Springboks in a three-day training camp. Namibia proved to be much more competitive than in previous World Cups, where during the 2015 Rugby World Cup, Namibia picked up their first ever World Cup point, haven achieved a losing bonus points against Georgia after losing 17–16. In a pool that contained Argentina and New Zealand, Namibia only conceded 174 points, ahead of Uruguay who conceded 226. In Namibia's first game, they caused problems for the All Blacks who went on to win the game 58–18. Later, Namibia pushed Tonga to lose 35–21, though scored 3 tries in the match, the most scored by Namibia during a World Cup match. They finished their campaign with a 64–19 loss to Argentina on the final day of Pool matches.

In 2016, Davies led his side to second place in the 2016 World Rugby Nations Cup, only losing to Romania 20–8 in the opening round. Later in the year, he led Namibia to the 2016 Africa Cup title, winning all three games; Uganda (40–31), Kenya (56–21) and Zimbabwe (60–22). 2017 saw Namibia face top Tier 3 internationals from Europe in the 2017 World Rugby Nations Cup, facing Spain and Russia whilst also facing Italian B team, Emerging Italy. Namibia came away with a sole victory, beating the Italians 30–21 in the second round. In July 2017, Namibia continued their dominance in the African Cup, winning all five games of the 2017 Rugby Africa Gold Cup; Tunisia (53–7), Senegal (95–0), Zimbabwe (31–26), Uganda (48–24) and Kenya (45–7). Namibia's first ever test series against Uruguay proved difficult for Davies, losing the series 2–0, after losing the first test 52–36 and the second 39–34. 2017 proved an important year for Davies and Namibia, as it was final stage for the 2019 Rugby World Cup – Africa qualification. After winning all of their matches in the 2018 Africa Gold Cup, Namibia qualified for the 2019 Rugby World Cup, 8 points clear of Africa 2 nation, Kenya - who went to the Repechage tournament. During the 2018 November test window, Namibia came away with just one victory in three tests, after losing back-to-back matches against Russia and Spain, before narrowly defeating Portugal 29–23 in their final test of the year.

The start of the World Cup year saw Namibia win their first ever test match against Uruguay during the 2019 World Rugby Nations Cup. Despite this, Namibia went on to lose their other 2 games, finishing bottom of the table for the first time since 2015.

=== Return to Leeds Tykes ===
On 3 January 2020 Yorkshire Carnegie (the former name of Leeds Tykes) announced that Davies had returned to Headingley as Director of Rugby replacing Martyn Wood.The club were bottom of the Championship having lost their first 13 games of the season.

=== Honours ===
Namibia

- Africa Cup
  - Winners: 2015, 2016, 2017, 2018
- World Rugby Nations Cup
  - Runner-up: 2016 (joint with Emerging Italy)

Leeds Tykes

- National Division One
  - Winners: 2001
- Powergen Cup/Anglo-Welsh Cup titles: 1
  - Winners: 2005
- Yorkshire Cup
  - Winners: 1998, 2006

Worcester Warriors

- RFU Championship
  - Winners: 2011

== Consultancy company ==
In December 2016, Davies rejoined Worcester Warriors as a coaching consultant in a bid to see the club stay afloat in the top tier of English Rugby. With Davies' help, Worcester remained in the top flight competition with key victories over leading teams Harlequins 24–17 and Saracens 24–18.

In June 2017, Davies returned home to Wales and was announced as head coach for his former club side, Llanelli. He doubled up his duties with Llanelli and Namibia throughout the season, until he left his post at the end of Welsh season. As part of the personal consultancy company he runs, he became a technical adviser for Nuneaton R.F.C. in 2018, and remained with the side until late 2018 before turning his attention to Namibia in 2019.
