= Olivier Roumat =

France international rugby union player (born 1966)

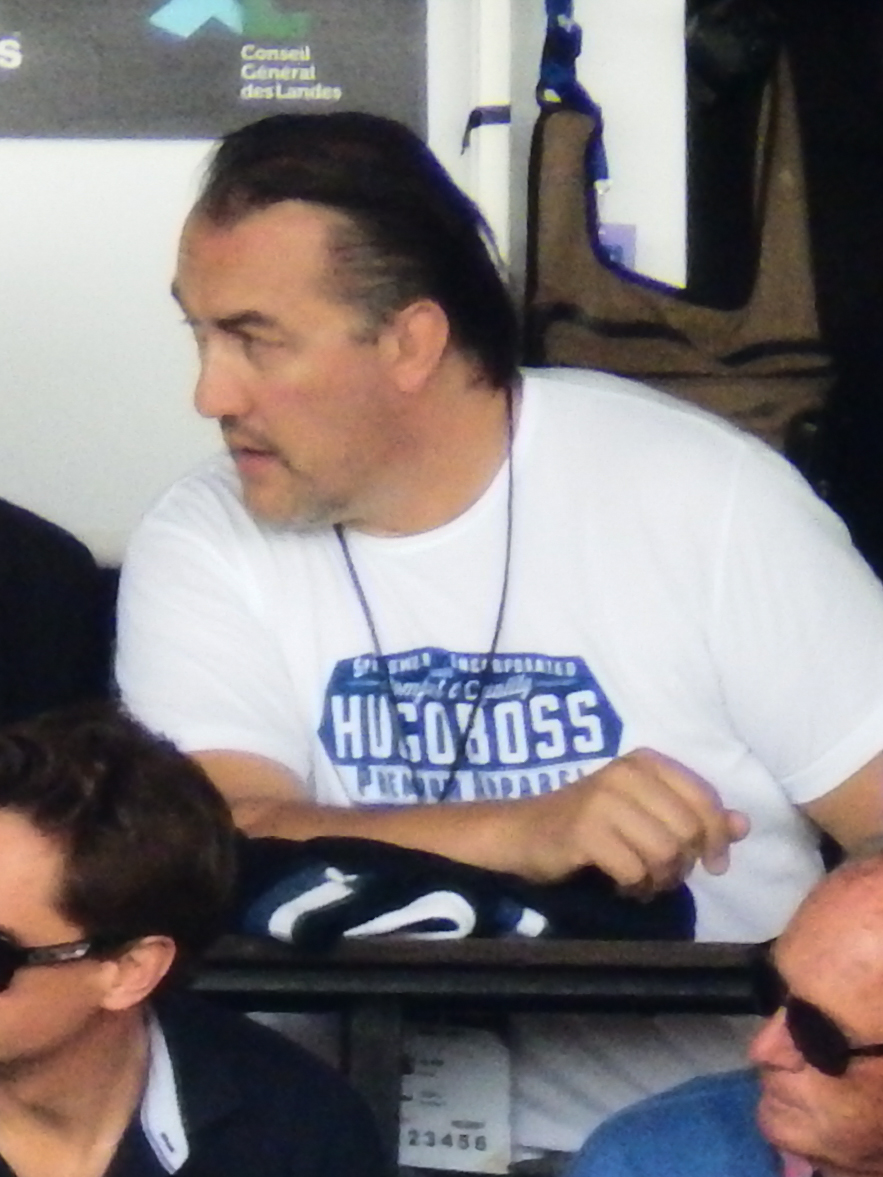
- Full name: Olivier Roumat
- Born: 16 June 1966 (age 60) Villeneuve-de-Marsan, France
- Height: 202 cm (6 ft 7 in)
- Weight: 18.4 st (117 kg; 258 lb)

Rugby union career
- Position(s): Lock, Flanker, Number-eight
Senior career
Years	Team	Apps	(Points)
1986–1995	Dax		
1996–1997	Dax		
1997–1998	Stade Français		
1998–2003	Biarritz		
Provincial / State sides
Years	Team	Apps	(Points)
1995	Sharks		
International career
Years	Team	Apps	(Points)
1989–96	France	61	(23)

Olivier Roumat (born 16 June 1966) is a former French rugby union footballer. He played as a number-eight, openside flanker and lock.

== Club career ==
Roumat first played at Villeneuve-de-Marsan, moving then to US Dax, where he premiered at 1985/86. He had a brief stint at Sharks, in South Africa, in 1995. He was a member of the winning side of the Currie Cup. He was back at US Dax for the 1996/97 season. Roumat then would play for Stade Français, for 1997/98, and for Biarritz Olympique, from 1998/99 to 2002/03. He won the title of French Champion with Stade Français, in 1997/98, and with Biarritz Olympique, in 2001/02.

== International career ==
Roumat won 61 caps for France, from 1989 to 1996, scoring 5 tries, 23 points in aggregate. He captained the national team on 8 occasions, from 1993 to 1994. He played for France at the 1991 Rugby World Cup, in four matches, scoring a try. France was knocked out of that World Cup by England (the eventual losing finalist) at the quarter-final stage. Roumat also represented France at the 1995 Rugby World Cup, appearing once again in five matches and scoring another try. This time France would finish the tournament in 3rd place, triumphing over England in the 3rd/4th place playoff after both teams were defeated at the semi-final stage. Roumat played in the Five Nations, in 1991, 1992, 1993, 1994, 1995 and 1996. He was a member of the Championship winning team in 1993.

== Honours ==
(France) Stade Français

- French Rugby Union Championship/Top 14: 1997–98
