= Philippe Benetton =

France international rugby union player

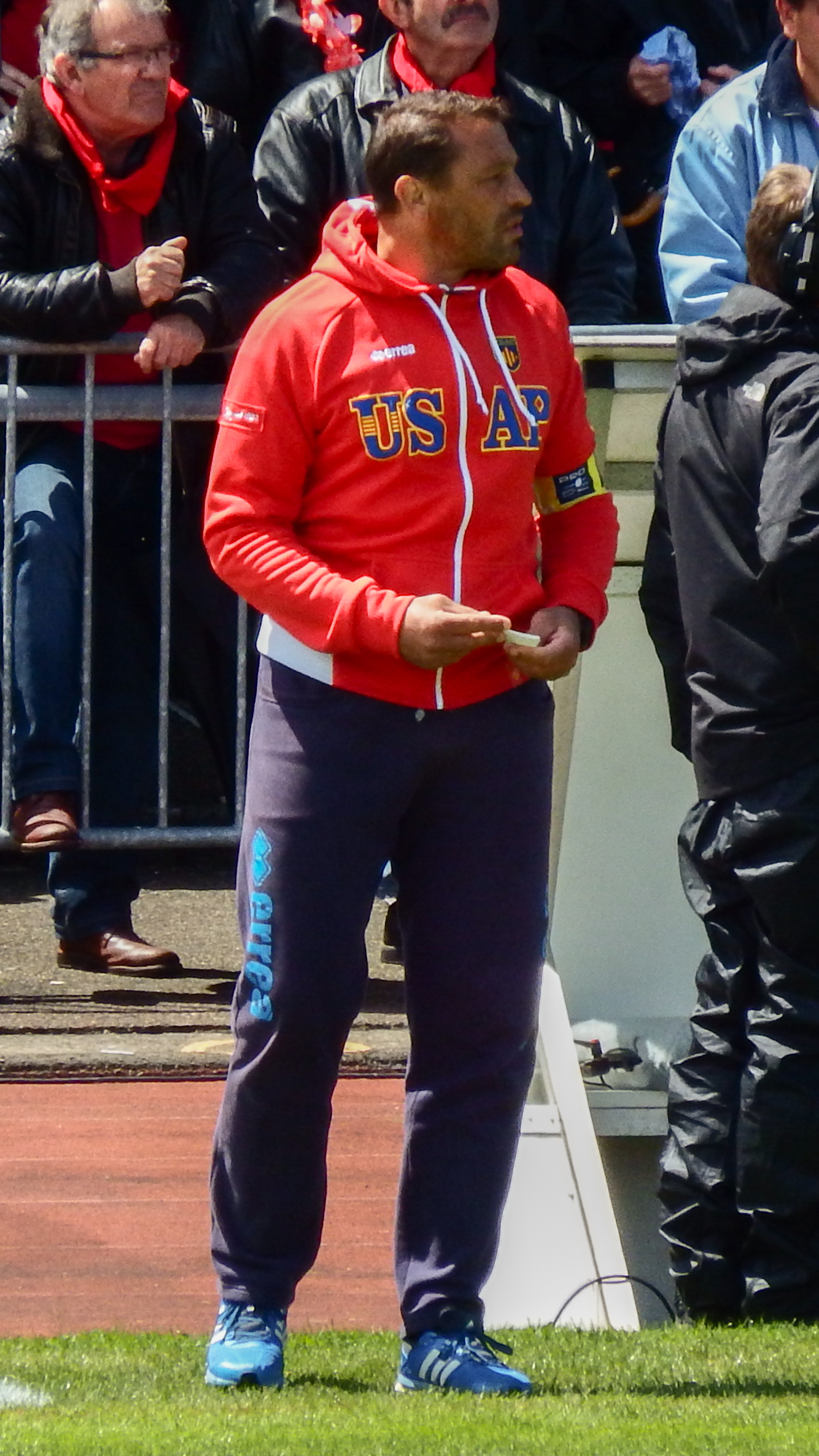
Philippe Benetton in 2016

Philippe Benetton (born Cahors, 18 May 1968) is a former French rugby union footballer and currently head coach of Tournon d'Agenais. He played as a flanker.

== Club career ==
Benetton had two teams during his career, Cahors and Agen, where he played until 2003. He won the French Top 14, in 1988, and the Challenge Yves du Manoir, in 1992, with Agen.

== International career ==
He had 59 caps for France, scoring 7 tries, 34 points in aggregate, from 1989 to 1999. He played three times at the Five Nations, in 1993, 1997 and 1998, winning it the last two times, with a Grand Slam. He also played at the 1995 Rugby World Cup finals, in a total of three games, but got injured in the win over Scotland, and missed the rest of the competition.

== Coach career ==
After ending his playing career, he became a coach. He first coached the French National Amateurs and Cahors (2005/06). He then joined Racing Métro 92 as forwards coach, serving in that role from 2006 through 2008. He was head coach at Limoges from 2009/10 to 2010/11.
