= Hugh Williams-Jones =

Wales international rugby union player

- Born: 10 January 1963 (age 63) Bryncethin, Wales
- Height: 5 ft 11 in (180 cm)
- Weight: 266 lb (121 kg)

Rugby union career
- Position: Prop
International career
Years	Team	Apps	(Points)
1989–95	Wales	17	(0)

Hugh Williams-Jones (born 10 January 1963) is a former Welsh rugby union international.

Williams-Jones, was born in Bryncethin, where his rugby career began, attended Ynysawdre Comprehensive School and was a Police Officer by profession.

Williams-Jones represented Wales Youth, Bridgend RFC and Pontypridd RFC before joining South Wales Police in 1984.

He represented South Wales Police RFC on 355 occasions between 1984 and 1993, then joined Llanelli where he made a further 128 appearances before retiring from rugby in 1998.

A prop, who was equally at home on either side of the scrum, Williams-Jones earned 17 caps for Wales and was a replacement on 31 further occasions when he did not take the field. He toured with Wales numerous times including the 1989 tour to Canada, the 1991 tour to Australia, the 1993 tour to Zimbabwe and Namibia and the 1994 tour to the South Seas, where he played in all three tests against Fiji, Tonga and Samoa.

His Wales career included a memorable win over England in the 1993 Five Nations, to end English hopes of a third successive grand slam. He was also a member of the Wales match day squad that won the 5 Nations in 1994.

Additionally in 1994 he became the first International temporary blood replacement, when he was substituted in against Italy during a World Cup qualifier in Cardiff.

Williams-Jones represented the Barbarians on numerous occasions, including the Easter Tour to Wales and the Mobbs Memorial match.

Since retiring from rugby in 1998 Williams-Jones has taken an active role as an Ambassador and fundraiser for the Velindre Cancer Centre, Cardiff, and has undertaken six overseas bike rides alongside fellow Internationals Jonathan Jiffy Davies and Shane Williams to raise funds for Velindre.

== See also ==
- List of Wales national rugby union players
