= Robert Jones (rugby union, born 1965) =

British Lions & Wales international rugby union footballer

Robert Jones MBE
- Born: Robert Nicholas Jones; 10 October 1965 (age 61) Glanamman, Wales
- Height: 5 ft 8 in (1.73 m)
- Weight: 162 lb (73 kg)
- School: Cwmtawe Comprehensive School

Rugby union career
- Position: Scrum-half
Amateur team(s)
Years	Team	Apps	(Points)
1983-2002	Swansea RFC	290	(384)
- Bristol
1998-1999	Cardiff RFC	25	(30)
1985-1994	Barbarian F.C.	11	(4)
International career
Years	Team	Apps	(Points)
1986-1995	Wales	54	(19)
1986-1993	British Lions	3	(0)

Robert Nicholas Jones (born 10 October 1965 at Glanamman, Wales) is a Welsh rugby union coach and former player. He was capped 54 times for Wales during his career, at that time a record. He and Gareth Edwards, Rob Howley, Dwayne Peel and Mike Phillips are the only scrum-halves to have achieved 50 caps or more for Wales.

Jones attracted widespread admiration during his playing career for his invention and the quality of his passing, which was often referred to by pundits as the best in the world. In addition his box-kicking from the base of the scrum or line-out was a potent weapon, used to best effect during Wales' 1989 victory over England at Cardiff Arms Park and the subsequent Lions tour to Australia. His attractive style of play earned him many invitations to play for the Barbarians in addition to his club and international selections.

He made his debut for Swansea RFC as a schoolboy and went on to play 290 games between 1983 and 2001/02, scoring 52 tries, and captaining them in 1989/90 and 1990/91.

Jones also made an appearance for the British and Irish Lions against a Rest of the World XV in 1986. He played 19 matches for the British Lions in total.

He formed a notable partnership for Wales with the outside-half Jonathan Davies before the latter's move to rugby league. Jones and Davies were important members of the Welsh team that won the Triple Crown in 1988. One of the most memorable tries of that championship came in the game against Scotland, when Jones supplied Davies with a long reverse pass, the latter then kicking ahead and beating his Scottish marker for pace to the goal line. Later in the same game Jones sent two high-quality passes to Davies under extreme pressure, enabling Davies to score a drop goal on each occasion and win Wales the match.

In 1989 Jones was part of the victorious British and Irish Lions tour to Australia, enjoying some memorable confrontations with the Wallabies' scrum half Nick Farr-Jones. In 1993 he toured New Zealand with the British Lions.

Jones also played for Western Province in South Africa during the 1994 Currie Cup tournament, forming a memorable partnership with South African fly-half Joel Stransky. He also played for English club Bristol, captaining them in 1997/98.

Jones was succeeded at scrum-half for Wales by Rupert Moon, a move which attracted some controversy. Few would disagree that Jones was the more technically accomplished scrum-half. However, he was often playing behind a weak Welsh pack at the time and Moon was brought in because of his more physical attributes rather than for his superior scrum-half technique.

Jones retired from international rugby after the 1995 World Cup in South Africa, and from all rugby in 2001. He was appointed MBE in the 1996 New Year Honours.

Since retiring, Jones can often be heard on BBC radio as a rugby pundit, and he was an assistant coach at the Llanelli Scarlets.

For the past ten years he has featured regularly on television as both a pundit and commentator and has featured in many documentaries on a number of TV channels including BBC, Sky, ITV, Channel 4, S4C and RTE. He is a regular on the BBC Wales rugby programme 'Scrum V', both as a live commentator and as a pundit. He was a recurring guest on the S4C Welsh language chat show 'Jonathan', hosted by his Welsh half-back partner Jonathan Davies.
