= Wayne Proctor =

Wales international rugby union footballer

- Born: Wayne Thomas Proctor; 12 June 1972 (age 54) Cardigan, Ceredigion, Wales
- Height: 6 ft 0 in (1.83 m)
- Weight: 182 lb (13 st 0 lb; 83 kg)
- School: Cardigan Secondary School
- Occupation: Quins youth coach

Rugby union career
- Position: Wing
Amateur team(s)
Years	Team	Apps	(Points)
	Llanelli RFC	302	(903)
International career
Years	Team	Apps	(Points)
1992-2001	Wales	39	(55)
Coaching career
- Years: Team
- 2014-2018: Namibia
- –: Quins Youth

Wayne Thomas Proctor (12 June 1972) is a former Wales international rugby union footballer, who was a winger/full-back for Wales, Llanelli RFC and subsequently the Llanelli Scarlets.

A former Welsh schools international athlete, Proctor represented Wales at the 110m hurdles whilst a student at Cardigan Secondary School.

Proctor is still the current record holder for the most tries in the Welsh league and record try scorer for Llanelli RFC. He is the third highest points scorer for the Scarlets, with 903. Gareth Bowen is the second highest points scorer, with 1,055, and Stephen Jones is leading, with 2,716. He is also in fifth place on the appearances list for the Scarlets, with 304. In total he scored 182 tries for Llanelli.

Having studied sports science at Pembrokeshire College, Proctor for many years held the position of Fitness Coach to the Llanelli Scarlets. Proctor was formerly Fitness coach for the Wales under 21s squad and is currently the fitness coach for the Wales Sevens Squad.
