= Rupert Moon =

Wales international rugby union player

- Born: Rupert Henry St. John Barker Moon; 1 February 1968 (age 58) Birmingham, England
- Height: 6 ft 0 in (1.83 m)
- University: Polytechnic of Wales

Rugby union career
- Position: Scrum-half
Senior career
Years	Team	Apps	(Points)
1986–1989	Abertillery		
1989–1990	Neath		
1990–2002	Llanelli	272	(392)
International career
Years	Team	Apps	(Points)
1993–2001	Wales	24	(15)

Rupert Henry St. John Barker Moon (born 1 February 1968) is a former Wales international rugby union player. He played club rugby for Welsh clubs Abertillery and Neath but is most associated with Llanelli, who he captained during their unprecedented triple success season of 1992 when they won the League and Cup, and beat then Rugby World Cup Champions Australia. He played international rugby for Wales at scrum half, winning 24 caps.

== Family life ==
Moon was born in Birmingham, England to Henry and Audrey Moon. His elder brother, Richard Moon, played rugby for Walsall, Abertillery, Harlequins, England A and the Barbarians at scrum half. His elder sister, Estelle Moon, played rugby at Scrum Half for Wasps Ladies. Rupert is married, with two children.

== Education, post-rugby career and charity work ==
Rupert Moon studied at Sandwell College and later the University of Glamorgan where he achieved a degree in Public Administration.

Alongside playing rugby, Moon ventured into radio-broadcasting work, hosting his own show 'Over the Moon' on Dragon FM. Other media work followed and following his rugby career he became a radio and television presenter on HTV and BBC Wales, presenting amongst other programmes - X-Ray, Tellyphonin', Moon and the Stars, Homeland, and Radio Wales' Rush Hour.

Moon became Head of Group Commercial & Business Development in 2003 for the Welsh Rugby Union and the Millennium Stadium, when the Group recorded record turnover and record profits. He was one of three people who staged the Tsunami Relief Concert at the Millennium Stadium in January 2005.

He joined Protectagroup, an insurance broker, in 2007, as Group Marketing Director. He returned in June 2009 to the Scarlets as Commercial Director.

From 2012 to 2016 he was General Manager of the North Wales Rugby Development Region, setting up a new regional rugby team in North Wales, where he oversaw the staffing, operational and strategic management of joint WRU and Conwy Council initiatives.

Moon currently works as Strategy Director for the RNF Property Group.

He is Patron of charities Tenovus Cancer Care and the Welsh Rugby Charitable Trust and is active in fundraising activities for a number of charities.

== Rugby career ==
Moon played rugby for Abertillery RFC, Neath RFC, and, most famously, from 1990, Llanelli RFC, his 'spiritual home'. He played at scrum half. Moon went on to captain Llanelli, a team he played 272 games for over 12 years, scoring 77 tries.

During the 1992 season, Moon captained Llanelli during their unprecedented triple success season, where they won the League and Cup, and beat then Rugby World Cup Champions Australia. Moon earned 24 caps for the Wales national rugby team at Scrum Half, making his debut in 1993 in the then Five Nations Championship. Moon retired from international rugby in 2001.
