= Eric Elwood =

Ireland international rugby union player

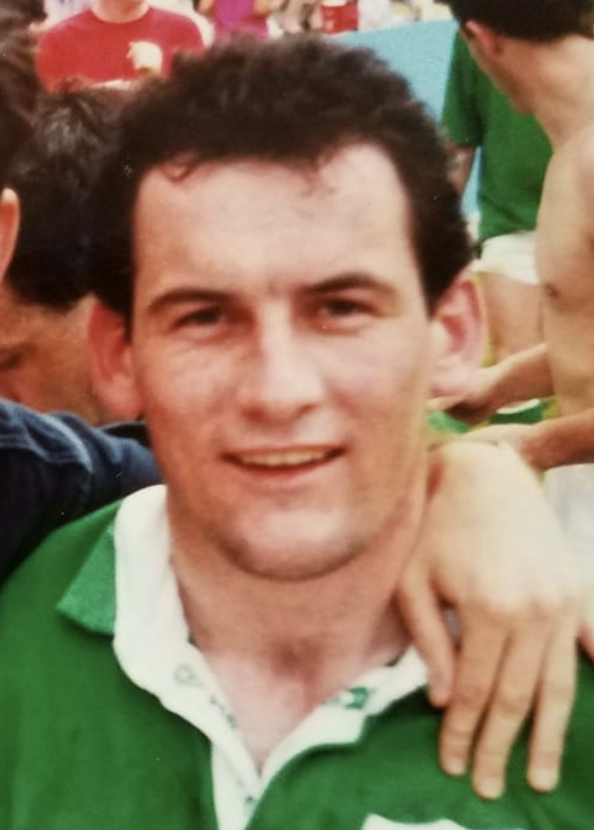
- Elwood at the HK Sevens in 1993
- Born: Eric Paul Elwood; 26 February 1969 (age 57) Galway, Ireland
- Height: 5 ft 11 in (180 cm)
- Weight: 203 lb (92 kg)

Rugby union career
- Position: Fly-half
Amateur team(s)
Years	Team	Apps	(Points)
- Galwegians
–	Lansdowne		
–	Galwegians		
Senior career
Years	Team	Apps	(Points)
1989–2005	Connacht	168	(1,152)
- Correct as of 16 April 2005
International career
Years	Team	Apps	(Points)
1993–1999	Ireland	35	(296)
1993	Barbarians	1	(12)
- Correct as of 16 October 1999
Coaching career
- Years: Team
- 2005–2010: Connacht (Assistant)
- 2006–2007: Ireland U20
- 2010–2013: Connacht
- 2016–2017: Connacht (Kicking)
- 2017–: Connacht Academy
- Correct as of 25 March 2019

Eric Elwood is a former Irish rugby union player from Galway. He played as a fly-half. He played for Ireland internationally, and provincially for Connacht. He was on the Coláiste Iognáid team that won the Connacht Schools Rugby Senior Cup in 1985. He split his club career between hometown club Galwegians and Lansdowne in Dublin, starting and finishing his career in Galway, with a stint playing with Lansdowne in the 1990s. Elwood earned 35 caps for Ireland, scoring 296 points for the side. He played 168 games for Connacht scoring 1,152 points. He was the first Connacht player to make 100 appearances for the side, while his points tally remained a record until being surpassed by Jack Carty in 2023. Elwood also made a single appearance for international invitational side the Barbarians before being capped by Ireland.

After retiring from playing, Elwood went into coaching. He served as assistant coach for Connacht and then as coach of the Ireland under-20 side, where he won a Grand Slam in 2007. In 2010, he became head coach of Connacht and led the team to the Heineken Cup for the first time. He held this position until his decision to resign at the end of the 2012–13 season. He has since taken a variety of roles within the provincial set up, taking the role of Domestic Rugby Manager in 2015. Elwood returned to first team coaching in 2016 when he became kicking coach. In 2017, he moved roles again when he was appointed head of the Connacht Academy.

== Playing career ==
Elwood made his debut for Connacht against Scottish North & Midland, at inside centre, on 18 September 1989. He scored the first of his 8 tries for Connacht a month later, 21 October 1989, against Munster in the Sportsground when tries were still only worth 4 points.

He was the first Connacht player to score over 1,000 points for the province. By the time he made his final appearance, against Sale on the 24th of April 2005, Elwood had scored 8 tries, 141 conversions, 7 drop goals and 268 penalties, a total of 1,152 points.

His number of appearances for Connacht was also the record until November 2009, when Michael Swift overtook him.

When Elwood was first capped for Ireland, he was playing for Lansdowne, but he later returned to Galwegians, the club of his youth.

Elwood played 35 times for Ireland and scored a total of 296 points. This total places him at number four in the all-time points scorers for Ireland.

He also participated in two Rugby World Cups, in the 1995 tournament which took place in South Africa, and 1999's tournament, in France. He made his last appearance for Ireland coming on as a substitute in their play-off loss to Argentina at the 1999 World Cup in Lens. Eric also participated in the inaugural 1993 Rugby World Cup Sevens held in Murrayfield, where the Ireland Squad reached the semi-final, losing out to eventail runners up Australia.

In 1993, Elwood was called up for the Barbarians invitational side. He played against New Zealand at Cardiff Arms Park. The Barbarians lost the game 12–25, with Elwood scoring all of the team's points, converting four penalties.

Elwood also played Gaelic Football for Galway appearing in the 1990 Connacht Football Final defeat to Roscommon.

== Coaching career ==
Following retirement from playing for Connacht, Elwood worked as an assistant coach for the province. Elwood was coach to the Ireland Under-20 for a time in 2006 and 2007. He coached the team to a grand slam in the 2007 Six Nations Under 20s Championship.

Elwood took over from Michael Bradley as director of coaching at Connacht following the end of the 2009–10 season. Elwood was in charge of Connacht for their Heineken Cup appearance in the 2011–12 competition, thanks to Leinster winning the 2011 Heineken Cup Final. Connacht lost their first five matches in the pool stages, claiming losing bonuses in both of their ties with Gloucester. In the final game of their pool, however, they managed an upset, beating Harlequins 9–8 in the Galway Sportsgrounds, which prevented the Premiership club from topping the group, and knocked them down into the Amlin Cup.

He also coached the team in the 2012–13 Heineken Cup, with the team winning three of their pool matches. The victories came in the home and away ties with newly formed Italian professional team Zebre, along with a victory at home to 2009–10 finalists and 2011–12 Challenge Cup winners Biarritz.

In October 2012, Elwood announced he would be departing as Connacht coach at the end of the 2012–13 season, and he was succeeded as coach by former Samoa international and Auckland Blues head coach, Pat Lam.
