= Rob Andrew =

British Lions & England international rugby union footballer & cricketer

Rob Andrew MBE
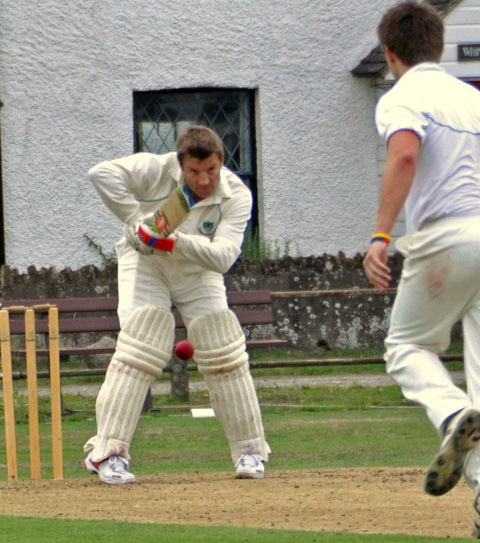
- Andrew playing cricket
- Born: Christopher Robert Andrew; 18 February 1963 (age 63); Richmond, North Yorkshire, England
- Education: St John's College, Cambridge
- Occupations: ECB Managing Director, Professional Game
- Spouse: Sara Andrew
- Children: Emily, Beth, Iola
- Height: 5 ft 9 in (1.75 m)

Rugby union career
- Position: fly-half
Amateur team(s)
Years	Team	Apps	(Points)
1982–1985	Cambridge University		
Senior career
Years	Team	Apps	(Points)
1985–1986	Nottingham		
1987–1991	Wasps		
1991-1992	Toulouse		
1992–1995	Wasps		
1995–1999	Newcastle Falcons		
International career
Years	Team	Apps	(Points)
1985–1997	England	71	(396)
1989, 1993	British and Irish Lions	5	(11)
- Cricket career

Cricket information
- Batting: Left-handed
- Bowling: Right-arm off-break
- Role: Batsman

Domestic team information
- Years: Team
- 1984–1985: Cambridge University
- FC debut: 18 April 1984 Cambridge University v Leicestershire
- Last FC: 5 July 1985 Cambridge University v Oxford University
- LA debut: 5 May 1984 Combined Universities v Hampshire
- Last LA: 18 May 1985 Combined Universities v Essex

Career statistics
Competition	FC	List A
Matches	17	5
Runs scored	658	150
Batting average	21.22	37.50
100s/50s	1/3	0/1
Top score	101*	82*
Balls bowled	1,433	156
Wickets	12	1
Bowling average	70.58	124.00
5 wickets in innings	0	0
10 wickets in match	0	0
Best bowling	3/77	1/15
Catches/stumpings	6/–	0/–
- Source: CricketArchive, 8 December 2008

Christopher Robert Andrew MBE (born 18 February 1963) is a former English rugby union player who as a fly-half played 71 Tests for England between 1985 and 1997. Since his retirement from playing he has held administration roles in both rugby and cricket. He was formerly the Director of Rugby of Newcastle Falcons and Professional Rugby Director at the RFU. He was Chief Executive of Sussex County Cricket Club before joining the England and Wales Cricket Board in 2024 as Managing Director of the professional game.

As a player, Andrew was assured in his kicking and defensive skills off both feet. Andrew also had a brief career in first-class cricket whilst at University and played for Yorkshire County Cricket Club's Second XI.

Andrew was born in Richmond, North Yorkshire, England on 18 February 1963.

== Rugby career ==
=== Domestic ===
Andrew attended Barnard Castle School, where he was contemporary with future teammate Rory Underwood and was captain of the school 1st XV in 1981. Whilst in the northeast, both Underwood and Andrew played their rugby at Middlesbrough RUFC. Andrew then attended St John's College, Cambridge, and played for Cambridge University in the Varsity Match.

He joined Nottingham for one season in 1985/86 and then joined Wasps FC where he was first choice fly-half throughout most of the eight seasons he spent with the north London club. At Wasps FC he won the English League in 1990, eventually leaving to join Newcastle Gosforth in 1995 as both a player and as director of rugby.

The club had just been bought out by Sir John Hall in the lead-up to the game turning professional; they became the Falcons of today. During his time in charge of Newcastle Falcons he is credited with discovering Jonny Wilkinson. In 1991 he joined the famous Stade Toulousain (France) for one season. He was an ever-present when Newcastle Falcons won the 1997-98 Premiership. His playing career was ended in 1999 after an injury in training.

=== International ===
Andrew was fly-half for England during the Will Carling era, making a winning debut in January 1985 against Romania at Twickenham. For the next 10 years he was England's regular fly-half earning 70 caps, including 2 as captain. He was briefly dropped in 1993 as England tried out Bath RFC's Stuart Barnes for the fly-half's position, but regained it after two matches. After England finished 4th in the 1995 Rugby World Cup, he saw out his contract at Wasps and moved to the Newcastle Falcons. He made his final appearance for England after an absence of almost two years when he was called off the bench as a try scoring replacement against Wales in March 1997. In total, he scored 396 international points, won the Grand Slam with England 3 times and held the English record for the most points scored in an international - 30, scored against Canada in 1994.

Critics of the England side blamed him for kicking the ball too much rather than passing - perhaps unfairly since England three times broke the Five Nations records for tries scored, and points scored, with Andrew as fly-half (in 1990 despite not even winning the tournament, and again in 1992 and 1995): however it was undeniable that England's game plan was based very much more around their forwards than their backs, with kicking for territory and competing to win line-outs and rucks in opposition territory being a major part of the tactic. England did, however, enjoy a great deal of success with him as their Number 10.

Inconsistent early in his career as a place-kicker for penalties and conversions, and often ceding that duty to fullbacks Webb and Hodgkinson (only to have to take some kicks anyway, when Webb also proved inconsistent early in his own career), Andrew improved that aspect of his game greatly, until by the end of his career he was among the best in the world at it, as well as being a reliable source of dropped-goals.

He played in 3 Rugby World Cup competitions; 1987 (making 2 appearances), 1991 and 1995. Curiously, just as Wilkinson had beaten Australia in the 2003 Rugby World Cup Final with a drop goal, the last time Australia lost in the same competition was in 1995. In that year, it was Andrew who nailed a drop goal on the stroke of full-time to beat the Wallabies 25–22. Four years before, it was another late drop-goal by Andrew, in the semi-final against Scotland, that took England to the final against Australia.

In 1989 he had the honour of captaining the British and Irish Lions against France in a rare "home" match for the Lions. The game formed part of the celebrations of the bi-centennial of the French Revolution. In the final match, against ANZAC, of the Lions' victorious '89 tour to Australia, Andrew came on at inside center as a substitute for the injured Brendan Mullen. Andrew also toured to New Zealand with the Lions in 1993, starting at flyhalf over his England rival Barnes. The Lions lost the test series to New Zealand 2–1.

=== Post playing ===
Andrew remained as director of rugby at Newcastle Falcons after the injury that ended his playing career until on 18 August 2006 he was appointed by the RFU to undertake the post of Director of Elite Rugby to oversee all aspects of representative rugby in England, from the regional academies to the full senior side.

On 6 January 2011, Andrew's role as director of elite rugby at the Rugby Football Union was scrapped in an overhaul of the organisation's structure. It was reported that Andrew was invited to apply for one of the new roles created by this process, that of operations director. At a press conference on 16 November 2011 Andrew's position was described as Director of Elite Rugby and he reportedly took several attempts to (inconclusively) describe his responsibilities. He resigned as the RFU's director of professional rugby in February 2016.

On 10 November 2017, Andrew was inducted into the World Rugby Hall of Fame at a ceremony held in the Hall's facility in Rugby.

== Cricket career ==
Andrew was also a talented cricketer, gaining a Cambridge blue for that sport as well, and he made 17 first-class cricket appearances for the university cricket team in 1984 and 1985, as well as playing five times for Combined Universities in one-day cricket. A left-handed batsman and right arm off-break bowler, he made one first-class century, scoring 101 not out against Nottinghamshire in July 1984. Andrew also made a few appearances for the Yorkshire Second XI, and on one occasion dismissed future England captain Mike Atherton (then aged 17) for a duck.

In November 2016, Andrew was appointed chief executive of Sussex County Cricket Club. After seven years in the role he joined the England and Wales Cricket Board as Managing Director of the professional game.

== Off the field ==
Andrew is an Honorary President of the rugby charity Wooden Spoon, which raises funds for disadvantaged children and young people in the UK and Ireland.

== See also ==
- List of top English points scorers and try scorers
- List of cricket and rugby union players

Sporting positions
Preceded by Will Carling	English National Rugby Union Captain; May 1989	Succeeded by Will Carling
Preceded by Will Carling	English National Rugby Union Captain; May 1995	Succeeded by Will Carling
