= Mike Rayer =

Wales international rugby union player & coach

- Born: Mike Rayer; 21 July 1965 (age 61) Wales
- Height: 5 ft 10 in (1.78 m)

Rugby union career
- Position: Fullback
Senior career
Years	Team	Apps	(Points)
1984-2001	Cardiff RFC	367	(1422)
- Bedford Blues
International career
Years	Team	Apps	(Points)
1991–1994	Wales	21	(23)
Coaching career
- Years: Team
- 2005 -: Bedford Blues

Michael Anthony Rayer (born 21 July 1965) is a former Wales international rugby union player. A full-back, he played his club rugby for Cardiff RFC and Bedford. He is currently coach to Bedford Blues. A talented and popular player, he played during a period where there was little success in Welsh rugby. He is commonly remembered for scoring two tries as a replacement wing against Scotland in 1994 (replacing fellow Cardiff player Nigel Walker). As tactical substitutions were not allowed at that time scores from replacements were still relatively rare.
