= Emyr Lewis (rugby union) =

Wales international rugby union player

- Born: Emyr Wyn Lewis; 29 August 1968 (age 58) Carmarthen, Wales, UK

Rugby union career
- Position: Number 8
Amateur team(s)
Years	Team	Apps	(Points)
- Carmarthen Athletic RFC
–	Llanelli RFC	164	(213)
–	Cardiff RFC	174	(125)
International career
Years	Team	Apps	(Points)
1991–1996	Wales	41	(15)

Emyr Wyn Lewis (born 29 August 1968) is a Welsh former rugby union player who played as a flanker. He won 41 caps for Wales between 1991 and 1996.

Born in Carmarthen, he played his club rugby for Carmarthen Athletic and Llanelli, before finishing his career at Cardiff.
