= Ieuan Evans =

Wales and British Lions international rugby union player

Ieuan Evans MBE
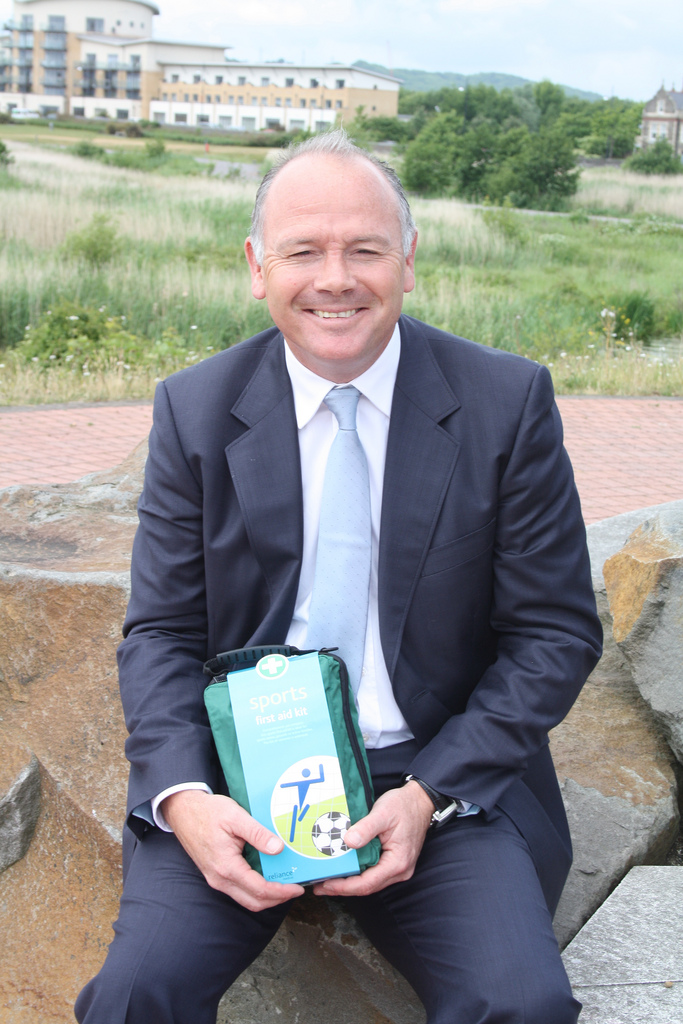
- Ieuan Evans
- Born: Ieuan Cennydd Evans; 21 March 1964 (age 62) Pontarddulais, Wales
- Height: 5 ft 10 in (1.78 m)
- Weight: 13 st 5 lb (187 lb; 85 kg)
- School: Queen Elizabeth Grammar
- University: Salford University

Rugby union career
- Position: Wing
Amateur team(s)
Years	Team	Apps	(Points)
- Carmarthen Quins RFC
1984-1997	Llanelli RFC	232	(874)
–	Bath		
–	Barbarian F.C.		
International career
Years	Team	Apps	(Points)
1987–1998	Wales	72	(157)
1989–1997	British and Irish Lions	7	(4)

Ieuan Cennydd Evans MBE (born 21 March 1964) is a Welsh former rugby union player. He played as a wing for Llanelli, Bath, Wales and the British and Irish Lions. He is the fourth highest try scorer for Wales and joint 32nd in the world on the all-time test try scoring list. Evans held the record for the most Wales caps as captain with 28, a record overtaken by Ryan Jones in 2012.

== Career ==
=== Club level ===
Evans was born in Pontarddulais, Wales, and started playing rugby at the age of 10 as a pupil at Queen Elizabeth Grammar School, Carmarthen before captaining the team at the newly renamed Queen Elizabeth Maridunum School. When he was 17, Evans started playing for Carmarthen Quins RFC youth side before joining Llanelli two years later, initially as a student at Salford University. He went on to win five of seven cup finals for the club playing 232 games and scoring 194 tries. In 1997 he left Llanelli for Bath where he was part of the team which won the Heineken Cup in 1998.

=== International level ===
While at Llanelli, Evans gained a call-up to the Welsh National Side and made his first international appearance as a right-wing for Wales against France in Paris in 1987. He went on to win 72 caps for Wales, 28 of which as a captain, and scored 33 tries – at that time a record for Wales – and was dubbed "Merlin" by TV commentator Bill McLaren. In March 1994, he captained Wales when the team won the Five Nations Championship.

Evans went on three tours with the British and Irish Lions, to Australia in 1989, New Zealand in 1993 and South Africa in 1997. Among his most memorable moments were scoring the decisive series-winning try in the 3rd Lions Test against Australia in 1989 and his four tries during the 1993 tour to New Zealand, which made him the Lions' top try scorer. He made his final international appearance against Italy in 1998.

== Personal life ==
Evans was awarded the MBE for services to rugby in 1996, and announced his retirement from the game in 1998 to run his own PR marketing company.

In 2007 he was inducted into the International Rugby Hall of Fame. In 2014 he was introduced to the IRB Hall of Fame.

Ieuan Evans has three children; Lili (born 1997), Cai (born 1999) and Tirion (born 2001). Cai Evans is a Wales international rugby union player who pays as a fly-half.

After retiring from professional rugby, Evans has been a regular broadcaster, presenter and rugby pundit. He has worked for the BBC, ITV and currently for Sky Sports for over a decade. He has held a non-executive and ambassadorial positions for a number of companies and has been a board member of the Welsh Tourist Board, VisitBritain, 2010 Ryder Cup and Nominet Wales Advisory Group.

In September 2020 Evans was elected for a three-year term on the Welsh Rugby Union's National Council. He was appointed chairman in November 2022 and resigned from the board in July 2023.

Evans is involved in a number of charities. Since 2008 he has raised funds and organised sporting events for Help for Heroes. He has been actively involved in supporting the Velindre Cancer Centre. In 2010, he took part in the 'Captains Climb' which saw 15 past captains of the Welsh Rugby team climb Mount Kilimanjaro, raising thousands of pounds toward the work of the charity.
