= Alan Davies (rugby union coach) =

Welsh rugby union coach

- Born: Alan Davies; 22 August 1944 (age 82) Ynysybwl, Wales
- School: Carlton-Le-Willows
- University: Loughborough
- Notable relative: Betty

Rugby union career
Coaching career
- Years: Team
- 1991–1995: Wales

Alan Davies (born 22 August 1944 in Ynysybwl) is a rugby union coach. He was coach of the Wales national rugby union team from 1991 to 1995, winning 18 of their 35 matches. Davies also coached Nottingham RFC, Notts, Lincs and Derbys, Midlands Division, England B and England, Bristol RFC.
