= Neil Jenkins =

Wales and British Lions international rugby union player and coach

Neil Jenkins MBE
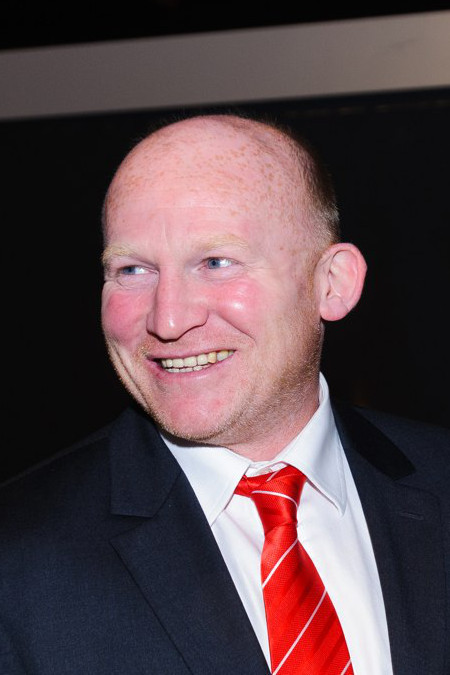
- Jenkins on 19 March 2012
- Born: Neil Roger Jenkins; 8 July 1971 (age 55) Church Village, Wales
- Height: 1.78 m (5 ft 10 in)
- Weight: 86 kg (13.5 st; 190 lb)
- School: Bryn Celynnog Comprehensive School

Rugby union career
- Position(s): Fly-half, Full back
Senior career
Years	Team	Apps	(Points)
1990–99, 2002–03	Pontypridd	237	(3,185)
1999–02	Cardiff	45	(655)
2003–04	Celtic Warriors	26	(299)
International career
Years	Team	Apps	(Points)
1991–1992	Wales U21	1	(10)
1991–2002	Wales	87	(1049)
1997, 2001	British & Irish Lions	4	(41)
Coaching career
- Years: Team
- 2004–: Wales
- 2009, 2013,: British & Irish Lions

Neil Jenkins, MBE (born 8 July 1971) is a Welsh former rugby union player and current coach. He played fly-half, centre, or full back for Pontypridd, Cardiff, Celtic Warriors, Wales and the British & Irish Lions. Jenkins is Wales' highest ever points-scorer and is the fifth highest on the List of leading rugby union test point scorers. He was the first player to score 1,000 points in international matches.

In 2004, Jenkins joined the coaching staff of the Wales national rugby union team and was the kicking skills coach.

== Early life ==
Jenkins was born in Church Village near Pontypridd, Wales to a scrap dealer and his wife. He attended Llanilltud Faerdref primary school and then Bryn Celynnog Comprehensive School in Beddau.

== Career ==
Jenkins joined Pontypridd in 1990, making his First XV debut on 14 April.

He made his Wales debut aged 19 on 19 January 1991 against England during the Five Nations Championship in Cardiff, a game that Wales lost 25–6, but Jenkins scored his first three points thanks to a penalty. After the Five Nations campaign, Jenkins missed out on a place in the Welsh World Cup squad – the number ten position having been taken up by Mark Ring.

Jenkins' main strength was his kicking, although he was deceptively quick in his early career. Despite this, he still received tremendous criticism and many felt that he was not worthy enough to inherit the Welsh number 10 shirt of Barry John, Phil Bennett and Cliff Morgan, leading Jenkins to tailor his game to the demands of the modern game. He developed his tackling, passing and running skills, especially under the coaching of Graham Henry, and became an excellent distributor of the ball, notably his excellent flat passes. He was also a strong runner. In November 1993, he managed an international record eight successful penalty kicks at goal in Wales's 24–26 defeat to Canada. At the age of just 23, he passed Paul Thorburn to become Wales's record Test point scorer in a 29–19 win against Italy, in which he also equalled the record of 24 points in a game he had set against Canada.

Jenkins went on the 1997 British Lions tour to South Africa, playing full back in all three tests. His accurate goalkicking enabled the Lions to beat the Springboks during the first two tests, and thus secure the series 2–1. Across all three Tests he managed 41 points, beating Gavin Hastings's previous record of 38.

In the final match of the 1999 Five Nations Championship, Jenkins kicked a conversion in the dying moments of the game to beat England 32–31 at Wembley to deny their English counterparts the title, as Scotland won on points difference, with Wales finishing third. Later that year, he also equalled the international record by converting nine penalties in a World Cup warm-up game against France.

In October 2000, Jenkins was made an MBE for services to sport. He picked up the MBE from Buckingham Palace before being flown back to the Welsh capital by helicopter for a rugby match in which he scored all 24 points for Cardiff in their 24–14 win over Saracens.

In 2001, Jenkins became the first ever rugby player to break the 1,000 international points mark, with a 28-point haul featuring a Full House of a try, conversion, drop-goal, and penalty against France in Paris.

Jenkins went on the 2001 British & Irish Lions tour to Australia, but was carrying an injury, allowing English fly-half Jonny Wilkinson to become the preferred fly-half and goalkicker. However, Jenkins did gain his fourth Lions cap as a late replacement in the second test.

He would continue with kicking – and in the 2003-04 Celtic League, he would achieve a world record of 44 consecutive kicks at goal for the now defunct Celtic Warriors.

His final match for Wales was against Barbarian F.C. on May 31, 2003 at the Millennium Stadium, where he played his 100th and final match in a Wales jersey. Wales lost 48-35 in an emotional farewell that celebrated Jenkins' legacy. Jenkins was left out of Wales' 2003 Rugby World Cup squad, and subsequently announced his retirement from international rugby after an 11-year career.

During his 87 caps for Wales he scored 1,049 points (11 tries, 130 conversions, 235 penalties and 10 drop goals) and a further 41 points (1 conversion and 13 penalties) during his four caps for the British & Irish Lions for a grand total of 1,090 points. He retired as the only player to score over 1,000 points in international rugby. Jenkins' world record was subsequently broken by Jonny Wilkinson.

Despite early public criticism, Jenkins became a prominent figure in Welsh rugby. He was the first player to score 1,000 points in international ruby and, although he has since been surpassed as the leading points scorer in Test history, he is widely regarded as one of the sport's most accomplished goal-kickers.

== Coaching career ==
In the autumn of 2004 Jenkins returned to the Welsh Rugby Union in the capacity of Kicking Skills Coach, working with the then newly formed WRU Academies to improve the future generations of outside halves. In the summer of 2006, he returned to the National Squad set up as Skills Coach where he first worked for Gareth Jenkins during the 2007 Rugby World Cup campaign and subsequently Warren Gatland's new-look management team.

During the 2007–2008 season, Jenkins helped the Welsh national team to a second Six Nations Grand Slam in four years.

=== British and Irish Lions ===
On 8 June 2009, Jenkins was appointed as the British and Irish Lions' specialist kicking coach for their tour of South Africa.

He was then reappointed as a coach for the Lions for their 2013 Tour to Australia alongside Graham Rowntree and head coach Warren Gatland. He was subsequently named in the coaching team for the 2017 and 2021 tours, again alongside Gatland on both, and Rowntree in 2017.

== Off the Field ==
In 1999, Jenkins published his autobiography: Life at number 10: An Autobiography with freelance journalist Paul Rees just a matter of weeks before breaking the International points scoring record. The book was republished in 2001 by Mainstream Publishing.

Also, on 10 November 2003 a DVD was released as a tribute, called Jenks – A Rugby Legend, the DVD tells the story of Jenkins from his start as a working class boy in the Welsh Valleys to the pinnacle of rugby.

In honour of Jenkins' Testimonial career, the famous Grogg Shop in Pontypridd made a "Limited Edition Testimonial Action" Grogg of Jenkins. Wanting to make something special for the occasion, the Grogg was the first ever to stand on just one leg and took over 6 months to create. Only 100 were made, all of which were hand-painted in a variety of rugby kits – only three of which were in the Lions jersey, one owned by Jenkins, one by his mother and the other by Mike Donald of Ebby Wale who bought the Grogg at an auction for £4,100.

== See also ==
- List of leading rugby union test point scorers
- List of rugby union test caps leaders
