= 2024–25 Scarlets season =

Scarlets
- 2024–25 season
- Head coach: Dwayne Peel
- Chairman: Simon Muderack
- United Rugby Championship: 8th
- URC play-offs: Quarter-finals
- Challenge Cup: Round of 16
- Top try scorer: League: Blair Murray (8); All: Blair Murray (11)
- Top points scorer: League: Ioan Lloyd (124); All: Ioan Lloyd (150)
- Highest home attendance: 11,384 vs Ospreys (29 March 2025)
- Lowest home attendance: 5,080 vs Connacht (4 October 2024)

The 2024–25 season was the 22nd season in the history of the Scarlets, a Welsh regional rugby union side based in Llanelli, Carmarthenshire. In this season, they competed in the United Rugby Championship, its URC Welsh Shield competition and the European Rugby Challenge Cup. After finishing eighth in the United Rugby Championship, they were eliminated in the quarter-finals of the play-offs, losing 33–21 at Leinster. They finished third in their Challenge Cup pool, but were eliminated in the round of 16 after losing 36–14 to their West Wales rivals, the Ospreys.

== Friendlies ==
Date	Opponents	H / A	Result F–A	Scorers	Attendance
31 August 2024	Carmarthen Quins	A	26–14	Tries: B. Williams 10'c, R. Lewis 24' c, Phillips 64' c, Taylor 67' m Conversions: Price (2) 10', 24', Jac Jones 64'	800
7 September 2024	Leicester Tigers	A	7–31	Tries: Taylor 20' c Conversions: Lloyd 20'	
13 September 2024	Saracens	A	21–40	Tries: Lloyd 16' c, Penalty try 33', S. O'Connor 53' c Conversions: Costelow 16', Titcombe 53'	

== United Rugby Championship ==
=== League phase ===
==== Fixtures ====
The fixture schedule for the 2024–25 season was announced on 30 May 2024.

Date	Opponents	H / A	Result F–A	Scorers	Attendance	Table position
21 September 2024	Benetton	A	20–20	Tries: Page 40' c, Taylor 52' c Conversions: Lloyd (2) 41', 53'; Penalties: Lloyd (2) 59', 67'	3,243	7th
28 September 2024	Cardiff	H	15–24	Tries: Page 1' c, Plumtree 10' m Conversions: Costelow 1'; Penalties: Costelow 4'	7,394	13th
4 October 2024	Connacht	H	23–24	Tries: G. Davies (2) 21' c, 29' c Conversions: Costelow (2) 22', 30'; Penalties: Costelow (2) 42', 73', Lloyd 52'	5,080	14th
12 October 2024	Cardiff	A	25–19	Tries: G. Davies (2) 32' m, 46' c, J. Williams 59' c Conversions: Lloyd (2) 47', 60'; Penalties: Lloyd (2) 8', 16'	12,125	10th
18 October 2024	Bulls	H	23–22	Tries: Macleod 11' c, Murray 41' m, Rogers 71' m Conversions: Lloyd 12'; Penalties: Lloyd (2) 40', 52'	5,274	10th
25 October 2024	Zebre	H	30–8	Tries: Rogers 27' m, Page 42' c, Murray 46' m, Macleod 56' c Conversions: Lloyd (2) 44', 58'; Penalties: Lloyd (2) 4', 23'	5,892	6th
29 November 2024	Glasgow Warriors	A	15–17	Tries: Macleod 10' m, Nicholas 46' c Conversions: Lloyd 47'; Penalties: Lloyd 7'	6,403	9th
21 December 2024	Ospreys	A	22–23	Tries: Mee 41' c Conversions: Lloyd 42'; Penalties: Lloyd (4) 15', 18', 26', 32', Costelow 56'	6,836	8th
1 January 2025	Dragons	H	32–15	Tries: Murray (2) 7' c, 15' c, Macleod 29' c, Mee 42' m Conversions: Costelow (3) 8', 16', 31'; Penalties: Costelow 11', Lloyd 69'	7,605	6th
25 January 2025	Edinburgh	H	30–24	Tries: Van der Merwe 24' c, Macleod 46' c, Nicholas 59' c Conversions: Lloyd (3) 24', 47', 60'; Penalties: Lloyd (3) 6', 13', 80'	5,756	6th
15 February 2025	Munster	A	8–29	Tries: Page 57' m Penalties: Lloyd 17'	13,714	8th
1 March 2025	Ulster	A	28–30	Tries: Page 4' c, Nicholas 10' m, Fifita 57' c Conversions: Lloyd (2) 5', 58'; Penalties: Lloyd (3) 41', 46', 70'	11,717	10th
22 March 2025	Stormers	H	17–29	Tries: Mee 29' c, Nicholas 47' c Conversions: Lloyd (2) 30', 48'; Penalties : Lloyd 58'	5,783	14th
29 March 2025	Ospreys	H	38–22	Tries: Murray 20' m, Penalty try 33', Fifita 39' m, Roberts 43' c, James 49' c, Plumtree 60' c Conversions: Lloyd (3) 44', 50', 61'	11,384	11th
19 April 2025	Dragons	A (Note: Although the fixture was designated as an away game, the match was played at the Millennium Stadium as part of the Judgement Day event.)	31–23	Tries: Thomas 19' c, Hepburn 49' c, Fifita 54' c, Murray 71' c Conversions: Lloyd (4) 20', 50', 55', 72'; Penalty: Lloyd 80'	28,328	9th
26 April 2025	Leinster	H	35–22	Tries: G. Davies 8' c, Rogers 21' m, Plumtree 29' c, Roberts 41' c Conversions: Costelow (3) 8', 30', 42'; Penalties: Costelow 12', Lloyd (2) 54', 79'	7,381	7th
11 May 2025	Lions	A	32–19	Tries: Murray (2) 14'c, 27' c, Penalty try 33', Plumtree 44' m, J. Williams 71' c Conversions: Costelow (3) 15', 28', 72'; Penalty: Costelow 79'; Drop goal: Costelow 40'	2,522	6th
17 May 2025	Sharks	A	3–12	Drop goal: Costelow 40'		8th

==== Tables ====
Overall

Pos	Team	Pld	W	D	L	PF	PA	PD	TF	TA	TB	LB	Pts	Qualification
1	Leinster (CH)	18	16	0	2	542	256	+286	79	35	11	1	76	Qualifies for home URC quarter-final; Qualification for the 2025–26 Champions Cup
2	Bulls (RU)	18	14	0	4	542	361	+181	71	44	9	3	68	Qualifies for home URC quarter-final; Qualification for the 2025–26 Champions Cup
3	Sharks	18	13	0	5	436	402	+34	55	59	7	3	62	Qualifies for home URC quarter-final; Qualification for the 2025–26 Champions Cup
4	Glasgow Warriors	18	11	0	7	468	327	+141	70	40	10	5	59	Qualifies for home URC quarter-final; Qualification for the 2025–26 Champions Cup
5	Stormers	18	10	0	8	507	418	+89	66	57	11	4	55	Qualifies for URC quarter-final; Qualification for the 2025–26 Champions Cup
6	Munster	18	9	0	9	444	429	+15	67	59	11	4	51	Qualifies for URC quarter-final; Qualification for the 2025–26 Champions Cup
7	Edinburgh	18	8	1	9	471	407	+64	66	57	9	6	49	Qualifies for URC quarter-final; Qualification for the 2025–26 Champions Cup
8	Scarlets	18	9	1	8	427	382	+45	50	52	6	4	48	Qualifies for URC quarter-final; Qualification for the 2025–26 Champions Cup
9	Cardiff	18	8	1	9	409	477	−68	63	65	10	3	47	Qualification for the 2025–26 Challenge Cup
10	Benetton	18	9	1	8	393	478	−85	50	65	7	1	46	Qualification for the 2025–26 Challenge Cup
11	Lions	18	8	0	10	402	440	−38	53	60	5	3	40	Qualification for the 2025–26 Challenge Cup
12	Ospreys	18	7	1	10	437	454	−17	60	63	6	4	40	Qualification for the 2025–26 Challenge Cup
13	Connacht	18	6	0	12	420	472	−52	64	62	9	6	39	Qualification for the 2025–26 Challenge Cup
14	Ulster	18	7	0	11	414	506	−92	59	72	5	5	38	Qualification for the 2025–26 Challenge Cup
15	Zebre Parma	18	5	1	12	302	503	−201	38	72	3	4	29	Qualification for the 2025–26 Challenge Cup
16	Dragons	18	1	0	17	335	637	−302	43	92	1	4	9	Qualification for the 2025–26 Challenge Cup

Source: UnitedRugby.com
Rules for classification: Tiebreakers for teams tied on points: 1) Number of matches won 2) The difference between points for and points against 3) The number of tries scored 4) The most points scored 5) The difference between tries for and tries against 6) The fewest red cards received 7) The fewest yellow cards received.

Welsh Shield

2024–25 United Rugby Championship Regional Shield Pools
(Wales) Welsh Shield
	Team	P	W	D	L	PF	PA	PD	TF	TA	TBP	LBP	Pts	Pos overall
1	(Wales) Cardiff (S)	6	4	1	1	147	117	+30	23	14	4	1	23	9
2	(Wales) Scarlets	6	4	0	2	163	126	+37	20	18	3	1	20	7
3	(Wales) Ospreys	6	2	1	3	155	156	–1	21	20	1	1	12	12
4	(Wales) Dragons	6	1	0	5	130	196	–66	15	27	0	1	5	16
If teams are level at any stage, tiebreakers are applied in the following order: 1. number of matches won 2. the difference between points for and points against 3. the number of tries scored 4. the most points scored 5. the difference between tries for and tries against 6. the fewest red cards received 7. the fewest yellow cards received
Green background indicates teams currently leading the regional shield. Upon the conclusion of the regular season, these teams win their respective regional shields. (S) : URC Shield champion

=== Play-offs ===
Date	Round	Opponents	H / A	Result F–A	Scorers	Attendance
31 May 2025	Quarter-finals	Leinster	A	21–33	Tries: Rogers 19' c, Murray 40' c, Williams 70' c Conversions: Costelow (2) 20', 40+1', Lloyd 70'	12,879

== European Rugby Challenge Cup ==
=== Pool stage ===
==== Fixtures ====
Date	Opponents	H / A	Result F–A	Scorers	Attendance	Table position
7 December 2024	Bayonne	A	16–17	Tries: Sh. Evans 41' c Conversions: Lloyd 42'; Penalties: Lloyd (3) 4', 35', 74'	9,752	4th
15 December 2024	Black Lion	H	36–18	Tries: G. Davies 2' c, Macleod (2) 12' m, 42' c, J. Williams 28' c, Hughes 78' c Conversions: Costelow (4) 3', 28', 44', 79'; Penalties: Costelow 68'	6,013	3rd
10 January 2025	Gloucester	A	7–31	Tries: James 64' c Conversions: Lloyd 65'	11,441	5th
18 January 2025	Vannes	H	38–28	Tries: Macleod (2) 6' c, 20' c, Murray 26' m, G. Davies 32' c, Rogers 37' m, Van der Merwe 53' m Conversions: Lloyd (4) 7', 21', 33', 54'	5,773	3rd

==== Table ====
EPCR Challenge Cup Pool 3
Pos	Team	Pld	W	D	L	PF	PA	PD	TF	TA	TB	LB	Pts	Qualification
1	(Scotland) Edinburgh (3)	4	3	0	1	127	67	+60	18	9	3	1	16	Home round of 16
2	(France) Bayonne (6)	4	3	0	1	125	101	+24	18	12	2	0	14	Home round of 16
3	(Wales) Scarlets (13)	4	2	0	2	97	94	+3	13	13	2	1	11	Away round of 16
4	(England) Gloucester (15)	4	2	0	2	82	115	−33	12	16	1	0	9	Away round of 16
5	(France) Vannes	4	1	0	3	115	108	+7	14	14	2	2	8	
6	(Georgia (country)) Black Lion	4	1	0	3	71	132	−61	6	17	0	0	4	

Source: EPCR
Rules for classification: Tiebreakers for teams tied on points: 1) Number of matches won; 2) Difference between points for and against; 3) Total number of points for; 4) Aggregate number of points scored in matches between tied teams; 5) Number of matches won excluding the first match, then the second and so on until the tie is settled.

=== Knockout stage ===
Date	Round	Opponents	H / A	Result F–A	Scorers	Attendance
6 April 2025	Round of 16	Ospreys	A	14–36	Tries: Murray 10' c, James 70' c Conversions: Lloyd (2) 11', 71'	9,057

== Statistics ==
(+ in the Apps column denotes substitute appearance, positions listed are the ones they have started a game in during the season)

Pos.	Name	United Rugby Championship						URC play-offs						European Challenge Cup						Total						Discipline	
Pos.	Name	Apps	Try	Con	Pen	Drop	Pts	Apps	Try	Con	Pen	Drop	Pts	Apps	Try	Con	Pen	Drop	Pts	Apps	Try	Con	Pen	Drop	Pts	Yellow card	Red card
FB	(Wales) Jac Davies	1+1	0	0	0	0	0	0	0	0	0	0	0	0	0	0	0	0	0	1+1	0	0	0	0	0	0	0
FB/WG	(Wales) Blair Murray	13	8	0	0	0	40	1	1	0	0	0	5	3	2	0	0	0	10	17	11	0	0	0	55	0	0
FB	(Wales) Ioan Nicholas	8+3	4	0	0	0	20	0	0	0	0	0	0	2+3	0	0	0	0	0	10+6	4	0	0	0	20	1	0
WG	(Wales) Steff Evans	2	0	0	0	0	0	0	0	0	0	0	0	0	0	0	0	0	0	2	0	0	0	0	0	0	0
WG	(Wales) Tomi Lewis	1+1	0	0	0	0	0	0	0	0	0	0	0	0	0	0	0	0	0	1+1	0	0	0	0	0	0	0
WG/FB	(Wales) Ellis Mee	11+1	3	0	0	0	15	1	0	0	0	0	0	5	0	0	0	0	0	17+1	3	0	0	0	15	0	0
WG/FB	(Wales) Tom Rogers	12	3	0	0	0	15	1	1	0	0	0	5	3	1	0	0	0	5	16	5	0	0	0	25	2	0
CE	(Wales) Eddie James	8+3	1	0	0	0	5	0	0	0	0	0	0	4+1	2	0	0	0	10	12+4	3	0	0	0	15	0	0
CE	(Wales) Macs Page	9+5	5	0	0	0	25	0+1	0	0	0	0	0	1+1	0	0	0	0	0	10+7	5	0	0	0	25	0	0
CE	(Wales) Joe Roberts	8+2	2	0	0	0	10	1	0	0	0	0	0	3+1	0	0	0	0	0	12+3	2	0	0	0	10	1	0
CE	(Wales) Johnny Williams	14+1	2	0	0	0	10	1	1	0	0	0	5	1	1	0	0	0	5	16+1	4	0	0	0	20	0	0
FH	(Wales) Sam Costelow	8+2	0	11	7	2	49	1	0	2	0	0	4	2	0	4	1	0	11	11+2	0	17	8	2	64	0	0
FH/FB	(Wales) Ioan Lloyd	13+5	0	23	26	0	124	0+1	0	1	0	0	2	4+1	0	8	3	0	24	17+7	0	32	29	0	150	0	0
FH	(England) Charlie Titcombe	0+1	0	0	0	0	0	0	0	0	0	0	0	0+2	0	0	0	0	0	0+3	0	0	0	0	0	0	0
SH	(Wales) Gareth Davies	17	5	0	0	0	25	0	0	0	0	0	0	3+1	2	0	0	0	10	20+1	7	0	0	0	35	0	0
SH	(Wales) Archie Hughes	1+6	0	0	0	0	0	1	0	0	0	0	0	2+1	1	0	0	0	5	4+7	1	0	0	0	5	0	0
SH	(Wales) Efan Jones	0+3	0	0	0	0	0	0+1	0	0	0	0	0	1+2	0	0	0	0	0	1+6	0	0	0	0	0	0	0
N8/FL	(Wales) Taine Plumtree	15+2	4	0	0	0	20	1	0	0	0	0	0	4	0	0	0	0	0	20+2	4	0	0	0	20	1	0
N8	(Wales) Carwyn Tuipulotu	0+1	0	0	0	0	0	0	0	0	0	0	0	0	0	0	0	0	0	0+1	0	0	0	0	0	0	0
N8	(Wales) Ben Williams	0	0	0	0	0	0	0	0	0	0	0	0	0	0	0	0	0	0	0	0	0	0	0	0	0	0
FL	(Wales) Dan Davis	5+6	0	0	0	0	0	0+1	0	0	0	0	0	1+1	0	0	0	0	0	6+8	0	0	0	0	0	1	0
FL/N8	(Tonga) Vaea Fifita	11+2	3	0	0	0	15	1	0	0	0	0	0	5	0	0	0	0	0	17+2	3	0	0	0	15	2	0
FL	(Wales) Josh Macleod	15	5	0	0	0	25	1	0	0	0	0	0	4	4	0	0	0	20	20	9	0	0	0	45	2	0
FL	(South Africa) Jarrod Taylor	3+9	1	0	0	0	5	0+1	0	0	0	0	0	1+5	0	0	0	0	0	4+15	1	0	0	0	5	0	0
LK	(Scotland) Alex Craig	13+5	0	0	0	0	0	1	0	0	0	0	0	2+2	0	0	0	0	0	16+7	0	0	0	0	0	0	0
LK	(Australia) Max Douglas	11	0	0	0	0	0	0	0	0	0	0	0	3+1	0	0	0	0	0	14+1	0	0	0	0	0	1	0
LK	(Wales) Morgan Jones	0	0	0	0	0	0	0	0	0	0	0	0	0	0	0	0	0	0	0	0	0	0	0	0	0	0
LK	(Tonga) Sam Lousi	16	0	0	0	0	0	1	0	0	0	0	0	3+2	0	0	0	0	0	20+2	0	0	0	0	0	3	0
LK	(Wales) Jac Price	1+9	0	0	0	0	0	0	0	0	0	0	0	2+1	0	0	0	0	0	3+10	0	0	0	0	0	0	0
LK	(Wales) Ed Scragg	0	0	0	0	0	0	0	0	0	0	0	0	0	0	0	0	0	0	0	0	0	0	0	0	0	0
HK	(Wales) Ryan Elias	8+7	0	0	0	0	0	1	0	0	0	0	0	1	0	0	0	0	0	10+7	0	0	0	0	0	1	0
HK	(Wales) Shaun Evans	0+2	0	0	0	0	0	0	0	0	0	0	0	1+3	1	0	0	0	5	1+5	1	0	0	0	5	0	0
HK	(South Africa) Marnus van der Merwe	11+7	1	0	0	0	5	0+1	0	0	0	0	0	3+1	1	0	0	0	5	14+9	2	0	0	0	10	0	0
PR	(England) Gabe Hawley	0+3	0	0	0	0	0	0	0	0	0	0	0	0+1	0	0	0	0	0	0+4	0	0	0	0	0	0	0
PR	(Scotland) Alec Hepburn	13+4	1	0	0	0	5	1	0	0	0	0	0	2+2	0	0	0	0	0	16+6	1	0	0	0	5	4	0
PR	(Australia) Archer Holz	2+2	0	0	0	0	0	0	0	0	0	0	0	0+2	0	0	0	0	0	2+4	0	0	0	0	0	0	0
PR	(Wales) Kemsley Mathias	5+6	0	0	0	0	0	0+1	0	0	0	0	0	3	0	0	0	0	0	8+7	0	0	0	0	0	0	0
PR	(Wales) Harri O'Connor	0	0	0	0	0	0	0	0	0	0	0	0	0	0	0	0	0	0	0	0	0	0	0	0	0	0
PR	(Wales) Sam O'Connor	0+7	0	0	0	0	0	0	0	0	0	0	0	0+3	0	0	0	0	0	0+10	0	0	0	0	0	0	0
PR	(Wales) Henry Thomas	14	1	0	0	0	5	1	0	0	0	0	0	4	0	0	0	0	0	19	1	0	0	0	5	0	0
PR	(Wales) Louie Trevett	0+1	0	0	0	0	0	0	0	0	0	0	0	0	0	0	0	0	0	0+1	0	0	0	0	0	0	0
PR	(Wales) Sam Wainwright	2+12	0	0	0	0	0	0+1	0	0	0	0	0	1+1	0	0	0	0	0	3+14	0	0	0	0	0	0	0

Stats correct as of match played 17 May 2025

== Transfers ==
=== In ===
Date confirmed	Pos.	Name	From	Ref.
29 February 2024	HK	(South Africa) Marnus van der Merwe	(South Africa) Cheetahs	
23 May 2024	PR	(Scotland) Alec Hepburn	(England) Exeter Chiefs	
23 May 2024	FB	(England) Ellis Mee	(England) Nottingham	
28 May 2024	LK	(Australia) Max Douglas	(Japan) Yokohama Canon Eagles	
10 June 2024	PR	(Wales) Henry Thomas	(France) Castres Olympique	
13 June 2024	WG	(New Zealand) Blair Murray	(New Zealand) Canterbury	
4 September 2024	PR	(Australia) Archer Holz	(Australia) Waratahs	
3 April 2025	PR	(Wales) Louie Trevett	(England) Bristol Bears (loan)	

=== Out ===
Date confirmed	Pos.	Name	To	Ref.
5 April 2024	PR	(Wales) Steffan Thomas	Ospreys	
18 April 2024	SH	(Wales) Kieran Hardy	Ospreys	
9 May 2024	HK	(Wales) Lewis Morgan	Released	
9 May 2024	FL	(Wales) Iwan Shenton	Released	
9 May 2024	CE	(Wales) Jonathan Davies (Note: On 13 October 2024, Davies announced his retirement from professional rugby without re-signing for another club.)	Released	
9 May 2024	CE	(Wales) Iestyn Gwilliam	Released	
9 May 2024	CE	(Wales) Scott Williams	Released	
9 May 2024	WG	(Wales) Callum Williams	Released	
13 May 2024	PR	(Wales) Joe Jones	(England) Doncaster Knights	
9 June 2024	FL	(Wales) Luca Giannini	Swansea RFC	
26 June 2024	HK	(South Africa) Eduan Swart	(South Africa) Pumas	
12 July 2024	FH	(Wales) Dan Jones	(England) Ealing Trailfinders	
22 July 2024	FL	(Scotland) Teddy Leatherbarrow	(England) Sedgley Park Tigers	
31 July 2024	PR	(Wales) Wyn Jones	(England) Harlequins	
30 August 2024	WG	(Wales) Ryan Conbeer	Ospreys	
10 February 2025	N8	(Wales) Carwyn Tuipulotu	(France) Pau	
