= 2023–24 Scarlets season =

Scarlets
- 2023–24 season
- Head coach: Dwayne Peel
- Chairman: Simon Muderack
- United Rugby Championship: 13th (Welsh Shield: 2nd)
- Challenge Cup: Pool stage, 6th
- Top try scorer: League: Gareth Davies (7); All: Gareth Davies (7)
- Top points scorer: League: Ioan Lloyd (67); All: Ioan Lloyd (91)
- Highest home attendance: 11,282 vs Ospreys (URC, 26 December 2023)
- Lowest home attendance: 5,830 vs Black Lion (Challenge Cup, 15 December 2023)
- Average home attendance: 6,935

The 2023–24 season is the 20th season in the history of the Scarlets, a Welsh regional rugby union side based in Llanelli, Carmarthenshire. In this season, they are competing in the United Rugby Championship and the European Rugby Challenge Cup.

== Friendlies ==
On 12 June 2023, the Scarlets announced that they would face the Barbarians in a pre-season friendly. The game would be marked as the Phil Bennett Memorial Game and the culmination of the 150-year anniversary celebration since Llanelli RFC were founded. Former Scarlets players Aaron Shingler and Rob Evans were named as part of the Barbarians squad. The Scarlets won the game 33–19 despite Evans scoring for the Barbarians in the 46th minute.

Date	Opponents	H / A	Result F–A	Scorers	Attendance
16 September 2023	Barbarians	H	33–19	Tries: Plumtree 25' m, Sh. Evans 33' c, McNicholl 40' c, Hughes 42' c, James 70' c Conversions: Lloyd (3) 33', 40', 70', D. Jones 42'	5,906
29 September 2023	Cardiff	A	12–21	Tries: Morgan 36' m, Hardy 76' c Conversions: Titcombe 76'	4,289
6 October 2023	Dragons	H	24–31	Tries: Plumtree 3' c, Hardy 35' m, James 51' m, Lewis 76' c Conversions: Lloyd 3', Titcombe 76'	
10 February 2024	Exeter Chiefs	A	19–57	Tries: Morgan 19' c, Conbeer 25' m, S. Williams 53' c Conversions: Titcombe 19', 53'	8,623

== United Rugby Championship ==
=== Fixtures ===
Date	Opponents	H / A	Result F–A	Scorers	Attendance	Table position
22 October 2023	Bulls	A	21–63	Tries: McNicholl 30' c, Plumtree (2) 38' c, 68' c Conversions: Lloyd (3) 31', 39', 68'	3,359	16th
28 October 2023	Stormers	A	7–52	Tries: Hardy 16' c Conversions: Lloyd 17'	4,141	16th
4 November 2023	Cardiff	H	31–25	Tries: Craig 19' c, McNicholl 37' c, G. Davies 52' c, Fifita 64' c Conversions: Lloyd (4) 20', 38', 54', 65'; Penalties: Lloyd 73'	6,325	12th
11 November 2023	Lions	H	23–24	Tries: Rogers 17' c, Elias 68' c Conversions: Lloyd (2) 18', 69'; Penalties: Lloyd (3) 3', 47', 54'	6,202	14th
18 November 2023	Leinster	A	5–54	Tries: J. Williams 26' m	15,434	15th
25 November 2023	Ospreys	A	9–31	Penalties: Lloyd (3) 4', 12', 26'	8,090	16th
2 December 2023	Cardiff	A	29–23	Tries: G. Davies (2) 12' c, 39' c, Craig 23' m, St. Evans 61' m, McNicholl 70'; Conversions: Lloyd (2) 13', 40'	8,282	13th
26 December 2023	Ospreys	H	11–25	Tries: G. Davies 41' m Penalties: Lloyd (2) 68', 80'	11,282	14th
1 January 2024	Dragons	A	12–13	Tries: Rogers 20' c, Lloyd 68' m Conversions: Costelow 21'	7,617	13th
16 February 2024	Munster	H	7–42	Tries: Roberts 49' c Conversions: Titcombe 50'	7,039	14th
2 March 2024	Connacht	A	10–26	Tries: E. Jones 26' c Conversions: D. Jones 27'; Penalties: D. Jones 46'	5,241	14th
23 March 2024	Benetton	H	16–13	Tries: Swart 83' c Conversions: Costelow 86'; Penalties: Costelow (3) 2', 51', 55'	6,482	13th
30 March 2024	Glasgow Warriors	H	3–45	Penalties: Lloyd 16'	6,499	14th
20 April 2024	Edinburgh	A	18–43	Tries: Rogers 5' c, G. Davies 27' m Conversions: Costelow 6'; Penalties: Costelow (2) 21', 56'	6,887	14th
26 April 2024	Sharks	H	27–32	Tries: Elias 18' c, Mathias 51' c, Nicholas 76' c Conversions: Costelow (3) 19', 52', 76'; Penalties: Costelow (2) 2', 10'	6,820	14th
11 May 2024	Ulster	H	20–31	Tries: Tuipulotu 60' c, Lewis 66' c Conversions: Costelow (2) 61', 67'; Penalties: Costelow (2) 10', 26'	6,881	14th
17 May 2024	Zebre	A	32–18	Tries: Elias 15' m, G. Davies (2) 20' c, 31' c, Lewis 42' c Conversions: Lloyd (3) 21', 32', 43'; Penalties: Costelow (2) 68', 72'	2,500	14th
1 June 2024	Dragons	H (Note: Although the fixture is designated as a Home game, the match will be played at the Cardiff City Stadium as part of the Judgement Day event.)	32–15	Tries: Mathias 28' c, Davis 37' c, Lewis (2) 43' c, 53' m Conversions: Costelow (2) 29', 44', Lloyd 39'; Penalties: Costelow (2) 14', 73'	20,167	13th

=== Tables ===
Overall

Pos	Team	Pld	W	D	L	F	A	PD	BP	Pts
12	(Wales) Cardiff	18	4	1	13	389	414	-25	14	32
13	(Wales) Scarlets	18	5	0	13	313	575	-262	7	27
14	(South Africa) Sharks	18	4	0	14	343	431	-88	9	25

Welsh Shield

Pos	Team	Pld	W	D	L	F	A	PD	BP	Pts
1	(Wales) Ospreys	6	5	0	1	147	103	+44	4	24
2	(Wales) Scarlets	6	3	0	3	124	132	-8	4	16
3	(Wales) Cardiff	6	2	0	4	169	150	+19	6	14
4	(Wales) Dragons	6	2	0	4	91	146	-55	1	9

== European Rugby Challenge Cup ==
=== Fixtures ===
Date	Opponents	H / A	Result F–A	Scorers	Attendance	Table position
9 December 2023	Castres	A	16–34	Tries: Lloyd 50' c Conversions: Lloyd 51'; Penalties: Lloyd (3) 12', 16', 35'	8,311	6th
15 December 2023	Black Lion	H	7–23	Tries: Fifita 3' c Conversions: Lloyd 4'	5,830	6th
13 January 2024	Clermont Auvergne	A	17–38	Tries: St. Evans 69' c, Hardy 79' c Conversions: Lloyd (2) 70', 79'; Penalties: Costelow 32'	15,552	6th
19 January 2024	Edinburgh	H	19–31	Tries: Roberts 14' m, Conbeer 79' c, Penalty Try 80'; Conversions: Lloyd 79'	5,993	6th

=== Table ===
2023–24 EPCR Challenge Cup Pool 3
Pos	Team	Pld	W	D	L	PF	PA	PD	TF	TA	TB	LB	Pts	Qualification
1	(England) Gloucester (2)	4	4	0	0	99	52	+47	9	7	1	0	17	Qualifies for a home Round of 16
2	(France) Clermont (4)	4	3	0	1	122	66	+56	17	7	3	0	15	Qualifies for a home Round of 16
3	(Scotland) Edinburgh (8)	4	2	0	2	103	92	+11	15	12	2	1	11	Qualifies for a home Round of 16 as second 3rd best
4	(France) Castres (15)	4	2	0	2	88	91	−3	13	10	2	0	10	Qualifies for Round of 16
5	(Georgia (country)) Black Lion	4	1	0	3	42	86	−44	3	10	0	1	5	
6	(Wales) Scarlets	4	0	0	4	59	126	−67	7	18	0	0	0	

Source: EPCR

== Statistics ==
(+ in the Apps column denotes substitute appearance, positions listed are the ones they have started a game in during the season)

Pos.	Name	United Rugby Championship						European Challenge Cup						Total						Discipline	
Pos.	Name	Apps	Try	Con	Pen	Drop	Pts	Apps	Try	Con	Pen	Drop	Pts	Apps	Try	Con	Pen	Drop	Pts	Yellow card	Red card
FB	(Wales) Johnny McNicholl	7	3	0	0	0	15	0	0	0	0	0	0	7	3	0	0	0	15	0	0
FB	(Wales) Ioan Nicholas	10+6	1	0	0	0	5	1+3	0	0	0	0	0	11+9	1	0	0	0	5	0	0
WG	(Wales) Ryan Conbeer	7+4	0	0	0	0	0	3	1	0	0	0	5	10+4	1	0	0	0	5	0	0
WG	(Wales) Steff Evans	6+2	1	0	0	0	5	4	1	0	0	0	5	10+2	2	0	0	0	10	1	0
WG	(Wales) Tomi Lewis	10	4	0	0	0	20	0+1	0	0	0	0	0	10+1	4	0	0	0	20	0	0
WG/FB	(Wales) Tom Rogers	12	3	0	0	0	15	3	0	0	0	0	0	1	3	0	0	0	15	1	0
CE	(Wales) Jonathan Davies	5+2	0	0	0	0	0	2	0	0	0	0	0	7+2	0	0	0	0	0	0	0
CE	(Wales) Eddie James	11+2	0	0	0	0	0	1	0	0	0	0	0	12+2	0	0	0	0	0	1	0
CE	(Wales) Macs Page	0+2	0	0	0	0	0	0	0	0	0	0	0	0+2	0	0	0	0	0	0	0
CE	(Wales) Joe Roberts	8	1	0	0	0	5	2	1	0	0	0	5	10	2	0	0	0	10	0	0
CE	(Wales) Johnny Williams	12	1	0	0	0	5	3	0	0	0	0	0	15	1	0	0	0	5	1	1
CE	(Wales) Scott Williams	0+2	0	0	0	0	0	0	0	0	0	0	0	0+2	0	0	0	0	0	1	0
FH	(Wales) Sam Costelow	7	0	10	13	0	59	1	0	0	1	0	3	8	0	10	14	0	62	0	0
FH	(Wales) Dan Jones	2+2	0	1	1	0	5	0	0	0	0	0	0	2+2	0	1	1	0	5	0	0
FH/CE	(Wales) Ioan Lloyd	11+2	1	16	10	0	67	4	1	5	3	0	24	15+2	2	21	13	0	91	0	0
FH	(England) Charlie Titcombe	1+4	0	1	0	0	2	0+3	0	0	0	0	0	1+7	0	1	0	0	2	0	0
SH	(Wales) Gareth Davies	12	7	0	0	0	35	1+1	0	0	0	0	0	13+1	7	0	0	0	35	1	0
SH	(Wales) Kieran Hardy	4+9	1	0	0	0	5	2+1	1	0	0	0	5	6+10	2	0	0	0	10	1	0
SH	(Wales) Archie Hughes	1+5	0	0	0	0	0	1+2	0	0	0	0	0	2+7	0	0	0	0	0	0	0
SH	(Wales) Efan Jones	1+1	1	0	0	0	5	0	0	0	0	0	0	1+1	1	0	0	0	5	0	0
N8	(Wales) Carwyn Tuipulotu	9+6	1	0	0	0	5	1	0	0	0	0	0	10+6	1	0	0	0	5	0	0
N8	(Wales) Ben Williams	4+6	0	0	0	0	0	3+1	0	0	0	0	0	7+7	0	0	0	0	0	0	0
FL	(Wales) Dan Davis	12	1	0	0	0	5	2	0	0	0	0	0	14	1	0	0	0	5	0	0
FL	(Scotland) Teddy Leatherbarrow	7+2	0	0	0	0	0	2	0	0	0	0	0	9+2	0	0	0	0	0	1	0
FL	(Wales) Josh Macleod	2	0	0	0	0	0	1	0	0	0	0	0	3	0	0	0	0	0	1	0
FL	(Wales) Iwan Shenton	0+2	0	0	0	0	0	0+1	0	0	0	0	0	0+3	0	0	0	0	0	0	0
FL	(South Africa) Jarrod Taylor	1+3	0	0	0	0	0	0	0	0	0	0	0	1+3	0	0	0	0	0	0	0
LK	(Scotland) Alex Craig	16	2	0	0	0	10	3	0	0	0	0	0	19	2	0	0	0	10	1	0
LK	(Tonga) Vaea Fifita	11	1	0	0	0	5	3	1	0	0	0	5	14	2	0	0	0	10	0	0
LK	(Wales) Morgan Jones	5+10	0	0	0	0	0	1+3	0	0	0	0	0	6+13	0	0	0	0	0	0	0
LK	(Tonga) Sam Lousi	9	0	0	0	0	0	0	0	0	0	0	0	9	0	0	0	0	0	1	0
LK	(Wales) Taine Plumtree	8	2	0	0	0	10	0	0	0	0	0	0	8	2	0	0	0	10	1	0
LK	(Wales) Jac Price	7+4	0	0	0	0	0	4	0	0	0	0	0	11+4	0	0	0	0	0	0	0
LK	(Wales) Ed Scragg	0	0	0	0	0	0	0+2	0	0	0	0	0	0+2	0	0	0	0	0	0	0
HK	(Wales) Ryan Elias	11+1	3	0	0	0	15	3	0	0	0	0	0	14+1	3	0	0	0	15	0	0
HK/FL	(Wales) Shaun Evans	6+9	0	0	0	0	0	1+3	0	0	0	0	0	7+12	0	0	0	0	0	0	0
HK	(Wales) Ken Owens	0	0	0	0	0	0	0	0	0	0	0	0	0	0	0	0	0	0	0	0
HK	(South Africa) Eduan Swart	1+2	1	0	0	0	5	0+3	0	0	0	0	0	1+5	1	0	0	0	5	0	0
HK	(Wales) Harry Thomas	0+1	0	0	0	0	0	0	0	0	0	0	0	0+1	0	0	0	0	0	0	0
HK	(Wales) Isaac Young	0+3	0	0	0	0	0	0	0	0	0	0	0	0+3	0	0	0	0	0	0	0
PR	(Wales) Joe Jones	0+5	0	0	0	0	0	2	0	0	0	0	0	2+5	0	0	0	0	0	0	0
PR	(Wales) Wyn Jones	4+13	0	0	0	0	0	0	0	0	0	0	0	4+13	0	0	0	0	0	0	0
PR	(Wales) Samson Lee	0	0	0	0	0	0	0	0	0	0	0	0	0	0	0	0	0	0	0	0
PR	(Wales) Kemsley Mathias	13+1	2	0	0	0	10	1+1	0	0	0	0	0	14+2	2	0	0	0	10	1	0
PR	(Wales) Harri O'Connor	9+4	0	0	0	0	0	1+3	0	0	0	0	0	10+7	0	0	0	0	0	1	0
PR	(Wales) Sam O'Connor	0+1	0	0	0	0	0	0+2	0	0	0	0	0	0+3	0	0	0	0	0	0	0
PR	(Wales) Steffan Thomas	1+6	0	0	0	0	0	3+1	0	0	0	0	0	4+7	0	0	0	0	0	1	0
PR	(Wales) Sam Wainwright	9+4	0	0	0	0	0	1+1	0	0	0	0	0	10+5	0	0	0	0	0	0	0

Stats correct as of match played 1 June 2024

== Transfers ==
=== In ===
Date confirmed	Pos.	Name	From	Ref.
18 April 2023	FH	(Wales) Ioan Lloyd	(England) Bristol Bears	
25 April 2023	WG	(Wales) Tomi Lewis	(England) Jersey Reds	
15 June 2023	FL	(Scotland) Teddy Leatherbarrow	(England) Loughborough University	
15 June 2023	FH	(England) Charlie Titcombe	(England) Loughborough University	
21 June 2023	LK	(Scotland) Alex Craig	(England) Gloucester	
23 June 2023	SH	(Wales) Efan Jones	RGC 1404	
27 June 2023	LK	(Wales) Taine Plumtree	(New Zealand) Blues	
28 June 2023	LK	(Wales) Ed Scragg	(England) London Irish	
24 November 2023	PR	(Wales) Joe Jones	(England) Sale Sharks	
5 December 2023	HK	(South Africa) Eduan Swart	(South Africa) Pumas	
13 February 2024	FL	(South Africa) Jarrod Taylor	(South Africa) Stormers	

=== Out ===
Date confirmed	Pos.	Name	To	Ref.
12 February 2023	N8	(Tonga) Sione Kalamafoni	(France) Vannes	
21 February 2023	PR	(Scotland) Javan Sebastian	(Scotland) Edinburgh	
13 April 2023	SH	(Wales) Dane Blacker	Dragons	
21 April 2023	LK	(England) Tom Price	Released	
21 April 2023	LK	(Wales) Lewis Rawlins	Released	
21 April 2023	FL	(Wales) Aaron Shingler	Retired	
3 May 2023	WG	(Wales) Corey Baldwin	Dragons	
28 May 2023	FL	(Wales) Iestyn Rees	(England) Ampthill	
6 June 2023	LK	(Wales) Griff Evans	(England) Ampthill	
6 June 2023	SH	(Wales) Harri Williams	(England) Ampthill	
15 June 2023	HK	(Wales) Dafydd Hughes	(England) Jersey Reds (Note: On 27 October 2023, Cardiff Rugby announced that they had signed Hughes after Jersey Reds had gone into administration in August 2023.)	
7 July 2023	PR	(Wales) Phil Price	Bridgend Ravens	
12 July 2023	FH	(Wales) Rhys Patchell	(New Zealand) Highlanders	
23 July 2023	PR	(Wales) WillGriff John	(France) Racing 92	
24 July 2023	HK	(Wales) Taylor Davies	Llandovery	
5 November 2023	FB	(Wales) Leigh Halfpenny	(New Zealand) Crusaders	
14 December 2023	PR	(Wales) Samson Lee	Retired	
23 February 2024	FL	(Wales) Iwan Shenton	(England) Ampthill (loan)	
1 March 2024	FB	(Wales) Johnny McNicholl	(New Zealand) Crusaders	
17 April 2024	HK	(Wales) Ken Owens	Retired	
