= Coleg Ceredigion =

College in Ceredigion, Wales

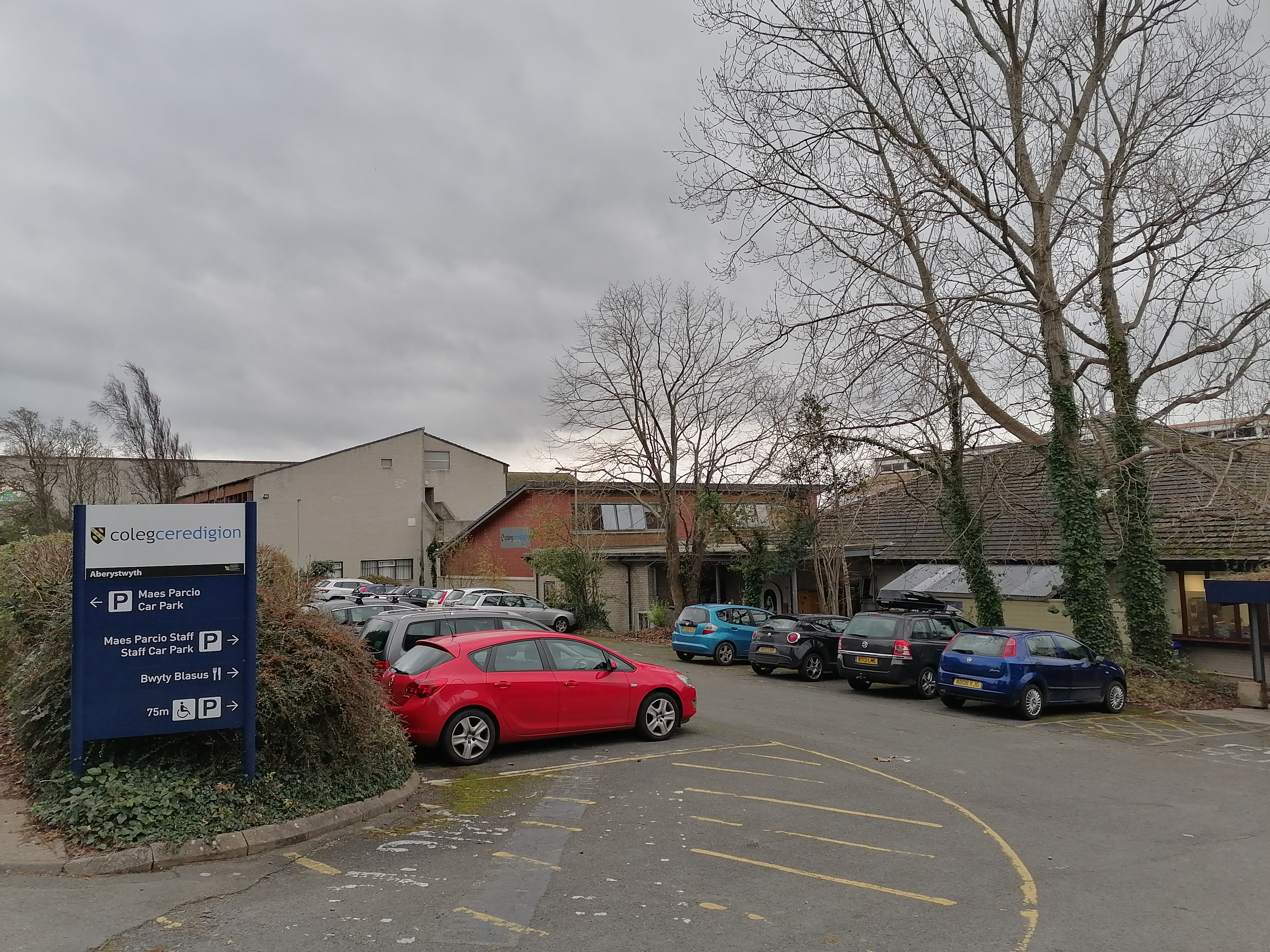
Coleg Ceredigion.jpg

Coleg Ceredigion, formerly known as Aberystwyth Technical College and later as Aberystwyth College of Further Education, is a bilingual further education college in Ceredigion, Wales. It has two campuses in the two largest towns in Ceredigion, namely Aberystwyth (52.4104°N 4.0532°W) and Cardigan (52.0872°N 4.6567°W). The Principal is Andrew Cornish. In 2017, Coleg Ceredigion became a subsidiary of Coleg Sir Gâr.
