= Joe Roberts (rugby union) =

Welsh rugby union player

- Born: 10 May 2000 (age 26) Swansea, Wales
- Height: 1.82 m (6 ft 0 in)
- Weight: 98 kg (216 lb; 15 st 6 lb)
- School: Coedcae School; Coleg Sir Gâr

Rugby union career
- Position: Centre
- Current team: Scarlets
Senior career
Years	Team	Apps	(Points)
2021–	Scarlets	41	(20)
2021–	→ Ampthill (loan)	6	(5)
International career
Years	Team	Apps	(Points)
2019	Wales U20	2	(5)
2023–	Wales	7	(5)

Joe Roberts (born 10 May 2000) is a Welsh professional rugby union player who plays as a centre for United Rugby Championship club Scarlets and the Wales national team.

== Club career ==
Roberts began playing rugby with the New Dock Stars RFC mini rugby team, and also played for the Bynea RFC and Burry Port RFC youth teams. Roberts attended Coleg Sir Gâr, where he played for their rugby team, and came through the Scarlets academy.

Roberts signed his first professional contract for the Scarlets in August 2020. He played for Scarlets A in a developmental match against the Dragons on 16 October 2020.

In March 2021, he joined RFU Championship side Ampthill on loan. He made his debut on 7 March against Doncaster Knights, scoring a try. He would go on to make a further 5 appearances before returning to the Scarlets. Roberts made his competitive debut in the Pro14 Rainbow Cup match against the Ospreys, on 8 May 2021. In May 2021 Roberts signed a contract extension with the Scarlets.

Roberts was named as captain for a Scarlets Development team against Ospreys A on 19 November 2021. He suffered another knee injury in the final fixture of the 2021–22 United Rugby Championship, which kept him out until January 2023. Roberts signed an extension on 19 April 2023, along with fellow centres Eddie James and Ioan Nicholas. Due to a knee injury, Roberts missed the first part of the 2024–25 United Rugby Championship. He signed a contract extension with the Scarlets on 20 March 2025.

== International career ==
In 2018, he was selected for Wales U18 for the U18 International Series in South Africa.

Roberts was selected for Wales U20 for the 2019 Six Nations Under 20s Championship, playing in two matches and scoring a try against France. Roberts suffered a serious leg injury in 2019 which ruled him out of the upcoming season.

On 1 May 2023, Roberts was called up to the Wales 54-man training squad ahead of the 2023 Rugby World Cup. Roberts made his debut on 12 August 2023, starting against England in the 2023 Rugby World Cup warm-up matches. Roberts was not selected for the final squad.

He made his return to the national side for the 2024 Six Nations Championship, and scored a try against France, but suffered a knee injury during the match which ruled him out of the 2024 Wales rugby union tour of Australia.

After returning to fitness, Roberts was selected for the 2025 Six Nations Championship, and started the final match against England on the wing, his first professional appearance in the position.

Roberts featured for Wales in the first test against Japan during the 2025 Wales rugby union tour of Japan. Despite not being named in the initial squad, on 17 November 2025, Roberts was called up by Wales for the remainder of the 2025 end-of-year rugby union internationals.
