= Eddie James (rugby union) =

Welsh rugby union player

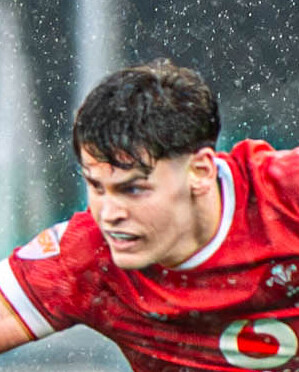
- James in 2025
- Born: Eddie James; 10 August 2002 (age 24) Carmarthen, Wales
- Height: 1.93 m (6 ft 4 in)
- Weight: 110 kg (17 st 5 lb; 243 lb)
- School: Ysgol Bro Myrddin; Coleg Sir Gar

Rugby union career
- Position: Centre
- Current team: Scarlets
Youth career
- Carmarthen Quins
Senior career
Years	Team	Apps	(Points)
2021–2022	Carmarthen Quins	11	(15)
2022–2023	Llanelli	10	(13)
2023–	Scarlets	48	(30)
- Correct as of 18 November 2026
International career
Years	Team	Apps	(Points)
2021–2022	Wales U20	10	(0)
2024–	Wales	13	(10)
- Correct as of 18 November 2026

Eddie James (born 10 August 2002) is a Welsh rugby union player who plays for the Scarlets and Wales national team as a centre.

== Professional career ==
=== Early years and amateur rugby ===
James first played for the Carmarthen Quins youth team, and attended Ysgol Bro Myrddin. He attended Coleg Sir Gar, where he played before joining the Scarlets academy in 2020.

To gain further experience, James went to New Zealand in 2022 to spend three months with Linwood RFC, alongside fellow academy player Sam O'Connor.

James played for both the Quins and Llanelli RFC while attached to the Scarlets academy, making 13 appearances for Llanelli in what was to be their final season in the Welsh Premiership.

=== Scarlets ===
James was named as a replacement for a URC match against the Dragons on 23 April 2022, but did not come off the bench.

James made his first appearance for the Scarlets on 2 September 2022, in a pre-season friendly against Bristol Bears, coming off the bench.

James was named on the bench for the Scarlets in their URC matches against Connacht on 21 October 2022, and the Bulls on 27 January 2023, but was not used in either fixture. He was again selected in the squad to play Edinburgh on 18 February 2023, coming off the bench in the second half to make his competitive debut. James scored the final try as the Scarlets won 42–14.

On 10 March 2023, James made his first start for the Scarlets, in a friendly against the Saracens.

James made his first start in the league on 14 April 2023 against Glasgow Warriors, at inside centre. The following week he signed a contract extension with the Scarlets, along with fellow centres Joe Roberts and Ioan Nicholas.

James was named as the Coaches’ Breakthrough Player of the Season for the 2023–24 season.

James was selected as Man of the Match on 25 October 2024 in a win over Zebre Parma, setting up a try for Macs Page. He signed an extension with the Scarlets on 28 March 2025. He made his 50th appearance for the Scarlets on 24 January 2026, in an extra-time victory over Ulster. On 17 August 2026, James signed a contract extension with the Scarlets.

== International career ==
=== Wales U18 and U20 ===
James was selected for Wales at U18 level, but the season was disrupted due to Coronavirus.

He was selected for Wales U20 for the delayed 2021 Six Nations Under 20s Championship. James spent another year with the side, featuring in the 2022 tournament.

=== Wales ===
On 6 June 2024, James was added to the Wales squad for the tour to Australia. James made his debut on 22 June 2024 against South Africa, coming off the bench.

James made his first start for Wales on 19 July 2024, in an uncapped friendly against Queensland Reds.

James was named in the squad for the 2026 Six Nations by Steve Tandy. During the season he was deployed increasingly at outside centre, with Joe Hawkins partnering him at inside centre for both club and country. James scored for Wales on 4 July 2026, against Fiji. He scored the fourth try against New Zealand, putting Wales back ahead as they beat the All Blacks for the first time in 73 years.
