= Lewis Morgan (rugby union) =

Welsh rugby union player (born 2003)

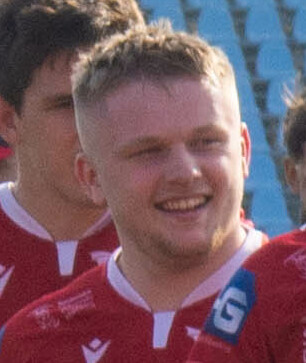
- Morgan at 2021–22 United Rugby Championship
- Born: Lewis Morgan; 1 August 2003 (age 23) Carmarthen, Wales
- Height: 178 cm (5 ft 10 in)
- Weight: 108 kg (17 st 0 lb)
- School: Ysgol Dyffryn Taf; Coleg Sir Gar

Rugby union career
- Position: Hooker
- Current team: Scarlets
Youth career
- -: Tenby RFC
Senior career
Years	Team	Apps	(Points)
2021–	Carmarthen Quins	45	(120)
2021–2024	Scarlets	1	(0)
2025	→ Dragons	1	(0)
- Correct as of 17 May 2025
International career
Years	Team	Apps	(Points)
2023	Wales U20	3	(0)
- Correct as of 27 April 2023

Lewis Morgan (born 1 August 2003) is a Welsh rugby union player who previously played for the Scarlets in the United Rugby Championship as a hooker.

== Professional career ==
Morgan began his career with the Tenby RFC youth side, and has captained Ysgol Sir Gar. Morgan was named in the Scarlets academy squad for the 2021–22 season, having signed his first academy contract in December 2020. Morgan played for local side Carmarthen Quins, and made his debut in November 2021 against regional rivals Llandovery RFC. He made his debut for the Scarlets in Round 14 of the 2021–22 United Rugby Championship against Zebre Parma.

Morgan was selected for Wales U20 for the 2022 Six Nations Under 20s Championship, but did not feature in any of the fixtures. He was selected again for the following years tournament, making his debut against England, and made his first start in the final match, against France.

Morgan was released by the Scarlets at the end of the 2023–24 United Rugby Championship season. Morgan featured for the Carmarthen Quins after his release, and was drafted in by the injury-hit Dragons to provide cover from the bench in their final match of the season, against the Bulls. During the season, Morgan scored 16 tries in 15 appearances for the Quins.
