= Ioan Lloyd =

Welsh rugby union player (born 2001)

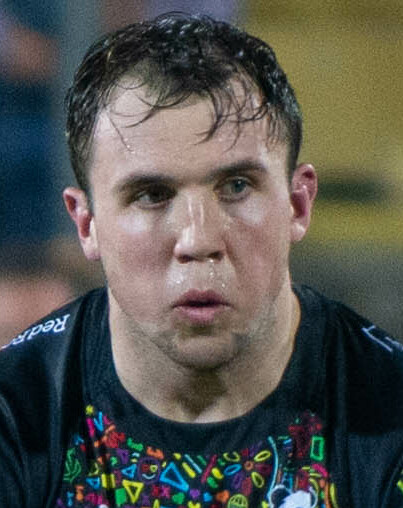
- Lloyd representing Bristol Bears during the EPCR Challenge Cup
- Born: 5 April 2001 (age 25) Cardiff, Wales
- Height: 1.78 m (5 ft 10 in)
- Weight: 85 kg (187 lb; 13 st 5 lb)
- School: Ysgol Gyfun Gymraeg Glantaf; Clifton College

Rugby union career
- Position(s): Fly-half, Fullback
- Current team: Cardiff
Senior career
Years	Team	Apps	(Points)
2019–2023	Bristol Bears	82	(170)
2023–2025	Scarlets	41	(242)
2025–	Cardiff	0	(0)
International career
Years	Team	Apps	(Points)
2020	Wales U20	2	(0)
2020–	Wales	7	(12)

Ioan Lloyd (born 5 April 2001) is a Welsh professional rugby union player who plays as a fly-half for United Rugby Championship club Cardiff and the Wales national team.

== Club career ==
=== Early years ===
Lloyd won the 2015 Dewar Shield with Cardiff Schools before joining Cardiff Blues. He then moved to England, joining Clifton College and was quickly snapped up by Bristol.

=== Bristol ===
He made his first professional appearance playing for Bristol against Bath in the first game of the 2019-2020 Premiership Rugby season and scored two tries in his first two performances.

Lloyd was named man of the match on his competitive debut at fly half, scoring 22 points in a 59–21 win against Zebre Parma in the 2019–20 European Rugby Challenge Cup.

In 2021, Lloyd was named as the Discovery of the Season after a breakout year for Bristol, moving from a bench player to a starter for the first team.

Known for his versatility, Lloyd has started matches at fly half, centre, wing, and fullback, and has covered scrum half during an injury crisis. Ahead of the 2022–23 Premiership Rugby season, Bristol coach Pat Lam indicated that Lloyd’s long term focus would be at inside centre.

On 18 April 2023, it was announced that Lloyd would be joining the Scarlets for the 2023–24 season.

=== Scarlets ===
Lloyd made his first Scarlets appearance in a preseason friendly against the Barbarians along with fellow new signing Taine Plumtree. The pair made their competitive debuts for the Scarlets together against the Bulls on their South African tour.

=== Cardiff ===
On 10 March 2025, Cardiff Rugby announced the signing of Lloyd for the 2025–26 season.

== International career ==
=== Wales U18 and U20 ===
Lloyd played for Wales U18 at the 2019 Six Nations Festival.

Lloyd progressed to the Wales U20 squad for the 2020 Six Nations U20 Championship, starting two matches at fullback.

=== Wales ===
On 6 October 2020 he was named in the senior Wales squad for the 2020 Autumn Nations Cup. He made his debut for Wales on the 18 November 2020 as a second-half replacement the 18-0 win against Georgia. Prior to his international debut, Lloyd had only made four starts for Bristol. Lloyd earned his second cap the next week, coming off the bench against Italy.

Lloyd was selected in the Welsh squad for the 2021 July rugby union tests, but did not feature in any of the match day squads.

Lloyd earned a recall to the Wales squad for the 2024 Six Nations Championship.

== Personal life ==
Lloyd’s younger brother Jac is also a fly half, and has followed in his footsteps: both having played for Wales U20. Jac has also played for Clifton College, and is part of the Bristol Bears academy, like Ioan before him.
