= Wales national rugby union team =

National rugby team

Wales
- Emblem: Three feathers
- Union: Welsh Rugby Union
- Head coach: Steve Tandy
- Captain: Dewi Lake
- Most caps: Alun Wyn Jones (158)
- Top scorer: Neil Jenkins (1,049)
- Top try scorer: Shane Williams (58)
- Home stadium: Principality Stadium
First colours	Second colours

World Rugby ranking
- Current: 10 (as of 29 June 2026)
- Highest: 1 (2019)
- Lowest: 14 (2025)

First international
- England 8–0 Wales (Blackheath, England; 19 February 1881)

Biggest win
- Wales 98–0 Japan (Cardiff, Wales; 26 November 2004)

Biggest defeat
- South Africa 96–13 Wales (Pretoria, South Africa; 27 June 1998)

World Cup
- Appearances: 10 (first in 1987)
- Best result: Third place (1987)
- Website: www.wru.wales

The Wales national rugby union team represents Wales in men's international rugby union. Its governing body, the Welsh Rugby Union (WRU), was established in 1881, the same year that Wales played their first international against England. The team plays its home matches at the Millennium Stadium in Cardiff, which replaced Cardiff Arms Park as the national stadium of Wales in 1999.

Wales has competed annually in the Six Nations Championship (previously the Home Nations Championship and Five Nations Championship) since it was established in 1883. They have won the tournament (and its predecessors) outright 28 times, most recently in 2021. Since the Six Nations was formed in 2000, Wales have won six Six Nations titles, including four Grand Slams, and finished bottom four times. Wales has also participated in every Rugby World Cup since the competition was established in 1987; they finished third in the inaugural tournament and have since made two semi-finals, in 2011 and 2019. Wales were the host nation for the 1999 Rugby World Cup, although matches were also played in England, Scotland, Ireland and France.

The Wales team experienced their first 'golden age' between 1900 and 1911; they first played New Zealand in 1905, winning 3–0 in a famous match at Cardiff Arms Park, and between March 1907 and January 1910, they won 11 consecutive matches, a record that stood for over a century. Welsh rugby struggled between the two World Wars, but experienced a second 'golden age' between 1969 and 1980, when they won eight Five Nations Championships. In addition to their Six Nations successes, Wales also finished fourth at both the 2011 Rugby World Cup and 2019 Rugby World Cup. Additionally Wales won 14 consecutive matches between March 2018 and March 2019, and reached number 1 in the World Rugby Rankings for the first time in August 2019. Eight former Welsh players have been inducted into the World Rugby Hall of Fame; 10 were inducted into the International Rugby Hall of Fame prior to its 2014 merger into the World Rugby Hall of Fame.

== History ==
=== Early years (1881–1892) ===
The Wales team jersey worn by Horace Sampson Lyne between 1883 and 1885

Rugby union took root in Wales in 1850, when Reverend Rowland Williams became Vice-Principal at St David's College, Lampeter, and introduced the sport there. Wales played their first international match on 19 February 1881; organised by Newport's Richard Mullock and captained by James Bevan, they played against England, losing by seven goals, one drop goal and six tries to nil. On 12 March 1881, the Welsh Rugby Union was formed at The Castle Hotel, Neath. Two years later, the Home Nations Championship – now the Six Nations Championship – was first played, but Wales did not register a win. However, rugby in Wales developed and, by the 1890s, the Welsh had introduced the "four three-quarters" formation – with seven backs and eight forwards instead of six backs and nine forwards – which revolutionised the sport and was eventually adopted almost universally at international and club level.

=== First 'golden age' (1893–1913) ===
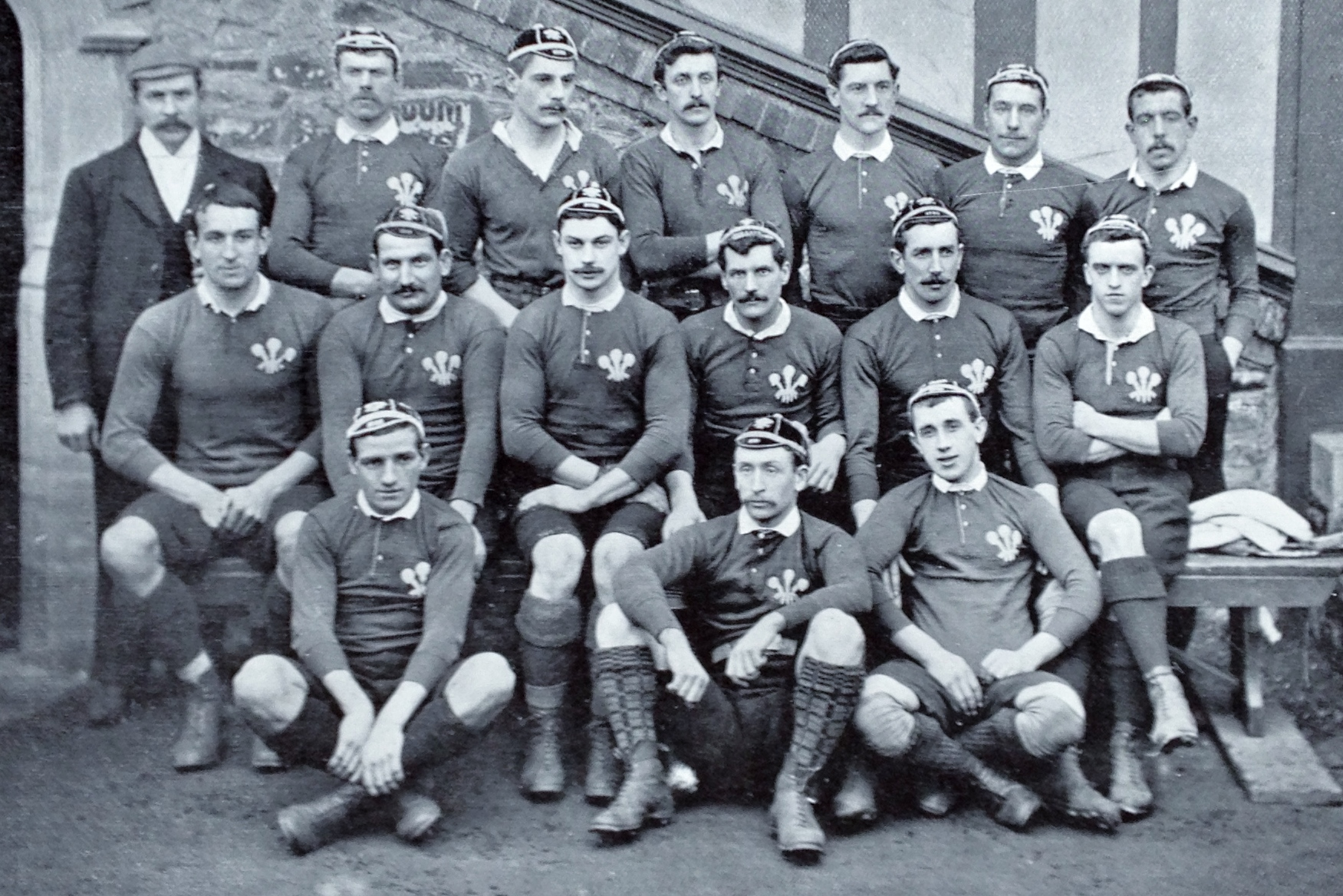
The 1895 Wales team before playing England in the Home Nations Championship

With the "four three-quarters" formation, Wales won the Home Nations Championship for the first time in 1893, winning the Triple Crown in the process. Wales next won the Championship in 1900, heralding the first "golden age" of Welsh rugby, which was to last until 1911. They won two more Triple Crowns in 1902 and 1905, and were runners-up in 1901, 1903 and 1904.

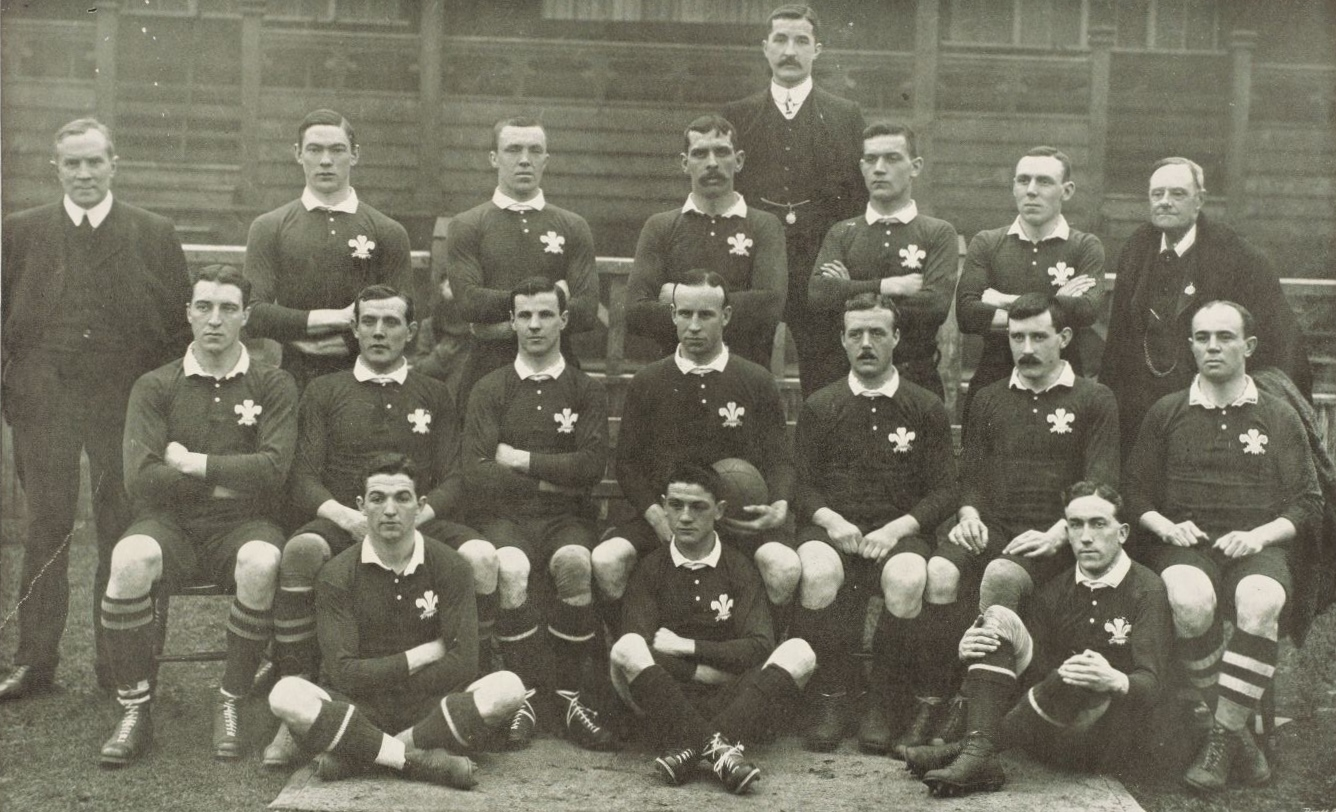
Wales' 1905 team that defeated New Zealand

In 1906, Wales again won the Home Nations Championship, (Note: Shared with Ireland.) and later that year played South Africa for the first time. Wales were favourites to win the match, but South Africa dominated in the forwards and eventually won 11–0. Two years later, on 12 December 1908, Wales played the touring Australians, who they defeated 9–6.

In 1909, Wales won the Home Nations Championship and then, in 1910 – with the inclusion of France – the first Five Nations. In 1911, Wales took the first Five Nations Grand Slam, winning all their matches in the tournament. (Note: Wales also defeated France in 1908 and 1909, but because France did not join the Championship until 1910, those are not counted as Grand Slam years.) It would be nearly 40 years before they achieved a Grand Slam again. England's defeat of Wales at Cardiff in 1913 was Wales' first home loss to one of the Home Nations since 1899, and their first home loss to England since 1895. The Great War came in 1914 and rugby was suspended for the duration.

==== The Game of the Century ====
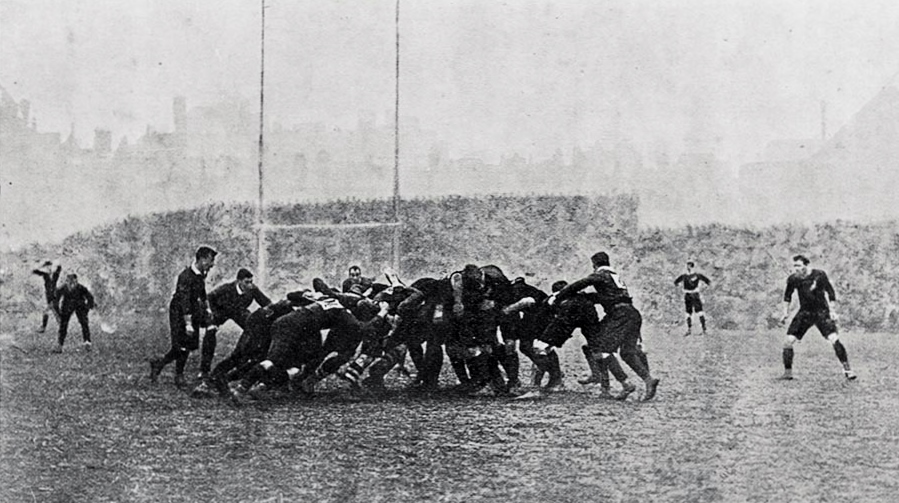
A scrum in the Wales victory over New Zealand's Original All Blacks in 1905

When Wales faced New Zealand at Cardiff Arms Park in late 1905, they had not lost at home since 1899. This New Zealand team – referred to as The Original All Blacks – was the first of the southern hemisphere national teams to visit the British Isles, and were undefeated on their tour up to that point, having already beaten England, Ireland and Scotland. (Note: Wales was the 28th match of New Zealand's tour, and at that point the tourists had scored 801 points and conceded only 22.)

Before the match, New Zealand team performed a haka (a Māori posture dance); the 47,000-strong crowd responded with the Welsh national anthem – Hen Wlad Fy Nhadau ("Land of My Fathers") – the first time a national anthem had been sung before a sporting fixture. Wales wing Teddy Morgan scored a try to give Wales a 3–0 lead, before New Zealand's Bob Deans claimed to have scored a try, only to be dragged behind the goal-line before the referee arrived. The referee awarded a scrum to Wales and the score remained unchanged; Wales won 3–0. The loss was New Zealand's only defeat on their 35-match tour.

=== Post-war years (1920–1968) ===
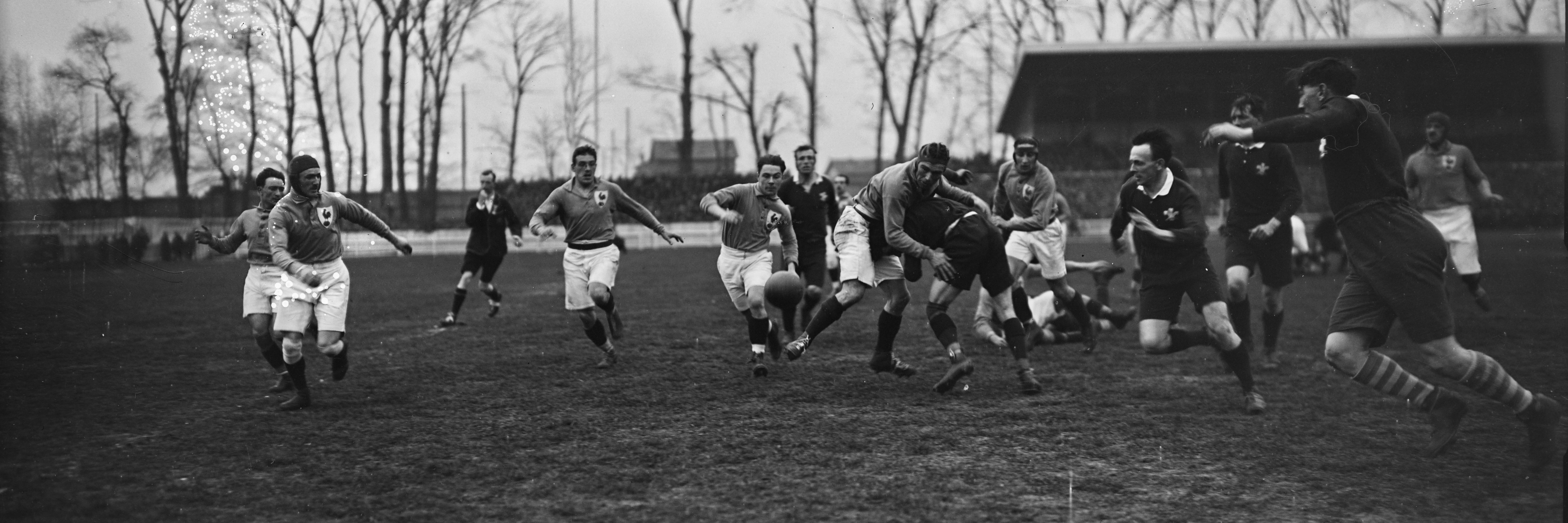
Wales playing France during the 1922 Five Nations Championship

The post-First World War years marked a decline in Welsh rugby. An industrial recession struck the country, and hurt South Wales in particular. Welsh international results in the 1920s mirrored the performance of the economy: of their 42 matches, they won only 17, with three drawn. Half a million people emigrated from Wales to find work elsewhere during the depression; this included many Welsh rugby union internationals, who moved to the professional code of rugby league. Between 1923 and 1928, Wales managed only seven victories – five of them against France. However, even France managed to defeat Wales that decade, achieving their first victory in 1928. Welsh selection policy reflected the upheavals of the mid-1920s. In 1924, 35 different players were selected for Wales' four matches, with a different captain for each, and only Edward Watkins in the backs and Charlie Pugh in the forwards playing in all four matches.

A resurgence of both economy and rugby union followed in the 1930s and, in 1931, Wales won their first championship for nine years. That year, for the first time since the First World War, Wales retained the same side for two consecutive matches when they faced England and Scotland. Then, in 1933, captained by Watcyn Thomas, Wales defeated England at Twickenham. In 1935, Wales beat the touring New Zealand side 13–12, with Haydn Tanner making his first appearance. Although the Five Nations Championship was suspended during the Second World War, (Note: Having been expelled in 1931, France was readmitted into international rugby union following the Home Nations Championship in 1939.) Wales did play a Red Cross charity match against England at Cardiff in 1940, losing 18–9.

After the Second World War, Wales played a New Zealand Army team (the Kiwis) in 1946, losing 11–3. The Five Nations (suspended during the war) resumed in 1947, when Wales shared the title with England. Although Wales suffered their first home defeat to France in 1948, they won their first Five Nations Grand Slam since 1911 in 1950. The next year, they lost 6–3 to the touring South Africans, despite dominating in the line-outs. They achieved another Grand Slam in 1952, followed by a 13–8 win over New Zealand in 1953. In 1954, St Helen's in Swansea (a Welsh international venue since 1882) hosted its last international and Cardiff Arms Park officially became the home of the Welsh team. In 1956, Wales again won the Five Nations, but they did not regain the title until 1964 and did not win it outright until 1965.

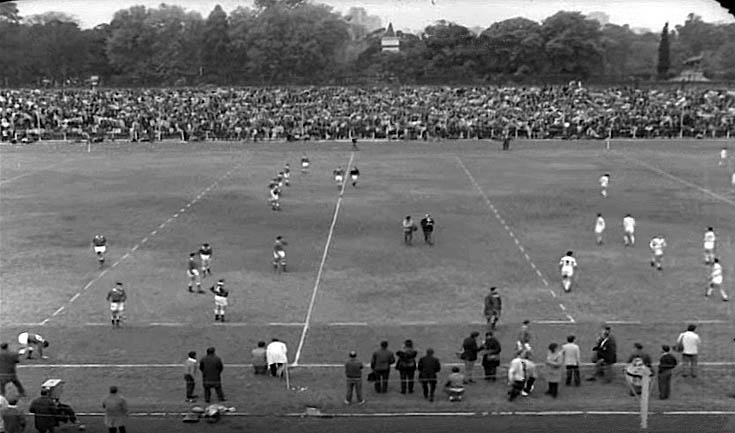
Wales playing Argentina at Estadio GEBA in September 1968

Wales conducted their first overseas tour in 1964, playing several games and one test in South Africa. They lost the test against South Africa in Durban 24–3, their biggest defeat in 40 years. At the WRU annual general meeting that year, the outgoing WRU President D. Ewart Davies declared that "it was evident from the experience of the South African Tour that a much more positive attitude to the game was required in Wales ... Players must be prepared to learn, and indeed re-learn, to the absolute point of mastery, the basic principles of Rugby Union football". This started the coaching revolution. The WRU Coaching Committee – set up in the late 1950s – was given the task of improving the quality of coaching and, in January 1967, Ray Williams was appointed Coaching Organiser. The first national coach, David Nash, was appointed in 1967 to coach Wales for the season, but resigned when the WRU refused to allow him to accompany Wales on their 1968 tour of Argentina. Eventually, the WRU reversed their decision, appointing Clive Rowlands to tour as coach. Of the six matches, Wales won three, drew two and lost one.

=== Second 'golden age' (1969–1979) ===
Wales enjoyed a second "golden age" in the 1970s, with world-class players such as Gareth Edwards, J. P. R. Williams, Gerald Davies, Barry John, and Mervyn Davies in their side. Wales dominated Northern Hemisphere rugby between 1969 and 1979, and managed an incredible winning record, losing only seven times during that period. Wales toured New Zealand for the first time in 1969, but were defeated in both matches. In the second test, which they lost 33–12, New Zealand fullback Fergie McCormick scored 24 points; a record at the time.

In 1970, Wales shared the Five Nations with France, and recorded a 6–6 draw against South Africa in Cardiff. The following year, Wales recorded their first Five Nations Grand Slam since 1952. Using only 16 players in four games, the 1971 side achieved their most notable win of the tournament in their victory over Scotland; after a last-minute try by Gerald Davies that reduced Scotland's lead to 18–17, flanker John Taylor kicked a conversion from the sideline described as "the greatest conversion since St Paul" to give Wales a 19–18 win. Wales contributed more players than any other team to the British Lions side that toured New Zealand that year. Those Lions became the only ones to win a series over New Zealand.

In the 1972 Five Nations Championship, Wales and Scotland refused to travel to Ireland at the height of the Troubles after receiving threats, purportedly from the Irish Republican Army. The Championship remained unresolved with Wales and Ireland unbeaten. Although the Five Nations was a five-way tie in 1973, the Welsh did defeat Australia 24–0 in Cardiff.

Wales next won the Five Nations outright in 1975, and in 1976, Wales won their second Grand Slam of the decade. Just like the first in 1971, they used only 16 players over their four matches. They repeated the feat in 1978 and, in the process, became the first team to win three consecutive Triple Crowns. Following their final Five Nations match of 1978, both Phil Bennett and Gareth Edwards retired from rugby.

Wales hosted New Zealand at Cardiff Arms Park in November 1978, losing 13–12 after a late penalty goal by the replacement New Zealand fullback, Brian McKechnie. The penalty was controversial because New Zealand lock Andy Haden had dived out of a line-out in an attempt to earn a penalty. Haden later admitted that he and Frank Oliver had pre-agreed this tactic should they find themselves in difficulties. Referee Roger Quittenton was criticised by the press for failing to notice the dive, but he later stated that the penalty had been given against Welsh lock Geoff Wheel for jumping off the shoulder of Oliver. Quittenton later said, "Haden's perception is that his dive secured the penalty. That is a load of rubbish". Wales then went on to win the 1979 Five Nations with a Triple Crown.

=== Barren years (1980–2003) ===
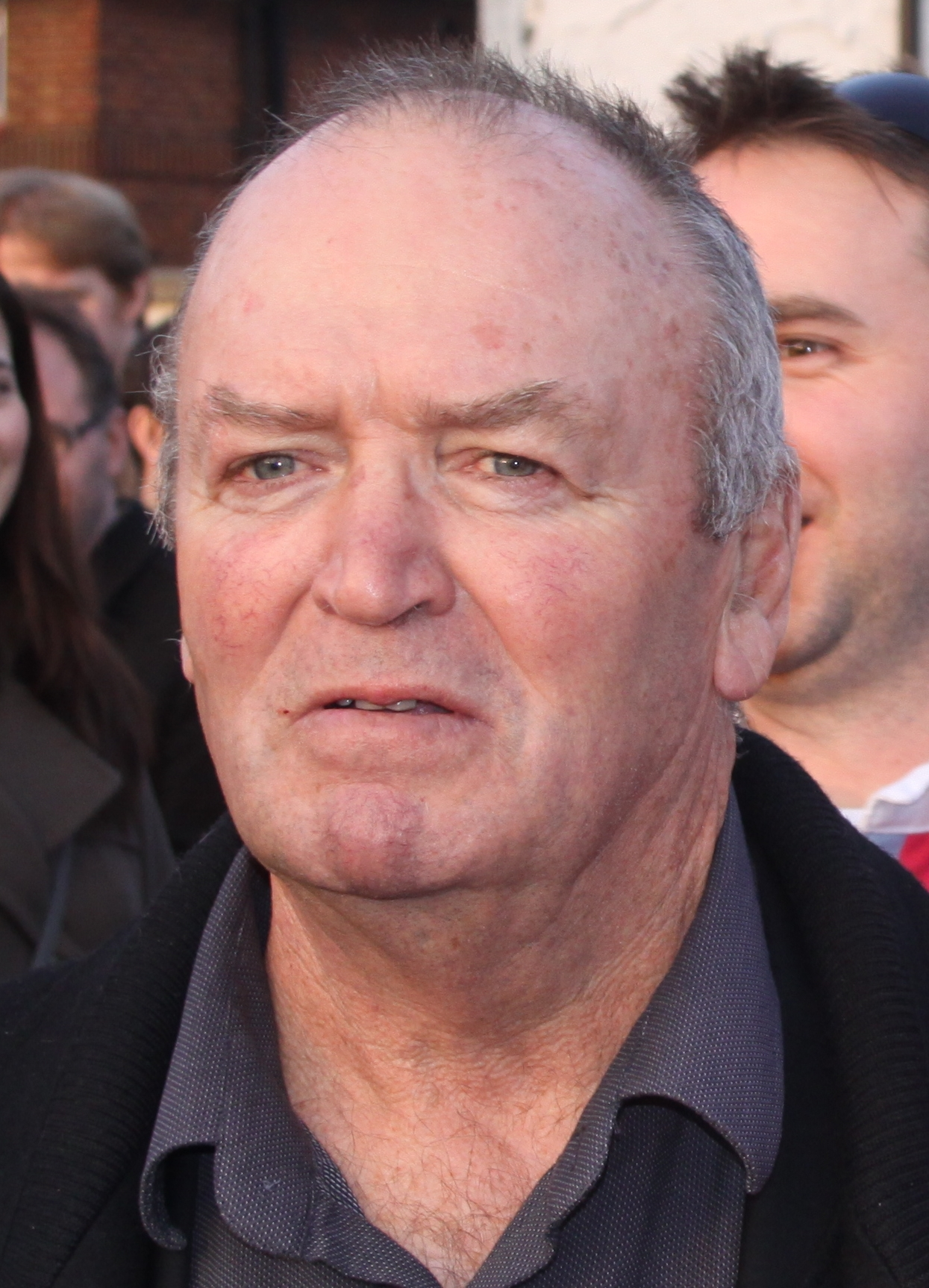
New Zealander Graham Henry coached Wales to their first test win over South Africa in 1999.

In 1980, the WRU's centenary year, Wales lost 23–3 to New Zealand in Cardiff, with the All Blacks scoring four tries to nil. Wales won two matches in the Five Nations Championships of both 1980 and 1981, and in 1983 were nearly upset by Japan, winning 29–24 at Cardiff. In 1984, Australia defeated Wales 28–9 at Cardiff Arms Park.

Wales achieved only one win in 1987's Five Nations before contesting the inaugural Rugby World Cup. Wales defeated Ireland in their crucial pool fixture, before defeating England in the quarter-finals. They then faced hosts New Zealand, who won 49–6, but beat Australia in the third place play-off game to claim third. The next year Wales won the Triple Crown for the first time since 1979, but heavy defeats on tour to New Zealand later that year saw the end of a number of Welsh players' careers, as several converted to rugby league.

Welsh rugby reached a nadir when Wales suffered their first Five Nations Championship whitewash; they had upset England in 1989 to avoid losing all their Championship matches that season, but in 1990, Wales were defeated in all four Five Nations' matches for the first time, before almost doing the same the following year. The 1991 World Cup saw further frustration, when Wales were upset by Samoa in their opening match. A second group-stage loss, by 38–3 to Australia, eliminated Wales from the tournament.

After winning two Five Nations games in 1992, and one in 1993, Wales won the Championship in 1994 on points difference. But without defeating one of Australia, New Zealand or South Africa during the inter-World Cup period, and again losing all four of their matches at the 1995 Five Nations Championship, Wales was not considered a major contender for the 1995 Rugby World Cup. At the 1995 World Cup, after comprehensively beating Japan, Wales lost to New Zealand; this meant that they needed to defeat Ireland to qualify for the quarter-finals. Wales lost 24–23 and so failed to progress beyond the pool stage for the second time, and later that year Kevin Bowring replaced Alec Evans to become Wales' first full-time coach.

Record defeats of 51–0 to France and 96–13 to South Africa, prompted the WRU to appoint New Zealander Graham Henry as coach in 1998. Henry had early success as coach, leading Wales to a 10-match winning streak; this included Wales' first victory over South Africa, a 29–19 win in the first match played at the Millennium Stadium. Henry was consequently nicknamed "the Great Redeemer" by the Welsh media and fans, a reference to the opening line of Cwm Rhondda, a popular song among Welsh rugby fans. Hosting the 1999 World Cup, Wales qualified for the quarter-finals for the first time since 1987, but lost 24–9 to eventual champions Australia. A lack of success in the Five and Six Nations (Italy joined the tournament in 2000), and especially a number of heavy losses to Ireland, led to Henry's resignation in February 2002; his assistant Steve Hansen took over.

During Hansen's tenure, the WRU implemented a significant change in the structure of the game domestically. Regional teams were introduced as a tier above the traditional club-based structures in 2003, and the five (later four) regional sides became the top level of domestic professional rugby in the country. (Note: For more information see Introduction of regional rugby union teams in Wales.) At the 2003 World Cup, Wales scored four tries in their 53–37 pool stage loss to New Zealand, before losing in the quarter-finals to the eventual tournament winners, England, despite outscoring them by three tries to one.

=== Revival under Ruddock and coaching changes (2004–2007) ===
Coached by Mike Ruddock, Wales won their first Grand Slam since 1978 and their first Six Nations Grand Slam in 2005. A late long-range penalty from Gavin Henson gave them victory over England in Cardiff for the first time in 12 years, and after victories over Italy, France and Scotland, they faced Ireland in front of a capacity crowd at the Millennium Stadium where Wales' 32–20 victory gave them their first Championship since 1994. Later that year, they suffered a record home loss, 41–3 to New Zealand.

Ruddock resigned as head coach midway through the 2006 Six Nations, where Wales finished fifth, and Gareth Jenkins was eventually appointed as his replacement. Jenkins led Wales through the 2007 World Cup, where they failed to advance beyond the pool stage after losing their final game 38–34 to Fiji, thanks to a Graham Dewes try. Jenkins subsequently lost his job, and Warren Gatland, a New Zealander, was appointed as his successor.

=== First Gatland Era (2008–2019) ===
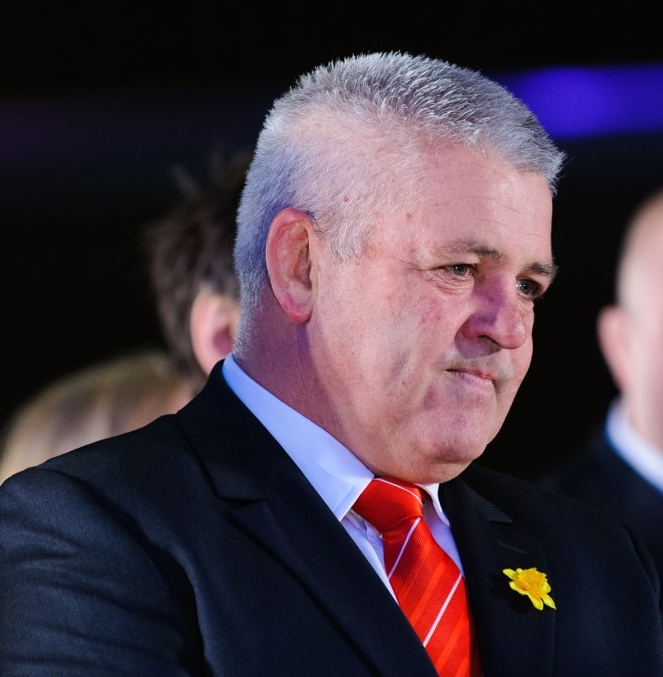
Warren Gatland coached the team 2008–2019

Wales faced England at Twickenham for Gatland's inaugural match as coach and their first match of the 2008 Six Nations. They had not defeated England there since 1988, and went on to win 26–19. They won all their matches in the Championship, conceding only two tries in the process, to claim another Grand Slam. Later that year, Wales defeated Australia 21–18 in Cardiff, but then started a six-year, 23-game winless streak against the southern hemisphere nations of Australia, New Zealand and South Africa.

At the 2011 World Cup, Wales reached the semi-finals for the first time since 1987, but lost 9–8 to France after captain Sam Warburton was sent off. The two teams met again in March 2012, with Wales needing a win to claim their third Six Nations Grand Slam in eight years, which they did with a 16–9 victory. This was followed immediately by an eight-match losing streak that was eventually broken during the 2013 Six Nations, where Wales retained the Championship for the first time since 1979. Wales reached the quarter-finals of the 2015 World Cup at the expense of hosts England, before losing 23–19 to South Africa. Wales also achieved a fourth Grand Slam in 14 years and their first in seven years in the 2019 Six Nations.

Wales reached the top spot in the men's World Rugby Rankings in August 2019, holding the position for two weeks. They went on to top their pool at the 2019 Rugby World Cup, winning all their pool matches for the first time since the inaugural tournament in 1987, and ultimately reached the semi-finals before they were knocked out by eventual champions South Africa; Wales lost to New Zealand in the bronze final and finished fourth in the tournament.

=== Pivac Era (2019–2022) ===
In July 2018, it was announced that then-Scarlets coach Wayne Pivac would succeed Gatland as Wales coach following the 2019 Rugby World Cup. Pivac's first match in charge was a match against a Barbarians side coach by Gatland in November 2019. Despite winning Pivac's first full international in charge in the 2020 Six Nations against Italy, Wales only recorded two other wins all year, finishing fifth in both the Six Nations and the Autumn Nations Cup. 2021 saw highs and lows. Wales won their fourth Six Nations title of the last decade, though they fell short of winning the Grand Slam at the death of their final match against France in Paris. They faced Argentina in a two-match test series, in which they drew the opening game and Wales lost in the second game 33–11. That autumn, Wales opened with losses to New Zealand and South Africa before beating Fiji and Australia.

Wales slumped to a fifth-place finish in the 2022 Six Nations Championship, their sole win coming at home against Scotland. In the final week of the tournament, Wales lost to Italy 22–21, their first ever home loss to the Italians.

They then embarked on a tour to South Africa over the summer. Wales narrowly lost the first test, losing 32–29 after a late penalty from Springbok outside half Handre Pollard. The following week, Wales secured their first ever win on South African soil, winning 13–12 in Bloemfontein. South Africa won the final test, and secured a 2–1 series win.

=== Second Gatland spell and record losing run (2022–2025) ===
On 5 December 2022, Warren Gatland was reappointed as head coach, following a review of Wayne Pivac and his performance in the 2022 Autumn Nations Series. The contract saw Gatland appointed as head coach through to the end of the 2023 Rugby World Cup, with the potential to extend for an additional four years, through the 2027 Men's Rugby World Cup. Gatland's initial coaching team included Alex King as attack coach, Mike Forshaw as defence coach, Jonathan Humphreys as forwards coach and Neil Jenkins as skills coach. Jonathan Thomas was added as a contact area skills coach.

They finished fifth in the 2023 Six Nations, only beating Italy, but saw a slight improvement at the 2023 Rugby World Cup, topping their pool unbeaten and recording their largest ever victory over Australia. Argentina knocked them out in the quarter-finals, scoring two late tries to win 29–17. However, Wales were whitewashed in the 2024 Six Nations, losing to Italy at home again.

In November 2024, they lost 24–19 to Fiji in the Autumn Nations Series. This was their tenth loss in a row, equalling a record set by head coach Steve Hansen from 2002 to 2003. It was also the first time Wales had ever lost to Fiji at the Millenium Stadium. A week later, they lost 52–20 to Australia at the Millennium Stadium, a record 11th straight consecutive defeat.,

Throughout the 2025 Six Nations, they fell to 12th in the world rankings, below Six Nations hopefuls Georgia, following a second defeat by Italy in consecutive years and a first loss in Rome since the 2007 tournament. This was also their record 14th successive defeat in all competitions and an 8th consecutive defeat in Six Nations fixtures. Following this result, Warren Gatland's departure as head coach was confirmed on 11 February 2025. He was replaced on an interim basis by Cardiff Rugby head coach Matt Sherratt, who would take charge of the side for the remainder for the 2025 Six Nations. At home on Matchday 3, Wales took their first lead of the Tournament at half-time against Ireland. Despite this revival, Wales ended up losing their fifteenth match in a row 18–27. On 8 March, on Matchday 4, Scotland pushed the Welsh further down the rankings despite a late comeback where Wales scored four tries in a 35–29 defeat. Wales then ended the tournament with a home defeat by England, suffering their heaviest-ever defeat in the tournament and their heaviest-ever home defeat by their arch-rivals, 14–68. This setback, the 17th in a row in all competitions, the longest losing streak by a Six Nations team in the modern era, confirmed a second straight wooden spoon for Wales.

Sherratt chose to stay on for the Summer tour to Japan adding Harlequins head coach Danny Wilson for this period. Although, this tour occurred during the 2025 Lions tour to Australia, only two Welsh players, Jac Morgan and Tomos Williams, were selected, enabling Wales to bring a full strength side. The Lions opening test match against Australia was the first Lions Test without Welsh representation since the 1890s, reflective of Wales' continued demise at test level. Wales tied the record for consecutive matches without a victory by a tier I nation at 18 with a 24–19 defeat away by Japan in the first summer international; this defeat also put Wales at an all-time low of 14th in the world rankings on 7 July 2025. The following week, after 644 days without a victory, Wales ended their losing streak after a 22–31 victory against Japan.

=== Tandy era (2025–present) ===
In July 2025, Scotland defence coach Steve Tandy was appointed as the new permanent head coach. In doing so, he became the first Welsh-born head coach of the national team since Gareth Jenkins was sacked from the position in 2007.

In March 2026, in the final round of the 2026 Six Nations, Wales beat Italy 31–17 to win their first Six Nations fixture since 2023. Despite this, they finished the tournament with their third consecutive wooden spoon.

In November 2026, as part of the inaugural Nations Championship series, Wales beat New Zealand for the first time since 1953. During the match, Dafydd Jenkins equalled the record held by Thierry Dusautoir, for most tackles in an international fixture with 38. Collectively, the team also set a new record for the most tackles in an international fixture with 346, surpassing the previous record of 252.

== Strip ==
Wales typically play in Red Jerseys. The Emblem on the Jersey is the Prince of Wales's feathers which has been used since the very first Wales match in 1881.

For the 2025-26 Season Wales' Home strip is composed of a red jersey, divided into light & dark quarters (similar to the 2019-20 jersey) & is paired with red shorts & white socks. The alternate jersey is white & features a blue pattern mimicking a topographic map (a motif used in the 2017-19 strip) & is paired black shorts & socks.

The jerseys are embroidered with the WRU logo, which is based on the Prince of Wales's feathers. The first Welsh rugby jersey worn in 1881 featured the Prince of Wales feathers in the centre of the jersey, before moving to the left in 1885, where it has remained since. In 1992 WRU logo replaced the traditional Prince of Wales Feathers resulting in the Motto Ich dien (meaning "I serve" in German), being replaced with the WRU letters. Part of the reason for the switch was so the WRU could copyrighting the logo.

Traditionally the Red home Jersey has been paired with white shorts (or some times, black) shorts and red socks. For the 2015–16 season, the jersey design incorporated gold for the first time.

Over the years alternate kits have been a range of colours including black, grey, green, white & Yellow. Since 2024 the alternate jersey has been white to comply with World Rugby's kit rules around colour blindness introduced in 2025.

Wales previously wore black jerseys as part of celebrations for the WRU's 125th anniversary in 2005. The jersey was worn against Fiji and then Australia that year; the Australia match was the first time Wales had not played in their red jersey against one of their traditional rivals.

=== Sponsorship ===
In 1992, the Welsh Rugby Union agreed a deal with Cotton Traders to produce the national team's kits. They were replaced in 1996 by Reebok, whose contract with the Welsh Rugby Union was worth £1.3 million in 1999. Wales received the first jersey sponsor in their history in 2000, when Redstone Telecoms agreed a deal worth £2 million. Redstone was replaced two years later by Reebok subsidiary Rockport, in a deal worth £1 million, followed by Brains Brewery in 2004, in conjunction with a four-year extension to the Reebok deal. Due to French alcohol advertising regulations, the "Brains" name was replaced by "Brawn" for the 2005 Six Nations Championship match between France and Wales at the Stade de France, and by "Brawn Again" for the corresponding match two years later. The Brains deal was extended in June 2008 until September 2009, with "Brains SA" appearing on Wales home shirts and "SA Gold" appearing on the team's yellow change shirts. For the away match against France in February 2009, the "Brains SA" logo was replaced by the words "Try Essai"; "essai" is the French word for a try, but is also pronounced the same as "SA", meaning the branding could have been viewed as "an invitation to 'try' Wales' best loved beer brand".

In 2008, Under Armour replaced Reebok as Wales' kit manufacturer in a four-year deal worth £10 million. Welsh insurance company Admiral replaced Brains as the main shirt sponsors in 2010, signing a three-year contract. That deal was extended by two years in both in 2013 and 2015, with the latter described as the WRU's "biggest shirt partnership deal in its history". In 2017, Japanese motor company Isuzu replaced Admiral as the main sponsors of the Wales team's home shirts. Between 2017 & 2019 the sponsorship of the team's alternate shirt was taken on by Subaru as a result of both Subaru & Isuzu's UK imports being handled by IM Group. In October 2015, the WRU agreed a nine-year, £33 million extension to its contract with Under Armour, only for both parties to mutually terminate the deal four years early in 2020.

A new, seven-year contract with Italian company Macron was agreed in September 2020, believed to be worth around £30 million. In 2021 Cazoo replaced Isuzu as the shirt sponsor in a two-year deal, however Isuzu remained a partner of the WRU. In June 2023, Vodafone replaced Cazoo as the front of shirt sponsor (although it had already been present on the women's team's shirts since 2022), A month later, it was announced that comparison site Go.Compare would become the first back-of-shirt sponsor of the team. The new Macron kits were launched toward the end of July (Just after the 2023 World cup shirts) at which point it was also announced that player names would return to the back of the shirts, having previously been present between 2005 & 2008.

Period	Kit manufacturer	Front of shirt sponsor	Back of shirt Sponsor
1970s–1991	Umbro	No shirt sponsor	N/A
1991–1996	Cotton Traders	No shirt sponsor	N/A
1997–2000	Reebok	No shirt sponsor	N/A
2000–2002	Reebok	Redstone Telecom	N/A
2002–2004	Reebok	Rockport	N/A
2004–2008	Reebok	Brains Brewery	N/A
2008–2010	Under Armour	Brains Brewery	N/A
2010–2017	Under Armour	Admiral	N/A
2017–2019	Under Armour	Isuzu (home kit); Subaru (alternate kit)	N/A
2019-2020	Under Armour	Isuzu	N/A
2020–	Macron	Isuzu	N/A
2021–2023	Macron	Cazoo	N/A
2023–	Macron	Vodafone	Go.Compare

== Support ==
Rugby union and Wales' national team hold an important place in Welsh culture and society. Sport historian John Bale has stated that "rugby is characteristically Welsh", and David Andrew said that "To the popular consciousness, rugby is as Welsh as coal mining, male voice choirs, How Green Was My Valley, Dylan Thomas, and Tom Jones". Welsh rugby's first 'golden age' (1900–1911) coincided with the country's zenith during the 20th century, and rugby was important in building Wales' modern identity. There is a long tradition of Welsh supporters singing before and during matches. The choral tradition developed in Wales during the 19th century alongside the rise of nonconformity, and has extended to singing at rugby matches. Commonly sung songs include the hymn Cwm Rhondda, Tom Jones' Delilah, and Max Boyce's Hymns and Arias.

== Home stadium ==
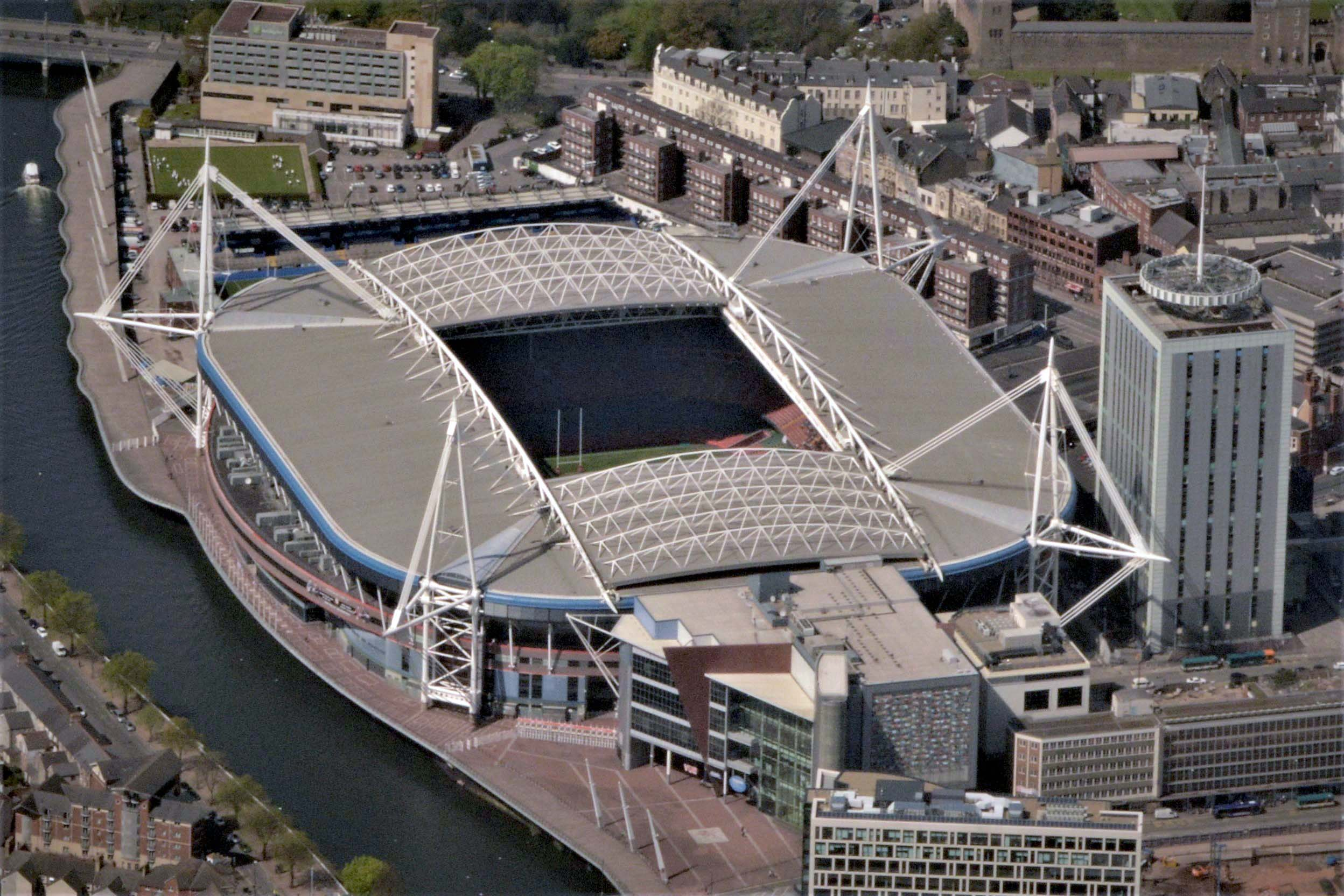
Millennium Stadium, Cardiff, where Wales play their home games

Wales' first home international was played in 1882 at St Helen's Ground in Swansea. In the 1880s and 1890s, home Welsh internationals were played at Cardiff, Swansea, Newport and Llanelli. Swansea continued to be used as an international venue until 1954, when Cardiff Arms Park became Wales' primary home venue. Cardiff Arms Park first had a stand erected in 1881, and continued to expand its seating that decade. Crowds continued to grow and in 1902 in Wales' match against Scotland a world record 40,000 spectators paid to see the match. In 1911, the owners of the Arms Park, the Marquess of Bute's family, confirmed Wales' tenure and during the 1920s and 1930s, Wales gradually gained increasing control. A new stand was built at the park in the 1933–34 season, which increased the grounds' capacity to 56,000.

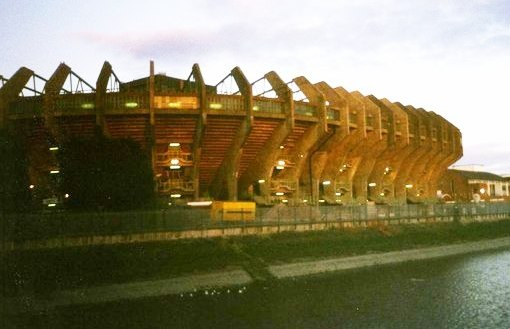
National Stadium, Cardiff, the Welsh national stadium prior to the construction of the Millennium Stadium

By 1958, the WRU had concluded that a new national ground was needed due to flooding that often affected Arms Park. After debate and disputes between the WRU and various other parties, including Cardiff RFC, it was decided in the 1960s that a new national stadium would be built with a new ground for the Cardiff club backing onto it. The National Stadium, as it was known, was officially opened in 1970.

Since 1999, Wales have played all their home matches at the 73,931-capacity Millennium Stadium (currently known as the Principality Stadium for sponsorship seasons), Cardiff, which is also Wales' national stadium. The Millennium Stadium was first conceived in 1994, when a group redevelopment committee was set up. It was decided to replace the National Stadium at Cardiff Arms Park after a review found it was out of date; new legislation also required stadia to be all-seated. Construction of the new stadium began in September 1997, and was completed by June 1999, in time for the Rugby World Cup. The construction, which cost the WRU £126 million, was funded by private investment, £46 million of public funds from the [[National Lottery (United Kingdom)|National Lottery]], the sale of debentures to supporters (offering guaranteed tickets in exchange for an interest-free loan), and loans. While the new ground was being built, Wales used the old Wembley Stadium for their home matches – a deal reciprocated during construction of the new Wembley, when FA Cup finals were held at the Millennium Stadium.

In the Autumn of 2020, Wales played home matches at the Parc y Scarlets due to the Millennium Stadium being used as the Dragon's Heart Hospital - a temporary hospital setup during the COVID-19 pandemic.

== Record ==
=== Six Nations ===
Wales compete annually in the Six Nations Championship, which is played against five other European nations: England, France, Ireland, Italy, and Scotland. The Six Nations started as the Home Nations Championship in 1883, as a contest between the four component nations of the United Kingdom. Wales first won it in 1893, when they achieved a Triple Crown. Wales have won the tournament outright 28 times, and shared 12 other victories. Their longest wait between championships was 11 years (1994–2005). Wales first won a Grand Slam in 1908 – although France did not officially join the Five Nations until 1910 – and their first Six Nations Grand Slam in 2005. Their most recent Grand Slam was won in 2019 with victory over Ireland on the final day of the Six Nations tournament. Their most recent Triple Crown was won in 2021 with victory over England in the third round of the Six Nations tournament. In 2024 Wales received the wooden spoon for the first time in 21 years and replicated this with a second successive wooden spoon the following year.

=== World Cup ===
Wales have contested every Rugby World Cup since the inaugural tournament in 1987.

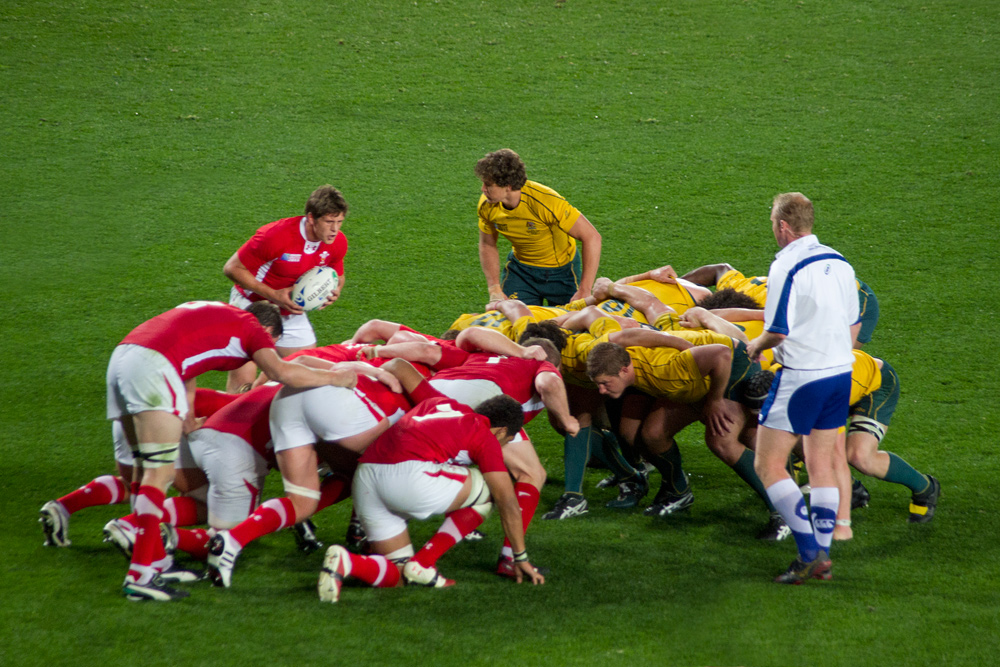
A scrum between Wales and Australia at the 2011 Rugby World Cup

The 1987 tournament was Wales' most successful; they won all three pool matches and their quarter-final, before losing to the All Blacks in the semi-finals. They then faced Australia in the third place play-off match, which they won 22–21.

In the next two tournaments in 1991 and 1995, Wales failed to progress beyond the pool stage, winning just one match in each tournament. They also became the first co host nation to not make it out of the pool stage in 1991.

Both the 1999 and 2003 tournaments were more successful, with Wales qualifying for the quarter-finals both times. Wales hosted the event in 1999 and topped their pool only to lose to eventual winners Australia in the quarter-finals.

In 2003, they finished second in their pool behind the All Blacks, and faced England in the quarter-finals. They lost to England, the eventual champions, 28–17. Wales conceded 17 penalties, and their lack of discipline proved costly.

In the 2007 World Cup, Wales again failed to progress from the pool stage. After a loss to Australia, and two wins against Japan and Canada, they faced Fiji for a place in the quarter-finals. The game started poorly for Wales who were behind 25–3 at half-time. They fought back to lead by three points with six minutes remaining, but Fiji then scored a try to win 38–34 and eliminated Wales from the tournament.

At the 2011 World Cup, Wales reached the semi-finals for the first time since 1987. Playing the semi-finals against France, Wales lost 9–8, in a game overshadowed by the 18th-minute sending off of Wales' captain Sam Warburton for a dangerous tackle against Vincent Clerc.

At the 2015 World Cup Wales were in the same pool as Australia, England, Fiji and Uruguay. They finished second in the pool behind Australia and ahead of hosts England. South Africa defeated Wales in the quarter-finals.

In the 2019 World Cup Wales were in pool D with Australia, Fiji, Georgia and Uruguay. They won all their group matches to finish top of the pool. After defeating France in the quarter-finals, they lost to the eventual tournament winners South Africa in the semi-finals.

In the 2023 World Cup Wales were in pool C with Australia, Fiji, Georgia and Portugal. They won all their group matches to finish top of the pool. Argentina defeated Wales in the quarter finals.

Rugby World Cup record									Qualification						
Year	Round	Pld	W	D	L	PF	PA	Squad	Pos	Pld	W	D	L	PF	PA
(New Zealand) (Australia) 1987	Third place	6	5	0	1	126	104	Squad	Invited						
(England) (France) (Ireland) (Scotland) (Wales) 1991	Pool stage	3	1	0	2	32	61	Squad	Automatically qualified						
(South Africa) 1995	Pool stage	3	1	0	2	89	68	Squad	1st	4	4	0	0	156	11
(Wales) 1999	Quarter-finals	4	2	0	2	127	95	Squad	Automatically qualified						
(Australia) 2003	Quarter-finals	5	3	0	2	149	126	Squad	Automatically qualified						
(France) 2007	Pool stage	4	2	0	2	168	105	Squad	Automatically qualified						
(New Zealand) 2011	Fourth place	7	4	0	3	228	74	Squad	Automatically qualified						
(England) 2015	Quarter-finals	5	3	0	2	130	85	Squad	Automatically qualified						
(Japan) 2019	Fourth place	7	5	0	2	189	147	Squad	Automatically qualified						
(France) 2023	Quarter-finals	5	4	0	1	160	88	Squad	Automatically qualified						
(Australia) 2027	Qualified								Automatically qualified						
(United States) 2031	To be determined								To be determined						
Total	—	49	30	0	19	1398	953	—	—	4	4	0	0	156	11
Champions; Runners–up; Third place; Fourth place; Home venue

=== Overall ===
Men's World Rugby Rankings Top 20 as of 16 November 2026
Rank	Change (Note: Change from the previous week)	Team	Points
1	Steady	South Africa	91.53
2	Steady	New Zealand	90.65
3	▲1	France	89.05
4	▼1	Ireland	88.70
5	Steady	England	86.99
6	Steady	Scotland	85.28
7	Steady	Australia	82.24
8	Steady	Argentina	82.09
9	▲1	Wales	79.37
10	▼1	Fiji	77.79
11	Steady	Italy	75.84
12	Steady	Japan	75.25
13	Steady	Georgia	74.23
14	▲1	United States	68.39
15	▼1	Portugal	68.24
16	▲3	Samoa	67.60
17	▲1	Chile	67.00
18	▼2	Spain	66.53
19	▼2	Tonga	65.58
20	Steady	Uruguay	65.17

Wales's historical rankings

Source: World Rugby
Graph updated to 16 November 2026

When the World Rugby Rankings were introduced in October 2003, Wales were ranked 8th. (Note: Ranking archives can be found at the World Rugby website.) They rose to 7th in June 2004, before falling back to 8th in November that year. Following a Grand Slam win in the 2005 Six Nations, they rose to a ranking position of 5th. They fell to 9th by June 2006, and, after rising back to 8th by September, fell to 10th after the 2007 World Cup. A second Six Nations' Grand Slam in 2008 propelled them to 6th in the rankings, but following losses to South Africa in the mid-year and end-of-year internationals Wales slipped to 7th. Wales climbed to 4th after a win over Scotland in their first match of the 2009 Six Nations. They slumped to 9th in 2010 but rose back to 4th after their fourth place in the 2011 World Cup. Since then, Wales have ranked the majority of the time among the top six teams. They reached 2nd during the 2015 Rugby World Cup, before hitting top spot for the first time on 19 August 2019, after winning 15 of their last 17 games.

Wales have won 411 of their 815 Test matches. Their biggest Test defeat was a 96–13 loss to South Africa in 1998, and their largest victory was a 98–0 defeat of Japan in 2004. Their record for most tries in a match is 16, scored against Portugal in 1994 – they also scored 102 points in this match, more than in any other Test. Wales' record for consecutive Test wins is 14, and for consecutive losses is 18. During this losing streak Wales suffered their third worst defeat in history, losing 14–68 to England.

Below is table of the representative rugby matches played by a Wales national XV at test level up until 15 November 2026.

Opponent	Played	Won	Lost	Drawn	Win %	PF	PA	+/−
Argentina	24	14	9	1	58%	623	574	+49
Australia	49	14	34	1	29%	830	1,190	−360
Barbarians	11	5	6	0	45%	339	311	+28
Canada	13	12	1	0	92%	528	219	+309
England	144	61	71	12	42%	1,804	2,042	−238
Fiji	16	13	2	1	81%	486	259	+227
France	106	51	52	3	48%	1,634	1,716	–82
Georgia	5	4	1	0	80%	129	52	+77
Ireland	137	70	60	7	51%	1,681	1,695	–14
Italy	35	29	5	1	83%	1,157	563	+594
Japan	14	12	2	0	86%	628	249	+379
Namibia	4	4	0	0	100%	171	69	+102
New Zealand	39	4	35	0	10%	491	1,299	−808
New Zealand Natives	1	1	0	0	100%	1G	0G	+1G
New Zealand Services	1	0	1	0	0%	3	6	−3
Pacific Islanders	1	1	0	0	100%	38	20	+18
Portugal	2	2	0	0	100%	130	19	+111
Romania	8	6	2	0	75%	342	96	+246
Samoa	10	6	4	0	60%	235	180	+55
Scotland	132	75	54	3	57%	1,863	1,496	+367
South Africa	45	7	37	1	16%	683	1,273	−590
Spain	1	1	0	0	100%	54	0	+54
Tonga	9	9	0	0	100%	301	108	+193
United States	7	7	0	0	100%	305	86	+219
Uruguay	2	2	0	0	100%	89	22	+67
Zimbabwe	3	3	0	0	100%	126	38	+88
Total	819	413	376	30	50.42%	14,670	13,582	+1,088

== Players ==
=== Current squad ===
On 20 October, Wales named a 39-player squad ahead of the 2026 Nations Championship Northern Hemisphere Series.

On 27 October 2026, Macs Page was called into the squad to replace injured Rio Dyer.

Head coach: (Wales) Steve Tandy

- Caps updated: 21 November 2026 (after Wales v Australia)

Player	Position	Date of birth (age)	Caps	Club/province
Liam Belcher	Hooker	28 April 1996 (age 30)	5	(Wales) Cardiff
Ryan Elias	Hooker	7 January 1995 (age 31)	54	(Wales) Scarlets
Dewi Lake (c)	Hooker	16 March 1999 (age 27)	37	(England) Gloucester
Rhys Barratt	Prop	27 October 2002 (age 24)	0	(Wales) Cardiff
Rhys Carré	Prop	8 February 1998 (age 28)	32	(England) Saracens
Tomas Francis	Prop	27 April 1992 (age 34)	83	(England) Sale Sharks
Archie Griffin	Prop	24 July 2001 (age 25)	19	(England) Bath
Dillon Lewis	Prop	4 January 1996 (age 30)	62	(Wales) Dragons
Nicky Smith	Prop	7 April 1994 (age 32)	69	(England) Sale Sharks
Gareth Thomas	Prop	2 August 1993 (age 33)	46	(Wales) Ospreys
Adam Beard	Lock	7 January 1996 (age 30)	69	(France) Montpellier
Ben Carter	Lock	23 January 2001 (age 25)	24	(Wales) Dragons
Seb Davies	Lock	17 May 1996 (age 30)	17	(Wales) Dragons
Dafydd Jenkins	Lock	5 December 2002 (age 23)	34	(England) Exeter Chiefs
Teddy Williams	Lock	18 October 2000 (age 26)	11	(Wales) Cardiff
Taine Basham	Back row	2 November 1999 (age 27)	18	(Wales) Cardiff
James Botham	Back row	22 February 1998 (age 28)	26	(Wales) Cardiff
Kane James	Back row	26 March 2005 (age 21)	2	(England) Exeter Chiefs
Alex Mann	Back row	6 January 2002 (age 24)	20	(Wales) Cardiff
Jac Morgan	Back row	21 January 2000 (age 26)	30	(England) Gloucester
Taine Plumtree	Back row	9 March 2000 (age 26)	17	(Wales) Scarlets
Aaron Wainwright	Back row	25 September 1997 (age 29)	72	(England) Leicester Tigers
Che Hope	Scrum-half	10 January 2003 (age 23)	0	(Wales) Dragons
Reuben Morgan-Williams	Scrum-half	3 February 1998 (age 28)	5	(Wales) Ospreys
Tomos Williams	Scrum-half	1 January 1995 (age 31)	78	(England) Saracens
Sam Costelow	Fly-half	10 January 2001 (age 25)	25	(Wales) Scarlets
Dan Edwards	Fly-half	7 May 2003 (age 23)	15	(Wales) Ospreys
Joe Hawkins	Centre	11 June 2002 (age 24)	13	(Wales) Scarlets
Louie Hennessey	Centre	29 March 2004 (age 22)	3	(England) Bath
Eddie James	Centre	10 August 2002 (age 24)	14	(Wales) Scarlets
Max Llewellyn	Centre	13 January 1999 (age 27)	16	(England) Gloucester
Aneurin Owen	Centre	19 October 2000 (age 26)	0	(Wales) Dragons
Josh Adams	Wing	21 April 1995 (age 31)	74	(Wales) Cardiff
Gabriel Hamer-Webb	Wing	7 November 2000 (age 26)	2	(England) Leicester Tigers
Ellis Mee	Wing	6 October 2003 (age 23)	11	(Wales) Scarlets
Macs Page	Wing	17 December 2004 (age 21)	0	(Wales) Scarlets
Tom Rogers	Wing	17 December 1998 (age 27)	13	(Wales) Ospreys
Blair Murray	Fullback	9 October 2001 (age 25)	22	(Wales) Scarlets
Louis Rees-Zammit	Fullback	2 February 2001 (age 25)	46	(England) Bristol Bears

=== Notable players ===
Eighteen Welsh internationals have been inducted into the World Rugby Hall of Fame. One Welsh player, Shane Williams in 2008, has been awarded World Rugby Player of the Year (formerly known as the International Rugby Board Player of the Year).

=== Individual records ===
See List of Wales national rugby union team records; and List of Wales national rugby union players for a sortable list containing player caps and tries

Neil Jenkins was the first rugby player to surpass 1000 Test points. He holds several Welsh records, including the most points scored for Wales with 1049, the most successful penalty kicks for Wales with 248, and the Welsh record for most points in a single Test match with 30. The record for drop-goals for Wales is held by Jonathan Davies with 13.

Shane Williams is Wales' record try-scorer with 58 tries. Williams is also Wales' record try-scorer in Six Nations Championships with 22 and the Rugby World Cups with 10. Colin Charvis' 22 tries is the all-time Welsh record for a forward, and was the world record for tries by a forward until 2011.

Alun Wyn Jones is the nation's most capped player with 158 Welsh caps. Eight other players have earned 100 caps or more: Gethin Jenkins, Stephen Jones, Gareth Thomas, Martyn Williams, George North, Dan Biggar, Taulupe Faletau and Leigh Halfpenny The record for most matches as captain is held by Alun Wyn Jones with 52. The record for the most consecutive appearances is held by Gareth Edwards who played all 53 of his matches for Wales consecutively between 1967 and 1978. Edwards is also Wales' youngest ever captain at the age of 20.

The youngest player ever capped for Wales is Tom Prydie, who made his debut in Wales' 2010 Six Nations finale on 20 March 2010 against Italy at age 18 years, 25 days, beating the record set by Norman Biggs in 1888. Prydie is also Wales' youngest try-scorer, scored against South Africa in June 2010, overtaking the record that Tom Pearson set on his debut in 1891. Winger George North, aged 18 years 214 days, overtook Pearson's record as the youngest Wales player to score a try on debut in November 2010.

=== Welsh Sports Hall of Fame ===
The following Welsh players have been inducted into the Welsh Sports Hall of Fame:

- 1990 – Ken Jones
- 1991 – Cliff Jones, Cliff Morgan
- 1992 – Gerald Davies
- 1994 – J. P. R. Williams
- 1997 – Bleddyn Williams
- 1998 – Gareth Edwards, Lewis Jones
- 1999 – Carwyn James, Barry John
- 2000 – David Watkins
- 2001 – Mervyn Davies
- 2002 – Gwyn Nicholls
- 2003 – Jonathan Davies, Willie Davies, John Dawes
- 2005 – John Gwilliam
- 2007 – Arthur Gould, Phil Bennett
- 2008 – Billy Trew
- 2009 – J. J. Williams
- 2012 – Bryn Meredith
- 2013 – Clive Rowlands
- 2015 – Wilf Wooller
- 2017 – Graham Price
- 2019 – Steve Fenwick
- 2022 – Maurice Richards
- 2023 – John Devereux
- 2025 – Allan Martin, Terry Cobner

=== Award winners ===
==== World Rugby Awards ====
The following Wales players have been recognised at the World Rugby Awards since 2001:

World Rugby Player of the Year
Year	Nominees	Winners
2008	Ryan Jones	Shane Williams
2008	Shane Williams	Shane Williams
2013	Leigh Halfpenny	—
2015	Alun Wyn Jones	—
2019	Alun Wyn Jones (2)	—

World Rugby Breakthrough Player of the Year
Year	Nominees	Winners
2021	Louis Rees-Zammit	—

World Rugby Dream Team of the Year
Year	No.	Players
2021	1	Wyn Jones

==== Six Nations Player of the Championship ====
The following Wales players have been shortlisted for the Six Nations Player of the Championship since 2004:

Six Nations Player of the Year (2004–08)
Year	Nominees	Winners
2004	Gareth Cooper	—
2004	Michael Owen	—
2004	Gareth Thomas	—
2005	Gavin Henson	Martyn Williams
2005	Stephen Jones	Martyn Williams
2005	Dwayne Peel	Martyn Williams
2005	Martyn Williams	Martyn Williams
2005	Shane Williams	Martyn Williams
2006	Duncan Jones	—
2006	Stephen Jones (2)	—
2006	Dwayne Peel (2)	—
2007	Gethin Jenkins	—
2007	Ryan Jones	—
2007	Dwayne Peel (3)	—
2008	Ryan Jones (2)	Shane Williams
2008	Mike Phillips	Shane Williams
2008	Shane Williams	Shane Williams

Six Nations Player of the Year (2009–16)
Year	Nominees	Winners
2009	Lee Byrne	—
2010	Shane Williams (2)	—
2011	James Hook	—
2011	Sam Warburton	—
2012	Alex Cuthbert	Dan Lydiate
2012	Dan Lydiate	Dan Lydiate
2012	Mike Phillips (2)	Dan Lydiate
2012	Sam Warburton (2)	Dan Lydiate
2013	Dan Biggar	Leigh Halfpenny
2013	Leigh Halfpenny	Leigh Halfpenny
2013	Adam Jones	Leigh Halfpenny
2013	Mike Phillips (3)	Leigh Halfpenny
2014	Sam Warburton (2)	—
2015	Dan Biggar (2)	—
2015	Alun Wyn Jones	—
2016	Gareth Davies	—
2016	George North	—

Six Nations Player of the Year (2017–24)
Year	Nominees	Winners
2017	Ken Owens	—
2017	Rhys Webb	—
2019	Josh Adams	Alun Wyn Jones
2019	Alun Wyn Jones (2)	Alun Wyn Jones
2019	Hadleigh Parkes	Alun Wyn Jones
2019	Liam Williams	Alun Wyn Jones
2021	Taulupe Faletau	—
2021	Louis Rees-Zammit	—

Six Nations Team of the Championship
Year	Forwards		Backs		Total
Year	No.	Players	No.	Players	Total
2021	1.	Wyn Jones	13.	George North	6
2021	2.	Ken Owens	13.	George North	6
2021	5.	Alun Wyn Jones	14.	Louis Rees-Zammit	6
2021	8.	Taulupe Faletau	14.	Louis Rees-Zammit	6
2025	7.	Jac Morgan	—		1
2026	1.	Rhys Carre	—		1

== Coaches ==
Following the unsuccessful tour to South Africa in 1964, the WRU set up a working party on coaching. The party recommended that Welsh clubs accept the principle of coaching. David Nash was appointed as the national team's first coach in 1967, but for the 1968 tour of Argentina, the WRU initially planned not to have a coach tour with the team. Following pressure from the Welsh clubs at the WRU's annual general meeting, the decision was reversed and Clive Rowlands was appointed as coach for the tour. The appointing of a coach for the team coincided with Wales' success in the Five Nations during the 1970s.

=== Coaching history ===
Up to date as of 18th November 2026

Wales' head coaches
Name	Nationality	Years	Matches	Won	Drew	Lost	Win %
David Nash	Wales	1967	5	1	1	3	20%
Clive Rowlands	Wales	1968–1974	29	18	4	7	62.07%
John Dawes	Wales	1974–1979	24	18	0	6	75%
John Lloyd	Wales	1980–1982	14	6	0	8	42.86%
John Bevan	Wales	1982–1985	15	7	1	7	46.67%
Tony Gray	Wales	1985–1988	24	15	0	9	62.5%
John Ryan	Wales	1988–1990	9	2	0	7	22.22%
Ron Waldron	Wales	1990–1991	10	2	1	7	20%
Alan Davies	Wales	1991–1995	35	18	0	17	51.43%
Alex Evans	Australia	1995 (caretaker coach)	4	1	0	3	25%
Kevin Bowring	Wales	1995–1998	29	15	0	14	51.72%
Dennis John	Wales	1998 (caretaker coach)	2	1	0	1	50%
Graham Henry	New Zealand	1998–2002	34	20	1	13	58.82%
Lynn Howells	Wales	2001 (interim coach)	2	2	0	0	100%
Steve Hansen	New Zealand	2002–2004	29	10	0	19	34.48%
Mike Ruddock	Wales	2004–2006	20	13	0	7	65%
Scott Johnson	Australia	2006 (interim coach)	3	0	1	2	0%
Gareth Jenkins	Wales	2006–2007	20	6	1	13	30%
Nigel Davies	Wales	2007 (interim coach)	1	0	0	1	0%
Warren Gatland	New Zealand	2007–2019	125	70	2	53	56%
Robin McBryde	Wales	2009, 2013, 2017 (interim coach)	6	5	0	1	83.33%
Rob Howley	Wales	2012–2013, 2016–2017 (interim coach)	20	10	0	10	50%
Wayne Pivac	New Zealand	2019–2022	34	13	1	20	38.24%
Warren Gatland	New Zealand	2022–2025	26	6	0	20	30%
Matt Sherratt	England	2025 (interim coach)	5	1	0	4	20%
Steve Tandy	Wales	2025–Present	14	5	0	9	35.71%
Total	—N/a	1967–present	537	265	13	259	49.35%

=== Current coaching staff ===
Correct as of 21 July 2026

Position	Name	Nationality
Head coach	Steve Tandy	Wales
Assistant coach	Danny Wilson	England
Attack coach	Matt Sherratt	England
Defence coach	Peter Murchie	Scotland
Specialist contact & skills coach	Dan Lydiate	Wales
Scrum coach	Paul James	Wales
Head of physical performance	Huw Bennett	Wales
Head of performance analysis	Rhodri Bown	Wales
Team doctor	Geoff Davies	Wales
Team manager	Martyn Williams	Wales

== See also ==
- Wales national rugby sevens team
- Welsh Rugby Players Association

== Bibliography ==
- Andrews, David (1991). "Welsh Indigenous! and British Imperial? – Welsh Rugby, Culture, and Society 1890–1914" (PDF). Journal of Sport History. 18 (3): 335–349. Archived from the original (PDF) on 4 March 2016.
- Dine, Philip (2001). French Rugby Football – Cultural History. Berg. ISBN 978-1-85973-327-1.
- Elliott, Matt (2012). Dave Gallaher – The Original All Black Captain (paperback). London: Harper Collins. ISBN 978-1-86950-968-2.
- Griffiths, John (1987). The Phoenix Book of International Rugby Records. London: Phoenix House. ISBN 978-0-460-07003-4.
- Harris, John (2007). "Cool Cymru, rugby union and an imagined community". International Journal of Sociology and Social Policy. 27 (3/4): 151–162. doi:10.1108/01443330710741084.
- Howell, Max (2005). Born to Lead – Wallaby Test Captains. Auckland, New Zealand: Celebrity Books. ISBN 978-1-877252-18-1.
- Morgan, Leighton; Fleming, Scott (2003). "The Development of Coaching in Welsh Rugby Union Football" (PDF). Football Studies. 6 (2): 39–51. Archived from the original (PDF) on 5 March 2012.
- Johnes, Martin (2008). "A Prince, a King, and a Referendum: Rugby, Politics, and Nationhood in Wales, 1969–1979". The Journal of British Studies. 47 (1): 129. doi:10.1086/522347. S2CID 154404908.
- McCarthy, Winston (1968). Haka! The All Blacks Story. London: Pelham Books.
- McLean, Terry (1959). Great Days in New Zealand Rugby. Wellington, New Zealand: A. H. & A. W. Reed.
- McLean, Terry (1969). Red Dragons of Welsh Rugby. Wellington: A. H. & A. W. Reed. ISBN 978-0-589-00395-1.
- Morgan, Gareth (May 2005). "Rugby and Revivalism: Sport and Religion in Edwardian Wales". The International Journal of the History of Sport. 22 (3): 434–456. doi:10.1080/09523360500064057. S2CID 143995387.
- Palenski, Ron (2003). Century in Black – 100 Years of All Black Test Rugby. Hodder Moa Beckett Publishers Limited. ISBN 978-1-86958-937-0.
- Parry-Jones, David (1999). Prince Gwyn, Gwyn Nicholls and the First Golden Era of Welsh Rugby. Bridgend: seren. ISBN 978-1-85411-262-0.
- Peatey, Lance (2011). In Pursuit of Bill: A Complete History of the Rugby World Cup. New Holland Publishers. ISBN 978-1-74257-191-1.
- Potter, Alex; Duthen, Georges (1961). The Rise of French Rugby. Wellington: A. H. & A. W. Reed.
- Richards, Huw (2006). A Game for Hooligans. Mainstream Publishing. ISBN 978-1-84596-016-2.
- Ryan, Greg (2005). The Contest for Rugby Supremacy – Accounting for the 1905 All Blacks. Canterbury University Press. ISBN 978-1-877257-36-0.
- Sheers, Owen (2013). Calon: A Journey to the Heart of Welsh Rugby. Faber & Faber. ISBN 978-0-571-29731-3.
- Smith, David; Williams, Gareth (1980). Fields of Praise: The Official History of The Welsh Rugby Union. Cardiff: University of Wales Press. ISBN 978-0-7083-0766-3.
- Vincent, G. T. (1998). "Practical Imperialism: The Anglo-Welsh Rugby Tour of New Zealand, 1908". The International Journal of the History of Sport. 15 (1): 123–140. doi:10.1080/09523369808714015.
