= Taine Plumtree =

Welsh rugby union player (born 2000)

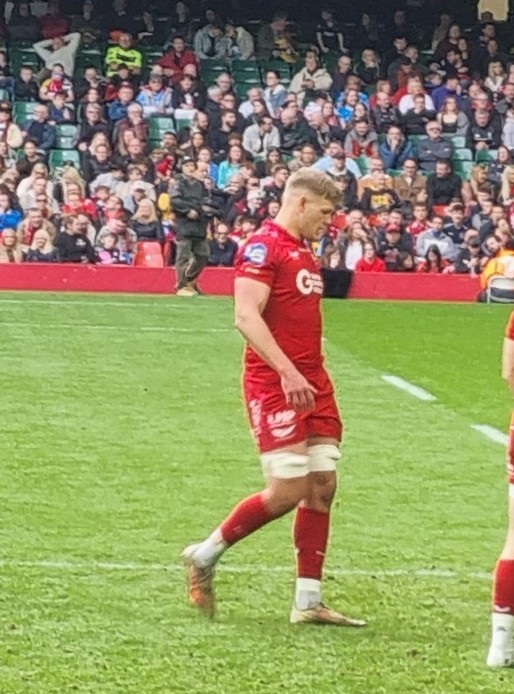
- Judgement Day 2025
- Born: 9 March 2000 (age 26) Swansea, Wales
- Height: 195 cm (6 ft 5 in)
- Weight: 108 kg (238 lb; 17 st 0 lb)
- School: Wellington College
- Notable relative: John Plumtree (father)

Rugby union career
- Position: Blindside Flanker
- Current team: Scarlets
Senior career
Years	Team	Apps	(Points)
2020–2022	Wellington	23	(20)
2021–2023	Blues	6	(10)
2023–	Scarlets	43	(60)
- Correct as of 13 August 2026
International career
Years	Team	Apps	(Points)
2019	New Zealand U20	5	(10)
2023–	Wales	17	(5)
- Correct as of 18 November 2026

Taine Plumtree (born 9 March 2000) is a Welsh professional rugby union player who plays as a flanker for the Scarlets in the United Rugby Championship. Plumtree began his career with Wellington in the NPC, and played for the Blues in Super Rugby. Plumtree has represented Wales, making his debut on 5 August 2023.

== Club career ==
=== Wellington and Blues ===
Plumtree was a member of the Wellington 2020 Mitre 10 Cup squad. He was named in the Blues squad for the 2021 Super Rugby Aotearoa season, making his debut during the season.

Plumtree scored a hattrick for Wellington against Northland in the opening round of the 2021 Bunnings NPC.

=== Scarlets ===
On 27 June 2023, Plumtree signed for the Scarlets. Plumtree made his first Scarlets appearance in a preseason friendly against the Barbarians, along with fellow new signing Ioan Lloyd. Plumtree and Lloyd made their competitive debuts for the Scarlets together against the Bulls on the Scarlets’ South African tour.

Plumtree signed an extension on 3 April 2025.

== International career ==
=== New Zealand U20 ===
Plumtree was part of the New Zealand U20 squad for the 2019 World Rugby Under 20 Championship.

=== Wales ===
On 3 July 2023, Plumtree joined the Wales squad for their World Cup training camp in Switzerland. Despite representing New Zealand U20, Plumtree qualified for Wales via birth, and was not bound to New Zealand.

Plumtree made his debut on 5 August 2023, coming off the bench for Wales in the first test of their 2023 Rugby World Cup warm-up matches, against England. Plumtree missed out on selection for the final squad due to a shoulder injury.

On 4 November 2023 Plumtree played for Wales in a friendly against the Barbarians, coming off the bench and scoring a try.

A recurrence of a shoulder injury ruled him out of the 2024 Six Nations Championship.

While not selected in the initial squad for the 2025 Six Nations Championship, Plumtree was later added due to injury concerns. He featured in the second test of the 2025 Wales rugby union tour of Japan, providing an offload to allow Dan Edwards to score and secure Wales’ first win in 19 tests.

Plumtree was selected for the 2025 end-of-year rugby union internationals. He came off the bench in the second half in the match against Japan. Plumtree started against New Zealand, and received a yellow card in the second half for ill-discipline.

Plumtree was named in the squad for the 2026 Six Nations by Steve Tandy.

== Personal life ==
The son of former New Zealand sevens player and rugby coach John Plumtree, Taine was born in Wales while his father coached Swansea RFC, and later moved to South Africa when John was head coach of the Sharks. Plumtree also qualified internationally for South Africa, through his mother. Taine and his brother Reece both attended Wellington College and played for their rugby team.
