= Iwan Shenton =

Welsh rugby union footballer

- Born: Iwan Shenton; 2 June 2000 (age 26)
- Height: 194 cm (6 ft 4 in)
- Weight: 110 kg (17 st 5 lb; 240 lb)
- University: Cardiff Metropolitan University

Rugby union career
- Position: Flanker
- Current team: Scarlets
Youth career
- Tonna RFC
Senior career
Years	Team	Apps	(Points)
2018–2019	Aberavon	15	(5)
2022–2024	Scarlets	12	(5)
2022–2023	Llanelli	12	(5)
2024–2024	Ampthill (loan)	10	(0)
2024–2025	UBCOB Ravens		
2025–2026	AS Monaco Rugby	6	
2025–2026	Swansea RFC	16	(10)
- Correct as of 23 March 2024

Iwan Shenton is a Welsh rugby union player who plays as a flanker for United Rugby Championship side Scarlets.

== Professional career ==
=== Youth and amateur rugby ===
As a youth player, Shenton played for Tonna RFC and was part of the Ospreys Academy. He also captained Cardiff Met in the BUCS Super Rugby competition. Shenton played for Aberavon in the Indigo Group Premiership.

Shenton also played for Llanelli RFC, serving as captain on numerous occasions.

=== Scarlets ===
For the 2022–2023 season, Shenton signed for the Scarlets. Shenton made his first appearance in a preseason friendly against Bristol Bears. He made his competitive debut for the Scarlets in Round 7 of the 2022–23 United Rugby Championship against Leinster. On 10 March 2023, Shenton started against the Saracens in a friendly, and scored his first try.

=== Ampthill ===
In February 2024, Shenton joined Ampthill on loan for the remainder of the 2023–24 season. Shenton made his debut on 24 February 2024 against Coventry.
