= Ben Williams (rugby union, born 2002) =

Welsh rugby union player

- Born: Ben Williams; 23 April 2002 (age 24) Coed-Ely, Wales
- Height: 188 cm (6 ft 2 in)
- Weight: 110 kg (17 st 5 lb; 240 lb)

Rugby union career
- Position(s): Number 8, Flanker
Youth career
- Gilfach Goch RFC
Senior career
Years	Team	Apps	(Points)
2021–2022	Aberavon	3	(0)
2022–2023	Llanelli	15	(10)
2023–2026	Scarlets	18	(0)
2024–2026	Carmarthen Quins	24	(25)
2026–	Pontypool		
International career
Years	Team	Apps	(Points)
2022	Wales U20	3	(0)

Ben Williams (born 23 April 2002) is a Welsh rugby union player who previously played for the Scarlets as a number 8 or flanker. He is a Wales under-20 international.

== Professional career ==
Williams started playing for Gilfach Goch RFC as a youth player. Williams was not initially part of any regional academy, but earned a development contract with Aberavon RFC. In 2022, he joined the Ospreys academy, but joined the Scarlets academy in 2022. Williams also plays for Llanelli RFC, and has captained the side in the Indigo Premiership.

In 2022, Williams was selected for Wales U20 for the 2022 U20 Six Nations Summer Series, making three appearances.

On 18 February 2023, Williams made his debut for the Scarlets, coming on in the second half in the 42–14 win over Edinburgh. On 10 March 2023, Williams made his first start, playing as an openside flanker in a friendly against the Saracens.

Williams signed an extension with the Scarlets on 15 March 2024. Williams was released by the Scarlets at the end of the 2025–26 United Rugby Championship. He subsequently signed with Pontypool RFC.
