= Coleg Sir Gâr =

Further education college in Llanelli, Wales

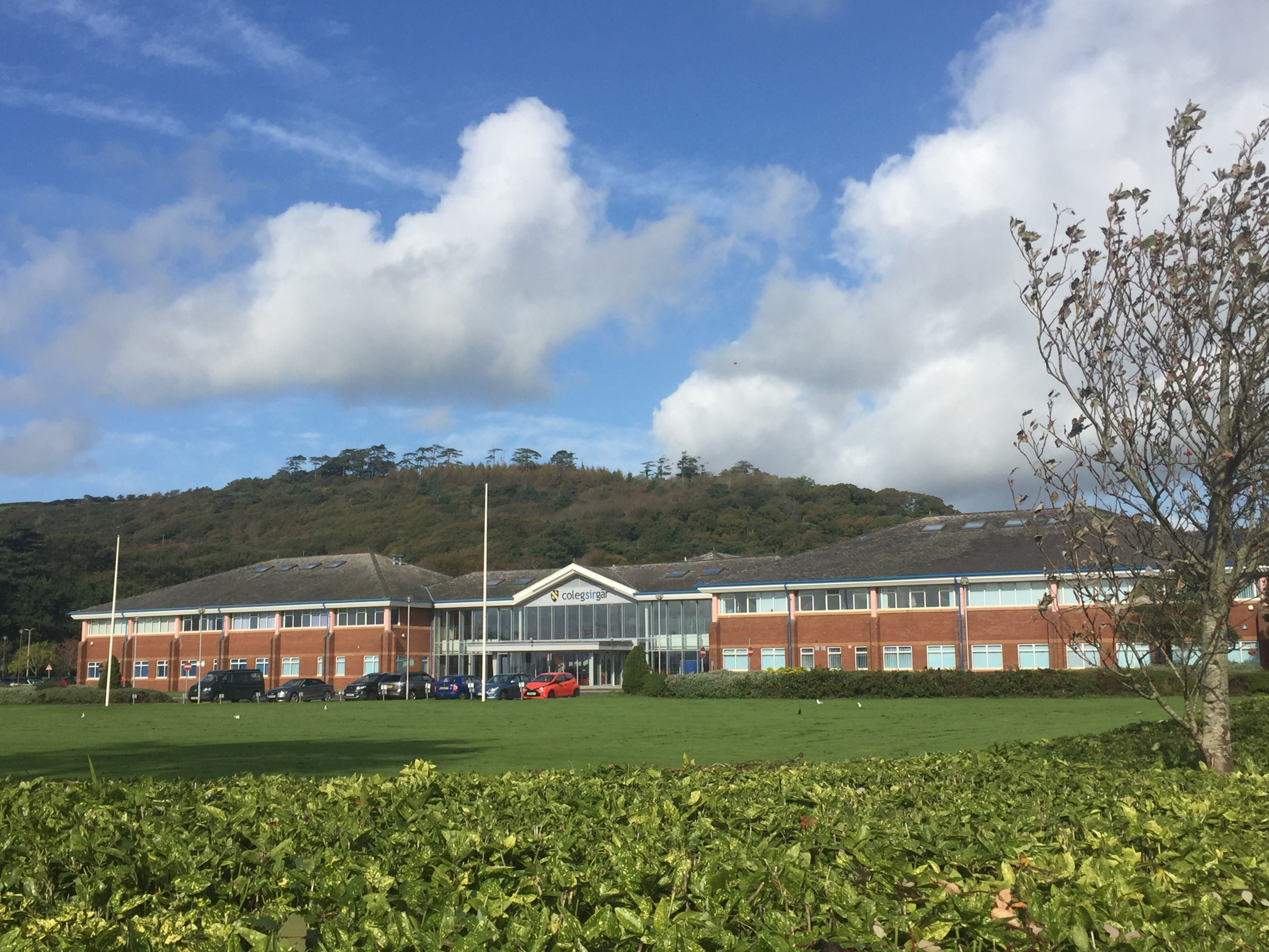

Location
- Sandy Road; Pwll, Llanelli, Carmarthenshire, SA15 4DN; Wales; 51.687°N 4.188°W

Information
- Type: FE college
- Established: 1985
- Local authority: Carmarthenshire County Council
- Ofsted: Reports
- Principal: Andrew Cornish
- Gender: Mixed
- Age: 14 to any
- Enrolment: 10,000
- Website: www.colegsirgar.ac.uk

Coleg Sir Gâr is a further education college in Carmarthenshire, Wales, with five campuses across the county.

== The college ==
Coleg Sir Gâr is a large, multi-site, further education college. It is part of the University of Wales Trinity Saint David Group. The college is based in South West Wales and has five main campuses. They vary in size and nature and offer a variety of subjects. The college offers further education, adult and community learning, higher education and work-based learning. There are about 10,000 students in all, of whom some 3,000 are full-time and 7,000 are part-time. There are over 900 higher education students.

The college has a broad range of academic and vocational education and training programmes, including tailor-made training for employers. Courses range from pre-entry to postgraduate level. It also offers its provision on-line, via partnerships at community locations and in the workplace. Work-based training programmes such as foundation and modern apprenticeships are also offered. The college also provides for around 1000 school pupils aged 14–19 who attend the college or are taught by college staff at their schools.

A new principal was appointed on 31 August 2018, following the retirement of Barry Liles.

The college has an annual turnover of around £30m and employs about 850 staff. Roughly 450 of these are directly involved in teaching and 400 perform support and administrative functions.

The college took over Coleg Ceredigion, previously a direct subsidiary of University of Wales Trinity St David, in August 2017.

== Campuses ==
Coleg Sir Gâr

- Graig, Sandy Road, Pwll, Llanelli (51.6865°N 4.1885°W)
- Pibwrlwyd, Carmarthen (51.8406°N 4.3074°W)
- Ammanford (51.7956°N 3.9992°W)
- Gelli Aur, Llandeilo (51.8706°N 4.0451°W)
- Jobs Well, Jobs Well Road, Carmarthen (51.8568°N 4.3284°W)

Coleg Ceredigion

- Aberystwyth Campus (52.4104°N 4.0532°W)
- Cardigan Campus (52.0872°N 4.6567°W).

== History ==
The name of the college is Welsh for Carmarthenshire College.

Coleg Sir Gâr has been providing further education since 1985. It was first created as Carmarthenshire College of Technology and Art (CCTA) by merging several technical colleges and the Dyfed College of Art. In 1992, the college became an independent corporation, having previously been under the control of the local education authority. Since 1 August 2013, the college has been part of the University of Wales Trinity Saint David Group.

The Graig Campus, Llanelli, was formerly occupied by Graig Comprehensive School and Llanelli Boys' Grammar School. As CCTA, the Llanelli campus was based at Alban Road in Llanelli. This was the site of former Llanelli Technical College.

Carmarthen School of Art originated in 1854. It combined with the Llanelli college in 1971 to become Dyfed College of Art. In 1979 the new campus at Jobs Well Road, Carmarthen was built.

== Virtual college ==
The virtualcollege.ac.uk was created in 1998 by Coleg Sir Gâr to meet the growing demands of industry in Carmarthenshire. The training courses developed were delivered completely online in the area of IT skills. Since then the virtual college has expanded to include almost 1000 courses in a number of areas, amongst them teacher training, accountancy, business, leadership and management, health and safety and languages. All the accredited courses are delivered completely online supported by tutors from the college.

== Notable former pupils ==
- Josh Adams, rugby union player
- Kenneth Bowen, tenor at the Royal Academy of Music
- Gareth Davies, rugby union player
- David Gray, singer and songwriter
- Terry Price, rugby union player
- Scott Williams, rugby union player
