= Macs Page =

Welsh rugby union player

- Born: 17 December 2004 (age 21) Dinas Cross, Wales
- Height: 178 cm (5 ft 10 in)
- Weight: 88 kg (13 st 12 lb)
- School: Ysgol y Preseli

Rugby union career
- Position(s): Centre, wing
- Current team: Scarlets
Senior career
Years	Team	Apps	(Points)
2022	Llanelli	1	(0)
2023–	Llandovery	22	(60)
2024–	Scarlets	21	(25)
International career
Years	Team	Apps	(Points)
2024	Wales U20	9	(25)

Macs Page (born 17 December 2004) is a Welsh rugby union player who plays at centre for United Rugby Championship side Scarlets and the Wales national under-20 rugby union team.

== Early life ==
From Pembrokeshire, he attended Ysgol y Preseli and played at youth level with Fishguard RFC minis and Crymych RFC’s Juniors and Youth teams. Page then concentrated on football, and was in the academy of Swansea City for three years.

== Club career ==
=== Llanelli and Llandovery ===
Page made his debut for Llanelli RFC on 21 April 2022, in Llanelli’s final match of the season.

Page has also featured for Llandovery RFC. Page scored a try against Cardiff RFC to secure their place in the 2023–24 Indigo Group Premiership final. Llandovery won the final against Newport RFC, with Page starting on the wing. Page scored a hat-trick of tries against Newport RFC on 5 January 2025.

=== Scarlets ===
Page returned to rugby to link up with Scarlets at under-16 age group, before briefly returning to football for three months, until once again coming back to rugby. Page signed his first academy contract with the Scarlets on 9 November 2021. He was retained in the academy for the following season.

He made his league debut for Scarlets in the United Rugby Championship during the 2023-24 season against Zebre Parma in May 2024.

Page scored his first try for the Scarlets in the opening round of the 2024–25 season, against Benetton, and followed it up with a second try the following week against Cardiff, 14 seconds into the match. Page made his first start in a EPCR Challenge Cup fixture on 10 January 2025, having come off the bench earlier in the season. Page signed a senior contract on 27 February 2025.

Page was awarded with the teams try of the season award, for his solo effort against Zebre.

== International career ==
=== Wales U18 and U20 ===
In 2022, Page was involved with Wales U18, starting in a match against England.

He played for Wales U20 in the U20 Six Nations in 2024. He was named in the team of the tournament playing for Wales U20 at the World Rugby U20 Championship, where his performances included a hat trick of tries against Australia U20.

=== Wales ===
Ahead of the 2024 end-of-year rugby union internationals, Page was invited to train with Wales, but not officially added to the squad.

Page was called up to the national squad for the 2025 Wales rugby union tour of Japan. Page was widely tipped for a call up for the 2026 Nations Championship fixtures in November, but left out of the initial squad. He was later added to the squad after an injury to Rio Dyer.

== Personal life ==
Outside of rugby, Page studied an electrical and plumbing services course at Pembrokeshire College.
