= History of the Wales national rugby union team (2004–present) =

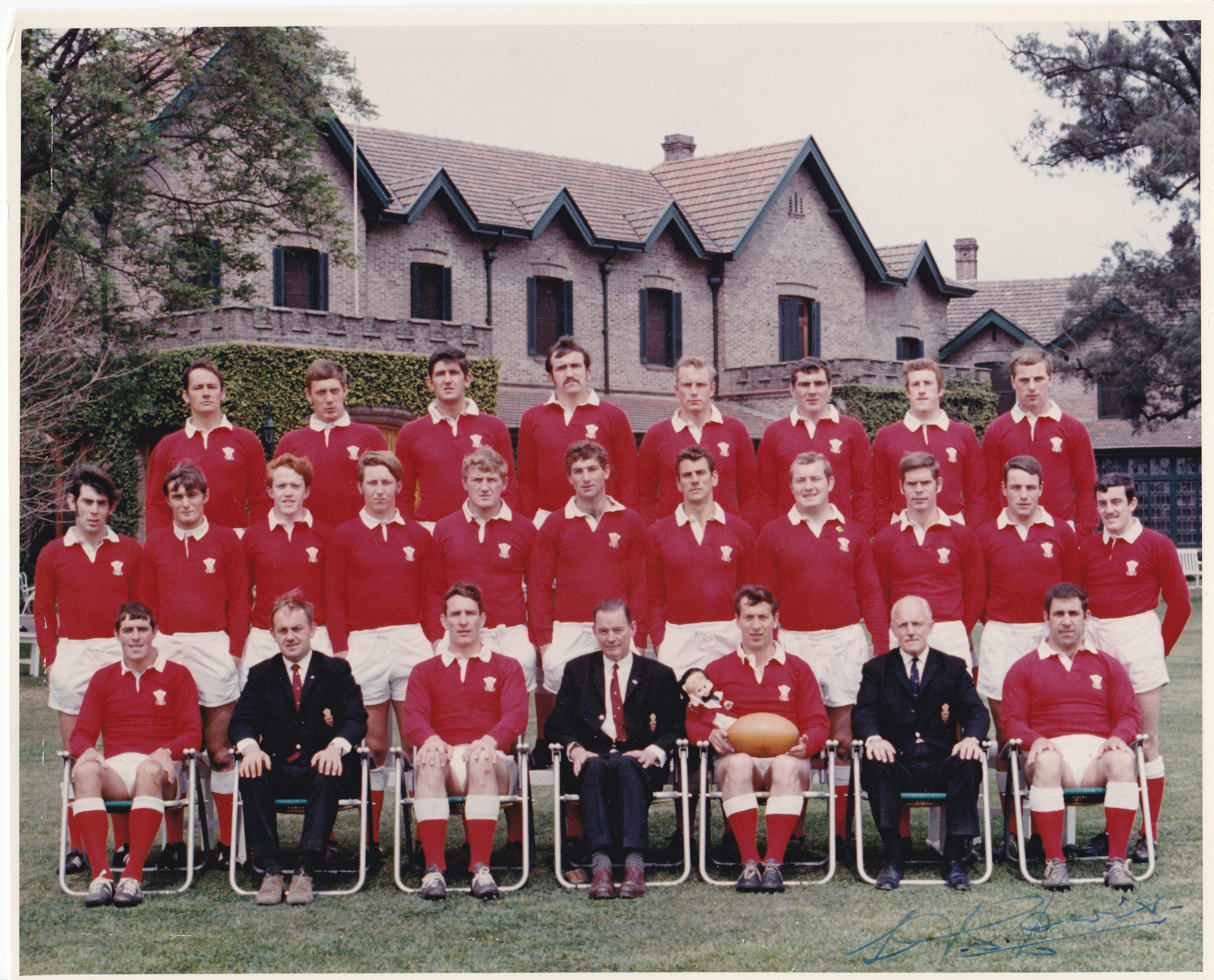
Wales v Arg Squad Photo, 1968

The history of the Wales national rugby union team from 2005 to present (note that, as of September 2019, and despite reaching Number One in the Men's World Rugby Rankings for the first time in history, for a period of two weeks in late August 2019, the rest of this article barely goes beyond 2015) covers a period where the side won four Grand Slams in the Six Nations Championship, as well as another Championship victory. The Grand Slams, in all the tournament matches, were achieved in 2005, 2008, 2012 and 2019. Their other Six Nations Championship, in 2013, was won without achieving a Grand Slam. The country has not enjoyed as much success against the major southern hemisphere opposition of Australia, New Zealand and South Africa. New Zealand have not been defeated by Wales since 1953, and South Africa have only been defeated five times since 2005: a 12–6 victory in 2014, a 27–13 victory in 2016, a 24–22 victory in 2017, a 24–22 victory in Washington DC in 2018 followed by a 20–11 win in Cardiff in 2018. Wales defeated Australia in November 2005, and also in November 2008. Following this, Wales suffered a thirteen-match losing streak to the Wallabies. This ended in 2018, when Wales defeated Australia 9–6.

Wales were defeated by Fiji in a crucial 2007 Rugby World Cup match, which saw the side eliminated from the tournament in pool play. They had greater success in 2011, where they progressed to the semi-finals and faced France. They were eliminated in a 9–8 loss, and eventually finished fourth in the tournament, their best World Cup result since 1987.

== History ==
Coached by Mike Ruddock, Wales won their first Six Nations Grand Slam in 2005. They opened with an 11–9 win over England at the Millennium Stadium, thanks to a late long range penalty from Gavin Henson. After a 38–8 win over Italy, Wales faced France, and were behind 15–6 at half-time. Wales fought back in the second half to win 24–18, and the game was arguably one of the most exciting of that year's tournament. Wales beat Scotland away (46–22) and then, in front of a capacity crowd at the Millennium Stadium, played their final game against Ireland. Wales' 32–20 victory gave them their first championship title since 1994 and their first Grand Slam since 1978.

The 41–3 loss to the All Blacks at the Millennium Stadium later that year was their biggest loss on Welsh soil. This was followed by a single-point win over Fiji, then a loss to South Africa, and lastly a win over Australia.

On 14 February 2006, midway through the Six Nations, Mike Ruddock resigned as the head coach of Wales, for family reasons. Scott Johnson took over as caretaker coach for the remaining games, and Wales eventually finished fifth in the 2006 Championship before Gareth Jenkins was appointed as head coach on 27 April. On 10 May 2007, Wales and Australia decided to celebrate 100 years of Test rugby between the two countries with the establishment of the James Bevan Trophy. It is named after the Australian-born Welsh-raised man who was Welsh team's first captain; Australia won the series 2–0.

The revival stuttered at the 2007 World Cup, as Wales failed to advance beyond the pool stage following a loss to Fiji. Coach Gareth Jenkins subsequently lost his job, and Warren Gatland, a New Zealander and former All Black, was appointed as Wales' new head coach on 9 November 2007. He had previously coached New Zealand province Waikato – leading them to success in the 2006 Air New Zealand Cup. His inaugural match as coach was Wales' first match of the 2008 Six Nations Championship, against England at Twickenham. England were favourites and led by 13 points at half-time, before Wales fought back to win 26–19 – their first victory at Twickenham since 1988. Wales went unbeaten throughout the tournament, and won their second Grand Slam in four Championships after defeating France 29–12 at the Millennium Stadium. Wales conceded only two tries in the entire tournament, halving the previous record of four tries conceded by England in both 2002 and 2003.

In the 2008 end-of-year Tests Wales were defeated by both New Zealand and South Africa, but claimed wins over Canada and Australia. Wales' 21–18 victory made them the only Northern Hemisphere nation to defeat a Tri-Nations country in 2008, and sent them up to fifth in the world rankings and later fourth. Wales failed to retain their Six Nations Championship in 2009 after losing 17–15 to Ireland on the last day. The defeat gave Ireland the Grand Slam, and left Wales fourth on points difference despite their three wins.

At the 2011 World Cup, Wales defeated Fiji, Namibia and Samoa, only narrowly losing to South Africa at the pool stages. In the quarter-finals, they faced Ireland, beating them 22–10, hence reaching the semi-finals for the first time since 1987. It was at the semi-final stage that Wales came up short by the narrowest of margins, losing 9–8 to France after a red card for captain Sam Warburton in the 18th minute.

On 17 March 2012, Wales completed their third Six Nations Grand Slam in eight years, with a 16–9 victory over France at the Millennium Stadium in the 2012 Six Nations Championship. The victory over France was seen, by many, as the ultimate revenge for their narrow world cup semi-final defeat. After the 2012 Grand Slam Wales suffered 8 consecutive defeats (4 versus Australia), including a record run of 5 home defeats. The losing streak was broken in round 2 of the 2013 Six Nations Championship with Wales beating France 16–6 in Paris. On 9 March 2013 versus Scotland, Wales achieved a record fifth consecutive away win in the Six Nations. Wales retained the Six Nations Championship after beating England in their final match by a record winning margin 30–3. This was the first time Wales had retained the Championship since their 1978/1979 championship wins.

Despite these results, Wales was 9th in the World Rankings in December 2012. Therefore, the team was placed in Pot 3 of the pool stage draw for the 2015 Rugby World Cup. Wales was drawn in Pool A with Australia and England, which the press described as the group of death.

== See also ==
- List of Wales national rugby union team results
- Wales at the Rugby World Cup

== Bibliography ==
- Peatey, Lance (2011). In Pursuit of Bill: A Complete History of the Rugby World Cup. New Holland Publishers. ISBN 9781742571911.
