= List of Wales national rugby union team results =

The following is a list of Wales national rugby union team results since the first match in 1881.

== Summary ==
Below is table of the representative rugby matches played by a Wales national XV at test level up until 4 September 2026.

Opponent	Played	Won	Lost	Drawn	Win %	PF	PA	+/−
Argentina	24	14	9	1	58%	622	574	+48
Australia	49	14	34	1	29%	830	1,190	−360
Barbarians	11	5	6	0	45%	339	311	+28
Canada	13	12	1	0	92%	528	219	+309
England	144	61	71	12	42%	1,804	2,042	−238
Fiji	16	13	2	1	81%	486	259	+227
France	106	51	52	3	48%	1,634	1,716	–82
Georgia	5	4	1	0	80%	129	52	+77
Ireland	137	70	60	7	51%	1,681	1,695	–14
Italy	35	29	5	1	83%	1,157	563	+594
Japan	13	11	2	0	85%	600	228	+372
Namibia	4	4	0	0	100%	171	69	+102
New Zealand	38	3	35	0	8%	456	1,271	−815
New Zealand Natives	1	1	0	0	100%	1G	0G	+1G
New Zealand Services	1	0	1	0	0%	3	6	−3
Pacific Islanders	1	1	0	0	100%	38	20	+18
Portugal	2	2	0	0	100%	130	19	+111
Romania	8	6	2	0	75%	342	96	+246
Samoa	10	6	4	0	60%	235	180	+55
Scotland	132	75	54	3	57%	1,863	1,496	+367
South Africa	45	7	37	1	16%	683	1,273	−590
Spain	1	1	0	0	100%	54	0	+54
Tonga	9	9	0	0	100%	301	108	+193
United States	7	7	0	0	100%	305	86	+219
Uruguay	2	2	0	0	100%	89	22	+67
Zimbabwe	3	3	0	0	100%	126	38	+88
Total	810	408	372	30	50.37%	14,442	13,330	+1,112

== Results ==
Date	Venue	Home team	Away team	Score	Competition	Winner	Head coach	Match report
19 February 1881	Richardson's Field	England	Wales	7G 6T 1D–0		England	N/A	
28 January 1882	Lansdowne Road	Ireland	Wales	0–2G 2T		Wales	N/A	
16 December 1882	St. Helen's	Wales	England	0–2G 4T	1883 Home Nations Championship	England	N/A	
8 January 1883	Raeburn Place	Scotland	Wales	3G–1G	1883 Home Nations Championship	Scotland	N/A	
5 January 1884	Cardigan Fields	England	Wales	1G 2T–1G	1884 Home Nations Championship	England	N/A	
12 January 1884	Rodney Parade	Wales	Scotland	0–1T 1D	1884 Home Nations Championship	Scotland	N/A	
12 April 1884	Cardiff Arms Park/National Stadium	Wales	Ireland	2T 1D–0	1884 Home Nations Championship	Wales	N/A	
3 January 1885	St. Helen's	Wales	England	1G 1T–1G 4T	1885 Home Nations Championship	England	N/A	
10 January 1885	Hamilton Crescent	Scotland	Wales	0–0	1885 Home Nations Championship	Draw	N/A	
2 January 1886	Rectory Field	England	Wales	2T 1M–1G	1886 Home Nations Championship	England	N/A	
9 January 1886	Cardiff Arms Park/National Stadium	Wales	Scotland	0–2G 1T	1886 Home Nations Championship	Scotland	N/A	
8 January 1887	Stradey Park	Wales	England	0–0	1887 Home Nations Championship	Draw	N/A	
26 February 1887	Raeburn Place	Scotland	Wales	4G 8T–0	1887 Home Nations Championship	Scotland	N/A	
12 March 1887	Upper Park	Ireland	Wales	3T–1T 1D	1887 Home Nations Championship	Wales	N/A	
4 February 1888	Rodney Parade	Wales	Scotland	1T–0	1888 Home Nations Championship	Wales	N/A	
3 March 1888	Lansdowne Road	Ireland	Wales	1 G 1T 1D–0	1888 Home Nations Championship	Ireland	N/A	
22 December 1888	St. Helen's	Wales	New Zealand Natives	1G 2T–0	1888–89 New Zealand Native football team	Wales	N/A	
2 February 1889	Raeburn Place	Scotland	Wales	2T–0	1889 Home Nations Championship	Scotland	N/A	
2 March 1889	Stradey Park	Wales	Ireland	0–2T	1889 Home Nations Championship	Ireland	N/A	
1 February 1890	Cardiff Arms Park/National Stadium	Wales	Scotland	2–8	1890 Home Nations Championship	Scotland	N/A	
15 February 1890	Crown Flatt	England	Wales	0–1	1890 Home Nations Championship	Wales	N/A	
1 March 1890	Lansdowne Road	Ireland	Wales	3–3	1890 Home Nations Championship	Draw	N/A	
3 January 1891	Rodney Parade	Wales	England	3–7	1891 Home Nations Championship	England	N/A	
7 February 1891	Raeburn Place	Scotland	Wales	15–0	1891 Home Nations Championship	Scotland	N/A	
7 March 1891	Stradey Park	Wales	Ireland	6–4	1891 Home Nations Championship	Wales	N/A	
2 January 1892	Rectory Field	England	Wales	17–0	1892 Home Nations Championship	England	N/A	
6 February 1892	St. Helen's	Wales	Scotland	2–7	1892 Home Nations Championship	Scotland	N/A	
5 March 1892	Lansdowne Road	Ireland	Wales	9–0	1892 Home Nations Championship	Ireland	N/A	
7 January 1893	Cardiff Arms Park/National Stadium	Wales	England	12–11	1893 Home Nations Championship	Wales	N/A	
4 February 1893	Raeburn Place	Scotland	Wales	0–9	1893 Home Nations Championship	Wales	N/A	
11 March 1893	Stradey Park	Wales	Ireland	2–0	1893 Home Nations Championship	Wales	N/A	
4 January 1894	Upper Park	England	Wales	24–3	1894 Home Nations Championship	England	N/A	
3 February 1894	Rodney Parade	Wales	Scotland	7–0	1894 Home Nations Championship	Wales	N/A	
10 March 1894	Ballynafeigh	Ireland	Wales	3–0	1894 Home Nations Championship	Ireland	N/A	
5 January 1895	St. Helen's	Wales	England	6–14	1895 Home Nations Championship	England	N/A	
26 January 1895	Raeburn Place	Scotland	Wales	5–4	1895 Home Nations Championship	Scotland	N/A	
16 March 1895	Cardiff Arms Park/National Stadium	Wales	Ireland	5–3	1895 Home Nations Championship	Wales	N/A	
4 January 1896	Rectory Field	England	Wales	25–0	1896 Home Nations Championship	England	N/A	
25 January 1896	Cardiff Arms Park/National Stadium	Wales	Scotland	6–0	1896 Home Nations Championship	Wales	N/A	
17 March 1896	Lansdowne Road	Ireland	Wales	8–4	1896 Home Nations Championship	Ireland	N/A	
9 January 1897	Rodney Parade	Wales	England	11–0	1897 Home Nations Championship	Wales	N/A	
19 March 1898	Thomond Park	Ireland	Wales	3–11	1898 Home Nations Championship	Wales	N/A	
2 April 1898	Rectory Field	England	Wales	14–7	1898 Home Nations Championship	England	N/A	
7 January 1899	St. Helen's	Wales	England	26–3	1899 Home Nations Championship	Wales	N/A	
4 March 1899	Inverleith	Scotland	Wales	21–10	1899 Home Nations Championship	Scotland	N/A	
18 March 1899	Cardiff Arms Park/National Stadium	Wales	Ireland	0–3	1899 Home Nations Championship	Ireland	N/A	
6 January 1900	Kingsholm Stadium	England	Wales	3–13	1900 Home Nations Championship	Wales	N/A	
27 January 1900	St. Helen's	Wales	Scotland	12–3	1900 Home Nations Championship	Wales	N/A	
17 March 1900	Balmoral Showgrounds	Ireland	Wales	0–3	1900 Home Nations Championship	Wales	N/A	
5 January 1901	Cardiff Arms Park/National Stadium	Wales	England	13–0	1901 Home Nations Championship	Wales	N/A	
9 February 1901	Inverleith	Scotland	Wales	18–8	1901 Home Nations Championship	Scotland	N/A	
16 March 1901	St. Helen's	Wales	Ireland	10–9	1901 Home Nations Championship	Wales	N/A	
11 January 1902	Rectory Field	England	Wales	8–9	1902 Home Nations Championship	Wales	N/A	
1 February 1902	Cardiff Arms Park/National Stadium	Wales	Scotland	14–5	1902 Home Nations Championship	Wales	N/A	
6 March 1902	Lansdowne Road	Ireland	Wales	0–15	1902 Home Nations Championship	Wales	N/A	
10 January 1903	St. Helen's	Wales	England	21–5	1903 Home Nations Championship	Wales	N/A	
7 February 1903	Inverleith	Scotland	Wales	6–0	1903 Home Nations Championship	Scotland	N/A	
14 March 1903	Cardiff Arms Park/National Stadium	Wales	Ireland	18–0	1903 Home Nations Championship	Wales	N/A	
9 January 1904	Welford Road Stadium	England	Wales	14–14	1904 Home Nations Championship	Draw	N/A	
6 February 1904	St. Helen's	Wales	Scotland	21–3	1904 Home Nations Championship	Wales	N/A	
12 March 1904	Balmoral Showgrounds	Ireland	Wales	14–12	1904 Home Nations Championship	Ireland	N/A	
14 January 1905	Cardiff Arms Park/National Stadium	Wales	England	25–0	1905 Home Nations Championship	Wales	N/A	
4 February 1905	Inverleith	Scotland	Wales	3–6	1905 Home Nations Championship	Wales	N/A	
11 March 1905	St. Helen's	Wales	Ireland	10–3	1905 Home Nations Championship	Wales	N/A	
16 December 1905	Cardiff Arms Park/National Stadium	Wales	New Zealand	3–0	The Original All Blacks	Wales	N/A	
13 January 1906	Athletic Ground	England	Wales	3–16	1906 Home Nations Championship	Wales	N/A	
3 February 1906	Cardiff Arms Park/National Stadium	Wales	Scotland	9–3	1906 Home Nations Championship	Wales	N/A	
10 March 1906	Balmoral Showgrounds	Ireland	Wales	11–6	1906 Home Nations Championship	Ireland	N/A	
1 December 1906	St. Helen's	Wales	South Africa	0–11	1906–07 tour of Europe	South Africa	N/A	
12 January 1907	St. Helen's	Wales	England	22–0	1907 Home Nations Championship	Wales	N/A	
2 February 1907	Inverleith	Scotland	Wales	6–3	1907 Home Nations Championship	Scotland	N/A	
9 March 1907	Cardiff Arms Park/National Stadium	Wales	Ireland	29–0	1907 Home Nations Championship	Wales	N/A	
18 January 1908	Ashton Gate Stadium	England	Wales	18–28	1908 Home Nations Championship	Wales	N/A	
1 February 1908	St. Helen's	Wales	Scotland	6–5	1908 Home Nations Championship	Wales	N/A	
2 March 1908	Cardiff Arms Park/National Stadium	Wales	France	36–4		Wales	N/A	
14 March 1908	Balmoral Showgrounds	Ireland	Wales	5–11	1908 Home Nations Championship	Wales	N/A	
12 December 1908	Cardiff Arms Park/National Stadium	Wales	Australia	9–6	1908–09 tour of the British Isles	Wales	N/A	
16 January 1909	Cardiff Arms Park/National Stadium	Wales	England	8–0	1909 Home Nations Championship	Wales	N/A	
6 February 1909	Inverleith	Scotland	Wales	3–5	1909 Home Nations Championship	Wales	N/A	
23 February 1909	Colombes	France	Wales	5–47		Wales	N/A	
13 March 1909	St. Helen's	Wales	Ireland	18–5	1909 Home Nations Championship	Wales	N/A	
1 January 1910	St. Helen's	Wales	France	49–14	1910 Five Nations Championship	Wales	N/A	
15 January 1910	Twickenham Stadium	England	Wales	11–6	1910 Five Nations Championship	England	N/A	
5 February 1910	Cardiff Arms Park/National Stadium	Wales	Scotland	14–0	1910 Five Nations Championship	Wales	N/A	
12 March 1910	Lansdowne Road	Ireland	Wales	3–19	1910 Five Nations Championship	Wales	N/A	
21 January 1911	St. Helen's	Wales	England	15–11	1911 Five Nations Championship	Wales	N/A	
4 February 1911	Inverleith	Scotland	Wales	10–32	1911 Five Nations Championship	Wales	N/A	
28 February 1911	Parc des Princes	France	Wales	0–15	1911 Five Nations Championship	Wales	N/A	
11 March 1911	Cardiff Arms Park/National Stadium	Wales	Ireland	16–0	1911 Five Nations Championship	Wales	N/A	
20 January 1912	Twickenham Stadium	England	Wales	8–0	1912 Five Nations Championship	England	N/A	
3 February 1912	St. Helen's	Wales	Scotland	21–6	1912 Five Nations Championship	Wales	N/A	
9 March 1912	Balmoral Showgrounds	Ireland	Wales	12–5	1912 Five Nations Championship	Ireland	N/A	
25 March 1912	Rodney Parade	Wales	France	14–8	1912 Five Nations Championship	Wales	N/A	
14 December 1912	Cardiff Arms Park/National Stadium	Wales	South Africa	0–3	1912–13 tour of Europe	South Africa	N/A	
18 January 1913	Cardiff Arms Park/National Stadium	Wales	England	0–12	1913 Five Nations Championship	England	N/A	
1 February 1913	Inverleith	Scotland	Wales	0–8	1913 Five Nations Championship	Wales	N/A	
27 February 1913	Parc des Princes	France	Wales	8–11	1913 Five Nations Championship	Wales	N/A	
8 March 1913	St. Helen's	Wales	Ireland	16–13	1913 Five Nations Championship	Wales	N/A	
17 January 1914	Twickenham Stadium	England	Wales	10–9	1914 Five Nations Championship	England	N/A	
7 February 1914	Cardiff Arms Park/National Stadium	Wales	Scotland	24–5	1914 Five Nations Championship	Wales	N/A	
2 March 1914	St. Helen's	Wales	France	31–0	1914 Five Nations Championship	Wales	N/A	
14 March 1914	Balmoral Showgrounds	Ireland	Wales	3–11	1914 Five Nations Championship	Wales	N/A	
21 April 1919	St. Helen's	Wales	New Zealand Services	3–6	New Zealand Army rugby team of 1919	New Zealand Services (1)	N/A	
17 January 1920	St. Helen's	Wales	England	19–5	1920 Five Nations Championship	Wales	N/A	
7 February 1920	Inverleith	Scotland	Wales	9–5	1920 Five Nations Championship	Scotland	N/A	
17 February 1920	Colombes	France	Wales	5–6	1920 Five Nations Championship	Wales	N/A	
13 March 1920	Cardiff Arms Park/National Stadium	Wales	Ireland	28–4	1920 Five Nations Championship	Wales	N/A	
15 January 1921	Twickenham Stadium	England	Wales	18–3	1921 Five Nations Championship	England	N/A	
5 February 1921	St. Helen's	Wales	Scotland	8–14	1921 Five Nations Championship	Scotland	N/A	
26 February 1921	Cardiff Arms Park/National Stadium	Wales	France	12–4	1921 Five Nations Championship	Wales	N/A	
12 March 1921	Balmoral Showgrounds	Ireland	Wales	0–6	1921 Five Nations Championship	Wales	N/A	
21 January 1922	Cardiff Arms Park/National Stadium	Wales	England	28–6	1922 Five Nations Championship	Wales	N/A	
4 February 1922	Inverleith	Scotland	Wales	9–9	1922 Five Nations Championship	Draw	N/A	
11 March 1922	St. Helen's	Wales	Ireland	11–5	1922 Five Nations Championship	Wales	N/A	
23 March 1922	Colombes	France	Wales	3–11	1922 Five Nations Championship	Wales	N/A	
20 January 1923	Twickenham Stadium	England	Wales	7–3	1923 Five Nations Championship	England	N/A	
3 February 1923	Cardiff Arms Park/National Stadium	Wales	Scotland	8–11	1923 Five Nations Championship	Scotland	N/A	
24 February 1923	St. Helen's	Wales	France	16–8	1923 Five Nations Championship	Wales	N/A	
10 March 1923	Lansdowne Road	Ireland	Wales	5–4	1923 Five Nations Championship	Ireland	N/A	
19 January 1924	St. Helen's	Wales	England	9–17	1924 Five Nations Championship	England	N/A	
2 February 1924	Inverleith	Scotland	Wales	35–10	1924 Five Nations Championship	Scotland	N/A	
8 March 1924	Cardiff Arms Park/National Stadium	Wales	Ireland	10–13	1924 Five Nations Championship	Ireland	N/A	
27 March 1924	Colombes	France	Wales	6–10	1924 Five Nations Championship	Wales	N/A	
29 November 1924	St. Helen's	Wales	New Zealand	0–19	1924–25 tour of Europe	New Zealand	N/A	
17 January 1925	Twickenham Stadium	England	Wales	12–6	1925 Five Nations Championship	England	N/A	
7 February 1925	St. Helen's	Wales	Scotland	14–24	1925 Five Nations Championship	Scotland	N/A	
28 February 1925	Cardiff Arms Park/National Stadium	Wales	France	11–5	1925 Five Nations Championship	Wales	N/A	
14 March 1925	Ravenhill Stadium	Ireland	Wales	19–3	1925 Five Nations Championship	Ireland	N/A	
16 January 1926	Cardiff Arms Park/National Stadium	Wales	England	3–3	1926 Five Nations Championship	Draw	N/A	
6 February 1926	Murrayfield Stadium	Scotland	Wales	8–5	1926 Five Nations Championship	Scotland	N/A	
13 March 1926	St. Helen's	Wales	Ireland	11–8	1926 Five Nations Championship	Wales	N/A	
5 April 1926	Colombes	France	Wales	5–7	1926 Five Nations Championship	Wales	N/A	
15 January 1927	Twickenham Stadium	England	Wales	11–9	1927 Five Nations Championship	England	N/A	
5 February 1927	Cardiff Arms Park/National Stadium	Wales	Scotland	0–5	1927 Five Nations Championship	Scotland	N/A	
26 February 1927	St. Helen's	Wales	France	25–7	1927 Five Nations Championship	Wales	N/A	
12 March 1927	Lansdowne Road	Ireland	Wales	19–9	1927 Five Nations Championship	Ireland	N/A	
26 November 1927	Cardiff Arms Park/National Stadium	Wales	Australia	8–18	1927–28 Waratahs tour	Australia	N/A	
21 January 1928	St. Helen's	Wales	England	8–10	1928 Five Nations Championship	England	N/A	
4 February 1928	Murrayfield Stadium	Scotland	Wales	0–13	1928 Five Nations Championship	Wales	N/A	
10 March 1928	Cardiff Arms Park/National Stadium	Wales	Ireland	10–13	1928 Five Nations Championship	Ireland	N/A	
9 April 1928	Colombes	France	Wales	8–3	1928 Five Nations Championship	France	N/A	
19 January 1929	Twickenham Stadium	England	Wales	8–3	1929 Five Nations Championship	England	N/A	
2 February 1929	St. Helen's	Wales	Scotland	14–7	1929 Five Nations Championship	Wales	N/A	
23 February 1929	Cardiff Arms Park/National Stadium	Wales	France	8–3	1929 Five Nations Championship	Wales	N/A	
9 March 1929	Ravenhill Stadium	Ireland	Wales	5–5	1929 Five Nations Championship	Draw	N/A	
18 January 1930	Cardiff Arms Park/National Stadium	Wales	England	3–11	1930 Five Nations Championship	England	N/A	
1 February 1930	Murrayfield Stadium	Scotland	Wales	12–9	1930 Five Nations Championship	Scotland	N/A	
8 March 1930	St. Helen's	Wales	Ireland	12–7	1930 Five Nations Championship	Wales	N/A	
21 April 1930	Colombes	France	Wales	0–11	1930 Five Nations Championship	Wales	N/A	
17 January 1931	Twickenham Stadium	England	Wales	11–11	1931 Five Nations Championship	Draw	N/A	
7 February 1931	Cardiff Arms Park/National Stadium	Wales	Scotland	13–8	1931 Five Nations Championship	Wales	N/A	
28 February 1931	St. Helen's	Wales	France	35–3	1931 Five Nations Championship	Wales	N/A	
14 March 1931	Ravenhill Stadium	Ireland	Wales	3–15	1931 Five Nations Championship	Wales	N/A	
5 December 1931	St. Helen's	Wales	South Africa	3–8	1931–32 tour of Britain and Ireland	South Africa	N/A	
16 January 1932	St. Helen's	Wales	England	12–5	1932 Home Nations Championship	Wales	N/A	
6 February 1932	Murrayfield Stadium	Scotland	Wales	0–6	1932 Home Nations Championship	Wales	N/A	
12 March 1932	Cardiff Arms Park/National Stadium	Wales	Ireland	10–12	1932 Home Nations Championship	Ireland	N/A	
21 January 1933	Twickenham Stadium	England	Wales	3–7	1933 Home Nations Championship	Wales	N/A	
4 February 1933	St. Helen's	Wales	Scotland	3–11	1933 Home Nations Championship	Scotland	N/A	
11 March 1933	Ravenhill Stadium	Ireland	Wales	10–5	1933 Home Nations Championship	Ireland	N/A	
20 January 1934	Cardiff Arms Park/National Stadium	Wales	England	0–9	1934 Home Nations Championship	England	N/A	
3 February 1934	Murrayfield Stadium	Scotland	Wales	6–13	1934 Home Nations Championship	Wales	N/A	
10 March 1934	St. Helen's	Wales	Ireland	13–0	1934 Home Nations Championship	Wales	N/A	
19 January 1935	Twickenham Stadium	England	Wales	3–3	1935 Home Nations Championship	Draw	N/A	
2 February 1935	Cardiff Arms Park/National Stadium	Wales	Scotland	10–6	1935 Home Nations Championship	Wales	N/A	
9 March 1935	Ravenhill Stadium	Ireland	Wales	9–3	1935 Home Nations Championship	Ireland	N/A	
21 December 1935	Cardiff Arms Park/National Stadium	Wales	New Zealand	13–12	1935–36 tour	Wales	N/A	
18 January 1936	St. Helen's	Wales	England	0–0	1936 Home Nations Championship	Draw	N/A	
1 February 1936	Murrayfield Stadium	Scotland	Wales	3–13	1936 Home Nations Championship	Wales	N/A	
14 March 1936	Cardiff Arms Park/National Stadium	Wales	Ireland	3–0	1936 Home Nations Championship	Wales	N/A	
16 January 1937	Twickenham Stadium	England	Wales	4–3	1937 Home Nations Championship	England	N/A	
6 February 1937	St. Helen's	Wales	Scotland	6–13	1937 Home Nations Championship	Scotland	N/A	
3 April 1937	Ravenhill Stadium	Ireland	Wales	5–3	1937 Home Nations Championship	Ireland	N/A	
15 January 1938	Cardiff Arms Park/National Stadium	Wales	England	14–8	1938 Home Nations Championship	Wales	N/A	
5 February 1938	Murrayfield Stadium	Scotland	Wales	8–6	1938 Home Nations Championship	Scotland	N/A	
12 March 1938	St. Helen's	Wales	Ireland	11–5	1938 Home Nations Championship	Wales	N/A	
21 January 1939	Twickenham Stadium	England	Wales	3–0	1939 Home Nations Championship	England	N/A	
4 February 1939	Cardiff Arms Park/National Stadium	Wales	Scotland	11–3	1939 Home Nations Championship	Wales	N/A	
11 March 1939	Ravenhill Stadium	Ireland	Wales	0–7	1939 Home Nations Championship	Wales	N/A	
18 January 1947	Cardiff Arms Park/National Stadium	Wales	England	6–9	1947 Five Nations Championship	England	N/A	
1 February 1947	Murrayfield Stadium	Scotland	Wales	8–22	1947 Five Nations Championship	Wales	N/A	
22 March 1947	Colombes	France	Wales	0–3	1947 Five Nations Championship	Wales	N/A	
29 March 1947	St. Helen's	Wales	Ireland	6–0	1947 Five Nations Championship	Wales	N/A	
20 December 1947	Cardiff Arms Park/National Stadium	Wales	Australia	6–0	1947–48 tour	Wales	N/A	
17 January 1948	Twickenham Stadium	England	Wales	3–3	1948 Five Nations Championship	Draw	N/A	
7 February 1948	Cardiff Arms Park/National Stadium	Wales	Scotland	14–0	1948 Five Nations Championship	Wales	N/A	
21 February 1948	St. Helen's	Wales	France	3–11	1948 Five Nations Championship	France	N/A	
13 March 1948	Ravenhill Stadium	Ireland	Wales	6–3	1948 Five Nations Championship	Ireland	N/A	
15 January 1949	Cardiff Arms Park/National Stadium	Wales	England	9–3	1949 Five Nations Championship	Wales	N/A	
5 February 1949	Murrayfield Stadium	Scotland	Wales	6–5	1949 Five Nations Championship	Scotland	N/A	
12 March 1949	St. Helen's	Wales	Ireland	0–5	1949 Five Nations Championship	Ireland	N/A	
26 March 1949	Colombes	France	Wales	5–3	1949 Five Nations Championship	France	N/A	
21 January 1950	Twickenham Stadium	England	Wales	5–11	1950 Five Nations Championship	Wales	N/A	
4 February 1950	St. Helen's	Wales	Scotland	12–0	1950 Five Nations Championship	Wales	N/A	
11 March 1950	Ravenhill Stadium	Ireland	Wales	3–6	1950 Five Nations Championship	Wales	N/A	
25 March 1950	Cardiff Arms Park/National Stadium	Wales	France	21–0	1950 Five Nations Championship	Wales	N/A	
20 January 1951	St. Helen's	Wales	England	23–5	1951 Five Nations Championship	Wales	N/A	
3 February 1951	Murrayfield Stadium	Scotland	Wales	19–0	1951 Five Nations Championship	Scotland	N/A	
10 March 1951	Cardiff Arms Park/National Stadium	Wales	Ireland	3–3	1951 Five Nations Championship	Draw	N/A	
7 April 1951	Colombes	France	Wales	8–3	1951 Five Nations Championship	France	N/A	
22 December 1951	Cardiff Arms Park/National Stadium	Wales	South Africa	3–6	1951–52 tour of Europe	South Africa	N/A	
19 January 1952	Twickenham Stadium	England	Wales	6–8	1952 Five Nations Championship	Wales	N/A	
2 February 1952	Cardiff Arms Park/National Stadium	Wales	Scotland	11–0	1952 Five Nations Championship	Wales	N/A	
8 March 1952	Lansdowne Road	Ireland	Wales	3–14	1952 Five Nations Championship	Wales	N/A	
22 March 1952	St. Helen's	Wales	France	9–5	1952 Five Nations Championship	Wales	N/A	
17 January 1953	Cardiff Arms Park/National Stadium	Wales	England	3–8	1953 Five Nations Championship	England	N/A	
7 February 1953	Murrayfield Stadium	Scotland	Wales	0–12	1953 Five Nations Championship	Wales	N/A	
14 March 1953	St. Helen's	Wales	Ireland	5–3	1953 Five Nations Championship	Wales	N/A	
28 March 1953	Colombes	France	Wales	3–6	1953 Five Nations Championship	Wales	N/A	
19 December 1953	Cardiff Arms Park/National Stadium	Wales	New Zealand	13–8	1953–54 tour	Wales	N/A	
16 January 1954	Twickenham Stadium	England	Wales	9–6	1954 Five Nations Championship	England	N/A	
13 March 1954	Lansdowne Road	Ireland	Wales	9–12	1954 Five Nations Championship	Wales	N/A	
27 March 1954	Cardiff Arms Park/National Stadium	Wales	France	19–13	1954 Five Nations Championship	Wales	N/A	
10 April 1954	St. Helen's	Wales	Scotland	15–3	1954 Five Nations Championship	Wales	N/A	
22 January 1955	Cardiff Arms Park/National Stadium	Wales	England	3–0	1955 Five Nations Championship	Wales	N/A	
5 February 1955	Murrayfield Stadium	Scotland	Wales	14–8	1955 Five Nations Championship	Scotland	N/A	
12 March 1955	Cardiff Arms Park/National Stadium	Wales	Ireland	21–3	1955 Five Nations Championship	Wales	N/A	
26 March 1955	Colombes	France	Wales	11–16	1955 Five Nations Championship	Wales	N/A	
21 January 1956	Twickenham Stadium	England	Wales	3–8	1956 Five Nations Championship	Wales	N/A	
4 February 1956	Cardiff Arms Park/National Stadium	Wales	Scotland	9–3	1956 Five Nations Championship	Wales	N/A	
10 March 1956	Lansdowne Road	Ireland	Wales	11–3	1956 Five Nations Championship	Ireland	N/A	
24 March 1956	Cardiff Arms Park/National Stadium	Wales	France	5–3	1956 Five Nations Championship	Wales	N/A	
19 January 1957	Cardiff Arms Park/National Stadium	Wales	England	0–3	1957 Five Nations Championship	England	N/A	
2 February 1957	Murrayfield Stadium	Scotland	Wales	9–6	1957 Five Nations Championship	Scotland	N/A	
9 March 1957	Cardiff Arms Park/National Stadium	Wales	Ireland	6–5	1957 Five Nations Championship	Wales	N/A	
23 March 1957	Colombes	France	Wales	13–19	1957 Five Nations Championship	Wales	N/A	
4 January 1958	Cardiff Arms Park/National Stadium	Wales	Australia	9–3	1957–58 tour	Wales	N/A	
18 January 1958	Twickenham Stadium	England	Wales	3–3	1958 Five Nations Championship	Draw	N/A	
1 February 1958	Cardiff Arms Park/National Stadium	Wales	Scotland	8–3	1958 Five Nations Championship	Wales	N/A	
15 March 1958	Lansdowne Road	Ireland	Wales	6–9	1958 Five Nations Championship	Wales	N/A	
29 March 1958	Cardiff Arms Park/National Stadium	Wales	France	6–16	1958 Five Nations Championship	France	N/A	
17 January 1959	Cardiff Arms Park/National Stadium	Wales	England	5–0	1959 Five Nations Championship	Wales	N/A	
7 February 1959	Murrayfield Stadium	Scotland	Wales	6–5	1959 Five Nations Championship	Scotland	N/A	
14 March 1959	Cardiff Arms Park/National Stadium	Wales	Ireland	8–6	1959 Five Nations Championship	Wales	N/A	
4 April 1959	Colombes	France	Wales	11–3	1959 Five Nations Championship	France	N/A	
16 January 1960	Twickenham Stadium	England	Wales	14–6	1960 Five Nations Championship	England	N/A	
6 February 1960	Cardiff Arms Park/National Stadium	Wales	Scotland	8–0	1960 Five Nations Championship	Wales	N/A	
12 March 1960	Lansdowne Road	Ireland	Wales	9–10	1960 Five Nations Championship	Wales	N/A	
26 March 1960	Cardiff Arms Park/National Stadium	Wales	France	8–16	1960 Five Nations Championship	France	N/A	
3 December 1960	Cardiff Arms Park/National Stadium	Wales	South Africa	0–3	1960–61 tour of Europe	South Africa	N/A	
21 January 1961	Cardiff Arms Park/National Stadium	Wales	England	6–3	1961 Five Nations Championship	Wales	N/A	
11 February 1961	Murrayfield Stadium	Scotland	Wales	3–0	1961 Five Nations Championship	Scotland	N/A	
11 March 1961	Cardiff Arms Park/National Stadium	Wales	Ireland	9–0	1961 Five Nations Championship	Wales	N/A	
25 March 1961	Colombes	France	Wales	8–6	1961 Five Nations Championship	France	N/A	
20 January 1962	Twickenham Stadium	England	Wales	0–0	1962 Five Nations Championship	Draw	N/A	
3 February 1962	Cardiff Arms Park/National Stadium	Wales	Scotland	3–8	1962 Five Nations Championship	Scotland	N/A	
24 March 1962	Cardiff Arms Park/National Stadium	Wales	France	3–0	1962 Five Nations Championship	Wales	N/A	
17 November 1962	Lansdowne Road	Ireland	Wales	3–3	1962 Five Nations Championship	Draw	N/A	
19 January 1963	Cardiff Arms Park/National Stadium	Wales	England	6–13	1963 Five Nations Championship	England	N/A	
2 February 1963	Murrayfield Stadium	Scotland	Wales	0–6	1963 Five Nations Championship	Wales	N/A	
9 March 1963	Cardiff Arms Park/National Stadium	Wales	Ireland	6–14	1963 Five Nations Championship	Ireland	N/A	
23 March 1963	Colombes	France	Wales	5–3	1963 Five Nations Championship	France	N/A	
12 December 1963	Cardiff Arms Park/National Stadium	Wales	New Zealand	0–6		New Zealand	N/A	
18 January 1964	Twickenham Stadium	England	Wales	6–6	1964 Five Nations Championship	Draw	N/A	
1 February 1964	Cardiff Arms Park/National Stadium	Wales	Scotland	11–3	1964 Five Nations Championship	Wales	N/A	
7 March 1964	Lansdowne Road	Ireland	Wales	6–15	1964 Five Nations Championship	Wales	N/A	
21 March 1964	Cardiff Arms Park/National Stadium	Wales	France	11–11	1964 Five Nations Championship	Draw	N/A	
23 May 1964	Kings Park Stadium	South Africa	Wales	24–3	1964 summer tour	South Africa	N/A	
16 January 1965	Cardiff Arms Park/National Stadium	Wales	England	14–3	1965 Five Nations Championship	Wales	N/A	
6 February 1965	Murrayfield Stadium	Scotland	Wales	12–14	1965 Five Nations Championship	Wales	N/A	
13 March 1965	Cardiff Arms Park/National Stadium	Wales	Ireland	14–8	1965 Five Nations Championship	Wales	N/A	
27 March 1965	Colombes	France	Wales	22–13	1965 Five Nations Championship	France	N/A	
15 January 1966	Twickenham Stadium	England	Wales	6–11	1966 Five Nations Championship	Wales	N/A	
5 February 1966	Cardiff Arms Park/National Stadium	Wales	Scotland	8–3	1966 Five Nations Championship	Wales	N/A	
12 March 1966	Lansdowne Road	Ireland	Wales	9–6	1966 Five Nations Championship	Ireland	N/A	
26 March 1966	Cardiff Arms Park/National Stadium	Wales	France	9–8	1966 Five Nations Championship	Wales	N/A	
3 December 1966	Cardiff Arms Park/National Stadium	Wales	Australia	11–14		Australia	N/A	
4 February 1967	Murrayfield Stadium	Scotland	Wales	11–5	1967 Five Nations Championship	Scotland	(Wales) David Nash	
11 March 1967	Cardiff Arms Park/National Stadium	Wales	Ireland	0–3	1967 Five Nations Championship	Ireland	(Wales) David Nash	
1 April 1967	Colombes	France	Wales	20–14	1967 Five Nations Championship	France	(Wales) David Nash	
15 April 1967	Cardiff Arms Park/National Stadium	Wales	England	34–21	1967 Five Nations Championship	Wales	(Wales) David Nash	
11 November 1967	Cardiff Arms Park/National Stadium	Wales	New Zealand	6–13		New Zealand	(Wales) David Nash	
20 January 1968	Twickenham Stadium	England	Wales	11–11	1968 Five Nations Championship	Draw	(Wales) Clive Rowlands	
3 February 1968	Cardiff Arms Park/National Stadium	Wales	Scotland	5–0	1968 Five Nations Championship	Wales	(Wales) Clive Rowlands	
9 March 1968	Lansdowne Road	Ireland	Wales	9–6	1968 Five Nations Championship	Ireland	(Wales) Clive Rowlands	
23 March 1968	Cardiff Arms Park/National Stadium	Wales	France	9–14	1968 Five Nations Championship	France	(Wales) Clive Rowlands	
1 February 1969	Murrayfield Stadium	Scotland	Wales	3–17	1969 Five Nations Championship	Wales	(Wales) Clive Rowlands	
8 March 1969	Cardiff Arms Park/National Stadium	Wales	Ireland	24–11	1969 Five Nations Championship	Wales	(Wales) Clive Rowlands	
22 March 1969	Colombes	France	Wales	8–8	1969 Five Nations Championship	Draw	(Wales) Clive Rowlands	
12 April 1969	Cardiff Arms Park/National Stadium	Wales	England	30–9	1969 Five Nations Championship	Wales	(Wales) Clive Rowlands	
31 May 1969	Lancaster Park	New Zealand	Wales	19–0	1969 summer tour	New Zealand	(Wales) Clive Rowlands	
14 June 1969	Eden Park	New Zealand	Wales	33–12	1969 summer tour	New Zealand	(Wales) Clive Rowlands	
21 June 1969	Sydney Cricket Ground	Australia	Wales	16–19	1969 summer tour	Wales	(Wales) Clive Rowlands	
24 January 1970	Cardiff Arms Park/National Stadium	Wales	South Africa	6–6		Draw	(Wales) Clive Rowlands	
7 February 1970	Cardiff Arms Park/National Stadium	Wales	Scotland	18–9	1970 Five Nations Championship	Wales	(Wales) Clive Rowlands	
28 February 1970	Twickenham Stadium	England	Wales	13–17	1970 Five Nations Championship	Wales	(Wales) Clive Rowlands	
14 March 1970	Lansdowne Road	Ireland	Wales	14–0	1970 Five Nations Championship	Ireland	(Wales) Clive Rowlands	
4 April 1970	Cardiff Arms Park/National Stadium	Wales	France	11–6	1970 Five Nations Championship	Wales	(Wales) Clive Rowlands	
16 January 1971	Cardiff Arms Park/National Stadium	Wales	England	22–6	1971 Five Nations Championship	Wales	(Wales) Clive Rowlands	
6 February 1971	Murrayfield Stadium	Scotland	Wales	18–19	1971 Five Nations Championship	Wales	(Wales) Clive Rowlands	
13 March 1971	Cardiff Arms Park/National Stadium	Wales	Ireland	23–9	1971 Five Nations Championship	Wales	(Wales) Clive Rowlands	
27 March 1971	Stade Olympique Yves-du-Manoir/Colombes	France	Wales	5–9	1971 Five Nations Championship	Wales	(Wales) Clive Rowlands	
15 January 1972	Twickenham Stadium	England	Wales	3–12	1972 Five Nations Championship	Wales	(Wales) Clive Rowlands	
5 February 1972	Cardiff Arms Park/National Stadium	Wales	Scotland	35–12	1972 Five Nations Championship	Wales	(Wales) Clive Rowlands	
25 March 1972	Cardiff Arms Park/National Stadium	Wales	France	20–6	1972 Five Nations Championship	Wales	(Wales) Clive Rowlands	
2 December 1972	Cardiff Arms Park/National Stadium	Wales	New Zealand	16–19		New Zealand	(Wales) Clive Rowlands	
20 January 1973	Cardiff Arms Park/National Stadium	Wales	England	25–9	1973 Five Nations Championship	Wales	(Wales) Clive Rowlands	
3 February 1973	Murrayfield Stadium	Scotland	Wales	10–9	1973 Five Nations Championship	Scotland	(Wales) Clive Rowlands	
10 March 1973	Cardiff Arms Park/National Stadium	Wales	Ireland	16–12	1973 Five Nations Championship	Wales	(Wales) Clive Rowlands	
24 March 1973	Parc des Princes	France	Wales	12–3	1973 Five Nations Championship	France	(Wales) Clive Rowlands	
10 November 1973	Cardiff Arms Park/National Stadium	Wales	Australia	24–0		Wales	(Wales) Clive Rowlands	
19 January 1974	Cardiff Arms Park/National Stadium	Wales	Scotland	6–0	1974 Five Nations Championship	Wales	(Wales) Clive Rowlands	
2 February 1974	Lansdowne Road	Ireland	Wales	9–9	1974 Five Nations Championship	Draw	(Wales) Clive Rowlands	
16 February 1974	Cardiff Arms Park/National Stadium	Wales	France	16–16	1974 Five Nations Championship	Draw	(Wales) Clive Rowlands	
16 March 1974	Twickenham Stadium	England	Wales	16–12	1974 Five Nations Championship	England	(Wales) Clive Rowlands	
18 January 1975	Parc des Princes	France	Wales	10–25	1975 Five Nations Championship	Wales	(Wales) John Dawes	
15 February 1975	Cardiff Arms Park/National Stadium	Wales	England	20–4	1975 Five Nations Championship	Wales	(Wales) John Dawes	
1 March 1975	Murrayfield Stadium	Scotland	Wales	12–10	1975 Five Nations Championship	Scotland	(Wales) John Dawes	
15 March 1975	Cardiff Arms Park/National Stadium	Wales	Ireland	32–4	1975 Five Nations Championship	Wales	(Wales) John Dawes	
20 December 1975	Cardiff Arms Park/National Stadium	Wales	Australia	28–3		Wales	(Wales) John Dawes	
17 January 1976	Twickenham Stadium	England	Wales	9–21	1976 Five Nations Championship	Wales	(Wales) John Dawes	
7 February 1976	Cardiff Arms Park/National Stadium	Wales	Scotland	28–6	1976 Five Nations Championship	Wales	(Wales) John Dawes	
21 February 1976	Lansdowne Road	Ireland	Wales	9–34	1976 Five Nations Championship	Wales	(Wales) John Dawes	
6 March 1976	Cardiff Arms Park/National Stadium	Wales	France	19–13	1976 Five Nations Championship	Wales	(Wales) John Dawes	
15 January 1977	Cardiff Arms Park/National Stadium	Wales	Ireland	25–9	1977 Five Nations Championship	Wales	(Wales) John Dawes	
5 February 1977	Parc des Princes	France	Wales	16–9	1977 Five Nations Championship	France	(Wales) John Dawes	
5 March 1977	Cardiff Arms Park/National Stadium	Wales	England	14–9	1977 Five Nations Championship	Wales	(Wales) John Dawes	
19 March 1977	Murrayfield Stadium	Scotland	Wales	9–18	1977 Five Nations Championship	Wales	(Wales) John Dawes	
4 February 1978	Twickenham Stadium	England	Wales	6–9	1978 Five Nations Championship	Wales	(Wales) John Dawes	
18 February 1978	Cardiff Arms Park/National Stadium	Wales	Scotland	22–14	1978 Five Nations Championship	Wales	(Wales) John Dawes	
4 March 1978	Lansdowne Road	Ireland	Wales	16–20	1978 Five Nations Championship	Wales	(Wales) John Dawes	
18 March 1978	Cardiff Arms Park/National Stadium	Wales	France	16–7	1978 Five Nations Championship	Wales	(Wales) John Dawes	
11 June 1978	Ballymore Stadium	Australia	Wales	18–8	1978 summer tour	Australia	(Wales) John Dawes	
17 June 1978	Sydney Cricket Ground	Australia	Wales	19–17	1978 summer tour	Australia	(Wales) John Dawes	
11 November 1978	Cardiff Arms Park/National Stadium	Wales	New Zealand	12–13		New Zealand	(Wales) John Dawes	
20 January 1979	Murrayfield Stadium	Scotland	Wales	13–19	1979 Five Nations Championship	Wales	(Wales) John Dawes	
3 February 1979	Cardiff Arms Park/National Stadium	Wales	Ireland	24–21	1979 Five Nations Championship	Wales	(Wales) John Dawes	
17 February 1979	Parc des Princes	France	Wales	14–13	1979 Five Nations Championship	France	(Wales) John Dawes	
17 March 1979	Cardiff Arms Park/National Stadium	Wales	England	27–3	1979 Five Nations Championship	Wales	(Wales) John Dawes	
19 January 1980	Cardiff Arms Park/National Stadium	Wales	France	18–9	1980 Five Nations Championship	Wales	(Wales) John Lloyd	
16 February 1980	Twickenham Stadium	England	Wales	9–8	1980 Five Nations Championship	England	(Wales) John Lloyd	
1 March 1980	Cardiff Arms Park/National Stadium	Wales	Scotland	17–6	1980 Five Nations Championship	Wales	(Wales) John Lloyd	
15 March 1980	Lansdowne Road	Ireland	Wales	21–7	1980 Five Nations Championship	Ireland	(Wales) John Lloyd	
1 November 1980	Cardiff Arms Park/National Stadium	Wales	New Zealand	3–23		New Zealand	(Wales) John Lloyd	
17 January 1981	Cardiff Arms Park/National Stadium	Wales	England	21–19	1981 Five Nations Championship	Wales	(Wales) John Lloyd	
7 February 1981	Murrayfield Stadium	Scotland	Wales	15–6	1981 Five Nations Championship	Scotland	(Wales) John Lloyd	
21 February 1981	Cardiff Arms Park/National Stadium	Wales	Ireland	9–8	1981 Five Nations Championship	Wales	(Wales) John Lloyd	
7 March 1981	Parc des Princes	France	Wales	19–15	1981 Five Nations Championship	France	(Wales) John Lloyd	
5 December 1981	Cardiff Arms Park/National Stadium	Wales	Australia	18–13		Wales	(Wales) John Lloyd	
23 January 1982	Lansdowne Road	Ireland	Wales	20–12	1982 Five Nations Championship	Ireland	(Wales) John Lloyd	
6 February 1982	Cardiff Arms Park/National Stadium	Wales	France	22–12	1982 Five Nations Championship	Wales	(Wales) John Lloyd	
6 March 1982	Twickenham Stadium	England	Wales	17–7	1982 Five Nations Championship	England	(Wales) John Lloyd	
20 March 1982	Cardiff Arms Park/National Stadium	Wales	Scotland	18–34	1982 Five Nations Championship	Scotland	(Wales) John Lloyd	
5 February 1983	Cardiff Arms Park/National Stadium	Wales	England	13–13	1983 Five Nations Championship	Draw	(Wales) John Bevan	
19 February 1983	Murrayfield Stadium	Scotland	Wales	15–19	1983 Five Nations Championship	Wales	(Wales) John Bevan	
5 March 1983	Cardiff Arms Park/National Stadium	Wales	Ireland	23–9	1983 Five Nations Championship	Wales	(Wales) John Bevan	
19 March 1983	Parc des Princes	France	Wales	16–9	1983 Five Nations Championship	France	(Wales) John Bevan	
12 November 1983	Dinamo Stadium	Romania	Wales	24–6		Romania	(Wales) John Bevan	
21 January 1984	Cardiff Arms Park/National Stadium	Wales	Scotland	9–15	1984 Five Nations Championship	Scotland	(Wales) John Bevan	
4 February 1984	Lansdowne Road	Ireland	Wales	9–18	1984 Five Nations Championship	Wales	(Wales) John Bevan	
18 February 1984	Cardiff Arms Park/National Stadium	Wales	France	16–21	1984 Five Nations Championship	France	(Wales) John Bevan	
17 March 1984	Twickenham Stadium	England	Wales	15–24	1984 Five Nations Championship	Wales	(Wales) John Bevan	
24 November 1984	Cardiff Arms Park/National Stadium	Wales	Australia	9–28		Australia	(Wales) John Bevan	
2 March 1985	Murrayfield Stadium	Scotland	Wales	21–25	1985 Five Nations Championship	Wales	(Wales) John Bevan	
16 March 1985	Cardiff Arms Park/National Stadium	Wales	Ireland	9–21	1985 Five Nations Championship	Ireland	(Wales) John Bevan	
30 March 1985	Parc des Princes	France	Wales	14–3	1985 Five Nations Championship	France	(Wales) John Bevan	
20 April 1985	Cardiff Arms Park/National Stadium	Wales	England	24–15	1985 Five Nations Championship	Wales	(Wales) John Bevan	
9 November 1985	Cardiff Arms Park/National Stadium	Wales	Fiji	40–3		Wales	(Wales) John Bevan	
18 January 1986	Twickenham Stadium	England	Wales	21–18	1986 Five Nations Championship	England	(Wales) Tony Gray	
1 February 1986	Cardiff Arms Park/National Stadium	Wales	Scotland	22–15	1986 Five Nations Championship	Wales	(Wales) Tony Gray	
15 February 1986	Lansdowne Road	Ireland	Wales	12–19	1986 Five Nations Championship	Wales	(Wales) Tony Gray	
1 March 1986	Cardiff Arms Park/National Stadium	Wales	France	15–23	1986 Five Nations Championship	France	(Wales) Tony Gray	
31 May 1986	Buckhurst Park	Fiji	Wales	15–22	1986 summer tour	Wales	(Wales) Tony Gray	
12 June 1986	Teufaiva Sport Stadium	Tonga	Wales	7–15	1986 summer tour	Wales	(Wales) Tony Gray	
14 June 1986	Apia Park	Samoa	Wales	14–32	1986 summer tour	Wales	(Wales) Tony Gray	
7 February 1987	Parc des Princes	France	Wales	16–9	1987 Five Nations Championship	France	(Wales) Tony Gray	
7 March 1987	Cardiff Arms Park/National Stadium	Wales	England	19–12	1987 Five Nations Championship	Wales	(Wales) Tony Gray	
21 March 1987	Murrayfield Stadium	Scotland	Wales	21–15	1987 Five Nations Championship	Scotland	(Wales) Tony Gray	
4 April 1987	Cardiff Arms Park/National Stadium	Wales	Ireland	11–15	1987 Five Nations Championship	Ireland	(Wales) Tony Gray	
25 May 1987	Athletic Park	Ireland	Wales	6–13	1987 Rugby World Cup	Wales	(Wales) Tony Gray	
29 May 1987	Showgrounds Oval	Tonga	Wales	16–29	1987 Rugby World Cup	Wales	(Wales) Tony Gray	
3 June 1987	Rugby Park Stadium	Canada	Wales	9–40	1987 Rugby World Cup	Wales	(Wales) Tony Gray	
8 June 1987	Ballymore Stadium	England	Wales	3–16	1987 Rugby World Cup	Wales	(Wales) Tony Gray	
14 June 1987	Ballymore Stadium	New Zealand	Wales	49–6	1987 Rugby World Cup	New Zealand	(Wales) Tony Gray	
18 June 1987	Rotorua International Stadium	Australia	Wales	21–22	1987 Rugby World Cup	Wales	(Wales) Tony Gray	
7 November 1987	Cardiff Arms Park/National Stadium	Wales	United States	46–0		Wales	(Wales) Tony Gray	
6 February 1988	Twickenham Stadium	England	Wales	3–11	1988 Five Nations Championship	Wales	(Wales) Tony Gray	
20 February 1988	Cardiff Arms Park/National Stadium	Wales	Scotland	25–20	1988 Five Nations Championship	Wales	(Wales) Tony Gray	
5 March 1988	Lansdowne Road	Ireland	Wales	9–12	1988 Five Nations Championship	Wales	(Wales) Tony Gray	
19 March 1988	Cardiff Arms Park/National Stadium	Wales	France	9–10	1988 Five Nations Championship	France	(Wales) Tony Gray	
28 May 1988	Lancaster Park	New Zealand	Wales	52–3	1988 summer tour	New Zealand	(Wales) Tony Gray	
11 June 1988	Eden Park	New Zealand	Wales	54–9	1988 summer tour	New Zealand	(Wales) Tony Gray	
12 November 1988	Cardiff Arms Park/National Stadium	Wales	Samoa	24–6	1988 Autumn Internationals	Wales	(Wales) John Ryan	
10 December 1988	Cardiff Arms Park/National Stadium	Wales	Romania	9–15	1988 Autumn Internationals	Romania	(Wales) John Ryan	
21 January 1989	Murrayfield Stadium	Scotland	Wales	23–7	1989 Five Nations Championship	Scotland	(Wales) John Ryan	
4 February 1989	Cardiff Arms Park/National Stadium	Wales	Ireland	13–19	1989 Five Nations Championship	Ireland	(Wales) John Ryan	
18 February 1989	Parc des Princes	France	Wales	31–12	1989 Five Nations Championship	France	(Wales) John Ryan	
18 March 1989	Cardiff Arms Park/National Stadium	Wales	England	12–9	1989 Five Nations Championship	Wales	(Wales) John Ryan	
4 November 1989	Cardiff Arms Park/National Stadium	Wales	New Zealand	9–34		New Zealand	(Wales) John Ryan	
20 January 1990	Cardiff Arms Park/National Stadium	Wales	France	19–29	1990 Five Nations Championship	France	(Wales) John Ryan	
17 February 1990	Twickenham Stadium	England	Wales	34–6	1990 Five Nations Championship	England	(Wales) John Ryan	
3 March 1990	Cardiff Arms Park/National Stadium	Wales	Scotland	9–13	1990 Five Nations Championship	Scotland	(Wales) Ron Waldron	
24 March 1990	Lansdowne Road	Ireland	Wales	14–8	1990 Five Nations Championship	Ireland	(Wales) Ron Waldron	
2 June 1990	S. W. Stadium	Namibia	Wales	9–18	1990 summer tour	Wales	(Wales) Ron Waldron	
9 June 1990	S. W. Stadium	Namibia	Wales	30–34	1990 summer tour	Wales	(Wales) Ron Waldron	
6 October 1990	Cardiff Arms Park/National Stadium	Wales	Barbarians	24–31		Barbarians	(Wales) Ron Waldron	
19 January 1991	Cardiff Arms Park/National Stadium	Wales	England	6–25	1991 Five Nations Championship	England	(Wales) Ron Waldron	
2 February 1991	Murrayfield Stadium	Scotland	Wales	32–12	1991 Five Nations Championship	Scotland	(Wales) Ron Waldron	
16 February 1991	Cardiff Arms Park/National Stadium	Wales	Ireland	21–21	1991 Five Nations Championship	Draw	(Wales) Ron Waldron	
2 March 1991	Parc des Princes	France	Wales	36–3	1991 Five Nations Championship	France	(Wales) Ron Waldron	
22 July 1991	Ballymore Stadium	Australia	Wales	63–6		Australia	(Wales) Ron Waldron	
4 September 1991	Cardiff Arms Park/National Stadium	Wales	France	9–22		France	(Wales) Alan Davies	
6 October 1991	Cardiff Arms Park/National Stadium	Wales	Samoa	13–16	1991 Rugby World Cup	Samoa	(Wales) Alan Davies	
9 October 1991	Cardiff Arms Park/National Stadium	Wales	Argentina	16–7	1991 Rugby World Cup	Wales	(Wales) Alan Davies	
12 October 1991	Cardiff Arms Park/National Stadium	Wales	Australia	3–38	1991 Rugby World Cup	Australia	(Wales) Alan Davies	
18 January 1992	Lansdowne Road	Ireland	Wales	15–16	1992 Five Nations Championship	Wales	(Wales) Alan Davies	
1 February 1992	Cardiff Arms Park/National Stadium	Wales	France	9–12	1992 Five Nations Championship	France	(Wales) Alan Davies	
7 March 1992	Twickenham Stadium	England	Wales	24–0	1992 Five Nations Championship	England	(Wales) Alan Davies	
21 March 1992	Cardiff Arms Park/National Stadium	Wales	Scotland	15–12	1992 Five Nations Championship	Wales	(Wales) Alan Davies	
21 November 1992	Cardiff Arms Park/National Stadium	Wales	Australia	6–23		Australia	(Wales) Alan Davies	
6 February 1993	Cardiff Arms Park/National Stadium	Wales	England	10–9	1993 Five Nations Championship	Wales	(Wales) Alan Davies	
20 February 1993	Murrayfield Stadium	Scotland	Wales	20–0	1993 Five Nations Championship	Scotland	(Wales) Alan Davies	
6 March 1993	Cardiff Arms Park/National Stadium	Wales	Ireland	14–19	1993 Five Nations Championship	Ireland	(Wales) Alan Davies	
20 March 1993	Parc des Princes	France	Wales	26–10	1993 Five Nations Championship	France	(Wales) Alan Davies	
22 May 1993	Hartsfield	Zimbabwe	Wales	14–35	1993 summer tour	Wales	(Wales) Alan Davies	
29 May 1993	Police Grounds	Zimbabwe	Wales	13–42	1993 summer tour	Wales	(Wales) Alan Davies	
5 June 1993	S. W. Stadium	Namibia	Wales	23–38	1993 summer tour	Wales	(Wales) Alan Davies	
16 October 1993	Cardiff Arms Park/National Stadium	Wales	Japan	55–5	1993 Autumn Internationals	Wales	(Wales) Alan Davies	
10 November 1993	Cardiff Arms Park/National Stadium	Wales	Canada	24–26	1993 Autumn Internationals	Canada	(Wales) Alan Davies	
15 January 1994	Cardiff Arms Park/National Stadium	Wales	Scotland	29–6	1994 Five Nations Championship	Wales	(Wales) Alan Davies	
5 February 1994	Lansdowne Road	Ireland	Wales	15–17	1994 Five Nations Championship	Wales	(Wales) Alan Davies	
19 February 1994	Cardiff Arms Park/National Stadium	Wales	France	24–15	1994 Five Nations Championship	Wales	(Wales) Alan Davies	
19 March 1994	Twickenham Stadium	England	Wales	15–8	1994 Five Nations Championship	England	(Wales) Alan Davies	
18 May 1994	Universitario Lisboa	Portugal	Wales	11–102		Wales	(Wales) Alan Davies	
21 May 1994	Campo Universitaria	Spain	Wales	0–54		Wales	(Wales) Alan Davies	
11 June 1994	Fletcher's Fields	Canada	Wales	15–33	1994 summer tour	Wales	(Wales) Alan Davies	
18 June 1994	ANZ National Stadium	Fiji	Wales	8–23	1994 summer tour	Wales	(Wales) Alan Davies	
22 June 1994	Teufaiva Sport Stadium	Tonga	Wales	9–18	1994 summer tour	Wales	(Wales) Alan Davies	
25 June 1994		Samoa	Wales	34–9	1994 summer tour	Samoa	(Wales) Alan Davies	
26 November 1994	Cardiff Arms Park/National Stadium	Wales	South Africa	12–20		South Africa	(Wales) Alan Davies	
21 January 1995	Parc des Princes	France	Wales	21–9	1995 Five Nations Championship	France	(Wales) Alan Davies	
18 February 1995	Cardiff Arms Park/National Stadium	Wales	England	9–26	1995 Five Nations Championship	England	(Wales) Alan Davies	
4 March 1995	Murrayfield Stadium	Scotland	Wales	26–13	1995 Five Nations Championship	Scotland	(Wales) Alan Davies	
18 March 1995	Cardiff Arms Park/National Stadium	Wales	Ireland	12–16	1995 Five Nations Championship	Ireland	(Wales) Alan Davies	
27 May 1995	Free State Stadium	Japan	Wales	10–57	1995 Rugby World Cup	Wales	(Australia) Alec Evans (caretaker)	
31 May 1995	Ellis Park Stadium	New Zealand	Wales	34–9	1995 Rugby World Cup	New Zealand	(Australia) Alec Evans (caretaker)	
4 June 1995	Ellis Park Stadium	Ireland	Wales	24–23	1995 Rugby World Cup	Ireland	(Australia) Alec Evans (caretaker)	
2 September 1995	Ellis Park Stadium	South Africa	Wales	40–11		South Africa	(Australia) Alec Evans (caretaker)	
11 November 1995	Cardiff Arms Park/National Stadium	Wales	Fiji	19–15		Wales	(Wales) Kevin Bowring	
16 January 1996	Cardiff Arms Park/National Stadium	Wales	Italy	31–26		Wales	(Wales) Kevin Bowring	
3 February 1996	Twickenham Stadium	England	Wales	21–15	1996 Five Nations Championship	England	(Wales) Kevin Bowring	
17 February 1996	Cardiff Arms Park/National Stadium	Wales	Scotland	14–16	1996 Five Nations Championship	Scotland	(Wales) Kevin Bowring	
2 March 1996	Lansdowne Road	Ireland	Wales	30–17	1996 Five Nations Championship	Ireland	(Wales) Kevin Bowring	
16 March 1996	Cardiff Arms Park/National Stadium	Wales	France	16–15	1996 Five Nations Championship	Wales	(Wales) Kevin Bowring	
9 June 1996	Ballymore Stadium	Australia	Wales	56–25	1996 summer tour	Australia	(Wales) Kevin Bowring	
22 June 1996	Sydney Football Stadium	Australia	Wales	42–3	1996 summer tour	Australia	(Wales) Kevin Bowring	
24 August 1996	Cardiff Arms Park/National Stadium	Wales	Barbarians	31–10		Wales	(Wales) Kevin Bowring	
25 September 1996	Cardiff Arms Park/National Stadium	Wales	France	33–40		France	(Wales) Kevin Bowring	
5 October 1996	Stadio Olimpico	Italy	Wales	22–31		Wales	(Wales) Kevin Bowring	
1 December 1996	Cardiff Arms Park/National Stadium	Wales	Australia	19–28		Australia	(Wales) Kevin Bowring	
15 December 1996	Cardiff Arms Park/National Stadium	Wales	South Africa	20–37		South Africa	(Wales) Kevin Bowring	
11 January 1997	Cardiff Arms Park/National Stadium	Wales	United States	34–14		Wales	(Wales) Kevin Bowring	
18 January 1997	Murrayfield Stadium	Scotland	Wales	19–34	1997 Five Nations Championship	Wales	(Wales) Kevin Bowring	
1 February 1997	Cardiff Arms Park/National Stadium	Wales	Ireland	25–26	1997 Five Nations Championship	Ireland	(Wales) Kevin Bowring	
15 February 1997	Parc des Princes	France	Wales	27–22	1997 Five Nations Championship	France	(Wales) Kevin Bowring	
15 March 1997	Cardiff Arms Park/National Stadium	Wales	England	13–34	1997 Five Nations Championship	England	(Wales) Kevin Bowring	
5 July 1997	Legion Stadium	United States	Wales	20–30	1997 summer tour	Wales	(Wales) Kevin Bowring	
12 July 1997	Boxer Stadium	United States	Wales	23–28	1997 summer tour	Wales	(Wales) Kevin Bowring	
19 July 1997	Fletcher's Fields	Canada	Wales	25–28	1997 summer tour	Wales	(Wales) Kevin Bowring	
30 August 1997	Racecourse Ground	Wales	Romania	70–21	1997 Autumn Internationals	Wales	(Wales) Kevin Bowring	
16 November 1997	St Helen's	Wales	Tonga	46–12	1997 Autumn Internationals	Wales	(Wales) Kevin Bowring	
29 November 1997	Wembley Stadium	Wales	New Zealand	7–42	1997 Autumn Internationals	New Zealand	(Wales) Kevin Bowring	
7 February 1998	Stradey Park	Wales	Italy	23–20		Wales	(Wales) Kevin Bowring	
21 February 1998	Twickenham Stadium	England	Wales	60–26	1998 Five Nations Championship	England	(Wales) Kevin Bowring	
7 March 1998	Wembley Stadium	Wales	Scotland	19–13	1998 Five Nations Championship	Wales	(Wales) Kevin Bowring	
21 March 1998	Lansdowne Road	Ireland	Wales	21–30	1998 Five Nations Championship	Wales	(Wales) Kevin Bowring	
5 April 1998	Wembley Stadium	Wales	France	0–51	1998 Five Nations Championship	France	(Wales) Kevin Bowring	
6 June 1998	Police Grounds	Zimbabwe	Wales	11–49	1998 summer tour	Wales	(Wales) Dennis John (interim)	
27 June 1998	Loftus Versfeld Stadium	South Africa	Wales	96–13	1998 summer tour	South Africa	(Wales) Dennis John (interim)	
14 November 1998	Wembley Stadium	Wales	South Africa	20–28	1998 Autumn Internationals	South Africa	(New Zealand) Graham Henry	
21 November 1998	Stradey Park	Wales	Argentina	43–30	1998 Autumn Internationals	Wales	(New Zealand) Graham Henry	
6 February 1999	Murrayfield Stadium	Scotland	Wales	33–20	1999 Five Nations Championship	Scotland	(New Zealand) Graham Henry	BBC
20 February 1999	Wembley Stadium	Wales	Ireland	23–29	1999 Five Nations Championship	Ireland	(New Zealand) Graham Henry	BBC
6 March 1999	Stade de France	France	Wales	33–34	1999 Five Nations Championship	Wales	(New Zealand) Graham Henry	
20 March 1999	Stadio Comunale di Monigo	Italy	Wales	21–60		Wales	(New Zealand) Graham Henry	
11 April 1999	Wembley Stadium	Wales	England	32–31	1999 Five Nations Championship	Wales	(New Zealand) Graham Henry	BBC
5 June 1999	Estadio Etcheverri	Argentina	Wales	26–36	1999 summer tour	Wales	(New Zealand) Graham Henry	
12 June 1999	Estadio Etcheverri	Argentina	Wales	16–23	1999 summer tour	Wales	(New Zealand) Graham Henry	
26 June 1999	Millennium Stadium	Wales	South Africa	29–19		Wales	(New Zealand) Graham Henry	
21 August 1999	Millennium Stadium	Wales	Canada	33–19	1999 Rugby World Cup warm-up tests	Wales	(New Zealand) Graham Henry	
28 August 1999	Millennium Stadium	Wales	France	34–23	1999 Rugby World Cup warm-up tests	Wales	(New Zealand) Graham Henry	
1 October 1999	Millennium Stadium	Wales	Argentina	23–18	1999 Rugby World Cup	Wales	(New Zealand) Graham Henry	
9 October 1999	Millennium Stadium	Wales	Japan	64–15	1999 Rugby World Cup	Wales	(New Zealand) Graham Henry	
14 October 1999	Millennium Stadium	Wales	Samoa	31–38	1999 Rugby World Cup	Samoa	(New Zealand) Graham Henry	
23 October 1999	Millennium Stadium	Wales	Australia	9–24	1999 Rugby World Cup	Australia	(New Zealand) Graham Henry	
5 February 2000	Millennium Stadium	Wales	France	3–36	2000 Six Nations Championship	France	(New Zealand) Graham Henry	
19 February 2000	Millennium Stadium	Wales	Italy	47–16	2000 Six Nations Championship	Wales	(New Zealand) Graham Henry	BBC
4 March 2000	Twickenham Stadium	England	Wales	46–12	2000 Six Nations Championship	England	(New Zealand) Graham Henry	BBC
18 March 2000	Millennium Stadium	Wales	Scotland	26–18	2000 Six Nations Championship	Wales	(New Zealand) Graham Henry	
1 April 2000	Lansdowne Road	Ireland	Wales	19–23	2000 Six Nations Championship	Wales	(New Zealand) Graham Henry	BBC
11 November 2000	Millennium Stadium	Wales	Samoa	50–6	2000 Autumn Internationals	Wales	(New Zealand) Graham Henry	BBC
18 November 2000	Millennium Stadium	Wales	United States	42–11	2000 Autumn Internationals	Wales	(New Zealand) Graham Henry	BBC
26 November 2000	Millennium Stadium	Wales	South Africa	13–23	2000 Autumn Internationals	South Africa	(New Zealand) Graham Henry	BBC
3 February 2001	Millennium Stadium	Wales	England	15–44	2001 Six Nations Championship	England	(New Zealand) Graham Henry	
17 February 2001	Murrayfield Stadium	Scotland	Wales	28–28	2001 Six Nations Championship	Draw	(New Zealand) Graham Henry	
17 March 2001	Stade de France	France	Wales	35–43	2001 Six Nations Championship	Wales	(New Zealand) Graham Henry	
8 April 2001	Stadio Flaminio	Italy	Wales	23–33	2001 Six Nations Championship	Wales	(New Zealand) Graham Henry	
10 June 2001	Hanazono Rugby Stadium	Japan	Wales	10–64	2001 summer tour	Wales	(Wales) Lynn Howells (caretaker)	BBC
17 June 2001	Chichibunomiya Rugby Stadium	Japan	Wales	30–53	2001 summer tour	Wales	(Wales) Lynn Howells (caretaker)	BBC
13 October 2001	Millennium Stadium	Wales	Ireland	6–35	2001 Six Nations Championship	Ireland	(New Zealand) Graham Henry	
19 September 2001	Millennium Stadium	Wales	Romania	81–9	2001 Autumn Internationals	Wales	(New Zealand) Graham Henry	
10 November 2001	Millennium Stadium	Wales	Argentina	16–30	2001 Autumn Internationals	Argentina	(New Zealand) Graham Henry	BBC
17 November 2001	Millennium Stadium	Wales	Tonga	51–7	2001 Autumn Internationals	Wales	(New Zealand) Graham Henry	
25 November 2001	Millennium Stadium	Wales	Australia	13–21	2001 Autumn Internationals	Australia	(New Zealand) Graham Henry	
3 February 2002	Lansdowne Road	Ireland	Wales	54–10	2002 Six Nations Championship	Ireland	(New Zealand) Graham Henry	BBC
16 February 2002	Millennium Stadium	Wales	France	33–37	2002 Six Nations Championship	France	(New Zealand) Steve Hansen	BBC
2 March 2002	Millennium Stadium	Wales	Italy	44–20	2002 Six Nations Championship	Wales	(New Zealand) Steve Hansen	BBC
23 March 2002	Twickenham Stadium	England	Wales	50–10	2002 Six Nations Championship	England	(New Zealand) Steve Hansen	BBC
6 April 2002	Millennium Stadium	Wales	Scotland	22–27	2002 Six Nations Championship	Scotland	(New Zealand) Steve Hansen	BBC
8 June 2002	Free State Stadium	South Africa	Wales	34–19	2002 summer tour	South Africa	(New Zealand) Steve Hansen	BBC
15 June 2002	Newlands Stadium	South Africa	Wales	19–8	2002 summer tour	South Africa	(New Zealand) Steve Hansen	BBC
1 November 2002	Racecourse Ground	Wales	Romania	40–3	2002 Autumn Internationals	Wales	(New Zealand) Steve Hansen	BBC
9 November 2002	Millennium Stadium	Wales	Fiji	58–14	2002 Autumn Internationals	Wales	(New Zealand) Steve Hansen	BBC
16 November 2002	Millennium Stadium	Wales	Canada	32–21	2002 Autumn Internationals	Wales	(New Zealand) Steve Hansen	BBC
23 November 2002	Millennium Stadium	Wales	New Zealand	17–43	2002 Autumn Internationals	New Zealand	(New Zealand) Steve Hansen	BBC
15 February 2003	Stadio Flaminio	Italy	Wales	30–22	2003 Six Nations Championship	Italy	(New Zealand) Steve Hansen	BBC
22 February 2003	Millennium Stadium	Wales	England	9–26	2003 Six Nations Championship	England	(New Zealand) Steve Hansen	BBC
8 March 2003	Murrayfield Stadium	Scotland	Wales	30–22	2003 Six Nations Championship	Scotland	(New Zealand) Steve Hansen	BBC
22 March 2003	Millennium Stadium	Wales	Ireland	24–25	2003 Six Nations Championship	Ireland	(New Zealand) Steve Hansen	BBC
29 March 2003	Stade de France	France	Wales	33–5	2003 Six Nations Championship	France	(New Zealand) Steve Hansen	BBC
14 June 2003	Stadium Australia	Australia	Wales	30–10	2003 summer tour	Australia	(New Zealand) Steve Hansen	BBC
21 June 2003	Waikato Stadium	New Zealand	Wales	55–3	2003 summer tour	New Zealand	(New Zealand) Steve Hansen	BBC
16 August 2003	Lansdowne Road	Ireland	Wales	35–12	2003 Rugby World Cup warm-up tests	Ireland	(New Zealand) Steve Hansen	BBC
23 August 2003	Millennium Stadium	Wales	England	9–43	2003 Rugby World Cup warm-up tests	England	(New Zealand) Steve Hansen	BBC
27 August 2003	Racecourse Ground	Wales	Romania	54–8	2003 Rugby World Cup warm-up tests	Wales	(Wales) Mike Ruddock	BBC
30 August 2003	Millennium Stadium	Wales	Scotland	23–9	2003 Rugby World Cup warm-up tests	Wales	(New Zealand) Steve Hansen	BBC
12 October 2003	Docklands Stadium	Wales	Canada	41–10	2003 Rugby World Cup	Wales	(New Zealand) Steve Hansen	BBC
19 October 2003	Bruce Stadium	Wales	Tonga	27–20	2003 Rugby World Cup	Wales	(New Zealand) Steve Hansen	BBC
25 October 2003	Bruce Stadium	Italy	Wales	15–27	2003 Rugby World Cup	Wales	(New Zealand) Steve Hansen	BBC
2 November 2003	Stadium Australia	New Zealand	Wales	53–37	2003 Rugby World Cup	New Zealand	(New Zealand) Steve Hansen	BBC
9 November 2003	Lang Park	England	Wales	28–17	2003 Rugby World Cup	England	(New Zealand) Steve Hansen	BBC
14 February 2004	Millennium Stadium	Wales	Scotland	23–10	2004 Six Nations Championship	Wales	(New Zealand) Steve Hansen	BBC
22 February 2004	Lansdowne Road	Ireland	Wales	36–15	2004 Six Nations Championship	Ireland	(New Zealand) Steve Hansen	BBC
7 March 2004	Millennium Stadium	Wales	France	22–29	2004 Six Nations Championship	France	(New Zealand) Steve Hansen	BBC
20 March 2004	Twickenham Stadium	England	Wales	31–21	2004 Six Nations Championship	England	(New Zealand) Steve Hansen	BBC
27 March 2004	Millennium Stadium	Wales	Italy	44–10	2004 Six Nations Championship	Wales	(New Zealand) Steve Hansen	BBC
12 June 2004	Estadio Ferro Carril Oeste	Argentina	Wales	50–44	2004 summer tour	Argentina	(Wales) Mike Ruddock	BBC
19 June 2004	José Amalfitani Stadium	Argentina	Wales	20–35	2004 summer tour	Wales	(Wales) Mike Ruddock	BBC
26 June 2004	Loftus Versfeld Stadium	South Africa	Wales	53–18	2004 summer tour	South Africa	(Wales) Mike Ruddock	BBC
6 November 2004	Millennium Stadium	Wales	South Africa	36–38	2004 Autumn Internationals	South Africa	(Wales) Mike Ruddock	BBC
12 November 2004	Millennium Stadium	Wales	Romania	66–7	2004 Autumn Internationals	Wales	(Wales) Mike Ruddock	BBC
20 November 2004	Millennium Stadium	Wales	New Zealand	25–26	2004 Autumn Internationals	New Zealand	(Wales) Mike Ruddock	BBC
26 November 2004	Millennium Stadium	Wales	Japan	98–0	2004 Autumn Internationals	Wales	(Wales) Mike Ruddock	BBC
5 February 2005	Millennium Stadium	Wales	England	11–9	2005 Six Nations Championship	Wales	(Wales) Mike Ruddock	BBC
12 February 2005	Stadio Flaminio	Italy	Wales	8–38	2005 Six Nations Championship	Wales	(Wales) Mike Ruddock	BBC
26 February 2005	Stade de France	France	Wales	18–24	2005 Six Nations Championship	Wales	(Wales) Mike Ruddock	BBC
13 March 2005	Murrayfield Stadium	Scotland	Wales	22–46	2005 Six Nations Championship	Wales	(Wales) Mike Ruddock	BBC
19 March 2005	Millennium Stadium	Wales	Ireland	32–20	2005 Six Nations Championship	Wales	(Wales) Mike Ruddock	BBC
4 June 2005	Rentschler Field	United States	Wales	3–77	2005 summer tour	Wales	(Wales) Mike Ruddock	BBC
11 June 2005	York Stadium	Canada	Wales	3–60	2005 summer tour	Wales	(Wales) Mike Ruddock	BBC
5 November 2005	Millennium Stadium	Wales	New Zealand	3–41	2005 Autumn Internationals	New Zealand	(Wales) Mike Ruddock	BBC
11 November 2005	Millennium Stadium	Wales	Fiji	11–10	2005 Autumn Internationals	Wales	(Wales) Mike Ruddock	BBC
19 November 2005	Millennium Stadium	Wales	South Africa	16–33	2005 Autumn Internationals	South Africa	(Wales) Mike Ruddock	BBC
26 November 2005	Millennium Stadium	Wales	Australia	24–22	2005 Autumn Internationals	Wales	(Wales) Mike Ruddock	BBC
4 February 2006	Twickenham Stadium	England	Wales	47–13	2006 Six Nations Championship	England	(Wales) Mike Ruddock	BBC
12 February 2006	Millennium Stadium	Wales	Scotland	28–18	2006 Six Nations Championship	Wales	(Wales) Mike Ruddock	BBC
26 February 2006	Lansdowne Road	Ireland	Wales	31–5	2006 Six Nations Championship	Ireland	(Australia) Scott Johnson (interim)	BBC
11 March 2006	Millennium Stadium	Wales	Italy	18–18	2006 Six Nations Championship	Draw	(Australia) Scott Johnson (interim)	BBC
18 March 2006	Millennium Stadium	Wales	France	16–21	2006 Six Nations Championship	France	(Australia) Scott Johnson (interim)	BBC
11 June 2006	Estadio Raúl Conti	Argentina	Wales	27–25	2006 summer tour	Argentina	(Wales) Gareth Jenkins	BBC
17 June 2006	José Amalfitani Stadium	Argentina	Wales	45–27	2006 summer tour	Argentina	(Wales) Gareth Jenkins	BBC
4 November 2006	Millennium Stadium	Wales	Australia	29–29	2006 Autumn Internationals	Draw	(Wales) Gareth Jenkins	BBC
11 November 2006	Millennium Stadium	Wales	Pacific Islanders	38–20	2006 Autumn Internationals	Wales	(Wales) Gareth Jenkins	BBC
17 November 2006	Millennium Stadium	Wales	Canada	61–26	2006 Autumn Internationals	Wales	(Wales) Gareth Jenkins	BBC
25 November 2006	Millennium Stadium	Wales	New Zealand	10–45	2006 Autumn Internationals	New Zealand	(Wales) Gareth Jenkins	BBC
4 February 2007	Millennium Stadium	Wales	Ireland	9–19	2007 Six Nations Championship	Ireland	(Wales) Gareth Jenkins	BBC
10 February 2007	Murrayfield Stadium	Scotland	Wales	21–9	2007 Six Nations Championship	Scotland	(Wales) Gareth Jenkins	BBC
24 February 2007	Stade de France	France	Wales	32–21	2007 Six Nations Championship	France	(Wales) Gareth Jenkins	BBC
10 March 2007	Stadio Flaminio	Italy	Wales	23–20	2007 Six Nations Championship	Italy	(Wales) Gareth Jenkins	BBC
17 March 2007	Millennium Stadium	Wales	England	27–18	2007 Six Nations Championship	Wales	(Wales) Gareth Jenkins	BBC
26 May 2007	Stadium Australia	Australia	Wales	29–23	2007 summer tour	Australia	(Wales) Gareth Jenkins	BBC
2 June 2007	Lang Park	Australia	Wales	31–0	2007 summer tour	Australia	(Wales) Gareth Jenkins	BBC
4 August 2007	Twickenham Stadium	England	Wales	62–5	2007 Rugby World Cup warm-up tests	England	(Wales) Gareth Jenkins	BBC
18 August 2007	Millennium Stadium	Wales	Argentina	27–20	2007 Rugby World Cup warm-up tests	Wales	(Wales) Gareth Jenkins	BBC
26 August 2007	Millennium Stadium	Wales	France	7–34	2007 Rugby World Cup warm-up tests	France	(Wales) Gareth Jenkins	BBC
9 September 2007	Stade de la Beaujoire	Wales	Canada	42–17	2007 Rugby World Cup	Wales	(Wales) Gareth Jenkins	BBC
15 September 2007	Millennium Stadium	Wales	Australia	20–32	2007 Rugby World Cup	Australia	(Wales) Gareth Jenkins	BBC
20 September 2007	Millennium Stadium	Wales	Japan	72–18	2007 Rugby World Cup	Wales	(Wales) Gareth Jenkins	BBC
29 September 2007	Stade de la Beaujoire	Wales	Fiji	34–38	2007 Rugby World Cup	Fiji	(Wales) Gareth Jenkins	BBC
24 November 2007	Millennium Stadium	Wales	South Africa	12–34	2007 Autumn Internationals	South Africa	(Wales) Nigel Davies (interim)	BBC
2 February 2008	Twickenham Stadium	England	Wales	19–26	2008 Six Nations Championship	Wales	(New Zealand) Warren Gatland	BBC
9 February 2008	Millennium Stadium	Wales	Scotland	30–15	2008 Six Nations Championship	Wales	(New Zealand) Warren Gatland	BBC
23 February 2008	Millennium Stadium	Wales	Italy	47–8	2008 Six Nations Championship	Wales	(New Zealand) Warren Gatland	BBC
8 March 2008	Croke Park	Ireland	Wales	12–16	2008 Six Nations Championship	Wales	(New Zealand) Warren Gatland	BBC
15 March 2008	Millennium Stadium	Wales	France	29–12	2008 Six Nations Championship	Wales	(New Zealand) Warren Gatland	BBC
7 June 2008	Free State Stadium	South Africa	Wales	43–17	2008 summer tour	South Africa	(New Zealand) Warren Gatland	BBC
14 June 2008	Loftus Versfeld Stadium	South Africa	Wales	37–21	2008 summer tour	South Africa	(New Zealand) Warren Gatland	BBC
8 November 2008	Millennium Stadium	Wales	South Africa	15–20	2008 Autumn Internationals	South Africa	(New Zealand) Warren Gatland	BBC
14 November 2008	Millennium Stadium	Wales	Canada	34–13	2008 Autumn Internationals	Wales	(New Zealand) Warren Gatland	BBC
22 November 2008	Millennium Stadium	Wales	New Zealand	9–29	2008 Autumn Internationals	New Zealand	(New Zealand) Warren Gatland	BBC
29 November 2008	Millennium Stadium	Wales	Australia	21–18	2008 Autumn Internationals	Wales	(New Zealand) Warren Gatland	BBC
8 February 2009	Murrayfield Stadium	Scotland	Wales	13–26	2009 Six Nations Championship	Wales	(New Zealand) Warren Gatland	BBC
14 February 2009	Millennium Stadium	Wales	England	23–15	2009 Six Nations Championship	Wales	(New Zealand) Warren Gatland	BBC
27 February 2009	Stade de France	France	Wales	21–16	2009 Six Nations Championship	France	(New Zealand) Warren Gatland	BBC
14 March 2009	Stadio Flaminio	Italy	Wales	15–20	2009 Six Nations Championship	Wales	(New Zealand) Warren Gatland	BBC
21 March 2009	Millennium Stadium	Wales	Ireland	15–17	2009 Six Nations Championship	Ireland	(New Zealand) Warren Gatland	BBC
30 May 2009	York Stadium	Canada	Wales	23–32	2009 summer tour	Wales	(Wales) Robin McBryde (interim)	BBC
6 June 2009	Toyota Park	United States	Wales	15–48	2009 summer tour	Wales	(Wales) Robin McBryde (interim)	BBC
7 November 2009	Millennium Stadium	Wales	New Zealand	12–19	2009 Autumn Internationals	New Zealand	(New Zealand) Warren Gatland	BBC
13 November 2009	Millennium Stadium	Wales	Samoa	17–13	2009 Autumn Internationals	Wales	(New Zealand) Warren Gatland	BBC
21 November 2009	Millennium Stadium	Wales	Argentina	33–16	2009 Autumn Internationals	Wales	(New Zealand) Warren Gatland	BBC
28 November 2009	Millennium Stadium	Wales	Australia	12–33	2009 Autumn Internationals	Australia	(New Zealand) Warren Gatland	BBC
6 February 2010	Twickenham Stadium	England	Wales	30–17	2010 Six Nations Championship	England	(New Zealand) Warren Gatland	BBC
13 February 2010	Millennium Stadium	Wales	Scotland	31–24	2010 Six Nations Championship	Wales	(New Zealand) Warren Gatland	BBC
26 February 2010	Millennium Stadium	Wales	France	20–26	2010 Six Nations Championship	France	(New Zealand) Warren Gatland	BBC
13 March 2010	Croke Park	Ireland	Wales	27–12	2010 Six Nations Championship	Ireland	(New Zealand) Warren Gatland	BBC
20 March 2010	Millennium Stadium	Wales	Italy	33–10	2010 Six Nations Championship	Wales	(New Zealand) Warren Gatland	BBC
5 June 2010	Millennium Stadium	Wales	South Africa	31–34	2010 summer tour	South Africa	(New Zealand) Warren Gatland	BBC
19 June 2010	Carisbrook	New Zealand	Wales	42–9	2010 summer tour	New Zealand	(New Zealand) Warren Gatland	BBC
26 June 2010	Waikato Stadium	New Zealand	Wales	29–10	2010 summer tour	New Zealand	(New Zealand) Warren Gatland	BBC
6 November 2010	Millennium Stadium	Wales	Australia	16–25	2010 Autumn Internationals	Australia	(New Zealand) Warren Gatland	BBC
13 November 2010	Millennium Stadium	Wales	South Africa	25–29	2010 Autumn Internationals	South Africa	(New Zealand) Warren Gatland	BBC
19 November 2010	Millennium Stadium	Wales	Fiji	16–16	2010 Autumn Internationals	Draw	(New Zealand) Warren Gatland	BBC
27 November 2010	Millennium Stadium	Wales	New Zealand	25–37	2010 Autumn Internationals	New Zealand	(New Zealand) Warren Gatland	BBC
4 February 2011	Millennium Stadium	Wales	England	19–26	2011 Six Nations Championship	England	(New Zealand) Warren Gatland	BBC
12 February 2011	Murrayfield Stadium	Scotland	Wales	6–24	2011 Six Nations Championship	Wales	(New Zealand) Warren Gatland	BBC
26 February 2011	Stadio Flaminio	Italy	Wales	16–24	2011 Six Nations Championship	Wales	(New Zealand) Warren Gatland	BBC
12 March 2011	Millennium Stadium	Wales	Ireland	19–13	2011 Six Nations Championship	Wales	(New Zealand) Warren Gatland	BBC
19 March 2011	Stade de France	France	Wales	28–9	2011 Six Nations Championship	France	(New Zealand) Warren Gatland	BBC
4 June 2011	Millennium Stadium	Wales	Barbarians	28–31	2011 Rugby World Cup warm-up matches	Barbarians	(New Zealand) Warren Gatland	BBC
6 August 2011	Twickenham Stadium	England	Wales	23–19	2011 Rugby World Cup warm-up matches	England	(New Zealand) Warren Gatland	BBC
13 August 2011	Millennium Stadium	Wales	England	19–9	2011 Rugby World Cup warm-up matches	Wales	(New Zealand) Warren Gatland	BBC
20 August 2011	Millennium Stadium	Wales	Argentina	28–13	2011 Rugby World Cup warm-up matches	Wales	(New Zealand) Warren Gatland	BBC
11 September 2011	Wellington Regional Stadium	South Africa	Wales	17–16	2011 Rugby World Cup	South Africa	(New Zealand) Warren Gatland	BBC
18 September 2011	Waikato Stadium	Wales	Samoa	17–10	2011 Rugby World Cup	Wales	(New Zealand) Warren Gatland	BBC
26 September 2011	Yarrow Stadium	Wales	Namibia	81–7	2011 Rugby World Cup	Wales	(New Zealand) Warren Gatland	BBC
2 October 2011	Waikato Stadium	Wales	Fiji	66–0	2011 Rugby World Cup	Wales	(New Zealand) Warren Gatland	BBC
8 October 2011	Wellington Regional Stadium	Ireland	Wales	10–22	2011 Rugby World Cup	Wales	(New Zealand) Warren Gatland	BBC
15 October 2011	Eden Park	Wales	France	8–9	2011 Rugby World Cup	France	(New Zealand) Warren Gatland	BBC
21 October 2011	Eden Park	Wales	Australia	18–21	2011 Rugby World Cup	Australia	(New Zealand) Warren Gatland	BBC
3 December 2011	Millennium Stadium	Wales	Australia	18–24	Friendly	Australia	(New Zealand) Warren Gatland	BBC
5 February 2012	Aviva Stadium	Ireland	Wales	21–23	2012 Six Nations Championship	Wales	(New Zealand) Warren Gatland	BBC
12 February 2012	Millennium Stadium	Wales	Scotland	27–13	2012 Six Nations Championship	Wales	(New Zealand) Warren Gatland	BBC
25 February 2012	Twickenham Stadium	England	Wales	12–19	2012 Six Nations Championship	Wales	(New Zealand) Warren Gatland	BBC
10 March 2012	Millennium Stadium	Wales	Italy	24–3	2012 Six Nations Championship	Wales	(New Zealand) Warren Gatland	BBC
17 March 2012	Millennium Stadium	Wales	France	16–9	2012 Six Nations Championship	Wales	(New Zealand) Warren Gatland	BBC
2 June 2012	Millennium Stadium	Wales	Barbarians	30–21	2012 summer tour	Wales	(Wales) Rob Howley (interim)	BBC
9 June 2012	Lang Park	Australia	Wales	27–19	2012 summer tour	Australia	(Wales) Rob Howley (interim)	BBC
16 June 2012	Docklands Stadium	Australia	Wales	25–23	2012 summer tour	Australia	(Wales) Rob Howley (interim)	BBC
23 June 2012	Sydney Football Stadium	Australia	Wales	20–19	2012 summer tour	Australia	(Wales) Rob Howley (interim)	BBC
10 November 2012	Millennium Stadium	Wales	Argentina	12–26	2012 Autumn Internationals	Argentina	(Wales) Rob Howley (interim)	BBC
16 November 2012	Millennium Stadium	Wales	Samoa	19–26	2012 Autumn Internationals	Samoa	(Wales) Rob Howley (interim)	BBC
24 November 2012	Millennium Stadium	Wales	New Zealand	10–33	2012 Autumn Internationals	New Zealand	(New Zealand) Warren Gatland	BBC
1 December 2012	Millennium Stadium	Wales	Australia	12–14	2012 Autumn Internationals	Australia	(New Zealand) Warren Gatland	BBC
2 February 2013	Millennium Stadium	Wales	Ireland	22–30	2013 Six Nations Championship	Ireland	(Wales) Rob Howley (interim)	BBC
9 February 2013	Stade de France	France	Wales	6–16	2013 Six Nations Championship	Wales	(Wales) Rob Howley (interim)	BBC
22 February 2013	Stadio Olimpico	Italy	Wales	9–26	2013 Six Nations Championship	Wales	(Wales) Rob Howley (interim)	BBC
9 March 2013	Murrayfield Stadium	Scotland	Wales	18–28	2013 Six Nations Championship	Wales	(Wales) Rob Howley (interim)	BBC
16 March 2013	Millennium Stadium	Wales	England	30–3	2013 Six Nations Championship	Wales	(Wales) Rob Howley (interim)	BBC
8 June 2013	Hanazono Rugby Stadium	Japan	Wales	18–22	2013 summer tour	Wales	(Wales) Robin McBryde (interim)	BBC
15 June 2013	Chichibunomiya Rugby Stadium	Japan	Wales	23–8	2013 summer tour	Japan	(Wales) Robin McBryde (interim)	BBC
9 November 2013	Millennium Stadium	Wales	South Africa	15–24	2013 Autumn Internationals	South Africa	(New Zealand) Warren Gatland	BBC
16 November 2013	Millennium Stadium	Wales	Argentina	40–6	2013 Autumn Internationals	Wales	(New Zealand) Warren Gatland	BBC
22 November 2013	Millennium Stadium	Wales	Tonga	17–7	2013 Autumn Internationals	Wales	(New Zealand) Warren Gatland	BBC
30 November 2013	Millennium Stadium	Wales	Australia	26–30	2013 Autumn Internationals	Australia	(New Zealand) Warren Gatland	BBC
1 February 2014	Millennium Stadium	Wales	Italy	23–15	2014 Six Nations Championship	Wales	(New Zealand) Warren Gatland	BBC
8 February 2014	Aviva Stadium	Ireland	Wales	26–3	2014 Six Nations Championship	Ireland	(New Zealand) Warren Gatland	BBC
21 February 2014	Millennium Stadium	Wales	France	27–6	2014 Six Nations Championship	Wales	(New Zealand) Warren Gatland	BBC
9 March 2014	Twickenham Stadium	England	Wales	29–18	2014 Six Nations Championship	England	(New Zealand) Warren Gatland	BBC
15 March 2014	Millennium Stadium	Wales	Scotland	51–3	2014 Six Nations Championship	Wales	(New Zealand) Warren Gatland	BBC
14 June 2014	Kings Park Stadium	South Africa	Wales	38–16	2014 summer tour	South Africa	(New Zealand) Warren Gatland	BBC
21 June 2014	Mbombela Stadium	South Africa	Wales	31–30	2014 summer tour	South Africa	(New Zealand) Warren Gatland	BBC
8 November 2014	Millennium Stadium	Wales	Australia	28–33	2014 Autumn Internationals	Australia	(New Zealand) Warren Gatland	BBC
15 November 2014	Millennium Stadium	Wales	Fiji	17–13	2014 Autumn Internationals	Wales	(New Zealand) Warren Gatland	BBC
22 November 2014	Millennium Stadium	Wales	New Zealand	16–34	2014 Autumn Internationals	New Zealand	(New Zealand) Warren Gatland	BBC
29 November 2014	Millennium Stadium	Wales	South Africa	12–6	2014 Autumn Internationals	Wales	(New Zealand) Warren Gatland	BBC
6 February 2015	Millennium Stadium	Wales	England	16–21	2015 Six Nations Championship	England	(New Zealand) Warren Gatland	BBC
15 February 2015	Murrayfield Stadium	Scotland	Wales	23–26	2015 Six Nations Championship	Wales	(New Zealand) Warren Gatland	BBC
28 February 2015	Stade de France	France	Wales	13–20	2015 Six Nations Championship	Wales	(New Zealand) Warren Gatland	BBC
14 March 2015	Millennium Stadium	Wales	Ireland	23–16	2015 Six Nations Championship	Wales	(New Zealand) Warren Gatland	BBC
21 March 2015	Stadio Olimpico	Italy	Wales	20–61	2015 Six Nations Championship	Wales	(New Zealand) Warren Gatland	BBC
8 August 2015	Millennium Stadium	Wales	Ireland	21–35	2015 Rugby World Cup warm-up matches	Ireland	(New Zealand) Warren Gatland	BBC
29 August 2015	Aviva Stadium	Ireland	Wales	10–16	2015 Rugby World Cup warm-up matches	Wales	(New Zealand) Warren Gatland	BBC
5 September 2015	Millennium Stadium	Wales	Italy	23–19	2015 Rugby World Cup warm-up matches	Wales	(New Zealand) Warren Gatland	BBC
20 September 2015	Millennium Stadium	Wales	Uruguay	54–9	2015 Rugby World Cup	Wales	(New Zealand) Warren Gatland	BBC
26 September 2015	Twickenham Stadium	England	Wales	25–28	2015 Rugby World Cup	Wales	(New Zealand) Warren Gatland	BBC
1 October 2015	Millennium Stadium	Wales	Fiji	23–13	2015 Rugby World Cup	Wales	(New Zealand) Warren Gatland	BBC
10 October 2015	Twickenham Stadium	Australia	Wales	15–6	2015 Rugby World Cup	Australia	(New Zealand) Warren Gatland	BBC
17 October 2015	Twickenham Stadium	South Africa	Wales	23–19	2015 Rugby World Cup	South Africa	(New Zealand) Warren Gatland	BBC
7 February 2016	Aviva Stadium	Ireland	Wales	16–16	2016 Six Nations Championship	Draw	(New Zealand) Warren Gatland	BBC
13 February 2016	Millennium Stadium	Wales	Scotland	27–23	2016 Six Nations Championship	Wales	(New Zealand) Warren Gatland	BBC
26 February 2016	Millennium Stadium	Wales	France	19–10	2016 Six Nations Championship	Wales	(New Zealand) Warren Gatland	BBC
12 March 2016	Twickenham Stadium	England	Wales	25–21	2016 Six Nations Championship	England	(New Zealand) Warren Gatland	BBC
19 March 2016	Millennium Stadium	Wales	Italy	64–14	2016 Six Nations Championship	Wales	(New Zealand) Warren Gatland	BBC
30 May 2016	Twickenham Stadium	England	Wales	27–13	2016 summer tour	England	(New Zealand) Warren Gatland	BBC
11 June 2016	Eden Park	New Zealand	Wales	39–21	2016 summer tour	New Zealand	(New Zealand) Warren Gatland	BBC
18 June 2016	Wellington Regional Stadium	New Zealand	Wales	36–22	2016 summer tour	New Zealand	(New Zealand) Warren Gatland	BBC
25 June 2016	Forsyth Barr Stadium	New Zealand	Wales	46–6	2016 summer tour	New Zealand	(New Zealand) Warren Gatland	BBC
5 November 2016	Millennium Stadium	Wales	Australia	8–32	2016 Autumn Internationals	Australia	(Wales) Rob Howley (interim)	BBC
12 November 2016	Millennium Stadium	Wales	Argentina	24–20	2016 Autumn Internationals	Wales	(Wales) Rob Howley (interim)	BBC
19 November 2016	Millennium Stadium	Wales	Japan	33–30	2016 Autumn Internationals	Wales	(Wales) Rob Howley (interim)	BBC
26 November 2016	Millennium Stadium	Wales	South Africa	27–13	2016 Autumn Internationals	Wales	(Wales) Rob Howley (interim)	BBC
5 February 2017	Stadio Olimpico	Italy	Wales	7–33	2017 Six Nations Championship	Wales	(Wales) Rob Howley (interim)	BBC
11 February 2017	Millennium Stadium	Wales	England	16–21	2017 Six Nations Championship	England	(Wales) Rob Howley (interim)	BBC
25 February 2017	Murrayfield Stadium	Scotland	Wales	29–13	2017 Six Nations Championship	Scotland	(Wales) Rob Howley (interim)	BBC
10 March 2017	Millennium Stadium	Wales	Ireland	22–9	2017 Six Nations Championship	Wales	(Wales) Rob Howley (interim)	BBC
18 March 2017	Stade de France	France	Wales	20–18	2017 Six Nations Championship	France	(Wales) Rob Howley (interim)	BBC
16 June 2017	Eden Park	Tonga	Wales	6–24	2017 summer tour	Wales	(Wales) Robin McBryde (interim)	BBC
23 June 2017	Apia Park	Samoa	Wales	17–19	2017 summer tour	Wales	(Wales) Robin McBryde (interim)	BBC
11 November 2017	Millennium Stadium	Wales	Australia	21–29	2017 Autumn Internationals	Australia	(New Zealand) Warren Gatland	BBC
18 November 2017	Millennium Stadium	Wales	Georgia	13–6	2017 Autumn Internationals	Wales	(New Zealand) Warren Gatland	BBC
25 November 2017	Millennium Stadium	Wales	New Zealand	18–33	2017 Autumn Internationals	New Zealand	(New Zealand) Warren Gatland	BBC
2 December 2017	Millennium Stadium	Wales	South Africa	24–22	2017 Autumn Internationals	Wales	(New Zealand) Warren Gatland	BBC
3 February 2018	Millennium Stadium	Wales	Scotland	34–7	2018 Six Nations Championship	Wales	(New Zealand) Warren Gatland	BBC
10 February 2018	Twickenham Stadium	England	Wales	12–6	2018 Six Nations Championship	England	(New Zealand) Warren Gatland	BBC
24 February 2018	Aviva Stadium	Ireland	Wales	37–27	2018 Six Nations Championship	Ireland	(New Zealand) Warren Gatland	BBC
11 March 2018	Millennium Stadium	Wales	Italy	38–14	2018 Six Nations Championship	Wales	(New Zealand) Warren Gatland	BBC
17 March 2018	Millennium Stadium	Wales	France	14–13	2018 Six Nations Championship	Wales	(New Zealand) Warren Gatland	BBC
2 June 2018	Robert F. Kennedy Memorial Stadium	Wales	South Africa	22–20	2018 summer tour	Wales	(New Zealand) Warren Gatland	BBC
9 June 2018	Estadio San Juan del Bicentenario	Argentina	Wales	10–23	2018 summer tour	Wales	(New Zealand) Warren Gatland	BBC
16 June 2018	Estadio Brigadier López	Argentina	Wales	12–30	2018 summer tour	Wales	(New Zealand) Warren Gatland	BBC
3 November 2018	Millennium Stadium	Wales	Scotland	21–10	2018 Autumn Internationals	Wales	(New Zealand) Warren Gatland	BBC
10 November 2018	Millennium Stadium	Wales	Australia	9–6	2018 Autumn Internationals	Wales	(New Zealand) Warren Gatland	BBC
17 November 2018	Millennium Stadium	Wales	Tonga	74–24	2018 Autumn Internationals	Wales	(New Zealand) Warren Gatland	BBC
24 November 2018	Millennium Stadium	Wales	South Africa	20–11	2018 Autumn Internationals	Wales	(New Zealand) Warren Gatland	BBC
1 February 2019	Stade de France	France	Wales	19–24	2019 Six Nations Championship	Wales	(New Zealand) Warren Gatland	BBC
9 February 2019	Stadio Olimpico	Italy	Wales	15–26	2019 Six Nations Championship	Wales	(New Zealand) Warren Gatland	BBC
23 February 2019	Millennium Stadium	Wales	England	21–13	2019 Six Nations Championship	Wales	(New Zealand) Warren Gatland	BBC
9 March 2019	Murrayfield Stadium	Scotland	Wales	11–18	2019 Six Nations Championship	Wales	(New Zealand) Warren Gatland	BBC
16 March 2019	Millennium Stadium	Wales	Ireland	25–7	2019 Six Nations Championship	Wales	(New Zealand) Warren Gatland	BBC
11 August 2019	Twickenham Stadium	England	Wales	33–19	2019 Rugby World Cup warm-up matches	England	(New Zealand) Warren Gatland	BBC
17 August 2019	Millennium Stadium	Wales	England	13–6	2019 Rugby World Cup warm-up matches	Wales	(New Zealand) Warren Gatland	BBC
31 August 2019	Millennium Stadium	Wales	Ireland	17–22	2019 Rugby World Cup warm-up matches	Ireland	(New Zealand) Warren Gatland	BBC
7 September 2019	Aviva Stadium	Ireland	Wales	19–10	2019 Rugby World Cup warm-up matches	Ireland	(New Zealand) Warren Gatland	BBC
23 September 2019	Toyota Stadium	Wales	Georgia	43–14	2019 Rugby World Cup	Wales	(New Zealand) Warren Gatland	BBC
29 September 2019	Ajinomoto Stadium	Australia	Wales	25–29	2019 Rugby World Cup	Wales	(New Zealand) Warren Gatland	BBC
9 October 2019	Oita Stadium	Wales	Fiji	29–17	2019 Rugby World Cup	Wales	(New Zealand) Warren Gatland	BBC
13 October 2019	Kumamoto Stadium	Wales	Uruguay	35–13	2019 Rugby World Cup	Wales	(New Zealand) Warren Gatland	BBC
20 October 2019	Oita Stadium	Wales	France	20–19	2019 Rugby World Cup	Wales	(New Zealand) Warren Gatland	BBC
27 October 2019	International Stadium Yokohama	Wales	South Africa	16–19	2019 Rugby World Cup	South Africa	(New Zealand) Warren Gatland	BBC
1 November 2019	International Stadium Yokohama	New Zealand	Wales	40–17	2019 Rugby World Cup	New Zealand	(New Zealand) Warren Gatland	BBC
1 February 2020	Millennium Stadium	Wales	Italy	42–0	2020 Six Nations Championship	Wales	(New Zealand) Wayne Pivac	BBC
8 February 2020	Aviva Stadium	Ireland	Wales	24–14	2020 Six Nations Championship	Ireland	(New Zealand) Wayne Pivac	BBC
22 February 2020	Millennium Stadium	Wales	France	23–27	2020 Six Nations Championship	France	(New Zealand) Wayne Pivac	BBC
7 March 2020	Twickenham Stadium	England	Wales	33–30	2020 Six Nations Championship	England	(New Zealand) Wayne Pivac	BBC
24 October 2020	Stade de France	France	Wales	38–21	Friendly	France	(New Zealand) Wayne Pivac	BBC
31 October 2020	Parc y Scarlets	Wales	Scotland	10–14	2020 Six Nations Championship	Scotland	(New Zealand) Wayne Pivac	BBC
13 November 2020	Aviva Stadium	Ireland	Wales	32–9	Autumn Nations Cup	Ireland	(New Zealand) Wayne Pivac	BBC
21 November 2020	Parc y Scarlets	Wales	Georgia	18–0	Autumn Nations Cup	Wales	(New Zealand) Wayne Pivac	BBC
28 November 2020	Parc y Scarlets	Wales	England	13–24	Autumn Nations Cup	England	(New Zealand) Wayne Pivac	BBC
5 December 2020	Parc y Scarlets	Wales	Italy	38–18	Autumn Nations Cup	Wales	(New Zealand) Wayne Pivac	BBC
7 February 2021	Millennium Stadium	Wales	Ireland	21–16	2021 Six Nations Championship	Wales	(New Zealand) Wayne Pivac	BBC
13 February 2021	Murrayfield Stadium	Scotland	Wales	24–25	2021 Six Nations Championship	Wales	(New Zealand) Wayne Pivac	BBC
27 February 2021	Millennium Stadium	Wales	England	40–24	2021 Six Nations Championship	Wales	(New Zealand) Wayne Pivac	BBC
13 March 2021	Stadio Olimpico	Italy	Wales	7–48	2021 Six Nations Championship	Wales	(New Zealand) Wayne Pivac	BBC
20 March 2021	Stade de France	France	Wales	32–30	2021 Six Nations Championship	France	(New Zealand) Wayne Pivac	BBC
3 July 2021	Millennium Stadium	Wales	Canada	68–12	2021 mid-year rugby union internationals	Wales	(New Zealand) Wayne Pivac	BBC
10 July 2021	Millennium Stadium	Wales	Argentina	20–20	2021 mid-year rugby union internationals	Draw	(New Zealand) Wayne Pivac	BBC
17 July 2021	Millennium Stadium	Wales	Argentina	11–33	2021 mid-year rugby union internationals	Argentina	(New Zealand) Wayne Pivac	BBC
30 October 2021	Millennium Stadium	Wales	New Zealand	16–54	2021 Autumn Internationals	New Zealand	(New Zealand) Wayne Pivac	BBC
6 November 2021	Millennium Stadium	Wales	South Africa	18–23	2021 Autumn Internationals	South Africa	(New Zealand) Wayne Pivac	BBC
14 November 2021	Millennium Stadium	Wales	Fiji	38–23	2021 Autumn Internationals	Wales	(New Zealand) Wayne Pivac	BBC
20 November 2021	Millennium Stadium	Wales	Australia	29–28	2021 Autumn Internationals	Wales	(New Zealand) Wayne Pivac	BBC
5 February 2022	Aviva Stadium	Ireland	Wales	29–7	2022 Six Nations Championship	Ireland	(New Zealand) Wayne Pivac	BBC
12 February 2022	Millennium Stadium	Wales	Scotland	20–17	2022 Six Nations Championship	Wales	(New Zealand) Wayne Pivac	BBC
26 February 2022	Twickenham Stadium	England	Wales	23–19	2022 Six Nations Championship	England	(New Zealand) Wayne Pivac	BBC
11 March 2022	Millennium Stadium	Wales	France	9–13	2022 Six Nations Championship	France	(New Zealand) Wayne Pivac	BBC
19 March 2022	Millennium Stadium	Wales	Italy	21–22	2022 Six Nations Championship	Italy	(New Zealand) Wayne Pivac	BBC
2 July 2022	Loftus Versfeld Stadium	South Africa	Wales	32–29	2022 summer tour	South Africa	(New Zealand) Wayne Pivac	BBC
9 July 2022	Free State Stadium	South Africa	Wales	12–13	2022 summer tour	Wales	(New Zealand) Wayne Pivac	BBC
16 July 2022	Cape Town Stadium	South Africa	Wales	30–14	2022 summer tour	South Africa	(New Zealand) Wayne Pivac	BBC
5 November 2022	Millennium Stadium	Wales	New Zealand	23–55	2022 Autumn Internationals	New Zealand	(New Zealand) Wayne Pivac	BBC
12 November 2022	Millennium Stadium	Wales	Argentina	20–13	2022 Autumn Internationals	Wales	(New Zealand) Wayne Pivac	BBC
19 November 2022	Millennium Stadium	Wales	Georgia	12–13	2022 Autumn Internationals	Georgia	(New Zealand) Wayne Pivac	BBC
26 November 2022	Millennium Stadium	Wales	Australia	34–39	2022 Autumn Internationals	Australia	(New Zealand) Wayne Pivac	BBC
4 February 2023	Millennium Stadium	Wales	Ireland	10–34	2023 Six Nations Championship	Ireland	(New Zealand) Warren Gatland	Six Nations Rugby
11 February 2023	Murrayfield Stadium	Scotland	Wales	35–7	2023 Six Nations Championship	Scotland	(New Zealand) Warren Gatland	Six Nations Rugby
25 February 2023	Millennium Stadium	Wales	England	10–20	2023 Six Nations Championship	England	(New Zealand) Warren Gatland	Six Nations Rugby
11 March 2023	Stadio Olimpico	Italy	Wales	17–29	2023 Six Nations Championship	Wales	(New Zealand) Warren Gatland	Six Nations Rugby
18 March 2023	Stade de France	France	Wales	41–28	2023 Six Nations Championship	France	(New Zealand) Warren Gatland	Six Nations Rugby
5 August 2023	Millennium Stadium	Wales	England	20–9	2023 Rugby World Cup warm-up	Wales	(New Zealand) Warren Gatland	BBC
12 August 2023	Twickenham Stadium	England	Wales	19–17	2023 Rugby World Cup warm-up	England	(New Zealand) Warren Gatland	BBC
19 August 2023	Millennium Stadium	Wales	South Africa	16–52	2023 Rugby World Cup warm-up	South Africa	(New Zealand) Warren Gatland	BBC
10 September 2023	Nouveau Stade de Bordeaux	Wales	Fiji	32–26	2023 Rugby World Cup	Wales	(New Zealand) Warren Gatland	BBC
16 September 2023	Allianz Riviera	Wales	Portugal	28–8	2023 Rugby World Cup	Wales	(New Zealand) Warren Gatland	BBC
24 September 2023	Parc Olympique Lyonnais	Wales	Australia	40–6	2023 Rugby World Cup	Wales	(New Zealand) Warren Gatland	BBC
7 October 2023	Stade de la Beaujoire	Wales	Georgia	43–19	2023 Rugby World Cup	Wales	(New Zealand) Warren Gatland	BBC
14 October 2023	Stade Vélodrome	Wales	Argentina	17–29	2023 Rugby World Cup	Argentina	(New Zealand) Warren Gatland	BBC
7 November 2023	Millennium Stadium	Wales	Barbarians	49–26		Wales	(New Zealand) Warren Gatland	BBC
03 February 2024	Millennium Stadium	Wales	Scotland	26–27	2024 Six Nations Championship	Scotland	(New Zealand) Warren Gatland	BBC
10 February 2024	Twickenham Stadium	England	Wales	16–14	2024 Six Nations Championship	England	(New Zealand) Warren Gatland	BBC
24 February 2024	Aviva Stadium	Ireland	Wales	31–7	2024 Six Nations Championship	Ireland	(New Zealand) Warren Gatland	BBC
10 March 2024	Millennium Stadium	Wales	France	24–45	2024 Six Nations Championship	France	(New Zealand) Warren Gatland	BBC
16 March 2024	Millennium Stadium	Wales	Italy	21–24	2024 Six Nations Championship	Italy	(New Zealand) Warren Gatland	BBC
22 June 2024	Twickenham Stadium	South Africa	Wales	41–13		South Africa	(New Zealand) Warren Gatland	BBC
6 July 2024	Sydney Football Stadium	Australia	Wales	25–16	2024 summer tour	Australia	(New Zealand) Warren Gatland	BBC
13 July 2024	AAMI Park	Australia	Wales	36–28	2024 summer tour	Australia	(New Zealand) Warren Gatland	BBC
19 July 2024	Lang Park	Queensland Reds	Wales	35–36	2024 summer tour	Wales	(New Zealand) Warren Gatland	BBC
10 November 2024	Millennium Stadium	Wales	Fiji	19–24	2024 Autumn Internationals	Fiji	(New Zealand) Warren Gatland	BBC
17 November 2024	Millennium Stadium	Wales	Australia	20–52	2024 Autumn Internationals	Australia	(New Zealand) Warren Gatland	BBC
23 November 2024	Millennium Stadium	Wales	South Africa	12–45	2024 Autumn Internationals	South Africa	(New Zealand) Warren Gatland	BBC
31 January 2025	Stade de France	France	Wales	43–0	2025 Six Nations Championship	France	(New Zealand) Warren Gatland	
8 February 2025	Stadio Olimpico	Italy	Wales	22–15	2025 Six Nations Championship	Italy	(New Zealand) Warren Gatland	
22 February 2025	Millennium Stadium	Wales	Ireland	18–27	2025 Six Nations Championship	Ireland	(Wales) Matt Sherratt	
8 March 2025	Murrayfield Stadium	Scotland	Wales	35–29	2025 Six Nations Championship	Scotland	(Wales) Matt Sherratt	
15 March 2025	Millennium Stadium	Wales	England	14–68	2025 Six Nations Championship	England	(Wales) Matt Sherratt	
5 July 2025	Mikuni World Stadium Kitakyushu	Japan	Wales	24–19	2025 summer tour	Japan	(Wales) Matt Sherratt	
12 July 2025	Noevir Stadium Kobe	Japan	Wales	22–31	2025 summer tour	Wales	(Wales) Matt Sherratt	
9 November 2025	Millennium Stadium	Wales	Argentina	28–52	2025 Autumn Internationals	Argentina	(Wales) Steve Tandy	
15 November 2025	Millennium Stadium	Wales	Japan	24–23	2025 Autumn Internationals	Wales	(Wales) Steve Tandy	
22 November 2025	Millennium Stadium	Wales	New Zealand	26–52	2025 Autumn Internationals	New Zealand	(Wales) Steve Tandy	
29 November 2025	Millennium Stadium	Wales	South Africa	0–73	2025 Autumn Internationals	South Africa	(Wales) Steve Tandy	
7 February 2026	Twickenham Stadium	England	Wales	48–7	2026 Six Nations Championship	England	(Wales) Steve Tandy	
15 February 2026	Millennium Stadium	Wales	France	12–54	2026 Six Nations Championship	France	(Wales) Steve Tandy	
21 February 2026	Millennium Stadium	Wales	Scotland	23–26	2026 Six Nations Championship	Scotland	(Wales) Steve Tandy	
6 March 2026	Aviva Stadium	Ireland	Wales	27-17	2026 Six Nations Championship	Ireland	(Wales) Steve Tandy	
14 March 2026	Millennium Stadium	Wales	Italy	31-17	2026 Six Nations Championship	Wales	(Wales) Steve Tandy	
27 June 2026	Twickenham Stadium	Barbarians	Wales	31-33		Wales	(Wales) Steve Tandy	
4 July 2026	Cardiff City Stadium	Fiji	Wales	24–39	2026 Nations Championship	Wales	(Wales) Steve Tandy	
11 July 2026	Estadio Bicentenario	Argentina	Wales	35–21	2026 Nations Championship	Argentina	(Wales) Steve Tandy	
18 July 2026	Hollywoodbets Kings Park	South Africa	Wales	43–0	2026 Nations Championship	South Africa	(Wales) Steve Tandy	
7 November 2026	Millennium Stadium	Wales	Japan	28‒21	2026 Nations Championship	Wales	(Wales) Steve Tandy	
14 November 2026	Millennium Stadium	Wales	New Zealand	35‒28	2026 Nations Championship	Wales	(Wales) Steve Tandy	
