= History of rugby union matches between Wales and the Barbarians =

Wales and the Barbarians have played each other four times at test level; Wales have won on two occasions. In non-test meetings between the two teams, the Barbarians have been the most successful, winning four of the six encounters. Most of the matches have been played at the home of Welsh rugby in the city of Cardiff; at Cardiff Arms Park prior to the opening of the Millennium Stadium in 1999. Only two matches have been played away from the Millennium Stadium since then, at Ashton Gate Stadium in Bristol in 2004 and Twickenham Stadium in 2026.

== Summary of matches and results ==
A summary of test match results between Wales and the Barbarian Football Club
Played	Won by Wales	Won by Barbarians	Drawn	Wales points	Barbarians points
4	2	2	0	113	93

A list of all matches between Wales and the Barbarian Football Club
Match type	Date	Venue	Score	Winner	Notes
Non-test	17 April 1915	Cardiff Arms Park, Cardiff	10–26	Barbarians	
Test	6 October 1990	Cardiff Arms Park, Cardiff	24–31	Barbarians	Most points scored by Barbarians v Wales (31 points); Largest winning margin Barbarians v Wales (7 points)
Test	24 August 1996	Cardiff Arms Park, Cardiff	31–10	Wales	Most points scored by Wales v Barbarians (31 points); Largest winning margin Wales v Barbarians (21 points)
Non-test	20 May 2001	Millennium Stadium, Cardiff	38–40	Barbarians	
Non-test	29 May 2002	Millennium Stadium, Cardiff	25–40	Barbarians	
Non-test	31 May 2003	Millennium Stadium, Cardiff	35–48	Barbarians	
Non-test	26 May 2004	Ashton Gate, Bristol	0–42	Wales	
Test	4 June 2011	Millennium Stadium, Cardiff	28–31	Barbarians	Rugby World Cup warm-up: Most points scored by Barbarians v Wales (31 points)
Test	2 June 2012	Millennium Stadium, Cardiff	30–21	Wales	2012 mid-year test
Non-test	30 November 2019	Principality Stadium, Cardiff	43–33	Wales	
Non-test	4 November 2023	Principality Stadium, Cardiff	49–26	Wales	
Non-test	27 June 2026	Allianz Stadium, Twickenham	33–31	Wales	
