= 1993 France rugby union tour of South Africa =

Summary
P	W	D	L
Total
8	4	2	2
Test match
2	1	1	0
Opponent
P	W	D	L
South Africa
2	1	1	0

The 1993 France rugby union tour of South Africa was a series of eight matches played by the France national rugby union team in South Africa in June and July 1993. The French team won four matches, drew two and lost two. They won their two match international series against the South Africa national rugby union team, drawing the first game and winning the second for a one-nil series victory. The tour was marred by a serious facial injury suffered by the captain, Jean-François Tordo, who was raked by Garry Pagel in the match against Western Province. Tordo required 50 stitches and plastic surgery and took no further part in the tour.

== Results ==
Scores and results list France's points tally first.

	Date	Opponent	Location	Result	Score
Match 1	9 June	Eastern Province	Boet Erasmus Stadium, Port Elizabeth	Won	18–8
Match 2	12 June	Western Province	Newlands, Cape Town	Won	12–6
Match 3	15 June	South Africa B	Basil Kenyon Stadium, East London	Lost	22–35
Match 4	19 June	Orange Free State	Free State Stadium, Bloemfontein	Drew	22–22
Match 6	22 June	Northern Transvaal	Loftus Vefsveld, Pretoria	Lost	19–38
Match 6	26 June	SOUTH AFRICA	Kings Park Stadium, Durban	Draw	20–20
Match 7	26 June	Development XV	Welkom Stadium, Welkom	Won	38–13
Match 8	3 July	SOUTH AFRICA	Ellis Park, Johannesburg	Won	18–17

== Touring party ==
- Manager: Guy Laporte
- Coach: Pierre Berbizier
- Assistant coach: Christophe Mombet
- Captain: Jean-François Tordo, replaced by Olivier Roumat

=== Full backs ===
- Jean-Luc Sadourny (US Colomiers)
- Olivier Campan (SU Agen Lot-et-Garonne)

=== Three-quarters ===
- Peyo Hontas (Biarritz Olympique)
- Philippe Saint-André (AS Montferrand)
- Philippe Bernat-Salles (Pau)
- David Berty (Stade Toulousain)
- Philippe Sella (SU Agen Lot-et-Garonne)
- Thierry Lacroix (US Dax)
- Hervé Couffignal (US Colomiers)
- Pierre Bondouy (RC Narbonne)

=== Half-backs ===
- Alain Penaud (CA Brive)
- Pierre Montlaur (SU Agen Lot-et-Garonne)
- Aubin Hueber (RC Toulonnais)
- Jérôme Cazalbou (Stade Toulousain)

=== Forwards ===
- Louis Armary (FC Lourdes
- Laurent Seigne (SU Agen Lot-et-Garonne
- Stéphane Graou (FC Auch Gers)
- Emmanuel Ménieu (Stade Bordelais)
- Jean-François Tordo (Nice)
- Jean-Michel Gonzalez (Aviron Bayonnais)
- Olivier Roumat (US Dax)
- Abdelatif Benazzi (SU Agen Lot-et-Garonne)
- Olivier Merle (FC Grenoble)
- Yann Lemeur (Racing Club de France)
- Philippe Benetton (SU Agen Lot-et-Garonne)
- Laurent Cabannes (Racing Club de France)
- Léon Loppy (RC Toulonnais
- Jean-Marc Lhermet (AS Montferrand
- Marc Cécillon (CS Bourgoin-Jallieu)
- Xavier Blond (Racing Club de France)
- Laurent Vergé (CA Bordeaux-Bègles Gironde) replacement during tour
- Christophe Deslandes (Racing Club de France) replacement during tour
