= History of rugby union matches between France and New Zealand =

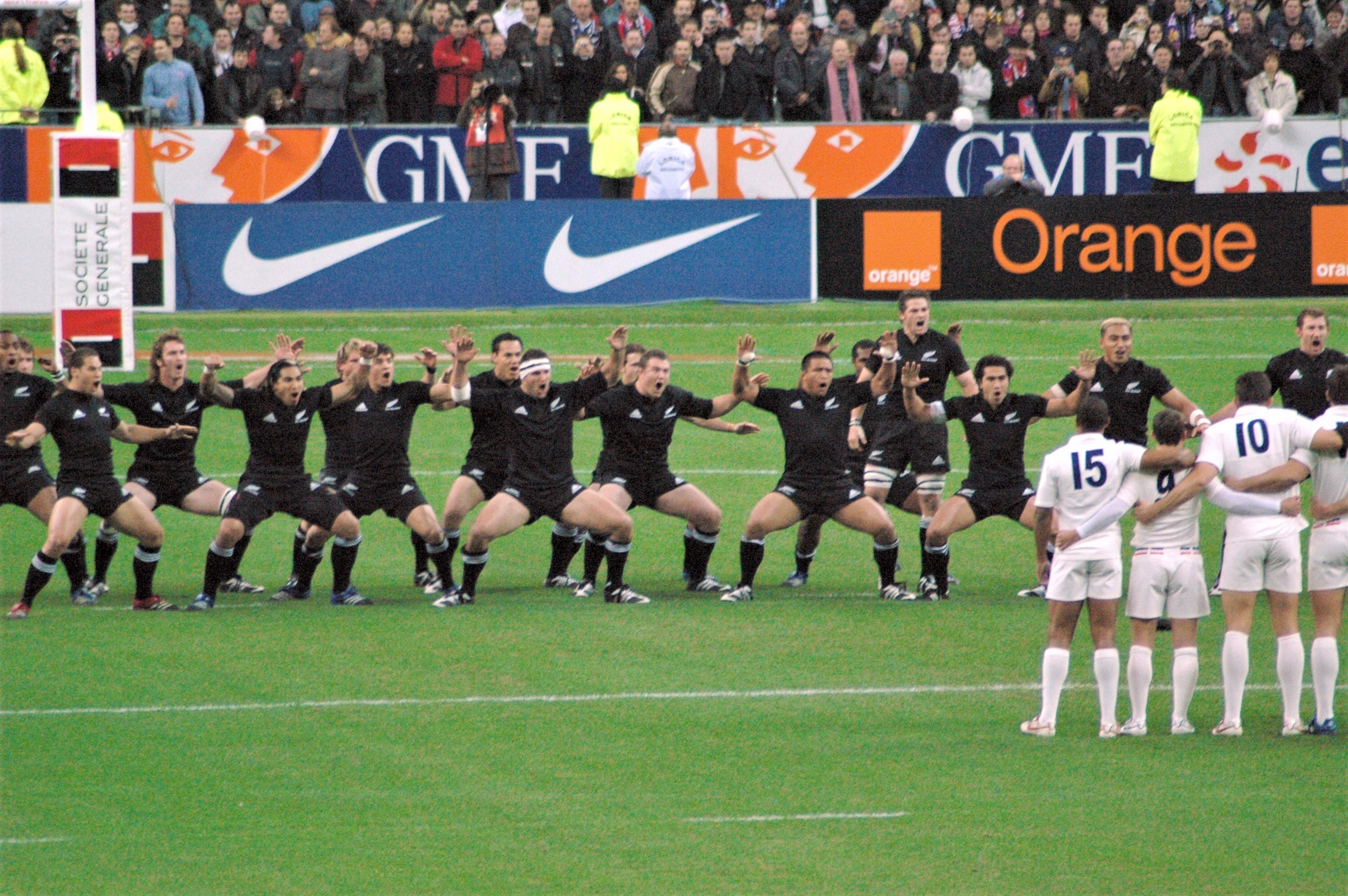
The All Blacks performing a haka prior to a test match against France in 2006

The national rugby union teams of France and New Zealand (the All Blacks) have been playing each other for over a century. The first encounter, during the historic 1905–1906 All Blacks tour of Europe and North America, which was also France's first test, took place in Paris in January 1906 and was won by New Zealand 38–8. It was not until their third meeting, in 1954, that France secured their first win over New Zealand 3–0.

France first toured New Zealand in 1961, before any of the Home Nations, with the All Blacks winning all three tests. The All Blacks' first full tour of France was in 1977,^{[i]} when they won one of the two tests. France first defeated the All Blacks in New Zealand on Bastille Day 1979. France achieved a first series win in New Zealand in 1994, when they won both tests. The two teams have contested the Dave Gallaher Trophy since 2000.

The teams' World Cup history includes eight matches, the joint most for any pair of teams. They have played two tournament finals, in 1987 and 2011 (both at Eden Park and both won by New Zealand).

Overall, the All Blacks have won 51 tests against France's 15, with one match drawn. The largest winning margin in a test match between the countries was a 61–10 victory to the All Blacks at Westpac Stadium in Wellington in 2007. The most career points scored by members of either team is 92 by Andrew Mehrtens, and he also holds the record for most points in one match with 29 points.

Despite the vastly superior win record of New Zealand, France's 15 wins against the All Blacks is more than any other Northern Hemisphere opponent has achieved. France are sometimes called the "bogey" team of New Zealand, known for having inconsistent results in regular test matches, but have proven to be fierce opponents in the knockout stage of the Rugby World Cup. All Black campaigns in The Rugby World Cup were halted by defeats to France in 1999 and 2007, and were nearly upset again in 2011 with a very narrow 8–7 victory in the final.

== History ==
=== Early meetings (1905–1925) ===
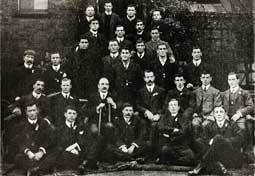
The Original All Blacks that toured the Northern Hemisphere and played against France in their first ever test match

The first-ever New Zealand tour to the Northern Hemisphere was in 1905–06. It was also the first time they wore a black strip and the first time they performed the haka. The team – known today as "The Original All Blacks" – played various club and national sides throughout the British Isles before taking on France on 1 January 1906. This was France's first test and was held at Parc des Princes, Paris. The All Blacks scored ten tries, including six in the second half, to France's two, and won 38–8. Despite the scoreline, France's two tries were more than any previous team had scored against the All Blacks on tour. Commenting on the state of French rugby in their book The Complete Rugby Footballer, Original All Blacks Dave Gallaher and Billy Stead wrote: "We are strongly of the opinion that the game will spread in their country and that in the course of time they will put a team in the field which will command the utmost respect of any other."

The 1924–25 All Blacks' Invincibles tour included a test against France.^{[ii]} The teams met at the Stade des Ponts Jumeaux in Toulouse on 18 January 1925. Although French rugby had improved since 1906,^{[iii]} the All Blacks still won 30–6, with France scoring two tries. All Blacks' captain Cliff Porter said of France "Your forwards gave us a lot of bother. Your three-quarters were not so good."

In 1926, France lost to the New Zealand Maori. Perhaps the "most celebrated Maori side in history", they undertook a seven-month 1926–27 tour of Australia, Ceylon, France, Wales and Canada, playing 38 matches, winning 29 and losing seven, with two draws. In total, the Maori scored 712 points while conceding 215. This was the last match between a New Zealand representative team and France for nearly three decades. In 1932 the International Rugby Football Board (IRB) expelled France from the Five Nations Championship for breaching the professionalism rules in its domestic club competition. Consequently, the All Blacks did not face France during their 1935 British Isles' tour. Although France was readmitted in 1939, the Second World War intervened, suspending international competition.

In 1946, France played two matches against a team selected from the New Zealand Expeditionary Force, nicknamed the "Khaki All Blacks". Despite the team not being a representative New Zealand side, they included many future All Blacks. The games took place on 10 March at Stade Colombes, Paris, and on 24 March at Wallon Stadium, Toulouse. The Khaki All Blacks won both (14–9 and 13–10).

=== Post war (1954–1968) ===
The 1954 match at Stade Colombes, Paris, was dominated by the All Blacks who had the majority of possession and territory. Despite this, France scored in the 35th minute after the ball was lost by All Blacks' half-back Keith Davis 40 metres (130 ft) from France's line. The ball was picked up by French number eight Robert Baulon who passed to Paul Labadie. Labadie then passed to French captain Jean Prat who scored a try, giving France a 3–0 lead that the All Blacks failed to close. Although New Zealand relentlessly attacked the French line – and made several drop goal and penalty attempts – the French defence held, earning France their first win (3–0) over the All Blacks.

France first toured New Zealand in 1961 – before any of the Home Nations. The first test at Eden Park was won 13–6 by the All Blacks after they scored two converted tries and a penalty. France's first five-eighth Pierre Albaladejo kicked all of France's points with two drop goals, prompting the New Zealanders to nickname him "Monsieur Drop". The second test of the tour was played at Athletic Park in Wellington. The wind was very strong and neither team scored during the first half. In the second, playing into the wind, France scored a try to lead 3–0. The All Blacks' Kel Tremain responded with a try. In one of the best conversions of his career, Don Clarke kicked almost parallel to the goal-line, relying on the strong wind to gust the ball over the posts. The Blacks won 5–3. Although the All Blacks won the final test in Christchurch 32–3 to take the series, the tour had a positive influence in France where it was broadcast on national television via satellite, popularising the sport beyond its traditional heartland of the southwest.

The next two matches between the teams were both in Paris. The All Blacks won the first 12–3 in 1964 after tries from Ralph Caulton and Ken Gray. In the next match, in 1967, the All Blacks were coached by Fred Allen and captained by Brian Lochore; they won 21–15.

In 1968, following their first Five Nations Grand Slam, France toured Australia and New Zealand. They were defeated in their test against Australia and in all three against the All Blacks. The All Blacks' side was particularly strong and won all its tests between 1965 and 1970. France's touring losses presaged a string of defeats that did not end until they drew against Wales in the 1969 Five Nations (in which France finished last).

=== Full amateur tours (1970–1994) ===
France achieved only their second test victory over the All Blacks in 1973 at Parc des Princes, Paris. The All Blacks had defeated England, Scotland and Wales, and drawn with Ireland on their 1973 tour and France was their last test. France won 13–6, and scored two tries to nil, with two penalties the only points from the All Blacks. In 1977 the All Blacks made their first-ever full tour of France. France won the first test in Toulouse and the All Blacks the second in Paris. France then reciprocated and toured New Zealand in 1979. This time, neutral referees were appointed for the first time. The All Blacks won the first test 23–9 at Lancaster Park. However, in the second test, France upset the All Blacks by winning 24–19 on Bastille Day at Eden Park. The victory was France's first win in New Zealand over the All Blacks.

The 1980s saw many France – New Zealand tests. The first two were in 1981 when the All Blacks toured France, visiting in Toulouse and Paris; the All Blacks won both tests, 13–9 and 18–6 respectively. In 1984, France visited New Zealand for two tests. They lost the first, at Lancaster Park, 10–9 (despite repeated French drop goal attempts late in the match, nearly all in front of the posts from various distances) and the second, at Eden Park, 31–18.

In 1986, France played a one-off test in New Zealand, at Lancaster Park. Many top All Blacks were serving a two-month suspension for participating in the rebel Cavaliers tour to South Africa. The team that faced France became known as the "Baby Blacks" as all bar two of them were either making their test début or were very inexperienced. The Baby Blacks upset France 18–9 in front of 24,000 spectators; the only try coming from number eight Mike Brewer.

Later in 1986, the bans served, the full All Blacks toured France. They won the first test, in Toulouse, 19–7. Their next match, at Nantes, became known as "the battle of Nantes". France played aggressively and tried to intimidate the All Blacks. All Black Buck Shelford had his scrotum rucked in the twentieth minute that required stitches while he was still on the field. He was later knocked out, losing several teeth in the process, and did not finish the match. The aggressive display by France paid off and they won 16–3.

The following year France and the All Blacks met in the final of the inaugural Rugby World Cup. The tournament was co-hosted by New Zealand and Australia and the final was held at Eden Park. The All Blacks were captained by David Kirk and went on to win their first World Cup 29–9. According to the All Blacks' coach at the time, Brian Lochore, the previous year's loss in Nantes was the catalyst for their World Cup victory. Shelford said of the match "We wanted to play them in the final because we wanted revenge". The match also helped improve the diplomatic and political rift between France and New Zealand caused by the 1985 bombing of the Rainbow Warrior by French Secret Service agents.

France toured New Zealand in 1989 and played a two test series. They lost both tests; the first 25–17 at Lancaster Park, and the second 34–20 at Eden Park. In both tests the All Blacks led at the half time break, with France responding by scoring most of their points during the first 15 minutes of the second half before the All Blacks counter-attacked to win in the last quarter. The All Blacks' reciprocal tour of France came in 1990. Again two tests were played and again they were won by the All Blacks; 24–3 at Nantes, and 30–12 at the Parc de Princes. The All Blacks first-five eighth Grant Fox, dominated both matches, scoring 16 points in the first test, and 22 points in the second.

The next tour was of New Zealand by France in 1994. In a major upset for New Zealand rugby, France took the first test 22–8 at Lancaster Park, coinciding with Frenchman Philippe Sella's hundredth match for his country. Sella said of the game "But this historic victory for my 100th cap, with a score I never imagined – that's one of my really great, great memories". The second and final test on tour was at Eden Park on 3 July 1994. The All Blacks were winning 20–16 with three minutes remaining after Matthew Cooper had kicked a penalty. The French counter-attacked and ran the ball the length of the field from their own in-goal area to win. The ball was handled by nine French players before the try was scored by Jean-Luc Sadourny. French captain Philippe Saint-Andre called it "a counter-attack from the end of the world", and it was then labelled l'essai du bout du monde (the try from the end of the world). The try gave France a 23–20 win and a 2–0 series win over the All Blacks. In 2003, Daily Telegraph readers voted the try the fourth best of all time in either rugby union or rugby league.

=== Professional era (from 1995) ===
On 11 November 1995, France set a record when they defeated the All Blacks 22–15 at Toulouse—their third consecutive victory over the New Zealanders. A week later, on 18 November, at the Parc des Princes in Paris, the All Blacks took their revenge, inflicting a resounding 37–12 defeat. It was not until 1999 that the two teams met again, in a one-off test at Athletic Park in Wellington. The All Blacks won 54–7; at the time France's largest ever loss. Tana Umaga scored three tries and Andrew Mehrtens kicked 19 points in the match.

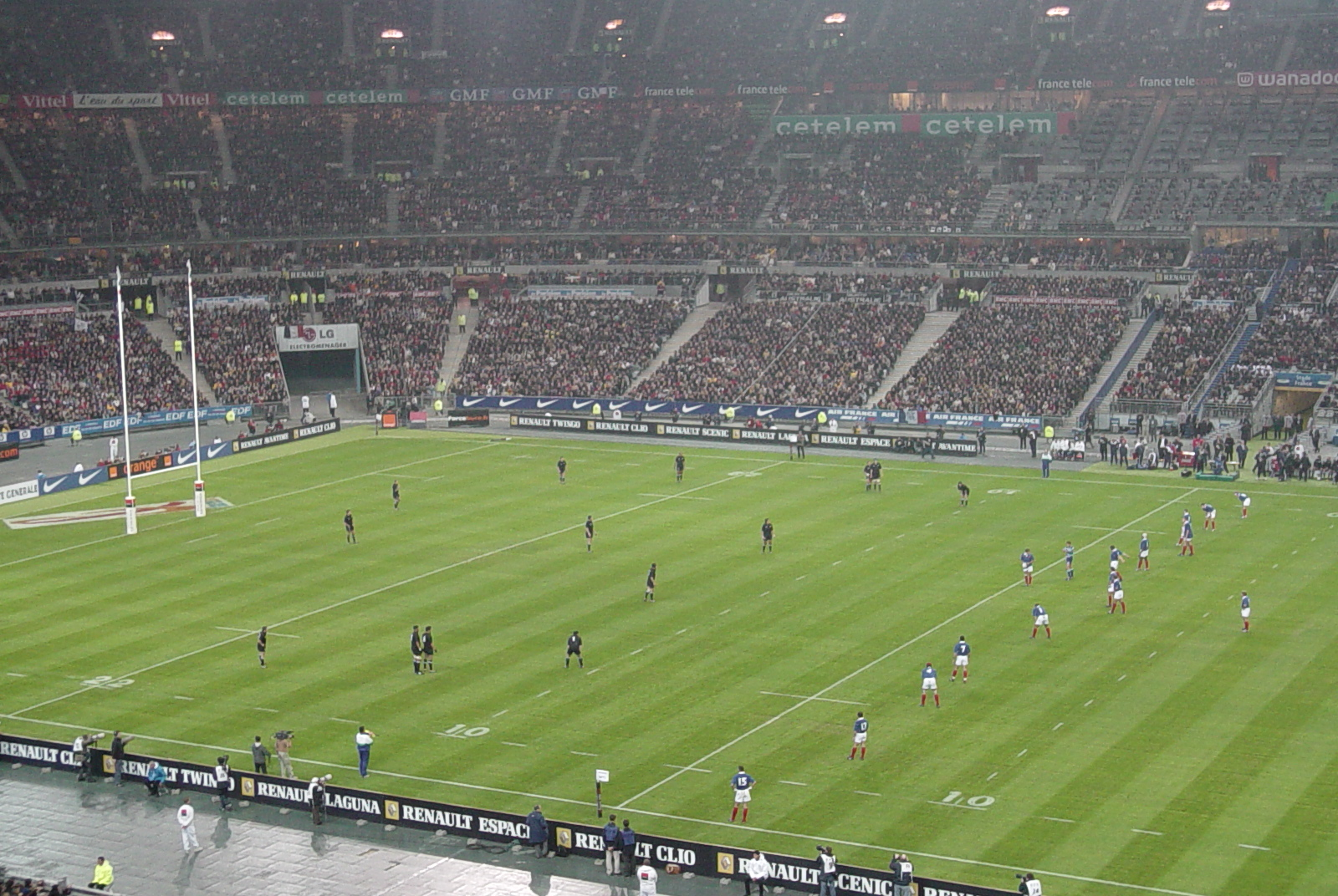
The All Blacks playing France in 2002

After their Athletic Park victory, the All Blacks were heavy favourites to win when they met France in the semi-finals of the 1999 Rugby World Cup. The game was played at the neutral venue of Twickenham Stadium on 31 October 1999. The All Blacks led 24–10 seven minutes into the second half after two tries (both from Jonah Lomu). France then scored two penalties and two drop goals to first five-eighth Christophe Lamaison to reduce the All Blacks' lead to 24–22 with 25 minutes remaining. Scrum-half Fabien Galthié chip kicked the ball to Christophe Dominici who then scored. Another Lamaison kick set up a try for centre Richard Dourthe, which Lamaison converted, to take France into the lead, 36–24. France scored another try in the remaining five minutes, and although the All Blacks scored a last-minute try France won 43–31. Lamaison had scored 28 points, and a full house – a try, conversion, penalty and drop goal all in one match. Many have called this match "the greatest game in World Cup history".

The Dave Gallaher Trophy was introduced in 2000 to be contested between the two teams. It was named in memory of All Blacks captain Dave Gallaher who captained the All Blacks against France in 1906 and who died at the Battle of Passchendaele. The Cup was first contested on Armistice Day (11 November) 2000. The All Blacks won 39–26 and scored two tries while Andrew Mehrtens scored nine penalties. The two met again the following week and this time France won 42–33, but as only the first test counted towards the trophy the All Blacks retained it.

The countries met in one-off tests in 2001, 2002 and 2003. The 2001 test was won 37–12 by the All Blacks, the 2002 test was a 20 all draw and in 2003 the All Blacks won 31–23 at Jade Stadium. They met again in 2003 at the Rugby World Cup in Sydney. The match was a third-fourth play-off game and was won 40–13 by the All Blacks. In 2004 they met in a one-off test in Paris. The 2004 test was the first between the two teams with Graham Henry as All Blacks coach. France were 2004 Six Nations Champions, but were defeated by five tries to nil. The final score was a 45–6 win to the All Blacks; a record at the time. They met in France in 2006 – this time for a two-test series. The first test was played in Lyon on Armistice Day. The All Blacks defeated France 46–3 which was a record defeat for them at home. This was despite the All Blacks' team not being their strongest available. Following the defeat France's manager Jo Maso said that the All Blacks played the match, "for all the New Zealanders who died during the two World Wars in Europe". The following week the two teams met in Paris, this time to commemorate the centennial of the first ever All Blacks versus France test. Despite fielding what coach Graham Henry described as his best team, the All Blacks achieved a less notable 23–11 victory.

The next year France visited New Zealand for a two-test series. The final rounds of the 2006–07 Top 14 season conflicted with the tour, so France sent a test team short of 30 of their top players. With their weakened squad, the team was labelled "France C" by the New Zealand media. Featuring six new caps, France were defeated 42–11 in the first test at Eden Park. The second test was played the following week in Wellington, and the All Blacks achieved their largest ever victory over France with a 61–10 win. The defeat was France's heaviest in their history.

France hosted the 2007 World Cup, and the two teams met in the tournament quarter-finals. Despite France's hosting of the tournament, the match was held at the Millennium Stadium in Cardiff, Wales. The match was won by France 20–18, and involved several controversial decisions by referee Wayne Barnes, who subsequently received death threats from some fans. France scored one try after the sin binning of All Blacks second five-eighth Luke McAlister, and another from a forward pass unseen by the referee. The All Blacks were strongly criticised for not attempting a drop goal in the game's final minutes. Their performance was analysed by Palmerston North based company Verusco who had analysed 1,500 games since 2000. They discovered that the All Blacks made 57 tackles to France's 269, and they had 66 percent possession and 60 percent territory. The playing time, that is time the ball is in play, was the longest of any game Verusco had ever recorded. An 'Independent Review of the 2007 Rugby World Cup Campaign', conducted by Russel McVeagh lawyers and SPARC (Sport and Recreation New Zealand), found that Barnes and the touch judges had a significant impact on the result of the match. The report states that "The penalty count was 10-2 against the All Blacks, with none awarded in the second half, despite dominance in territory and possession (which statistically should result in penalties awarded to the dominant side). On anyone's account the referees and touch judges made mistakes which worked against the All Blacks." Outside New Zealand and France, the focus was on the fact that, as in 1999, France had pulled off what The Guardian described as another "incredible triumph against the odds."

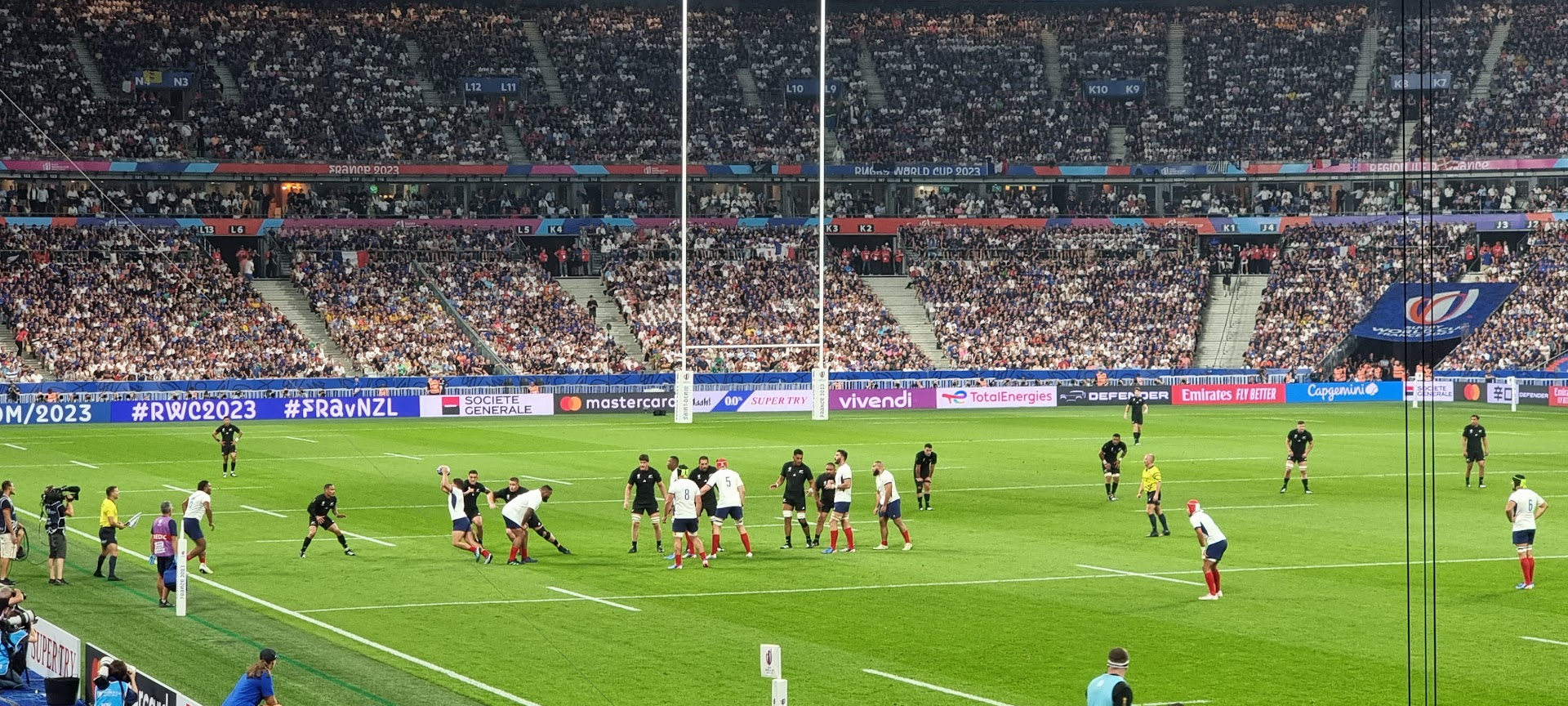
2023 Rugby World Cup match between France and New Zealand at Stade de France.

In 2011, New Zealand hosted the Rugby World Cup. Unusually, France and New Zealand played twice at the tournament - both times at Eden Park. Both teams were in Pool A, and on September 24 New Zealand won their first encounter 37-17. New Zealand were pool winners, with France second. On either side of the draw for the knockout stage, both teams made the final on October 23. New Zealand won 8-7. The match involved several controversial decisions by referee Craig Joubert, nonetheless for the second time New Zealand won a home World Cup with France runners up.

== Summary ==
As of July 2026, New Zealand and France have played 68 tests. The All Blacks have won 52, France 15, and one has been drawn. Only four matches have been played at neutral venues; the 1999 World Cup semi-final at Twickenham, London, the 2003 World Cup third/fourth play-off match at Stadium Australia in Sydney, and the 2007 and 2015 World Cup quarter-finals at Millennium Stadium in Cardiff. New Zealand have scored considerably more points than France both in France and New Zealand, and at neutral venues - although at neutral venues France have won two of the four matches. A summary of the test match statistics can be found below.

=== Overview ===
Details	Played	Won by France	Won by New Zealand	Drawn	France points	New Zealand points
In France	29	9	19	1	429	710
In New Zealand	35	4	31	0	475	954
Neutral venue	4	2	2	0	89	151
Overall	68	15	52	1	993	1,815

=== Rugby World Cup matches ===
New Zealand and France have played eight Rugby World Cup games, the joint-most of any pair of teams, including six play-off matches. Five have been won by New Zealand and three by France. France's wins knocked New Zealand out of the 1999 and 2007 tournaments at the semi-final and quarter-final stage respectively. France is the first team to hand New Zealand their first loss in a pool match at a Rugby World Cup when they defeated them in 2023. New Zealand's first two successful campaigns (1987 and 2011) ended with wins over France, both at Eden Park. New Zealand's other victories have come in a quarter-final (2015), a pool match (2011, again at Eden Park) and the 2003 third-place playoff.

Details	Played	Won by France	Won by New Zealand	Drawn	France points	NZ points	Years
Group matches	2	1	1	0	44	50	2011, 2023
Quarter-finals	2	1	1	0	33	80	2007, 2015
Semi-finals	1	1	0	0	43	31	1999
Bronze finals	1	0	1	0	13	40	2003
Finals	2	0	2	0	16	37	1987, 2011
Overall	8	3	5	0	149	238	

=== Records ===
Note: Date shown in brackets indicates when the record was or last set.

Record	France	New Zealand
Longest winning streak	3 (26 Jun 1994–18 Nov 1995, 20 Nov 2021–5 Jul 2025)	14 (20 Jun 2009–20 Nov 2021)
Most points for
Home	42 (18 November 2000)	61 (9 June 2007)
Away	43 (31 October 1999)	62 (17 October 2015)
Largest winning margin
Home	15 (20 November 2021)	51 (9 June 2007)
Away	14 (26 June 1994)	49 (17 October 2015)

== Results ==
No.	Date	Venue	Score	Winner	Competition	Match report
1	1 January 1906	Parc des Princes, Paris	8–38	New Zealand	The Original All Blacks	
2	18 January 1925	Stade des Ponts Jumeaux, Toulouse	6–30	New Zealand	1924–25 New Zealand tour	
3	27 February 1954	Yves-du-Manoir, Colombes	3–0	France	1953–54 New Zealand tour	
4	22 July 1961	Eden Park, Auckland	13–6	New Zealand	1961 French tour of New Zealand	
5	5 August 1961	Athletic Park, Wellington	5–3	New Zealand	1961 French tour of New Zealand	
6	19 August 1961	Lancaster Park, Christchurch	32–3	New Zealand	1961 French tour of New Zealand	
7	8 February 1964	Yves-du-Manoir, Colombes	3–12	New Zealand	1963–64 New Zealand tour	
8	25 November 1967	Yves-du-Manoir, Colombes	15–21	New Zealand	1967 New Zealand tour	
9	13 July 1968	Lancaster Park, Christchurch	12–9	New Zealand	1968 French tour of New Zealand	
10	27 July 1968	Athletic Park, Wellington	9–3	New Zealand	1968 French tour of New Zealand	
11	10 August 1968	Eden Park, Auckland	19–12	New Zealand	1968 French tour of New Zealand	
12	10 February 1973	Parc des Princes, Paris	13–6	France	1972–73 New Zealand tour	
13	11 November 1977	Stadium Municipal, Toulouse	18–13	France	1977 New Zealand tour	
14	19 November 1977	Parc des Princes, Paris	3–15	New Zealand	1977 New Zealand tour	
15	7 July 1979	Lancaster Park, Christchurch	23–9	New Zealand	1979 French tour of Fiji & New Zealand	
16	14 July 1979	Eden Park, Auckland	19–24	France	1979 French tour of Fiji & New Zealand	
17	14 November 1981	Stadium Municipal, Toulouse	9 –13	New Zealand	1981 New Zealand tour	
18	21 November 1981	Parc des Princes, Paris	6–18	New Zealand	1981 New Zealand tour	
19	16 June 1984	Lancaster Park, Christchurch	10–9	New Zealand	1984 French tour of New Zealand	
20	23 June 1984	Eden Park, Auckland	31–18	New Zealand	1984 French tour of New Zealand	
21	28 June 1986	Lancaster Park, Christchurch	18–9	New Zealand	1986 France tour	
22	8 November 1986	Stadium Municipal, Toulouse	7–19	New Zealand	1986 New Zealand tour of France	
23	15 November 1986	Stade de la Beaujoire, Nantes	16–3	France	1986 New Zealand tour of France	
24	20 June 1987	Eden Park, Auckland	29–9	New Zealand	1987 Rugby World Cup final	
25	17 June 1989	Lancaster Park, Christchurch	25– 17	New Zealand	1989 French tour of New Zealand	
26	1 July 1989	Eden Park, Auckland	34–20	New Zealand	1989 French tour of New Zealand	
27	3 November 1990	Stade de la Beaujoire, Nantes	3–24	New Zealand	1990 New Zealand tour of France	
28	10 November 1990	Parc des Princes, Paris	12–30	New Zealand	1990 New Zealand tour of France	
29	26 June 1994	Lancaster Park, Christchurch	8–22	France	1994 French tour	
30	3 July 1994	Eden Park, Auckland	20–23	France	1994 French tour	NZH
31	11 November 1995	Stadium Municipal, Toulouse	22–15	France	1995 New Zealand tour	
32	18 November 1995	Parc des Princes, Paris	12–37	New Zealand	1995 New Zealand tour	
33	26 June 1999	Athletic Park, Wellington	54–7	New Zealand	1999 French tour	
34	31 October 1999	Twickenham, London, England	31–43	France	1999 Rugby World Cup	BBC
35	11 November 2000	Stade de France, Saint-Denis	26–39	New Zealand	2000 end of year test	BBC
36	18 November 2000	Stade Vélodrome, Marseille	42–33	France	2000 end of year test	BBC
37	30 June 2001	WestpacTrust Stadium, Wellington	37–12	New Zealand	2001 French tour	BBC
38	16 November 2002	Stade de France, Saint-Denis	20–20	draw	2002 New Zealand tour of Europe	BBC
39	28 June 2003	Jade Stadium, Christchurch	31–23	New Zealand	2003 French tour	BBC
40	20 November 2003	Stadium Australia, Sydney, Australia	40–13	New Zealand	2003 Rugby World Cup	BBC
41	27 November 2004	Stade de France, Saint-Denis	6–45	New Zealand	2004 end of year rugby union tests	BBC
42	11 November 2006	Stade de Gerland, Lyon	3–47	New Zealand	2006 end of year rugby union tests	BBC
43	18 November 2006	Stade de France, Saint-Denis	11–23	New Zealand	2006 end of year rugby union tests	BBC
44	2 June 2007	Eden Park, Auckland	42–11	New Zealand	2007 mid-year rugby union tests	TG
45	9 June 2007	Westpac Stadium, Wellington	61–10	New Zealand	2007 mid-year rugby union tests	BBC
46	6 October 2007	Millennium Stadium, Cardiff, Wales	18–20	France	2007 Rugby World Cup	BBC
47	13 June 2009	Carisbrook, Dunedin	22–27	France	2009 mid-year rugby union tests	BBC
48	20 June 2009	Westpac Stadium, Wellington	14–10	New Zealand	2009 mid-year rugby union tests	BBC
49	28 November 2009	Stade Vélodrome, Marseille	12–39	New Zealand	2009 end of year rugby union tests	BBC
50	24 September 2011	Eden Park, Auckland	37–17	New Zealand	2011 Rugby World Cup	BBC
51	23 October 2011	Eden Park, Auckland	8–7	New Zealand	2011 Rugby World Cup final	BBC
52	8 June 2013	Eden Park, Auckland	23–13	New Zealand	2013 French tour to New Zealand	ABC
53	15 June 2013	Rugby League Park, Christchurch	30–0	New Zealand	2013 French tour to New Zealand	BBC
54	22 June 2013	Yarrow Stadium, New Plymouth	24–9	New Zealand	2013 French tour to New Zealand	BBC
55	9 November 2013	Stade de France, Saint-Denis	19–26	New Zealand	2013 end-of year test	TG
56	17 October 2015	Millennium Stadium, Cardiff, Wales	62–13	New Zealand	2015 Rugby World Cup quarter-final	
57	26 November 2016	Stade de France, Saint-Denis	19–24	New Zealand	2016 end-of year test	
58	11 November 2017	Stade de France, Saint-Denis	18–38	New Zealand	2017 end-of year test	
59	9 June 2018	Eden Park, Auckland	52–11	New Zealand	2018 French tour to New Zealand	
60	16 June 2018	Westpac Stadium, Wellington	26–13	New Zealand	2018 French tour to New Zealand	
61	23 June 2018	Forsyth Barr Stadium, Dunedin	49–14	New Zealand	2018 French tour to New Zealand	
62	20 November 2021	Stade de France, Saint-Denis	40–25	France	2021 end-of year test	BBC
63	8 September 2023	Stade de France, Saint-Denis	27–13	France	2023 Rugby World Cup	BBC
64	16 November 2024	Stade de France, Saint-Denis	30–29	France	2024 Autumn International	BBC
65	5 July 2025	Forsyth Barr Stadium, Dunedin	31–27	New Zealand	2025 French tour to New Zealand	BBC
66	12 July 2025	Sky Stadium, Wellington	43–17	New Zealand	2025 French tour to New Zealand	BBC
67	19 July 2025	Waikato Stadium, Hamilton	29–19	New Zealand	2025 French tour to New Zealand	BBC
68	4 July 2026	Te Kaha, Christchurch	34–32	New Zealand	2026 Nations Championship	BBC

== XV results ==
Below is a list of matches that France and New Zealand opted not to give full test match status.

No.	Date	Venue	Score	Winner	Competition	Match report
1	14 November 2017	Parc Olympique Lyonnais, Lyon	23–28	New Zealand XV	2017 Autumn International	

== List of series ==
Played	Won by France	Won by New Zealand	Drawn
18	1	11	6

Year	France	New Zealand	Series winner	Dave Gallaher Trophy
(New Zealand) 1961	0	3	New Zealand	N/A
(New Zealand) 1968	0	3	New Zealand	N/A
(France) 1977	1	1	draw	N/A
(New Zealand) 1979	1	1	draw	N/A
(France) 1981	0	2	New Zealand	N/A
(New Zealand) 1984	0	2	New Zealand	N/A
(France) 1986	1	1	draw	N/A
(New Zealand) 1989	0	2	New Zealand	N/A
(France) 1990	0	2	New Zealand	N/A
(New Zealand) 1994	2	0	France	N/A
(France) 1995	1	1	draw	N/A
(France) 2000	1	1	draw	New Zealand
(France) 2006	0	2	New Zealand	
(New Zealand) 2007	0	2	New Zealand	
(New Zealand) 2009	1	1	draw	France
(New Zealand) 2013	0	3	New Zealand	
(New Zealand) 2018	0	3	New Zealand	
(New Zealand) 2025	0	3	New Zealand	

== See also ==
- History of the French national rugby union team
- All Blacks at the Rugby World Cup
