= 1989–90 French Rugby Union Championship =

French Rugby Championship 1989–90
- Countries: France
- Number of teams: 80 teams
- Champions: Racing
- Runners-up: Agen

Le Racing won The 1988–89 French Rugby Union Championship [after beating Agen in the final.

Le Racing won his first bouclier de Brennus from 1959

== Formula ==
- The tournament was played by 80 clubs divided in sixteen pools of five. .
- The two better of each pool (a sum of 32 clubs) were admitted to the group A to play for the title
- In the second round th e32 clubs of group A were divided in four pools of eight.
- The four better of each pool of group A (16 clubs) were qualified to play the knockout stage

== Group A qualification round to knockout stage ==
The teams are listed as the ranking, in bold the teams admitted to "last 16" round.

**Pool 1**

- **Dax**
- **Grenoble**
- **US Colomiers**
- **Auch**
- Chalon
- La Rochelle
- Blagnac SCR
- Paris Université Club

**Pool 3**

- **Agen**
- **Béziers**
- **Toulon**
- **Nîmes**
- RRC Nice
- Lourdes
- Hagetmau
- Cognac

**Pool 2**

- **Racing**
- **Montferrand**
- **Bègles-Bordeaux**
- **Biarritz**
- Bayonne
- Bourgoin-Jallieu
- Graulhet
- Voiron

**Pool 4**

- **Toulouse**
- **Narbonne**
- **Brive**
- **Castres**
- Stadoceste
- Tyrosse
- Perpignan
- FCS Rumilly

== "Last 16" ==
In bold the clubs qualified for the quarter of finals.

Team 1	Team 2	1st match	2nd match
Nîmes	**Toulouse**	6-13	3-33
Béziers	**Narbonne**	10-13	12-9
Castres	**Racing**	6-9	6-40
Brive	**Grenoble**	19-12	0-28
US Colomiers	**Toulon**	6-3	12-30
**Agen**	Auch	45-3	28-3
**Montferrand**	Bègles-Bordeaux	31-18	12-21
Biarritz	**Dax**	18-18	12-29

== Quarter of finals ==
In bold the clubs qualified for the next round

Team 1	Team 2	Results
**Toulouse**	Narbonne	**10-9**
**Racing**	Grenoble	**27-21**
Toulon	**Agen**	**0-6**
**Montferrand**	Dax	**34-12**

== Semifinals ==
Team 1	Team 2	Results
Toulose	**Racing**	**14-21**
**Agen**	Montferrand	**9-3**

== Final ==
26 May 1990

**Racing Club de France**	**22 – 12 (after extra time)**	**Agen**
Try: Cabannes; Abadie; Con: Pouyau; Pen: Pouyau (2); Lafond; Abadie		Pen: Campan; Montlaur (2); Drop: Montlaur

Parc des Princes, Paris
Attendance: 45,069
Referee: Claude Debat

FB	15	(France) Jean-Baptiste Lafond
RW	14	(France) Philippe Guillard
OC	13	(France) Éric Blanc
IC	12	(France) Franck Mesnel
LW	11	(France) Geofrey Abadie
FH	10	(France) Didier Pouyau
SH	9	(France) Jean-Philippe Saffore
N8	8	(France) Christophe Deslandes
OF	7	(France) Laurent Cabannes
BF	6	(France) Xavier Blond	(substituted off) 75'
RL	5	(France) Patrick Serrière (c)
LL	4	(France) Michel Tachdjian
TP	3	(France) Philippe Voisin	(substituted off) 43'
HK	2	(France) Jean-Pierre Genet
LP	1	(France) Laurent Bénézech
Substitutions:
HK	16	(France) Philippe Dubreuille
PR	17	(South Africa) Murray Dawson	(substituted on) 43'
FL	18	(France) Éric Dalle	(substituted on) 75'
SH	19	(France) Stéphane Jourdan
WG	20	(France) Karim Abbou
CE	21	(France) Jean-Luc Pelaez
Coach:
(France) Christian Lanta

FB	15	(France) Bernard Lacombe
RW	14	(France) Olivier Campan
OC	13	(France) Philippe Sella
IC	12	(France) Patrick Schattel
LW	11	(France) Éric Gleyze
FH	10	(France) Pierre Montlaur
SH	9	(France) Pierre Berbizier (c)
N8	8	(France) Dominique Erbani
OF	7	(France) Philippe Benetton
BF	6	(France) Jacques Gratton
RL	5	(France) Bernard Mazzer	Substituted off
LL	4	(France) Abdelatif Benazzi
TP	3	(France) Laurent Seigne
HK	2	(France) Philippe Berbizier	(substituted off) 81'
LP	1	(France) Jean-Louis Tolot
Substitutions:
PR	16	(France) Grégoire Lascubé	(substituted on) 81'
LK	17	(France) Patrick Pujade	Substituted on
FL	18	(France) Philippe Berniès
FL	19	(France) Frédéric Maffre
SH	20	(France) Michel Murat
CE	21	(France) Guillaume Bouic
Coach:
(France) Michel Couturas
