= 1986–87 French Rugby Union Championship =

French Rugby Championship 1986–87
- Countries: France
- Number of teams: 40 teams
- Champions: Toulon (2nd title)
- Runners-up: Racing Paris

The 1986–87 French Rugby Union Championship was won by Toulon that beat Racing Paris in the final.

== Formula ==
The 40 clubs were divided in 4 pools of ten.

The first five of pool 1 and 2 and the first three of pool 3 and 4, were qualified for knock out stages.

This formula will be used only for this year.

== Qualification round ==
The teams are listed as the ranking, in bold the teams admitted to "last 16" round.

**Pool 1**

- **Toulouse**
- **Brive**
- **Montferrand**
- **Béziers**
- **Graulhet**
- Grenoble
- Narbonne
- Aurillac
- RRC Nice
- Romans

**Pool 3**

- **Dax**
- **Stade Bagnérais**
- **Stadoceste**
- Hagetmau
- Mont-de-Marsan
- Tyrosse
- Oloron
- Bègles-Bordeaux
- Boucau
- Angoulême

**Pool 2**

- **Toulon**
- **Agen**
- **Racing**
- **Lourdes**
- **Valence**
- Biarritz
- Perpignan
- Pau
- Bayonne
- Nîmes

**Pool 4**

- **Bourgoin-Jallieu**
- **Le Creusot-Monchanin**
- **Hyères**
- Tulle
- Castres
- Carcassonne
- Voiron
- Albi
- Saint-Gaudens
- La Voulte

== Knock out stages ==
=== "Last 16" ===
In bold the clubs qualified for the next round . All the qualified, came from pool 1 and 2.

Team 1	Team 2	1st match	2nd match
Hyères	**Toulon**	9-37	12-21
**Béziers**	Lourdes	19-9	9-18
Stadoceste	**Agen**	21-21	6-15
Stade Bagnérais	**Montferrand**	12-16	6-28
Bourgoin-Jallieu	**Racing**	12-9	3-22
Le Creusot-Montchanin	**Brive**	15-15	15-26
Dax	**Toulouse**	18-9	6-29
Valence	**Graulhet**	9-9	9-27

=== Quarter of finals ===
In bold the clubs qualified for the next round

Team 1	Team 2	result
**Toulon**	Béziers	**15-9**
**Agen**	Montferrand	**13-12**
**Racing**	Brive	**22-19**
**Toulouse**	Graulhet	**20-9**

=== Semifinals ===
Team 1	Team 2	result
**Toulon**	Agen	**18-16**
**Racing**	Toulose	**10-9**

== Final ==
Teams	**Toulon** - Racing
Score	**15-12**
Date	2 May 1987
Venue	Parc des Princes, Paris
Referee	Jean-Claude Doulcet
Line-up
Toulon	Manu Diaz, Bernard Herrero, Yann Braendlin, Marc Pujolle, Jean-Charles Orso, Éric Champ, Thierry Louvet, Eric Melville, Jérôme Gallion, Christian Cauvy, Pascal Jehl, Pierre Trémouille, Alain Carbonel, Éric Fourniols, Jérôme Bianchi; Replacements : David Jaubert, Yvan Roux, Henri Chapus, Fabrice Fargues, Hervé Jegou
Racing	Eugenio Stefan, Jean-Pierre Genet, Murray Dawson, Michel Tachdjian, Patrick Serrière, Laurent Cabannes, Xavier Blond, Claude Atcher, Gérald Martinez, Franck Mesnel, Yvon Rousset, Éric Blanc, Renaud Authié, Jean-Baptiste Lafond, Didier Pouyau; Replacements : Philippe Guillard, Franck Hélière, Jean-François Impinna, Vincent Lelano, Laurent Rouyres
Scorers
Toulon	1 try Jaubert, 1 conversion and 2 penalties Bianchi, 1 drop Trémouille
Racing	1 try Genet, 1 conversion and 2 penalties Pouyau

Toulon won his second Bouclier de Brennus, after the first in 1931, and after 4 final lost (1948, 1968, 1971 and 1985).

The team of Racing play the match wearing a pink papillon.
