= Xavier Blond =

Xavier Blond may refer to:

- Xavier Blond (biathlete) (born 1965), French biathlete who competed at two Winter Olympics.
- Xavier Blond (rugby union) (born 1967), French international rugby union player with six caps.
