= Christophe Deslandes =

France international rugby union player

- Born: 2 January 1965 (age 61) Saint-Mandé, France
- Height: 6 ft 7 in (201 cm)
- Weight: 240 lb (109 kg)

Rugby union career
- Position: No. 8 / Lock
International career
Years	Team	Apps	(Points)
1990–92	France	6	(0)

Christophe Deslandes (born 2 January 1965) is a French former international rugby union player.

Born in Saint-Mandé, Deslandes was a forward and won a Brennus Shield with Racing club de France in 1989–90.

Deslandes won six France caps, debuting as a number eight against the Wallabies in Sydney during the 1990 tour of Australia. When France met Wales in the 1991 Five Nations, Deslandes formed a back-row of Racing club de France players, with flankers Laurent Cabannes and Xavier Blond. His appearances in 1992 were as a lock.

== See also ==
- List of France national rugby union players
