= Laurent Vergé =

France international rugby union player

- Born: 21 October 1965 (age 61)
- Height: 5 ft 11 in (180 cm)
- Weight: 228 lb (103 kg)

Rugby union career
- Position: Prop
International career
Years	Team	Apps	(Points)
1993	France	1	(0)

Laurent Vergé (born 21 October 1965) is a French former international rugby union player.

A prop, Vergé was a CA Bègles player and appeared in their 1990–91 Brennus Shield-winning team.

Vergé made his France debut in a 1993 international against Romania in Bucharest. He later joined the French squad on that year's tour of South Africa as an injury replacement for captain Jean-François Tordo, but didn't add another cap.

== See also ==
- List of France national rugby union players
