= 1994 France rugby union tour of Canada and New Zealand =

Summary
P	W	D	L
Total
10	7	0	3
Test match
3	2	0	1
Opponent
P	W	D	L
Canada
1	0	0	1
New Zealand
2	2	0	0

The 1994 France rugby union tour of Canada and New Zealand was a series of matches played in June and July 1994 in Canada and New Zealand by France. After an unexpected loss to Canada, France became the first Northern Hemisphere nation to win a test match series in New Zealand.

France also became the fifth team after the 1937 Springboks, 1949 Wallabies, 1971 British Lions and 1986 Wallabies to win a test series in New Zealand.

== Matches ==
Scores and results list France's points tally first.

Opposing Team	For	Against	Date	Venue	Status
Canada A	34	31	1 June 1994	Toronto	Tour match
Canada	16	18	4 June 1994	Nepean	Test match
North Auckland	28	23	9 June 1994	Whangārei	Tour match
North Harbour	23	27	12 June 1994	Auckland	Tour match
Waiparapa Bush	53	9	15 June 1994	Masterton	Tour match
New Zealand B	33	25	18 June 1994	Wanganui	Tour match
Nelson Bays	48	16	22 June 1994	Nelson	Tour match
New Zealand	22	8	26 June 1994	Lancaster Park, Christchurch	Test match
Hawke's Bay	25	30	29 June 1994	McLean Park, Napier	Tour match
New Zealand	23	20	3 July 1994	Eden Park, Auckland	Test match

== Highlights ==
The 22–8 victory on 26 June was the biggest win by France over New Zealand up to then. In the second test, on 3 July, New Zealand led 20–16 with three minutes of the match remaining. As they tried to run down the clock, Philippe Saint-André started a move in his own 22 which, 65 seconds later, ended with Jean-Luc Sadourny crossing the New Zealand line to score what became known as l'essai du bout du monde (the try from the end of the world), giving them a 23–20 victory. It was the first time a side from a northern hemisphere nation had won a test series against the All Blacks.

== Touring party ==
Backs Sebastien Viars Jean-Luc Sadourny Emile Ntamack Philippe Saint-Andre Laurent Leflamand William Techoueyres Philippe Sella Philippe Carbonneau Yann Delaigue Thierry Lacroix Christophe Deylaud Benoit Bellot Pierre Montlaur Guy Accoceberry Alain Macabiau

Forwards Sylvain Dispagne Leon Loppy Xavier Blond Marc Cecillon Abdelatif Benazzi Jean-Francois Tordo Philippe Benetton Olivier Brouzet Olivier Roumat Olivier Merle Christian Califano Laurent Benezech Laurent Seigne Louis Armary Jean-Michel Gonzalez
