= Hervé Couffignal =

France international rugby union player

- Born: 28 September 1965
- Died: 17 December 2017 (aged 52)
- Height: 5 ft 9 in (175 cm)
- Weight: 154 lb (70 kg)

Rugby union career
- Position: Centre
International career
Years	Team	Apps	(Points)
1993	France	1	(0)

Hervé Couffignal (28 September 1965 – 17 December 2017) was a French rugby union international.

A centre from Carmaux, Couffignal spent most of his career with US Colomiers, which he joined in 1988 after a brief spell at Stade Rochelais. He was capped by France in a win over Romania at Stadionul Dinamo in 1993 and later that year toured South Africa, but didn't play either Test. He finished his career with stints at FC Villefranche and US Verfeil.

Couffignal died in 2017, suffering a heart attacking while jogging.

== See also ==
- List of France national rugby union players
