= Marc Pujolle =

France international rugby union player

- Born: 18 September 1962 (age 64) Nîmes, France
- Height: 6 ft 3 in (191 cm)
- Weight: 237 lb (108 kg)

Rugby union career
- Position: Prop
International career
Years	Team	Apps	(Points)
1989–90	France	8	(0)

Marc Pujolle (born 18 September 1962) is a French former international rugby union player.

Born in Nîmes, Pujolle was a loosehead prop and spent the majority of his career with RC Toulon, winning a French Championship in 1986–87, but won his France caps while playing for Nice.

Pujolle was capped eight times by France, debuting against the British Lions in 1989. He took part in France's 1990 tour of Australia and won his final cap against the All Blacks at the Parc des Princes later that year, having performed well in a Provence/Cote D'Azur side that beat the New Zealanders in Toulon.

== See also ==
- List of France national rugby union players
