= Alain Macabiau =

French rugby union player (born 1966)

- Born: 15 May 1966 (age 60) Perpignan, France
- Height: 5 ft 9 in (175 cm)
- Weight: 160 lb (73 kg)

Rugby union career
- Position: Scrum-half
International career
Years	Team	Apps	(Points)
1994	France	2	(0)

Alain Macabiau (born 15 May 1966) is a French former rugby union international.

Macabiau was born in Perpignan, Pyrénées-Orientales.

A scrum-half, Macabiau was capped twice for France in 1994, while playing with USA Perpignan. His debut came in a Five Nations match against Scotland at Murrayfield, an occasion marred by the death of his mother several days prior. He gained his second cap against Canada in Ottawa and was also on France's 1994 tour of New Zealand.

== See also ==
- List of France national rugby union players
