= Sylvain Dispagne =

France international rugby union player (born 1968)

- Born: 8 February 1968 (age 58) Saint-Girons, Ariège, France
- Height: 6 ft 5 in (196 cm)
- Weight: 229 lb (104 kg)

Rugby union career
- Position: No. 8
International career
Years	Team	Apps	(Points)
1996	France	2	(0)

Sylvain Dispagne (born 8 February 1968) is a French former rugby union international.

Born and raised in Saint-Girons, Ariège, Dispagne played his rugby for the town until starting his career at the top level with USA Perpignan at the age of 20. He then crossed to RC Narbonne and while there earned a place on the France squad for the 1994 tour of New Zealand, but remained uncapped. At his next club, Stade Toulousain, Dispagne played in four national championship-winning teams, also featuring in the 1995–96 Heineken Cup title. He was capped twice as a number eight for France in the 1996 Five Nations Championship, against Ireland and Wales.

Dispagne retired from playing at the age of 34 and began coaching Pechbonnieu-based club EVG, overseeing their promotion to the Fédérale 1 in 2009. He has since left coaching and works in the electricity industry.

== See also ==
- List of France national rugby union players
