= 2000 New Zealand rugby union tour of France and Italy =

Summary
P	W	D	L
Total
4	3	0	1
Test match
3	2	0	1
Opponent
P	W	D	L
France
2	1	0	1
Italy
1	1	0	0

The 2000 New Zealand rugby union tour of Japan and Europe was a series of matches played in November 2000 in Japan and Europe by New Zealand national rugby union team.

It was a double tour because, while the All Blacks, the "New Zealand A" (at those time not called as "Junior All Blacks", name used for Under 23 side) toured also.

== All Blacks Tour ==
Scores and results list New Zealand's points tally first.

Opposing Team	For	Against	Date	Venue	Status
Pacific Rim Barbarians	50	10	3 November 2000	Chichibu, Tokyo	Tour match
France	39	26	11 November 2000	Stade de France, Paris	Test match
France	33	42	18 November 2000	Marseille	Test match
Italy	56	19	25 November 2000	Genoa	Test match

== "A" team tour ==
Scores and results list New Zealand's points tally first.

Opposing Team	For	Against	Date	Venue	Status
French Barbarians	21	23	8 November 2000	Félix-Bollaert, Lens	Tour match
Wales A	30	9	11 November 2000	Millennium, Cardiff	Tour match
France Universities	33	21	16 November 2000	Stade J. Dauger, Bayonne	Tour match
Romania	82	9	26 November 2000	Arcul de Triumf, Bucharest	Tour match
