= Michel Tachdjian =

France international rugby union player (born 1962)

- Born: 6 June 1962 (age 64) Asnières-sur-Seine, France
- Height: 6 ft 5 in (196 cm)
- Weight: 221 lb (100 kg)

Rugby union career
- Position: Lock
International career
Years	Team	Apps	(Points)
1991	France	3	(0)

Michel Tachdjian (born 6 June 1962) is a French former rugby union international.

Tachdjian was a Asnières-sur-Seine-born lock of Armenian descent, nicknamed "the anaesthetist of Yerevan”. He was a CSM Clamart youth product and played in the Racing Club de France team that won the 1989–90 French Championship.

In the 1991 Five Nations, Tachdjian was capped three times by France. He played in the first two matches, wins over Scotland and Ireland, lost his place for the Wales match, before returning for the championship decider against England.

== See also ==
- List of France national rugby union players
