= History of the France national rugby union team =

The French national rugby union team first competed at the 1900 Summer Olympics.

== Early years ==
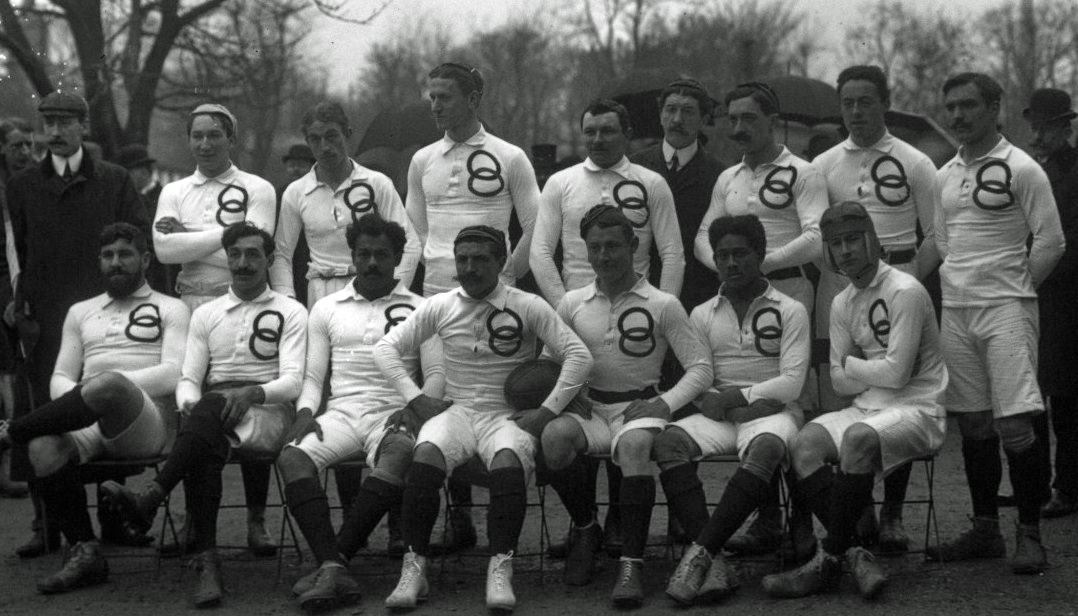
The original France XV v New Zealand, 1 January 1906, Paris

Rugby was introduced to the Le Havre region of France by British merchants and students in the 1870s and was subsequently spread throughout the schools and colleges. The first clubs were established in the late 1870s and early 1880s, with a club championship soon formed, and games against English clubs organised. The first involvement a national rugby union side had was at the 1900 Paris Olympics, where a French team took part in the tournament and defeated Britain (represented by Mosley Wanderers RFC) 27 – 8 and Germany 27–17 to win the gold medal. However the team represent France at the 1900 games are not considered to be a Test XV.

On January 1, 1906 France played its first ever Test match – a 38–8 loss to Dave Gallaher's All Blacks in Paris. In The Complete Rugby Footballer, Gallaher and Billy Stead wrote of French rugby; "We are strongly of the opinion that the game will spread in their country and that in the course of time they will put a team in the field which will command the utmost respect of any other." France first played England in March of that year, again in France, this time losing 35–8.

France played their first Test outside their nation on the January 1, 1907, losing to England 31–13 at the Athletic Ground in Richmond. Two days later they played a game against the Springboks in Parc des Princes, Paris with a side made up from the two Parisian clubs: Stade Français and Racing Club de France. Only two of the side that had faced the All Blacks played against the Springboks – three-quarter Paul Sagot and forward Georges Jérôme – and none was in the team that had played England. The Springboks scored 13 tries in winning 55–6.

== The Five Nations and the Olympics ==
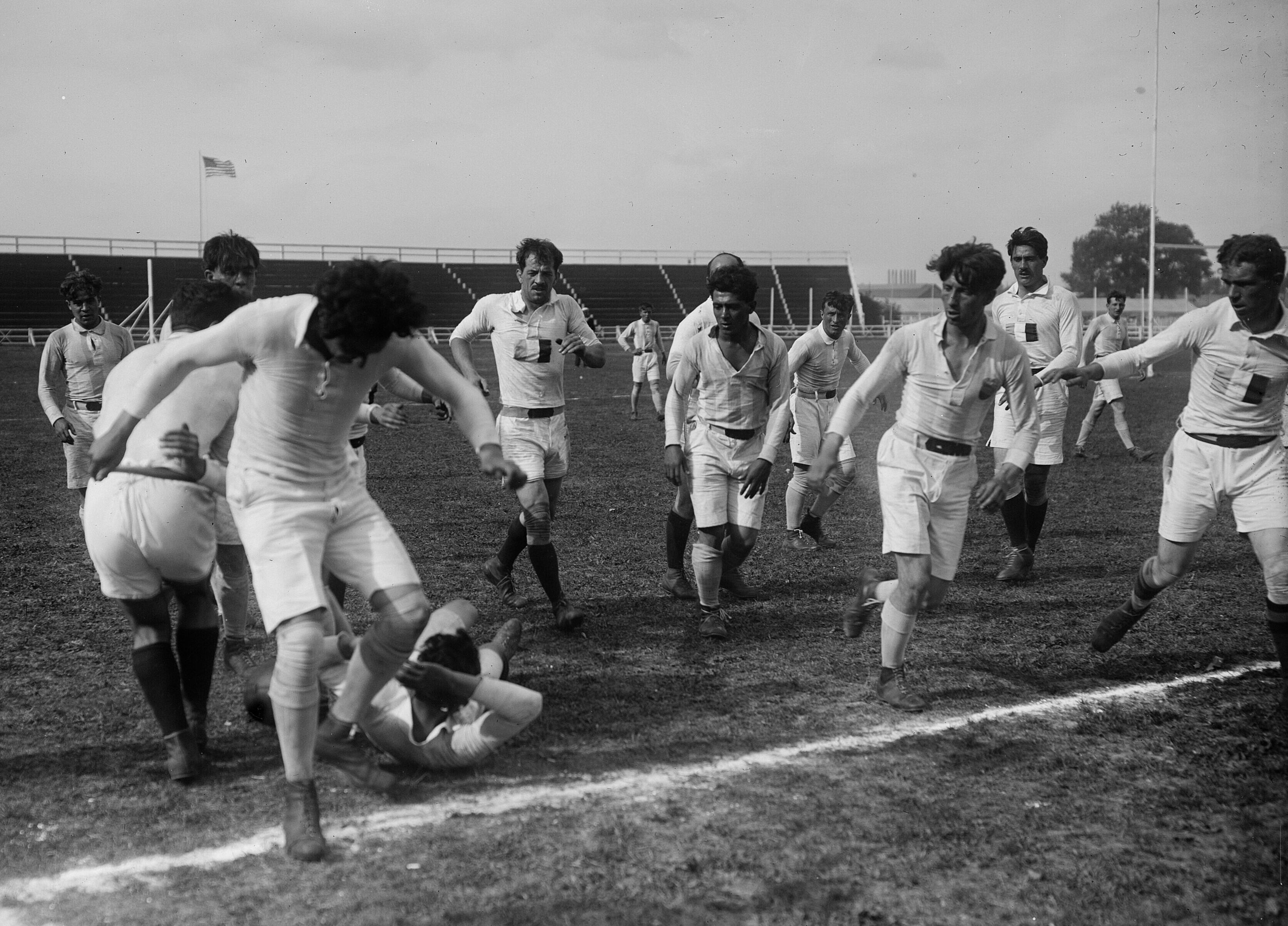
Romania versus France at the Inter-Allied Games of 1919

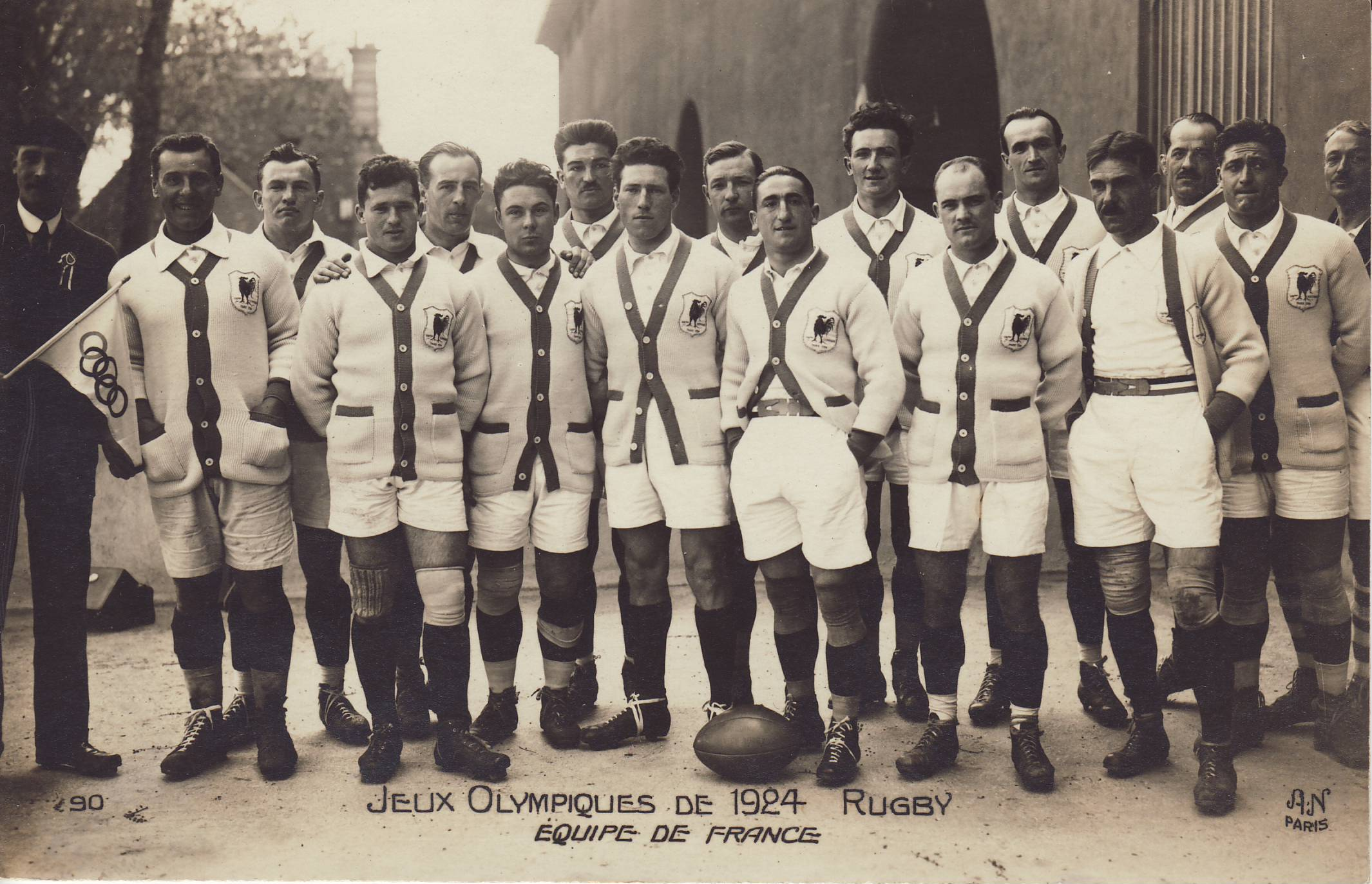
The team that played at the 1924 Summer Olympics.

France played Wales for the first time on 2 March 1908, losing 36 – 14 away from home. On March 20, 1909, France played Ireland for the first time, falling 19–8.

When Scotland played France in the first official international match between the two countries in 1910, the foundation was laid for a Five Nations competition. Their first win in the competition came against Scotland 16–15 in Paris in 1911. In early 1913, France was host to a touring Springboks party, France lost 5 points to 35, the match was part of an era that last from 1911 until 1920 which saw France lose 18 games in a row.

In 1919, the Fédération Française de Rugby was formed, 13 years after France's Test debut. At the 1920 Antwerp Olympics there was another rugby event and France was one of only two teams to enter. A straight final took place between the US and France but the US caused a shock by winning 8–0 to take the gold medal. Their first win in the five nations against Ireland was attained in 1920 in Dublin – 15–7. During their last match of the 1921 Five Nations, France showed signs of new strength beating Ireland 20 to 10. Though France did not win a game the following year, the side did draw with Scotland and England.

For the 1924 Olympics held in Paris rugby union was again included. France scored 13 tries to comfortably defeated Romania 59–3, with winger Adolphe Jaureguy scoring four. The final took place at Colombes Stadium in Paris on May 18, 1924 and the US took the gold with a 17–3 victory in front of 30,000 spectators. The All Blacks returned to France in 1925, the first time since their inaugural Test against them in 1906, France lost 6 to 30.

== Expelled from Five Nations ==
The mid to late 1920s was a period of disappointment for the French, that is until they won their first games over England and Wales, in 1927 and 1928 respectively. France had mediocre results on field during the latter end of the decade and the start of the 1930s, but showed definite signs of improvements in the Five Nations. However, they were expelled from the Five Nations in 1932 following accusations of professionalism in the French league as well as on-field violence and poor organisation and were not allowed to rejoin until 1939. During this time many French players turned to rugby league, which began to build in popularity, as the latter code was excluded from the Five Nations. Despite this there were some internationals played; Germany between 1932 and 1936, Italy (1937) and Romania (1938). On 2 January 1934 FIRA was formed, an organisation to rival the International Rugby Board (IRB). Having been expelled from the Five Nations and forced to play against weaker opposition, France went on a winning spree which still stands today, winning ten games in a row during the years from 1931 to 1936. In 1939, the FFR was invited to send a team to the Five Nations Championship for the following season, but when war was declared, international rugby was suspended. While occupied by Germany during the Second World War, Vichy France banned rugby league and forced its integration into French rugby union.

== Post war ==
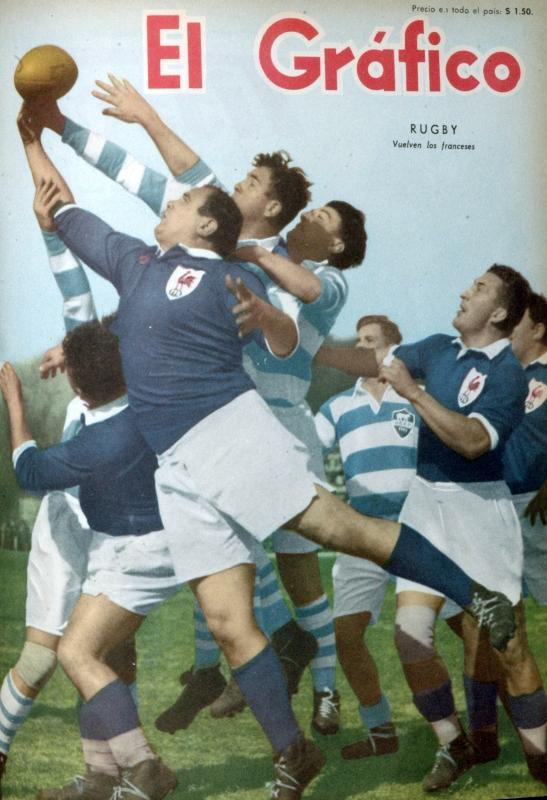
France playing Argentina at Buenos Aires, in 1954.

The Five nations resumed after the second World War in 1947 and French rugby came of age. Lucien Mias was the innovative captain whose line-out ploys brought a new attacking dimension to forward play. France beat Wales in 1948 and England in 1951. In 1952, France played their second match against the Springboks and again lost 25–3. France claimed a share of the Five Nations title for the first time in 1954 alongside England and Wales. France also recorded their first win over New Zealand 3–0 at Stade Colombes in 1954. In 1955, France had defeated England, Ireland and Scotland, a win against Wales would give France its first ever Grand Slam. However France lost to Wales 11–16 at Stade Colombes in Paris.

The French became the first northern hemisphere country to tour South Africa in 1958. They upset the Springboks by winning the two-Test series. Led by Lucien Mias, in the absence of tour skipper Michel Celaya who had been injured, the underestimated French drew the first Test 3–3 at Newlands and then produced an even bigger shock by beating the Springboks 9–5 at altitude at Ellis Park. That series victory signalled that France were now a top rugby nation. Victories over Scotland and Wales at the Stade Colombes, together with a 3–3 draw with England at Twickenham earned France their first outright Five Nations title in 1959. They arrived in Dublin as champions, only to be denied a Grand Slam by a 9–5 defeat.

== The sixties ==
Les Bleus scored four tries to one at Cardiff Arms Park and beating Ireland with a record score, 23–6. France's match against England ended in a stalemate and the two sides had to share the 1960 Five Nations trophy. Pierre Albaladejo set a record for the most drop goals, three, in the 23–6 victory over Ireland. France then embarked on a tour of Argentina. In three Tests, France scored 78 points in three victories while the Pumas scored only 12 points. In 1961, the French won the five nations championship outright. The Springboks formidable 1960/61 touring side defeated Scotland, Ireland, England and Wales but were held to a 0–0 draw at Stade Colombes. The game was almost abandoned after fighting broke out. The Tricolours became the first European national team to tour New Zealand in 1961. Les Bleus went on to lose half of the provincial games and both Tests to New Zealand 5–3 and 32–3. The French played a single Test on Australian soil and went home with a 15–8 win over the Wallabies.

France won the 1962 Five Nations, but missed out on the Grand Slam again after losing to Wales for the fourth consecutive year. France lost a Test to Romania at the end of the year and in 1964 again toured South Africa. They lost only one of their six games and defeated South Africa 8–6. According to Danie Craven the Test was the worst seen in South Africa up until that time.

France set a then record win over England in 1966. After back-to-back Welsh wins, the French won the 1967 Five nations title. The title came down to the last match of the championship against Ireland at Lansdowne Road which France won 11–6, only a 9–8 defeat by Scotland preventing them from winning a Grand Slam. France embarked on their first full-scale tour of South Africa. They were beaten 26–3 in Durban and 16–3 in the "Battle of Bloemfontein" but were able to come back and win the third 19–14 in Johannesburg and draw the last 6–6 in Cape Town.

In 1967, they again won the five nations championship. They returned to South Africa, but lost the Test series 2–1 with one match draw. Fifty-eight years after contesting their first Five Nations tournament, France won their first 'Grand Chelem' with a 14–9 win over Wales at the Arms Park in 1968. However, it was overshadowed by the deaths of Guy Boniface and Jean-Michael Capendeguy in road accidents. They toured New Zealand but once again failed to make an impact, losing the series 3–0. France imploded the following year, losing their first three matches to Scotland, Ireland and England but draw with Wales to deny them a Grand Slam.

== The seventies ==
Les Bleus continued to feature as a major player in the five nations, finishing first equal in 1970, second in 1971. In 1972, in the final international played at the Yves du Manoir Stadium at Colombes, France marked the occasion by scoring six tries to one and racking up their biggest ever win against England 37–12. Jean Desclaux coached France between 1973 and 1980. The 1976 Championship went well for France, their only loss came against Wales and they beat England 30–9. 1977 saw France win their second Grand Slam with Jacques Fouroux as captain. No tries were scored against them and they fielded an unchanged team throughout the championship. In November, France beat New Zealand 18–10 in Toulouse but the All Blacks squared the series in Paris by winning 15–3. In the 1978 five nations championship, France met Wales in a Grand Slam decider at the Cardiff Arms Park, the Welsh ran out 16–9 victors. In March 1978, France finally became a full member of the International Rugby Board. France overcame a first Test defeat to beat the All Blacks in New Zealand for the first time 24–19 on Bastille day 14 July 1979 at Eden Park.

== The eighties and early nineties ==
On the 8th of November 1980, France play their last international against South Africa in the apartheid era. They were led by Jean-Pierre Rives and lost 15–37 to the Springboks at Newlands in what was termed the "Summer Test". Jacques Fouroux became the coach of France shortly before the 1981 Five Nations tournament. In the ten years that he managed the side, France won the Five Nations on six occasions and two Grand Slams (1981 and 1987). France's successes were based around their massive pack, a fact which upset a number of commentators in France who preferred a more technical approach. Famous names from this time included Philippe Sella, Daniel Dubroca and Serge Blanco.

In 1981 France clinched the Grand Slam at Twickenham. The 1983 championship came down to the last game played against holders Ireland at Lansdowne Road, Ireland triumphed 22–16. Scotland and France meet in a Grand Slam decider at Murrayfield, the Scots secure the Grand Slam. The 1986 Five Nations title is shared by Scotland and France after both won three games and lost one. An inexperienced team New Zealand team arrived in France in the autumn. The vast majority of New Zealand's top players had taken part in a rebel tour of South Africa in 1986 and had been banned. Despite this the 'Baby Blacks' won 19–7 in Toulouse. France won 16–3 over the All Blacks in the 'Battle of Nantes' in 1986.

France entered the inaugural World Cup as one of the favourites. France beat Australia 30–24 in the semi-final, coming from behind three times to triumph. France were unable to repeat the feat in the final against favourites New Zealand losing 29–9. After an embarrassing 12–6 defeat to Romania on French soil, Fouroux was given the sack. The 1988 Five Nations is shared between France and Wales. France again win the Five Nations in 1989, but are denied the Grand Slam by England, who triumph 11–0.

With the ban on playing South Africa lifted, France toured South Africa. Tour captain Jean-Francois Tordo was injured playing against Western Province, and was replaced as captain by Olivier Roumat. France won the Test series following a draw and win over their hosts – the win an 18–17 victory at Ellis Park. The series win was unexpected: they had previously lost to a South Africa B side, lost to provincial side Northern Transvaal, and drawn with Free State province. France were knocked out by England in the quarter-finals in the 1991 Rugby World Cup.

The early 1990s had seen France in the shadow of England. Eight consecutive defeats to Will Carling's teams, starting in 1989, underlined the indiscipline of French rugby. An isolated Five Nations title came in 1993, as England slipped to defeats in Cardiff and Dublin. In 1992, Argentina stunned France 24–20 in Nantes, the Pumas' first ever win on French soil. On their 1994 tour of New Zealand, the French, under captain Philippe Saint-André, recorded a 2–0 series win over the All Blacks. The series win was sealed by the famous "try from the end of the world", which saw Saint-André begin a counterattack from deep in France's end in the final minutes that ended with Jean-Luc Sadourny scoring the winning try. France were desperately unlucky to lose in the semi-finals to the hosts and eventual champions South Africa in 1995. The miserable run against the English finally came to an end in the third place play-off at the 1995 World Cup.

== Professional era ==
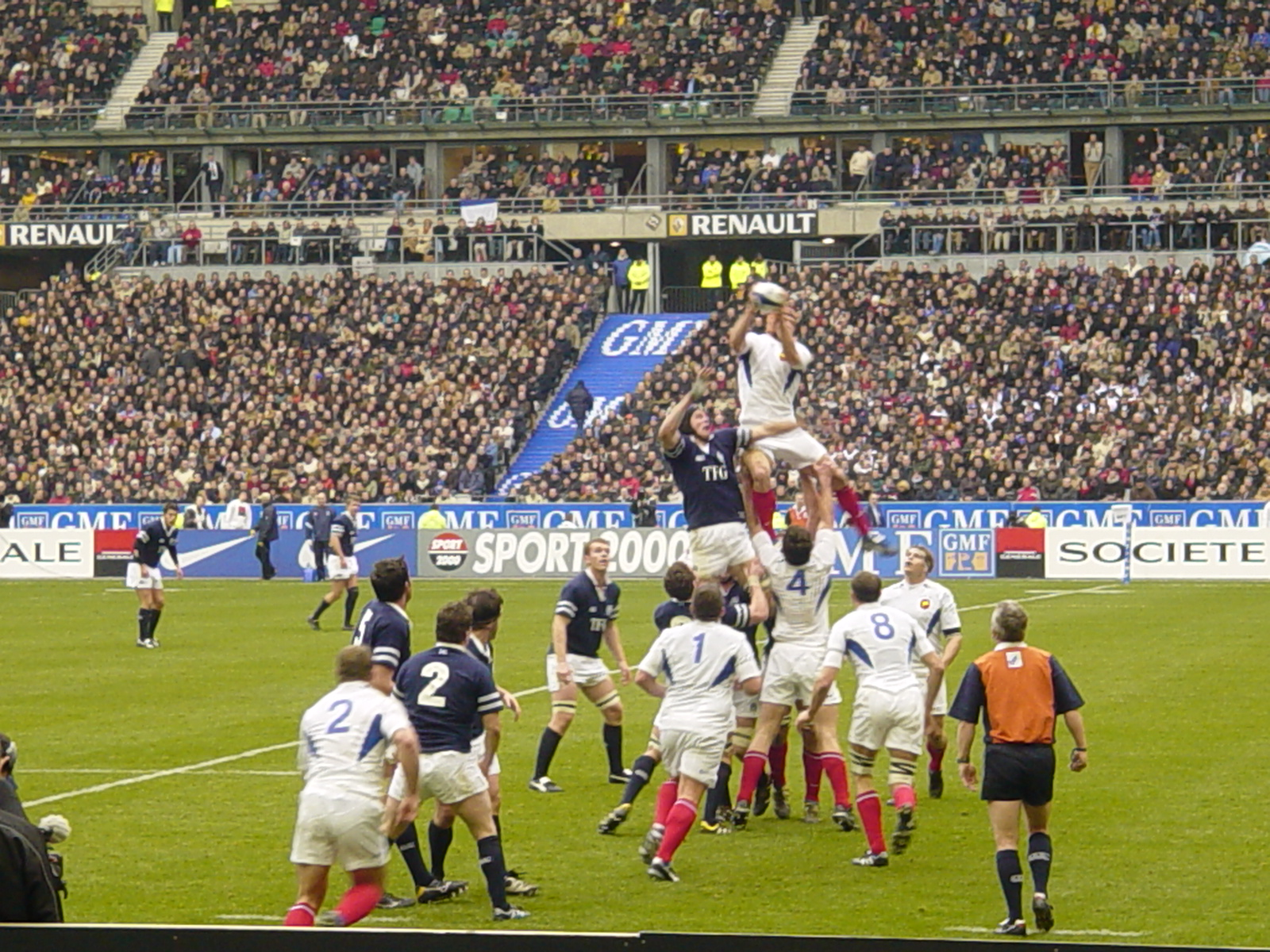
France (white) playing Scotland in 2004.

As the game adjusted to the new professional era, the Championship was very much dominated by England, who coming off the 1995 win, backed up with a tournament win in 1996. During the tournament, France actually defeated England, but it was their one-point loss to Wales that prevented them from taking the title. After the Five Nations France hosted Romania, and later travelled to Argentina for a two match series; winning all fixtures. At the end of the year, they met Wales, who had beaten them in their last game of the Five Nations, though this time France won, 40 to 33, though this was followed by two losses to the Springboks at home.

After narrowly missing out on the 1996 Five Nations championship, France entered the tournament with confidence, and went through the competition undefeated. After the win, France played aspiring Five Nations entrants Italy, who defeated France 40 points to 32. After defeating Romania, France continued on to Australia for a two Test series, which they lost. At the end of the year, France defeated Italy, Romania and Argentina at home, and against host South Africa for a two Test series, losing both, the second by 40 points.

Despite performing poorly against the southern hemisphere teams of Australia and South Africa in 1997, France successfully defended their Five Nations title, and again completed a grand slam of the tournament, even defeating Wales 51 to nil. France also hosted Australia at the end of the year, though the Wallabies won, 32 to 21. Their Five Nations title defense was off to a weak start, after defeating Ireland by just one point. France went on to lose every other match and finished wooden-spoonists in the last ever Five Nations. Bernard Laporte became the first fully professional head coach at the end of 1999.

After mixed results during the mid-year, France stormed through the group stages at the 1999 World Cup to finish atop of their pool. After defeating Argentina 47 to 26 in the quarter-finals, France proceeded to the semi-finals, where they met red hot favourites, the All Blacks. Trailing by 14 point at the beginning of the second half, Fabien Pelous' troops mounted an outstanding display of attacking rugby, scoring 30 consecutive points to triumph 43–31. In the final, they met Australia; fatigue took hold as they were beaten convincingly 35 to 12 at Cardiff's new Millennium Stadium.

== 21st century ==
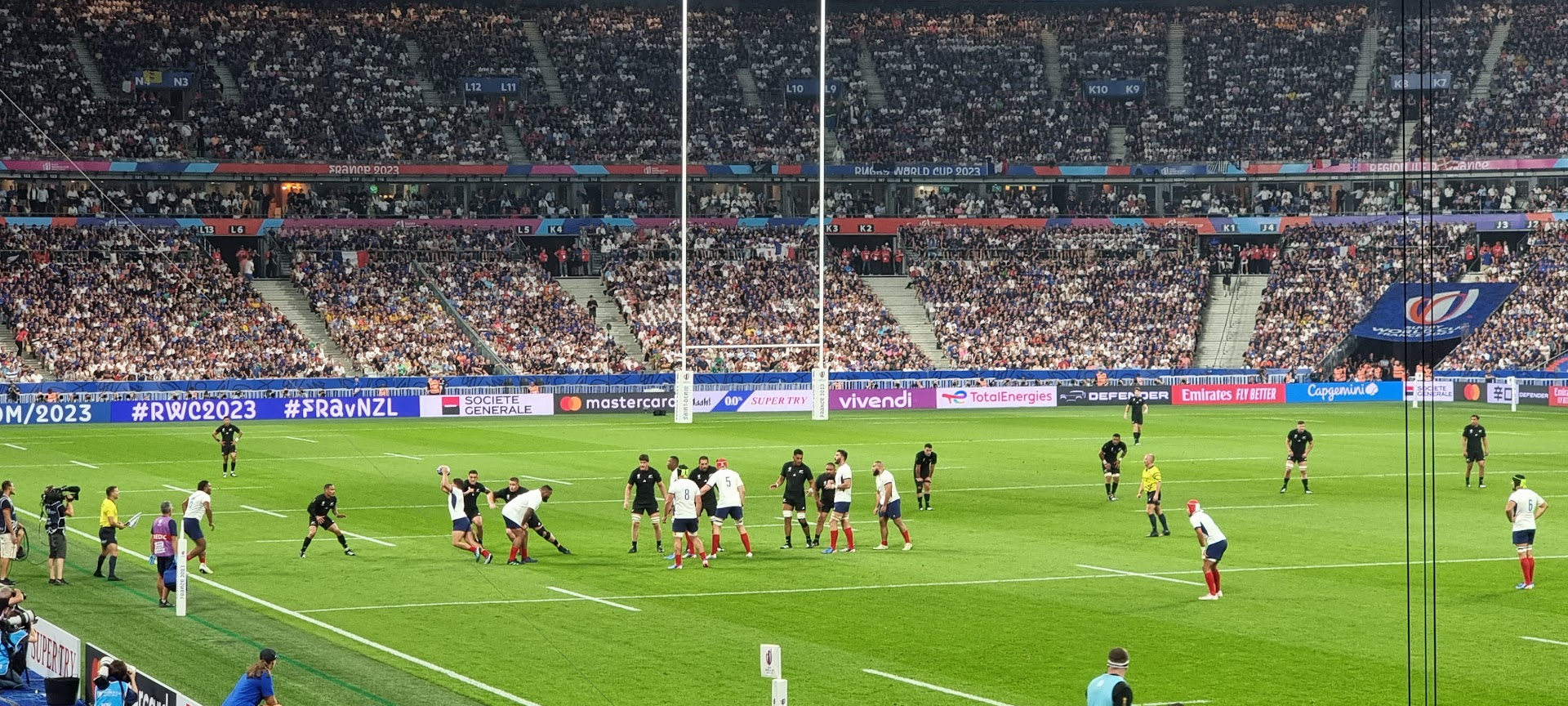
2023 Rugby World Cup match between France and New Zealand (All Blacks).

In 2000, Italy joined the Five Nations, making the tournament the Six Nations. France did not perform to expectations in the revamped tournament, losing to both England and Ireland and finishing second behind England. After defeating Romania 67 to 20, France hosted Australia in Paris, who beat them 18 to 13 in a 1999 World Cup final re-match. This was followed by a two Test series against the All Blacks, which France lost one and won one.

France again did not perform that well in the 2001 Six Nations, losing to Ireland, Wales and England; and only finishing fifth. They did however manage victories over South Africa and Australia at the end of the year, as well as an impressive 77 to 10 win over Fiji. France went undefeated in the 2002 Six Nations Championship to claim the first Six Nations grand slam. Though they later lost two games to Australia, France defeated South Africa, and drew with the All Blacks that year. France is No. 1 International ranking in 2002.

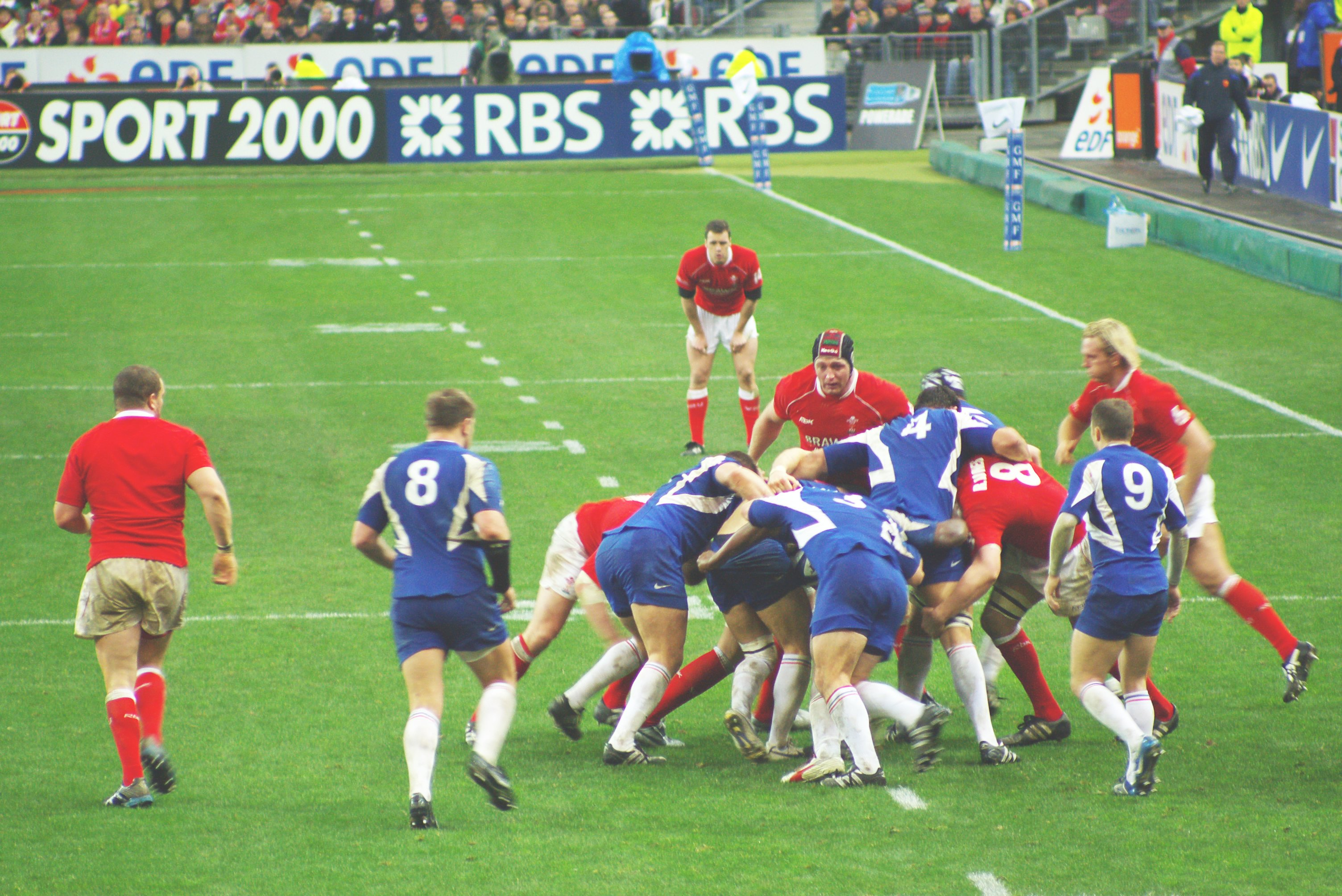
France playing Wales during the 2007 Six Nations Championship.

France lost two matches at the 2003 Six Nations, including their opening game with England, who would go on to win a grand slam. France finished only third. After the strong showing at the World Cup, France reproduced their Six Nations success of 2002 at the 2004 Six Nations Championship. France won all five of their matches to win the tournament and complete a grandslam. France finished second, behind Wales in the 2005 Six Nations Championship, and the following year at the 2006 tournament, France won again, getting their third Six Nations trophy under Laporte.

In preparation for the 2003 World Cup, France played Argentina, the All Blacks and England, with mixed results. France won their opening match against Fiji at Brisbane's Suncorp Stadium, which saw them continue undefeated through the rest of the pool stages. They met Ireland at Telstra Dome in Melbourne in the quarter-finals, which they won 43 points to 21. France then met England at Telstra Stadium in Sydney, and went down seven to 24. At the same venue, France contested for third place with the All Blacks, and lost, finishing fourth overall in the tournament.

The following year France completed a tournament grand slam of the 2004 Six Nations, including a win over World Champions England. After a short successful tour of North America, France played southern hemisphere teams, Australia, Argentina and the All Blacks; losing all three. In 2005 France completed another strong Six Nations, losing only to eventual grand slam winners Wales. France lost a two Test series to South Africa, and lost to Australia during the mid-year. At the end of the year, France continued Australia's run of losses, and completed heavy wins over Canada and Tonga, and a close victory over South Africa. France lost their opening game of the 2006 Six Nations, 16 to 20 to Scotland, but went on to defeat the other four nations to win the Six Nations.

In their final tournament before the 2007 World Cup, France's defence of their title proved again successful, although it came down to the final minutes of their last 6 Nations game to regain the crown. France needed to beat Scotland by more than the Irish beat Italy to ensure that they would be champions again. They were successful, winning the Championship by 4 points.

France failed to retain their crown in 2008, finishing third overall. Despite beating Scotland, Italy and Ireland, France's Grand Slam dreams went up in smoke after a poor, aimless performance against England. France also failed to deny Wales the Grand Slam in the final game losing 29–12.

France won the Grand Slam again in 2010 by beating England 12–10 in Paris in their final match.

France's 2011 Rugby World Cup campaign was marked by turmoil within the camp. Reports before the tournament indicated as many as 25 of the 30-member squad had turned against head coach Marc Lièvremont. In pool play, France had unimpressive wins over Japan and Canada, an expected loss to New Zealand, and a shock loss to Tonga. During this stage, Lièvremont heavily criticized the team in the media, further angering many of his players. Veteran number 8 Imanol Harinordoquy responded publicly, attacking Lièvremont for taking his criticism public instead of keeping it within the team. Despite the losses, they qualified for the knockout stage. At this time, the players rebelled against Lièvremont, with Harinordoquy telling the French rugby publication Midi Olympique after the tournament, "We had to free ourselves from his supervision." The team responded by defeating England 19–12 in the quarter-final and controversially beating Wales 9–8 in the semi-final after Welsh captain Sam Warburton was sent off. The French proved admirable opponents in the final, losing out to New Zealand 8–7 to finish second for the third time in a Rugby World Cup.

== Sources ==
- 100 years of SA rugby contact with France (from Planet Rugby)
- HISTORY OF RUGBY IN OTHER COUNTRIES
