= 1995 New Zealand rugby union tour of Italy and France =

Summary
P	W	D	L
Total
8	7	0	1
Test match
3	2	0	1
Opponent
P	W	D	L
Italy
1	1	0	0
France
2	1	0	1

The 1995 New Zealand rugby union tour of Italy and France was a series of matches played in October and November 1995 in Italy and France by New Zealand national rugby union team.

== Results ==
Scores and results list New Zealand's points tally first.

Opposing Team	For	Against	Date	Venue	Status
Italy A	51	21	25 October 1995	St. Maria Goretti, Catania	Tour match
Italy	70	6	28 October 1995	Dall'Ara Stadium, Bologna	Test match
French Barbarians	34	19	1 November 1995	Stade Mayol, Toulon	Tour match
Languedoc-Roussillon	30	9	4 November 1995	Stade de la Mediterranee, Béziers	Tour match
Cote Basque-Landes	47	20	7 November 1995	Stade J. Dauger, Bayonne	Tour match
France	15	22	11 November 1995	Stadium Municipal, Toulouse	Test match
France XV	55	17	14 November 1995	St. M. Picot, Nancy	Tour match
France	37	12	18 November 1995	Parc des Princes, Paris	Test match
