= Jean-François Tordo =

French rugby union player (born 1964)

- Born: 1 August 1964 (age 62) Nice, France
- Height: 6 ft 1 in (1.85 m)
- Weight: 212 lb (96 kg)

Rugby union career
- Position(s): Flanker, Hooker
Senior career
Years	Team	Apps	(Points)
- Nice
–	RC Toulonnais		
–	Bourgoin		
International career
Years	Team	Apps	(Points)
1991-1993	France	15	(0)

Jean-François Tordo (born 1 August 1964) is a French former rugby union player. He played for Nice, RC Toulonnais, Bourgoin, and for the France national team.

Tordo made his international début for France on 13 July 1991, against the United States at Denver. He won 15 caps from 1991 to 1993, without scoring. Unusually, he played as a flanker (nine caps), number eight (once), and hooker (five caps). He captained France six times, including leading them to win the Five Nations Championship in 1993.

== Honours ==
- Five Nations Championship: 1993
- French championship: 1987
- French championship finalist: 1983 and 1989
