= Pierre Montlaur =

France international rugby union player

- Born: 7 February 1963 Castelsarrasin, France
- Died: 27 January 2024 (aged 60) Bordeaux, France
- Height: 5 ft 8 in (173 cm)
- Weight: 166 lb (75 kg)

Rugby union career
- Position: Fullback / Fly-half
International career
Years	Team	Apps	(Points)
1992–94	France	2	(2)

Pierre Montlaur (7 February 1963 — 27 January 2024) was a French rugby union international player.

A CA Castelsarrasin product, Montlaur played his rugby mostly as a fly-half and fullback.

Montlaur amassed 1,504 points for SU Agen and played in three championship finals with the club. He lost his first final in 1984 when he had the misfortune of being one of the players that missed a shot in a penalty shootout, before winning his only Brennus Shield in 1988, kicking a drop-goal in SU Agen's 9–3 triumph over Stadoceste Tarbais.

In 1992, Montlaur gained two France caps, coming on off the bench in matches against England and Scotland.

Montlaur was a coach on the CA Brive team which won the 1996–97 Heineken Cup, taking charge of the backs.

Montlaur died from motor neurone disease in Bordeaux, on 27 January 2024, at the age of 60.

== See also ==
- List of France national rugby union players
