= Laurent Cabannes =

France international rugby union player

Laurent Jean-Marie Cabannes (raised in Béarn, born in Reims 6 February 1964) is a former French rugby union footballer. He played as a flanker.

Cabannes is usually considered one of the best French flankers of his generation. He played at Section Paloise, Racing Club de France, Western Province, in South Africa, and Harlequin F.C., in England. He won the title of French Champion with Racing Club de France, in 1990, and was runners-up, in 1987.

Though a victim of an auto accident in 1990, and missing many months of rugby as consequence, Cabannes ultimately won 49 caps for France, with 2 tries scored, 8 points in aggregate, from 1987 to 1997. He played six times at the Five Nations, in 1991, 1992, 1993, 1994, 1995 and 1996, being a member of the winning team in 1993. Cabannes played four matches at the 1991 Rugby World Cup, and five matches at the 1995 Rugby World Cup, where France finished in 3rd place.
