= Xavier Blond (rugby union) =

France international rugby union player

- Born: 28 August 1967 (age 59) Lagny-sur-Marne, France
- Height: 6 ft 3 in (191 cm)
- Weight: 211 lb (96 kg)

Rugby union career
- Position: Flanker
International career
Years	Team	Apps	(Points)
1990–94	France	6	(0)

Xavier Blond (born 28 August 1967) is a French former rugby union international.

Blond, born in the eastern suburbs of Paris, was a product of the AS Lagny club. He spent his career with two Paris-based teams, Racing Club de France and Stade Français, winning a Brennus Shield with both.

A strong and fast flanker, Blond gained six France caps during the early 1990s, debuting in the 3rd and final Test of the 1990 tour of Australia at the Sydney Football Stadium.

Blond featured in all four matches of the 1991 Five Nations Championship, that came down to the final round Test between France and England at Twickenham to decide which of the two would win the grand slam. The French were beaten 19–21, with Blond giving away a costly nine-points through penalties. He was considered fortunate not to have been sent off in the second half for a shove on referee Les Peard.

In 1994, Blond played in the series-securing 2nd Test win over the All Blacks at Eden Park on the tour of New Zealand. He served as acting captain for the tour match against Nelson Bays, an occasion marred by his sending off for stamping.

== See also ==
- List of France national rugby union players
