= Barbarians vs New Zealand, 1973 =

Rugby union match

Barbarians v New Zealand
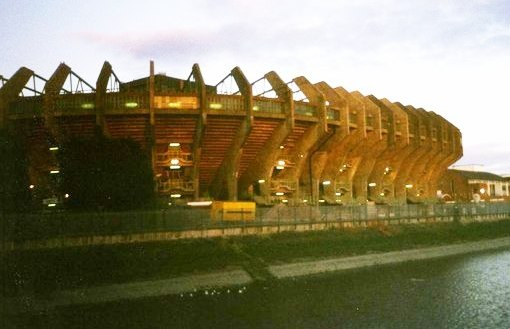
- Cardiff Arms Park
- Event: 1972–73 New Zealand rugby union tour
Barbarians	New Zealand
	(New Zealand)
23	11
- Date: 27 January 1973
- Venue: Cardiff Arms Park, Cardiff
- Referee: Georges Domercq (France)

As part of their tour to North America and Europe in 1972–73, the New Zealand national rugby union team played the Barbarians at Cardiff Arms Park in Cardiff in their last match in Great Britain. It was the fourth meeting between the two sides, the first time the Barbarians had beaten New Zealand and is considered to be one of the best rugby union matches ever played.

The game is also notable for the try scored by Gareth Edwards in the opening minutes of the match. The score, often simply referred to as "that try", is considered by many pundits to be the greatest try ever scored in rugby union. The Barbarians won the game 23–11.

== Team selection ==
The Barbarians selected a strong team for the match; 12 of the starting line-up had been part of the British Lions' touring party to New Zealand in 1971. In keeping with Barbarians tradition, English lock Bob Wilkinson and Welsh flanker Tommy David were uncapped for their countries, while Llanelli RFC's Phil Bennett was the heir apparent to the now-retired Barry John at fly-half. David and wing John Bevan were late additions to the side; David was promoted from the replacements' bench after Swansea RFC's Mervyn Davies came down with the flu, resulting in Derek Quinnell being moved to number 8 to accommodate David at blindside flanker, while Bevan had been called up from a scheduled game for Cardiff RFC that day to replace the injured Gerald Davies, another 1971 British Lion. The strength of the Barbarians' side led to the media billing the match as the fifth test of the 1971 Lions tour.

== Match ==
=== First half ===
The Barbarians kicked off towards the River Taff end of the stadium, and the opening exchanges were dominated by back-and-forth kicks, with J. P. R. Williams and Mike Gibson giving the Barbarians good field position inside the New Zealand half.

==== That try ====
The game is one I will never forget and those of us who played in it will never be allowed to forget. It is a match that will live with me forever. People tend only to remember the first four minutes of the game because of "the try", but what they forgot is the great deal of good rugby played afterwards, much of which came from the All Blacks. After the success of the 1971 Lions tour, which captured the imagination of the whole country, it was an opportunity to bring a lot of that side together again.

— Gareth Edwards on the quality and legacy of the match.

After the Barbarians failed to recover possession at their own ensuing lineout, New Zealand winger Bryan Williams kicked deep into Barbarian territory; Phil Bennett recovered possession near his own goal line, and with nearly the entire length of the field between him and the New Zealand goal line, he started upfield as encouraged by coach Carwyn James immediately before the game, "Phil you have a great sidestep, but I don't suppose you will use it. Yet these All Blacks are made to be sidestepped, you could sidestep them off the park". Bennett sidestepped three times and evaded three tackles before passing the ball on to J. P. R. Williams, who managed to offload the ball despite the on-rushing Bryan Williams tackling him around the neck. Still deep inside their own half, the Barbarians moved the ball through four pairs of hands (John Pullin, John Dawes, Tommy David and Derek Quinnell) before Gareth Edwards, sprinted between two team-mates and seemingly intercepting the last pass, finished the try with a dive into the left-hand corner, 22 seconds after Bennett picked up the ball.

The BBC coverage of the match featured live commentary from former Wales fly-half, Cliff Morgan whose commentary of "that try" is also considered to be among the best ever:

"Kirkpatrick to Williams. This is great stuff. Phil Bennett covering. Chased by Alistair Scown. Brilliant! Oh, that's brilliant! John Williams, Bryan Williams. Pullin. John Dawes, great dummy. To David, Tom David, the half-way line! Brilliant by Quinnell! This is Gareth Edwards! A dramatic start! What a score!

Bennett's conversion attempt fell short, but nonetheless the Barbarians had a 4–0 lead inside four minutes.

==== All Blacks pressure and Slattery and Bevan tries ====
However, after such a promising start, the Barbarians then spent much of the ensuing 20 minutes defending. The All Blacks came storming back into the game and created several scoring chances over the next 10 minutes. After winning a turnover inside the Barbarians 22 following an errant pass from Barbarian prop Ray McLoughlin, fly-half Bob Burgess narrowly missed a drop-goal attempt. A few minutes later, only great covering defence from J. P. R. Williams stopped an almost certain try after Bruce Robertson had put a grubber kick through for his winger Grant Batty to chase. New Zealand scrum-half Sid Going was then penalised for not putting the ball into a scrum straight 5 yards out from the Barbarians' line, killing the good momentum their forwards had built up in the preceding passages of play.

The Barbarians then enjoyed their own stretch of attacking chances, with Gibson pouncing on a New Zealand knock-on in midfield to set up a counter-attack that was only thwarted by a timely interception by Robertson. A few minutes later, Edwards scythed through the All Black line after a tap-penalty, giving the Barbarians an excellent attacking platform a few yards from the New Zealand line, only for hooker Pullin to be penalised for having his foot up early in the scrum. David Duckham then almost got around New Zealand's defence on the right wing with his first touch of the ball all match, but Burgess produced an excellent covering tackle to cut out the danger. Cliff Morgan commented here that the action was "unceasing" – barely 15 minutes had been played.

Momentum then swung back New Zealand's way and they pinned the Barbarians deep inside their half. Barbarian debutant Tommy David stopped a promising attacking move, taking an excellent catch near his own line after Bryan Williams' up-and-under, before J. P. R. Williams made a potentially try-saving tackle on Batty who had brilliantly recovered another Robertson grubber kick. A desperate clearing kick from Bennett and Quinnell winning two New Zealand lineouts in two minutes ensured that their four-point cushion was maintained, before Duckham, starting inside his own 25-yard line, evaded three All Black defenders with successive side-steps to release David, Fergus Slattery and Willie John McBride in succession, until New Zealand flanker Scown thwarted a certain try for Bevan with a last-ditch tackle. Within minutes of this, however, the All Blacks were once again back on the offensive, with Batty evading Gibson and J. P. R. Williams on the left wing, but his chip-and-chase was thwarted by Bennett covering across to clear the danger.

A few minutes later, Bennett would convert a penalty for the Barbarians after Alex Wyllie had been penalised for side-entry at a ruck, giving the Barbarians a 7-0 lead with about nine minutes of the first half remaining, and it was during these nine minutes that the Barbarians took control of the game. After a clearing kick by Going, Duckham produced the second of his two first-half swashbuckling runs, this time beating five All Black defenders – including a dummy on Ian Hurst that even fooled the cameraman – setting up a superb move that ended with flanker Slattery throwing a one-handed, over-the-head American football-style pass to Dawes who scored a try in the corner, only for Slattery's pass to be adjudged as having gone forward. However, from the ensuing scrum five yards from the New Zealand line, pressure from Edwards forced Going to fumble the ball, which allowed Slattery to scoop up the loose ball and go over for the Barbarians' second try of the half; Bennett's conversion made the score 13-0. In the final minute of the first half, a poor pass from Going to Burgess led to the All Black fly-half throwing an interception to Quinnell. The ball was spread wide to Bevan, who managed to shrug off tackles from Bryan Williams, Ian Hurst and Joe Karam to score a try in the left corner. Bennett's missed conversion from the touchline gave the Barbarians a 17–0 advantage at half-time.

=== Second half ===
==== Batty's brace ====
Refusing to go down without a fight, the All Blacks started the second half strongly, with Hamish Macdonald brilliantly claiming Karam's kickoff, and Burgess launching a nasty up-and-under that J. P. R. Williams failed to claim on his own line, but New Zealand captain Ian Kirkpatrick could not gather the rebound cleanly and knocked on over the line. A few plays later, Slattery was penalised for offside at a maul, but Karam missed the difficult penalty attempt from the right hand side of the pitch. Peter Whiting then also knocked on after a promising attacking move set up by a burst upfield from Kirkpatrick, but Edwards was penalised for not putting the ball in straight at the ensuing scrum, giving Karam a much easier attempt at goal, which he made to cut the deficit to 17–3. J. P. R. Williams then once again displayed his defensive prowess by stopping Bryan Williams in a one-on-one situation that would have otherwise resulted in a certain try for the All Blacks, but the Barbarians were powerless to stop Bryan Williams breaking through the line a few moments later and feeding winger Batty for New Zealand's first try of the match. Karam missed the conversion, but the All Blacks were nonetheless very much back in contention, trailing 17–7 with barely eight minutes of the second half gone.

A missed penalty goal attempt by Bennett aside, New Zealand controlled much of the possession and territory for the next 15 minutes or so, but the Barbarian's stout defence and a few handling errors meant that the All Blacks couldn't capitalise. Half-way through the second half, Going finally succumbed to an ankle injury he had been nursing for most of the half and was replaced by Lin Colling. More good defence from the Barbarians led to Bennett attempting a long-range penalty from just inside his own half that only just missed to the left of the posts. A flurry of kicking exchanges eventually led to Batty taking issue with a late tackle on him by David that was not penalised by referee Georges Domercq, and the two players engaged in a tussle on the touch-line; Batty's involvement and behaviour, though understandable, resulted in him being booed by the partisan crowd every time he touched the ball for the rest of the match. Indeed, these boos intensified a few minutes later when Batty was penalised for shoving Duckham after the whistle had gone.

However, these two incidents seemed to reignite the game. A somewhat speculative cross-field kick by Hurst was picked up by Batty, who then not only evaded the tackle of Dawes but also brilliantly chipped ahead over the head of J. P. R. Williams which he recovered to score his second try of the match; even though the crowd noise was filled with boos for Batty, they nonetheless acknowledged the skill with an appreciative round of applause. Karam, however, once again, could not add the conversion, but New Zealand had successfully cut the deficit to just six points, now trailing 17-11 with just over 10 minutes to go.

==== J.P.R. Williams try and more All Blacks pressure ====
However, the Barbarians then produced one of the highlights of the game to seal victory; commentator Bill McLaren would later describe it in his 1991 documentary "Bill's Best Bits" as being on par with "The Greatest Try Ever Scored", and a passage of play that made you "gasp in wonder". Beginning from a lineout just outside New Zealand's 25, the ball was kept in play for over 90 seconds (a very rare feat for rugby matches of that era) and all 15 Barbarian players touched the ball at least once in the passage of play. Featuring a remarkable reverse pass by Edwards, two sniping runs apiece by Duckham and Gibson, a try-saving tackle by Karam and interception by Colling, Slattery's accurate pass put J. P. R. Williams in space who then side-stepped Karam to score in the corner. Bennett slotted the conversion from the right touchline, receiving a cheer almost as loud as the one that greeted the try, to give the Barbarians a virtually unassailable 23–11 lead with only a few minutes to go.

However, the All Blacks came roaring back with an attack of their own, with Hurst putting Robertson through. Robertson tried to emulate Batty's chip over the head of J. P. R. Williams, but Williams read Robertson's idea and charged the kick down, likely saving yet another try in the process. Although the All Blacks continued to pressure for the remaining minutes and during injury-time, all their forays into the Barbarians 25 were snuffed out by more good Barbarians defence. The Barbarians too managed to launch a couple of their own attacks, with Bevan twice running out of defence brilliantly, the second of which ended when he chose to grubber-kick ahead, not noticing that J. P. R. Williams was free on his left shoulder who would have certainly scored were he to have passed. Batty conjured one last attacking chance for his side, escaping down the left flank, but his inside pass was dropped by Robertson. One final attacking move for the Barbarians was brought to an end after Gibson lost his footing after a cut back inside and knocked on, after which the final whistle was sounded.

==== Post match ====
Immediately after the whistle, the resultant cheers from the crowd was followed instantly by a mass pitch invasion from all sides. Barbarians captain John Dawes was lifted onto the shoulders of the crowd, as was scrum-half Edwards in recognition of his remarkable try scored in the opening minutes of the match.

=== Details ===
27 January 1973

Barbarians	23–11	New Zealand
Try: Edwards; Slattery; Bevan; Williams; Con: Bennett (2); Pen: Bennett	Report	Try: Batty (2); Pen: Karam

Cardiff Arms Park, Cardiff
Referee: Georges Domercq (France)

FB	15	(Wales) J. P. R. Williams
RW	14	(England) David Duckham
OC	13	(Wales) John Dawes (c)
IC	12	(Ireland) Mike Gibson
LW	11	(Wales) John Bevan
FH	10	(Wales) Phil Bennett
SH	9	(Wales) Gareth Edwards
LP	1	(Ireland) Ray McLoughlin
HK	2	(England) John Pullin
TP	3	(Scotland) Sandy Carmichael
LL	4	(Ireland) Willie John McBride
RL	5	(England) Bob Wilkinson
BF	6	(Wales) Tommy David
OF	7	(Ireland) Fergus Slattery
N8	8	(Wales) Derek Quinnell
Replacements:
CE	16	(Wales) Roy Bergiers
CE	17	(Wales) Arthur Lewis
SH	18	(England) Steve Smith
PR	19	(England) Stack Stevens
HK	20	(England) John Gray
Coach:
(Wales) Carwyn James

FB	15	Joe Karam
RW	14	Bryan Williams
OC	13	Bruce Robertson
IC	12	Ian Hurst
LW	11	Grant Batty
FH	10	Bob Burgess
SH	9	Sid Going
LP	1	Graham Whiting
HK	2	Ron Urlich
TP	3	Kent Lambert
LL	4	Hamish Macdonald
RL	5	Peter Whiting
BF	6	Alistair Scown
OF	7	Ian Kirkpatrick (c)
N8	8	Alex Wyllie
Replacements:
SH	16	Lin Colling
WG	17	Duncan Hales
CE	18	Mark Sayers
HK	19	Tane Norton
N8	20	Alan Sutherland
PR	21	Sandy McNicol
Coach:
Bob Duff

Touch judges:
E. M. Lewis (Wales)
D. O. Spyer (England)

== Cliff Morgan's commentary ==
Both the match and "that try" are viewed as synonymous with the commentary of Cliff Morgan, which itself is regarded to be one of the best sports commentaries ever.

The BBCs live commentary of the match was scheduled to be provided by Bill McLaren who had been taken ill with flu the day before the game. As such, former Wales flyhalf and commentor Cliff Morgan was asked to replace him at late notice. Morgan was recovering from his own health issues, after suffering a stroke in March 1972 and losing his ability to speak. In the months preceding the match, Morgan had taken an extensive speech therapy course and had recovered his speech well enough to offer his services in McLaren's absence. Despite receiving many plaudits, Morgan was unsatisfied with his choice of words, arguing that his famous "What a score!" exclamation was superfluous and that he wished he had ended it with "A dramatic start!". Despite this, fellow commentator and colleague Nick Mullins said that Morgan "was really happy with the commentary overall" and that he felt he had "done that moment justice". Mullins praised the commenatry itself adding the Morgan "just loved the prose and the poetry and the music of Wales. When I hear that commentary, that’s certainly what I hear."

Aside from his words during the scoring of "that try" itself, the commentary is remembered for his follow up comments:

"Oh, that fellow Edwards! If the greatest writer of the written word would have written that story, no one would have believed it. That really was something."

For his comments at the final whistle:

"And there we are. This has been a great occasion. Let me not say a word now, as we listen to this crowd and we watch some of the greatest players of the decade; indeed, of all time."

And for his closing comments as the players started to make their way down the tunnel:

"And what this crowd has seen today has been not strictly a treat of running rugby; it's also been thoughtful rugby. It's been the type of play that John Dawes, Carwyn James and company played against the All Blacks when the last Lions played there. It's been a pleasure to watch, and those of us who have seen it here, and those millions all over the world who have been with us, have really been very privileged people indeed."

== Legacy ==
Often known simply as "that try", the try is frequently mentioned as the greatest ever scored or one of the greatest. In a UK poll conducted by Channel 4 in 2002, Edwards's try was voted number 20 in the list of the 100 Greatest Sporting Moments. The 40th anniversary of the try sparked renewed interest.

On 10th June 2015 the Penderyn distillery launched a peated single malt Welsh whisky simply named "That Try" as the fourth release in its Icons of Wales limited-edition series. The whisky celebrates Edwards' famous try and was packaged in a black and white striped box to match the Barbarians' shirts and featured a commissioned drawing of Gareth Edwards.
