= 1972–73 New Zealand rugby union tour of Britain, Ireland, France and North America =

- Manager: Ernie Todd
- Tour captain: Ian Kirkpatrick
- Top point scorer: Joe Karam (145)
- Top try scorer: Grant Batty (21)
- Top test point scorer: Joe Karam (27)
- Top test try scorer(s): Sid Going (2); Alex Wyllie (2)
Summary
P	W	D	L
Total
32	25	2	5
Test match
5	3	1	1
Opponent
P	W	D	L
England
1	1	0	0
France
1	0	0	1
Ireland
1	0	1	0
Scotland
1	1	0	0
Wales
1	1	0	0

The 1972–73 New Zealand rugby union tour of the Britain, Ireland, France and North America was a collection of rugby union test match games undertaken by the All Blacks against England, Scotland, Wales, Ireland and France. The tour also took in several matches against British, Irish, French and North American club, county and invitational teams. This was the seventh tour of the Northern Hemisphere. It was also the first time the All Blacks lost to the invitational Barbarians team.

In the club matches, the team only lost to Llanelli, North-Western Counties, Midland Counties (West), and the Barbarians, and drew with Munster. In the tests played the team won against Wales, Scotland and England, drew with Ireland and lost to France. This was their fifth "Grand Slam tour" after 1905–06 (lost to Wales), 1935–36 (lost to Wales and England), 1953–54 (lost to Wales), 1963–64 (Drew with Scotland). They had to wait until 1978 for a "Grand Slam".

== Touring party ==
- Manager: Ernie Todd
- Assistant Manager: Bob Duff
- Captain: Ian Kirkpatrick

=== Backs ===
- Joe Karam (Wellington)
- Trevor Morris (Nelson-Bays)
- Bryan Williams (Auckland)
- Grant Batty (Wellington)
- Duncan Hales (Canterbury)
- George Skudder (Waikato)
- Bruce Robertson (Counties)
- Ian Hurst (Canterbury)
- Mike Parkinson (Poverty Bay)
- Mark Sayers (Wellington)
- Bob Burgess (Manawatu)
- Ian Stevens (Wellington)
- Sid Going (North Auckland)
- Lin Colling (Otago)

=== Forwards ===
- Alan Sutherland (Marlborough)
- Alex Wyllie (Canterbury)
- Bevan Holmes (North Auckland)
- Ian Kirkpatrick (Poverty Bay)
- Ken Stewart (Southland)
- Alistair Scown (Taranaki)
- Hamish Macdonald (Canterbury)
- Ian Eliason (Taranaki)
- Andy Haden (Auckland)
- Peter Whiting (Auckland)
- Keith Murdoch (Otago)
- Jeff Matheson (Otago)
- Kent Lambert (Manawatu)
- Graham Whiting (King Country)
- Ron Urlich (Auckland)
- Tane Norton (Canterbury)
- Lindsay Clark (Otago), replacement during tour
- Sandy McNicol (Wanganui), replacement during tour

== Test matches ==
=== Wales ===
2 December 1972

Wales	16–19	New Zealand
Bevan (4 – 1t); Bennett (12 – 4pg)	Report	(4 – 1t) Murdoch (15 – 5pg) Karam

Cardiff Arms Park, Cardiff
Referee: R. F. Johnson (England)

FB	15	J. P. R. Williams
RW	14	Gerald Davies
IC	13	Jim Shanklin
OC	12	Roy Bergiers
LW	11	John Bevan
FH	10	Phil Bennett
SH	9	Gareth Edwards
LP	1	Glyn Shaw
HK	2	Jeff Young
TP	3	Barry Llewelyn
LL	4	Derek Quinnell
RL	5	Delme Thomas (c)
BF	6	Dai Morris
OF	7	John Taylor
N8	8	Mervyn Davies

FB	15	Joe Karam
RW	14	Bryan Williams
IC	13	Duncan Hales
OC	12	Mike Parkinson
LW	11	Grant Batty
FH	10	Bob Burgess
SH	9	Sid Going
LP	1	Jeff Matheson
HK	2	Tane Norton
TP	3	Keith Murdoch
LL	4	Hamish Macdonald
RL	5	Peter Whiting
BF	6	Alex Wyllie
OF	7	Ian Kirkpatrick (c)
N8	8	Alan Sutherland

=== Scotland ===
16 December 1972

Scotland	9–14	New Zealand
Irvine (6 – 2pg); McGeechan (3 – 1dg)	Report	(4 – 1t) Batty (4 – 1t) Going (4 – 1t) Wyllie (2 – 1c) Karam

Murrayfield Stadium, Edinburgh
Referee: G. Domercq (France)

FB	15	Andy Irvine
RW	14	William Steele
IC	13	Ian Forsyth
OC	12	Jim Renwick
LW	11	David Shedden
FH	10	Ian McGeechan
SH	9	Ian McCrae
LP	1	Ian McLauchlan
HK	2	Robert Clark
TP	3	Sandy Carmichael
LL	4	Alastair McHarg
RL	5	Gordon Brown
BF	6	Nairn MacEwan
OF	7	Rodger Arneil
N8	8	Peter Brown (c)

FB	15	Joe Karam
RW	14	Bryan Williams
IC	13	Bruce Robertson
OC	12	Mike Parkinson
LW	11	Grant Batty
FH	10	Ian Stevens
SH	9	Sid Going
LP	1	Graham Whiting
HK	2	Tane Norton
TP	3	Jeff Matheson
LL	4	Peter Whiting
RL	5	Hamish Macdonald
BF	6	Alistair Scown
OF	7	Ian Kirkpatrick (c)
N8	8	Alex Wyllie

=== England ===
6 January 1973

England	0–9	New Zealand
	Report	(4 – 1t) Kirkpatrick (2 – 1c) Karam (3 – 1dg) Williams

Twickenham Stadium, London
Referee: J. Young (Scotland)

FB	15	Sam Doble
RW	14	Alan Morley
IC	13	Peter Preece
OC	12	Peter Warfield
LW	11	David Duckham
FH	10	John Finlan
SH	9	Jan Webster
LP	1	Stack Stevens
HK	2	John Pullin (c)
TP	3	Frank Anderson
LL	4	Peter Larter
RL	5	Chris Ralston
BF	6	John Watkins
OF	7	Tony Neary
N8	8	Andy Ripley

FB	15	Joe Karam
RW	14	Bryan Williams
IC	13	Bruce Robertson
OC	12	Mike Parkinson
LW	11	Grant Batty
FH	10	Ian Stevens
SH	9	Sid Going
LP	1	Graham Whiting
HK	2	Tane Norton
TP	3	Kent Lambert
LL	4	Hamish Macdonald
RL	5	Peter Whiting
BF	6	Alex Wyllie
OF	7	Ian Kirkpatrick (c)
N8	8	Alan Sutherland

=== Ireland ===
20 January 1973

Ireland	10–10	New Zealand
Grace (4 – 1t); McGann (6 – 2pg)	Report (Archive link)	(4 – 1t) Going (4 – 1t) Alex Wyllie (2 – 1c) Karam

Lansdowne Road, Dublin
Referee: M. Joseph (Wales)

FB	15	Tom Kiernan (c)
RW	14	Tom Grace
IC	13	Kevin Flynn
OC	12	Mike Gibson
LW	11	Wallace McMaster
FH	10	Barry McGann
SH	9	John Moloney
LP	1	Ray McLoughlin
HK	2	Ken Kennedy
TP	3	Sean Lynch
LL	4	Willie John McBride
RL	5	Kevin Mays
BF	6	Jimmy Davidson
OF	7	Fergus Slattery
N8	8	Terry Moore

FB	15	Joe Karam
RW	14	Bryan Williams
IC	13	Bruce Robertson
OC	12	Ian Hurst
LW	11	Grant Batty
FH	10	Bob Burgess
SH	9	Sid Going
LP	1	Graham Whiting
HK	2	Tane Norton
TP	3	Kent Lambert
LL	4	Peter Whiting
RL	5	Hamish Macdonald
BF	6	Alex Wyllie
OF	7	Ian Kirkpatrick (c)
N8	8	Alan Sutherland

=== France ===
10 February 1973

France	13–6	New Zealand
Bertranne (4 – 1t); Dourthe (4 – 1t); Romeu (5 – 1c, 1pg)	Report	(6 – 2pg) Karam

Parc des Princes, Paris
Referee: D. P. d'Arcy (Ireland)

FB	15	Jack Cantoni
RW	14	Roland Bertranne
IC	13	Claude Dourthe
OC	12	Jean-Pierre Lux
LW	11	André Campaes
FH	10	Jean-Pierre Romeu
SH	9	Max Barrau
LP	1	Jean-Louis Azarete
HK	2	René Bénésis
TP	3	Jean Iraçabal
LL	4	Élie Cester
RL	5	Alain Estève
BF	6	Olivier Saïsset
OF	7	Pierre Biémouret
N8	8	Walter Spanghero (c)

FB	15	Joe Karam
RW	14	Bryan Williams
IC	13	Bruce Robertson
OC	12	Ian Hurst
LW	11	Grant Batty
FH	10	Ian Stevens
SH	9	Sid Going
LP	1	Graham Whiting
HK	2	Tane Norton
TP	3	Kent Lambert
LL	4	Peter Whiting
RL	5	Hamish Macdonald
BF	6	Alex Wyllie
OF	7	Ian Kirkpatrick (c)
N8	8	Alan Sutherland

== Non-international matches ==
Scores and results list New Zealand's points tally first.

N°	Opposing Team	F	A	Date	Venue	Captain
1	(British Columbia) British Columbia	31	9	19 October 1972	(British Columbia) Brockton Oval, Vancouver	Ian Kirkpatrick
2	(New York (state)) New York Metropolitan	41	9	21 October 1972	(New York (state)) Downing Stadium, New York	Sid Going
3	(England) Western Counties	39	12	28 October 1972	(England) Kingsholm, Gloucester	Ian Kirkpatrick
4	(Wales) Llanelli	3	9	31 October 1972	(Wales) Stradey Park, Llanelli	Ian Kirkpatrick
5	(Wales) Cardiff	20	4	4 November 1972	(Wales) Cardiff Arms Park, Cardiff	Ian Kirkpatrick
6	(England) Cambridge University	34	3	8 November 1972	(England) Grange Road, Cambridge	Sid Going
7	(England) London Counties	24	3	11 November 1972	(England) Twickenham, London	Ian Kirkpatrick
8	(Leinster) Leinster	17	9	15 November 1972	(Republic of Ireland) Lansdowne Road, Dublin	Sid Going
9	(Ulster) Ulster	19	6	18 November 1972	(Northern Ireland) Ravenhill, Belfast	Ian Kirkpatrick
10	(England) North-Western Counties	14	16	21 November 1972	(England) Ellis Sports Ground, Workington	Ian Kirkpatrick
11	(Scotland) Rest of Scottish Districts	26	6	23 November 1972	(Scotland) Mansfield Park, Hawick	Ian Kirkpatrick
12	(Monmouthshire (historic)) Gwent	16	7	28 November 1972	(Wales) Welfare Sports Ground, Ebbw Vale	Ian Kirkpatrick
13	(England) Midland Counties (West)	8	16	6 December 1972	(England) The Reddings, Moseley	Ian Kirkpatrick
14	(England) North-Eastern Counties	9	3	9 December 1972	(England) Lidget Green, Bradford	Ian Kirkpatrick
15	(Scotland) Glasgow - Edinburgh	16	10	12 December 1972	(Scotland) Little Hughenden Park, Glasgow	Alex Wyllie
16	(England) Southern Counties	23	6	20 December 1972	(England) Iffley Road, Oxford	Ian Kirkpatrick
17	(England) Combined Services	31	10	26 December 1972	(England) Twickenham, London	Alex Wyllie
18	(Wales) East Glamorgan	20	9	30 December 1972	(Wales) Cardiff Arms Park, Cardiff	Ian Kirkpatrick
19	(England) South-Western Counties	30	7	2 January 1973	(England) The Recreation Ground, Redruth	Ian Kirkpatrick
20	(Newport, Wales) Newport	20	15	10 January 1973	(Wales) Rodney Parade, Newport	Sid Going
21	(England) Midland Counties (East)	43	12	13 January 1973	(England) Welford Road, Leicester	Ian Kirkpatrick
22	(Munster) Munster	3	3	16 January 1973	(Republic of Ireland) Musgrave Park, Cork	Alex Wyllie
23	(Wales) Neath and Aberavon	43	3	24 January 1973	(Wales) The Gnoll, Neath	Ian Kirkpatrick
24	Barbarians	11	23	27 January 1973	(Wales) Cardiff Arms Park, Cardiff	Ian Kirkpatrick
25	(France) South-West Selection	12	3	31 January 1973	(France) Tarbes Stadium, Tarbes	Ian Kirkpatrick
26	(France) France 'B'	23	8	3 February 1973	(France) Stade Municipal, Lyon	Ian Kirkpatrick
27	(France) French Selection	6	3	7 February 1973	(France) Stade Marcel-Michelin, Clermont-Ferrand	Sid Going

=== Barbarians ===
27 January 1973

Barbarians	23–11	New Zealand
Try: Edwards; Slattery; Bevan; Williams; Con: Bennett (2); Pen: Bennett	Report	Try: Batty (2); Pen: Karam

National Stadium, Cardiff
Referee: Georges Domercq (France)

FB	15	(Wales) J. P. R. Williams
RW	14	(England) David Duckham
OC	13	(Wales) John Dawes (c)
IC	12	(Ireland) Mike Gibson
LW	11	(Wales) John Bevan
FH	10	(Wales) Phil Bennett
SH	9	(Wales) Gareth Edwards
LP	1	(Ireland) Ray McLoughlin
HK	2	(England) John Pullin
TP	3	(Scotland) Sandy Carmichael
LL	4	(Ireland) Willie John McBride
RL	5	(England) Bob Wilkinson
BF	6	(Wales) Tommy David
OF	7	(Ireland) Fergus Slattery
N8	8	(Wales) Derek Quinnell

FB	15	Joe Karam
RW	14	Bryan Williams
OC	13	Bruce Robertson
IC	12	Ian Hurst
LW	11	Grant Batty
FH	10	Bob Burgess
SH	9	Sid Going
LP	1	Graham Whiting
HK	2	Ron Urlich
TP	3	Kent Lambert
LL	4	Hamish Macdonald
RL	5	Peter Whiting
BF	6	Alistair Scown
OF	7	Ian Kirkpatrick (c)
N8	8	Alex Wyllie

== See also ==
- End-of-year rugby union internationals
