= Llanelli RFC 9–3 New Zealand =

Llanelli 9–3 New Zealand
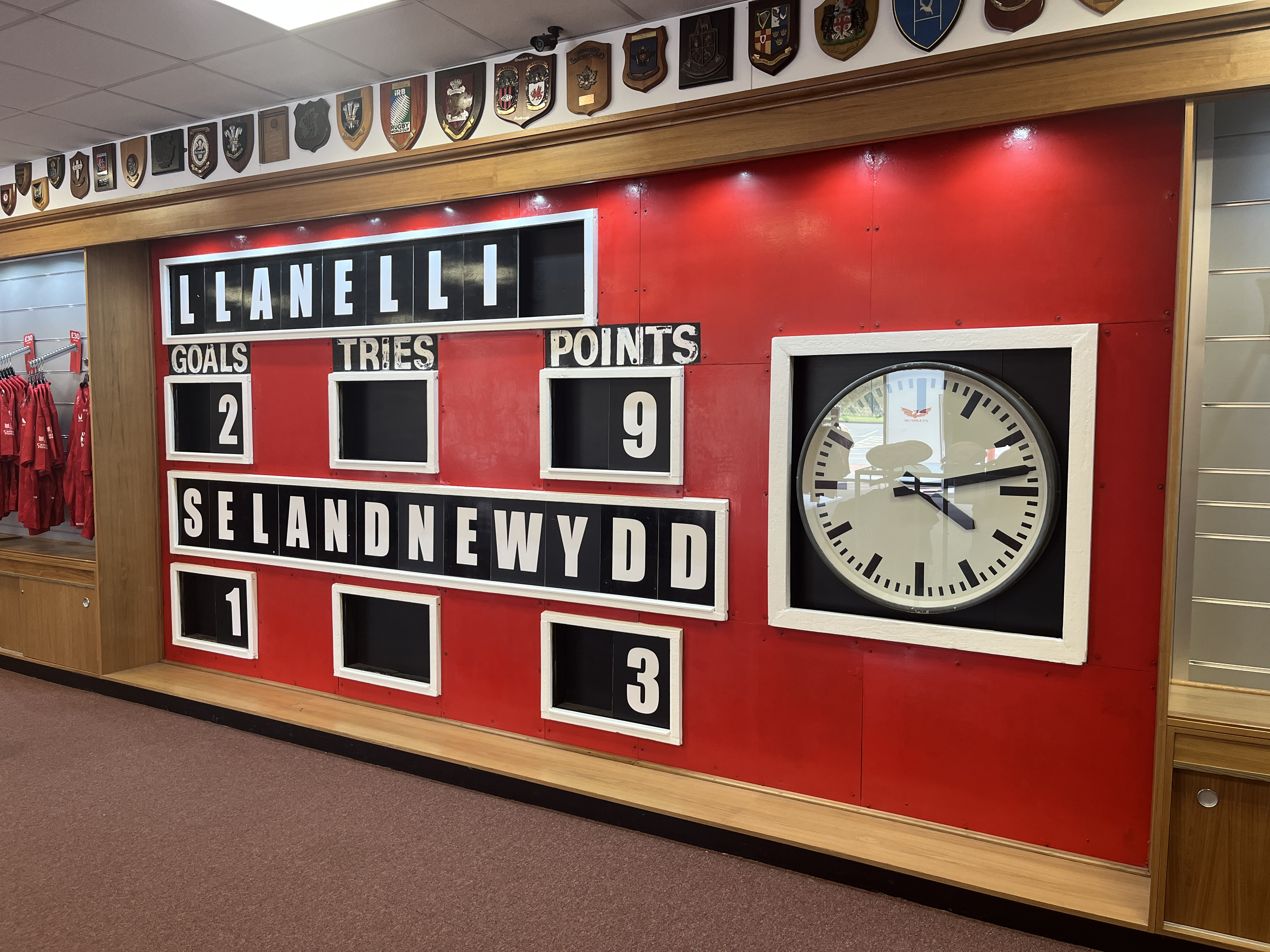
- Replica scoreboard on display in the Scarlets club shop
Llanelli	New Zealand
(Wales)	(New Zealand)
9	3
- Date: 31 October 1972
- Venue: Stradey Park, Llanelli
- Referee: Mike Titcomb (England)
- Attendance: 22,000

As part of their 1972–73 tour of the Northern Hemisphere, the New Zealand national rugby union team's fourth match saw them take on Llanelli RFC of Wales at Stradey Park, Llanelli, on 31 October 1972. In one of the most famous results in rugby union history, Llanelli won the match 9–3 in front of 20,000 spectators, with Llanelli centre Roy Bergiers scoring the only try of the game.

Remembered as the "day the pubs ran dry", the result was immortalised by Welsh entertainer Max Boyce, whose poem 9–3 appears as the opening track on his Live at Treorchy album.

== Background ==
The New Zealand national rugby union team were on a run of 16 unbeaten matches since the loss to the British Lions in July 1971. As part of their 1972–73 New Zealand rugby union tour of Britain, Ireland, France and North America, New Zealand would play 32 matches, with their visit to Stradey Park to play Llanelli RFC being their fourth match of the tour, and their first in Europe. In North America, New Zealand had already beaten sides representing British Columbia (31–3) on 19 October 1972 and New York Metropolitan (41–9) on 21 October, followed by a 39–12 win over a Western Counties side in Gloucester on their arrival in England a week later.

The victorious coach of that 1971 Lions tour, Carwyn James had coached Llanelli since 1969 but spent much of his first year back from the tour planning a way to beat New Zealand again, on 31 October 1972. James heavily rotated the Llanelli squad and brought in a number of new players specifically with the All Blacks match in mind. On the morning of the match, James brought the players together in a hotel so that rather than just meeting at the ground they could travel to Stradey Park on the same coach. One of James' new players was the 21 year old Ray Gravell who suffered with pre-match nerves and was particularly nervous on this occasion. James instructed his captain, Delme Thomas to sit next to Gravell on the bus journey to Stradey Park and Thomas put an arm around Gravell and kept him distracted with small talk.

== Matchday ==
At the ground, 22,000 fans had packed into the stands. Captain Thomas gave what was later described as a deeply intense team talk, followed by another notable speech by coach James which moved players such as Phil Bennett, Ray Gravell and Delme Thomas to tears.

An early penalty kick from Phil Bennett hitting the posts. The kick was collected by New Zealand scrum-half Lin Colling who in attempting to clear his lines, had his kick charged down by Roy Bergiers who collected the lose ball to score the game's only try. Bennett succeeded with his second kick of the match, the conversion to make it 6-0 to the home side after just two minutes.

The rest of the match was a tense and physical affair, with the Llanelli flanker Gareth Jenkins describing it as "the most physical game I've ever played in". New Zealand full-back Joe Karam scored his team's only points through a penalty kick, before the Llanelli wing Andy Hill kicked a penalty of his own to secure a 9-3 victory for the Scarlets. Both Jenkins and Chico Hopkins would later state that they were knocked unconscious during play, and a few minutes from the final whistle, Gravell was trampled underfoot by Keith Murdoch, leaving him nearly unconscious and with blurred vision.

== Aftermath ==
Later in the tour, Carwyn James and the Llanelli players of Phil Bennett, Derek Quinnell and Tommy David would again face the All Blacks, this time with the Barbarians in their first ever victory over the All Blacks the following January.

The Llanelli game is remembered as the "day the pubs ran dry" and has become part of Welsh rugby folklore, immortalised in works such as the song 9–3 by Max Boyce.

== Match details ==
31 October 1972

Llanelli	9–3	New Zealand
Try: Bergiers c Con: Bennett; Pen: Hill	Report	Pen: Karam

Stradey Park, Llanelli
Attendance: 22,000
Referee: Mike Titcomb (England)

FB	15	Roger Davies
RW	14	J. J. Williams
OC	13	Roy Bergiers
IC	12	Ray Gravell
LW	11	Andy Hill
FH	10	Phil Bennett
SH	9	Chico Hopkins
N8	8	Hefin Jenkins
OF	7	Gareth Jenkins
BF	6	Tommy David
RL	5	Derek Quinnell
LL	4	Delme Thomas (c)
TP	3	Barry Llewelyn
HK	2	Roy Thomas
LP	1	Tony Crocker
Replacements:
SH	16	Selwyn Williams
FL	17	Alan James
PR	18	Chris Charles
LK	19	Brian Llewellyn
FH	20	Gwyn Ashby
HK	21	Meirion Davies
Coach:
(Wales) Carwyn James

FB	15	Joe Karam
RW	14	Bryan Williams	Substituted off
OC	13	Bruce Robertson
IC	12	Mark Sayers
LW	11	Duncan Hales
FH	10	Bob Burgess
SH	9	Lin Colling
N8	8	Alan Sutherland
OF	7	Ian Kirkpatrick (c)
BF	6	Alistair Scown
RL	5	Peter Whiting
LL	4	Andy Haden
TP	3	Graham Whiting
HK	2	Ron Urlich
LP	1	Keith Murdoch
Replacements:
WG	16	Grant Batty	Substituted on
Coach:
(New Zealand) Bob Duff

Touch judges:
J. Kelleher (Wales)
D. G. Watts (Wales)
