= 1976 New Zealand rugby union tour of South Africa =

- Manager: Noel Stanley
- Tour captain: Andy Leslie
Summary
P	W	D	L
Total
24	18	0	6
Test match
4	1	0	3
Opponent
P	W	D	L
South Africa
4	1	0	3

In 1976, the All Blacks toured South Africa, with the blessing of the then-newly elected New Zealand Prime Minister, Rob Muldoon. Twenty-five African nations, Afghanistan, Burma, Guyana, Iraq, Sri Lanka and Syria protested against this by boycotting the 1976 Summer Olympics in Montreal. In their view the All Black tour gave tacit support to the apartheid regime in South Africa. The five Māori players on the tour, Bill Bush, Sid Going, Kent Lambert, Bill Osborne and Tane Norton, as well as ethnic-Samoan Bryan Williams, were offered honorary white status in South Africa. Bush asserts that he was deliberately provocative toward the apartheid regime while he was there.

The All Blacks achieved a record of 18 wins and 6 losses, and they lost the test series 3–1.

== Matches ==
Scores and results list New Zealand's points tally first.

Opposing Team	For	Against	Date	Venue	Status
Border/North East Cape	24	0	30 June 1976	Border R.U. Ground, East London	Tour Match
Eastern Province	28	15	3 July 1976	Boet Erasmus Stadium, Port Elizabeth	Tour Match
South African Proteas	25	3	7 July 1976	Goodwood, Cape Town	Tour Match
SA Invitation XV	31	24	10 July 1976	Newlands, Cape Town	Tour Match
Boland	42	6	14 July 1976	Boland Stadium, Wellington (South Africa)	Tour Match
Western Province	11	12	17 July 1976	Newlands, Cape Town	Tour Match
SA Gazelles	21	15	20 July 1976	Boet Erasmus Stadium, Port Elizabeth	Tour Match
South Africa	7	16	24 July 1976	Kings Park, Durban	Test Match
Western Transvaal	42	3	28 July 1976	Olen Park, Potchefstroom	Tour Match
Transvaal	12	10	31 July 1976	Ellis Park, Johannesburg	Tour Match
South African Universities	21	9	4 August 1976	Loftus Versfeld, Pretoria	Tour Match
Eastern Transvaal	26	12	7 August 1976	Pam Brink Stadium, Springs	Tour Match
Orange Free State Country Invitation XV	31	6	10 August 1976	Welkom Ground, Welkom	Tour Match
South Africa	15	9	14 August 1976	Free State Stadium, Bloemfontein	Test Match
Quagga-Barbarians	32	31	18 August 1976	Ellis Park, Johannesburg	Tour Match
Northern Transvaal	27	29	21 August 1976	Loftus Versfeld, Pretoria	Tour Match
Transvaal Country Invitation XV	48	13	24 August 1976	Witbank Ground, Witbank	Tour Match
Natal	42	13	28 August 1976	King's Park, Durban	Tour Match
Leopards	31	0	31 August 1976	Mdantsane, East London	Tour Match
South Africa	10	15	4 September 1976	Newlands, Cape Town	Test Match
NW Cape Invitation XV	34	17	6 September 1976	Danie Kuys Stadium, Upington	Tour Match
Orange Free State	10	15	11 September 1976	Free State Stadium, Bloemfontein	Tour Match
Griqualand West	26	3	14 September 1976	de Beers Stadium, Kimberley	Tour Match
South Africa	14	15	18 September 1976	Ellis Park, Johannesburg	Test Match

== Touring party ==
- Manager: Noel Stanley (Taranaki)
- Assistant Manager (and Coach): JJ Stewart (Wanganui)
- Captain: Andy Leslie

Name	Position	Local Club	Province (NZRU)	Age (in 1976)	Height	Occupation	Caps
Kit Fawcett	Fullback	NZ Universities	Auckland	22	6'1"	Student	–
Laurie Mains	Fullback	Southern	Otago	30	5'11"	Land Agent	4
Grant Batty	Three-quarters	Otumoetai Cadets	Bay of Plenty	24	5'5"	Manager	10
Terry Mitchell	Three-quarters	Linwood	Canterbury	25	5'8"	Carpenter	–
Bill Osborne	Three-quarters	Kaierau	Wanganui	20	5'9"	Stock agent	1
Neil Purvis	Three-quarters	Wanaka	Otago	24	5'10"	Farmer	1
Bruce Robertson	Three-quarters	Ardmore College	Counties	23	6'1"	Teacher	10
Bryan Williams	Three-quarters	Ponsonby	Auckland	25	5'10"	Lawyer	22
Doug Bruce	Five-eighth	Oxford	Canterbury	28	5'10"	Teacher	–
Lyn Jaffray	Five-eighth	Eastern	Otago	25	5'10"	Lamb buyer	3
Joe Morgan	Five-eighth	Mid-Northern	North Auckland	30	5'10"	Farmer	2
Duncan Robertson	Five-eighth	Zingari-Richmond	Otago	29	5'10"	Builder	6
Lyn Davis	Scrum-half	Suburbs	Canterbury	32	5'8"	Commercial grower	1
Sid Going	Scrum-half	Mid-Northern	North Auckland	32	5'7"	Farmer	22
Andy Leslie	No. 8	Petone	Wellington	31	6'2"	Mercer	6
Alan Sutherland	No. 8	Opawa	Marlborough	31	6'3"	Shearer	11
Kevin Eveleigh	Flanker	Feilding	Manawatu	28	6'0"	Farm contractor	–
Ian Kirkpatrick	Flanker	Ngapata	Poverty Bay	29	6'3"	Farmer	30
Lawrie Knight	Flanker	Ngapata	Poverty Bay	26	6'3"	Doctor	–
Ken Stewart	Flanker	Balfour	Southland	23	6'0"	Farmer	7
Hamish Macdonald	Lock	Kaikohe	North Auckland	28	6'3"	Farmer	9
Frank Oliver	Lock	Invercargill Marist	Southland	27	6'3"	Tree Planter	–
Gary Seear	Lock	Southern	Otago	24	6'5"	Draughtsman	–
Peter Whiting	Lock	Ponsonby	Auckland	29	6'6"	Teacher	16
Billy Bush	Prop	Belfast	Canterbury	27	6'1"	Commercial fisherman	4
Brad Johnstone	Prop	North Shore	Auckland	25	6'3"	Builder	–
Kent Lambert	Prop	Technical College Old Boys	Manawatu	24	5'11"	Shearer	6
Kerry Tanner	Prop	New Brighton	Canterbury	29	6'2"	Publican	6
Graeme Crossman	Hooker	Eastern Districts	Bay of Plenty	30	5'10"	Teacher	–
Tane Norton	Hooker	Linwood	Canterbury	32	6'0"	Company representative	19
Perry Harris	Prop (tour replacement)	Te Kawau	Manawatu	30	6'1"	Farmer	–
