= 1973 International Seven-a-side Tournament =

Tournament details
- Host nation: Scotland
- Dates: 7 April 1973 – 7 April 1973
- No. of nations: 7 (plus a SRU President's VII)

Final positions
- Champions: England
- Runner-up: Ireland

Tournament statistics
- Matches played: 13

The 1973 International Seven-a-side tournament was the first rugby sevens tournament to feature national representative teams, predating the first official Rugby World Cup Sevens by twenty years. Held in Scotland as part of the Scottish Rugby Union's centenary celebrations, the tournament featured players from all eight of the members of the IRB. Although not sanctioned by the IRB as an official world cup the winners, England, were hailed by the press as the world seven-a-side champions.

== Background ==
1973 was the centenary year of the Scottish Rugby Union ("SRU") and as part of the centenary celebrations the SRU decided to hold an international Rugby sevens tournament. The president of the SRU at the time, A.W. Wilson, later wrote of the decision to hold a sevens tournament, "It seemed most appropriate to us, in our Centenary Year, that we should pay some regard to a part of the game which has proved exhilarating and entertaining to us. One might say, a part of the heritage of Scotland and, of course, especially the Borders. An international Seven-a-side Tournament was the answer. All the countries taking part were and are thrilled at this prospect."

The tournament was not advertised as a world cup but rather was styled "The International Seven-a-side tournament". It was held on 7 April 1973 in Edinburgh, and all the International Rugby Football Board countries were represented, with the exception of South Africa. There was, however, South African representation in the form of several players in the eighth side in the tournament, the President's VII.

As in 1883 when the Scots invented Rugby Sevens, the tournament was to lead a trend. However, even though sevens had been established for 90 years, even the event program recognised its contemporary status by the inclusion in the inside front cover of an advertisement for Peter Scott Knitwear, featuring a man and woman in sweaters, looking amazed and accompanied by the caption: "International Seven-a-sides. What next?". The programme for the event also sported the new coat of arms of the SRU that was granted by the Lord Lyon King of Arms on 28 February 1973, for the centenary season. The coat of arms is still in use today, but in the main the SRU use the commercial thistle logo on jerseys and stationery. The coat of arms has the motto "Non Sine Gloria", meaning "Not Without Glory".

== Participating nations ==
The eight teams were divided into two pools of four as follows with each team playing each other within their pool once. The winners of each Pool went through to contest the final:

Pool A	Pool B
Ireland; New Zealand; Scotland (hosts); Australia	England; Wales; France; SRU President's VII

== Results ==
=== Pool A ===
Team	Pld	W	L	PF	PA	+/-	Pts
Ireland	3	3	0	62	34	28	6
New Zealand	3	2	1	58	50	8	4
Scotland	3	1	2	42	60	-18	2
Australia	3	0	3	28	46	-18	0

7 April 1973
13:30

Australia	12 – 14 (HT:0 – 6)	Scotland

Murrayfield, Edinburgh, Scotland

7 April 1973
13:48

Ireland	22 – 18 (HT:10 – 6)	New Zealand

Murrayfield, Edinburgh, Scotland

7 April 1973
14:42

Australia	4 – 16 (HT:0 – 10)	Ireland

Murrayfield, Edinburgh, Scotland

7 April 1973
15:00

Scotland	16 – 24 (HT:10 – 6)	New Zealand

Murrayfield, Edinburgh, Scotland

7 April 1973
15:54

Scotland	12 – 24 (HT:12 – 6)	Ireland

Murrayfield, Edinburgh, Scotland

7 April 1973
16:12

New Zealand	16 – 12 (HT:6 – 6)	Australia

Murrayfield, Edinburgh, Scotland

=== Pool B ===
Team	Pld	W	L	PF	PA	+/-	Pts
England	3	3	0	70	26	44	6
Wales	3	2	1	76	38	38	4
President's VII	3	1	2	46	70	-24	2
France	3	0	3	20	78	-58	0

7 April 1973
14:06

England	22 – 0 (HT:12 – 0)	France

Murrayfield, Edinburgh, Scotland

7 April 1973
14:24

President's VII	10 – 30 (HT:6 – 12)	Wales

Murrayfield, Edinburgh, Scotland

7 April 1973
15:18

England	24 – 16 (HT:16 – 4)	President's VII

Murrayfield, Edinburgh, Scotland

7 April 1973
15:36

France	4 – 36 (HT:0 – 24)	Wales

Murrayfield, Edinburgh, Scotland

7 April 1973
16:30

France	16 – 20; After Extra Time (HT:10 – 4)	President's VII

Murrayfield, Edinburgh, Scotland

7 April 1973
16:48

England	24 – 10 (HT:12 – 4)	Wales

Murrayfield, Edinburgh, Scotland

=== Final ===
7 April 1973
17:25

Ireland	18 – 22	England

Murrayfield, Edinburgh, Scotland

== Squads ==
The eight teams were divided into two pools of four as follows: Source: The primary source for the squads below is the Official programme for the tournament. Wherever it is known that the players who played on the day differ from the programme details, this takes precedence, and is noted.

=== Pool A ===
Australia: Jersey colour: Gold; 7 - J J M'Lean .; 6 - David L'Estrange .; 5 - R L Fairfax .; 4 - John Hipwell .; 3 - BD Stumbles .; 2 - PD Sullivan .; 1 - D R Burnet .; 8 - Garrick Fay .; 9 - DA Dunworth .	New Zealand: Jersey colour: Black; 7 - GB Batty .; 6 - GR Skudder .; 5 - DA Hales .; 4 - IN Stevens .; 3 - AR Sutherland .; 2 - AJ Wyllie .; 1 - D R Burnet .; 8 - GL Colling .; 9 - AI Scown .	Scotland: Jersey colour: Blue; 7 - AD Gill (Gala); 6 - JNN Frame (Gala); 5 - CM Telfer (Hawick); 4 - S Davidson (Hawick); 3 - Peter Brown (Gala); 2 - JG Brown (Gala); 1 - A Brown (Gala)^{2}; 8 - IR McGeechan (Headingley); 9 - GM Strachan (Jordanhill)	Ireland: Jersey colour: Green; 7 - V Becker (Lansdowne); 6 - AW McMaster (Ballymena); 5 - CMH Gibson (NIFC); 4 - D.M. Canniffe (Cork Con)^{1}; 3 - JF Slattery (Blackrock College); 2 - PC Whelan (Garryowen); 1 - KMA Mays (University College, Dublin); 8 - TAP Moore (Highfield); 9 - JP Dennison (Garryowen)

==== Notes to Pool A ====
1. JJ Moloney of St Mary's College was named in the programme for Ireland instead of D.M. Canniffe, but was unable to play.
2. GK Oliver of Gala was named in the programme for Scotland but his teammate, Arthur Brown, is known to have played instead.

=== Pool B ===
France: Jersey colour: Blue; - A Campaes .; - A Moretti .; - J Trillo .; - R Astre .; - B Dauga .; - J-L Ugartemendia .; - V Boffelli .; - A Dussang .; - D Vacher .	England: Jersey colour: White; 7 - K J Fielding Moseley RFC; 6 - D J Duckham Coventry; 5 - P A Rossborough Coventry; 4 - S J Smith Sale; 3 - Fran Cotton (c) Loughborough Colleges; 2 - J D Gray Coventry; 1 - A G Ripley Rosslyn Park; 8 - R M Uttley Gosforth; 9 - P S Preece Coventry	President's VII: Jersey colour: White; 7 - D Shedden (West of Scotland); 6 - Andy Irvine (Heriot's F.P.); 5 - Jim Renwick (Hawick); 4 - J Henderson (Melrose); 3 - Jan Ellis (South Africa); 2 - RL Clark (Edinburgh Wanderers); 1 - PJF Greyling (South Africa); 8 - RA Carlson (South Africa); 9 - Nairn MacEwan (Gala)	Wales: Jersey colour: Red; 7 - J.J. Williams (Llanelli); 6 - TGR Davies (London Welsh); 5 - P Bennett (Llanelli); 4 - GO Edwards (Cardiff); 3 - TM Davies (Swansea); 2 - J Taylor (London Welsh); 1 - J. P. R. Williams (London Welsh); 8 - G Shaw (Neath); 9 - IM Lewis (Bridgend)

== Summary ==
The teams put forward by the various nations featured many names with test-status fifteen-aside careers. The Scottish side had a number of sevens specialists, many from the Gala club that itself had for a number of years previous had an excellent run of form. The three Browns, all unrelated, Frame and Gill all from the Gala club joined a former Galalean in Stan Davidson and Colin Telfer, as the main Scottish side. Another Gala player, Nairn MacEwan, was on the bench for the President's VII. In the group stages, the tournament had a huge upset when a star-studded Welsh team including Gareth Edwards, Gerald Davies, Phil Bennett, and J. P. R. Williams were beaten by an England side that included a number of Loughborough Colleges students.

The groups were dominated by Ireland and England who both emerged with a perfect 3 wins out of 3. The final was an extremely close affair and Ireland missed out on the title by the smallest of rugby margins. In injury time, Ireland were leading 18-16 and were in the England 22. Fergus Slattery needed only to hold on to the ball to preserve this lead but instead let loose an errant pass, which was intercepted and the England full international winger, Keith Fielding, was able to run in the long try. The England side was a strong one, with all players to be full internationals. Loughborough Colleges' Fran Cotton was the captain and in the final both Keith Fielding and Andy Ripley scored. Mike Gibson, of Ireland, was selected the tournament's outstanding player.

== Status of tournament ==
The tournament was held twenty years before the first official world cup, yet in a number of quarters was referred to as a world championship. The SRU itself did not advertise it as a world cup but rather it was styled "The International Seven-a-side tournament". Additionally, it was not officially endorsed by the International Rugby Football Board as anything other than an international tournament. However, elements of the press referred to it variously as bestowing the World Sevens Crown or conferring the status of world sevens' champions or World Seven-a-side Champions, and even modern press reports, in the era of the fully sanctioned World Cup, have referred to the competition in comparable terms to modern World Cups.

== See also ==
- Rugby World Cup Sevens
