= Sam Strahan =

New Zealand rugby union player (1944–2019)

- Born: Samuel Cuningham Strahan; 25 December 1944 Palmerston North, New Zealand
- Died: 21 December 2019 (aged 74) Kiwitea, New Zealand
- Height: 1.94 m (6 ft 4 in)
- Weight: 101 kg (223 lb)
- School: Apiti School, Huntley School; Wanganui Collegiate School

Rugby union career
- Position: Lock
Provincial / State sides
Years	Team	Apps	(Points)
1965–76	Manawatu		
International career
Years	Team	Apps	(Points)
1967–73	New Zealand	17	(0)

Samuel Cuningham Strahan (25 December 1944 – 21 December 2019) was a New Zealand rugby union player. He represented Manawatu at a provincial level and the New Zealand national team, the All Blacks. He was a lock and was said to be the best lineout jumper in the country.

== Rugby career ==
Strahan represented Manawatu at a provincial level for 12 seasons, and the All Blacks between 1967 and 1973. He played 45 matches for the All Blacks including 17 internationals.

He was selected by Fred Allen as a 22 year old to play for the All Blacks in the 1967 "NZRFU 75th Jubilee Test" against Australia at Athletic Park. Although he was Manawatu's 14th All Black he was only the second to be born locally, the first being Arthur Law. In that game his locking partner was Colin Meads who he would play many tests and other All Black matches with. Strahan played tests in the following tours:

- 1967 New Zealand rugby union tour of Britain, France and Canada (all 4 tests, locking with Meads)
- 1968 New Zealand rugby union tour of Australia and Fiji (both tests with Meads)
- 1968 France rugby union tour of New Zealand and Australia (all 3 tests with Meads)
- 1970 New Zealand rugby union tour of South Africa (the first 3 tests, locking with Alan Smith, Alan Sutherland and then Meads)
- 1972 Australian tour of New Zealand (all 3 tests, locking with Peter Whiting)
- 1973 England rugby union tour of Fiji and New Zealand (the sole test, locking with Hamish Macdonald)

== Later life ==
Strahan was made a life member of the Oroua rugby club in 2002.

He served as president of the Manawatu Rugby Union from 2003 to 2006. In 2009 he and fellow Manawatu All Blacks John Callesen, Mark Donaldson, Gary Knight and Frank Oliver advocated for the retention of the Turbos in the National Provincial Championship.

Strahan died at his home in Kiwitea, northeast of Feilding, on 21 December 2019.
