= Ray Gravell =

British Lions & Wales international rugby union footballer

- Gravell in action for the Lions in 1980
- Born: Raymond William Robert Gravell; 12 September 1951 Kidwelly, Wales
- Died: 31 October 2007 (aged 56) Calpe, Spain
- School: Burry Port Secondary Modern School; Carmarthen Grammar School

Rugby union career
- Position: Centre
Amateur team(s)
| Years | Team | Apps | (Points) |
| 1970–1985 | Llanelli RFC | 481 | (476) |
| 1975–1977 | Barbarians | 12 | |
International career
| Years | Team | Apps | (Points) |
| 1975–1982 | Wales | 23 | (4) |
| 1980 | British Lions | 4 | (4) |

Raymond William Robert Gravell (12 September 1951 – 31 October 2007) was a Welsh rugby union centre who played club rugby for Llanelli RFC. At international level, Gravell earned 23 caps for Wales and was selected for the 1980 British Lions tour to South Africa. Known across Wales and the rugby world as "Grav", Gravell was also an activist, actor, singer and respected broadcaster.

Gravell was a member of the Gorsedd y Beirdd (English: Gorsedd of the bards) under the Bardic name Ray o'r Mynydd, and was also the "Grand Sword Bearer" at the annual National Eisteddfod.

== Early life and education ==
Although born in Kidwelly and educated at Burry Port Secondary Modern School and Carmarthen Grammar School, Gravell lived his whole life in Mynydd-y-Garreg in the Gwendraeth Valley. His father, Jack had suffered a serious back injury working as a collier, which caused him both great physical pain and financial worries as he was unable to work. When Ray was 14 and playing in a trial match for West Wales, Jack took his own life with Ray discovering his body on a nearby mountain later the same day. The experience would stay with Gravell forever.

== Rugby career ==
The Llanelli RFC coach, Carwyn James personally oversaw the development of the Llanelli youth team that included Gravell and gave the teenager his first start for the club in 1970. In October 1972, James selected the 21 year old Gravell to start against the touring All Blacks, in what would become the famous Llanelli RFC 9–3 New Zealand victory. The young Gravell was particularly nervous before the match, with James instructing club captain, Delme Thomas to distract his youngest player with small talk all the way into Stradey Park. In the game Gravell's performance was notable as a display of tremendous defence, but also for an incident where the New Zealand player Keith Murdoch trampled Gravell towards the end of the match, leaving him with blurred vision and barely conscious. Gravell managed to get back to his feet to see out the last few minutes of the most famous victory in Llanelli's history. As an amateur player, Gravell worked as a linesman for the electricity board but was given £10 "beer money" to celebrate the New Zealand win, which he described as the first time he had ever held a £10 note in is life.

He made his first appearance for Wales against France in the first match of the 1975 Five Nations Championship. Again suffering with severe pre-match nerves, Gravell resolved to pack his bags and returned home in the middle of the night before the match, only to be persuaded to stay by his roommate, J. J. Williams. Gravell was still sick with nerves before the game, but would go on to play for Wales for the next seven seasons and win two Grand Slams.

Gravell was selected to play for the British and Irish Lions for their controversial 1980 tour of South Africa. The governments of both Britain and Ireland had disavowed the tour, in support of the Anti-Apartheid Movement against the South African regime. Gravel defended the tour, saying that "I still believe that keeping in contact and having a quiet influence can be effective." Gravell would feature in each of the four test matches, coming on as a substitute in the first test and starting the other three. In the second test at Bloemfontein, Gravell scored his second international try, though the tourists eventually lost the series 3-1. Gravell also played 12 games for the invitational touring team the Barbarians. First selected in 1975, Gravell faced an Australia XV at the start of 1976 before joining the Barbarian tour of Canada later that year where he played in six matches. In 1977 Gravell played his final match for the Barbarians in a star-studded team that faced the returning 1977 British Lions in a charity match to celebrate the Silver Jubilee of Elizabeth II. Although Gravell ended on the losing team, he scored one of three tries for the Barbarians in a game seen as a classic encounter.

Often epitomising the hard edge of rugby, Gravell thrived on physical contact. Gravell's reputation as a tough physical player was perhaps best summed up in an image drawn by the Welsh newspaper cartoonist Gren, who depicted a Wales rugby fan waving a banner bearing the slogan: “Gravell eats soft Centres.” He is also cited as the source for the much repeated rugby phrase, "get your first tackle in early, even if it's late." He announced his retirement from international rugby in 1982, but continued to play for Llanelli and was part of the squad that defeated the 1984 touring Australians. Gravell's retied from all rugby in 1985, having played 485 times and scored 120 tries for Llanelli. He would later become president of Llanelli RFC from 1998 and of the Llanelli Scarlets regional team from their formation in 2003 until his death.

== Broadcasting, acting and Gorsedd ==
In 1985, he joined the BBC taking the leading role in Bonner, a BBC Cymru film for the Welsh language broadcaster S4C. He appeared in the BBC TV movie Filipina Dreamgirls, and this led to a role in the 1992 Louis Malle film Damage as the chauffeur of the character played by Jeremy Irons. In the same year, 1992, Gravell appeared alongside Peter O'Toole in Rebecca's Daughters, a British comedy film directed by Karl Francis that was based on a story by Dylan Thomas. The film also starred Joely Richardson and Paul Rhys. He also played a gypsy in the 1996 Welsh cult horror film Darklands directed by Julian Richards and starring Craig Fairbrass and Jon Finch.

He presented regular chat and entertainment shows for both BBC Radio Wales and BBC Radio Cymru. Up until his death, he was a member of the BBC's Welsh language rugby commentary team, serving as the pitchside reporter for Celtic League, Powergen Cup and Heineken Cup matches. He hosted a breakfast radio show on Radio Cymru in West Wales and co-hosted I'll Show You Mine with Frank Hennessy on Radio Wales.

Ray Gravell was "rugby consultant" and appeared as "Referee No. 1" in the film Up 'n' Under. He appeared in the Wales episode of Floyd on Britain and Ireland (1988) where he joined Keith Floyd in the kitchen, commented on some career highlights, and translated ingredients into Welsh.

Gravell had a long interest in Welsh culture, language and literature and was involved with the National Eisteddfod from 1997 until his death. For his contribution to the language, Gravell was made a member of the Gorsedd y Beirdd under his Bardic name Ray o'r Mynydd and was given the ceremonial role of Grand Sword Bearer.

== Personal life ==
Gravell and his wife Mari lived in Mynydd-y-garreg, Carmarthenshire, with their two daughters, Manon and Gwenan, on a street named after him, Heol Ray Gravell (Ray Gravell Road). Gravel was a proud Welshman and Welsh Nationalist. During a Wales test match in Sydney, a member of the crowd shouted "Go home, you Pommy bastard" at Gravell. Gravell immediately ran over to the spectator and responded by saying "Call me a Welsh bastard, but never a Pommy bastard."

In 2000 he was diagnosed with diabetes and ill-health plagued his later years. On 18 April 2007, it was announced that he had been readmitted to hospital following an operation to amputate two toes as a result of a diabetes-related infection, and his right leg was amputated below the knee. Because of the operation, Gravell was unable to continue his bardic duties as the Grand Sword Bearer. The ceremonial role was passed on to fellow international rugby union player Robin McBryde. In the following months, Gravell continued public duties, including appearances on television and at the Urdd Gobaith Cymru.

== Death and funeral ==
Six months after the operation and 35 years to the day after Llanelli's famous win over the All Blacks, Gravell died of a heart attack, aged 56. He was taken ill on 31 October 2007 while on a family holiday in Spain, but did not recover and died late that night. After his death tributes were led by Welsh Rugby Union chief executive, Roger Lewis, who said "We are all in total shock because Ray was so full of life even through the difficult health problems he suffered recently. We will miss him as a rugby legend but more importantly, we will miss Ray as a great friend and a fine, family man." At the time of his death, Gravell was mentoring ex-Welsh Guardsman and war hero Simon Weston in the BBC Wales 'reality' TV show The Big Welsh Challenge, in which a team of five celebrities were tasked with mastering the Welsh language in just 12 months. Weston made the decision to pull out of the show as he felt unable to continue without his friend of 20 years.

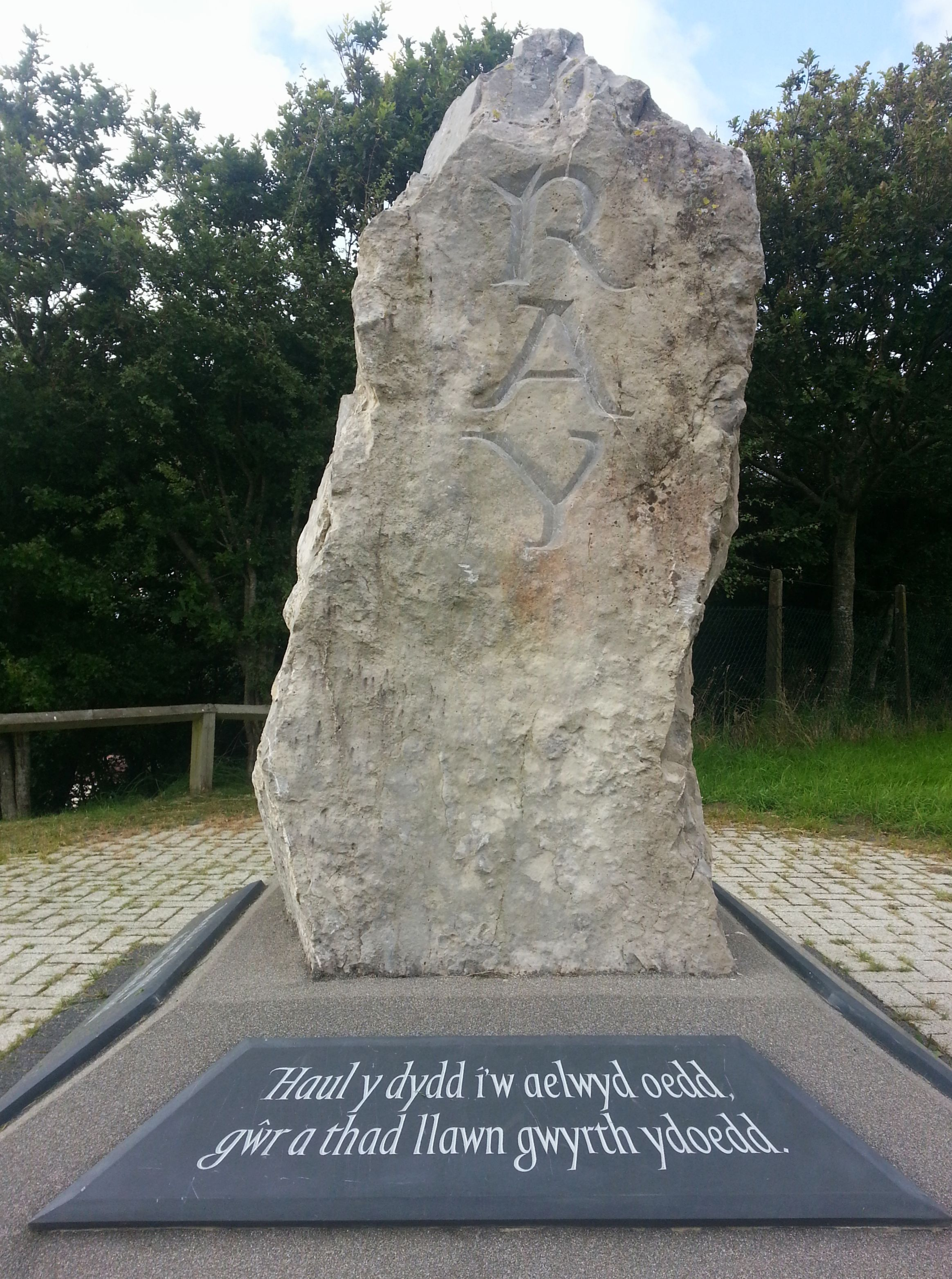
A memorial stone was erected in Gravell's home village of Mynydd-y-garreg shortly after his death.

Gravell's public funeral was held at Stradey Park on 15 November 2007, and has been described as "as close to a State funeral as can be delivered in Wales". Attended by up to ten thousand mourners, Gravell's coffin was draped in the Flag of Wales and carried onto the pitch by past and present Llanelli players with the scoreboard reading "Llanelli 9 Seland Newydd 3", as it did at the end of the match in 1972. For the first time in Welsh history the historic Gorsedd Sword that Gravell used to bear was permitted to leave its official setting to be carried in front of the procession. Speakers included First Minister for Wales, Rhodri Morgan and the Welsh historian Hywel Teifi Edwards who, comparing Gravell to characters in Welsh mythology, saying "Stories will be told about him with gusto in years to come by people who never met him, and I'm quite convinced that stories were fashioned with Grav in mind centuries ago." The Welsh folk singer, Dafydd Iwan sang his own song "Duw, Mi Wn y Daw" (English: "My God, I Know You Will Come"). At the close of the ceremony, a guard of honour was given by both the current Llanelli Scarlets squad and the remaining members of Gravell's own team that beat the All Blacks. The service was followed by a private ceremony for Gravell's family and close friends at Llanelli Crematorium.

On 15 March 2008 at the final match of the Six Nations Championship, Gravell's daughters Gwenan and Manon were asked to lead the Wales team on to the pitch at the Millennium Stadium in Cardiff, carrying the Triple Crown plate Wales had won in their previous match. During the game itself, Wales' kicking coach, Neil Jenkins along with other members of the coaching staff and players wore number 13 shirts bearing Gravell's name. Wales won the match 29–12 securing their 10th Grand Slam, just Wales' second since Gravell himself had won it in 1978.

| Preceded by Derek Quinnell | Llanelli RFC captain 1980–1982 | Succeeded by Phil May |
