= Urlich =

Urlich is a surname. Notable people with the surname include:

- Colleen Waata Urlich (1939–2015), New Zealand ceramicist
- Margaret Urlich (1965–2022), New Zealand singer
- Peter Urlich (born 1956), New Zealand musician
- Ron Urlich (born 1944), New Zealand rugby union player

== See also ==
- Ulrich
