= Lindsay Clark =

NZ international rugby union player

- Born: Lindsay Allan Clark; 1 May 1944 (age 82) Dunedin, New Zealand
- Height: 1.83 m (6 ft 0 in)
- Weight: 98 kg (216 lb)
- School: King's High School

Rugby union career
- Position: Prop
Provincial / State sides
Years	Team	Apps	(Points)
1965–78	Otago	143	
International career
Years	Team	Apps	(Points)
1972–73	New Zealand	0	(0)

Lindsay Allan Clark (born 1 May 1944) is a former New Zealand rugby union player. A prop, Clark represented Otago at a provincial level, and was called into the New Zealand national side, the All Blacks, as a replacement for Keith Murdoch on the 1972–73 tour of Britain, Ireland, France and North America. He played seven matches on that tour, but did not appear in any internationals.
