= Angel Hotel, Cardiff =

Hotel in Cardiff, Wales

Coordinates: 51.4808°N 3.183°W

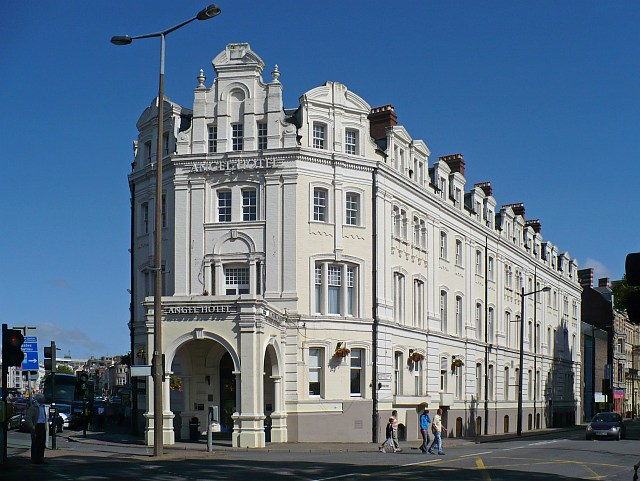
The Angel Hotel, Cardiff

The Angel Hotel is a hotel on a prominent corner of Castle Street and Westgate Street in the centre of Cardiff, Wales. Tracing its history back to at least the 18th century, for much of its existence it has been one of the major hotels in Cardiff, visited by celebrities and prime ministers.

== History ==
It is claimed the Angel Hotel existed in Cardiff since 1666 but certainly from the 18th century when it was located opposite the gates of Cardiff Castle, a short distance from its current location, on what was then called Angel Street. From around 1782 it was run by John Bradley, from a family who made their money from horse racing. Bradley was also postmaster and mail contractor for Cardiff. The Angel Hotel was the destination for the daily mail coach from London and Bristol.

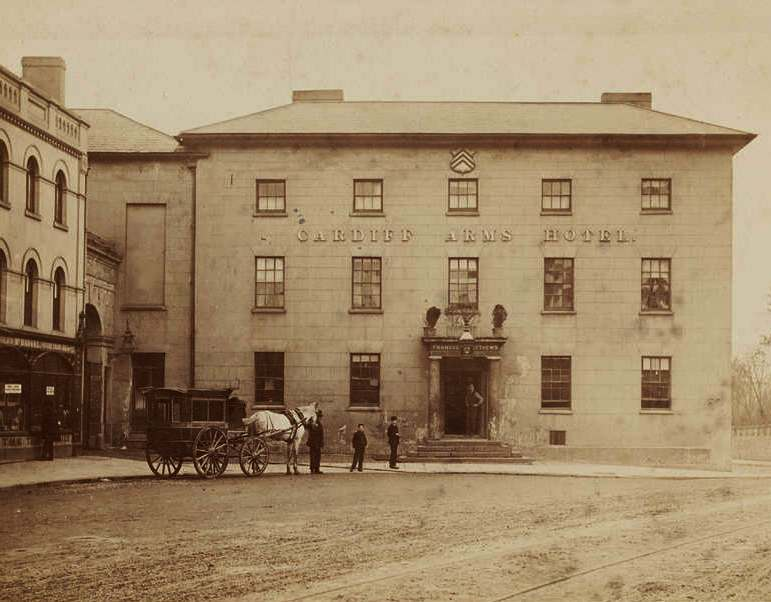
Cardiff Arms Hotel

A century later the road in front of Cardiff Castle needed widening. A new hotel was built at the end of the street to replace the Angel Hotel and the old Cardiff Arms Hotel (which had been demolished). The plot was purchased by the Cardiff Corporation from the Marquess of Bute for a nominal sum and the new hotel, "designed by Mr C. J. Jackson" in an 'English Renaissance' style, was built by Jackson's company entirely from red bricks made by the Bute Estate Brickworks at a total cost of over £20,000. It was fully decorated, furnished and ready for guests by July 1883. The new hotel logo, used for the hotel signs and crockery, was designed by the Marquess of Bute, referring to the two previous hotels by combining an angel holding the Cardiff coat of arms.

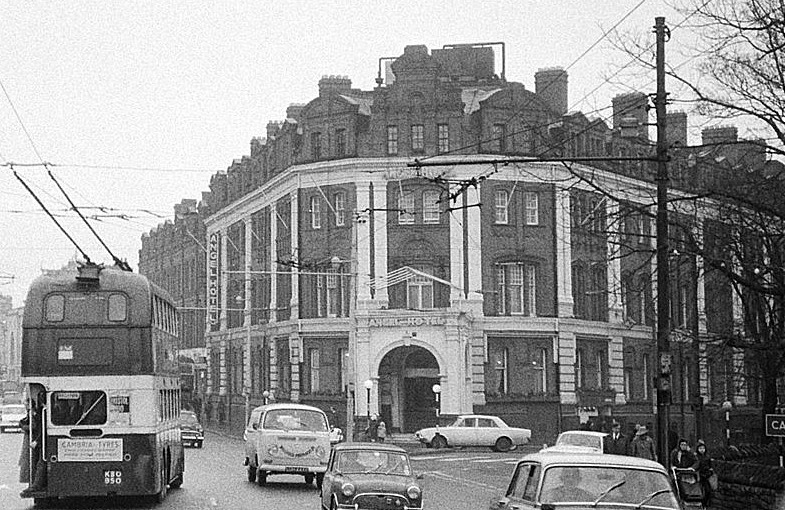
The Angel Hotel in 1970

The new building located its large portico entrance at the prominent corner of the site. The hotel had 76 bedrooms, bars, a billiard room and a full height hexagonal hall filling the interior with daylight via a glass lantern rooflight. Its principal space, the grand coffee room on the first floor commanded splendid views of the surrounding countryside "that very few even of the residents of Cardiff can have any idea that a building in the coal Metropolis of Wales commands a prospect of such varied beauty". It led onto a balcony above the portico intended to be used by the local Member of Parliament to "address his constituents when he has to return thanks for being elected".

The old Angel Hotel was converted into offices for the Bute Estate. In the 1930s the 18th century facade of this building collapsed while repairs were being carried out. It was reconstructed and, despite being a replica, became Grade II listed in 1975.

In 1917, during the First World War, the hotel was requisitioned on behalf the US Navy and was officially renamed USS Chattanooga.

At the turn of the 20th century the Angel Hotel was owned by Lady Honywood's Honywood Hotels and leased by hotel entrepreneur Elizabeth Miles, who built a new facade for the building.

The new Angel Hotel remained an important place to stay for politicians and celebrities, including Greta Garbo, The Beatles and actor Anthony Perkins (who was arrested at the hotel in 1989 after a package of cannabis he had posted to himself was inadvertently given to another guest).

=== Sporting connections ===
Glamorgan County Cricket Club was founded at a meeting in the hotel in 1888. Until 1967 the club played home matches at Cardiff Arms Park, near the hotel.

The hotel is close to the rugby union grounds at Cardiff Arms Park and the Millennium Stadium, and was popular with visiting teams. In 1972 there was an incident following a match between the touring New Zealand All Blacks and Wales in which New Zealander Keith Murdoch punched a hotel security guard in a fracas. Murdoch was sent home from the tour, reportedly after pressure from the British press and rugby authorities.

== 21st century ==
The Angel Hotel was eventually superseded in importance in the 1990s and 2000s as modern hotels were built in the city centre and Cardiff Bay. It underwent refurbishment in 2000.

In 2012 Jo McElveen became General Manager of the Angel Hotel, after starting work as a waitress at the hotel 14 years beforehand.

The hotel is currently part of The Cairn Collection (previously Puma Hotels Collection/Barcelo Hotels/The Hotel Collection). It has 102 bedrooms.
