= Billy Fulton =

New Zealand rugby union player (born 1977)

- Full name: Andrew James Fulton
- Born: 22 April 1977 (age 49) Auckland, New Zealand
- Height: 5 ft 9 in (175 cm)
- Weight: 190 lb (86 kg)

Rugby union career
- Position: Half-back
Senior career
Years	Team	Apps	(Points)
2003–04	Harlequins		
2004–05	Northampton Saints		
2005–06	Bath		
2006–07	SU Agen		
2007–08	Harlequins		
Provincial / State sides
Years	Team	Apps	(Points)
1997–99	North Harbour	17	(0)
2000–01	Canterbury	12	(15)
2002–04	North Harbour	14	(0)
Super Rugby
Years	Team	Apps	(Points)
2000	Crusaders	1	(0)
2001–02	Highlanders	12	(0)
2004	Blues	4	(5)

Andrew James "Billy" Fulton (born 22 April 1977) is a New Zealand former professional rugby union player.

== Biography ==
Fulton was born in Auckland and attended Westlake Boys High School.

=== Rugby career ===
A half-back, Fulton got called up by the Crusaders for the 2000 Super 12 finals as back up for Ben Hurst following a series of injuries, debuting in the final minutes of their semi-final triumph over the Highlanders, then sitting on the bench for the grand final win over the Brumbies. He also played in the Super 12 with the Highlanders and Blues.

Fulton was a member of the NZ Maori side that won the 2004 Churchill Cup.

An Irish passport holder, Fulton continued his career in Europe after finishing up in the Super 12, appearing for Harlequins, Northampton Saints, Bath and SU Agen.
