= Ben Hurst =

NZ rugby union player

- Hurst in 2004
- Born: Benjamin Culmer Hurst Oamaru, New Zealand
- University: Lincoln University
- Notable relative: Ian Hurst

Rugby union career
- Position: Halfback
Amateur team(s)
Years	Team	Apps	(Points)
–	Sydenham		
Senior career
Years	Team	Apps	(Points)
2000-2003	Crusaders	18	(15)
2004	Highlanders	8	(5)
Provincial / State sides
Years	Team	Apps	(Points)
1999-2004	Canterbury	46	(20)

Benjamin Culmer Hurst is a former New Zealand rugby union player who played as a half-back. Hurst played for the Crusaders and the Highlanders winning two Super Rugby titles.

Hurst is the son of former All Black Ian Hurst. He has a Bachelor of Science from Lincoln University.

== Senior career ==
Hurst debuted for Canterbury in 1999 and was selected for the New Zealand Colts playing four games, scoring 1 try.

He would go on to debut for the Crusaders on 20 May 2000 against southern rivals the Highlanders.

Hurst was the starting halfback for the Crusaders in the tightly contested 2000 Super 12 Final with the Crusaders prevailing 20–19 against the Brumbies. Playing for the Crusaders Hurst was part of the legendary 2002 Crusaders team which played the entire season undefeated. This culminated in a second Finals appearance against the Brumbies with the Crusaders running out 31–13 victors. In his third Finals appearance he was the replacement halfback for the Crusaders in the 2003 final loss to the Blues.

Hurst was selected as Canterbury captain for the 2003 NPC.

He was not selected for the Crusaders in 2003 signaling the end of his Crusaders Super rugby career. He would go on to play the following season with the Highlanders in Super Rugby and Canterbury in the NPC.

== Post career ==
Following his rugby career Hurst has been well known for his business activities including early childhood education centres and investment business with former teammate Daniel Carter.
