= Phil Bennett =

British Lions & Wales international rugby union player (1948–2022)

Phil Bennett OBE
- Born: Philip Bennett; 24 October 1948 Felinfoel, Carmarthenshire, Wales
- Died: 12 June 2022 (aged 73) Felinfoel, Carmarthenshire, Wales
- Height: 170 cm (5 ft 7 in)
- Weight: 72 kg (11 st 5 lb)

Rugby union career
- Position: Fly-half
Amateur team(s)
Years	Team	Apps	(Points)
- Felinfoel RFC
1966–1981	Llanelli RFC	414	(2,535)
1970–1980	Barbarians	20	(181)
International career
Years	Team	Apps	(Points)
1969–1978	Wales	29	(166)
1974,1977	British Lions	8	(44)

Philip Bennett OBE (24 October 1948 – 12 June 2022) was a Welsh rugby union player who played as a fly-half for Llanelli RFC and the Wales national team. He began his career in 1966, and a year later he had taken over from Barry John as Llanelli's first-choice fly-half. He made 414 appearances for the Scarlets over the course of a 15-year career he scored 131 tries, 43 drop goals, 293 pens and 523 conversions. He made his Wales debut in 1969, but it was not until John's retirement from rugby in 1972 that Bennett became a regular starter for his country. He led Wales to the Five Nations Championship title, including the Grand Slam in 1978, which culminated with his retirement from Wales duty.

Bennett also toured with the British Lions to South Africa in 1974, when they went unbeaten in 22 matches, and to New Zealand in 1977, and also made 20 appearances for the Barbarians between 1970 and 1980; he played a pivotal role in the win over New Zealand in 1973, considered by many to be the best rugby union match ever played.

Bennett was inducted into the World Rugby Hall of Fame in 2015. In 2020, his try for Wales against Scotland in March 1977 was voted the greatest Wales try of all time.

== Early life ==
Bennett was born in Felinfoel, Carmarthenshire, on 24 October 1948. His father, Les, worked in a local steelworks in Llanelli until he had an industrial accident, and his mother, Mary, worked at a local car-pressing plant. Bennett was often ill as a child and his father was told that he would "never have the physique to play rugby". As a teenager, Bennett worked in the local steel works and was offered a trial by West Ham United as a footballer.

== Rugby career ==
=== Club career ===
Bennett began his rugby career with Felinfoel RFC, before being picked up by nearby Llanelli RFC. He made his debut for the Scarlets at the age of 18, starting at fly-half in an 18–9 defeat away to local rivals Swansea RFC on 12 November 1966. He made three more appearances in the 1966–67 season, all of them at full-back. Following the departure of Barry John to Cardiff RFC at the end of the season, Bennett took over as Llanelli's first-choice fly-half, and in his first full season, they won the Western Mail Welsh Club Championship. They won that title twice more during Bennett's time at the club, as well as reaching the final of the WRU Challenge Cup in each of its first five years, winning four in a row from 1973 to 1976. During the 1972–73 New Zealand rugby union tour of Britain, Bennett played in the Llanelli team that beat the New Zealand "All Blacks" 9–3. He retired from club rugby in 1981, having made 414 appearances for Llanelli and scored 2,535 points.

He also played 20 times for the Barbarians, including against the All Blacks in January 1973. Early in the match, after a long New Zealand kick downfield, Bennett gathered the ball inside his own 25-metre area; he then beat four All Black players before passing the ball onto J. P. R. Williams. The Barbarians broke downfield, the move culminating in a try for Bennett's half-back partner Gareth Edwards. The try is often considered to be the greatest ever scored.

=== International career ===
Bennett made his Wales debut against France at Stade Colombes in Paris on 22 March 1969; he came off the bench to replace an injured Gerald Davies, making him the first ever substitute for the Wales national team. Bennett's first start came on the right wing against South Africa in January 1970, a position he was not familiar with, but he was considered "too good to leave out"; he then moved to inside centre for Wales' first match of the 1970 Five Nations Championship against Scotland, before making his first appearance at fly-half in the match against France two months later. He had to wait almost two years for his next appearance, coming on as a replacement for an injured J. P. R. Williams at full-back, but after Barry John's sudden retirement from rugby in 1972, Bennett took the number 10 jersey on a permanent basis.

Bennett went on to become a member of the British and Irish Lions team on their tour to South Africa in 1974, in the team known as "The Invincibles". They went on to win 21 of their 22 matches and the Test series 3–0, with just one game drawn. Bennett scored 103 points, the most of anyone on the tour. He went on to tour again with the British and Irish Lions to New Zealand in 1977, but this time as captain, where he again was top scorer with 125 points. Bennett retired from international rugby union in 1978 having won 29 caps for Wales between 1969 and 1978. This included two Five Nations Championship Grand Slams and three Triple Crowns. He was awarded an OBE in the 1978 New Year Honours for services to rugby football.

As captain of Wales, Bennett gave a pre-game team talk before a Five Nations Championship match against England on 5 March 1977:

"Look what these bastards have done to Wales. They've taken our coal, our water, our steel. They buy our homes and live in them for a fortnight every year. What have they given us? Absolutely nothing. We've been exploited, raped, controlled and punished by the English – and that's who you are playing this afternoon,"

== Post-retirement ==
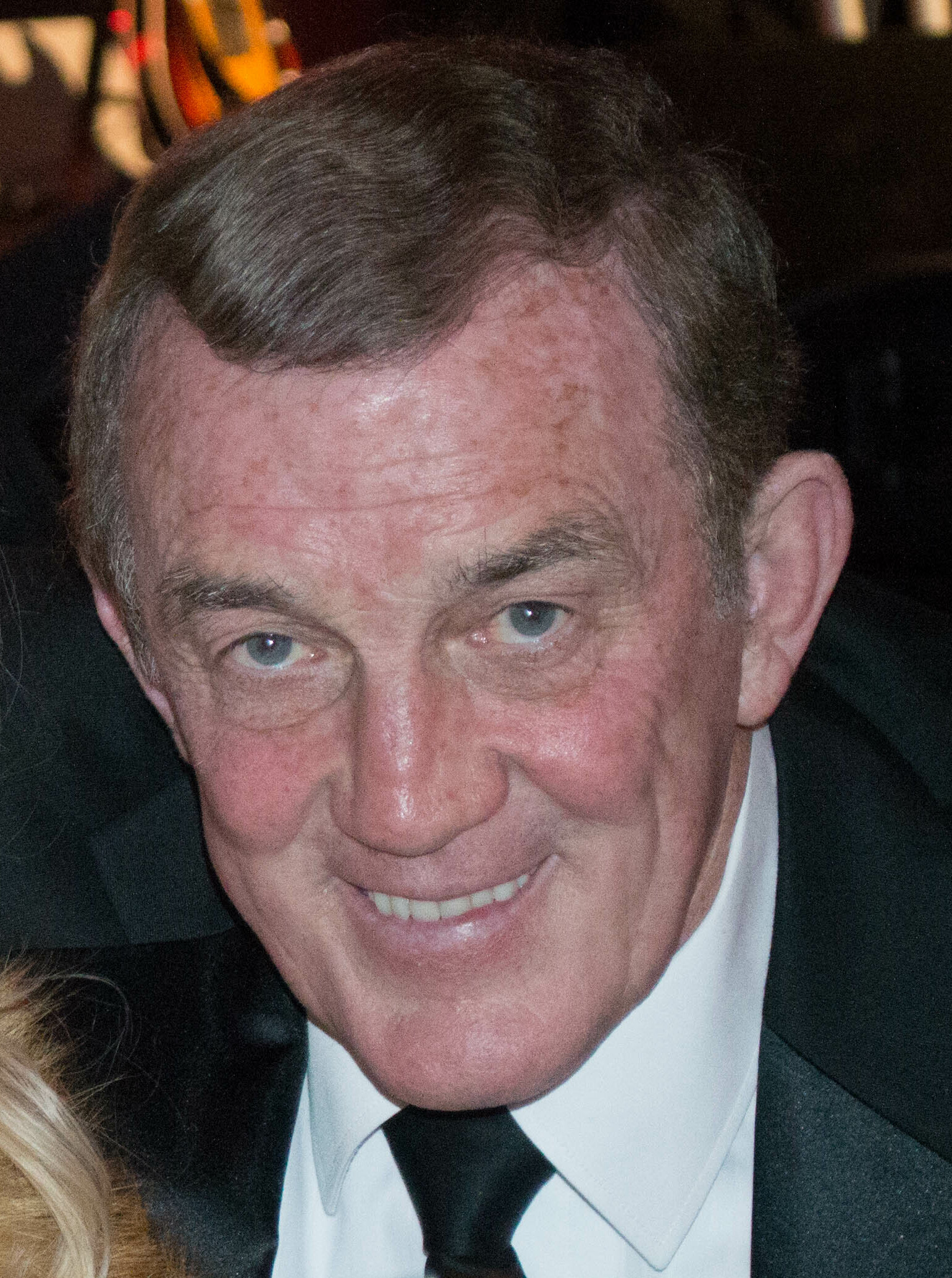
Bennett in 2014

After retiring, Bennett became a commentator for BBC Wales on their radio and television rugby coverage. He also had regular newspaper columns for the South Wales Evening Post and Daily Mirror. Bennett published his autobiography in 2004. In 2007, he was inducted into the Welsh Sports Hall of Fame. He was named president of the Scarlets regional side in 2011. In 2015, he was inducted into the World Rugby Hall of Fame (listed at the website of the Hall of Fame as inducted in 2014). In April 2022, a statue of Bennett by local wood carver Simon Hedger was unveiled in Bennett's home village of Felinfoel.

== Death and honours ==
Bennett died from throat cancer at his home in Felinfoel, on 12 June 2022, aged 73. The Guardian said that Bennett was "one of the greatest fly-halves to play for Wales and the British and Irish Lions. World Rugby, the world governing body for rugby union, said of Bennett that he was "one of the greatest to have ever played the game. Phil Bennett's legacy and his impact are undeniable." The Welsh Rugby Union said he was "a Welsh rugby legend in every sense and true gentleman".

On 19 June 2022, ahead of their match against England, the Barbarians players stood in the shape of a number 10 in honour of Bennett, and a minute's applause was observed in the stadium. Barbarians fly-half Antoine Hastoy wore his name on the back of his shirt in red rather than grey.

On 12 June 2023, the Scarlets announced that they would face the Barbarians in a pre-season friendly, with the match being marked as the Phil Bennett Memorial Game. A donation made up of the ticket revenue of the game would be given to the Phil Bennett Foundation, a charity founded in memory of Bennett to help raise charitable funds to help disadvantaged, disabled or underprivileged individuals to participate in sport. The match was played on the 16 September 2023 and the Scarlets won the game 33–19.

== Bibliography ==
- Smith, David; Williams, Gareth (1980). Fields of Praise: The Official History of The Welsh Rugby Union. Cardiff: University of Wales Press. ISBN 0-7083-0766-3.
- Bennett, Phil (2015). Phil Bennett: The Autobiography. HarperCollins Publishers. ISBN 978-0-00-816121-7.
