= Jeff Matheson =

New Zealand rugby union player (born 1948)

- Born: Jeffrey David Matheson; 30 March 1948 (age 78) Palmerston, New Zealand
- Height: 1.81 m (5 ft 11 in)
- Weight: 99 kg (218 lb)
- School: Waitaki Boys' High School

Rugby union career
- Position: Prop
Provincial / State sides
Years	Team	Apps	(Points)
1970–72	Otago	32	
1974–75	North Otago	22	
International career
Years	Team	Apps	(Points)
1972	New Zealand	5	(0)
Coaching career
- Years: Team
- 1977–80: North Otago

Jeffrey David Matheson (born 30 March 1948) is a former New Zealand rugby union player and coach. A prop, Matheson represented Otago and North Otago at a provincial level, and was a member of the New Zealand national side, the All Blacks, in 1972. He played 13 matches for the All Blacks including five internationals. He later coached North Otago between 1977 and 1980 and was a technical advisor to the Sri Lankan national team from 1990 to 1994.
