= Kerry Tanner =

- Born: Kerry John Tanner; 25 April 1945 (age 81) Hamilton, New Zealand
- Height: 1.88 m (6 ft 2 in)
- Weight: 101 kg (223 lb)
- School: Takapuna Grammar School
- Occupation: Publican

Rugby union career
- Position: Prop
Provincial / State sides
Years	Team	Apps	(Points)
1966–76	Canterbury		
International career
Years	Team	Apps	(Points)
1974–76	New Zealand	7	(0)

Kerry John Tanner (born 25 April 1945) is a former New Zealand rugby union player. A prop, Tanner represented Canterbury at a provincial level, and was a member of the New Zealand national side, the All Blacks, from 1974 to 1976. He played 27 matches for the All Blacks including seven internationals.
