= Sandy McNicol =

New Zealand rugby union player

- Born: Alasdair Lindsay Robert McNicol; 15 June 1944 Lower Hutt, New Zealand
- Died: 20 April 2017 (aged 72) Noosa, Queensland, Australia
- Height: 1.88 m (6 ft 2 in)
- Weight: 107 kg (236 lb)
- School: Whangarei Boys' High School

Rugby union career
- Position: Prop
Provincial / State sides
Years	Team	Apps	(Points)
1970–73	Wanganui	34	(12)
-	Stadoceste Tarbais		
International career
Years	Team	Apps	(Points)
1970–71 1973	Combined Services	6	
–	New Zealand		

Alasdair Lindsay Robert "Sandy" McNicol (15 June 1944 – 20 April 2017) was a New Zealand rugby union player. A prop, McNicol represented Wanganui at a provincial level, and was a member of the New Zealand national side, the All Blacks.

== Playing career ==
McNicol represented Wanganui at a provincial level, and played for the All Blacks in 1973, as a replacement on the 1972–73 tour of Britain, Ireland, France and North America. He played five games for the All Blacks during the latter part of that tour, but did not appear in any test matches. McNicol trained as a primary teacher at Palmerston North Teachers College. After his probationary year he joined the New Zealand Army as an education officer at Waiouru Military Camp. It was from there that he made his first class debut representing Wanganui.

In 1973 he informed the New Zealand Rugby Union that he would be unavailable for selection to play against the touring South African side, owing to his objecting to apartheid. This resulted in his receiving death threats.

He later moved to France and played for Stadoceste Tarbais, who were French champions in 1973. He spent three years in Tarbes.

== Later years ==
McNicol had dementia. He took his own life on 20 April 2017.
