= Mike Parkinson =

New Zealand rugby union player (1948–2009)

- Born: Ross Michael Parkinson; 30 May 1948 Wairoa, New Zealand
- Died: 17 January 2009 (aged 60) Matauri Bay, New Zealand
- Height: 1.82 m (6 ft 0 in)
- Weight: 82 kg (181 lb)
- School: Gisborne Boys' High School
- Notable relative: Johnny Smith (father-in-law)

Rugby union career
- Position: Midfield
Provincial / State sides
Years	Team	Apps	(Points)
1968, 1971–77	Poverty Bay	55	
International career
Years	Team	Apps	(Points)
1970, 1974	New Zealand Maori		
1972–73	New Zealand	7	(0)

Ross Michael Parkinson (30 May 1948 – 17 January 2009) was a New Zealand rugby union player. Playing as a midfield back, Parkinson represented Poverty Bay at domestic level, and was a member of the New Zealand national team, the All Blacks. He represented New Zealand in 20 international matches, seven of them at full test level, from 1972 to 1973. He also played for Auckland Maori, the North Island and a combined Poverty Bay-East Coast selection against the Lions in 1971. Parkinson died on 17 January 2009 while on holiday in Northland.
