= Ian Stevens (rugby union) =

- Born: Ian Neal Stevens; 13 April 1948 (age 78) Waipawa, New Zealand
- Height: 1.75 m (5 ft 9 in)
- Weight: 81 kg (179 lb)
- School: Palmerston North Boys' High School

Rugby union career
- Position(s): Halfback, first five-eighth
Provincial / State sides
Years	Team	Apps	(Points)
1967–76	Wellington		
International career
Years	Team	Apps	(Points)
1972–76	New Zealand	3	(4)

Ian Neal Stevens (born 13 April 1948) is a former New Zealand rugby union player. A halfback and first five-eighth, Stevens represented Wellington at a provincial level, and was a member of the New Zealand national side, the All Blacks, from 1972 to 1976. He played 33 games for the All Blacks, including one as captain, and appeared in three test matches.
