= Keith Murdoch (rugby union) =

New Zealand rugby union player (1943–2018)

- Born: 9 September 1943 Dunedin, New Zealand
- Died: 27 February 2018 (aged 74) Carnarvon, Western Australia
- Height: 1.83 m (6 ft 0 in)
- Weight: 110 kg (240 lb)
- School: King Edward Technical College

Rugby union career
- Position: Prop
Provincial / State sides
Years	Team	Apps	(Points)
1964, 1967–72	Otago	43	
1965	Hawke's Bay	6	
1966	Auckland	2	
International career
Years	Team	Apps	(Points)
1970–72	New Zealand	3	(4)

Keith Murdoch (9 September 1943 – 27 February 2018) was a New Zealand rugby union player.

== Biography ==
Murdoch, a prop, played for Otago from 1964 to 1972, except for one season each for Hawke's Bay (1965) and Auckland (1966). He represented New Zealand from 1970 to 1972, playing in 27 matches for the All Blacks, including three test matches. He toured with the All Blacks to South Africa on the 1970 tour and to Great Britain and Ireland on the 1972 tour, but was troubled by injury throughout both series. Murdoch had a history of unprovoked physical interactions with journalists. In 1971, he responded to a request from a New Zealand journalist for an interview by inviting him into the changing room, then holding the man under a shower until he was drenched. On the 1972 tour of Ireland and Britain, when another New Zealand journalist foiled a practical joke that Murdoch was playing, Murdoch dragged him to the floor by his scalp. Murdoch also allegedly threatened a cartoonist on the same tour.

== 1972 tour of Ireland and Britain ==
Murdoch's career ended controversially after he was sent home from New Zealand's tour. He scored the All Blacks' only try in their 1972 win against Wales in Cardiff, but later the same night was involved in a fracas in which he punched security guard Peter Grant at the Angel Hotel. He also played in famous Llanelli v New Zealand match in which the Scarlets spectacularly won 9–3. He was later sent home from the tour by All Black management, reputedly after pressure was brought to bear by the home rugby unions.

However, in 2019, Moyra Pearce, the daughter of Ernie Todd who was the manager of the 1972 tour, stated that Murdoch was not – as had always been alleged – sent home for assaulting a security guard. Instead, she claimed that Murdoch threatened and chased a female member of staff at the hotel who refused to open the bar for him. Welsh police told Todd that charges would be brought on the following Monday unless Murdoch was out of the country by then. To save Murdoch from prosecution, Todd concocted the story and sent Murdoch home. Bob Burgess, another New Zealand player on the tour, stated that he had never heard anything about a woman being involved, while team captain Ian Kirkpatrick stated that the claim was "news to me".

Although reporters waited in Auckland at the airport for his flight to arrive, he instead switched flights in Singapore on a stop-over, and flew to Perth, from where he headed into the Outback, quitting rugby forever. He was always invited to All Black rugby reunions, and a chair was always left empty for him should he turn up, although he never did. To this day, whenever the All Blacks visit Cardiff, they have an informal meeting nicknamed 'The Murdoch Memorial' at the Angel Hotel.

== Subsequent life ==
New Zealand Rugby tried hard to locate him but failed: in the 50 years after his disappearance, he was only traced by journalists four times. New Zealand rugby journalist Terry McLean traced him to an oil rig near Perth in 1974, but was ignored and dismissed by Murdoch. Murdoch lived for a year in New Zealand in the mid-1970s, working as a bushman in a job organised by former All Black teammate Graham Whiting.

In 1980, Murdoch was back in New Zealand, working on an Otago farm when he saved a 3-year-old child from drowning in a backyard swimming pool by providing mouth-to-mouth resuscitation. When the local newspaper heard and came to the farm to interview him, he was nowhere in sight, and subsequently moved back to Australia. Margot McRae, an ABC producer, located him in Tully, a remote town in Northern Australia. When she interviewed him, he explained that leading a nomadic life and always being on the move was exactly how he wanted to live. When McRae returned the next day with a camera crew, Murdoch ran away.

In 2001 Murdoch came to public attention in connection with an inquest into the death of an Aboriginal man, Christopher Kumanjai Limerick, who was found dead at an abandoned mine. The cause of death was not certain because of decomposition, but he seems to have fallen when attempting to reach water at the bottom of the mine. The coroner suspected that he may have been forcibly taken from the town of Tennant Creek and abandoned at the mine in the heat without food or water, saying that there was evidence of assault. The last time he was seen in the town was when trying to break into a house where Murdoch and others resided, and Murdoch had allegedly chased him away. Murdoch remarked after Limerick's disappearance that "I don't think he'll come back."

Initially, Murdoch could not be located, but was subsequently called in as a critical witness. Police eventually tracked him down to a remote cattle station hundreds of miles away, and he came to give evidence, refusing all questions from reporters. He was criticised by the coroner for the cavalier manner in which he gave his evidence, and the coroner alleged that he was lying in order to protect himself and any associates from being charged with a crime. No charges were laid due to lack of evidence.

Murdoch spent his last years living in the Western Australian town of Carnarvon, where he died on 27 February 2018.

He was posthumously awarded his rugby test cap. His local "drinking mates" did not know of his rugby past.

== Legacy ==
A play, Finding Murdoch by Margot McRae, which premiered in Wellington in 2007, is about McRae's tracking down of Murdoch. She says of the media frenzy when he punched a security guard that "If there's a baddie it would be the media". Some 1972 team-mates feel guilty about not supporting him.
