= Kent Lambert (rugby) =

NZ international rugby union & league player

- Born: Kent King Lambert; 23 March 1952 (age 74) Wairoa, New Zealand
- Height: 1.80 m (5 ft 11 in)
- Weight: 102 kg (225 lb)
- School: Te Aute College
- University: Massey University
- Occupation: Publican

Rugby union career
- Position: Prop
Provincial / State sides
Years	Team	Apps	(Points)
1971–77	Manawatu		
International career
Years	Team	Apps	(Points)
1972–73	New Zealand Māori		
1972–77	New Zealand	11	(0)
- Rugby league career

Playing information
- Position: Prop
Club
Years	Team	Pld	T	G	FG	P
1978–79	Penrith

Kent King Lambert (born 23 March 1952) is a New Zealand former rugby union and rugby league footballer.

== Rugby union career ==
A prop, Lambert represented Manawatu at provincial level. He was a member of the New Zealand national side, the All Blacks, from 1972 to 1977. He played 40 matches for the All Blacks including 11 internationals.

== Rugby league career ==
In December 1977, Lambert signed a three-year contract with the Penrith Rugby League Club in Sydney. However, injury curtailed his career and he retired in 1979.

Awards
Preceded by Bill Bush	Tom French Memorial; Māori rugby union player of the year 1976	Succeeded by Bill Osborne
