= Joe Karam =

New Zealand rugby union & league player and businessman

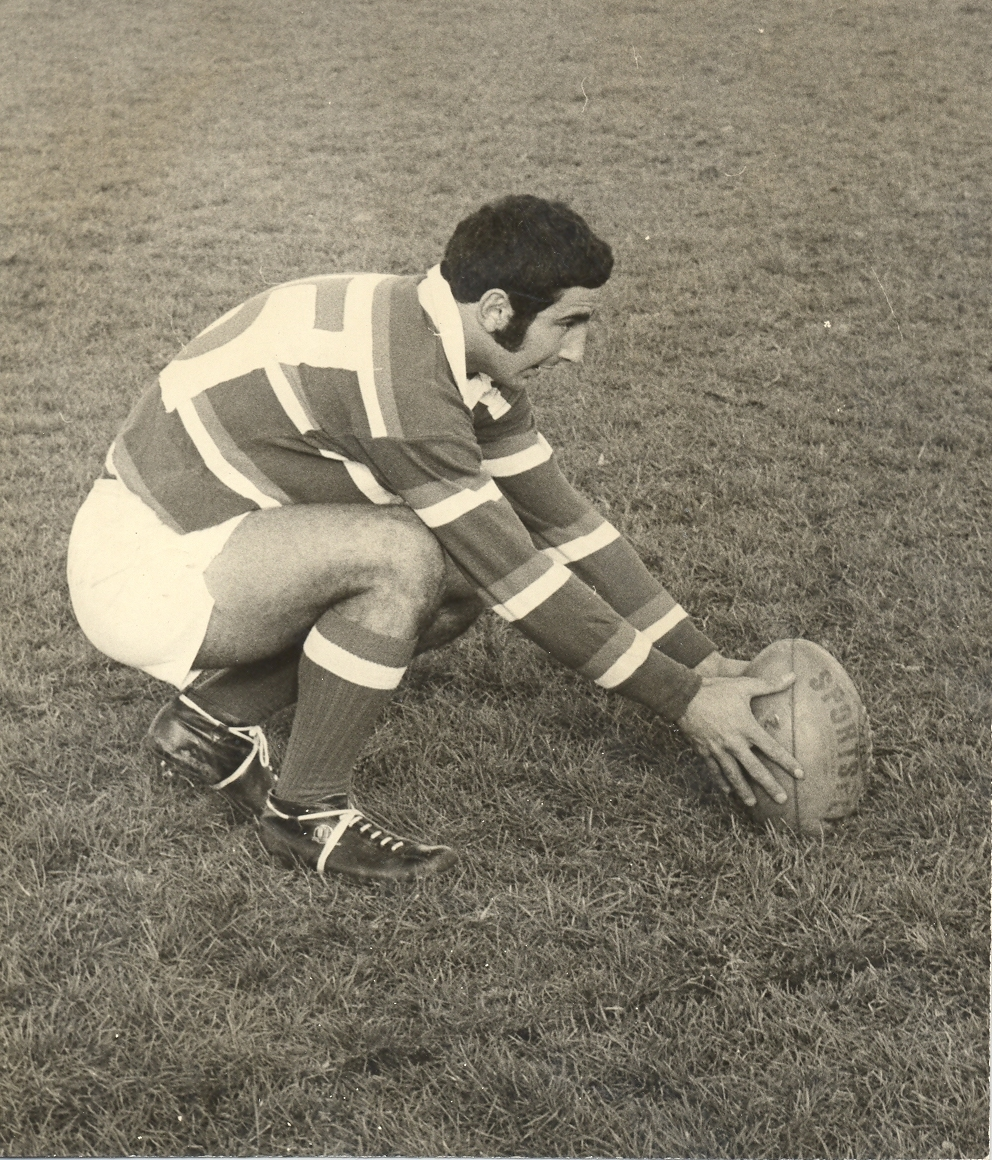
- Karam playing for Horowhenua in 1971

Personal information
- Full name: Joseph Francis Karam
- Born: 21 November 1951 (age 74) Taumarunui, New Zealand

Playing information
- Height: 1.73 m (5 ft 8 in)
- Weight: 82 kg (12 st 13 lb)

Rugby union
- Position: Fullback
Club
Years	Team	Pld	T	G	FG	P
1971	Horowhenua	10	1	20	1	60
1972–75	Wellington	41				370
	Total	51	1	20	1	430
Representative
Years	Team	Pld	T	G	FG	P
1972–75	New Zealand	10	1	24	0	65(tests only) 345 throughout All Blacks career

Rugby league
- Position: Fullback
Club
Years	Team	Pld	T	G	FG	P
1976–78	Glenora
Representative
Years	Team	Pld	T	G	FG	P
1976–77	Auckland	7				65

Joseph Francis Karam (born 21 November 1951), also known by the nickname of "Clock", is a New Zealand former representative rugby footballer who played for the All Blacks. After retiring from rugby, he became a businessman. However, he is most notable for waging a successful 15-year campaign to have David Bain's convictions for murder overturned, and a subsequent campaign seeking compensation for him.

== Background ==
Karam was born in Taumarunui to a Lebanese father and an Irish mother. He grew up on the family farm near Raurimu and attended St Patrick's College, Silverstream.

== Rugby union career ==
A first XV player at Saint Patrick's, Karam scored 138 of the schools 239 points during the 1967 season. That year he was a North Island secondary schoolboys representative.

He spent the 1971 season with Horowhenua. He was selected for Wellington's South Island tour in 1972, becoming the youngest-ever player picked to represent Wellington. An extremely hard trainer at a club level, Karam was named as an All Black for the 1972–73 tour of the British Isles and France. He played 10 test matches for the All Blacks between 1972 and 1975.

== Rugby league career ==
Karam switched codes in 1975, signing a three-year deal with the Glenora Bears in the Auckland Rugby League competition $20,000 a year. Karam was horrified that players on the UK tour of 1971 got a pound a day as their living allowance while rugby officials "were flying around the world drinking champagne like it was going out of fashion". For players of "modest employment" slogging it out on the field for their country it meant that "their wife and children were starving back home".

He scored 160 points for the Bears in 1976, winning the Painter Rosebowl Trophy as top point scorer. He won the trophy again in 1977. Karam was selected for Auckland almost immediately, playing in six games in 1976 and scoring 53 points. This including playing in Auckland's 17–7 victory over New South Wales City. He played in one game for Auckland in 1977, kicking six goals.

By the final year of his contract, Karam couldn't break into the Glenora side, being succeeded by Warwick Freeman. He reportedly found the tackling work rate to be far more demanding than in rugby union.

== Support for David Bain ==
Karam is known for his many years of support for David Bain, who was convicted in 1995 of murdering all five members of his family. Karam's research and sustained pressure on the justice system culminated in an appeal to the Judicial Committee of the Privy Council in the United Kingdom in May 2007, at which Bain's conviction was overturned. The Privy Council found there had been a substantial miscarriage of justice, quashed his convictions and ordered a retrial. After his convictions were quashed, Karam allowed Bain to stay at his house in the Waikato on bail prior to the retrial two years later. Bain stayed for about three months before moving to Auckland. The new trial was held in 2009 and Bain was found not guilty on all five charges.

Without Karam's support, it is unlikely there would ever have been a retrial. His interest in the case began in 1996, when he read a newspaper article about "an old music teacher and a bunch of young, long-haired university students" trying to raise money for Bain's appeal by selling jam. He went and gave them money. He began to study the evidence presented at the original trial and began to feel something was wrong with the case. He went to visit Bain in prison in Christchurch and subsequently visited him over 200 times.

Based on his extensive research over many years, Karam wrote four books about David Bain's case. The first was "David and Goliath: the Bain family murders" published in 1997. Karam made accusations against two police officers in David and Goliath as a result of which he was sued for defamation. (He won that case as well.) The book created a media furore. Karam appeared regularly on the Holmes TV show and 'did a thousand other media interviews'. The second book, "Bain and Beyond" was published in 2000 and the third, "Innocent!: seven critical flaws in the conviction of David Bain" came out in 2001. The fourth book "Trial By Ambush: The Prosecutions of David Bain" was released in 2012.

Karam was paid $424,480 by Legal Services for his legal work in support of David Bain. Commissioner Nigel Fyfe approved the payment describing Karam's "unique circumstances", and said his legal assistance to Bain's defence was "exceptional" and the "equivalent to a non-qualified legal executive..."

== Personal cost ==
Karam says the crusade cost him millions. He spent it in his pursuit of the case and ended up living in 15 to 20 different rental houses over the past decade while trying to prove Bain's innocence.

He received some compensation prior to the retrial by working as a researcher and investigator for Bain's legal team, where he was paid up to $95 an hour.

Karam acknowledges that fighting the case has taken its toll on him over the years. Interviewed in the New Zealand Herald in 2007 under the headline Joe Karam: Freedom Fighter, he said, "For many years, the mainstream media, judiciary, and politicians just thought of me as a raving redneck who'd lost the plot." He said that "every morning for two years, he would wake up, sink to the edge of the bed and cry". When asked what motivated him to keep going, he said it was because of his "innate hatred of unfairness and urge to help those less fortunate".

== Defamation cases ==
Karam also took legal action to defend himself in pursuit of the case. In addition to being sued for defamation by two police officers, Karam sued TVNZ, North and South magazine, and the New Zealand Herald. He sued journalist Rosemary McLeod over an article that cast doubt on his motives for supporting Bain. They settled out of court. In 2011 he sued Trade Me for defamation over 349 posts on the website's public message boards about Bain.

In 2012, Karam began legal proceedings against Kent Parker and Victor Purkiss for defamation. Parker and Purkiss were opposed to David Bain receiving compensation and made numerous derogatory comments about Karam on a number of websites. Parker admitted the defamation under cross-examination and was ordered to pay $350,500. Purkiss, who made defamatory posts on Facebook and the website Counterspin, was ordered to pay $184,500.

Karam was also awarded $64,774 in costs, and $11,350 disbursements. Journalist Jock Anderson said it was unlikely Karam would ever receive any of the money because Purkiss left the country and Parker was bankrupt. Karam also sued Fairfax NZ because articles on stuff drew attention to the defamatory remarks made by Parker and Purkiss, but Fairfax settled out of court.

== The Innocence Project ==
Karam believes that it took 13 years to get Bain's conviction overturned shows how flawed the New Zealand justice system is. In 2007 he said he planned to set up an organisation similar to the Innocence Project in the US, where those with skills and resources offer their help pro bono, like Keith Hunter and Mike Kalaugher (the Scott Watson campaigners).

An attempt to establish a New Zealand Innocence Project was made in 2009 by a group of lawyers concerned about the life sentence given to Alan Hall. In 2013, the project was re-launched out of the University of Otago, and has now been officially accepted as a branch of the Global Innocence network, becoming the world's 63rd innocence project.

Following the Privy Council decision to overturn the murder convictions of Mark Lundy, Karam said the Lundy case shows again that "an independent body is needed to review potential miscarriages of justice". Mark Lundy was convicted at his retrial in 2015.

== Publications ==
- Joe Karam: David and Goliath: the Bain family murders (Auckland: Reed, 1997) ISBN 0-7900-0564-6
- Joe Karam: Bain and Beyond (Auckland: Reed, 2000) ISBN 0-7900-0747-9
- Joe Karam: Innocent!: seven critical flaws in the wrongful conviction of David Bain (2001) (Auckland: Pohutakawa Productions, 2001) ISBN 0-473-07874-0
- Joe Karam: Trial By Ambush: The Prosecutions Of David Bain (HarperCollins) ISBN 9781869508340
