= Fergus Slattery =

Irish and Lions rugby union player (1949–2026)

- Born: John Fergus Slattery; 12 February 1949 Dún Laoghaire, Ireland
- Died: 3 June 2026 (aged 77)
- Height: 1.85 m (6 ft 1 in)
- Weight: 93 kg (14 st 9 lb; 205 lb)
- School: Blackrock College
- University: University College Dublin
- Occupation: Property consultant

Rugby union career
- Position: Flanker
Amateur team(s)
Years	Team	Apps	(Points)
- UCD
–	Blackrock College RFC		
International career
Years	Team	Apps	(Points)
1970–84	Ireland	61	(12)
1971–74	Lions	4	(0)
1970–84	Barbarians	18	(20)
- Correct as of 3 June 2026

John Fergus Slattery (12 February 1949 – 3 June 2026), nicknamed Slatts, was a rugby union player who represented Ireland. A "tearaway" open-side flanker, "one of the best of his generation", and blessed with blistering pace, he was inducted into the International Rugby Hall of Fame in 2007 and the World Rugby Hall of Fame in 2015.

== Rugby playing career ==
Born in Dun Laoghaire, near Dublin, Slattery played schools rugby for Blackrock College and then senior rugby for UCD. He then joined Blackrock College R.F.C.

=== Ireland ===
During his senior career Slattery earned 61 caps for Ireland, 18 as captain, and scored three tries. His call-up came in January 1970, an 8–8 draw against the Springboks at Lansdowne Road; his final appearance was against France in the 1984 Five Nations Championship, at which stage he was the game's most-capped flanker. Slattery was captain of the most successful Irish touring side ever in 1979 that won seven of the eight matches in Australia, including the two Test matches. In addition to the above honours, he was a member of the Irish team that won the 1974 Five Nations Championship and the Triple Crown in 1982.

=== British and Irish Lions ===
In 1971, while still a student, Slattery was a member of the British and Irish Lions squad that toured New Zealand, missing out on a start in the third test due to illness.

He toured with the Lions again in 1974, playing in all four Tests and captaining the side for two provincial matches. In the final minute of the fourth Test, Slattery appeared to have scored a try to win the match but it was controversially disallowed. Of that unbeaten "Invincibles" tour, Slattery recalled: "We were all so fortunate to have been around together at the same time. When you look at the quality of the players we had to choose from then it was superb. If you picked an all-time Lions XV you would probably find it dominated by the players of that era". After his death Lions Rugby called him "an integral part of one of the best British & Irish Lions back rows of all time".

=== Other ===
Slattery played for the Barbarians on 18 occasions, including scoring a try in the famous 1973 game against the All Blacks in Cardiff.

He continued to turn out for Blackrock College well into the 1980s, winning lower-league medals.

== Business career ==
Slattery worked as an estate agent and in commercial property.

== Personal life ==
Slattery and his wife Margot had a daughter Nikki, son Cameron and grandchildren.

== Health ==
Slattery was diagnosed with dementia in early 2018, at age 70.

He died on 3 June 2026, at the age of 77, after battling cancer and dementia.

== Honours ==
=== Ireland ===
- Five Nations Championship:
  - Winner (2): 1974, 1982
- Triple Crown:
  - Winner (1): 1982
