= Bruce Robertson (rugby union) =

New Zealand rugby union player (1952–2023)

- Born: Bruce John Robertson; 9 April 1952 Hastings, New Zealand
- Died: 12 May 2023 (aged 71)
- Height: 1.83 m (6 ft 0 in)
- Weight: 86 kg (190 lb)

Rugby union career
- Position: Centre
Provincial / State sides
Years	Team	Apps	(Points)
1971–1982	Counties	135	
International career
Years	Team	Apps	(Points)
1972–1981	New Zealand	34	(22)

Bruce John Robertson (9 April 1952 – 12 May 2023) was a New Zealand rugby union player. A centre, he represented Counties at a provincial level, and was a member of the New Zealand national team, the All Blacks, from 1972 to 1981. He played 102 matches for the All Blacks, including 34 internationals, and scored 30 tries, four of which were in test matches.

Robertson played 135 matches for Counties between 1971 and 1982, making his debut for the union at the age of 19. He was the All Black centre (No 13) for much of the 1970s, and was admired for his pace, silky pass and swerve, and his thinking approach to the game.

Robertson was regarded as one of the best centres in New Zealand rugby history. He played against all-white South African teams during the Apartheid era, in common with many All Blacks at the time. However, he declared himself unable to play against the Springboks during their New Zealand 1981 tour. This was due to his "personal abhorrence of apartheid", following the 1976 tour of South Africa.

Robertson died on 12 May 2023, at the age of 71.
