= Ian Hurst =

NZ international rugby union player

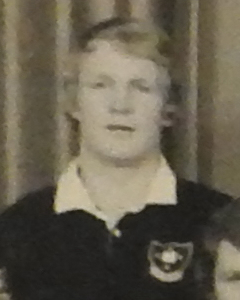
- Hurst in 1973
- Born: Ian Archibald Hurst; 27 August 1951 (age 75) Oamaru, New Zealand
- Height: 1.80 m (5 ft 11 in)
- Weight: 86 kg (13 st 8 lb)
- School: Papakaio Primary School Waitaki Boys' High School
- University: Lincoln College
- Notable relative(s): Ben Hurst (son), Sarah Hurst (daughter), Kate Hurst (daughter)
- Occupation(s): Farmer; Businessman

Rugby union career
- Position: Midfield
Provincial / State sides
Years	Team	Apps	(Points)
1970,75–76,78–80	North Otago	41	
1971–74	Canterbury	34	
International career
Years	Team	Apps	(Points)
1972–74	New Zealand	5	(8)

Ian Archibald Hurst (born 27 August 1951 in Oamaru) is a former New Zealand rugby union player who played for the All Blacks in the early 1970s. He also played provincial rugby for North Otago and Canterbury.

== Early career ==
In 1970 Hurst was picked to play for North Otago while he was attending Waitaki Boys' High School. The next year while attending Lincoln College he earned an appearance for Canterbury. Hurst was chosen for the New Zealand Universities in 1972, playing against the Californian Grizzlies, he then forced his way into the Canterbury A team midway through 1972 playing as a centre. In his sixth appearance he was involved in the team which lifted the Ranfurly Shield from Auckland, winning him a place in the trials for the All Black side to tour Britain. With a strong performance in the trial Hurst was selected to play against New York Metropolitan in the second match of the 1972/73, where he also scored his first all black try.

== Higher honours ==
Hurst played in 16 matches in the 1972/73 tour, including the test matches against Ireland and France. After another strong season for Canterbury Hurst was re-selected for the internal tour and the test match against England in 1973. Hurst scored a try against England to help the All Blacks to a 10–6 halftime lead, but England fought back and won 16–10. 1974 saw Hurst picked for the tour of Australia and Fiji, playing six matches and the first two test matches against Australia. Although picked for the 1974 tour of Ireland, Wales and England, Hurst's All Black career was coming to an end. He played in four of the eight matches on the tour and finished his career with a 13 all draw against the Barbarians.

== After internationals ==
After being dropped from the All Blacks in 1974 Hurst went back to play for North Otago. At the time North Otago was one of the country's weakest unions, but he was a good value for the province, playing for them until 1980. In 1979 he played so well he was given another All Black trial. Hurst has now moved from farming to become a successful businessman.

== Family ==
Hurst's son, Ben, also had a solid rugby career, playing for the New Zealand Colts, Canterbury, the Crusaders and the Highlanders.
