= Ian Kirkpatrick =

New Zealand rugby union player

Ian Kirkpatrick MBE
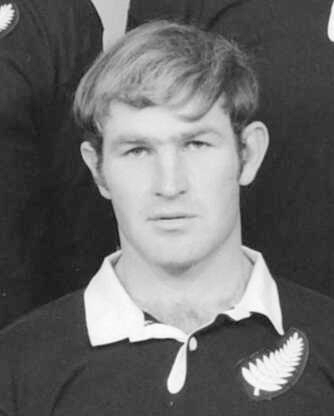
- Kirkpatrick in 1971
- Born: Ian Andrew Kirkpatrick; 24 May 1946 (age 80) Gisborne, New Zealand
- Height: 1.90 m (6 ft 3 in)
- Weight: 102 kg (225 lb; 16 st 1 lb)
- School: King's College
- Occupation: Farmer

Rugby union career
- Position: Flanker
Provincial / State sides
Years	Team	Apps	(Points)
1966, 1970–1979	Poverty Bay	82	
1967–1969	Canterbury	33	
International career
Years	Team	Apps	(Points)
1967–1977	New Zealand	39	(57)

Ian Andrew Kirkpatrick MBE (born 24 May 1946) is a New Zealand former rugby union player. Described as "supremely athletic, fast, fearless and with an uncanny sense of anticipation", Kirkpatrick is widely regarded as one of the greatest flankers to have ever played the game. His try-scoring ability was astonishing; at the time Kirkpatrick played rugby, it was rare for forwards to score tries, but his 16 test tries were an All Black record until Stu Wilson surpassed it in 1983. He also captained the All Blacks and was inducted into the World Rugby Hall of Fame in 2014.

== Early life, background and career ==
Kirkpatrick grew up in a farming community. He followed rugby from age 10.

Kirkpatrick attended King's College, Auckland where he was in the First XV from 1962 to 1964, helping the side win the 1A championship in 1963. He was first XV captain and head prefect in 1964. Additionally, he was the school boxing, sprint, hurdles and pole vault champion.

Kirkpatrick worked as a farmer.

== Rugby playing career ==
Kirkpatrick began his first-class career in 1966 at the age of 20 playing for Poverty Bay. One year later he moved to Christchurch and established himself in the Canterbury team. Later that year, he made his international debut for the All Blacks against France in Paris.

In the first test of the 1968 series in Australia in Sydney, a game equally remembered for Colin Meads' crude attempt to clear Wallaby scrumhalf Ken Catchpole from a ruck, resulting in a horrific injury to Catchpole, Kirkpatrick came on as a 22nd-minute replacement for the captain Brian Lochore, who had broken his thumb. He thus became the first All Black to be used as a substitute according to the new International Rugby Football Board regulations With his only warm-up being the run down the stairs from the reserve seats, Kirkpatrick scored a hat-trick of tries in a 27–11 victory.

Tours to South Africa were sometimes cancelled due to apartheid during this time. Kirkpatrick has said he was “never comfortable” with apartheid but adopted the position of many leading players at the time and that playing South Africa was the “ultimate challenge”.

In his career Kirkpatrick was one of the first names on the All Blacks team sheet, playing a then-record 38 consecutive tests for the All Blacks.

In 1971, he was a part of the President's Overseas XV that was chosen to play against England to celebrate the centenary of the Rugby Football Union, scoring two tries in the 28–11 win at Twickenham. Later in the 1971 Lions series, he would score one of his most famous tries, a 55-metre solo effort in the 22–12 victory in the Second Test in Christchurch.

Kirkpatrick was appointed All Black captain in 1972 and led the 1972-73 tour to Europe and North America, a tour memorable for the controversial expulsion of Keith Murdoch (which Kirkpatrick would call one of his biggest regrets) and the Barbarians' famous 23–11 victory at Cardiff Arms Park.

By the time he retired early in the 1979 season, Kirkpatrick had played a total of 289 first-class games and scored 115 tries. He is to date also the only man to have captained both islands: the South in 1969 in his last season with Canterbury and then the North (in 1972–73) when he had returned home to Poverty Bay. He also appeared in 33 Ranfurly Shield matches for Canterbury.

=== Physical conditioning ===
Kirkpatrick has said "Our general farm work, which varied a lot from shearing sheep to fencing, certainly kept you fit and kept your weight down. We would do a little bit of exercise above that in summer, but not much."

=== Recognition ===
In the 1980 Queen's Birthday Honours, Kirkpatrick was appointed a Member of the Order of the British Empire, for services to rugby.

In 2003, he was inducted into the International Rugby Hall of Fame.

In May 2020 he was named New Zealand Rugby's patron after the death of Sir Brian Lochore in 2019.

Kirkpatrick has been called 'one of the greatest blind-sides of all time.'

== Later life ==
From 2005 to 2010 Kirkpatrick served as a part-time mentor with the Hurricanes Super Rugby franchise.

== Opinions ==
In 2020, Kirkpatrick expressed his concerns for the physical wellbeing and welfare of modern rugby players.

In 2020 and 2022 he expressed additional concerns about the direction of rugby, including the gladiatorial nature of the game, the massive emphasis on defence, less open play, and the need to be physically big and strong. He expressed concerns that the physicality of the modern game was behind a major dropoff in playing numbers at schools level.

Sporting positions
Preceded by Colin Meads	All Blacks captain 1972–1973	Succeeded by Andy Leslie
