= Mark Sayers =

- Born: 1 May 1947 (age 79) Wellington, New Zealand
- Height: 1.83 m (6 ft 0 in)
- Weight: 71 kg (157 lb)
- School: Wellington College
- University: Victoria University of Wellington

Rugby union career
- Position: Second five-eighth
Provincial / State sides
Years	Team	Apps	(Points)
1968–75	Wellington	94	
International career
Years	Team	Apps	(Points)
1972–73	New Zealand	0	(0)

Mark Sayers (born 1 May 1947) is a former New Zealand rugby union player. A second five-eighth, Sayers represented Wellington at a provincial level, and was a member of the New Zealand national side, the All Blacks, from 1972 to 1973. He played 15 matches for the All Blacks but did not appear in any internationals.
