= Roy Bergiers =

British Lions & Wales international rugby union player (born 1950)

- Born: Roy Thomas Edmond Bergiers; 11 November 1950 (age 76) Carmarthen, Wales
- Height: 185 cm (6 ft 1 in)
- Weight: 86 kg (190 lb)
- School: Queen Elizabeth Grammar School Carmarthen

Rugby union career
- Position: Centre
Senior career
Years	Team	Apps	(Points)
1970–1981	Llanelli RFC	247	(318)
International career
Years	Team	Apps	(Points)
1972–1975	Wales	11	(8)
1974	British Lions	0	(0)

Roy Thomas Edmond Bergiers (born 11 November 1950) is a Welsh former rugby union player. Born in Carmarthen, he played his club rugby for Llanelli RFC. In October 1972, he scored the only try in Llanelli's famous 9–3 victory over the New Zealand national team in one of the biggest upsets in the history of rugby.

Bergiers played 11 tests for Wales and scored two tries. He made his debut against England at Twickenham on 15 January 1972. In 1974, he toured South Africa with the British Lions. His last test came against Ireland in Cardiff on 15 March 1975.
