= Bryan Williams (rugby union) =

NZ international rugby union player & coach

Sir Bryan Williams KNZM MBE
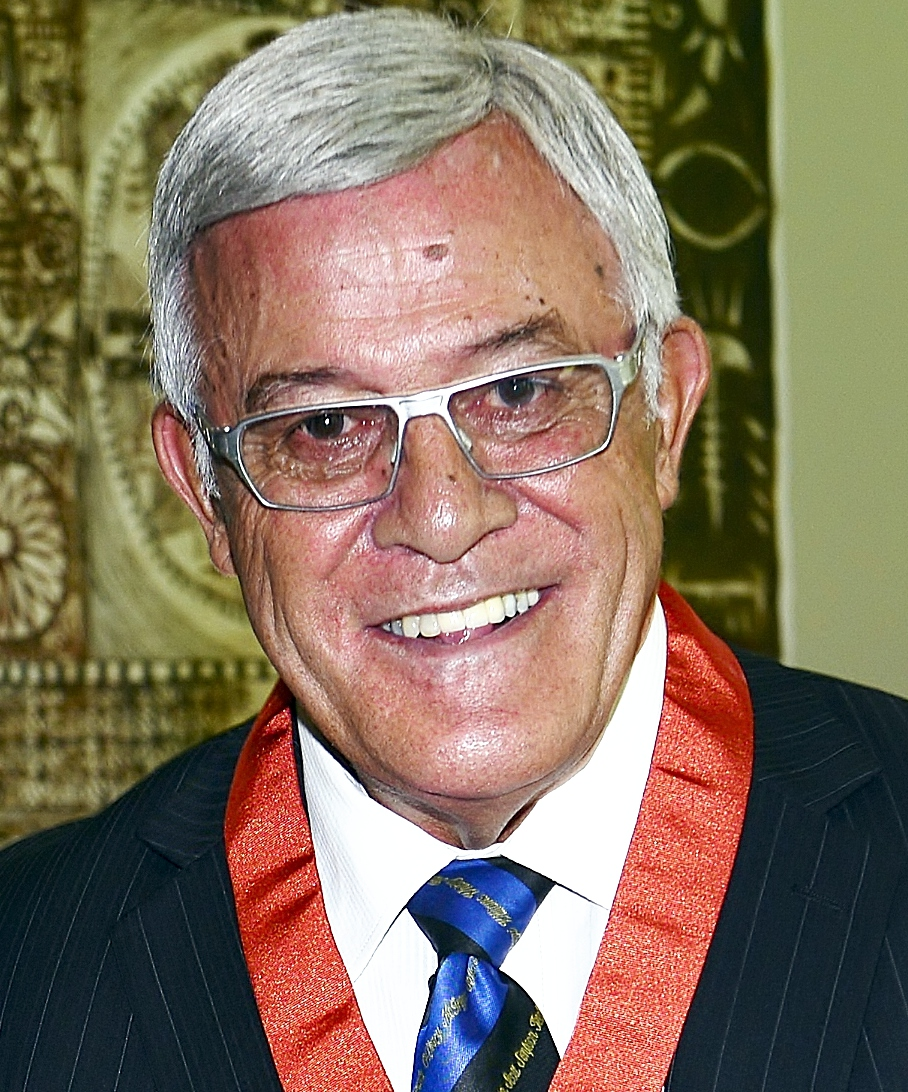
- Williams in 2018
- Born: Bryan George Williams; 3 October 1950 (age 76) Auckland, New Zealand
- Height: 1.79 m (5 ft 10 1/2 in)
- Weight: 89 kg (14 st 0 lb)
- School: Mount Albert Grammar School
- Notable relative(s): Gavin Williams (son); Paul Williams (son)

Rugby union career
- Position: Three-quarter
Amateur team(s)
Years	Team	Apps	(Points)
1968–1982	Ponsonby		
Provincial / State sides
Years	Team	Apps	(Points)
1969–1982	Auckland	132	
International career
Years	Team	Apps	(Points)
1970–1978	New Zealand	38	(68)
Coaching career
- Years: Team
- 1999: Samoa
- 2000–2001: Hurricanes (assistant coach)

Tuifaʻasisina Sir Bryan George Williams KNZM MBE (born 3 October 1950) is a former New Zealand rugby union footballer and former coach of the Samoan national rugby team.

== Playing career ==
Williams was born in Auckland, New Zealand, in 1950. His father was Samoan, and his mother a Rarotongan of Samoan descent. His family lived in Ponsonby, and he was educated at Mt Albert Grammar School, where he started his rugby career. He became an All Black in 1970 as a wing and distinguished himself in the 1970 South African Rugby Tour where he was a sensation, scoring 14 tries in his 13 appearances and in the international series he scored in each of the first and fourth Tests. This was during apartheid, so with his parentage he was only able to tour after honorary white status was granted.

Williams' international rugby career lasted from 1970 to 1978 in which he played 113 matches (including 38 international Tests) and scored 66 tries in all matches as an All Black (ten tries in Tests), which was a record until beaten by John Kirwan.

== Retirement ==
After he retired from rugby, he coached a number of club sides in New Zealand. During the 1990s onwards, he has been the national rugby coach for Samoa. He is married and has two sons Gavin and Paul, who also play rugby union: Gavin plays internationally for Samoa and plays club for French side US Dax; and his other son Paul played for the Auckland Super Rugby side the Blues before playing for Sale in the English Premiership and debuting for Samoa in 2010. Williams now coaches at the Ponsonby Rugby Club and the Mt Albert Grammar School Rugby Academy.

Williams was appointed President of the NZRU in 2011.

== Honours and awards ==
In the 1983 Queen's Birthday Honours, Williams was appointed a Member of the Order of the British Empire (MBE), for services to rugby. In the 2013 Queen's Birthday Honours, Williams was appointed a Companion of the New Zealand Order of Merit (CNZM), also for services to rugby. He was promoted to Knight Companion of the same order in the 2018 New Year Honours (KNZM), for services to rugby. In August of that year, he was announced as a member of the 2018 induction class of the World Rugby Hall of Fame, officially being inducted at the Hall of Fame's physical location in Rugby on 12 September. In 2024, Williams was an inaugural inductee into the Pasifika Rugby Hall of Fame.
