= J. P. R. Williams =

British Lions & Wales international rugby union player (1949–2024)

J. P. R. Williams MBE FRCS
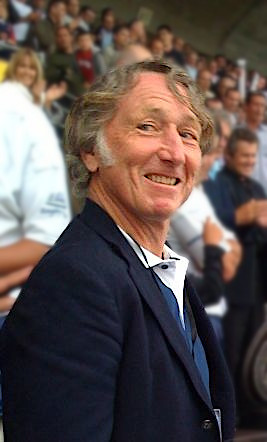
- Williams in 2009
- Born: John Peter Rhys Williams; 2 March 1949 Bridgend, Wales
- Died: 8 January 2024 (aged 74) Cardiff, Wales
- School: Bridgend Boys' Grammar School; Millfield School
- University: St Mary's Hospital Medical School
- Occupation: Orthopaedic surgeon

Rugby union career
- Position: Full-back
Amateur team(s)
Years	Team	Apps	(Points)
1967–1968	Bridgend		
1967–1968	St. Mary's Hospital		
1968–1976	London Welsh		
1969–1977	Barbarians		
1974	Natal		
1976–1990s	Bridgend		
1990s–2003	Tondu		
International career
Years	Team	Apps	(Points)
1969–1981	Wales	55	(36)
1971, 1974	British Lions	8	(3)

John Peter Rhys Williams MBE FRCS (2 March 1949 – 8 January 2024) was a Welsh rugby union player who represented Wales in international rugby during their Golden Era in the 1970s. He became known universally as J. P. R. Williams (or sometimes just as JPR) four years after his Welsh debut, in 1973 when J. J. Williams (also John) joined the Welsh team.

Playing in the position of full-back, he was noted for his aggressive attacking style. With his long sideburns and socks around his ankles, "JPR" was an iconic figure on the successful 1970s Wales team. However, despite playing full-back throughout his international career, his preferred position was flanker, where he played for Tondu at the end of his career.

Williams is one of a small group of Welsh players to have won three Grand Slams including Gerald Davies, Gareth Edwards, Ryan Jones, Adam Jones, Gethin Jenkins and Alun Wyn Jones.

An orthopaedic surgeon by profession, Williams continued to be involved in rugby following his retirement, serving as president of the Bridgend Ravens.

== Early life ==
Williams was born just outside Bridgend, Wales, and was educated at Bridgend Boys' Grammar School (now Brynteg Comprehensive School) and then Millfield School in Somerset, as was his Wales teammate Gareth Edwards.

As well as being a rugby union player, Williams was also a successful tennis player at youth level, before fully committing to rugby. He won the 1966 British Junior title at the All England Lawn Tennis and Croquet Club in Wimbledon, beating David Lloyd 6–4, 6–4; this is often erroneously cited as being a Junior Wimbledon victory, including in J.P.R.'s autobiography, when in fact it was won by Vladimir Korotkov. As an adult amateur, Williams participated in the first event of the tennis Open Era, the 1968 British Hard Court Championships in Bournemouth, but lost to Bob Howe in the first round. In an interview years later, Williams stated that "If I had to make the decision now, I might have opted for tennis," but admitted that his lack of a big serve would have hindered any chances of success.

== Rugby career ==
Williams' focus moved from tennis to rugby union, which was an amateur sport, in order to pursue a career in medicine. He quickly attracted attention and was consequently first capped by Wales in 1969, aged 19.

Williams went on to earn 55 caps for Wales, five as captain, and eight for the British Lions. Williams played club rugby for Bridgend, London Welsh and Tondu. He also played a few games for Natal shortly after the 1974 Lions tour.

Williams had many high points in his career, being a key player in a Welsh side that won Grand Slams in 1971, 1976 and 1978, and is particularly remembered for his record against England. In 10 tests between Wales and England he scored five tries – exceptional for a full-back – and was never on the losing side. He was also outstanding for the Lions, scoring an important long-range drop goal in the fourth test of the 1971 series against New Zealand. In the 1974 'invincible' series against South Africa he again played a major role.

Williams was involved in the build up of the famous 1973 Barbarians try against New Zealand, sometimes called the greatest try ever scored. Williams chose not to go on the 1977 British Lions tour to New Zealand, after being advised by his consultant to focus on his medical career.

Williams retired from international rugby union in 1981 and continued his career as an orthopaedic surgeon. He continued to play club rugby for many years, playing throughout the 1980s and 1990s for Bridgend and then for Tondu Thirds into his fifties. He finally retired in March 2003.

=== Playing style ===
At the times Williams played, the rugby rules restricted kicking to touch. This suited Williams as he did not naturally like kicking and would rather counter attack. For Wales this was helped by playing with very high-quality wingers, such as Gerald Davies and J. J. Williams.

=== Welsh international rugby honours and statistics ===
- First cap: 1 February 1969, Murrayfield, Scotland (Scotland 3 – Wales 17)
- His fifty-five caps comprised 37 wins, four draws and 14 defeats
- Member of three Grand Slam-winning teams: 1971, 1976, 1978.
- Member of six Triple Crown-winning teams: 1969, 1971, 1976, 1977, 1978, 1979
- Scored 36 points (five four-point tries and one three-point try; three penalty goals and two conversions)
- Captained Wales five times (1978–79 – Championship and Triple Crown Season)
- Final cap: 7 February 1981, Murrayfield, Scotland (Scotland 15 – Wales 6)

(Source)

=== Recognition ===
In 1977 Williams was appointed Member of the Order of the British Empire for services to rugby.

Williams was the subject of This Is Your Life in 1979 when he was surprised by Eamonn Andrews at Thames Television's Teddington Studios.

Williams was one of the inaugural inductees of the International Rugby Hall of Fame in 1997.

Sean Fitzpatrick and Ian McGeechan have said Williams was the best rugby full-back of all time.

== Medical career and other activities ==
Williams studied medicine at St Mary's Hospital Medical School, qualifying as a physician in 1973. He became a Fellow of the Royal College of Surgeons in 1980. In 1986 he was appointed a consultant in trauma and orthopaedic surgery at the Princess of Wales Hospital in Bridgend.

Williams represented several cricket teams, particularly the Lord's Taverners team, between 1976 and 2004.

In January 2006, in a party of 16 Welsh men and women, he climbed Mount Kilimanjaro in Tanzania for charity, helping to raise more than £200,000 for the NSPCC's 'Full Stop' Campaign.

== Personal life ==
Williams was married to Scilla and the couple had four children. They lived in the Vale of Glamorgan. Two of his children, Lauren Williams and Annie Williams both represented Wales at the 1998 Commonwealth Games in the field hockey tournament.

== Death ==
Williams died from bacterial meningitis, after a short illness, on 8 January 2024, at the age of 74 at the University Hospital of Wales in Cardiff.

== Views ==
Williams regarded Barry John as "Without doubt, the greatest player I played with."

In 2008 Williams said that if, when he was young, rugby and tennis had been in the conditions that they then were (in 2008) then he would have chosen to play tennis rather than rugby, because of the greater financial rewards of tennis and the increased physical dangers of rugby.
