= Ron Urlich =

- Born: Ronald Anthony Urlich; 8 February 1944 (age 82) Auckland, New Zealand
- Height: 1.83 m (6 ft 0 in)
- Weight: 89 kg (196 lb)
- School: Mount Albert Grammar School

Rugby union career
- Position: Hooker
Provincial / State sides
Years	Team	Apps	(Points)
1965–72	Auckland	30	
International career
Years	Team	Apps	(Points)
1970–73	New Zealand	2	(0)

Ronald Anthony Urlich (born 8 February 1944) is a former New Zealand rugby union player. A hooker, Urlich represented Auckland at a provincial level, and was a member of the New Zealand national side, the All Blacks, from 1970 to 1973. He played 35 matches for the All Blacks including two internationals.
