= Grant Batty =

New Zealand rugby union footballer (1951–2026)

- Born: Grant Bernard Batty; 31 August 1951 Greytown, New Zealand
- Died: 16 January 2026 (aged 74) New South Wales, Australia
- Height: 1.65 m (5 ft 5 in)
- Weight: 65 kg (143 lb)
- School: Kuranui College

Rugby union career
- Position: Wing
Provincial / State sides
Years	Team	Apps	(Points)
1970–1975	Wellington		
1976–1977	Bay of Plenty		
International career
Years	Team	Apps	(Points)
1972–1977	New Zealand	15	(16)

Grant Bernard Batty (31 August 1951 – 16 January 2026) was a New Zealand rugby union footballer. A diminutive but effective wing for the All Blacks, Batty played domestically for Wellington and Bay of Plenty. A crowd favourite, he was usually the smallest man on the field. Nicknamed "Batts", he was also known as "Twinkle Toes" or "Pocket Rocket" for his small size, explosive acceleration, and fearless combative approach. His rugby career was cut short by a knee injury, leading to his retirement in 1977 at age 25.

== Early life ==
Batty was born in Greytown on 31 August 1951, and educated at Kuranui College.

== Rugby career ==
In his career, Batty played 102 first class matches and scored 109 tries. He stated his three favourite tries out of the 45 he scored for New Zealand to be:

- his second try against the Barbarians at Cardiff on 27 January 1973. The All Blacks lost that game 11-23 but Batty said he had previously tried and failed twice to beat J. P. R. Williams so he tried a kick and won the chase.
- his second try against New South Wales on 18 May 1974 when the All Blacks won 20–0 at Sydney. His teammate Duncan Robertson pumped a high kick to the opposition's goal line which dropped into Batty's arms.
- his try against the British Lions at Athletic Park on 18 June 1977 won 16–12 by the All Blacks. Batty intercepted a pass thrown by Trefor Evans and despite a crippling knee injury ran over 50 metres to score the try chased by Graham Price and the fast gaining Andy Irvine. This was Batty's last test match.

Batty's biography, "Grant Batty", was written by Bob Howitt and published in 1977.

== Later life and death ==
After retiring, Batty won the New Zealand edition of the televised multi-sport competition Superstars for three years running from 1977 to 1979.

After a failed hotel venture in the 1980s, Batty and his family moved to Australia. He coached various teams in Queensland, including a spell as assistant coach for the Queensland Reds, and in 2004-2005 he coached Japanese Top League team Yamaha Jubilo. He later lived in the small rural community of Wallabadah, New South Wales.

Batty died in Queensland on 16 January 2026, at the age of 74.

== Views of other rugby players ==
Chris Laidlaw likened Batty to Robert Muldoon, 'small, stunted and radiating a single message to all around him: "Don't mess with me or I'll punch your lights out."'
