= Graham Whiting =

NZ international rugby union & league player (born 1946)

- Born: Graham John Whiting; 4 June 1946 (age 80) Whanganui, New Zealand
- Height: 1.91 m (6 ft 3 in)
- Weight: 110 kg (240 lb)
- School: Taumarunui High School

Rugby union career
- Position: Prop
Provincial / State sides
Years	Team	Apps	(Points)
1969–74	King Country	63	
International career
Years	Team	Apps	(Points)
1972–73	New Zealand	6	(0)
- Rugby league career

Playing information
Club
Years	Team	Pld	T	G	FG	P
1975	Maritime (ARL)

Graham John Whiting (born 4 June 1946) is a New Zealand former rugby footballer. A prop, Whiting represented King Country in rugby union at a provincial level, and was a member of the New Zealand national side, the All Blacks, from 1972 to 1973. He played 32 matches for the All Blacks including six internationals.

Whiting later switched to rugby league, playing for the Maritime club in the Auckland Rugby League competition in 1975.
