= Hamish Macdonald (rugby union) =

- Born: Hamish Hugh Macdonald; 11 January 1947 (age 79) Rawene, New Zealand
- Height: 1.90 m (6 ft 3 in)
- Weight: 102 kg (225 lb)
- School: King's College
- Notable relative: Angus Macdonald (son)

Rugby union career
- Position: Lock
Provincial / State sides
Years	Team	Apps	(Points)
1966	Poverty Bay		
1967–74	Canterbury		
1975–78	North Auckland		
International career
Years	Team	Apps	(Points)
1972–76	New Zealand	12	(4)

Hamish Hugh Macdonald (born 11 January 1947) is a former New Zealand rugby union player. A lock, Macdonald represented Poverty Bay, Canterbury, and North Auckland at a provincial level, and was a member of the New Zealand national side, the All Blacks, from 1972 to 1976. He played 48 matches for the All Blacks including 12 internationals.
