= Peter Whiting (rugby union) =

- Born: Peter John Whiting; 6 August 1946 (age 80) Auckland, New Zealand
- Height: 1.99 m (6 ft 6 in)
- Weight: 112 kg (247 lb)
- School: Auckland Grammar School

Rugby union career
- Position: Lock
Provincial / State sides
Years	Team	Apps	(Points)
1968–76	Auckland		
International career
Years	Team	Apps	(Points)
1971–76	New Zealand	20	(12)

Peter John Whiting (born 6 August 1946) is a former New Zealand rugby union player. A lock, Whiting represented Auckland at a provincial level, and was a member of the New Zealand national side, the All Blacks, from 1971 to 1976, and was known as a superb lineout expert. He played 56 matches for the All Blacks including 20 internationals.
