= Alan Sutherland (rugby union) =

New Zealand rugby union player (1944–2020)

- Born: Alan Richard Sutherland; 4 January 1944 Blenheim, New Zealand
- Died: 4 May 2020 (aged 76) South Africa
- Height: 1.91 m (6 ft 3 in)
- Weight: 108 kg (238 lb)
- School: Marlborough College
- Notable relative: Ivan Sutherland (brother)

Rugby union career
- Position(s): Number 8 Lock
Provincial / State sides
Years	Team	Apps	(Points)
1962–76	Marlborough	109	
International career
Years	Team	Apps	(Points)
1968–76	New Zealand	10	(12)
1977	Rhodesia		
National sevens team
Years	Team		Comps
1973	New Zealand		1

Alan Richard Sutherland (4 January 1944 – 4 May 2020) was a New Zealand rugby union player. A number 8 and lock, Sutherland represented Marlborough at a provincial level, and was a member of the New Zealand national side, the All Blacks, from 1968 to 1976. He played 64 matches for the All Blacks, of which three were as captain, including 10 internationals.

Sutherland died in South Africa on 4 May 2020.
