= Felton Mathew =

First Surveyor General of New Zealand (1801–1847)

Felton Mathew (1801 – 26 November 1847) was New Zealand's first Surveyor General. Central Auckland was laid out by him. Felton Mathew Avenue is named after him.

== Early life ==
Mathew was born at Goswell Street in London in 1801 to Felton Mathew (1757–1818) and Jane Carter (1763–1830). Nothing is known about his upbringing or education. In 1829, he became engaged to his cousin Sarah Mathew, (Note: Sarah was the daughter of Richard Mathew, Felton's father's (also called Felton) younger brother) the sister of George Felton Mathew; George was a close friend to the poet John Keats. The cousins would marry in Sydney on 21 January 1832. They had no children but Sarah gave birth to several still-born. From soon after their wedding, they lived at Windsor on the Hawkesbury River.

== Career in Australasia ==
In 1829, Felton Mathew arrived in New South Wales aboard Morley to take up appointment as Assistant-Surveyor of Roads and Bridges. In 1836, he was appointed by the Colonial Office in London as Town Surveyor at Sydney. Soon afterwards he turned down the position of Chief Surveyor at Port Phillip as he perceived the position less secure as it was a local position. This choice proved unfortunate for Mathew as in 1839, the Colonial Office decided that the Australian states should govern its own affairs and discontinued all appointments that it had made. It was at this point that Captain William Hobson arrived in Sydney and he offered Mathew the post of acting Surveyor-General of New Zealand. There are conflicting reports whether Mathew was given guarantees that this position be confirmed as permanent by the Colonial Office. In January 1840, the Mathews came to the Bay of Islands with Governor Hobson on HMS Herald.

Mathew was on Herald with Hobson in the Waitematā Harbour looking for a site for the future Auckland when Hobson had the stroke which almost incapacitated him. Mathew made another exploratory trip, examining the Waitematā Harbour, and was with the first party of officials to settle in Auckland in September 1840. He travelled down to Wellington and back with Hobson's party in 1841.

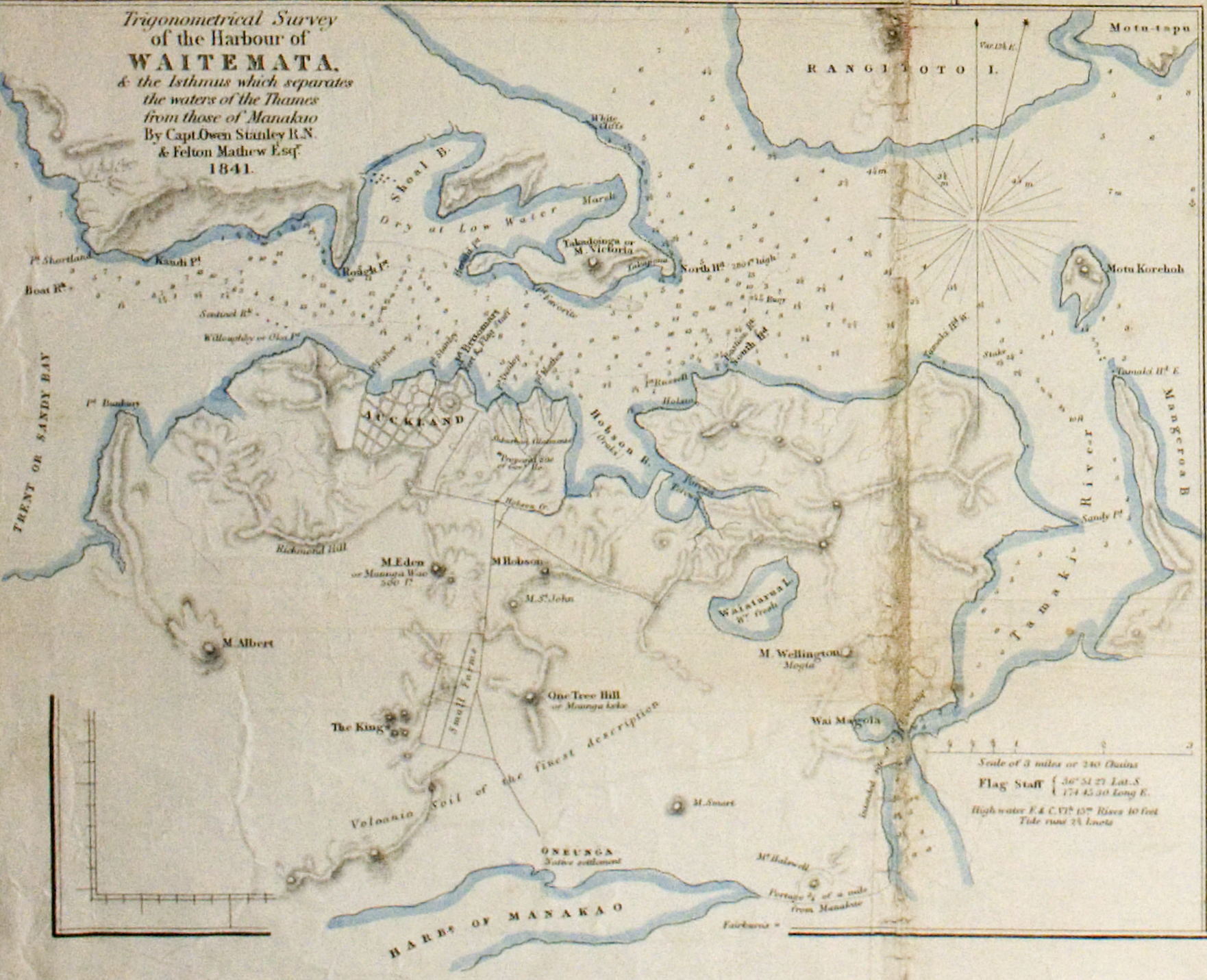
Trigonometrical Survey of the Harbour of Waitemata. Captain Owen Stanley, RN, and Felton Mathew, Surveyor General, 1841

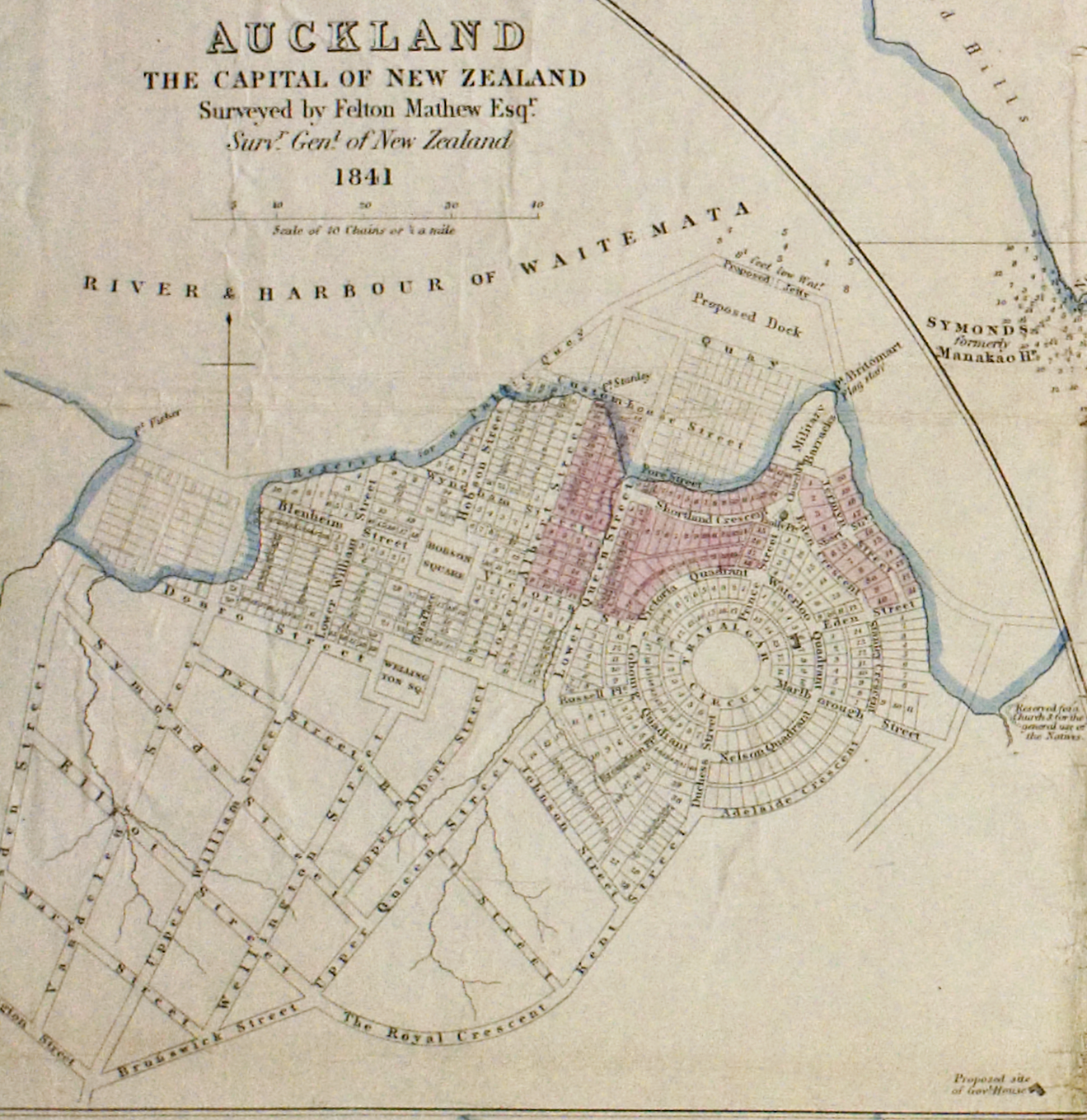
Auckland. The Capital of New Zealand. Felton Mathew, Surveyor General, 1841

== Later life and death ==
The Mathews visited England in 1845 to clarify the status of his appointment. They returned in March 1847 and faced difficulties with Governor George Grey. They sold their house and possessions and in September 1847 left for England. He fell ill on the journey and died in Lima, Peru, where he on account of his health had to leave the ship. His wife carried on to England and lived for the next decade in Sussex before she returned to New Zealand to sell their land holdings.

Historian James Rutherford described Mathew as "industrious and conscientious" but that there is nothing to suggest that he "possessed any exceptional abilities as Surveyor". Mathew was widely mocked for his layout of the town of Auckland but Rutherford contends that this is mostly unjustified. Rutherford states that a valid criticism of Mathew is that he paid more attention to level building land than to deep water for shipping.

== Bibliography ==
- Duder, Tessa (2015). Sarah Mathew: Explorer, Journalist and Auckland's 'First Lady'. David Ling Publishing Limited. ISBN 978-1-927305-07-2.
- Reid, Hilary F (1990). "Mathew, Sarah Louise 1805?–1890". Mathew, Sarah Louise. Te Ara: The Encyclopedia of New Zealand. Manatū Taonga Ministry for Culture and Heritage. (see The Encyclopedia of New Zealand)
- Mathew, Peggy. "Mathew Ancestors".
