= Peter McDonnell (rugby union) =

- Born: Peter McDonnell c.1874 Wanganui, New Zealand
- Died: 24 May 1950 Wanganui, New Zealand
- School: Wanganui High School; Te Aute College

Rugby union career
- Position: Wing Three-quarter
Amateur team(s)
Years	Team	Apps	(Points)
1893	Te Aute		
1895	Caledonian		
1894, 96, 98, 1900	Wanganui		
Provincial / State sides
Years	Team	Apps	(Points)
1893, 95	Hawke's Bay	2	
1894, 96, 98, 1900	Wanganui	9	(12)
International career
Years	Team	Apps	(Points)
1896	New Zealand	0	(0)

Peter McDonnell (c.1874– 24 May 1950) was a New Zealand rugby union player who represented the All Blacks in 1896. His position of choice was wing three-quarter. McDonnell did not play in any test matches as New Zealand did not play their first until 1903.

== Career ==
Described as "tricky and clever", McDonnell was educated at Wanganui High School and then Te Aute College. McDonnell first played provincially for Hawke's Bay in 1893. The next year he switched to the Wanganui province. He then returned to play for Hawke's Bay in 1895. In 1896 he again represented Wanganui and continued playing in the province until 1900.

It was in 1896, the start of his second stint playing for Wanganui that McDonnell became an All Black. He was called into the team to play Queensland in Wellington after the initial pick, Alfred Wilson, became unable to play because of injury. The game was won 9-0. McDonnell did not score any points in his sole appearance.

Also in 1896, while playing for Wanganui in a 32-0 win over Manawatu, McDonnell became the first player in New Zealand first class history to score four tries in a game.
