= Mavis Mullins =

New Zealand businesswoman

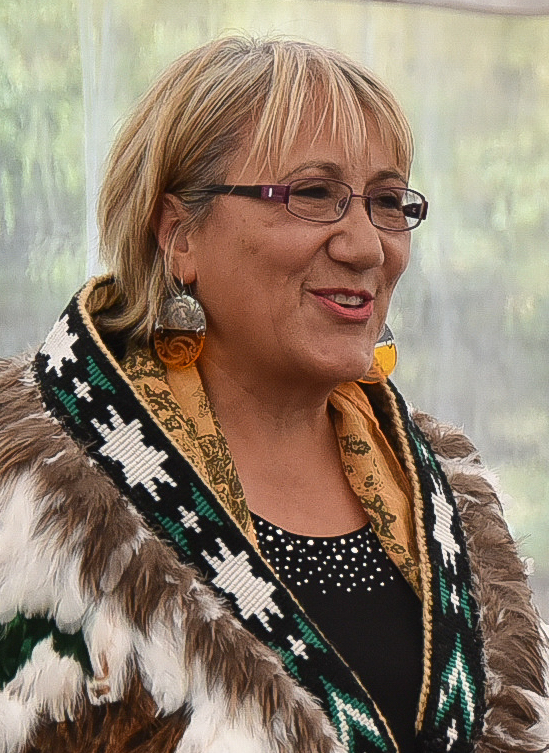
Mullins in 2020

Mavis Raylene Mullins MNZM (née Paewai) is a New Zealand businesswoman. She is Māori and identifies with Rangitāne, Te Atihaunui-a-Paparangi and Ngāti Ranginui iwi.

Mullins began her working life as a wool classer in her family's shearing business and soon moved into management of the business. Under her management, the company became the first shearing business in the world to achieve ISO 9002 accreditation. She and her husband later bought the company and renamed it Paewai Mullins Shearing Ltd.

In the late 1990s Mullins was appointed to the board of Landcorp, a position she held for seven years. In 1996 she graduated from Massey University with a Masters in Business Administration. She has held positions on the Massey University Council and the Mid-Central and Wairarapa District Health Boards.

In 2000, Mullins headed the launch of 2degrees, a telecommunications company, as part of her work with Te Huarahi Tika Trust.

She was a member of the Rangitane o Wairarapa and Rangitane o Tamaki nui-a-Rua negotiation team which worked on and successfully completed their Treaty of Waitangi Deed of Settlement. The settlement was signed in August 2016. She also heads Tu Mai Ra, the post-settlement entity, chairs the board of Taratahi Agricultural Training Centre and serves on the boards of Wool Industry Research Ltd, Hautaki Ltd, Te Hou Ltd.

== Recognition ==
In the 2002 Queen's Birthday and Golden Jubilee Honours, Mullins was appointed a Member of the New Zealand Order of Merit, for services to the wool industry. In 2016 Mullins won the Rural category of the New Zealand Women of Influence Awards. The same year, she was named University of Auckland Business School Aotearoa Maori Business Leaders Awards' inaugural Business Woman of the Year. In 2017, Mullins was inducted into the New Zealand Business Hall of Fame.

== Family ==
Mullins is married and has four children and 14 grandchildren. Her grandfather was an All Black, Lui Paewai.
