= Nehe Milner-Skudder =

NZ international rugby union player

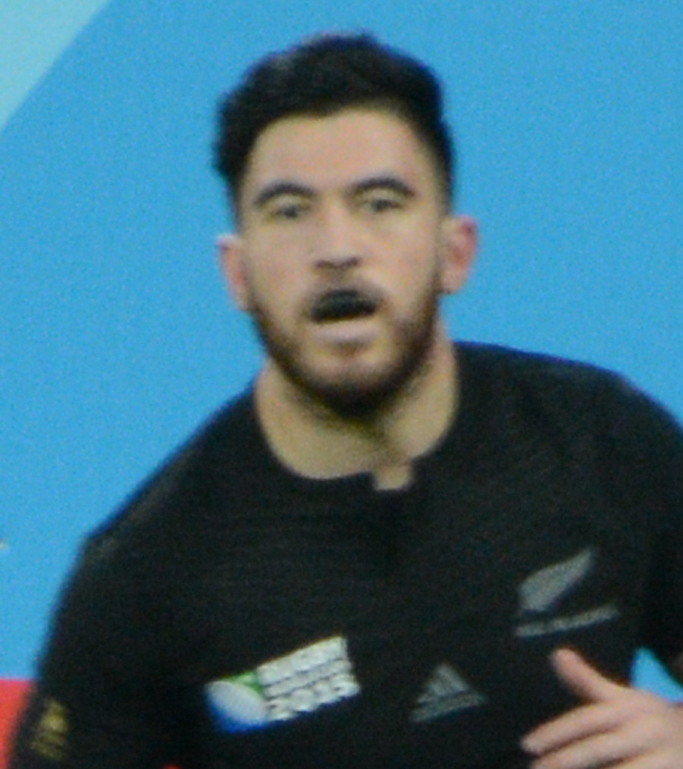
- Full name: Nehe Rihara Milner-Skudder
- Born: 15 December 1990 (age 35) Taihape, New Zealand
- Height: 180 cm (5 ft 11 in)
- Weight: 90 kg (198 lb; 14 st 2 lb)
- School: Queen Elizabeth College
- University: Massey University
- Notable relative(s): Tanerau Latimer (cousin); Ben Atiga (cousin); Buff Milner (cousin); George Skudder (uncle)

Rugby union career
- Position(s): Fullback, wing
- Current team: Rugby New York
Senior career
Years	Team	Apps	(Points)
2011–2021, 2023	Manawatu	64	(50)
2015–2019	Hurricanes	36	(40)
2019–2020	Toulon	0	(0)
2020–21	Highlanders	1	(0)
2021	Ngāti Porou East Coast	1	(5)
2022	Rugby New York	6	(5)
2022	Wellington	6	(20)
- Correct as of 18 October 2023
International career
Years	Team	Apps	(Points)
2014–2017	Māori All Blacks	3	(10)
2015–2018	New Zealand	13	(60)
2015	Barbarian F.C.	2	(5)
2018	World XV	1	(0)
- Correct as of 11 September 2022

Nehe Rihara Milner-Skudder (born 15 December 1990) is a New Zealand rugby union player who last played for the Rugby New York.

He was selected for the All Blacks in 2015, and was a key member of 2015 Rugby World Cup winning team. He scored New Zealand's first try in the 2015 RWC final, going over in the far right corner just before half time, and was awarded the World Rugby Breakthrough Player of the Year in 2015.

== Family background ==
Milner-Skudder was born 15 December 1990 in Taihape, New Zealand. On the Maori side he is of the Ngati Porou and Tapuika tribes.

Heneriata Milner is a cousin of the late All Black centre Henare 'Buff' Milner, an All Black in 1968–1970. Milner-Skudder's father Richard is a younger brother of George Skudder (George represented the All Blacks, also as a winger in 1969 and 1972).

Another All Black Tanerau Latimer (five tests; six games 2009) is Nehe's first cousin. Ben Atiga was another All Black (1 test 2003) from the same wider family. Their forefathers were born and raised in Lapaha, Tongatapu in Tonga, before they left to New Zealand. Two members of the earlier generations of the Skudder family were part of 94 a group of Tongans who volunteered to join the Pioneer Maori Battalion and Niue Battalion during WWI.

== Domestic career ==
Milner-Skudder began his professional career by switching to rugby league and was a member of the Sydney-based, Canterbury Bulldogs Under-20s Holden Cup team in 2009 and 2010. He moved back to New Zealand for 2011 and linked up with the Massey University rugby union team, before being selected by his local ITM Cup side, Manawatu, debuting during the 2011 season. He quickly established himself as a regular in the Manawatu starting line-ups and although injury limited him to just five appearances in 2013 he was named as a member of the Hurricanes wider training group for the 2014 Super Rugby season. A very impressive ITM Cup campaign in 2014 in which Manawatu topped the Championship division saw him upgraded to the Hurricanes official squad for 2015.

Milner-Skudder sustained a serious shoulder injury against the Blues in March 2016, requiring surgery to be performed. This meant he missed out on the rest of the Hurricanes' successful Super Rugby campaign that year- which saw the Hurricanes win the title after beating the Lions of South Africa in the 2016 Super Rugby final. Milner-Skudder's injury, along with Julian Savea's poor form saw the Hurricanes back-line change extensively throughout the campaign, before settling for Jason Woodward and former All Black Cory Jane on the wings, while James Marshall was shifted to fullback.

Milner-Skudder began training with Manawatu for the 2016 ITM Cup, but did not play as he had not recovered properly. However, in 2017, Milner-Skudder was released from the All Blacks, thus being able to play a game for Manawatu.

Due to his injury-complicated signing with Toulon, his highly-anticipated signing was effectively cancelled without an appearance. Instead, Milner-Skudder signed with the Highlanders for the 2020 & 2021 Super Rugby seasons, he would only make one appearance in this stint, starting at fullback in a 41-22 loss in Wellington against his former side, the Hurricanes, this was his first top-flight game since 2018. After a standout 2021 NPC for Manawatu, acting in a player-assistant coach role for the Turbos, Milner-Skudder signed to return to the Hurricanes for the 2022 Super Rugby Pacific season.

In early May 2022, Rugby New York announced they had signed Milner-Skudder for the remainder of the 2022 MLR Season. He started 6 games and scored one try en route to the club winning their maiden MLR championship.

== International career ==
Of Ngāti Porou and Tapuika descent, Milner-Skudder was called up to the Māori All Blacks squad for their 2014 end-of-year tour of Japan. He was selected for the All Blacks in 2015. He scored two tries for the All Blacks in his first Test against Australia in Sydney on 8 August 2015; Milner-Skudder was, along with Sonny Bill Williams, one of two former Bulldogs in the All Blacks team. He later roomed with Williams in Britain after being selected to play at the 2015 Rugby World Cup. Milner-Skudder went on to win the 2015 Rugby World Cup with New Zealand, scoring the first try in the 34-17 final win over Australia and being named by the Guardian as one of the players of the tournament.

In May 2016, Milner-Skudder did not make the All Blacks squad for the three test series against Wales due to injury. Milner-Skudder, Charlie Ngatai, James Broadhurst and Sonny Bill Williams were all not considered for selection due to injury for the rest of the entire year. Milner-Skudder returned to Super Rugby in 2017 but had an ankle injury in round three. The injury meant missing out on selection for the All Blacks against the British and Irish Lions, but Milner-Skudder was selected for the Maori All Blacks instead. However, Milner-Skudder was selected for the 2017 Rugby Championship. He played his first test in nearly two years against Argentina in New Plymouth, where he scored a try in the All Blacks 39-22 win.

That same year, Milner-Skudder was awarded Man of the Match for his performance in the first test against South Africa which included two tries. In the second test against South Africa, Milner-Skudder left the field at half time with another serious shoulder injury, ruling him out of rugby for at least 6 months.

Against Japan on 3 November 2018 Milner-Skudder led the Ka Mate version of Haka before the match for his first and only time.

== International tries ==
Try	Opponent	Location	Venue	Competition	Date	Result
1, 2	Australia	Sydney	ANZ Stadium	2015 Rugby Championship	8 August 2015	Lost 27–19
3, 4	Namibia	London, England	Olympic Stadium	2015 Rugby World Cup	24 September 2015	Won 58–14
5, 6	Tonga	Newcastle, England	St. James' Park	2015 Rugby World Cup	9 October 2015	Won 47–9
7	France	Cardiff, Wales	Millennium Stadium	2015 Rugby World Cup	17 October 2015	Won 62–13
8	Australia	London, England	Twickenham	2015 Rugby World Cup	31 October 2015	Won 34–17
9	Argentina	New Plymouth, New Zealand	Yarrow Stadium	2017 Rugby Championship	9 September 2017	Won 39–22
10, 11	South Africa	Albany, New Zealand	QBE Stadium	2017 Rugby Championship	16 September 2017	Won 57–0
12	Argentina	Nelson, New Zealand	Trafalgar Park	2018 Rugby Championship	8 September 2018	Won 46–24

Awards
Preceded by Aaron Smith	Tom French Memorial; Māori rugby union player of the year 2015	Succeeded by Dane Coles
