= Whanganui Rugby Football Union =

Governing body for rugby union in the Whanganui region of New Zealand

Wanganui Rugby Football Union
- Nickname: Butcher Boys
- Founded: 1888; 138 years ago
- Region: Hurricanes
- Ground: Cooks Gardens
- Chairman: (New Zealand) Jeff Phillips
- Coach: (New Zealand) Jason Caskey
- League: Heartland Championship
Team kit

Official website
- www.whanganuirugby.co.nz

The Whanganui Rugby Football Union (WRFU) is the governing body for rugby union in the Whanganui region of New Zealand. The Whanganui Rugby Football Union was formed in 1888.

The Whanganui team play from Cooks Gardens, Whanganui, and have enjoyed much success on the playing field throughout their history. Although not a First division team they are one of the leading provinces in terms of the number of lower divisional titles won.

== History ==
The Whanganui Rugby Football Union was formed on 11 April 1888. It then joined the NZRFU as a foundation member in 1892. Wanganui's first official game after affiliation with the NZRFU was against the British and Irish Lions in 1888, with a 1–1 draw being more than encouraging for the union. In 1913 Whanganui played Australia and won 11-6 and in 1966 (with King Country) they won against touring side, British and Irish Lions 12–6.

== Club rugby ==
Wanganui Rugby Football Union is made up of 13 clubs:

- Counties
- Border
- Hunterville
- Kaierau
- Marist
- Marton Rugby and Sports Club
- Ngamatapouri
- Ratana
- Ruapehu
- Taihape
- Utiku Old Boys
- Wanganui Pirates
- Wanganui Tech

=== Club champions ===
==== President's Rosebowl ====
- 2026 - Marist 16-15 Counties
- 2025 - Taihape 15-14 Kaierau
- 2024 - Border 36-34 Kaierau
- 2023 - Border 24-23 Taihape
- 2022 - Border 16-15 Taihape

==== Premier Women ====
- 2026 - Freyberg OB 31-24 Taihape
- 2025 - Marist 42-5 Taihape

== Provincial rugby ==
Whanganui previously played in the Second division North Island provincial competition and subsequently in the National Provincial Championship (NPC) Third division. In 2006 when the national rugby competitions were restructured, Whanganui entered the Heartland Championship, a competition for New Zealand's smaller provincial unions. They have been regular winners or finalists of Heartland trophies.

=== Honours ===
Competition	Champion	Runner up
National Provincial Championship Second Division (North)		1976, 1982, 1983, 1984
National Provincial Championship Third Division	1989, 1996, 2003	1988, 1993
Heartland Championship Meads Cup	2008, 2009, 2011, 2015, 2016, 2017	2006, 2007, 2010, 2012, 2019, 2022, 2023
Heartland Championship Lochore Cup	2014, 2021, 2026	

=== Heartland Championship placings ===
Heartland Championship results
Year	Pld	W	D	L	PF	PA	PD	BP	Pts	Place	Playoffs		
Year	Pld	W	D	L	PF	PA	PD	BP	Pts	Place	Qual	Semifinal	Final
2006	8	7	1	0	309	146	+163	5	35	1st	Meads Cup	Won 30–17 against Mid Canterbury	Lost 14–16 to Wairarapa Bush
2007	8	5	0	3	206	135	+71	6	26	3rd	Meads Cup	Won 18–0 against Mid Canterbury	Lost 8–25 to North Otago
2008	8	8	0	0	353	78	+275	7	39	1st	Meads Cup	Won 40–18 against West Coast	Won 27–12 against Mid Canterbury
2009	8	6	0	2	275	108	+167	6	30	2nd	Meads Cup	Won 48–13 against Poverty Bay	Won 34–13 against Mid Canterbury
2010	8	7	0	1	254	134	+120	6	34	1st	Meads Cup	Won 31–24 against Poverty Bay	Lost 18–39 to North Otago
2011	8	7	0	1	364	117	+247	7	35	1st	Meads Cup	Won 32–22 against Mid Canterbury	Won 30–10 against East Coast
2012	8	7	0	1	237	133	+104	3	31	2nd	Meads Cup	Won 23–20 against Wairarapa Bush	Lost 27–29 to East Coast
2013	8	4	0	4	171	160	+11	5	21	6th	Lochore Cup	Lost 30–40 to Buller	—
2014	8	3	0	5	203	194	+9	5	17	8th	Lochore Cup	Won 37–6 against King Country	Won 16–12 against North Otago
2015	8	6	1	1	318	185	+133	7	33	3rd	Meads Cup	Won 26–11 against Mid Canterbury	Won 28–11 against South Canterbury
2016	8	8	0	0	362	110	+252	6	38	1st	Meads Cup	Won 58–26 against Wairarapa Bush	Won 20–18 against Buller
2017	8	5	0	3	338	163	+175	6	26	4th	Meads Cup	Won 29–24 against South Canterbury	Won 30–14 against Horowhenua-Kapiti
2018	8	8	0	0	331	113	+218	7	39	1st	Meads Cup	Lost 7–17 to Thames Valley	—
2019	8	5	0	3	294	184	+110	8	28	4th	Meads Cup	Won 20-15 against Thames Valley	Lost 19-33 to North Otago
2021	8	6	0	2	286	149	+137	6	30	3rd	Lochore Cup	No semi final played	Won 22-16 against North Otago
2022	8	7	0	1	352	142	+210	8	36	2nd	Meads Cup	Won 25-18 against Thames Valley	Lost 36-47 to South Canterbury
2023	8	6	0	2	264	156	+108	8	32	2nd	Meads Cup	Won 38-3 against Thames Valley	Lost 30-40 to South Canterbury
2024	8	6	0	2	383	199	+184	7	31	2nd	Meads Cup	Lost 15-38 to Thames Valley	—
2025	8	5	0	3	258	220	+38	1	26	5th	Lochore Cup	Lost 18–40 to Horowhenua-Kapiti	—
2026	8	5	0	3	316	196	+120	7	27	7th	Lochore Cup	Won 39-38 against Horowhenua-Kapiti	Won 43-42 against South Canterbury

There was no competition in 2020 due to Covid-19.

=== Meads Cup winning teams ===
2015 Steelform Wanganui Heartland extended squad

Forwards: Brett Turner (Pirates); Bryn Hudson (Ngamatapouri); Cole Baldwin (Border); Daniel Fitzgerald (Marist); Fraser Hammond (Ruapehu); Kamipeli Latu (Border); Kieran Hussey (Border); Lasa Ulukuta (Pirates); Malakai Volau (Utiku OB); Peter Rowe (Ruapehu)(Captain); Renato Tikoilosomone (Border); Roman Tutauha (Ruapehu); Sam Madams (Border); Tololi Moala (Pirates); Viki Tofa (Marist). * John Smyth Brought in as injury cover.

Backs: Areta Lama (Kaierau); Ace Malo (Kaierau); Denning Tyrell (Pirates); Jaye Flaws (Taihape); Kane Tamou (Ratana); Lindsay Horrocks (Border); Michael Nabuliwaqe (Utiku OB); Poasa Waqanibau (Border); Samu Kubunavanua (Utiku OB); Simon Dibben (Marist); Stephen Pereofeta (Wanganui Collegiate); Troy Brown (Ruapehu); William Short (Ruapehu); Zyon Hekenui (Ruapehu); Trinity Spooner-Neera (Hawkes Bay)

== Ranfurly Shield ==
Ranfurly Shield
Challenges	28
Won	0
Defences	0

=== Matches ===
14 September 1907	Auckland	6–5	Wanganui	Auckland
27 June 1914	Taranaki	17–3	Wanganui	Hawera
4 October 1919	Wellington	30–3	Wanganui	Wellington
28 August 1920	Wellington	20–14	Wanganui	Wellington
3 June 1926	Hawke's Bay	36–3	Wanganui	Hastings
3 September 1927	Manawhenua	25–6	Wanganui	Palmerston North
26 July 1930	Southland	19–0	Wanganui	Invercargill
16 August 1934	Hawke's Bay	39–16	Wanganui	Napier
21 August 1948	Otago	20–3	Wanganui	Dunedin
1951	Waikato	14–0	Wanganui	Hamilton
1954	Canterbury	17–13	Wanganui	Christchurch
1956	Canterbury	19–6	Wanganui	Christchurch
1957	Wellington	34–5	Wanganui	Wellington
1958	Taranaki	22–9	Wanganui	New Plymouth
1959	Taranaki	17–11	Wanganui	New Plymouth
1963	Auckland	41–18	Wanganui	Auckland
1963	Taranaki	14–12	Wanganui	New Plymouth
1964	Taranaki	15–15	Wanganui	New Plymouth
1965	Taranaki	23–9	Wanganui	New Plymouth
1973	Marlborough	30–6	Wanganui	Blenheim
1976	Auckland	16–9	Wanganui	Auckland
1977	Manawatu	26–9	Wanganui	Palmerston North
1982	Wellington	30–9	Wanganui	Wellington
1987	Auckland	59–6	Wanganui	Auckland
2000	Waikato	86–3	Wanganui	Tokoroa
2009	Wellington	61–6	Wanganui	Whanganui
2010	Southland	62–6	Wanganui	Invercargill
2012	Taranaki	51–7	Wanganui	Inglewood
2016	Waikato	32-12	Wanganui	Cambridge

=== Wanganui v Taranaki challenge of 1964 ===
A 15-all draw against the powerful in Taranaki side of 1964 remains the closest the men from Wanganui have ever come to winning the Ranfurly Shield.

Into the last minutes of the match Wanganui held a 12–11 lead and even if on paper and in the match itself they had seemed the inferior team it seemed as if they would hang on. Their hero was wing Colin Pierce who had kicked all of Wanganui's points from penalties to put them ahead even though Taranaki had gained tries to John McCullough and Ross Brown.

Wanganui might well have won as the match approached the final minute but for excitement of their supporters who thinking they were part of a historic moment as Wanganui had never won the Ranfurly Shield crowded the touchline.

A desperate Brown had dropped for goal trying to gain the winning points. When it had missed Pierce had dashed to the 22 and taken a quick drop out. In the event his hurried kick had landed among the Wanganui spectators and they gave referee John Pring and touch judge George Brightwell a dilemma for they were both unsighted by the sideline mayhem were not sure whether the ball had bounced or gone out on a full.

Pring ruled that it had been on the full and so that last scrum of the match in what was the last set-piece took place on the Wanganui 22 and it was from there that Taranaki worked the move from which replacement wing Kerry Hurley grubber kicked ahead and won the chase as the ball bounced just a feet from touch over the Wanganui goal-line. And that was it: Taranaki had won 14–12.

== All Blacks ==
There have been 17 players selected for the All Blacks while playing club rugby in Whanganui:

- Moke Belliss
- John Blair
- George Bullock-Douglas
- Andrew Donald
- Keith Gudsell
- Peter Henderson
- John Hogan
- Peter Johns
- Peter McDonnell
- Sandy McNicol
- Henare Milner
- Peter Murray
- Bill Osborne
- Waate Potaka
- Harrison Rowley
- Peina Taituha
- Hector Thomson

=== Other All Blacks from Whanganui ===
Andy Haden (All Black 1972-85) was born in 1950 in Whanganui and attended Wanganui Boys' College before he played senior rugby for Massey University in 1970 and moved to Auckland in early 1971.

Glen Osborne, a nephew of Bill Osborne, played representative rugby for Wanganui from 1990 to 1991. He joined North Harbour in 1992 and played for the All Blacks from 1995 until 1999.

Charlie Seeling (All Black 1904-08) started his rugby career for Wanganui before moving to Auckland from where he was selected for the original All Blacks.

== Notable players ==
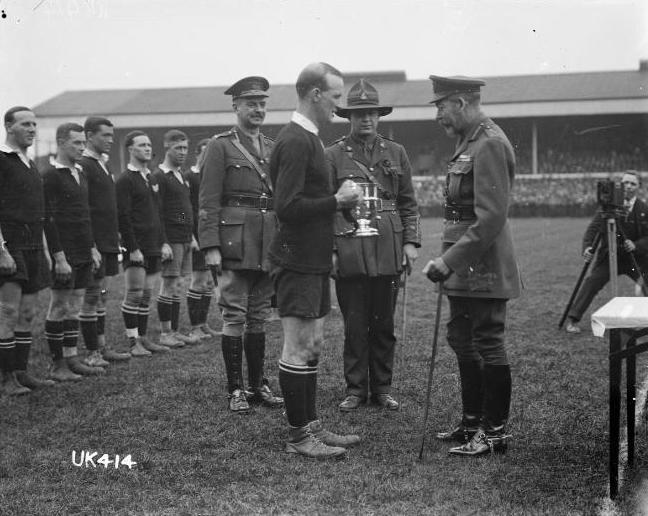
The Kings Cup awarded to New Zealand.

=== John Blair ===
In 1897 John Blair became the first of 17 Wanganui players to pull on an All Blacks jersey.

=== Moke Belliss ===
Until the emergence of Bill Osborne in 1975, Ernest (‘Moke’) Belliss was without doubt Wanganui's greatest contribution to New Zealand rugby. Belliss made his representative debut for Wanganui in 1914 before enlisting to serve during World War II. He first came to national attention as a member of the New Zealand Army rugby team of 1919 which won the King's Cup tournament in Britain and then toured South Africa. Belliss played in the three home tests against the 1921 Springboks and captained the All Blacks in Australia the following year. Belliss has been compared to later players such as Waka Nathan and Buck Shelford. Commentator Winston McCarthy remembered him as hard, tough and fast, a good handler and a ferocious tackler. His opponents feared him and players of his era ranked him with the world's best. His son Jack captained Wanganui until the early 1950s and his grandson Peter Belliss was a flanker or lock for the side in the 1970s before turning his attention to bowls, a sport in which he won two world titles.

=== Bill Osborne ===
Born and bred in Whanganui, midfield back Bill Osborne graduated from the Whanganui High School first XV straight into the Kaierau senior side. In 1973 he made his debut for Wanganui four days after his 18th birthday. Selection for the New Zealand Colts followed in 1974 and he made the All Blacks for the waterlogged test against Scotland at Eden Park in 1975. He played in 14 of the 24 matches on the 1976 tour of South Africa. In 1978 Osborne lost his spot for the home series against Australia to Bay of Plenty's Mark Taylor. He won his place back for the end-of-year tour of Britain and Ireland and played in all four internationals as the All Blacks completed their first-ever Grand Slam against the home unions. Osborne and Bruce Robertson of Counties formed one of the great midfield combinations of any All Black era.

In all Osborne played 48 times for New Zealand, including 16 tests. Having retired in 1981, he made a comeback the following season, playing in two of the three tests against Australia before once more announcing his retirement. Again he had a change of heart and by now representing Waikato he was selected for the All Blacks side to tour South Africa in 1985. This tour was cancelled as a result of court action taken against the New Zealand Rugby Union. A replacement tour of Argentina was arranged but Osborne withdrew from the side. In 1986 he joined all but two of the 1985 selections on the unsanctioned New Zealand Cavaliers tour of South Africa.

=== Trevor Olney ===
While he might not have reached the heights of Belliss and Osborne, Trevor Olney was hailed as an unsung hero by many in New Zealand's provincial unions. Between 1973 and 1990 Olney played a record 146 times for Wanganui. These were amateur days in which a player had to fit training and matches around a full-time job, so his commitment over 18 seasons was truly remarkable. He also played for New Zealand Māori.

=== Bob Barrell ===
Bob Barrell debuted in 1963. He was an All Black trialist in 1976 and top New Zealand point scorer that year with 164 points. He scored a record 980 points for the union in first class matches between 1963 and 1977.

He also played three games for Wairarapa Bush in 1979 when working as the principal of Taratahi Agricultural Training Centre. Barrell played club rugby for Marton Old Boys and in 1986 when he moved to Taihape he played for Utiku Old Boys.

In 2026 Barrell was made a patron of the Union.

== Super Rugby ==
Wanganui comes within the Hurricanes region, along with Wellington, Wairarapa Bush, Poverty Bay, Hawke's Bay, Manawatu and Horowhenua-Kapiti.
