= Tanerau Latimer =

NZ international rugby union player

- Born: Tanerau Dylan Latimer; 6 May 1986 (age 40) Te Puke, Bay of Plenty, New Zealand
- Height: 1.83 m (6 ft 0 in)
- Weight: 101 kg (15 st 13 lb; 223 lb)
- School: Tauranga Boys' College
- Notable relative(s): George Skudder (uncle); Nehe Milner-Skudder (cousin); Ben Atiga (cousin)

Rugby union career
- Position: Flanker
- Current team: Bay of Plenty
Senior career
Years	Team	Apps	(Points)
2004–2013	Bay of Plenty	79	(27)
2006	Crusaders	5	(15)
2007–2014	Chiefs	108	(35)
2014–2016	Toshiba Brave Lupus	13	(5)
2016	Blues	5	(0)
2016–2018	Bayonne	32	(5)
2018	Bay of Plenty	4	(0)
- Correct as of 16 June 2022
International career
Years	Team	Apps	(Points)
2006–2012	Māori All Blacks	17	(5)
2009	New Zealand	6	(0)
- Correct as of 23 November 2012
Medal record
Men's rugby sevens
Representing New Zealand
Commonwealth Games
Gold medal – first place	2006 Melbourne	Team competition

Tanerau Dylan Latimer (born 6 May 1986) is a New Zealand rugby union footballer who plays for the Bay of Plenty.

== Career ==
=== Super Rugby ===
Latimer made his Super Rugby debut for the Crusaders in 2006, before shifting to the Chiefs in 2007. In 2009 he started at openside flanker in the Chiefs loss to the Bulls in the final at Loftus Versfeld. In 2011 he played his 50th match for the Chiefs and reach to his 100th match in 2014, defeated Stormers at Waikato Stadium.

In November 2015, the Auckland Blues announced that they had signed Latimer on a one-year loan for the 2016 Super Rugby season.

=== Sevens ===
At the 2006 Commonwealth Games he was part of the New Zealand Sevens team that won a gold medal. He is New Zealand's youngest ever Sevens player, debuting at the age of 17 in 2004.

=== International ===
He was selected for the 2009 Iveco series after an injury to Richie McCaw sidelined him for the Series. He has played in total five tests and one non-test match for the All Blacks. In 2010 he played for the then New Zealand Maori. In 2012 he was named as the team's captain, under the new team name, Maori All Blacks.

=== Japan Top League ===
In 2014 Latimer moved to the Top League competition in Japan, where he plays for the Toshiba Brave Lupus as a flanker.

=== France ===
On 23 June 2016, Latimer made move to France to join Bayonne from the 2016–17 season.
