= Peina Taituha =

- Born: 30 April 1901 Wanganui, New Zealand
- Died: 25 February 1958 (aged 56) Rata, New Zealand
- School: Te Aute College

Rugby union career
- Position: Second five-eighth / Wing
Provincial / State sides
| Years | Team | Apps | (Points) |
- Hawke's Bay
- Wanganui
International career
| Years | Team | Apps | (Points) |
| 1923 | New Zealand | | |

Peina Taituha (30 April 1901 – 25 February 1958) was a New Zealand international rugby union player. Sources vary on his name, which has been rendered as both Taituha Peina and Taituha Peina King, as well as simply Taituha or Peina.

Taituha was born in Wanganui and educated at Te Aute College.

Mainly a second five-eighth or winger, Taituha initially played for Hawke's Bay and was only 16 on his provincial debut. He later competed for his home province Wanganui, where he was a member of the Rata club, playing alongside All Black Waate Potaka. During the 1920s, Taituha regularly represented New Zealand Maori and made two All Blacks appearances in 1923, for a home series against New South Wales.

== See also ==
- List of New Zealand national rugby union players
