= Rossborough =

Rossborough is a surname. Notable people with the surname include:

- Peter Rossborough (born 1948), English rugby union player

== See also ==
- The Rossborough Inn, a historic building in Prince George's County, Maryland, United States
- Ross Borough, a former borough council in New Zealand
