= Alex (novel series) =

New Zealand novel quartet by Tessa Duder

The Alex quartet
- Alex; Alex in Winter; Alessandra: Alex in Rome; Songs for Alex
- Author: Tessa Duder
- Country: New Zealand
- Genre: Young adult fiction
- Publisher: Penguin Books New Zealand (NZ); Oxford University Press (UK); Houghton Mifflin (USA)
- Published: 1987–1992
- No. of books: 4

The Alex quartet is a series of four young adult novels written by New Zealand author Tessa Duder: Alex (1987), Alex in Winter (1989), Alessandra: Alex in Rome (1991) and Songs for Alex (1992). Set in the 1950s, the series follows the competitive swimming career of headstrong New Zealand teenager Alex Archer.

The books have been published in New Zealand and overseas (with the first book titled In Lane Three, Alex Archer in the US edition), and have received significant critical attention and commercial success. Duder received a number of notable awards for the series, including three times winning the New Zealand Children's Book of the Year Award and three times winning the Esther Glen Award.

== Plot overview ==
The quartet is set predominantly in 1950s Auckland, New Zealand. The main character, Alex Archer, is a strong-willed fifteen-year-old competitive swimmer. In the first book, Alex (1987, also published as In Lane Three, Alex Archer in the United States in 1989) she is competing with her rival and friend, Maggie Benton, to qualify for the 1960 Olympics in Rome. She also experiences first love and must juggle swimming with her other loves of music, dance and other sports, as well as her School Certificate exams.

The second book, Alex in Winter, takes place after the death of Alex's first love Andy and as she and Maggie both await announcement of New Zealand's Olympic squad. It is described by The Oxford Companion to New Zealand Literature as "far bleaker" than the first book, as Alex "turns against friends, family and the conformist, patriarchal society around her". While both she and Maggie are selected for the squad, Maggie is hospitalised with peritonitis and is unable to join.

In Alessandra: Alex in Rome, Alex competes at the 1960 Olympics in Rome, and meets a young New Zealander named Tom who is studying opera singing. The novel switches between narration by Tom and by Alex, and covers Alex's experiences as the youngest member of the New Zealand Olympic team. In the final novel, Songs for Alex, Alex returns to New Zealand and her final year of school. She faces various pressures from her family, the media and the sports world, and academically. Her relationship with Tom continues to develop and she considers whether to continue swimming competitively or to explore other avenues such as university.

== Background and publication history ==
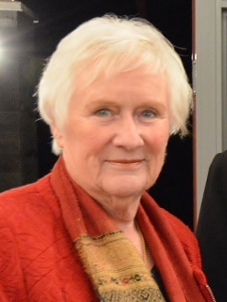
Author Tessa Duder in 2015

Alex was Tessa Duder's third novel, following Night Race to Kawau (1982), which also featured a strong young female protagonist, and Jellybean (1985), about the relationship of a mother and daughter. The novels in the quartet were originally published by Penguin Books New Zealand, by Oxford University Press in the United Kingdom and by Houghton Mifflin in the US. The quartet has been translated into several languages.

Duder has said that she first came up with the character of Alex in Kuala Lumpur in 1981: "Alex appeared in my head almost fully formed like some mythological goddess." She wrote the book five years later in a period of eight months in 1986.

Duder herself had a swimming career, including winning a silver medal for New Zealand at the 1958 British Empire and Commonwealth Games in Cardiff. While the series is often assumed to be semi-autobiographical because of Duder's own swimming career, Duder has said:

I made a lot up. As a swimmer training for selection for the 1958 Empire Games, I had no serious rival for my place on the team, no broken leg, no melt-down resulting from exhaustion, no devastating loss close to a big race. I will admit to being in love for the first time, and this affair ending if not with a death but still unhappily; so some heartbreak and authenticity there.

The first novel sold more than 30,000 copies and has been a best-seller in New Zealand; in 1999 it was Penguin New Zealand's best-selling fiction book of all time. In 2012 the first book was republished by Whitcoulls as a Modern Classic. In October 2019, OneTree House published all four books as a quartet, including a foreword by Lani Wendt Young. A quartet edition had previously been published in 1992.

== Critical reception ==
A review of the first book by Publishers Weekly noted that although the book would attract sports enthusiasts, it appeals to a wider audience; Duder "profiles a teenaged feminist who breaks the boundaries of her conservative society in 1959". The review concluded that readers would "not fail to be uplifted by this talented writer's thoughtful novel". The School Library Journal in 1990 noted the lack of sports literature for girls at that time, and highlighted the first book of the quartet as containing "well-developed, realistic, three-dimensional characters", with Duder's writing style "hook[ing] readers from the outset".

A review of Alex in Winter in The Press described it as a "thoughtful" sequel to the first novel, with Alex's character allowing her to triumph over challenging life events including the death of her first love. The review recommended the book for young readers, particularly "aspiring athletes".

A review of Alessandra: Alex in Rome by The Horn Book Magazine said it stood well as a standalone novel despite references to events of the previous books, and noted that "numerous details about Rome, competitive swimming, and the Olympic experience add a sense of vivid immediacy and help to draw readers into the dramatic plot". By contrast, the School Library Journal suggested it would disappoint readers who had enjoyed the first novel: "The unsatisfying plot, along with abbreviated or run-on sentences, awkward phrasing, overblown phrases and descriptions, and Kiwi jargon, will lose all but the most determined readers".

A review of the final book, Songs for Alex, in the New Zealand Review of Books, noted that Alex continues to be a difficult character and that some readers will find her "more egocentric, more enclosed, more sour than ever", but concludes that "those who have enjoyed the series will not find Songs For Alex lacking in the qualities that pleased them, and they will doubtless applaud the conclusion".

== Awards and legacy ==
The quartet received several notable awards in New Zealand. Alex, Alex in Winter and Songs for Alex won the New Zealand Children's Book of the Year Award in 1988, 1990 and 1993 respectively, while Alessandra: Alex in Rome placed third in the senior fiction section of the children's book awards in 1992. Alex, Alex in Winter and Alessandra: Alex in Rome won the Esther Glen Award in 1989, 1990 and 1992 respectively.

In 1990 Alex was included on the American Library Association's list of best books for young adults.

In 2022, Duder was interviewed about her decision to include mentions of Alex's menstruation and its impact on her swimming in the book. She recalled criticism from fellow New Zealand author Jack Lasenby for what he saw as an inappropriate inclusion in a children's book, but said she did not see the references as ground-breaking: "it was just part of her story growing up as a 15-year-old in a competitive sport".

== Film adaptation ==
The first novel was adapted into the 1993 film Alex, directed by Megan Simpson and with a screenplay written by Ken Catran.
