= Maaka =

Maaka may be,

- Maaka language, Nigeria
- Golan Maaka, New Zealand
