= John Staveley =

New Zealand haematologist (1914–2006)

Major Sir John Staveley KBE MC
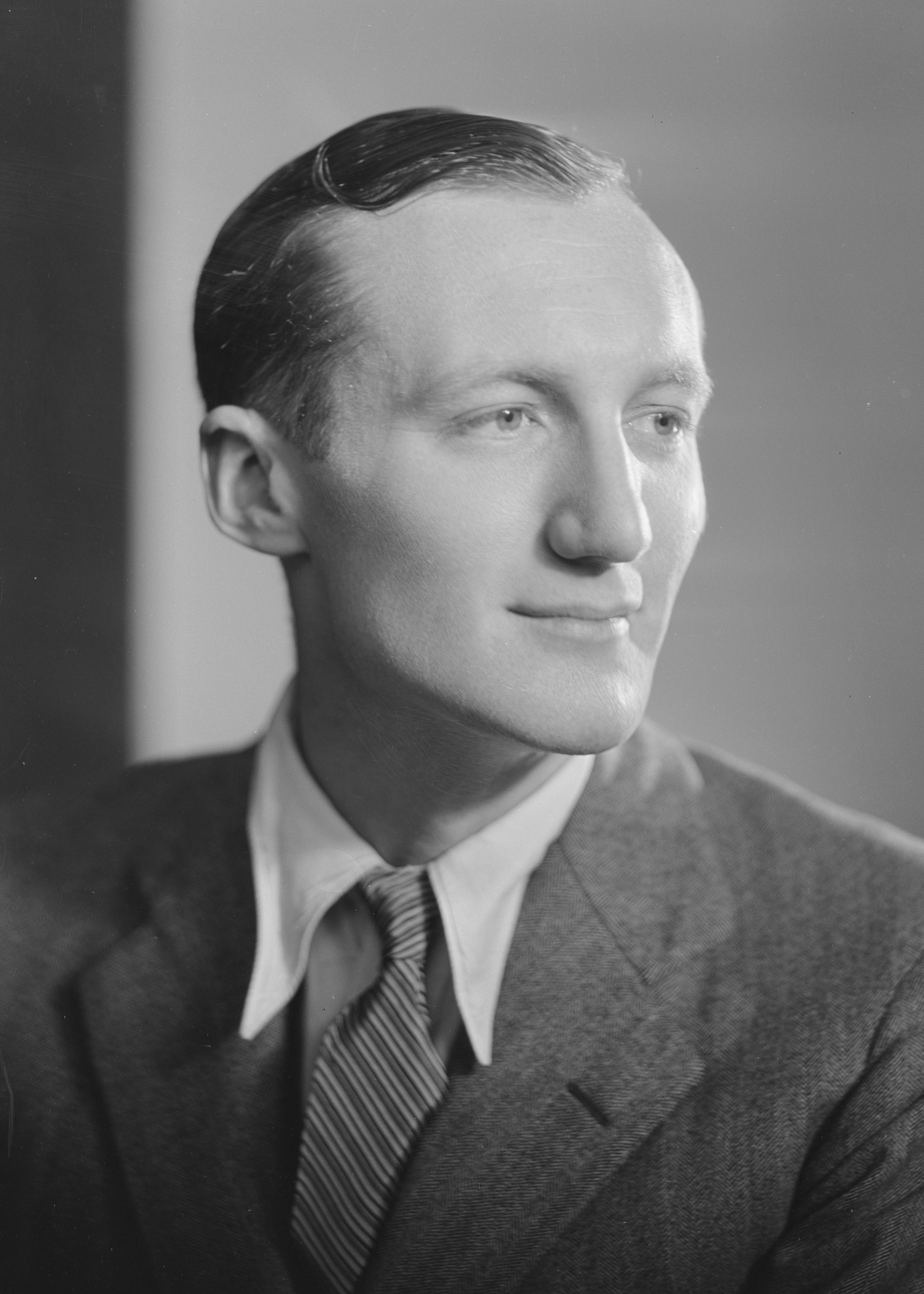
- Staveley in September, 1935
- Born: 30 August 1914 Hokitika, New Zealand
- Died: 14 May 2006 (aged 91) Auckland, New Zealand
- Occupation: Pathologist, Haematologist
- Education: Timaru Boys' High School
- Notable awards: Knight Commander of the Most Excellent Order of the British Empire (KBE); Military Cross (MC); New Zealand War Service Medal
- Spouse: Elvira, Lady Staveley (née Wycherley) (m. 1940; died 1992)
- Relatives: Camille Malfroy (uncle); Tessa Duder (daughter)

Sir John Malfroy Staveley KBE MC (30 August 1914 – 14 May 2006) was a New Zealand haematologist, pathologist, and a pioneer in the field of blood transfusion services.

== Early life and education ==
Staveley was born on 30 August 1914 in Hokitika, New Zealand. He was known as Jock rather than John. He attended Timaru Boys' High School before studying medicine at the University of Otago, where he graduated with an MBChb in 1938.

== Career ==
After graduation Staveley worked at Auckland Hospital before enlisting with the New Zealand Medical Corps 6 Field Ambulance in 1940. He served in Greece and North Africa in the Field Transfusion Unit and in the No. 2 New Zealand General Hospital in England. His experiences of the efficacy of giving blood transfusions in the field and combating malaria in Syria in World War II laid the foundation for his interest in blood transfusion.

After the war and postgraduate study in England and Scotland, he returned to Auckland Hospital, setting up blood banks to provide blood and blood products, which were needed due to the expansion of surgical procedures such as those at Green Lane Hospital's cardio-thoracic surgical unit.

He established the Auckland Blood Transfusion Service, which opened in 1968; this would become the New Zealand Blood Service. He retired in 1976. With Golan Maaka, he researched the blood groups of Māori, collecting samples from Ngāi Tūhoe.

== Personal ==
In 1940, Staveley married cellist Elvira Cleofe Wycherley, and the couple had two children: a daughter, the author Tessa Duder, and a son, John Staveley. He died at his home in Auckland on 14 May 2006.

== Honours and awards ==
Staveley was awarded the Military Cross on the 19 March 1942 for his gallant and distinguished service as a medical officer in the Middle East. In addition, he was awarded a War Medal (1939–1945).

In the 1972 Birthday Honours Staveley was appointed an Officer of the Order of the British Empire for valuable services to medicine. He was promoted to Knight Commander of the Order of the British Empire for services to New Zealand blood transfusion services in the 1980 New Year Honours.

== Legacy ==
In 2009, three years after his death, the then New Zealand Governor-General, Sir Anand Satyanand, opened the Sir John Staveley Library at the Auckland offices of the New Zealand Blood Service, named in Staveley's honour.

== Selected publications ==
- Staveley, J. M. 'Blood transfusion in the Army : its application to civil practice.' New Zealand Medical Journal: Vol. Aug 1946; v.45 n.248 (pp. 358–360).
- Douglas, R., & Staveley, J. M. 'Haptoglobins in Tongans (Polynesia).' New Zealand Medical Journal: Vol. Aug 1960; v.59 n.336 (pp. 391–392).
- Staveley, J. M., & Douglas, R. 'Transferrins in Tongans (Polynesia).' New Zealand Medical Journal: Vol. Nov 1960; v.59 n.339 (pp. 546–547).
- Cotter, C. A., Staveley, J. M., & Thompson, H. R. 'ABO and Rh (D) blood groups and cancer of the stomach in Auckland.' New Zealand Medical Journal: Vol. Aug 1961; v.60 n.348 (pp. 372–374).
