= Tessa Duder =

New Zealand author and former swimmer

Tessa Duder CNZM OBE
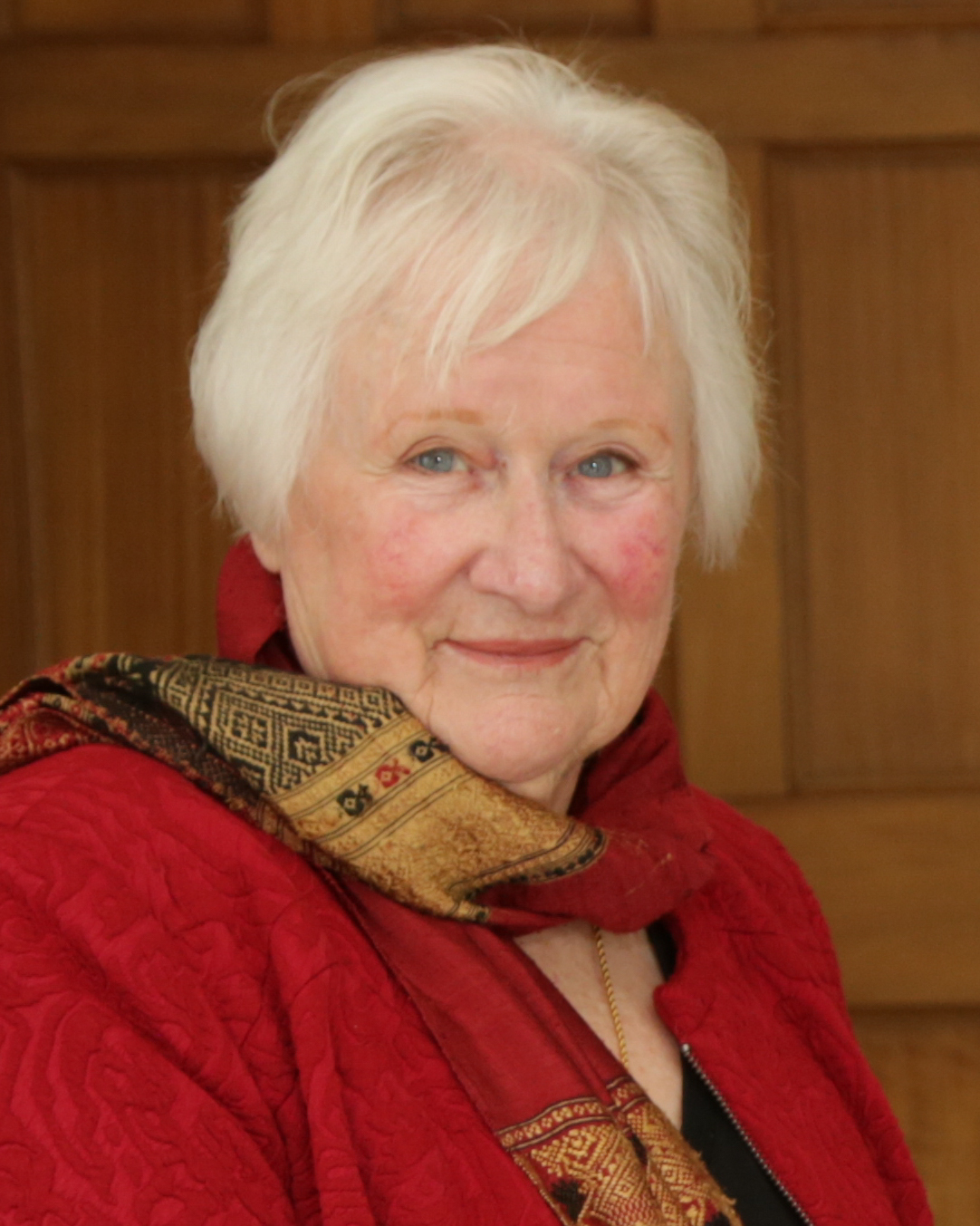
- Duder in 2020
- Born: Tessa Staveley; 13 November 1940 (age 86); Auckland, New Zealand
- Education: Diocesan School for Girls (Auckland)
- Occupations: Writer; Children's author
- Years active: 1979–present
- Office: Vice Patron of the Spirit of Adventure Trust (2021-present) President of the New Zealand Society of Authors (1996-1998)
- Spouses: John Duder (m. 1964; div. 1994) Barry Thompson (m. 2001; div. 2012)
- Children: 4
- Relatives: Sir John Staveley (father); Camille Malfroy (great-uncle); William Wycherley (distant relative); Albert Duder (grandfather-in-law)
- Awards: Officer of the Order of the British Empire (1994); Companion of the New Zealand Order of Merit (2020)
- Sports career
- Country: New Zealand
- Sport: Swimming

Sports achievements and titles
- National finals: 110 yd butterfly champion (1958, 1959); Individual medley champion (1957, 1958, 1959)
Medal record
Women's swimming
Representing New Zealand
British Empire and Commonwealth Games
| Silver medal – second place | 1958 Cardiff | 110 yards butterfly |

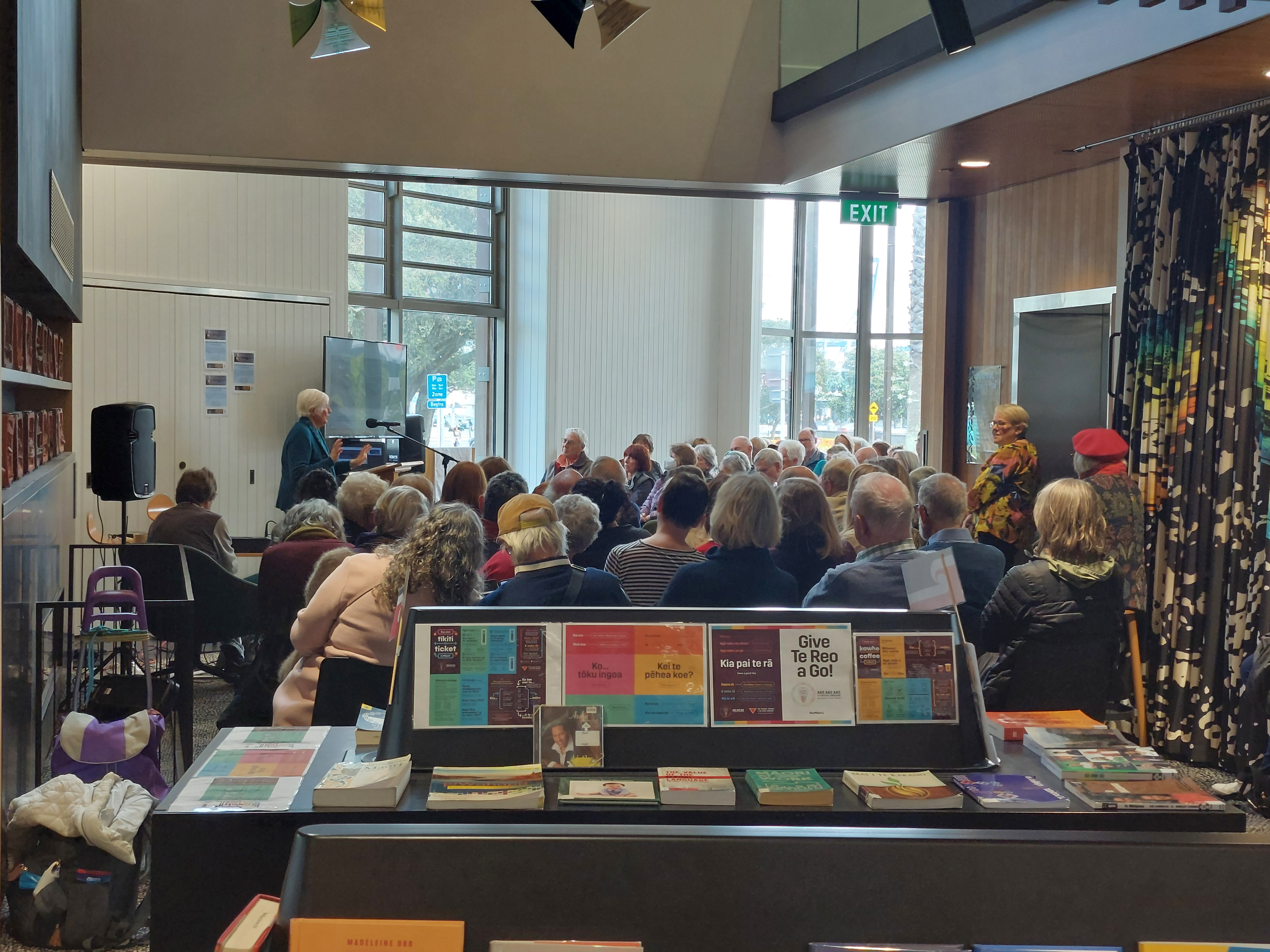
Tessa Duder giving a talk in Devonport Library, Auckland, 2024.

Tessa Duder CNZM OBE (née Staveley, born 13 November 1940) is a New Zealand author of novels for young people, short stories, plays and non-fiction, and a former swimmer who won a silver medal for her country at the 1958 British Empire and Commonwealth Games. As a writer, she is primarily known for her Alex quartet and long-term advocacy for New Zealand children's literature; the annual Storylines Tessa Duder Award for unpublished young adult fiction is named in her honour. As an editor, she has also published a number of anthologies.

In 2020 she received the Prime Minister's Award for Literary Achievement in acknowledgement of her significant contributions to New Zealand fiction.

== Early life and family ==
Duder was born Tessa Staveley in Auckland on 13 November 1940, the daughter of Sir John Staveley, a doctor and pioneer of blood transfusion in New Zealand who was later knighted, and Elvira, Lady Staveley (née Wycherley), a cellist. Her great-grandparents were from Livorno, Italy. She has a younger brother, John and was educated at Diocesan School for Girls in Auckland, and went on to study at Auckland University College in 1958, later returning to the University of Auckland between 1982 and 1984.

After leaving school, Staveley worked as a journalist for the Auckland Star from 1959 to 1964, before travelling to Europe and working for the Daily Express in London between 1964 and 1966. She married John Duder in 1964, and the couple went on to have four daughters. Following the birth of her first child, Duder was a full-time mother for seven years, much of it spent in Pakistan. She returned to Auckland in 1972, where she reentered the workforce as a pianist.

The fictional boat Aratika in Duder's first novel Night Race to Kawau was based on her then-husband John's family yacht, the Archibald Logan designed keel cutter Spray II.

== Swimming ==
As a teenager, Staveley competed in the butterfly and medley swimming events, becoming a national record holder in both events during 1958–59. She won the New Zealand national 110 yards butterfly title in 1957 and 1958, and the national individual medley championship in 1957, 1958, and 1959.

At the 1958 British Empire and Commonwealth Games in Cardiff, Staveley won the silver medal in the 110 yards butterfly, recording a time of 1:14.4 in the final. She was also a member of the New Zealand women's 4 x 110 yards medley relay team, alongside Philippa Gould, Kay Sawyers, and Jennifer Hunter, that finished in fourth place.

Staveley was named New Zealand Swimmer of the Year in 1959.

== Writing and career ==
Duder began writing fiction in 1977. Her first novel Night Race to Kawau was published by Oxford University Press in 1982. Her most successful works are the Alex quartet of novels (Alex, Alex in Winter, Alessandra: Alex in Rome and Songs for Alex) which build upon her own childhood experiences by following a teenage competitive swimmer with Olympic ambitions. The series won three New Zealand Children's Book of the Year awards and three Esther Glen medals. Alex has been translated into five languages and was for many years Penguin New Zealand's best selling work of fiction. Alex was adapted into the 1993 film of the same name. The film premiere of Alex was attended by longtime friend and then Governor-General Dame Catherine Tizard.

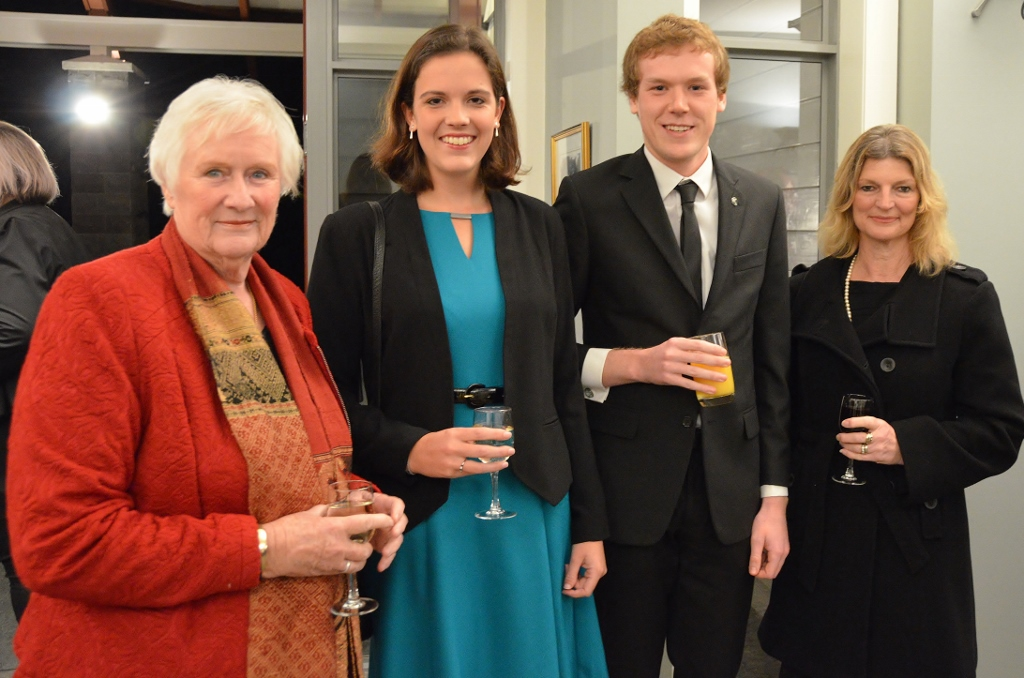
Duder (far left) at a dinner hosted by Governor-General Sir Jerry Mateparae, on 5 June 2015.

Duder's later work includes plays, anthologies and biographies. The Tiggie Tompson Show won the 2000 New Zealand Post Senior Fiction Award for young adult fiction. Her first work for adults, a short story collection Is She Still Alive? reached number two on New Zealand bestseller lists in 2008.

Duder is a past president of the NZ Society of Authors (PEN NZ Inc). In 1990, she was awarded the New Zealand 1990 Commemoration Medal. She was appointed an Officer of the Order of the British Empire in the 1994 New Year Honours, for services to literature, and has been awarded the Storylines Margaret Mahy Medal. In recognition of her contribution to children's literature, Storylines established the Storylines Tessa Duder Award, awarded annually to an unpublished manuscript for young adult fiction. She is a trustee of the Storylines Children's Literature Charitable Trust of New Zealand, and a former trustee of the Spirit of Adventure Trust which operates the tall ship Spirit of New Zealand. In 1991, she was the University of Waikato's first writer-in-residence. In 2003, she won the Katherine Mansfield fellowship to work for a year in Menton, France, and in 2007 she travelled to Antarctica under the Artists to Antarctica programme. She was awarded an honorary doctorate by the University of Waikato in 2009. In November 2011, Duder was listed among 19 New Zealand writers supporting the Keep MMP campaign during the 2011 New Zealand voting system referendum. In 2013, she participated in the first Tall Ships Regatta from Sydney to Auckland, sailing aboard Spirit of New Zealand for the eight-day race crossing from Sydney to Opua.

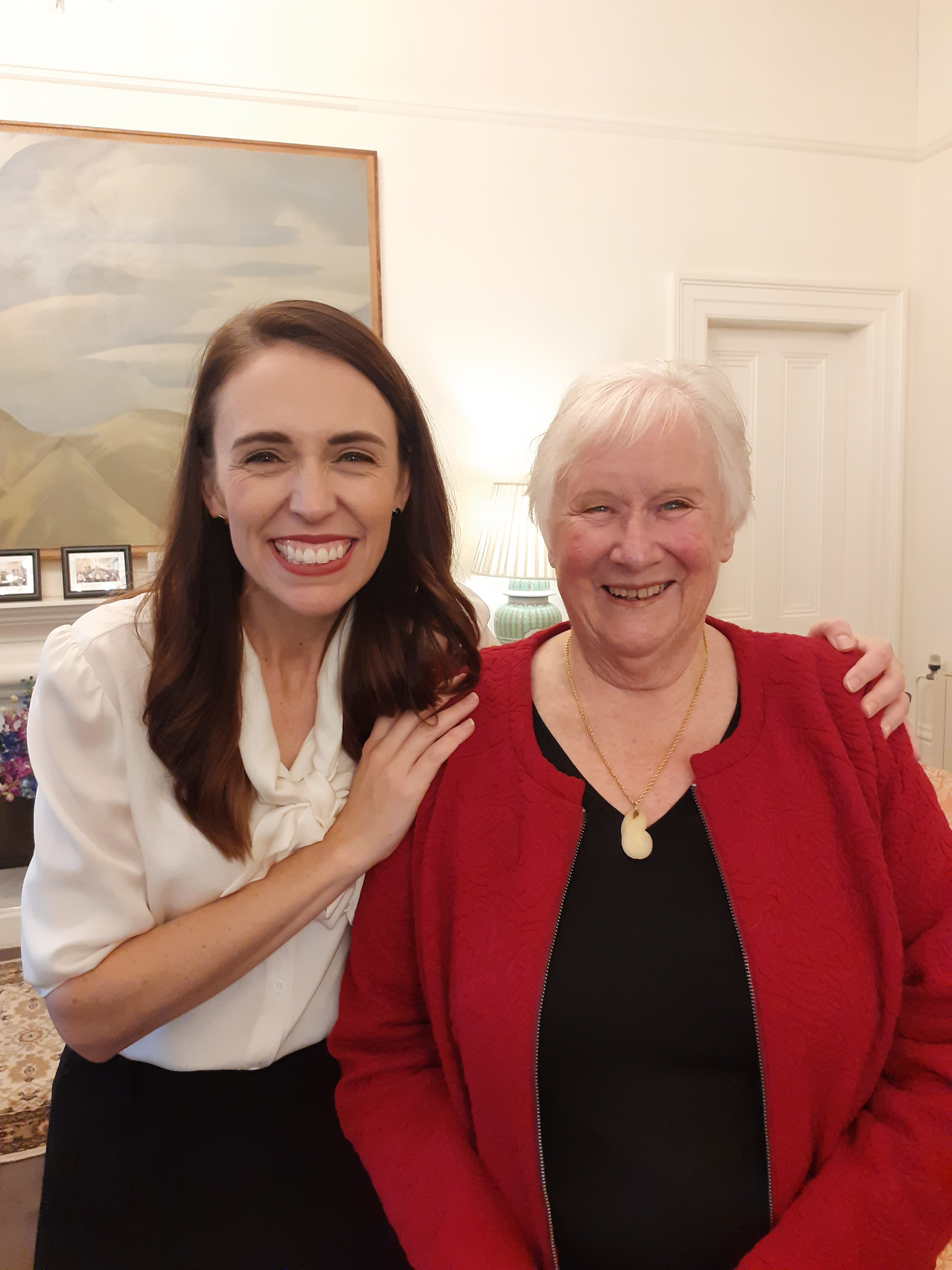
Duder (right) with Prime Minister Jacinda Ardern, on 23 March 2021.

In the 2020 Queen's Birthday Honours, Duder was appointed a Companion of the New Zealand Order of Merit, for services to literature. Her investiture by Governor-General Dame Patsy Reddy took place at Government House, Auckland, on 23 September 2020.

In the same year she received the Prime Minister's Award for Literary Achievement in fiction, receiving $60,000 in recognition of her significant contributions to New Zealand literature. In 2021, she received the award from Prime Minister Jacinda Ardern at a private ceremony held at Premier House alongside Sir Tīmoti Kāretu and Jenny Bornholdt.

In 2022, Duder was made President of Honour of the New Zealand Society of Authors, a post she held for two years.

In July 2024, Duder was interviewed by 1News about the age of political leaders following the first 2024 United States presidential debate. She opposed a mandatory age limit for political leaders, while arguing that age could bring experience, historical perspective and compassion, and that long-serving political leaders should recognise when it was time to hand over power.

In 2025, her novel The Sparrow was discussed on RNZ's Bookmarks with Jesse Mulligan, with former Prime Minister Chris Hipkins describing the novel as “a really interesting insight into what was a defining period of New Zealand history”.

She is the vice patron of the Spirit of Adventure Trust.

Duder lives on Auckland's North Shore.

== Bibliography ==
Novels for young people:

- Night Race to Kawau (1982)
- Jellybean (1985)
- Alex (1987) (US title: In Lane Three, Alex Archer)
- Alex in Winter (1989)
- Alessandra – Alex in Rome (1991)
- Songs for Alex (1992)
- Mercury Beach (1997)
- The Tiggie Tompson Show (1999)
- Hot Mail (2000)
- Tiggie Tompson, All at Sea (2001)
- Tiggie Tompson's Longest Journey (2003)
- The Sparrow (2023)

Short stories and Anthologies for children and young adults:

- Personal Best (1997)
- A Book of Pacific Lullabies (2001)
- Down to the Sea Again (2005)
- Too Close to the Wind and other stories (2006)
- "The Whistle Blower", short story in Dare and Double Dare – 30 New Zealand Sporty Stories (2006)
- "Taking Flight", short story in You’re the Best! – stories about friendship (2007)
- Out on the Water: Twelve Tales from the Sea (2014)

Short stories for adults:

- Seduced by the Sea — more stories from seafaring Kiwis (2002)
- Is She Still Alive? (2008)

Plays:

- The Runaway (1993) – one-act play for young actors about Joan of Arc
- The Warrior Virgin (1996)

Non-fiction:

- Kawau – the Governor's Gift (1981)
- The Book of Auckland (1985)
- Spirit of Adventure: the Story of New Zealand's sail training ship (1985) – with Captain Barry Thompson and Clifford Hawkins
- Waitemata – Auckland's Harbour of Sails (1989)
- Journey to Olympia – the story of the Ancient Olympics (1992)
- The Making of Alex: the movie (1993)
- In Search of Elisa Marchetti — a writer's search for her Italian family (2002)
- Margaret Mahy – a writer's life (2005)
- The Word Witch – the magical verse of Margaret Mahy (editor) – (2011)
- The Story of Sir Peter Blake (2012)
- Sarah Mathew: Explorer, Journalist and Auckland's 'First Lady' (2015)
- First Map: How James Cook Charted Aotearoa New Zealand (2019)

Films:

- Alex (film) – Directed by Megan Simpson, starring: Lauren Jackson, Chris Haywood, and Josh Picker (1992)

TV Shows:

- Shortland Street – Played the role of Colleen Dunster in 11 episodes of Season 6 (1997)
