= Gareth Ward (disambiguation) =

Gareth Ward may refer to:

- Gareth Ward, Australian politician
- Gareth Ward (author), New Zealand author
