= Tessa Duder Award =

New Zealand fiction literature award for young adults

The Storylines Tessa Duder Award is a New Zealand award made to the author of a work of fiction for young adults aged 13 and above.

== History ==
The Tessa Duder Award (officially known as the Storylines Tessa Duder Award) first began in 2010, in partnership with HarperCollins Publishers. It is now sponsored by Walker Books Australia. The award is named after New Zealand writer Tessa Duder in recognition of her outstanding contribution to children's literature, both as a writer and as a supporter and promoter of children's books and publishing.

The award comes with a cash prize and the offer of publication.

The award is presented at the Storylines Margaret Mahy Awards Day together with the Margaret Mahy Award and the announcement of the winners of the Tom Fitzgibbon Award, Joy Cowley Award and the Gaelyn Gordon Award for a Much-Loved Book. This event is held in Auckland on the weekend closest to 2 April, International Children’s Book Day (and the birthday of Hans Christian Andersen).

== Eligibility and conditions ==
- The award is open to all New Zealand writers, published and unpublished
- The award is made biennially; however, if no entry is judged to be of publishable standard, no award is made that year
- Manuscripts are submitted by the end of October; the award is announced the following March, and the winning manuscript is published the following year.

== List of winners by year ==
2011: Hugh Brown; manuscript published as Reach

Finalist in New Zealand Post Children’s Book Awards 2013

2012: Rachel Stedman; manuscript published as A Necklace of Souls

Winner of Best First Book in New Zealand Post Book Awards for Children and Young Adults 2014

2013: No award

2015: No award

2016: Gareth Ward; manuscript entitled The Sin Chronicles: New Blood, published as The Traitor and the Thief

Finalist in New Zealand Post Book Awards for Children and Young Adults 2018

2018: Tina Shaw; manuscript entitled Ursa

2020: Cristina Sanders; manuscript entitled Displaced

2022: Leonie Agnew; manuscript published as The Impossible Story of Hannah Kemp

2024: Kiri Lightfoot; manuscript published as Bear

2026: Amy Martin; manuscript titled Ten Thousand Pitches

== See also ==
- List of New Zealand literary awards
