= Keith Gudsell =

New Zealand-born Australian rugby player

- Born: Keith Eric Gudsell; 19 October 1924 Whanganui, New Zealand
- Died: 7 July 2007 (aged 82) Hamilton, New Zealand
- Height: 1.75 m (5 ft 9 in)
- Weight: 82 kg (181 lb)
- School: Wanganui Technical College
- University: Massey Agricultural College; University of Sydney
- Occupation(s): Veterinarian; Bloodstock agent

Rugby union career
- Position: Second five eighth, centre
Provincial / State sides
Years	Team	Apps	(Points)
- Manawatu
- Wanganui
- New South Wales
1956	Waikato	3	
International career
Years	Team	Apps	(Points)
1945, 1947	NZ Universities		
1949	New Zealand	0	(0)
1951	Australian Universities		
1951	Australia	3	(0)

Keith Eric Gudsell (19 October 1924 – 7 July 2007) was a New Zealand rugby union footballer who played for both the country of his birth and Australia. A midfield back, Gudsell represented Manawatu, Wanganui and Waikato at a provincial level in New Zealand, and New South Wales at state level in Australia. He was a member of the New Zealand national side, the All Blacks, on their 1949 tour of South Africa, appearing in six matches but no internationals. Having graduated with a Bachelor of Agricultural Science from Massey Agricultural College in 1949, Gudsell then studied veterinary science at the University of Sydney, graduating in 1954. During this time he played three tests for Australia against the touring All Blacks in 1951.
