= Buff Milner =

- Born: Henare Pawhara Milner; 12 February 1946 Tokomaru Bay, New Zealand
- Died: 2 March 1996 (aged 50) London, United Kingdom
- Height: 1.79 m (5 ft 10 in)
- Weight: 78 kg (172 lb)
- School: Tokomaru Bay District High School
- Notable relative: Nehe Milner-Skudder (cousin)
- Occupation: Soldier

Rugby union career
- Position: Utility back
Provincial / State sides
Years	Team	Apps	(Points)
1963–65	East Coast		
1966–72	Wanganui	35	
1972–78	Counties	41	(88)
International career
Years	Team	Apps	(Points)
1970	New Zealand	1	(0)
1971–75	New Zealand Māori	14	(6)

Henare Pawhara "Buff" Milner (12 February 1946 – 2 March 1996) was a New Zealand rugby union player. A utility back, Milner represented East Coast, Wanganui, and Counties at a provincial level, and was a member of the New Zealand national side, the All Blacks, in 1970. He played 16 matches for the All Blacks on their tour of South Africa that year, including one international. A professional soldier, Milner died suddenly in 1996 in the United Kingdom while there on an army course.

He was the cousin of Nehe Milner-Skudder, who made his All Black debut in 2015.
