= Waate Potaka =

NZ international rugby union player

- Born: Waate Pene Potaka c. 1903 Taihape, New Zealand
- Died: 3 November 1967 Taihape, New Zealand
- School: Te Aute College

Rugby union career
- Position: Utility back
Amateur team(s)
Years	Team	Apps	(Points)
1918, 20, 23, 25–26	Rata		
1930	Aotea		
1931	Ratana		
Provincial / State sides
Years	Team	Apps	(Points)
1918, 20, 23, 25–26, 30–31	Wanganui	25	
International career
Years	Team	Apps	(Points)
1923	New Zealand	2	(3)
- Māori All Blacks

Waate "Pat" Pene Potaka (c.1903 – 3 November 1967) was a New Zealand rugby union player who represented the All Blacks in 1923 and the Māori All Blacks between 1922 and 1927. He was regarded as a utility back, as he played in every back position throughout his career.

Although his birth name was Waate, Potaka was generally known as Pat.

He was born in Taihape, but was educated at Te Aute College in the Hawke's Bay region.

== Career ==
=== Provincial ===
He initially played as a halfback, but soon found himself playing as a fly half and fullback.

For the majority of his career Potaka played for the Rata club. He had stints at the Aotea and Ratana clubs towards the end of his career.

He totalled 25 games for the Wanganui union.

=== All Blacks ===
After playing in the 1923 North against South Island match, Potaka gained his only two appearances for the All Blacks, both of which were against New South Wales. The first was played in Dunedin and the second in Christchurch where he came on as a substitute onto the wing and then scored a try.

The next year in 1924 Potaka trialled to be selected for the team that would go on to be nicknamed The Invincibles. He was not selected.

=== Māori All Blacks ===
Potaka first played for the Māori All Blacks in 1922.

He was selected for the 1926–27 tour of New Zealand, Australia, Sri Lanka, Europe and Canada. He played in 18 matches on the great tour. Potaka mainly played in the centre position on the tour, but at times was used at fullback and five-eighths.

His total number of games for the Māori All Blacks was 50.
