= Sarah Mathew =

New Zealand diarist (c.1805 – 1890)

Sarah Louise Mathew (c. 1805? – 14 December 1890) was a New Zealand diarist. She was born in London, England, to Ann Constant Strange and Richard Mathew (1765–1839). She had two sisters and two brothers, including George Felton Mathew, a friend of the poet John Keats. Her exact birth date is unknown, but she was baptised in 1805. On 21 January 1832 she married her cousin, Felton Mathew in Sydney, Australia. All their children were stillborn. Her husband was New Zealand's first Surveyor General.

== Bibliography ==
- Duder, Tessa (2015). Sarah Mathew: Explorer, Journalist and Auckland's 'First Lady'. David Ling Publishing Limited. ISBN 978-1-927305-07-2.
- Reid, Hilary F (1990). "Mathew, Sarah Louise 1805?–1890". Te Ara: The Encyclopedia of New Zealand. Manatū Taonga Ministry for Culture and Heritage. (see The Encyclopedia of New Zealand)
- Mathew, Peggy. "Mathew Ancestors".
