= John Blair (rugby union) =

- Born: John Alexander Blair c.1871 Wanganui, New Zealand
- Died: 12 April 1911 Porirua, Wellington, New Zealand
- Weight: 84 kg (185 lb)
- School: Wanganui Collegiate

Rugby union career
- Position: Hooker
Amateur team(s)
| Years | Team | Apps | (Points) |
| 1891, 93–1900 | Kaierau | | |
Provincial / State sides
| Years | Team | Apps | (Points) |
| 1891, 93–1900 | Wanganui | | |
International career
| Years | Team | Apps | (Points) |
| 1897 | New Zealand | 9 | (5) |

John Alexander Blair (c.1871 – 12 April 1911) was a New Zealand rugby union player who represented the All Blacks in 1897. His position of choice was hooker. Blair did not play in any test matches as New Zealand did not play their first until 1903.

Blair was educated at Wanganui Collegiate where he was a member of the 1st XV in 1886.

== Career ==
Blair was the first player from Wanganui to represent his country. Out of the Kaierau club, Blair played many times for the provincial side.

He played in the inaugural North against South Island match in 1897. Based on this performance Blair was selected for the All Blacks to go on their tour to Australia that same year.

He played in eight of the ten matches on the tour, scoring one try as well as a conversion.

He also played in the game against Auckland once they returned.

Blair continued playing for Wanganui until 1900.

== Family ==
His father, Duncan, also played rugby union. His mother's name was Agnes.

He had at least five sisters and two brothers.
