= George Skudder =

New Zealand rugby union player (1948–2021)

- Born: George Rupuha Skudder; 10 February 1948 Te Puke, New Zealand
- Died: 8 May 2021 (aged 73) Te Puke, New Zealand
- Height: 1.79 m (5 ft 10 in)
- Weight: 82 kg (181 lb)
- School: Te Aute College
- University: Hamilton Teachers' College
- Notable relative(s): Nehe Milner-Skudder (nephew); Ben Atiga (nephew); Tanerau Latimer (nephew)

Rugby union career
- Position: Wing
Provincial / State sides
Years	Team	Apps	(Points)
1968–73	Waikato	37	
International career
Years	Team	Apps	(Points)
1968–73	New Zealand Māori		
1969–73	New Zealand	1	(3)

George Rupuha Skudder (10 February 1948 – 8 May 2021) was a New Zealand rugby union player. A wing three-quarter, Skudder represented Waikato at a provincial level, and was a member of the New Zealand national side, the All Blacks, from 1969 to 1973. He played 14 matches for the All Blacks including one international, against the touring Welsh side in 1969.

Skudder died on 8 May 2021, aged 73. He was the uncle of All Blacks Nehe Milner-Skudder, Ben Atiga, and Tanerau Latimer.
