= Tina Shaw =

New Zealand author (born 1961)

- Born: 1961 (age 64–65); Auckland, New Zealand
- Website: Official website

Tina Shaw (born 1961) is a New Zealand author.

Shaw was born in 1961, in Auckland, New Zealand and grew up in Matangi and Christchurch.

== Works ==
Novels published by Shaw include:

- Birdie (1996)
- Dreams of America (1997)
- City of Reeds (2000)
- Paradise (2002)
- The Black Madonna (2005, Penguin)
- The Children's Pond (2014, Pointer Press Ltd)
- Make a Hard Fist (2017, OneTree House)
- Ephemera (2020, Cloud Ink Press)

She edited the travel writing collection, A Passion for Travel (1998) and with Jack Ross, the anthology Myths of the 21st Century (Reed, 2006).

=== Young adult fiction ===
- About Griffen’s Heart (2009, Longacre)
- Ursa (2019, Walker Books)

=== Children's fiction ===
- Brenda's Planetary Holiday (2006)
- Fluff Helps Out (Puffin, 2006)
- Into the Hinterland (2008, Pearson Education)
- Dogs of the Hinterland (2008, Pearson Education)
- Koevasi (2008, Pearson Education)

== Awards ==
Shaw received the 1999 Grimshaw Sargeson Fellowship and the Creative New Zealand 2001 Berlin Writers Residency. She was the 2005 writer in residence at the University of Waikato.

In 2003, her story 'Coarse Fishing' was runner-up in the Sunday-Star Times Short Story Competition.

About Griffen’s Heart (2009) was listed as a 2010 Notable Young Adult Fiction Book by Storylines and was shortlisted in the 2010 LIANZA Children and Young Adult Book Awards.

The Children's Pond (2014) was shortlisted for the 2015 Ngaio Marsh Award for Best Crime Novel.

In 2018, Shaw won the Tessa Duder Award for her manuscript Ursa. She won the 2023 Michael Gifkins Prize for her unpublished manuscript, A House Built on Sand, to be published by Text Publishing.
