= Camille Malfroy =

New Zealand mayor (1839–1897)

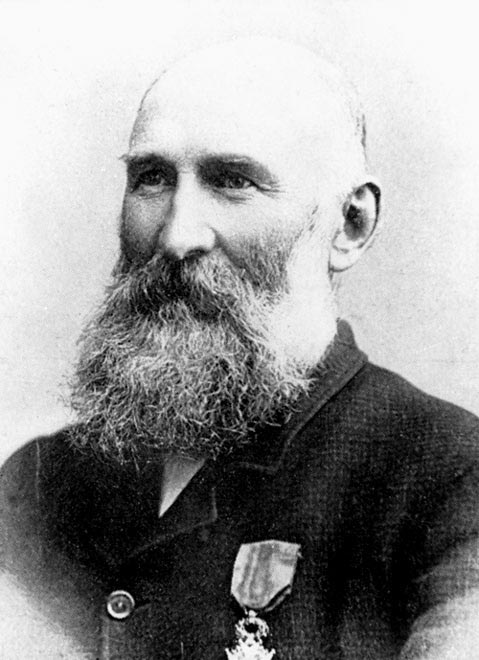
- Camille Malfroy

1st Mayor of Ross
- In office 1878–1878
- Succeeded by: Joseph Grimmond
- In office 1884–1885
- Preceded by: John Hunt Currie
- Succeeded by: Rudolph Hirter

Personal details
- Born: Jean Michel Camille Malfroy; 1839 Macornay, France
- Died: 6 January 1897 (aged 57–58) Rotorua, New Zealand
- Relatives: John Staveley (great nephew)

Jean Michel Camille Malfroy (23 March 1839 – 6 January 1897) was a New Zealand engineer and local politician. He was born in Macornay, France on 23 March 1839.

Malfroy arrived in New Zealand via the Victorian goldfields in the 1860s. Naturalised on 7 May 1878, he was elected as the first mayor of Ross Borough on the West Coast of the South Island. He served as a mining engineer on the West Coast until appointment as Crown Lands Department engineer in charge of works in Rotorua in 1886. He was a prominent local politician and developer of Rotorua tourist attractions. He also served as Head of New Zealand exhibit at the 1889 Exposition Universelle in Paris and was awarded the Chevalier of the Légion d’honneur by the French government on 30 October 1889. He died in Rotorua on 6 January 1897.
