= Ross Borough =

Coordinates: 42°53′45″S 170°48′51″E

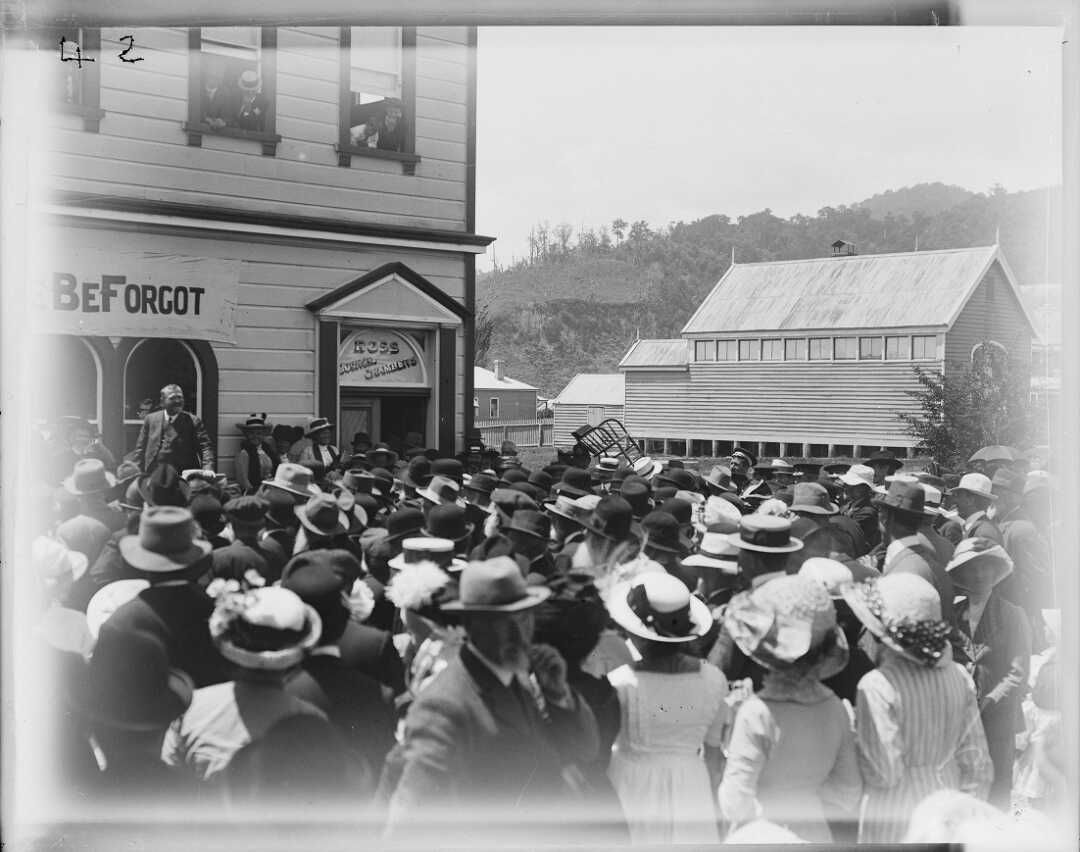
Public gathering outside the Ross Borough Council chambers (1910s)

The Ross Borough was the borough council covering the town of Ross, New Zealand and the nearby locality Donoghues, between 1878 and 1972, when Ross Borough was merged back into Westland County.

== History ==
The area was first occupied by white settlers in 1865 after the discovery of gold in the Tōtara River and in Jones Creek. Ross was initially administered by the Canterbury Provincial Council based in Christchurch, and then by the successor government agency Westland County from 1868 to 1873, which was succeeded by Westland Province from 1873 to 1876. With the abolition of the provincial government system, the area came under the control of Westland County; equal in name to the organisation from 1873 but with the functions of a county council as opposed to provincial government. In September 1877, some residents of Ross met "to take into consideration the advisability of forming Ross into a municipality"; at the time the area was part of Westland County. The first step was to form a committee that would decide on the boundaries of such a borough. The meeting also passed a unanimous decision to petition the governor—George Phipps, 2nd Marquess of Normanby—to declare Ross a municipality and the required number of signatures was collected. On 31 December 1877, John Benjamin Lopas (acting on behalf of the committee) received a telegram from the government that the borough had been approved and that he had been appointed returning officer and clerk. Three candidates stood for election as mayor of Ross, and Camille Malfroy beat Joseph Grimmond with 79 votes to 75, with William Lockington coming a distant third.

The borough council took over the responsibilities of the Totara Road Board. The borough covered an area of four square miles (10 km^{2}).

In 1972, the borough was merged back into Westland County.

== List of mayors ==
Between 1878 and 1982, Ross had 16 mayors. The following is a complete list:

	Name	Portrait	Term of office
1	Camille Malfroy		1878
2	Joseph Grimmond		1878–1881
3	Rudolph Hirter		1881–1883
4	John Hunt Currie		1883–1884
(1)	Camille Malfroy		1884–1885
(3)	Rudolph Hirter		1885–1886
(2)	Joseph Grimmond		1886–1887
(4)	John Hunt Currie		1887–1888
(2)	Joseph Grimmond		1888–1890
5	P. Keller		1890–1892
(2)	Joseph Grimmond		1892–1893
(4)	John Hunt Currie		1893–1897
6	David Yorwarth		1897–1901
(2)	Joseph Grimmond		1901–1905
7	Thomas Wanless Bruce		1905–1914
(2)	Joseph Grimmond		1914–1919
8	S. P. Evans		1919–1929
9	Hermann Osmers		1929–1931
10	John Murdoch		1931–1933
(9)	Hermann Osmers		1933–1935
11	J. J. Rea		1935
(10)	John Murdoch		1935–1938
12	Kenneth Ogilvie May		1938–1947
13	Alfred Norman Gilmore		1947–1952
14	Allan Francis Laing		1952–1956
–	John Holmes (acting)		1956
15	Patrick J. Minehan		1956–1962
16	Stanley Scott		1962–1972
