= Spirit of New Zealand =

Youth training ship

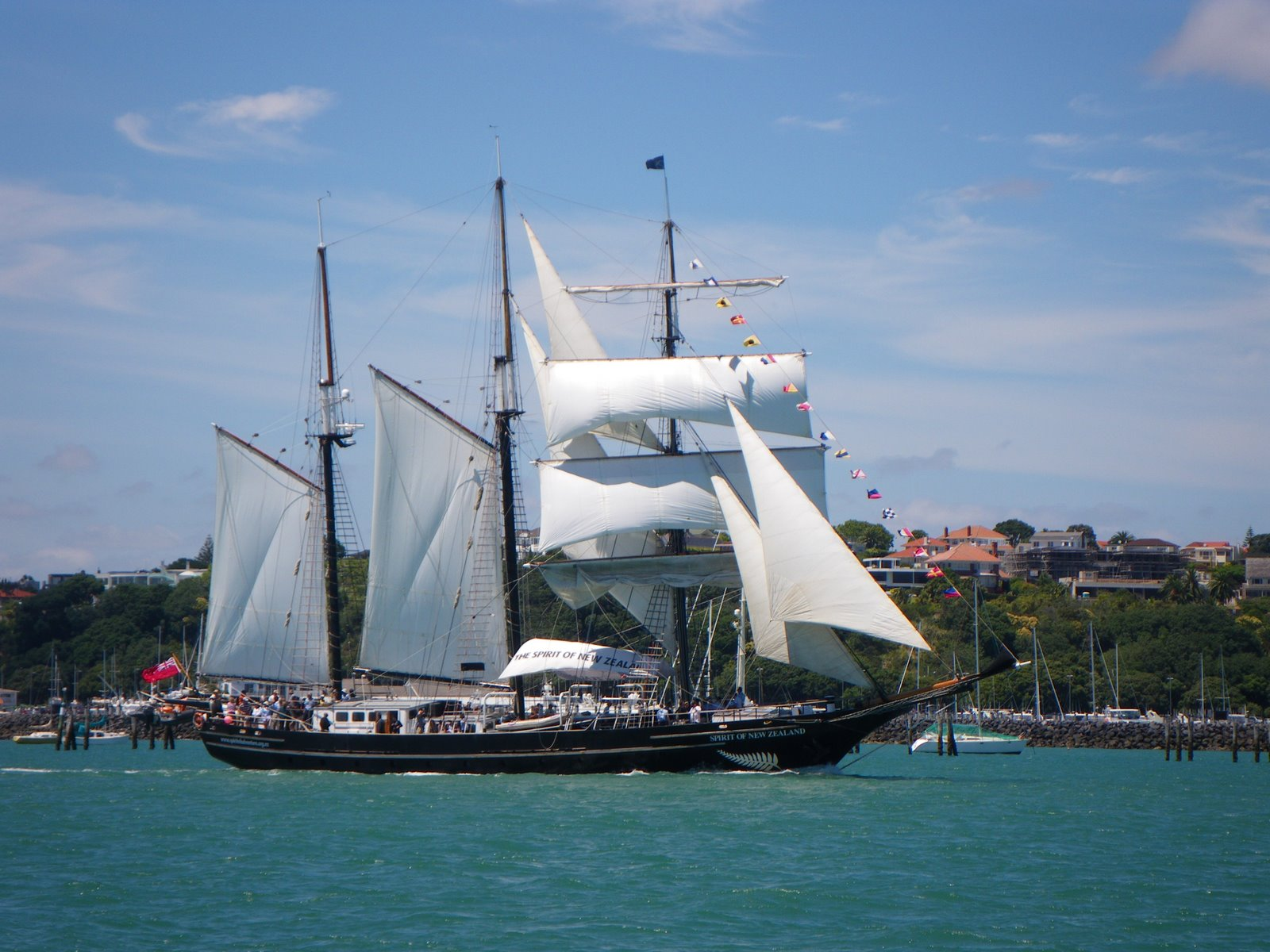
- Spirit of New Zealand under sail, January 2008

History

New Zealand
- Name: Spirit of New Zealand
- Owner: Spirit of Adventure Trust
- Builder: Thackwray Yachts Limited and Spirit of Adventure Trust
- Launched: 1986
- Identification: IMO number: 8975603; MMSI number: 512201000; Callsign: ZMSV
- Status: Active

General characteristics
- Type: Sail Training Ship
- Displacement: 286 tons
- Length: 45.2 metres (148 ft) including bowsprit; 33.3 metres (109 ft) on deck
- Beam: 9.1 metres (30 ft)
- Draft: 4.0 metres (13.1 ft)
- Propulsion: Yanmar 6AYM 670HP (500kW)
- Sail plan: Barquentine, 14 sails, 724.3 square metres (7,796 sq ft)
- Complement: 40 trainees, 14 crew
- Notes: Design by: Ewbank, Brooke and Associates

The tall ship Spirit of New Zealand is a steel-hulled, three-masted barquentine from Auckland, New Zealand. It was purpose-built by the Spirit of Adventure Trust in 1986 for youth development. It is 42.5 m in total length and carries a maximum of 40 trainees and 14 crew on overnight voyages. The ship's home port is Auckland, and it spends most of its time sailing around the Hauraki Gulf. During the summer season, it often sails to the Marlborough Sounds and Nelson, at the top of the South Island.

The spirit of the project was derived from the sail training operations of the schooners "Sir Winston Churchill" and "Malcolm Miller" which were built for the organisation formerly known as the Sail Training Association (STA)

The ship is used for a year-round programme of youth development, consisting primarily of 10-day individual voyages for 16- to 18-year-olds and 5-day Spirit Trophy voyages for teams of 10 Year 10 students. Once a year, an Inspiration voyage for trainees with physical disabilities is run, as well as School Board of Trustees and Navy training voyages. In addition, adult day, weekend and coastal voyages are offered to paying members of the public. The ship is usually in dry-dock for refit in August and does not sail on Christmas Day.

== Design ==
Designed by Ted Ewbank and Don Brooke of Ewbank Brooke and Associates, and built in 1986 by Thackwray Yachts Limited and Spirit of Adventure Trust, the Spirit of New Zealand is a barquentine-rigged three-masted steel hull 33.3 m (109 ft) long, with an overall length of 45.2 m (148 ft) including the bowsprit, and a maximum width of 9.1 m (29.9 ft). She has a draft of about 4 m (13 ft) and a displacement of 286 tons. Under power, the Spirit of New Zealand can reach a top speed of 10 knots, and 14 knots under sail. A new engine installed in late 2010 is expected to increase the vessel's maximum speed.

The three steel masts are 28.7, 31.3, and 28.0 metres high and carry 14 sails totalling 724.3 m^{2} (7,965 ft^{2}). There are 3 jibs and 4 square sails on the foremast. The main and mizzen masts are gaff rigged, and both can carry a gaff-topsail. In addition, there are 3 staysails on the main mast.

The hull is painted black with the ship's name and the Trust's website painted in white at the bow and across the stern. In addition, a large silver fern is painted on either side of the bow beneath the name. A stainless steel rubbing strake runs the length of the vessel and circular port holes are visible above the waterline. A wooden rail runs around the edge of the entire deck.

The standard crew of the Spirit of New Zealand has varied during her lifetime, but in 2023 consisted of 1 master, 4 mates, 1 cook, 1 engineer, 4 volunteer watch assistants, 2 leading hands and 40 trainees. For day sail voyages, the ship is registered to carry significantly more passengers. The trainees are normally split 20 male and 20 female, and sleep in separate accommodation. A change to the male accommodation was made so that 6 of the bunks could be separated from the remainder, allowing voyages to sail with 26 females and 14 males. This change was made in response to frequently higher female applicants than male applicants.

== Operational history ==
On January 26 1988, she was in Sydney Harbour on Australia Day, alongside other tall ships, to take part in the reenactment of the First Fleet's arrival which marked the Australian Bicentenary.

In October 2013, the vessel was in Sydney, Australia as part of the tall ship fleet at the International Fleet Review 2013.
