= Gareth Ward (author) =

New Zealand bookseller and novelist

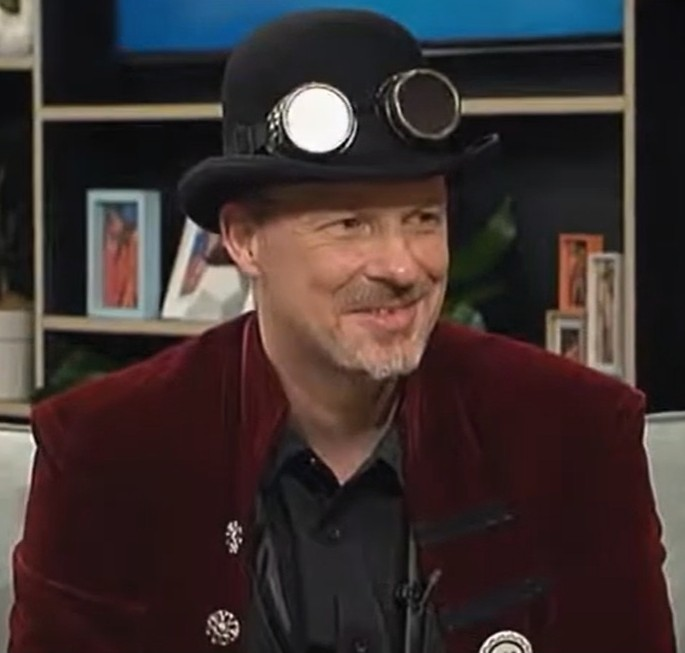
Ward in 2017

Gareth Ward is a New Zealand bookseller, novelist, magician and hypnotist.

Ward was born in Banbury, England. He attended the University of York where he gained a joint honours degree in biology and computer science. He was a British Royal Marine commando before becoming a police officer.

Ward's steampunk first novel, The Traitor and the Thief, won the 2016 Storylines Tessa Duder Award, the 2018 Sir Julius Vogel Award for Best Youth Novel, a 2018 Storylines Notable Book Award.

Ward and his wife Louise Ward, also a former UK police officer, own two Wardini Books stores in Hawke’s Bay, in Hastings and Napier. They won the Nielsen Bookshop of the Year 2020 in the Book Trade Industry Awards.

In 2023 they began writing a series of cosy murder mystery novels. In 2024, their first novel The Bookshop Detectives: Dead Girl Gone was the largest selling New Zealand novel. The novel won the Booksellers Choice Adult Award in 2025. The second novel, Bookshop Detectives 2: Tea and Cake and Death, was published in 2025, and the third, The Bookshop Detectives 3: Murder and Mojitos, was published in 2026. Their first two novels have been optioned by South Pacific Pictures.
