= James Rutherford (historian) =

New Zealand historian

- Born: 27 January 1906; Dunston, England
- Died: 11 April 1963 (aged 57); Auckland, New Zealand
- Education: University of Durham; University of Michigan
- Scientific career
- Fields: History
- Workplaces: University of Auckland

James Rutherford (27 January 1906 – 11 April 1963) was a professor and historian at the University of Auckland in New Zealand. Born in England, he gained a Master of Arts degree from the University of Durham and his doctorate from the University of Michigan. He was the chair of history at the University of Auckland from 1934 until his death in 1963.

== Early life ==
Born in Dunston, England, on 27 January 1906, James Rutherford was the son of Ralph Rutherford, a railway worker, and his wife Sarah née Gladstone. He was educated in the Newcastle region and after completing his schooling, attended the University of Durham. Graduating with a Master of Arts degree in history, he then went onto the United States having gained a scholarship for postgraduate study at the University of Michigan. His Doctor of Philosophy thesis covered the subject of the federal government in South Africa in the late nineteenth century.

== Academic career ==
Returning to England in 1928, Rutherford began his lecturing career at University College in Southampton where he remained until 1933. He then applied for the position of chair in history at the University of Auckland in New Zealand. Despite still being 27 and yet to be published, he was the successful candidate. Two local applicants, Bill Airey and John Beaglehole, were not favoured due to being considered radicals. In addition, the selection panel at the time favoured academics that were educated in Britain, seeing them as superior to those who had received degrees from New Zealand universities.

Rutherford arrived at Auckland in 1934 to take over responsibility for the history department with Airey as his deputy. Rutherford's lecturing style was well received by the younger students but he was unconsidered to be relatively unapproachable. His research focus was nineteenth century New Zealand history, and he published extensively. His most notable work was a lengthy biography of Sir George Grey, the former Governor of New Zealand.

During the Second World War, Rutherford joined the New Zealand Military Forces and was posted to serve with the 3rd Division in the Pacific Ocean Areas. He was an intelligence officer, working in the headquarters of the divisional commander, Major General Harold Barrowclough, from 1942 to 1943. At the end of his military service, he was posted to the reserve and resumed his academic career.

== Later life ==
Health problems affected his later years and he died suddenly from pneumonia on 11 April 1963. He was survived by his wife Rose née Mann, a former school teacher who he had married in 1932 at Southampton, and the couple's four children. His papers were acquired from his widow by the University of Auckland.
