= Alex (film) =

- Directed by: Megan Simpson
- Written by: Ken Catran
- Based on: the novel by Tessa Duder
- Produced by: Tom Parkinson; Phil Gerlach
- Starring: Lauren Jackson; Chris Haywood; Josh Picker
- Cinematography: Donald Duncan
- Edited by: Tony Kavanagh
- Music by: Todd Hunter
- Production companies: Isambard Productions; Total Film and Television; New Zealand Film Commission; Australian Film Finance Corporation
- Release date: 1992
- Running time: 105 mins
- Countries: New Zealand; Australia
- Language: English

Alex is a 1993 Australian-New Zealand drama film directed by Megan Simpson and starring Lauren Jackson, Chris Haywood, and Josh Picker. It is based on a popular young adult novel by Tessa Duder. The film was never released theatrically in Australia, but shown in some foreign territories and went straight to video.

== Premise ==
A young headstrong New Zealand woman's (Lauren Jackson) quest against the setbacks, intense rivalry and personal tragedy to win selection for the 1960 Rome Olympic Games in the women's 100m freestyle.

== Cast ==
- Lauren A. Jackson as Alex Archer
- Chris Haywood as Mr Jack
- Josh Picker as Andy
- Cathy Godbold as Maggie Benton
- Elizabeth Hawthorne as Mrs Benton
- Bruce Phillips as Mr Archer
- May Lloyd as Mrs Archer
- Patrick Smith as Mr Benton
- Rima Te Wiata as Female Commentator
- Mark Wright as Male Commentator
- Grant Tilly as Mr Upjohn
- Greg Johnson as Male Journo
- Alison Bruce as Female Journo
