= Golan Maaka =

New Zealand doctor (1904–1978)

Golan Haberfield Maaka (4 April 1904 – 17 May 1978) was a New Zealand medical doctor and one of the country's first full-time Māori general practitioners. He identified with the Ngāti Kahungunu and Ngāi Tahu iwi.

Maaka was born in Takapau, Hawke's Bay Region, New Zealand on 4 April 1904. A bright child he was educated at Heretaunga School in Hastings, Te Aute College and Dannevirke High School. He received a scholarship to study medicine at the University of Otago commencing his studies in 1924. As a fifth year student he wrote a dissertation on the public health conditions at Rātana Pā. He graduated MB, ChB in 1937 becoming a house surgeon at Napier Hospital where he had been working as a medical officer since the early 1930s. In 1938 he joined the Far East Relief Fund, run by the Order of St John and the Red Cross, to work in China. He worked at a Presbyterian Mission Hospital at Yichang which came under Japanese attack. Because of the fighting he had to leave China by an overland route arriving back in New Zealand in 1939.

Although he wanted to serve in WWII he was instead deployed by the Department of Health to Tāneatua to address the high incidence of syphilis amongst Māori. He worked on the same in Northland as well as TB. In 1944 he took up general practice in Whakatāne where he worked for 35 years. Although trained in western medicine he also used Māori traditional healing methods (rongoā). He researched the blood groups of Māori with haematologist John Staveley collecting samples from Ngāi Tūhoe.

Maaka died in Whakatāne on 17 May 1978.

A biography Dr. Golan Maaka: Maori doctor by his grandson Bradford Haami was published in 1995.

== Publications ==
- Maaka, G (March 1960). "Health trends in the Maori today". Te Ao Hou.
