= New Zealand Blood Service =

New Zealand government agency

- Te Ratonga Toto O Aotearoa (Māori)
- Logo of the New Zealand Blood Service

Agency overview
- Formed: July 1, 1998; 28 years ago
- Jurisdiction: Government of New Zealand
- Headquarters: 71 Great South Road, Epsom Auckland
- Employees: 711
- Annual budget: $178 million NZD (2022)
- Minister responsible: Hon. Simeon Brown, Minister of Health
- Agency executive: Ms Sam Cliffe, CEO
- Website: www.nzblood.co.nz

The New Zealand Blood Service (in te reo Māori: Te Ratonga Toto O Aotearoa) is the provider of blood services for New Zealand. The service is a Crown entity responsible to New Zealand's Parliament and is governed by a Board appointed by the Minister of Health.

== History ==
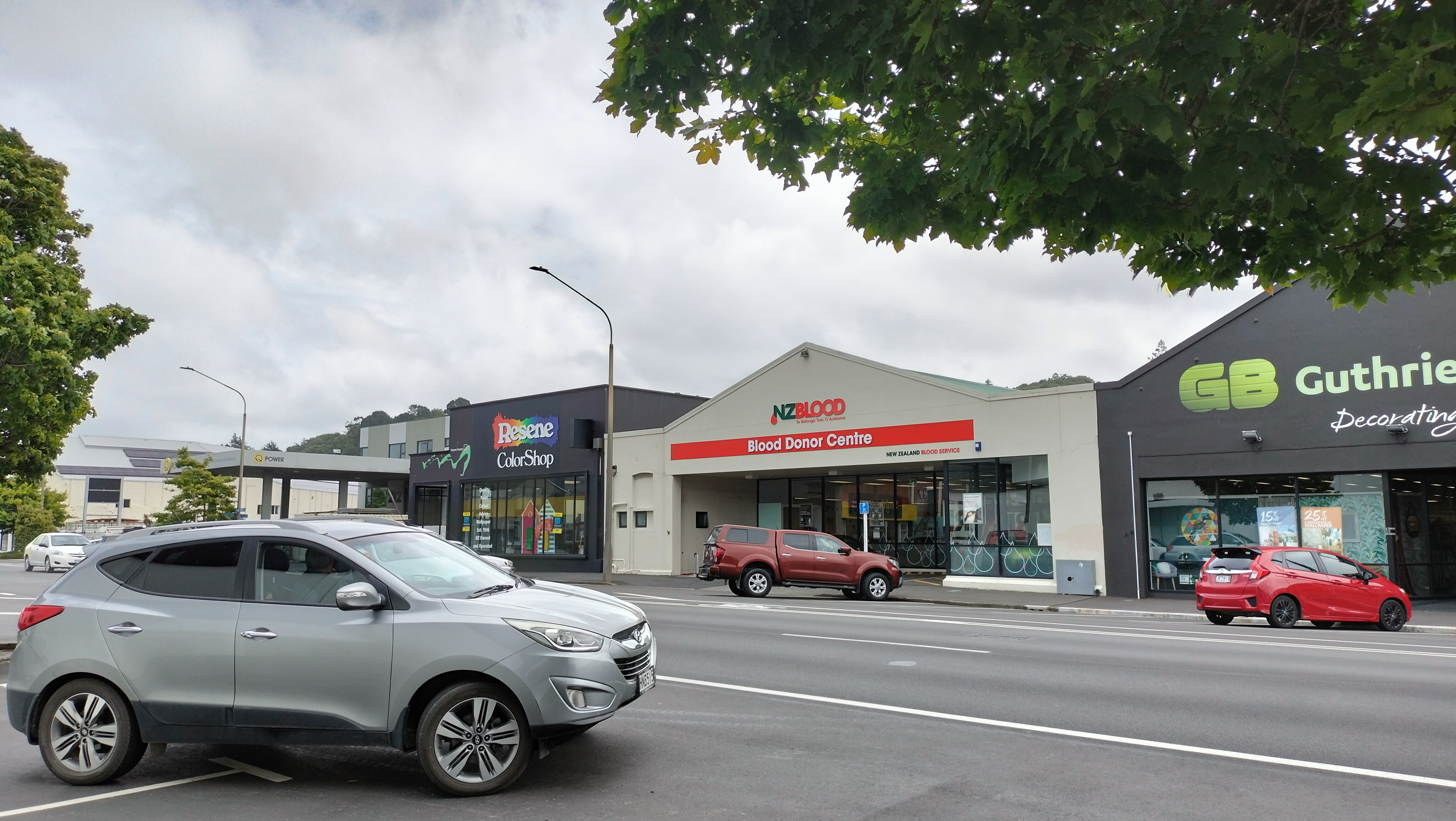
The Dunedin Blood Donor Centre on Crawford Street

The New Zealand Blood Service (NZBS) was formed on 1 July 1998, when the Health Amendment Act 1998 was passed by Parliament. NZBS was created to provide the people of New Zealand with safe, appropriate and timely access to blood and tissue products and related services to meet their health needs. NZBS is responsible for the development of an integrated national blood transfusion process from the collection of blood from volunteer donors to the transfusion of blood products within the hospital environment – a 'vein to vein' transfusion service.

Approximately 29,000 New Zealanders need blood or blood products every year and less than 4% of New Zealanders donate.

In November 2020, Organ Donation New Zealand became part of the NZBS.

On 14 December 2020, the NZBS amended its donation policies to reduce the blood deferral period for gay and bisexual men as well as male sex workers from 12 to 3 months.

On 4 October 2021, the New Zealand Heart Valve Bank became part of NZBS.

In mid February 2024, the NZBS confirmed that it would lift the mad cow disease blood donation restriction from 29 February. This restriction had been in place since 2000 and had excluded people who had lived in the United Kingdom, France and Ireland between 1980 and 1996 for at least six months from donating blood and plasma in New Zealand.

In October 2025, the NZ Blood Service established a new blood and plasma donor centre in Porirua to meet growing demand for plasma nationwide.

== Duties ==
New Zealand Blood Service has three groups of key responsibilities and activities:

- Donor Services: blood collection, based on voluntary, unpaid donations;
- Technical Services
  - Processing of blood donations, by separating blood donations into blood components;
  - Accreditation testing of blood donations, to minimise risk to the recipients of blood and blood products;
  - Blood banking at hospital-based laboratories and the Red Cell Reference Laboratory, where blood products are tested pre-transfusion and matched to each individual patient.
  - Tissue banking of bone, skin and heart valves
  - Tissue typing and the New Zealand Transplant and Immunogenetics Laboratory
- Clinical Services
  - 24/7 medical support
  - nursing education and clinical support
  - oversight of all blood banks in the country
  - provision of therapeutic services such as stem cell collection, plasma exchanges and therapeutic venesection

=== Blood collection ===
New Zealand Blood Service plans and forecasts demand from hospitals and uses this to calculate the number of appointments and donations required for the week, based on blood type. Blood type is key, as donations are matched to the blood types of the patients being treated in hospitals.

Each year NZBS collects approximately 106,000 whole blood donations, 110,000 plasma donations and 18,000 units of platelets.

NZBS has nine Donor Centres around New Zealand and runs over 300 mobile blood drives each year. The Donor Centres are in Auckland (Epsom, Manukau and North Shore), Hamilton, Tauranga, Palmerston North, Wellington, Christchurch and Dunedin. Mobile blood drives take place in community halls, education centres and workplaces. Whole blood donors can donate at a mobile blood drive or any of the nine Donor Centres. Plasma and platelet donations require an apheresis machine and so can only be made at nine Donor Centres with these facilities.

In order to minimise risk for recipients of blood and blood products, NZBS has detailed eligibility criteria in place for potential donors. These include a donor's age, weight, health and travel history.

=== Processing of blood donations ===
Blood donations are processed at sites: Auckland, Wellington and Christchurch. These sites collectively process around 106,000 donations each year.

Processing involves the separation of blood donations into blood components: red cells, platelets and plasma. Other types of donations such as stem cells and tissues are also processed and stored at these sites.

=== Accreditation testing of blood donations ===
Accreditation testing is centralised in Auckland and Christchurch. Accreditation testing of all blood donations involves two distinct processes: blood grouping and screening for infectious markers.

=== Blood banks ===
Blood banks are the pre-transfusion testing laboratories where blood products are matched to suit each individual patient. This includes determining the patient's blood type and matching this with appropriate products.

Blood banks are always located at hospitals and are often staffed after hours to meet any urgent need for blood. NZBS operates six blood banks within hospitals across New Zealand. Within the 20 District Health Board (DHB) Blood Bank laboratories also perform pre-transfusion testing in line with defined quality standards.
