= Te Aute College =

Location
- 100 State Highway 2 Pukehou; Central Hawke's Bay 4142; New Zealand; 39.8273°S 176.6345°E

Information
- Type: State Integrated, Boys, Secondary
- Motto: Whakatangata Kia Kaha; Quit ye like men – be strong
- Established: 1854
- Ministry of Education Institution no.: 232
- Principal: Rachel Kingi (acting)
- Enrolment: 77 (July 2026)
- Socio-economic decile: 3G
- Website: www.teaute.maori.nz

Te Aute College (Māori: Te Kura o Te Aute) is a school in the Hawke's Bay region of New Zealand. It opened in 1854 with twelve pupils under Samuel Williams, an Anglican missionary, and nephew and son-in-law of Bishop William Williams. It has a strong Māori character.

Sir George Grey, on behalf of the Government of New Zealand, and Bishop Selwyn discussed with the Māori chiefs establishing a school. The initial endowment of 3,397 acres of land was provided by Ngāti Te Whatuiāpiti, a hapū of the Ngāti Kahungunu iwi. In 1857, a Deed of Gift transferred the land from Te Whatuiāpiti to the Crown, with a request that it be granted to the Bishop of New Zealand and his successors. Sir George Grey, on behalf of the Government of New Zealand, provided an endowment of 4,000 acres. Te Aute Trust was established to manage the endowment of land and to build the school.

== History ==
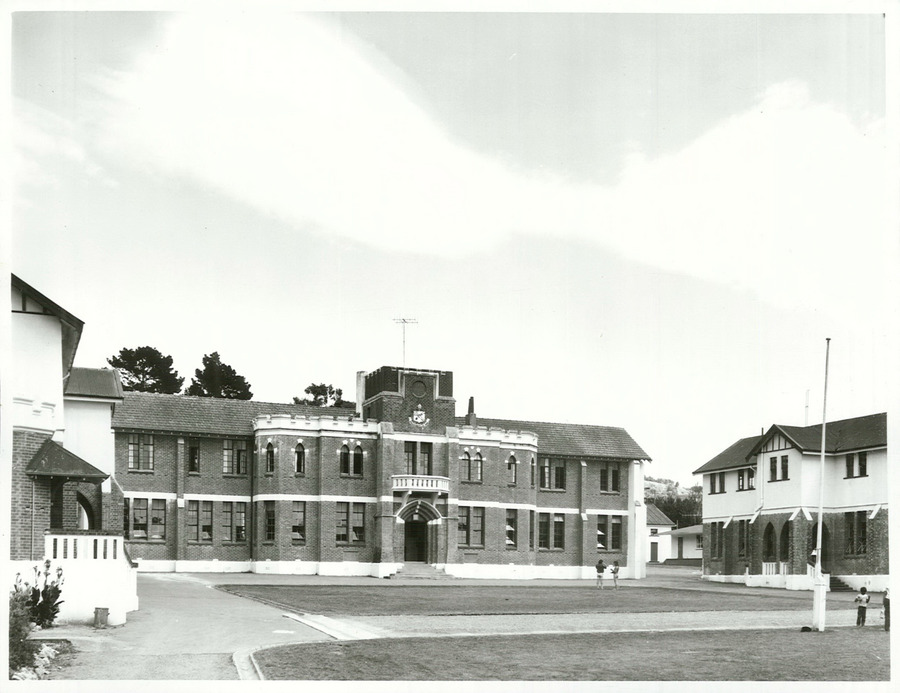
Te Aute College in 1975

=== Establishment ===
Te Aute is situated within a valley of significant strategic importance to local hapū. The nearby Roto-a-Tara pā had been the key stronghold for Te Whatuiāpiti during the Musket Wars, and was still a key settlement during the 1850s. From as early as 1840 the Anglican Bishop William Williams had established a mission station at Gisborne and was proselytizing actively among the East Coast tribes, and William Colenso had established a mission in Napier. Plans to establish a school for the local hapū were in motion from as early as 1851, when large blocks of Māori land in the region were acquired by the Crown. Then, when Colenso was dismissed from his mission in 1851, Williams' nephew Samuel Williams took up residence in the region, and began advancing the plan to establish a school. He met with Te Whatuiāpiti representatives at Roto-a-Tara pā on 17 April 1853, accompanied by the Governor Sir George Grey, who provided the Crown's backing for the plan. An agreement was made at that meeting for a school to be established at Te Aute, with the crown supplying 4000 acres of land and Te Whatuiāpiti hapū gifting an additional 3397 acres. In recent decades, the original acquisition of the Crown's portion of land gifted for the school has been the subject of a Waitangi Tribunal claim, which is presently in the settlement process.

=== Early history ===
Samuel Williams worked to develop the land by clearing fern and scrub to run sheep on the land. By 1856 there were 15 students enrolled, although the role fell to 4 by 1859. After only five years in operation, a fire destroyed much of the college and forced its closure in 1859. In 1869 a Royal Commission examined the operations of the Trust. The government offered £500 to construct the buildings, on the condition that the school would be under government control rather than that of the Anglican Church.

Samuel Williams began fundraising for the reconstruction of the college, accumulating £700 by 1870 – in part thanks to financial assistance from an aunt, Catherine Heathcote. Rebuilding began in 1871 and was completed in 1872. The college was reopened in 1872 under John Reynolds as headmaster. It began to grow steadily, with 24 Māori and 3 English boarders in attendance by 1874, and some day pupils.

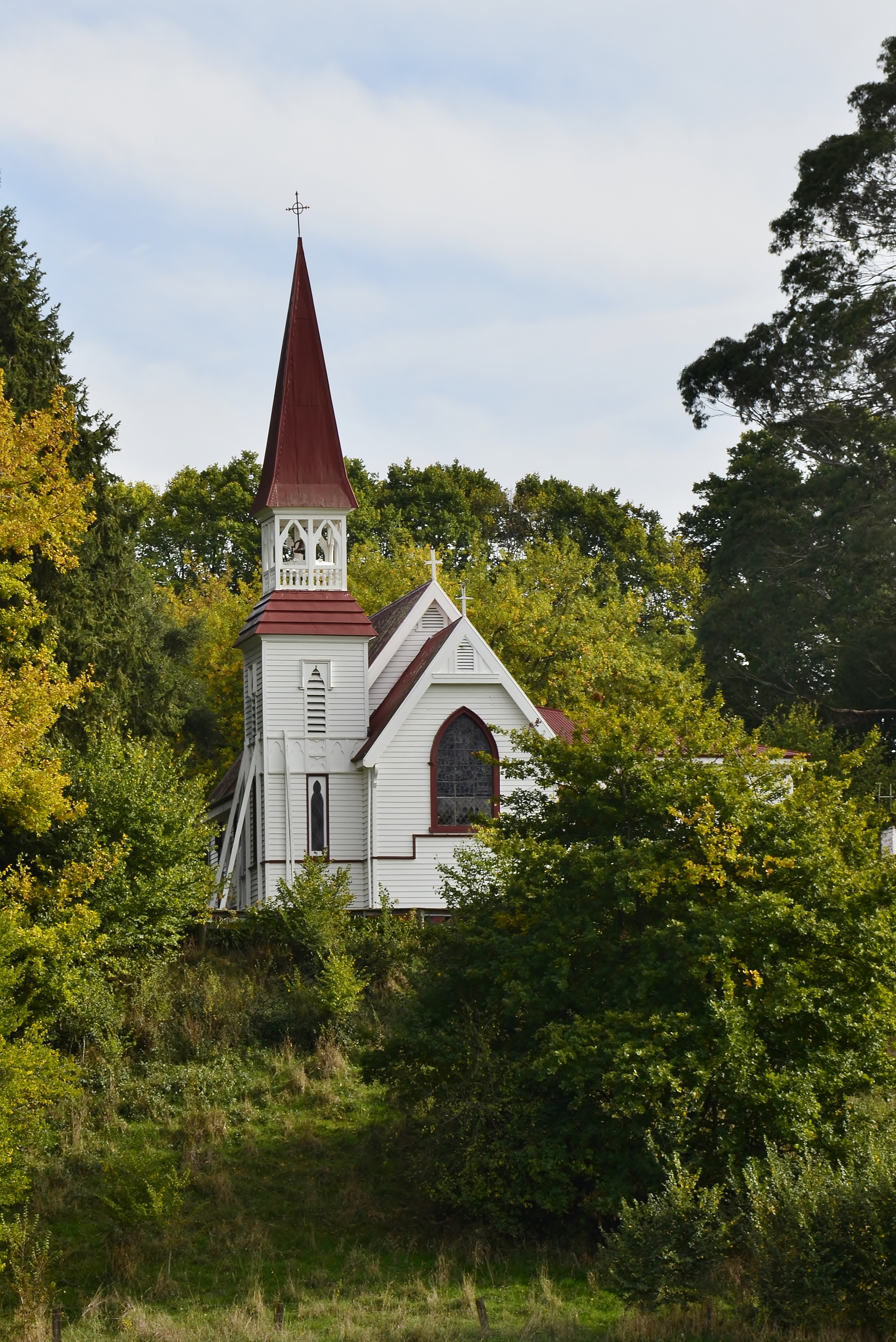
Te Aute College Chapel, designed by Charles Natusch

The college chapel was constructed in 1900, in a design by architect Charles Natusch.

Between 1878 and 1912 Te Aute was led by headmaster John Thornton, who implemented a curriculum developed along the lines of an English grammar school. In 1883 the college was visited by James Pope, the government-appointed inspector of native schools, and received praise for Thornton's curriculum. Pope described the standards reached at Te Aute in mathematics and science as 'equal to those of any secondary school in the country.'

I tried from the very first to raise the standard of the school, and … conceived the idea of preparing Maori boys for the matriculation examination of the New Zealand University ... I saw that the time would come when the Maoris would wish to have their own doctors, their own lawyers, and their own clergymen, and I felt it was only just to the race to provide facilities for their doing so.

— John Thornton, Headmaster (1878–1912)

By 1900 Te Aute was renowned for high academic standards and had become pre-eminent among Māori boarding colleges, as it was sending several boys onto university each year.

=== 20th century ===
In 1906 a Royal Commission of Inquiry was established to investigate the effectiveness of teaching at Te Aute and other Māori boarding colleges. George Hogben, the newly appointed inspector of native schools, recommended that the college discontinue instruction in Latin, euclidean geometry, and algebra, and increase agricultural and manual instruction. His view was that the most academically able students could be sent to ordinary secondary schools, and he predicted that eventually Te Aute would have no role to play in preparing boys for university. Thornton defended the existing academic curriculum, arguing that Māori opinion favoured academic instruction and that Māori parents relied on Te Aute for academic rather than vocational education. Ultimately the commission recommended that greater emphasis be placed on manual and technical instruction in agriculture, and the college's trustees complied under pressure from the Department of Education. In the following years the college's attempted pivot toward vocational instruction began alienating academically gifted students, notably Golan Maaka. In 1922, Maaka became disillusioned with the heavy focus on agricultural instruction and the lack of Māori cultural studies at the college. He left Te Aute as a result and completed his schooling in Dannevirke instead.

In 1918 the college was damaged significantly by fire again. This coincided with the impact of the 1918 influenza epidemic, ultimately forcing the college to close temporarily. Reconstruction planning began immediately, with college trustees opting for more modern brick buildings. While construction planning continued, the college reopened in 1919 under a new headmaster E. G. Loten. Loten was a proponent of agricultural education, and satisfied the Department of Education's wish for an agriculturally intensive curriculum. On 9 September 1922 the foundation stone of the first new brick facility was laid by Churchill Julius, the Archbishop of New Zealand. It was named The Julius Wing and was opened in April 1923. Later that year, the foundation stone of the second brick facility was laid by the Governor General, The Viscount Jellicoe, and the building was named The Jellicoe Wing. The third and final brick facility was the largest – it contained the college library, its assembly hall and its administration offices – and was named after Governor General Sir Charles Fergusson, who laid its foundation stone in 1926 and officially opened it in 1927.

On 3 February 1931, the college was severely damaged by the Hawke's Bay earthquake. There were no deaths, but the top storey of the Jellicoe and Julius wings were levelled, and the tower atop the Fergusson block collapsed. The buildings were repaired and reinforced, but the cost of £7,769 placed an enormous financial burden on the college.

On 27 November 1986, the house of Allen Williams was recognised as a Category I heritage building by the New Zealand Historic Places Trust. Williams was a nephew of Samuel Williams, and the house – known as The Cottage – is the last remaining residential building from the time of the college's foundation.

In 1992 Hukarere Girls' College was temporarily closed, and many of its students were permitted to board at Te Aute instead. As a result, the college became co-educational, but later reverted to a boys' school in 2005.

== Young Māori Party ==
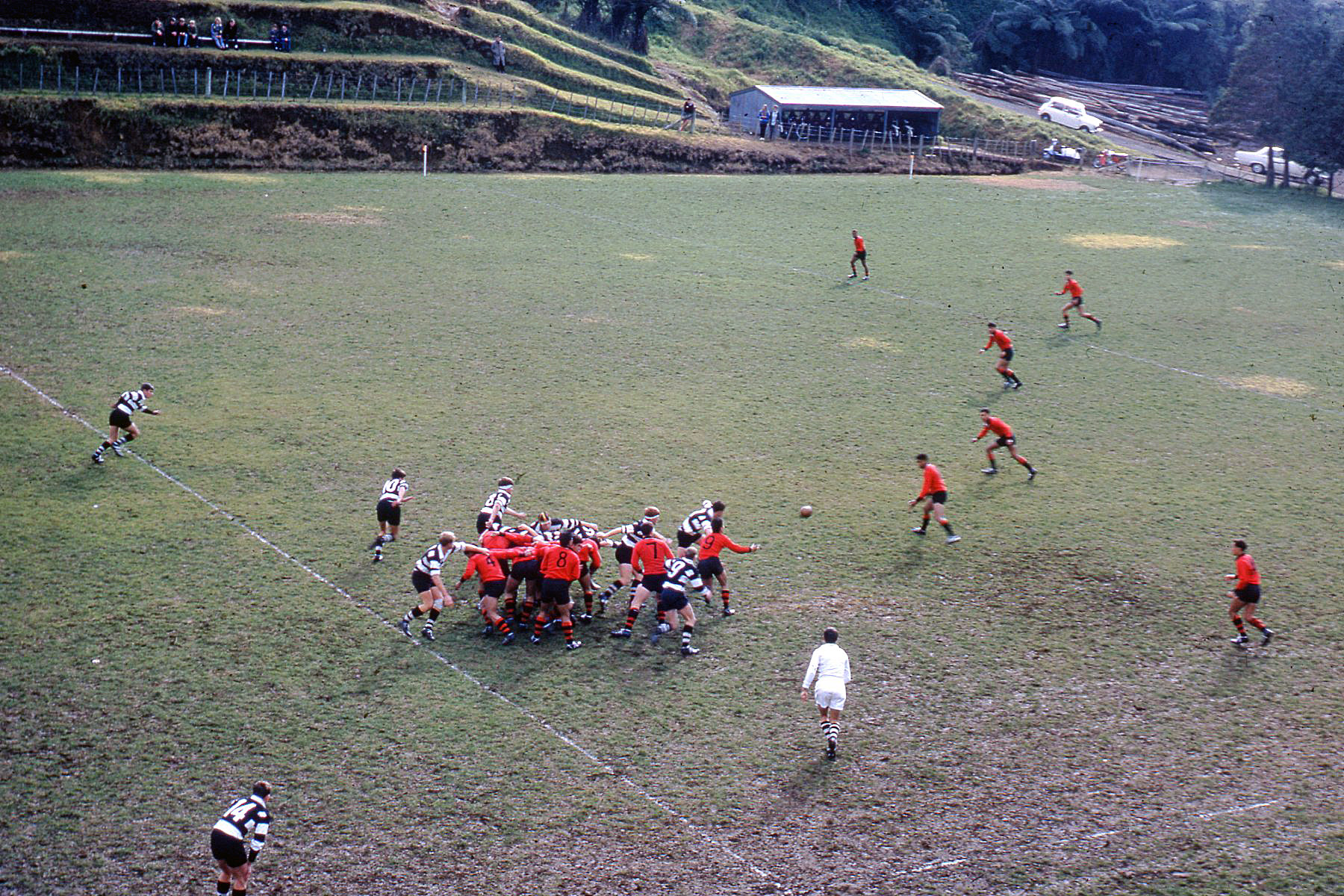
Te Aute College playing school rugby in New Plymouth against New Plymouth Boys' High School in 1968

The Young Māori Party established in 1902, which was dedicated to improving the position of Māori, grew out of the Te Aute Students Association, started by former students of the college in 1897. Old boys of Te Aute who were associated with the Young Māori Party include Rēweti Kōhere, Āpirana Ngata, Te Rangi Hīroa, Paraire Tomoana and Māui Pōmare.

== Governance ==
=== Headmasters ===
- The Reverend Samuel Williams (1854–1859)
- John Reynolds (1872–1878)
- John Thornton (1878–1912)
- The Reverend J. A. McNickle (1912–1919)
- E. G. Loten (1919–1950)
- Richard Webb (1951–1966)
- Noel Vickridge (1966–1973)
- The Reverend Phillip Cherrington (1974–1976)
- Awi Riddell (1977–1989)
- Ngāhiwi Tangaere (1989–1994)
- Brian Morris (1995)
- Darrell Waiti (1996–2001)
- Lennie Johns (2002–2003)
- Wikitoria Osborne (acting) (2003–2004)
- Tom Ratima (2004)
- Tauira Takurua (2005–2008)
- Darrell Waiti (2008)
- Pripi McRoberts Blake (2009–2013)
- Shane Hiha (2013–2021)
- Richard Schumacher (acting) (February to August 2022)
- Rachel Kingi (acting) (August 2022 – present)

== Funding ==
The funding of the Trust through the granting of leases of the lands that was not used for school operations was the subject of debate in the early part of the 20th century. After the 1906 Royal Commission into the operations of the Trust the endowed lands was placed under lease in perpetuity, which restricted the ability of subsequent managers of the Trust to generate income from the lands. In 1963 an attempt was made to improve the finances of the Trust. In the 1970s, the college was again hit by financial difficulties. In 1976 Te Aute become a State Integrated School under the 1975 Integration Act.

== Scholarships ==
Several scholarship funds have been set up since the college's establishment. In October 1877, Sir Douglas Maclean set up the Te Makarini Trust with an initial endowment of £3,000, which still provides annual scholarships to gifted students. The fund was established in memory of Sir Donald McLean, an influential figure in Māori-settler relations in the mid-1800s and a prominent Hawke's Bay magistrate. In 1908, a legacy of £1,000 from the late Sir Walter Buller was gifted to the Te Aute Trustees for investment, the proceeds of which provided for a scholarship for many of the college's students over the following decades.

== Notable alumni ==
- Sandy Adsett, visual artist and educator who is acknowledged for championing the art of kōwhaiwhai painting.
- Manu Bennett – Film and television actor, appeared in the Starz series Spartacus, Peter Jackson's adaptations of The Hobbit, and The CW series Arrow.
- Jamie Dixon – head coach of the University of Pittsburgh men's basketball team (2003–2016), began his professional coaching career while teaching at Te Aute in 1989.
- Sir Edward Durie served on the High Court of New Zealand between 1998 and 2004.
- Sir Mason Durie was a professor of Māori Studies and research academic at Massey University. He is known for his contributions to Māori health.
- Ned Ellison – doctor, medical administrator and rugby player.
- Thomas Rangiwahia Ellison – rugby union player, including All Black (1893), also played in the New Zealand Native team (1888–1889). One of the first Māori admitted to the bar, practising as a solicitor and barrister.
- Riki Flutey – rugby union player, including NZ Under 19s (1999), England (2008), British and Irish Lions (2009).
- Rowley Habib, poet, playwright, and writer of short stories and television scripts.
- Kane Hames – rugby union player, including All Blacks.
- Pakaariki Harrison – Nationally acclaimed master carver.
- Norm Hewitt – rugby union player, including All Blacks (1993–1998).
- Te Rangi Hīroa (Sir Peter Buck) – anthropologist and historian, medical doctor, and Member of Parliament for the Northern Māori electorate (1909–1914).
- Taituha Peina Kingi – rugby union player, including All Blacks. (early 1920s)
- Golan Maaka – among the first Māori general practitioners of medicine, pioneer in Māori health.
- Apirana Mahuika, teacher, and chair of Rūnanga o Ngāti Porou from its establishment in 1987 until his death.
- Sir Howard Morrison – singer and entertainer who gained fame as part of the Howard Morrison Quartet.
- Sir Sidney Moko Mead – Internationally renowned anthropologist, established the department of Māori studies at Victoria University of Wellington.
- Hirini Melbourne, composer, singer, university lecturer, poet and author.
- Moana-Nui-a-Kiwa Ngarimu – Soldier of the Māori Battalion posthumously awarded the Victoria Cross in 1943.
- Sir Āpirana Ngata – Member of Parliament for the Eastern Maori electorate (1905–1943), Minister of Maori Affairs (1928–1934).
- Sir Māui Pōmare – Pioneer in Māori health, Member of Parliament for the Western Maori electorate (1911–1930), Minister of Health (1923–1926).
- Joe Royal – rugby union player, including Māori All Blacks (2013).
- Piri Sciascia, university administrator.
- Sir Pita Sharples – Member of Parliament for Tāmaki Makaurau (2005–2014), Minister of Māori Affairs (2008–2014), co-leader of the Māori Party (2004–2013).
- George Skudder – rugby union player, including All Blacks (1969–1973).
- Ngataiharuru Taepa – artist.
- Karl Te Nana – rugby union player, including Gold medalist in rugby sevens at the 2002 Commonwealth Games.
- Paraire Tomoana – journalist, historian, and lyricist known for his composition of Pōkarekare Ana.
- William Brown Turei – Archbishop and Primate of the Anglican Church in Aotearoa, New Zealand and Polynesia.
- Dudley Tuti – an Anglican bishop in the Solomon Islands.
- Piri Weepu – rugby union player, including All Blacks (2004–2013) and 2011 Rugby World Cup final winner.
