= Taratahi Agricultural Training Centre =

Taratahi Institute of Agriculture
- Other name: Taratahi Agricultural Training Centre (2017)
- Established: 1919
- Administrative staff: 58 (2010)
- Location: Masterton, New Zealand
- Website: agtaster.kiwi

Taratahi Agricultural Training Centre (in receivership) is a tertiary provider offering full and part-time agriculture training courses. Established in 1919 as a training farm in central Wairarapa for men returning from World War I, it was known as the Wairarapa Cadet Training Farm. Today the centre operates under an Act of Parliament (the Taratahi Agricultural Training Centre (Wairarapa) Act 1969), and consists of a full-time residential campus near Masterton and six non-residential campuses in Northland, Auckland, Taranaki, Waikato, Hawke's Bay, and Southland. Taratahi has also acquired a campus in Telford, situated in Balclutha in the South Island. The Telford location is also a full-time residential campus.

Taratahi Agricultural Training Centre offers a number of full-time and part-time courses in agriculture, from Level 1, which is delivered through the national schools programme, right through to Level 5 diplomas in agriculture.

In December 2018, Taratahi was placed into receivership by the High Court of New Zealand over its failure to fully repay fees it had been ordered to refund in 2014.

In July 2020 the Centre was reopened to host fully-funded Ag Contracting and Primary Industry Training courses. The programmes are delivered in partnership with the Ministry for Primary Industries, Eastern Institute of Technology (EIT) and Universal College of Learning (UCOL). The courses began in July 2020 and run until December 2020, information, applications and enrolments are via the agtaster.kiwi website.

== History ==
Taratahi Agricultural Training Centre was established in 1919 in central Wairarapa as a training farm for men returning from the First World War. The original costs were funded by gifts and public donations with a further Government contribution. The original centre commenced operation with 60 men receiving practical farm training. Later the farm was used for various purposes related to training in agricultural skills.

After the Second World War, Taratahi was again made available to returned servicemen. From 1944 to 1950, 80 men passed through the farm under the Rehabilitation Department's Scheme, prior to settling onto their own farms. In 1951, the Trustees decided to carry out extensive improvements and enlarged the activities of the farm to provide training for young people between the ages of 16 – 20 years.

For a long time Taratahi was known as the Wairarapa Cadet Training Farm. It changed its name in the early 1980s to Taratahi Agricultural Training Centre. Taratahi is governed under the terms of the Taratahi Agricultural Training Centre (Wairarapa) Act 1969.

The main Taratahi campus is situated 11 km south of Masterton, the Wairarapa’s largest town. Taratahi are within 1½ hours of both Palmerston North and Wellington. The campus is situated in the heart of the dairy operation. The classrooms and workshops are all on campus as well. There are a number of other properties within the Wairarapa that are owned, leased, and managed by Taratahi.

In 2014, Taratahi was ordered to repay $8.6 million for courses it had failed to deliver. In 2018, about half had been paid back, and the High Court of New Zealand ordered that it be placed in receivership and its assets liquidated.

== Facilities ==
The Wairarapa campus has:

- a gymnasium
- common room with pool table
- swimming pool
- dining hall

Each room contains a bed, desk, wardrobe and heater. There are eight accommodation ‘pods’ which include eight student rooms plus a kitchenette, sitting room, and ablution facilities.
