= Ben Atiga =

NZ international rugby union player

- Full name: Benjamin Alo Charles Atiga
- Born: 5 May 1983 (age 43) Auckland, New Zealand
- Height: 175 cm (5 ft 9 in)
- Weight: 99 kg (218 lb; 15 st 8 lb)
- School: Auckland Grammar School
- Notable relative: George Skudder (uncle)

Rugby union career
- Position(s): Centre, Fullback
Senior career
Years	Team	Apps	(Points)
2002–2010	Auckland	84	(190)
2004–2008	Blues	45	(75)
2011	Highlanders	1	(0)
2011	Otago	10	(5)
2012–2014	Edinburgh	30	(5)
- Correct as of 08 December 2024
International career
Years	Team	Apps	(Points)
2002–2004	New Zealand U21	15	(83)
2005–2006	Junior All Blacks	4	(5)
2003	New Zealand	1	(0)
- Correct as of 08 December 2024
National sevens team
Years	Team		Comps
2007	New Zealand		1
- Correct as of 08 December 2024

Benjamin Alo Charles Atiga (born 5 May 1983 in Auckland) is a former rugby union player and current wellbeing coach. He played centre and fullback, and his coaching focuses on player welfare.

== Early life and education ==
Atiga's Samoan grandfather played in the first Samoan international team and others in his family also played international rugby for Tonga and New Zealand.

He was educated at Auckland Grammar School and became the 50th All Black that the school has produced.

Atiga won world titles for New Zealand at Under-19 (2001 and 2002) and Under-21 level in 2003 and as captain in 2004, during his junior career. He was also part of the Under-21 team in 2002 where they placed 3rd in the tournament.

== Playing career ==
Atiga played one test for the New Zealand national rugby union team, against Tonga in the 2003 Rugby World Cup after being called into the squad as an injury replacement for Ben Blair. He played for the Junior All Blacks in 2005 against Australia 'A' and in 2006 in the inaugural Pacific Nations Cup. Atiga played for Auckland in the NPC, winning three national titles and one title in the 2007 Air New Zealand Cup, where Auckland went through an undefeated season, claiming the Ranfurly Shield in the same year. Atiga played for the Blues in Super Rugby, and in 2007 he joined the All Blacks Sevens team at the end of the Blues' season. After captaining Auckland in the 2008 ITM Cup season, Atiga made the decision to take a break from professional rugby.

After his break from rugby, in April 2010 it was announced that he would rejoin the Auckland Rugby Union and the Auckland Blues. After a season in Auckland, Atiga was signed by the Highlanders for the 2011 season, following numerous injuries in the squad. He started from the bench against the Hurricanes in his return to top tier rugby. He subsequently played the 2011 ITM Cup with Otago.

In April 2012, he signed with Edinburgh Rugby for two seasons. At the beginning of the season, Atiga was diagnosed with degenerative arthritis in his hip. He played both seasons with Edinburgh and retired from professional rugby at the end of the 2013–2014 season due to the joint disease.

== Player wellbeing ==
Atiga has been open about his struggles with wellbeing whilst playing. As of 2019, he works with Scotland Rugby in the area of player wellbeing.

Awards
Preceded by (South Africa) Pat Barnard	IRB International U21 Player of the Year; 2003	Succeeded by (New Zealand) Jerome Kaino
