= Tommy Chase =

New Zealand rugby union and rugby league player

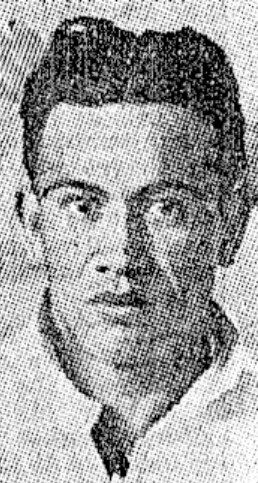

Personal information
- Full name: Tame Henare Teehi Chase
- Born: 1912 Moawhango, Whanganui, New Zealand
- Died: 4 May 1956 (aged 44) New Zealand

Playing information
- Height: 172.5 cm (5 ft 7.9 in)
- Weight: 75 kg (11 st 11 lb)

Rugby union
- Position: Fullback, Wing, Centre, Second five, First five
Club
Years	Team	Pld	T	G	FG	P
1929	Huia	1	0	1	0	2
1930	Old Boys	4	2	0	0	6
1931–34	Huia	45	13	5	3	63
1935	Ratana	13	4	20	1	62
1936–37	Huia	9	2	7	0	23
	Total	72	21	33	4	156
Representative
Years	Team	Pld	T	G	FG	P
1931–36	Whanganui Māori	5	0	1	0	2
1931–37	Taihape	15	9	4	0	39
1933–37	Whanganui	12	5	11	1	43
1933	Tūwharetoa	1	0	0	1	4
1934	Taihau-auru	1	0	0	1	4
1934–35	New Zealand Māori	10	3	0	1	13
1935	Whanganui Metropolitan	2	1	0	0	3
1935	NZ Māori Trial (North)	2	0	0	1	4

Rugby league
- Position: Fullback, Wing, Centre, Stand-off, Halfback
Club
Years	Team	Pld	T	G	FG	P
1937–45	Manukau	126	32	168	1	434
Representative
Years	Team	Pld	T	G	FG	P
1937–39	New Zealand Trial	4	2	6	0	24
1937	New Zealand Māori	2	0	1	0	2
1937–42	Auckland Māori (Tāmaki)	12	2	10	0	26
1938–42	Auckland	3	1	10	0	23
1939	New Zealand	1	0	0	0	0
1942	Māori XIII	1	0	0	0	0
- Relatives: Rangi Chase (brother)

Tommy Chase (Tame Henare Teehi Chase) (1912- 4 May 1956) was a rugby league player. He represented the New Zealand rugby league team in one match on the 1939 aborted tour of England. In the process he became the 271st player to represent New Zealand. He also represented New Zealand Māori rugby league team, Auckland, and Auckland Māori on several occasions. He had joined the Manukau club in Auckland in 1937 following several years playing rugby union. He originally played for the Huia club in the Moawhango area in Whanganui and also spent time at the Old Boys and Ratana clubs. Chase also represented Taihape, Whanganui, Whanganui Māori, the Māori All Blacks, and several other representative sides. He became famous for his versatility where he played in almost every backline position on both rugby union and rugby league. Though it was generally stated that his ideal position on attack was the left wing due to a lightning fast left foot side step and swerve.

== Early life ==
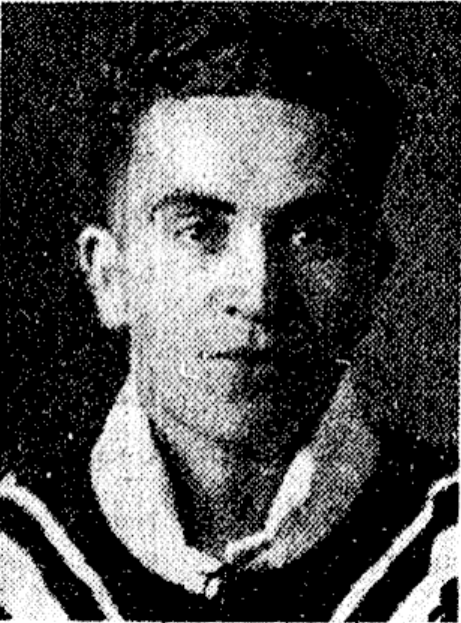
Tommy's younger brother Rangi Chase, Kiwi #248

Tommy Chase was born in 1912 to Wire Hiraka Te Rakeipohe Pine and Paekiri Pine in Moawhango, in rural Whanganui. One of his younger half brothers was Rangi Chase who he would move to Auckland with in 1937 where they played together for the Manukau rugby league club. Rangi also represented New Zealand at rugby league.

== Playing career ==
=== Rugby union ===
==== Huia club (1928-29) ====
Like many members of his family, Chase played a lot of sport in the local Moawhango area near Taihape. He played rugby for the (Moawhango) Huia rugby club which is now the Taihape Rugby Club following a merger in 1999 with Taihape Pirates. In 1928 he was playing with Huia Juniors. He was listed in many of their published team lists but the games received very little coverage so it is unknown how he performed. In 1929 he made one appearance for the Huia senior side early in the season with six juniors playing in their match with Hautapu. Huia lost 17-8 with Chase kicking a conversion near the end of the game.

==== Old Boys (Taihape) 1930 ====
The 1930 season saw Chase move to the Old Boys club in Taihape. Aged 18 he played regularly for the senior side though with relatively little coverage in the newspapers he is only confirmed to have played in 4 games. He made his debut for them on May 17 against Hautapu in the fullback position. At one point he dropped a kick allowing a try to Haupatu. The following week against Huia he scored two tries in their 25-19 win at the Oval Domain. He next played in a 21-11 loss to Pirates but was mentioned for returning play to halfway with an excellent kick.

Midweek he was reclassified from senior to junior by the Whanganui Union. The following day he played for the Taihape Māori team against Ruapehu District Māori at the Oval Domain for the Mako Cup. The match was drawn 3-3 with Chase playing on the wing. Early in the match he missed a penalty and soon after a conversion of their only try. Near halftime he stopped Wilson, the opposing winger when Ruapehu threatened with the ball.

Two weeks later he was selected for the Taihape Junior side to play Whanganui Metropolitan Juniors on July 5 at the Taihape recreation ground. He was chosen to play at centre. His side won 8-5 and he featured prominently in a passing movement leading to Meihana's try. Chase missed the conversion and later was caught in possession and nearly conceded a try.

On July 26 Chase played again for Taihape Māori in a game against Wainui-a-rua for the Whenuaroa Shield. He kicked a penalty in the first half and in the second half he crossed for a try but the Taihape side was defeated 21-14.

On August 2 Chase again turned out for the Old Boys senior side in a match against Pirates. He was involved in several attacking movements though Old Boys lost 12-8. Two weeks later he played for Taihape Juniors in a match with Rangitikei Juniors with Taihape winning 22-16. Chase was involved in their second try to E Brogden after fielding a kick. His final game of the season was for Taihape Country against Taihape Town on August 23. The Town side won 33-23 on the Oval Domain with Chase at halfback. Former All Black, Moke Belliss was playing in the Town side.

==== Huia (1931-34) ====
The 1931 season saw Chase return to his Huia club and he was to play there for the next four seasons. However at the start of the year he attended the Old Boy Football Club's annual meeting to receive a medal donated by E. McDonnell for the most improved junior player last year. On April 18 he played in Huia's practice match against Hautapu and scored a try in a 16-16 draw. On June 6 they beat Old Boys 11-5 with Chase gaining possession and passing to Kingi who scored which gave them a 9-5 lead. Chase's next game was on June 6 in a 9-3 loss to Hautapu. In their 10-0 win against Pirates on July 4 he was involved in several attacking movements. He had been playing second five eighth but on July 18 when they played Hautapu he moved to fullback. Huia won 11-3 with Chase doing “all that was expected of him as full-back”.

Chase was named at centre in a Whanganui Māori trial game to be played at Spriggens Park in August. He was then selected for Whanganui Māori to play Hawke's Bay Māori on August 12. The Hawke’s Bay Māori side won 9-5. Returning to his Huia club side he played at fullback in their 11-0 win over Pirates. Huia then won the championship after beating Old Boys 17-6 with Chase at fullback once more. Huia then played for the Presidents Rose Bowl, played between the winners of the Taihape competition and the winners of the Rangitikei competition which was the Rata club. Chase didn't play in the game and instead was replaced by his brother Ted.

The season started for Huia on April 30 with them losing to Hautapu 20-17. Chase was responsible for "some excellent defensive play at one stage" along with Charlie Bennett for Huia. Against Old Boys in a 9-8 win he played fullback and was only mentioned as missing an easy kick. A week later on May 21 Huia lost 11-0 to Pirates but the Whanganui Chronicle wrote “had it not been for the wonderful display of the Huia custodian, Tommy Chase, who saved his side on numerous occasions, Pirates would have piled up a large number of points. After the game he was nominated by the Taihape subunion for the Māori trial match. The following weekend Chase played for the Country side against Town at the Whanganui Oval Domain. The match was to raise money for the Injured Players Fund. He started at fullback but moved to first five for the second half with Town winning 11-8. Huia had a default win over Mangaweka before a 21-3 loss to Hautapu on June11 with Chase effecting a good save after a group of three Hautapu players broke away with the ball at their feet. On Thursday, June 16 Huia played Hukaroa for the Mako Cup. Hukaroa was a small settlement south of Raetihi who played out of Ohakune. Huia were defending the cup in Taihape and won 8-6. Chase played at fullback and was involved in the play many times though mostly on defense.

Chase was then selected at fullback in the Taihape Māori side to play Rangitikei Māori on June 23. They were competing for the Māori shield. Taihape Māori lost 13 to 9 in a sodden ground after heavy rain. Early in the game Chase missed a conversion to a try and then fumbled the ball which allowed J Taiuru to score. In the second half he kicked over the Rangitikei Māori line but their opponents forced and then later Chase was beaten by the bounce of the ball and R. Potaka nearly scored. Chase then played for Huia in an 11-0 win over Old Boys and was named on the wing to play in the Taihape representative side to play Ruapehu. The two sides were sub-union representative teams playing for the Main Trunk Brewery Cup on July 2. He had a spectacular game with Taihape winning 33-13, scoring two tries, kicking two conversions, and two penalties. The Whanganui Chronicle wrote that Chase was “outstanding” and “proved himself to be a dashing winger”. During the first half he “caused a thrill by making a spectacular dash down the side-line” but his team mate (Mana) failed to gain possession. Soon after Brogden broke away and passed “to Chase who got over with two Ruapehu players hanging on to him”, then he was involved in a passing movement for Joblin’s try. He then kicked a penalty, missed a penalty, and kicked a conversion on halftime. His second try came soon after the break, in the corner untouched. Chase kicked another penalty and then was forced from the field with an injured hand. In a 7-6 loss to Pirates it was said that Chase did not play up to the form of the representative game but made a good defensive tackle on Biel when Pirates threatened.

On Wednesday July 13 Chase played for Huia for the Mako Cup at the Taihape Recreation Ground. Their opponents were Punahau (Levin Māori) and the visiting side won 8-3 to claim the trophy Huia had defended weeks earlier. Chase started on the wing but moved to fullback after halftime and was mentioned a handful of times in the match report but didn't do anything spectacular. Ten days later he was selected on the wing for Taihape for their game against the Whanganui Metropolitan team. The Metropolitan side won 13-5 with the Whanganui Chronicle writing that Taihape’s inside backs played poorly and “in consequence, the ability of T. Chase and Hall, on the wings, could not be assessed. Chase in particular, looked a likely type of attacking winger, but he rarely saw the ball except when in a defending position”. With the scores 0-0 Chase took a penalty kick and the ball hit the crossbar but bounced out. He did get a chance later on when Taihape spread the ball from a scrum win but he knocked on in front of the goal line. The Chronicle said later that Chase was probably the best winger but was not the equal of [George] Bullock-Douglas or of Brisco in the Metropolitan side. Bullock Douglas was the 21 year old Whanganui winger and was selected for the All Blacks during this 1932 season. Chase then returned to his Huia club side in a 28-5 loss to Pirates where they only had 14 players which was reduced to 13 during the first half through injury to Whai Pine. Chase scored all their points from fullback with a try which he converted. Early on he showed “a rare turn of speed”, and “swerved past three opponents but was grassed by Kilkolly”. His try came after a passing movement where he “raced over and touched down”.

His form saw him selected at fullback for Whanganui Māori for their August 13 match with Taranaki Māori at Pukekura Park in New Plymouth. Whanganui Māori won 21 to 12. Chase line kicked very well, and then later in the first half “upended” Broughton. He then followed a kick fast and “smothered” his opposite, Jack McLeod. Chase then collared Broughton after he had streaked through from the opposite wing. McLeod would later convert to rugby league and play for New Zealand. The Taranaki Daily News in their match report mentioned him several times and wrote that he played “an able game at full-back”.

Chase returned to Taihape where he played for the Taihape side in a game against Rangitikei on August 17. He scored two tries on the wing on a heavy ground in a 41-19 loss which saw Rangitikei take the Pownall Trophy. Chase was “the best of the Taihape backs, displaying marked ability on attack and defence. His second try was a particularly fine effort and left the opposition standing”. His first came after a passing movement where he crossed, then his second was described; “Chase led the opposition to believe that he was going to pass to Pika... and then changed direction rapidly to score by the posts, after completely bamboozling the opposition”. After the match he was selected to play for the same side in the Main Trunk Cup match against Taumarunui on August 20. Taihape lost 19 to 6 to lose the trophy to their opponents. Chase started on the wing but was moved to second five eighth. He had a busy game and was mentioned several times in the newspaper description of the match both in attack and defence.

In early March, 1933 Chase performed at an open air concert in Taihape as part of the “Māori troupe from Moawhango (in full native costume)”. Later in the same year he was to make his debut for the Whanganui representative side. His first game of the season was on April 29 for Huia against Hautapu with Huia winning 6-3. Chase was said to be “in great form” and scored a try after chasing a kick where he beat two defenders in the sprint for it, “it was a great solo effort… and met with well-merited applause”.

Chase then scored two tries in a 23-15 win over Old Boys on May 13. He was said to have “played an outstanding game”. He was then selected in a Taihape trial match for the Probables team during the week. Their opponents were Utiku and the Taihape Probables won 5-0 with Chase scoring a try which he converted. Following the game he was selected in the Taihape side to play Whanganui Metropolitan. The Whanganui Chronicle wrote that “Chase is regarded as the best three-quarter in the district, and if he maintains his present form, Taihape should have no cause for complaint”. Inside Chase at centre was McKay who played for New Zealand Māori in 1930 and 1931. The match was played at Spriggens Park on May 20 and was for the Pownall Trophy. The only mention of Chase in the match report was when he missed a penalty late in the first half with the city side leading 4-0. They went on to win 12-11.

He returned to his Huia side in a 3-3 draw with Pirates on May 27. He was involved in a lot of attacking players and made good runs beating a lot of defenders. It was said that he made the most of his opportunities and was undoubtedly the best winger in Taihape.

Chase was selected in the reserves for Whanganui for their match against Taranaki and trained with the team at Spriggens Park. He went back to his Huia side and was prominent defensively and had a busy game in a 6-3 win over Hautapu. He was “the star performer in the Huia rearguard, being resourceful on attack and brilliant on defence. He saved his side time and time again”.

His next match was for Taihape Māori against Rangitikei Māori for the Whenuaroa Shield on June 21. Chase was named on the wing. Rangitikei Māori won 20-17 at their Marton ground. Chase was described as a “burly winger” and he nearly scored early in the match. Then he “brought the crowd to their feet with a dazzling run to the green line where he handed on to Abbott who went over for an easy try”. In the second half he “smothered Gatty and enabled Bennett” to score. Near full-time he crossed in the corner for what would have been the equalising try but was called back for stepping into touch. He was said to have been their best back along with Kingi and scored after kicking through and beating the Rangitikei Māori fullback, Terry, to the ball. The Whanganui Chronicle wrote that Chase, “the left winger also played good football, scoring a good try, and his clean picking up while travelling at top speed was a pleasing feature of his play”. While the Manawatu Times said he “was the outstanding back on the ground”. Chase then played for Taihape against Taumarunui on July 1 at the Taumarunui Domain. Taihape won the Main Trunk Brewery Cup with a 19-6 win, with Chase said to have played brilliantly on the wing. He scored a try early in the match and was mentioned several times in the match report on both attack and defence.

Returning to his Huia side he played centre in a 6-3 win over Pirates on July 8, though he did not get many chances. Chase then scored a spectacular try in a 17-9 defeat of Uitiku. It was described in the newspapers: “Tommy Chase, who was playing centre-three quarter for Huia cut right through the Utiku defence to score one of the best tries ever registered on the Taihape Recreation ground. It was a try that would have reflected credit on any All Black, and stamps Chase as a really great play”. It was said he “left the opposition standing. The way he suddenly changed direction and swerved past several Utiku players to score behind the posts was a treat to watch”. For Huia against Hautapu on July 22, Chase scored two tries and was highly involved in the match. He was said to be the best back on the ground and was subsequently selected in the Taihape side to play Rangitikei later in the week. Taihape won the game 31-6 at Taihape with Chase scoring two tries once again. The Whanganui Chronicle wrote “Chase played a great game on the wing for Taihape and was the best back on the ground”. He was “sound on defence and brilliant on attack and is rapidly developing into a first rate winger. The way he side-stepped McPhee, and then drew Simons, the opposing wing three-quarter, to send Hansen over unopposed, was a treat to watch”.

For Huia against Pirates in a 14-6 loss on August 5, Chase had another busy game. Chase was selected for Taihape to play against Whanganui Metropolitan on August 12 for the Pownall Trophy. Chase though initially decided that he would not play in the game and would instead play for Taihauauru against Tokerau in the Prince Of Wales Cup. It was mentioned in a piece on the matter that he weighed 11 stone. Chase changed his mind before the weekend though and played for Taihape after all. He was marking All Black winger, George Bullock-Douglas. Inside Bullock-Douglas was Māori All Black Pat Potaka who had also played for the All Blacks in 1923, while Chase's Taihape team was captained by Moke Bellis. Of Chase it was written that he “is a great player who will be watched with a great deal of interest… he has shown splendid form this season and if he is fed today will be a thorn to Whanganui”. The match was drawn 17-17 with most of the play on the opposite wing to Chase. When the ball did come to his wing he was usually on the defending side. The Whanganui Chronicle said that “Chase is the most promising winger seen in Taihape for many a long day. He possesses a rare turn of speed and can side step and swerve. He did not get many opportunities to display his ability last Saturday owing partly to the fact that Taihape seldom gained possession from the scrums…”. It was noted that by failing to play in the Māori trial match that he had “probably cost himself any chance of securing Māori All Black honours”.

==== Wanganui selection ====
On August 15 Chase was selected to play for Whanganui in their match with Hawke's Bay the following day. Whanganui won 21-17 in Whanganui. Hawke's Bay was the better team in the first half but in the second half the Whanganui forwards dominated and set their backs going and “from then on the game was a triumph for Jack Morgan, Brogden, Bullock-Douglas and Chase”. In comments on the players it was said “Chase gave the impression that he is the goods”. In the first half he caught Apsey in possession and got the ball, “going within an ace of scoring”. Later he “made a nice run and side-stepped three defenders” before passing infield to Lowe.

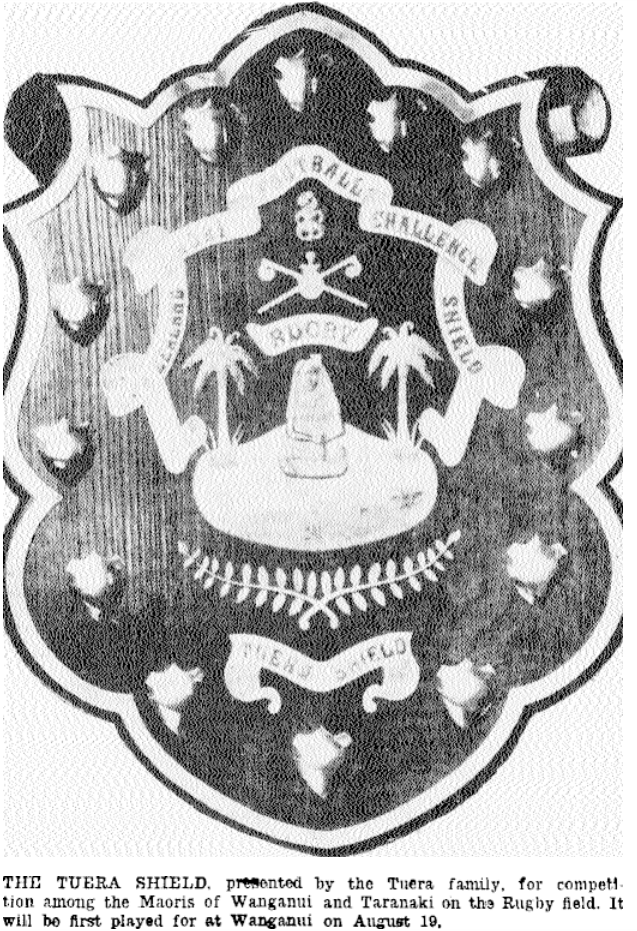
Tuera Shield

Three days later Chase played for Whanganui Māori against Taranaki Māori for the Tuera Shield. The Taranaki Māori side won 22 to 14. Chase had started on the wing but at halftime he moved into the centre position. Chase played in Whanganui’s next match midweek, on August 23 against Manawatu. Manawatu won 23 to 16 at Johnston Park. During the second half he “made a great run” but no try resulted. He was mentioned many times in the match report and he and Briscoe “were hard men to stop”. Chase then was not named in the Whanganui side to play King Country. Chase returned to his Huia side for their match with Hautapu on August 26. He was said not to have played very well at centre and missed some easy kicks. Chase then turned out for his seventh game in the month of August, for the Taihape team against Rangitikei. Taihape won 30-14 at Hunterville Domain. He made “a tricky run” that enabled Dean to score a try. He kicked two penalties for Huia on September 2 in a 12-8 win over Pirates which basically secured Huia the championship. He played at centre and did not get many opportunities.

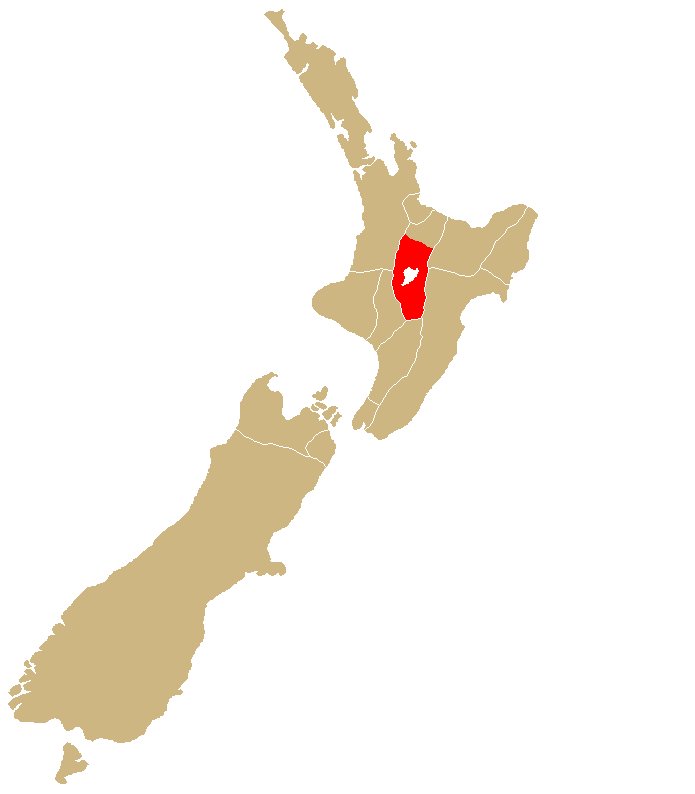
Ngāti Tūwharetoa tribal area which Chase was representing in a game against Arawa

Chase’s next game was a tribal match for Tūwharetoa against Arawa from the Rotorua area. The match was played at the later teams ground on September 9. He played well on the wing and was coming back into form in a 29-7 loss where he kicked a drop goal.

Chase was chosen in the 18 man Whanganui touring team for games at Waikato and Auckland. The Waikato game was won 34-19 by the local side. Chase played brilliantly, and early in the game he gathered “in a smart return to sail down for the corner to crash over for a good try”. His “spectacular dash” “raised the crowd to its toes”. He then “capped off a desultory back movement to run around for an easy try”. Then in the second half he “unwound a pretty movement, baffling four or five Waikato men before transferring to McPhee”. He was mentioned extensively in the match reports. Chase was said to be one of their two outstanding backs with the other being Rogers at fullback. “Chase was very elusive, but did not get too many chances. He always made a bold bid when in possession”.

The team then travelled to Auckland to play the Auckland side at Eden Park on September 23. He kicked a penalty and a conversion in their 21-19 loss. The Auckland Star wrote “a picturesque figure of the Whanganui side was Chase, a stocky, speedy Māori wing-threequarter. He gave a colourful exhibition, flashed in and out of the picture throughout the afternoon, and thrilled the crowd every time he obtained possession. He showed himself to be a winger of undoubted promise, with sure hands, a sound knowledge of positional play, and determination in running that won him much applause”. He was said to have come into his own in both games and justified his inclusion.

After returning home Chase played for Taihape against the Hawke's Bay colts on September 28 on the Oval Domain. They lost 10-6 with it said that Chase should have done the goal kicking. The writer said “if Chase is good enough to kick them at Auckland he is good enough to kick them at Taihape”. He “showed glimpses of his very best form and thrilled the spectators on more than one occasion. His side-stepping and swerving were a treat to watch”. Chase then played in the President’s Rose Bowl for Huia as the winners of the Taihape competition. Their opponents were Kaierau, winners of the Whanganui metropolitan competition on September 30. Chase played at centre and scored a try in their 13-7 win, though he had to leave the field with an injury near the end. He had recovered well enough to play the following weekend for Taihape against a visiting team from Wellington. Both teams were transported to the ground from the Gretna Hotel by a bullock wagon and dray drawn by ten bullocks. The game was played before “a record crowd” at the Taihape Recreation Ground. The Wellington team won 14-12. They included the likes of Cliff Porter the former All Black, and Frank Kilby, the current All Black captain, and Lance Johnson. Chase “played a great game at centre, and the way he drew the defence before sending Henery over for Taihape’s first try was a treat to watch. On another occasion Porter endeavoured to tackle him but he left the 1924 All Black captain standing”. Chase’s try gave Taihape the lead 12-11 after he swerved past Page to score. It was said that A. MacDonald, the Wellington centre was the best back on the field with Chase a close second. Chase was “easily the best back in Taihape and has played some great games in club and representative matches. Some of the best tries ever scored on the Taihape Domain have been registered by this promising player…”. The famous coach Billy Wallace, who played for the All Blacks from 1903 to 1908, visited Moawhango and coached Chase for about an hour while visiting with the Wellington side.

=== 1934 Huia and New Zealand Māori ===
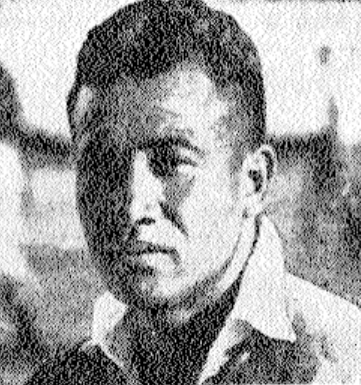
Portrait photograph of Chase from his Whanganui rugby playing days which was regularly used in newspapers.

The 1934 season saw Chase make the New Zealand Māori rugby side to tour Australia. He began the season having his feats of the previous season acknowledged by his Huia club at their annual general meeting, and he was also elected on to the management committee of the club. In Huia’s opening game, against Utiku on April 21, Chase kicked a “very neat” field goal in a 4-3 win. With drop goals at the time worth 4 points it essentially won them the game. He then scored a try in a 12-8 loss to Hautapu playing at centre. He scored another try on May 5 in an 8-5 win over Pirates.

Chase then became involved in the local United hockey side and played in the midweek competition played on Thursdays through May and into August. During this period he played in rugby games for Huia against Utiku and Hautapu before being selected in the Whanganui trial match to be played at Marton on May 22. The team he played for was named ‘North’, and also ‘Combined’ and was a combined Taihape-Rangitikei side against Whanganui Metropolitan which represented the Whanganui town. The combined side won 30-10 with Chase kicking two conversions on the wing before being subbed off at halftime. He was said to have been “always a dangerous man” and played better than his opposite, Downs, who was a Māori All Black. Chase kicked another field goal in a 9-6 win over Pirates on May 26. And then against Utiku the following weekend scored a try and kicked a conversion at centre in a 29-8 win. He was said to be “tricky as usual but gave some shocking passes”.

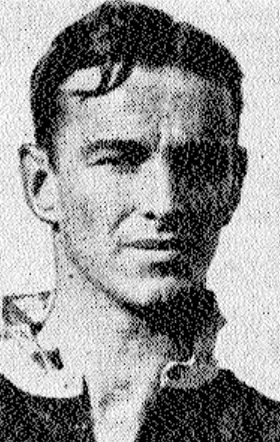
Winger, George Bullock-Douglas, the All Black from 1932-34 who Chase played against and with many times in the early 1930s.

The Whanganui Chronicle wrote that Chase and Bullock-Douglas warranted continuing with on the wings in the representative side after last years form. They also wrote a paragraph about him in portraits of the Wanganui players saying he had shown glimpses of the form which won him a representative place last year. Chase was unsurprisingly named on the wing in the Wanganui side to play Taranaki on June 4, Kings Birthday at Spriggens Park in Wanganui. Taranaki won 19-11 with Chase playing a poor game after moving to centre. He “missed his man [Edwards] on three occasions, and from two breaches of this type tries were scored”. Chase was better on attack where he was “tricky”, and it was suggested he stay on the wing and work on his tackling.

Chase returned to his Huia club side for three matches in June. Following the first against Hautapu he was nominated by the Whanganui Union for the North Island team to play the South Island. He kicked a penalty for Huia against Pirates on June 16 but missed a lot of shots at goal. Then after a game against Utiku on June 23 Chase was named in the Taihape side to play Rangitikei. It was written that “Chase’s play this season has not been exactly brilliant, although he is capable of brilliant play and it will be interesting to see how he fares on Saturday”. The match was drawn 8-8 in cold conditions with snow starting to fall near the end. Chase converted one of Taihape’s tries but on full time despite making a good effort he missed the game winning conversion of Wereta’s try in what was now described as “heavy” snow. He was involved in some good defensive work at centre but dropped a pass when a try seemed certain. Chase was named in a Country side to play Town in a Whanganui trial match for July 7. After the game he was requested to attend a Whanganui practice on the evening of July 10 before the side to play would be selected. On July 14 he played for Taihape against Whanganui Metropolitan for the Pownall Trophy with the town side winning 30-19. In the first half Chase got the ball and played it infield to the forwards with Moke Belliss scoring. Before halftime Chase was forced from the field with an injury. Chase’s injury was not serious as he was back playing for Huia on July 21 in an 8-0 win over Hautapu which won the championship for Huia.

==== Wanganui selection (1934) ====
Chase was selected in the Whanganui representative side to play Manawatu on July 28 on the left wing. Whanganui won 29-21 at Spriggens Park in Whanganui with Chase scoring a try and converting five tries with another penalty attempt hitting the crossbar and missing. His try came after Dickson made a good run and passed to Matthews “who flung a long pass out towards Chase, the ball having travelled right across the field. It bounced in front of the Taihape player and he scooped it up beautifully off the ground. In a twinkling he was over the line”. In comments on the game he was said to have been “sound on attack, but well below standard on defence. He also made up for lapses, however, by converting all five tries scored by Wanganui and scoring a try” albeit a dubious one with the ball appearing to fly out of his hands in a tackle before he grounded it. Chase was next named in the Taihape side to play Rangitikei on August 4 at the Hunterville Domain. Taihape won 16 to 9.

On August 11 Chase was picked for the Whanganui training squad and the same day he played for Whanganui Māori against Taranaki Māori in their annual match. Whanganui Māori won 14 to 8 with Chase kicking a conversion. He “showed cleverness and dash on the wing” along with Downs. They were “thrustful in attack. Chase displaying his side-stepping ability several times”. Though “both wings were weak on defence”.

Whanganui played Hawke’s Bay on August 16 for the Ranfurly Shield at McLean Park in Napier. Chase was on the left wing, outside Thakombau (a Fijian), at centre. Hawke's Bay won comfortably by 39 points to 16. Chase scored a try and two conversions, all in the second half. The Whanganui backs were poor on defence and “Chase and Downs never tackled anything”. His try came when Matthews put him away and he outpaced Smith and Vartan to score near the posts. Two days later on August 18 Chase played for Taihape against Taumarunui in a 27-14 win. He was involved in a lot of attacking play but missed several attempts at goal. On August 29 Chase turned out for his Huia side in the President's Rose Ball against Marton Old Boys. The Old Boys side won 15 to 13. Chase scored a try for Huia and kicked a field goal in the loss.

==== Māori All Blacks selection (1934) ====
Chase was selected in the Taihau-auru (West Coast) team to play Tairawhiti (East Coast) for the Prince Of Wales Cup at Rotorua on September 1. The Tairawhiti team won 16 to 10 with George Nēpia taking the field for the winners. In 1938 Nēpia and Chase became team mates at Manukau rugby league club in Auckland. Chase kicked a “nice drop-kick towards the close of the game”. Tragically his sides captain, Jack Ruru died as the result of injuries whilst playing. He had been concussed a couple of weeks earlier and was said to have been suffering still and he went down after attempting to stop a forward rush. He was taken to Rotorua Hospital and died of a brain hemorrhage. Following the match the Māori All Blacks side to go on a short tour of New Zealand was named with Chase missing out. However days later Nēpia, H. Harrison, and P. Himona gave notification that they would be unable to tour and Chase took Himona’s place in the squad on the wing. Ultimately Jack Hemi was called in to replace Nepia. Hemi would also join the Manukau rugby league side where the three would play. Himona became available to tour but it was decided to leave Chase in the squad and the forward from King Country, Len Kawe was called in to replace G. Ferris. Remarkably Kawe also switched to rugby league and joined Manukau playing for them in 1936 and 1937.

The first game was against South Canterbury at Fraser Park on September 12. Chase was named in the reserves but did not take the field. He was named in the five eighths in the next game against Otago at Carisbrook on September 15 with his weight listed at 11st 10. He was however not in the final match day 15 with P Kaua and H Mason in the five eighths positions.

Chase’s first game on the tour was against Southland at Rugby Park on September 19. Chase played at second five eighth and scored a try for the Māori All Blacks on debut in their 24-20 win. His try came early when they attacked with the ball going to Chase, “who cut through under the bar”.

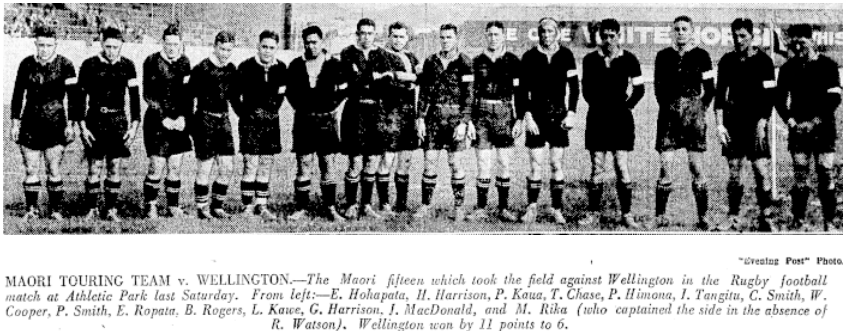
NZ Māori team to play Wellington at Athletic Park.

The Southland Times wrote “the stars, Hohapata, Chase, and H Harrison, coruscating in a brilliant blaze of dazzling evolutions and moves”. Chase was “ever ready to break through the middle backs and make play for C. Smith and the wings”, and “is an ideal five-eighth”. In the detailed description of the match Chase was mentioned continuously in attacking movements being involved in multiple tries and breaks. For the last game against Wellington on September 22, Chase was named as a reserve initially.

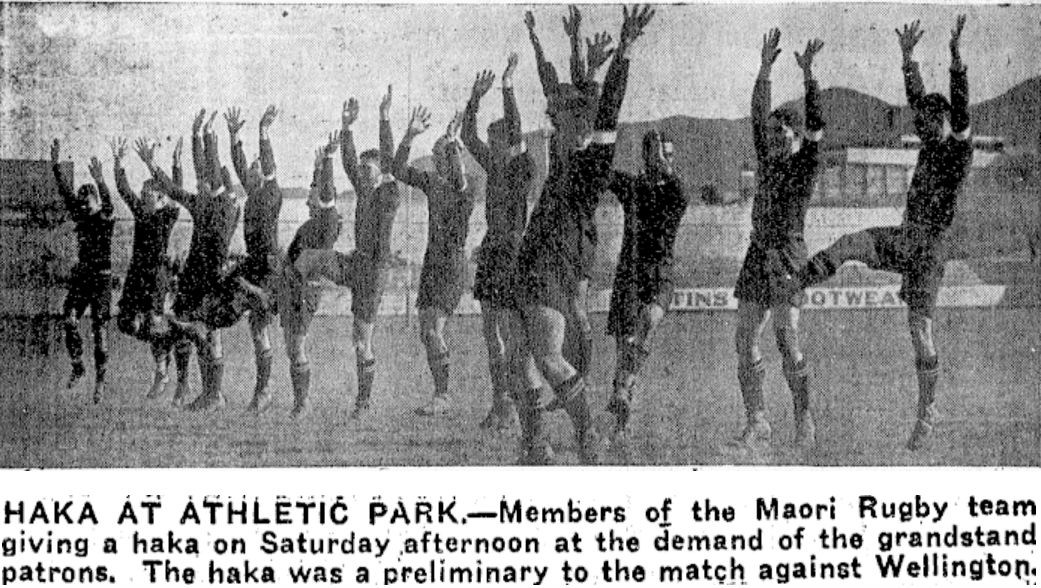

However he ended up playing at fullback in place of Jack Hemi who had received an injury to his leg against Southland. Wellington won the match 11-6. He was said to have “made a good substitute for Hemi at fullback”. He made a vain effort to stop A Wright from flying across in the corner for Wellington’s first try. He had to work hard with Hohapata and with good understanding to get the side out of trouble.

==== Ratana Club (1935) ====
In 1935 Chase moved to the reformed Ratana rugby club. They played in the Wanganui metropolitan competition based in the town of Wanganui. He debuted for them on April 13 in a practise game against Bulls. It was reported that “Chase, the crack ex-Taihape player, was a source of trouble to the Bulls backs, while his goal kicking was very fine indeed”. Ratana won 31-8 with Chase also scoring “tries” in addition to his goals. He then played in a competition game against the same opponent before a match against Waverley on April 27 where he kicked a penalty in a 6-3 loss. He “played gamely and effectively” doing a lot of good defensive work. He played at fullback and “his tackling was a revelation, his pace a big factor and his line kicking never at fault”. He kicked another penalty in a 14-6 loss to Technical Old Boys, a club he played a season with years earlier, in their next game, again playing at fullback. They played the same side the following Saturday and this time won 3-0. Chase “again played a sound game at full-back, extricating himself from many dangerous situations”.

Chase was selected on the wing in the Wanganui Metropolitan team to play against his old Taihape side. The game was played on May 18 at the Taihape Recreation Ground with the Wanganui town side winning 24-6. Early in the game their halfback, Jack Duncan, was injured so Jack Morgan the fullback moved to halfback and Chase was moved back to fullback. Chase showed “sureness and finesse” in the position and “gave an excellent display of how the fullback position should be filled”. He was “immeasurably superior to either Bradley or Johansen who played full back for Taihape”.

==== New Zealand Māori trial ====
In terms of his upcoming representative prospects the Wanganui Chronicle wrote “Chase has again proved himself a reliable custodian [fullback]. He has been brilliant in nearly all he has had to do and he has the Wanganui selector in a quandry” as to who to pick out of him and Jack Morgan. Further on they said “Tommy Chase (Ratana) and Murphy (Taihape) are both sure of participation in the Māori trial match at Hamilton and have excellent prospects of making the trip to Australia with the Māori team”.

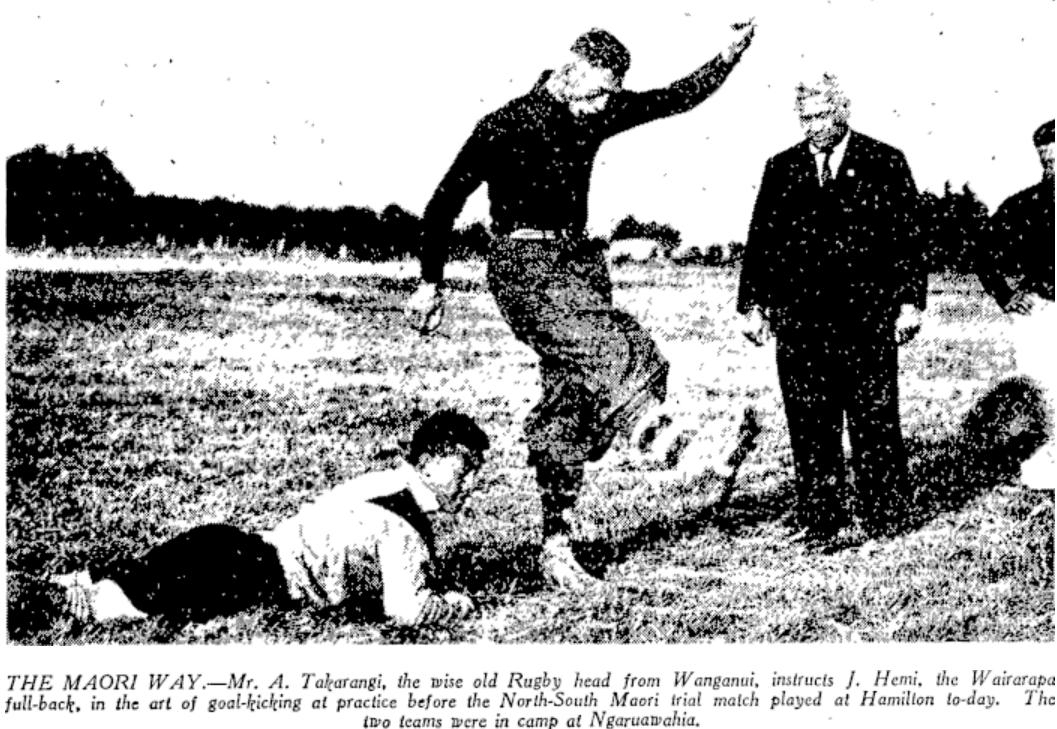
Jack Hemi practising his kicking under the coaching of Alec Takarangi, with Chase lying on the ground.

Chase was indeed selected for the trial to be played at Hamilton on May 22. He was named in the five eighths for the North Māori team. The Wanganui Chronicle writer named ‘crossbar’ speculated “how the Māori selectors came to select Tommy for a five eighth position beats the wind. But it may be one of those things which will come off and startle New Zealand. It would indeed be surprising if Chase developed into the type of inside back the Dominion is looking for. If he fails in that position it will be a pity, because on his showing in the three matches played in Wanganui this season he has distinct possibilities as a full back”. Although the trial was ostensibly to choose the Māori team to tour Australia the All Black selectors were still in attendance. It was said that Jack Hemi was the outstanding player on the field but also that “another player who impressed as having a chance to gain a trip home [referring to England, though it was hardly home for Chase and Hemi] was T. Chase, who at second five-eighths cut South’s defence to ribbons on several occasions”. In the first half he “drop kicked a smart goal” which made the score 11-9 to the South. In the second half Chase made “a brilliant cut through” which led to Phillips scoring. Then with the scores level at 14-14 “Chase cut through again, Harrison going over and Hemi converting”. The game ended up finishing 19-19 and was described as spectacular. It was said that Chase seemed certain of making the Māori side and he “played a sound defensive game, and on attack demonstrated a most valuable cut-in, which repeatedly gave him passage through the opposition”. He “straightened up movement after movement, cut in beautifully on more than one occasion, and he dropped a magnificent field goal”.

Chase returned to Wanganui and played for Ratana against Marist on May 25. He kicked three conversions and two penalties in a 21 to 9 win at the racecourse ground. Chase’s play was described as “excellent” at fullback. He was “the outstanding player on the field… and it was his line kicking that won the day”.

==== Wanganui selection ====
Chase was named in the Wanganui team to play Taranaki on June 3 in Wanganui. In descriptions of the selected players he was said to be “clever on his feet, fast off the mark and exceptionally deft and quick in handling the ball”. In regards to the Māori trial game he :gave one of the best exhibitions of five eighths play seen in big football for a season or two”.

In the match against Taranaki at Spriggens Park, Wanganui won 21-20. Chase played on the wing and was noted in contemporary reports for his line kicking, defensive clearances, ability to keep the ball in play, and a field goal scored while running at speed.

The Wanganui Rugby Union nominated Chase for the New Zealand side for either the British tour with the All Blacks or the New Zealand Māori tour of Australia. For the All Blacks they suggested five eighths, three-quarter, or fullback which was essentially six out of the seven back positions. He was said to have impressed Ted McKenzie and Vin Meredith greatly at the Hamilton trial. They were two of the four All Black selectors.

Chase played for Ratana on June 8 and kicked three conversions and was “outstanding”. In a short piece about him in the Wanganui Chronicle it said “Chase played a wonderful game for Ratana last Saturday. He kicked goals from patches of water. This lad, whose correct Maori name, by the way, is Tane Henare Teehi, has a rather solid scoring record for Wanganui Rugby. This season he has kicked 17 goals (conversions and penalties). In 1933 he scored 124 points and in 1934, 141 apart from tries and potted goals”. It would appear looking at the scoring breakdown of the games he played in those seasons that those numbers were greatly exaggerated and were closer to half of those figures. He had a busy game at centre in a 24-0 loss to Kaierau on June 15. He was then selected in the Wanganui Metropolitan side to play Rangitikei for the Pownall Trophy on June 22. He scored a second half try in their 16-8 win.

==== Māori All Blacks tour of Australia (1935) ====
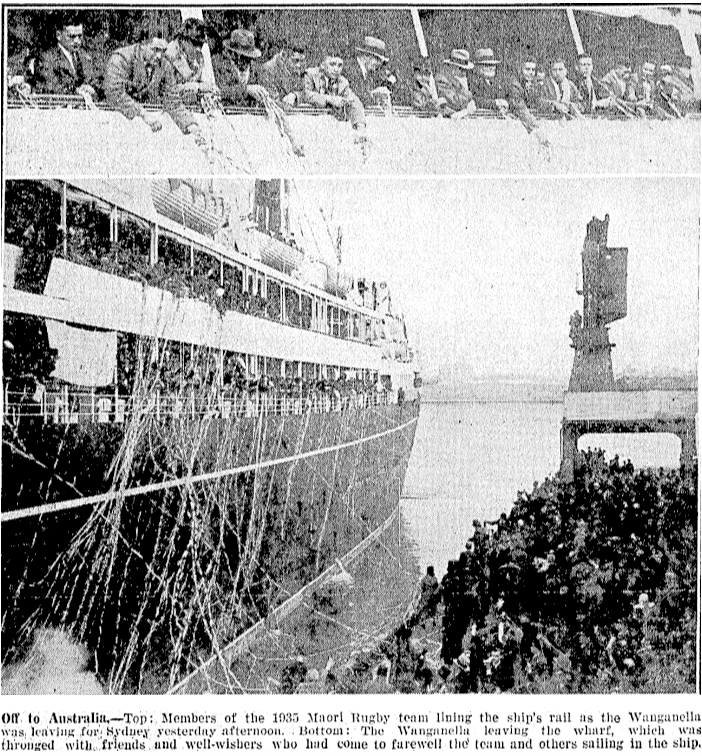
NZ Māori side departing for Australia.

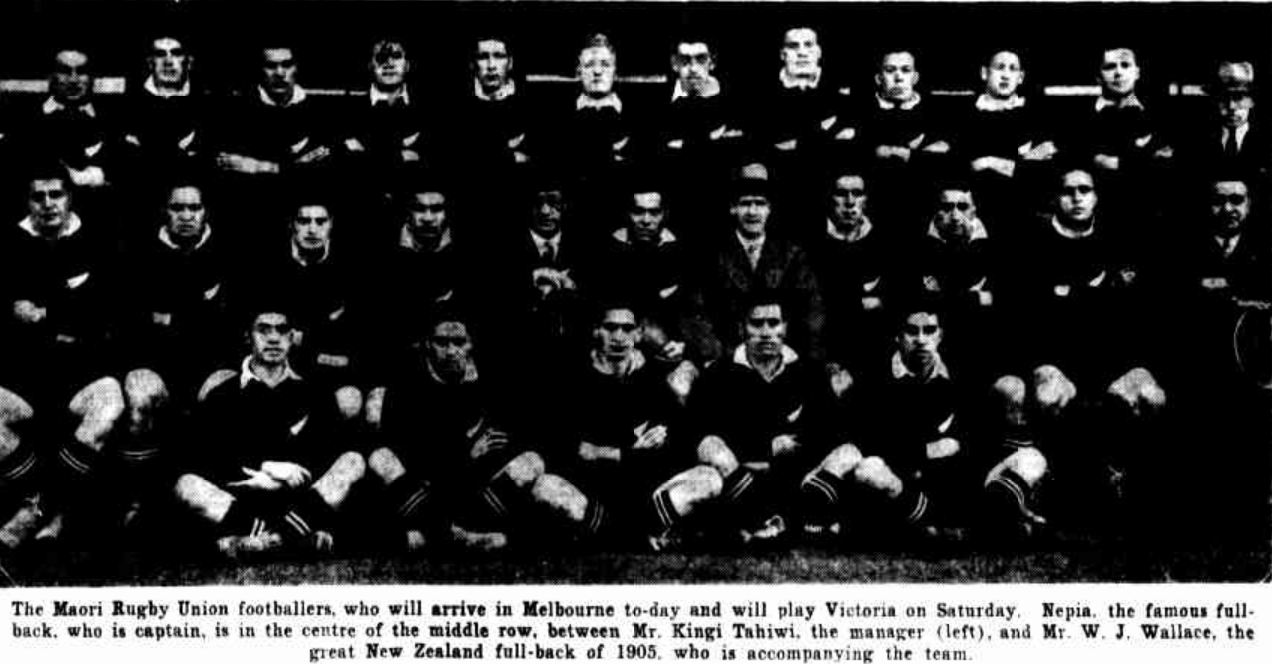
New Zealand Māori side.

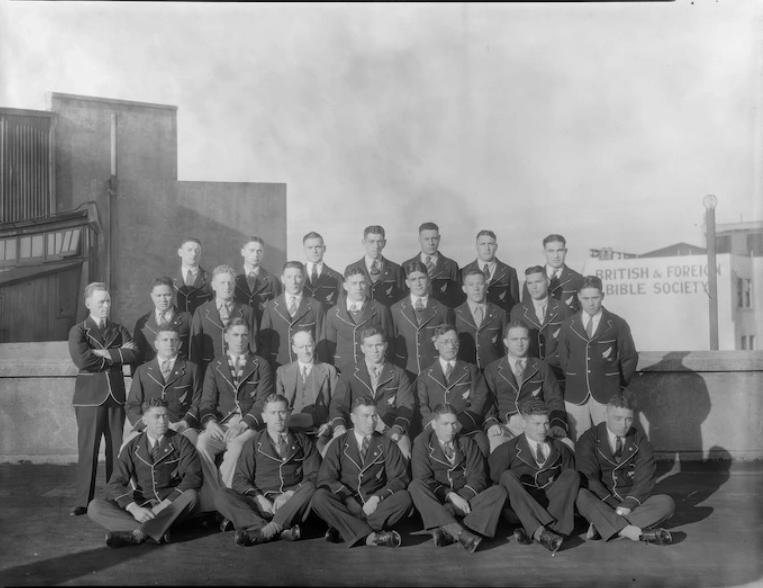
New Zealand Māori team before departing.

The New Zealand Māori team was to be named at Gisborne on June 22. Chase did not play in the Māori trial, Prince of Wales Cup match but was named in the Māori side to tour Australia. The Wanganui Chronicle had the named team and then a long piece on Chase’s selection and is form this year and in seasons past. The Wanganui Rugby Union congratulated Chase on his selection in their weekly meeting. He played one final game before departing for Australia for Ratana against Waverley. They lost 3-0 with Chase narrowly missing a drop goal which may have won them the game.

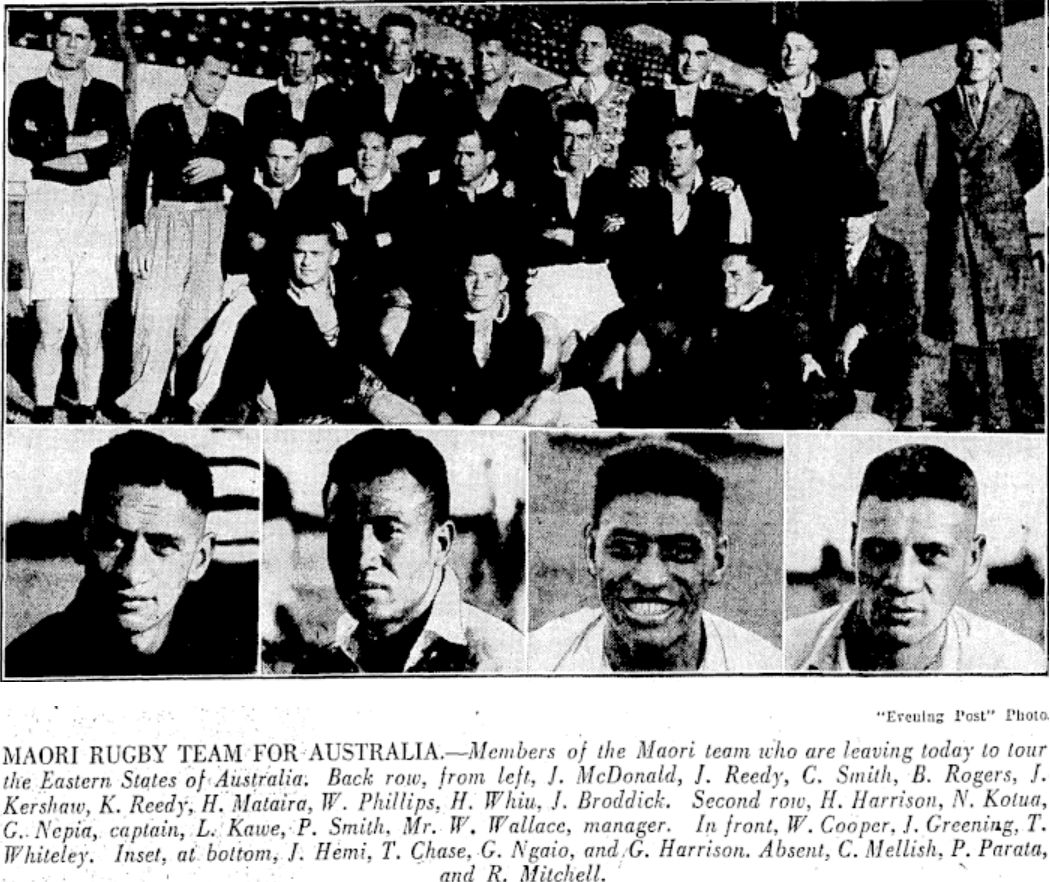

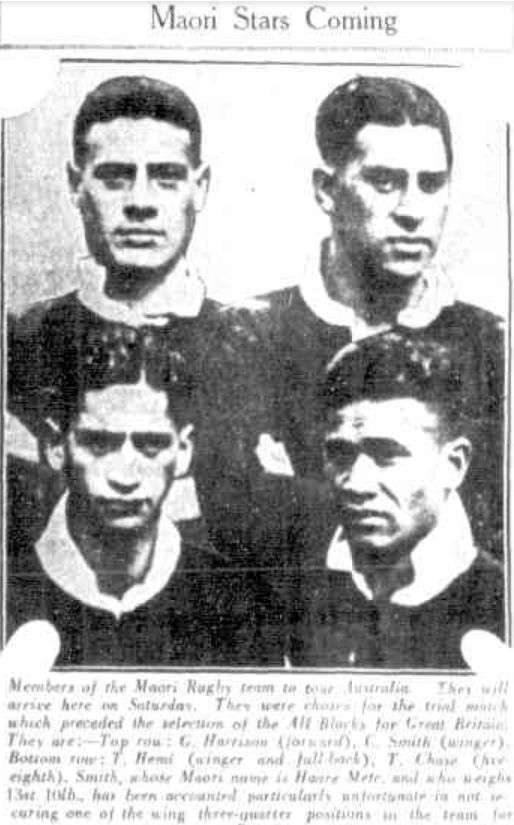
Photographs of Chase, Hemi, Harrison, and Smith in The Labor Daily (Sydney)

Chase was farewelled at a gathering at the Wanganui Metropolitan Rugby Union committee room on June 29. He was presented with a travelling rug by the union, the players and the public. Officials of the union and many clubs all added their congratulations. The same evening he was farewelled at the Ratana club. The evening featured dancing and Mr. T.W. Ratana spoke, saying “he hoped that their guest that night would be true to rugby, true to his race, true to the Ratana movement, and a credit to the whole of New Zealand”. Mr. Ratana gave Chase his Ratana movement badge to wear on the tour which he had worn himself on his tour of the world in 1924-25. He was leaving Marton on the four o’clock express for Wellington on the morning of July 1.

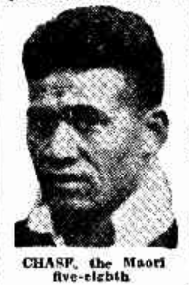
Photo which appeared in the Daily Telegraph (Sydney) on July 5.

In a write up on the Māori players in the Sydney Mail it was written of Chase: “the man who played the best game in the first of the two Maori trials, the one at Hamilton, was T. Chase… this diminutive Maori is the personification of thrust. Give him the ball and he is off the mark like a shot, and his nippiness is calculated to have the Australian inside backs more than a little worried…”. His dop kicking prowess was also highlighted. The team arrived in Sydney on board the Wanganella on July 6.

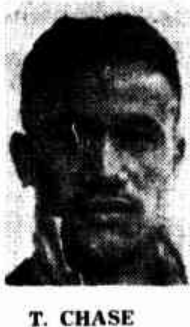
Photo in The Telegraph (Brisbane) on July 11

Chase was named in the five eighths for their tour opener at Warwick on July 10. The team was observed at training the day before and Chase was described as dashing on attack at training, and “looked nippy and elusive”. New Zealand Māori won the match 33-10 before a crowd of 2,000, with Chase at second five. He made a good “dash” early in the game but the defence held on. Then he gathered in midfield, and Hemi, Phillips, and Chase again all handled before Smith went streaking down the line to the 25 yard zone, and shortly after Hemi opened their scoring with a penalty goal. “Chase paved the way for the first try. He passed to McDonald, who reversed to the forwards and Harrison and Rogers handled before Cooper bullocked his way over”. He then initiated another try after “swinging a long pass out to Hemi”, before Smith took the ball and made a great run to score. With one minute left in the game Chase passed to Jack Hemi on halfway who “just danced his way through”, and scored under the posts. It was reported that “Chase and Phillips, at five eighth and standoff half, respectively, combined smartly. Chase being not far behind Hemi in the general excellence of his open play and his cover defence work”.

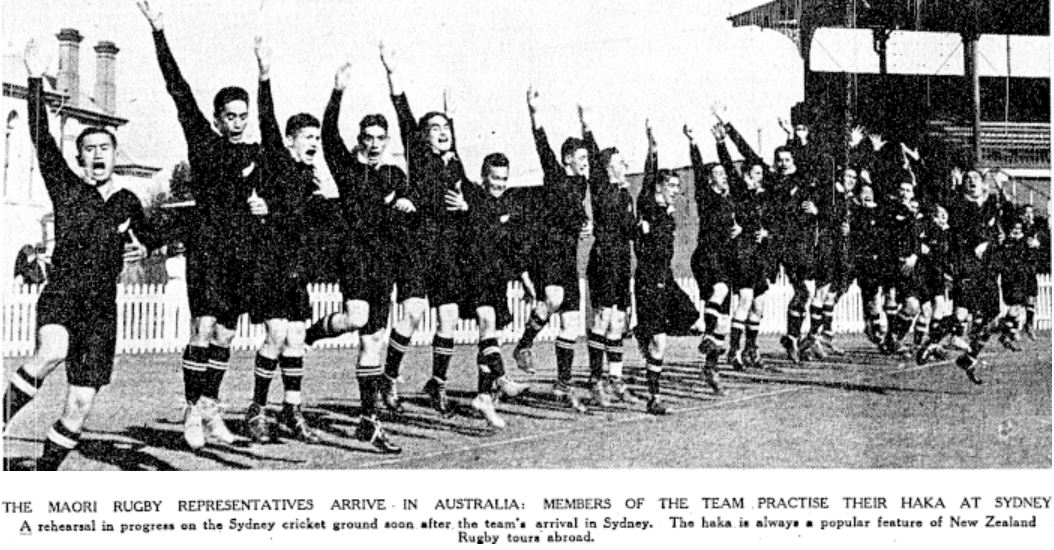
The Māori All Blacks practising the haka at the Sydney Cricket Ground.

In comments about the game it was said “Chase, the clever little five eighth, is worthy of praise, for his job outside of Phillips was a most difficult one. Phillips lacking the necessary speed off the mark that Kotua will show on Saturday”.

It was said that “Chase is too brilliant in attack to be omitted from the side” for their next game against Queensland. However illness was to have a major impact on the Māori tourists at this point. Brothers J and K Reddy were hospitalised in Warwick with influenza, while on Friday night, July 12 Chase, Hawea Mataira, and W Phillips were also hospitalised at St. Helens Hospital in Brisbane. The co-manager, W.J. Wallace was also bedridden with the illness. It meant that Chase had to be replaced in the side for the game against Queensland by Ngaio. It was thought that Chase and Phillips would have to remain in hospital for a day or two. Following the game with Queensland R Harrison and C Smith were also taken to hospital with influenza, while Kotua had a septic leg, and Jack Brodrick had to be taken to a dentist to have an abscessed tooth extracted. Queensland won the match against the depleted side by 39 points to 22.

Chase was still in hospital on the Monday with Smith and Harrison while the others had been discharged. Chase was however ultimately able to leave on the Monday, though C Mellish who had been selected for their next game at halfback then entered the hospital with influenza. Despite being out of hospital Chase was left out of the side that played and beat Toowoomba 35-13 on July 17.

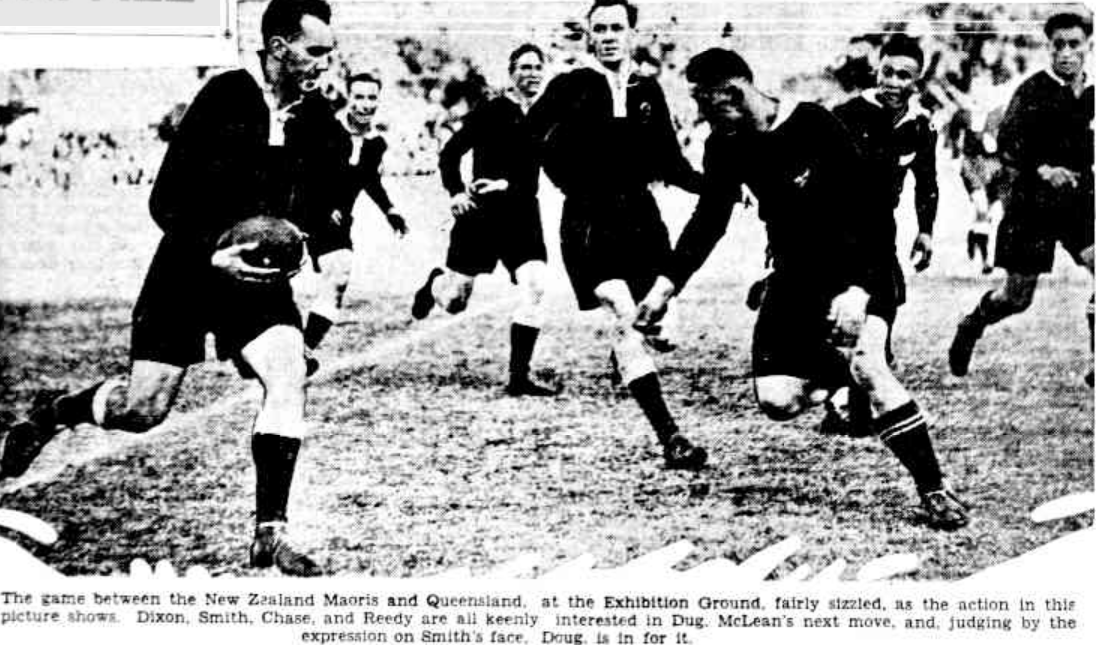

Chase was named in the New Zealand Māori side to play Queensland on July 20 at first five eighth in place of G Ngaia after he was said to have “completely recovered”. The Māori side won 15-13 at the Brisbane Exhibition Ground before a crowd of 10,000. In the first half “Chase was held up as he looked to be through”. He almost scored when “his pace almost beat Hayes for the ball behind the line”. Near the end of the match “Chase was through brilliantly, but cutting out Hemi he threw a long pass to Smith. The winger could not field it and Ward saved” for Queensland. The Māori side did not get much ball overall and as a result Reedy, Chase and Hemi were “not seen at their best”. In comments on the game it was said that “Chase was inclined to kick too often, but the little five eighth soon realised the futility of those tactics unless pressure demanded it and let the ball out smartly”… and that “Chase and Reedy were a safe handling and hard running pair of five eighths”. Chase and Harrison “gave Bennett and Lewis little room in which to” attack. The difference that Phillips, Chase, J Reddy, Mataira, and Brodrick “made to the team was apparent throughout. It was at least a 25 per cent better side”. Phillips, Hemi, Smith, and Chase “were all responsible for outstanding play” in the backline.

The New Zealand Māori side then travelled to New South Wales for their game against Central West NSW in Dubbo on July 24. Chase was initially named to play on the wing but came out on to the field at five eighth. The Maori side won 38-3 before 2,000 spectators with Chase scoring one of their ten tries. With the score 16-3 near halftime Chase “broke away, but slipped over”. In the first half a try was scored following “splendid combination between Chase, the outside five-eighth, Nēpia… and Harrison, … [with] a pretty exchange of passes resulting in Harrison scoring”. Chase was later involved in a movement with Hemi which saw Ngaia score. He was involved with Mellish and Len Kawe in a “brilliant movement” which saw Kawe tackled “inched from the line”. Following a break by Harrison he sent the ball “along to Chase, who ran over between the posts to score”. Soon after Nepia “dashed away and sent to Chase, the little five eighth going to the 25 before being toppled”. Midway through the second half the Māori side made a dribbling rush and Chase collected the ball and “streaked over, only to lose the ball”. Then later he “wound his way through the opposition and was careering for the scoring area when Ryan downed him with a splendid tackle”. It was commented that Chase “is quick off the mark, and shone in attack”. And “was an effective pivot for attack as five eighth”.

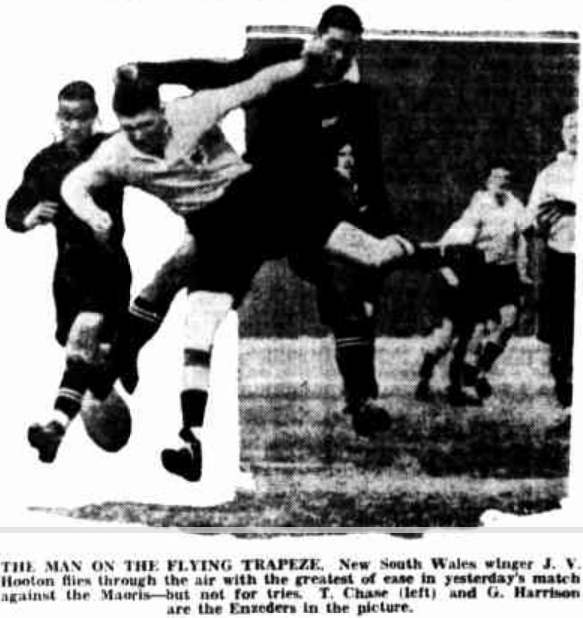
Chase in the back on the left chasing the play against NSW on July 27.

Selectors Kingi Tawhi and Billy Wallace named Chase at second five eighth for their next game with New South Wales. New Zealand Māori won 6-5 at the Sydney Cricket Ground on July 27 before a large crowd of 28,811. Chase didn’t play particularly in the tight match with it said that “Chase and J Reddy are not the star pivots one expected and centre Hemi lacked the anticipated thrust”. He “gave glimpses of ability, without showing up to any extent” along with some of their other backs. Part of the problem was that “J.C. Reddy, the first five eighth, could not get going, and consequently jarred the rhythm of the passing moves and limited Tom Chase’s chances to shine”.

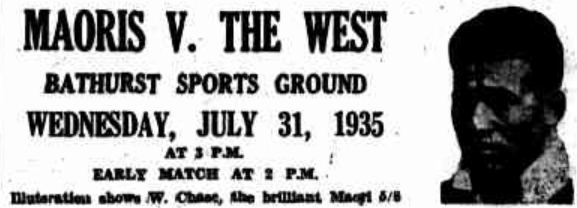

He played at second five eighth in their next game against Western NSW at Bathurst on July 31. In an advertisement for the game a photograph of Chase was used to promote the game. New Zealand Māori won 42-8 before 3,000 spectators with Chase scoring a try and kicking a drop goal. At five eighth he “opened up the play well, gave sharp passes, and kept in the movement after giving the transfer. He had a good colleague in Kotua”. With the score 11-8 early in the second half Chase “kicked a neat goal from the field” and this opened the floodgates with the Māori side scoring 27 points “in less than that many minutes”.

Chase played at five eighth in their next match against Victoria at Carlton. New Zealand Māori won 28 to 16 before a crowd of 15,000. Chase was involved in a spectacular try which was instigated by Nēpia when he collected the ball on his goal line and cut through the Victorian team. Down field he “transferred to Chase and was up in time for the return pass. Phillips came infield and Nēpia drew Westfield to send Phillips in a clear run home”. When the score was 11-5 Chase hurt himself when making a tackle but was OK to resume after play had been stopped for a few minutes. Not long after Chase made a break before kicking but Westfield marked and carried the ball dead meaning a five metre scrum which Kotua kicked a field goal from. N Kotua at five eighth “played a splendid game and was well supported by Chase”. Following the game the team for the New South Wales match was named and Kotua had moved into Chase’s second five position with Chase omitted. It turned out that the injury he sustained was a sprained ankle and this ruled him out of the next match.

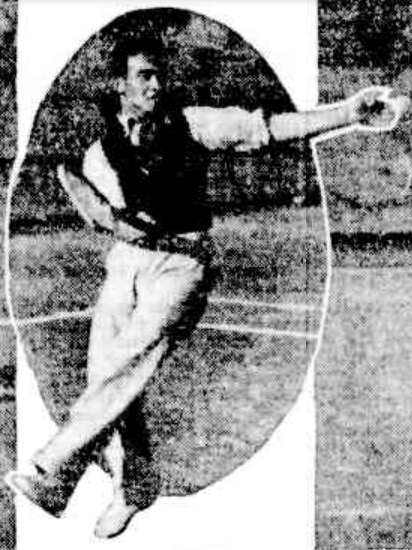
Chase playing tennis at Rushcutters Bay in Sydney against team mates.

They were due to play the same New South Wales side five days later on August 10 and Chase was named in the squad but ultimately he had not recovered enough to play. The night before the game it was reported that “the three five eighths in the Maori side – T. Chase, J. Reddy, and W. Kotua – are all on the injured list. There is still a chance that Chase will play, but last night the condition of his injured ankle was such that his presence in today’s team was not expected”.

Chase was ok to play in the final game of the Australian part of the tour which was against Newcastle District on August 14 at the Newcastle Sports Ground. The Māori team won 11-0 after leading 5-0 at halftime. Chase was injured again when he was kicked on the ankle and he was replaced by J.C. Reedy in the second half.

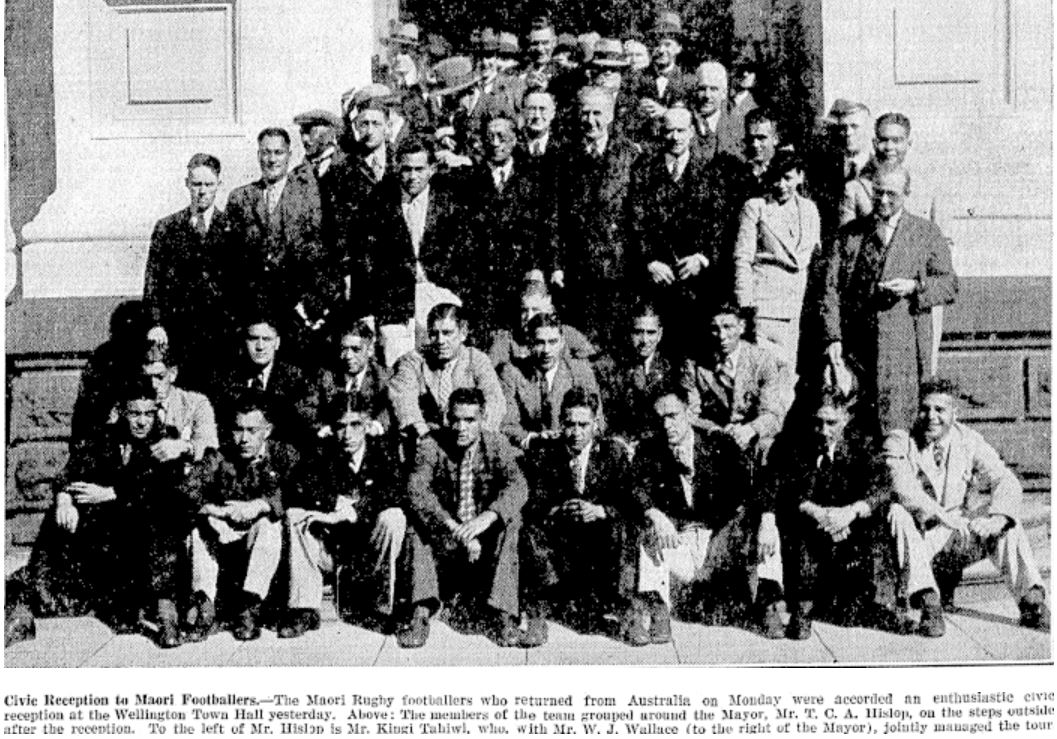
At a civic reception outside the Wellington Town Hall before their game against Wellington on 21 August.

The side then returned to New Zealand, arriving in Wellington on August 20. They were welcomed by the mayor, T.C.A. Hislop at the Town Hall. The following day the side played against Wellington at Athletic Park with Chase named in the five eighths. Wellington won the game 11-9 with 9,000 spectators in “cold and bleak” weather with a strong southerly wind blowing down the ground. In their backs “H. Harrison, Chase, and Ngaia, were jinking about continuously, and were as slippery as eels”. Early in the match “Chase and Rogers took the ball at toe a good distance down the field, but Crisp cleared”. When they trailed 4-0 Chase was involved in a movement which put them on attack with Rogers and Cooper but it ultimately didn’t lead to points. Later in the half “the ball went from H. Harrison to Chase, who tossed it into a bunch of forwards, Brodrick taking it deep into Wellington’s twenty five. Nepia was spearhead of another thrust, in which Chase, C. Smith, and Ngaia all shared, the last named scoring in the corner”. The try coming after Chase had kicked through for Harrison who then moved the ball on. The Māori side scored three tries in the match but lost to two drop goals and a penalty. The penalty was given away by Chase who was offside in front of their own posts, with the drop goal to win the game coming close to full time. The side then travelled to Auckland to play the Auckland side but Chase was not involved and it is most likely that he caught the train back to Wanganui.

The same day of the game, August 24, Chase appeared for his Ratana club side in their match against Marist. His appearance in the side was said to have inspired them to their 19-9 victory. The following week he “was the central figure” for Ratana in a 16-11 win where he scored two tries and kicked a drop goal.

Chase was selected on the left wing for the Wanganui team to play Hawke’s Bay at Marton on September 4 but he ultimately played in the five eighths with D Jones. Wanganui were thrashed 29 to 3. Early in the game “Chase and Bullock-Douglan” gained some ground, but Hawke’s Bay were getting possession from the scrums”. Wanganui scored a try to Jones but Chase missed the conversion. Later they made a break in the backs but Chase was “grassed by Rolls”. Chase played in Ratana’s loss against Pirates on September 7 in the final of the Charity Cup competition. They lost 5-3 with Chase who was captaining the side kicking their lone penalty.

During the following week the Wanganui Rugby Union nominated Chase for the North Island team in the positions of five eighth, centre, wing, or fullback. He was also named the same week in the five eighths for Wanganui’s September 14 game against Manawatu at Feilding. Wanganui lost 25 to 11. Chase was opposed by Eric Fletcher who had recently returned to rugby union in the Manawatu after moving to Auckland and playing rugby league for Richmond Rovers from 1934 to 1936, and also representing New Zealand in one test in 1935. In the second half Chase kicked a penalty and then on fulltime converted a try to Campbell. Wanganui’s last game of the year was against Wellington on September 25. Chase was one of 21 players asked to keep fit by training for the match. However he was ultimately not named in either the starting fifteen or the four reserve players.

==== Return to Huia and injury marred season (1936) ====
The 1936 season saw Chase play very little rugby due to injuries sustained at various times in the year. He only played four games for the Huia club where he had returned to, one game for Wanganui Māori, one for Wanganui, and one for Taihape Māori. His first confirmed game was against Utiku on May 16 where he didn’t “reveal his true form”, but scored their only points in a 9-3 loss. In a 6-6 draw with Pirates he kicked a penalty goal. He was at centre “but did not get much chance”. Chase was selected on the wing in Wanganui’s first representative game of the season against Taranaki at Spriggens Park on May 30. Wanganui lost 17 to 9 with Chase scoring their only try. His try came when Taranaki dropped the ball and he “snapped the ball up, cut in between the Taranaki centre and wing and outpaced Collins to the goal to score”. Chase and Bullock-Douglas were said to have been weak defensively with Chase beaten twice and Bullock-Douglas three times.

Chase then missed Huia’s next two games against Hautapu and Old Boys with no reason given. In the game with Old Boys the side played three men short. He did play the weekend after on June 13 and kicked a conversion and penalty but overall kicked badly with several easy conversion misses in a 21-20 loss to Mangaweka. He “nevertheless played an excellent game as did also his brother Rangi Chase, who was outstanding…”. Chase was selected on the wing for Wanganui’s King’s Birthday match against Manawatu on June 23 at Spriggens Park. However he sent word the morning of the game that he would be unavailable and he was replaced by Jones.

Chase was available for Wanganui Māori two days later on Thursday for their annual match against Taranaki Māori for the Tuera Shield at Waitara. He was five eighths and captain with his brother Rangi at centre. Wanganui Māori lost 18 to 9 before 2,000 spectators. Near the end of the first half T. Chase “who had been playing a brilliant game at second five eighth, retired and in the hope of him returning Wanganui Wanganui played with 14 man for the remainder of the spell. He, however, had injured his shoulder”. Chase then missed Huia’s game against Pirates and Taihape’s game against Rangitikei on July 1. It was reported that his brother Rangi was playing in the five eighths in his place due to injuries. He was reported to be fully fit again by July 18 and was named in the Taihape team to play Wanganui Metropolitan at the same time. However he didn’t play in the match. He had been named in the Wanganui squad to play Waikato around the same time. But had still not fully recovered and did not get selected in their side to play.

Chase finally made his return to the playing field at fullback in a friendly match between Huia and Ngatamatea on September 12, nearly two and a half months later. He played one further game before the end of the 1936 season. It was for Taihape Māori against Tokeenu-Ratana Māori on September 26. He scored a try in their 16-5 win and was said to have “played well” along with brother, Rangi. In a review of the season it was noted that he was only able to play in one of the ten games that the Wanganui representative side played during the year.

==== Final season of rugby union (1937) ====
The 1937 season saw Tommy Chase switch to rugby league after being signed by the Manukau rugby league club in Auckland mid season. Before leaving he played 5 games for Huia as well as single games for Taihape Country, Taihape, and Wanganui.

His opening game of the year was for Huia against Hautapu on April 24. He then kicked a conversion and a penalty in a 18-8 loss to Utiku a week later. Chase kicked a conversion in their third game which was a win over Pirates 13-3 playing at centre. He was then selected in the Taihape Country team to play Taihape Town in a midweek game on May 12 which was Coronation Day. Country beat Town 20 to 9 to win the McCartin Cup with Chase kicking two penalties. He was also involved in a try to Marshall near the end after throwing the final pass. Then days later he scored a try and kicked a conversion for Huia in a 22-9 victory over Hautapu. The match report said “this match was a triumph for Rangi and Tommy Chase, who played with perfect understanding and were always a thorn in the side of the opposition. Tommy’s try came after he “put in a run that left the opposition standing” and overall put in a “dashing display”.

It was reported on June 2 that Rangi Chase had received a “tempting offer to play league football in Auckland and was considering the matter”. With league being an amateur sport in Auckland at this time it is likely that he was being offered an employment opportunity in addition to joining the side. On June 6 both the brothers turned out for Taihape in a game against Wanganui Metropolitan for the Pownall Trophy. They lost 16 to 3 in wet weather. The pair were the “pick of the maroon rearguard”. With Tommy displaying “some of his old-time versatility as centre”.

Chase was then named at fullback in the Wanganui side to play Manawatu. It was to be his last game of rugby union. Wanganui lost 10-8 in nice weather at Spriggens Park. In the first half Chase “with an elusive side-step, tricked both Buick and Louisson to make a run into Manawatu territory”. Later he made a “sure tackle” to prevent a try. Towards the end of the match Chase brought Waugh down heavily after he “caught him by the toes in a beautiful tackle” and Waugh suffered a broken collarbone.

=== Rugby League ===
==== Move to Auckland, joining Manukau rugby league ====
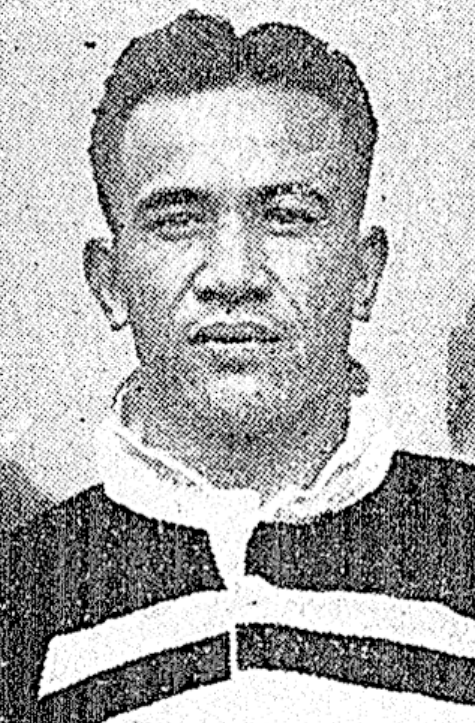
Chase in a Manukau jersey.

On June 14 it was reported that “Taihape Rugby in general, and the Huia Football Club in particular, have suffered a severe loss in the departure of Tommy and Rangi Chase for Auckland to play league football. These two prominent footballers left on Friday [June 11] by car for the Queen City”. The New Zealand Herald wrote “within the last week two outstanding members of the New Zealand Māori team which visited Australia in 1935 have decided to change over to the league code. Hawea Mataira, the Hawke’s Bay and New Zealand representative, will play for the City club today, while the latest convert is T. Chase, of Taihape, who will represent Manukau against Richmond in the principal attraction at Carlaw Park this afternoon. Chase is a brilliant five eighths and he should prove a decided acquisition to the league game… considerable interest will centre in their performances”.

The match between Manukau and Richmond was between the 1936 first grade champions (Manukau) and the Richmond side that would go on to win the 1937 championship. Richmond won the game 22-18 with Tommy’s brother Rangi scoring three tries and also kicking a drop goal. It was said that Tommy marked Ted Mincham on the wing particularly well. Mincham was the current New Zealand winger. He was said to have “showed promise of developing into a fine league player” and that he and his brother “have undoubtedly strengthened Manukau considerably”. During the following week both brothers were officially registered with Manukau. In a very unique situation the following weekend saw six of the Auckland clubs travel around the North Island to play various sides. Tommy Chase travelled with the Manukau team to play Bay of Plenty at Taneatua. Manukau won 51 to 33 with Tommy scoring two tries and Rangi three. Jack Hemi, Tommy’s New Zealand Māori team mate was also in the side and he scored a try and kicked nine goals. While another former New Zealand Māori team mate, Jack Brodrick scored twice. Tommy scored two more tries for Manukau in a 31-11 win against North Shore the next weekend in round 8 of the championship. The Auckland Star wrote “once more it was demonstrated just what an asset the Chase brothers… are … they were continually in the picture…. Quick to dart through the gap they were a continual thorn in the side of the Shore backs. Both were in fine form, but the beautifully built R. Chase was perhaps a trifle more polished than his more stocky brother. Their fine understanding of each other’s play was a feature, and they seemed equally at home at second five eighths and centre when they elected frequently to exchange positions”.

In a July 10 win over Marist Old Boys by 20 to 13 he stood out “for fine defence”. Then in round 10 Manukau won 22-5 against Newton Rangers on Carlaw Park #2 field. Chase played second five eighth to enable Wilson, a new recruit from the Bay of Plenty to play first five eighth. The Chase brothers “were associated in good play, from which two tries were scored” in the first half, and the two “played fine football on attack” throughout.

After the game the Auckland Māori team was selected to play Waikato Māori midweek but both Tommy and Rangi were said to be unavailable. In round 11 Manukau beat Ponsonby 18-6 with the Chase brothers and Walter Brimble “in possession and combination gave a lot of speed and colour to the Manukau attack”. Tommy was at centre and was “prominent, and he used good judgement with his kicks”.

==== New Zealand trial ====
Remarkably after just six games of rugby league both Tommy and Rangi were selected in the New Zealand trial match at Carlaw Park on July 28. They were partnered in the five eighths in the Probables side. The Auckland Star said it would be “interesting to see how the Chase brothers compare with the Richmond five eighths, [Noel] Bickerton and [Wally] Tittleton. Tommy was selected at first five eighths which was said to be “an experiment so far as Auckland football is concerned. With the Manukau club Chase has played centre threequarter, but he has a good record as a first five eighths with the New Zealand Māori team in Australia in 1935. The Probables team lost 25-11 on a muddy ground and it was said that “Bickerton and W. Tittleton made a better five eighths line than the Chase brothers…” although Rangi “was the best scoring back on the ground”. The Chase brothers “played good football”, and Rangi was changed to the Possibles side at halftime scoring three tries. Tommy “did an amount of good work on defence, but he was overshadowed by Bickerton. Coincidentally the Chase brothers met with Bickerton and Tittleton just three days later when Manukau played Richmond in round 12 of the championship on July 31. The match was drawn 11-11. Jack Hemi was out injured so Tommy and Puti Tipene Watene did the goal kicking but neither did well. He did “combine well” with his brother however. At times though he “overdid the cutting in and was frequently caught in possession”. Rangi played a brilliant game and was named in the New Zealand team to play the touring Australia side.

==== New Zealand Māori selection ====
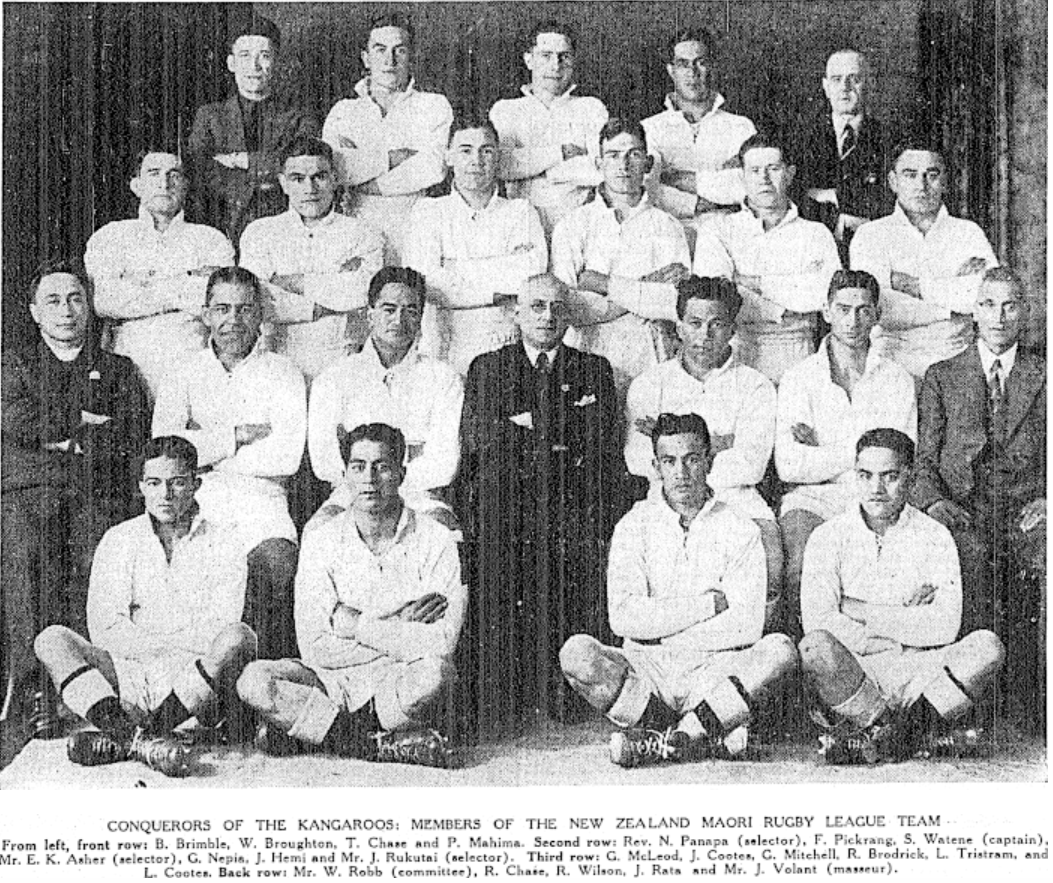

With the Australian side on a very short tour of New Zealand they were to play three games, two against New Zealand and one against New Zealand Māori in between. It was the first ever match between New Zealand Māori and Australia. Tommy was named at first five eighth for the New Zealand Maori side for their August 11 game at Carlaw Park. Chase was marking a famous Australian player, Wally Prigg who played nineteen tests and captained Australia in seven.

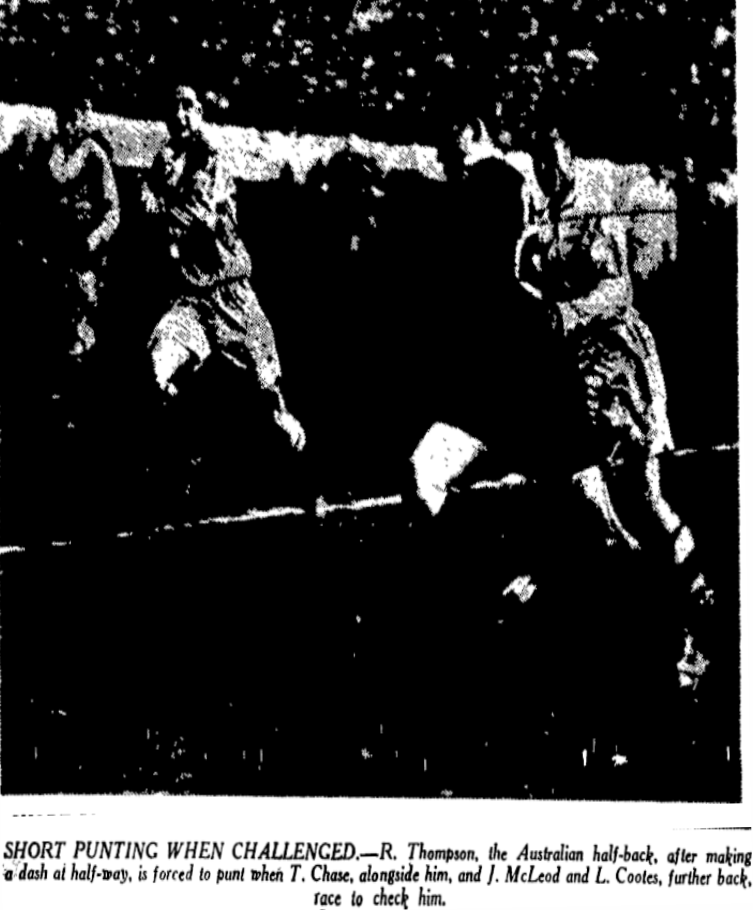
Tommy Chase to the right in pursuit of Roy Thompson the Australian halfback.

The New Zealand Māori side secured a historic victory in a “tough match” by 16 points to 5. Rangi played five eighths with Tommy and scored one of their tries. The attendance was estimated at about 11,000. Tommy and Rangi “combined nicely behind the scrum”. Late in the first half Tommy knocked on when Rangi had a clear run in though they still led 7-0 at halftime.

A week and a half later when the Auckland competition resumed the Chase brothers were back in the Manukau side. Tommy kicked his first goals for Manukau in a 20-19 loss to Mount Albert. They scored three tries all of which he converted, along with two penalties. Jack Hemi was absent through injury so Tommy played fullback where he “gave good service”. The Herald wrote he gave a “sound exhibition” but missed a penalty on fulltime which would have won them the game. In the final round of the championship Manukau lost 23-20 to City Rovers with Chase kicking three conversions and one penalty and he “showed up with speed and elusive running”. He then kicked another three conversions in Manukau’s 35-18 loss to Mount Albert in round one of the Roope Rooster knockout competition. Manukau then beat Newton 17-15 in the Phelan Shield with Chase amongst the best backs for Manukau.

Chase was then selected to make his debut for the Auckland Māori side to play North Auckland Māori on September 14 for the Waitangi Shield. He was named at fullback. Auckland Māori won 37 to 3 with Chase scoring two tries and converting five of their nine tries. He then played for Manukau in the Phelan Shield knockout semifinal which they lost 16-10 to North Shore. Chase kicked a conversion and a penalty and was “the outstanding figure” along with Jack Brodrick.

Chase was selected in the 18 man New Zealand Māori training squad on September 29 to play Auckland on October 9. When the side to play was named Chase was at second five eighth with Noel Bickerton at first five eighth. They were opposed by John Donald and Wally Stockley. The Māori side was essentially an Auckland Māori side with virtually all players from the local area. At halfback was Wilfred Brimble, ironically not Māori at all with an English father and Bantu mother from South Africa. He “gave a sharp and good service from the scrum and Bickerton and Chase were prominent on occasions”. Chase kicked a penalty for his side in a 43-21 win. George Nēpia did the majority of the goal kicking. Chase’s penalty came early in the game and in the second half he “made a nice dash” which ultimately led to Jack Tristram scoring.

==== Manukau and Auckland (1938) ====
It was reported Chase would once again be playing for Manukau in 1938, along with his brother Rangi. His season began in a preseason game for Manukau against a South Auckland XIII (Waikato) side at Waikaraka Park in Onehunga where Manukau was based. Manukau won 32-6 with Chase scoring a try and converting four of their eight tries. They then played Ponsonby in a preseason game on April 2 which Manukau won 19-11. Chase kicked a conversion, three penalties, and a drop goal and “gave a good exhibition at fullback”. The Herald wrote that “a feature of the game was the brilliant play of T. Chase… his tricky running often eluded the defence and he rarely failed to start the backs in passing movements. Chase kicked some fine goals, and near the end of the game dropped a magnificent field goal”.

In round 1 of the championship, Manukau lost 19-8 to Newton. Chase scored one of their tries and kicked a conversion. For his try he sidestepped his way through to score and was “the best back” for Manukau. His brother Rangi was playing his first game of the year, but got injured early. Chase scored two more tries in a 26-21 round 2 win over North Shore. He and Hemi “were responsible for several runs in the second half." Chase also “stood out for some work in defence, but on several occasions he held on when R Wilson had a good chance of scoring”. He was on the wing for their next match against Marist which they won 18-4. He and Wilson on the opposite wing “showed fine enterprise”. And he was “the pick of the wing three-quarters, doing a lot of useful work”. Then in a 17-9 win over Mount Albert in round 5, Tommy and Rangi “teamed well”. Manukau had another win, 18-16 over Richmond on May 14 with Chase on the wing being “prominent in some nice attacking moves”.

==== New Zealand Trials ====
Chase was selected in the reserves for the Auckland team to play the Rest of the North Island on May 18. The match was to help the selectors choose the New Zealand team to tour Australia. He was not required to play but then was named in a Probables side to play the Possibles as curtain-raiser to the North Island inter island match with the South Island on May 21 at Carlaw Park. When the game was played Chase was in fact in the Possibles team which won 25 to 21 and he scored two tries on the wing. He was “outstanding” along with Verdun Scott and Robert Grotte and they “gave a good display of passing and outclassed the Probables”. The Herald added that “T. Chase, who is one of the best utility players in the code, was impressive on the wing and must be considered unlucky to be left out of the New Zealand team”. The Auckland Star also said that as a utility player he would have been useful and “was unlucky to be passed over”. His brother, Rangi was selected in the 22 man squad to make the tour in the three quarters.

Chase returned to the Manukau side for their 23-19, round 7 win. In the first half “a brilliant run by T.Chase caught the City backs unawares and Jack Broughton scored a nice try”. He was “perhaps the best of the backs, and did some great work on attack”. Then against Papakura the following weekend he kicked two conversions and a penalty in a surprise 18-15 loss in the early game at Carlaw Park. It was Papakura’s first ever first grade championship win. Manukau was considerably weakened as five of their team had left with the New Zealand side to tour Australia. In addition to Tommy’s brother, Rangi, other players were Jack Hemi, Jack Brodrick, Angus Gault, and Walter Brimble.

==== Auckland Māori ====
Chase was chosen in the Auckland Māori team to play Auckland Pākehā on King’s Birthday (June 6) at fullback. The Herald noted that “it will be interesting to watch the form of T. Chase, who was regarded as one of the strongest contenders for a place in the New Zealand team”. Chase played at centre with the Māori side winning 26-21. With the score tied at 21-21 towards the end Chase “threw a long pass over the heads of his opponents to Bickerton, who ran in to score under the posts, and Chase converted”. Chase had been “cornered” and his pass was a long one infield. He also kicked two other conversions and a penalty. In the first half when the score was 8-8 Verdun Scott hit the post with a penalty attempt by the Pākehā side and Chase brought the ball back to the other end with a “great run” but Martin Hansen lost the ball after he joined in. His penalty later levelled the scores once more at 16-16. After Auckland went behind 21-16 it looked as though they might have lost their chance but a try to Pita Ririnui which Chase converted before the final try he set up and his conversion gave them the victory. In comments on the game it was said that “Chase was always in the picture at centre and he was more than useful as a goal-kicker”.

Returning to Manukau he kicked a penalty in a 13-5 loss to Ponsonby. He was playing at fullback in Jack Hemi’s absence. He was “very sound” in the position and “his tackling was beyond reproach”.They had a 5-2 win over Newton but then lost heavily 37-7 to North Shore in round 11 on June 25. Chase converted their only try and kicked a penalty. His tackling was said to be “an object lesson” and “his splendid fielding and good kicking often got his side out of difficulties”. The Auckland Star wrote “T. Chase gave a fine exhibition … and was called on to do more work than the average full-back gets in a month. Chase got his man every time when there was a reasonable chance of doing to, and a hopeless day for Manukau did not seem to depress him”. Manukau who were really struggling without their New Zealand players then lost to Marist 24-3. Once again Chase “was a tower of strength at fullback and it was not his fault that eight tries were scored”. The game was played in a “quagmire” at Carlaw Park and the Star wrote “T. Chase continues to be their best back, and but for his excellent defence the tide would have flowed more strongly against his side”.

==== Auckland v New Zealand ====
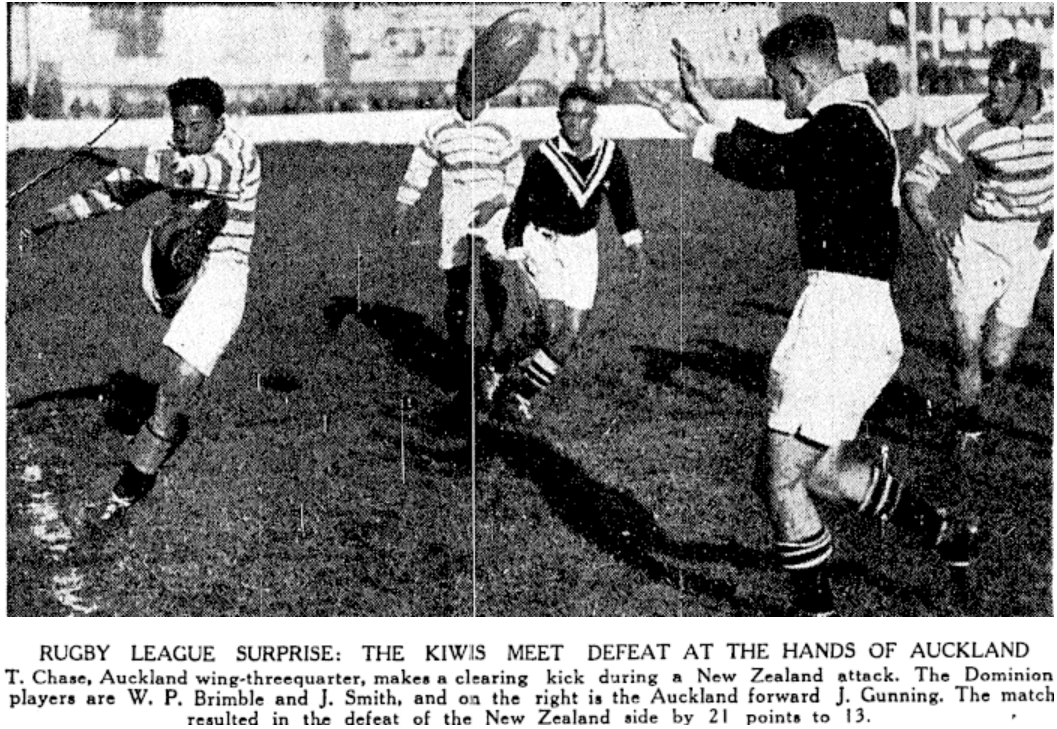

Following the return of the New Zealand team from Australia they were scheduled to play a match against Auckland at Carlaw Park on July 16. Chase was named in the Auckland side on the wing. The Auckland Star said that the three quarter line will include Brian Riley, who was not available for the Australian tour, T. Chase “the mercurial Manukau wing, who is deserving of a place in any New Zealand team, and Verdun Scott…”. The match was played before 15,000 spectators and saw Auckland win 21-13 with Tommy kicking a conversion and a penalty while his brother, Rangi scored a try for New Zealand. The Auckland centre play “lacked speed” so the wings were not put into position to attack well from. So in the second half Tommy “was shifted infield to exchange places with Scott, and it was from that point the tide began to flow strongly in Auckland’s favour. It was then that T, Chase rose to dazzling heights, and his mercurial dash and side step often got the New Zealand defence in a sad tangle”. Chase was positioned outside Bob Banham who was at first five eighth. Banham was an Australian who had come to New Zealand to provide coaching assistance to various club sides as well as playing. He would go on to represent New Zealand along with Tommy the following year. While outside Banham Chase “nonplussed the defence by his sharp bursts through. He played a very fine game and again showed how unlucky he was to have missed selection in the New Zealand team”. Just before halftime Chase “raced round the blind side and passed to [Joseph] Gunning who scored”. In the second half he “made a brilliant opening and Clarrie Peterson scored a nice try” which Chase converted”. The Herald wrote later that “it was a wise move to bring T. Chase closer to the scrum… [his] nippiness and speed off the mark gave the back line penetration which was lacking in the first half”.

With their New Zealand players back, Manukau beat City 18-4 in round 14 on July 23. The Chase brothers “got few chances, but both played well”. Manukau then drew with Richmond 6-6. The Chase brothers “were prominent on defence” and “played well in a solid way”. Manukau had a big 31-5 win against Mt Albert on August 6. Tommy “combined effectively and made several openings, which resulted in tries”. His “perfect understanding” with Peter Mahima gave Rangi a chance to show his brilliance at centre on attack.

His form saw him selected on the left wing for Auckland in their match against Canterbury on August 13. Auckland won the match 28-22. Shortly after half time Chase broke through and passed the ball to brother, Rangi who “forced his way past Boniface and scored wide out” and with Jack Hemi’s conversion Auckland retook the lead 13-12.

In Manukau’s final game of the championship they won 26-14 against Ponsonby. They finished fourth in the Fox Memorial competition, five points behind winners Marist. Losing their New Zealand players for five matches, four of which they lost proving costly. Tommy made a good run with Rangi and as a result Pile scored a try for them. Tommy was at fullback and “played well”.

Manukau began the Roope Rooster competition with a game against Papakura at their Prince Edward Park ground in Papakura. Manukau won 28-6 with Chase scoring two tries. His first try came after receiving the ball from Walter Brimble, while the second saw him take a pass from Jack Brodrick to score. He was “outstanding”, playing a “brilliant game” at fullback. Manukau then lost to City 16-8 in the semi finals. Chase “made a nice opening” and the ball was passed “along the whole line and Pile scored”. Chase later crossed the line but the try was disallowed due to an obstruction. The Herald wrote that he was “the best of the backs and was always dangerous”. Manukau then moved into the consolation knockout competition, the Phelan Shield, and beat Mount Albert 26-17. Chase played at fullback and “started several clever movements which resulted in tries”. He “played a splendid game and repeatedly saved his team by clever individual work”. They then beat Ponsonby 26-8 in the semi final on September 24. The game was the curtain raiser to Marist against the touring Eastern Suburbs club side from Sydney. They had finished runner up in the NSW competition. Chase was at fullback and “played a splendid game. His kicking and fielding were faultless”.

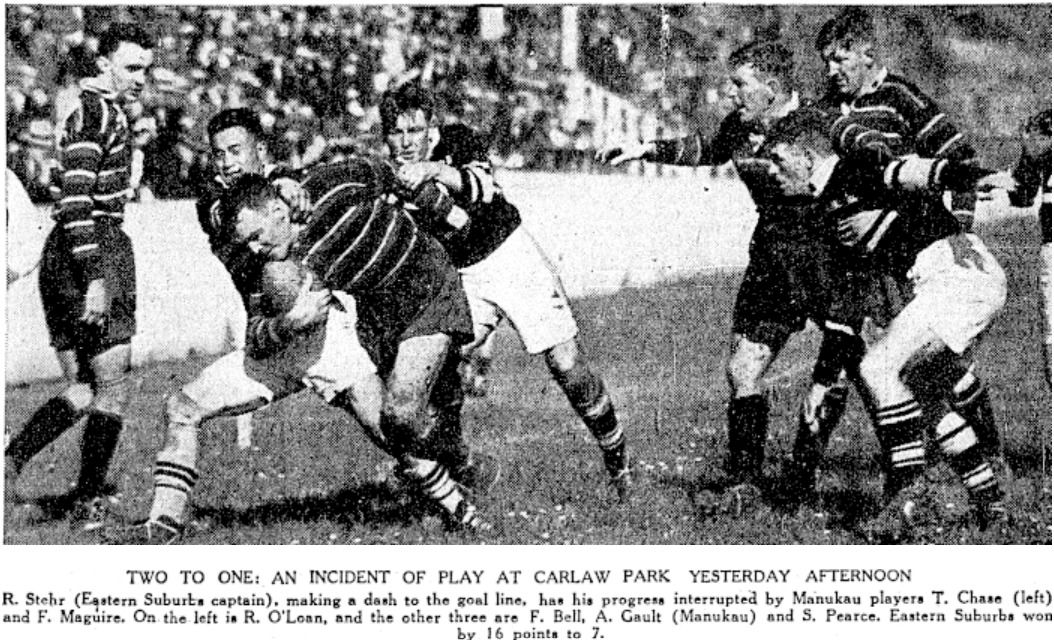

Manukau played the touring Eastern Suburbs side during the following week on September 28 with Chase selected in the fullback position once more. Fullback for Eastern Suburbs was J. Norton. Manukau who was missing Jack Hemi and losing Jack Brodrick to a shoulder injury was beaten 16-7. Chase kicked a conversion and penalty. He missed two penalties early in the game, but kicked one from 30 yards later to make the score 10-2 at halftime. He then converted Pita Ririnui’s try from wide out. Then a minute later he had an easy chance to kick a penalty to narrow the score to 10-9 but missed. The Herald wrote that if Hemi had been available Manukau might have won due to the better goal kicking and that Chase was “not so good as usual and his weak tackling gave the visitors a try”. His final game of the season was against Papakura in the Phelan Shield final which they won 18-8. It was curtain raiser to the Richmond – Eastern Suburbs game which Richmond won with 11,000 spectators at Carlaw Park. For Manukau Chase kicked two conversions and a penalty.

=== New Zealand selection, Manukau, and Auckland Māori (1939) ===
==== Manukau ====
The 1939 season began very early in order to complete much of it before the New Zealand team to tour England was selected. Manukau’s first game was on April 1 against Ponsonby. Manukau lost 29-22 with Chase kicking two conversions and three penalties, and he was “very solid at fullback”. He was selected to play for Manukau against the touring Sydney XIII side. The side was originally going to be Eastern Suburbs once more but it included several players from other teams due to availability issues. Manukau lost 23-10. Chase played well on the wing and was said to be their best back along with Peter Mahima at halfback. During the second half Chase's opposite, R. O'Loan beat fullback George Nepia “but when a try looked certain Chase came fast and pushed O’Loan into touch”.

Manukau then resumed their championship games with a 20-0 win over Papakura on April 22. Chase scored one of their four tries. His try came after Angus Gault and Pita Ririnui had made ground down field. Chase was then involved in a break with Jack Hemi and Jack Brodrick enabling Peter Mahima to score. Overall he was said to have played “excellent football”. He scored two more tries in a 23-7 win over North Shore a week later. He had moved into second five eighth and “gave a brilliant display in a position which appears to suit him much better than wing three quarter” and showed “exceptional penetrative play”. The Herald wrote that he was “the outstanding back on the ground” and “throughout the match he was a thorn in the side of the opposition and did great work both on attack and defence. He scored two brilliant tries as a result of clever anticipation and good understanding with [Cyril] Wiberg, the halfback”. He “has a most effective sidestep and swerve which nonplussed the opposition on more than one occasion”.

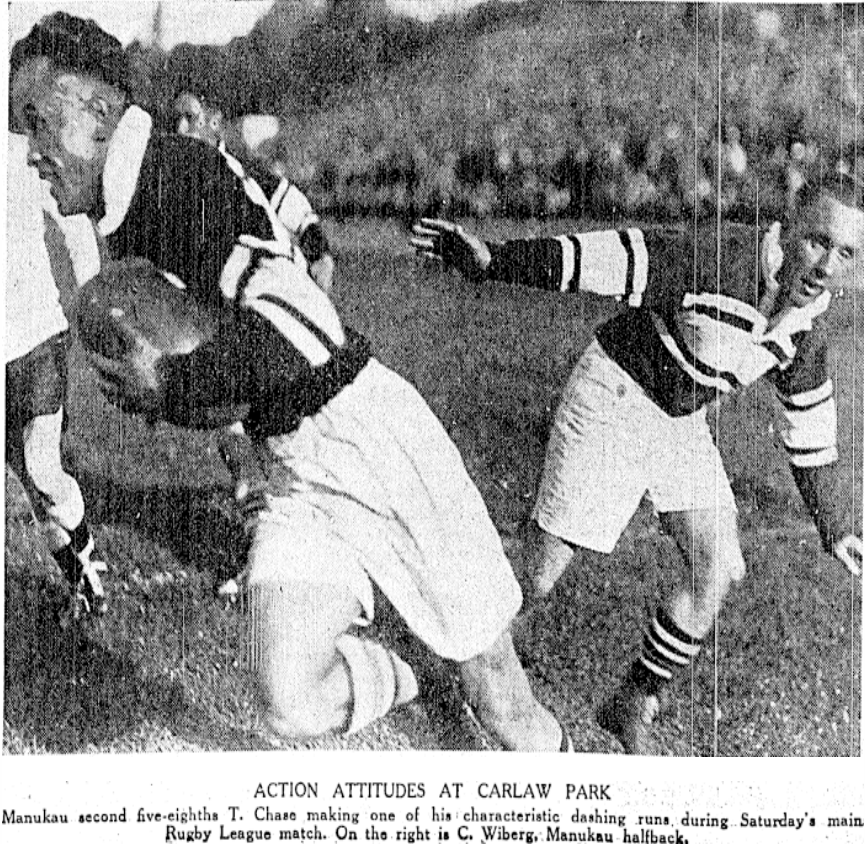

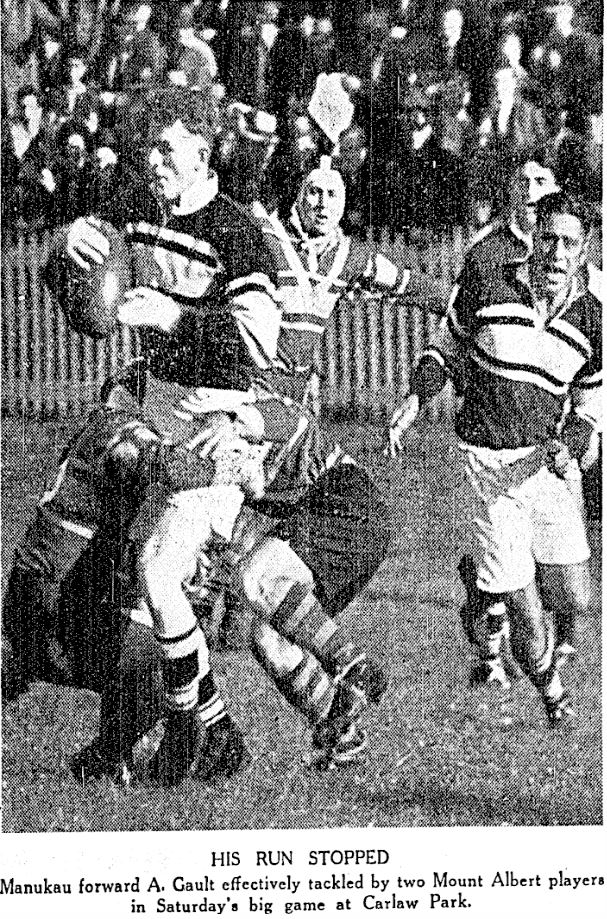
Chase in support of Angus Gault on May 6

Chase scored again in a 38-15 loss to Mount Albert in round 5. He “did some excellent solo attacking work”. His try came after George Nēpia “feinted to kick. Suddenly he swung a long overarm pass well across the field. T. Chase gained possession and beat three opponents to score a spectacular try”. Chase was at second five eighth again and although “closely watched” he “showed brilliance with the slightest chance” and was “again the best back for Manukau”.

He was moved back to the left wing for their 15-5 loss to Richmond. The Auckland Star said “T. Chase, whose lively side-step is off his left foot” and that he was “correctly positioned at left wing three quarter”. Though the Herald wrote that he played a good game but “it was surprising that he was not brought in from the wing”. He moved back to second five against City in round 7 in a 21-0 win and “strengthened the attack”. His combination with Peter Mahima and Walter Brimble “was a feature of the game”. At this point in the season the Herald included Chase in a list of Auckland club players who were in form as the trials approached. And in a suggested thirteen he was named as centre. He was “prominent at five eighths” along with Walter Brimble.

==== Auckland Māori ====
Chase was then selected by Ernie Asher in the Auckland Māori team to play South Auckland on May 28 at Davies Park in Huntly. The Auckland Māori side, also named Tāmaki lost 19-8 though there were no match reports so no scoring details or game description was reported. Chase scored another try for Manukau in a 26-11 win against Marist on June 3. He “got through a lot of useful work” on the wing.

Chase was then selected again for Auckland Māori to play Auckland Pākehā on June 5. In comments on some of the players selected the Herald wrote “one of the most discussed players in Auckland today is T. Chase, who has not played a bad game this season and he has played in many positions. His selection at five eighths will be welcomed, for Chase has talent in this position above the average. It will be interesting to watch his form against [Arthur] Kay, and [Bob] Banham”. Auckland Māori won the match 19 to 15. In comments on the play it was said “the question which was the best wing three quarter was answered by T. Chase, Manukau player, who out-starred the others, even though [Roy] Nurse and [Arthur] McInnarney showed flashes of brilliance”. The Herald wrote “a feature of the game was the brilliant play on the wing of T. Chase, who was well supported by [Jack] Hemi, at centre”. With the score 2-2 “Chase made a nice run and passed to [Jack] Brodrick, who scored between the posts”. Later he made another “dashing run”. A piece titled “An Outstanding Back – T. Chase’s Deceptive Running” appeared in the Herald which started “The outstanding back was T. Chase, whose form on the wing must have impressed the selectors. He evaded tackles cleverly and ran straight and determinedly once the goal line was in site. His tackling was excellent. As Chase can play well at fullback and even better at five eighths, he must be considered one of the certainties”. This was of course in reference to New Zealand selection for their tour.

For Manukau in a 10-6 win over Ponsonby he kicked a conversion and a penalty. He played second five eight and he and Ted Brimble gave Panapa good support. He was Manukau’s “best back on the ground and paved the way for both” of their tries.

Just one day later on June 11 he played for Auckland Māori against South Auckland at Huntly but there was no score reported and no details available about the match. Then on June 17 Manukau had a bye in the championship and Huntly District visited them to play at their Waikaraka Park ground in Onehunga. Before a large crowd Manukau won 9-8 with Chase playing in the wing. He was “the outstanding back on the ground” and scored two of their three tries. In a 24-16 victory against Papakura in round 12 once more played at Waikaraka Park Chase “did a lot of good work” on the wing along with Joe Broughton on the other.

==== New Zealand trials ====
Following a 19-5 loss to North Shore Chase was selected in New Zealand Probables side to play the Possibles in a trial match at Carlaw Park. The game was a curtain raiser to the North Island v South Island game on July 8. The selectors of the North Island side were Scotty McClymont (Auckland), Hec Brisbane (Auckland), and Gordon Hooker (Taranaki). While the New Zealand selectors were McClymont, Jack Redwood (Auckland), and Jim Amos (Canterbury). The Herald suggested “many enthusiasts … would have preferred T. Chase [to Roy Nurse and Laurie Mills who were picked in the North Island side ahead of him]”. “Chase has been the most consistent back in Auckland this season and excels on defence. He can play well in any position. Chase will get his chance however in the curtain-raiser, and has only to maintain his form to have an outstanding chance of selection in the New Zealand team”.

Chase’s Probables side win 31-17 and he converted four of their seven tries. In the first half he was involved with T. Shaw of the Waikato, who was playing fullback, in a “brilliant movement” which ended in Bert Leatherbarrow scoring. In the second half he made a good tackle on Arthur McInnarney. Chase was said to have been ”the pick of the winners backs, his defence being very solid”.

Then three days later on July 11 Chase played in another trial match for New Zealand Probables against the Possibles. He was selected on the wing once more in what was the final trial match. Probables won 27-18 with Chase scoring two tries and kicking a penalty and a conversion. He was “the outstanding wing three-quarter”. In the second half W Bellamy (Canterbury) made ground and passed to J Clark (Canterbury) before Chase scored. Then later he got the better of tacklers twice and Clarrie Peterson (Auckland) gained ground before passing to Chase for a try.

==== New Zealand selection for England tour ====
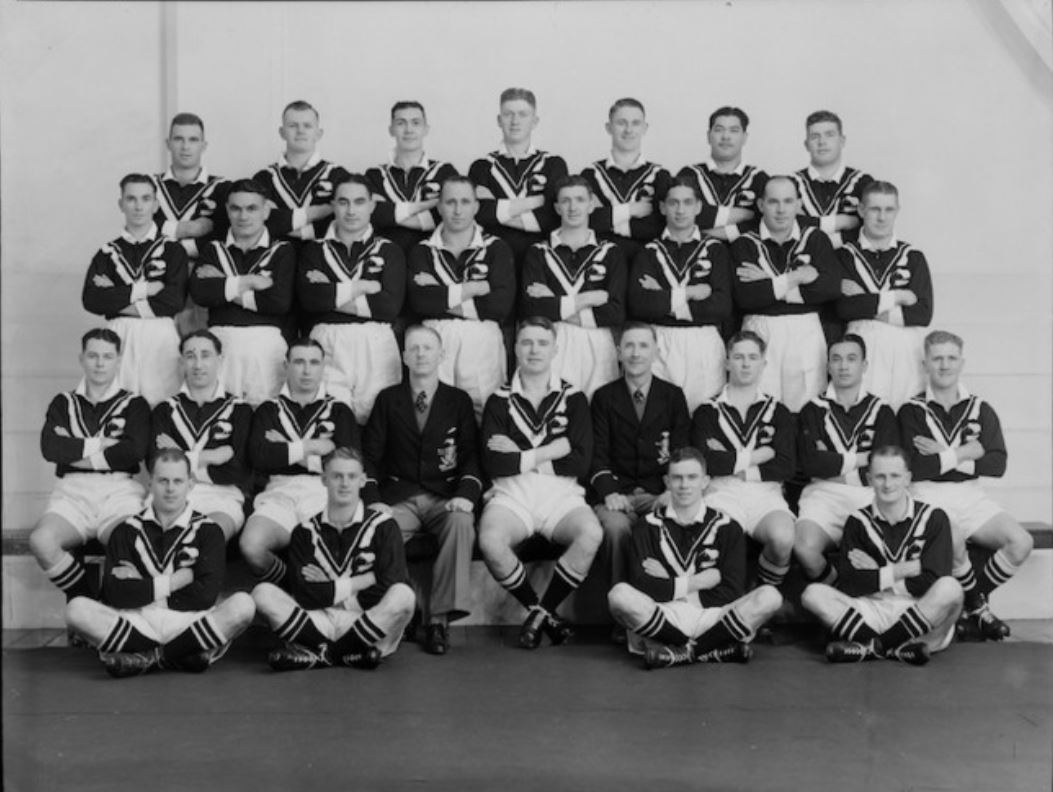
The 1939-40 touring side. Chase is seated second from the right.

Following the final trial Tommy Chase’s was named in the New Zealand side to tour England for the 1939-40 tour. The side included 26 players and he was named as one of four centre three quarters along with Arthur Kay, Wally Tittleton, and Verdun Scott. It was said that “keen followers of the game in Auckland will agree with the selection of T. Chase as one of the wings. Chase actually played his way into the team on Tuesday”.

He still had two more games for Manukau prior to their departure for England. On July 15 they lost to Mount Albert 21-19 and he was at centre. On July 22 he scored a 23-14 win.

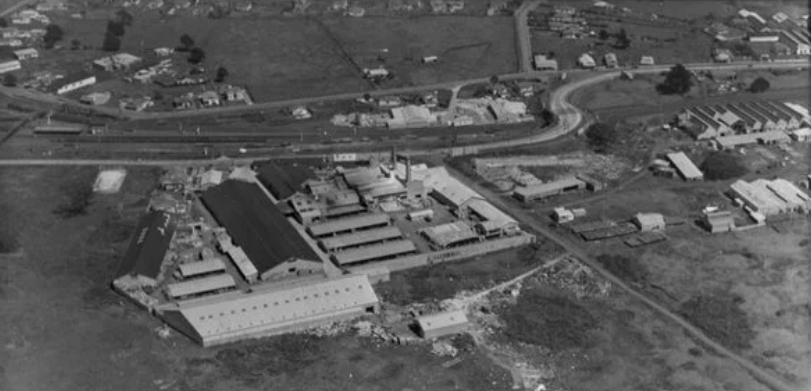
The New Zealand Glass Works in Penrose in 1938 where Chase worked.

Prior to leaving for England, Chase was a guest at a function which his employers put on for him and some of his team mates who also worked there. He was employed at the New Zealand Glass Manufacturers Company Proprietary, Limited. The farewell function was held at the Penrose in Auckland on the evening of July 20 with over 200 present. His colleagues, Pita Ririnui, Jack Hemi, and Verdun Scott were also being farewelled. They were each presented with a woollen travelling rug bearing their initials. The manager of the company, Mr. W. Kearns said that the inclusion of four employees of one company in a New Zealand side must be a record. Later in the week they left by the express for Wellington and then sailed on the Rangitiki on Friday, July 28 for London.

Unfortunately for Chase and the New Zealand side World War II broke out very shortly after they had arrived in England. They had travelled north and played a game against St Helens on September 2 and won 19 to 3 though Chase was not named in this side. War then broke out and it was decided quickly to abort the tour and for the players to return to New Zealand. However at relatively short notice the British government allowed for some entertainment venues to operate with a 10pm curfew and the game against Dewsbury was able to be played on September 9 at their Crown Flatt ground. Chase was named on the right wing. New Zealand won 22 points to 10 before a crowd of 6,200. Unsurprisingly there was relatively little of the match detail published in the newspapers in Britain. The side was said to have not been as fit as they might have as they did not anticipate having to play beyond the first game and had been touring around including a trip to Blackpool. New Zealand played up the slope in the first half and trailed 7-5 at half time. The Yorkshire Post and Leeds Intelligencer wrote that “on the wings there was resolution to go with the skill shown by both Chase, a determined little fellow, and [Jack] Smith”. And “there were occasional flashes of more than ordinary promise” from the pair.

==== Manukau and Auckland Māori 1940 ====
With the tour aborted the side returned to New Zealand in September. Chase resumed his career with Manukau and played the full season in 1940 which included 24 games, in which he scored seven tries, and kicked 23 goals. He also played three games for Auckland Māori. His first game was on April 6 for Manukau in a 16-13 win over City. He kicked two conversions in the preliminary round match. In another preliminary round match against Mount Albert he kicked a conversion and two penalties in a 15-12 loss. He was the “outstanding back” for Manukau.

The season proper opened on April 20 with Manukau beating City 11-2 though it seems that Chase didn’t play as forwards Pita Ririnui and Jack Brodrick played in the backs and Chase was not mentioned at all. He scored a try in a 30-17 loss to Marist in round 3 and was among their best backs. Manukau drew 4-4 with Richmond before 6,000 spectators at Carlaw Park. Chase, Butler, and Joe Broughton “moved freely when in possession and conceded little ground on defence”.

Following a win over Ponsonby on May 18 Chase was selected in the Auckland Māori side to play South Auckland (Waikato). The South Auckland side won 22-20 at Davies Park in Huntly with Ernie Asher selecting and coaching the Auckland Māori side once more. After halftime Chase replaced Broughton at halfback with the later moving into the five eighths. And “thereafter the Auckland side functioned better and reduced the deficit” from 14-0 which it was at the break. Chase was then named in the same side to play Auckland Pākehā at Carlaw Park on June 8. The sides were playing for the James Carlaw Memorial Trophy for the first time with the Pākehā side winning 10-7. Chase kicked a penalty in the loss and “did a lot of effective work on the wing”. During the game halfback Wilfred Brimble “started a movement in which Solomon and Chase showed excellent initiative”. Pita Ririnui who had come up to support the pair crossed for a try only to be called back for a forward pass.

Chase kicked four conversions and a penalty in a 25-16 win for Manukau over Papakura at Manukau’s home ground of Waikaraka Park in Onehunga. Papakura had led at halftime but Chase and Jack Brodrick “turned the game in favour of Manukau”. Chase then played well in their 14-8 win against Newton in round 8. He, W Butler, and W Te Tai “all did their part impressively when called on”. The Auckland Star wrote a short piece on Chase titled ‘Chase Elusive’ and said “one of the most colourful of the Manukau players on Saturday was T. Chase, the former Wanganui representative rugby player, who is now having his third league season in Auckland [it was in fact his fourth as he joined mid 1937]. Chase has a lightning side-step from the left, which often baffles opponents, and is adept at cutting a way through to make an opening for his supports”. He kicked a conversion and penalty in a 12-7 loss to North Shore on June 29. Chase, Hemi, and Butler “battled gamely against as adamant defence, but their prospects were not improved by occasional faulty handling”. He played centre the following week in an 18-12 win over City. Chase scored a try and kicked three conversions before a crowd of 7,500 and was “dominant on attack”. The next week he kicked a penalty in a 19-5 to Mount Albert. It was said that he “was not in his best kicking form, otherwise the margin between the teams would have been less”. At centre he was however “responsible for fine saving work in the Manukau back line” along with fullback Ralph Martin. Chase “several times breaking through the Mount Albert defence with elusive running”. Chase kicked two more goals in a 20-10 loss to Marist in round 12 and was among “the most convincing of the Manukau backs”.

On July 21 Manukau organised a game with South Auckland at Davies Park in Huntly. It was not an entirely Manukau side with Briggs of Ponsonby replacing Jack Brodrick during the game. Manukau XIII won 19-12 but little was reported of the match including if Chase played or not. Manukau then had a round 13 loss to Richmond 22-6 with Chase kicking two penalties. Ralph Martin and Chase “carried the burden for Manukau in the back division, although even the latter was inclined to become a trifle lackadaisical toward the finish”. In a 22-17 loss to Ponsonby he scored a try and kicked two conversions and two penalties for 11 personal points. Chase “once again… played an outstanding game and was the pivot of the attack”.

When Manukau had a bye on August 10 they played a match against the Huntly club from the Waikato at Waikaraka Park in Onehunga. The visitors won 23-13 with Chase scoring one of Manukau’s three tries. He and Jack Hemi “being the particular shining lights” for Manukau. The Auckland Star said “Chase played an excellent game… and his try was a really brilliant effort”. He scored another try in a 13-3 win over Newton in round 16 of the championship and he was “in excellent form at centre, and made many fine openings for the wings”. Manukau’s final game of the championship came in round 17 and saw them win 13 to 7. This saw them finish 4th of 9. Jack Hemi and Chase were “gifted supports” for halfback Peter Mahima.

Chase was named on the wing for Auckland Māori in their August 31 match against Auckland Pākehā opposite Roy Nurse. The Māori side was well beaten 27-6. Chase and Butler “lacked opportunities” on the wings. In a newspaper piece titled ‘Chase Shows Dash’ it was said that “great dash was shown by T. Chase at wing three-quarter for the Maori team … and his skill at side stepping and elusive running made him very popular with the crowd. He was one of the outstanding backs of the Maori team which went to Australia in 1935, and since joining up with the league game in Auckland he has been one of the most prominent players. Chase is a fine utility back. He is a good five eighth and a place kick well above the average. However, wing three quarter gives him most scope for his ability, his defence is good, and he has decided scoring ability”.

Manukau had a bye in round 1 of the Roope Rooster knockout competition and then played Papakura in round 2. They suffered a surprise defeat 25-21 with Chase scoring one of the losers five tries. He was “the best back on the ground” for Manukau. Manukau then dropped into the consolation Phelan Shield competition and drew with Marist 10-10 before beating them 23-9 in the replay on September 28. They beat City 27-16 in the semi final and then on October 12 beat Mount Albert 20-14 in the final though Chase did not play in this match.

Manukau’s final game of the season was against a Tauranga Māori rugby union side at the Tauranga Domain on October 19. They in fact played rugby union rather than rugby league. The Manukau club had the choice of playing a game in Rotorua or Tauranga and the players chose the later. Chase was named to play on the wing but ultimately played outside centre. While Manukau was a rugby league club a large number of their players had started their careers as rugby players including many who had been representative rugby players such as Jack Hemi, Tommy Chase himself, Pita Ririnui, Jack Brodrick, and Hawea Mataira amongst others. The Manukau side won 18-13 with Chase being very “prominent” and at one point Hemi sent him away “in a fast solo run during which he evaded most of the Tauranga defence”.

==== Manukau (1941) ====
Chase turned out for Manukau for the entire season again in 1941, playing 22 games. He scored five tries but only kicked seven goals. He also played two games for Auckland Māori. In notes before the season on which players would be turning out it was said “the backs will include Tommy Chase, still one of the brightest players seen for some years”. In a preliminary game on April 19, he kicked two conversions and a penalty in a 34-19 loss to Richmond. He was described as the “leader” of the backs; “a splendid move by him led to Manukau’s only try in the first spell”. At centre he was “always a danger” to Richmond, and reportedly “did a lot of clever work”. In the second half he “again featured in a brilliant opening which gave Murray a try behind the posts”. Towards the end of the match he went off the field with an injured knee. The Herald said he was “versatile as ever [and] was the outstanding figure in the back line”. In a 38-10 win over Newton in their next preliminary game he kicked three conversions. Chase and J Martin “showed perfect understanding, and were always dangerous”. In their first Fox Memorial championship game they lost 17-4 to North Shore. Chase was at fullback with Jack Hemi still out of Auckland and he kicked one penalty. He scored a try in a 10-7 loss to Ponsonby in round 2. At second five eighth his “deceptive side step made him hard to stop”. His try came after he fielded a kicked ball on the bounce to cross the line and was said to have been “well conceived and brilliantly executed”. They had their first win over Marist 34-3 with Chase and Joe Murray showing “excellent combination”.

==== Auckland Māori ====
Chase was chosen on the wing in the Auckland Māori team to play South Auckland (Waikato) on June 2 at Carlaw Park. When the team took the field though Chase was playing halfback as they did not have a regular one in their squad. They lost 23 to 12 before a large crowd. Although Chase was out of position at halfback he made few mistakes.

Manukau then beat City 11-5 in round 5. Chase, Broughton, and Martin were the “cleverest” of the Manukau backs. Manukau then easily beat Papakura 43-8 with Chase scoring one of their nine tries. Chase played at fullback in a 16-5 win over Newton the following week with Jack Hemi moving to second five eighth. Chase “figured prominently on defence”. He was at fullback again in their 14-5 win against Mount Albert in round 8. He was said to have given “great service” there “with cool and resourceful positional play”. A short piece titled “Chase Spectacular” appeared in the Auckland Star which said “a colourful game was played by T. Chase at fullback for Manukau against Mount Albert. In defence he was very sound, and late in the game he took a turn in attack. Chase made practically all the running for a try which Ririnui got. Starting from his own twenty five Chase, with free use of his characteristic side step weaved his way right through to McLaughlin, the Mount Albert fullback. By that time Ririnui was at his side and ready for the pass which meant a try”. The Herald said “fine anticipation, clean handling and an eagerness to chime in with his backs whenever the opportunity presented made Chase, fullback, a powerful force in the Manukau rearguard”. Perhaps surprisingly Chase was left out of the Auckland representative side for their game with South Auckland with Hemi named at fullback and Butler, and Brian Riley on the wings. He was “extremely sound” at fullback for Manukau in a 9-7 loss to Richmond the following weekend. The Auckland Star said he showed “good form” and “sure handed he was never at fault in fielding the ball and his kicking was well directed. Twice in the late stages of the match Chase tried to land a field goal and both efforts were exceptionally good. Chase is a versatile player but possibly would be better positioned at left wing three quarter where his rapid side step and attacking skill could be used to best advantage”. The Herald had a somewhat contrary opinion of his play saying that “it was unusual to see Chase showing faulty judgement at fullback … his handling and positional play both revealing weaknesses. But for smart covering by Murray, Hemi, and Martin, some of his mistakes would have proved costly”.

Chase was again at fullback in their 22-7 win over North Shore before being moved to the wing for their 18-5 win against Ponsonby in round 11 and helped set up a try to Butler.

In a 45-3 win over Marist Chase scored two tries and “blended well” on the wings with Butler. He was “good on the wing and his tries were spectacular”. He played at halfback in a 7-2 win against City on August 9. He “did reasonably well in a position which did not suit him. His best effort came later in the game when he forgot that he was a half back and went off with a side stepping run which breached the City defence, and, as support came on led to a Manukau try” for Joe Murray. He “played an excellent” according to the Herald.

On August 16 Manukau had a bye and travelled out to Te Kohanga which was a small settlement near Tuakau just south of Auckland to play the local rugby side in a rugby union game. The match was to assist Te Puea Hērangi in raising money for the Māori Red Cross. They played under the name of ‘Tamaki Rugby’. They raised £56 and won 37 to 6. Chase was unavailable for their next game with Richmond but turned out for the round 16 game with Papakura which they won 43-2. He showed “clever and elusive running” and “made many spectacular runs”. They beat Newton and then in the final round needed to beat Mount Albert and hope that North Shore lost to Newton to win the championship. Manukau defeated Mount Albert 33-18 but North Shore won so Manukau finished one point behind them in the championship. Chase scored a try and also set up W. Te Tai for his try. At second five eighth he took a pass from Hemi and ran 50 yards to score. He and Hemi “pivoted the attack”.

==== Auckland Māori ====
Chase was selected in the Auckland Māori side to play the annual match with Auckland Pākehā on September 20. Chase had to play halfback once again and they won 21-17 with a last minute converted try before 6,000 spectators. The Star wrote that “the sharp way he sent the ball out gave the Maori backs plenty of opportunities for action. This season Chase has played in every back position, although his best place is possibly at left wing three quarter, where he is able in attack to exploit a side stepping run off the left foot”. He “threw out good passes” and was involved in two of Gregory’s tries. He “gave excellent service behind the scrum” and the first try he set up for Gregory saw him make an opening with Puti Tipene Watene, and George Mitchell.

Manukau had a huge 52-2 win against Newton in the Roope Rooster second round. His “positional play and speed” along with the other backs “was a feature of the game”, and “Chase paved the way for several tries”. They then beat City in the semi final 20-11 with Chase playing with “freedom” on the wing.

Manukau was up against Ponsonby in the final of the Roope Rooster competition and had a 28-10 win with Chase playing “splendidly” on the wing. It was the second time they had won the trophy. Their final game of the season was against North Shore in the Stormont Shield final for the ‘champion of champions’. Manukau won easily 30-10 before a crowd of 12,000 at Carlaw Park. Chase and Butler were the wings and were “both prominent on attack”.

==== Manukau, Auckland Māori, Auckland, and Māori XIII ====
The 1942 season saw Chase captain the Manukau side. He had easily his highest point scoring year of his rugby league career with 122 from two tries, 39 conversions, and 18 penalties. This saw him as the leading point scorer in the senior rugby league competitions in Auckland. It was to be his final full season of rugby league, only playing sporadically in the following seasons. He also played twice for Auckland Māori, and once for Auckland, with another game for a Māori XIII.

To start the season Manukau played Richmond in a preliminary round game on May 2. Manukau won 25 to 8 with Chase and Joe Murray said to have “showed speed and made many openings for their support players”. There was no scoring for the match but later in the season it was reported that he had scored 102 points to that point with only 92 reported in other matches it is likely he kicked five goals. Their fist Fox Memorial championship game was on May 9 against an amalgamated City Rovers-Otahuhu United side. The Auckland Rugby League had forced their senior sides to join, along with Newton Rangers and Mount Albert, and Marist Old Boys and North Shore Albions in order to improve the standard of the senior competition. However the forced amalgamations proved very unpopular with several clubs and only lasted a season. Manukau lost 10-7 with Chase kicking two penalties.

Manukau then beat Marist-North Shore 33-5 though North Shore had refused to contribute any players to the side at this point so it was effectively just Marist. Chase “was sound at fullback and kicked some great goals” with five conversions and one penalty. Manukau beat Richmond in round 3 13 to 6 with Chase kicking a conversion and a penalty. Chase played in the five eighths with Joe Murray after Ivan Gregory rejoined the side at centre. The five eighth pair turned “defence into attack” which “was an important factor in the team’s success”, and they played “clever football” along with Gregory. Manukau then beat Newton-Mount Albert 10-5 with Chase kicking two penalties.

In a 21-3 win against Ponsonby on June 6, he scored a try and kicked three conversions.

Manukau had another win, 20-12 over City-Otahuhu in round 6. Chase continued his goal kicking form with three conversions and one penalty with one of his conversion a “remarkable effort” coming “from the edge of the sideline”. Their sixth consecutive win came against Marist-North Shore which was now at full strength by 37 to 9. He kicked five goals and with them going over “from wide angles”. Chase converted one of their three tries in a 11-10 win against Richmond on June 27. The following week he converted three tries and kicked a penalty in a 23-12 win against Newton-Mount Albert with Murray at five eighth and Watene at centre. Chase and Murray “were associated in all the open play”.

==== Captain of Auckland v South Auckland (Waikato) ====
In early July, Chase was selected for Auckland for their match with South Auckland (Waikato) to be played on July 11. He was named in the five eighths with Manukau team mate Joe Murray. Chase was named to captain the representative side for the first time. Along with him and Murray the backs also featured team mates Ralph Martin at fullback and W Butler on the wing. Ron McGregor was on debut aged just 18. Auckland won the game convincingly 49 to 16 with Chase scoring a try and converting eight of their 11 tries for 19 personal points. The Herald wrote that a feature of the game was his scoring. The Auckland Star said his “goal-kicking was remarkably accurate, and several of the conversions were from difficult angles. In attacking play, Chase paired well with J. Murray, and gave the Auckland play a very sharp thrust”.

Returning to Manukau the following weekend he kicked three penalties but they lost 11-6 to Ponsonby, their first defeat in over two months. His and Arthur Kay’s goal kicking was “splendid” in poor conditions with heavy rain and a greasy ball. In round 11 Manukau returned to winning ways with a 15-5 win against Marist-North Shore with Chase kicking another three goals, conversions of all of their tries. He kicked another 5 goals when Manukau defeated City-Otahuhu 13-9 on August 1. With the point she brought up 102 in total for the season to this point. The Herald wrote “great goal-kicking by Chase actually decided the issue”, and that he “played a fine game for the winners”.

Manukau then won the championship in round 13 with several rounds still to go when they beat Richmond 19-3. Chase only managed to convert one of their five tries. It was their second ever Fox Memorial championship win following their first in 1936 and the first for Chase after he joined the club in 1937. In the penultimate round his remarkable goal kicking continued when Manukau beat Newton-Mount Albert 27-8 with five conversions from five attempts and a penalty. Chase then kicked four more conversions in their final championship game in a 28-2 win over Ponsonby which meant they finished six points clear of City-Otahuhu on 26 points to their 20.

==== Auckland Māori v Auckland Pākehā ====
Following Manukau’s final championship game Chase was named to play for Auckland Māori against Auckland Pākehā. Auckland Māori won the game 10-8 which was played on August 29 at Carlaw Park. Chase played on the wing against young William Kinney with Chase described as an “experienced and reliable marker” for him. During the game Chase took the ball on the wing and then in-passed to Tom Butler who had an open field to run in a try. Overall he “played well on the wing”.

Manukau were then surprisingly defeated by Marist-North Shore in the first round of the Roope Rooster knockout competition. Chase kicked their only points with a penalty on September 5. With no game the following weekend the Manukau team received permission to travel to Wellington to play the Wellington representative side. The Evening Post newspaper in Wellington named Chase as the captain of the Manukau side. In an advertisement for the game in the Dominion newspaper it said “hear and see Manukau perform the hakas that have delighted the northern crowds. The brilliantly unorthodox rugger of a great Maori team, including Jack Hemi, Tommy Chase, Steve Watene, Pita Ririnui, and other representatives”. Manukau won the game 23-17 at the Basin Reserve on September 12 with Jack Hemi taking the kicking duty for one of the only times in the season. Chase played at fullback before a crowd described as the largest for a league match in Wellington for many years. He “gained much ground for Manukau with his boot” during the match, though he had to leave “the field with an injured hand just before the end of the game”.

Chase’s next game was for the Stormont Memorial Shield with Manukau (championship winners) up against Richmond (Roope Rooster winners) on September 26. Manukau won the trophy for the second consecutive year after winning it for the first time in 1941. Their win was by 11 points to 5 with Chase scoring one of their three tries. His try came after he “figured in a movement” twice as did Aubrey Thompson and Joe Murray with Chase racing over. He was said to have “played well on the wing”.

Chase was selected in the Auckland Māori side for their final game of the season against Auckland Pākehā on October 5. With final arrangements for the game being made at the Auckland Rugby League control board meeting on September 30, Chase (captain of Manukau) spoke at the meeting along with G Grey Campbell, and H de Wolfe. Chase was speaking on behalf of the Manukau club who had won the championship and Stormont Shield. The representative match was drawn 23-23 at Carlaw Park. Chase was said to have been “solid on defence”.

His final game of the season came on October 17 in an unofficial game between a Māori XIII and an All Golds side which was made up of many representative and other prominent players. The match was organised by the N.Z. Rugby League Old Boys Association Social Club which was an organisation put together by the players and was not sanctioned by the New Zealand Rugby League. As the game was not officially sanctioned, the game was played on the Auckland Council owned Western Springs ground. The Māori side included players such as Ralph Martin, Chase, Tom Butler, Hawea Mataira, Joe Murray, Jack Hemi, Pita Ririnui, Puti Tipene Watene, Jack Tristram, Aubrey Thompson, and Bill Turei. While the opposition included well known players Bob Scott, Ivan Gregory, Wally Tittleton, Brian Riley, Clarrie Peterson, and George Mitchell. The All Golds side was essentially the M.T.P. (Military Transport Pool) side which had won the Gallaher Shield (Auckland club rugby championship), and which had been made up largely of representative rugby league players who had enlisted and had to play rugby union as there were no military rugby league sides. The match saw the strong All Golds side beat the Māori XIII by 18 points to 9.

==== Injuries and Retirement (1943-45) ====
With Chase now aged 30-31 he began a ‘slow retirement’ forced by some bad injuries. He played two games for Manukau in 1943, four in 1944, and four in 1945. He was largely only playing when the side needed him too. Chase still managed to add 62 points to his career tally for Manukau across those ten games. His first game was in Manukau's season opener against Otahuhu on April 17 in a preliminary match. Manukau won 26-23 with Chase converting three tries and adding a penalty. Chase missed their next game against North Shore with several new players being fielded including two new wingers. While it was not stated at the time it was revealed later that he had been injured and had a long absence of over three months. His first game back from injury was on the wing on July 24 in round 13 with Manukau winning 11-5. Chase did not play in any of their remaining games with it not stated why. He may have not been fully fit, or perhaps was not needed as Manukau won the championship for the second consecutive season.

In 1944 Chase played four games, with three to start the season, and one near the end after having suffered a broken leg. His first game was against Newton in a preliminary round game with Manukau winning easily 31-11, helped by Chase kicking five conversions and a penalty. In the second round of preliminary games he kicked two conversions in a 10-22 loss. Chase then kicked a conversion and a penalty in their Fox Memorial opening round loss to North Shore, 18-7. He then didn’t play again until September 30 when they lost to North Shore 18-8 in the second round of the Roope Rooster knockout competition. He was in the centre position.

In 1945 he played four early matches before retiring once and for all. His first match was round one of the Fox Memorial championship on April 14. Manukau beat North Shore 35-9, Chase kicking three conversions while playing fullback. Before the game it was speculated as to who would be at fullback, whether Tommy Chase or Ralph Martin. It was said that “the Manukau backs, including Murray, Butler, and Chase, were generally superior to their opponents”. He was at fullback again in a 31-5 win against Newton in round 2, essentially filling in for Ralph Martin before he could return to play. Chase converted five of their seven tries. Early in the match “from his own twenty-five Chase beat the attackers and passed to Murray, who carried play well into the danger zone”. Then from a scrum Te Tai eventually scored. In round 3 Chase played at halfback in place of Major against Mount Albert. Manukau lost 17-15, Chase kicking three goals for the losers. In the first half “Chase started a passing bout, and the New Zealand Māori representative sent it on to Ririnui, who forced a gap in the defence, and Rogers raced over for a brilliant try”. Soon after he “kicked a great penalty goal from 40yrds out”.

On the day of the game the Auckland Star wrote a short piece on Chase which was titled ‘Tommy Chase Turns Out Again For Manukau League’ and said “In the absence of Ralph Martin as the Manukau fullback, Tommy Chase has stepped into the gap to reveal a remarkably retention of his high-class form of ten years ago. Chase first came to prominence as a rugby union player in the Wanganui district when, at 17 years of age, he was a member of the New Zealand Māori team which visited Australia in 1935. Chase then hailed from Taihape, the home town of the famous “Moke” Bellis. Chase came to Auckland in 1937 and played for Manukau and in a short time he established a fine record as a full-back, five eighths, and a very reliable goal kicker. As a custodian, he was noted for soundness, rather than anything spectacular. In later years Tommy had had more than his share of injuries. A broken leg a year ago wrote what was thought to be his ‘finis’ to his football days. He was a member of the New Zealand Rugby League team which visited England in 1939, when the war called an abrupt halt to what appeared a successful venture. Chase was missing from the playing fields last season but in the two games already played he has kicked ten goals, and has bright prospects of taking the goal-kicking honours for the season”. After the match he had added another three to his tally.

Chase had one more magnificent match to most likely finish his career with. In round 4 he played in the five eighths with Major back at halfback and converted all three tries and kicked three penalties in a 21-13 win against City in the main match at Carlaw Park on May 5. The Star wrote that he had a “field day” with his kicking. The title for the match report in the Herald was ‘Grand Kicking By Tommy Chase Brings 12 Points’. His first attempt was “a beautiful angle goal”. The Star wrote “once again the veteran Tommy Chase ably filled the position of halfback in place of the usual scrum half, Major. His unorthodox methods made gaps in the defence”. In a different article they wrote “Tommy Chase, showed remarkable accuracy and landed six goals, several being from difficult angles, the best effort of it’s[sic] kind since Jack Hemi was with the team”. The Herald contradicted the Star by saying that “Major played a fine game at halfback, and Chase, moved from fullback to five eighths, did useful work”. There was no mention of Chase in any of Manukau’s matches over the remainder of the season.

== Personal life ==
Tommy Chase died in 1956 aged 44.
