= George Bullock-Douglas =

New Zealand rugby union player (1911–1958)

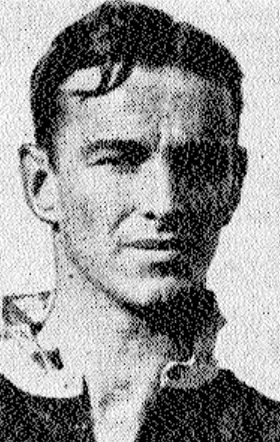
- Born: George Arthur Hardy Bullock-Douglas; 4 June 1911 Whanganui, New Zealand
- Died: 25 June 1958 (aged 47) Whanganui, New Zealand
- Height: 1.75 m (5 ft 9 in)
- Weight: 72 kg (159 lb)
- School: Auckland Grammar School; Whanganui Collegiate School
- Occupation(s): Bank officer, accountant

Rugby union career
- Position: Wing
Provincial / State sides
Years	Team	Apps	(Points)
1931–36	Wanganui	28	
International career
Years	Team	Apps	(Points)
1932–34	New Zealand	5	(9)

George Arthur Hardy Bullock-Douglas (4 June 1911 – 25 June 1958) was a New Zealand rugby union player. A wing three-quarter, Bullock-Douglas represented Whanganui at a provincial level, and was a member of the New Zealand national side, the All Blacks, from 1932 to 1934. He played 15 matches for the All Blacks including five internationals.

Bullock-Douglas was educated first at Gonville School. He then had a stint at Auckland Grammar School and lastly, Whanganui Collegiate School where he was a member of the 1st XV in his two years at the school between 1927 and 1928. He was also a member of the school's 1st XI cricket team. He later played representative cricket for Whanganui, and appeared in a match for Whanganui against the MCC on their 1935–36 tour of New Zealand. In that match, Bullock-Douglas batted at number 7 or 8, and scored 14 and 0 respectively in his two innings.

A bank officer, Bullock-Douglas was awarded a Diploma in Banking by Victoria University College in 1934. During World War II he served as an officer with the 21st Battalion of the New Zealand Military Forces, reaching the rank of captain. He saw active service in Greece and North Africa, and was twice wounded: in Greece in 1941, and Libya in 1943.

Bullock-Douglas married Amy Trundle in Auckland in March 1940. After the war, he resumed his banking career before joining a firm of accountants in Hāwera. He died in June 1958 after a long illness, aged 47.
