= 1974–75 Rugby Union County Championship =

English rugby union competition

1974–75 County Championship
- Countries: England
- Champions: Gloucestershire (12th title)
- Runners-up: Eastern Counties

The 1974–75 Rugby Union County Championship was the 75th edition of England's County Championship rugby union club competition.

Gloucestershire won their 12th title after defeating Eastern Counties in the final.

== First Round ==
Pos	Northern Group	P	W	D	L	F	A	Pts
1	Lancashire	5	5	0	0	77	36	10
2	Yorkshire	5	4	0	1	93	39	8
3	Cheshire	5	3	0	2	88	62	6
4	Northumberland	5	2	0	3	65	71	4
5	Durham	5	1	0	4	37	99	2
6	Cumberland & Westmorland	5	0	0	5	43	96	0

Pos	Midland Group	P	W	D	L	F	A	Pts
1	Warwickshire	5	5	0	0	177	29	10
2	Notts, Lincs & Derby	5	4	0	1	112	100	8
3	North Midlands	5	3	0	2	69	71	6
4	East Midlands	5	1	0	4	49	93	2
5	Staffordshire	5	1	0	4	51	99	2
6	Leicestershire	5	1	0	4	49	115	2

Pos	South East Group	P	W	D	L	F	A	Pts
1	Eastern Counties +	5	4	0	1	88	47	8
2	Middlesex	5	4	0	1	120	60	8
3	Surrey	5	4	0	1	90	52	8
4	Kent	5	1	1	3	73	90	3
5	Hampshire	5	1	1	3	63	83	3
6	Sussex	5	0	0	5	21	123	0

+Eastern Counties won three way play off

Pos	South-West Group	P	W	D	L	F	A	Pts
1	Gloucestershire	3	3	0	0	46	15	6
2	Somerset	3	2	0	1	15	20	4
3	Cornwall	3	1	0	2	27	29	2
4	Devon	3	0	0	3	21	45	0

Pos	Southern Group	P	W	D	L	F	A	Pts
1	Hertfordshire	4	3	0	1	83	61	6
2	Berkshire	4	2	1	1	64	49	5
3	Buckinghamshire	4	2	1	1	71	66	5
4	Oxfordshire	4	2	0	2	56	57	4
5	Dorset & Wilts	4	0	0	4	40	81	0

== Second Round ==
Team One	Team Two	Score
Gloucestershire	Hertfordshire	15-12

== Semi finals ==
Date	Venue	Team One	Team Two	Score
22 Feb	Blundellsands	Lancashire	Eastern Counties	9-19
22 Feb	Kingsholm	Gloucestershire	Warwickshire	28-3

== Final ==
22 March 1975

Gloucestershire	13–9	Eastern Counties
Try: Brinn, Dix; Con: Butler; Pen: Butler		Try: Callum; Con: Wyatt; Pen: Jorden

Kingsholm Stadium, Gloucester
Referee: Alan Welsby (Lancashire)

15	Peter Butler	Gloucester
14	Alan Morley	Bristol
13	John Bayliss (capt)	Gloucester
12	Richard Jardine	Gloucester
11	Stuart Dix	Gloucester
10	Dave Pointon	St Paul's College
9	Peter Kingston	Gloucester
8	Dave Rollitt	Bristol
7	John Haines	Gloucester
6	John Watkins	Gloucester
5	John Fidler	Gloucester
4	Alan Brinn	Gloucester
3	Mike Burton	Gloucester
2	David Protherough	Moseley
1	Barry Nelmes	Cardiff
Replacements:
	D T Crabbe	Gloucester
	Colin Patterson	Bristol University
	M J Nicholls	Gloucester
	N A Jackson	Gloucester
	E A Pinkney	Gloucester

15	Tony Jorden (capt)	Bedford
14	David McKay	Rosslyn Park
13	Jeremy Janion	Richmond
12	I Vinter	Saracens
11	Derek Wyatt	Bedford
10	Les Byrne	Blackheath
9	Jacko Page	Northampton
8	A Hollins	Bedford
7	Steve Callum	Upper Clapton
6	Tony Bucknall	Richmond
5	Nick Martin	Harlequins
4	Tony Rodgers	Rosslyn Park
3	K Cairns	Saracens
2	Phil Keith-Roach	Rosslyn Park
1	Chris Bailward	Bedford
Replacements:
	D J Ling	Ipswich
	T O'Hanlon	Richmond
	J Stokoe	Blackheath
	G Swainson	Blackheath
	P Holden	Saracens
	B Carter	Moseley

== See also ==
- English rugby union system
- Rugby union in England
