= 1975 England rugby union tour of Australia =

Summary
P	W	D	L
Total
8	4	0	4
Test match
2	0	0	2
Opponent
P	W	D	L
Australia
2	0	0	2

The 1975 England rugby union tour of Australia was a series of eight matches played by the England national rugby union team in Australia in May and June 1975. England won only four of the eight matches and lost both internationals to Australia. In addition to the two test defeats they also lost to the Sydney and New South Wales Country representative teams.

The England selectors boldly, and in the circumstances quite rightly, chose an experimental squad for this, England's first tour of Australia. That the experiment was not altogether successful, nor the tour the team building exercise it had been intended to be, was largely due to the extraordinary number of injuries suffered by the England squad, frequently to key players.

== Matches ==
Scores and results list England's points tally first.

Opposing Team	For	Against	Date	Venue	Status
Western Australia	64	12	10 May 1975	Perry Lakes Stadium, Perth	Tour match
Sydney	10	14	13 May 1975	Sydney Sports Ground, Sydney	Tour match
New South Wales	29	24	17 May 1975	Sydney Sports Ground, Sydney	Tour match
New South Wales Country XV	13	14	20 May 1975	Workers Arena, Goulburn	Tour match
Australia	9	16	24 May 1975	Sydney Cricket Ground, Sydney	First Test
Queensland	29	3	27 May 1975	Ballymore, Brisbane	Tour match
Australia	21	30	31 May 1975	Ballymore, Brisbane	Second Test
Queensland Country	42	6	3 June 1975	Townsville Sports Reserve, Townsville	Tour match

== Touring party ==
- Manager: Alec Lewis
- Assistant Manager: John Burgess
- Captain: Tony Neary (Broughton Park) 26 caps

=== Backs ===
- Brian Ashton (Orrell) No caps
- Neil Bennett (Bedford) 1 cap
- Peter Butler (Gloucester) No caps
- Alastair Hignell (Cambridge University) No caps
- Peter Kingston (Gloucester) No caps
- Andy Maxwell (New Brighton) No caps
- Alan Morley (Bristol) 5 caps
- Peter Preece (Coventry) 10 caps
- Keith Smith (Roundhay) 4 caps
- Peter Squires (Harrogate) 12 caps
- Alan Wordsworth (Cambridge University) No caps
- Derek Wyatt (Bedford) No aps

Replacements

- Jeremy Janion (Richmond) 10 Caps
- Alan Old (Middlesbrough) 12 Caps
- Ian Orum (Roundhay) No Caps

=== Forwards ===
- Bill Beaumont (Fylde) 1 cap
- Phil Blakeway (Gloucester) No caps
- Mike Burton (Gloucester) 8 caps
- Steve Callum (Upper Clapton) No caps
- Fran Cotton (Coventry) 14 caps
- Neil Mantell (Rosslyn Park) No caps
- Tony Neary (Broughton Park) 26 caps
- John Pullin (Bristol) 39 caps
- Jon Raphael (Northampton) No caps
- Andy Ripley (Rosslyn Park) 19 caps
- Dave Rollitt (Bristol) 9 caps
- Roger Uttley (Gosforth) 11 caps
- Bob Wilkinson (Bedford) No caps

Replacements

- Peter Dixon (Gosforth) 13 caps
- Barry Nelmes (Cardiff) No caps
