= Eric Stephens =

Eric Stephens may refer to:

- Eric Stephens (cricketer) (1909–1983), English cricketer
- Eric Stephens (rugby union) (born 1939), English rugby player
- Eric John Stephens (1895–1967), Australian flying ace

== See also ==
- Eric Stevens (born 1989), American football player
