= 1977–78 Divisional Championship (rugby union) =

- Countries: England
- Champions: North (1st title)
- Runners-up: Midlands

The 1977–78 Divisional Championship was the first edition of a new event in England's rugby calendar, played in its entirety across three weeks in December 1977. During the first season of the competition, there were sub-divisional trial matches held among the four divisions prior to the semi-final stage.

In the championship's first final, held on 17 December 1977 at Twickenham, the North beat the Midlands 22-7, while earlier in the day London beat the South & South-West 22–15 in the play-off for third and fourth place.

== Results ==
=== Inter-Divisional round ===
3 Dec 1977

North-East	9–16	North-West

Headingley
Referee: B Head-Rapson (Notts, Lincs, Derby)

3 Dec 1977

Midlands West	12–6	Midlands East

Coventry
Referee: M J Fisk (Yorkshire)

3 Dec 1977

South-West	18–13	South

Exeter
Referee: O E Doyle (Ireland)

3 Dec 1977

London South	12–25	London North

Esher
Referee: M D M Rea (Ireland)

=== Semi-finals ===
10 Dec 1977

London	6–52	North

Sudbury
Referee: L Prideaux (North Midlands)

10 Dec 1977

South & South-West	3–19	Midlands

Bath
Referee: B Head-Rapson (Notts, Lincs, Derby)

=== 3rd/4th play-off ===
17 Dec 1977

London	22–15	South & South-West

Twickenham
Referee: P E Hughes (Lancashire)

=== Final ===
17 Dec 1977

North	22–7	Midlands
Tries: Caplan (2); Maxwell; Con: Caplan; Young; Pen: Young; DG: Horton		Try: Knee; Pen: Hare

Twickenham
Referee: Alan Welsby (Lancashire)

FB	15	David Caplan (Headingley)
RW	14	(England) Peter Squires (Harrogate)
OC	13	(England) Tony Bond (Broughton Park)
IC	12	Andy Maxwell (Headingley)
LW	11	John Carleton (Orrell)
FH	10	John Horton (Bath)
SH	9	(England) Malcolm Young (Gosforth)
N8	8	P Moss (Orrell)
OF	7	(England) Tony Neary (Broughton Park)
BF	6	(England) Peter Dixon (Gosforth)
RL	5	J Butler (Egremont)	(substituted off) 33'
LL	4	(England) Bill Beaumont (Fylde) (c)
TP	3	(England) Fran Cotton (Sale)	(substituted off) 70'
HK	2	K Pacey (Broughton Park)
LP	1	Colin White (Gosforth)
Replacements:
LK	--	T Roberts (Gosforth)	(substituted in) 33'
PR	--	Jeff Bell (Middlesbrough)	(substituted in) 70'
		flag denotes international
		(at time of match)

FB	15	(England) Dusty Hare (Leicester)
RW	14	P Knee (Coventry)
OC	13	(England) Barrie Corless (Moseley) (c)
IC	12	Paul Dodge (Leicester)
LW	11	Tim Barnwell (Leicester)
FH	10	(England) Martin Cooper (Moseley)
SH	9	Ian Peck (Bedford)
N8	8	Nick Jeavons (Moseley)
OF	7	D Warren (Moseley)
BF	6	J Shipsides (Coventry)
RL	5	I Darnell (Coventry)	(substituted off) 69'
LL	4	R Field (Moseley)
TP	3	W H Greaves (Moseley)
HK	2	G N Cox (Moseley)
LP	1	(England) Robin Cowling (Leicester)
Replacements:
LK	--	Derek Nutt (Moseley)	(substituted in) 69'
		flag denotes international
		(at time of match)

=== Report ===
The four Lions in the North's pack - Beaumont, Cotton, Dixon and Neary - played a large part in their side's success. Additionally Malcolm Young upheld his England status with a lively display at scrum-half and Caplan, who was later to win his first cap, showed his capabilities as an attacking full-back by scoring two tries. The best moment of the match came in the second half when Maxwell, the North centre, burst clean through past Corless from just inside halfway for a superb individual try. Altogether seven of the North team were picked for the first international (of the 1978 Five Nations), against France.

Horton, the Lancashire fly-half, opened the scoring in the ninth minute with a well-taken dropped goal for the North, to which Hare replied with a mammoth penalty goal from a metre inside his own half for the Midlands. An unconverted try by Caplan, taking an inside pass from Carleton, gave the North a lead of 7–3 at half-time. From then on they forged further ahead with a penalty goal by Young, a second try by Caplan, converted by Young, and Maxwell's splendid try, which Caplan converted from wide out. At 22-3 the match was virtually over, but the Midlands had the last word. From a short penalty, Cooper, Corless and Dodge moved the ball rapidly to Knee, who ran in for an unconverted try near the corner.
