= Cardiff Arms Park =

Sports venue in Cardiff, Wales

Cardiff Arms Park (CAP)
- Rugby ground

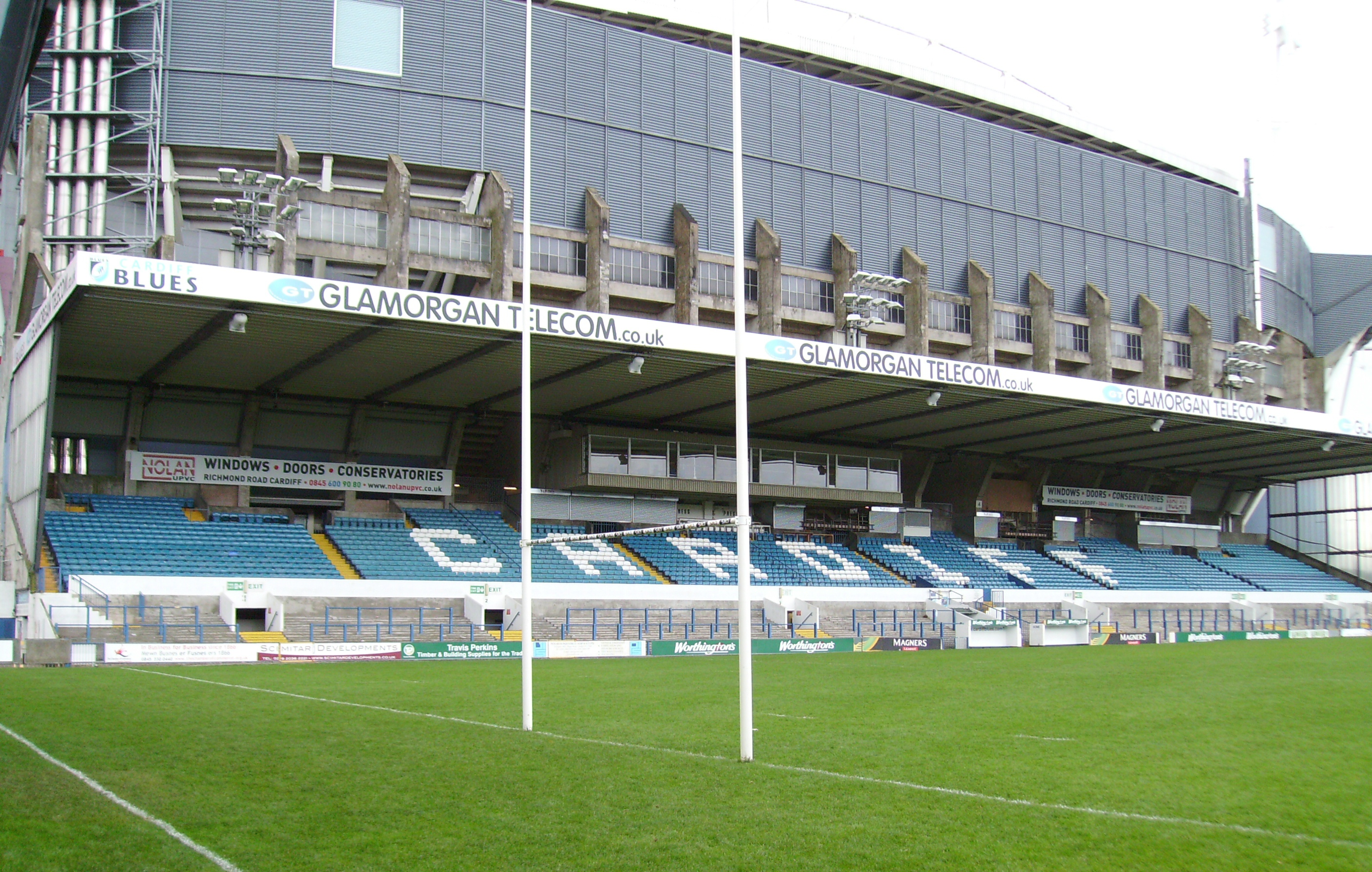
- Cardiff Arms Park in the foreground and the Millennium Stadium in the background

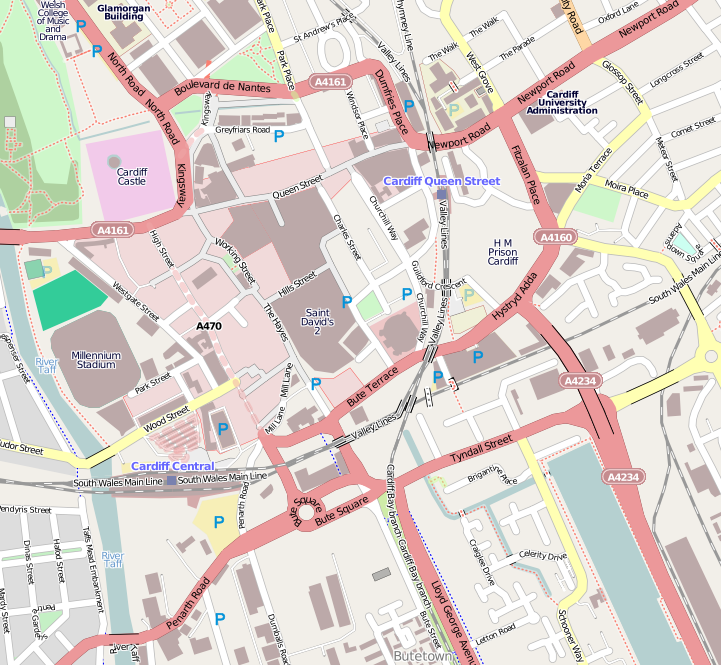
- Location of Cardiff Arms Park in Cardiff city centre
- Location: Cardiff, Wales
- Coordinates: 51°28′47″N 3°11′1″W
- Owner: Cardiff Athletic Club
- Capacity: 16,500 (1969); 12,125 (present day)
- Surface: 3G Artificial turf
- Public transit: Cardiff Central railway station and Cardiff Central bus station

Construction
- Groundbreaking: 1967
- Opened: 1969
- Architects: Osborne V. Webb and Partners
- Main contractors: G. A. Williamson and Andrew Scott and Co.

Tenants
- Cardiff Rugby (2003–2009; 2012–present); Cardiff RFC (1969–present) Major sporting events hosted 2008 IRB Junior World Championship Semi-Final; 2013–14 European Challenge Cup Final; Steve Robinson vs. Prince Naseem Hamed

Cardiff Arms Park
- Cricket ground
- Aerial view of the cricket ground
- Interactive map of Cardiff Arms Park
- Location: Cardiff, Wales
- Coordinates: 51°28′47″N 3°11′1″W
- Owner: Cardiff Athletic Club
- Capacity: 7,000
- Surface: Grass

Construction
- Opened: 1848
- Closed: 1966
- Demolished: 1966

Tenants
- Glamorgan County Cricket Club; Cardiff Cricket Club

Cardiff Arms Park (Welsh: Parc yr Arfau Caerdydd), also known as the Arms Park, is a stadium in the centre of Cardiff, Wales, next to the Millennium Stadium. Primarily a rugby union stadium, it also has a bowling green. The Arms Park was host to the British Empire and Commonwealth Games in 1958.

The first stands were built on the ground in 1881–1882. Originally the Arms Park had a cricket ground to the north and a rugby union stadium to the south. By 1969, the cricket ground had been demolished to make way for the present day rugby ground to the north and a larger rugby stadium to the south, the National Stadium. The National Stadium, which was used by the Wales national rugby union team, was officially opened on 7 April 1984, and was itself usually called Cardiff Arms Park. In 1997 it was demolished to make way for the Millennium Stadium, which hosted the 1999 Rugby World Cup and became the national stadium of Wales. The rugby ground has remained the home of the semi-professional Cardiff RFC; the professional Cardiff Blues regional team moved to the Cardiff City Stadium in 2009, but returned three years later.

The site is owned by Cardiff Athletic Club and, as well as rugby union and cricket has been host to sports including athletics, association football, greyhound racing, tennis, British baseball and boxing. The site also has a bowling green to the north of the rugby ground, which is used by Cardiff Athletic Bowls Club, the bowls section of the Cardiff Athletic Club. The stadium also hosted concerts including Michael Jackson, Dire Straits, David Bowie, Bon Jovi, The Rolling Stones and U2.

== History ==
=== Early history of the site ===
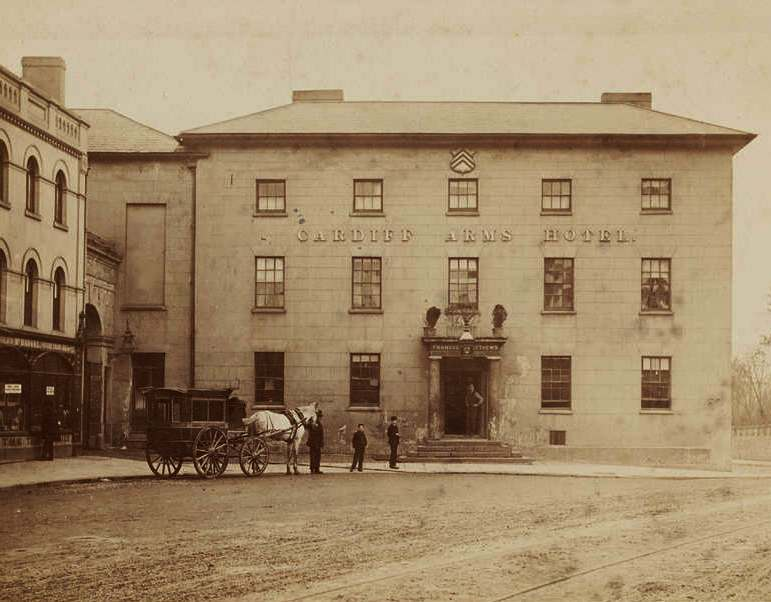
Cardiff Arms Hotel

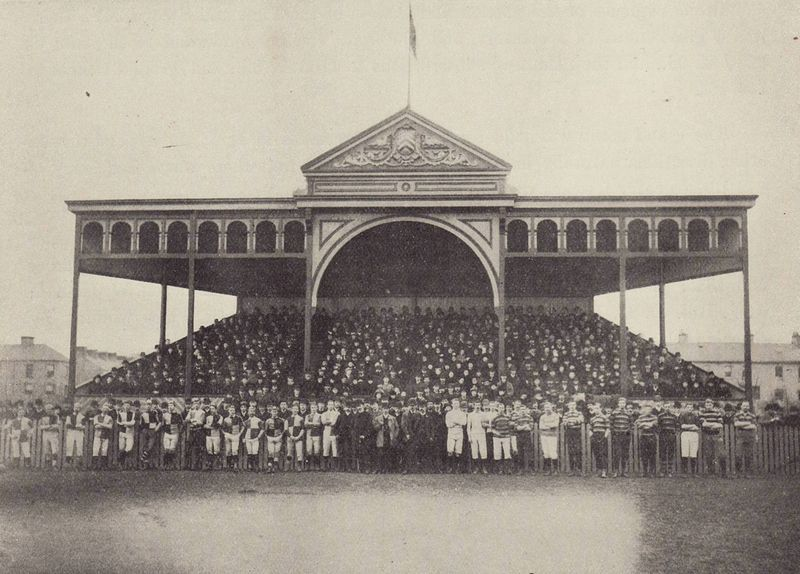
The inauguration of the Grandstand on 26 December 1885

Cardiff Arms Park was originally a swampy meadow called Great Park, located near to an old Mail-Coach house named the Tŷ Coch (English: Red House). Built on Broad Street during the reign of Charles I by Sir Thomas Morgan, This building would become known in English as the Cardiff Arms Hotel, after the County Badge located above the buildings entrance. From 1803, both the hotel and park became the property of the Bute family, with "The Arms Park" now known as a place for sporting events. By 1848, Cardiff Cricket Club was using the site for its cricket matches. However, by 1878, Cardiff Arms Hotel itself had been demolished.

The 3rd Marquess of Bute stipulated that the ground could only be used for "recreational purposes". At that time Cardiff Arms Park had a cricket ground to the north and a rugby union ground to the south. 1881–2 saw the first stands for spectators; they held 300 spectators and cost £50. The architect was Archibald Leitch, who also designed Ibrox Stadium and Old Trafford. In 1890, new standing areas were constructed along the entire length of the ground, with additional stands erected in 1896.

=== 1912 redevelopment ===
By 1912, the Cardiff Football Ground, as it was then known, had a new south stand and temporary stands on the north, east and west ends of the ground. The south stand was covered, while the north terrace was initially without a roof. The improvements were partly funded by the Welsh Rugby Union (WRU). The opening ceremony took place on 5 October 1912, with a match between Newport RFC and Cardiff RFC. The new ground was opened by Lord Ninian Crichton-Stuart. This new development increased the ground capacity to 43,000 and much improved facilities at the ground compared to the earlier stands.

In 1922, The 4th Marquess of Bute sold the entire site and it was bought by the Cardiff Arms Park Company Limited for £30,000. It was then leased to the Cardiff Athletic Club (cricket and rugby sections) for 99 years at a cost of £200 per annum.

=== North and South Stand redevelopments ===
The 1934 new North Stand, rugby ground, Cardiff Arms Park

During 1934 the cricket pavilion had been demolished to make way for the new North Stand which was built on the rugby union ground, costing around £20,000. However, in 1941 the new North Stand and part of the west terracing was badly damaged in the Blitz by the Luftwaffe during the Second World War.

At a general meeting of the WRU in June 1953 they made a decision "That until such time as the facilities at Swansea were improved, all international matches be played at Cardiff". At the same time, plans were made for a new South Stand which was estimated to cost £60,000; the tender price, however, came out at £90,000, so a compromise was made and it was decided to build a new upper South Stand costing £64,000 instead, with the Cardiff Athletic Club contributing £15,000 and the remainder coming from the WRU. The new South Stand opened in 1956, in time for the 1958 British Empire and Commonwealth Games. This brought the overall capacity of the Arms Park up to 60,000 spectators, of which 12,800 were seated and the remainder standing.

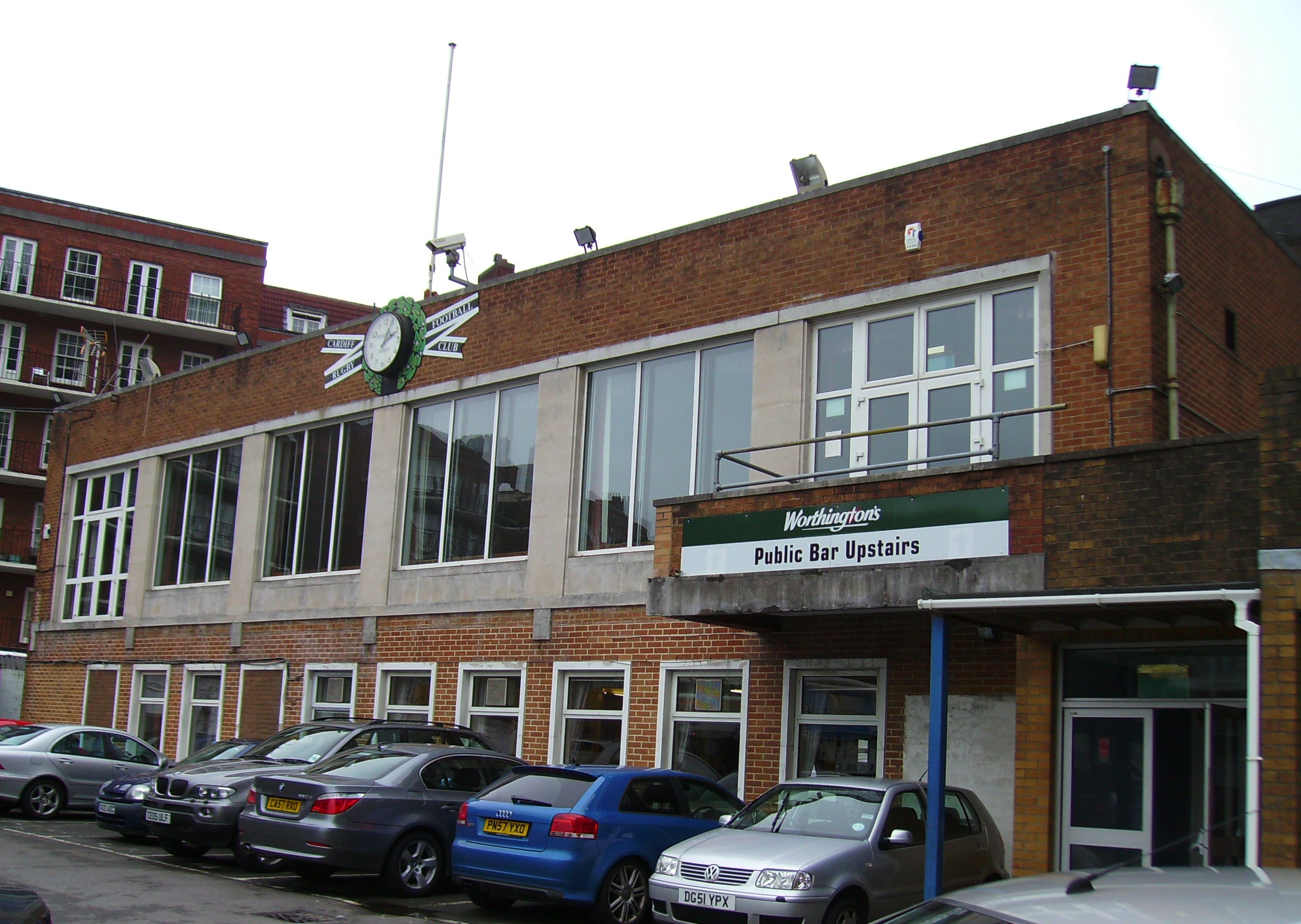
Cardiff Athletic Club

The Arms Park hosted the 1958 British Empire and Commonwealth Games, which was used for the athletics events, but this event caused damage to the drainage system, so much so, that other rugby unions (England, Scotland and Ireland) complained after the Games about the state of the pitch. On 4 December 1960, due to torrential rain, the River Taff burst its banks with the Arms Park pitch being left under 4 feet (1.2 m) of water. The Development Committee was set up to resolve these issues on a permanent basis. They looked at various sites in Cardiff, but they all proved to be unsatisfactory. They also could not agree a solution with the Cardiff Athletic Club, so they purchased about 80 acres (320,000 m^{2}) of land at Island Farm in Bridgend, which was previously used as a prisoner-of-war camp. It is best known for being the camp where the biggest escape attempt was made by German prisoners of war in Great Britain during the Second World War. Due to problems including transport issues Glamorgan County Council never gave outline planning permission for the proposals and by June 1964 the scheme was abandoned. At that stage, the cricket ground to the north was still being used by Glamorgan County Cricket Club, and the rugby union ground to the south was used by the national Wales team and Cardiff RFC.

By 7 October 1966, the first floodlit game was held at Cardiff Arms Park, a game in which Cardiff RFC beat the Barbarians by 12 points to 8.

=== National Stadium redevelopment ===
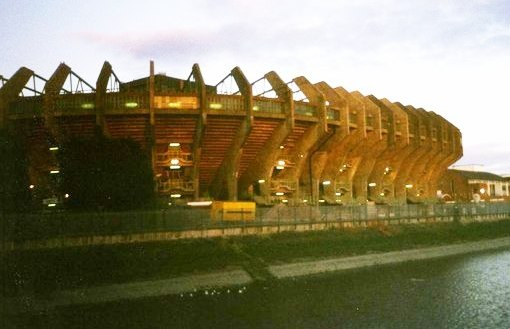
The National Stadium

The National Stadium, which was previously known as the Welsh National Rugby Ground, was designed by Osborne V Webb & Partners and built by G A Williamson & Associates of Porthcawl and Andrew Scott & Company of Port Talbot. In 1969 construction began on the stadium which replaced the existing rugby ground built in 1881. The stadium was home to the Wales national rugby union team since 1964 and the Wales national football team since 1989. In 1997 the stadium was demolished to make way for the new Millennium Stadium.

=== Millennium Stadium ===
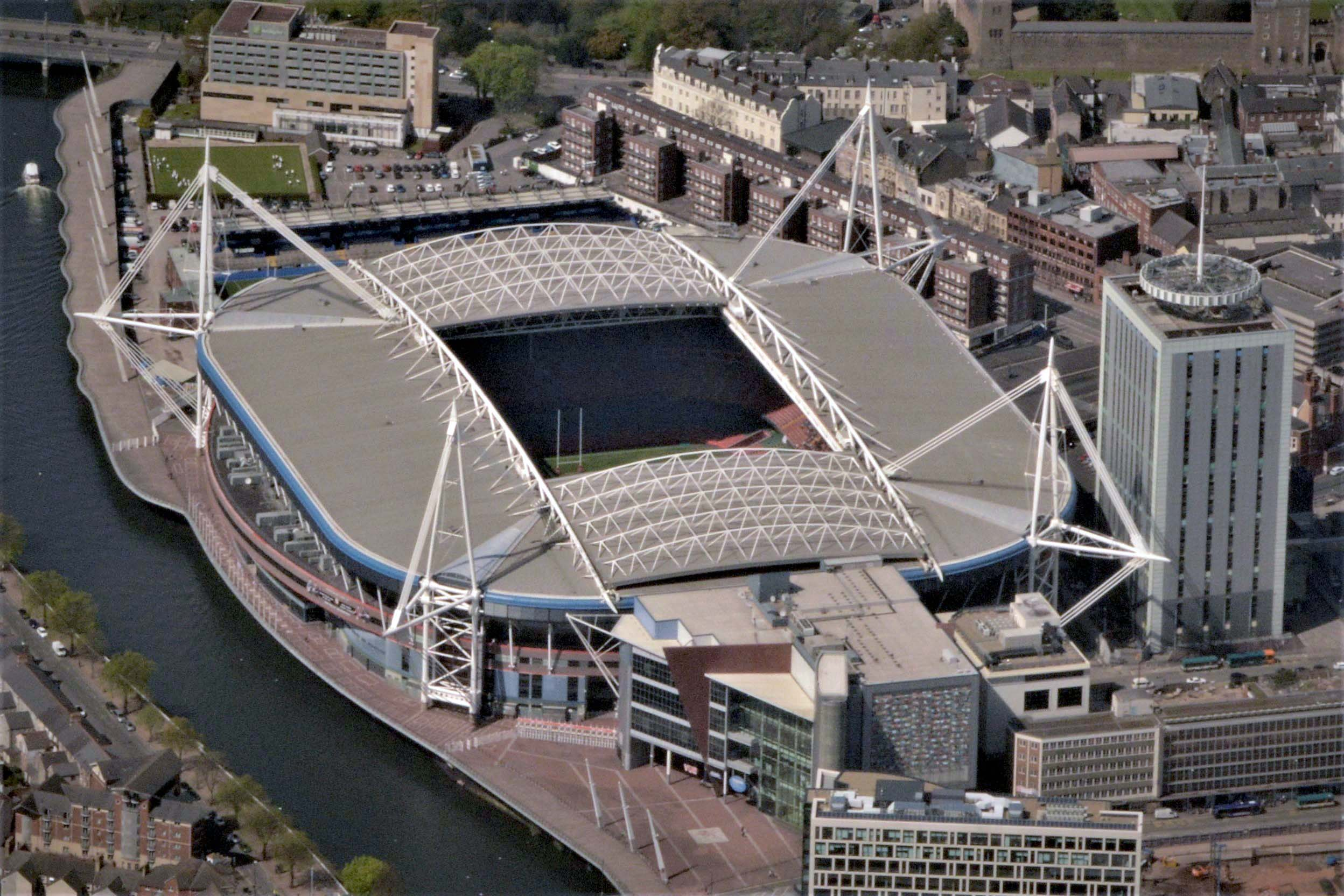
The Millennium Stadium

Thirteen years after the National Stadium had opened in 1984, it was considered too small and did not have the facilities required of the time and it was demolished and a new stadium, the Millennium Stadium, was built in its place (completed to a north–south alignment and opened in June 1999). This would become the fourth redevelopment on the site.

Construction involved the demolition of a number of buildings, primarily the existing National Stadium, Wales Empire Pool in Wood Street, Cardiff Empire Telephone Exchange building and the newly built Territorial Auxiliary and Volunteer Reserve building both in Park Street, and the Social Security offices in Westgate Street. The Millennium Stadium is now on roughly two-thirds of the National Stadium, but it no longer uses the Arms Park name. Since 2016, it has been known as the Principality Stadium.

== Current site ==
=== Rugby ground ===
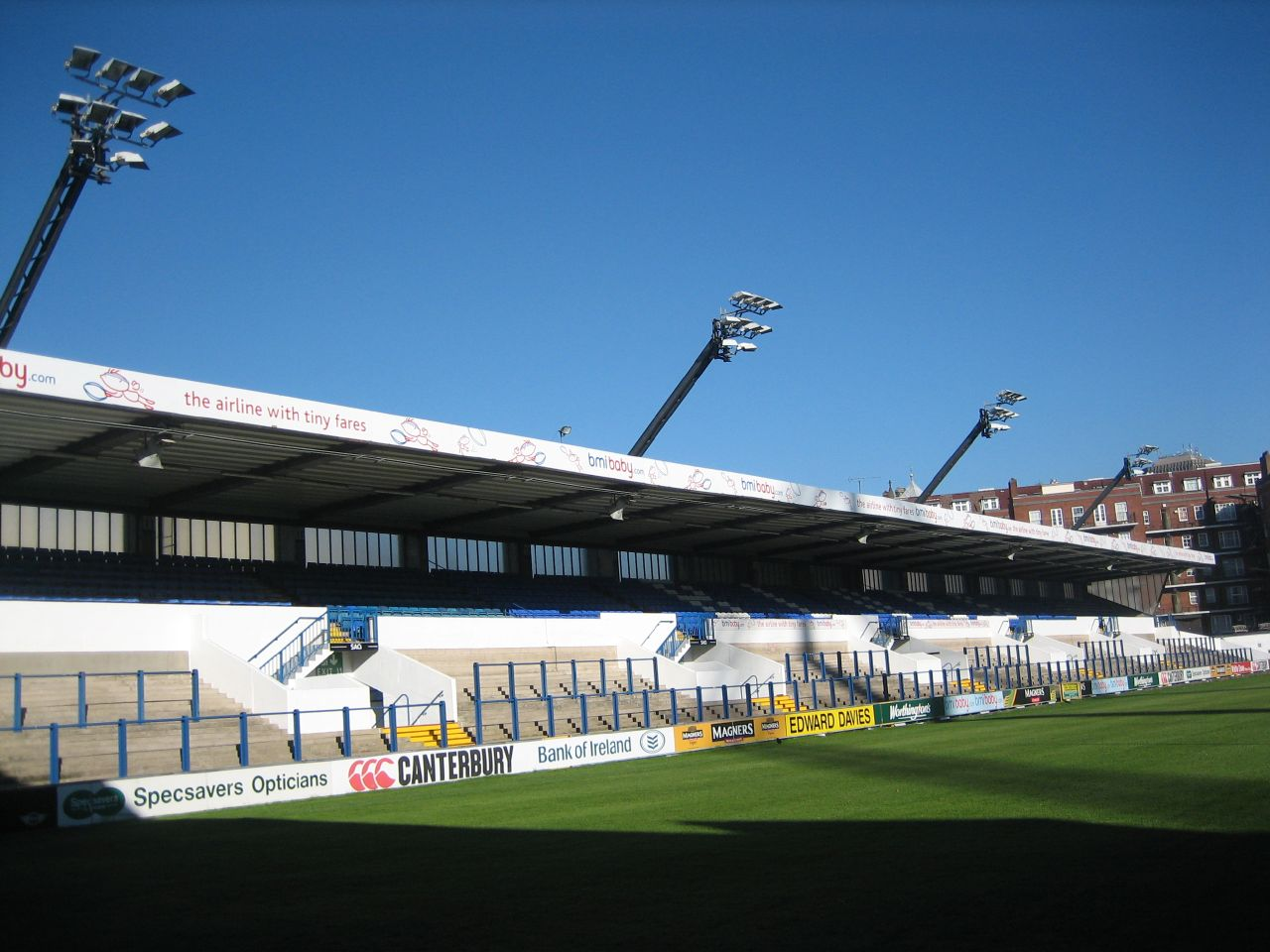
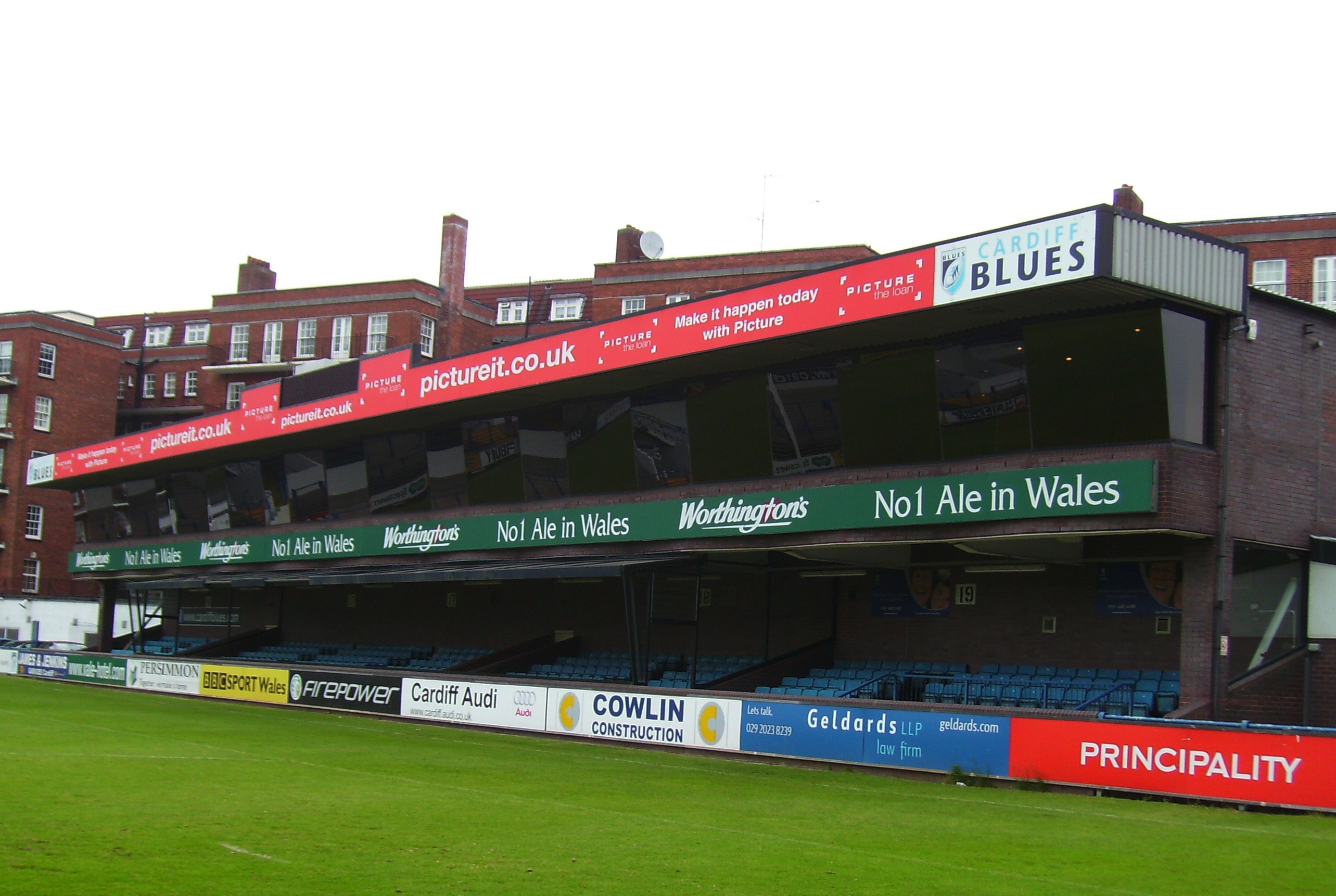
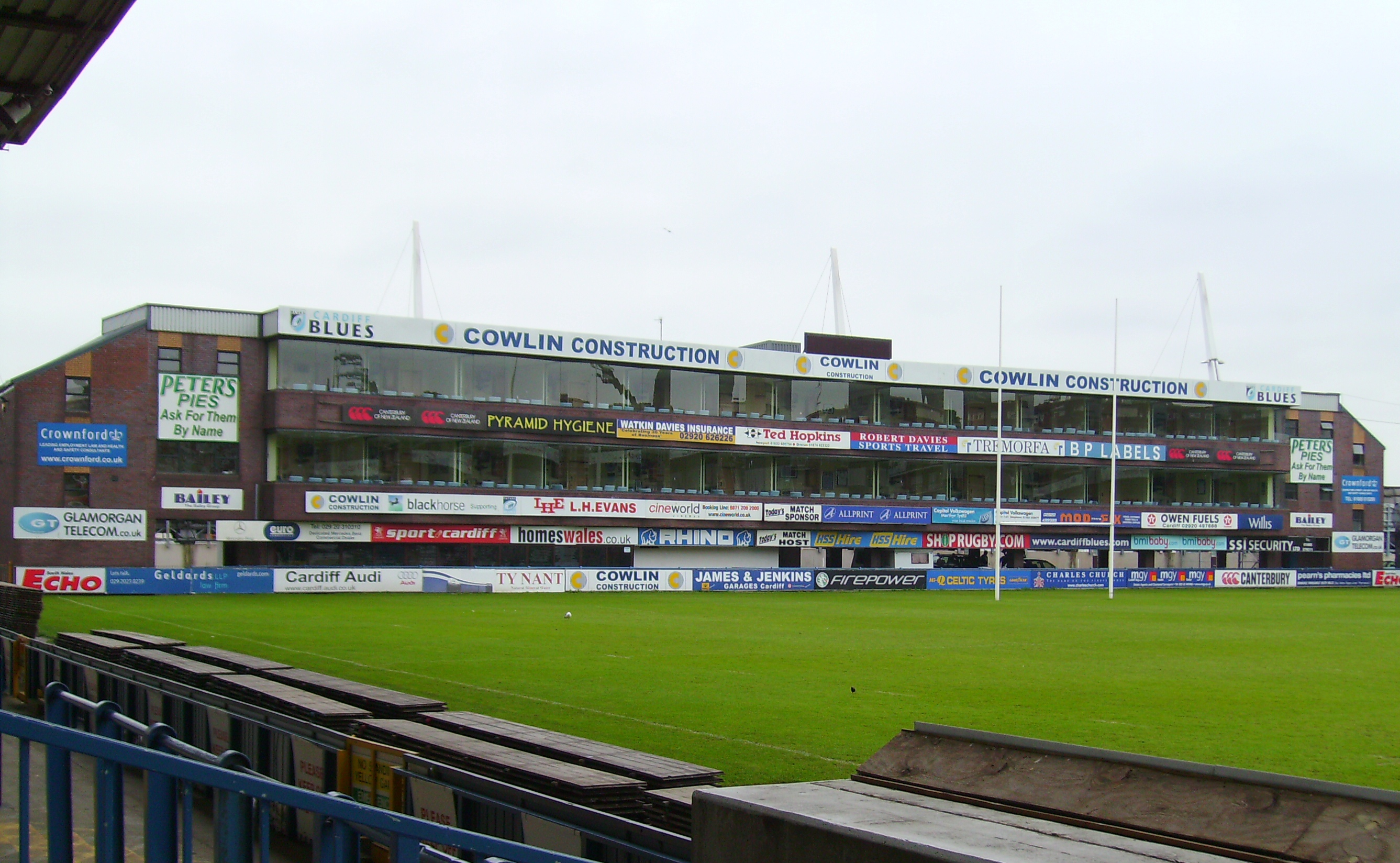
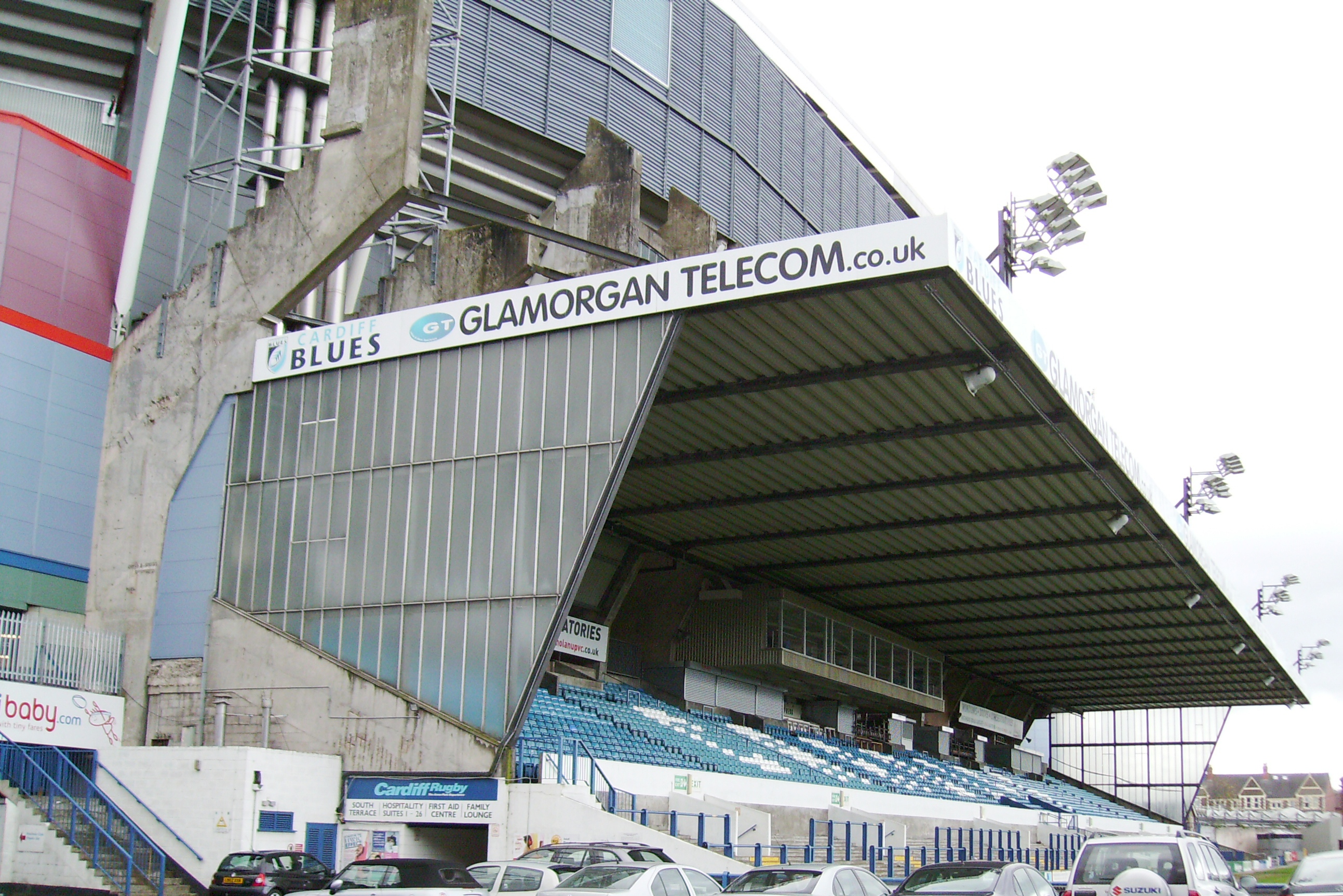
The rugby ground stands. Clockwise from upper left:
The North Stand, the Family Stand (east stand), the Peter Thomas Stand (south stand), Hospitality Boxes (west stand).

Only the rugby ground and the Cardiff Athletic Bowls Club now use the name Cardiff Arms Park. The rugby ground has two main stands, the North Stand and the South Stand. Both the Stands have terracing below seating. The other stands in the ground are the Westgate Street end Family Stand, which has rows of seating below executive boxes, plus the club shop, and the River Taff end (the Barry Nelmes Suite, named after Barry Nelmes, the former Cardiff RFC captain), which has 26 executive boxes. The rugby ground has two main entrances, the south entrance, and the Gwyn Nicholls Memorial Gates (Angel Hotel entrance), which was unveiled on 26 December 1949 in honour of the Welsh international rugby player Gwyn Nicholls. The Cardiff Athletic Clubhouse is situated in the corner of the ground between the South Stand and the Westgate Street end.

Entrances to the Arms Park
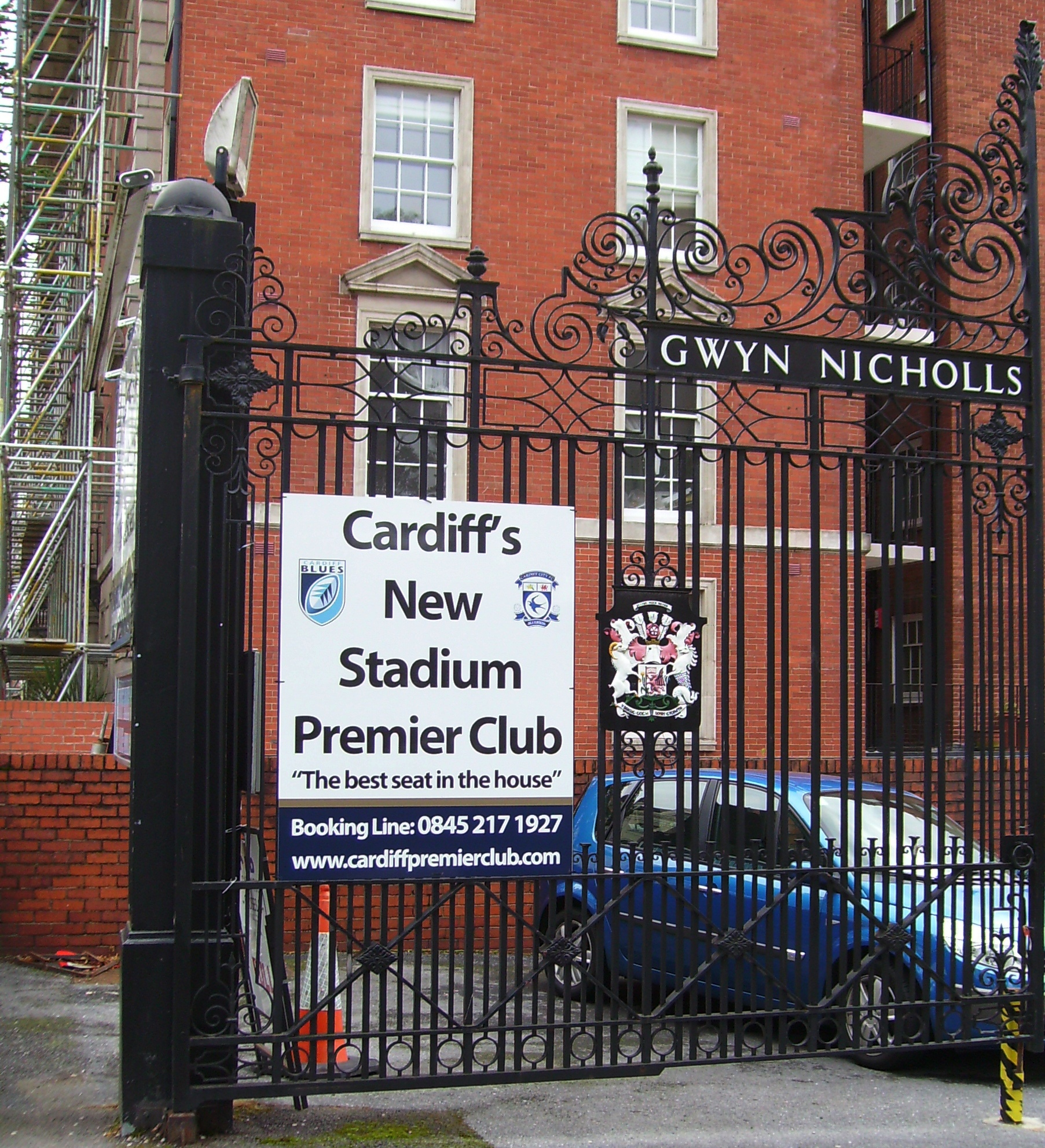
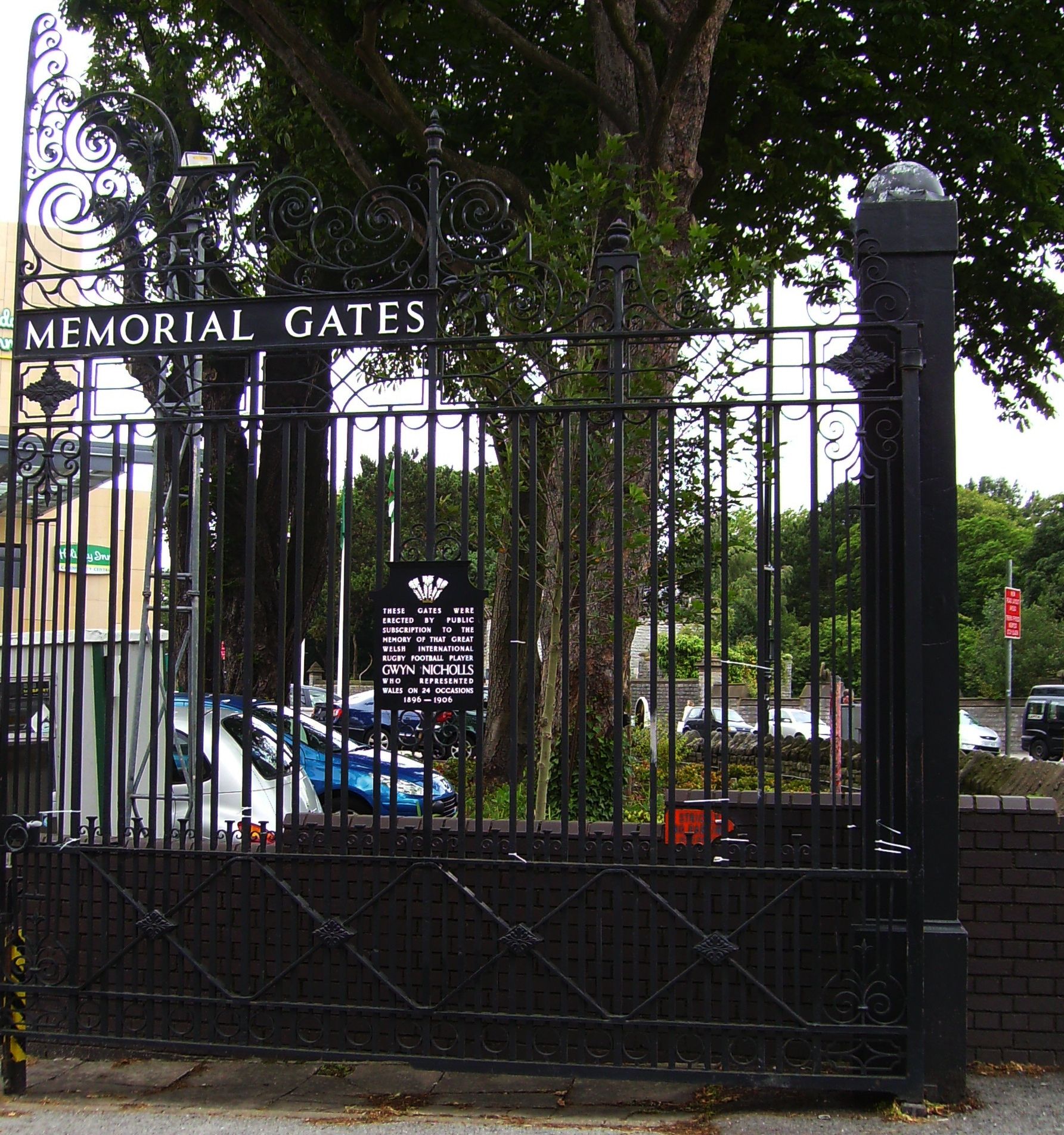
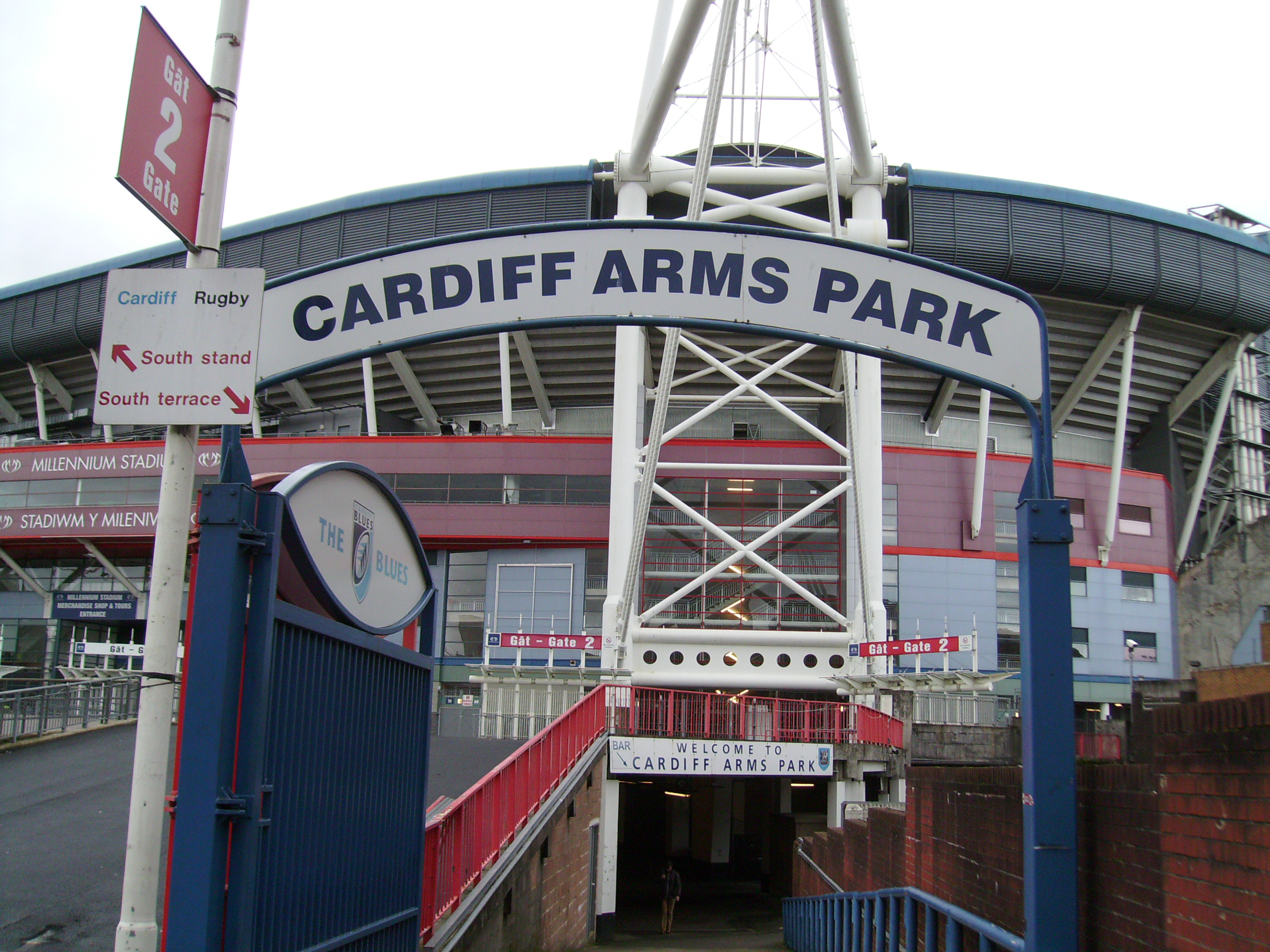
Gwyn Nicholls Memorial Gates (Angel Hotel entrance) and the Quay Street entrance (right).

The South Stand of the rugby ground formed a complete unit with the North Stand of the National Stadium. Now the same structure of the South Stand of the rugby ground is also physically attached to the North Stand of the Millennium Stadium. This section is known colloquially as Glanmor's Gap, after Glanmor Griffiths, former chair and President of the WRU. This came about because the WRU were unable to secure enough funding to include the North Stand in the Millennium Stadium, and the National Lottery Commission would not provide any additional funds to be used for the construction of a new ground for Cardiff RFC. The Millennium Stadium was therefore built with the old reinforced concrete structure of the National Stadium (North Stand) and the new steel Millennium Stadium structure built around it.

There was doubt about the future of the Arms Park after 2010 following the move of the Cardiff Blues to the Cardiff City Stadium. Cardiff RFC Ltd, the company that runs Cardiff Blues and Cardiff RFC, still has a 15-year lease on the Arms Park, but talks are underway to release the rugby club from the terms of the lease, to enable the Millennium Stadium to be redeveloped with a new North Stand and adjoining convention centre. However, it still has the original requirement on the lease, that the land will only be used for "recreational purposes", as stipulated by the Bute family. But the Arms Park site is a prime piece of real estate in the centre of Cardiff, which means that it may be difficult to sell the land to property developers. The estimated value of the whole Arms Park site could be at least £25 million, although with the "recreational use" requirement, its actual value could be a lot less than that figure. A decision by Cardiff Athletic Club on the future of the Arms Park has yet to be made. In 2011, the Cardiff Blues regional rugby union team made a £6 million bid for the Arms Park, later the WRU made an increased bid of £10 million for the site. Both bids were rejected by the trustees of the Cardiff Athletic Club. However, in 2012 Cardiff Blues announced that they would be making a permanent return to Cardiff Arms Park following declining attendances at the Cardiff City Stadium. During the 2013 off-season, the pitch at the rugby ground was replaced with an all weather 3G (third generation) artificial turf surface from FieldTurf at a cost of £400,000, intended to prevent any adverse weather conditions from affecting the rugby.

Proposed redevelopment

An agreement in principle was reached in December 2015 between the landlord of the stadium site (Cardiff Athletic Club) and its tenant (Cardiff Blues) to give the club a 150-year lease on the stadium site. This could see the redevelopment of the Arms Park, including a new 15,000 seater stadium at 90 degrees to the existing stadium costing between £20 million and £30 million and surrounded by new offices and apartments. If the final agreement goes ahead, Cardiff Athletic Club would receive an upfront payment of approximately £8 million. As part of the agreement, the bowls section would have to vacate its current site at the Arms Park and move to a new facility. At present Cardiff Blues pay Cardiff Athletic Club rent of around £115,000 per annum, however this would nearly double to around £200,000.

=== Bowling green ===
Cardiff Athletic Bowls Club, Cardiff Arms Park

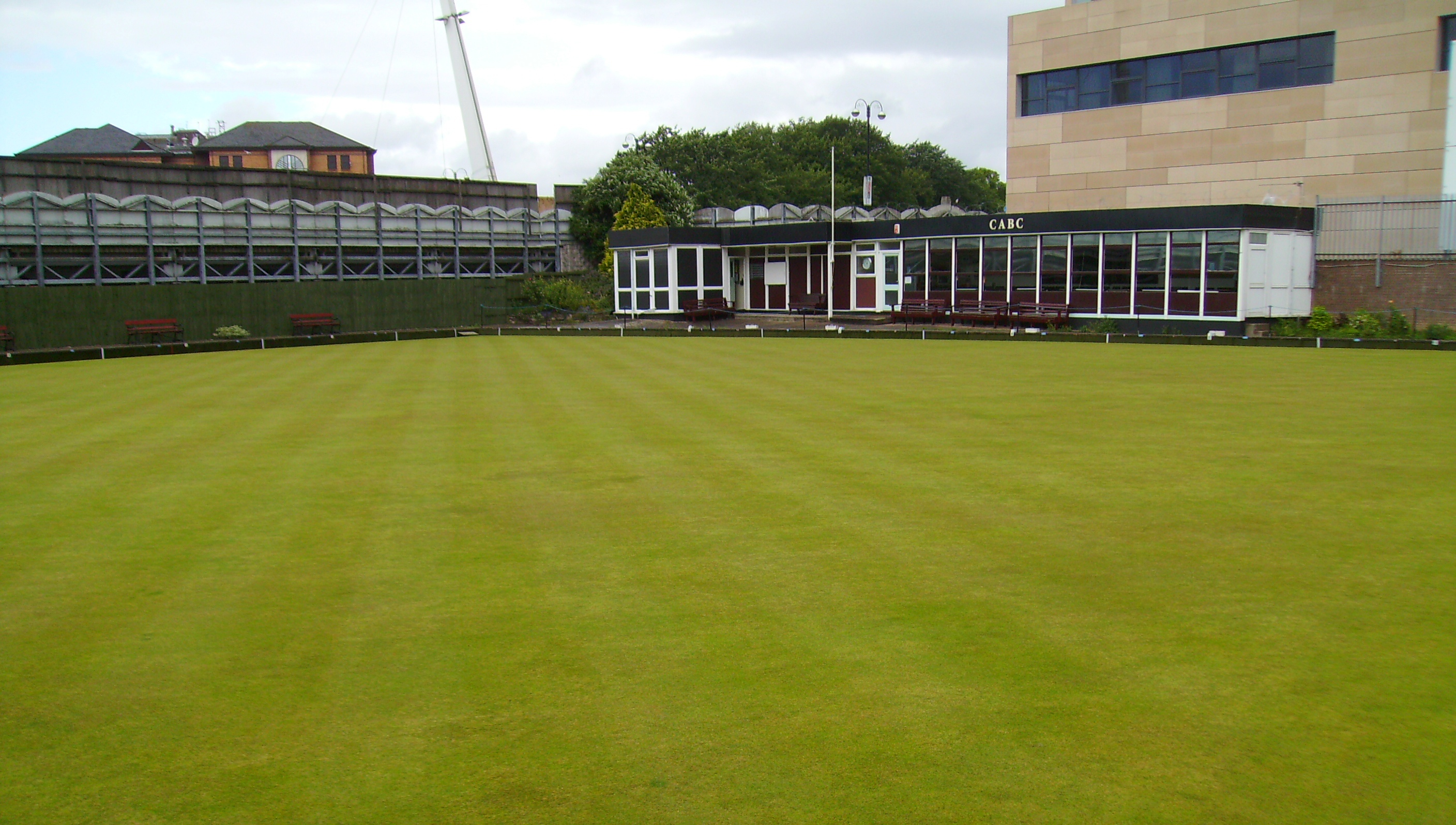
The clubhouse and bowling green

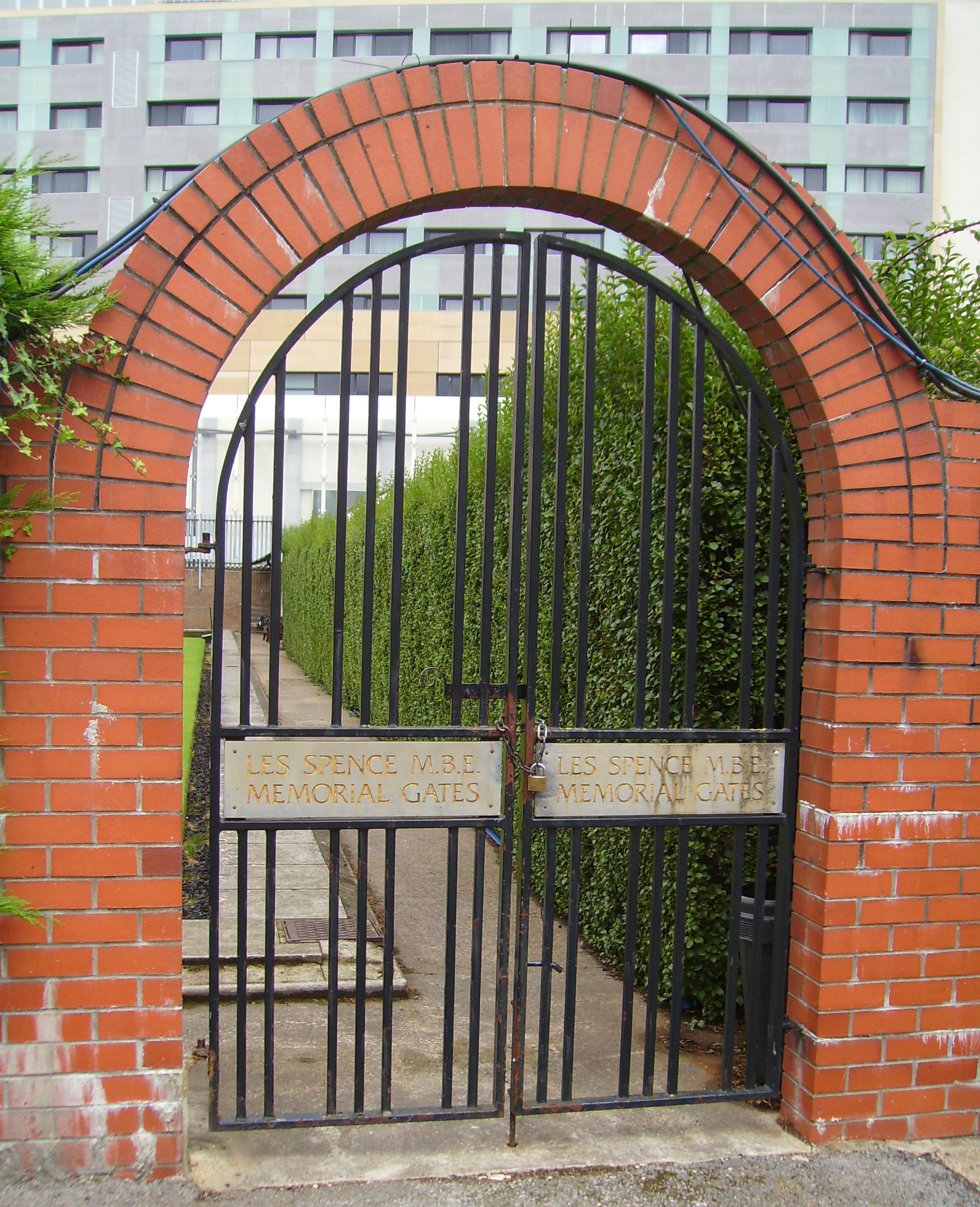
Les Spence MBE Memorial Gates

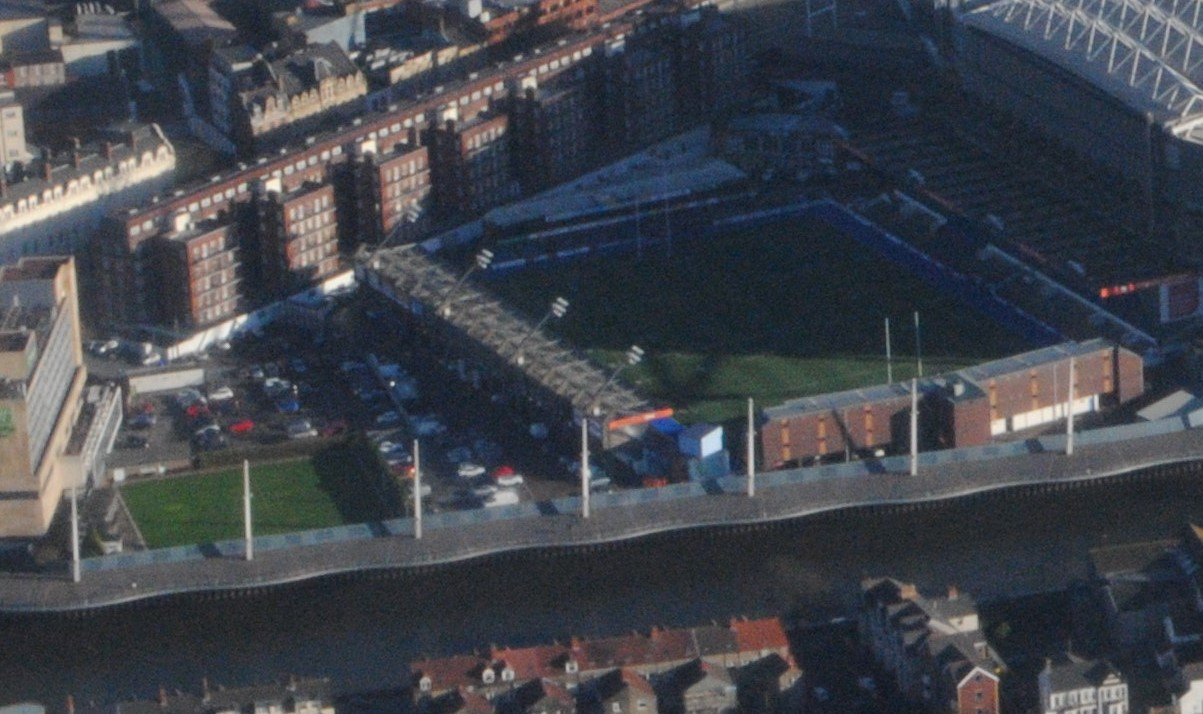
The bowling green (left) and the rugby ground (right)

Cardiff Arms Park is best known as a rugby union stadium, but Cardiff Athletic Bowls Club (CABC) was established in 1923, and ever since then, the club has used the Arms Park as its bowling green. The bowls club is a section of the Cardiff Athletic Club and shares many of the facilities of the Cardiff Arms Park athletics centre.

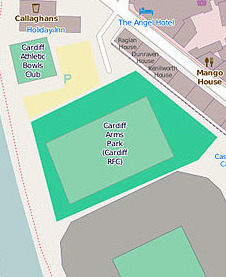
Cardiff Arms Park including Cardiff Athletic Bowls Club

The Les Spence Memorial Gates were erected in memory of the former Cardiff RFU player, who captained the team in 1936–37. He was born in 1907 and became chairman of the Cardiff RFU and president of the WRU between 1973 and 1974. He was awarded an MBE and died in 1988.

The club has produced two Welsh international bowlers; Mr. C Standfast in 1937 and Mr. B Hawkins who represented Wales in the 1982 World Pairs and captained Wales in 1982 and 1984.

== Usage ==
=== Association football ===
The Riverside Football Club, founded in 1899, played some matches at the Arms Park until 1910, when they moved to Ninian Park, and later became Cardiff City Football Club.

On 31 May 1989, Wales played its first international game against West Germany at the National Stadium in a World Cup qualifying match, which ended goalless. It was also the first ever international football match held in Great Britain that was watched by all-seater spectators.

The adjoining Cardiff Rugby Club ground has also been used for Association Football. In July 1995, Ton Pentre played two Intertoto Cup games there, against Heerenveen (Netherlands) and Uniao Leiria (Portugal) as their own ground was not suitable. The Heerenveen game - the first ever soccer match to be played there - kicked off at 6pm on Saturday 1 July 1995 and resulted in the Dutch side winning 7–0. The Wales U-21 team have also played a home game there in the late 1990s.

On 5 April 2017, the ground was used to host the men's and women's football matches as part of the 2017 Welsh Varsity, between Cardiff University and Swansea University. The women's game finished in a 1-1 draw, while the men's game resulted in a 1-0 win for Swansea.

=== Athletics ===
In 1958, the British Empire and Commonwealth Games were held in Cardiff. The event was (to date) the biggest sporting event ever held in Wales; however, it would not have been possible without the financial support given by the WRU and the Cardiff Athletic Club. Both the opening and closing ceremonies took place at Cardiff Arms Park, plus all the track and field events, on what had been the greyhound track. It would turn out to be the last time that South Africa would participate in the Games until 1994. South Africa withdrew from the Commonwealth Games in 1961.

=== Baseball and British baseball ===
Baseball was established early on in Cardiff, and one of the earliest of games to be held at the Arms Park was on 18 May 1918. It was a charity match in aid of the Prisoner of War Fund between Welsh and American teams of the U.S. Beaufort and U.S. Jupiter. British baseball matches have also regularly taken place at the Arms Park and hosted the annual England versus Wales international game every four years. The games are now usually held at Roath Park.

=== Boxing ===
The first boxing contest held at the Arms Park was on 24 January 1914, when Bombardier Billy Wells beat Gaston Pigot by a knockout in the first round of a 20-round contest. Boxing contests were held later on 14 June 1943, 12 August 1944, 4 October 1951 and 10 September 1952.

Around 25,000 spectators watched international boxing on 1 October 1993, at the National Stadium with a World Boxing Council (WBC) Heavyweight title bout between Lennox Lewis and Frank Bruno. It was the first time that two British-born boxers had fought for the world heavyweight title. Lewis beat Bruno by a technical knockout in the 7th round, in what was called the "Battle of Britain". On 30 September 1995, Steve Robinson the World Boxing Organization (WBO) World Featherweight Champion, lost against Prince Naseem Hamed at the rugby ground in 8 rounds.

=== Cricket ===
In 1819, Cardiff Cricket Club was formed and by 1848 they had moved to their new home at the Arms Park. Glamorgan County Cricket Club, at the time not a first-class county, played their first match at the ground in June 1869 against Monmouthshire Cricket Club. The county club played their first County Championship match on the ground in 1921, competing there every season (except while first-class cricket was suspended during the Second World War) until their final match on the ground against Somerset in August 1966.

Cardiff Cricket Club played their final game at the ground against Lydney Cricket Club on 17 September 1966. Both Cardiff Cricket Club and Glamorgan then moved to a new ground at Sophia Gardens on the opposite bank of the River Taff to the Arms Park following work on the creation of the national rugby stadium.

The first first-class cricket match to be held on the ground was between West of England and East of England, on 20 June 1910. In all more than 240 first-class matches were played on the ground, all but two involving Glamorgan as the home team. Only one List A cricket match was played on the ground, Glamorgan's Gillette Cup fixture against Somerset on 22 May 1963.

=== Greyhound racing ===
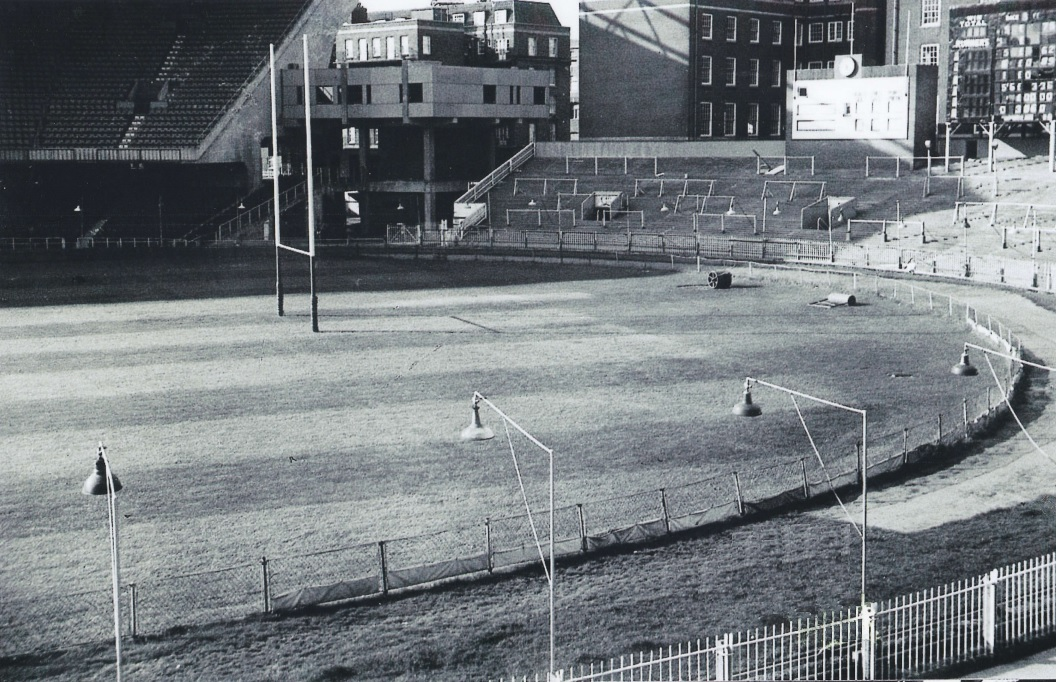
Part of the greyhound track at the National Stadium with part of the North Stand (top left), offices (top middle) and part of the East Terrace (top right).

Greyhound racing took place at the Arms Park for fifty years from 1927 until 1977.

=== Rugby union ===
In 1876, the Cardiff RFC was formed and soon after they also used the park. On 12 April 1884, the first international match was played at the ground between Wales and Ireland, when 5,000 people watched Wales beat Ireland by two tries and a drop goal to nil.

The Arms Park rugby ground became the permanent home of the Wales national rugby union team in 1964. Later, the National Stadium was also home to the WRU Challenge Cup from 1972 until the match held at the Stadium on 26 April 1997, at a much reduced capacity, between Cardiff RFC and Swansea RFC. Cardiff RFC won the match 33–26.

The game (between the Barbarians and the New Zealand All Blacks) is one I will never forget and those of us who played in it will never be allowed to forget. It is a match that will live with me forever. People tend only to remember the first four minutes of the game because of the try, but what they forgot is the great deal of good rugby played afterwards, much of which came from the All Blacks. After the success of the 1971 Lions tour, which captured the imagination of the whole country, it was an opportunity to bring a lot of that side together again.

— Gareth Edwards

The National Stadium is best known as the venue for what is considered to be "the greatest try ever scored" by Gareth Edwards for the Barbarians against New Zealand in what is also called "the greatest match ever played" on 27 January 1973. The final result was a win for the Barbarians. The score, 23–11, which translates to 27–13 in today's scoring system.

The scorers were:
Barbarians: Tries: Gareth Edwards, Fergus Slattery, John Bevan, J P R Williams; Conversions: Phil Bennett (2); Penalty: Phil Bennett.
All Blacks: Tries: Grant Batty (2); Penalty: Joseph Karam.

The National Stadium hosted four games in the 1991 Rugby World Cup, including the third-place play-off. The National Stadium was also host to the inaugural Heineken Cup final of 1995–96 when Toulouse beat Cardiff RFC by 21–18 after extra time, in front of 21,800 spectators. The following final in 1996–97 was also held at the National Stadium, this time it was between Brive and Leicester Tigers. Brive won the match 28–9, in front of a crowd of 41,664.

In 2008, the rugby ground hosted all the games in Pool A of the 2008 IRB Junior World Championship and also the semi-final on 18 June 2008, in which England beat South Africa 26–18.

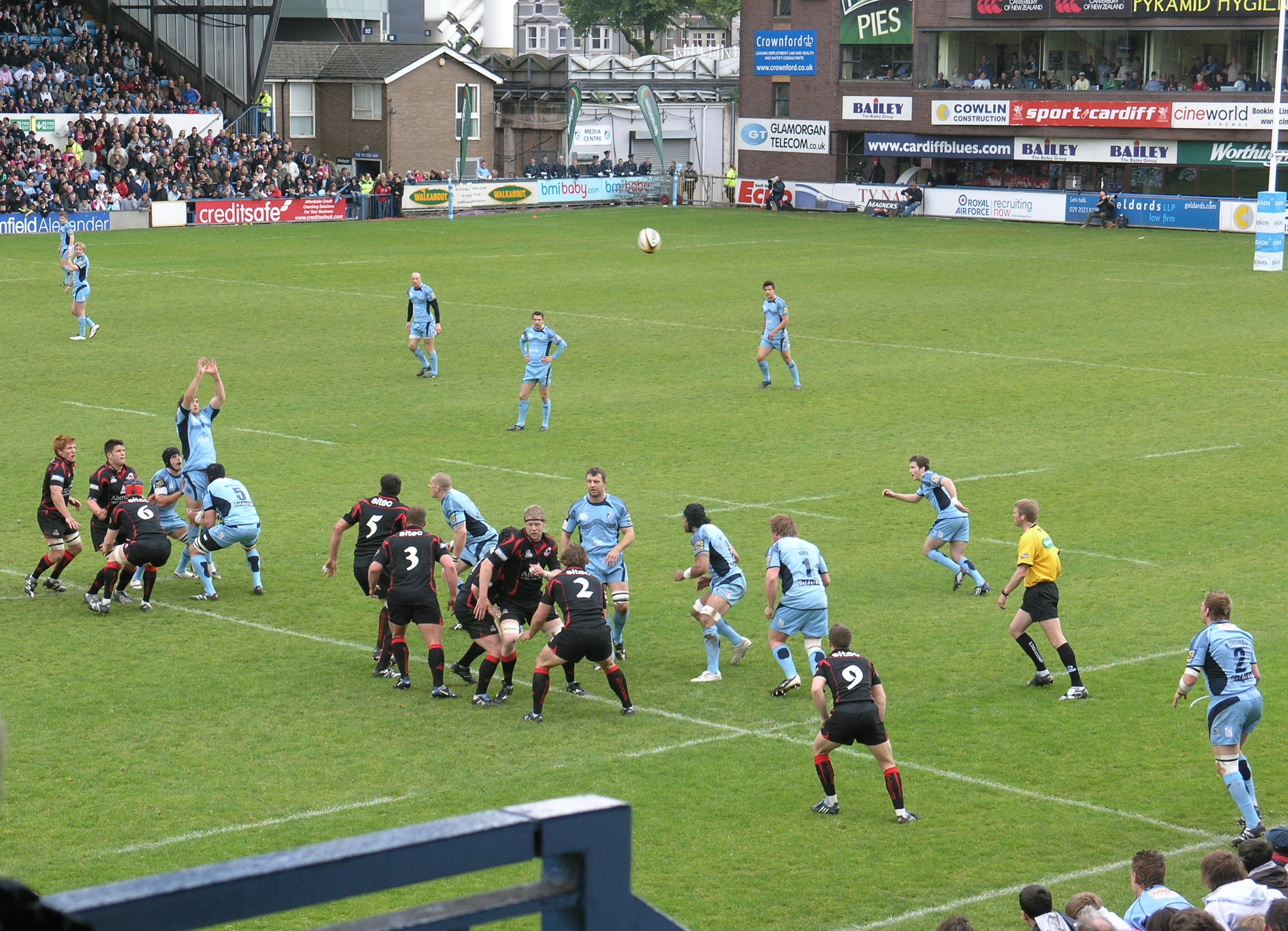
Cardiff Blues versus Edinburgh, 17 May 2009

Until February 2012, it had been assumed that the last professional rugby union game to take place at the Arms Park was on 17 May 2009, when Edinburgh beat the Cardiff Blues 36–14 in a Celtic League match during the 2008–09 season.

However, on Tuesday, 7 February 2012, it was confirmed that Cardiff Blues would face Connacht at the Arms Park on Friday, 10 February 2012. The Pro12 League game result was a win for the Cardiff Blues 22–15 and attendance of 8,000. The following Tuesday, it was announced that the match against Ulster on Friday, 17 February, would also be at the Arms Park, resulting in a Blues win, 21–14 and attendance of 8,600. The agreement signed during 2009 tied Cardiff Blues to a 20-year contract to play a maximum of 18 games per season for a set fee, rather than per match at Cardiff City Stadium. But on 23 February, it was announced that the two Welsh 'derbies' against the Scarlets and the Ospreys would be played at Cardiff City Stadium, rather than the Arms Park, because of Cardiff Blues' anticipation that the attendance figures would far exceed the maximum capacity of 9,000. On 8 May 2012, it was announced that Cardiff Blues would be returning to the Arms Park on a permanent basis after just three years at the Cardiff City Stadium.

On 23 May 2014, the rugby ground hosted the final of the 2013–14 Amlin Challenge Cup in which Northampton Saints beat Bath 30–16.

Rugby World Cup

Cardiff Arms Park hosted matches of the 1991 Rugby World Cup.

| Date | Competition | Home team | | Away team | | Attendance |
|---|---|---|---|---|---|---|
| 6 October 1991 | 1991 Rugby World Cup Pool 3 | Wales | 13 | Western Samoa | 16 | 45,000 |
| 9 October 1991 | 1991 Rugby World Cup Pool 3 | Wales | 16 | Argentina | 7 | 35,000 |
| 12 October 1991 | 1991 Rugby World Cup Pool 3 | Wales | 3 | Australia | 38 | 54,000 |
| 30 October 1991 | 1991 Rugby World Cup Third-place play-off | New Zealand | 13 | Scotland | 6 | 47,000 |

=== Rugby league ===
South Wales Scorpions played a Rugby League Championship 1 match against London Skolars at Cardiff Arms Park on Sunday, 27 July 2014 and on Sunday 10 May 2015 at Cardiff Arms Park, South Wales Scorpions took on North Wales Crusaders. The 2015 European Cup match between France and Wales was held at Cardiff Arms Park on Friday on 30 October 2015.

Cardiff City Blue Dragons have used the stadium for various matches including a pre season friendly v South Wales Scorpions in 2015.

The highest attendance for a rugby league game at the Arms Park was recorded on 8 June 1996 during the first Super League season when 6,708 saw St. Helens defeat the Sheffield Eagles 43–32. The St Helens team at the time contained Welsh players Anthony Sullivan, Karle Hammond and Keiron Cunningham.

Rugby league test matches

List of rugby league test matches played at Cardiff Arms Park.

| Test# | Date | Result | Attendance | Notes |
|---|---|---|---|---|
| 1 | 26 June 1996 | England 26–12 Wales | 5,425 | 1996 European Rugby League Championship |
| 2 | 30 October 2015 | Wales 14–6 France | 1,028 | 2015 European Cup |

=== Tennis ===
Tennis courts were laid out in the Arms Park for Cardiff Tennis Club until the club moved to Sophia Gardens in 1967. In 2003, the club amalgamated with Lisvane Tennis Club to form Lisvane (CAC) Tennis Club, which is still a section of Cardiff Athletic Club (CAC).

=== Music concerts ===
Major music concerts were also held at the National Stadium from 1987 until 1996, they included Tina Turner, U2, Michael Jackson, The Rolling Stones, Dire Straits, Bon Jovi and R.E.M. The last music concert was held on 14 July 1996. Jehovah's Witnesses held their annual conventions at the National Stadium.

== Singing tradition ==
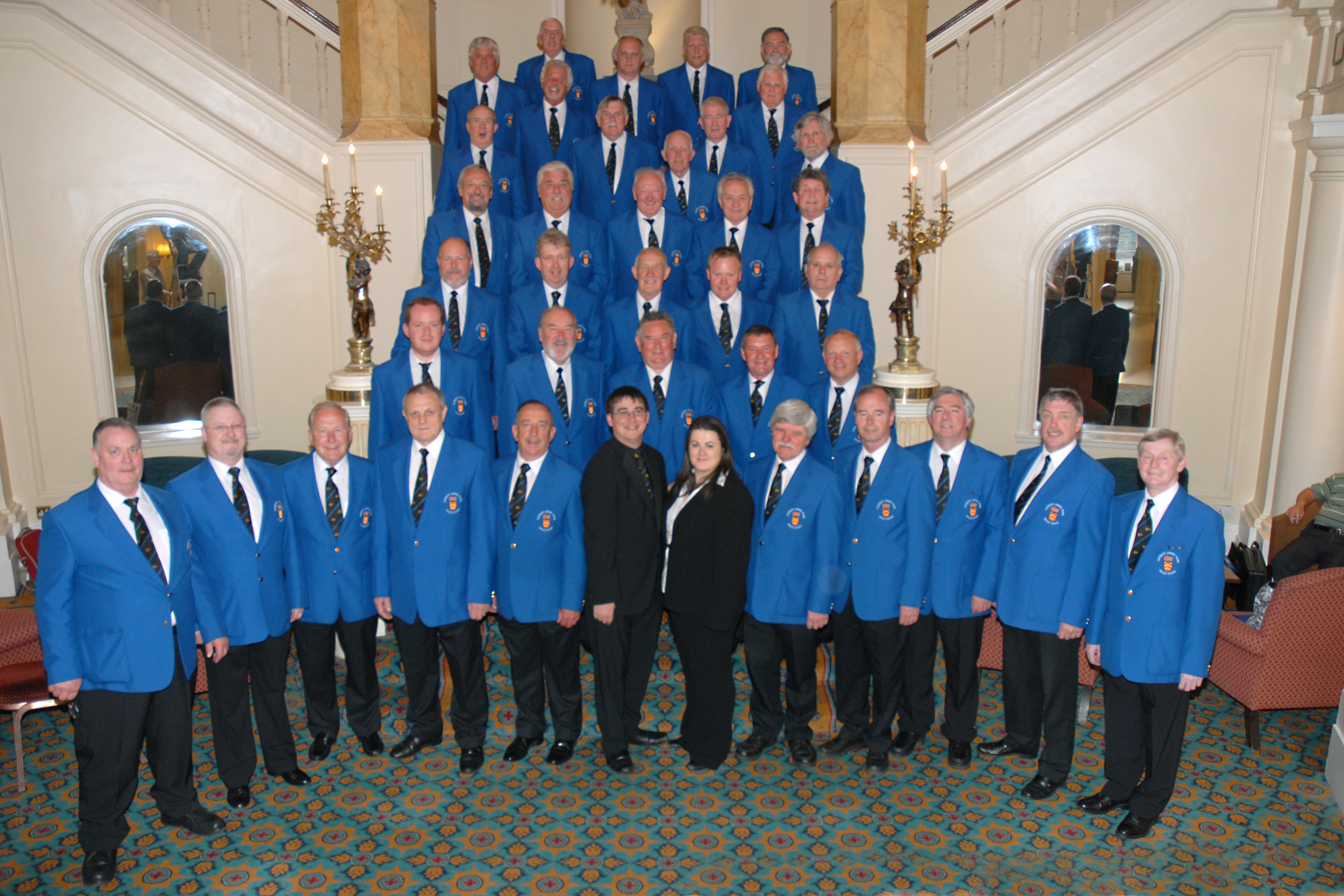
Cardiff Arms Park Male Choir

The National Stadium was known primarily as the venue for massed voices singing such hymns as "Cwm Rhondda", "Calon Lân", "Men of Harlech" and "Hen Wlad Fy Nhadau" ("Land of my Fathers" – the national anthem of Wales). The legendary atmosphere including singing of the crowd was said to be worth at least a try or a goal to the home nation. This tradition of singing has now passed on to the Millennium Stadium.

The Arms Park has its own choir, called the Cardiff Arms Park Male Choir. It was formed in 1966 as the Cardiff Athletic Club Male Voice Choir, and today performs internationally with a schedule of concerts and tours. In 2000, the choir changed their name to become the Cardiff Arms Park Male Choir.

== See also ==
- List of Commonwealth Games venues
- Sport in Cardiff

| Preceded by none | Heineken Cup final venue 1995–96; 1996–97 | Succeeded by Parc Lescure; Bordeaux |
