= Andy Maxwell =

Andy Maxwell may refer to:

- Andy Maxwell (rugby union, born 1951), England rugby union international
- Andy Maxwell (rugby union, born 1981), Irish rugby union player for Ulster and Edinburgh

== See also ==
- Andrew Maxwell, Irish comedian
