= Ian Orum =

English rugby footballer (1955–2020)

Personal information
- Born: 15 August 1955 Buckrose, Yorkshire, England
- Died: 24 June 2020 (aged 64)

Playing information

Rugby union
- Position: Scrum-half
Club
Years	Team	Pld	T	G	FG	P
1971	South Shields RFC
1973	Bridlington RUFC
1973–74	Hull & ER RUFC
1974–79	Roundhay RFC
	Total	0	0	0	0	0

Rugby league
- Position: Stand-off, Scrum-half
Club
Years	Team	Pld	T	G	FG	P
1979–86	Castleford	113	10	0	1	32

Ian Orum (15 August 1955 – 24 June 2020) was an English rugby union, and professional rugby league footballer who played in the 1970s and 1980s. He played representative level rugby union England (Under-23s), and at club level for South Shields RFC (formally South Shields Marine Technical College RUFC), Bridlington RUFC and Roundhay RFC, as a scrum-half, and club level rugby league for Castleford, as a stand-off or scrum-half.

== Background ==
Born in Buckrose, East Riding of Yorkshire, Orum was educated at Bridlington School, and later attended the College of Technology at South Shields.

== Playing career ==
=== Rugby union ===
After leaving school, Orum played rugby union for South Shields RFC, Bridlington RUFC and Hull & East Riding RUFC, before joining Roundhay RUFC in 1974. He formed an effective half back partnership at the club with England international fly-half Keith Smith, and helped the club win the 1975 Yorkshire Cup.

He was selected by England for their 1975 tour of Australia, but did not make any Test appearances. He was also an unused replacement for England in several games during the 1978 Five Nations Championship.

=== Rugby league ===
Orum switched to rugby league in November 1979, joining Castleford. He appeared as a substitute (replacing centre Gary Hyde) in Castleford's 2-13 defeat by Hull F.C. in the 1983 Yorkshire Cup Final during the 1983–84 season at Elland Road, Leeds, on Saturday 15 October 1983.
