= Neil Mantell =

England international rugby union player

- Full name: Neil Dennington Mantell
- Born: Reigate, Surrey, England

Rugby union career
- Position: Lock
International career
Years	Team	Apps	(Points)
1975	England	1	(0)

Neil Dennington Mantell is an English former rugby union international.

Mantell grew up in Surrey, attending Reigate Grammar School.

While playing with Rosslyn Park, Mantell earned a place on the England squad for the 1975 tour of Australia as one of many uncapped players. He was competing with Bob Wilkinson for the position of lock and got picked to start in the first Test at the Sydney Cricket Ground, which they lost by seven points. Wilkinson replaced him for the second Test.

Mantell moved to Nottingham R.F.C. in the 1980s and served as club captain. He was unable to add to his one England cap despite making it into England practice and trials sides during his time at Nottingham.

== See also ==
- List of England national rugby union players
