= 1971–72 RFU Knockout Cup =

English rugby cup

1971–72 RFU National KO Competition

Tournament statistics

The 1971–72 National KO Competition was the first rugby union cup competition (for clubs) in England. Gloucester won the competition defeating Moseley in the final. In the final the Moseley lock Nigel Horton floored Dick Smith (the Gloucester openside) with a punch during the second scrum of the game and was sent off by Ron Lewis the referee. Moseley ended the game with just twelve men after their two flankers, Tim Smith and Ian Pringle, were both carried off injured.

The RFU introduced this new challenge cup which quickly emerged as England's premier Rugby Union club competition event. The final was held at Twickenham Stadium. The principal event for Rugby Union club players at this time had been the County Championship because there was no official league table for clubs.

== Draw and results ==
=== First round ===
Team one	Team two	Score	Notes
Birkenhead Park	Wigton	13-9	
Coventry	Birmingham	11-4	
Wilmslow	Liverpool	14-6	
Halifax	Gosforth	9-6	
London Welsh	Oxford	30-6	
Moseley	Northampton	25-12	
Nottingham	Leicester	10-3	
Rugby	Bedford	12-17	
Saracens	London Irish	26-3	
Sidcup	Blackheath	3-30	
West Hartlepool	Headingley	17-10	
Wilmslow	Liverpool	14-6	

=== Second round ===
Team one	Team two	Score	Notes
Birkenhead Park	Wilmslow	0-6	
Exeter	Penryn	10-10*	(* away team progress)
Gloucester	Bristol	15-4	
Halifax	West Hartlepool	8-0	
Harlequins	Blackheath	12-4	
Moseley	Bedford	16-9	
Nottingham	Coventry	3-30	
Saracens	London Welsh	7-33	

=== Quarter-finals ===
Team one	Team two	Score	Notes
Harlequins	Wilmslow	7-16	
London Welsh	Gloucester	4-9	
Moseley	Halifax	22-0	
Penryn	Coventry	4-28	

=== Semi-finals ===
Team one	Team two	Score	Notes
Coventry	Gloucester	6-6*	(away team progress)
Moseley	Wilmslow	18-10	

=== Final ===
29 April 1972

Gloucester	17–6	Moseley
Try: John Dix; Roy Morris; Pen: Eric Stephens; Drop: Tom Palmer; Mickie Booth		Try: Malcolm Swain; Con: Sam Doble

Twickenham Stadium, London
Attendance: 10,500
Referee: Ron Lewis (Wales)

Gloucester
Moseley

15	Eric Stephens
14	Bob Clewes
13	Roy Morris
12	John Bayliss
11	John Dix
10	Tom Palmer
9	Mickie Booth
1	Robin Cowling
2	Mike Nicholls (c)
3	Mike Burton
4	Alan Brinn
5	Jim Jarrett
6	John Watkins
7	Mike Potter
8	Dick Smith

15	Sam Doble
14	Keith Hatter
13	Malcolm Swain
12	Colin McFadyean
11	Roy Kerr
10	John Finlan
9	Jan Webster (c)
1	J Griffiths
2	Don Lane
3	Chris Morrell
4	R Morris
5	Nigel Horton
6	Tim Smith
7	J White
8	Ian Pringle
