= 1986–87 Divisional Championship (rugby union) =

Rugby union competition in England

1986-87 Divisional Championship
- Countries: England
- Champions: North (3rd title)

The 1986–87 Divisional Championship was the fourth edition of the tournament launched by the Rugby Football Union to help prepare England players for test rugby and was contested across three weekends in December 1986.

The tournament was the second to be held after it was revived in a round robin format in 1985. The North Division won the tournament for the third time, winning all three of their games. Each of the other divisional teams won one game. The Rothmans Rugby Yearbook review of the tournament was critical, saying that it “it did not prove as successful as had been hoped, either from the point of view of producing players for England or as a high-quality competition in itself”.

== Results ==
6 Dec 1986

North	16-12	South and South-West

Blundellsands
Referee: R Parker (West Midlands)

6 Dec 1986

London	13–9	Midlands

Wasps RFC, Sudbury
Referee: Fred Howard (Liverpool)

13 Dec 1986

South and South-West	11-0	London

Recreation Ground, Bath
Referee: D W Matthews (Liverpool)

13 Dec 1986

North	22-16	Midlands

County Ground, Gosforth
Referee: Laurie Prideaux (Cornwall)

20 Dec 1986

London	6-34	North

Wasps RFC, Sudbury
Referee: I Bullerwell (East Midlands)

20 Dec 1986

Midlands	18-10	South and South-West

Welford Road, Leicester
Referee: Colin High (Manchester)
