= Divisional Championship =

Rugby union competition in England

- Sport: Rugby union
- Founded: 1977
- Folded: 1995
- Owner: Rugby Football Union
- No. of teams: 4
- Country: England
- Most titles: North (5)

The Divisional Championship was an annual rugby union competition in England that ran over two separate periods between the late 1970s to the mid 1990s, contested by representative teams from four geographical regions of England.

Originally launched at a time when there was no formalised league structure for club matches in England, the competition was devised to allow players to gain experience of representative rugby, and concentrate the country's strongest players into a single competitive tournament below international level, thereby providing a better basis for selecting a successful England team.

The first version of the championship began during the 1977/78 season, with a brief hiatus in the early 1980s, before it returned in a slightly altered format for the 1985/86 season. The championship ended for a second time during the 1995/96 season as the professional era of rugby union began. All matches were generally played in the December of each season, to prepare players ahead of the start of the Five Nations Championship in the new year.

== History ==
=== 1977–1980 ===
The president of the Rugby Football Union (RFU) during the 1976/77 season, former England scrum-half and captain Dickie Jeeps, organised a series of meetings with club and county administrators and persuaded them that a divisional championship involving the country's best players would present a high standard of play to assist selectors in choosing a successful international team.

The inaugural tournament took place a year later during the 1977/78 season. The country was divided into four representative areas, North, Midlands, London, and South & South-West, which had previously formed as teams to play mostly against international touring sides, and each division had a national selector acting as chairman of their respective selection committee.

In the championship's first final, held on 17 December 1977 at Twickenham, the North beat the Midlands 22-7, while earlier in the day London beat the South & South-West 22-15 in the play-off for third and fourth place. But the championship was short-lived, because in the following two seasons the tournament was cancelled owing to the demands of fixtures against touring teams and only revived again, briefly, for the 1980/81 season before the RFU decided to abolish the concept altogether and return to the traditional 'club, county, country' line of progression.

=== 1985–1995 ===
In the early 1980s, the RFU instructed its Playing Sub-Committee to produce a report called 'Proposed New Playing Structure to Improve Quality of Play at Representative Level'. It became better known as the Burgess Report after its lead creator, John Burgess, the former Lancashire, North and England coach, and (later) RFU president. The report identified the lack of serious competition as the cause of the England team's underachievement. One of its key recommendations was to re-introduce the concept of a Divisional Championship, but with each division playing each other in a round-robin system to decide the winner.

So, after a break of four seasons, the Divisional Championship returned in December of the 1985/86 season and was won for the first time by the Midlands, who claimed victories in all three of their matches.

In late 1995, chairman of the RFU's competitions committee, John Jeavons-Fellows, helped create an RFU report that called for the abolition of the Divisional Championship, and on 18 December 1995 the RFU formally announced the end of the tournament with divisional rugby to continue in the form of matches against international touring teams, as it had done prior to the championship's inauguration.

== Structure ==
The original structure of the competition that covered the 1977/78 and 1980/81 seasons had the four divisions first meet in semi-finals, then a final and a play-off for third and fourth place. During the first season of the competition in 1977, sub-divisional trial matches within the four divisions were also held, and preceded the semi-final stage. During its second inception, beginning in the 1985/86 season, the competition adopted a round-robin format where each divisional team played the other three over successive weekends in November/December, with the team achieving the best record named champion.

== Winners ==
=== 1977–1980 ===
Year	Winner	Runner-up	Third	Fourth
1977	North	Midlands	London	South & South-West
1978	Tournament not held because of the 1978 New Zealand tour			
1979	Tournament not held because of the 1979 New Zealand tour			
1980	North	Midlands	London	South & South-West

=== 1985–1995 ===
Year	Winner	Runner-up	Third	Fourth
1985	Midlands	London	North	South & South-West
1986	North	South & South-West	Midlands	London
1987	North	Midlands	South & South-West	London
1988	London	North	South & South-West	Midlands
1989	London	North	South & South-West	Midlands
1990	London	Midlands	South & South-West	North
1991	Midlands	North	London	South & South-West
1992	South & South-West	Midlands	London	North
1993	South & South-West	London	Midlands	North
1994	Midlands	London	North	South & South-West
1995	North	Midlands	South & South-West	London
