= 1980–81 Divisional Championship (rugby union) =

Rugby union competition in England

1980-81 Divisional Championship
- Countries: England
- Champions: North (2nd title)
- Runners-up: Midlands

The 1980–81 Divisional Championship was the second edition of the tournament launched by the RFU to help prepare England players for test rugby and was contested across two weekends in December 1980.

Following its commencement in 1977, the Divisional Championship had had a two-season break owing to the demands of fixtures against touring teams, but returned in 1980–81.

The season's final was held on 20 December 1980 in poor weather conditions at Twickenham, and the North retained the title they won in 1977 with a 6–0 win over the Midlands. Earlier in the day London beat the South & South-West 13–4 in the play-off for third and fourth place.

== Results ==
=== Semi-finals ===
13 Dec 1980

North	10-4	South & South-West

Birkenhead Park
Referee: J A G Trigg (London)

13 Dec 1980

Midlands	17–13	London

Northampton
Referee: M Morgan (Bristol)

=== 3rd/4th play-off ===
20 Dec 1980

London	13–4	South & South-West

Twickenham
Referee: C J High (Lancashire)

=== Final ===
20 Dec 1980

North	6-0	Midlands
Pens: Johnson; Patrick

Twickenham
Referee: Roger Quittenton (London)

FB	15	Brian Patrick (Gosforth)
RW	14	(England) John Carleton (Orrell)
OC	13	A J Wright (Sale)
IC	12	N McDowall (Gosforth)
LW	11	(England) Mike Slemen (Liverpool)
FH	10	A D Johnson (Gosforth)
SH	9	(England) Steve Smith (Sale)
N8	8	L Connor (Waterloo)
OF	7	P H Moss (Orrell)
BF	6	T Morris (Liverpool)
RL	5	Steve Bainbridge (Orrell)
LL	4	(England) Bill Beaumont (Fylde) (c)
TP	3	Jeff Bell (Gosforth)
HK	2	Andy Simpson (Sale)
LP	1	(England) Fran Cotton (Sale)
No Replacements
		flag denotes international
		(at time of match)

FB	15	(England) Peter Rossborough (Coventry)
RW	14	Steve Holdstock (Nottingham)
OC	13	(England) Paul Dodge (Leicester)
IC	12	(England) Clive Woodward (Leicester
LW	11	Tim Barnwell (Leicester)
FH	10	(England) Les Cusworth (Leicester)
SH	9	Steve Kenney (Leicester)
N8	8	Graham Robbins (Coventry)
OF	7	Toby Allchurch (Cambridge University)
BF	6	P Cook (Nottingham)
RL	5	R Field (Moseley)
LL	4	Vince Cannon (Northampton)
TP	3	(England) Gary Pearce (Northampton)
HK	2	(England) Peter Wheeler (Leicester) (c)
LP	1	K Astley (Moseley)
No Replacements
		flag denotes international
		(at time of match)

=== Report ===
The 1981–82 Rothmans Rugby Yearbook noted that the championship's final round of matches was ruined by weather variously described as 'vile' and 'unspeakable'. Only a small crowd braved the atrocious weather and witnessed players struggling to come to terms with the conditions. In a repeat of the tournament's previous final, the North once again beat the Midlands to retain the title they won at the inaugural staging of the competition in 1977–78.

The pitch was reported as "wet and muddy" and the difference between the teams identified as the North pack managing the conditions slightly better than their opponents under the guidance of England's Grand Slam captain Bill Beaumont. Penalty goals were kicked by North's Johnson and Patrick.
