= Peter Colston =

Peter Colston may refer to:

- Peter Colston (ornithologist) (born 1935), English ornithologist
- Peter Colston (rugby union) (died 2022), English rugby union player and coach
