= Alan Wordsworth =

England international rugby union player

- Full name: Alan John Wordsworth
- Born: 9 November 1953 (age 73) Thornton Heath, England

Rugby union career
- Position: Fly-half
International career
Years	Team	Apps	(Points)
1975	England	1	(0)

Alan John Wordsworth (born 9 November 1953) is an English former rugby union international.

Wordsworth, born in Thornton Heath, studied at Whitgift School and Cambridge University.

A fly-half, Wordsworth was capped once for England, while a member of the squad that toured Australia in 1975. On the bench for the first Test at the Sydney Cricket Ground, Wordsworth got his opportunity after only 13 minutes when fly-half Neil Bennett had to come off injured. He picked up an injury himself to rule him out of the second Test in Brisbane.

Wordsworth played for Cambridge University R.U.F.C. and Harlequins.

== See also ==
- List of England national rugby union players
