= Peter Butler (rugby union) =

England & Gloucester international rugby union player

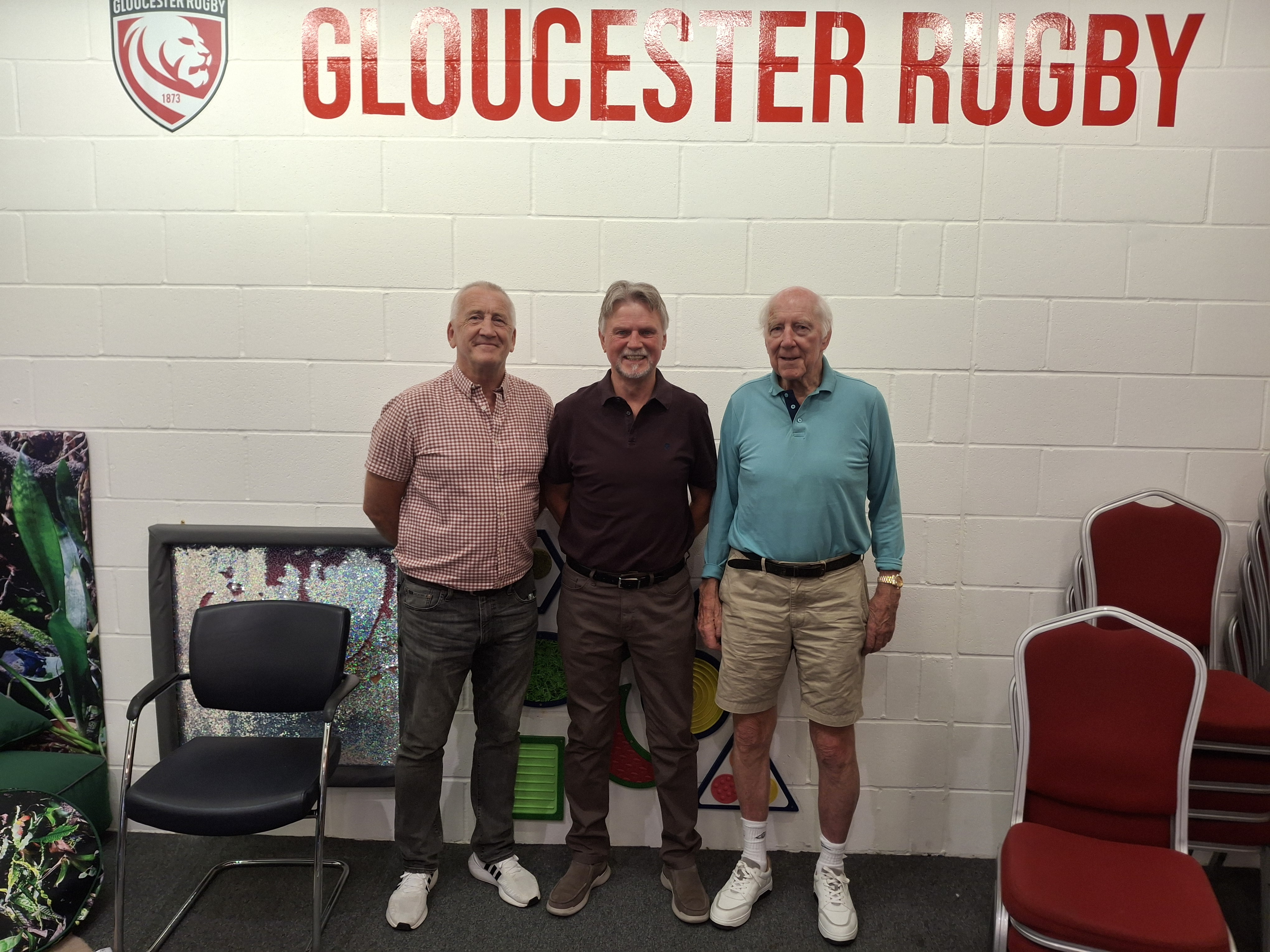
- Peter Butler (middle) at Kingsholm Stadium, June 2026.
- Born: Peter Edward Butler; 23 June 1951 (age 75) Alvin Street, Kingsholm, Gloucester, United Kingdom
- Height: 6 ft 0 in (183 cm)
- Weight: 12 st 2 lb (77 kg; 170 lb)
- School: The Crypt School
- University: Birmingham University

Rugby union career
- Position: Fullback
Senior career
Years	Team	Apps	(Points)
1972-1981	Gloucester		
International career
Years	Team	Apps	(Points)
1975-1982	England		

Peter Butler (born 23 June 1951 (age 75) in Gloucester) is a rugby union player who played as the position Fullback for England between 1975 and 1976, and 1981-1982, and Gloucester Rugby Club from 1972 to 1981. During his career at international level he won 2 England caps, scored 2 penalties, and 2 conversions (10 test points), and at a local level he scored 3006 points for Gloucester Rugby, making him the highest point scorer in the club.

== Early life ==
Butler was born on 23 June 1951. As a child Peter Butler attended Finlay Road Infants and Juniors School, and then the Crypt School where he was taught rugby. He then went to Birmingham University, where he eventually went on to captain the whole university team. At university, he also played for the Old Cryptians.

== Career ==
=== Pre-International Local Playing (1972-1975) ===
His first game for Gloucester was on 6 September 1972 against Moseley, where with four conversions and a penalty replaced the previous full-back, Eric Stephens. From 1973-1974, Butler scored 574 points. In the Divisional Championship of 1974-1975, Butler Played for the 'South' and 'South West' teams against 'Metropolitan' and 'South East'. He was selected to play in the England National Rugby Team during England's tour of Australia in 1975.

=== International Playing ===
==== 1975-1976 ====
Butler played in the England National Rugby Team during England's tour of Australia in 1975, winning him his first cap. He played in Brisbane on the 24th of May, scoring a conversion and a penalty. In the 1976 Five Nations Championship, he played against France in Paris, giving him his second cap. He scored a penalty and a conversion, however England still lost.

==== 1981-1982 ====
Peter Butler played his last games for England. He played in Rhodesia, South Africa, and Club of America. Against Club of America, he scored a drop goal.

=== Post-International Local Playing (1975-1981) ===
In 1975-1976, Butler played against Middlesex at Richmond, and scored all 24 of Gloucesters goals against Middlesex's 9. In Butler's last appearance for Gloucester, the club had been losing in a championship. It was against Northumberland, and although he scored all 6 of the club's points, it was a 6-15 defeat.

== Retirement ==
After retiring, Butler became a Columnist for Gloucestershire Live

== See also ==
- A page on the Gloucester Rugby Heritage site about Butler.
- An interview with Butler about his life and career.
