= 1985–86 Divisional Championship (rugby union) =

Rugby union competition in England

1985-86 Divisional Championship
- Countries: England
- Champions: Midlands (1st title)
- Runners-up: London

The 1985–86 Divisional Championship was the third edition of the tournament launched by the Rugby Football Union to help prepare England players for test rugby and was contested across three weekends in December 1985.

The competition was revived after a gap of five seasons with the hope that it would provide a better standard of high level competition than the County Championship and allow the England team selectors to see players in evenly matched teams.

The Midlands Division won the tournament for the first time, winning all three of their games. London was second with two wins, followed by the North with one win and the South and South-West who lost all three of their games.

== Results ==
7 Dec 1985

Midlands	28-15	North

Ireland Avenue, Beeston
Referee: J A G Trigg (London)

7 Dec 1985

London	22–3	South and South-West

Twickenham Stoop, London
Referee: Fred Howard (Liverpool)

14 Dec 1985

South and South-West	9-19	Midlands

Kingsholm, Gloucester
Referee: Colin High (Lancashire)

14 Dec 1985

North	3-7	London

Cross Green, Otley
Referee: Laurie Prideaux (North Midlands)

21 Dec 1985

Midlands	12-3	London

Franklin's Gardens, Northampton
Referee: S Trevithick (Cornwall)

21 Dec 1985

South and South-West	17-28	North

Memorial Stadium, Bristol
Referee: Roger Quittenton (London and Sussex)
