= Peter Kingston (rugby union) =

England international rugby union player

- Born: 24 July 1951 (age 75) Lydney, England

Rugby union career
- Position: Scrum-half
International career
Years	Team	Apps	(Points)
1975–79	England	5	(0)

Peter Kingston (born 24 July 1951) is an English former rugby union international.

Kingston was born in Lydney and began playing rugby union during his time at Lydney Grammar School.

A scrum-half, Kingston played briefly with Moseley after moving to Birmingham for a teaching job, but his opportunities there were limited by the presence of Jan Webster. He joined Gloucester in 1974 and soon earned his first England call up, for the 1975 tour of Australia, where he started in both Tests. The tour was a disappointment for England and Kingston was one of the players discarded, only to return for three matches in the 1979 Five Nations Championship.

Kingston continued to play with Gloucester into the mid-1980s and won two County Championship titles representing Gloucestershire. He had a stint with Welsh club Pontypool in 1984.

For 33 years, Kingston was a PE, history and sports teacher at Pate's Grammar School. He retired in 2009.

== See also ==
- List of England national rugby union players
