= Alan Brinn =

England international rugby union player (1940–2022)

- Born: 21 July 1940 Ystrad, Rhondda, Wales
- Died: 9 February 2022 (aged 81)

Rugby union career
- Position: Lock
Senior career
Years	Team	Apps	(Points)
1960–77	Gloucester	574	(164)
International career
Years	Team	Apps	(Points)
1972	England	3	(0)

Alan Brinn (21 July 1940 — 9 February 2022) was an English rugby union international.

Brinn was born in Ystrad, Wales and played his early rugby union with Hereford, before debuting for Gloucester in 1960, where he made a club record 574 appearances, mostly as a second-row forward. He played in Gloucester's 1971–72 RFU Knockout Cup title win and made six successive County Championship finals while representing Gloucestershire.

Playing as a lock, Brinn gained three caps for England in the 1972 Five Nations Championship.

Brinn later served as Gloucester chairman and was an associate national selector for England Rugby. He lived with wife Margaret in Gloucester for many years and ran a sport outfitting store in Eastgate Street, Gloucester.

== See also ==
- List of England national rugby union players
