= Eric Stephens (rugby union) =

English rugby union player

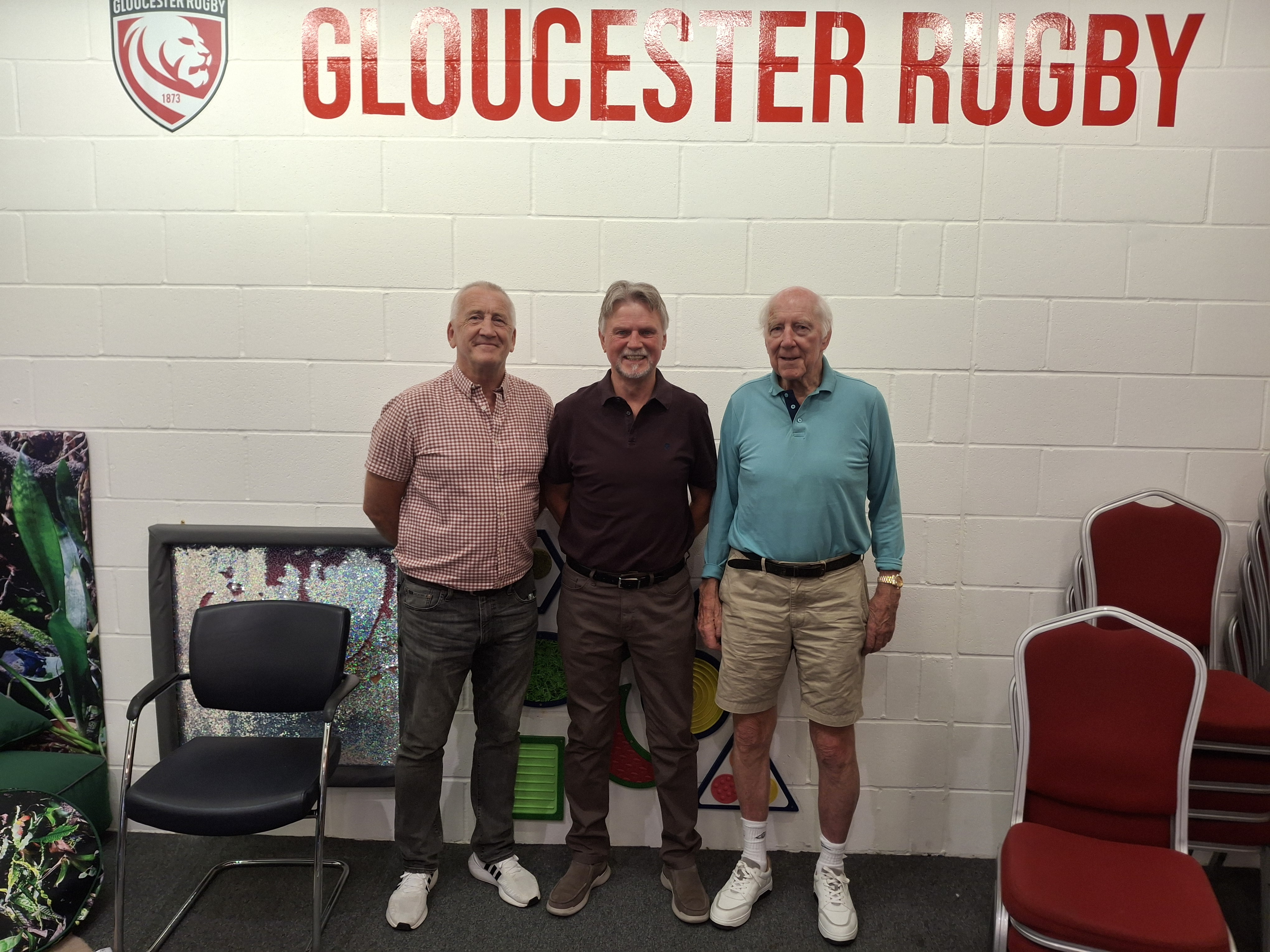
- Eric Stephens (right) with others at Kingsholm Stadium, June 2026.

Personal information
- Full name: Eric John Frank Stephens
- Nationality: English
- Citizenship: United Kingdom
- Born: August 1939 (age 87) Gloucester, Gloucestershire, England, United Kingdom
- Home town: Gloucester
- Education: The Crypt School
- Years active: 1961–1974
- Spouse: Patricia V. Marden (1968-present)
- Relative: Eric 'Jimmy' Stephens (father)

Sport
- Sport: Rugby union
- Position: Various, primarily fullback
- Club: Gloucester Rugby (1961–62) (1964-74), Saracens Rugby (1962–1963)
- Retired: 1974

Eric Stephens is a retired Gloucester rugby union player and Old Cryptian. He was born in August, 1939 in Gloucester and played for Gloucester Rugby Club between 1961–1974, a period of 13 years. In his career, he played a total of 221 games and scored 1559 points, placing him third on the all time top points scorers for Gloucester Rugby. He later served as president of the Old Cryptians Club from 2010–2011.

== Early life and education ==
Eric Stephens was born in August 1939 in a 'nursing home on Clarence Street', Gloucester. He was the only son of four children born to his parents, Eric James 'Jim' Stephens and Ivy Ethel Stephens. He had a primary education at the Calton Road Primary school and a secondary education at the Crypt Grammar School. Whilst at the Crypt School, he also played for the Old Cryptians rugby team.

== Career ==
Stephens made his debut to Gloucester Rugby in 1961, but went to London for work the next year and briefly played for the Saracens Club before returning to Gloucester. In 1968, he married Patricia V. Marden and had three children. In his last season, Stephens was appointed captain of Gloucester United. In 1974, he retired from rugby, playing 221 games throughout his career and Scoring 1559 points (Tries: 22, Conversions: 249, Penalties: 320, Drop Goals 10.) Alongside playing rugby, he also played in the local senior cricket club.

=== Pre–1966 ===
Stephens's rugby career started at his high-school, the Crypt School, and he also played for the Old Cryptians team. He joined Gloucester Rugby Club in 1961 and Played against Coventry with the position centre right. His first game at home was against Old Blues at Kingsholm in November 1961 where he scored two tries. He went to London from 1962–63 and temporarily played for the Saracens Club. He returned to Gloucester the following year, playing mostly for the second team until 1968, when he became the first choice full-back.

=== 1967–1971 ===
In 1967 Stephens played as full back, but in 1968 he played utility back along with outside half. His breakthrough came in 1968-1969 when his teammate retired and he became regular fullback. In 1969, Stephens played against Bath and scored a penalty and a conversion, which gave Gloucester enough points to win. In 1970 Stephens did not play in September but managed to play 46 games as outside half and then left wing with Ron Etheridge at full back. When Etheridge was injured, Stephens reverted to fullback. He made his county debut in the final at full back against Surrey at Kingsholm. Stephens scored 363 points that season.

=== 1971–1974 ===
In 1971–72 he scored 388 points from 44 games and retained his county place at full back for the group stages. He was replaced for the semi-final against Middlesex but played left wing in the final against Warwickshire at Coundon Road. He started the club season on the left wing but again reverted to full back when Ron Etheridge was injured and stayed there for the remainder of the season.

==== 1971–72 RFU Knockout Cup ====
Stephens played in the 1971–72 RFU Knockout Cup against, Bath, Bristol, London Welsh, Coventry, and Moseley. Playing against Bath, Stephens scored 2 Penalties in first period and 2 in the second period. playing against Bristol, Stephens got the first point by kicking a penalty. Stephens then made a conversion for a nine point interval lead, then scoring 2 more tries in the second half. Playing against London Welsh, Stephens scored a penalty kick and a conversion in the second half. Playing against Coventry, Stephens kicked a penalty before scoring a drop goal from around halfway. In the Final at Twickenham Stadium, playing against Moseley, Stephens missed a conversion in the first half but in the second half scored a penalty kick. Stephens played as fullback and scored 38 out of the 68 points Gloucester scored in their successful RFU Knockout Cup campaign.

In 1972–73 Peter Butler became first choice for full back for club and county. Stephens played as a utility back, positioned as full back in the absence of Peter Butler and Ron Etheridge. He also covered outside half and left wing when Etheridge played and a specialist kicker was required. He scored 170 points from only 19 games.

In his last season, Stephens became captain of Gloucester United. Ron Etheridge moved to left wing with Peter Butler at full back and Stephens as backup fullback if Butler was absent. He scored 75 points in 9 games. (Note: The information in the source is contradictory and most likely a typo. The text given is a best guess for the intended meaning.) Eric Stephens then retired in 1974.

== Retirement ==
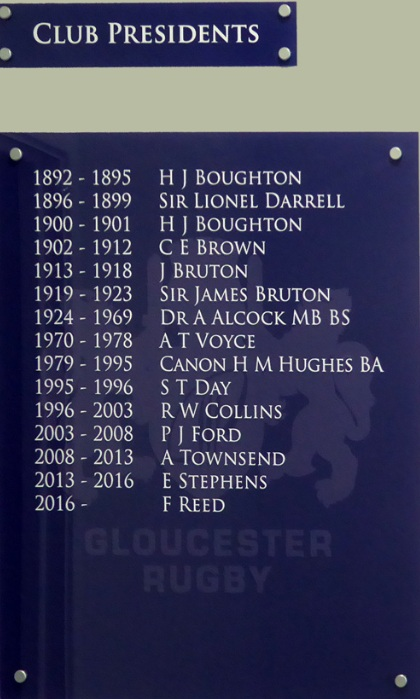
The Presidents Board at Kingsholm Stadium, featuring Eric Stephens, who served as Club President between 2013–2016.

After retiring, Stephens served in the Gloucester Rugby Club Committee in a variety of positions until 1996 when the game became professional, but retaining his position as player selector. In 2010, he became president of the Old Cryptians Club until 2011. Between 2013–2016 Stephens served as Club President of Gloucester Rugby.
