= David Caplan (rugby union) =

English rugby union player

- Full name: David William Nigel Caplan
- Born: 5 April 1954 (age 72) Leeds, Yorkshire, England

Rugby union career
- Position: Fullback
International career
Years	Team	Apps	(Points)
1978	England	2	(0)

David William Nigel Caplan (born 5 April 1954) is an English former rugby union international.

Caplan, a Leeds Grammar and Newcastle University product, played for Medicals, Headingley, Stamford and Northampton.

Capped twice by England, Caplan was fullback in their final two 1978 Five Nations matches, wins over Scotland at Murrayfield and Ireland at Twickenham, with his attacking game seen to add an extra dimension. He might have gone on to win more having made a "highly favourable initial impression" in his two appearances but for competition in his position from Alastair Hignell (14 caps) and Dusty Hare (25 caps).

Caplan is a dentist by profession.

== See also ==
- List of England national rugby union players
