= Eric Stephens (cricketer) =

English cricketer

Personal information
- Full name: Eric James Henry Stephens
- Born: 23 March 1909; Gloucester, England
- Died: 3 April 1983 (aged 74); Gloucester, England
- Batting: Left-handed
- Role: Batsman
- Relatives: Eric Stephens (son)

Domestic team information
- Years: Team
- 1927–1937: Gloucestershire

Career statistics
Competition	FC
Matches	216
Runs scored	4593
Batting average
100s/50s
Top score
Balls bowled
Wickets	29
Bowling average
5 wickets in innings
10 wickets in match
Best bowling
Catches/stumpings
- Source: Cricinfo, 4 August 2013

Eric 'Jimmy' Stephens (23 March 1909 – 3 April 1983) was an English cricketer. He played for Gloucestershire County Cricket Club between 1927 and 1937, and professional rugby.

== Early life ==
Stephens was born in Gloucester on 25 February 1909, the son of John James Stephens and Amy Stephens (née Wood). He was one of 6 children born to the couple and lived on Frampton Road, Gloucester.

== Career ==
=== Rugby (1926-1935) ===
Stephens represented Gloucester Rugby between 1926 and 1930, and played as a fly-half or centre. He played 53 first team games, scoring 27 points, and was capped twice by Gloucestershire. In 1929, he moved to Birmingham to play rugby professionally, then returning in 1935. After returning, he played instead for the Wagon Works Rugby Football Club.

=== Cricket (1927-1937) ===
Eric Stephens started his cricket career in 1927. On 8 May 1935, he played against Oxford University. In the Gloucester first innings, he scored 15 runs. In the Oxford first inning, he scored 18 runs and 2 overs. And in the Gloucester second inning, he scored 53 runs.

== Later life ==
On 25 August 1935, Stephens married Ivy Ethel Keys. Stephens played soccer with the Southern League soccer and, later, boules. He had four daughters and one son, Eric Stephens, in 1939. Stephens' wife, Ivy Ethel Keys, died in 1954, aged 47 years. Stephens died whilst living in Tuffley Avenue on 6 March 1983, aged 84 years.
