= Barry Nelmes =

England international rugby union player

- Full name: Barry George Nelmes
- Born: 17 April 1948 Bristol, England
- Died: 1 December 2006 (aged 58) Cardiff, Wales
- Height: 6 ft 2 in (188 cm)

Rugby union career
- Position: Prop
International career
Years	Team	Apps	(Points)
1975–78	England	6	(4)

Barry George Nelmes (17 April 1948 – 1 December 2006) was an English rugby union international.

== Biography ==
Born in Bristol, Nelmes attended Portway Secondary School and was playing first-class rugby for Bristol by age 16. He moved to Cardiff RFC in 1973–74 and two years later was called up by England for a tour of Australia, where he earned two caps as a prop. In 1978, he played in three Five Nations matches and one more Test later that year against the All Blacks at Twickenham. He became Cardiff captain in 1978–79 and went on to play 166 games for the club.

Nelmes continued to live in Cardiff after his rugby career ended. In 1993, he was sentenced to 15-month imprisonment for theft, having been found guilty of stealing £12,000 from a local social club of which he was a steward and doctoring the books to try and hide the crime. He died in Cardiff in 2006 at the age of 58.

== See also ==
- List of England national rugby union players
