= John Burgess (rugby union coach) =

English rugby union footballer & coach

- Born: John Burgess; 8 November 1924 Salford, England
- Died: 3 May 1997 (aged 72)
- University: Salford Technical College

Rugby union career
Senior career
Years	Team	Apps	(Points)
-	Old Salfordians Rugby Union team		
-	Broughton Park RUFC		
Coaching career
- Years: Team
- 1975: England
- 1968-1973: Lancashire rugby team

John Burgess (8 November 1924 – 3 May 1997) was an English rugby union player and coach.

== Early life and career ==
Burgess was born in Salford, England on 8 November 1924. He graduated from the Salford Technical College with a degree in electrical engineering.

Burgess coached the Lancashire rugby team between 1968 – 1973 and the England national rugby union team between 18 January 1975 – 31 May 1975.

Prior to his coaching career, Burgess played for the Old Salfordians Rugby Union team and the Broughton Park RUFC.

Burgess served as President of the Rugby Football Union between 1987 – 1988.

John Burgess England coaching record
Dates from – to	Tests	Won	Drawn	Lost	Win percentage
18 January 1975 – 31 May 1975	6	1	0	5	17

== Education ==
Burgess studied at Salford Technical College for a degree in electrical engineering.

Preceded by John Elders	English national rugby coach 1975	Succeeded by Peter Colston
