= Andy Maxwell (rugby union, born 1951) =

England international rugby union player

- Full name: Andrew William Maxwell
- Born: 3 March 1951 West Kirby, England
- Died: 19 January 2013 (aged 61)

Rugby union career
- Position: Centre
International career
Years	Team	Apps	(Points)
1975–78	England	7	(4)

Andrew William Maxwell (3 March 1951 - 19 January 2013) was an English rugby union international.

Born in West Kirby, Maxwell attended Calday Grange Grammar School and played for Merseyside club New Brighton.

Maxwell, who played as a centre, was capped in seven Test matches for England between 1975 and 1978. He debuted on the 1975 tour of Australia and played all matches in the 1976 Five Nations Championship. A knee injury that he suffered against France in Paris during the 1978 Five Nations proved to be career ending.

== See also ==
- List of England national rugby union players
