= Keith Smith (rugby) =

England dual-code rugby international footballer

- Born: Keith Smith; 19 November 1952 Leeds, England
- Died: 2 June 2006 (aged 53) St. Gemma's Hospice, Leeds, England
- Height: 6 ft 3 in (1.91 m)

Rugby union career
- Position: Inside and Outside Center
Amateur team(s)
Years	Team	Apps	(Points)
1972-76	Moortown & Roundhay		
- Correct as of 11 September 2006
International career
Years	Team	Apps	(Points)
1974-75	England	4	
- Correct as of 11 September 2006
- Rugby league career

Playing information
- Position: Centre, Stand-off
Club
Years	Team	Pld	T	G	FG	P
1977–79	Wakefield Trinity
Representative
Years	Team	Pld	T	G	FG	P
1979	England	1

Coaching information
Club
Years	Team	Gms	W	D	L	W%
	East Leeds ARLFC

Keith Smith (19 November 1952 – 2 June 2006) was an English dual-code international rugby footballer who played in the 1970s. He played representative rugby union (RU) as a centre, for England, England (Under-23s), Yorkshire, and Yorkshire (Colts), and at club level for Moortown RUFC and Roundhay RUFC, and he played representative rugby league (RL) as a centre for England, and at club level for Wakefield Trinity.

== Background ==
Keith Smith was born in Leeds, West Riding of Yorkshire, England, he became a postman, and coached junior rugby league at East Leeds A.R.L.F.C., he was diagnosed with cancer, he died aged 53 in St. Gemma's Hospice, Leeds, West Yorkshire, and his funeral took place at Lawnswood Crematorium, Leeds at 9.40am on Friday 9 June 2006.

== Playing career ==
=== Rugby union ===
Keith Smith first played rugby union with Moortown RUFC, and Yorkshire Colts rugby then advanced to Roundhay. It was from that side that he was selected to play for England.

His Roundhay début was against local rivals West Leeds Old Boys in 1972. The last of his eventual 85 games was played was against Gosforth in 1976 for the National Cup. He eventually played 14 times for Yorkshire.

His first English appearance was in a draw against France played at Parc des Princes in Paris on 2 March 1974. In this game his centre pairing was Coventry's Geoff Evans. Peter Squires and Alan Old also played alongside him, they were both from his Yorkshire club.

Smith then went on the play for England against Wales at Twickenham two weeks later and added two more caps against Wales in Cardiff in 1975 and then playing against Scotland at Twickenham the following game.

=== Rugby league ===
On Saturday 16 March 1979, Smith played at centre and scored a try in England’s 15–7 victory over Wales in the 1979 European Rugby League Championship match at Lowerhouse Lane, Widnes. On Saturday 5 May 1979, he played at centre in Wakefield Trinity’s 3–12 defeat by Widnes in the 1978–79 Challenge Cup Final during the at Wembley Stadium, London, in front of a crowd of a crowd of 94,218.
