= 1964–65 Rugby Union County Championship =

English rugby union competition

1964–65 County Championship
- Countries: England
- Champions: Warwickshire (8th title)
- Runners-up: Durham County

The 1964–65 Rugby Union County Championship was the 65th edition of England's premier rugby union club competition at the time.

Warwickshire continued their recent domination of the event after winning a fourth consecutive competition (and seventh time in eight years). They defeated Durham County in the final.

== Final ==
13 March 1965

Durham County	9–15	Warwickshire
Try: Cowell, Baker; Drop: Weston		Try: Hofton; Pen: Cole; Drop: Cole (2), Dalton

New Friarage, Hartlepool
Referee: Mike Titcomb (Gloucestershire)

J Lancaster	Darlington
G Hunter	Gateshead Fell
A Chapman	Rosslyn Park
John Dee	Hartlepool Rovers
J A W Baker	Hartlepool Rovers
Mike Weston (capt)	Durham City
S Ainsley	Hartlepool Rovers
W G Garside	Durham University
Stan Hodgson	Durham City
T Urwin	North Durham
Tony Peart	Hartlepool Rovers
K Baggs	West Hartlepool
P J N Knowles	Durham University
Charlie Hannaford	Durham University
T A Cowell	Durham University

A J Holt	Coventry
Rodney Webb	Coventry
D A Jenkins	Coventry
P J Frame	Coventry
J E Hofton	Coventry
Tim Dalton	Coventry
G H Cole	Coventry
Bert Godwin	Coventry
Phil Judd	Coventry
John Owen	Coventry
R J Knott	Coventry
Colin Payne	Harlequins
Stan Purdy	Rugby
C R Holmes	Coventry
Peter Robbins (capt)	Coventry

== See also ==
- English rugby union system
- Rugby union in England
