= 1962–63 Rugby Union County Championship =

English rugby union competition

1962–63 County Championship
- Countries: England
- Champions: Warwickshire (6th title)
- Runners-up: Yorkshire

The 1962–63 Rugby Union County Championship was the 63rd edition of England's premier rugby union club competition at the time.

Warwickshire won the competition for the sixth time (and fifth time in six years) after defeating Yorkshire in the final.

== Final ==
27 April 1963

Warwickshire	13–10	Yorkshire
Try: Frame; Con: Cole; Pen: Cole (2); Drop: Dalton		Try: Brash; Con: Bell; Pen: Bell (2)

Coundon Road, Coventry
Referee: M H R King (Surrey)

D R Cook	Coventry
Peter Jackson (capt)	Coventry
A B Davies	Coventry
P J Frame	Coventry
R Melville	Coventry
Tim Dalton	Coventry
G C Cole	Coventry
M R McLean	Coventry
Bert Godwin	Coventry
Phil Judd	Coventry
John Owen	Coventry
Tom Pargetter	Moseley
Stan Purdy	Rugby
J F Gardiner	Coventry
Peter Robbins	Coventry

D I Bell	Hull & East Riding
R A Bell	Halifax
J A Kaye	Wakefield
I M Gibson	Leicester
D Senior	Leicester
Phil Horrocks-Taylor	Leicester
P M Johnston	Headingley
R A Childs	Halifax
R P Baldwin	Harrogate
Frank Whitcombe	Bradford
Mike Campbell-Lamerton	Halifax
J Waind	Wakefield
C E Heighton (capt)	Sheffield
M J Bayes	Bradford
J C Brash	Middlesbrough

== See also ==
- English rugby union system
- Rugby union in England
