= 1982–83 Rugby Union County Championship =

English rugby union competition

1982–83 Thorn EMI County Championship
- Countries: England
- Champions: Gloucestershire (14th title)
- Runners-up: Yorkshire

The 1982–83 Thorn EMI Rugby Union County Championship was the 83rd edition of England's County Championship rugby union club competition.

Gloucestershire won their 14th title after defeating Yorkshire in the final.

A new format was introduced which consisted of the counties being organised into four divisions with relegation and promotion.

== Semi finals ==
Date	Team One	Team Two	Score
26 Nov	Gloucestershire	Surrey	19-16
26 Nov	Middlesex	Yorkshire	7-18

== Final ==
29 January 1983

Gloucestershire	19–7	Yorkshire
Try: Boyle, Morley, Cue, Harding; Pen: Sorrell		Try: Norton; Pen: Old

Memorial Ground, Bristol
Referee: Roger Quittenton (London)

15	Phil Cue	Bristol
14	John Carr	Bristol
13	Simon Hogg	Bristol
12	Ralph Knibbs	Bristol
11	Alan Morley	Bristol
10	Dave Sorrell	Bristol
9	Richard Harding	Bristol
1	Malcolm Preedy	Gloucester
2	Kevin Bogira	Bristol
3	Austin Sheppard	Bristol
4	Steve Boyle	Gloucester
5	John Fidler	Gloucester
6	John Gadd	Gloucester
7	Mike Rafter (capt)	Bristol
8	Bob Hesford	Bristol
Replacements:
16	C Price	Lydney
17	T Davis	Stroud
18	Nick Price	Gloucester
19	Kevin White	Gloucester
20	Gordon Sargent	Lydney
21	Nigel Pomphrey	Bristol

15	D Norton	Headingley
14	Mike Harrison	Wakefield
13	Bryan Barley	Wakefield
12	S Townend	Wakefield
11	Rory Underwood	Middlesbrough
10	Alan Old (capt)	Sheffield
9	Nigel Melville	Wakefield
1	Paul Huntsman	Headingley
2	P Lazenby	Morley
3	J Tinker	Harrogate
4	P Lockyer	Blackheath
5	R Walters	Huddersfield
6	P Buckton	Liverpool
7	Peter Winterbottom	Headingley
8	J Ellison	Headingley
Replacements:
16	P J Squires	Harrogate
17	H Jarzyna	Morley
18	A Mason	Roundhay
19	A Machell	Headingley
20	T C Sinclair	Headingley
21	S R Tipping	Roundhay

== See also ==
- English rugby union system
- Rugby union in England
