= 1961–62 Rugby Union County Championship =

English rugby union competition

1961–62 County Championship
- Countries: England
- Champions: Warwickshire (5th title)
- Runners-up: Hampshire

The 1961–62 Rugby Union County Championship was the 62nd edition of England's premier rugby union club competition at the time.

Warwickshire won the competition for the fifth time after defeating Hampshire in the final.

== Final ==
10 March 1962

Hampshire	6–11	Warwickshire
Try: unknown Pen: Morris (2)		Try: Gardiner; Con: Cole; Pen: Cole (2)

Twickenham
Referee: Dr N M Parkes

S A Morris	Newton Abbot
M H S Heath	United Services Portsmouth
C Gibson	United Services Portsmouth
David Rosser	Wasps
R Willis	Christchurch
J A T Rodd	London Scottish
S R Smith (capt)	Richmond
Norman Bruce	London Scottish
G P Thomas	United Services Portsmouth
M J G Stear	Winchester
R Brooke	Rosslyn Park
K P Andrews	Bath
G W Payne	London Welsh
D Willis	Wasps
W E Rothwell	United Services Portsmouth

D R Cook	Coventry
Peter Jackson (capt)	Coventry
Tim Dalton	Coventry
R J Frame	Coventry
M Neale	Coventry
A Davies	Coventry
G C Cole	Coventry
Phil Judd	Coventry
Bert Godwin	Coventry
M R McLean	Coventry
Tom Pargetter	Moseley
Colin Payne	Harlequins
Stan Purdy	Rugby
J F Gardiner	Coventry
Peter Robbins	Coventry

== See also ==
- English rugby union system
- Rugby union in England
