= 1963–64 Rugby Union County Championship =

English rugby union competition

1963–64 County Championship
- Countries: England
- Champions: Warwickshire (7th title)
- Runners-up: Lancashire

The 1963–64 Rugby Union County Championship was the 64th edition of England's premier rugby union club competition at the time.

Warwickshire won the competition for the seventh time (and sixth time in seven years) after defeating Lancashire in the final.

== Final ==
14 March 1964

| Warwickshire | 8–6 | Lancashire |
| Try: Jackson, another Con: Cole | | Try: Jarvis; Pen: Willcox |

Coundon Road, Coventry
Referee: A C Luff (Notts, Lincs & Derbyshire)

| A J Holt | Coventry |
| Peter Jackson (capt) | Coventry |
| A E Davies | Coventry |
| P J Frame | Coventry |
| R Melville | Coventry |
| Tim Dalton | Coventry |
| G C Cole | Coventry |
| M R McLean | Coventry |
| Bert Godwin | Coventry |
| Phil Judd | Coventry |
| John Owen | Coventry |
| Colin Payne | Harlequins |
| Stan Purdy | Rugby |
| P Hall | Coventry |
| Peter Robbins (capt) | Coventry |

| John Willcox | Harlequins |
| A Jarvis | Broughton Park |
| Malcolm Phillips | Fylde |
| C R Jennings | Waterloo |
| D A Webster | Richmond |
| Tom Brophy | Loughborough Coll & Liverpool |
| W French | St Helens |
| G E Stringer | Blackheath |
| W M Baxter | Fylde |
| G St J L Goddard | Manchester |
| Alan 'Ned' Ashcroft | Waterloo |
| R Jackson | Broughton Park |
| Keith Bearne | Liverpool |
| T Kirchen | Liverpool |
| John Burgess | Broughton Park |

== See also ==
- English rugby union system
- Rugby union in England
