= 1967–68 Rugby Union County Championship =

English rugby union competition

1967–68 County Championship
- Countries: England
- Champions: Middlesex (6th title)
- Runners-up: Warwickshire

The 1967–68 Rugby Union County Championship was the 68th edition of England's premier rugby union club competition at the time.

Middlesex won their sixth title after defeating Warwickshire in the final.

== Final ==
30 March 1968

Middlesex	9–6	Warwickshire
Try: Stoneman, Hinshelwood; Drop: James		Pen: Cole (2)

Twickenham
Referee: Air Commodore G C Lamb (R.A.F)

G W James	London Welsh
Sandy Hinshelwood	London Scottish
R Weaver	Saracens
T M Rutter	Harlequins
Charlie Hodgson	London Scottish
M J Alder	Saracens
V J Lewis	Rosslyn Park
B M Stoneman	Richmond
Steve Richards	Richmond
M T Short	Metropolitan Police
Ian Jones	London Welsh
Chris Ralston	Richmond
K I McIntyre	St Bartholomews's Hospital
George Sherriff	Saracens
C W Thorburn (capt)	Guy's Hospital

A J Holt	Coventry
J R Melville	Coventry
David Duckham	Coventry
Tim Dalton	Coventry
Rodney Webb	Coventry
A James	Coventry
George Cole	Coventry
Phil Judd (capt)	Coventry
Bert Godwin	Coventry
J M Broderick	Coventry
H Prosser	Coventry
John Owen	Coventry
Roger Creed	Coventry
T Cowell	Rugby
R E Jones	Coventry

== See also ==
- English rugby union system
- Rugby union in England
