= 1973–74 Rugby Union County Championship =

English rugby union competition

1973–74 County Championship
- Countries: England
- Champions: Gloucestershire (11th title)
- Runners-up: Lancashire

The 1973–74 Rugby Union County Championship was the 74th edition of England's County Championship rugby union club competition.

Gloucestershire won their 11th title after defeating Lancashire in the final.

== Semi finals ==
Team One	Team Two	Score
Eastern Counties	Lancashire	3-13
Warwickshire	Gloucestershire	15-27

== Final ==
23 March 1974

Lancashire	12–22	Gloucestershire
Try: Richards; Pen: Gullick (2); Drop: Ashton		Try: Morley (2); Con: Butler; Pen: Butler (4)

St Anthony's Road, Blundellsands

15	Dave Gullick	Orrell
14	Tony Richards	Fylde
13	P Phillips	Orrell
12	M A J Glover	West Park
11	C Wilding	Fylde
10	I McConnell	Fylde
9	Brian Ashton	Orrell
1	Frank Anderson	Orrell
2	Colin Fisher	Waterloo
3	Fran Cotton	Coventry
4	Richard Trickey	Sale
5	Mike Leadbetter	Broughton Park
6	Roger Creed	Sale
7	Tony Neary (capt)	Broughton Park
8	Des Seabrook	Orrell
Coach:
	John Burgess

15	Peter Butler	Gloucester
14	Bob Clewes	Gloucester
13	Richard Jardine	Gloucester
12	John Bayliss	Gloucester
11	Alan Morley	Bristol
10	Bob Redwood	Gloucester
9	Richard Harding	Bristol & Cambridge Univ
1	Robin Cowling	Gloucester
2	John Pullin (capt)	Bristol
3	Mike Burton	Gloucester
4	Alan Brinn	Gloucester
5	John Fidler	Gloucester
6	John Watkins	Gloucester
7	John Haines	Gloucester
8	Charlie Hannaford	Bristol

== See also ==
- English rugby union system
- Rugby union in England
