= 1972–73 Rugby Union County Championship =

English rugby union competition

1972–73 County Championship
- Countries: England
- Champions: Lancashire (9th title)
- Runners-up: Gloucestershire

The 1972–73 Rugby Union County Championship was the 73rd season of England's County Championship club rugby union competition.

Lancashire won their ninth title after defeating Gloucestershire in the final.

== Semi-finals ==
Team 1	Team 2	Score
Gloucestershire	Eastern Counties	7–6
Lancashire	North Midlands	9–9, 22–7

== Final ==
24 March 1973

Gloucestershire	12–17	Lancashire
Try: Rollitt; Con: Butler; Pen: Butler (2)		Try: Briers (2), Richards; Con: O'Driscoll; Pen: McDonald

Memorial Ground, Bristol
Referee: R F Johnson (Kent)

15	Peter Butler (Gloucester)
14	Alan Morley (Bristol)
13	Pete Johnson (Clifton)
12	Richard Jardine (Gloucester)
11	Peter Knight (Bristol)
10	Bob Redwood (Gloucester)
9	John Cannon (Clifton)
1	Robin Cowling (Gloucester)
2	John Pullin (c; Bristol)
3	Budge Rogers (Bristol)
4	Alan Brinn (Gloucester)
5	John Fidler (Gloucester)
6	John Watkins (Gloucester)
7	Charlie Hannaford (Bristol)
8	Dave Rollitt (Bristol)

15	Barry O'Driscoll (Manchester)
14	Tony Richards (Fylde)
13	M. A. J. Glover (West Park)
12	Eric Lyon (Orrell)
11	Rob Briers (West Park)
10	I. McConnell (Fylde)
9	Brian Ashton (Fylde)
1	Frank Anderson (Orrell)
2	Colin Fisher (Waterloo)
3	Fran Cotton (Loughborough College)
4	Richard Trickey (Sale)
5	Mike Leadbetter (Broughton Park)
6	Peter Bayman (Orrell)
7	Tony Neary (Broughton Park)
8	Des Seabrook (c; Orrell)
