= 1958–59 Rugby Union County Championship =

English rugby union competition

1958–59 County Championship
- Countries: England
- Champions: Warwickshire (3rd title)
- Runners-up: Gloucestershire

The 1958–59 Rugby Union County Championship was the 59th edition of England's premier rugby union club competition at the time.

Warwickshire won the competition for the third time after defeating Gloucestershire in the final.

== Final ==
11 April 1959

Gloucestershire	9–14	Warwickshire
Try: Watts; Pen: Cripps (2)		Try: Melville (2), another Con: Cole; Pen: Cole

Memorial Stadium, Bristol
Referee: D M Parkes (Kent Society)

I W Sheen	Gloucester
M G Ellery	Bristol
L D Watts	Bristol
J Radford	Bristol
T W Jones	Bristol
A Holder	Gloucester
M Booth	Gloucester
George Hastings	Gloucester
John Thorne	Bristol
R Fowke	Stroud
B J Green	Bristol
D W Neale	Bristol
T E Base	Bristol
Gordon Cripps (capt)	Bristol
R A M Whyte	Harlequins

D R Cook	Coventry
Peter Jackson	Coventry
G P D Morris	Coventry
J A Pargetter	Moseley
R Melville	Coventry
C A Hewitt	Cardiff
George Cole	Coventry
Phil Judd (capt)	Coventry
Bert Godwin	Coventry
M R McLean	Coventry
John Price	Coventry
P Judd	Moseley
Stan Purdy	Rugby
J F Gardiner	Coventry
R F Batsone	Coventry

== See also ==
- English rugby union system
- Rugby union in England
