= 1986–87 Rugby Union County Championship =

English rugby union competition

1986–87 Thorn EMI County Championship
- Countries: England
- Champions: Yorkshire (11th title)
- Runners-up: Middlesex

The 1986–87 Thorn EMI Rugby Union County Championship was the 87th edition of England's County Championship rugby union club competition.

Yorkshire won their 11th title after defeating Middlesex in the final.

== Semi finals ==
Date	Venue	Team One	Team Two	Score
March 14	Moseley	North Midlands	Yorkshire	0-24
March 14	The Stoop	Middlesex	Cornwall	20-18

== Final ==
11 April 1987

Yorkshire	22–11	Middlesex
Try: Underwood (2), Buckton; Con: Adamson (2); Pen: Adamson (2)		Try: Moss, Pinnegar; Pen: Fletcher

Twickenham
Attendance: 10,000
Referee: Colin High (Manchester)

15	R Adamson	Wakefield
14	Mike Harrison (capt)	Wakefield
13	John Bentley	Otley
12	John Buckton	Saracens
11	Rory Underwood	Leicester
10	Rob Andrew	Wasps
9	David Holmes	Sheffield
1	Martin Whitcombe	Bedford
2	P Sellar	Hull and East Riding
3	A Rice	Hull and East Riding
4	G Thompson	Roundhay
5	D Baldwin	Wakefield
6	S Tipping	Sale
7	Peter Winterbottom	Headingley
8	Peter Buckton	Orrell

15	Huw Davies	Wasps
14	Simon Smith	Wasps
13	Rob Lozowski	Wasps
12	C R J Smith	Harlequins
11	A A Dent	Harlequins
10	D M Fletcher	Harlequins
9	J C Cullen	Richmond
1	Paul Curtis	Harlequins
2	John Olver	Harlequins
3	J Thorne	Richmond
4	Chris Pinnegar	Wasps
5	J R Howe	Saracens
6	Mark Rigby	Wasps
7	Ken Moss	Wasps
8	Paul Jackson (capt)	Harlequins
Replacements:
	Floyd Steadman	Saracens (for Cullen)
Coach:
	Dick Best

== See also ==
- English rugby union system
- Rugby union in England
