= 1953–54 Rugby Union County Championship =

English rugby union competition

1953–54 County Championship
- Countries: England
- Champions: Middlesex (3rd title)
- Runners-up: Lancashire

The 1953–54 Rugby Union County Championship was the 54th edition of England's premier rugby union club competition at the time.

Middlesex won the competition for the third time after defeating Lancashire in the final. Higgins was carried off on a stretcher early in the game which contributed to the heavy loss suffered by Lancashire.

== Final ==
3 April 1954

Lancashire	6–24	Middlesex
Pen: Griffiths (2)		Try: Roberts, Elgie, Baker, Syrett, Woodward; Con: Elgie (3); Pen: Elgie

St Anthony's Road, Blundellsands
Attendance: 12,000
Referee: R J Dean (Warwickshire)

Harry Scott	Manchester
K Smith	Preston Grasshoppers
F G Griffiths	Sale
Pat Quinn	New Brighton
Reg Bazley	Waterloo & Army
Martin Regan	Liverpool
Gordon Rimmer (capt)	Waterloo
A Higgins	Army & Liverpool
T Barker	Sale
M W Jameson	Waterloo
G G Twist	St Helens
Alan Ashcroft	St Helens
J Surrey	Waterloo
N Slack	Waterloo
D Chapman	Broughton Park

G H Sullivan	London Welsh
Ted Woodward	Wasps
P Delight	Old Blues & Loughborough Coll
M Elgie	London Scottish
Jim Roberts	Old Millhillians
Doug Baker	Old Merchant Taylors'
Johnny Williams	Old Millhillians
Ron Syrett	Wasps
Jim Ritchie	London Irish
Dyson Wilson (capt)	Metropolitan Police
Robin Thompson	Instonians & London Irish
Peter Yarranton	Wasps & R.A.F
John H Smith	London Irish
Nick Labuschagne	Guy's Hospital
D H Murphy	St Mary's Hospital

== See also ==
- English rugby union system
- Rugby union in England
