= 1969–70 Rugby Union County Championship =

English rugby union competition

1969–70 County Championship
- Countries: England
- Champions: Staffordshire (1st title)
- Runners-up: Gloucestershire

The 1969–70 Rugby Union County Championship was the 70th edition of England's premier rugby union club competition at the time.

Staffordshire won their first title after defeating Gloucestershire in the final.

== Semi finals ==
| Date | Venue | Team One | Team Two | Score |
|---|---|---|---|---|
| 7 Feb | Kingsholm | Gloucestershire | Lancashire | 9-6 |
| 7 Feb | Peel Croft | Staffordshire | Eastern Counties | 15-9 |

== Final ==
14 March 1970

| Staffordshire | 11–9 | Gloucestershire |
| Try: Hatter, Robinson; Con: Doble; Pen: Doble | | Try: Hannaford, Collins; Pen: Peters |

Peel Croft, Burton-on-Trent
Referee: R F Johnson (Kent)

| 15 | Sam Doble | Moseley |
| 14 | Keith Hatter | Moseley |
| 13 | T Ringer | Walsall |
| 12 | R H Downend | Sale |
| 11 | D Edwards | Sale |
| 10 | Colin McFadyean | Moseley |
| 9 | Jan Webster | Moseley |
| 1 | S G Walker | Moseley |
| 2 | Don Lane | Moseley |
| 3 | D I Buttery | Birkenhead Park |
| 4 | Mike Davis (capt) | Harlequins |
| 5 | S A Taylor | Moseley |
| 6 | E T Robinson | Manchester |
| 7 | A Copeland | Stoke |
| 8 | L J Rollinson | Coventry |

| 15 | Peter Knight | St Lukes College |
| 14 | J I Berry | Cheltenham |
| 13 | John Bayliss | Gloucester |
| 12 | R E White | Cheltenham |
| 11 | Mike Collins | Bristol |
| 10 | J T Hopson | Gloucester |
| 9 | John Morris | Lydney |
| 1 | Budge Rogers | Bristol |
| 2 | John Pullin | Bristol |
| 3 | Beverley Dovey | Bristol |
| 4 | Alan Brinn | Gloucester |
| 5 | Jim Jarrett | Gloucester |
| 6 | Charlie Hannaford | Rosslyn Park |
| 7 | Dick Smith | Gloucester |
| 8 | Dave Rollitt (capt) | Bristol |

== See also ==
- English rugby union system
- Rugby union in England
