= 1954–55 Rugby Union County Championship =

English rugby union competition

1954–55 County Championship
- Countries: England
- Champions: Lancashire (7th title)
- Runners-up: Middlesex

The 1954–55 Rugby Union County Championship was the 55th edition of England's premier rugby union club competition at the time.

Lancashire won the competition for the sixth time after defeating Middlesex in the final.

== Final ==
2 April 1955

Middlesex	8–14	Lancashire
Try: Wilson; Con: Davies; Drop: Regan		Try: Bazley, Pearson; Con: Smith; Pen: Smith (2)

Twickenham
Referee: R E Hook (Devon)

D M Davies	St Mary's Hospital
Ted Woodward	Wasps
P C Delight	Old Blues
J G Palmer	Rosslyn Park
Jim Roberts	Old Millhillians
Doug Baker	Old Merchant Taylors'
Johnny Williams	Old Millhillians
Dyson Wilson (capt)	Metropolitan Police
Jim Ritchie	London Irish
Ron Syrett	Wasps
Victor Harding	Saracens
Peter Yarranton	Wasps & R.A.F
John H Smith	London Irish
Nick Labuschagne	Guy's Hospital
J F Herbert	Wasps

Harry Scott	Manchester
K R Smith	Preston Grasshoppers
Ron Greenhall	Broughton Park
Pat Quinn	New Brighton
Reg Bazley	Waterloo
Martin Regan	Liverpool
T C Pearson	Sale
John Burgess	Broughton Park
Alan Ashcroft	St Helens
A Higgins	Liverpool
G G Twist	St Helens
H J Foster	Waterloo
J Sutton	Waterloo
Eric Evans (capt)	Sale
D Chapman	Broughton Park

== See also ==
- English rugby union system
- Rugby union in England
