= 1984–85 Rugby Union County Championship =

English rugby union competition

1984–85 Thorn EMI County Championship
- Countries: England
- Champions: Middlesex (8th title)
- Runners-up: Notts, Lincs & Derby

The 1984–85 Thorn EMI Rugby Union County Championship was the 85th edition of England's County Championship rugby union club competition.

Middlesex won their 8th title after defeating Notts, Lincs & Derby in the final.

== First Round ==
Pos	First Division Group 1	P	W	D	L	F	A	Pts
1	Middlesex	3	3	0	0	42	27	6
2	Notts, Lincs & Derby	3	2	0	1	48	31	4
3	Northumberland	3	1	0	2	37	46	2
4	Surrey	3	0	0	3	33	56	0

Pos	First Division Group 2	P	W	D	L	F	A	Pts
1	Gloucestershire	3	2	1	0	52	35	5
2	Yorkshire	3	2	0	1	50	42	4
3	Somerset	3	1	1	1	43	34	3
4	Kent	3	0	0	3	22	56	0

== Semi finals ==
Team One	Team Two	Score
Middlesex	Yorkshire	6–3
Notts, Lincs & Derby	Gloucestershire	14–9

== Final ==
13 April 1985

Middlesex	12–9	Notts, Lincs & Derby
Try: Weekes; Con: Stringer; Pen: Stringer; Drop: Davies		Pen: Hodgkinson (3)

Twickenham
Referee: Laurie Prideaux (North Midlands)

Nick Stringer	Wasps
Simon Smith	Wasps
Richard Cardus	Wasps
A L Thompson	Harlequins
M A Williams	Wasps
Huw Davies	Wasps
Ian George	London Welsh
P S Curtis	Harlequins
John Olver	Harlequins
Martin Hobley	Wasps
K R Moss	Wasps
Chris Pinnegar	Wasps
Andy Ripley	Rosslyn Park
David Cooke (capt)	Harlequins
Everton Weekes	Harlequins

M E Crane	Nottingham
Steve Holdstock	Nottingham
Clifton Jones	Nottingham
Gary Hartley	Nottingham
David Holdstock	Nottingham
Simon Hodgkinson	Nottingham
K J Murphy	Nottingham
John Ward	Nottingham
Brian Moore	Nottingham
Micky Grindle	Nottingham
Peter Cook	Nottingham
Chris Gray	Nottingham
Neil Mantell (capt)	Nottingham
Gary Rees	Nottingham
Steve Hughes	Nottingham

== See also ==
- English rugby union system
- Rugby union in England
