= 2011–12 Rugby Union County Championship =

English rugby union competition

2011–2012 Bill Beaumont Cup County Championship
- Countries: England
- Champions: Hertfordshire (1st title)
- Runners-up: Lancashire

The 2011–12 Bill Beaumont Cup (Rugby Union County Championship) was the 112th edition of England's County Championship rugby union club competition.

Hertfordshire won their first title after defeating Lancashire in the final.

== Final ==
26 May 2012

Hertfordshire	38–20	Lancashire
Try: May (2), Newton, Sherriff; Con: Coleman (3); Pen: Coleman (4)		Try: Spragg, S Briers; Con: Johnson (2); Pen: Johnson (2)

Twickenham

Tom Newton	Tring
Chris May	Old Albanian
Ben Ransom	Bedford Blues
Chris Lombaard	Old Albanian
Michael Allen	Hertford
James Shanahan	Old Albanian
Stefan Liebenberg	Bedford Blues
Jared Saunders	Saracens
Brett MacNamee (capt)	Hertford
Petrus Du Plessis	Saracens
Tom Jubb	Cambridge
Eoin Sheriff	Saracens
Oliver Cooper-Millar	Old Albanian
Rob Farenheim	Old Albanian
Billy Johnson	Bedford Blues
Replacements:
Stuart Bailey	Old Albanian
Robert Schillaci	Hertford
Marco Cecere	Old Albanian
Craig South	Hertford
Tom Mowbray	Chinnor
Tom Coleman	Bishop's Stortford
Richard Gregg	Old Albanian

Chris Briers	Fylde
Nick Royle	Fylde
Stephen Briers	Fylde
Richard Kenyon	Fylde
Warren Spragg	Petrarca Padova
Chris Johnson	Huddersfield
Ryan De la Harpe	Moseley
Dan Birchall	Sedgley Park
Alex Loney (capt)	Fylde
Peter Altham	Fylde
Paul Arnold	Fylde
Gareth Rawlings	Fylde
Sam Beaumont	Fylde
Evan Stewart	Fylde
Dominic Moon	Preston Grasshoppers
Replacements:
Simon Griffiths	Fylde
Grant Ferguson	Fylde
Mark Rylance	Caldy
Ben Vernon	Tarleton
Oliver Brennand	Fylde
Matthew Riley	Sedgley Park
Callum McShane	Fylde

== See also ==
- English rugby union system
- Rugby union in England
