= 1891–92 Rugby Union County Championship =

Fourth occurrence of the County Championship

1891–92 County Championship
- Countries: England
- Champions: Yorkshire (3rd title)

The 1891–92 Rugby Union County Championship was the fourth edition of England's premier rugby union club competition at the time.

Yorkshire won the competition for the third time, defeating all three of their opponents in the Championship Series.

== Draw and Results ==
=== Group Winners ===
Division	Winners
South Western	Kent
South Eastern	Midland Counties
North Western	Lancashire
North Eastern	Yorkshire

=== Championship Series ===
Date	Venue	Team One	Team Two	Score
28 Nov	Fartown Ground, Huddersfield	Yorkshire	Lancashire	3-0
1 Feb	Clarence Street, York	Yorkshire	Kent	21-3
11 Jan	Blackheath	Kent	Lancashire	
		Kent	Midland Counties	
10 Feb	The Reddings, Moseley	Midland Counties	Yorkshire	0-8
13 Feb	Whalley Range, Manchester	Lancashire	Midland Counties	4-0

Squad

- J Bedford (Wakefield Trinity)
- Tom Broadley (Bingley)
- Harry Bradshaw (Bramley)
- Arthur Briggs (Bradford)
- William Bromet (capt) (Tadcaster)
- E Dewhirst (Bradford)
- E Dickenson (Huddersfield)
- Jack Dyson (Huddersfield)
- Charles Emmott (Bradford)
- O Fletcher (Halifax)
- Albert Goldthorpe (Hunslet)
- Walter Goldthorpe (Hunslet)
- E Hudson (Leeds)
- Donald Jowett (Heckmondwike)
- Richard Lockwood (Heckmondwike)
- William Nicholl (Brighouse Rangers)
- C J F Paisley (Huddersfield)
- Jack Rathmell (Hunslet)
- J Redman (Manningham)
- T Summersgill (Leeds)
- John Toothill (Bradford)
- R Wood (Brighouse Rangers)

== See also ==
- English rugby union system
- Rugby union in England
