= 1977–78 Rugby Union County Championship =

English rugby union competition

1977–78 County Championship
- Countries: England
- Champions: North Midlands (1st title)
- Runners-up: Gloucestershire

The 1977–78 Rugby Union County Championship was the 78th edition of England's County Championship rugby union club competition.

North Midlands won their first ever title after defeating Gloucestershire in the final.

== Second Round ==
Team One		Team Two
Kent	bt	Middlesex

== Semi finals ==
Date	Venue	Team One	Team Two	Score
26 Nov	The Reddings	North Midlands	Yorkshire	14-10
26 Nov	Rectory Field, Blackheath	Kent	Gloucestershire	9-19

== Final ==
31 December 1977

North Midlands	10–7	Gloucestershire
Try: Nutt; Pen: Meanwell		Try: Mills; Pen: Butler

The Reddings, Moseley
Referee: Roger Quittenton (Sussex)

C Meanmwell	Moseley
M Hall	Dixonians
Barrie Corless	Moseley
Malcolm Swain	Moseley
P Mumford	Birmingham
Les Cusworth	Moseley
P Bullock	Birmingham
Trevor Corless	Moseley
Gary Cox	Moseley
B Greaves	Moseley
Barry Ayre	Moseley
N Bakewell	Coventry
J White	Moseley
Derek Nutt	Moseley
David Warren (capt)	Moseley

Peter Butler	Gloucester
Bob Clewes	Gloucester
Pete Johnson	Clifton
Chris G Williams	Gloucester
Michael Ward	Bristol
Ian Wilkins	Pontypool
Paul Howell	Gloucester
Austin Sheppard	Bristol
Steve Mills	Gloucester
Mike Burton	Gloucester
John Fidler	Gloucester
Steve Boyle	Gloucester
Mike Rafter (capt)	Bristol
Nigel Pomphrey	Bristol
John Haines	Gloucester

== See also ==
- English rugby union system
- Rugby union in England
