= 1993–94 Rugby Union County Championship =

English rugby union competition

1993–94 CIS Insurance County Championship
- Countries: England
- Champions: Yorkshire (12th title)
- Runners-up: Durham

The 1993–94 CIS Insurance Rugby Union County Championship was the 94th edition of England's County Championship rugby union club competition.

Yorkshire won their 12th title after defeating Durham in the final.

== Final ==
16 April 1994

Yorkshire	26–3	Durham
Try: Carroll, Harrison; Con: Plant (2); Pen: Plant (4)		Pen: Parker

Twickenham
Attendance: 16,000
Referee: Tony Spreadbury (Somerset)

David Breakwell	Leeds
Mike Harrison	Wakefield
Bryan Barley (capt)	Sandal
Steve Burnhill	Cleckheaton
Chris Thornton	Leeds
Kevin Plant	Rotherham
Guy Easterby	Harrogate
R Szabo	Wakefield
R Whyley	Harrogate
S McMain	Sheffield
C West	Rotherham
Ian Carroll	Otley
Christian Raducanu	Bradford & Bingley
N Hargreaves	Leeds
Charles Vyvyan	Wharfedale

G Spearman	Blaydon
O Evans	West Hartlepool
Piers Nickalls	Rosslyn Park
I Bell	Hartlepool Rovers
C Mattison	Durham City
Ashley Parker	West Hartlepool
Steve Kirkup	Durham City
R Nasibitt (capt)	Stockton
Ian Parnaby	Westoe
Maurice Douthwaite	Stockton
Simon Musgrove	Westoe
G Wanless	Durham City
C Aldus	Stockton
Darren McKinnon	West Hartlepool
B Dixon	Stockton
Replacements:
K McCallum	Durham City (for Evans)
J Brown	Novocastrians (for Spearman)

`

== See also ==
- English rugby union system
- Rugby union in England
