= 1990–91 Rugby Union County Championship =

English rugby union competition

1990–91 ADT County Championship
- Countries: England
- Champions: Cornwall (2nd title)
- Runners-up: Yorkshire

The 1990–91 ADT Security Systems Rugby Union County Championship was the 91st edition of England's County Championship rugby union club competition.

Cornwall won their second title (but first since 1908) after defeating Yorkshire in the final. The significant Cornwall following resulted in a new record attendance of 56,000 at Twickenham Stadium. The final signified the greatest match in the history of the competition.

== Final ==
20 April 1991

Cornwall	29–20 (a.e.t.)	Yorkshire
Try: Nancekivell (2), Bassett, Peters; Con: Champion (2); Pen: Champion (3)		Try: Johnson, Scully, Harrison; Con: Liley; Pen: Liley (2)

Twickenham
Attendance: 56,000
Referee: Roger Quittenton (London)

15	Kevin Thomas	Plymouth Albion
14	Tony Mead	Plymouth Albion
13	Chris Alcock (capt)	Camborne & Royal Navy
12	Grant Champion	Truro & Devon & Cornwall Police
11	Tommy Bassett	St Ives
10	Billy Peters	St Ives
9	Richard Nancekivell	Northampton
1	John May	Redruth
2	Graham Dawe	Bath
3	Richard Keast	Redruth
4	Glyn Williams	Redruth
5	Mark Wesson	Plymouth Albion
6	Andy Reed	Bath
7	Adrian Bick	Plymouth Albion
8	Jason Atkinson	St Ives
Replacements:
	Mark Chatterton	Exeter (for Alcock)
	Keith Plummer	Cleve
	Stuart Whitworth	Redruth
	Adam Ellery	St Mary's Hospital
	Brian Andrew	Camborne
	Paul Thomason	Redruth

15	John Liley	Leicester
14	Mike Harrison (capt)	Wakefield
13	Jason Georgiou	Halifax
12	Paul Johnson	Headingley
11	Ericson Atkins	Harrogate
10	Steve Townend	Wakefield
9	Dave Scully	Wakefield
1	John Woodthorpe	Harrogate
2	Steve Cruise	Wakefield
3	Roger Burman	Wakefield
4	Ian Carroll	Otley
5	Simon Croft	Harrogate
6	Simon Tipping	Otley
7	Peter Buckton	Liverpool St Helens
8	Sean Bainbridge	Morley
Replacements:
	Jim Mallinder	Sale
	Andy Caldwell	Harrogate
	Ian Wright	Sheffield
	Philip Wright	Middlesbrough
	John Fletcher	Bradford & Bingley
	Jim Chapman	Middlesbrough

== See also ==
- English rugby union system
- Rugby union in England
