= 2003–04 Rugby Union County Championship =

English rugby union competition

2003–2004 Tetley's Bitter County Championship
- Countries: England
- Champions: Devon (8th title)
- Runners-up: Gloucestershire

The 2003–04 Tetley's Bitter Rugby Union County Championship was the 104th edition of England's County Championship rugby union club competition.

Devon won their eighth title after defeating Gloucestershire in the final.

== Final ==
29 May 2004

Devon	43–14	Gloucestershire
Try: Sykes, Reed, Lowrie, Lewsey, Perry, Worthington; Con: Barnes (2); Pen: Barnes (3); Drop: Barnes		Try: Crampton; Pen: Jones (3)

Twickenham
Referee: Trevor Fisher

Gary Kingdom	Exeter Chiefs
Martin Worthington	Unattached
Ed Lewsey	Exeter Chiefs
Pat Sykes	Plymouth Albion
Luke Arscott	Plymouth Albion
Ed Barnes	Bedford Blues
Richard John	Crediton
Dan Parkes	Plymouth Albion
Graham Dawe	Plymouth Albion
Wayne Reed	Barnstaple
Simon Gibbons	Exeter Chiefs
R Hunt	Unattached
Alan Miller	Exeter Chiefs
Danny Thomas	Plymouth Albion
Chris Lowrie (capt)	Plymouth Albion
Replacements:
Tim Mathias	Plymouth Albion
Keith Brooking	Exeter Chiefs
Ryan Hopkins	Plymouth Albion
J Hart	Brixham
C Hanson	Unattached
Tom Barlow	Plymouth Albion
Steve Perry	Plymouth Albion

Nathan Bressington	Pertemps Bees
Andy Macrae	Lydney
Ed Crampton	Stroud
Duncan Murray	Worcester
Graham Robertson	St Mary's Old Boys
Craig Jones	Stourbridge
Leon Liggett	Coney Hill
Paul Price	Lydney
Ben Lewis	Berry Hill
A Martin	Cinderford
James Bashford	Lydney
Andy Geary	Gloucester Old Boys
Rob James (capt)	Cinderford
Sean Williams	Dings Crusaders
Vince Murrell	Dings Crusaders
Replacements:
Scott Pollock	Old Patesians
Gary Leadbeater	Newbury
Tony Down	Thornbury
S Price	Cinderford
R Davies	Newbury
N Smith	Weston-super-Mare
James Pettigrew	Old Patesians
Coach:
Mike Rafter

== See also ==
- English rugby union system
- Rugby union in England
