= 1894–95 Rugby Union County Championship =

English rugby union competition

1894–95 County Championship
- Countries: England
- Date: October 1894 - March 1895
- Champions: Yorkshire (6th title)

The 1894–95 Rugby Union County Championship was the seventh edition of England's premier rugby union club competition at the time.

Yorkshire won the competition for the sixth time, defeating Cumberland in the decisive tie of the Championship Series.

== Group stage ==
=== Group winners ===
Division	Winners
South-western group	Devon
South-eastern group	Midland Counties
North-western group	Cumberland
North-eastern group	Yorkshire

=== South-western group ===
South-western group	P	W	D	L	F	A	Pts
Devon	3	3	0	0	47	14	6
Somerset	3	2	0	1			4
Gloucestershire	3	1	0	2			2
Cornwall	3	0	0	3	11	47	0

- Devon beat Gloucestershire 16 – 9 on 17 November 1894.

17 November 1894

Cornwall	8 – 16 (5 – 3)	Somerset
Try: Triggs; Paige; Con: Viant		Try: Mermagen; Westcott; Gilmore; Woods; Drop: McLier

Penzance
Attendance: 1200
Referee: Fred Hall

- Eight Cornish players made their championship debut. Three Somerset players were England internationals.

1 December 1894

Cornwall	0 – 23	Devon

Redruth

8 December 1894

Gloucestershire	8 – 3 (5 – 3)	Cornwall
Try: Bowley c Lockyer; Con: Hames		Pen: Tarbutt

Kingsholm, Gloucester

8 December 1894

Somerset	5 – 8 (0 – 5)	Devon
Try: Mermagen; Con: Woods		Try: Stoyle; Sowden; Con: Hocken

Weston
Attendance: 5000

== Championship series ==
Date	Venue	Team One	Team Two	Score
29 Jan	Coventry	Midland Counties	Devon	5-5
11 Feb	Leicester	Midland Counties	Yorkshire	2-2
6 Mar	Plymouth	Devon	Yorkshire	3-8
14 Mar	Workington	Cumberland	Midland Counties	10-0
21 Mar	Carlisle	Cumberland	Devon	7-3
27 Mar	Manningham	Yorkshire	Cumberland	5-3

=== Decisive match ===
27 March 1895

Yorkshire	5–3	Cumberland
Try: Parkin; Con: Lorimer		Try: Moore

Manningham, Bradford
Referee: J Ashton (Lancashire)

E. Lorimer	Manningham
Osbert Mackie	Wakefield Trinity
A. Davey	Castleford
J. H. Crompton	Bradford
E. Parkin	Liversedge
George Mosley	Leeds Parish Church
Robert Wood	Liversedge
John Toothill (c)	Bradford
Tom Broadley	West Riding
G. Nowell	Leeds
W. Sutcliffe	Huddersfield
H. Ward	Castleford
William Walton	Castleford
Fred Clegg	Manningham
Alf Barraclough	Manningham

J Moore	Millom
T Ritson	Cockermouth
W Nelson	Millom
T Fletcher	Seaton
W Cunningham	Millom
W S Graham	Carlisle
G Messenger	Aspatria
J Davidson	Aspatria
G Steel	Aspatria
J Beil	Carlisle
W Moore	Millom
D Elliot	Carlisle
J Fawcett	Millom
W Falcon	Millom & Cambridge University
R Bell	Workington

== See also ==
- English rugby union system
- Rugby union in England
