= 2005–06 Rugby Union County Championship =

English rugby union competition

2005–2006 Tetley's Bitter County Championship
- Countries: England
- Champions: Lancashire (18th title)
- Runners-up: Devon

The 2005–06 Tetley's Bitter Rugby Union County Championship was the 106th edition of England's County Championship rugby union club competition.

Lancashire won their 18th title (beating Gloucestershire's record) after defeating Devon in the final.

== Final ==
29 May 2006

Lancashire	32–26	Devon
Try: Payne (2), Van der Venter, McCormack; Con: Nutt (3); Pen: Nutt (2)		Try: Lowrie, Kingdom; Con: Kingdom (2); Pen: Kingdom (4)

Twickenham
Referee: Geirant Ashton Jones

Warren Spragg	Orrell
Neil Kerfoot	Waterloo
Chris Briers	Orrell
Freeman Payne	Waterloo
Jalo van der Venter	Waterloo
Steve Nutt	Waterloo
Dave McCormack (capt)	Sedgley Park
Martin O'Keefe	Waterloo
Jonny Roddam	Sedgley Park
Alan Yates	Westcliff
Paul Arnold	Nottingham
Erik Lund	Sedgley Park
Richard Senior	Sedgley Park
Dan Palmer	Waterloo
Adam Newton	Sale
Replacements:
Chris Leck	Sale
Matt Collie	Orrell
Alex Loney	Nottingham
Ben Lloyd	Sale
Glynn Dewhurst	Preston Grasshoppers
Coach:
Mark Nelson

Gary Kingdom	Exeter Chiefs
Jon Fabian	Plymouth Albion
Keni Fisilau	Plymouth Albion
Sam Leung-Wai	Plymouth Albion
Ed Barnes	Plymouth Albion
Pat Sykes	Plymouth Albion
Richard John	Launceston
Tim Mathias	Weston-super-Mare
James Owen	Plymouth Albion
Ryan Hopkins	Plymouth Albion
Mike Lewis	Plymouth Albion
Brett Luxton	Launceston
Gary Willis	Exeter Chiefs
Brett Stroud	Plymouth Albion
Chris Lowrie (capt)	Plymouth Albion
Replacements:
Danny Thomas	Plymouth Albion
Danny Porte	Exeter Chiefs
Graham Dawe	Plymouth Albion
Wayne Reed	Launceston
Dave Kimberley	Launceston
Coach:
Graham Dawe & John Roberts

== See also ==
- English rugby union system
- Rugby union in England
