= 2001–02 Rugby Union County Championship =

English rugby union competition

2001–2002 Tetley's Bitter County Championship
- Countries: England
- Champions: Gloucestershire (17th title)
- Runners-up: Cheshire

The 2001–02 Tetley's Bitter Rugby Union County Championship was the 102nd edition of England's County Championship rugby union club competition.

Gloucestershire won their 17th title after defeating Cheshire in the final.

== Final ==
1 June 2002

Gloucestershire	26–23	Cheshire
Try: D Knight (2), P Knight; Con: Pollok; Pen: Pollok (3)		Try: Jones, Sutton; Con: Brett (2); Pen: Brett (3)

Twickenham
Referee: Tim Miller

1	Tony Windo	Worcester
2	Paul Price	Lydney
3	Lee Fortey	Birmingham & Solihull
4	Chris Raymond	Old Patesianss
5	Dave Sims (capt)	Worcester
6	Rob James	Stroud
7	Nathan Carter	Worcester
8	Julian Horrobin	Coventry
9	Paul Knight	Birmingham & Solihull
10	Steve Thompson	Stroud
11	Neal Ainscow	Cheltenham
12	Mike Davies	Caerphilly
13	Simon Martin	Coventry
14	Scott Pollok	Old Patesians
15	Dave Knight	Birmingham & Solihull
Replacements:
16	Ed Crampton	Stroud
17	John Farr	Stroud
18	Kevin Dunn	Gloucester Old Boys
19	Virgil Hartland	Old Patesians
20	Andy Geary	Army & Glamorgan Wanderers
21	Matt Dawson	Old Patesians
22	Adam Tarplee	Stroud
Coach:
	Mike Rafter

1	Scott Goodfellow	Macclesfield
2	Ian Taylor	Macclesfield
3	Steve Mannion	Macclesfield
4	Andy Monighan	Orrell
5	Richard Bradshaw	Manchester
6	Geoff Jones (capt)	Doncaster
7	James White	Manchester
8	Jon Sewell	New Brighton
9	Chris Kinsey	Lymm
10	Ian Kennedy	Birkenhead Park
11	Martin Sutton	Birkenhead Park
12	Andy Kahn	Manchester
13	Paul Brett	New Brighton
14	David Strettle	Lymm
15	Marcus Barrow	Manchester
Replacements:
16	Mark Dorrington	New Brighton
17	Karl Davies	New Brighton
18	Rob Bieniasz	Manchester
19	Jeremy Bostock	Macclesfield
20	Jon Shudall	Birkenhead Park
21	James Moore	Sale Sharks
22	Richard Hughes	Manchester
23	Andy Perry	Sale Jets
24	John Plant	Macclesfield
Coach:
	Shaun Gallagher

== See also ==
- English rugby union system
- Rugby union in England
