= 1911–12 Rugby Union County Championship =

English rugby union competition

1911–12 County Championship
- Countries: England
- Champions: Devon (6th title)
- Runners-up: Northumberland

The 1911–12 Rugby Union County Championship was the 24th edition of England's premier rugby union club competition at the time.

Devon won the competition for the sixth time defeating Northumberland in the final.

== Semifinals ==
Date	Venue	Team one	Team two	Score
25 Jan	Northampton	East Midlands	Devon	3-18

== Final ==
24 February 1912

Devon	29–0	Northumberland
Try: Edwards, Baker (4); Con: Hayman (2); Drop: Lillicrap

Rectory Ground, Devonport
Attendance: 12,000
Referee: H A Taylor (London)

F J Lillicrap	Devonport Albion
P J Baker	Plymouth
E G Butcher	Plymouth
E Thomas	Devonport Albion
G S Harvey	Devonport Albion
Raphael Jago (capt)	Devonport Albion
A J Monk	Devonport Albion
H Snell	Seaton
D Holland	Devonport Albion
E J Lee	Devonport Albion
W H Pope	Devonport Albion
A Lancaster	Devonport Albion
J Edwards	Plymouth
T Hayman	Devonport Albion
C Waye	Devonport Albion

W Robb	Tynedale
Alan Roberts	Northern
G H Dodds	Northern
J V Barron	Northern
E Thompson	Gosforth Nomads
R Lunn	Gosforth Nomads
U Alexander	Old Novocastrians
Alf Kewney	Rockliff
J A S Bitson	Northern
A B Thompson	Northern
W Dodds	Northern
J Morley	Rockliff
R Stewart	Old Novocastrians
M Morrison	Percy Park
H O Robinson	Gosforth Nomads

== See also ==
- English rugby union system
- Rugby union in England
