= 2004–05 Rugby Union County Championship =

English rugby union competition

2004–2005 Tetley's Bitter County Championship
- Countries: England
- Champions: Devon (9th title)
- Runners-up: Lancashire

The 2004–05 Tetley's Bitter Rugby Union County Championship was the 105th edition of England's County Championship rugby union club competition.

Devon won their ninth title after defeating Lancashire in the final.

== Final ==
29 May 2005

Devon	22–16	Lancashire
Try: Arscott, Barnes; Pen: Barnes (4)		Try: Voortman; Con: Hunter; Pen: Hunter (3)

Twickenham
Referee: Robin Goodliffe

Gary Kingdom
Chris Lowrie (capt)
Kenni Fisilau
Pat Sykes
Luke Arscott
Ed Barnes
Replacements:
Coach:
Graham Dawe

Warren Spragg	Orrell
Neil Kerfoot	Waterloo
Freeman Payne	Waterloo
Ian Voortman	Sedgley Park
Oliver Viney	Orrell
Neil Hunter	Waterloo
Dave McCormack	Sedgley Park
Martin O'Keefe	Birmingham & Solihull
Jonny Roddam	Orrell
Alan Yates	Orrell
Paul Arnold	Lydney
Erik Lund	Sedgley Park
Richard Senior (capt)	Sedgley Park
Dave Wilks	Orrell
Tim Fourie	Sedgley Park
Replacements:
Chris Tyms	Waterloo
Njike Tchakoute	Waterloo
Alistair Livesey	Orrell
Alistair Atkinson	Orrell
Nick Flynn	Manchester
Chris Wilkinson	Sedgley Park
Richard Kenyon	Fylde
Coach:
Mark Nelson

== See also ==
- English rugby union system
- Rugby union in England
