= 1935–36 Rugby Union County Championship =

English rugby union competition

1935–36 County Championship
- Countries: England
- Champions: Hampshire (2nd title)
- Runners-up: Northumberland

The 1935–36 Rugby Union County Championship was the 43rd edition of England's premier rugby union club competition at the time.

Hampshire won the competition for the second time after defeating Northumberland in the final.

== Final ==
14 March 1936

Northumberland	6–13	Hampshire
Try: Errington, Paulin		Try: Rawlence, Hordern; Con: Owen (2); Pen: Owen

Gosforth
Referee: R B Hunt

E R Blench	Tynedale
G H Bailey	Old Novocastrians
C R Wood	Gosforth
T B Bland	Tynedale
J C Oldroyd	Northern
B Liddle	Tynedale
A Brogden	Tynedale
A C Barker	Old Novocastrians
J C Suddes	Tynedale
E Paulin	Old Novocastrians
K W D Hodgson	Tynedale
R Robinson	Northern
John Hodgson	Northern
G S Walter	Blackheath
C Errington	Gosforth

S J Howard-Jones	Aldershot Services
T G V Stevenson	Aldershot Services
Tuppy Owen-Smith	St Mary's Hospital
W T Anderson	Harlequins
John Rawlence	Cambridge University
K P P Goldschmidt	Trojans
R E Lander	Trojans
V J Pike	Blackheath
C R Owen	Army
N J Newton	Bournemouth
A Boast	Salisbury
J P Evans	Aldershot Services
Dudley Kemp	Trojans
Peter Hordern	Gloucester
R J L Hammond	United Services

== See also ==
- English rugby union system
- Rugby union in England
