= 1999–2000 Rugby Union County Championship =

England's 100th edition county championship

1999–2000 Tetley's Bitter County Championship
- Countries: England
- Champions: Yorkshire (13th title)
- Runners-up: Devon

The 1999–2000 Tetley's Bitter Rugby Union County Championship was the 100th edition of England's County Championship rugby union club competition.

Yorkshire won their 13th title, after defeating Devon in the final.

== Final ==
3 June 2000

Yorkshire	16–9	Devon
Try: Kirkby; Con: Clappison; Pen: Clappison, Winney (2)		Pen: Barlow (3)

Twickenham
Attendance: 4,000
Referee: Chris White (Gloucester)

Mark Wolff	Sandal
Danny Scarborough	Wakefield
Mark Billington	Otley
Whinney	Wakefield
Mark Kirkby	Otley
Dan Clappison	Otley
Morgan	Harrogate
Rod Latham	Wakefield
John Lawn (capt)	Wharfedale
Richard Szabo	Halifax
Dave Lister	Wharfedale
Peter Taylor	Harrogate
Lafaele Filipo	Otley
Hedley Verity	Wharfedale
Replacements:
Robert Whatmuff	Otley (for Clappison h-t)
Andy Brown	Otley (for Morgan 56m)
Rob Faulkner	Harrogate (for Szabo 60m)
Coach:
Jim Kilfoyle

15	Russell Thompson	Plymouth Albion
14	Steve Walklin	Plymouth Albion
13	Brian Meinung	Exeter
12	Richard Henwood	Plymouth Albion
11	Martyn Ridley	Exeter
10	Tom Barlow	Plymouth Albion
9	Lee Thomas	Plymouth Albion
1	Alan Pavor	Plymouth Albion
2	Graham Dawe (capt)	Plymouth Albion
3	Wayne Reed	Plymouth Albion
4	Jon Axon	Withycombe
5	Marcus Keenor	South Molton
6	Jason Hart	Brixham
7	Roger Hutchinson	Bridgwater & Albion
8	Bret Luxton	Launceston
Replacements:
	Andy Matchett	Sidmouth (for Walklin 70m)
	Richard John	Exeter (for Walklin 47m)
	Phil Webster	Tiverton (for Dawe 72m)
	James Alvis	Bridgwater & Albion (for Reed 53m)
	Danny Thomas	Barnstaple (for Hutchinson 62m)
	Nick Burnett	Lydney (for Luxton 56m)

== See also ==
- English rugby union system
- Rugby union in England
