= 1994–95 Rugby Union County Championship =

English rugby union competition

1994–95 CIS Insurance County Championship
- Countries: England
- Champions: Warwickshire (10th title)
- Runners-up: Northumberland

The 1994–95 CIS Insurance Rugby Union County Championship was the 95th edition of England's County Championship rugby union club competition.

Warwickshire won their 10th title after defeating Northumberland in the final.

== Final ==
22 April 1995

Warwickshire	15–9	Northumberland
Pen: Quantrill (5)		Pen: Johnson (3)

Twickenham
Attendance: 6,000
Referee: M Bayliss (Gloucestershire)

15	Jim Quantrill	Rugby
14	Andy Smallwood	Nottingham
13	Adrian Gillhouley	Rugby
12	Mark Palmer	Rugby
11	Dean Watson	Rugby
10	M Gallagher	Nottingham
9	M Warr	Sale
1	Gareth Tregilgas (capt)	Coventry
2	D Addleton	Coventry
3	Trevor Revan	Rugby
4	D Oram	Rugby
5	S Smith	Rugby
6	Phil Bowman	Rugby
7	Steve Carter	Coventry
8	Mark Ellis	Kenilworth

15	Michael Old	Tynedale
14	Graham Ward	Novocastrians
13	Ross Wilkinson	Newcastle Gosforth
12	Ian Chandler	Newcastle Gosforth
11	David Rees	Sale
10	David Johnson	Blaydon
9	Simon Clayton-Hibbott	Tynedale
1	Richard Parker (capt)	Tynedale
2	Ed Parker	Tynedale
3	Duncan Clark	Morpeth
4	Kevin Westgarth	West Hartlepool
5	Richard Metcalfe	Newcastle Gosforth
6	Rob Hoole	Newcastle Gosforth
7	Neil Frankland	Newcastle Gosforth
8	David Guthrie	Blaydon
Replacements:
16	Paul Winter	Tynedale
17	John Goodfellow	Morpeth
18	Stephen Dunn	Tynedale
19	Stephen Turnbull	Tynedale (temp for Guthrie)
20	Mark Carr	Percy Park
22	George Robson	Newcastle Gosforth

== See also ==
- English rugby union system
- Rugby union in England
