= 1926–27 Rugby Union County Championship =

English rugby union competition

1926–27 County Championship
- Countries: England
- Champions: Kent (3rd title)
- Runners-up: Leicestershire

The 1926–27 Rugby Union County Championship was the 34th edition of England's premier rugby union club competition at the time.

Kent won the competition for the third time after defeating Leicestershire in the final.

== Final ==
12 March 1927

| Kent | 22–12 | Leicestershire |
| Try: Hodgson, Bryan, Kendall (2), Eyres; Con: Kemp (2); Pen: Kemp | | Try: Buckingham; Con: Prentice; Pen: Prentice; Drop: Sambrook |

Rectory Field, Blackheath
Referee: W H Jackson (Camborne)

| Jack Hubbard | Harlequins |
| Cliff Gibbs | Harlequins |
| J T Kemp | Blackheath |
| W E W Kendall | Blackheath |
| G J Bryan | Army |
| A F Hamilton-Smythe | Blackheath |
| Arthur Young | Blackheath |
| F W R Douglas (capt) | Richmond |
| J W Cuthbert | Royal Naval College, Greenwich |
| J N Young | Old Blues |
| William Pratten | Blackheath |
| P Chichester | Blackheath |
| C J W Hodgson | Old Blues |
| Wallace Eyres | Royal Naval College, Greenwich |
| G A C Hamilton | Richmond & Cambridge University |

| L C Sambrook | Leicester |
| W E Farndon | Leicester |
| M S Holden | Leicester |
| O C Bryson | Leicester |
| R A Buckingham | Leicester |
| F Wood | Leicester |
| H D Greenlees | Leicester |
| L W Burton | Leicester |
| Doug Prentice (capt) | Leicester |
| D J Norman | Leicester |
| E G Coleman | Leicester |
| A H Greenwood | Leicester |
| T H Briers | Leicester |
| N T Thorneloe | Leicester |
| Norman Coates | Leicester |

== See also ==
- English rugby union system
- Rugby union in England
