= 1923–24 Rugby Union County Championship =

English rugby union competition

1923–24 County Championship
- Countries: England
- Champions: Cumberland (1st title)
- Runners-up: Kent

The 1923–24 Rugby Union County Championship was the 31st edition of England's premier rugby union club competition at the time.

Cumberland won the competition for the first time after defeating Kent in the final.

== Semifinals ==
Date	Venue	Team one	Team two	Score
22 Mar	Carlisle	Cumberland	Leicestershire	12-8
2 Feb	Rectory Field	Kent	Somerset	23-0

== Final ==
5 April 1924

Cumberland	14–3	Kent
Try: Tucker, Burrows (2); Con: x1 Pen: Holliday; Drop: T Little (2)		Try: Jacob

Carlisle
Attendance: 10,000
Referee: A W Angus (Scotland)

J Brough	Silloth
W Burrows	Workington
B H G Tucker (capt)	Army & Carlisle
Tom Holliday	Aspatria
E E Cass	Rhine Army
J Little	Workington
T Little	Workington
Thomas Lawson	Working
R Hanvay	Blennerhasset
Richard Lawson	Working
J Ward	Aspatria
Wt. H Walling	Kirkby Lonsdale
H Wills	Kendal
J McCade	Keswick
T Cavaghan	Carlisle

J C Collett	Blackheath
B K Millar	London Scottish
Jake Jacob	Blackheath
J Batty	Old Dunstonians
Jack Hubbard	Blackheath
W E W Kendall	Blackheath
J T Kemp	Blackheath
B G Schofield	Guy's Hospital
R S Hellier	Old Alleynians
Leslie Haslett	Blackheath
F W R Douglas	Richmond
W H Aitken	United Services Chatham
A E Beith	St Bartholomews's Hospital
G E Roeber	Blackheath
C J W Hodgson	Old Blues

== See also ==
- English rugby union system
- Rugby union in England
