= 1925–26 Rugby Union County Championship =

English rugby union competition

1925–26 County Championship
- Countries: England
- Champions: Yorkshire (8th title)
- Runners-up: Hampshire

The 1925–26 Rugby Union County Championship was the 33rd edition of England's premier rugby union club competition at the time.

Yorkshire won the competition for the eighth time (but first for thirty years) after defeating Hampshire in the final.

== Final ==
10 April 1926

Yorkshire	15–14	Hampshire
Try: Tetley, Myers, Caiger; Con: Macauley; Drop: Roberts		Try: Fulljames, Palmer; Con: Richmond; Pen: Richmond

Bradford
Referee: W H Jackson (Cornwall)

G Harnell	Wakefield
C F Tetley	Ilkley
Edward Myers	Bradford
F Roberts	Bradford
F T Adams	Halifax
H Fletcher	Bramley Old Boys
H Thompson	Otley
R S Whitfield	Batley
J H Eastwood	Halifax
G Caiger	Sedbergh
R C Hart	Headingley
C H Wrighton	Bradford
K A Macauley	Bradford
H Wilkinson	Halifax
B L Proctor	Headingley

Kenneth Sellar	United Services
Godfrey Palmer	Richmond
O R Fulljames	Rosslyn Park
F E Down	United Services & Army
M Richmond	United Services & Navy
F M T Bunney	Richmond
R M Phillips	Army
J S Chick	Harlequins & Royal Air Force
G F C Branson	United Services & Navy
R C Forbes-Brassett	Richmond
W G Agnew	United Services
J D Clinch	United Services & Army
Charles Faithfull	United Services & Army
D C D Ryder	Blackheath
David Turquand-Young	Richmond & Army

== See also ==
- English rugby union system
- Rugby union in England
