= 1934–35 Rugby Union County Championship =

English rugby union competition

1934–35 County Championship
- Countries: England
- Champions: Lancashire (2nd title)
- Runners-up: Somerset

The 1934–35 Rugby Union County Championship was the 42nd edition of England's premier rugby union club competition at the time.

Lancashire won the competition for the second time (the first being in 1891) after defeating Somerset in the final.

== Final ==
9 March 1935

Somerset	0–14	Lancashire
		Try: Meikle, Craven, Heaton, Leyland; Con: Horne; Drop: Heaton

Recreation Ground (Bath)
Referee: J Hughes

K C Kinnersley	Bristol
H Sherman	Bristol
Ronald Gerrard	Bath
G Criddle	Navy
J E Morris	Weston-super-Mare
J H Bailey	Navy
H Davies	Bath
F W Williams	Weston-super-Mare
Gordon Gregory	Blackheath
C C Kent	Weston-super-Mare
J Price	Taunton
J S Wood	Bath
F C Goddard	Taunton R.F.C.
G Maunder	Wellington
John Watkins	Navy

R Horne	Furness
D H M Craven	Fylde
Jack Heaton	Liverpool University
Roy Leyland	Liverpool University
Graham Meikle	Waterloo
L Swann	Fylde
J Bowker	Furness
Joe Mycock	Sale
J A Cooper	Rosslyn Park F.C.
Henry Fry	Liverpool
W G Thomas	Waterloo
G P C Vallance	Leicester
Henry Toft	Waterloo
W H Leather	Liverpool
W J Leather	Liverpool

== See also ==
- English rugby union system
- Rugby union in England
