= 1995–96 Rugby Union County Championship =

English rugby union competition

1995–96 CIS Insurance County Championship
- Countries: England
- Champions: Gloucestershire (16th title)
- Runners-up: Warwickshire

The 1995–96 CIS Insurance Rugby Union County Championship was the 96th edition of England's County Championship rugby union club competition.

Gloucestershire won their 16th title after defeating Warwickshire in the final.

== Final ==
20 April 1996

Gloucestershire	17–13	Warwickshire
Try: Stanley, Davis; Con: Smith (2); Pen: Smith		Try: Warr; Con: Gallagher; Pen: Gallagher (2)

Twickenham
Attendance: 7,750
Referee: Brian Campsall (Yorkshire)

15	Tim Smith	Gloucester
14	Jeremy Perrins	Gloucester
13	Duncan Edwards	Berry Hill
12	Lee Osborne	Gloucester
11	Derrick Morgan	Cheltenham
10	Robert Mills	Lydney
9	Julian Davis	Lydney
1	Robert Phillips	Cheltenham
2	Nicholas Nelmes	Lydney
3	Simon Baldwin	Gloucester Old Boys
4	Timothy Clink	Cheltenham
5	John Brain	Cheltenham
6	Adrian Knox	Lydney
7	Andrew Stanley (capt)	Gloucester
8	Ian Patten	Coventry
Replacements:
16	Philip Stanlake	Cheltenham
17	Ian Morgan	Cinderford
18	Giles Shipton	Stroud
19	Karl Kocerhan	Berry Hill
20	Jeffrey Cole	Gloucester Old Boys
21	Robert Rees	Lydney

15	A R Parton	Henley
14	J S Minshull	Kenilworth
13	M Curtis	Coventry
12	Mark Palmer	Rugby
11	Dean Watson	Rugby
10	M D Gallagher	Nottingham
9	M Warr	Sale
1	Gareth Tregilgas (capt)	Coventry
2	R L Burdett	Rugby
3	Trevor Revan	Rugby
4	S D Smith	Rugby
5	Phil Bowman	Rugby
6	Mark Ellis	Rugby
7	Steve Carter	Rugby
8	Mark Fountaine	Bristol
Replacements:
16	S J Baker	Rugby
17	Simon Reid	Nuneaton
18	Neil Riley	Kenilworth
19	Adrian Gillhoully	Rugby
20	Rob Millner	Rugby
21	A Ruddlesdin	Long Buckby (for Ellis 69 mins)

== See also ==
- English rugby union system
- Rugby union in England
