= Richard Sharp (rugby union) =

British Lions and England rugby union player (1938–2025)

Richard Sharp OBE
- Born: Richard Adrian William Sharp; 9 September 1938 Bangalore, Kingdom of Mysore, India
- Died: 3 November 2025 (aged 87)
- School: Blundell's School
- University: Balliol College, University of Oxford

Rugby union career
- Position: Flyhalf
Senior career
Years	Team	Apps	(Points)
1960–61	Barbarians		
1959–62	Oxford University		
1957–66	Cornwall	28	
1957–	Wasps		
–	Redruth		
–	Bristol		
International career
Years	Team	Apps	(Points)
1962	British and Irish Lions	2	(3)
1960–67	England	14	(26)

Richard Adrian William Sharp OBE (9 September 1938 – 3 November 2025) was an English rugby union player. Born in India during the British Raj, his family moved to Cornwall, England, where he was educated at Montpelier School, Paignton and Blundell's School in the neighbouring county of Devon and at Balliol College, Oxford. He was a player at Redruth R.F.C., Wasps FC, Bristol FC and for England (14 caps) as fly-half and captain. He played for England while at Oxford and led England to the Five Nations title in 1963. He played cricket for Cornwall in the Minor Counties Championship between 1957 and 1970.

He was appointed Officer of the Order of the British Empire (OBE) in the 1986 New Year Honours, for services to Sport, particularly in the South West.

Bernard Cornwell named the fictional character Richard Sharpe after him.

Sharp died from complications of Parkinson's disease on 3 November 2025, at the age of 87.

Sporting positions
Preceded by Dickie Jeeps	England national rugby union team captain 1963	Succeeded by Mike Weston
Preceded by Budge Rogers	England national rugby union team captain 1967	Succeeded by Phil Judd
