= 1997–98 Rugby Union County Championship =

English rugby union competition

1997–98 Tetley's Bitter County Championship
- Countries: England
- Champions: Cheshire (3rd title)
- Runners-up: Cornwall

The 1997–98 Tetley's Bitter Rugby Union County Championship was the 98th edition of England's County Championship rugby union club competition.

Cheshire won their third title after defeating Cornwall in the final.

== Final ==
18 April 1998

Cheshire	21–14	Cornwall
Try: Briers, Blood; Con: Swindells; Pen: Swindells (2); Drop: Guest		Try: Nancekivell; Pen: Sloma (3)

Twickenham
Attendance: 32,350
Referee: Ashley Rowden (Berkshire)

15	Steve Swindells	Manchester
14	Mike Blood	Manchester
13	Cambel Ball	Widnes
12	Richard Hughes	New Brighton
11	Matt Hoskin	Manchester
10	Alex Guest	New Brighton
9	Nick Briers	London Irish
1	Mark Dorrington	New Brighton
2	Luke Hewson	Manchester
3	Mike Hill	Widnes
4	Dave Craddock	Manchester
5	Matt Kirke	Macclesfield
6	Geoff Jones	New Brighton
7	Kevin Brookman (capt)	New Brighton
8	Stuart Beeley	Widnes
Replacements:
16	Andy Yates	Lymm (for Hewson 66m)
17	Steve Dorrington	New Brighton (for Hill 54m)
18	Tim Wasdell	Chester (for Jones 60m)
19	Simon Wright	New Brighton (for Briers 75m)
20	Murray King	Widnes (for Swindells 73m)
21	Ian Kennedy	New Brighton (for Blood 79m)

15	Danny Sloman	Launceston
14	Rob Thirlby	Redruth
13	Jimmy Tucker	Launceston
12	Kevin Thomas	Truro
11	Richard Newton	Redruth
10	Stewart Whitworth	Redruth
9	Chris Whitworth	Redruth
1	Peter Risdon	Launceston
2	Barry Lucas	Launceston
3	Steve Rush	Launceston
4	Glyn Hutchings	Launceston
5	Tony Cook	Hayle
6	James Willcocks	Launceston
7	Martin Addinall	Penryn
8	Dean Shipton (capt)	Launceston
Replacements:
16	Richard Nancekivell	Launceston (for C Whitworth 71m)
17	Eddie Nancekivell	Launceston (for Newton 52m)
18	Jason Atkinson	St Ives (for Willcocks 62m)
19	Lee Mruk	Penzance & Newlyn (for Cook 45m)
20	Richard Tonkin	Launceston
21	Neil Douch	Redruth

== See also ==
- English rugby union system
- Rugby union in England
