= 1899–1900 Rugby Union County Championship =

English rugby union competition

1899–1900 County Championship
- Countries: England
- Champions: Durham (1st title)
- Runners-up: Devon

The 1898–99 Rugby Union County Championship was the 12th edition of England's premier rugby union club competition at the time.

Durham won the competition for the first time defeating Devon in the final.

== Final ==
8 April 1900

Devon	3–11	Durham
Try: Thomas		Try: Carmidy

Exeter
Attendance: 10,000–13,000
Referee: E B Holmes (Midland Counties)

A Richards	Barnstaple
Sydney Coopper	R.N.E College
T Mills	Plymouth
H J Vyvyan	Albion
H B J Taylor	Newton Abbot
J Jones	Unattached
T Dunn	Torquay Athletic
Charlie Thomas (capt)	Barnstaple
A O'Neill	Torquay Athletic
W Spiers	Devonport Albion
P Baron	Sidmouth
J Powell	Exeter
C Avery	Plymouth
Denys Dobson	Newton Abbot & Oxford University
E W Roberts	R.N.E College

J Hegg	West Hartlepool
W Taylor	Tudhoe
J Gordon	Tudhoe
W S Cox	Sunderland
E W Elliott	Sunderland
W Moffatt	Sunderland
H Gibbon	Hamsteels
J Frater	Tudhoe
J Carmidy	Tudhoe
A Stephenson	Tudhoe
G Richardson	Tudhoe
George Summerscale	Durham City
G H Lewis	West Hartlepool
G Simms	West Hartlepool
Hamm	Tudhoe

== See also ==
- English rugby union system
- Rugby union in England
