= 1991–92 Rugby Union County Championship =

English rugby union competition

1991–92 ADT County Championship
- Countries: England
- Champions: Lancashire (15th title)
- Runners-up: Cornwall

The 1991–92 ADT Security Systems Rugby Union County Championship was the 92nd edition of England's County Championship rugby union club competition.

Lancashire won their 15th title after defeating Cornwall in the final.

== Final ==
18 April 1992

Lancashire	9–6	Cornwall
Try: Jackson; Con: Grayson; Pen: Grayson		Pen: Thomas (2)

Twickenham
Attendance: 50,000
Referee: Ed Morrison (Bristol)

15	M Jackson	Fylde
14	G Meredith	Waterloo
13	I Wynn	Orrell
12	B Wellens	Orrell
11	A Parker	Fylde
10	Paul Grayson	Preston Grasshoppers
9	S Swarbrick	Vale of Lune
1	J Russell	Broughton Park
2	A Yates	Broughton Park
3	M Rydehalgh	Fylde
4	N Wilkinson	Waterloo
5	N Allott	Waterloo
6	Mike Kenrick (capt)	Sale
7	A Ireland	Fylde
8	S Bibby	Orrell
Replacements: (not used)
16	A Higgin	Vale of Lune
17	P Stansfield	Sale
18	C Mahon	Waterloo
19	D Sandford	Orrell
20	A Helme	Vale of Lune
21	P Ashcroft	Waterloo

15	Kevin Thomas	Redruth
14	Tony Mead	Redruth
13	Colin Laity	Neath
12	Matt Brain	Clifton
11	David Weeks	Camborne
10	Billy Peters	Bath
9	Richard Nancekivell	Northampton
1	John May	Redruth
2	B Andrew	Redruth
3	Richard Keast	Redruth
4	Andy Reed	Bath
5	A Cook	Redruth
6	Glyn Williams (capt)	Redruth
7	Adrian Bick	Penzance & Newlyn
8	Jason Atkinson	St Ives
Replacements:
16	M Gomez	Redruth
17	Stuart Whitworth	Redruth (for Peters)
18	C Whitworth	Redruth
19	Adam Ellery	Redruth
20	M Phillips	Redruth
21	J Mortimer	Redruth

== See also ==
- English rugby union system
- Rugby union in England
