= 2009–10 Rugby Union County Championship =

English rugby union competition

2009–2010 Bill Beaumont Cup County Championship
- Countries: England
- Champions: Lancashire (20th title)
- Runners-up: Gloucestershire

The 2009–10 Bill Beaumont Cup (Rugby Union County Championship) was the 110th edition of England's County Championship rugby union club competition.

Lancashire won their 20th title after defeating Gloucestershire in the final.

== Final ==
31 May 2010

Lancashire	36–6	Gloucestershire
Try: Arnold (2), Collins, Turner, Baleirara; Con: Collins (2), O'Brien (2); Pen: Collins		Pen: Stevenson, Trigg

Twickenham
Referee: Luke Pearce

Matt Riley (capt)	Sedgley Park
Mike Waywell	Fylde
Tom Brady	Sale Sharks
Alex Hurst	Fylde
Mark Turner	Liverpool St Helens
Steve Collins	Rochdale
Craig Aikman	Fylde
Adam Lewis	Fylde
Peter Ince	Caldy
Rob O'Donnell	Sale Sharks
Louis McGowan	Coventry
Gareth Rawlings	Longton
Jon Nugent	Caldy
Steve McGinnis	Fylde
Sam Beaumont	Fylde
Replacements:
Nick Flynn	Sedgley Park
Charlie Baleralera	Sale Jets
Paul Arnold	Caldy
Danny Baines	Macclesfield
James O'Brien	Waterloo
Oliver Brennand	Fylde
Ryan de la Harpe	Fylde

Martin Knight	Lydney
Tom Jarvis	Florence
Chris Ashwin	Bristol
Jack Gadd	Bristol
Nev Codlin	Cinderford
Tim Stevenson	Cinderford
Tom Richardson	Stourbridge
Matt Long (capt)	Birmingham & Solihull
Paul Finken	Newbury
Chas Meddick	Dings Crusaders
Danny Hodge	Newbury
Royce Cadman	Hartpury College
Ed King	Cinderford
Jack Preece	Birmingham & Solihull
Gavin Curry	Dings Crusaders
Replacements:
Sam Wilkes	Clifton
Tim Brocket	Dings Crusaders
Darren Barry	Clifton & Bristol
Marcus Brown	Cinderford
Barney Purbrook	Clifton
Jim Williams	Birmingham & Solihull
Danny Trigg	Cinderford

== See also ==
- English rugby union system
- Rugby union in England
