= 1996–97 Rugby Union County Championship =

English rugby union competition

1996–97 CIS Insurance County Championship
- Countries: England
- Champions: Cumbria (1st title)
- Runners-up: Somerset

The 1996–97 CIS Insurance Rugby Union County Championship was the 97th edition of England's County Championship rugby union club competition.

Cumbria won their first title (although Cumberland had won the title in 1924). They defeated Somerset in the final.

== Final ==
19 April 1997

Cumbria	21–13	Somerset
Try: Bell, Milnes; Con: Scott; Pen: Scott (3)		Try: Rees, King; Pen: Edmonds

Twickenham
Attendance: 8,150
Referee: Brian Campsall (Yorkshire)

15	Graeme Cook	Aspatria
14	D Warwick	Waterloo
13	Paul Burns (capt)	Furness
12	M Lynch	Wigton
11	Steven Davidson	Aspatria
10	Mike Scott	Aspatria
9	Paul Thompson	Wigton
1	Stephen Irving	Aspatria
2	Mike Armstrong	Wigton
3	J McCune	Aspatria
4	S Milnes	Aspatria
5	Andrew Bell	Wigton
6	B Atkinson	Egremont
7	Sean Cusack	Aspatria
8	Mark Richardson	Aspatria
Replacements:
	J Cartmell	Wigton (for S Cusack 25m)
	D Johnston	Wigton (for McCune 67m)
	P Cusack	Cockermouth (for Cook 70m)
	P Hancock	Aspatria (for Atkinson 72m)

M Westcott	Keynsham
D Underwood	Weston-super-Mare
D Fox	Keynsham
A Webber	Bridgwater & Albion
P Blackett	Keynsham
N Edmonds	Bridgwater & Albion
L Hirons	Keynsham
J Barnes	Bridgwater & Albion
C Rees	Bridgwater & Albion
A Harris	Bridgwater & Albion
J King	Hornets
M Rackham	Bridgwater & Albion
M Curry	Exeter
M Venner	Weston-super-Mare
S Withey	Keynsham
Replacements:
S Bennett	Keynsham (for Fox 41m)
B Thirlwall	Bridgwater & Albion (for Fox 41m)
N Lloyd	Clifton (for Fox 41m)

== See also ==
- English rugby union system
- Rugby union in England
