= County Championship (rugby union) =

Annual rugby union competition in England

- Current season, competition or edition: 2023 Bill Beaumont Championship Division 1
- Sport: Rugby union
- Founded: 1889; 137 years ago
- Owner: Rugby Football Union
- No. of teams: 12
- Country: England
- Most recent champion: Kent (2024) (5th title)
- Most titles: Lancashire (25)

The County Championship is an annual rugby union competition in England between teams representing English counties. After restructuring in 2007 the top tier of the Championship has been known as the Bill Beaumont Cup, after the trophy awarded to the competition winners was named in honour of Bill Beaumont, a former England and British & Irish Lions captain. In 2017 the competition was officially known as Bill Beaumont Division 1, with teams also competing in Division 2 and Division 3, which prior to 2017 were known as the Plate and Shield competitions.

The Championship has a long history, being first officially recognised by the Rugby Football Union in 1889. The 2018 Championship was the 118th competition. The most successful county, Lancashire, has won the competition 25 times, followed by Gloucestershire (17) and Yorkshire (15). Lancashire (34) & Gloucestershire (33) have made the most appearances in contested finals.

On four occasions the tournament final has been tied at full-time and a second leg rematch has been played. Two of these rematches were also tied and on these occasions (1907 and 1967) the finalists were declared joint winners. In 1991 the final match between Cornwall and Yorkshire was tied at full-time and extra time was played, with Cornwall winning 29–20. In 2001 the Championship did not take place due to the 2001 United Kingdom foot-and-mouth outbreak; instead Yorkshire and Cornwall were invited to play at Twickenham.

The 2015 final was contested by Lancashire and Cornwall, with the teams meeting in the final for the third consecutive year. Cornwall won the championship with an 18-13 victory, their fourth title overall and their first since 1999. Cornwall retained their title in 2016, this time beating Cheshire, 35–13. In 2017 Cornwall and Lancashire met in the final for the fourth time in five seasons. Lancashire won 19-8 and prevented Cornwall from completing a hat-trick of county titles.

== Structure ==
There was little formal structure to the first official years of the competition, with teams playing different numbers of matches and different opposition from across England. The winners were determined by a panel of judges from the RFU Committee. From 1891–1895, the four winners of four regional Championships (North East, North West, South East and South West) played a round-robin tournament to determine the overall winner of the County Championship.

A restructure in 1896, led to the creation of North and South regions only, the winners of these regional competitions playing a final for the County Championship. Another restructure in 1921 saw the formation of five regions and the knock-out stage of the championship extend to semi-finals and a final. The winners of the North East, North West and South East regions were entered into a semi-final draw along with the winners of a play-off between the winners of the South and South West regions.

From 2007 to 2016, the top eight counties were split into two regions of four teams, North and South, who played a round-robin tournament. The winners of each region competed for the English County Championship in the final. This format was repeated for the eight counties that competed for the County Championship Plate. The eleven counties which competed for the County Championship Shield were split into three pools from which the winners and the runner-up with the best record met in semi-final matches.

In 2017 the competition was given a new structure, with the top tier comprising twelve teams and the second and third tiers having eight teams each. Each tier has a final each year, but promotion and relegation between tiers is decided on a two-year basis.

== Past winners ==
=== 1889-1895 ===
Year	Winner	Regional Winners
1889	Yorkshire	
1890	Yorkshire	
1891	Lancashire	Gloucestershire, Surrey, Yorkshire
1892	Yorkshire	Kent, Lancashire, Midland Counties
1893	Yorkshire	Cumberland, Devon, Middlesex
1894	Yorkshire	Lancashire, Midland Counties, Somerset
1895	Yorkshire	Cumberland, Devon, Midland Counties

=== 1896-1983 ===
Year	Winners	Home team	Score	Away team	Venue	Attendance/Notes
1896	Yorkshire	Surrey	4-16	Yorkshire	Athletic Ground, Richmond	
1897	Kent	Cumberland	3-9	Kent	Carlisle	
1898	Northumberland	Midland Counties	3-24	Northumberland	Coventry	
1899	Devon	Northumberland	0-5	Devon	Jesmond, Newcastle	6,000
1900	Durham County	Devon	3–11	Durham County	Exeter	10,000-13,000
1901	Devon	Durham County	3-14	Devon	Victoria Park (Hartlepool)	
1902	Durham County	Gloucestershire	3-9	Durham County	Kingsholm Stadium, Gloucester	6,000
1903	Durham County	Durham County	4-3	Kent	Victoria Park (Hartlepool)	
1904	Kent	Kent	8-6	Durham County	Blackheath	
1905	Durham County	Durham County	9-8	Middlesex	Victoria Park (Hartlepool)	
1906	Devon	Devon	16-3	Durham County	Exeter	12,000
1907	Title shared after replay drawn	Durham County	3-3	Devon	Victoria Park (Hartlepool)	
1907	Title shared after replay drawn	Devon	0-0	Durham County	Exeter	Replay
1908	Cornwall	Cornwall	17-3	Durham County	Redruth	
1909	Durham County	Durham County	12-0	Cornwall	Old Friarage, Hartlepool	
1910	Gloucestershire	Gloucestershire	23-0	Yorkshire	Kingsholm Stadium, Gloucester	10,000
1911	Devon	Yorkshire	3-12	Devon	Clarence Cricket and Football Ground, Kirkstall	8,000
1912	Devon	Devon	29-0	Northumberland	Rectory Ground, Devonport	12,000
1913	Gloucestershire	Cumberland	3-14	Gloucestershire	Carlisle	10,000
1914	Midland Counties	Midland Counties	22-5	Durham County	Welford Road Stadium, Leicester	
1915-19	Competition suspended for WWI					
1920	Gloucestershire	Yorkshire	3-27	Gloucestershire	Lidget Green, Bradford	8,000
1921	Gloucestershire	Gloucestershire	31-4	Leicestershire	Kingsholm, Gloucester	10,701
1922	Gloucestershire	North Midlands	0-19	Gloucestershire	Villa Park, Birmingham	
1923	Somerset	Somerset	8-6	Leicestershire	Bridgwater Albion ground	10,000
1924	Cumberland	Cumberland	14-3	Kent	Carlisle	
1925	Leicestershire	Gloucestershire	6-14	Leicestershire	Memorial Ground, Bristol	
1926	Yorkshire	Yorkshire	15-14	Hampshire	Bradford	
1927	Kent	Kent	22-12	Leicestershire	Rectory Field, Blackheath	
1928	Yorkshire	Yorkshire	12–8	Cornwall	Lidget Green, Bradford	
1929	Middlesex	Middlesex	8-8	Lancashire	Twickenham	12,000
1929	Middlesex	Lancashire	8-9	Middlesex	St Anthony's Road, Blundellsands	8,000 Replay match
1930	Gloucestershire	Lancashire	7-13	Gloucestershire	St Anthony's Road, Blundellsands	10,000+
1931	Gloucestershire	Gloucestershire	10-9	Warwickshire	Kingsholm Stadium, Gloucester	
1932	Gloucestershire	Durham County	3-9	Gloucestershire	Blaydon-on-Tyne	12,000
1933	Hampshire	Hampshire	18-7	Lancashire	Dean Court, Boscombe	
1934	East Midlands	East Midlands	10-0	Gloucestershire	Franklin's Gardens, Northampton	
1935	Lancashire	Somerset	0-14	Lancashire	Recreation Ground (Bath)	
1936	Hampshire	Northumberland	6-13	Hampshire	Gosforth	
1937	Gloucestershire	Gloucestershire	5-0	East Midlands	Bristol	
1938	Lancashire	Lancashire	24-12	Surrey	St Anthony's Road, Blundellsands	
1939	Warwickshire	Somerset	3-8	Warwickshire	Weston-super-Mare	
1940-46	Competition suspended for World War II					
1947	Lancashire	Lancashire	8-8	Gloucestershire	St Anthony's Road, Blundellsands	5,000
1947	Lancashire	Gloucestershire	3-14	Lancashire	Kingsholm Stadium, Gloucester	20,000 Replay match
1948	Lancashire	Eastern Counties	0-5	Lancashire	University Ground, Cambridge	
1949	Lancashire	Lancashire	9-3	Gloucestershire	St Anthony's Road, Blundellsands	
1950	Cheshire	Cheshire	5-0	East Midlands	Upper Park, Birkenhead Park	
1951	East Midlands	East Midlands	10-0	Middlesex	Franklin's Gardens, Northampton	
1952	Middlesex	Middlesex	9-6	Lancashire	Twickenham	
1953	Yorkshire	Yorkshire	11-3	East Midlands	Bradford	
1954	Middlesex	Lancashire	6-24	Middlesex	St Anthony's Road, Blundellsands	12,000
1955	Lancashire	Middlesex	8-14	Lancashire	Twickenham	
1956	Middlesex	Middlesex	13-9	Devon	Twickenham	
1957	Devon	Devon	12-3	Yorkshire	Home Park, Plymouth	
1958	Warwickshire	Warwickshire	16-8	Cornwall	Coundon Road, Coventry	
1959	Warwickshire	Gloucestershire	9-14	Warwickshire	Memorial Ground, Bristol	
1960	Warwickshire	Warwickshire	9-6	Surrey	Coundon Road, Coventry	
1961	Cheshire	Devon	0-0	Cheshire	Home Park, Plymouth	
1961	Cheshire	Cheshire	5-3	Devon	Upper Park, Birkenhead Park	Replay match
1962	Warwickshire	Hampshire	6-11	Warwickshire	Twickenham	
1963	Warwickshire	Warwickshire	13-10	Yorkshire	Coundon Road, Coventry	
1964	Warwickshire	Warwickshire	8-6	Lancashire	Coundon Road, Coventry	
1965	Warwickshire	Durham County	9-15	Warwickshire	New Friarage, Hartlepool	
1966	Middlesex	Lancashire	0-6	Middlesex	St Anthony's Road, Blundellsands	
1967	Title shared after replay drawn	Surrey	14-14	Durham County	Twickenham	
1967	Title shared after replay drawn	Durham County	0-0	Surrey	Hartlepool	
1968	Middlesex	Middlesex	9-6	Warwickshire	Twickenham	
1969	Lancashire	Cornwall	9-11	Lancashire	Recreation Ground, Redruth	23-25,000 (estimated)
1970	Staffordshire	Staffordshire	11-9	Gloucestershire	Peel Croft, Burton-on-Trent	
1971	Surrey	Gloucestershire	3-14	Surrey	Kingsholm Stadium, Gloucester	
1972	Gloucestershire	Warwickshire	6-11	Gloucestershire	Coundon Road, Coventry	
1973	Lancashire	Gloucestershire	12-17	Lancashire	Memorial Ground, Bristol	
1974	Gloucestershire	Lancashire	12-22	Gloucestershire	St Anthony's Road, Blundellsands	
1975	Gloucestershire	Gloucestershire	13-9	Eastern Counties	Kingsholm Stadium, Gloucester	
1976	Gloucestershire	Middlesex	9-24	Gloucestershire	Richmond Athletic Ground	
1977	Lancashire	Lancashire	17-6	Middlesex	St Anthony's Road, Blundellsands	
1978	North Midlands	North Midlands	10-7	Gloucestershire	The Reddings, Moseley	
1979	Middlesex	Middlesex	19-6	Northumberland	Twickenham	
1980	Lancashire	Lancashire	21-15	Gloucestershire	Powderhouse Lane, Vale of Lune	10,000 (estimated)
1981	Northumberland	Gloucestershire	6-15	Northumberland	Kingsholm Stadium, Gloucester	
1982	Lancashire	North Midlands	3-7	Lancashire	The Reddings, Moseley	
1983	Gloucestershire	Gloucestershire	19-7	Yorkshire	Memorial Ground, Bristol	

=== 1984-present ===
Since 1984 all Championship finals have been played at Twickenham .

Year	Winners	Score	Runners up	Attendance/Notes
1984	Gloucestershire	36-18	Somerset	
1985	Middlesex	12-9	Notts, Lincs & Derby	
1986	Warwickshire	16-6	Kent	
1987	Yorkshire	22-11	Middlesex	10,000
1988	Lancashire	23-18	Warwickshire	2,000
1989	Durham County	13-9	Cornwall	27,500
1990	Lancashire	32-9	Middlesex	7,000
1991	Cornwall	29-20	Yorkshire	AET, 56,000
1992	Lancashire	9-6	Cornwall	50,000
1993	Lancashire	9-6	Yorkshire	18,700
1994	Yorkshire	26-3	Durham County	16,000
1995	Warwickshire	15-9	Northumberland	6,000
1996	Gloucestershire	17-13	Warwickshire	7,750
1997	Cumbria	21-13	Somerset	8,150
1998	Cheshire	21-14	Cornwall	35,250
1999	Cornwall	25-15	Gloucestershire	25,000
2000	Yorkshire	16-9	Devon	4,000
2001	Yorkshire	47-19	Cornwall	Challenge match, 4,000
2002	Gloucestershire	26-23	Cheshire	
2003	Lancashire	24-18	Gloucestershire	1,000
2004	Devon	43-14	Gloucestershire	
2005	Devon	22-16	Lancashire	
2006	Lancashire	32-26	Devon	
2007	Devon	27-6	Lancashire	
2008	Yorkshire	33-13	Devon	
2009	Lancashire	32-18	Gloucestershire	
2010	Lancashire	36-6	Gloucestershire	
2011	Lancashire	32-23	Hertfordshire	
2012	Hertfordshire	38-20	Lancashire	
2013	Lancashire	35-26	Cornwall	20,000
2014	Lancashire	36-26	Cornwall	4,000
2015	Cornwall	18-13	Lancashire	1,500
2016	Cornwall	35-13	Cheshire	3,000
2017	Lancashire	19-8	Cornwall	7,000
2018	Lancashire	31-16	Hertfordshire	
2019	Cornwall	14-12	Cheshire	3,500
2020-2021	No Competition due to COVID-19 pandemic in the United Kingdom			
2022	Cornwall	37-24	Cheshire	
2023	Kent	39-37	Lancashire	
2024	Kent	31-30	Yorkshire	
2025	Kent	39-32	Yorkshire	

== Championships by county ==
Correct as of 2024

County	Outright	Shared	Total	Runners-up	Last won
Cheshire	3		3	3	1998
Cornwall	7		7	9	2022
Cumberland	1		1	2	1924
Cumbria	1		1	0	1997
Devon	9	1	10	6	2007
Durham County	6	2	8	8	1989
East Midlands	2		2	3	1951
Eastern Counties	0		0	2	
Gloucestershire	17		17	16	2002
Hampshire	2		2	2	1936
Hertfordshire	1		1	1	2012
Kent	6		6	3	2025
Lancashire	25		25	10	2018
Leicestershire	1		1	3	1925
Middlesex	8		8	7	1985
Midland Counties	1		1	1	1914
North Midlands	1		1	2	1978
Northumberland	2		2	5	1981
Notts, Lincs & Derby	0		0	1	
Somerset	1		1	4	1923
Staffordshire	1		1	0	1970
Surrey	1	1	2	3	1971
Warwickshire	10		10	5	1995
Yorkshire	15		15	10	2008

Cumbria, a 1974 amalgamation of the former counties of Cumberland, Westmorland and the Furness part of Lancashire, is shown separately from Cumberland and Lancashire.

Eastern Counties and Notts, Lincs & Derby have reached the final, but have never won the championship.

Gloucestershire are the only county to have completed a "hat-trick of hat-trick" of county titles: this was achieved in 1920–1922, 1930-1932 and 1974-1976.

John Fidler, former Gloucester, Gloucestershire and England lock forward, holds the record for the most County Championship Final appearances, nine in all, from 1971 to 1984.
