= 2000–01 Rugby Union County Championship =

English rugby union competition

2000–2001 Tetley's Bitter County Championship
- Countries: England
- Champions: Yorkshire (14th title)
- Runners-up: Cornwall

The 2000–01 Tetley's Bitter Rugby Union County Championship was the 101st edition of England's County Championship rugby union club competition.

Yorkshire won their 14th title by defeating Cornwall in the final.

The competition had been devastated by the cancelling of fixtures due to flooding in 2000 and a foot-and-mouth disease outbreak in 2001, so therefore the two previous years' winners Yorkshire and Cornwall met in a challenge match to decide the Championship.

== Final ==
26 May 2001

| Yorkshire | 47–19 | Cornwall |
| Try: Dixon, penalty try, Kirkby 2, Scarbrough, Shepherd, Verity; Con: Liley (6) | | Try: Hendy; Con: Larkins; Pen: Larkins (4) |

Twickenham
Attendance: 4,000
Referee: D Pearson (Northumberland)

| Danny Scarbrough |
| Stuart Dixon |
| Jon Shepherd |
| Summers |
| Mark Kirkby |
| Rob Liley |
| Dave Scully |
| Simon Bunting |
| John Lawn (capt) |
| Rod Latham |
| Cook |
| Manuel |
| Mark Sowerby |
| Hedley Verity |
| Berke |
Replacements:
| Wainwright (for Liley 72min) |
| Andy Brown (for Scully 48min) |

| James Hawken |
| Steve Larkins |
| Andy Hymans |
| Shane Kirman |
| Adryan Winnan |
| James Hendy |
| Ian Sanders (capt) |
| Neil Douch |
| Neil Clark |
| Nick Croker |
| Lee Soper |
| S O'Sullivan |
| Ali Durant |
| Ian Boase |
| Laka Waqinivere |
Replacements:
| Hobson (for Croker 51min) |
| Joynt (for O'Sullivan 49min) |
Coach:
| Barry Trevaskis |

== See also ==
- English rugby union system
- Rugby union in England
