= 2006–07 Rugby Union County Championship =

English rugby union competition

2006–2007 Bill Beaumont Cup County Championship
- Countries: England
- Champions: Devon (10th title)
- Runners-up: Lancashire

The 2006–07 Bill Beaumont Cup (Rugby Union County Championship) was the 107th edition of England's County Championship rugby union club competition.

Devon won their 10th title after defeating Lancashire in the final.

The Championship was renamed the Bill Beaumont Cup in honour of Bill Beaumont.

== Final ==
28 May 2007

Devon	27–6	Lancashire
Try: Fabian, Kimberley, Van Eyk; Con: Van Eyk (3); Pen: Van Eyk (2)		Pen: Nutt (2)

Twickenham
Referee: Mark Wilson

Jon Fabian	Cornish All Blacks
Paul Scheres	Barnstaple
Arran Cruickshanks	Plymouth Albion
Ross Allan	Plymouth Albion
Tom Bedford	Exeter Chiefs
Regardt Van Eyk	Plymouth Albion
Matt Newman	Plymouth Albion
Tim Mathias	Plymouth Albion
James Owen	Plymouth Albion
Wayne Reed	Cornish All Blacks
Brett Luxton	Cornish All Blacks
Ed King	Plymouth Albion
Kyle Marriott	Lydney
Dave Kimberley	Cornish All Blacks
Chris Lowrie (capt)	Plymouth Albion
Replacements:
Gareth Evans	Plymouth Albion
Barrie-John Chapman	Cornish All Blacks
Ben Rowntree	Plymouth Albion
Richard Bolt	Cornish All Blacks
Pat Sykes	Canterbury
Darren Ritchie	Plymouth Albion
Graham Dawe	Plymouth Albion
Coach:
Graham Dawe

Neil Hunter	Waterloo
Nick Royle	Fylde
Chris Briers	Sedgley Park
Jason Duffy	Sedgley Park
Neil Kerfoot	Waterloo
Steve Nutt	Waterloo
Dave McCormack (capt)	Bradford & Bingley
Martin Halsall	Sedgley Park
Peter Ince	Waterloo
Petrus du Plessis	Sedgley Park
Louis McGowan	Rotherham
Gareth Rawlings	Manchester
Glynn Dewhurst	Preston Grasshoppers
Dave Wilks	Nottingham
Juan Crous	Preston Grasshoppers
Replacements:
Nick Flynn	Manchester
Tom Lavelle	Fylde
Chris Planchant	Waterloo
Dan Palmer	Waterloo
Darren Wilson	Preston Grasshoppers
Freeman Payne	Waterloo
Paul Bailey	Preston Grasshoppers
Coach:

== See also ==
- English rugby union system
- Rugby union in England
