= 1890–91 Rugby Union County Championship =

English rugby union competition

1890–91 County Championship
- Countries: England
- Champions: Lancashire (1st title)

The 1890–91 Rugby Union County Championship was the third edition of England's premier rugby union club competition at the time.

Lancashire won the competition for the first time, winning all ten of their county fixtures during the season, which included beating the three teams declared champions of their respective divisional groups.

== Draw and Results ==
=== Group Winners ===
Division	Winners
South Western	Gloucestershire
South Eastern	Surrey
North Western	Lancashire
North Eastern	Yorkshire

=== Championship Series ===
Date	Venue	Team One	Team Two	Score
Nov 29	Whalley Range, Manchester	Lancashire	Yorkshire	8-2
Feb 16	Whalley Range, Manchester	Lancashire	Surrey	19-0
Mar 14	Whalley Range, Manchester	Lancashire	Gloucestershire	16-0

Squad

- M Atkinson (Wigan)
- John Berry (Tyldesley)
- T Brayshaw (Wigan)
- Walter Bumby (Swinton)
- Tom Coop (Leigh)
- T Craven (Salford)
- W Cross (St Helens)
- E H Flower (Broughton)
- Dai Gwynne (Oldham)
- Tom Kent (Salford)
- James Holt Marsh (Swinton)
- William McCutcheon (Oldham)
- James Pyke (St Helens Recreation RLFC)
- C Rome (Broughton)
- T Rothwell (Swinton)
- J Strang (Liverpool)
- Jim Valentine (Swinton)
- T Whittaker (Manchester)
- R P Wilson (Liverpool Old Boys)

== See also ==
- English rugby union system
- Rugby union in England
