= 1922–23 Rugby Union County Championship =

English rugby union competition

1922–23 County Championship
- Countries: England
- Champions: Somerset (1st title)
- Runners-up: Leicestershire

The 1922–23 Rugby Union County Championship was the 30th edition of England's premier rugby union club competition at the time.

Somerset won the competition for the first time after defeating Leicestershire in the final.

== Semifinals ==
Date	Venue	Team one	Team two	Score
		Somerset	Kent	12-5

== Final ==
14 April 1923

Somerset	8–6	Leicestershire
Try: Jervis, Meine; Con: Gaisford		Try: Smallwood, Burton

Bridgwater Albion ground
Attendance: 10,000
Referee: T H Vile (Newport)

W F Gaisford	Clifton & St Bartholomews's
Dr F Meine	Edinburgh University & Bath
E Hammett	Blackheath
A Thomson	Navy & Wellington
S Considine	Bath
E Esbester	Clifton
J Jarvis (capt)	Bridgwater
H Vowles	Bath
A J Spriggs	Bridgwater
J Reed	Bridgwater
P Lewis	Bridgwater
W Sheppard	Bath
C Mannings	Bath
L Bisgrove	Bath
F Spriggs	Blackheath

L Sambrook	Leicester
C Burton	Nottingham
A Smallwood	Leicester
N Coates	Leicester
Percy Lawrie	Leicester
Teddy Haselmere	Leicester
Tim Taylor	Leicester
G German	Leicester
G Ward	Leicester
J E Davies	Leicester
C Cross	Leicester
Doug Norman	Leicester
N Thoreloe	Leicester
H Sharratt	Leicester
H Grierson	Rosslyn Park

== See also ==
- English rugby union system
- Rugby union in England
