= Mike Davis (rugby union) =

England rugby union player and coach (1942–2022)

- Born: Alec Michael Davis; 23 January 1942 Lichfield, Staffordshire, England
- Died: 10 May 2022 (aged 80)
- Occupation: Schoolmaster

Rugby union career
- Position: Lock
Senior career
Years	Team	Apps	(Points)
- Sherborne RFC
- Harlequin F.C.
International career
Years	Team	Apps	(Points)
1963-70	England	16	(0)
Coaching career
- Years: Team
- 1979-83: England

Alec Michael Davis (23 January 1942 – 10 May 2022) was an England rugby union player and head coach. He played rugby as a lock in his youth for Torquay Athletic RFC and represented the county of Devon before being selected for his first England cap in 1963. He remained in rugby all the rest of his life, continuing to coach youth and senior teams in his home town of Sherborne.

== Early life and rugby career ==
Davis was born in Lichfield and went to Torquay Boys' Grammar School before training as a teacher at St Luke's College, Exeter, where he was studying when he was first selected for the England team in 1963. He also studied at the Royal Naval College in Dartmouth and HMS Raleigh. In club rugby he played for the Devonport Services R.F.C., Harlequins and the Combined Services team. He played for the Devon and Staffordshire county rugby teams and was captain when Staffordshire won the 1969–70 Rugby Union County Championship. He also played water polo and basketball.

== International career ==
=== Player ===
His arrival on the international scene as a player was significant enough that he was profiled in the December 1963 issue of Rugby World magazine.

He was a teacher and coach at Sherborne School (1974–2002) where, alongside Phil Jones between 1975 and 1978, he coached the school to four unbeaten seasons with 35 out of 35 school matches being won. Only a handful of games were lost during a coaching partnership which spanned six seasons.

=== Coach ===
He was appointed head coach of England for the 1979/80 season, the only England senior coach ever appointed on the merits of their achievements as a school coach rather than a club coach. His international coaching career spanned four seasons to the end of the 1982/83 season. In his first season as coach England won the Grand Slam in the 1980 Five Nations Championship.

Mike Davis England playing and coaching record
Record as a	Dates from – to	played	won	drawn	lost	win percentage
Player	19 January 1963 – 21 March 1970	16	5	2	9	31.25%
Coach	24 November 1979 – 19 March 1983	20	10	3	7	50.00%

== School and club coach ==
He coached England in a strictly amateur era and as such he continued to teach and coach at Sherborne School. With the formation of Sherborne RFC in the early 1980s he was soon enlisted to help raise the standard of play at this burgeoning club and he coached a variety of sides within the Senior and Junior section on-and-off over a period of thirty years.

== Personal life ==
Davis died in May 2022, at the age of 80.

Preceded by Peter Colston	English national rugby coach 1979-1983	Succeeded by Dick Greenwood
