= 1902–03 Rugby Union County Championship =

English rugby union competition

1902–03 County Championship
- Countries: England
- Champions: Durham (3rd title)
- Runners-up: Kent

The 1902–03 Rugby Union County Championship was the 15th edition of England's premier rugby union club competition at the time.

Durham won the competition for the third time defeating Kent in the final.

== Final ==
4 April 1903

Durham	4-3	Kent
Drop: Jack Taylor		Try: 1 x try

Victoria Park (Hartlepool)

Bob Poole (capt)	Hartlepool Old Boys
Edgar Elliot	Sunderland
Norman Cox	Sunderland
Jack Taylor	West Hartlepool
Phil Clarkson	Sunderland
E J Joicey	Rockliff
Jack Knaggs	Hartlepool Rovers
Bob Bradley	West Hartlepool
Jim Auton	West Hartlepool
Joe Booth	West Hartlepool
Jimmy Duthie	West Hartlepool
George Summerscale	Durham City
T Bell	Tudhoe
George Carter	Hartlepool Rovers
L Hopper	Westoe

J G Gibson	London Scottish
William Llewellyn	London Welsh
Reg Skrimshire	Blackheath
Arthur O'Brien	Guy's Hospital
Pat McEvedy	Guy's Hospital
Ted Dillon	Harlequins
A Brown	Blackheath
T Balkwill	Catford Bridge
Bernard Charles Hartley (capt)	Blackheath
R. F. Hobbs	Blackheath
Arthur Turner	Blackheath
Charles Joseph Newbold	Blackheath
William Cave	Blackheath & Cambridge University
Norman Spicer	Old Leysians & Cambridge University
R. H. Fox	Harlequins

== See also ==
- English rugby union system
- Rugby union in England
