= 1921–22 Rugby Union County Championship =

English rugby union competition

1921–22 County Championship
- Countries: England
- Champions: Gloucestershire (5th title)
- Runners-up: North Midlands

The 1921–22 Rugby Union County Championship was the 29th edition of England's premier rugby union club competition at the time.

Gloucestershire won the competition for the fifth time and third in succession after defeating North Midlands in the final.

== Semifinals ==
Date	Venue	Team one	Team two	Score
		North Midlands	Cheshire	
11 Jan	London	Surrey	Gloucestershire	8-8
16 Feb	(replay) Kingsholm	Gloucestershire	Surrey	30-0

== Final ==
9 March 1922

North Midlands	0–19	Gloucestershire
		Try: Spoors, Ayliffe, Dix; Con: Millington; Pen: Pickles

Villa Park, Birmingham
Attendance: 7,000

Reg Pickles (capt)	Bristol
H Feltham	Bristol
Stanley Cook	Cambridge University
Len Corbett	Bristol
T Spoors	Bristol
Tom Millington	Gloucester
William 'Father' Dix	Gloucester
George Halford	Gloucester
Sid Smart	Gloucester
Tom Voyce	Gloucester
Frank Ayliffe	Gloucester
A Hall	Gloucester
A Hore	Bristol
Major Roderick	Gloucester
P J Williams	Bristol

E H Edwards	Wolverhampton
A P Wayte	Birmingham University
R Baker	Birmingham University
H C Price	Old Edwardians
E Foster	Moseley
A H Cross	Aston Old Edwardians
L Barratt	Aston Old Edwardians
H W Hill	Moseley
A Woodward (capt)	Moseley
P S Jenkins	Birmingham
D B Drummond	Old Edwardians
A C Tomlinson	Burton
H E Markwick	Aston Old Edwardians
J D Browne	Aston Old Edwardians
W E Wilkinson	Aston Old Edwardians

== See also ==
- English rugby union system
- Rugby union in England
