= 1988–89 Rugby Union County Championship =

English rugby union competition

1988–89 Toshiba County Championship
- Countries: England
- Champions: Durham County (8th title)
- Runners-up: Cornwall

The 1988–89 Toshiba Rugby Union County Championship was the 89th edition of England's County Championship rugby union club competition.

Durham County won their eighth title after defeating Cornwall in the final.

The competition celebrated 100 years and despite the fact that it no longer held the same prestige as before a record crowd of 27,500 (the majority from Cornwall) turned up to watch the final at Twickenham Stadium.

== Semi finals ==
Date	Venue	Team One	Team Two	Score
21 Jan	Redruth	Cornwall	Warwickshire	13-10
21 Jan	Blackheath	Kent	Durham	6-10

== Final ==
1 April 1989

Durham County	13–9	Cornwall
Try: Fenwick; Pen: Bland (3)		Pen: Champion (3)

Twickenham
Attendance: 27,500
Referee: Fred Howard (Liverpool)

15	J Bland (capt)	Durham City
14	O Evans	West Hartlepool
13	Phil de Glanville	Durham University
12	M Boyd	West Hartlepool
11	D Cooke	West Hartlepool
10	J Stabler	West Hartlepool
9	S Havery	Gateshead Fell
1	G Naisbitt	Stockton
2	M A Fenwick	Durham City
3	M Douthwaite	Stockton
4	J Dixon	West Hartlepool
5	J Howe	Sale
6	A R Harle	Gosforth
7	A Brown	Stockton
8	B Dixon	Stockton
Replacements: (not used)
16	G Spearman	Blaydon
17	M Boyd	West Hartlepool
18	S Kirkup	Durham City
19	P Joyce	Durham City
20	G A Kell	Gateshead Fell
21	D Mitchell	West Hartlepool

15	Chris Alcock	Camborne
14	Barry Trevaskis	Bath
13	Grant Champion (capt)	Devon & Cornwall Police & Truro
12	S Rogers	Camborne
11	David Weeks	Camborne
10	Alan Buzza	Cambridge University & Redruth
9	D Rule	Camborne
1	John May	Redruth
2	Graham Dawe	Bath
3	Richard Keast	Redruth
4	Andy Reed	Camborne
5	A Cook	Camborne
6	Glyn Williams	Redruth
7	Adrian Bick	Bath
8	Martin Haag	Bath
Replacements: (not used)
16	Tony Mead	Devon & Cornwall Police
17	D Chapman	Camborne
18	Richard Nancekivell	Launceston
19	B Andrew	Camborne
20	S Matavesi	Camborne
21	A Curtis	Redruth

== See also ==
- English rugby union system
- Rugby union in England
