= 1987–88 Rugby Union County Championship =

English rugby union competition

1987–88 Toshiba County Championship
- Countries: England
- Champions: Lancashire (13th title)
- Runners-up: Warwickshire

The 1987–88 Toshiba Rugby Union County Championship was the 88th edition of England's County Championship rugby union club competition.

Lancashire won their 13th title after defeating Warwickshire in the final.

The final only attracted 2,000 spectators at Twickenham Stadium which was blamed on the fact that the Grand National was taking place at the same time. However a more logical explanation was the introduction of the 1987–88 Courage League which provided the sport with its first official league table after replacing the former Merit table. Consequently clubs, players and fans now prioritised the Courage League over the County Championship.

== Semi finals ==
Date	Venue	Team One	Team Two	Score
12 Mar	Vale of Lune	Lancashire	Gloucestershire	11-6
13 Mar	Coundon Road	Warwickshire	Middlesex	31-19

== Final ==
9 April 1988

Lancashire	23–18	Warwickshire
Try: Hanavan, O'Brien, Ainscough, Aitchison; Con: Ainscough (2); Pen: Aisncough		Try: Hall, Johnson; Con: Thomas (2); Pen: Thomas (2)

Twickenham
Attendance: 2,000
Referee: Roger Quittenton (London)

A Higgin	Vale of Lune
B Hanavan	Fylde
D Fell	Orrell
G Ainscough	Orrell
Nigel Heslop	Waterloo
I Aitchison	Waterloo
G Williams	Pwllheli
D O'Brien	Orrell
N Hitchen	Orrell
D Southern	Orrell
Bob Kimmins	Orrell
Wade Dooley	Fylde
D Cleary	Orrell
P Cook	Nottingham
S Gallagher	Waterloo

Steven Hall	Barkers' Butts
C Leake	Coventry
M Warr	Barkers' Butts
K Shaw	Barkers' Butts
Stuart Hall	Coventry
M Lakey	Coventry
S Thomas	Coventry
L Johnson	Coventry
A Farrington	Coventry
S Wickes	Coventry
A Gulliver	Coventry
P Bowman	Rugby
P Thomas	Coventry
R Travers	Coventry
K Hickey	Moseley

== See also ==
- English rugby union system
- Rugby union in England
