= 1919–20 Rugby Union County Championship =

English rugby union competition

1919–20 County Championship
- Countries: England
- Champions: Gloucestershire (3rd title)
- Runners-up: Yorkshire

The 1913–14 Rugby Union County Championship was the 27th edition of England's premier rugby union club competition at the time.

Gloucestershire won the competition for the third time defeating Yorkshire in the final.

== Semifinals ==
Date	Venue	Team one	Team two	Score
		Gloucestershire	East Midlands	16-11

== Final ==
17 April 1920

Yorkshire	3–27	Gloucestershire
Try: Netherwood		Try: Webb, Pickles, Corbett, Ayliffe; Con: x3

Lidget Green, Bradford
Attendance: 8,000
Referee: F C Potter Irwin

A Metcalfe	Skipton
H S Netherwood	Huddersfield Old Boys
O E H Leslie	Sheffield
H B Simpson	Headingley
C H Holliday	Bradford
Edward Myers	Bradford
A S Hamilton	Headingley
F Trenham (capt)	Otley
J Hilton	Headingley
H J White	Headingley
H H de B Monk	Bradford
A Knight	Otley
Corporal C Hyland	Army
Dr J D McDougall	Wakefield
J J G Greenwood	Harrogate Old Boys

B Davey	Cheltenham
Fred Webb	Gloucester
Reg Pickles	Bristol
Len Corbett	Bristol
Arthur Hudson (capt)	Gloucester
Tom Millington	Gloucester
William 'Father' Dix	Gloucester
George Halford	Gloucester
Sid Smart	Gloucester
F W Ward	Gloucester
Frank Ayliffe	Gloucester
Arthur 'Tart' Hall	Gloucester
Sam Tucker	Bristol
M Shaw	Bristol
J Broughton	Bristol

== See also ==
- English rugby union system
- Rugby union in England
