= 2007–08 Rugby Union County Championship =

English county rugby union competition

2007–2008 Bill Beaumont Cup County Championship
- Countries: England
- Champions: Yorkshire (15th title)
- Runners-up: Devon

The 2007–08 Bill Beaumont Cup (Rugby Union County Championship) was the 108th edition of England's County Championship rugby union club competition.

Yorkshire won their 15th title after defeating Devon in the final.

== Final ==
31 May 2008

Yorkshire	33–13	Devon
Try: Parsons (2), Rock, Kitching; Con: Kitching (2); Pen: Kitching (3)		Try: Penalty try Con: Scott; Pen: Hawkes (2)

Twickenham
Referee: Rowan Kitt

Adam Whaites	Wharfedale
Steve Parsons	Otley
Tom Rock	Leeds Carnegie
Kyle Dench	Otley
Robin Kitching	Otley
Richard Wainwright	Manchester
David McCormack	Otley
Ryan Wederell	Otley
Scott Plevey	Doncaster Knights
James Armitage	Beverley
Dan Cook (capt)	Hull
Richard Hill	Hull Ionians
Dan Hyde	Otley
Neil Spence	Bradford & Bingley
Max Lewis	Leeds Carnegie
Replacements:
Peter Wright	Middlesbrough
Andrew Baggett	Wharfedale
Paul Turner	Otley
Will Kay	Halifax
Matt Challinor	Morley
Matt Stockdale	Otley
David Worrall	Beverley
Coach:
Bob Hood

Ben Scott	Unattached
Tom Bedford	Exeter Chiefs
Keni Fisilau	Plymouth Albion
Patrick Sykes	Canterbury
Liam Gibson	Plymouth Albion
Daniel Hawkes	Plymouth Albion
Matt Newman	Plymouth Albion
Wayne Reed	Cornish All Blacks
Stewart Pearl	Unattached
Ryan Hopkins	Plymouth Albion
Jamie Tripcony	Plymouth Albion
Edward King	Plymouth Albion
Danny Thomas	Unattached
Jake Childs	Plymouth Albion
Kyle Marriott (capt)	Plymouth Albion
Replacements:
Stephen Bennett	Unattached
Gareth Evans	Plymouth Albion
David Kimberley	Bridgwater
Richard Jenkins	Bristol
Ben Thompson	Unattached
Marc Dibble	Cornish All Blacks
Jon Marlin	Mounts Bay
Coach:
Graham Dawe

== See also ==
- English rugby union system
- Rugby union in England
