= 1950–51 Rugby Union County Championship =

English rugby union competition

1950–51 County Championship
- Countries: England
- Champions: East Midlands (2nd title)
- Runners-up: Middlesex

The 1950–51 Rugby Union County Championship was the 51st edition of England's premier rugby union club competition at the time.

East Midlands won the competition for the second time after defeating Middlesex in the final.

== Final ==
10 March 1951

East Midlands	10–0	Middlesex
Try: Macnally, Oakley; Con: Haynes (2)

Franklin's Gardens, Northampton
Referee: H A Fry (Lancashire)

T Gray	Northampton
N Bailey	Northampton
Allan Towell	Bedford
Lionel Oakley	Bedford
D Macnally	Northampton
R H Haynes	Bedford
F M Fletcher	Bedford
Ron Jacobs	Northampton
Trevor Smith	Northampton
J H Whiting	Northampton
W R Hamp	Northampton
John Bance	Bedford
G Jenkins	Bedford
R C Hawkes	Northampton
Don White (capt)	Northampton

J D Marshall	London Welsh
Ted Woodward	Wasps
Albert Agar	Lloyds Bank
Brian Boobbyer	Rosslyn Park & Oxford U
G H Sullivan	St Mary's Hospital
Nim Hall (capt)	Richmond
Patrick Sykes	Wasps
A G C Jones	Old Paulines & Army
John Steeds	Saracens
J F Herbert	Wasps
D W Malcolm	Wasps
D C Shields	Middlesex Hospital
D Gilbert-Smith	London Scottish
A A Grimsdell	Harlequins
Dyson Wilson	Metropolitan Police

== See also ==
- English rugby union system
- Rugby union in England
