= 2002–03 Rugby Union County Championship =

English rugby union competition

2002–2003 Tetley's Bitter County Championship
- Countries: England
- Champions: Lancashire (17th title)
- Runners-up: Gloucestershire

The 2002–03 Tetley's Bitter Rugby Union County Championship was the 103rd edition of England's County Championship rugby union club competition.

Lancashire won their 17th title after defeating Gloucestershire in the final.

== Final ==
24 May 2003

Lancashire	24–18	Gloucestershire
Try: Kerfoot (2), Lund, Viney; Con: Glynn (2)		Try: Martin, Turoa; Con: Woodrow; Pen: Woodrow (2)

Twickenham
Attendance: 1,000
Referee: David Grashoff

15	Chris Glynn	Waterloo
14	Neil Kerfoot	Orrell
13	Paul Bailey	Preston
12	Sean Casey	Liverpool St Helens
11	Jay Van Deventer	Waterloo
10	Rob Hitchmough	Waterloo
9	Dave McCormack	Sedgley Park
1	Martin O'Keefe	Orrell
2	Mike Scott	Fylde
3	Alan Yates	Fylde
4	Paul Arnold	Sedgley Park
5	Erik Lund	Fylde
6	Richard Senior	Sedgley Park
7	Dave Wilkes	Manchester
8	Tim Fourie (capt)	Sedgley Park
Replacements:
	Oliver Viney	Preston

1	Tony Windo	Worcester
2	Paul Price	Lydney
3	George Davis	Worcester
4	Andy Geary	Gloucester Old Boys
5	James Stickland	Old Patesians
6	Regan Turoa	Lydney
7	Nathan Carter	Birmingham & Solihull
8	Julian Horrobin	Coventry
9	Paul Knight	Birmingham & Solihull
10	Mark Woodrow	Dings Crusaders
11	Graham Robertson	St Mary's Old Boys
12	Simon Martin	Coventry
13	Ed Crampton	Old Patesians
14	Ben Matthews	Old Patesians
15	David Knight	Birmingham & Solihull
Replacements:
16	Iain Johnson	Dings Crusaders
17	Jon Martin	Newbury
18	Tony Down	Thornbury
19	Virgil Hartland	Stourbridge
20	Ian Gibbons	Henley
21	Rob James	Cinderford
22	Adam Tarplee	Stroud

== See also ==
- English rugby union system
- Rugby union in England
