= 2008–09 Rugby Union County Championship =

English rugby union competition

2008–2009 Bill Beaumont Cup County Championship
- Countries: England
- Champions: Lancashire (19th title)
- Runners-up: Gloucestershire

The 2008–09 Bill Beaumont Cup (Rugby Union County Championship) was the 109th edition of England's County Championship rugby union club competition.

Lancashire won their 19th title after defeating Gloucestershire in the final.

== Final ==
30 May 2009

Lancashire	32–18	Gloucestershire
Try: Crous, Royle, Riley; Con: Davies; Pen: Davies (5)		Try: Holder, Jenkins; Con: Woodrow; Pen: Woodrow (2)

Twickenham

15	Stephen Nutt (capt)	Fylde
14	Nick Royle	Fylde
13	Mark Turner	Caldy
12	Matthew Riley	Sedgley Tigers
11	Oliver Brennand	Fylde
10	Alex Davies	Plymouth Albion
9	Ryan de La Harpe	West Park
1	Robert O'Donnell	Manchester
2	David Ward	Manchester
3	Petrus Du Plessis	Sedgley Tigers
4	Louis McGowan	Rotherham Titans
5	Sam Beaumont	Fylde
6	Juan Crous	Sedgley Tigers
7	Daniel Baines	Macclesfield
8	Sebastian Moss	Manchester
Replacements:
16	Kieran Brookes	Fylde
17	Charlie Baleirara	West Park
18	Andrew Dockray	Preston Grasshoppers
19	Garth Dew	Manchester
20	Matthew Williams	Waterloo
21	Tom Barlow	Rotherham Titans
22	Craig Aikman	Fylde
23	Russell Flynn	Preston Grasshoppers
24	Steve Collins	Rochdale

15	James Copsey	Cinderford
14	Chris Holder	Lydney
13	Jonny May	Hartpury College
12	Dewi Scourfield	Cinderford
11	Jaike Carter	Cinderford
10	Mark Woodrow	Cinderford
9	Paul Knight (capt)	Cinderford
1	Paul Price	Lydney
2	Paul Finken	Newbury
3	Ricky Davies	Birmingham & Solihull
4	Will Waldron	Hartpury College
5	Royce Cadman	Hartpury College
6	Mathew Gilbert	Hartpury College
7	Dean Jenkins	Lydney
8	Mike Panoho	Dings Crusaders
Replacements:
16	Chris Hall	Cinderford
17	Matt Long	Birmingham & Solihull
18	Dave Bufton	Dings Crusaders
19	Tim Stevenson	Cinderford
20	Jimmy Williams	Lydney
21	Chris McNeil	Cinderford
22	Sylvan Edwards	Dings Crusaders
Coach:
	Paul Williams

== See also ==
- English rugby union system
- Rugby union in England
