= 1903–04 Rugby Union County Championship =

English rugby union competition

1903–04 County Championship
- Countries: England
- Champions: Kent (2nd title)
- Runners-up: Durham

The 1903–04 Rugby Union County Championship was the 16th edition of England's premier rugby union club competition at the time. Kent won the competition for the second time defeating Durham in the final.

== Final ==
9 April 1904

Kent	8–6	Durham
Try: Morgan; Con: Taylor		Try: 2

Blackheath

J G Gibson	London Scottish
E Morgan	Guy's Hospital
Ted Dillon	Harlequins
Arthur O'Brien	Guy's Hospital
Pat McEvedy	Guy's Hospital
Robert Livesay	Blackheath
A. Brown	Blackheath
Bernard Charles Hartley (capt)	Blackheath
Basil Alexander Hill	Blackheath
Walter Rogers	Blackheath
Charles Joseph Newbold	Blackheath
William Cave	Blackheath & Cambridge Uni
Charles Scott	London Hospital & Blackheath
Frederick Jacob	Richmond & Cheltenham
S. McSaunders	Guy's Hospital

Tom Hogarth	Hartlepool Rovers
Edgar Elliot (capt)	Sunderland
Norman Cox	Sunderland
Jack Taylor	West Hartlepool
Phil Clarkson	Sunderland
E J Joicey	North Durham
Jack Knaggs	Hartlepool Rovers
Bob Bradley	West Hartlepool
Jim Auton	West Hartlepool
W Gowans	Hartlepool Old Boys
R Elliott	Durham City
George Summerscale	Durham City
S Horsley	Hartlepool Rovers
George Carter	Hartlepool Rovers
Frank Boylen	Hartlepool Rovers

== See also ==
- English rugby union system
- Rugby union in England
