= 1992–93 Rugby Union County Championship =

English rugby union competition

1992–93 ADT County Championship
- Countries: England
- Champions: Lancashire (16th title)
- Runners-up: Yorkshire

The 1992–93 ADT Security Systems Rugby Union County Championship was the 93rd edition of England's County Championship rugby union club competition.

Lancashire won their 16th title after defeating Yorkshire in the final.

The Championship was now so far behind the Courage League in terms of priorities that a decision was made to make the following season's edition only eligible to players from teams outside the top two divisions of the Courage League.

== Final ==
17 April 1993

Lancashire	9–6	Yorkshire
Pen: Ainscough (3)		Pen: Liley (2)

Twickenham
Attendance: 18,700
Referee: E Morrison (Bristol)

S Taberner	Orrell
P Hamer	Orrell
G Ainscough	Orrell
S Langford	Orrell
S Bromley	Rugby
A Handley	Waterloo
C Saverimutto	Waterloo
J Russell	Broughton Park
G French	Liverpool St Helens
Sammy Southern (capt)	Orrell
C Cusani	Orrell
N Allott	Waterloo
P Manley	Orrell
N Ashurst	Orrell
Mike Kenrick	Sale
Coach:
Des Seabrook

R Thompson	Wakefield
J Eagle	Leeds
D Edwards	Wakefield
P Johnson	Leeds
Jon Sleightholme	Wakefield
Rob Liley	Wakefield
A Crowley	Bradford & Bingley
M Vincent	Wakefield
T Garnett	Wakefield
S Rice	Otley
I Carroll	Wakefield
D Baldwin	Sale
S Tipping	Otley
P Buckton (capt)	Waterloo
C Vyvyan	Upper Wharfedale

== See also ==
- English rugby union system
- Rugby union in England
