= 1910–11 Rugby Union County Championship =

English rugby union competition

1910–11 County Championship
- Countries: England
- Champions: Devon (5th title)
- Runners-up: Yorkshire

The 1910–11 Rugby Union County Championship was the 23rd edition of England's premier rugby union club competition at the time.

Devon won the competition for the fifth time defeating Yorkshire in the final.

== Final ==
25 February 1911

Yorkshire	3–12	Devon
Try: Fisher		Try: E Thomas, T Baker, Butcher (2)

Clarence Cricket and Football Ground, Kirkstall
Attendance: 8,000
Referee: Arthur Jones (Midland Counties)

A Lambert	Skipton
J L Fisher (capt)	Hull & East Riding
F C Pyman	Cambridge University
D C Mason	Otley
K Duncan	Otley
R Harrison	Northampton
A King	Headingley
J King	Headingley
Jack Eddison	Headingley
L C Blencowe	Headingley
A L P Griffith	Harrogate
Alfred MacIlwaine	Hull & East Riding
C Tosney	Skipton
A Clarke	Skipton
F Trenham	Otley

F J Lillicrap	Devonport Albion
P J Baker	Plymouth
E Thomas	Devonport Albion
W Davies	Plymouth
E G Butcher	Plymouth
Raphael Jago	Devonport Albion
A J Monk	Devonport Albion
D Hollands	Devonport Albion
E J Lee	Devonport Albion
T Hayman	Plymouth
A Lancaster	Devonport Albion
H Snell	Seaton
H W Pope	Plymouth
G Edwards	Plymouth
C Moss	Plymouth

== See also ==
- English rugby union system
- Rugby union in England
