= 1998–99 Rugby Union County Championship =

English rugby union competition

1998–99 Tetley's Bitter County Championship
- Countries: England
- Champions: Cornwall (3rd title)
- Runners-up: Gloucestershire

The 1998–99 Tetley's Bitter Rugby Union County Championship was the 99th edition of England's County Championship rugby union club competition.

Cornwall won their third title after defeating Gloucestershire in the final.

== Final ==
22 May 1999

Cornwall	24–15	Gloucestershire
Try: Tucker, Whitworth; Con: Saumi; Pen: Larkins (3), Saumi		Pen: Osborne (5)

Twickenham
Attendance: 25,000
Referee: Nigel Yates (Manchester)

Andy Birkett	Launceston
Nat Saumi	Penzance & Newlyn
Jimmy Tucker	Launceston
Colin Laity	Exeter
Steve Larkins	Redruth
Stuart Whitworth	Redruth
Mark Roderick	Penzance & Newlyn
Peter Risdon	Launceston
Neil Grigg	Launceston
John Thomas	Penzance & Newlyn
Glynn Hutchings	Launceston
Kevin Moseley	Penzance & Newlyn
Jason Atkinson	Penzance & Newlyn
Martyn Addinall	Penryn
Dean Shipton (capt)	Launceston
Replacements:
Ed Nancekivell	Launceston (for Larkins 39m)
Paul Gadsdon	Penzance & N (for Roderick 85m)
Steve Rush	Launceston (for Thomas 63m)
Lee Mruk	Penzance & N (for Hutchings 82m)
Coach:
Phil Angove

S Morgan	Gloucester
Jerry Perrins	Stroud
D Edwards	Cinderford
Lee Osborne	Lydney
Chris Dunlop	Lydney
Steve Thompson	Stroud
J Davis	Lydney
A Martin	Cinderford
Nick Nelmes (capt)	Lydney
Adey Powles	Gloucester
B Guy	Ashley Down
A Adams	Clifton
R York	Cheltenham
Adam Tarplee	Cheltenham
Mike Nicholls	Lydney
Replacements:
S Ward	Gloucester (for Thompson 61m)
P Knight	Sale (for Davis 71m)
G Williams	Lydney (for Martin 69m)
N Matthews	Matson (for Elms 81m)
Jim Roberts	Lydney (for Guy 61m)
R James	Matson (for Nicholls 77m)

== See also ==
- English rugby union system
- Rugby union in England
