= Alan Roberts (rugby union) =

England international rugby union player

Alan Roberts MC
- Full name: Alan Dixon Roberts
- Born: 5 December 1887 Newcastle-upon-Tyne, England
- Died: 1 September 1940 (aged 52) E Anglesey, England

Rugby union career
- Position: Wing
International career
Years	Team	Apps	(Points)
1911–14	England	8	(15)

Alan Dixon Roberts (5 December 1887 – 1 September 1940) was an English international rugby union player.

Born in Newcastle-upon-Tyne, Roberts played his rugby for the city's Northern Football Club. He was a Northumberland representative player and gained eight England caps as a wing three-quarter. After a two-try performance in the final trial, Roberts made his debut against Wales in a 1911 Five Nations match at Swansea, where he was again amongst the try scorers. He continued to play for England until 1914.

Roberts served as a captain with the Royal Fusiliers during World War I and in 1918 was awarded the Military Cross for showing "coolness and initiative" in leading his platoon under heavy bombardment.

== See also ==
- List of England national rugby union players
