= Mike Weston =

England international rugby union player and cricketer (1938–2023)

Michael Philip Weston (21 August 1938 – 24 December 2023) was an England international rugby union player and captain.

== Early life ==
Born on 21 August 1938, Weston was educated at Durham School. He played club rugby for Durham City and represented Durham County Cricket Club in minor counties cricket. His sons Phil Weston and Robin Weston both played first-class county cricket. Mike Weston died on 24 December 2023, at the age of 85.

== Career ==
Weston was capped twenty-nine times for England between 1960 and 1968, winning twenty-four caps as a centre and five caps as a fly-half. He scored one try and one drop goal for England. He captained England five times, leading his country in all three matches of the 1963 England rugby union tour of Australasia, and then again in the final two matches of his international career in 1968. England won one and lost four of his matches as captain. Weston was selected for the 1962 British Lions tour to South Africa, playing in all four internationals against South Africa and the 1966 British Lions tour to Australia and New Zealand where he played in the two internationals against Australia but not in any of the internationals against the All Blacks.

Sporting positions
Preceded by Richard Sharp	English National Rugby Union Captain; 1963	Succeeded by John Willcox
Preceded by Colin McFadyean	English National Rugby Union Captain; 1968	Succeeded by Dick Greenwood
