= Colin McFadyean =

British rugby union player (1943–2025)

- Born: Colin William McFadyean; 11 March 1943 Tavistock, Devon, England
- Died: 15 March 2025 (aged 82)
- School: Bristol Grammar School
- University: Loughborough University

Rugby union career
- Position: Centre
Senior career
Years	Team	Apps	(Points)
- Loughborough Colleges
–	Moseley RFC		
International career
Years	Team	Apps	(Points)
1966–1968	England	11	(Pts:15;)
1966	British Lions	4	(3)

Colin William McFadyean (/məkˈfædjən/; 11 March 1943 – 15 March 2025) was an England international rugby union player and captain.

== Biography ==
McFadyean was born in Tavistock, Devon, England on 11 March 1943. He was capped eleven times for England between 1966 and 1968, nine times as a centre and twice on the wing and captained England in his last two internationals in 1968. He scored four tries for England, including two in one game against Scotland in March 1967, and also scored one dropped goal for England.

He was selected for the 1966 British Lions tour to Australia and New Zealand, playing in all four internationals against the All Blacks and scoring one try.

McFadyean played club rugby for Moseley.

McFadyean died from pneumonia and sepsis on 15 March 2025, at the age of 82.

Sporting positions
Preceded by Phil Judd	England national rugby union team captain 1968	Succeeded by Mike Weston
