= Midland Counties Football Union =

Midland Counties
- Full name: Midland Counties Football Union
- Founded: 1879; 146 years ago
- Disbanded: 1920; 105 years ago
- Region: The Midlands

The Midland Counties Football Union was a governing body for rugby union in The Midlands, England from 1879 to 1920.

== History ==
The organisation was formed as the Midland Counties Football Club and covered the counties of Derbyshire, Leicestershire, Lincolnshire, Nottinghamshire, Staffordshire, Warwickshire and Worcestershire. The Midland Counties representative team played in the County Championship from its inception in 1888 until 1920. The main club event was the Midland Counties Challenge Cup which continued to run until 1926.

== Disbandment ==
Up until and following the disbandment in 1920, the union broke up and distributed its assets to the following unions:

- North Midlands Rugby Football Union
- Leicestershire Rugby Union (Note: The Leicestershire RU was formed back in 1887, with the Leicestershire County Cup club competition running as early as 1890. However, a Leicestershire county representative side did not actually feature in the County Championship until after 1920 when the RFU finally awarded them full constituent membership. Prior to this, Leicestershire had been a sub-member of the Midland Counties Union and contributed county championship players to a Midlands side.)
- Warwickshire Rugby Football Union (Note: the Warwickshire RFU was formed 1914 from local clubs that had formerly been part of the Midland Counties Football Union.)

The North Midlands was given responsibility for clubs sides based in Birmingham and the West Midlands, Herefordshire, Staffordshire, Shropshire and Worcestershire, most of which were sub-members under the North Midlands umbrella (the Staffordshire RU would later achieve full RFU membership in 1962). The Leicestershire and Warwickshire unions became full county constituents in their own right.

Club sides that had been based in Derbyshire, Lincolnshire and Nottinghamshire would later join the Notts, Lincs & Derbyshire Rugby Football Union (created 1926).

== Honours ==
- 1913–14 Rugby Union County Championship winners

== Midland Counties Cup ==
The Midland Counties Cup was inaugurated during the 1880-81 season and held for the first time the following season.

=== Past winners ===
| Year | Winners | Runner-up |
|---|---|---|
| 1881-82 | Moseley | Leamington Rovers |
| 1882-83 | Burton-on-Trent | Moseley |
| 1883-84 | Moseley | Coventry |
| 1884-85 | Moseley | South Warwickshire Rovers |
| 1885-86 | Moseley | Rugby |
| 1886-87 | Moseley | Rugby |
| 1887-88 | Burton-on-Trent | Coventry |
| 1888-89 | Moseley | Leicester Tigers |
| 1889-90 | Old Edwardians | Burton-on-Trent |
| 1890-91 | Coventry | Leicester Tigers |
| 1891-92 | Coventry | Moseley |
| 1892-93 | Coventry | Burton-on-Trent |
| 1893-94 | Coventry | Leicester Tigers |
| 1894-95 | Moseley | Coventry |
| 1895-96 | Coventry | Moseley |
| 1896-97 | Moseley | Old Edwardians |
| 1897-98 | Leicester Tigers | Moseley |
| 1898-99 | Leicester Tigers | Nuneaton |
| 1899-1900 | Leicester Tigers | Moseley |
| 1900-01 | Leicester Tigers | Moseley |
| 1901-02 | Leicester Tigers | Moseley |
| 1902-03 | Leicester Tigers | Rugby |
| 1903-04 | Leicester Tigers | Moseley |
| 1904-05 | Leicester Tigers | Nottingham |
| 1905-06 | Nottingham | Moseley |
| 1906-07 | Coventry | Stratford-on-Avon |
| 1907-08 | Stratford-on-Avon | Nuneaton |
| 1908-09 | Leicester Tigers | Coventry |
| 1909-10 | Leicester Tigers | Coventry |
| 1910-11 | Coventry | Moseley |
| 1911-12 | Leicester Tigers | Coventry |
| 1912-13 | Leicester Tigers | Belgrave Premier Works |
| 1913-14 | Coventry + | Moseley + |
| 1919-20 | Coventry | Newbold-on-Avon RFC |
| 1921-22 | Nuneaton | Burton-on-Trent |
| 1922-23 | Coventry | Moseley |
| 1923-24 | Nuneaton | Coventry |
| 1924-25 | Moseley | Birmingham |
| 1925-26 | Newbold-on-Avon | Old Centrals |

+ Result declared null and void. The competition was discontinued after 1925-26.

=== Number of wins ===
- Leicester Tigers (12)
- Coventry (9) (Note: Coventry also won the 1914 competition but the result was later declared void, leaving them with 9 Midlands Cup titles instead of 10.)
- Moseley (9)
- Burton-on-Trent (2)
- Nuneaton (2)
- Newbold-on-Avon (1)
- Nottingham (1)
- Old Edwardians (1)
- Stratford-on-Avon (1)
