= Simon Smith (rugby union) =

England international rugby union player

- Born: Simon Timothy Smith; 29 April 1960 (age 66) Baldock, Hertfordshire
- University: University of Lancaster and University of Cambridge

Rugby union career
International career
Years	Team	Apps	(Points)
1985–1986	England	9	

Simon Timothy Smith (born 1960) is a rugby union international who represented England between 1985 and 1986.

== Early life ==
Simon Smith was born on 29 April 1960 in Baldock, Hertfordshire, and educated at the University of Lancaster and then did a postgraduate course at the University of Cambridge. He played on the wing for Wasps

He played rugby for England in nine matches between 1985 and 1986.
