= Johnny Williams (rugby union, born 1932) =

English rugby union player

John Edward Williams (31 January 1932, Leeds – 5 October 2009, Sandhurst) was a British international rugby player.

He was born in Leeds, Yorkshire and played as a scrum-half for Old Millhillians and Middlesex. He was capped nine times for England between 1954 and 1965. He also toured with the British Lions in South Africa, but was not selected to play in any of the test matches.
