= Pat Quinn (English rugby) =

England international rugby union & league footballer

Personal information
- Full name: James Patrick Quinn
- Born: 19 February 1930 Widnes, England
- Died: 18 January 1986 (aged 55) Leicester, England

Playing information
- Height: 5 ft 11 in (1.80 m)
- Weight: 13 st 3 lb (84 kg)
- Position: Fullback
Club
Years	Team	Pld	T	G	FG	P
1956–59	Leeds	108	28	8	1	102
Representative
Years	Team	Pld	T	G	FG	P
1957	Lancashire	1	0	0	0	0

James Patrick Quinn (19 February 1930 – 18 January 1986) was an English rugby union, and professional rugby league footballer who played in the 1950s. He played at club level for New Brighton F.C., and representative level rugby league (RL) for Lancashire, and at club level rugby league (RL) for Leeds, as a fullback.

== Background ==
Pat Quinn was born in Widnes, Lancashire, England, he was a teacher at the County Secondary School in Harehills, Leeds during the 1950s, and he died aged 55 in Leicester, Leicestershire

== Playing career ==
=== Challenge Cup Final appearances ===
Pat Quinn played fullback, and scored a try in Leeds' 9-7 victory over Barrow in the 1957 Challenge Cup Final during the 1956–57 season at Wembley Stadium, London on Saturday 11 May 1957, in front of a crowd of 76,318.
