= Alan Morley =

England international rugby union player

- Born: Alan John George Morley; 25 June 1950 (age 76) Bristol, England
- School: Colston's School

Rugby union career
- Position: Wing
Senior career
Years	Team	Apps	(Points)
1968–1986	Bristol	519	(1516)
International career
Years	Team	Apps	(Points)
1972–1975	England	7	(8)

Alan John George Morley MBE (born 25 June 1950 in Bristol, England) is a former English rugby union player.

He played a record number of 519 times for Bristol, scoring 384 tries, between 1968 and 1986.

He won 7 England caps, from 1972 to 1975, scoring 2 tries, 8 points on aggregate. He played at the 1975 Five Nations Championship, scoring a try. He was selected for the 1974 Lions tour but didn't make the Test side, having to compete with J.J. Williams, Billy Steele and Andy Irvine. The highlight of his international career was probably scoring a try on his international début on 3 June 1972, against South Africa when an unfancied England side won 18–9.
