= Warren Spragg =

Italy international rugby union footballer

- Born: 1 November 1982 (age 44) Manchester, England
- Height: 6 ft 0 in (183 cm)
- Weight: 13 st 8 lb (86 kg)
- School: Kirkham Grammar School

Rugby union career
- Position(s): Wing, Fullback
Senior career
Years	Team	Apps	(Points)
2002–2003	Sale Sharks	1	(0)
2003–2004	Wakefield		
2004–2006	Orrell		
2006–2008	Calvisano	29	(45)
2008–2012	Petrarca	63	(105)
2012–	Fylde		
International career
Years	Team	Apps	(Points)
2006	Italy	1	(0)

Warren Spragg (born 1 November 1982 in Manchester) is an English-born Italian rugby union international. He is a versatile back and goalkicker.

== Education ==
Warren Spragg was educated at Audenshaw School, he then went on to Kirkham Grammar School. He played for the school rugby union first XV in 1999/00 and 2000/01 when the school side went unbeaten.

== Representative honours ==
While at Kirkham Grammar School, Warren was a member of the England Schools 18 group team that toured Australia and New Zealand in 2001. He scored a try in the England victory over the Australia Schoolboys.
