= Charlie Hannaford (rugby union) =

England international rugby union player

- Born: Ronald Charles Hannaford; 19 October 1944 (age 82) Gloucester, Gloucestershire, England
- University: Durham and Cambridge

Rugby union career
- Position: No. 8
International career
Years	Team	Apps	(Points)
1971	England	3	(3)

Ronald Charles Hannaford is an English educator and former rugby union international who represented England in the 1971 Five Nations.

== Personal ==
Hannaford attended The Crypt School in Gloucester and then studied at Durham University, where one of his contemporaries on the university team was future England international Peter Dixon.

He came close to being dismissed from university after an academically disastrous second year, but was saved by the intervention of Zoologist David Barker. After graduating from Durham with a 2:1 he continued his education at Churchill College, Cambridge, and represented Cambridge University R.U.F.C. Hannaford taught biology at Sherborne School (1968–1970), and later at Clifton College and Millfield. He moved to New Zealand in 1975, but eventually returned to England where he worked at Rendcomb College (1983–1988) and then at Seaford College as headmaster. By 1997 he was reportedly retired in France.

== Rugby union career ==
He made his test debut against Wales, scoring a try in a 22–6 defeat. His final international appearance at test level came against France in the same tournament. He later toured the Far East with England, playing against Japan.
