= Mike Rafter =

England international rugby union player

- Born: 31 March 1952 (age 74) Bristol, England

Rugby union career
- Position: Flanker
Amateur team(s)
Years	Team	Apps	(Points)
1972–1984	Bristol		
International career
Years	Team	Apps	(Points)
1977–1981	England	17	(0)

Mike Rafter (born 31 March 1952) is a rugby union coach and former Bristol and England flanker.

== Bristol career ==
After having initially been an association football player (going on trial at Bristol City Football Club as a 14-year-old), Rafter became a rugby union convert as a pupil at St Brendan's College and signed up for Bristol, making his debut in 1973 against Exeter. He went on to become captain of the Bristol team, and led them to their historic cup victory over Leicester in the 1982–83 season.

== England career ==
Rafter made his England debut in 1977 in the 26–6 victory over Scotland at Twickenham. He was a member of the Grand Slam-winning side of 1980, and competed in his last England international in 1981, against Argentina in Buenos Aires, to finish his international career with 17 caps.
