= Mike Harrison (rugby union) =

English rugby union player (born 1956)

- Born: Michael Edward Harrison; 9 April 1956 (age 70) Barnsley, West Riding of Yorkshire
- Height: 5 ft 10 in (1.78 m)
- School: QEGS, Wakefield
- Occupation: Banking

Rugby union career
- Position: Wing
Amateur team(s)
Years	Team	Apps	(Points)
- Wakefield
–	Wakefield Cougars		
International career
Years	Team	Apps	(Points)
1985–1988	England	15	(32)

Michael Edward Harrison (born 9 April 1956) in Barnsley, West Riding of Yorkshire) is a former first-class rugby union footballer, playing on the wing for Wakefield and England.

He was educated at QEGS Wakefield and played for Yorkshire schools at under 16 and 19 levels and North East Schools against Australian schools.

He also won a schools athletics vest for Yorkshire as a sprinter and triple jumper and competed in the national schools championships.

He was involved in a serious car accident in 1975 and eye injuries prevented him playing rugby for more than two years.

In 1978 he joined Wakefield RFC as a scrum half in the third team before moving to centre and finally right wing for the first team where he played in over 300 games.

He has played 53 times for Yorkshire between 1981 and 1996. He also represented the North of England against Fiji (1982) and Australia (1984).

Harrison made his England debut during the 1985 tour to New Zealand at the relatively advanced age of 29. England lost both tests, but Harrison scored a breakaway try in each to earn himself the nickname "Burglar Bill". Subsequently a local brewery named a drink "Burglar Bill" after him.

By 1987, Harrison had become a regular fixture in the side, playing in 14 of the next 15 England matches, including all four games of the 1987 Five Nations, one of which was as captain. His appointment came about when current skipper and scrum-half Richard Hill was suspended for allegedly inciting a violent clash with Wales. Harrison's first game in charge resulted in victory over Scotland and he marked the occasion with a try.

He kept the captaincy for the inaugural World Cup in New Zealand in 1987 where he led by example and enjoyed good try-scoring form. In the opening match against Australia, Harrison scored another breakaway try to give his side a surprise lead. England remained in contention at 6–6 but could not respond to losing full-back Marcus Rose to concussion and a highly controversial try scored by David Campese. England lost 19–6, but came back to crush Japan, Harrison himself grabbing a hat-trick in thirteen minutes as England racked up ten tries. He scored his fifth try of the tournament against the USA, but England lost to Wales in the quarter-finals, thought by some to have been the worst match of the tournament.

Harrison played the first two games of the 1988 Five Nations but was then dropped and never again called upon to represent his country.

Mike Harrison currently works in banking and occasionally works as an expert summariser on the radio. He is married to Marion with three children; Fiona, Anne and Simon.

== Mike Harrison's International Record ==
1985 v New Zealand (Christchurch) L 18–13

1985 v New Zealand (Wellington) L 42–15
1986 v Scotland (Murrayfield) L 33–6 (FN)
1986 v Ireland (Twickenham) W 25–20 (FN)
1986 v France (Paris) L 29–10 (FN)
1987 v Ireland (Dublin) L 17–0 (FN)
1987 v France (Twickenham) L 19–15 (FN)
1987 v Wales (Cardiff) L 19–12 (FN)
1987 v Scotland (Twickenham) W 21–12 (FN) (Captain)
1987 v Australia (Sydney) L 19–6 (W. Cup) (Captain)
1987 v Japan (Sydney) W 60–7 (W. Cup) (Captain)
1987 v USA (Sydney) W 34–6 (W. Cup) (Captain)
1987 v Wales (Brisbane) L 16–3 (W. Cup) (Captain)
1988 v France](Paris) L 10–9 (FN) (Captain)
1988 v Wales (Twickenham) L 11–3 (FN) (Captain)

Career Record: P15, W4, L11 Test Points: 32 Tries: 8

== Sources ==
- Wakefield Rugby Football Club—1901–2001 A Centenary History. Written and compiled by David Ingall in 2001
- England v Ireland official match programme 1 March 1986
- Sporting Heroes.net
- Mike Harrison at ESPNscrum (archived)

Sporting positions
Preceded by Richard Hill	English National Rugby Union Captain; Apr 1987 – Feb 1988	Succeeded by Nigel Melville
