= Peter Robbins (rugby union) =

England international rugby union player

- Born: Peter George Derek Robbins; 21 September 1933 Coventry, England
- Died: 25 March 1987 (aged 53) Birmingham
- School: Bishop Vesey's Grammar School
- University: Oxford
- Occupation(s): Schoolteacher; Business person

Rugby union career
- Position: Flanker
Amateur team(s)
Years	Team	Apps	(Points)
- Moseley
–	Coventry		
International career
Years	Team	Apps	(Points)
1956–1962	England	19	

Peter George Derek Robbins (21 September 1933 – 25 March 1987), also known as P. G. D. Robbins, was an international rugby union player who earned 19 caps playing for England.

== Life ==
Robbins was born in Coventry on 21 September 1933, with his twin David, the eighth and ninth children of twelve by Charles and Jessamine Robbins. He was educated at Bishop Vesey's Grammar School and St Edmund Hall, Oxford, with National Service in the Royal Air Force Regiment in between. After university, he took a position as a French and Latin teacher at King Edward's School, Birmingham from 1958 to 1968, before going into commerce. After several employments he eventually set up his own company, West Midlands Cleaning Services in 1979. He was also a public speaker and a writer, being Rugby correspondent for the Financial Times.

He married Eileen Lemon, whom he met while she was still at school, in September 1958 and they had two children, Richard and Helen.

Along with many other rugby players he was a keen golfer, and it became his main sporting activity after he finished playing rugby. He liked jazz music and played the double bass.

He died 25 March 1987 in the Priory Hospital, Edgbaston, Birmingham of a cerebral haemorrhage.

On 2 March 1988 a match between Penguin International RFC and Oxford University RFC was played as the P G D Robbins memorial match.

== Sporting career ==
Robbins played the position then known as wing forward in the back row, firstly for Coventry and Oxford University where he earned 4 “blues” and was captain of his final match. He played in the combined Oxford and Cambridge team's international tours in 1955, 1956 and 1957. It was while still a student that he played for England the first time on 21 January 1956, against Wales. He went on to play for England a total of 19 times, the last being 17 March 1962 against Scotland. After leaving university he joined Moseley Rugby Football Club, which he captained, then later went back to Coventry, which he also captained. He also played 12 games for the Barbarians rugby team, including captain in 1959, and was player-manager for the 1963 Oxford and Cambridge rugby tour of East and South Africa. He was selected for the British Lions tour of New Zealand in 1959, but broke his leg in a Barbarians match, and thus never had this sporting honour.

On the field, he was known for his speed, and according to fellow team player M. J. K. Smith "I never saw him commit a foul in his life."

The Rugby Football Union barred Robbins from any activity associated with the national amateur game (playing, coaching etc.), when he started contributing to the Financial Times on rugby matters, counting him as a professional.

== Quotation ==
“What is rugby? It is a strong drink to be sipped slowly and in the company of true friends”
