= Bert Godwin =

British Lions & England international rugby union player

- Full name: Herbert Godwin
- Born: 21 December 1935 Abergavenny, Wales
- Died: 7 January 2006 (aged 70) Teignbridge, Devon, England

Rugby union career
- Position: Hooker
International career
Years	Team	Apps	(Points)
1959–67	England	11	(3)
1962	British Lions		

Herbert Godwin (21 December 1935 – 7 January 2006) was an English international rugby union player.

Born in Wales, Godwin moved from Monmouthshire to Coventry during his childhood. He went back to Wales to bunker down during the war and afterwards returned to Coventry, where he attended Broadway Secondary Modern School.

Godwin, a hooker, played over 250 matches for Coventry RFC in the 1950s and 1960s, forming a front-row partnership with England prop Phil Judd. He gained 11 England caps, debuting in the 1959 Five Nations match against France at Twickenham. In 1962, Godwin replaced an injured Stan Hodgson on the British Lions squad touring South Africa.

== See also ==
- List of British & Irish Lions players
- List of England national rugby union players
