= Phil Judd (rugby union) =

England international rugby union player

Philip Edward Judd (8 April 1934 – 14 June 2015) was an England international rugby union player and captain.

Judd was capped twenty-two times for England as a prop between 1963 and 1966. He captained England in his last five internationals, including the 1967 Five Nations Championship.

Judd began his rugby career playing for Broadstreet RFC before progressing to play for his city side Coventry.

Sporting positions
Preceded by Richard Sharp	English National Rugby Union Captain; 1967	Succeeded by Colin McFadyean
