= 1971–72 Rugby Union County Championship =

English rugby union competition

1971–72 County Championship
- Countries: England
- Champions: Gloucestershire (10th title)
- Runners-up: Warwickshire

The 1971–72 Rugby Union County Championship was the 72nd edition of England's County Championship rugby union club competition. The competition was no longer the premier club competition because a National Knockout Competition called the John Player Cup had been introduced.

Gloucestershire won their tenth title (but first since 1937) after defeating Warwickshire in the final.

== Semi finals ==
Team One	Team Two	Score
Middlesex	Gloucestershire	16-19
Warwickshire	Yorkshire	7-6

== Final ==
11 March 1972

Warwickshire	6–11	Gloucestershire
Try: Duckham; Con: Rossborough		Try: Hannaford, Morley; Pen: Stephens

Coundon Road, Coventry
Referee: R F Johnson (London)

15	Peter Rossborough	Coventry
14	David Duckham	Coventry
13	Geoff Evans	Coventry
12	R E Griffiths	Coventry
11	R E Ward	Coventry
10	Peter Preece	Coventry
9	Chris Gifford	Coventry
1	Keith Fairbrother (capt)	Coventry
2	John Gray	Coventry
3	John Creed	Coventry
4	M Ford	Nuneaton
5	Barry Ninnes	Coventry
6	R C Colt	Coventry
7	Tim Cowell	Rugby
8	John Barton	Coventry

15	Peter Knight	Bristol
14	Alan Morley	Bristol
13	Richard Jardine	Gloucester
12	Jonathan Gabitass	Bristol
11	Eric Stephens	Gloucester
10	Bob Redwood	Cheltenham
9	John Cannon	Clifton
1	Robin Cowling	Gloucester
2	John Pullin	Bristol
3	Mike Burton	Gloucester
4	Dave Watt (capt)	Bristol
5	Alan Brinn	Gloucester
6	Dave Rollitt	Bristol
7	Dick Smith	Gloucester
8	Charlie Hannaford	Bristol

== See also ==
- English rugby union system
- Rugby union in England
