= 1972–73 RFU Knockout Cup =

English rugby cup

1972–73 RFU National KO competition

Tournament statistics

The 1972–73 RFU Knockout Cup was the second edition of England's premier rugby union club competition at the time. Coventry won the competition defeating Bristol in the final. In the final John Pullin was stretchered off after only a few minutes with a leg injury that resulted in Bristol playing most of the match with 14 men. The final was held at Twickenham Stadium.

== Draw and results ==
=== Second round ===
Team one	Team two	Score
Bristol	Gloucester	16-11
Exeter	Penryn	4-13
Moseley	Coventry	9-13
London Scottish	London Welsh	7-22
Wilmslow	Sale	9-12
Hinckley	Leicester	4-16
Orrell	Morley	11-9
Metropolitan Police*	Rosslyn Park	12-12

(Metropolitan Police* progress by virtue of scoring a try)

=== Quarter-finals ===
Team one	Team two	Score
Orrell	Coventry	0-29
Metropolitan Police	Bristol	10-26
Penryn	London Welsh	6-19
Sale	Leicester	7-0

=== Semi-finals ===
Team one	Team two	Score
Sale	Coventry	6-35
London Welsh	Bristol	15-18

=== Final ===
28 April 1973

Coventry	27–15	Bristol
Try: John Barton; David Duckham; John Gray; Geoff Evans; Con: Peter Rossborough; Pen: Peter Rossborough (2); Drop: Alan Cowman		Pen: Alan Pearn (5)

Twickenham Stadium, London
Attendance: 11,500
Referee: R.F 'Johnny' Johnson (London Society)

Coventry
Bristol

1	Peter Rossborough
2	David Duckham (c)
3	Chris Wardlow
4	Geoff Evans
5	Peter Preece
6	Alan Cowman
7	Bill Gittings
8	Keith Fairbrother
9	John Gray
10	Jim Broderick
11	Barry Ninnes
12	Ian Darnell
13	Brian Holt
14	John Barton
15	Roger Creed

A	Peter Knight
B	Michael Dandy
C	Chris Williams
D	Roger Swaffield
E	Alan Morley
F	Tony Nicholls (c)
G	Alan Pearn
H	A J Rogers
I	John Pullin
J	Mike Fry
K	Dave Watt
L	R J Odledge
M	Dave Rollitt
O	Charlie Hannaford
N	Andy Munden
