= 1973–74 RFU Knockout Cup =

English rugby cup

1973–74 RFU National KO competition

Tournament statistics

The 1973–74 RFU Knockout Cup was the third edition of England's premier rugby union club competition at the time. Coventry won the competition for the second successive year defeating London Scottish in the final. The final was held at Twickenham Stadium.

== Draw and results ==
=== Second round ===
Team one	Team two	Score
Saracens	Northampton	4-15
Bath	Wilmslow	8-17
Clifton	Sale	3-6
Coventry	Gosforth	15-6
Gloucester	London Scottish	9-12
Orrell	Harlequins	25-7
Richmond	Bristol	16-14
Rosslyn Park	Moseley	18-12

=== Quarter-finals ===
Team one	Team two	Score
Orrell	Northampton	19-9
Richmond	London Scottish	0-7
Sale	Rosslyn Park	12-42
Wilmslow	Coventry	7-19

=== Semi-finals ===
Team one	Team two	Score
Coventry	Rosslyn Park	23-4
Orrell	London Scottish	3-12

=== Final ===
27 April 1974

Coventry	26–6	London Scottish
Try: Tim Barnwell; David Duckham (2); Bill Gittings; Con: Peter Rossborough (2); Pen: Peter Rossborough (2)		Pen: David Bell (2)

Twickenham Stadium, London
Referee: Mike Titcomb (Bristol Society)

15	Peter Rossborough
14	David Duckham (c)
13	Barrie Corless
12	David Foulks
11	Tim Barnwell
10	Alan Cowman
9	Bill Gittings
1	Jim Broderick
2	John Gallagher
3	Keith Fairbrother
4	Barry Ninnes
5	Ian Darnell
6	Richard Walker
7	Les Rolinson
8	Robin Cardwell
Coach:
Thomas Grant

1	George Stevenson
2	Doug Fowlie
3	Alastair Biggar
4	Alan Friell
5	Bob Keddie
6	David Bell
7	Peter Crerar
8	Mike Lovett
9	Dave Pickering
10	Sandy Corstorphine
11	Alastair McHarg
12	Graeme Fraser
13	Charlie Thorburn
14	Mike Biggar (c)
15	Ross McKenzie
Coach:
Ron Jones
