= 1938–39 Rugby Union County Championship =

English rugby union competition

1938–39 County Championship
- Countries: England
- Champions: Warwickshire (1st title)
- Runners-up: Somerset

The 1938–39 Rugby Union County Championship was the 46th edition of England's premier rugby union club competition at the time.

Warwickshire won the competition for the first time after defeating Somerset in the final.

== Semifinals ==
Team one	Team two	Score
Warwickshire	Cheshire	20-12
Somerset	Hampshire	5-3

== Final ==
11 March 1939

Somerset	3–8	Warwickshire
Pen: White		Try: Kaye, Bruce Lockhart; Con: Pridmore

Weston-super-Mare
Referee: Cyril Gadney

R G Jenkins	Weston-super-Mare
A V Rogers	Bath
E A Thomas	Somerset Police
F McRae	St Mary's Hospital
S W Collett	Weston-super-Mare
G I White	Weston-super-Mare
D L Roberts	Somerset Police
R Davies	Somerset Police
S H Justin	Bristol
F W Williams	Somerset Police
W F Gay	Bath
L H Seargeant	Bristol
G M Fursland	Bridgwater
John Watkins	Royal Navy
F Goddard	Taunton

H Pateman	Coventry
F O Wheatley	Coventry
E G L Mark	Manchester
C A Pridmore	Metropolitan Police
J Kaye	Coventry
Rab Bruce Lockhart	Rugby
Jimmy Giles	Coventry
S A Walker	Coventry
W Riley	Nuneaton
Harold Wheatley	Coventry
E P R Bates	Rugby
Arthur Wheatley	Coventry
A W Seaton	Coventry
Griff Purchas	Coventry
C T Bloxham	Nuneaton

== See also ==
- English rugby union system
- Rugby union in England
