= Allan Clarke (rugby union) =

England international rugby union player

- Full name: Allan James Clarke
- Born: 21 February 1913 Coventry, England
- Died: 25 September 1975 (aged 62) Coventry, England
- School: South Street School
- Occupation: Publican

Rugby union career
- Position: Lock
International career
Years	Team	Apps	(Points)
1935–36	England	6	(0)

Allan James Clarke (21 February 1913 – 25 September 1975) was an English international rugby union player.

== Biography ==
Born and raised in Coventry, Clarke was educated at South Street School, noted for producing several other England players of the 1930s. Jimmy Giles attended the school, as did the Wheatley brothers, Arthur and Harold.

Clarke, a giant Coventry second-rower, gained six England caps across the 1935 and 1936 Home Nations. He was a Warwickshire representative player and gained Barbarians selection in 1935, but injury prevented him from touring.

Post rugby, Clarke managed the Maudslay Hotel on Allesley Old Road in Coventry.

== See also ==
- List of England national rugby union players
