= 1974 Five Nations Championship =

Rugby union competition

- Date: 19 January – 16 March 1974
- Countries: England; Ireland; France; Scotland; Wales

Tournament statistics
- Champions: Ireland (8th title)
- Matches played: 10
- Tries scored: 22 (2.2 per match)
- Top point scorer: (England) Alan Old (33)
- Top try scorers: (Ireland) Mike Gibson (2) (Wales) J. J. Williams (2) (England) David Duckham (2)

The 1974 Five Nations Championship was the 45th season of the Five Nations Championship, a rugby union competition contested by the men's national teams of England, France, Ireland, Scotland and Wales. Including its previous incarnations as the Home Nations, this was the competition's 80th season. Ten matches were played between 19 January and 16 March. The championship was won by Ireland, the team's eighth outright title (seven other titles had been shared with other teams).

This was the first time ever that two games were played on the same weekend. This was brought in after the request from some teams, who complained that they had to always play early on in the year when bad weather prevailed, but others played in March, when the weather was better.

To get round this problem, the new format saw each team play each other's fixtures in a rotational period of scheduling. As an example, Scotland played England last in 1975, 1980, 1985. In 1976, 1981, 1986, 1991, the Scotland v England fixture was on the second weekend.

The 1974 tournament was closely contested with three of the matches ending in draws. Ireland topped the table after four rounds but had to sit out the final round of matches. Both France and Wales had chances to win the title, but both lost their last games. Welsh winger J. J. Williams appeared to score a winning try late in their game against England, but it was disallowed by referee John West, an Irishman, leading singer and Welsh rugby fan Max Boyce to compose a song about "blind Irish referees".

== Participants ==
Nation	Venue	City	Head coach	Captain
England	Twickenham Stadium	London	John Elders	John Pullin
France	Parc des Princes	Paris	Jean Desclaux	Max Barrau/Elie Cester
Ireland	Lansdowne Road	Dublin	Syd Millar	Willie John McBride
Scotland	Murrayfield Stadium	Edinburgh	Bill Dickinson	Ian McLauchlan
Wales	National Stadium	Cardiff	Clive Rowlands	Gareth Edwards

== Table ==
Pos	Team	Pld	W	D	L	PF	PA	PD	Pts
1	Ireland	4	2	1	1	50	45	+5	5
2	Scotland	4	2	0	2	41	35	+6	4
2	Wales	4	1	2	1	43	41	+2	4
2	France	4	1	2	1	43	53	−10	4
5	England	4	1	1	2	63	66	−3	3

== Results ==
19 January 1974

France	9–6	Ireland
Try: Boffelli; Con: Aguirre; Pen: Bérot		Pen: Ensor (2)

Parc des Princes, Paris
Attendance: 43,694
Referee: Alan Hosie (Scotland)

19 January 1974

Wales	6–0	Scotland
Try: Cobner; Con: Bennett

National Stadium, Cardiff
Referee: R. F. Johnson (England)

2 February 1974

Ireland	9–9	Wales
Pen: Ensor (3)		Try: J. J. Williams; Con: Bennett; Pen: Bennett

Lansdowne Road, Dublin
Referee: K. A. Pattinson (England)

2 February 1974

Scotland	16–14	England
Try: Irvine; Lauder; Con: Irvine; Pen: Irvine (2)		Try: Cotton; Neary; Pen: Old; Drop: Rossborough

Murrayfield Stadium, Edinburgh
Referee: J. Saint-Guilhem (France)

16 February 1974

Wales	16–16	France
Try: J. J. Williams; Pen: Bennett (3); Drop: Edwards		Try: Lux; Pen: Romeu (3); Drop: Romeu

National Stadium, Cardiff
Attendance: 60,000
Referee: N. Sanson (Scotland)

16 February 1974

England	21–26	Ireland
Try: Squires; Con: Old; Pen: Old (5)		Try: Gibson (2); Moloney; Moore; Con: Gibson (2); Pen: Ensor; Drop: Quinn

Twickenham Stadium, London
Referee: M. Joseph (Wales)

2 March 1974

Ireland	9–6	Scotland
Try: Milliken; Con: Gibson; Pen: McKinney		Pen: Irvine (2)

Lansdowne Road, Dublin
Referee: F. Palmade (France)

2 March 1974

France	12–12	England
Try: Romeu; Con: Romeu; Pen: Romeu; Drop: Romeu		Try: Duckham; Con: Old; Pen: Old; Drop: Evans

Parc des Princes, Paris
Attendance: 43,964
Referee: J. C. Kelleher (Wales)

16 March 1974

Scotland	19–6	France
Try: Dick; McHarg; Con: Irvine; Pen: Irvine (2); Morgan		Pen: Romeu; Drop: Romeu

Murrayfield Stadium, Edinburgh
Attendance: 60,000
Referee: K. H. Clark (Ireland)

16 March 1974

England	16–12	Wales
Try: Duckham; Ripley; Con: Old; Pen: Old (2)		Try: Davies; Con: Bennett; Pen: Bennett (2)

Twickenham Stadium, London
Referee: J. R. West (Ireland)
