= Tony Underwood =

British Lions & England international rugby union player

- Born: Tony Underwood; 17 February 1969 (age 57) Ipoh, Malaysia
- School: Barnard Castle School
- University: Leicester University; St Edmund's College, Cambridge
- Notable relative: Rory Underwood (brother)
- Occupation: Commercial Airline pilot

Rugby union career
- Position: Wing
Senior career
| Years | Team | Apps | (Points) |
| 19-1995 | Leicester Tigers | | |
| 1995-1999 | Newcastle Falcons | | |
International career
| Years | Team | Apps | (Points) |
| 1992-1998 | England | 27 | (65) |
| 1997 | British and Irish Lions | 1 | |

Tony Underwood (born 17 February 1969 in Ipoh, Malaysia) is a former English rugby union footballer who played as a wing three-quarter back. He is of Malaysian-English parentage.

== Rugby career ==
Underwood's rugby talent was first nurtured at Barnard Castle School. Upon leaving he was educated at Leicester University and St Edmund's College, Cambridge, where he studied from 1990 to 1992 and won a blue whilst a member of Cambridge University R.U.F.C.

Following his elder brother Rory, he played for Leicester Tigers and England. Tony had another brother called Gary, who played at under-21 level for England. He made his England debut in October 1992 against Canada, and went on to win a total of 27 English caps. Tony and Rory were the first brothers to play for England together since Harold and Arthur Wheatley in England's 1937 6–3 win over Scotland, and partnered in the 1995 Five Nations Grand Slam win.

He played in the Rugby World Cup in 1995, and in the Quarter final match against Australia he scored a try that many regard as one of the finest in running Rugby, with his right-wing counterpart Damien Smith failing to tackle him, and that helped England to reach the Semi-finals. In the Semi-final he had another memorable moment in which his opposite number, Jonah Lomu, ran a ring around him, before powering straight over the tackle of full back Mike Catt to score what would be one of his four tries in that game. In 1995, he left Leicester for Newcastle Falcons. At Newcastle he made 11 appearances as they won the 1997-98 Premiership. His last cap for England came in December 1998 against South Africa where he was replaced early; England went on to win. He would later feature in a Pizza Hut advertising campaign alongside Lomu.

== Post rugby ==
He is now retired from international rugby and having trained as a pilot, went on to fly for EasyJet. He then became a long-haul pilot for Virgin Atlantic. He was seen on ITV's Airline training to be a pilot, graduating, and completing his first flight with easyJet from London Luton Airport to Zurich. He used to live in Monkston, Milton Keynes. He lived in Dubai, where he flew the Airbus A380 as a captain for Emirates. He is married, with two children.
