= Rob Hardwick =

England international rugby union player

Robin John Kieren Hardwick (born 29 March 1969 (age 56)) is a former England international rugby union footballer who also captained and played 149 matches for Coventry and played 167 games for London Irish as a prop.

== Biography ==
A prop, Hardwick started his senior career with his home town club Coventry. The 1996–97 season, would be Coventry's most successful of the modern era, coming within touching distance of the Premiership. Along the way, with Hardwick as captain, they beat a Newcastle Falcons side featuring 15 internationals by 19–18 at Coundon Road. They would eventually finish third behind the well- funded Newcastle and champions Richmond but lost a promotion play-off against London Irish despite taking a narrow first leg advantage to Sunbury. Despite their second-tier status, both Hardwick and Danny Grewcock were capped by England in this era.

Hardwick's only England appearance came as a replacement against Italy during the 1996 Five Nations. He also represented England 'A' 20 times and played 3 times for the Barbarians.

He went on to play 167 games for London Irish where he was part of the team that won the Powergen Cup (LV=Cup) in 2002. He also spent one season in France playing for La Rochelle, making 27 appearances for them.
