= Ted Hewitt (rugby union) =

England international rugby union player

- Full name: Edwin Newbury Hewitt
- Born: 22 April 1924 Coventry, England
- Died: June 2003 (aged 79) Spain

Rugby union career
- Position: Fullback
International career
Years	Team	Apps	(Points)
1951	England	3	(2)

Edwin Newbury Hewitt (22 April 1924 – June 2003) was an English international rugby union player.

Hewitt grew up near Coundon Road Stadium in Coventry and was educated at Barkers Butts School.

A fullback, Hewitt was capped for England in three 1951 Five Nations matches, against Wales, Ireland and France. He was also a Warwickshire representative player and competed at club level with Coventry, which he captained.

Hewitt retired to Spain, where he died in 2003.

== See also ==
- List of England national rugby union players
