= Addleton =

Addleton is a surname. Notable people with the surname include:

- David Addleton, English rugby union coach
- Jonathan Addleton, American diplomat
