= Danny Grewcock =

British Lions & England international rugby union player

Danny Grewcock MBE
- Born: Daniel Jonathan Grewcock; 7 November 1972 (age 54) Coventry, England
- Height: 1.98 m (6 ft 6 in)
- Weight: 119 kg (18 st 10 lb)
- School: Eastern Green Woodlands
- University: Manchester Met.

Rugby union career
- Position: Lock
Youth career
- 1989–94: Barkers Butts
Senior career
Years	Team	Apps	(Points)
1994–1997	Coventry	33	(15)
1997–2001	Saracens	63	(25)
2001–2011	Bath	154	(30)
International career
Years	Team	Apps	(Points)
1997–2007	England	69	(10)
2001–2005	British & Irish Lions	5	(0)

Daniel Jonathan Grewcock MBE (born 7 November 1972) is an English former rugby union player who played as a lock. He played for Coventry, Saracens and Bath. He won 69 caps for England and five for the British & Irish Lions.

== Early life ==
Grewcock was born in Coventry and attended Templars Primary School in Tile Hill then the secondary in Eastern Green Woodlands School, Coventry, leaving school in 1989. His rugby career started with Barkers Butts and Coventry and he played for the Warwickshire U21 side at age 19.

He is a graduate of Manchester Metropolitan University.

== Rugby career ==
In 1996–97 he moved into the professional ranks with Coventry. It was Coventry's most successful period of the modern era, coming within touching distance of the Premiership. Along the way, with Grewcock an ever-present, they beat a Newcastle Falcons side featuring 15 internationals by 19-18 at Coundon Road. They eventually finished third to Newcastle and champions Richmond, and lost a promotion play-off against London Irish despite taking a narrow first leg advantage to Sunbury. Despite their second-tier status, both Grewcock and teammate Rob Hardwick were capped by England in this era.

Grewcock's first cap for England came in the 1997 tour to Argentina, scoring his first international try in the test in Buenos Aires. He was sent off during England's 1998 trip to New Zealand, after kicking an All Blacks' player in the head. He joined Saracens later that summer but switched to Bath for the 2001–02 season.

He played in all three Test matches for the British & Irish Lions against Australia and in six of the ten tour matches overall.

He was only able to make one appearance during the 2003 World Cup after a toe injury, and breaking a hand in England's match against Uruguay. He was replaced in the squad by Simon Shaw. He received a World Cup winner's medal in December 2004.

Grewcock returned to domestic rugby with Bath and produced some outstanding rugby, which led to his international recall as the successor for Martin Johnson in the Six Nations. He started in all three Autumn 2004 tests.

He was selected for the 2005 Lions tour to New Zealand. He was suspended for two months after being found guilty of biting New Zealand hooker Keven Mealamu during the first Test on 25 June.

Grewcock continued to play for England in the Six Nations Championship, where he received a yellow card against Ireland. He received a suspension that ruled him out of the 2007 World Cup. Grewcock signed a one-year extension to his Bath contract, which kept him there until the end of the 2010–11 season.

== Post Rugby Playing career ==
Danny retired in 2011 and took up a role with the Bath Academy, before working as Director of Sports at Oundle School.

In September 2019 joined Bristol Bears Academy in a dual role with Clifton College as High Performance Rugby Manager. He works alongside Matt Salter to develop the 1st & 2nd XV and 7s teams, working with Clifton College's high performing rugby players to help nurture their talent and to give them the best opportunity to move into a professional rugby environment at Bristol Bears.

== Disciplinary record ==
=== Incidents on international duty ===
He earned a five-week ban for a kicking offence after being sent off in 1998 at Carisbrook and six years later he received a six-week suspension after being found guilty of reckless use of his boot on Daniel Carter. When he returned in 2005 with the Lions, Grewcock was banned for two months for biting Keven Mealamu's finger. The suggestion that Mealamu had been in the process of hooking Grewcock's mouth was not proven, but the length of suspension given to Grewcock was way below that usually given to a player found guilty of biting. He also kicked Wales scrum half Dwayne Peel in the face during Wales' 11–9 victory over England in 2005, for which he received a yellow card and a slap in the face from Alfie.

=== Incidents with Bath Rugby ===
On 8 September 2002 he was sent-off following a clash with his one-time flatmate Kyran Bracken in Bath's 28–3 Zurich Premiership defeat to Saracens. Grewcock was initially banned for five-weeks after being found guilty of reckless use of his boot. Bath appealed against the ban; with Bracken's support and new photographic evidence of the incident, the appeal was successful and Grewcock's ban quashed. In March 2003, he was cited by the RFU of two counts of striking another player during Bath's 27–10 Premiership defeat to Northampton Saints on 15 March 2003. Grewcock was found not guilty of both striking charges but the unsporting behaviour complaint, where he was accused of ripping up the scrum-cap of Northampton lock Mark Connors, was upheld and a fine of £500 issued. An eventful season culminated with the receipt of a red card for punching Lawrence Dallaglio, in Bath's 30–48 European Challenge Cup final defeat to London Wasps on 25 May 2003. A post-match disciplinary hearing saw Grewcock suspended for 14 days, with the suspension commencing on 1 June 2003 and consequently ruling him out of the New Zealand leg of England's summer tour of the Southern Hemisphere. Consequently, having originally been named in the original 37-man squad, he was replaced by Tom Palmer.

Following a citing, Grewcock pleaded guilty to stamping on Nathan Bonner-Evans in Bath's 18–16 home Guinness Premiership victory over Sale Sharks on 22 December 2006. He received a one-week suspension for the offence. The same season saw him cited a second time, this time for a punch on Thibault Privat in Bath's 22–16 defeat by Clermont Auvergne in the European Challenge Cup final on 19 May 2007. He was found guilty and suspended for the period 8 June – 15 September 2007 which, taking into account the close season of inactivity, meant that he was suspended from playing rugby for a period of seven weeks, the start of his season being judged to be 4 August 2007. He lodged an appeal against the ban but was unsuccessful.

After remaining trouble-free for over two years, he was cited for striking Neil de Kock in Bath's home Guinness Premiership 11–12 defeat to Saracens on 31 October 2009. He pleaded guilty to the charge and received a two-week suspension. On 23 January 2010, Grewcock received his third red card in Bath's colours when he stamped on the forearm of Ulster's Stephen Ferris in the club's 10–28 home Heineken Cup defeat; the dismissal saw him receive a seven-week suspension.

== Honours ==
Grewcock was awarded an MBE in the Queen's 2003 New Year's Honours list, along with other players from Bath – Iain Balshaw, Mike Catt and Mike Tindall – who were in England's World Cup squad.

== Personal life ==
He is a supporter of Coventry City FC.
