= Max Barrau =

French rugby union player (born 1950)

- Born: 26 November 1950 (age 75) Beaumont-de-Lomagne, France
- Height: 5 ft 6 in (168 cm)
- Weight: 150 lb (68 kg)

Rugby union career
- Position: Scrum-half
International career
Years	Team	Apps	(Points)
1971–74	France	15	(4)

Max Barrau (born 26 November 1950) is a French former rugby union international.

Barrau, born in Beaumont-de-Lomagne, was one of four sons of Stade Beaumontois club president Albert Barrau.

Capped 15 times, Barrau was France's preferred scrum-half between 1971 and 1974. He had a place on both the 1971 tour of South Africa and 1972 tour of Australia. In 1973, Barrau was amongst France's best players in their win over the All Blacks at the Parc des Princes. He captained France in their 1974 Five Nations Championship opener against Ireland, which they won through an injury time penalty kick by Jean-Louis Bérot.

Barrau drew the ire of the French federation in 1974 after a third change of clubs in three seasons. The federation was keen to discourage such practice in an amateur competition and the transfer commission gave Barrau a "red playing license" for his request to return to his training club Stade Beaumontois. This meant he had to sit out of first team rugby at Stade Beaumontois for two seasons and ended his time in the national team.

His nephew, Mathieu Barrau, was also a scrum-half for France.

== See also ==
- List of France national rugby union players
