= 1985–86 Rugby Union County Championship =

English rugby union competition

1985–86 Thorn EMI County Championship
- Countries: England
- Champions: Warwickshire (9th title)
- Runners-up: Kent

The 1985–86 Thorn EMI Rugby Union County Championship was the 86th edition of England's County Championship rugby union club competition.

Warwickshire won their ninth title after defeating Kent in the final.

== Semi finals ==
Date	Team One	Team Two	Score
8 Mar	Warwickshire	Lancashire	19-15
8 Mar	Kent	Gloucestershire	16-3

== Final ==
12 April 1986

Warwickshire	16–6	Kent
Try: Robbins (3); Con: Thomas S (2)		Pen: Field; Drop: Colyer

Twickenham
Referee: Laurie Prideaux (North Midlands)

Steven Hall	Barkers' Butts
C Leake	Nuneaton
C Millerchip	Coventry
R Massey	Coventry
Stuart Hall	Coventry
Tim Buttimore	Leicester
S Thomas	Coventry
L Johnson	Coventry
A Farrington	Coventry
S Wilkes	Coventry
P Thomas	Coventry
A Gulliver	Coventry
B Kidner	Coventry
R Travers	Rugby
Graham Robbins (capt)	Coventry

Stuart Thresher	Harlequins
J Field	Askeans
L Cokell	Blackheath
R Bodenham (capt)	Blackheath
D Osbourne	Rosslyn Park
N Colyer	Blackheath
C Read	Plymouth Albion
P Essenhigh	Blackheath
R Howe	Blackheath
K Rutter	Blackheath
D Vaughan	Blackheath
D Hursey	Blackheath
P McRae	Askeans
Mickey Skinner	Harlequins
R Cheval	Askeans

== See also ==
- English rugby union system
- Rugby union in England
