= Ernie Robinson =

Ernie Robinson may refer to:

- Ernie Robinson (footballer)
- Ernie Robinson (rugby union)
