= John Owen (rugby union) =

England international rugby union player

- Full name: John Ernest Owen
- Born: 21 September 1939 (age 87) Sutton Coldfield, England

Rugby union career
- Position: Lock
International career
Years	Team	Apps	(Points)
1963–67	England	14	(3)

John Ernest Owen (born 21 September 1939) is an English former international rugby union player.

A Cambridge University blue, Owen was a lock and made over 150 appearances for Coventry, while gaining 14 England caps during the 1960s. He broke into the England team for their title-winning 1963 Five Nations campaign and featured in all four matches, scoring a try on debut against Wales. Later that year, Owen was part of the tour of Australasia and played the one-off Test against the Wallabies in Sydney. He made his last England appearance in a 1967 match against the All Blacks at Twickenham.

== See also ==
- List of England national rugby union players
