= Harry Walker (rugby union, born 1915) =

England international rugby union player

- Born: 11 February 1915
- Died: 5 June 2018 (aged 103)

Rugby union career
- Position: Prop
Amateur team(s)
Years	Team	Apps	(Points)
1932–1952	Coventry		
	Warwickshire	30	
International career
Years	Team	Apps	(Points)
1947–1948	England	9	

Harry Walker (11 February 1915 – 5 June 2018) was an English rugby union player and was the oldest living former England international player until his death. He made his international debut on 18 January 1947 against Wales at Twickenham. His last international was against France in 1948.

He initially played as a flanker for Coventry before switching to prop. Walker celebrated his 103rd birthday with former players at a Coventry rugby club dinner held in his honour.
