= RFU Knockout Cup =

Rugby union event

- Sport: Rugby union
- Founded: 1971; 55 years ago
- Folded: 2005; 21 years ago
- Replaced by: Anglo-Welsh Cup
- Countries: England
- Last champion: Leeds Tykes (1st title)
- Most titles: Bath (10 titles)

The RFU Knockout Cup was an English rugby union competition open to any member of the Rugby Football Union. First contested in 1971, it was the premier competition in English club rugby before the establishment of the English league structure in 1987.

The competition was replaced by the Anglo-Welsh Cup, involving 4 Welsh regional sides in addition to the 12 English Premiership clubs, beginning with the 2005–06 season.

== History ==
=== Background ===
The RFU had long resisted national competitions as it was thought that they would encourage player payments. Thus, most club matches were only organised friendlies, with competitions such as the County Cups being the highest honours a club could win. The County Championship, established in 1889, was the only national competition for 82 years.

=== 1971–75: RFU Knockout Cup ===
The first competition took place in the 1971–72 season, when Gloucester defeated Moseley in the final 17–6, to become the inaugural champions. Coventry RFC won two titles in succession in 1973 and 1974, followed by Bedford's championship win in 1975.

=== 1976–88: John Player Cup ===
The competition gained its first sponsor in tobacco firm John Player & Sons in 1976.

Gosforth won the first two editions under this new name in 1976 and 1977. Gloucester won their second title in 1978. The competition was then dominated by Leicester, who won three championships in a row, until Gloucester won their third title in 1982. This was shared with Moseley after a 12–12 draw in extra time, and was the only time the cup was shared between two teams. Leicester were again in the final in 1983, but lost to Bristol. Leicester's record run was then broken by Bath from 1984 to 1987, who won the cup four times in a row, until Harlequins won their first in 1988.

=== 1988–97: Pilkington Cup ===
The cup was named after glass manufacturing company Pilkington for the 1988-89 tournament.

Bath picked up from where they left off in the late 1980s, going onto win another six times from 1989 to 1996. Harlequins won their second title in 1991, and Leicester added to their three championships in 1993 and again in 1997.

=== 1997–2000: Tetley's Bitter Cup ===
Tetley's Brewery became title sponsor in the 1997–98 season, naming the cup after their bitter.

Saracens won their first title, defeating Wasps in 1998. Wasps were again in the final in 1999, and defeated Newcastle to claim their first championship. Wasps also won the 2000 competition.

=== 2000–05: Powergen Cup ===
In 2000, energy supplier Powergen became the final title sponsor.

Newcastle won the first Powergen Cup, defeating the Harlequins 30–27. London Irish won it for their first time the following season, and Gloucester won it for the first time since 1982 in 2003. Newcastle won in 2004, and in 2005, Leeds Tykes defeated Bath to win it for the first time.

== Demise ==
Starting in 2005–06, the cup was replaced by a new format including only the twelve teams from the Guinness Premiership and the four Welsh regions, ending its status as an open competition. From this time until 2009, teams from the Championship and below played in the Powergen National Trophy.

== List of winners ==
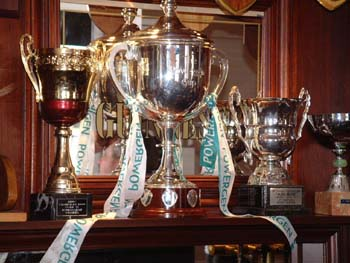
The Powergen Cup (centre) seen in the London Irish clubhouse at Sunbury in 2002

Key to list of winners
Match went to extra time
Cup shared

RFU Knockout Cup
Season	Winners	Score	Runners-up	Venue	Attendance	Ref
1971–72	Gloucester	17–6	Moseley	Twickenham	10,500	
1972–73	Coventry	27–15	Bristol	Twickenham	11,500	
1973–74	Coventry	26–6	London Scottish	Twickenham		
1974–75	Bedford	28–12	Rosslyn Park	Twickenham	18,000	
1975–76	Gosforth	23–14	Rosslyn Park	Twickenham	7,500	
1976–77	Gosforth	27–11	Waterloo	Twickenham	10,000	
1977–78	Gloucester	6–3	Leicester	Twickenham	24,000	
1978–79	Leicester	15–12	Moseley	Twickenham	18,000	
1979–80	Leicester	21–9	London Irish	Twickenham	27,000	
1980–81	Leicester	22–15	Gosforth	Twickenham	24,000	
1981–82	Gloucester	12–12	Moseley	Twickenham	20,000	
1982–83	Bristol	28–22	Leicester	Twickenham	34,000	
1983–84	Bath	10–9	Bristol	Twickenham	25,000	
1984–85	Bath	24–15	London Welsh	Twickenham	32,000	
1985–86	Bath	25–17	Wasps	Twickenham	23,000	
1986–87	Bath	19–12	Wasps	Twickenham	35,500	
1987–88	Harlequins	28–22	Bristol	Twickenham	37,000	
1988–89	Bath	10–6	Leicester	Twickenham	59,300	
1989–90	Bath	48–6	Gloucester	Twickenham	52,000	
1990–91	Harlequins	25–13	Northampton	Twickenham	53,000	
1991–92	Bath	15–12	Harlequins	Twickenham	62,000	
1992–93	Leicester	23–16	Harlequins	Twickenham	54,000	
1993–94	Bath	21–9	Leicester	Twickenham	68,000	
1994–95	Bath	36–16	Wasps	Twickenham		
1995–96	Bath	16–15	Leicester	Twickenham	75,000	
1996–97	Leicester	9–3	Sale	Twickenham	75,000	
1997–98	Saracens	48–18	Wasps	Twickenham	65,000	
1998–99	London Wasps	29–19	Newcastle	Twickenham	50,000	
1999–00	London Wasps	31–23	Northampton	Twickenham	48,000	
2000–01	Newcastle	30–27	Harlequins	Twickenham	71,000	
2001–02	London Irish	38–7	Northampton	Twickenham	75,000	
2002–03	Gloucester	40–22	Northampton	Twickenham	75,000	
2003–04	Newcastle	37–33	Sale	Twickenham	48,519	
2004–05	Leeds Tykes	20–12	Bath	Twickenham	60,300	

=== List of champions ===
#	Team	Wins	Years
1	Bath	10	1984, 1985, 1986, 1987, 1989, 1990, 1992, 1994, 1995, 1996
2	Leicester	5	1979, 1980, 1981, 1993, 1997
3=	Gloucester	4	1972, 1978, 1982*, 2003
3=	Newcastle	4	1976, 1977 (as Gosforth), 2001, 2004
5=	Harlequins	2	1988, 1991
5=	Wasps	2	1999, 2000
5=	Coventry	2	1973, 1974
8=	Saracens	1	1998
8=	Bedford	1	1975
8=	Moseley	1	1982*
8=	Bristol	1	1983
8=	London Irish	1	2002
8=	Leeds Tykes	1	2005

* 1982 title shared between Gloucester and Moseley.

== See also ==
- Anglo-Welsh Cup
- Premiership Rugby Cup
- RFU Championship Cup
- EDF Energy Trophy
- RFU Intermediate Cup
- RFU Senior Vase
- RFU Junior Vase
- Rugby union in England
