= Rowland Winter =

British rugby union coach

- Born: 17 February 1985 (age 41)
- Occupation: coach

Rowland Winter (born 17 February 1985) is a British rugby union coach and Director of Rugby.

== Coaching career ==
=== Early roles ===
Winter began his coaching career at Northampton Saints, in a number of roles within the Junior Academy and Community Development. During his early 20s, Winter enjoyed successful league and cup wins as Head coach at both Northampton BBOB RFC and Bedford Athletic. He had successful coaching experience in the England U-20s Counties structure.

=== Cambridge RFC ===
From February 2013 Winter was appointed Director of Rugby at Cambridge RFC. He restructured all playing aspects of the club over a successful three year period, and led them to win the English National League 2 in 2015-16.

In January 2023, Winter returned to the club in the role of Chief Operating Officer, overseeing all aspects of rugby and commercial operations. In May 2023, the club were promoted to the RFU Championship after a strong second half to the season.

=== RFU County Championship ===
In the 2014-15 season, Winter led the senior Eastern Counties team to a County Cup Final at Twickenham in 2015, the most successful County Cup campaign to date for the CB.

=== Coventry RFC ===
In May 2016 he was appointed Director of Rugby at Coventry RFC, leading them to win the English National League 1 in the 2017-18 season. In May 2018 he signed a contract extension to 2022.

In 2018-19 Winter led Coventry to an 8th place finish, and cup quarter final in their first season back in the Greene King IPA Championship. To date, this is the most successful and highest place finish from any promoted side in the history of the competition.

In 2019-20 Coventry were 4th, when coronavirus halted the Championship.

In January 2022, following a home defeat by Cornish Pirates, Winters whereabouts became a mystery until it was confirmed by the club in April that he had left the club.

Alex Rae was later appointed Head Coach.

=== Methods ===
At both Cambridge and Coventry Winter made significant changes in both the coaching team and playing squad soon after being appointed.

=== St Joseph's College, Ipswich ===
In May 2022 it was announced that Winter had moved to schools rugby coaching, with the appointment as Director of Rugby at St Joseph’s College (Ipswich), before taking on the role of Head of Performance Sport in January 2025.
