= Ian Swan =

Scotland international rugby union player

- Born: John Spence Swan; 14 July 1930 St Andrews, Scotland
- Died: 18 September 2004 (aged 74) St Andrews Scotland
- School: Madras College
- University: University of St Andrews

Rugby union career
- Position: Wing
Amateur team(s)
Years	Team	Apps	(Points)
- St Andrews University
–	Army Rugby Union		
–	London Scottish		
–	Leicester Tigers		
–	Coventry		
International career
Years	Team	Apps	(Points)
1953-58	Scotland	17	(3)

John Spence Swan, known as Ian Swan (14 July 1930 – 18 September 2004) was a Scottish international rugby union player. He played as a Wing.

== Rugby union career ==
=== Amateur career ===
He played rugby at Madras College, his school.

Moving to University, he played rugby for St. Andrews University.

After university Swan joined the Royal Electrical and Mechanical Engineers in the army. He played for the Army Rugby Union side.

Swan played for London Scottish.

In the 1950s the Scotland selectors only considered selection for the national team if the players played in Scotland or for London Scottish. Yet Swan moved to play for the Leicester Tigers which he captained.

Swan then played for Coventry.

=== International career ===
He was capped for Scotland 17 times from 1953 to 1958.

In 1955 he turned down an opportunity to play for the British and Irish Lions.

=== Administration ===
Swan became a Vice President of Hawick then Jedforest.

== Other sports ==
=== Tennis ===
Swan won a Scottish mixed doubles title. He represented the South of Scotland at tennis.

=== Golf ===
A keen golfer, he was a member of the Royal and Ancient Club in St Andrews from 1963. He won the Queen Victoria Jubilee Vase in 1985.

He was also a member of the Castelnaud-de-Gratecambe golf club in Lot et Garonne France.

=== Athletics ===
He represented the Army at athletics.

== Business ==
He became a Director at Pringle in Hawick.

He later launched Kall-Kwik Printing franchises in Edinburgh.
