= Graham Robbins (rugby union) =

English rugby union player (born 1956)

Graham Leslie Robbins (born 24 September 1956) is a former English rugby union player. Robbins played for Coventry as a number eight and won two international caps for the England national rugby union team, both during the 1986 Five Nations Championship.

Robbins captained the Warwickshire county team to win the 1985–86 Rugby Union County Championship, scoring a hat-trick of tries in the final against Kent. At the time Robbins worked as a firefighter at Birmingham Airport.
