= Stan Adkins =

English rugby union player

- Full name: Stanley John Adkins
- Born: 2 June 1922 Coventry, England
- Died: 2 January 1992 (aged 69) Coventry, England

Rugby union career
- Position: Lock / No. 8
International career
Years	Team	Apps	(Points)
1950–53	England	7	(3)

Stanley John Adkins (2 June 1922 - 2 January 1992) was an English international rugby union player.

Born and raised in Coventry, Warwickshire, Adkins began playing rugby while attending Stoke School. He served in the Coldstream Guards during the war and played rugby for Combined Services.

Adkins, known as "Akker", was primarily a second-row forward and made over 300 appearances for Coventry, while also representing Warwickshire. He was capped three times by England in the 1950 Five Nations and gained a further four caps in the 1953 Five Nations, which England won while remaining undefeated.

A publican by profession, Adkins operated several Coventry pubs with his wife Jean.

== See also ==
- List of England national rugby union players
