= David Addleton =

English rugby union player and coach

David Addleton is currently coach at Rugby Lions. He is a former forwards coach and interim head coach of Coventry R.F.C. where he enjoyed a legendary playing career as a hooker between 1989 and 2005.

Addleton made his debut for Coventry against rivals Moseley in September 1989. "Aggie" joined Coventry from local club Barkers Butts and during his career, he also represented Warwickshire, the Midlands, Irish Exiles and the Barbarians.

Career highlights included Coventry's most successful season of the modern era, coming within touching distance of the Premiership in 1997. Along the way, with Addleton an ever-present, they beat a Newcastle Falcons side featuring 15 internationals by 19-18 at Coundon Road. They would eventually finish third to the well- funded Newcastle and champions Richmond but lost a promotion play-off against London Irish despite taking a narrow first leg advantage to Sunbury. There was also the "lost" hat-trick in the forfeited match versus Rotherham.

In his final game for Coventry in April 2005 versus Bedford, Addleton injured his ribs in the first half and had to be taken off, but this injury was sustained as he was scoring his final try for the club. In total, "Aggie" played 354 senior club games for Coventry R.F.C. He was rewarded with a testimonial in 2005.

Addleton continued his work as a Rugby Development Officer in Coventry and Warwickshire schools and was appointed first team forwards coach in January 2006. In November 2006, he was appointed acting head coach following the suspension and subsequent resignation of Mike Umaga. When the new head coach Murray Henderson was appointed, Addleton reverted to the role of Forwards Coach again.

In February 2007, Brett Davey resigned as head coach. Addleton took over and immediately guided the team to better performances.

When Phil Maynard was appointed as head coach in June 2008, Addleton once again returned to the position of Forwards Coach.
