= Ron Jones (rugby union) =

Wales international rugby union player

- Full name: Ronald Elvet Jones
- Born: 24 February 1943 (age 83) Neath, Wales
- School: Neath Grammar School
- University: St Luke's College, Exeter
- Occupation: Teacher

Rugby union career
- Position: Flanker / No. 8
International career
Years	Team	Apps	(Points)
1967–68	Wales	5	(0)

Ronald Elvet Jones (born 24 February 1943) was a Welsh international rugby union player.

Born in Neath, Jones attended Neath Grammar School and was a Welsh Secondary Schools representative player.

A back-row forward, Jones was rugby captain at St Luke's College, Exeter. He appeared for Devon during his time in Exeter and also played some his early rugby at Swansea, with which he faced the touring 1963–64 All Blacks as a 20-year old. Based in England, Jones taught physical education at Bablake School and was a Coventry player at the time of his Wales call up. He won five caps across their 1967 and 1968 Five Nations Championship campaigns.

Jones was later deputy head of Bablake School.

== See also ==
- List of Wales national rugby union players
