= Coventry R.F.C. =

Rugby union club in England

(England) Coventry RFC
- Full name: Coventry Rugby Football Club
- Union: Warwickshire RFU
- Founded: 1874; 152 years ago
- Location: Coventry, West Midlands, England
- Ground: Nick Newbold Stadium (Capacity: 5,250 (3,000 seated))
- Chairman: Jon Sharp
- President: Peter Rossborough
- Captain: Jordon Poole
- League: Champ Rugby
- 2025–26: 3rd of 14 (lost play-offs semi-final)
1st kit	2nd kit

Official website
- coventryrugby.co.uk

Coventry Rugby Football Club is a professional rugby union club based in Coventry, England. The club enjoyed great success during the 1960s and 70s, with many players representing their countries. Coventry's home ground is the Nick Newbold Stadium (formerly known as Butts Park Arena), which opened in 2004. Between 1921 and 2004, the club played at Coundon Road. The club plays in Champ Rugby (the second tier of the English rugby union system) following their promotion from the 2017–18 National League 1.

== History ==
In 1874 a group, including members of Stoke Cricket Club, took part in what could be described as the first organised game of rugby football played in Coventry. Played against Allesley Park College in nearby Allesley, it took the form of one half conducted according to rugby rules and the other according to association rules.

The first headquarters were established at Old Bull Fields and in the formative years Coventry remained pretty well unbeaten. When the ground became enclosed, it became known as the Butts with the first match played there against Stourbridge in 1880. By the late 1890s, involvement began in the Midland Counties Cup which was won a total of five times. The first club captain was Harry Ratliff, who later emigrated to the United States. By now, players were winning representative honours, William Judkins becoming the club's first British Lion in 1899 during the tour to Australia – overall, 10 Coventry players have worn the famous red jersey over the years.

Ben Tuke & H. G. Wells were the club's first internationals, both representing Ireland in 1894.

W. L. Oldham became the first of the club's great forwards of the 20th century to represent England. Early in the century the Butts was lost when the professional Northern Union game took brief hold in the city.

By the end of the First World War, the Butts had been taken over by a local firm and a temporary home was found at the Coventry & North Warwickshire Cricket Ground at Binley Road before Coundon Road was purchased in 1921 and developed as the club's headquarters which was to last for over 80 years. What was considered to be the first golden era of Coventry rugby came in the mid-1920s when losses were infrequent. That brilliance continued and carried over with Coventry producing six England internationals as well as playing a full part in the early Warwickshire successes in the County Championship. Regular representative matches by now were being staged at Coundon Road, at the same time playing successes for the club were continuing built upon local talent including many schools internationals.

The years of the Second World War brought more disruption, but from a playing point of view despite the inevitable difficulties, it became one of the most remarkable periods in the club's history. Many players remained locally for essential war work because of the importance of the city as a key engineering centre, and consequently a record 72 games were won in succession, with a number of players becoming Victory Internationals. All that ensured that when hostilities finished the club was immediately into its stride again as success continued. The early 1950s saw something of a dip in fortune, but it was not to last too long as the club continued to produce many international players, not only for England but also Scotland and Wales. In 1958 the Midlands won their first-ever match against a touring side, some two-thirds of the team which defeated Australia coming from the Coventry club. This was also the time when again Coventry players totally dominated the County side, which saw Warwickshire win the title seven times in eight seasons.

The early 1960s saw the club's players continue to win international honours, indeed by the early 1970s at one time 13 players from the club were representing England. The RFU Club Knock Competition, later to be known as the John Player Cup, was first contested in the 1971–72 season and it would be 1975 before Coventry lost a fixture outright. They were eliminated after a drawn semi-final with Gloucester in the first edition, as the home team in a game of no tries as rules stipulated. They went on to win in consecutive seasons 1972–73 and 1973–74, the second of which coincided with the centenary celebrations. Merit tables were then beginning to come on the scene, the early years seeing the club at the top end of both the England & Wales versions. The 1980s, however, saw a dip in playing fortune and when league rugby was first introduced in 1987 the club spent just one season in what is now known as the Premiership.

The next ten years or so became something of a struggle before the 1996–97 season which would be Coventry's most successful of the modern era, coming within touching distance of the Premiership. Along the way they beat a Newcastle Falcons side featuring 15 internationals by 19–18 at Coundon Road. They would eventually finish third to the well-funded Newcastle and champions Richmond but lost a promotion play-off to London Irish despite taking a narrow first leg advantage to Sunbury. Remarkably considering their second-tier status, both Danny Grewcock and Rob Hardwick were capped by England in this era. It was however to be at severe cost for in a little over twelve months serious financial difficulties hit the club before a rescue package was put together in time for the 1999–2000 season.

By now, however, Coundon Road was in need of considerable investment and after some eighty-four years the decision was made to move away and back full circle to the club's beginnings. The Butts Park Arena saw its first game in September 2004, but again financial difficulties were to bite and it took the considerable efforts of members, supporters, former players and local companies to rescue the situation during the summer of 2008. In December 2009 the club was placed into administration and later in January 2010 brought back out thanks to Jon Bowles. Coventry Rugby Ltd was created at this time and the first Board Of Directors was formed. A 15-point league deduction penalty was applied due to administration and relegation predictably followed from the Championship, with the club regrouping in National League 1 for the 2010–11 season with the club going part-time again. Steady progress followed under the guidance of the Board, with the desired aim being to climb back up the leagues but not at any cost financially.

=== Rivalries ===
The traditional local rivals are Moseley, with whom Cov enjoyed a regular and popular Boxing Day fixture. It was long considered one of English rugby's premier derbies. After decades in the top echelons of the game, both sides competed in the inaugural season of top-tier league rugby when it was instituted in 1987, but have since spent time bouncing between the first, second and third tiers (primarily the latter two). Recently a pre-season friendly has been arranged when the teams are not in the same division. Cardiff and London Welsh were regular visitors to Coundon Road, promoting strong rivalries, with David Duckham scoring the most impressive try of his career against London Welsh in a match in 1973.

=== Summary of league positions ===
Prior to League Rugby, clubs were ranked in Merit Tables, the most prominent for English clubs being the Sunday Telegraph Merit Tables. Coventry were crowned 'winners' 3 times between 1964 and 1987 (70, 73 and 83), making them the joint 2nd most successful English team of the period, alongside Bristol and Leicester Tigers and behind London Welsh.

In 1987 the RFU implemented a National League system.

At the end of the 2022–23 season Coventry finished 3rd in the RFU Championship, the highest finish the club have had in the professional era.

Below is a list summarising Coventry's final league positions:

- 1987–88: Courage National Division 1 (level 1) – 11th (relegated)
- 1988–89: Courage National Division 2 (level 2) – 5th
- 1989–90: Courage National Division 2 – 4th
- 1990–91 Courage National Division 2 – 4th
- 1991–92: Courage National Division 2 – 6th
- 1992–93: Courage National Division 2 – 11th (relegated)
- 1993–94: Courage National Division 3 (level 3) – 1st (promoted / champions)
- 1994–95: Courage National Division 2 – 10th (relegated)
- 1995–96: Courage National Division 3 – 1st (promoted / champions)
- 1996–97: Courage National Division 2 – 3rd (lost promotion play-off)
- 1997–98: Allied Dunbar Premiership 2 (level 2) – 7th
- 1998–99: Allied Dunbar Premiership 2 – 7th
- 1999-00: Allied Dunbar Premiership 2 – 6th
- 2000–01: Jewson National Division 1 (level 2) – 5th
- 2001–02: Jewson National Division 1 – 4th
- 2002–03: Jewson National Division 1 – 6th
- 2003–04: National Division 1 – 12th
- 2004–05: National Division 1 – 6th
- 2005–06: National Division 1 – 10th
- 2006–07: National Division 1 – 10th
- 2007–08: National Division 1 – 9th
- 2008–09: National Division 1 – 9th
- 2009–10: RFU Championship – 11th (relegated)
- 2010–11: National League 1 (level 3) – 8th
- 2011–12: National League 1 – 13th
- 2012–13: National League 1 – 9th
- 2013–14: SSE National League 1 – 4th
- 2014–15: SSE National League 1 – 3rd
- 2015–16: SSE National League 1 – 9th
- 2016–17: SSE National League 1 – 4th
- 2017–18: SSE National League 1 – champions (promoted)
- 2018–19: RFU Championship (level 2) - 8th
- 2019–20: RFU Championship - 4th
- 2020–21: RFU Championship - 5th
- 2021–22: RFU Championship - 8th
- 2022–23: RFU Championship - 3rd
- 2023–24: RFU Championship - 3rd
- 2024–25: RFU Championship - 5th
- 2025–26: RFU Championship - 3rd

== Honours ==
- RFU Knockout Cup winners (2): 1972–1973, 1973–1974
- National League 1 champions (3): 1993–94, 1995–96, 2017–18
- Midland Counties Cup winners (9): 1890–91, 1891–92, 1892–93, 1893–94, 1895–96, 1906–07, 1910–11, 1919–20, 1922–23
- Midland Counties Cup runners Up (7): 1883–84, 1887–88, 1894–95, 1908–09, 1909–10, 1911–12, 1923–24
- Sunday Telegraph National Merit Table winners (3): 1969–70, 1972–73, 1982–83

== Current standings ==
2026–27 Champ Rugby table
Pos	Team	Pld	W	D	L	PF	PA	PD	TF	TA	TB	LB	Pts	Qualification
1	Worcester Warriors	5	5	0	0	246	95	+151	37	14	4	0	24	Play-off semi-finals
2	Ealing Trailfinders	5	4	0	1	242	109	+133	38	16	4	1	21	Play-off semi-finals
3	Coventry	5	4	0	1	243	171	+72	36	26	2	1	19	Play-off quarter-finals
4	Rotherham Titans	5	4	0	1	160	191	−31	25	29	1	0	17	Play-off quarter-finals
5	Ampthill	5	4	0	1	195	195	0	29	29	0	0	16	Play-off quarter-finals
6	Cornish Pirates	5	3	0	2	182	187	−5	27	28	2	0	14	Play-off quarter-finals
7	Chinnor	5	3	0	2	180	183	−3	22	21	1	0	13	
8	Doncaster Knights	5	2	0	3	161	152	+9	24	21	1	2	11	
9	Bedford Blues	5	2	0	3	143	158	−15	22	24	2	1	11	
10	Blackheath	5	1	0	4	146	189	−43	20	27	0	3	7	
11	Caldy	5	1	0	4	176	206	−30	25	31	0	2	6	
12	Nottingham	5	1	0	4	128	206	−78	19	32	0	1	5	Relegation play-off
13	Hartpury	5	1	0	4	116	207	−91	16	31	0	1	5	Relegation play-off
14	Richmond	5	0	0	5	123	192	−69	19	29	0	1	1	Relegated

First match(es) will be played: 18 September 2026. Source:
Rules for classification: If teams are level at any stage, tiebreakers are applied in the following order:
1. Number of matches won
2. Number of matches drawn
3. Difference between points for and against
4. Total number of points for
5. Aggregate number of points scored in matches between tied teams
6. Number of matches won excluding the first match, then the second and so on until the tie is settled

== Current coaches ==
- Head Coach – Alex Rae
- Attack & Backs Coach – Gordon Ross
- Forwards Coach – Alex Rae
- Defence Coach – James Scaysbrook
- Team Manager – Matthew Cannon

== Current squad ==
The Coventry squad for the 2025–26 season is:

Coventry 2025–26 Champ Rugby squad
**Props**: (Spain) Aristot Benz-Salomon; (Spain) Jono Benz-Salomon; (England) Sam Gibson; (England) Matt Johnson; (England) Keston Lines; (England) Eliot Salt; (England) Toby Trinder; **Hookers**: (England) Murray Davidson; (England) Suva Ma'asi; (England) Jordan Poole; **Locks**: (Scotland) Allan Ferrie; (England) Dan Green; (England) Dylan Morris; (England) Jack Shine	**Back row**: (England) Tom Ball; (England) Mackenzie Graham; (England) Onisivoro Nayagi; (England) Senitiki Nayalo; (England) Chester Owen; (Wales) Morgan Strong; **Scrum-halves**: (England) Josh Barton; (England) Sam Maunder; (England) Tom Miles; **Fly-halves**: (England) Tommy Mathews; (Wales) Josh Thomas	**Centres**: (England) Morgan Adderley-Jones; (Ireland) Oli Morris; (England) Api Bavadra; (Wales) Dafydd-Rhys Tiueti; **Wings**: (England) David Opoku-Fordjour; (Ireland) Peter Sullivan; **Fullbacks**: (England) Tomas Bacon; (England) Ewan Baker
**(c)** denotes the team captain. (vc) denotes vice-captain. **Bold** denotes internationally capped players.^{ST} denotes a short-term signing. Source:

== Academy ==
In conjunction with Moulton College, the club jointly runs the Coventry Rugby Academy. It "...provides an educational and player pathway for talented rugby players to progress to the Coventry Rugby Club 1st team and development team squads".

== Abridged recent history ==
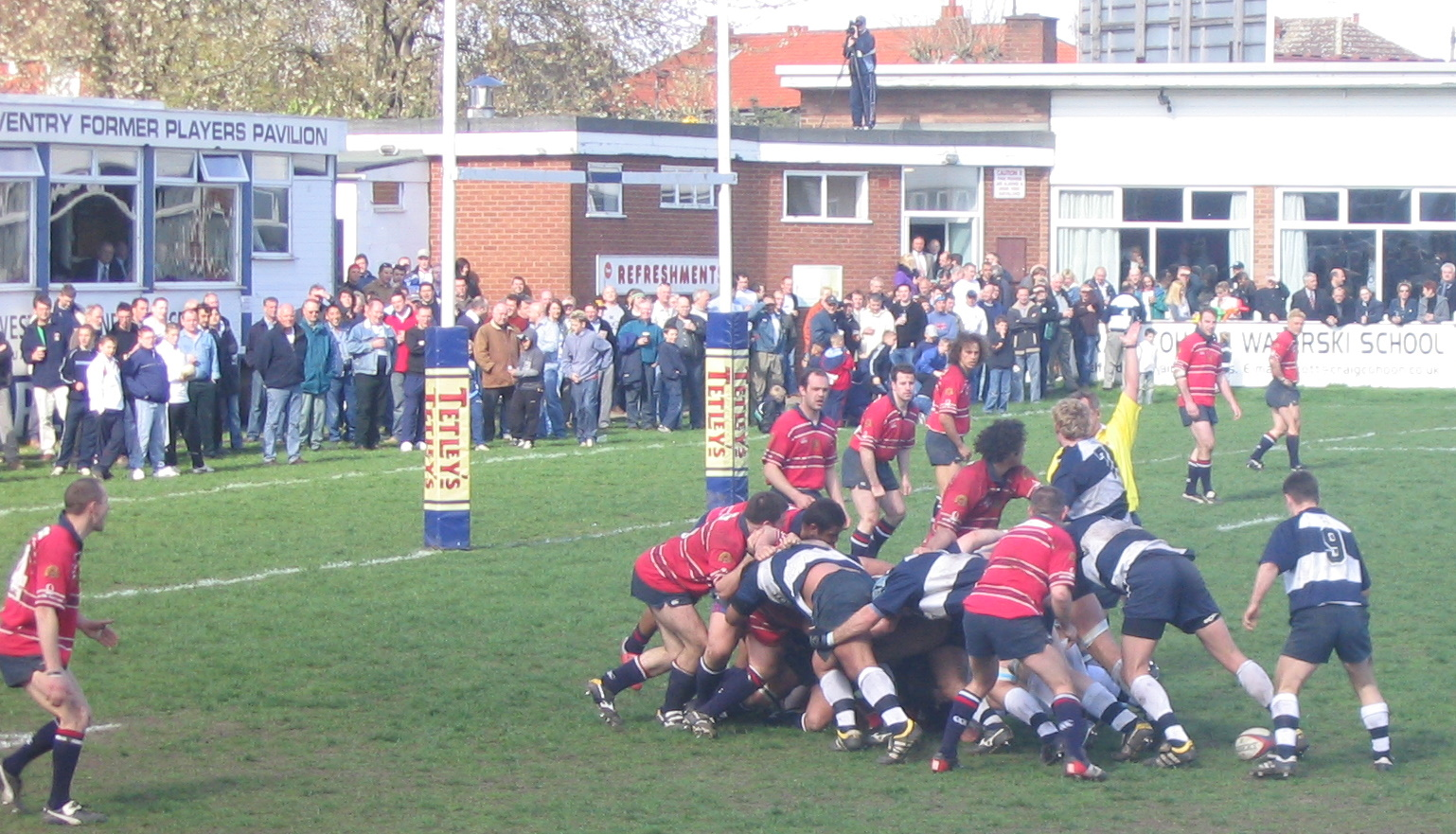
Coventry playing their last ever match at Coundon Road in April 2004.

=== 1998–2006 seasons ===
In 1998, Keith Fairbrother, a former player for the club, became chairman. Fairbrother took over the club after it had gone into receivership that year (a role he would hold for eight years). In April 2004, Coventry played its final game at Coundon Road, its home for 83 years.

=== 2006–2010 : Under the ownership of Andrew Green ===
On 23 August 2006, Andrew Green became the new owner and chairman of the club when he bought the controlling company (Butts Park Ventures (Coventry) Ltd) from Keith Fairbrother. Green was a former player and chief executive of Reading.

Apoua Stewart, the Samoan international full back, was suspended for two years on 1 November 2006 after testing positive for the banned stimulant ephedrine. In doing so, he became the first Coventry player to fail a drug test. Stewart gave a positive sample after the game against Earth Titans at the Butts Park Arena on 9 September 2006. He admitted the offence when he appeared before a Rugby Football Union disciplinary panel at the Filton Holiday Inn Hotel in Bristol.

On 15 November 2006, the coach Mike Umaga, older brother of Tana Umaga, was also suspended following unspecified allegations. He resigned a fortnight later on 27 November 2006. Murray Henderson was appointed.

The following season, after a series of poor results, Coventry announced that Henderson would be moved within the club from 17 December 2007. Phil Maynard took over coaching responsibilities.

On 1 December 2009, it was reported that club owner Andrew Green had put the club into voluntary liquidation. It was later reported that this attempt had failed and that the club would instead go into administration. On 8 January 2010 it was announced that the club had come out of administration with the formation of a new company Coventry Rugby Ltd with investment from businessman Jon Bowles.

=== 2010–2016: National League One Rugby ===
The 2010–11 season saw the return of Phil Maynard, and although the club were relegated to National League 1, the management saw him as the man to start the new era at Coventry Rugby Club. A whole new squad was formed, alongside new coaching staff for the 2010–2011 with the aim of avoiding consecutive relegation's.

Although it was announced that the 2011–12 budget would be lower than that of the previous season, the starting squad for 2011–12 appeared to contain more players vying for first XV team football. Mid-Season, Peter Rossborough stepped aside for Jon Sharpe to become Club Chairman

The 2012–13 season ended with Coventry in 9th place in National League 1. Following this, for the start of the 2013–14 season, ex-Wales international lock Scott Morgan become head coach, while retaining a playing role.

The following season, on 29 March 2014, Cliffie Hodgson broke the club's all-time point-scoring record, beating Steve Gough's record which had stood since the 1998–99 season. A 4th-placed finish was Coventry's most competitive season since being relegated into National League One. Inconsistent away form prevented them from truly challenging for promotion.

During the 2014–15 season, on 24 January 2015, Coventry beat their previous wartime record for consecutive victories with a 32–22 home win over Cinderford. The winning run of 16 games ended with a 28–28 draw away at Richmond on 31 January 2015. The unbeaten run continued for another fortnight eventually reaching 18 games. It put the team in a position to challenge the league's only full-time professional side Ealing, who they'd beaten on the run, for the top spot before results tailed off. Coventry finished 3rd.

Following the improvement of the previous campaign and an ambitious recruitment policy over the summer, there was optimism for a serious promotion push in 2015–2016. A crushing 50-point pre-season victory against famous old foes Cardiff and bonus point wins in the opening two league fixtures reinforced ambitions. However, a series of disappointing and unexpected results, poor form and injuries saw Cov drop into the bottom half of the table where they remained. In early 2016 it was announced Rowland Winter would become the club's full- time Director of Rugby for the 2016–17 season. In February 2016 Cliffie Hodgson became the first Coventry player to exceed 1,000 points in league rugby.

=== 2016– : The Rowland Winter Era ===
New Director of Rugby Rowland Winter made wholesale changes to the club's culture, playing and backroom staff prior to the 2016–17 season. A starting XV of entirely new players turned out in the opening league fixture, a 54–14 win versus Loughborough. Narrow defeats and poor away form hampered progress before steady improvement in the second half of the season, the highlight of an 8-game winning streak to finish the season being a 26–23 home derby win over Moseley in front of 2,712 supporters. Coventry finished Winter's first season in 4th place.

Ahead of his second campaign Winter retained the core of the squad adding quality and experience including the All Black centre Sam Tuitupou from Sale Sharks, Phil Nilsen from Leeds, England International Luke Narraway from London Irish, Tonga's Latu Makaafi from Doncaster, Jack Preece, Scotland's Alex Grove, Dave Brazier and George Oram (all from local rivals Moseley) and Nile Dacres from fellow promotion chasers Plymouth Albion. In September it was announced club legend (record league points scorer and player to record most league wins as captain) Cliffie Hodgson was being released to join Broadstreet as a player-coach. On 21 October, Coventry beat Loughborough to record 8 consecutive wins at the start of the new season. In doing so, they equalled the 16-game run of the 2014–15 season. A week later the run was extended to 17 with a win against Cambridge that saw Cov come within 2 minutes of keeping a 3rd consecutive clean sheet. A win away at Moseley on 23 December completed a perfect first half of the season, 15 victories in 15 matches.

On 17 March 2018, Coventry beat Caldy 55–12 to clinch the league title and win promotion to the Championship, all with five games still left to play.

=== The Championship ===
Marquee pre-season friendly victories over local rivals, old and new, preceded Cov's return to The Championship. Traditional rivals, Moseley were beaten 62–14 whilst a Wasps XV were despatched 55–14.

A winning return to the second tier was achieved a week later with a 20–15 victory over Jersey Reds at The Butts Park Arena, a monumental effort considering 2 yellow cards saw Coventry reduced to 13 at one stage.

That opening day win was followed up by another win next time out at home against Bedford Blues, and then giving eventual title-winners London Irish a massive scare in front of a fervent Butts Park Arena crowd. The home form was key to Coventry establishing themselves back in the Championship at the first time of asking, and while there were agonising late defeats to Nottingham and Bedford – a thriller that saw the teams share over 100 points between them – the season finished on a high with away wins against Doncaster and Jersey and an eighth-place finish.

Sam Tuitupou and Phil Nilsen both retired at the end of the season, but the squad has been bolstered with the addition of a number of experienced players, namely Joe Buckle (hooker, Yorkshire Carnegie), Ryan Burrows (back row, Newcastle), Gareth Denman (prop, Gloucester), Andy Forsyth (centre, Yorkshire Carnegie), Rory Jennings (fly half, London Scottish), Senitiki Nayolo (back row, Edinburgh) and Stan South (second row, Harlequins), with former England centre Anthony Allen joining from Leicester Tigers as defence coach.

In November 2024, Coventry beat Leicester Tigers 33–19 in the Premiership Rugby Cup. This was their first win at Welford Road since 1992.

== Notable former players ==
Coventry was one of the premier rugby clubs in the UK in the 1960s and 1970s and many of its players were capped during that time for England. Some notable ex-Coventry players are:

- (England) Phil Judd
- (England) George Cole
- (England) Bill Gittings
- (England) Peter Rossborough
- (England) John Barton
- (England) Barry Ninnes
- (England) Keith Fairbrother
- (England) Geoff Evans
- (England) Peter Preece
- (England) Alan Cowman
- (England) Graham Robbins
- (England) Fran Cotton
- (England) David Duckham
- (England) John Gray
- (England) Brian Holt
- Steve Thomas
- (England) David Addleton
- (England) Adam Balding
- (New Zealand) Zinzan Brooke
- (New Zealand) Sam Tuitupou
- (England) Richard Cockerill
- (England) Andy Goode
- (England) Matt Goode
- (England) Rob Hardwick
- (England) Danny Grewcock
- (England) James Grindal
- (England) Tom Johnson
- (England) Barrie-Jon Mather
- (England) Shaun Perry
- (Barbados) Kurt Johnson
- (Tonga) Patrick Pellegrini
- (England) Peter Robbins
- (England) Alan Rotherham
  (IRB Hall of Fame inductee)
- (Wales) Clem Thomas
- (Samoa) Mike Umaga
- (Scotland) Ian Swan

== Previous coaches ==
- 2016–2022 Rowland Winter (DOR)
- 2013–2016 Scott Morgan
- 2008–2013 Phil Maynard (DOR)
- 2008 David Addleton (acting)
- 2008 Brett Davey
- 2007 Murray Henderson
- 2006 David Addleton (acting)
- 2005–2006 Mike Umaga
- 2004–2005 Steve Williams
- 2004 John White
- 2003 Mark Donato
- 2002–2003 Mark Ellis
- 2000–2002 Peter Rossborough
- 2000 Harry Roberts
- 1999 Keith Richardson
- 1997–1999 Derek Eves

== Players gaining international honours ==
The following players have played for their country while playing for Coventry. Unless otherwise noted, all played for England.

- 1894
  - (Ireland) BB Tuke
  - (Ireland) HG Wells
- 1895
  - (Ireland) BB Tuke
- 1899
  - (British Isles XV) H.G.S. Gray
- 1908
  - WL Oldham
- 1909
  - WL Oldham
- 1927
  - T Coulson
- 1928
  - T Coulson
- 1932
  - AJ Rowley
  - RS Roberts
- 1935
  - AJ Clarke
  - JL Giles
- 1936
  - AJ Clarke
  - HF Wheatley
- 1937
  - JL Giles
  - HF Wheatley
  - A Wheatley
- 1938
  - HF Wheatley
  - A Wheatley
  - JL Giles
- 1939
  - HF Wheatley
- 1946 Victory Internationals
  - HF Greasley (C)
  - H Pateman
  - NJ Stock
  - HF Wheatley
- 1947
  - H Walker
- 1948
  - H Walker
- 1948
  - I Preece
- 1949
  - I Preece (C)
- 1950
  - I Preece (C)
  - SJ Adkins
- 1951
  - I Preece
  - EN Hewitt
- 1953
  - SJ Adkins
  - (Wales) RCC Thomas
- 1954
  - E Robinson
- 1956
  - DF Allison
  - PB Jackson
  - PGD Robbins
  - (Scotland) JS Swan
- 1957
  - DF Allison
  - PB Jackson
  - PGD Robbins
  - (Scotland) JS Swan
- 1958
  - DF Allison
  - PB Jackson
  - PGD Robbins
- 1959
  - HO Godwin
  - PB Jackson
- 1961
  - J Price
  - E Robinson
  - PB Jackson
- 1962
  - PE Judd
  - TA Pargetter
  - PGD Robbins
- 1963
  - HO Godwin
  - PB Jackson
  - PE Judd
  - JE Owen
  - TA Pargetter
  - BJ Wightman
- 1964
  - HO Godwin
  - PE Judd
  - JE Owen
- 1965
  - PE Judd
  - JE Owen
- 1966
  - JE Owen
  - PE Judd
- 1967
  - PE Judd (C)
  - Doug Wright
  - J Barton
  - RE Webb
  - (Wales) RE Jones
- 1968
  - PE Judd (C)
  - JE Owen
  - HO Godwin
  - WJ Gittings
  - RE Webb
  - (Wales) RE Jones
- 1969
  - DJ Duckham
  - KE Fairbrother
  - RE Webb
  - TJ Dalton
- 1970
  - DJ Duckham
  - KE Fairbrother
- 1970/71
  - J Gray
- 1971
  - DJ Duckham
  - KE Fairbrother
  - PA Rossborough
  - BF Ninnes
  - RN Creed
- 1972
  - DJ Duckham
  - RE Webb
  - J Barton
  - GW Evans
  - PS Preece
- 1973
  - DJ Duckham
  - PS Preece
  - AR Cowman
  - GW Evans
  - FE Cotton
  - PA Rossborough
- 1974
  - GW Evans
  - PA Rossborough
  - FE Cotton
  - DJ Duckham
- 1975
  - PA Rossborough
  - PS Preece
  - FE Cotton (C)
  - DJ Duckham
- 1976
  - DJ Duckham
  - PS Preece
  - BJ Corless
- 1981
  - GH Davies
  - WMH Rose
- 1982
  - GH Davies
  - WMH Rose
- 1984
  - SE Brain
- 1985
  - SE Brain
- 1986
  - GL Robbins
- 1988
  - (Luxembourg) R Guilfoyle ( (Munster) )
- 1996
  - CN Quick (Wales)
- 1994
  - RJK Hardwick
- 1997
  - DJ Grewcock
- 1999
  - (Samoa) M Mika
- 2001
  - (Tonga) E Vunipola
  - (Barbados) K Johnson
- 2003
  - (Chile) Cristobal Berti
  - (Canada) J Barker
  - (Scotland) I Nimmo
- 2004
  - (Canada) J Cannon
  - (Scotland) I Nimmo
- 2005
  - (Canada) J Cannon
  - (Canada) N Witkowski
  - (Barbados) K Johnson
  - (Samoa) D Farani
  - (Tonga) K Pulu
- 2006
  - (Barbados) K Johnson
  - (Samoa) A Stewart
- 2011
  - (Portugal) J le Roux
- 2012
  - (Portugal) J le Roux

This information was originally taken from display boards inside the clubhouse on 15 October 2006.
