= 1986–87 John Player Cup =

Rugby cup

Tournament statistics

The 1986–87 John Player Special Cup was the 16th edition of England's premier rugby union club competition at the time. Bath won the competition for the fourth consecutive year defeating Wasps in a repeat of the previous year's final. The event was sponsored by John Player cigarettes and the final was held at Twickenham Stadium.

== Draw and results ==
=== First round ===
Team one	Team two	Score
Askeans	Sudbury	6-12
Berry Hill	Lydney	3-8
Birkenhead Park	Fylde	22-27
Birmingham	Leighton Buzzard	11-20
Durham	Preston Grasshoppers	14-3
Lichfield	Tynedale	19-9
London Welsh	Metropolitan Police	18-6
Maidstone	Havant	18-4
Old Reigatians	KCSOB	10-9
Oxford	Exeter	9-28
Paviors	Syston	25-16
Rugby	Dixonians	21-9
St Ives	Marlow	16-6
Saffron Walden	Blackheath	9-14
Solihull	Stourbridge	10-9
Swindon	Camborne	7-23
Taunton	Reading	3-15
Wigton	Liverpool St Helens	6-18
West Hartlepool	Morley	22-6
Worthing	Hartford	20-6

=== Second round ===
Team one	Team two	Score
Fylde	Liverpool St Helens	4-4*
Leighton Buzzard	Lichfield	12-43
Lydney	Camborne	11-9
Maidstone	London Welsh	3-25
Old Reigatians	Exeter	12-3
Paviors	Durham	12-10
Reading	Sudbury	9-6
Rugby	Blackheath	12-9
West Hartlepool	Solihull	17-10
Worthing	St Ives	15-4

Away team progress*

=== Third round ===
Team one	Team two	Score
Bath	Plymouth Albion	32-10
Bristol	Bedford	33-3
Coventry	Reading	26-12
Gosforth	Waterloo	10-9
Lydney	Nottingham	3-32
Liverpool St Helens	Lichfield	12-7
London Irish	Richmond	3-9
London Scottish	Worthing	29-12
London Welsh	Paviors	12-6
Moseley	Vale of Lune	22-10
Old Reigatians	Saracens	12-10
Rosslyn Park	Leicester	15-18
Rugby	Wasps	3-41
Sale	Orrell	12-22
Wakefield	Harlequins	3-3*
West Hartlepool	Gloucester	12-16

Away team progress*

=== Fourth round ===
Team one	Team two	Score
Bath	London Welsh	30-4
Coventry	Liverpool St Helens	29-22
Gloucester	Old Reigatians	18-6
Leicester	Gosforth	19-6
Moseley	London Scottish	31-6
Orrell	Harlequins	12-10
Richmond	Bristol	3-18
Wasps	Nottingham	25-10

=== Quarter-finals ===
Team one	Team two	Score
Bath	Moseley	12-3
Bristol	Leicester	7-17
Orrell	Gloucester	16-10
Wasps	Coventry	19-7

=== Semi-finals ===
Team one	Team two	Score
Orrell	Bath	7-31
Wasps	Leicester	13-6

=== Final ===
2 May 1987

Bath	19–12	Wasps
Try: Redman 2 Halliday; Con: Barnes 2 Pen: Barnes		Try: Davies; Con: Andrew; Pen: Davies; Drop: Andrew

Twickenham Stadium, London
Attendance: 35,500
Referee: Fred Howard (Liverpool)

Bath
Wasps

16	Chris Martin
15	Tony Swift
14	John Palmer
12	Simon Halliday
11	Barry Trevaskis
10	Stuart Barnes
9	Richard Hill (c)
8	Dave Egerton
7	Andy Robinson
6	Nigel Redman
5	John Morrison
4	Jon Hall
3	Gareth Chilcott
2	Graham Dawe
1	David Sole
Replacements:
16	Phil Cue
17	Jeremy Guscott
18	Steve Knight
19	Greg Bess for Dawes
20	Maurice 'Richard' Lee
21	Paul Simpson
Coach:
Jack Rowell

15	Huw Davies
14	Simon Smith
13	Kevin Simms
12	Rob Lozowski
11	Mark Bailey
10	Rob Andrew
9	Steve Bates
8	Mark Rose
7	David Pegler (c)
6	John Bonner
5	Mike Pinnegar
4	Mark Rigby
3	Jeff Probyn
2	Alan Simmons
1	Paul Rendall
Replacements:
16	Andy Barnard
17	Roger Pellow
18	Nick Pratt
19	Keith Bartholomew
20	Martin Brooks
21	Sean O'Leary
Coach:
