= 1981–82 John Player Cup =

English rugby cup

Tournament statistics

The 1981–82 John Player Cup was the 11th edition of England's premier rugby union club competition at the time. Gloucester and Moseley shared the title after playing out a 12-12 draw in the final. The event was sponsored by John Player cigarettes and the final was held at Twickenham Stadium.

== Draw and results ==
=== First round ===
| Team one | Team two | Score |
|---|---|---|
| Liverpool | Morpeth | 19-3 |
| Birkenhead Park | Hartlepool Rovers | 6-7 |
| Aspatria | Roundhay | 0-19 |
| Northampton | Kettering | |
| Bournemouth | St Ives | 10-18 |
| Dartfordians | Hertford | 4-11 |
| Dudley Kingswinford | Nuneaton | 9-27 |
| Exeter University | Lydney | 12-13 |
| High Wycombe | Newbury | 13-0 |
| Saracens | US Portsmouth | 10-4 |
| Woodford | Old Gaytonians | 19-6 |
| Weston-super-Mare | Oxford | 6-9 |
| Walsall | Westleigh | 24-15 |
| Lewes | Streatham-Croydon | 19-0 |

=== Second round ===
| Team one | Team two | Score |
|---|---|---|
| Blackheath | Woodford | 13-0 |
| Hertford | Lydney | 10-13 |
| Lewes | St Ives | 0-10 |
| Nuneaton | Roundhay | 10-7 |
| Matson | Thurrock | 12-12* |
| Oxford | High Wycombe | 9-10 |
| Stamford | Liverpool | 3-15 |
| Stourbridge | Hartlepool Rovers | 9-19 |
| Walsall | Northampton | 9-32 |
| London Irish | Saracens | 19-3 |

Away team progress*

=== Third round ===
| Team one | Team two | Score |
|---|---|---|
| Exeter | Thurrock | 7-0 |
| Bath | Rosslyn Park | 9-11 |
| London Welsh | Lydney | 16-3 |
| Northampton | Morley | 12-7 |
| Waterloo | Nuneaton | 3-0 |
| St Ives | Bristol | 6-16 |
| Richmond | Metropolitan Police | 10-20 |
| Blackheath | London Scottish | 3-16 |
| Gloucester | High Wycombe | 40-6 |
| Nottingham | Sale | 9-15 |
| Moseley | Harrogate | 17-4 |
| Leicester | Hartlepool Rovers | 53-19 |
| London Irish | Coventry | 7-10 |
| Orrell | Liverpool | 12-15 |
| Harlequins | Wasps | 19-10 |
| Bedford | Gosforth | 3-14 |

=== Fourth round ===
| Team one | Team two | Score |
|---|---|---|
| Gloucester | Exeter | 34-3 |
| Sale | Rosslyn Park | 19-3 |
| Moseley | London Welsh | 25-9 |
| Leicester | Northampton | 23-10 |
| Coventry | Waterloo | 29-9 |
| Liverpool | Bristol | 12-10 |
| Harlequins | Metropolitan Police | 28-6 |
| Gosforth | London Scottish | 26-19 |

=== Quarter-finals ===
| Team one | Team two | Score |
|---|---|---|
| Gloucester | Sale | 13-6 |
| Moseley | Liverpool | 15-13 |
| Coventry | Harlequins | 24-12 |
| Leicester | Gosforth | 18-9 |

=== Semi-finals ===
| Team one | Team two | Score |
|---|---|---|
| Moseley | Leicester | 12-4 |
| Coventry | Gloucester | 9-18 |

=== Final ===
1 May 1982

| Gloucester | 12–12 | Moseley |
| Pen: Ford 4 | | Pen: Perry 3 Drop: Perry |

Twickenham Stadium, London
Attendance: 20,000
Referee: Roger Quittenton (Sussex)

Gloucester
Moseley

| 15 | Paul Ford |
| 14 | Philip Pritchard |
| 13 | Paul Taylor |
| 12 | Steven Parsloe |
| 11 | Richard Mogg |
| 10 | Leslie Jones |
| 9 | Steve Baker |
| 1 | Malcolm Preedy |
| 2 | Steve Mills (c) |
| 3 | Phil Blakeway |
| 4 | Steve Boyle |
| 5 | John Orwin |
| 6 | John Gadd |
| 8 | Mike Teague |
| 7 | Mike Longstaff |
Replacements:
| 16 | Nick Price |
| 17 | Gary Thomas |
| 18 | Paul Wood for Longstaff (65m) |
| 19 | John Fidler |
| 20 | Gordon Sargent for Preedy (41m) |
| 21 | Kevin White |
Coach:
Dick Smith

| 15 | Martin Cooper |
| 14 | John Goodwin |
| 13 | Jon Desborough |
| 12 | Dave Shorrock |
| 11 | Richard Lawson |
| 10 | Mike Perry |
| 9 | Steve Sutherland |
| 1 | Trevor Corless |
| 2 | Gary Cox |
| 3 | Steve Acaster |
| 4 | John Davidson |
| 5 | Al Recardo |
| 6 | Dave Warren |
| 8 | Derek Nutt (c) |
| 7 | Nick Jeavons |
Replacements:
| 16 | Phil Millington |
| 17 | Steve Morley |
| 18 | Ian Metcalfe |
| 19 | Bob Barr |
| 20 | Kevin Astley |
| 21 | Alan Thomas |
Coach:
