= Bill Gittings =

England international rugby union player

- Full name: William John Gittings
- Born: 5 October 1938 Coventry, Warwickshire, England
- Died: 6 February 2019 (aged 80) Exeter, New Hampshire, United States

Rugby union career
- Position: Scrum-half
International career
Years	Team	Apps	(Points)
1967	England	1	(0)

William John Gittings (5 October 1938 – 6 February 2019) was an English international rugby union player.

Gittings was educated at Barkers Butt School while growing up in Coventry.

A scrum-half, Gittings started his career at Barkers Butts and made over 300 appearances for Coventry, with which he featured in back to back RFU Knockout Cup wins. He was in the Midland & Home Counties side that played the touring 1967 All Blacks and a week later was capped for England against the same opponent at Twickenham.

Gittings emigrated to the United States to be closer to his daughters.

== See also ==
- List of England national rugby union players
