= Jean-Louis Bérot =

France international rugby union player (1947–2025)

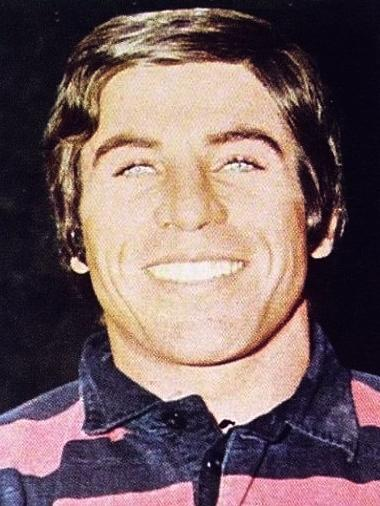
- Born: 28 July 1947 Dax, France
- Died: 23 September 2025 (aged 78) Saint-Laurent-de-Gosse, France
- Height: 1.78 m (5 ft 10 in)
- Weight: 78 kg (172 lb)

Rugby union career
- Position: Fly-half
Senior career
Years	Team	Apps	(Points)
1964–1973	Toulouse		
1973–1974	Dax		
International career
Years	Team	Apps	(Points)
1968–1974	France	21	(23)
Coaching career
- Years: Team
- 1979–1981: Dax
- 1983–1985: Dax

Jean-Louis Bérot (French: [ʒɑ̃lwi beʁo]; 28 July 1947 – 23 September 2025) was a French rugby union international.

== Biography ==
=== Background ===
Bérot hailed from the town of Dax and was a product of hometown club US Dax. He died on 23 September 2025, at the age of 78.

=== Career ===
A Stade Toulousain and US Dax fly-half, Bérot was capped 21 times for France, debuting against the All Blacks at Eden Park on the 1968 southern hemisphere tour. He also toured South Africa in 1971, then Australia once more the following year. In France's 1974 Five Nations match against Ireland, Bérot scored the match-winning penalty in injury time, a difficult kick from over 40 yards out on an angle to the right, but still lost his place for the next match and was never capped again.

== See also ==
- List of France national rugby union players
