= Ernie Robinson (rugby union) =

England international rugby union player

- Full name: Ernest Frederick Robinson
- Born: 17 January 1926 Coventry, England
- Died: 2 July 1993 (aged 67) Coventry, England

Rugby union career
- Position: Hooker
International career
Years	Team	Apps	(Points)
1954–61	England	4	(0)

Ernest Frederick Robinson (17 January 1926 – 2 July 1993) was an English international rugby union player.

A hooker, Robinson attained four England caps during his career. He made his debut in England's Calcutta Cup win over Scotland at Murrayfield in the 1954 Five Nations, deputising for Eric Evans, then gained a recall in 1961 to play a further three Five Nations matches, after which he announced his retirement.

Robinson was a stalwart of his hometown team Coventry RFC, for which he earned captaincy honours in 1956/57 and made over 300 appearances, before serving the club as an administrator.

== See also ==
- List of England national rugby union players
