= Roger Creed =

England international rugby union player

- Full name: Roger Norman Creed
- Born: 19 November 1945 (age 80) Solihull, Warwickshire, England

Rugby union career
- Position: Flanker
International career
Years	Team	Apps	(Points)
1971	England	1	(0)

Roger Norman Creed (born 19 November 1945) is an English former rugby union international.

Raised in Solihull, Creed attended Solihull School and played rugby for Silhillians.

Creed played as a number eight with Moseley early in his career but struggled to establish himself in that position, before gaining regular selection at Coventry as a flanker. It was from Coventry that he earned an England call up in 1971 for the Presidents Overseas XV match at Twickenham, for which caps were awarded. This was to celebrate 100 years of the Rugby Football Union and remained his only England cap. He later moved north and captained Sale.

== See also ==
- List of England national rugby union players
