= Peter Jackson (rugby union) =

British Lions & England international rugby union player

Peter Jackson (22 September 1930, in Birmingham – 22 March 2004 (aged 73), in Solihull) was an England rugby union international who played on the wing for Coventry and Warwickshire for many years.

He earned the nickname 'Nijinsky' after the Russian ballet dancer. He was devastating when he had the ball to hand and could sidestep or outpace a defender with equal facility.

He scored three tries in the 1957 Five Nations Championship and helped England to their first Grand Slam since the Twenties. In 1958 against Australia at Twickenham, he demonstrated his mastery of the feint to score a dazzling match-winning try. He was capped twenty times in all for England.

He then amazed the All Blacks on the 1959 Lions tour, scoring 16 tries in 14 games, including four test matches. He was described by one journalist as 'the zaniest runner of all time'.

Peter Jackson suffered a stroke in the early months of 2003, was hospitalised and would suffer another stroke in the summer of 2003. He died in hospital in March 2004.
