= John Watkins (Royal Navy officer) =

Royal Navy admiral & England international rugby union player

Rear-Admiral John Watkins CB OBE
- Born: John Kingdon Watkins; 24 February 1913; Taunton, England
- Died: 13 May 1970 (aged 57); St Marylebone, England
- Alma mater: Epsom College

Rugby union career
- Position: Wing-forward
International career
Years	Team	Apps	(Points)
1939	England	3	(0)

Rear-Admiral John Kingdon Watkins CB OBE (24 February 1913 – 13 May 1970) was a Royal Navy officer and England international rugby union player of the 1930s.

Born in Taunton, Watkins was a Navy and Somerset wing-forward, capped three times for England in the 1939 Home Nations, the tournament's final edition before being suspended during the war.

Watkins was mentioned in dispatches serving with the Royal Navy in World War II. He held several high ranking positions after the war and in 1965 was promoted to the rank of Rear-Admiral. At his retirement in 1967, Watkins was made a Companion of the Order of the Bath for his military service.

== See also ==
- List of England national rugby union players
