= Jimmy Giles (rugby union) =

British Lions & England international rugby union player

- Full name: James Leonard Giles
- Born: 5 January 1910 Coventry, England
- Died: 28 March 1967 (aged 57) Coventry, England

Rugby union career
- Position: Scrum-half
International career
Years	Team	Apps	(Points)
1935–38	England	6	(6)
1938	British Lions	2	(0)

James Leonard Giles (5 January 1910 – 28 March 1967) was an English international rugby union player.

Born and raised in Coventry, Giles was educated at South Street School, from where he gained England Schoolboys representative honours. He joined the Coventry RFC club after finishing school and had several seasons as an understudy to scrum-half Albert Gascoigne, before taking over the position in 1933-34, when his rival switched to rugby league.

Giles gained six caps for England playing in the Home Nations between 1935 and 1938, which included two matches in their 1937 triple crown-winning campaign. He took part in the 1938 British Lions tour to South Africa, where he featured in two of the three matches against the Springboks. After appearing in the series opener at Ellis Park, Giles missed the next match, then replaced Basil Nicholson for the final fixture at Newlands, playing out of position at centre. He captained Warwickshire to their historic first County Championship title in 1939.

== See also ==
- List of British & Irish Lions players
- List of England national rugby union players
