= Murray Henderson (rugby union) =

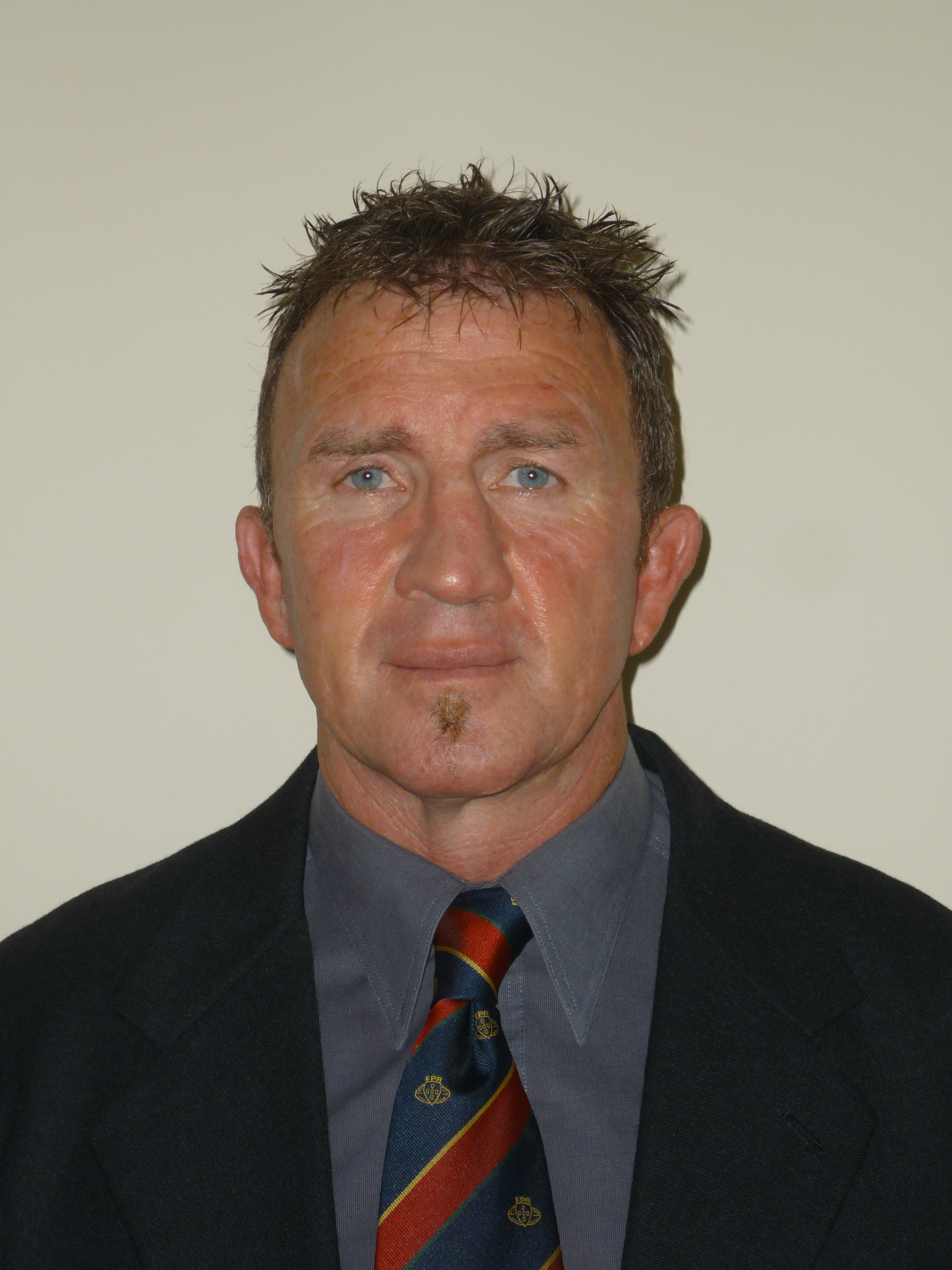
- Born: 13 August 1959 (age 67) Wellington, New Zealand

Rugby union career
- Position: Flanker
Provincial / State sides
Years	Team	Apps	(Points)
- Manawatu
-	Canterbury		
-	Nelson Bays		
Coaching career
- Years: Team
- Sanyo Wild Knights
- –: Kanto Gakuin University
- –: Coventry R.F.C.
- –: Oxford University Blues

Murray Henderson (born 13 August 1959 in Wellington) is a rugby union coach and former player from New Zealand. He played club rugby at the provincial level and represented his country though not at Test level. After his retirement as player he became a professional coach; he trained club, university and national sides.

== Early career ==
Henderson joined the New Zealand Army cadets in 1976. A series of promotions led to his appointment as Head Cadet and Regimental Sergeant Major. Following the completion of the two-year programme, he joined the Regular Forces Engineer Corps and completed a carpentry apprenticeship. His career in the Army spanned 20 years during which time he worked on commercial construction projects, field engineering including demolitions and civilian aid projects in the South Pacific. His ability to teach was recognised, with forays into physical education as an Assistant Physical Training Instructor and into teaching, as an instructor at the School of Military Engineering. His people skills and range of experiences within the army led him into Army Recruiting, ultimately being based at the National Office overseeing regional recruiting. During his time in the Army, Henderson played both NZ Army and NZ Combined Services Rugby.

Henderson retired from the Army following 20 years' service and qualified as a Les Mills Personal Trainer prior to setting up a sports consulting company. The key focus for this company was personal training, rugby team fitness and team building for both NZ and overseas teams. The focus broadened to include corporate team building/development. Henderson moved into professional rugby coaching in 2002.

== Playing career ==
Henderson played for three New Zealand Provincial Rugby unions, captaining two of the teams.

In 1984, he debuted for Manawatu at flanker (No.7) and the following year became the side's outstanding player. Injuries hampered his 1986 season but the following year he was made captain until he was surprisingly dropped from both the leadership and the team late in the season. He played 37 games for Manawatu before transferring with the Army to Christchurch.

He played 16 games for Canterbury (1988/89) at flanker playing alongside Robbie Deans, Andy Earl and Wayne Smith.

A third transfer in 1992 took him to Nelson where he captained 3rd division Nelson Bays. In his first year with the side, Henderson led the team through a record unbeaten season to win the 3rd Division National Provincial Championship (NPC) and promotion to the second division. It also earned him the Supporters' Club Player of the Season award.

Henderson also captained both the New Zealand Army rugby team and the NZ Combined Services team, touring the UK twice with the NZ Combined Services and returning home undefeated.

In 1986, Brian Lachore's panel selected Henderson for an All Black trial but a knee injury robbed him of the opportunity and he underwent surgery a month before the trial.

As a rugby sevens players, Henderson represented Manawatu (1983–87) and Canterbury (1988–89) with Canterbury coming second in the National Finals under Wayne Smith.

== Coaching career ==
Henderson, as Head Coach, was involved in Canterbury age grade rugby in a coaching partnership with backs coach and former Canterbury fly half Greg Coffey. In 1999, in partnership with former All Black Craig Green, Henderson coached the Canterbury Crusaders U21 side to victory in the inaugural Super 12 U21 competition. He reconnected with Greg Coffey in 2000 to draw the competition and to finish second the following year.

Henderson left New Zealand in 2001 to commence his professional coaching career with Sanyo Rugby in Japan and was instrumental in founding a feeder relationship between Sanyo and top rugby University Kanto Gakuin (KGU), as well as facilitating a commercial alliance between Sanyo and the Canterbury Rugby Union. Henderson was with Sanyo as Head Coach for 3 years, moving to KGU and Kurita for a further year before returning to New Zealand at the end of 2005.

In 2006, Henderson was Head Coach for Tasman Makos B team while at the same time operating as Technical Coach and video analyst for the Tasman A team.

However, the northern hemisphere called and he headed to Coventry Rugby Club in January 2007, helping them to avoid relegation, before contracting as Head Coach the following season.

In 2008, Henderson accepted the role of Specialist Forward coach for the Portugal National Rugby Federation. At the completion of that 2-year contract he left Portugal to take up the Head Coach position with the Oxford University Blues in September 2010 and also consults for the RFU to deliver specialist coaching seminars to coaches and teams within the UK. Henderson's last stint overseas was in Japan again, where he coached Honda Rugby Football club for three seasons.

== Notable family members ==
Murray Henderson comes from a competitive sporting family. His uncle Wally Coe was a New Zealand Welterweight boxer who won a gold medal at the 1962 British Empire and Commonwealth Games.

Great uncle Dick Dunn was also a keen sportsman who played 52 consecutive seasons of senior cricket and rose to coach the New Zealand women's cricket team. Boxing was also a passion and Dunn established boxing gyms training children off the street as well as notable champions such as Commonwealth gold medallists Wally Coe and Frank Creagh.

His daughter Cassie Henderson is a pop singer-songwriter.
