= History of the English rugby union system =

England has a comprehensive league structure in place, including national fully professional leagues to amateur regional leagues.

The format and competitiveness of the leagues have changed greatly since their beginnings in 1987. Likewise the leagues started off amateur but professionalism has since been permitted. However, it has always had three or four national leagues with various regional and county leagues below.

== Sunday Telegraph Merit Tables ==
The Sunday Telegraph published Merit Tables for the leading English clubs from the 1960s to the 1980s. The position of the clubs was based on the percentage of matches won with only matches against other clubs in the table counting.

Sunday Telegraph English Champions 1964 to 1987:

- 1963-64 London Scottish
- 1964-65 London Scottish
- 1965-66 Bristol
- 1966-67 London Welsh
- 1967-68 London Welsh
- 1968-69 London Welsh
- 1969-70 Coventry
- 1970-71 London Welsh
- 1971-72 Bristol
- 1972-73 Coventry
- 1973-74 Bristol
- 1974-75 Rosslyn Park
- 1975-76 Northampton
- 1976-77 Moseley
- 1977-78 London Welsh
- 1978-79 London Welsh
- 1979-80 Leicester
- 1980-81 Leicester
- 1981-82 Gloucester
- 1982-83 Coventry
- 1983-84 Wasps
- 1984-85 Bath
- 1985-86 Leicester
- 1986-87 Bath

== Precursor competitions ==
While there were experiments with county leagues in the north in the nineteenth century for most of rugby union's history there have been no organised leagues. The 1970s saw the creation of a national cup and a series of regional and county merit leagues (the most important of which being the North, Midlands, South West and London merit league).

In 1984 this was taken one step further with the creation of two national merit leagues for the top twenty four clubs (based around playing a minimum of sixteen fixtures against each other, a factor which led to Exeter's exclusion after consideration). The top division had three clubs from each of the major merit leagues. In these clubs had to play a minimum of eight fixtures against the other clubs in their division but it was largely based around pre-existing fixtures. There was a system of promotion and relegation between the Merit Tables. 1985 saw the addition of a third national merit table, albeit without promotion and relegation to the top two.

=== 1984–85 season ===
The initial lineups of the merit tables was as follows:

Merit Table A

- Bath
- Bristol
- Coventry
- Gloucester
- Gosforth
- Harlequins
- Leicester
- London Irish
- London Scottish
- Moseley
- Orrell
- Sale

Merit Table B

- Bedford
- Blackheath
- Headingley
- Liverpool
- London Welsh
- Northampton
- Nottingham
- Richmond
- Rosslyn Park
- Saracens
- Wasps
- Waterloo

Merit Table A

- Champions: Sale
- Relegated: Coventry; London Irish; Orrell

Merit Table B

- Promoted: Headingley; Nottingham; Wasps

=== 1985–86 ===
This year saw the creation of Merit Table C with the following clubs:

- Birmingham
- Exeter
- Fylde
- Metropolitan Police
- Morley
- Nuneaton
- Plymouth
- Roundhay
- Sheffield
- Vale of Lune
- Wakefield
- West Hartlepool
- Merit Table A
- Champions:Gloucester
- Relegated: Gosforth; Headingley
- Merit Table B
- Promoted: 1st Orrell; 2nd Coventry;
- Liverpool merge with non-league St Helens to become Liverpool-St Helens
- Merit Table C
- Champions (not promoted):

=== 1986–87 ===
- Merit Table A
- Champions: Bath
- Relegated to National 2: London Scottish
- Merit Table B
- Promoted into National 1: Waterloo
- Merit Table C
- Champions (not promoted):
- Relegated to Area League North: Roundhay
- Admitted to National 3: Maidstone

== Foundation of the national league system ==
In 1987 the merit tables formed the basis of the top three divisions of the national league system. For the first season there were no fixed fixtures so clubs had to arrange their own (to a minimum of ten out of eleven opponents, only one game against each club could count). For the initial season there was no promotion and relegation between National 2 and National 3 but this was created for the following season. National 3 had a minimum of two clubs per region (with the top four clubs in the previous season's Merit Table C getting a guaranteed spot outside this quota) thus Roundhay missed out on a spot to Maidstone.

In 1988 clubs had their fixtures set by the league for them though still only played each other once.

=== Initial composition of major leagues ===
National 1

- Bath
- Bristol
- Coventry
- Gloucester
- Harlequins
- Leicester
- Moseley
- Nottingham
- Orrell
- Sale
- Wasps
- Waterloo

National 2

- Bedford
- Blackheath
- Gosforth
- Headingley
- Liverpool-St Helens
- London Irish
- London Scottish
- London Welsh
- Northampton
- Richmond
- Rosslyn Park
- Saracens

National 3

- Birmingham
- Exeter
- Fylde
- Maidstone
- Metropolitan Police
- Morley
- Nuneaton
- Plymouth
- Sheffield
- Vale of Lune
- Wakefield
- West Hartlepool

Area League North

- Birkenhead Park
- Broughton Park
- Derby
- Durham City
- Lichfield
- Northern
- Preston Grasshoppers
- Roundhay
- Rugby
- Solihull
- Stourbridge

Area League South

- Askeans
- Camborne
- Cheltenham
- Havant
- Lydney
- Salisbury
- Sidcup
- Southend
- Streatham-Croydon
- Stroud
- Sudbury

=== 1987–88 season ===
National 1

- Champions: Leicester
- Relegated: Coventry; Sale

National 2

- Promoted: Liverpool-St Helens; Rosslyn Park

National 3

- Champions (not promoted): Wakefield
- Relegated: Birmingham; Morley (both to Area League North)

Area League North

- Promoted: Rugby
- Relegated: Birkenhead Park; Derby; Solihull
- Promoted into league: Stoke; Winnington Park

Area League South

- Promoted: Askeans
- Relegated: Streatham-Croydon
- Promoted into league: Ealing; Redruth

=== 1988–89 season ===
National 1

- Champions: Bath
- Relegated: Liverpool-St Helens; Waterloo

National 2

- Promoted: Bedford; Saracens
- Relegated: London Scottish; London Welsh

National 3

- Promoted: Rugby; Plymouth
- Relegated: Maidstone; Metropolitan Police (both to Area League South)

Area League North

- Promoted: Roundhay
- Relegated: Birmingham
- Promoted into league: Kendal; Walsall

Area League South

- Promoted: Lydney
- Relegated: Ealing; Sidcup; Stroud
- Promoted into league: Basingstoke; Clifton

=== 1989–90 season ===
National 1

- Champions: Wasps
- Relegated: Bedford

National 2

- Promoted: Liverpool-St Helens; Northampton

National 3

- Promoted: London Scottish; Wakefield
- Relegated to National 4 South: London Welsh

Area League North

- Promoted: Broughton Park; Morley
- Promoted into league: Birmingham-Solihull; Harrogate; Hereford; Otley

Area League South

- Promoted: Clifton; Metropolitan Police
- Relegated: Salisbury
- Promoted into league: Ealing; Maidenhead; North Walsham; Weston-super-Mare

=== 1990–91 season ===
For the 1990–91 season all divisions were increased to 13 teams and the Area Leagues were renamed National 4 North and National 4 South.

National 1

- Champions: Bath
- Relegated: Liverpool-St Helens; Moseley

National 2

- Promoted: London Irish; Rugby
- Relegated: Headingley; Richmond

National 3

- Promoted: Morley; West Hartlepool
- Relegated: Metropolitan Police (to 4 South); Vale of Lune (to 4 North)

National 4 North

- Promoted: Otley
- Relegated: Birmingham-Solihull; Stoke
- Promoted into league: Aspatria; Towcestrians

National 4 South

- Promoted: Redruth
- Relegated: Cheltenham; Maidenhead
- Promoted into league: High Wycombe; Sidcup

=== 1991–92 season ===
National 1

- Champions: Bath
- Relegated: Nottingham; Rosslyn Park

National 2

- Promoted: London Scottish; West Hartlepool
- Relegated: Liverpool-St Helens; Plymouth

National 3

- Promoted: Fylde; Richmond
- Relegated: Lydney (to 4 South); Nuneaton (to 4 North)
- Headingley and Roundhay merged to form Leeds

National 4 North

- Promoted: Aspatria
- Relegated: Northern; Vale of Lune
- Promoted into league: Rotherham; Stoke

National 4 South

- Promoted: Havant
- Relegated: Ealing; Sidcup
- Promoted into league: Berry Hill; Thurrock

=== 1992–93 season ===
National 1

- Champions: Bath
- Relegated: London Scottish; Rugby; Saracens; West Hartlepool

National 2

- Promoted: Newcastle-Gosforth
- Relegated: Bedford; Blackheath; Coventry; Fylde; Morley; Richmond; Rosslyn Park

National 3

- Promoted: Otley
- Relegated to National 4: Askeans; Aspatria; Broughton Park; Clifton; Leeds; Liverpool-St Helens; Plymouth; Sheffield

National 4 North

- Promoted into National 4: Harrogate
- Relegated: Towcestrians
- Promoted into league: Birmingham-Solihull; Bradford & Bingley

National 4 South

- Promoted: Sudbury
- Relegated: Thurrock
- Promoted into league: Reading; Tabard

== Introduction of home and away fixtures ==
=== 1993–94 season ===
The 1993–94 season saw the reduction in size of the national divisions to 10 teams and the creation of a new National 4 division. It also saw the introduction of home and away fixtures. National 4 (North and South) kept its same format but were now renamed to National 5 (North and South).

National 1

- Champions: Bath
- Relegated: London Irish; Newcastle-Gosforth

National 2

- Promoted: Sale; West Hartlepool
- Relegated: Otley; Rugby

National 3

- Promoted: Coventry; Fylde
- Relegated: Havant; Redruth

National 4

- Promoted: Clifton; Harrogate
- Relegated: Sheffield (to 5 North); Sudbury (to 5 South)

National 5 North

- Promoted: Rotherham
- Relegated: Bradford & Bingley; Durham City
- Promoted into league: Barkers Butts; Wharfedale

National 5 South

- Promoted: Reading
- Relegated: Maidstone; Southend
- Promoted into league: Barking; Henley

=== 1994–95 season ===
National 1

- Champions: Leicester
- Relegated: Northampton

National 2

- Promoted: Saracens
- Relegated: Coventry; Fylde

National 3

- Promoted: Bedford; Blackheath
- Relegated: Clifton; Exeter

National 4

- Promoted: Reading; Rotherham
- Relegated: Askeans (to 5 South); Broughton Park (to 5 North)

National 5 North

- Promoted: Walsall
- Relegated: Barkers Butts; Hereford
- Promoted into league: Sandal; Worcester

National 5 South

- Promoted: London Welsh
- Relegated: Basingstoke; Sudbury
- Promoted into league: Camberley; Cheltenham

=== 1995–96 season ===
National 1

- Champions: Bath

National 2

- Promoted: London Irish; Northampton

National 3

- Promoted: Coventry; Richmond, Rotherham; Rugby

National 4

- No promotion as merged into National 3
- Relegated: Aspatria (to 4 North); Plymouth (to 4 South)

National 5 North

- Promoted: Wharfedale
- Relegated: Broughton Park
- Promoted into league: Hereford; Manchester

National 5 South

- Promoted: Lydney
- Relegated: Camborne
- Promoted into league: Charlton Park; Newbury

== Advent of professionalism ==
=== 1996–97 season ===
This year saw the expansion of the top two divisions to 12 teams and the temporary expansion of National 3 to sixteen clubs. It also saw National 5 (North and South) revert to being National 4 (North and South), expanded to 14 teams, and for the first time, with home and away fixtures. The leagues became openly professional this year.

National 1

- Champions: Wasps
- Relegated: Orrell; West Hartlepool

National 2

- Promoted: Newcastle; Richmond
- Relegated: Nottingham; Rugby

National 3

- Promoted: Exeter; Fylde
- Relegated: Clifton; Havant; Redruth (all three to 2 South); Walsall (to 2 North)

National 4 North

- Promoted: Worcester
- Relegated: Hereford; Stoke
- Promoted into league: Hinckley; Sedgley Park

National 4 South

- Promoted: Newbury
- Relegated: Askeans; Berry Hill; Charlton Park; High Wycombe
- Promoted into league: Bridgwater; Esher

== Two premierships era ==
=== 1997–98 season ===
The 1997–98 season saw the addition of sponsorship by Allied Dunbar and as a result a rebranding of National 1 and 2 to Premiership 1 and 2, whereas National 3 became the new National 1, while National 4 (North and South) became National 2 (North and South) accordingly.

Premiership 1

- Champions: Newcastle Falcons
- Relegated: Bristol

Premiership 2

- Promoted: Bedford; London Scottish; West Hartlepool

National 1

- Promoted: Leeds; London Welsh; Rugby; Worcester

National 2 North

- Promoted: Birmingham-Solihull; Manchester
- Promoted into league: New Brighton; Whitchurch

National 2 South

- Promoted: Camberley; Henley
- Promoted into league: Bracknell; Norwich

=== 1998–99 season ===
The 1998–99 season saw the expansion of the two premiership divisions to fourteen teams.

Premiership 1

- Champions: Leicester
- Relegated: West Hartlepool
- London Scottish and Richmond disband

Premiership 2

- Promoted: Bristol
- Relegated: Blackheath; Fylde

National 1

- Promoted: Henley; Manchester
- Relegated: Liverpool-St Helens; Morley (both to 2 North)

National 2 North

- Promoted: Preston Grasshoppers
- Relegated: Hinckley; Lichfield; Winnington Park
- Promoted into league: Bedford Athletic; Doncaster

National 2 South

- Promoted: Bracknell
- Relegated: Havant
- Promoted into league: Penzance & Newlyn; Westcombe Park

=== 1999–2000 season ===
The 1999–2000 season saw the contraction of Premiership 1 to twelve teams with London Scottish and Richmond being absorbed into London Irish and reforming in county leagues.

Premiership 1

- Champions: Leicester
- Relegated: Bedford

Premiership 2

- Promoted: Rotherham
- Relegated: Rugby; West Hartlepool

National 1

- Promoted: Birmingham-Solihull; Otley
- Relegated: Blackheath; Reading (both to 3 South)

National 2 North

- Promoted: Kendal
- Relegated: Sheffield
- Promoted into league: Dudley Kingswinford; Tynedale

National 2 South

- Promoted: Esher
- Relegated: Bridgwater & Albion; Metropolitan Police; Norwich
- Promoted into league: Basingstoke; Launceston

== One Premiership era ==
=== 2000–01 season ===
The 2000–01 season saw Zurich take over the sponsorship of the top division with no interest in the second tier. This saw Premiership 2 rebranded National 1, with National 1 and 2 (North and South) becoming National 2 and 3 (North and South) respectively. It also saw the creation of a promotion play-off between the runners-up of the National 3 divisions with an extra relegation place from National 2. A new Championship competition for the top eight clubs was introduced this season. It was intended that the winners of the Championship would become champions but this decision was revoked after outcry. This season also saw the introduction of the rugby union bonus points system.

Premiership

- Champions: Leicester
- Relegated: Rotherham

National 1

- Promoted: Leeds
- Relegated: Orrell; Waterloo

National 2

- Promoted: Bracknell; Rugby
- Relegated: Camberley; Lydney (both to 3 South); West Hartlepool (to 3 North)

National 3 North

- Promoted: Sedgley Park; Stourbridge
- Relegated: Aspatria; Walsall
- Promoted into league: Blaydon; Darlington Mowden Park; Scunthorpe

National 3 South

- Promoted: Plymouth
- Relegated: Basingstoke; Cheltenham; Reading; Weston-super-Mare
- Promoted into league: Cinderford; Old Colfeians; Old Patesians

=== 2001–02 season ===
Premiership

- Champions: Leicester

National 1

- Champions (not promoted): Rotherham
- Relegated: Bracknell; Henley

National 2

- Promoted: Orrell; Plymouth
- Relegated: Preston Grasshoppers; Waterloo (both to 3 North); Rosslyn Park (to 3 South)

National 3 North

- Promoted: Doncaster
- Relegated: Morley; Sandal; West Hartlepool; Whitchurch
- Promoted into league: Broadstreet; Halifax; Hull Ionians

National 3 South

- Promoted: Launceston; Penzance & Newlyn
- Relegated: Cinderford; Clifton
- Promoted into league: Basingstoke; Havant; Weston-super-Mare

=== 2002–03 season ===
This season saw the replacement of the Zurich Championship with a top four play-off, the winner of which would be crowned champions.

Premiership

- Champions: Wasps
- Relegated: Bristol

National 1

- Promoted: Rotherham
- Relegated: Moseley; Rugby

National 2

- Promoted: Henley; Penzance & Newlyn
- Relegated: Fylde; Kendal (both to 3 North); Launceston (to 3 South)

National 3 North

- Promoted: Nuneaton
- Relegated: Bedford Athletic; Broadstreet; Hull Ionians; Scunthorpe
- Promoted into league: Darlington; Longton; Macclesfield

National 3 South

- Promoted: Lydney; Rosslyn Park
- Relegated: Camberley; Havant
- Promoted into league: Dings Crusaders; Haywards Heath; Southend

=== 2003–04 season ===
Premiership

- Champions: Wasps
- Relegated: Rotherham

National 1

- Promoted: Worcester
- Relegated: Manchester
- Wakefield disband

National 2

- Promoted: Nottingham; Sedgley Park
- Relegated: Lydney (to 3 South); Rugby (to 3 North)

National 3 North

- Promoted: Waterloo
- Relegated: Liverpool-St Helens; Longton; Preston Grasshoppers
- Promoted into league: Bedford Athletic; Bradford & Bingley; Cleckheaton

National 3 South

- Promoted: Blackheath; Launceston
- Relegated: Basingstoke; Old Colfeians
- Promoted into league: Havant; Hertford; Reading

=== 2004–05 season ===
Premiership

- Champions: Wasps
- Relegated: Harlequins

National 1

- Promoted: Bristol
- Relegated: Henley; Orrell

National 2

- Promoted: Doncaster; Newbury
- Relegated: Bracknell; Rosslyn Park (both to 3 South); Nuneaton (to 3 North)

National 3 North

- Promoted: Halifax
- Relegated: Bedford Athletic; Dudley Kingswinford; Rugby
- Promoted into league: Hull Ionians; Leicester Lions; Preston Grasshoppers

National 3 South

- Promoted: Barking; Redruth
- Relegated: Haywards Heath; Tabard; Weston-super-Mare
- Promoted into league: Bridgwater & Albion; Cambridge; Cinderford

=== 2005–06 season ===
The 2005–06 season saw Zurich replaced as Premiership sponsors by Guinness

Premiership

- Champions: Sale
- Relegated: Leeds

National 1

- Promoted: Harlequins

National 2

- Promoted: Moseley; Waterloo
- Relegated: Orrell (to 3 North)

National 3 North

- Promoted: Bradford & Bingley; Nuneaton
- Relegated: Kendal; New Brighton
- Promoted into league: Morley; Rugby; West Park St Helens

National 3 South

- Promoted: Cambridge
- Relegated: Bracknell; Reading
- Promoted into league: Canterbury; Chinnor; Clifton

=== 2006–07 season ===
The 2006–07 season saw National 1 expanded to sixteen clubs.

Premiership

- Champions: Leicester
- Relegated: Northampton

National 1

- Promoted: Leeds
- Relegated: Otley; Waterloo

National 2

- Promoted: Esher; Launceston
- Relegated: Barking (to 3 South); Bradford & Bingley; Harrogate (both to 3 North)

National 3 North

- Promoted: Blaydon
- Relegated: Darlington; Cleckheaton; Orrell
- Promoted into league: Beverley; Caldy

National 3 South

- Promoted: Southend; Westcombe Park
- Relegated: Chinnor; Hertford; Old Patesians
- Promoted into league: Ealing; London Scottish; Luton; Mounts Bay

=== 2007–08 season ===
Premiership

- Champions: Wasps
- Relegated: Leeds

National 1

- Promoted: Northampton
- Relegated: Birmingham-Solihull; Launceston

National 2

- Promoted: Manchester; Otley
- Relegated: Halifax; Nuneaton (both to 3 North); Henley (to 3 South)

National 3 North

- Promoted: Tynedale
- Relegated: Beverley; Morley; West Park St Helens
- Transferred to 3 South: Rugby
- Promoted into league: Huddersfield; Kendal; Loughborough Students

National 3 South

- Promoted: Cinderford; Mounts Bay
- Relegated: Clifton; Luton; North Walsham
- Promoted into league: Chinnor; Richmond; Worthing

=== 2008–09 season ===
Premiership

- Champions: Leicester
- Relegated: Bristol

National 1

- Promoted: Leeds
- Relegated: Esher; Manchester; Newbury; Otley; Sedgley Park

National 2

- Promoted: Birmingham-Solihull
- Relegated: Southend; Westcombe Park (both to 2 South); Waterloo (to 2 North)
- Mounts Bay disband

National 3 North

- Promoted: Nuneaton
- Relegated: Darlington Mowden Park
- Halifax disband
- Promoted into league: Broadstreet; Hull; Westoe

National 3 South

- Promoted: London Scottish
- Relegated: Chinnor; Havant
- Transferred to 2 North: Rugby
- Promoted into league: Barnes; Clifton; Shelford

=== Additional National 3 divisions ===
The 2009–10 season saw the creation of several National 3 divisions. The North and South divisions were replaced with North, Midlands, South West and London divisions.

National 3 North

- Beverley
- Birkenhead Park
- Chester
- Cleckheaton
- Darlington Mowden Park
- Middlesbrough
- Morley
- Penrith
- Rochdale
- Rossendale
- Sheffield Tigers
- Stockport
- West Hartlepool
- West Park St Helens

National 3 Midlands

- Ampthill
- Bedford Athletic
- Bromsgrove
- Hereford
- Hinckley
- Kenilworth
- Kettering
- Longton
- Luctonians
- Luton
- Malvern
- Newport (Salop)
- Peterborough
- South Leicester

National 3 South West

- Barnstable
- Bournemouth
- Chinnor
- Chippenham
- Cleve
- Coney Hill
- Exmouth
- Maidenhead
- Old Patesians
- Oxford Harlequins
- Reading
- Redingensians
- Taunton
- Weston-super-Mare

National 3 London

- Basingstoke
- Bishop's Stortford
- Bracknell
- Diss
- Dorking
- Havant
- Haywards Heath
- Hertford
- Jersey
- North Walsham
- Old Albanians
- Portsmouth
- Sutton & Epsom
- Tring

=== 2009–10 season ===
The 2009–10 season saw major changes to the league system below the Premiership. The second tier was reduced to twelve teams and rebranded the RFU Championship with a play-off system and only one relegation spot. National 2 and 3 (North and South) reverted to National 1 and National 2 (North and South), and were expanded to sixteen teams. Four National 3 divisions were created based around the top regional leagues with fourteen teams in each (see above). National play-offs for the title were created for the winners of the National 2 and National 3 divisions. A similar play-off series was created for the eight winners of the regional divisions.

Premiership

- Champions: Leicester
- Relegated: Worcester

Championship

- Promoted: Exeter
- Relegated: Coventry

National 1

- Promoted: Esher
- Relegated: Manchester; Nuneaton (both to National 2 North); Newbury (to National 2 South)

National 2 North

- Promoted: Macclesfield
- Relegated: Broadstreet (to 3 Midlands); Bradford & Bingley; Waterloo (both to 3 North)

National 2 South

- Promoted: Barking; Rosslyn Park
- Relegated: Barnes (to 3 London); Bridgwater & Albion (to 3 South West)

National 3 North

- Promoted: Morley
- Relegated: Cleckheaton; West Hartlepool; West Park St Helens
- Transferred to 3 Midlands: Sheffield Tigers
- Promoted in: Billingham; Lymm; Sandal

National 3 Midlands

- Promoted: Hinckley (to 2 South); Luctonians (to 2 North)
- Relegated: Bedford Athletic; Kettering
- Transferred to 3 London: Ampthill
- Promoted in: Burton; Old Northamptonians; Scunthorpe

National 3 South West

- Promoted: Taunton
- Relegated: Chippenham; Maidenhead; Reading
- Promoted in: Cheltenham; Hartpury College; Newton Abbot

National 3 London

- Promoted: Jersey; Old Albanians
- Relegated: Haywards Heath; Portsmouth; Sutton & Epsom
- Promoted in: Civil Service; Gravesend; Staines

=== 2010–11 season ===
Premiership

- Champions: Saracens
- Relegated: Leeds
- Championship
- Promoted: Worcester
- Relegated: Birmingham-Solihull

National 1

- Promoted: London Scottish
- Relegated: Otley (to National 2 North); Launceston; Redruth (both to National 2 South)

National 2 North

- Promoted: Fylde
- Relegated: Manchester; Rugby Lions (both to 3 Midlands); Morley (to 3 North)

National 2 South

- Promoted: Ealing Trailfinders; Jersey
- Relegated: Canterbury (to 3 London); Hinckley (to 3 Midlands); Newbury (to 3 South West)

National 3 North

- Promoted: Stockport
- Relegated: Billingham; Middlesbrough; Rochdale
- Promoted in: Altrincham Kersal; Burnage; West Hartlepool

National 3 Midlands

- Promoted: Bromsgrove; Sheffield Tigers
- Relegated: Burton; Kenilworth; Peterborough
- Transferred to 3 London: Luton
- Promoted in: Dudley Kingswinford; Mansfield; Syston

National 3 South West

- Promoted: Hartpury College
- Relegated: Cheltenham; Cleve; Coney Hill
- Promoted in: Amersham & Chiltern; Chippenham; Old Redcliffians

National 3 London

- Promoted: Barnes; Hertford
- Relegated: Basingstoke; Diss; North Walsham
- Promoted in: London Irish Amateurs; Tonbridge Juddian; Westcliff

=== 2011–12 season ===
Premiership

- Champions: Harlequins
- Relegated: Newcastle Falcons

Championship

- Promoted: London Welsh
- Relegated: Esher

National 1

- Promoted: Jersey
- Relegated: Birmingham & Solihull; Stourbridge (both to National 2 North); Barking (to National 2 South)

National 2 North

- Promoted: Loughborough Students
- Relegated: Harrogate; Kendal (both to 3 North); Nuneaton (to 3 Midlands)

National 2 South

- Promoted: Old Albanians; Richmond
- Relegated: Barnes; Hertford; Westcombe Park (to 3 London)

National 3 North

- Promoted: Darlington Mowden Park
- Relegated: Beverley; Altrincham Kersal; Morley
- Promoted in: Billingham; Percy Park

National 3 Midlands

- Promoted: Dudley Kingswinford (to 2 North); Rugby Lions were due to be promoted to 2 South but were expelled before the season started
- Relegated: Hereford; Old Northamptonians; Manchester
- Transferred to 3 South West: Malvern
- Promoted in: Sutton Coldfield; Bournville; Derby; Sandbach

National 3 South West

- Promoted: Bournemouth; Chinnor
- Relegated: Old Redcliffians; Newbury Blues; Bridgwater & Albion
- Promoted in: Maidenhead; Brixham; Avonmouth Old Boys

National 3 London

- Promoted: Canterbury
- Relegated: Bracknell; Luton; Havant
- Transferred to 3 Midlands: Ampthill
- Transferred to 3 South West: London Irish Amateurs
- Promoted in: Thurrock; Guernsey; Old Elthamians

=== 2012–13 season ===
Premiership

- Champions: Leicester Tigers
- Relegated: London Welsh

Championship

- Promoted: Newcastle Falcons
- Relegated: Doncaster Knights

National 1

- Promoted: Ealing Trailfinders
- Relegated: Macclesfield; Sedgley Park (both to National 2 North); Cambridge (to National 2 South)

National 2 North

- Promoted: Hull Ionians
- Relegated: Huddersfield; Stockport; Westoe (all to 2 North)

National 2 South

- Promoted: Henley Hawks; Worthing
- Relegated: Barking (to 3 London); Lydney (to 3 South West)

National 3 North

- Promoted: Chester; Harrogate
- Relegated: Birkenhead Park; Kendal; West Hartlepool
- Transferred to 3 Midlands: Lymm
- Promoted in: Beverley; Morley; Sale

National 3 Midlands

- Promoted: Ampthill (to 2 South)
- Relegated: Derby; Mansfield
- Promoted in: Bedford Athletic; Old Halesonians

National 3 South West

- Promoted: Exmouth; London Irish Amateur
- Relegated: Maidenhead; Malvern; Oxford Harlequins
- Promoted in: Bracknell; Old Centralians; Old Redcliffians; Worcester Wanderers

National 3 London

- Promoted: Bishop's Stortford
- Relegated: Gravesend; Staines; Westcliff
- Promoted in: Basingstoke; Bury St Edmunds; East Grinstead

=== 2013–14 season ===
Premiership

- Champions: Northampton Saints
- Relegated: Worcester Warriors

Championship

- Promoted: London Welsh
- Relegated: Ealing Trailfinders

National 1

- Promoted: Doncaster Knights
- Relegated: Henley Hawks; Worthing Raiders (both to National 2 South); Hull Ionians (to National 2 North)

National 2 North

- Promoted: Darlington Mowden Park; Macclesfield
- Relegated: Bromsgrove; Dudley Kingswinford (both to 3 Midlands); Sheffield Tigers (to 3 North)

National 2 South

- Promoted: Hartpury College
- Relegated: Bournemouth; Exmouth (both to 3 South West); London Irish Amateur (to 3 London)
- Transferred to 2 North: Ampthill

National 3 North

- Promoted: Huddersfield; Stockport
- Relegated: Bradford & Bingley; Penrith; Percy Park
- Promoted in: Cleckheaton; Huddersfield YMCA; Wirral

National 3 Midlands

- Promoted: Broadstreet
- Relegated: Bedford Athletic; Newport; Syston
- Transferred to 3 North: Lymm
- Promoted in: Burton; Lichfield; Peterborough Lions

National 3 South West

- Promoted: Lydney
- Relegated: Avonmouth Old Boys; Chippenham; Worcester Wanderers
- Promoted in: Chard; Hornets; Oxford Harlequins
- Transferred to 3 London: Amersham & Chiltern

National 3 London

- Promoted: Dorking; Old Elthamians
- Relegated: Barking; Basingstoke; Thurrock
- Promoted in: Chichester; Gravesend; Westcliff

=== 2014–15 season ===
Premiership

- Champions: Saracens
- Relegated: London Welsh

Championship

- Promoted: Worcester Warriors
- Relegated: Plymouth Albion

National 1

- Promoted: Ealing Trailfinders
- Relegated: Macclesfield; Tynedale (both to National 2 North); Old Albanians (to National 2 South)

National 2 North

- Promoted: Ampthill; Hull Ionians
- Relegated: Birmingham & Solihull (to 3 Midlands); Hull; Stockport (to 3 North)

National 2 South

- Promoted: Henley Hawks
- Relegated: Dings Crusaders; Lydney (both to 3 South West); Shelford (to 3 London)

National 3 North

- Promoted: Sale Amateurs; Sandal
- Relegated: Beverley; Morley; Westoe
- Promoted in: Birkenhead Park; Ilkley; Sheffield

National 3 Midlands

- Promoted: South Leicester
- Relegated: Bournville; Burton; Dudley Kingswinford
- Promoted in: Newport (Salop); Old Northamptonians; Syston

National 3 South West

- Promoted: Redingensians
- Relegated: Chard; Oxford Harlequins; Weston-super-Mare
- Promoted in: Cleve; Chippenham; Ivybridge
- Transferred to 3 London: Bracknell

National 3 London

- Promoted: Barnes; Bury St Edmunds
- Relegated: Amersham & Chiltern; CS Rugby 1863; Tring
- Promoted in: Colchester; Eton Manor; Wimbledon

== See also ==
- English rugby union system
- Premiership Rugby
- RFU Championship
- National League 1

== Other sources ==
- The Times newspaper 1984 onwards. News articles and results section.
