= Dave Rollitt =

England international rugby union player

- Born: David Malcolm Rollitt; 24 March 1943 Wombwell, Barnsley, England
- Died: December 2022 (aged 79)
- Occupation: School teacher

Rugby union career
- Position: No 8
Amateur team(s)
Years	Team	Apps	(Points)
- Loughborough Colleges
–	Wakefield		
–	Bristol		
International career
Years	Team	Apps	(Points)
1967–1975	England	11	(3)

David Malcolm Rollitt was an England rugby union international and teacher, who won eleven caps between 1967 and 1975. He played in the position of No 8.

He was educated at Barnsley Grammar school and attended Bristol University, where he studied physics. He then trained as a teacher at The Loughborough Colleges.

He played club rugby for Wakefield RFC and Bristol. During his international career, he played eleven times for England making his debut in February 1967 against Ireland. His last appearance came in May 1975 whilst England were touring, against Australia. He scored one try for England.

He played 16 times in his career for the Barbarians. Whilst at The Loughborough Colleges, he was picked for the Barbarians against Bradford in October 1965 scoring two tries.

He later taught mathematics at St Paul's School, London, where he also coached rugby part-time.

He died in December 2022.
