= Peter Preece =

England international rugby union player

- Born: Peter Stuart Preece; 15 November 1949 (age 77) Meriden

Rugby union career
- Position: Centre
Senior career
| Years | Team | Apps | (Points) |
- Coventry R.F.C.
International career
| Years | Team | Apps | (Points) |
| 1972-1976 | England | 12 | (Pts:0; Tries:0; Conv:0; Pens:0; Drop:0) |

Peter Preece is a former rugby union international who represented England from 1972 to 1976. Educated at King Henry viii School, Coventry

== Early life ==
Peter Preece was born on 15 November 1949 in Meriden. His father, Ivor Preece, was also a rugby union international who captained England and represented the British Lions in the 1950s.

== Rugby union career ==
Preece made his international debut on 3 June 1972 at Ellis Park in the South Africa vs England match. Of the 12 matches he played for his national side he was on the winning side on 4 occasions. He played his final match for England on 17 January 1976 at Twickenham in the England vs Wales match.
