= Dave Watt =

England international rugby union player

- Full name: David Edward James Watt
- Born: 5 July 1938 (age 88) Bristol, England
- School: Bristol Cathedral School

Rugby union career
- Position: Lock
International career
Years	Team	Apps	(Points)
1967	England	4	(0)

David Edward James Watt (born 5 July 1938) is an English former international rugby union player.

Watt was born in Bristol and educated at Bristol Cathedral School.

A 17-stone lock, Watt featured for England in all four matches of their 1967 Five Nations campaign and was part of the 1972 tour of South Africa. He captained both Gloucestershire and Western Counties. At club level, Watt was a stalwart of the Bristol Rugby Club, for which he became the first player to make 500 appearances.

== See also ==
- List of England national rugby union players
