= John Barton (rugby union) =

English rugby union player (1943-2021)

- Born: 19 March 1943 Meriden, England
- Died: 12 January 2021 (aged 77)

Rugby union career
- Position: Lock
International career
Years	Team	Apps	(Points)
1967–72	England	4	(6)

John Barton (19 March 1943 - 12 January 2021) was an English rugby union international.

Born in Meriden, Warwickshire, Barton was a lock and occasional number eight, who gained four England caps from 1967 to 1972, scoring two tries. Both of his Test tries came in a 1967 Five Nations match against Wales at Cardiff. He was on the England squad for the 1972 tour of South Africa, but didn't feature in the Test match.

Barton's entire career was spent with Coventry, where he made 265 senior appearances.

== See also ==
- List of England national rugby union players
