= Harold Wheatley =

England international rugby union player

- Full name: Harold Frederick Wheatley
- Born: 26 December 1912 Coventry, England
- Died: 10 April 2003 (aged 90) Coventry, England
- Notable relative: Arthur Wheatley (brother)

Rugby union career
- Position: Prop / Lock
International career
Years	Team	Apps	(Points)
1936–39	England	7	(0)

Harold Frederick Wheatley (26 December 1912 – 10 April 2003) was an English international rugby union player.

Born in Coventry, Wheatley was the younger brother of England lock Arthur and attended South Street School.

Wheatley, a versatile forward, came through the Hillfields juniors and made his debut for Coventry in 1932–33, earning Warwickshire representative honours his first season. From 1936 to 1939, Wheatley gained seven England caps, which includes matches with brother Arthur. He served as Coventry's first post-war captain.

== See also ==
- List of England national rugby union players
