= Barry Ninnes =

England international rugby union player

- Full name: Barry Francis Ninnes
- Born: 23 March 1948 (age 78) St Ives, Cornwall, England
- Height: 6 ft 5 in (196 cm)

Rugby union career
- Position: Lock
International career
Years	Team	Apps	(Points)
1971	England	1	(0)

Barry Francis Ninnes (born 23 March 1948) is an English former rugby union international.

Ninnes, known as "Basil", was born and raised in St Ives, Cornwall.

A lock, Ninnes gained his only England cap against Wales at Cardiff in the 1971 Five Nations. He was a stalwart of Coventry R.F.C., playing over 300 games for the club, while making 35 county appearances with Warwickshire. A back injury brought an end to his career in 1980 and he returned to his original club St Ives RFC as a coach.

== See also ==
- List of England national rugby union players
