= David Duckham =

English rugby union player (1946–2023)

David Duckham MBE
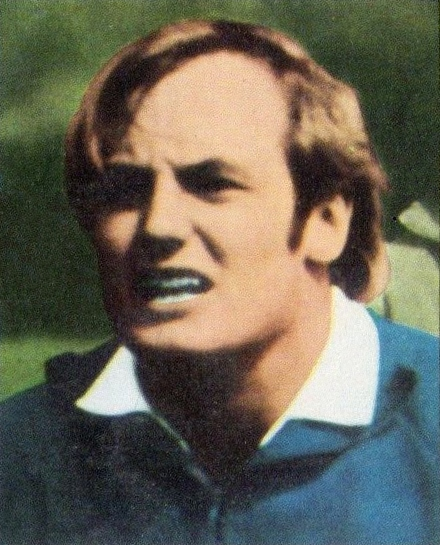
- Born: David John Duckham MBE; 28 June 1946 Coventry, Warwickshire, England
- Died: 9 January 2023 (aged 76) London, England
- Height: 6 ft 1 in (1.85 m)
- Weight: 14 st 9 lb (93 kg)

Rugby union career
- Position(s): Wing; Centre
Senior career
Years	Team	Apps	(Points)
1967–1979	Coventry	188	(88)
International career
Years	Team	Apps	(Points)
1969–1976	England	36	(36)
1971	British and Irish Lions	3	(0)
1973	Barbarians		

David John Duckham MBE (28 June 1946 – 9 January 2023) was an English rugby union player. He played 36 games for England (scoring 10 tries), in three tests on the 1971 British Lions tour to New Zealand and for Barbarians F.C. in their 1973 defeat of New Zealand.

== Early life and education ==
Born in Coventry, Warwickshire on 28 June 1946, Duckham was educated at Coundon Infant and Junior School and King Henry VIII Grammar School,

== Rugby career ==
=== Early success ===
Duckham played his entire club career for his hometown club, Coventry R.F.C. playing at both centre and wing from 1967 to 1979. He made his international debut for England against Ireland in 1969, and quickly established himself as one of England's best centres. Duckham's early career saw him form a notable centre partnership with John Spencer. His game was marked by pace, swerves, sidesteps and an ability to wrong-foot his opponents, although this came at a time when the English team were struggling, especially against rivals Wales.

=== "Dai Duckham" ===
Duckham is perhaps best remembered for his performances for the British and Irish Lions and Barbarians teams under the Welsh coach Carwyn James. James had admired Duckham's abilities (despite playing in an era when England struggled for consistency and results) and selected him as a winger for the 1971 British Lions tour to New Zealand. Under James' tutelage, Duckham was given an attacking freedom that he had not experienced with England and this brought the best out of his remarkable talent. Duckham would score 11 tries in his 16 games on the tour, featuring in three tests. Duckham's six tries in the match against West Coast-Buller set a record for a visiting player in a single match in New Zealand.

In 1973, Duckham was reunited with James and many of his teammates from the 1971 Lions tour, when he was named as the only English back in the Barbarians side to play the All Blacks at Cardiff Arms Park. In the match, Duckham's counter-attacks broke the All Black's defence, even wrong-footing a cameraman with one outrageous dummy. The match is remembered as a classic, with the Barbarians winning 23–11. Duckham's transformation under James, together with his status as the lone Englishman in a backline dominated by Welsh players, would see him became a favourite among both Welsh players and supporters, with many regarding him as one of their own. This earned him the life long nickname Dai (an affectionate Welsh hypocorism of David). Duckham would even name his autobiography, Dai for England.

=== Later career ===
Duckham took his attacking form into the 1973 Five Nations Championship, scoring a brace of tries for England in the 14-6 win over France. Against Scotland, Duckham made a memorable solo run which England failed to finish, often remembered as "the greatest try never scored at Twickenham stadium". Despite England's poor results in the 1974 Five Nations Championship, Duckham continued to score some memorable tries for club and country, scoring the opening try in a rare win over Wales and touching down for Coventry RFC in the RFU Knockout Cup final against London Scottish RFC. Injury would prevent Duckham from taking part in the 1974 British Lions tour to South Africa, but he would continue to feature for England making his final appearance in 1976 against Scotland at Murrayfield.

== Later years ==
Duckham was appointed Member of the Order of the British Empire (MBE) in the 1977 New Year Honours for services to rugby football. After retirement, Duckham worked for building societies and banks, and was director of marketing for Bloxham School. Duckham was also Honorary President of the rugby charity Wooden Spoon improving the lives of disadvantaged children and young people in Britain and Ireland.

Duckham died from a heart condition on 9 January 2023, at the age of 76.
