= Keith Fairbrother =

England international rugby union & league player (born 1944)

- Born: Keith Eli Fairbrother; 8 May 1944 (age 82) Coventry, England

Rugby union career
- Position: Prop
Amateur team(s)
Years	Team	Apps	(Points)
–	Nuneaton R.F.C.		
–	Coventry R.F.C.		
International career
Years	Team	Apps	(Points)
1969–71	England	12	(0)
- Rugby league career

Playing information
Club
Years	Team	Pld	T	G	FG	P
1974	Leigh	8				0

Keith Eli Fairbrother (born 8 May 1944) is an English rugby union player of Coventry R.F.C.

He also played for England national team as a prop. He was bought out as Chairman of Coventry R.F.C. in August 2006 by Andrew Green, though he retained the lease to part of the Butts Park Arena site. He had been chairman for eight years. He took over the club after it had gone into receivership in 1998.

In 1974, he switched codes to play for Leigh.
