= Coundon Road Stadium =

Former rugby stadium in Coventry, England

Coordinates: 52.4142°N 1.5243°W

- Interactive map of Coundon Road Stadium
- Location: Coventry, England
- Owner: Coventry R.F.C.
- Capacity: 10,000 (1,100 seats)

Construction
- Opened: 1921
- Closed: 2004
- Demolished: 2004

Tenants
- Coventry R.F.C. (1921-2004); Coventry Bears (1998-2004)

Coundon Road Stadium in Coventry was the home ground for Coventry R.F.C. from 1921 to 2004. The stadium has now been demolished.

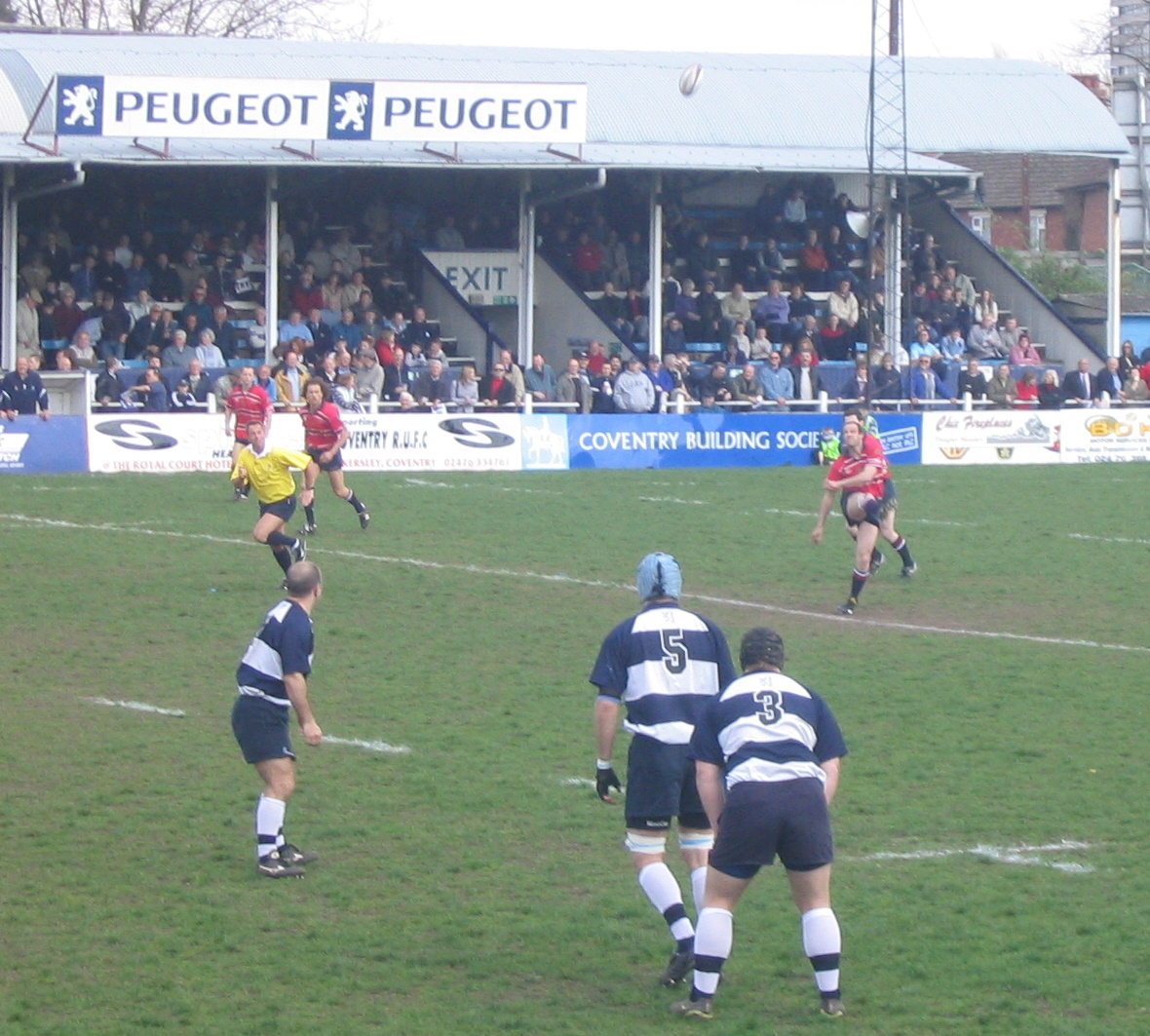
Manchester, in red, kick off for the last match at the ground. The Main Stand is in the background.

The first game at the ground was against United Services Portsmouth, with Coventry R.F.C. losing 13–3. The biggest crowd at the ground was reputedly 18,000 for an England versus Wales Schools' International on 12 March 1939. In the modern era, just over 8,000 people attended the National League One match between Coventry R.F.C. and Newcastle on 2 November 1996, which was a record for the league until 2004.

The stadium had two stands; the Main (Road) Stand and the terraced Cowshed, though additional temporary structures were put in place for some representative games at the ground. The two stands only had minor alterations in their 83 years of existence. However, a clubhouse was opened in 1959, next to the Main Stand.

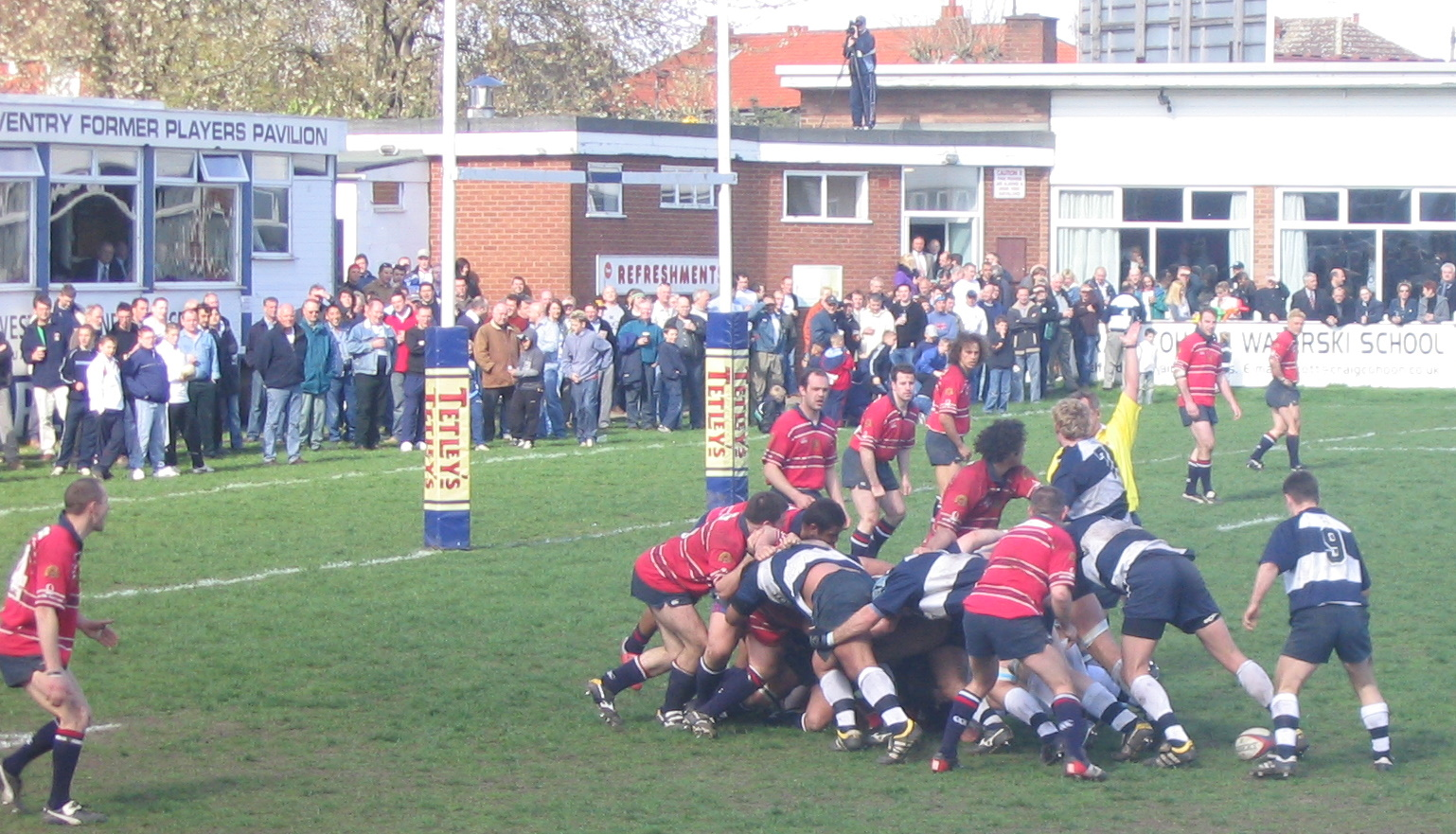
Coventry applying pressure in front of the posts during the final game. The white faced building in the background is the clubhouse, with a cameraman on the roof recording the proceedings.

Their final game at the ground was a 34–20 victory for Coventry R.F.C. against Manchester R.F.C. on 17 April 2004, with an attendance of 3,100. Coventry R.F.C moved to the Butts Park Arena in September of that year, with the old stadium being demolished during November. The site has now been developed as a housing estate by Bryant Homes. Apartment houses on the site are named after former Coventry R.F.C. players including David Duckham, Bert Godwin and Peter Jackson.
