= Geoff Evans (rugby union, born 1950) =

British Lions & England international rugby union player

Geoffrey William Evans (born 10 December 1950 (age 74)) is a former England international rugby union footballer. He toured South Africa in 1974 with the British and Irish Lions and at the time played club rugby for Coventry R.F.C.
