= Peter Rossborough =

England international rugby union player (born 1948)

- Born: Peter Alec Rossborough; 30 June 1948 (age 78) Coventry, England

Rugby union career
- Position: Fullback
Senior career
| Years | Team | Apps | (Points) |
- Coventry R.F.C.
International career
| Years | Team | Apps | (Points) |
| 1971–1975 | England | 7 | (Pts:34; Tries:1; Conv:3; Pens:7; Drop:1) |

Peter Rossborough (born 30 June 1948) is a former rugby union international who represented England from 1971 to 1975. He played club rugby for Coventry R.F.C. during the 1970s.

== Personal life ==
A native of Coventry, Rossborough attended King Henry VIII School and played rugby for his school. He studied at Durham University, where he played for the university rugby team, graduating in 1971. Rossborough was for many years a teacher by profession, teaching English and French at Woodlands Comprehensive School, and reached the position of headmaster at Ashlawn School.

== Rugby union career ==
Rossborough made his international debut aged 22 on 16 January 1971 at Cardiff Arms Park in the Wales vs England match. Of the 7 matches he played for his national side he was on the winning side on 2 occasions. He played his final match for England on 1 February 1975 at Twickenham in the England vs France match.

As a Rugby sevens player, Peter had much success. He was a member of the England team that won the 1973 International Seven-A-Side Tournament, the first sevens tournament with national representative sides, and he went on to manage the England squad that won the inaugural World Cup Sevens held in 1993.

Rossborough was also a member of the Coventry R.F.C. team which won the John Player Cup in both 1973 and 1974.
