= Arthur Wheatley (rugby union) =

England international rugby union player

- Born: 6 December 1908 Coventry, England
- Died: 4 February 1993 (aged 84) Weston, England
- School: Harold Wheatley (brother)

Rugby union career
- Position: Lock
International career
Years	Team	Apps	(Points)
1937–38	England	5	(0)

Arthur Wheatley (6 December 1908 – 4 February 1993) was an English international rugby union player.

Wheatley was born and raised in Coventry, attending South Street School.

A lock, Wheatley made his debut for Coventry in 1929 and first represented Warwickshire during the 1930–31 County Championship. He had to wait until the age of 28 to gain an England trial and broke into the England side for their triple crown-winning 1937 Home Nations campaign, featuring in all three fixtures. The match against Scotland was historic as Wheatley was joined in the team by his brother Harold.

== See also ==
- List of England national rugby union players
