= History of North Georgia College and State University =

North Georgia College & State University was an institution of higher education that began as a branch of the Georgia College of Agriculture and Mechanical at the University of Georgia in 1873. It was merged in 2013 with Gainesville State College to create the University of North Georgia.

== North Georgia Agricultural College 1871–1929 ==
=== Early history (1871–1900) ===
North Georgia Agricultural College officially opened classes in January 1873. Its inception was the result of Morrill Act and the efforts of William Pierce Price. Funds from the Morrill Act were given to the University of Georgia which established the Georgia College of Agriculture and Mechanical Arts in 1872. Price, a politician and native of Dahlonega, persuaded the regents to establish a branch of the college. The school's main building was the old federal mint located near the square in Dahlonega. The mint was in operation from 1838-1861 when it was closed due to the civil war.

When the college officially opened it had 177 students, 98 men and 79 women making it the first co-educational institute in the state. David W. Lewis, a planter, lawyer, and agricultural reformer was the first president. By 1876 the Superior Court of Lumpkin County had granted the college the ability to award degrees and in 1879 the first degrees were awarded. 3 young men and 1 young woman received degrees making it the first institution in the state to award degrees to women. The young woman, Willie Lewis, was the daughter of president Lewis. Reluctant to award a bachelor's degree to a woman Chancellor Patrick Mell justified his decision by saying that older married men had received degrees and they were not technically bachelors.

Although the college was founded as an agricultural college an agriculture department was not established until 1902. Instead the focus was on a liberal arts education. The core curriculum consisted of Latin, Greek, mathematics, natural science, English, and philosophy. In 1875, the school began training teachers because of a recommendation from Governor James Milton Smith. The Morrill Act required all students in land-grant colleges to receive some military training and the college only had one military instructor at a time, until Congress passed the National Defense Act of 1916 and the college established an ROTC the same year.

A fire destroyed the main academic building, the old mint, in December 1878. Funds were raised over the next several years as classes were held in smaller buildings around campus. Construction began to rebuild the building on the foundations of the old mint in June 1879. In 1885 President Lewis fell ill and died. In the 1880s and 1890s the institution saw decreasing enrollment due to economic hardships in this part of the state and competition from other schools.

=== Turn of the 20th century and World War I (1900–1929) ===
In the 20th century, the world, the nation, the state, and North Georgia began to change. Although the school was isolated due to lack of good roads or railroads it was able to receive power from the generator at the Consolidated Mine to have electric lights. It also had a telephone. In 1904 Gustavus Richard Glenn became president and served until 1922 the longest tenure of any other president. Glenn had been The State School Commissioner. The Military College of Georgia was added to the title of the college.

Another fire ravaged the campus in 1911 destroying Boswick Hall, an academic building. This allowed the college to receive funds to build what was then called the industrial building in 1914. Because of the military presence of the college enrollment boomed during World War I. When Congress created the National Defense Act of 1916 that created ROTC the college used to train troops for the war and retained .

The college dropped the agricultural department and the designation from the colleges name in 1929 renaming the school as North Georgia College. Because of the depression and the over proliferation of colleges in the state the institution was reduced to junior college in 1932.

== Junior college 1932–1946 ==
The Reorganization Act of 1931 reduced the number of state colleges from 26 to 10, created Georgia's Board of Regents, and reduced NGC to the rank of junior college. Jonathan Clark Rogers became president in 1933 and set his sights on improving and expanding the campus. At this time the campus consisted of three brick buildings and two wooden ones, with more needed to allow increased enrollment. After refurbishing all the current buildings on campus, Rogers began work on constructing a women's dormitory. Completed in 1936, it was to be named Rogers Hall in honor of the president. Instead, Rogers named the building after Board of Regents chancellor Steadman Vincent Sanford. Rogers' immediate interests then turned to a men's dormitory, although he had other plans in mind. Completed in 1938, the men's dorm was named Barnes Hall after the prominent faculty member John C. "Daddy" Barnes. The next construction project for the campus is now known as the Nix Center, which at the time contained an auditorium, dining hall, and kitchen. The next building to be erected was the Stewart Library, named after Joseph Spencer Stewart, NGC's president from 1893 to 1903. The building was later named the Will D. Young Social Science Building. By 1940, the roads on campus remained largely unpaved, and the state highway department graded a circular drive and drill field that had been used as a cornfield by the college's farm.

It was during Rogers' tenure that the first PhD's joined the faculty. At the time, the governor of Georgia was Eugene Talmadge. Talmadge disagreed with President Franklin D. Roosevelt, whose policies had caused NGC and other colleges not to receive their usual share of funds during the New Deal era. Talmadge decided to remove 10 Georgia colleges from the Southern Association of Colleges and Schools, including NGC. His actions caused him to lose the next gubernatorial election to Attorney General Ellis Arnall.

In 1941, a large majority of NGC male students were called to active duty in World War II. With enrollment slowly declining as students were joined the war effort, a formal decision was made to locate an Army Specialized Training Program at the college. In 1944, just before France was invaded, the program was dismantled, but it was arranged for a reserve program to be installed. When the war ended in Europe and the GI Bill became available, many veterans flocked to NGC. Construction then began on a new science building now known as Rogers Hall.

== Senior College 1946–2013 ==
The college was reinstated as a senior college. The South's postwar was improving, including in North Georgia, and these gains would felt at NGC with more young people able to attend college.

=== Rogers years ===
With the enactment of the GI bill at the end of World War II, and Georgia emerging out of economic depression, North Georgia College was bound to grow. Rogers had proven that his plans for the physical campus were adequate, and he was dedicated to improving the faculty. The college now offered a four-year curriculum and bachelor of arts and science degrees. Majors at the time were English, business, education, psychology, chemistry, biology, math, physics/radio, history, Romance languages, and physical training. With the addition of highways US 19 to Atlanta and GA 60 to Gainesville, the college became more accessible. Although the college had just expanded its on-campus housing and had an available pool of students to draw from, enrollment nonetheless stagnated due to a lack of housing.

=== Hoag years ===
Merritt E. Hoag was named president in 1949 and served until 1970. Lewis Hall, a dormitory for women, was completed in 1951 and was named for Willie B. Lewis, the first female graduate of the college. Gaillard Hall was completed in 1953 as a barracks for the college's ROTC. It was named after Benjamin Palmer Gaillard, a member of the faculty from 1874 to 1930. A second wing was added to Gaillard Hall in 1961. The President's House was erected in 1953 behind Gaillard Hall. Memorial Hall was next to be completed, and included a large gymnasium with a stage and armory. It was named in honor of graduates who had served in the military. During the 1950s, the citizens of Dahlonega provided gold for the state capitol building in Atlanta to be gold leafed. Inspired by the results, a similar project was started to gold leaf the steeple of Price Memorial. The project wasn't complete until the 1970s. A new academic building was completed in 1965 and was named Dunlap Hall after Edgar Brown Dunlap, Charmian of the Board of Regents. Another men's dormitory was added, and an annex to Lewis Hall was opened in 1966. The dorm was called Sirmons Hall after John Sirmons, the college's registrar and dean from 1932 until 1949. When former president Jonathan Clark Rogers died in 1967, the science building was renamed Rogers Hall in his honor. Cadet enrollment stagnated during the 1960s with growing U.S. involvement in Vietnam. A new student center was built in 1969 and was eventually named for President Hoag. In 1950, the old college farm ceased to be cultivated and was renovated to become the Pine Valley Recreation Area. It is still used by the college for recreation, and includes a simulated grenade course used by the ROTC.

=== Owen years ===
John H. Owen served as president for 22 years beginning his term in 1970. One of Owen's main focuses was improving the academic standards of the college. He did this by increasing enrollment and scholarships. In 1972 a new library was completed along with a plant of operations building. In 1976 Donovan hall was completed as a female dormitory. In 1981 the Chow Hall was completed. The old dining hall was eventually converted into a fine arts building. The next year another entrance was added along GA Highway 60. The nursing program was added in 1974 when the home economics program was dropped. When GA Highway 400 was widened in 1980 it increased the accessibility of the college.

In 1973 the student affairs began a program known as INTRO. The INTRO program consisted of bringing incoming students in for orientation sessions directed by upperclassmen. This type of program has been replicated by many universities. NGC's SGA gained strength during Owen's term. It was the first to be able to allocate fees for activities and programs in the university system. It was voted most outstanding in the university system from 1985–1991. In the early 1970s the basketball team switched its name from the cadets to the Saints after a Saint Bernard dog was purchased as the mascot. The Lady Saints originally began play as the Gold Diggers in 1971.

=== Modern era ===
The newest housing on the campus is called the suites and is co-ed. The suites opened for students during the fall of 2010. In the modern era the college's population has continued to increase due to an increased commuter population. Owen retired in 1992 and was replaced temporarily by William F. Gerspacher. In 1993 Dr. Delmas J. Allen, the current Vice President of Academic Affairs was named as the president. Following Allen's resignation in 1996, Sherman R. Day was named acting president, a term which was extended until 1999. Nathaniel Hansford was president from 1999–2004. David L. Potter became president in 2005 and resigned/retired in 2011.

Bonita C. Jacobs assumed the post of president in July 2011, and in doing so, became the college's first female president. She remained as president until the 2013 merger that created UNG, and remains president of the merged school.

== List of presidents ==
Presidents of NGCSU
Name	Term	Years of service
David W. Lewis	1873–1885	12
W.S. Bassinger	1886–1893	7
Isaac Waddell	1893–1897	4
Joseph Spencer Stewart	1897–1903	6
Edward Spain Avis	1903–1904	1
Gustavus Richard Glen	1904–1922	18
Marion DuBois	1922–1925	3
John W. West	1925–1932	7
Frank G. Branch	1932–1933	1
Jonathan Clark Rogers	1933–1949	16
Merritt E. Hoag	1949–1970	21
John H. Owen	1970–1992	22
Delmas J. Allen	1993–1996	3
Sherman R. Day	1996–1999	3
Nathaniel Hansford	1999–2004	5
David L. Potter	2005–2011	6
Bonita C. Jacobs	2011–2023	11
