= History of the University of North Georgia =

The University of North Georgia was first established at the site of its current campus in Dahlonega, Georgia in 1873 as North Georgia Agricultural College (NGAC). In 2013 North Georgia College & State University was consolidated with Gainesville State College to form the University of North Georgia.

== North Georgia Agricultural College (1871-1929) ==
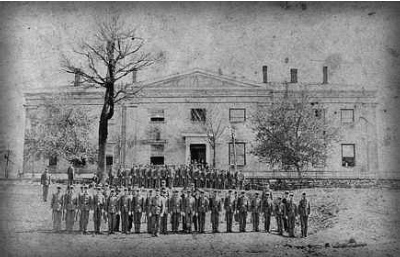
The Dahlonega Mint building in 1877 or 1878. The building was destroyed by a fire and then rebuilt as UNG's Price Memorial Hall building in 1879

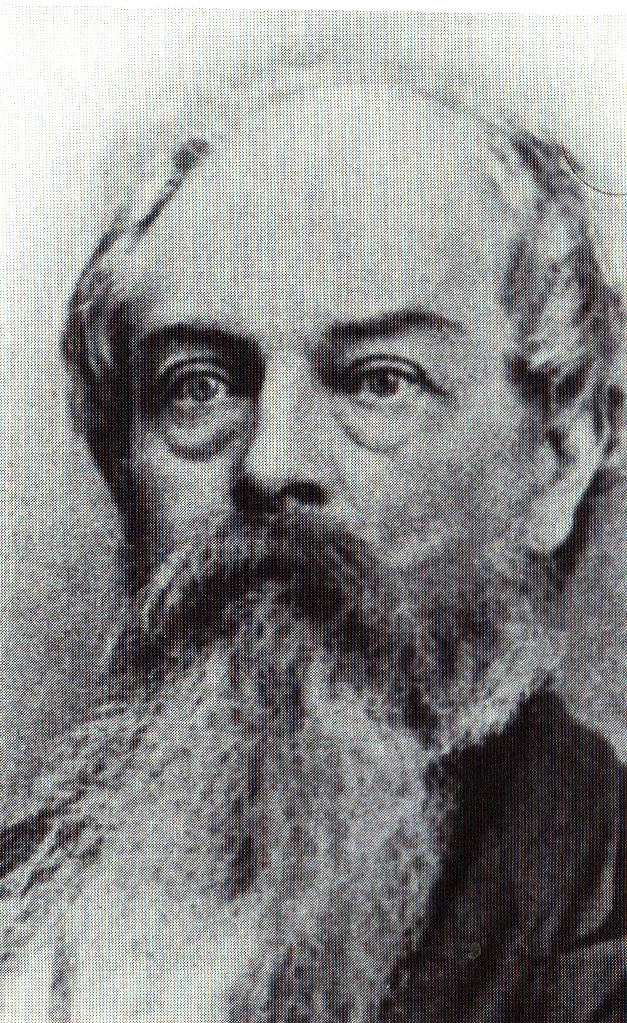
David W. Lewis was the first president of UNG (1873-1885)

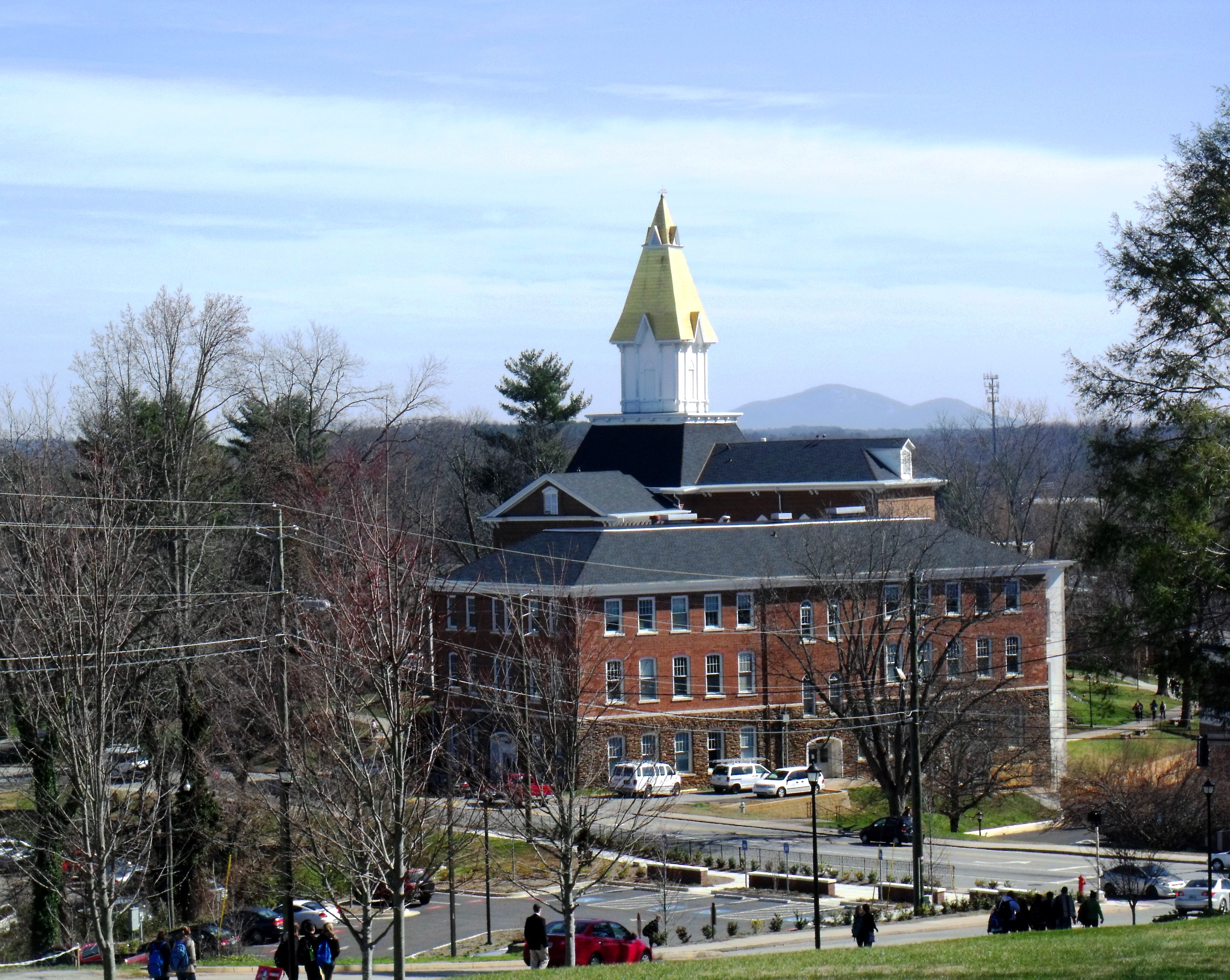
Built in 1879 at the former site of the Dahlonega Mint, the Price Memorial Hall Building is the oldest surviving building on UNG's campus.

From 1851 to 1861 (the last ten years of its use) the Dahlonega Gold Mint was minting more gold from California than from Georgia. Consequently, following the Civil War the Treasury Department felt it would be impractical to resume minting operations at the Dahlonega Mint. A few years after the war a former Confederate soldier and President of the Lumpkin County Board of Education by the name of William Pierce Price devised a plan to employ the land script of the Morrill Act to transform the old mint building into a college. In the early stages of this transformation the school was identified as an academy, rather than a university- implying that it was originally intended to serve as a feeder school for the Georgia College of Agriculture and Mechanical Arts (predecessor of the University of Georgia). However, in 1876 the Superior Court of Lumpkin County gave the school the ability to grant bachelor's and master's degrees.

The college began formally enrolling students in January 1873. In its first year, the school enrolled 98 males and 79 females, making it the first college in the state to offer co-educational enrollment. Shortly thereafter in 1878, it became the first co-ed college in the state to graduate a female student. The school's first president was David W. Lewis. Lewis was fervently devoted to the development of the institution. Upon his arrival he donated his personal library to the school. In addition to serving as the school's president, he also served as one of the two professors at the school- teaching Greek and English literature. For about the first thirty years of North Georgia Agricultural College's history it was mostly an agricultural college in name alone. It was only in 1902 that the college established its first and only agricultural chair. In essence NGAC was a liberal arts college, focusing more on courses such as law, Latin, Greek, English literature, theoretical mathematics, natural sciences, history, and philosophy. In addition to its liberal arts curriculum the college also made military training compulsory- as was stipulated by the Morrill Land Act to all land-grant colleges. This requirement marked the beginning of the University of North Georgia's enduring military identity. This military program's cadet corps eventually became involved in the newly established Reserve Officers' Training Corps(ROTC) in 1916.

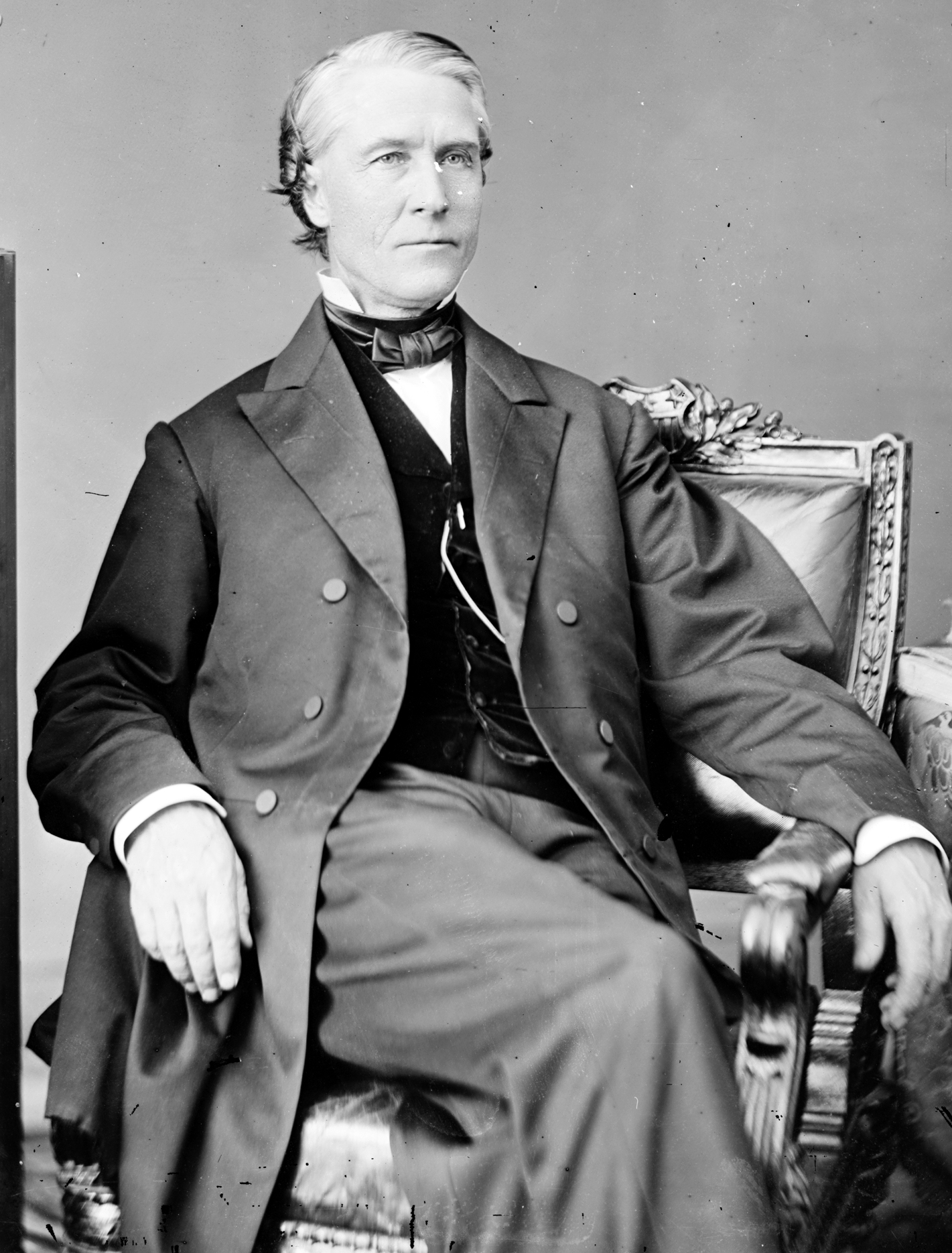
William P. Price

In the early years of the twentieth century the school's isolated and underdeveloped mountainous location precluded its growth. Even when Lumpkin County did receive its first railroad in the 1910s there was still no direct rail to Dahlonega. Price's death in 1911 added to the school's struggle, as he was by far its most prominent supporter. In that same year a fire consumed Bostwick Hall as well as a large portion of the school's library. Consequently, the destruction of these facilities hindered NGAC's ability to accommodate and house all of the applicants that sought enrollment at the school. The hardships faced by NGAC were further compounded during the 1920s by a series of ineffectual and unpopular school presidents. In the final years of his presidency Gustavus R. Glenn found disfavor with the trustees. Many of them felt that his competency had been compromised by the complacency that he had developed during the service of his lengthy presidency (1904-1922: the longest presidency in NGAC history up to that point). Glenn resigned before the trustees ever attempted to remove him. He was replaced by the more ambitious Marion DuBose who served as president for a mere three years. DuBose was criticized for trying to implement to much change to the college too quickly. Efforts of his such as working to disband the preparatory department, and eliminating the BS and AB degrees in agriculture were seen by much of the faculty and students as too progressive and needlessly ardent. Eighty-four students, roughly half of the student population, signed a petition expressing their dissatisfaction with DuBose's performance, however it did nothing to affect his presidency. In 1925 pressure from alumni finally persuaded DuBose to resign. Throughout the remainder of the 1920s conditions for NGAC began to improve. Infrastructural improvements such as a new modernized waterworks, the addition of female dormitories, and a new bus line from Gainesville to Dahlonega helped to improve the image and accessibility of the school. During a 1928 visit to the school, Governor Lamartine Hardman admiringly noticed the improved state of the university's campus and declared that he would seek a greater appropriation for the institution.

== North Georgia College ==
=== Reduction to a junior college (Great Depression and World War II) ===
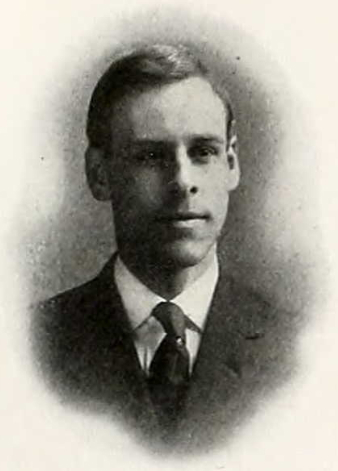
Jonathan Clark Rogers in a 1909 yearbook photo.

NGAC's agricultural department was eliminated in 1929 and the school formally became known as North Georgia College (NGC). The economic onslaught of the Great Depression led the Board of Regents to reduce NGC to a junior college. Although the state of Georgia was allocated $250 million by President Roosevelt's New Deal it was not enough to entirely alleviate the financial distress of many of the state's colleges, including NGC. There was initially discussion about closing NGC all together because of the school's dramatically declining student enrollment and its inconvenient geographic location. However, this consideration was ultimately rejected the idea. This reclassification as a junior college caused all of the military elements pertaining to NGC, particularly the ROTC program, to be temporarily discontinued. When NGC was reorganized into a junior college Jonathan Clark Rogers became president of the school. Between 1933 and 1946 his efforts helped to make NGC the largest junior college in the state. Recent administrations, particularly that of John W. West (1925-1932), had struggled to meet accreditation standards due to the subpar qualifications of much of the college's faculty. Rogers addressed this problem directly by hiring the college's first PhDs. By the end of his term, all but one faculty member held a masters or doctorate degree. During his presidency enrollment grew from 160 to 702 students. He is often credited with being one of the primary figures responsible for NGC regaining its status as a senior college. Rogers made every effort to benefit from Governor Eurith Rivers' "Little New Deal". Making use of this program Rogers' leadership oversaw the construction and expansion of numerous buildings and facilities on campus. During his presidency the school saw the addition of Sanford Hall, Barnes Hall, Moore Hall, a new library, a new infirmary, and a new auditorium.

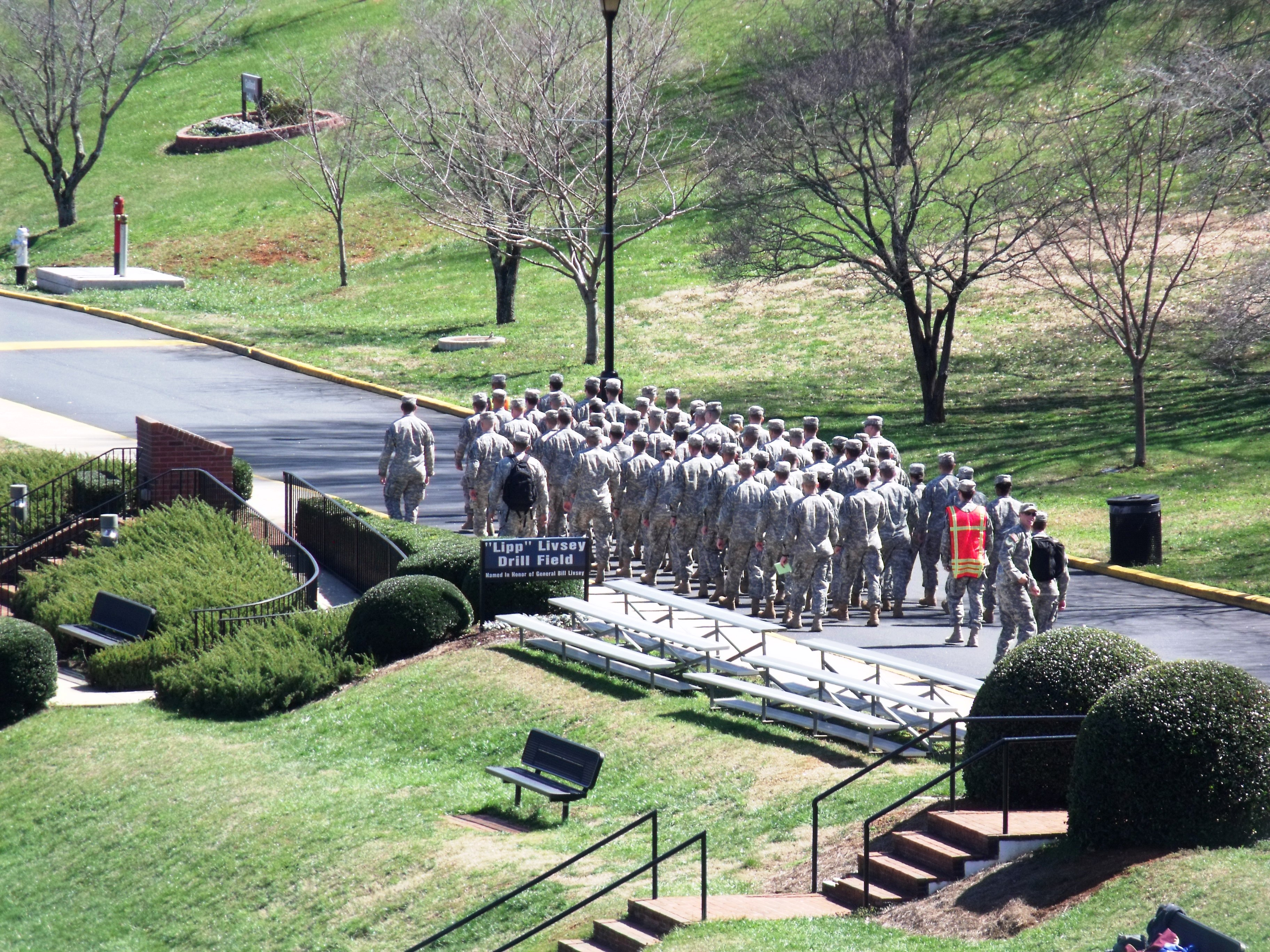
ROTC cadets marching past the "Lipp" Livsey Field Drill Field at UNG's Dahlonega campus (2013).

The growth seen under the Rogers administration was curtailed by the United States' involvement in World War II following the Japanese attack on Pearl Harbor in 1941. Throughout 1943 enrollment dropped and the school's military program was halved. In spite of the declining enrollment and economic hardship Rogers worked diligently to satisfy the Army's standards in order to preserve NGC's military program. Not only was the military integrity of NGC preserved, but during this time it was the only junior college in the nation to have an (ASTP) Army Specialized Training Program. On the eve of the Allied forces' invasion of German-occupied France war demands of the U.S. Army caused the ASTP at NGC to be discontinued. As a response Rogers succeeded in acquiring an Army Specialized Training Reserve Program (ASTRP) in lieu of the school's lost ASTP. By the end of the war NGC had trained close to 1,300 cadets through its involvement in ASTP and ASTRP. North Georgia College returned to operating at full capacity as soon as the war ended. The return of WWII soldier to civilian life compounded with the recently passed G.I. Bill to result in an influx in college enrollment all throughout the nation. Upon regaining this momentum Rogers immediately resumed work on his ambitious expansion and construction projects. The alumni were impressed by Rogers' achievement following the war, and they began to advocate for the reversion of the school back into a senior college. On the other hand, Rogers was in favor of the school remaining a junior college that would specialize in technical training and preparatory programs. Regardless of Rogers' preferences, in 1946 the Board of Regents declared their intention to revert the school back into a senior college.

=== Reversion to a senior college ===
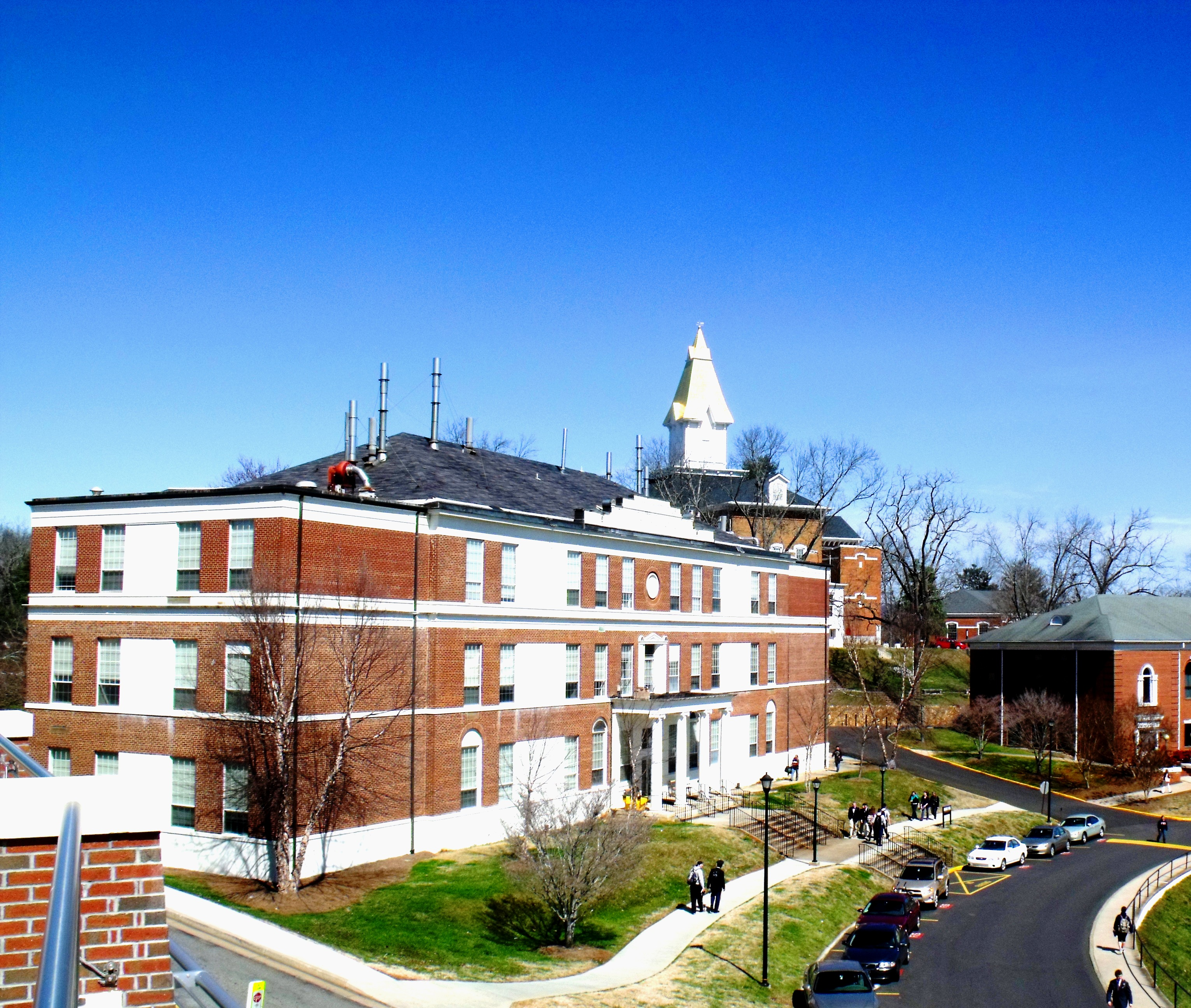
Rogers Hall was opened in 1946 for the use of NGC's science department. The gold-leafed steeple of Price Memorial Hall can be seen in the background

North Georgia College regained its senior status in 1947. An estimated 210 of the 710 students attending the school in that year were veterans of WWII benefiting from the G.I. Bill. During the 1950s the manufacturing sector became dominant over agriculture in Georgia's economy. Taking advantage of the state's new-found wealth the Georgia General Assembly decided to begin levying a 3% sales tax. What's more, in 1958, the Soviet's launch of Sputnik catalyzed the passing of the National Defense Education Act by Congress, which acted as a financial buttress to the American public education system at every level. These conditions created a more than an ample supply of government revenue for education in Georgia. Between 1959 and 1963 the top salary for a full professor in Georgia rose from $7,000 to $9,000. For the first time since the Civil War Georgia was beginning to progress out of it backwards economically underdeveloped condition. In the state's new favorable economical environment Rogers was able to secure a $29,000 increase in annual appropriations for the college as well as nearly $400,000 for new construction projects. Roughly $300,000 of this money was used in the construction of the a new science building that was eventually named after Rogers following his death in 1967. Upon the completion of all of the construction carried out in the late 1940s the school was finally able to adequately accommodate all of its academic needs. However the college was still in desperate need of student housing.

==== The Hoag Administration ====
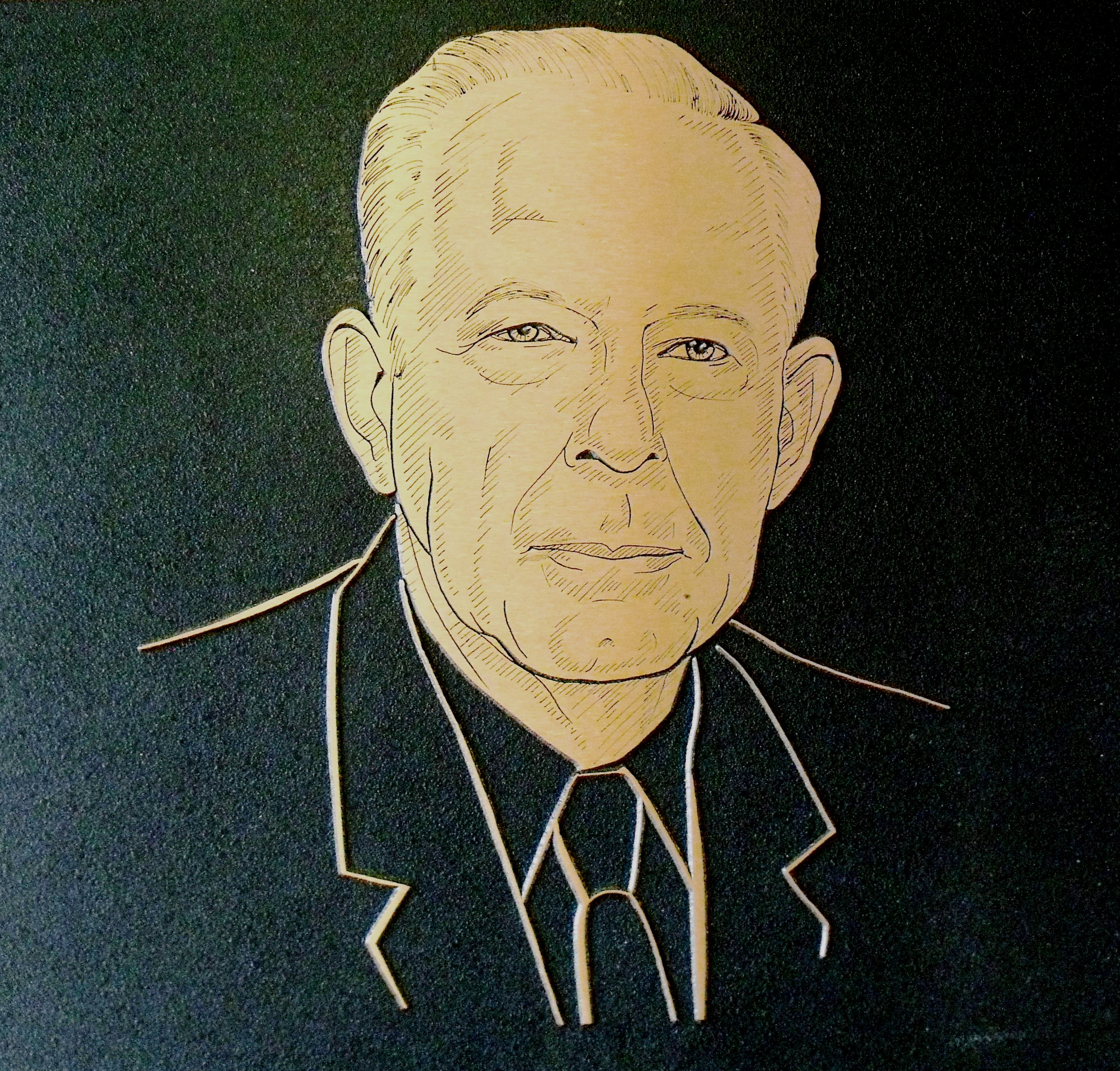
A commemorative plaque of Merritt E. Hoag

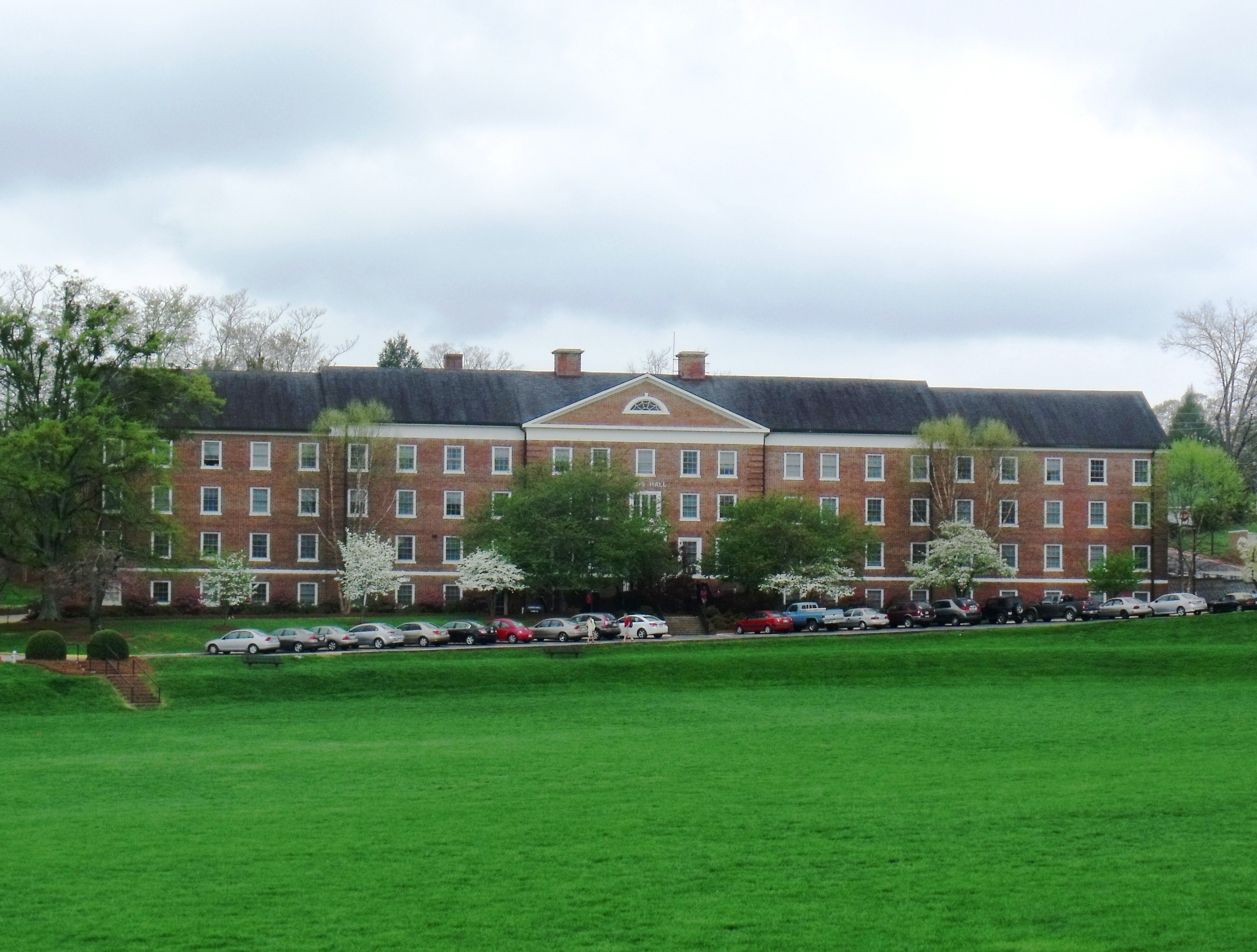
Lewis Hall was built in 1951 allowed the NGC to house twice as many female students.

A former dean of the school by the name of Merritt Eldred Hoag succeeded Roger in the presidency. Several significant augmentation were made to the college during the Hoag years. It was during his presidency, in 1970, that the school's ROTC program expanded from an infantry program to Branch General, which allowed graduates to select which branch of service they would go into following their graduation. Under the Hoag administration the college carried on with a healthy expansion and steady series of construction projects. NGC's desperate campus-housing need was met in 1951 with the opening of the new Lewis Hall dormitory, which allowed the school to house twice as many female students. Despite this substantial addition to student housing on campus the school still in need of a new boys' dormitory. In 1955 Gaillard Hall was constructed for $350,000 at the site of what was previously the college's cattle field. With the addition of the Memorial Hall, a few years later, the college's campus reached a total area of 186 acres. The extensive building endeavors of UNG in the 1950s continued well into the 1960s. The gubernatorial administrations of Carl Sanders and subsequently Lester Maddox fostered an unprecedented era of educational development in Georgia during the 1960s. However the late 1960s also brought with it an increase of public apprehension towards military colleges. Although UNG received less funds during this decade, it was still receiving a greater amount of funds than it had at any point in its history. In 1964 the board of regents allocated roughly $1.8 million to the university to be used for the construction of new campus facilities. Perhaps the most recognizable structure made possible by this funding was the new academic building that was named for Edgar Brown Dunlap, who was the former chairman of the Board of Regents. The new Dunlap building allowed for the much needed expansion of the business administration, mathematics, English, and modern languages departments. Shortly thereafter was the construction of Sirmons Hall and the Lewis Hall annex, which were able to house 975 students collectively. Attendance at the college was further bolstered when, in 1968, it began to admit nonmilitary commuter students (not living in college-affiliated housing) for the first time. This alteration could also be seen as the beginning of NGC's scholastic interaction with GSC (then Gainesville Junior College), as it allowed students of the junior college to complete their education at NGC. The final, and perhaps most recognizable, addition to the UNG campus under the Hoag administration was the Student Center, which was built in 1969. It was a four-story steel structure which featured a patio, canteen, dining room, post office, theater, a music room, and lounges. Less than a year after the construction of the Student Center that would later bear his name, Merritt E. Hoag retired. By the end of his presidency in July 1970 Hoag had served in the position longer than any of his predecessors. This record has only ever been surpassed by his successor, John H. Owen, who served one year longer than Hoag.

One of the most controversial social issues that Hoag faced during his presidency was racial integration in colleges and universities. From the end of the Civil War to 1961 Georgia applied a separate but equal policy to all educational institutions in the state. It was because of the state's constitution, which stated that public funding would be cut to all racially integrated institutions, that segregation in Georgia's educational establishments continued seven years after the Supreme Court case Brown v. Board of Education in 1954. One of the first black applicants to NGC was a girl by the name of Mary Wilson, who, in 1951, wrote a letter to Hoag inquiring of the possibility of her admission to the college. Instead of answering directly, Hoag referred the letter to the Board of Regents, which simply reiterated the state's prohibition of racial integration in schools. It wasn't until 1967 that a man by the name of Kenneth Rouse became the first black student to be admitted to NGC.

==== The Owen Administration ====
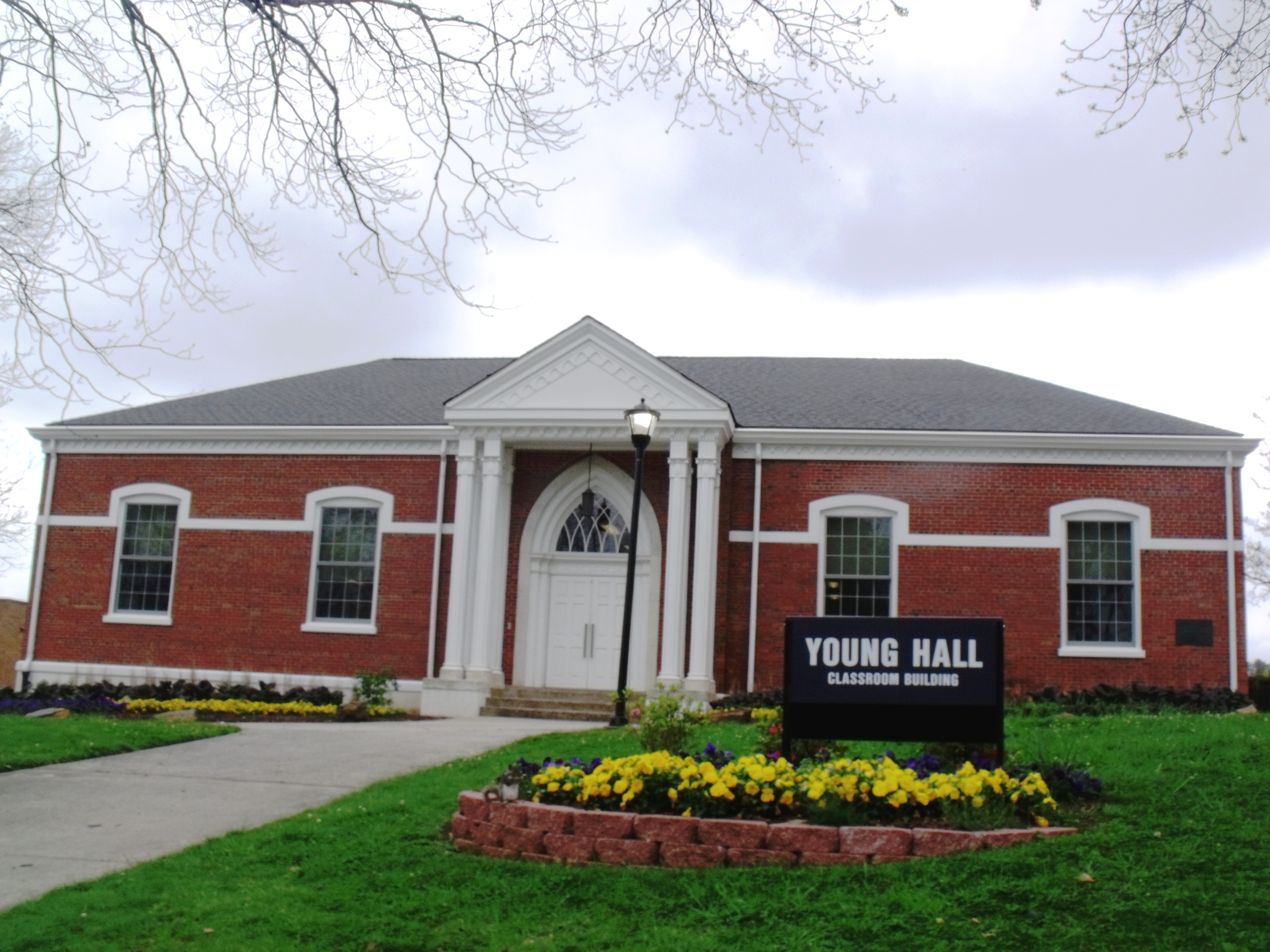
Young Hall - formerly known as the Will D. Young Social Science Center

Following Hoag's retirement in 1970, former UGA professor John H. Owen became the president of North Georgia College. The ambitious building achievements of the previous Rogers and Hoag administrations allowed Owen to focus on issues other than a need to expand facilities. Upon assuming the presidency, Owen made increasing faculty salaries and the school's overall budget among his top priorities. He stressed that the only means by which this could be achieved was a significant increase in student enrollment. Owen had many political resources at his disposal by which his budgetary objectives could eventually be realized. He was friends with much of the Georgia General Assembly, including NGC alumni and Speaker of the Georgia House of Representatives Tom Murphy, as well as President Jimmy Carter, who was the governor of Georgia and then the president of the United States throughout the first decade of Owen's presidency. By the end of Owen's service in 1992 student enrollment had grown by threefold; whereas Hoag had managed to only doubled enrollment during roughly the same amount of time.

One of the first initiative of Owen's administration was to develop an alumni association for the college. The enhanced alumni association, in many ways, complimented the North Georgia College Foundation (NGCF), which was founded during the Hoag years to provide matching funds for federal student loans. Under the leadership of Owen the endowment of funds provided by the NGCF grew from one to five million dollars. Much of this money was used for student scholarships, of which there were none at the beginning of Owen's presidency. By the end of his presidency NGC offered over 300 scholarships, many of them funded by the NGCF. These scholarships not only helped to grow student enrollment, but they also attracted a higher caliber of students. In 1974 NGC began offering its first graduate program, which was a master's degree in education. Owen was determined to direct and develop the course of the University's expansion. In 1977 he created the Planning for the Future Committee. This committee comprised two subcommittees, one of which focused on academic facilities and the other, which focused on needed academic programs. One of the first major construction projects under the Owen administration was the renovation of the old library in 1974. The renovation came from social science departments' need for updated facilities. At a cost of $450,000 it was converted into a lecture hall and general purpose building. It was named the Will D. Young Social Science Center (now known as Young Hall) in honor of former dean William Donnell Young, who also briefly served as acting president before immediately before the appointment of Hoag to the position.

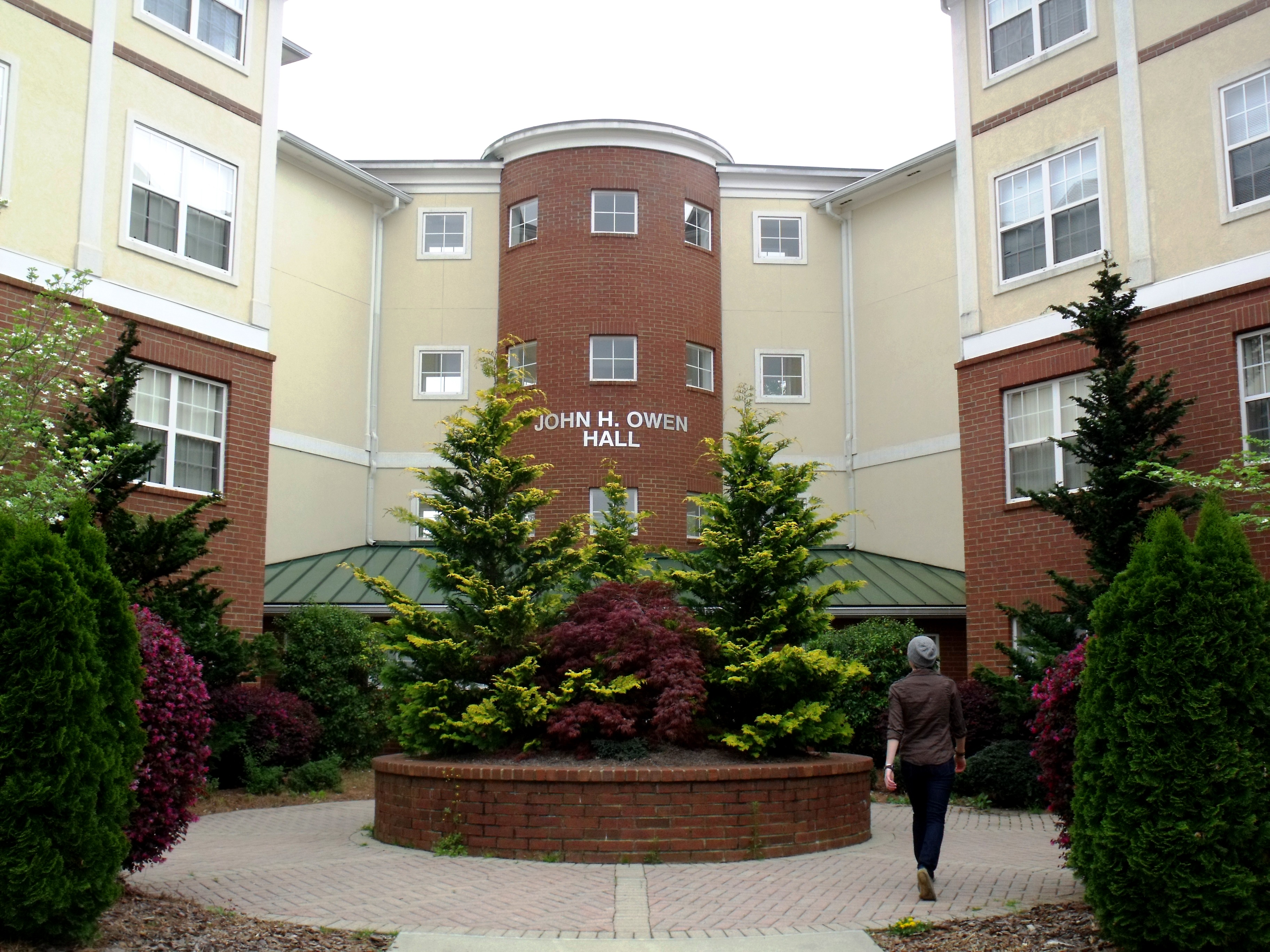
John H. Owen Hall, opened in 2002, was the first private apartment-style residence hall on campus.

By the early 1970s war-weariness had taken a toll on NGC's ROTC program. Negative public perception of the Korean War and the Vietnam War significantly curtailed enthusiasm for such military programs. Regardless, the Owen administration was able to promote enrollment among non-cadet students. During his presidency the college experienced a large increase in non-cadet and commuter students. From 1970 to 1985 the student population at the school increased from 1,151 to 2,023. Owen's success with increasing student enrollment brought with it a new demand for facilities. By 1976 there were more female than male students on campus. At a cost of roughly $2.1 million, a new girls dormitory was built to accommodate the increased population. The new dormitory was named Donovan Hall, after former dean of women Alice Donovan. The construction of Donovan Hall allowed the former girls dormitory, Barnes Hall, to be converted into administrative offices. Owen's presidency also saw the construction of a new $1 million planetarium (1991), a new psychology laboratory, and a $250,000 addition to the gymnasium. Around the time of the end of Owen's presidency the Board of Regents authorized an addition to Dunlap Hall at the expense of $4,000,000. When Owen left the school in 1992 the campus could comfortably accommodate up to 3,500 students.

Just as much as Owen was concerned with the quantity of students at NGC, he was just as concerned with the quality of the student body. Elevating academic standards was a high priority of Owen. He saw a direct positive correlation between the caliber of the faculty and the quality of the students. In the first ten years of Owen's presidency professors' salaries doubled, from $16,866 to $33,200. He also managed to secure funding, from public and private sources, for the purpose of faculty research, which was nonexistent before Owen. Natural science departments were particularly large beneficiaries of this research initiative. In the late 1980s the Natural science departments received roughly $125,000 from the National Science Foundation for new laboratory equipment. The effects of this and other similar financial investment in the school's science programs was evident. At the end of Owen's term, NGC graduates saw a sixty percent acceptance rate to the Medical College of Georgia, compared to the average rate of thirteen percent among other colleges in Georgia. The augmentations made to the natural science departments during the 1980s spilled over into other related areas such as engineering and mathematics. It was in this decade the NGC acquired its first computer lab and a diagnostic and tutorial laboratory. The college gained twenty more computers in the 1990s for its new $80,000 language lab in Dunlap Hall.

Near the end of Owen's presidency North Georgia College took another step in its scholastic cooperation with Gainesville College. By the mid 1980s Gainesville College had developed a relatively robust two-year business program for a college of its size and endowment. In 1988 Owen successfully persuaded the regents to allow NGC to offer two different bachelor of business degrees at the Gainesville campus.

== Post-Owen Era & NGCSU ==
Following Owen's retirement in the summer of 1992 William F. Gerspacher, the college's vice president of business and finance, was appointed as the interim president of NGC. Gerspacher served as acting president for only eleven months. He has no interest in a long term presidency at the school. On the subject he remarked that it would be "inappropriate for both students and faculty to make a lot of changes." Instead, he elected to maintain a steady development along the course established by the Owen administration. During Gerspacher's brief time as president the college's annual endowment increased by $350,000 to a grand total of $5,000,000.

On October 5, 1993 Dr. Delmas James Allen became the first president of NGC to be formally inaugurated. Allen's presidency continued until 1996, at which time NGC attained university status and was renamed North Georgia College & State University (NGCSU). In August 1996 Dr. Sherman R. Day became the first president of NGCSU. During Day's presidency a historical renovation made to Price Memorial Hall. Day's presidency lasted only three years, concluding in 1999. Originally Day came to the school as an interim president. In the summer of 1997 he agreed to serve in the position throughout the 1998–1999 school year. In 2012 Day came out of retirement to serve as executive director for new University Center at UNG's Dahlonega Campus.

Nathaniel Hansford, a Korean War veteran and the former dean of the School of Law at the University of Alabama, assumed the presidency after Day. It was during his five-year presidency that NGCSU saw the construction of some of the campus's largest buildings. John H. Owen Hall, opened in 2002, was the first private apartment-style residence hall at the University. At the time of its opening it was the tallest building on campus.

== Gainesville State College ==
The economic recovery experienced by the state of Georgia in the 1950s brought with it a more diversified array of vocational opportunity to the region. This diversity created a healthy demand for workers with a liberal arts education as well as workers with various technical skill sets. Gainesville State College, established on March 11, 1964, was intended to satisfy this demand. It was first a community college formally known as Gainesville Junior College. In the fall of 1966 classes officially began at Gainesville Junior College; 419 students were enrolled in the school during its first semester. For the first year of its existence the college did not have its own campus. Instead it held classes at the Gainesville Civic Center and the First Baptists Church of Gainesville. In 1967, through a $2 million bond issue, Hall County and the city of Gainesville constructed facilities for the school at what is now its present location near I-985 on the outskirts of Oakwood.

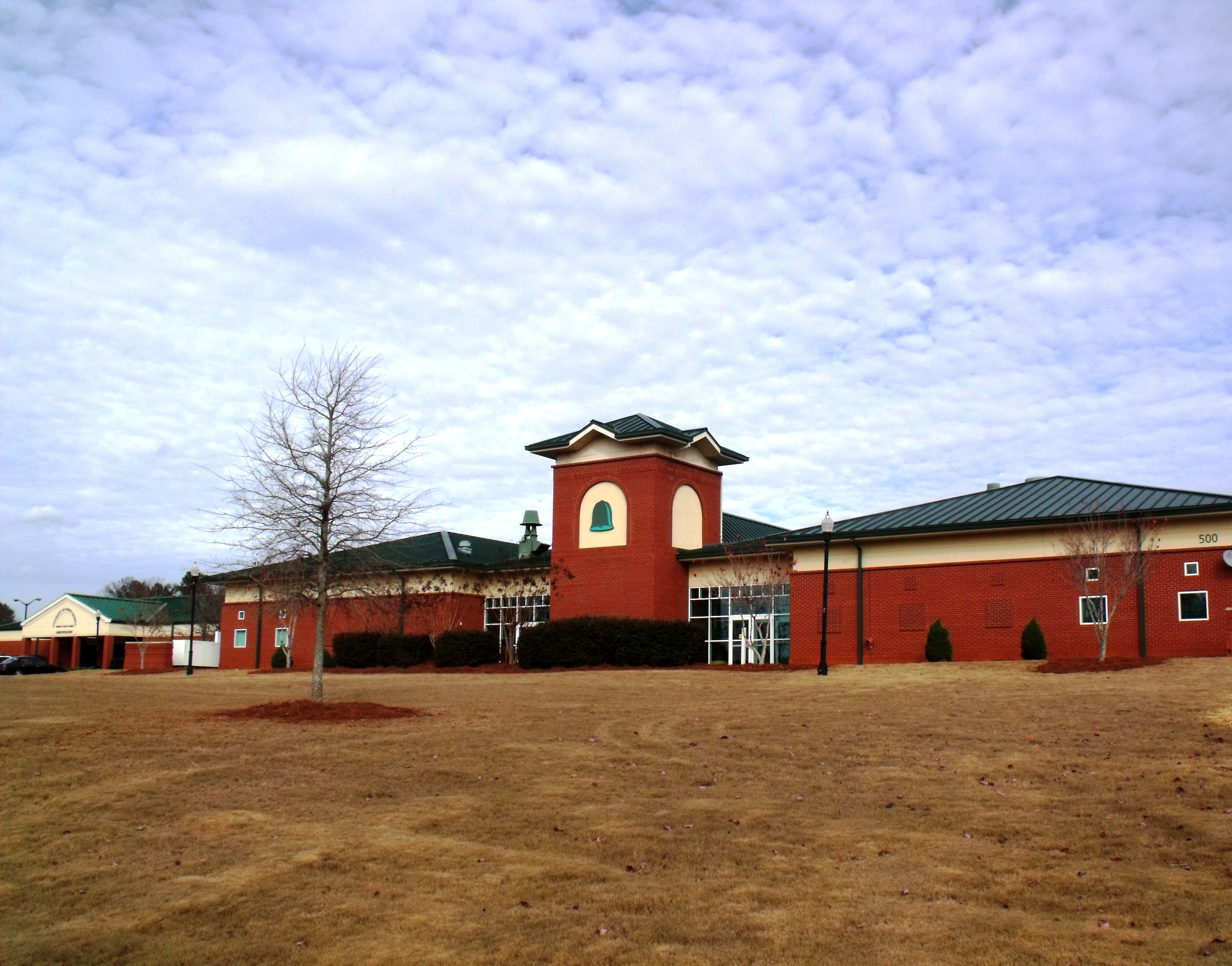
The Administration Building of UNG's Oconee Campus, located in Watkinsville, Georgia, was opened in 2009.

Under the leadership of its first president, Hugh M. Mills Jr., the college enjoyed a steady and stout growth throughout its early years. The unanticipated rapid initial expansion required a tripling of its facilities during the 1960s and early 1970s. In the early 1980s J. Foster Watkins replaced Mills as the school's president. At the beginning of the Watkins administration GSC underwent a brief growth-spurt. This period was defined by increased construction activity as well as the initiation of the school's first four-year degree program, which was in the field of business administration. Another landmark of the Watkins era was the renaming of the institution as Gainesville College in 1987. At the end of Watkins's presidency the college's endowment had reached $4 million- the greatest of any two-year college in Georgia at the time. In 1997 Martha T. Nesbitt replaced Foster as the president of GSC. Her administration helped to cultivate a more significant and meaningful role between GSC and the community. In the early 2000s the college began a collaborative effort with the University of North Georgia to conduct research and analysis on the Chattahoochee River Basin.

GSC experienced unprecedented development throughout the first decade of the 2000s. In the Fall of 2000 the Gainesville State College University Center was established at GSC. The center enabled the college to synchronize some of the coursework of its two-year with other baccalaureate degree granting institutions in the state. North Georgia College & State University was one of the institutions to work with GSC through this program. In spring of 2001 GSC opened a satellite campus in Athens, Georgia. The first semester at that campus began in the following fall with an enrollment of roughly 200 students. Student enrollment at the Athens campus increased three-fold over the next year. In 2003 GSC relocated the Athens campus to the smaller and more rural nearby town of Watkinsville, Georgia (commonly referred to as the 'Oconee Campus'). Local demand for the coursework and services offered at the Oconee campus continued to swell over the several subsequent years. By 2009 enrollment at the school had surged to 2,352.

== List of presidents ==
Presidents of NGAC, NGC, NGCSU, & UNG
Name	Term	Years of Service
David W. Lewis	1873–1885	12
William Starr Basinger	1886–1893	7
Isaac W. Waddell	1893–1897	4
Joseph Spencer Stewart	1897–1903	6
Edward Spain Avis	1903–1904	1
Gustavus Richard Glenn	1904–1922	18
Marion DuBois	1922–1925	3
John W. West	1925–1932	7
Frank G. Branch	1932–1933	1
Jonathan Clark Rogers	1933–1949	16
Merritt E. Hoag	1949–1970	21
John H. Owen	1970–1992	22
Delmas J. Allen	1993–1996	3
Sherman R. Day	1996–1999	3
Nathaniel Hansford	1999–2004	5
David L. Potter	2005–2011	6
Bonita C. Jacobs	2011–2023	12
Michael Shannon	2023–present	2

Presidents of GSC
Name	Term	Years of Service
Hugh M. Mills Jr.	1966-1983	17
J. Foster Watkins	1983-1997	14
Martha T. Nesbitt	1997-2012	15
Randy Pierce	2012-2013	1

== Timeline ==
Lewis
Basinger
Waddell
Stewart
Glenn
West
Rogers
Merritt E. Hoag
John H. Owen
Allen
Day
Hansford
Potter
Jacobs
North Georgia Agricultural College
North Georgia College
NGCSU
UNG
│
1873
│
1878
│
1883
│
1888
│
1893
│
1898
│
1903
│
1908
│
1913
│
1918
│
1923
│
1928
│
1933
│
1938
│
1943
│
1948
│
1953
│
1958
│
1963
│
1968
│
1973
│
1978
│
1983
│
1988
│
1993
│
1998
│
2003
│
2008
│
2013
│
2018
│
2023
History of University of North Georgia (presidents & college names)
Hugh M. Mills Jr.
J. Foster Watkins
Martha T. Nesbitt
Gainesville Junior College
Gainesville College
Gainesville State College
│
1964
│
1966
│
1968
│
1970
│
1972
│
1974
│
1976
│
1978
│
1980
│
1982
│
1984
│
1986
│
1988
│
1990
│
1992
│
1994
│
1996
│
1998
│
2000
│
2002
│
2004
│
2006
│
2008
│
2010
│
2012
History of Gainesville State College (presidents & college names)[

== See also ==
- Dahlonega, Georgia
- Gainesville State College
- History of Georgia (U.S. state)
- List of colleges and universities in Georgia (U.S. state)
- North Georgia
- North Georgia College & State University
- Reserve Officers' Training Corps
- University of North Georgia
