= John H. Owen =

University president

12th President of the University of North Georgia
- In office 1970–1992
- Preceded by: Merritt E. Hoag
- Succeeded by: Delmas J. Allen

Personal details
- Born: June 22, 1922 Savannah, Georgia
- Died: February 15, 2011 (aged 88) Gainesville, Georgia
- Spouse: Margaret Wilson
- Children: Cathy Owen Scheffer, Karen Owen Gormley
- Education: University of Florida Northwestern University University of Wisconsin

John H. Owen (June 22, 1922 – February 15, 2011) was the twelfth president of the University of North Georgia (UNG) and a lieutenant commander in the United States Navy during the Second World War. He was the president of UNG for twenty-two years, longer than any other president in the university's history.

== Early life ==
John H. Owen was born in Savannah, Georgia on June 22, 1922, though he lived in Quincy, Florida from his early childhood to his early 20s. Following high school, he attended the University of Florida and earned a B.S. in three years with honours. He then attended Northwestern University in Chicago until becoming enlisted in the Navy in 1943. The three years of his Naval service during World War II were spent in the North Atlantic, Mediterranean Sea, Pacific, Philippines, China Sea, Korea, Japan, and Okinawa Island. Following his service in the War, Owen resumed his Education at the University of Wisconsin. There he majored in plant pathology and biochemistry. In only five semesters he earned two Master's and one Doctorate degree. Upon completion of his education, Owen became a member of the U.S. Naval Reserve Research Units in Gainesville, Fl, a position that he held from 1949 to 1969. He reached the rank of lieutenant commander in 1964.

== Service in education ==
The first professional position held by Owen in the field of education was as a professor in the Department of Plant Pathology at his alma mater, the University of Florida. During the ten years he spent there, Owen published upwards of thirty articles in national scientific journals. In 1958, his final year at UF, he was voted professor of the year.

In 1959 Owen became professor of plant pathology and plant genetics at the University of Georgia. He is commonly credited as the primary actor in UGA's acquisition of its multimillion-dollar plant-science building. While at the university, Owen invested a good amount of his time and energy working with the United States Forest Service. It was through his work with the USFS that he was able to establish the forest pathology division in his department. Much research efforts were also devoted to the study of disease in subtropical plants. The attention and renown he received in this specific area of study brought him many invitations, most from the Organization of American States, to give lectures in Cuba, Costa Rica, Guatemala, Puerto Rico, In 1968 Owen was promoted to director of all agricultural experiment stations in the state of Georgia.

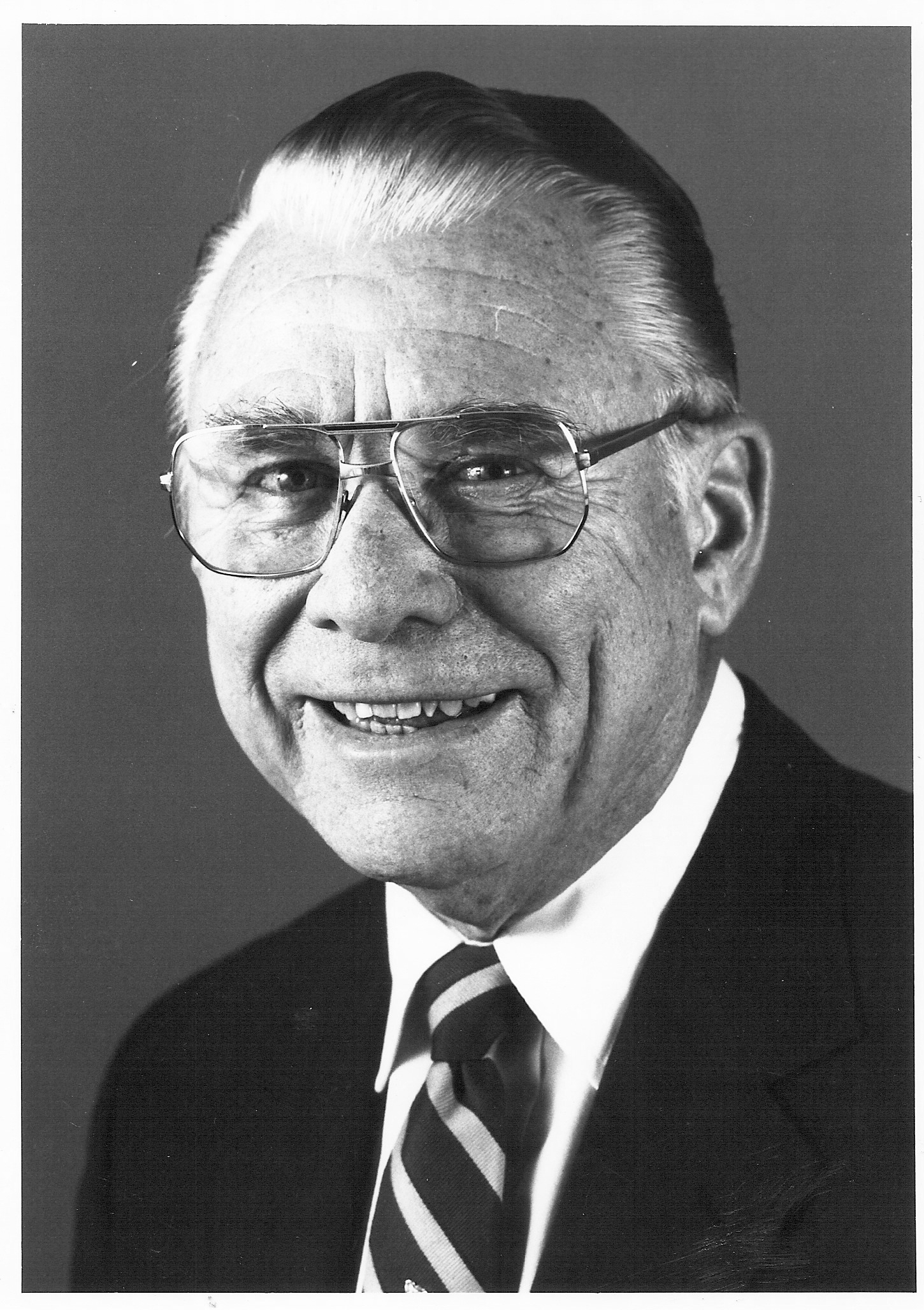
John H. Owen President of North Georgia College 1970-1992

=== North Georgia College ===
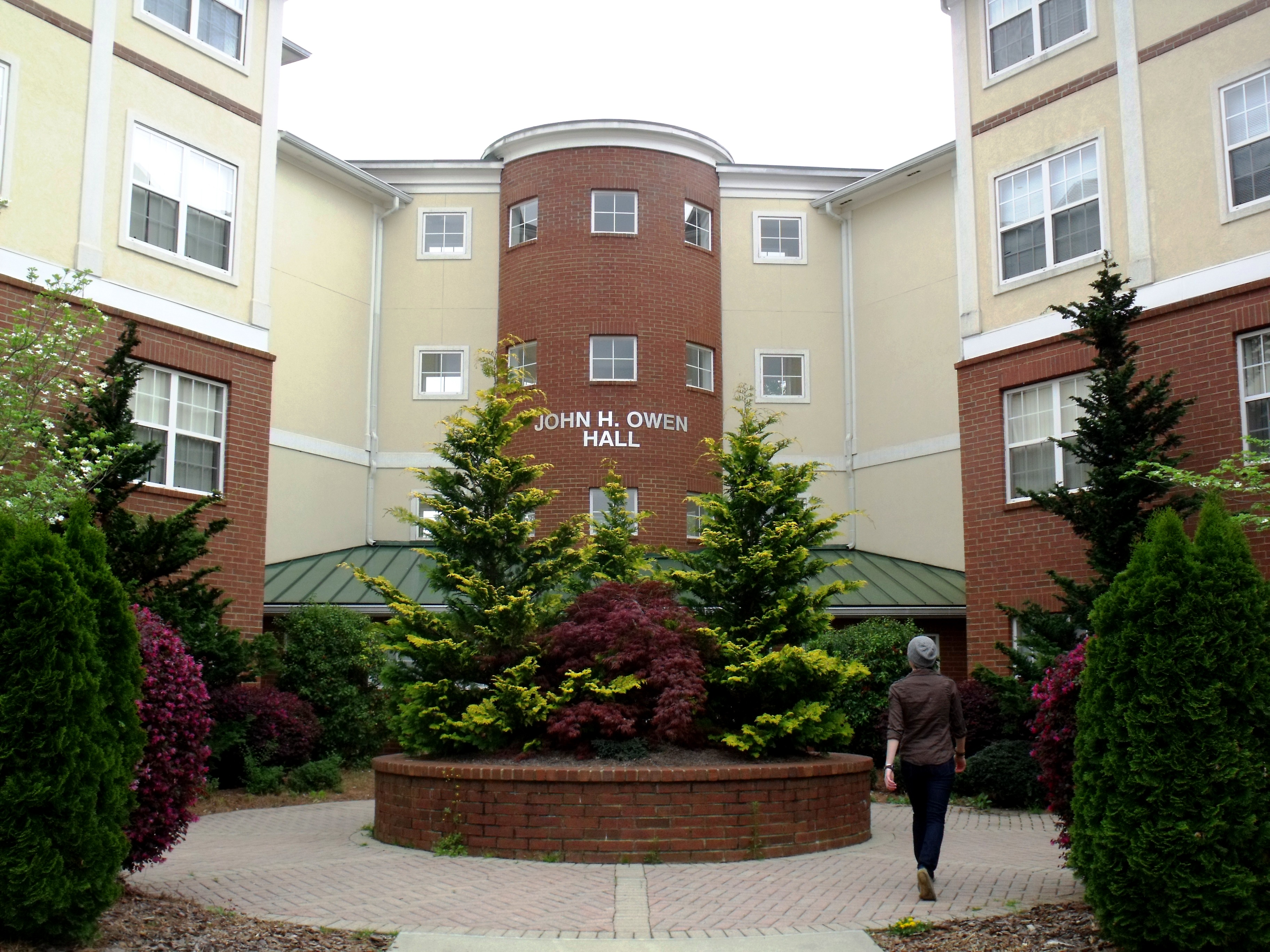
Owens Hall student dormitory at the University of North Georgia

In 1970, Owen succeeded Merritt Eldred Hoag as president North Georgia College (now known as the University of North Georgia). His predecessors, Hoag and Rogers, had devoted much of their presidency to building projects. It was because of their work that Owen was able to divert his energy elsewhere, away from new construction projects. Instead, Owen focused on increasing student enrollment, which would in turn increase the school's budget and faculty salary. He was assisted in this endeavor by many of the friends he had in the Georgia General Assembly as well as his longtime friend Governor/President Jimmy Carter.
