= Gustavus Richard Glenn =

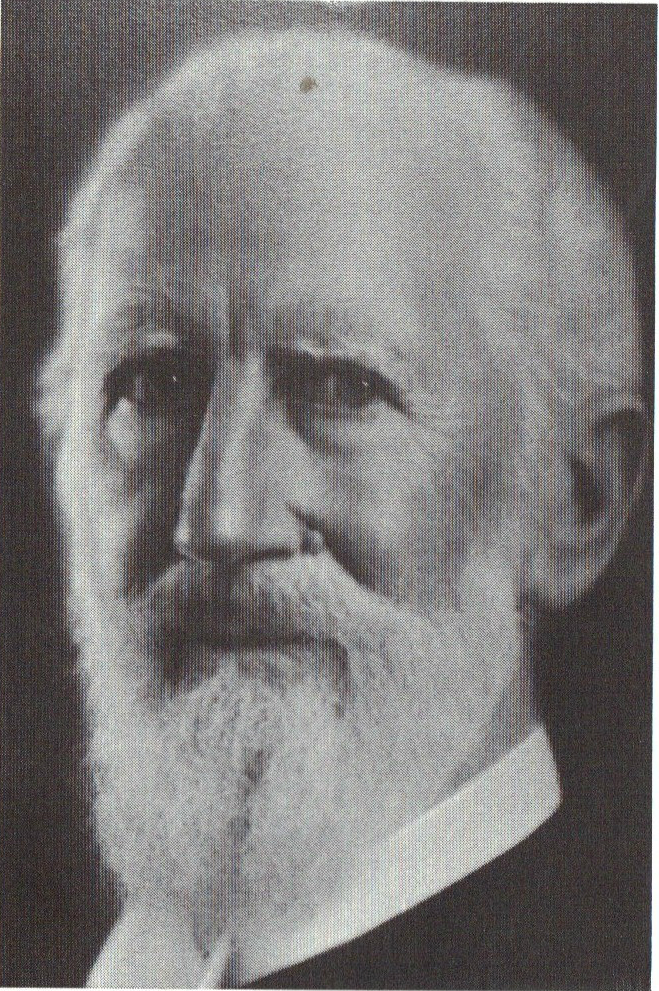
- Isaac W. Waddell

6th President of the University of North Georgia
- In office 1904–1922
- Preceded by: Edward Spain Avis
- Succeeded by: Marion DuBois

Personal details
- Born: 5 December 1848 Jefferson, Georgia
- Died: 23 January 1939 (aged 90) Atlanta, Georgia
- Spouse: Rosa Ellen Verstille
- Education: University of Georgia
- Profession: educator

Gustavus Richard Glenn (December 5, 1848 – January 23, 1939) was the sixth President of the University of North Georgia.

== Early life ==
Gustavus R. Glenn was born in Jefferson County, Georgia, on December 5, 1848, to James Russell and Anne Williams Glenn. His maternal grandmother was a first cousin to President Zachary Taylor.

== Service in education ==
The first professional position held by Glenn on a collegiate level was as president of Columbus Female College, which he began in 1875. He remained in this position until a fire destroyed much of the college's campus in 1884. In the same year, Glenn became a professor of physics at Wesleyan College in Macon, Georgia. He served at Wesleyan College until 1893, at which point he became the State School Commissioner.

In the summer of 1904, Glen was elected president of North Georgia Agricultural College.
