= William P. Price =

American politician

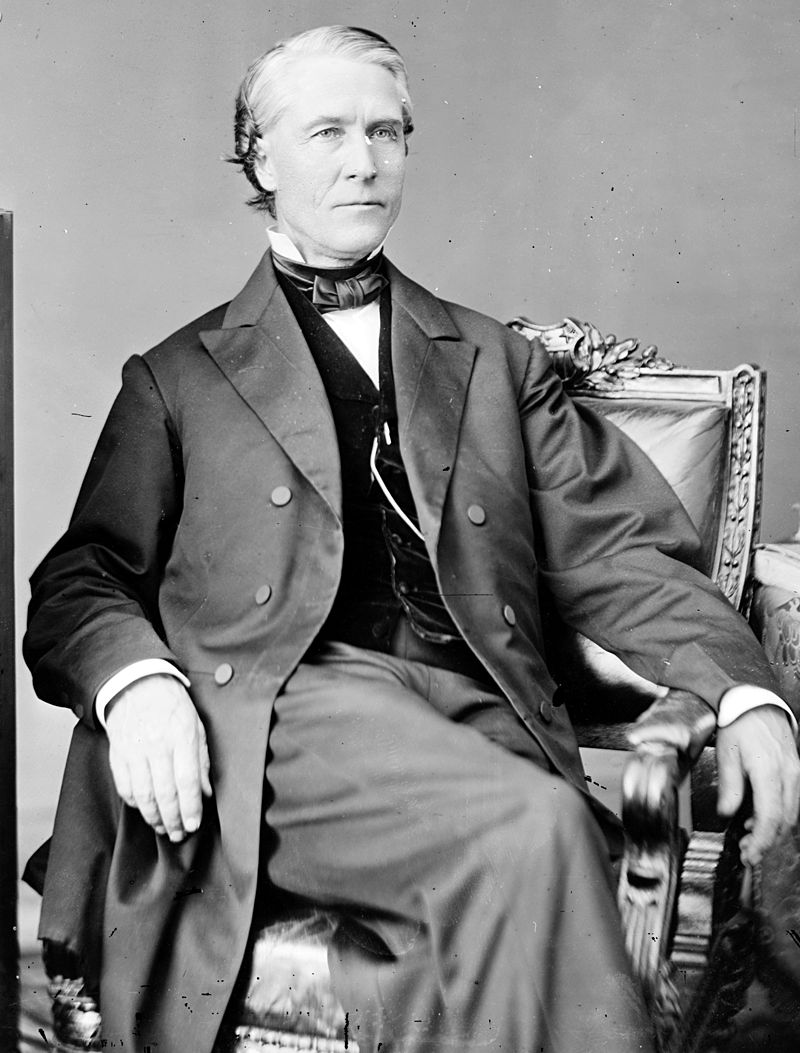

Member of the U.S. House of Representatives from Georgia's 6th district
- In office January 16, 1871 – March 4, 1873
- Preceded by: vacant
- Succeeded by: James Henderson Blount

Member of the Georgia Senate
- In office 1880-1881

Member of the Georgia House of Representatives
- In office 1868-1870; 1877-1879

Member of the South Carolina House of Representatives
- In office 1864-1866

Personal details
- Born: January 29, 1835 Dahlonega, Georgia, US
- Died: November 4, 1908 (aged 73) Dahlonega, Georgia, US
- Party: Democratic
- Education: Furman University
- Occupation: Lawyer

William Pierce Price (January 29, 1835 – November 4, 1908) was a politician who served in the United States House of Representatives. Price was born in Dahlonega, Georgia.

== Early life and education ==
Price was born to William Pierce Price Sr., and Sarah Denton Price (née Williams) in Dahlonega, Georgia. Price attended the common schools and was apprenticed to the printer's trade. In 1851, he moved to Greenville, South Carolina, around the age of 16. Eventually he attended Furman University, Greenville, South Carolina, but left before graduating to take charge of the editorial department of the Southern Enterprise, a Greenville newspaper. While in school he had studied law. He was admitted to the bar in 1856 and commenced practice in Greenville, South Carolina around the age of 20.

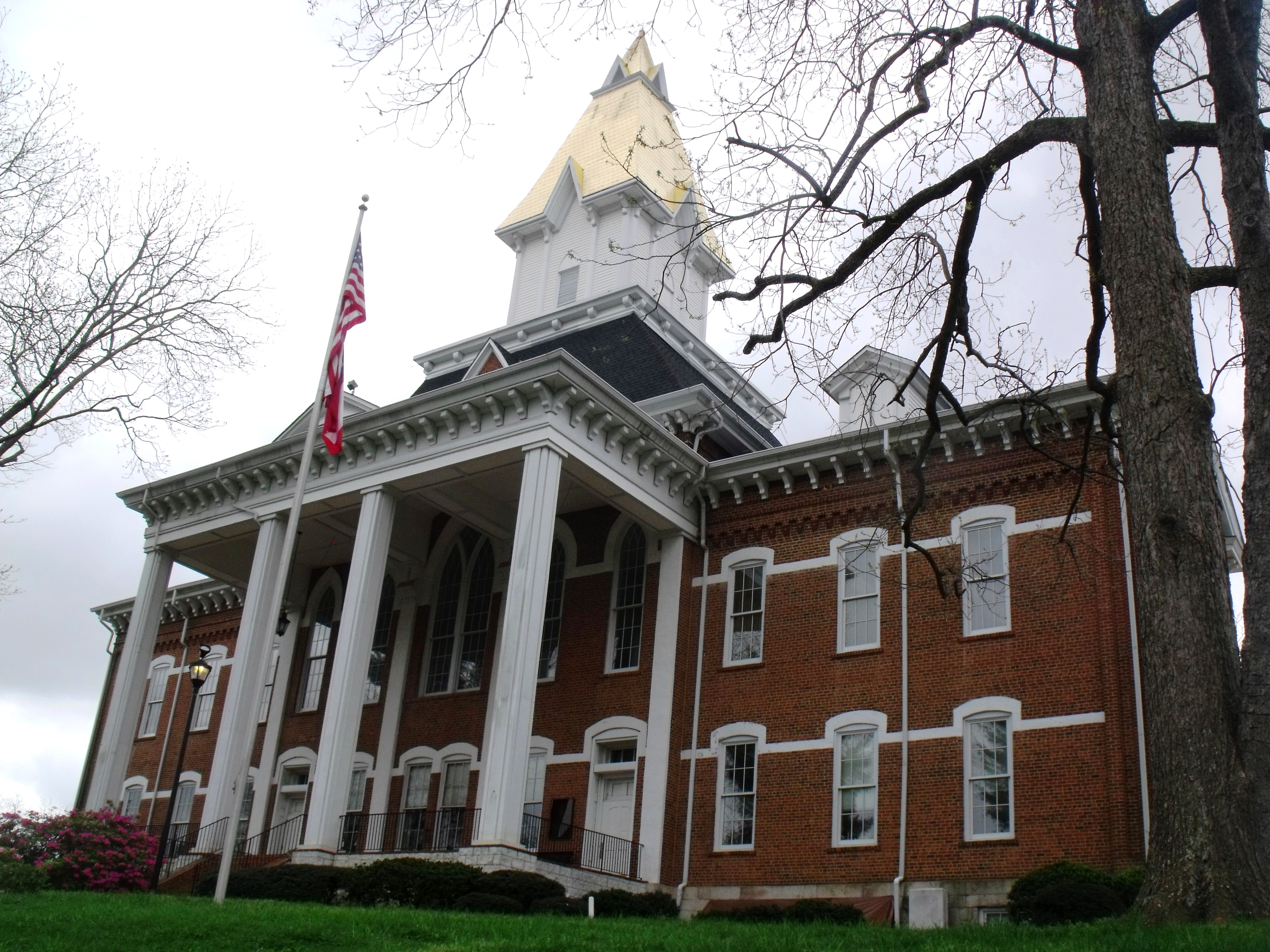
Built in 1879, Price Memorial Hall is the oldest building on the campus of the University of North Georgia.

== Political career ==
During the Civil War Price served in the Confederate States Army as orderly sergeant in Kershaw's Second South Carolina Regiment. He was elected and served as member of the South Carolina House of Representatives 1864–1866. In 1866, he moved back to his birthplace of Dahlonega, Georgia. Two years later in 1868 he served as member of the Georgia House of Representatives until 1870.

His next appointment as a Democrat to the Forty-first Congress on January 16, 1871, to fill the vacancy caused by failure to elect. He was reelected to the Forty-second Congress and served from March 4, 1871, to March 4, 1873. He was not a candidate for renomination in 1872. He was again a member of the State house of representatives 1877–1879, of the State senate in 1880 and 1881, and of the State house of representatives in 1894 and 1895. He served as delegate to the Democratic National Convention in 1880.

== Other work ==
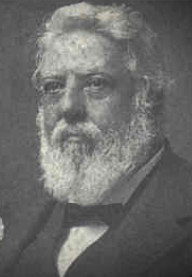
An old William P. Price

After serving in politics he resumed the practice of law. He was instrumental in the establishment of what was then North Georgia Agricultural College, now called the University of North Georgia, of which he served as president of the board of trustees from 1870 until his death in 1908. He died on November 4, 1908, in Dahlonega and is interred in Mt. Hope Cemetery. The iconic Price Memorial Hall with its gold tipped spear is named in his honor. charter member of Sigma Alpha Epsilon, Georgia Delta chapter, North Georgia Agricultural College, Dahlonega, GA Sept. 29th 1879.

In 1879, a fire destroyed the Dahlonega Gold Mint, which was being used by the North Georgia Agricultural College at the time. Shortly thereafter, Price Memorial Hall was built in its place. Today Price Memorial Hall is the oldest surviving structure to be found on the UNG campus.

== Family ==
Price married Martha A. Matilda Martin (1837–1907), daughter of William Martin, a Confederate soldier. He had ten children. Four died in infancy. The oldest surviving child, Caroline Price (1860–1936), was a concert musician before marriage to Walter S. Wilson and children ended her career. The next, Isabella Sterling Price (1864–1931), was considered an excellent actress but as that career was "out of bounds for young girls" at that time, she married William Arthur Charters. Beveline Arcadia Price (1867–1942) married David Sloan Craig. The marriage broke up and she returned to Dahlonega, Georgia, to look after her parents. Sarah Wansley Price (1869-194?) enjoyed art, but gave this up for marriage to John Calhoun West. She also taught domestic science at North Georgia College. William Prescott Price (1873–1945) was a businessman. Frederick Singleton Lucas Price (1878–1931) served in the military from 1898 until his death. He served in the Philippines, China, and the Mexican Expedition. He was promoted to colonel in 1921 and was on the General Staff Corps Eligible List at his death.

U.S. House of Representatives
Preceded by American Civil War	Member of the U.S. House of Representatives from Georgia's 6th congressional district December 22, 1870 – March 3, 1873	Succeeded by James H. Blount
