= Merritt Eldred Hoag =

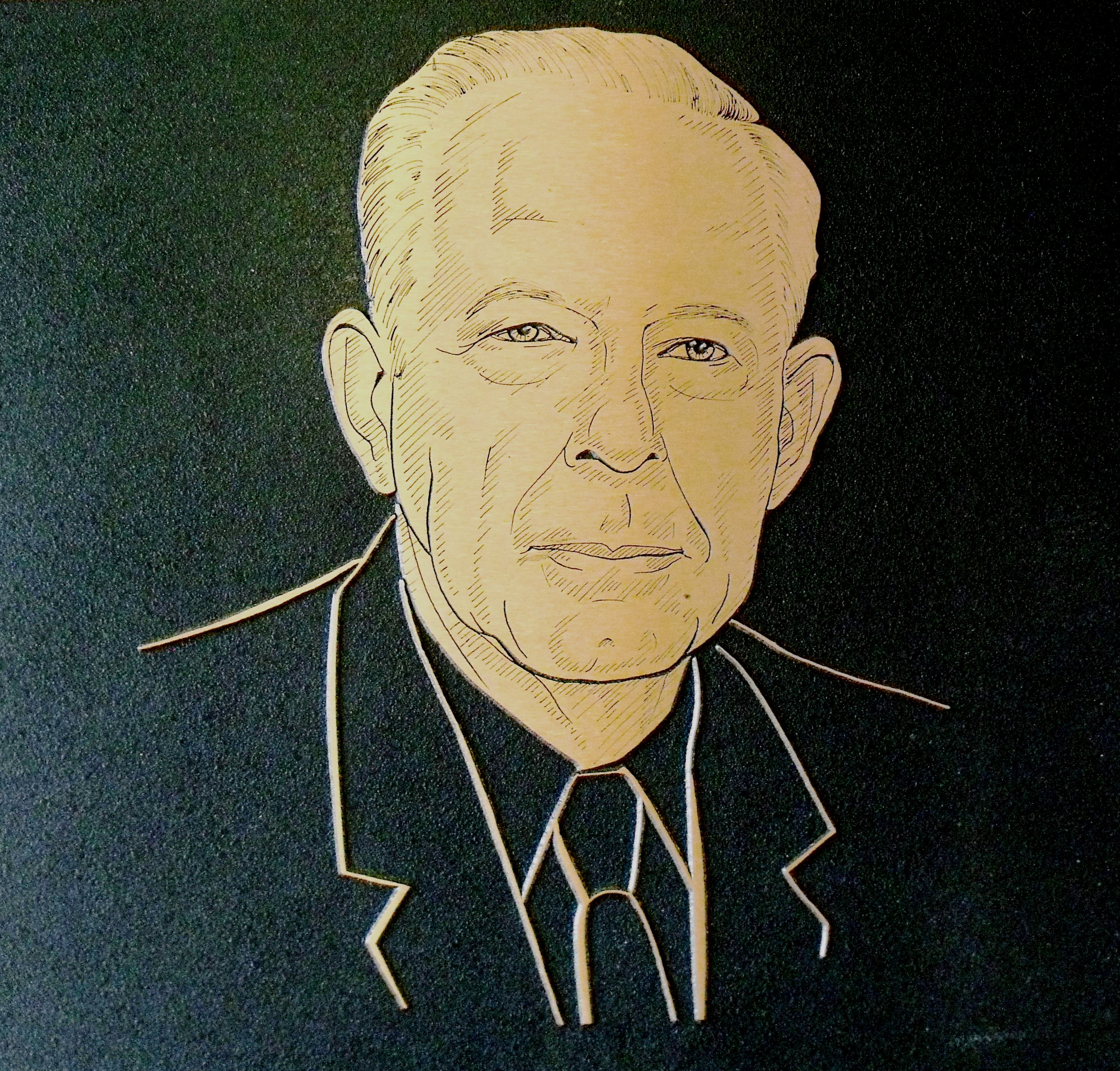
- Commemorative plaque of Merritt Eldred Hoag

11th President of the University of North Georgia
- In office 1949–1970
- Preceded by: Jonathan Clark Rogers
- Succeeded by: John H. Owen

Personal details
- Born: 25 May 1909
- Died: 19 November 1994 (age 85) Young Harris, Georgia
- Spouse: Faye Clegg Hoag
- Children: John Randall Hoag
- Education: Edinboro University of Pennsylvania; Duke University

Merritt Eldred Hoag (May 25, 1909 – November 19, 1994) was a lieutenant commander in the U.S. Navy during World War II as well as the 11th president of North Georgia College (now known as the University of North Georgia).

== Early life ==
Hoag grew up and attended grade school in Pennsylvania. Following high school he enrolled in Edinboro College and subsequently Duke University, where he earned a master's degree in economics and English. He then had a brief career as a principal, and later a dean, of masonic school in Texas.

Hoag joined the United States Navy at the beginning of the Second World War. He spent the early years of the war organizing pre-flight schools at the University of Georgia, the University of North Carolina, and the University of Iowa. A few years into the war he requested sea duty. By the end of the 1940s Hoag had been involved in six Pacific invasions and had achieved the rank of lieutenant commander. For his wartime service Hoag was awarded the Purple Heart, Asiatic-Pacific Campaign Medal, Philippine Independence Medal, and Victory Medal. After the war he remained in the United States Army Reserve until reaching the rank of lieutenant colonel, at which point he retired.

== Service in education ==
Before becoming the president of North Georgia College, Merritt E. Hoag served as the dean of the school during the presidency of Jonathan C. Rogers. After Rogers' retirement in 1949, Hoag succeeded him in the presidency.

== Late life and death ==
Following his retirement from the presidency at NGC, Hoag he became the mayor of Young Harris, Georgia- a position that he held for two consecutive terms. Hoag died in Young Harris on November 19, 1994.
