= Gainesville State College =

Former college in Georgia, U.S.

- Former names: Gainesville State College; Gainesville College; Gainesville Junior College
- Motto: "Student Focused, Learning Centered"
- Type: Public
- Active: 1964–2013
- Parent institution: University System of Georgia
- Endowment: $4 million
- President: Randy Pierce
- Students: 8,968
- Location: Oakwood, Georgia, U.S. 34°14′5.33″N 83°52′1.86″W
- Campus: Suburban
- Colors: Green and white
- Nickname: Fighting Geese
- Mascot: Laker the Goose
- Website: www.gsc.edu

Gainesville State College was a state college of the University System of Georgia serving northeast Georgia. The Gainesville State College Gainesville Campus, located 45 miles (72 km) northeast of Atlanta and six miles (9.7 km) southwest of downtown Gainesville in Oakwood, was on Georgia State Route 53 less than a mile from I-985 exit 16. The Gainesville State College Oconee Campus was located on Bishop Farms Parkway in Watkinsville, Georgia. Students were drawn primarily from the increasingly diverse northeast Georgia area.

On January 10, 2012, the Board of Regents of the University System of Georgia approved the merger of the school with North Georgia College and State University, which took effect in January 2013. The new combined school is called the University of North Georgia.

== History ==
The school was established on March 11, 1964, as a community college named Gainesville Junior College. Classes were first held in the fall of 1966, with an enrollment of 419 students, and the school utilized facilities at the Gainesville Civic Center and First Baptist Church of Gainesville. The school moved into its own dedicated facilities beginning in the winter of 1967. The initial enrollment was approximately double what had been projected, and the school continued to enroll more students than had been projected by long-range studies, necessitating a tripling of educational facilities during the college's early years.

In 1987, the school's name was changed to Gainesville College.

In the fall of 2000, the Georgia Board of Regents granted then-Gainesville College permission to establish the Gainesville College University Center on the Gainesville campus. The University Center enabled the college to form partnerships with other baccalaureate degree granting institutions to provide coursework leading to the bachelor's degree on the Gainesville campus. In October 2005, the Board of Regents voted to expand the school's mission and change its name to Gainesville State College. The school was reclassified as a four-year state college, which allowed it to begin offering a limited selection of baccalaureate degrees. The first four-year degree offered by the school was a Bachelor of Science in Applied Environmental Spatial Analysis, and the selection of four-year degrees offered has expanded through the years.

In the spring of 2001, the school was granted permission to open a second campus in Athens, Georgia. This site was opened in the fall of 2001 and was relocated in 2003 to a nearby site in Watkinsville, Oconee County, Georgia. The Oconee campus was expanded in 2009 with the addition of an 11,000 square foot multipurpose Faculty Center.

Enrollment growth in later years (to 8,800 students in 2009, with 6,597 enrolled at the Gainesville campus) resulted in the construction and renovation of several buildings, bringing the total number of buildings at the Gainesville campus to thirteen. The most recent major addition was a building devoted to science, engineering, and technology.

== Academics ==
With an enrollment which exceeded 8,000 in 2011, Gainesville State College offered courses leading to the Bachelor of Science in Applied Environmental Spatial Analysis (IESA - Institute for Environmental and Spatial Analysis), Bachelor of Science with a major in early childhood care and education, Bachelor of Applied Science with a major in technology management, Associate of Arts, Associate of Science, and Associate of Applied Science degrees, in addition to certificate programs in Information Technology, Geographic Information Systems and Personal Fitness Training. Ninety percent of Gainesville State College students were in programs transferable to four-year colleges and universities. North Georgia College and State University offered courses on the Gainesville campus through the college's University Center.

== Student life ==
Gainesville State College students could participate in student activities such as intramurals, clubs and organizations, bands, chorus, publications, cultural affairs programs, fine arts offerings, extended orientation, and international-intercultural studies programs. To promote student involvement in extra-curricular activities, the college offered co-curricular transcripts for use in job and academic applications.

The Gainesville State College Foundation generated and administered private financial support for the college, primarily for student scholarships, faculty and staff development, and outreach activities of the college. Graduates of the college could join the Gainesville State College Alumni Association. The college Continuing Education Department supports professional and vocational interests of area citizens and reflects a lifelong learning philosophy of the institution.

Gainesville State College, in partnership with Brenau University, was a member of the Gainesville Theatre Alliance (GTA) which produced three to four plays or musicals each year.

Items such as notebooks and sweatshirts in the GSC bookstore were branded with "Home of the Fighting Geese" and Laker T. Goose mascots. Those images were intended only to inspire school spirit, as GSC did not field intercollegiate or extramural athletic teams.

== Faculty ==
From 2008 data, GSC faculty included 87 holders of doctorates (46.3%), 3 holders of professional degrees (1.6%), 92 holders of master's degrees (48.9%), and 6 holders of bachelor's degrees (3.2%). According to the latest data available from 2006, GSC had 140 full-time faculty, 133 part-time faculty, and 66 faculty members classified as "Other".

In 2008, 97 faculty members were male (51.6%) and 91 were female (48.4%). Under racial classifications, 12 faculty members were classified as "Black" (6.4%), 149 faculty members were classified as "White" (79.3%), and 27 faculty members were classified as "Other" (14.4%).

Despite the uniformity of tuition among seven of the University System of Georgia's eight state colleges, Gainesville State College's faculty pay ranked at the bottom for associate professors ($55,323 USG vs. $48,161 GSC - 12.9% lower), assistant professors ($46,818 USG vs. $39,524 GSC - 15.6% lower), and instructors ($39,160 USG vs. $35,342 GSC - 9.7% lower). While full professors at GSC were not the lowest paid out of all of the state colleges, they were still paid 10.3% below the state college average.

In 2008, faculty members by rank included 34 full professors (18.1%), 38 associate professors (20.2%), 85 assistant professors (45.2%), and 31 instructors (16.5%). That same year, 74 faculty were tenured (39.4%), 91 were tenure track (48.4%), 9 were non-tenure track (4.8%), and 14 were not on tenure track (7.4%). The data gives no indication on the precise difference between "non-tenure track" and "not on tenure track".
