= Jonathan Clark Rogers =

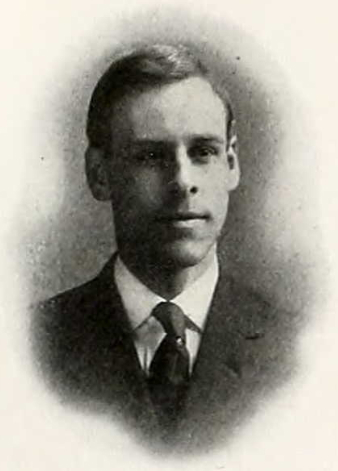
- Jonathan Clark Rogers in 1909

President of the University of Georgia
- In office 1949–1950
- Preceded by: Harmon White Caldwell
- Succeeded by: Omer Clyde Aderhold

President of the University of North Georgia
- Preceded by: Frank G. Branch
- Succeeded by: Merritt Eldred Hoag

Personal details
- Born: September 7, 1885 Richmond, Indiana
- Died: October 24, 1967 (aged 82) Gainesville, Georgia
- Education: Piedmont College, Earlham College, Columbia University

Jonathan Clark Rogers (September 7, 1885 – October 24, 1967) was President of the University of Georgia (UGA) in Athens from 1949 until 1950.

== Early life ==
Born in 1885 in Richmond, Indiana, Rogers earned his B.S. at Piedmont College in 1906 and his civil engineering degree (B.S.C.E) from Earlham College the following year. He also earned an M.A. from Columbia University in 1927. In 1934 he received an honorary EdD degree from Piedmont College.

== Service in education ==
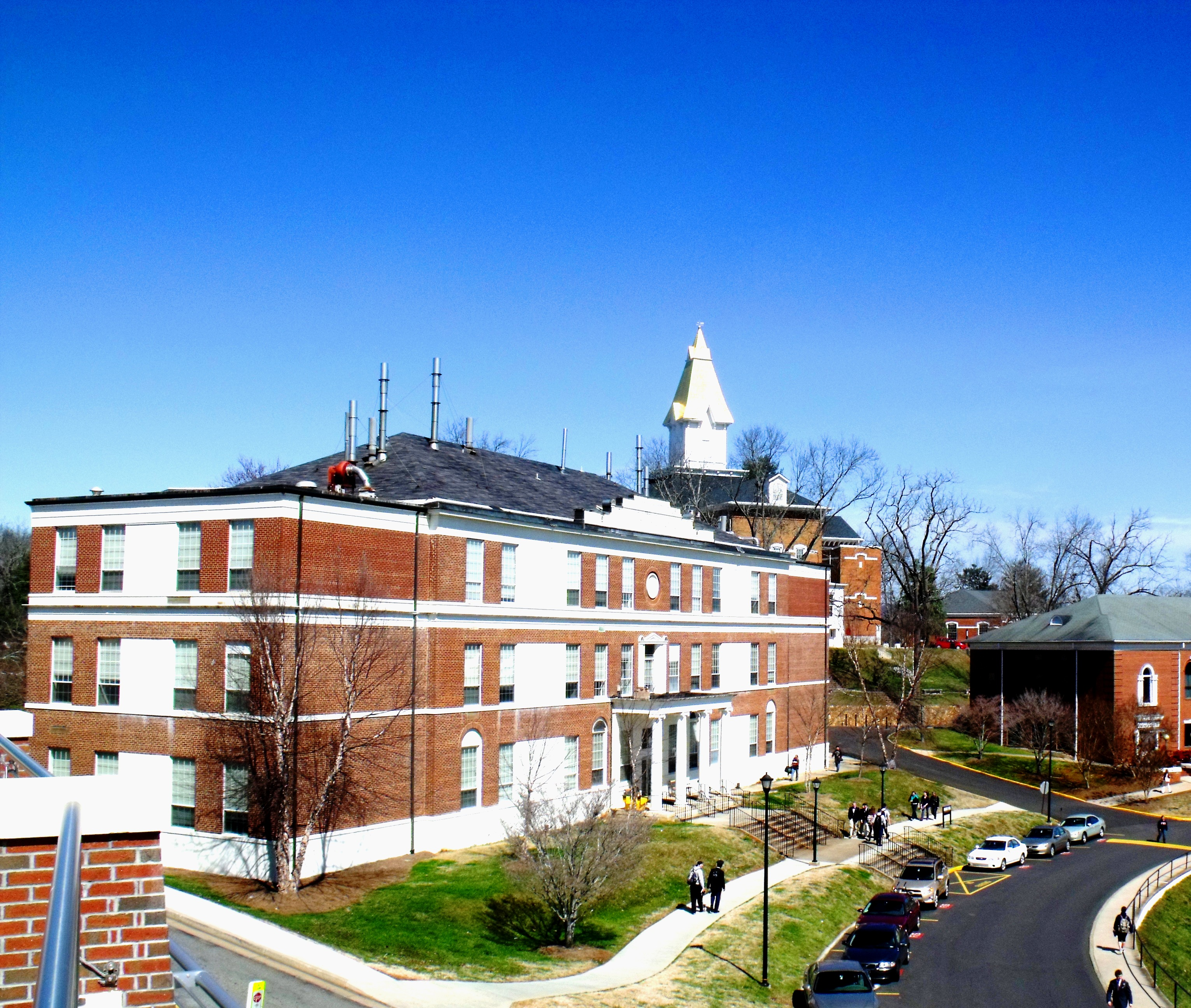
Rogers Hall was opened in 1946 for the use of NGC's science department.

Rogers taught at Oakwood Seminary in Union Springs, New York until 1911 when he joined Piedmont College. There he taught and served as Dean until 1934 when he became President of North Georgia College in Dahlonega. Rogers assumed the presidency at NGC shortly after it was reduced to a junior college in 1933. During his presidency, enrollment at North Georgia rose from 160 to 702, thus making it the largest junior college in Georgia at the time. In January 1949 he was selected as the President of UGA.

Rogers' tenure at UGA was very brief due to a power struggle with some members of the Georgia Board of Regents over whether the College of Agriculture should remain a part of the university or become its own institution. UGA kept the school; however, the clash cost Rogers his job. After leaving the university in 1950, Rogers directed Tallulah Falls School (1951–1953) and worked at Reinhardt College as a math professor and counselor from 1957 to 1962.

On October 24, 1967, Rogers died in Gainesville, Georgia and was buried in Demorest, Georgia.

== Sources ==
- From Ahmedunggar to Lavonia Presidents at the University of Georgia 1785-1997, University of Georgia Libraries, Hargrett Rare Book and Manuscript Library Archived 2006-08-31 at the Wayback Machine
- 'Brief yet Important' era of UGA president honored, Sarah Lee, Athens Banner Herald, 10/03/2001

Preceded by Harmon White Caldwell	President of the University of Georgia; 1949 – 1950	Succeeded by Omer Clyde Aderhold
Preceded by Frank G. Branch	President of North Georgia College; 1933 – 1949	Succeeded by Merritt E. Hoag
