= University of North Georgia =

Public university in Georgia, United States

- Former name: List: North Georgia Agricultural College of University of Georgia (1873-1876); North Georgia Agricultural College (1876-1929); North Georgia College (1929-1996); North Georgia College & State University (1996-2013); Gainesville Junior College (1964-1987); Gainesville College (1987-2005); Gainesville State College (2005-2013)
- Motto: "Truth and Wisdom"
- Type: Public senior military university
- Established: 1873; 153 years ago
- Parent institution: University System of Georgia
- Accreditation: SACS
- Academic affiliations: Space-grant
- Endowment: $100.4 million (2025)
- President: Michael P. Shannon
- Provost: Chaudron Gille
- Students: 19,722 (fall 2018)
- Undergraduates: 19,041 (fall 2018)
- Postgraduates: 681 (fall 2018)
- Location: Dahlonega, Georgia, United States; 34°31′40″N 83°59′01″W
- Campus: 212 acres (0.86 km^{2}) (Dahlonega campus); 794 acres (3.21 km^{2}) (all campuses); Distant town
- Other campuses: Blue Ridge; Cumming; Oakwood; Watkinsville
- Newspaper: Vanguard
- Colors: Blue and gold
- Nickname: Nighthawks
- Sporting affiliations: NCAA Division II – PBC; SoCon
- Website: ung.edu
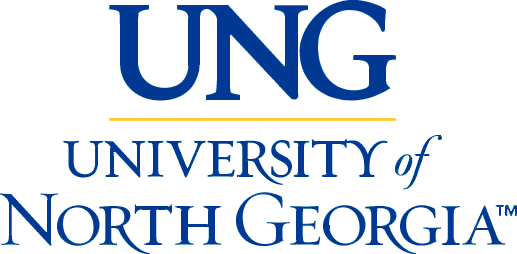

The University of North Georgia (UNG) is a public university with multiple campuses in Georgia, United States. It is part of the University System of Georgia. The university was established on January 8, 2013, through a merger of North Georgia College & State University (founded 1873) and Gainesville State College (founded 1964). Campus locations include Dahlonega, Oakwood (Gainesville Campus), Watkinsville (Oconee Campus), Blue Ridge, and Cumming.

With nearly 20,000 enrolled students, UNG is the sixth-largest public university in the state of Georgia. There are five colleges that offer over one hundred bachelor's and associate degrees, as well as thirteen master's degrees and one doctoral degree. Over 600 students are involved in the university's ROTC program in any given year. It is one of six senior military colleges in the United States, and is designated as "The Military College of Georgia".

== History ==
North Georgia College and State University began in 1873 as North Georgia Agricultural College. It was originally an offsite branch of the University of Georgia's College of Agriculture and Mechanical and was created with funds from the Morrill Act. William Pierce Price, a local congressman, persuaded officials at UGA to use part of the funds to establish a branch of the newly created college in Dahlonega, Price's birthplace and home. The college opened classes in 1873 with 177 students, 98 males, and 79 females, making it the first coeducational college in the state. Classes were originally held in the old U.S. Mint building that was shut down during the Civil War. After the college was awarded the power to grant degrees in 1876, the first graduating class received degrees in 1879. The first graduating class of four consisted of three men and one woman, making North Georgia the first public institution in the state to award a degree to a female.

The college had always had a military presence since land-grant schools were required to teach military tactics, but it was not until World War I that the military programs began to grow. The National Defense Act of 1916 that created the ROTC also helped establish the military presence that is felt on the campus today. In 1929 the designation of Agricultural was dropped from the name and the school became North Georgia College. By 1932 the college was reduced to a two-year junior college. World War II saw a decline in enrollment because of the number of male students joining the war effort. This changed when an Army Specialized Training Program was placed at the college to train junior officers. After the war, the college grew because of young servicemen and veterans using their GI bill benefits to attend school. By 1946 the college was reinstated as a four-year college. In the 1950s, Dahlonega provided gold for the leafing of the capitol building. It was also at this time that similar efforts to gold leaf Price Memorial Hall were begun, a project that did not see fruition until 1973. It was granted university status in 1996.

Meanwhile, Gainesville Junior College was founded in Oakwood, Georgia in 1964 and began holding classes in 1966. The school originally was a two-year college and for many years had an open-access mission, meaning that it accepted all applicants who held a high school diploma. Over time, the school expanded, opening branch campuses in Watkinsville, Georgia, and Cumming, Georgia (which was a joint venture with North Georgia College and State University called University Center 400 that opened in August 2012 and then renamed to Cumming Campus in January 2013 at consolidation), and changing its name to Gainesville College and then Gainesville State College. Before consolidation with the North Georgia College and State University, the school had already begun to shift towards allowing four-year baccalaureate programs.

On January 10, 2012, the University System of Georgia approved the consolidation of North Georgia College and State University and Gainesville State College to form a new institution, the University of North Georgia in January 2013.

The university president is Michael P. Shannon.

== Campuses ==
The University of North Georgia has campuses located in Dahlonega, Oakwood (Gainesville), Watkinsville (Oconee), Cumming, and Blue Ridge. Collectively, there are 794 acres (321 ha) of land among the Dahlonega, Oakwood, and Watkinsville campuses.

=== Dahlonega campus ===
UNG's Dahlonega campus is the former site of North Georgia College & State University. It was not until 1879 that the oldest surviving structure, Price Memorial Hall, was constructed upon the former site of the Dahlonega Mint. Today the gold-leafed steeple of the Price Memorial Hall building remains one of the most striking features of the UNG skyline. Much of the campus has been developed around the William J. Livsey Drill Field, more commonly known as simply "the Drill Field". Dahlonega is located approximately an hour's drive from downtown Atlanta (66 miles (106 km) away), an hour and a half drive from downtown Athens (60 miles (97 km) away), a two-hour and fifteen-minute drive from Chattanooga, Tennessee (109 miles (175 km) away), and an approximately two hour and twenty-minute drive from Greenville, South Carolina (127 miles (204 km) away).

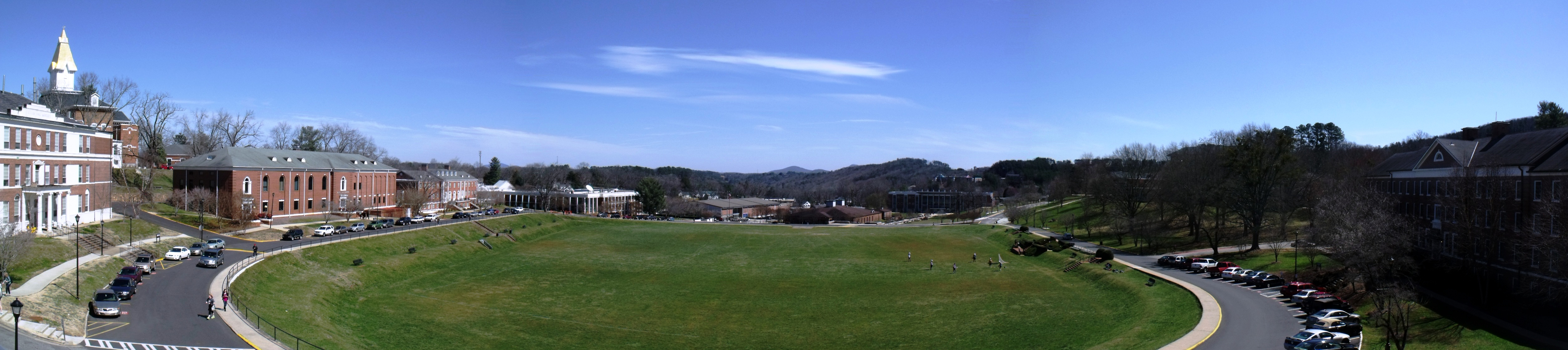
A panoramic view of UNG's Dahlonega Campus, showing Rogers Hall, Price Memorial Hall, Nix Fine Arts Center, Barnes Hall, Dunlap Hall, the General William J. "Lipp" Livsey Drill Field, the UNG Library/Technology Center, and Lewis Residence Hall.

=== Gainesville campus ===
Until it was consolidated with North Georgia College & State University in 2013, UNG's Gainesville campus was the location of Gainesville State College. Now known as the "Gainesville campus, "it is located within the city limits of Oakwood. It has retained its named association with "Gainesville," since the school was founded in and located near that major city. The Gainesville campus has no on-campus dormitories, however, new housing opportunities are adjacent to the campus in the form of student friendly apartments and town-homes.

The oldest degree on the Gainesville campus is the Environmental Spatial Analysis (B.S.) degree in the Institute for Environmental & Spatial Analysis.

=== Cumming campus ===
In 2012, an academic facility in Cumming, GA was opened on GA 400. The goal of the Cumming campus is to provide access to higher education to the local residents and to an area of the state that was previously "underserved." The campus offers classes and programs for dual enrollment students, associate students, bachelor students, and graduate students

=== Oconee campus ===
The campus was established in 2003, originally as a part of Gainesville State College. Oconee is a non-residential campus primarily serving students in the Athens and Watkinsville area. The campus is easily accessible from US-441 and the University of North Georgia has recently announced plans to expand the campus to accommodate the growing class sizes.

=== Blue Ridge campus ===
On August 13, 2015, UNG opened a new campus in Blue Ridge, GA. The purpose of the Blue Ridge Campus is to offer dual-enrollment options for high school students, classes for first-time freshmen, classes for adult learners, and continuing and professional education programs. The students on this campus can also take classes via eCore, an online platform through which they can complete the first two years of their degree.

== Academics ==
Academic rankings

Regional
- U.S. News & World Report: 40

National
- Forbes: 505

The University of North Georgia is a public co-educational institution that operates on a semester-term schedule.

=== University of North Georgia honors program ===
Distinctive to UNG's program, 40% of the students in the program study abroad before graduation, 80% graduate in four years, and 95% graduate within five years. The Honors Program at UNG emphasizes leadership and requires students to serve in leadership positions within the Honors Program and/or other campus organizations. UNG is a member of the Georgia Collegiate Honors Council, the Southern Regional Honors Council, and the National Collegiate Honors Council.

=== DETI ===
The University of North Georgia's Distance Education & Technology Integration (DETI) program is operated by sixteen staff members in the Administration, Student Success, Instructional Design, and Technology Integration departments. These are joined by the numerous professors who teach the classes. These members of the faculty and staff are located in the Library & Technology Center on the Dahlonega campus, as well as the Blue Ridge, Gainesville, and Oconee campuses.

=== Degrees ===
For undergraduates, the University of North Georgia offers 129 associate and baccalaureate degrees, as well as pre-professional and certificate programs. For graduates, the university offers thirteen-degree programs as well as one doctoral program. As a state-designated leadership institution, UNG is the only university in Georgia to offer a minor in leadership. The school is also a flagship ROTC Center in Chinese. This designation is aimed at helping cadets become proficient in Chinese language and culture. However, due mostly to size, each campus varies significantly in terms of which degree curricula they can accommodate. The Dahlonega campus focuses on Baccalaureate and graduate programs and is the only one of the four campuses that offer Pre-Professional Programs. A smaller number of baccalaureate programs, most of which are education or business-related, are available at the Gainesville Campus, while associate degrees are offered at both the Gainesville and Oconee campuses. As of Fall 2014, the Gainesville campus is now offering a bachelor's degree in Communication and offering three concentrations in Film and Digital Media, Multimedia Journalism, and Organizational Leadership.

=== Professional and continuing education ===
Some of the programs provided include leadership development, photography classes, computer training, English and foreign language classes, travel, and industry certifications. These courses are designed to help people and businesses with job growth as well as recruitment. Courses can be taken at any University of North Georgia campus for an assorted fee. UNG also provides thousands of online professional and continuing education classes if you are unable to take classes on campus. UNG also provides space for events such as corporate events, meetings, conferences or camps. Accommodations for events include conference rooms, auditoriums, classrooms, dining, wireless internet, and parking. By contacting the professional and continuing education department any business can hold an event at UNG as well as outside camps. Camps provided by the university include academic and athletic camps for kids and students. On the Gainesville and Dahlonega campuses, anyone who is not a student at the university is able to pay a fee for a gym membership and use the recreational facilities located on those campuses.

== Student life ==
Undergraduate demographics as of Fall 2023
Race and ethnicity	Total
White	70%
Hispanic	17%
Black	4%
Two or more races	4%
Asian	3%
International student	1%
Unknown	1%
Economic diversity
Low-income (Note: The percentage of students who received an income-based federal Pell grant intended for low-income students.)	30%
Affluent (Note: The percentage of students who are a part of the American middle class at the bare minimum.)	70%

The University of North Georgia has 18,219 undergraduate students with a gender distribution of 44% male and 56% female. With 70% of students being full-time, Student life at UNG varies between campuses due to the differences in student housing accommodation of the two primary campuses in Dahlonega and Gainesville. Out of the 7,541 undergraduate students attending the Dahlonega campus, 36% live in college-owned housing. Unlike the Gainesville campus, which offers no student housing, the Dahlonega campus has a permanent residing student body of roughly 2,500 throughout most of the fall and spring semesters.

Approximately 32% of students at the Gainesville and Oconee campuses are from the counties in which the campus is located (Hall and Oconee counties). The Gainesville and Oconee campuses are located on the outskirts of the city of Gainesville and the city of Watkinsville, respectively. 29% of students at the Gainesville campus are part-time, 'non-traditional' (23 years of age or greater).

In addition to its official student-run multimedia news organization The Vanguard, the university operates a number of official social-media pages for sharing UNG news and content.

=== Student organizations ===
The University of North Georgia has several clubs and organizations on the Dahlonega, Gainesville, and Oconee campuses that students may join. Overall, there are more than 200 student organizations across the University of North Georgia campuses. Each campus has organizations for various interests, but there is currently no information available about student organizations on the Cumming campus. The University of North Georgia uses the website, OrgSync, to connect students with organizations.

=== Greek life ===
As of 2019, 5% of men undergraduate students and 10% of women undergraduate students are active members of fraternities and sororities. The three councils that govern the Greek community at the school are the Interfraternity Council (males), the Panhellenic Council (females), and the Unified Greek Council (gender inclusive). The school is home to nine national fraternities, seven national sororities, one national honor fraternity, and one local fraternity.

=== Dahlonega campus traditions ===
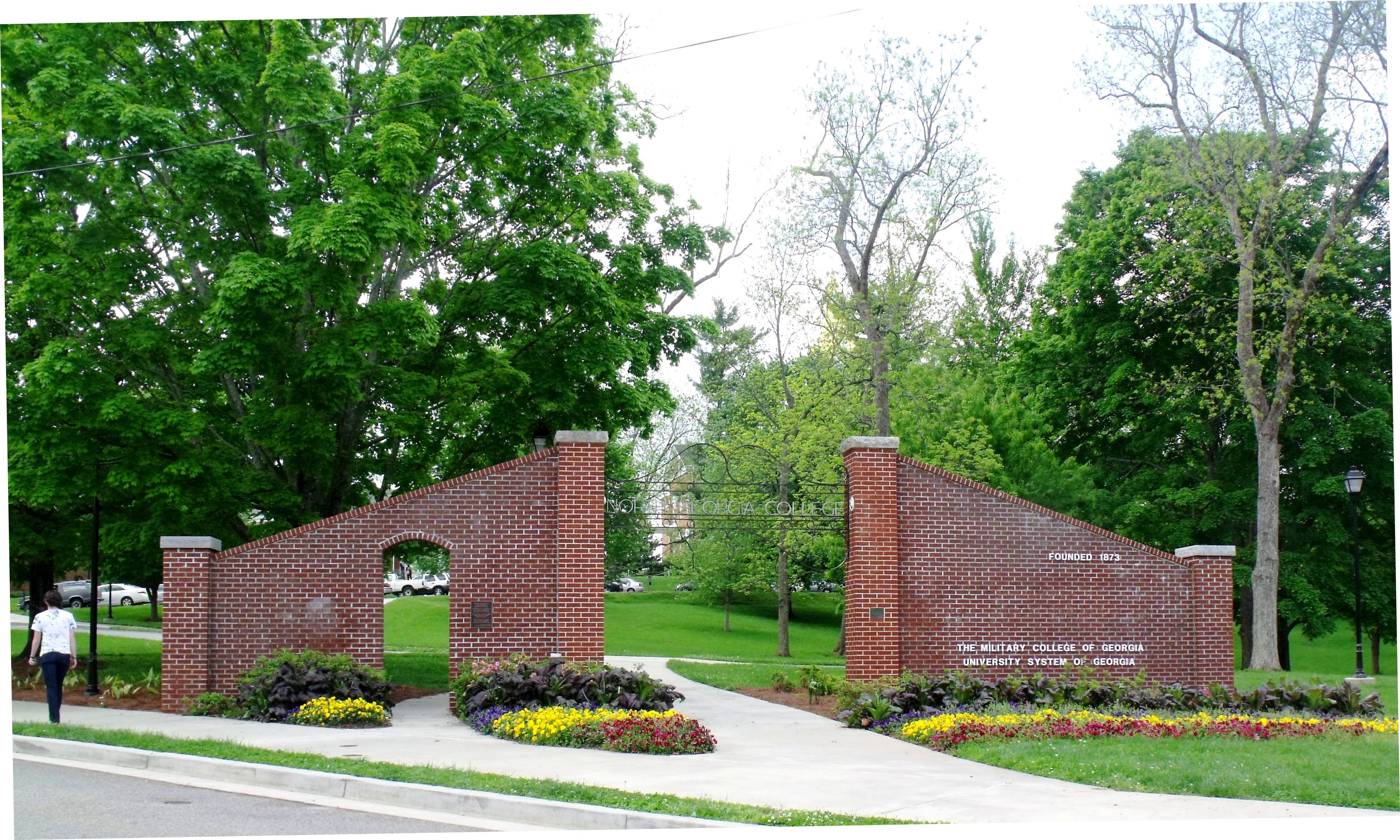
The North Georgia Arch

- Arch: The North Georgia Arch is located at the campus entrance near Dahlonega's town square. It was built by the Class of 1951 to commemorate their classmates who died in the Korean War. Tradition holds that freshmen are not to walk through the larger archway. Instead, they are supposed to walk through the smaller adjacent archway.

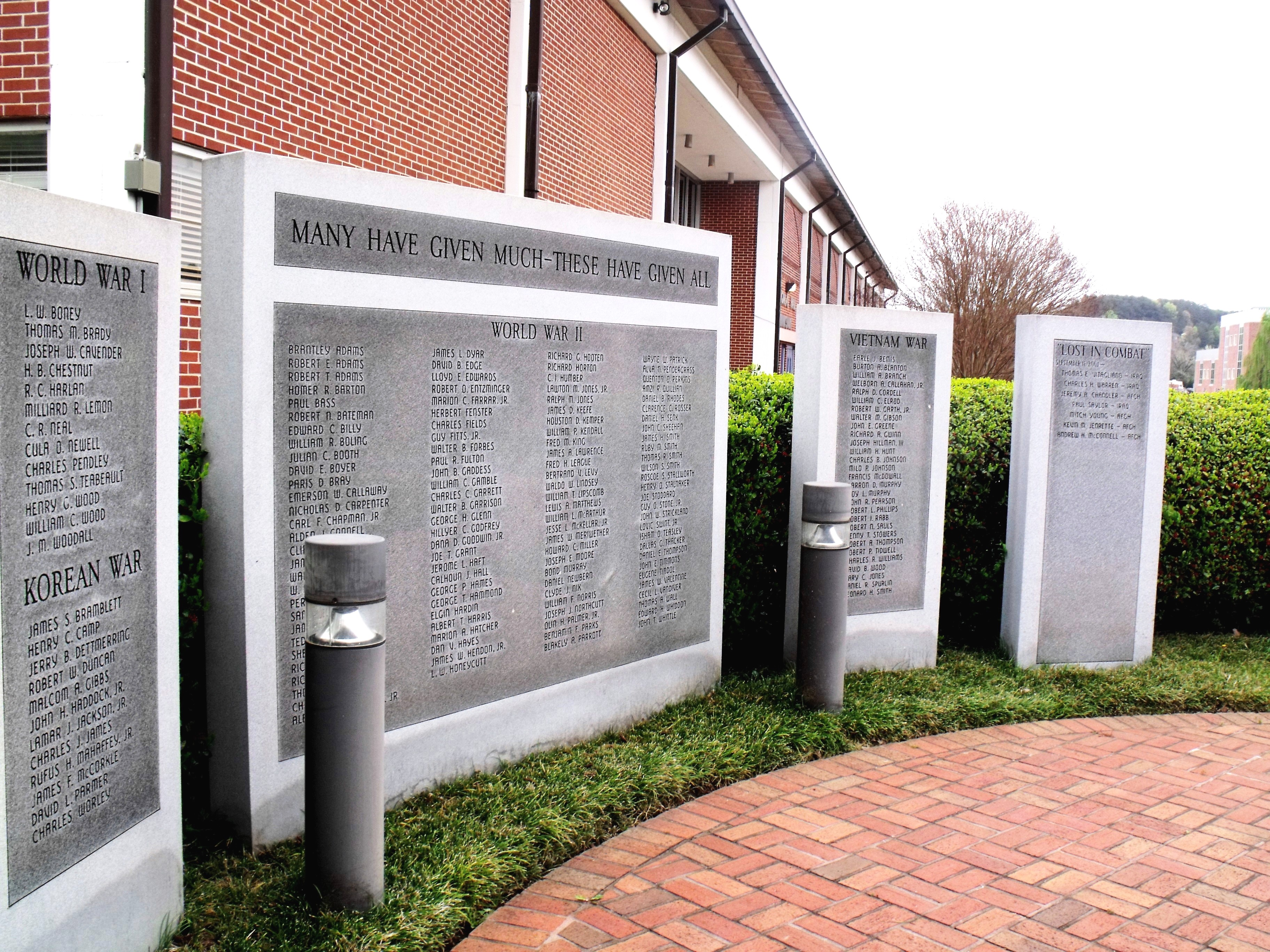
Memorial Wall

- Bugle Calls:
  - Reveille is played every morning at 6:30 a.m., at which time cadets and civilians alike stop and face the flag.
  - Retreat/To the Colors is played every afternoon at 5:00 p.m., at which time all outdoor activity on campus ceases, in order to pay respect to the American flag. Cadets stand at attention and salute the flag while civilians stop, remove their hats, face the flag, and place their right hand over their hearts. A cannon is also fired at this time.
  - Taps are played every evening at midnight to indicate the end of the day. Cadets are required to be in their dorms at this time except on open weekends.
- Drill Field: The Drill Field is located in the heart of the main campus. This field is the parade ground for the UNG Corps of Cadets and is used for drills and ceremonies. It is also used for recreational activities, such as intramural sports, though the activities of the Corps take precedence. Although the Drill Field is roughly 800 feet (240 m) long and located at the center of the campus, students are not supposed to walk across it as a shortcut. Instead, they are asked to walk around the encircling sidewalk when traveling from one building to another. On April 18, 2009, the drill field was dedicated to retired General William J. Livsey. There is a popular campus legend regarding a decommissioned World War II submarine buried at the center of the drill field, possibly inspired by the nearby Chestatee River Diving Bell.
- Memorial Wall: The wall, located in front of the Memorial Hall Gymnasium, was built in 1983 in honor of UNG students and alumni who died while in military service to their country. Students do not enter the area around the wall unless they are stopping to show honor to those listed on the wall. As of 2013, the memorial lists 174 names that died during WWI, WWII, the Korean War, the Vietnam War or were lost in combat.

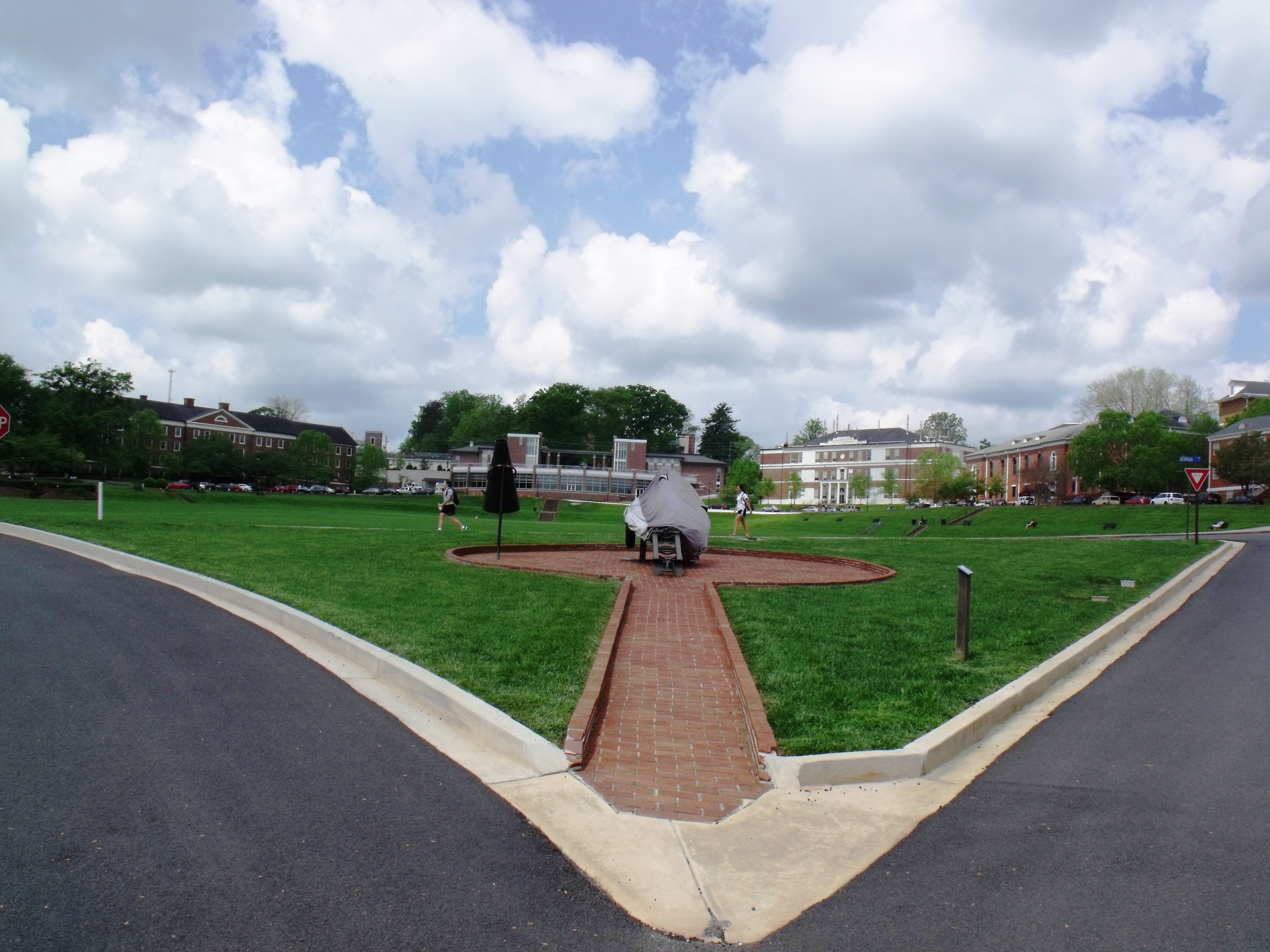
The UNG Retreat Triangle and the sheathed 75mm pack howitzer cannon

- Retreat Triangle: The triangle is located near the Drill Field, Student Center South, and Dunlap Hall. It holds the original retreat cannon, a 1902 three-inch (75 mm) pack howitzer, which has been fired daily at 5 p.m. for more than 50 years. The cannon has been restored by the North Georgia Parents Association. Students do not walk on the triangle or tamper with the cannon under any circumstances.

=== Center for Global Engagement ===
The Center for Global Engagement (CGE) is home to International Student and Scholar Services, Study Abroad Services, the Federal Service Language Academy, Military International Programs, International Internships, and International Partnerships.

- Study Abroad
- International Student and Scholar Services: The CGE assists international students, scholars, and faculty with transitioning from their home country to the United States. With help from the CGE, UNG hosts over 100 international students from more than 30 countries.
- Military international programs: The University of North Georgia (UNG) has partnered with US Army Cadet Command to send Cadets from schools throughout the United States to a foreign country. This led to the creation of the Cadet English Language Training Team (CELTT). Its purpose is to arrange the travel of cadets overseas to assist in teaching English to foreign military counterparts. The long-term goal of this program is to establish a service learning program that can be replicated in other regions and nations in each Unified Combatant Command Area of Responsibility.
- Federal Service Language Academy: The FSLA is a summer program for high school students who are interested in federal service careers and strategic foreign languages. Students may choose to take Arabic, Chinese (Mandarin), Russian, Korean, German, or Portuguese. Once on campus, students hear from speakers from agencies such as the DEA, FBI, State Department, and Peace Corps. After the three-week program, students may earn high school credit if approved by their high school.
- International partnerships: The Center for Global Engagement has established relationships with a growing number of outstanding universities worldwide. These relationships usually involve student and faculty exchanges, research opportunities, international internships, and other collaborative possibilities.
- International internships: International internships can offer an international experience combined with the real-world practice sought after by employers.

=== Housing ===
On campus The Dahlonega campus has six residence halls: Donovan Hall, Lewis Hall, Lewis Annex, North Georgia Suites, The Commons, and Owen Hall. Each residence hall has one of three housing styles. Traditional style housing entails single or double-occupancy bedrooms with community bathrooms on the hall. Suite-style housing entails single or double-occupancy bedrooms with a shared bathroom. Apartment-style housing entails single-occupancy bedrooms with a shared living room, kitchen, and bathrooms.

Donovan Hall (freshman only), Lewis Hall, and Lewis Annex are co-ed residence halls that have traditional style double-occupancy rooms. They are open only during the semesters. North Georgia Suites is a co-ed residence hall for freshmen and upperclassmen that has suite-style single and double-occupancy rooms. North Georgia Suites is open continuously from mid-August to May. The Commons is a co-ed residence hall for freshmen and upperclassmen that has suite-style single and double-occupancy rooms. The Commons is open from mid-August to May. Owen Hall is a co-ed residence hall for upperclassmen that has apartment style rooms. Owen Hall contains apartments with four single-occupancy bedrooms. Owen Hall is open from mid-August through July.

Off-Campus Students may live off-campus if they commute daily from the legal residence of parents or grandparents but it has to be within fifty miles of campus. Students can live off campus if they are married or divorced. Students are eligible to live off campus if they are 21 years of age or older, or if they have completed 60 credit hours. Students also have the option to live off campus if they have completed two years of active military service. Dahlonega campus has shuttles that run regularly to take students to places on campus.

== Reserve Officers' Training Corps (ROTC) ==
The U.S. Army ROTC program has been active on the Dahlonega campus since 1916, and began giving its graduates commissions in the Army or Army Reserve shortly after World War II, thanks to the G.I. Bill, the recent economic recovery in Georgia, and the leadership of college president Jonathan Clark Rogers. Today, it is one of six senior military colleges in the country. UNG is also designated by the Georgia Board of Regents and the Georgia General Assembly as the Military College of Georgia and as a leadership institution.

=== Blue Ridge Rifles ===
The Blue Ridge Rifles drill platoon unit was formed at North Georgia College in 1950 as the Honor Platoon, and took the name Blue Ridge Rifles in 1958 in homage to a Civil War unit that served in Dahlonega. In 1971, the Blue Ridge Rifles won first place in the East Tennessee State University Drill Meet. They were also the 2001 and 2002 national champion precision drill team.

=== Golden Eagle Band ===
Formed as a component of the Corps in 1873, the Golden Eagle Band is the university's sole marching band. Since UNG does not have a football team, the Golden Eagle Band does not perform at athletic events, unlike most other collegiate marching bands. Rather, the Golden Eagle Band's primary function is to perform at UNG Corps of Cadets functions, as well as to represent the Corps of Cadets in parades around the local community and throughout the nation. Every spring the band tours the Southeastern United States, entertaining audiences that come to see the military reviews and processions. Although the majority of the Golden Eagle Band's performances are military processions, the band has adopted Drum Corps International techniques into its own regimen. Unlike other military units at UNG, the Golden Eagle Band is open to both cadet and civilian students.

== Athletics ==
The North Georgia (UNG) athletic teams are known as the Nighthawks. They were known as the "Saints" until the 2013 expansion of the university. UNG is a member of the Division II level of the National Collegiate Athletic Association (NCAA), primarily competing in the Peach Belt Conference (PBC) since the 2005–06 academic year; while its rifle team competes in the Southern Conference (SoCon) in the NCAA Division I ranks. The Nighthawks previously competed in the Southern States Athletic Conference (SSAC; formerly known as Georgia–Alabama–Carolina Conference (GACC) until after the 2003–04 school year) of the National Association of Intercollegiate Athletics (NAIA) from 1999–2000 to 2004–05. All 13 intercollegiate programs are hosted on the university's Dahlonega campus.

UNG competes in 13 intercollegiate varsity sports: Men's sports include baseball, basketball, golf, soccer and tennis; while women's sports include basketball, cross country, golf, soccer, softball, tennis and track and field; and mixed sports include rifle.

=== Staff ===
Margaret Poitevint, Assistant Professor in the Department of Mathematics & Computer Science, is the NCAA-designated Faculty Athletics Representative.
