= 1929–30 Rugby Union County Championship =

37th edition of the County Championship

1929–30 County Championship
- Countries: England
- Champions: Gloucestershire (6th title)
- Runners-up: Lancashire

The 1929–30 Rugby Union County Championship was the 37th edition of England's premier rugby union club competition at the time.

Gloucestershire won the competition for the sixth time after defeating Lancashire in the final.

== Final ==
8 March 1930

Lancashire	7–13	Gloucestershire
Try: Tadman; Drop: Ogden		Try: Harris, Weaver, Daves G Con: Boughton (2)

St Anthony's Road, Blundellsands
Referee: J B Bott (London)

Joe Stewart	Preston Grasshoppers
B Butler	Fylde
E Ogden	Fylde
G Wilson	Birkenhead Park
J Tadman	Sale
Steve Meikle	Waterloo
John MacArthur	Waterloo
Joe Periton (capt)	Waterloo
Roy Foulds	Waterloo
J Scott	Waterloo
E Weld	Waterloo
S W Livesay	Manchester
E Henshaw	Liverpool
Harold Jones	Manchester
Henry Toft	Manchester University

Harold Boughton	Gloucester
Gwyn Davies	Cheltenham
Maurice McCanlis	Gloucester
Don Burland	Bristol
J James	Gloucester
C Carter	Bristol
George Davies	Cheltenham
Sam Tucker (capt)	Bristol
E Conley	Gloucester
W Wadley	Gloucester
Alfred Carpenter	Gloucester
J Davies	Gloucester
Leslie Saxby	Gloucester
S Weaver	Cinderford
N Harris	Cheltenham

== See also ==
- English rugby union system
- Rugby union in England
