= 1946–47 Rugby Union County Championship =

English rugby union competition

1946–47 County Championship
- Countries: England
- Champions: Lancashire (4th title)
- Runners-up: Gloucestershire

The 1946–47 Rugby Union County Championship was the 47th edition of England's premier rugby union club competition at the time.

Lancashire won the competition for the fourth time after defeating Gloucestershire in a replayed final.

== Semifinals ==
Team one	Team two	Score
Lancashire	Warwickshire	16-3
Gloucestershire	Middlesex	24-17

== Final ==
12 April 1947

Lancashire	8–8	Gloucestershire
Try: Rhodes, Guest; Con: Heaton		Drop: Jones (2)

St Anthony's Road, Blundellsands
Attendance: 5,000
Referee: Cyril H Gadney

J Bradburn	Wigan Old Boys
Dickie Guest	Waterloo
Jack Heaton (capt)	Waterloo
A C Shuker	Broughton Park
Cyril Holmes	Manchester
W B Cartnmell	Waterloo
Gordon Rimmer	Wigan Old Boys
R Logan	Sale
Alastair Fisher	Waterloo
A Goodings	Furness
Samuel Victor Perry	Waterloo
Eric Bole	Waterloo
John Cain	Waterloo
Humphrey Luya	Waterloo
P M Rhodes	Manchester

H Gribble	Stroud
G E Green	Bristol
S H Davies	Gloucester
H N Daniels	Gloucester
H W M Baker	Newport
W E Jones	Gloucester
E J Parfitt	Lydney
T Day	Gloucester
F C Hill	Bristol
George Gibbs	Bristol
Alun Meredith	Bristol
R R Morris (capt)	Gloucester
A G Hudson	Gloucester
S Betterton	Stroud
J Thornton	Gloucester

== Final replay ==
26 April 1947

Gloucestershire	3–14	Lancashire
Pen: Jones		Try: Shuker, Holmes, Luya; Con: Heaton; Pen: Heaton

Kingsholm Stadium, Gloucester
Attendance: 20,000
Referee: Cyril Gadney

H Gribble	Stroud
G E Green	Bristol
S H Davies	Gloucester
K N Daniell	Gloucester
H W M Baker	Newport
W E Jones	Gloucester
E J Parfitt	Lydney
T Day	Gloucester
F C Hill	Bristol
George Gibbs	Bristol
Alun Meredith	Bristol
R R Morris (capt)	Gloucester
A G Hudson	Gloucester
S Betterton	Stroud
J Thornton	Gloucester

J Bradburn	Wigan Old Boys
Dickie Guest	Waterloo
Jack Heaton (capt)	Waterloo
A C Shuker	Broughton Park
Cyril Holmes	Manchester
W B Cartnmell	Waterloo
Gordon Rimmer	Wigan Old Boys
R Logan	Sale
T N Reynolds	Fylde
Eric Evans	Sale
Samuel Victor Perry	Waterloo
Joe Mycock	Sale
John Cain	Waterloo
Humphrey Luya	Waterloo
P M Rhodes	Manchester

== See also ==
- English rugby union system
- Rugby union in England
