= 1948–49 Rugby Union County Championship =

English rugby union competition

1948–49 County Championship
- Countries: England
- Champions: Lancashire (6th title)
- Runners-up: Gloucestershire

The 1948–49 Rugby Union County Championship was the 49th edition of England's premier rugby union club competition at the time.

Lancashire won the competition for the sixth time and third in succession after defeating Gloucestershire in the final.

== Final ==
12 March 1949

Lancashire	9–3	Gloucestershire
Try: Guest, Moore, Bazley		Pen: Hook

St Anthony's Road, Blundellsands
Referee: H G Lathwell

T H Whitaker	Manchester University
Dickie Guest	Waterloo
W B Gornall	Waterloo
T R Beatson	Preston Grasshoppers
Reg Bazley	Liverpool University
S Plumb	Birkenhead Park
Gordon Rimmer	Waterloo
Dr F H Moore	Liverpool
Eric Evans	Sale
D Chapman	Broughton Park
Humphrey Luya	Waterloo
Joe Mycock	Sale
John Cain	Waterloo
Eric Bole	Waterloo
P M Rhodes	Manchester

Bill Hook	Gloucester
Jack Gregory	Blackheath
R H Wood	Bristol
E M Ednie	Cheltenham
S F Dangerfield	Gloucester
W Burrows	Gloucester
I Pearce	Cheltenham
Tom Price	Cheltenham
F C Hill	Bristol
J Watkins	Gloucester
T A Garrett	Clifton
R Hodge	Gloucester
G A Hudson (capt)	Gloucester
D G Pratten	Bristol
H H Mills	Stroud

== See also ==
- English rugby union system
- Rugby union in England
