= 1947–48 Rugby Union County Championship =

English rugby union competition

1947–48 County Championship
- Countries: England
- Champions: Lancashire (5th title)
- Runners-up: Eastern Counties

The 1947–48 Rugby Union County Championship was the 48th edition of England's premier rugby union club competition at the time.

Lancashire won the competition for the fifth time after defeating Eastern Counties in the final.

== Final ==
13 March 1948

Eastern Counties	0–5	Lancashire
		Try: Bole; Con: Heaton

University Ground, Cambridge
Referee: R A Gabb

H E R Chew	London Hospital
G Rowlands	London Hospital
Peter Hepburn	Woodford
Viv Harrison	London Welsh
P J Langley	Ipswich
Peter Hepburn	Woodford
B W Sykes	Wasps
D Marrack	London Hospital
W A Gluck	Old Merchant Taylors'
R Crouch	Rosslyn Park
T A Hall	Old Haileyburians
Fred Huskisson (capt)	Old Merchant Taylors'
J B Bland	Wasps
E P Cutler	Southend
Robert Huskisson	Old Merchant Taylors'

J Bradburn	Wigan Old Boys
Dickie Guest	Waterloo
Jack Heaton (capt)	Waterloo
A C Shuker	Broughton Park
Cyril Holmes	Manchester
W B Cartnmell	Liverpool University
Gordon Rimmer	Wigan Old Boys
R Logan	Sale
Eric Evans	Sale
John Williams	Army & Liverpool University
Samuel Victor Perry	Waterloo
Humphrey Luya	Waterloo
P M Rhodes	Manchester
Joe Mycock	Sale
Eric Bole	Waterloo

== See also ==
- English rugby union system
- Rugby union in England
