= 1928–29 Rugby Union County Championship =

English rugby union competition

1928–29 County Championship
- Countries: England
- Champions: Middlesex (1st title)
- Runners-up: Lancashire

The 1928–29 Rugby Union County Championship was the 36th edition of England's premier rugby union club competition at the time.

Middlesex won the competition for the first time after defeating Lancashire in the final replay following a drawn match in the first match.

== Final ==
9 March 1929

Middlesex	8–8	Lancashire
Try: Carris (2); Con: McCullough		Try: Meikle, Wilson; Con: Ogden

Twickenham Stadium
Attendance: 12,000
Referee: J Stephens (North Midlands)

C J King-Turner	Blackheath
H E Carris	Old Millhillians
S E P Edenborough	Westminster Bank
C C Moore	Rosslyn Park
Jim Reeve	Harlequins
Colin Laird	Harlequins
Alan Key	Old Cranleighans
Wavell Wakefield (capt)	Harlequins
Ronald Cove-Smith	King's College Hospital
D J MacMyn	King's College Hospital
P T Cooper	Rosslyn Park
T E Morel	Old Leysians
C R McCullough	London Scottish
W A U Thomas	London Welsh
A E C Prescott	Harlequins

Jack Wallens	Waterloo
Guy Wilson	Manchester
J C Benson	Waterloo
E Ogden	Fylde
I A D Aitchison	Fylde
Steve Meikle	Waterloo
John MacArthur	Waterloo
Joe Periton (capt)	Waterloo
G Taylor	Waterloo
A H Rigby	Waterloo
Roy Foulds	Waterloo
S W Livesay	Manchester
M G Layton	Manchester
Harold Jones	Manchester
T Thewils	Liverpool University

== Final Replay ==
23 March 1929

Lancashire	8-9	Middlesex
Try: Benson; Con: Ogden; Pen: Ogden		Try: Morel; Con: Powell; Drop: Stephenson

St Anthony's Road, Blundellsands
Attendance: 8,000
Referee: J Stephens (North Midlands)

J W Stewart	Bolton
L Calder	Waterloo
J C Benson	Waterloo
E Ogden	Fylde
I A D Aitchison	Fylde
Steve Meikle	Waterloo
J McArthur	Waterloo
H G Periton (capt)	Waterloo
G Taylor	Waterloo
A H Rigby	Waterloo
Roy Foulds	Waterloo
S W Livesay	Manchester
M G Layton	Manchester
Harold Jones	Manchester
T Thewils	Liverpool University

C J King-Turner	Blackheath
H E Carris	Old Millhillians
S E P Edenborough	Westminster Bank
G V Stephenson	St Bartholomews's Hospital
Jim Reeve	Harlequins
Roger Spong	Old Millhillians
W C Powell	London Welsh
Wavell Wakefield (capt)	Harlequins
W Sargent	St Mary's Hospital
F S Kendall	Rosslyn Park
R Jones	London Welsh
T E Morel	Old Leysians
C R McCullough	London Scottish
W A U Thomas	London Welsh
A E C Prescott	Harlequins

== See also ==
- English rugby union system
- Rugby union in England
