= 1932–33 Rugby Union County Championship =

English rugby union competition

1932–33 County Championship
- Countries: England
- Champions: Hampshire (1st title)
- Runners-up: Lancashire

The 1932–33 Rugby Union County Championship was the 40th edition of England's premier rugby union club competition at the time.

Hampshire won the competition for the first time after defeating Lancashire in the final.

== Final ==
11 March 1933

| Hampshire | 18–7 | Lancashire |
| Try: Lauder, Ford; Con: Troop (2); Drop: Elliot (2), Meikle | | Pen: Ogden; Drop: Ogden |

Dean Court, Boscombe
Referee: E Holmes (Durham)

| G Gosling | United Services |
| R E Lauder | Trojans |
| J H L Phillips | Weymouth Coll & Cambridge U |
| Tuppy Owen-Smith | Oxford University |
| D St Clair Ford | United Services |
| W Elliot | United Services |
| C P B Goldson | Blackheath |
| T G P Crick | Devonport Services |
| E Humpish | Duke of Wellingtons Regiment |
| A Boast | Salisbury |
| Barney Evans | United Services |
| R C Harry (capt) | United Services |
| Ted Sadler | Royal Corps of Signals |
| Carlton Troop | Aldershot Services |
| Dudley Kemp | Trojans |

| R Horne | Furness |
| I S Calder | Waterloo |
| Roy Leyland | Liverpool University |
| E Ogden | Fylde |
| E W D Gore | Waterloo |
| Steve Meikle | Waterloo |
| J C Pank | Furness |
| J A Cooper | Warrington |
| Henry Toft (capt) | Manchester University |
| W H Leather | Liverpool |
| W J Leather | Liverpool |
| A N Clint | Waterloo |
| Henry Fry | Liverpool |
| G Taylor | Waterloo |
| J H Chubb | Waterloo |

== See also ==
- English rugby union system
- Rugby union in England
