= 1930–31 Rugby Union County Championship =

English rugby union competition

1930–31 County Championship
- Countries: England
- Champions: Gloucestershire (7th title)
- Runners-up: Warwickshire

The 1930–31 Rugby Union County Championship was the 38th edition of England's premier rugby union club competition at the time.

Gloucestershire won the competition for the seventh time after defeating Warwickshire in the final.

== Final ==
14 March 1931

Gloucestershire	10–9	Warwickshire
Try: McCanlis, Saxby; Con: Boughton (2)		Try: Ford, Smith; Pen: Dunkley

Kingsholm Stadium

Harold Boughton	Gloucester
K Durling	Bristol
Maurice McCanlis	Gloucester
Don Burland	Bristol
C A Osborne	Cheltenham
C B Carter	Bristol
W Thomas	Lydney
Sam Tucker	Bristol
W Wadley	Gloucester
Alfred Carpenter	Gloucester
R N Williams	St Bartholomew's Hospital
P G Lambert	Bristol
Leslie Saxby	Gloucester
J Davies	Gloucester
K Salmon	Cross Keys

H J Davies	Rugby
H E W Smith	Rugby
T P Mayo	Coventry
G Harriman	Coventry
S H Bonham	Coventry
A Gascoyne	Coventry
W E Lole	Coventry
T Coulson	Coventry
F Ford	Coventry
A Walker	Coventry
Reginald Roberts	Coventry
H Wheatley	Coventry
N C Marr	Rugby
Arthur Rowley	Coventry
Pop Dunkley	Harlequins

== See also ==
- English rugby union system
- Rugby union in England
