= 1931–32 Rugby Union County Championship =

English rugby union competition

1931–32 County Championship
- Countries: England
- Champions: Gloucestershire (8th title)
- Runners-up: Durham County

The 1931–32 Rugby Union County Championship was the 39th edition of England's premier rugby union club competition at the time.

Gloucestershire won the competition for the eighth time (and third in succession) after defeating Durham County in the final.

== Semifinals ==
Team one	Team two	Score
Durham County	Warwickshire	
Gloucestershire	Hampshire	

== Final ==
12 March 1932

Durham County	3–9	Gloucestershire
Try: McNay		Try: Fry; Con: Burland; Drop: James

Blaydon-on-Tyne
Attendance: 12,000
Referee: F G Stephens (North Midlands)

J G Askew	Durham City
Cliff Harrison	Hartlepool Rovers
E C Mercer	Durham City
Carl Aarvold (capt)	Blackheath
B R F McNay	Durham City
W T Anderson	Westoe & Cambridge University
C P B Goldson	Hartlepool Rovers
R Powney	Durham City
J Taylor	North Durham
J T Roddam	Percy Park
S B Olsen	Hartlepool Rovers
W B Allen	Sunderland
F Nicholson	North Durham
A McLaren	Durham City
D Lascelles	Darlington

Tom Brown	Bristol
N C Sheppard	Gloucester
Maurice McCanlis	Gloucester
Don Burland	Bristol
Christopher Tanner	Gloucester
C B Carter	Bristol
R James	Gloucester
F Wadley	Gloucester
Alfred Carpenter	Gloucester
E Comley	Gloucester
K Salmon	Cross Keys
P G Lambert	Bristol
J Hemming	Gloucester
Leslie Saxby (capt)	Gloucester
C Fry	Cheltenham

== See also ==
- English rugby union system
- Rugby union in England
