= Joseph Stewart =

Joseph or Joe Stewart may refer to:

- Joseph Stewart (U.S. Army officer) (1822–1904), American army officer and commander of Alaska
- Joseph Stewart (Medal of Honor) (fl. 1865), American Civil War soldier and Medal of Honor recipient
- Joseph Spencer Stewart (1897–1934), American academic administrator, president of the University of North Georgia
- Joe Stewart (baseball) (1879–1913), American baseball pitcher
- Joe Stewart (politician) (Joseph Francis Stewart, 1889–1964), Irish politician
- Joe Stewart (rugby union), Irish international rugby union player.
- JJ Stewart (John Joseph Stewart, 1923–2002), New Zealand rugby union coach
- Joseph D. Stewart (1942–2019), American Marine Corps general
- Proposition Joe, fictional character in HBO TV series The Wire, real name Joe or Joseph Stewart
