= Alan Brown (rugby union, born 1911) =

English rugby union player (1911–1987)

- Full name: Alan Arthur Brown
- Born: 28 August 1911 St Helens, Lancs, England
- Died: 12 August 1987 (aged 75) Honiton, Devon, England

Rugby union career
- Position: Wing-forward
International career
Years	Team	Apps	(Points)
1938	England	1	(0)

Alan Arthur Brown (28 August 1911 – 12 August 1987) was an English international rugby union player.

Raised in Sutton, St Helens, Brown attended Cowley Secondary School, which also produced two other England internationals during the 1930s, cousins Dickie Guest and Jack Heaton.

Brown made representative appearances for Lancashire early in his career, before moving down to Devon to work as a lecturer in physical training at St Luke's College, Exeter, from where he gained his solitary England cap. He played as a wing-forward against Scotland at Twickenham in the 1938 Home Nations, deputising for an injured Reg Bolton.

== See also ==
- List of England national rugby union players
