= 1947 Five Nations Championship =

Rugby union competition

- Date: 1 January - 19 April 1947
- Countries: England; France; Ireland; Scotland; Wales

Tournament statistics
- Champions: England and Wales
- Matches played: 10

The 1947 Five Nations Championship was the eighteenth series of the rugby union Five Nations Championship. Including the previous incarnations as the Home Nations and Five Nations, this was the fifty-third series of the northern hemisphere rugby union championship. Ten matches were played between 1 January and 19 April. It was contested by England, France, Ireland, Scotland and Wales.

The competition was not only the first after World War II, but also marked the return of France after an absence of 16 years. Les Bleus had been expelled from the tournament after the 1931 event over allegations of professionalism and administrative deficiencies; they were readmitted after the 1939 tournament, but shortly thereafter war forced the suspension of international rugby. The return of France established the Five Nations lineup until 2000, when the admission of Italy created the modern Six Nations.

== Participants ==
The teams involved were:

Nation	Venue	City	Captain
England	Twickenham	London	Joe Mycock/Jack Heaton
France	Stade Olympique Yves-du-Manoir	Colombes	Louis Junquas
Ireland	Lansdowne Road	Dublin	Con Murphy/Jack Monteith
Scotland	Murrayfield	Edinburgh	Keith Geddes/Billy Munro/Russell Bruce
Wales	National Stadium/St. Helens	Cardiff/Swansea	Haydn Tanner

== Table ==
Pos	Team	Pld	W	D	L	PF	PA	PD	Pts
1	Wales	4	3	0	1	37	17	+20	6
1	England	4	3	0	1	39	36	+3	6
3	Ireland	4	2	0	2	33	18	+15	4
3	France	4	2	0	2	23	20	+3	4
5	Scotland	4	0	0	4	16	57	−41	0

== Results ==
1 January 1947

France	8–3	Scotland

Paris

18 January 1947

Wales	6–9	England

Cardiff

25 January 1947

Ireland	8–12	France

Dublin

1 February 1947

Scotland	8–22	Wales

Edinburgh

8 February 1947

Ireland	22–0	England

Dublin

22 February 1947

Scotland	0–3	Ireland

Edinburgh

15 March 1947

England	24–5	Scotland

London

22 March 1947

France	0–3	Wales

Paris

29 March 1947

Wales	6–0	Ireland

Swansea

19 April 1947

England	6–3	France

London
