= Edward Richards (disambiguation) =

Edward Richards (1908–1991) was the Premier of Bermuda.

Edward Richards may also refer to:

- Edward Windsor Richards (1831–1921), British engineer and steel maker
- Billy Richards (rugby union), Australian rugby union player
- Edwin Richards (field hockey) (1879–1930), Welsh field hockey player, sometimes referred to as Edward
- Eddie Richards, British DJ
- Edward Richards (Massachusetts politician), early settler of Dedham, Massachusetts
- Barbara Ann Wilcox, born Edward Price Richards, American trans woman
- Eddie Richards (rugby union)

== See also ==
- Ed Richards (disambiguation)
- Ted Richards (disambiguation)
