= Keith Downes =

English cricketer and soldier

Personal information
- Full name: Keith Drummond Downes
- Born: 12 June 1917; Liverpool, Lancashire, England
- Died: 18 February 1990 (aged 72); Sheffield, Yorkshire, England
- Batting: Right-handed
- Role: Wicket-keeper

Domestic team information
- Years: Team
- 1939: Cambridge University

Career statistics
Competition	First-class
Matches	8
Runs scored	102
Batting average	9.27
100s/50s	–/–
Top score	27
Catches/stumpings	6/1
- Source: Cricinfo, 4 October 2020

Keith Drummond Downes (12 June 1917 – 18 February 1990) was a British first-class cricketer, rugby union player and soldier.

== Early life and education ==
Downes was born at Liverpool in June 1917. He later studied at Christ's College at the University of Cambridge, matriculating in 1936.

== Career ==
While studying at Cambridge, he played first-class cricket for Cambridge University in 1939, making eight appearances as a wicket-keeper. He scored 102 runs in his eight matches, at an average of 9.27 and a high score of 27. Behind the stumps he took 6 catches and made a single stumping. Downes played rugby union for Leicester Tigers between 1937 and 1939, after making his debut in March 1937 he did not feature again until December 1938, such was his form for Cambridge University & Leicester he was offered a Welsh international trial, but refused on the grounds that he was not sufficiently qualified, and instead was an unused reserve for Scotland in their 1939 Home Nations Championship match against Wales. Downes played 15 matches for Leicester in total.

The beginning of the Second World War in September 1939 saw Downes commissioned into the King's Regiment (Liverpool) as a second lieutenant in September 1940. He was transferred to the Royal Artillery in June 1942 and by 1945, he was a war substantive lieutenant with the Royal Welch Fusiliers. Downes married Barbara Benneit Wilton at Newcastle in July 1942 and died at Sheffield in February 1990.
