= Deryck Monteith =

Rugby union player from Northern Ireland

- Full name: Jack Deryck Erle Monteith
- Born: 24 August 1922 Ballymoney, County Antrim
- Died: 26 June 1992 (aged 69)

Rugby union career
- Position: Centre
International career
Years	Team	Apps	(Points)
1947	Ireland	3	(0)

Jack Deryck Erle Monteith (24 August 1922 — 26 June 1992), known as Deryck Monteith, was an Irish rugby union international.

== Career ==
Monteith, a centre, played his rugby for Malone, Queen's University and Ulster.

Capped three times by Ireland in the 1947 Five Nations Championship, Monteith debuted in a win over England at Lansdowne Road, then led the team for the next two fixtures, after incumbent captain Con Murphy was dropped from the side. These remained his only Ireland caps.

== Personal life ==
Eldest son of a Ballymoney dentist, Monteith had one brother and five sisters. He was a close friend in his later years of athlete Mary Peters.

== See also ==
- List of Ireland national rugby union players
