= Sammy McQueen =

Scotland international rugby union player

- Full name: Samuel Brown McQueen
- Born: 27 January 1896 Liverpool, Lancashire, England
- Died: 16 September 1983 (aged 87) Ulverston, Cumbria, England

Rugby union career
- Position: Fly-half
International career
Years	Team	Apps	(Points)
1923	Scotland	4	(3)

Samuel Brown McQueen (27 January 1896 — 16 September 1983) was a Scottish international rugby union player.

McQueen was born in Liverpool and educated at Merchant Taylors' Boys' School, Crosby.

A fly-half, McQueen was capped four times for Scotland in 1923, debuting in a win over France at Inverleith. He set up Leslie Gracie's winning try against Wales in his next match and then scored a try himself to help Scotland defeat Ireland at Lansdowne Road. For his final appearance, a Calcutta Cup match, Scotland needed a win to secure the grand slam, but went down to England 6–8. He was the first international produced by Crosby club Waterloo and also made three appearances for the Barbarians.

== See also ==
- List of Scotland national rugby union players
