= Andrew Bulteel =

English rugby union player

- Born: Andrew Marcus Bulteel; 29 September 1850 Liverpool, Lancashire
- Died: 3 June 1888 (aged 37) Melbourne, Australia

Rugby union career
- Position: Forward
Senior career
Years	Team	Apps	(Points)
- Manchester Football Club
International career
Years	Team	Apps	(Points)
1875	England	1	

Andrew Bulteel (29 September 1850 – 3 June 1888) was a rugby union international who represented England in 1875.

== Early life and family background ==
Andrew Marcus Bulteel was born in September 1850 in Liverpool, the second son of Andrew Hume Bulteel and his wife Catherine Chartres. The Bulteel family was of Huguenot descent and had arrived in England in the 1600s, from France after the Revocation of the Edict of Nantes. Three brothers had made the trip, one died unmarried in London whilst the two remaining brothers acquired the estate of Flete in Devon. Andrew's grandfather, Edward Bulteel (a cousin of John Crocker Bulteel the M.P. of Flete) settled at Sligo in Ireland, where his uncle was Collector of the Customs. He married Eleanor Hume, of Scottish descent and a descendant of General Walker, Governor of Derry. They had a number of children including three sons Edward Josiah, Samuel William (Director of the Lancashire and Yorkshire Railway), and Andrew Hume, (Andrew's father), as well as six daughters (Susan, Matilda, Ellen, Jane, Margaret, Anne and Mary). Andrew Hume like his great uncle became a Collector of H.M. Customs, but based in Liverpool. He married, on 8 June 1841, Catherine, daughter of Rev. Marcus Chartres, Prebendary of Clone and Rector of Ferns, County Wexford and Sophia Irvin of Enniskillen. Andrew Marcus had an older brother, Edward, and three sisters Sophia-Matilda, Eleanor-Mary and Emily-Catherine.

== Rugby union career ==
The Bulteel family had moved to Manchester such that by 1871 Andrew was living in Chorlton-on-Medlock. In Manchester he played rugby there he played for the Manchester Football Club. Bulteel made his only international appearance on 13 December 1875 at Rathmines, Dublin against Ireland in a 20 a-side rugby international, won by England by a goal to nil.

== Later life and career ==
Andrew joined the 40th Lancashire Rifle Volunteer Corps, rising to the rank of Lieutenant, but he resigned his Commission on 15 March 1879. It seemed that he later moved to Cachar, India and died just ten years after leaving the army on 3 June 1888 at Rochester-lodge, Little Flinders Street (Flinders Lane), in Melbourne. He was buried in Melbourne General Cemetery.
