= Matthew Neely =

Matthew Neely may refer to:

- Matthew M. Neely, American politician from West Virginia
- Matthew Neely (rugby union), Irish international rugby union player
