= Jack Heaton =

Jack Heaton may refer to:

- John Heaton (athlete) (1908–1976), known as Jack, American bobsledder and skeleton racer
- Jack Heaton (rugby union) (1912–1998), rugby union international for England
