= William Starr Basinger =

American lawyer

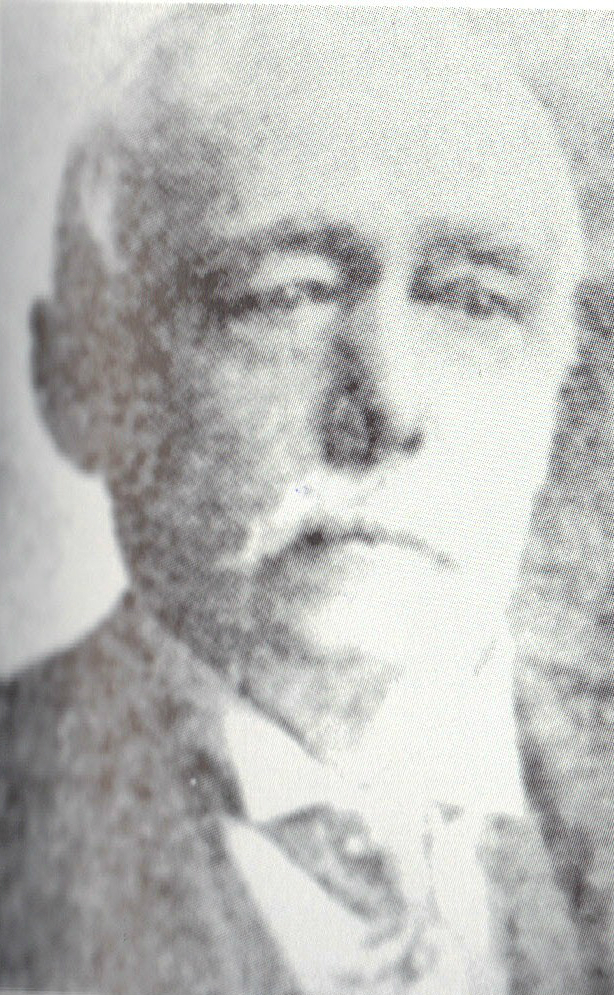

2nd President of the University of North Georgia
- In office 1886–1893
- Preceded by: David W. Lewis
- Succeeded by: Isaac W. Waddell

Personal details
- Born: 1827 Savannah, Georgia
- Died: 1910 (aged 83)
- Children: Margaret, Garnett, Will, Mary Leslie, Thomas, Walter
- Education: Franklin College of Arts and Sciences

Military service
- Allegiance: Confederate States of America
- Branch/service: Confederate States Army
- Rank: Major
- Unit: 18th Georgia Volunteer Infantry
- Battles/wars: American Civil War: Second Battle of Fort Wagner

William Starr Basinger (1827–1910) was a lawyer, military officer, state legislator, and the president of the University of North Georgia. He served as a major in the 18th Georgia Battalion of the Confederate States Army during the Civil War. In 1886 Basinger, succeeding David W. Lewis, became the second president of North Georgia Agricultural College (now UNG).
