= Ted Richards (disambiguation) =

Ted Richards (born 1983) is an Australian rules footballer.

Ted Richards may also refer to

- Ted Richards (American football) (1901 – 1978), American football player
- Ted Richards (artist) (1946 – 2023), web designer and cartoonist

== See also ==
- Richards (surname)
- Edward Richards (disambiguation)
