= H. J. C. Turner =

England international rugby union player

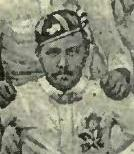
- Born: Henry John Cecil Turner; 23 January 1850 Wartling, Sussex, England
- School: St Nicholas College, Lancing (Lancing College)

Rugby union career
- Position: Forward
Senior career
Years	Team	Apps	(Points)
- Manchester Football Club
International career
Years	Team	Apps	(Points)
1871-1871	England	1	

Henry John Cecil Turner was a rugby union international who represented England in 1871 in the first international match, held against Scotland.

== Early life ==
H. J. C. Turner was born in Wartling, Sussex in 1850, and was christened on 3 March 1850 in the parish church. He was the younger son of John Turner (1817 to 1858) and Louisa Kemp (born 1824). His father was the Curate of Wartling at the time, a graduate of Balliol College, Oxford University (B.A. 1838, M.A. 1844), he became the Rector of Tiffield in 1853 and died in 1858. Henry had at least two brothers, Edmund Malcolm Turner (born 1847) and Cyril James (born 1852), and two sisters, Ellen (born c.1849) and Alice Mary (1854–1945). His brother was educated at Marlborough College but Henry was educated at St Nicholas College, Lancing (Lancing College) Having entered Lancing in 1861 and left in 1867, he would have been a contemporary of Reginald Birkett who later played alongside him in the England rugby squad. His brother, Cyril James, also went to Lancing and eventually became a member of Lloyd's of London.

== Rugby union career ==
By 1871, Turner had moved to Manchester and there he played for the Manchester Football Club. Turner made his international debut on 27 March 1871 at Edinburgh in the Scotland vs England match, the first international rugby match. He was one of four Manchester players to be selected. He was not selected to play for England again, perhaps due to his possible emigration.

== Later life and career ==
In 1871, Turner was living in Manchester, boarding at the Albion Hotel in the Piccadilly district of the city. He was a banker's clerk. His brother, Edmund, had previously migrated to the United States, but whether Henry joined him there is not known. His old school, Lancing College, registered him as having died in a publication of their register in 1900, but a date or details were not given.
