= RAF Wartling =

RAF Wartling
- Near Wartling, East Sussex in England

Site information
- Type: RAF Radar station
- Condition: Closed

Location
- Coordinates: 50.84°N 0.34978°E

Site history
- In use: 1941–1976
- Battles/wars: Second World War; Cold War

Royal Air Force Wartling or more simply RAF Wartling is a former Royal Air Force station located near the village of Wartling in East Sussex. It was a Second World War and later Cold War Ground Controlled Interception (GCI) station built to complement the nearby Chain Home station at RAF Pevensey.

== Second World War ==
Wartling became operational in 1941 and was used to control fighter aircraft and guide them towards approaching German aircraft. Originally based in caravans the station had a brick-built operations block that came into operation in July 1943. Wartling helped track and destroy 380 German V1 flying bombs. Although the nearby RAF Pevensey had closed in December 1945, Wartling remained open as one of the few remaining GCI stations in the South of England.

The station was home to No. 24 Wing RAF and No. 24 Sector RAF.

== Cold War ==
With the threat of attack using nuclear weapons the station was used as part of the ROTOR air defence radar system and a protected underground operations rooms was built at Wartling. Construction started at the end of 1951 but was not completed until February 1955. In 1956 a new Decca AMES Type 80 search radar was installed to replace the earlier equipment. With the increased range of the Type 80 radar other radar stations in the South East began to close and in April 1958 it became a Master Radar Station responsible for all British airspace South of the Thames.

In 1959 it supplied the last known radar trace to accident investigators following the fatal crash of the prototype Handley Page Victor B.2 serial number XH668. When other Master Radar Stations were modernised in the 1960s Wartling went out of use and finally closed on 3 December 1964. The site was sold in 1976.

== See also ==
- List of former Royal Air Force stations
- ROTOR
