= Graham Meikle =

England international rugby union player

- Full name: Graham William Churchill Meikle
- Born: 14 October 1911 Waterloo, England
- Died: 18 June 1981 (aged 69) Whitehaven, England

Rugby union career
- Position: Wing
International career
Years	Team	Apps	(Points)
1934	England	3	(12)

Graham William Churchill Meikle (14 October 1911 – 18 June 1981) was an English international rugby union player.

== Rugby career ==
Meikle was a Leicester and Waterloo wing three-quarter, capped three times for England in the 1934 Home Nations, contributing four tries. He set an England by scoring a try in each of his first three Test matches, which included two on debut against Wales at Cardiff. In 1938, Meikle announced his retirement, due to a knee injury.

== Personal life ==
Born in Waterloo, Meikle was the younger brother of England international Steve Meikle. His wife Nancy was the sister-in-law of Scotland international Harry Greenlees, while another of his wife's sisters married Stephen.

== See also ==
- List of England national rugby union players
