= No. 24 Wing RAF =

No. 24 Wing RAF 24th (Training) Wing RFC No. 24 (Base) Defence Wing RAF No. 24 (Base Defence) Sector RAF No. 24 (Air Defence Missile) Wing RAF No. 24 (Surface to Air Missile) Wing RAF No. 24 (SAM) Servicing Wing RAF
- Active: 1916-19; 1944; 1959-61; 1961-63; 1963
- Country: United Kingdom
- Branch: Royal Flying Corps; Royal Air Force
- Type: Wing

No. 24 Wing RAF is a former Royal Air Force wing that was operational during the First and the Second World Wars and the Cold War.

== First World War ==
24th (Training) Wing RFC was formed on 25 September 1916 at Wyton Aerodrome, it joined Northern Group Command on 10 January 1917. The wing controlled Wyton, Harlaxton Aerodrome & Spittlegate Aerodrome with the wing moving to Spittlegate on 24 March 1917, the wing then moved to Grantham during October 1918 and moved to 12th Group RAF during March 1919 and was disbanded on 8 April 1919.

== Second World War ==
No. 24 (Base) Defence Wing RAF was formed on 16 February 1944 under No. 85 Group RAF at RAF Acklington it controlled:

- No. 147 Airfield Headquarters RAF
- No. 148 Airfield Headquarters RAF

The wing moved to RAF Blakelaw on 15 March 1944, then to RAF Stapleford Tawney on 27 April 1944, then to RAF Wartling on 3 May 1944, where it was disbanded on 12 May 1944.

No. 24 (Base Defence) Sector RAF was formed on 12 May 1944 at Wartling, it moved to Meuvaines, Boves, then St. Denis Westerem/Ghent on 15 January 1945 where it was disbanded on 16 March 1945 into No. 85 Group Unit RAF. It controlled:

- No. 147 Wing RAF
- No. 148 Wing RAF

== Cold War ==
The wing was reformed on 1 April 1959 at RAF Watton under No. 12 Group RAF as No. 24 (Air Defence Missile) Wing RAF controlling:

- No. 263 Squadron RAF
- No. 242 Squadron RAF
- No. 266 Squadron RAF

The wing was renamed to No. 24 (Surface to Air Missile) Wing RAF on 1 June 1961 controlling 263 & 266 Squadrons. On 1 February 1963 the wing was renamed No. 24 (SAM) Servicing Wing RAF still at Watton and disbanded on 31 August 1963.

== See also ==
- List of wings of the Royal Air Force
