= Louis Junquas =

France international rugby union player

- Born: 11 September 1920 Saint-Vincent-de-Tyrosse, France
- Died: 23 May 2002 (aged 81) Mont-de-Marsan, France
- Height: 5 ft 9 in (175 cm)
- Weight: 184 lb (83 kg)

Rugby union career
- Position: Centre
International career
Years	Team	Apps	(Points)
1945–48	France	13	(0)

Louis Junquas (11 September 1920 – 23 May 2002) was a French international rugby union player.

A shoemaker from Saint-Vincent-de-Tyrosse, Junquas was active in the 1940s and 1950s, playing for Tyrosse RCS, Aviron Bayonnais and Lyon Olympique. He was capped 13 times for France during the immediate post–war years, debuting against the British Army in the 1945–46 Victory Internationals. His international career included a period as team captain, for the 1947 Five Nations, when France returned to the competition after a 16–year absence.

Junquas later served on the FFR selection committee.

== See also ==
- List of France national rugby union players
