= Wartling =

Village in East Sussex, England

Coordinates: 50.86°N 0.35°E

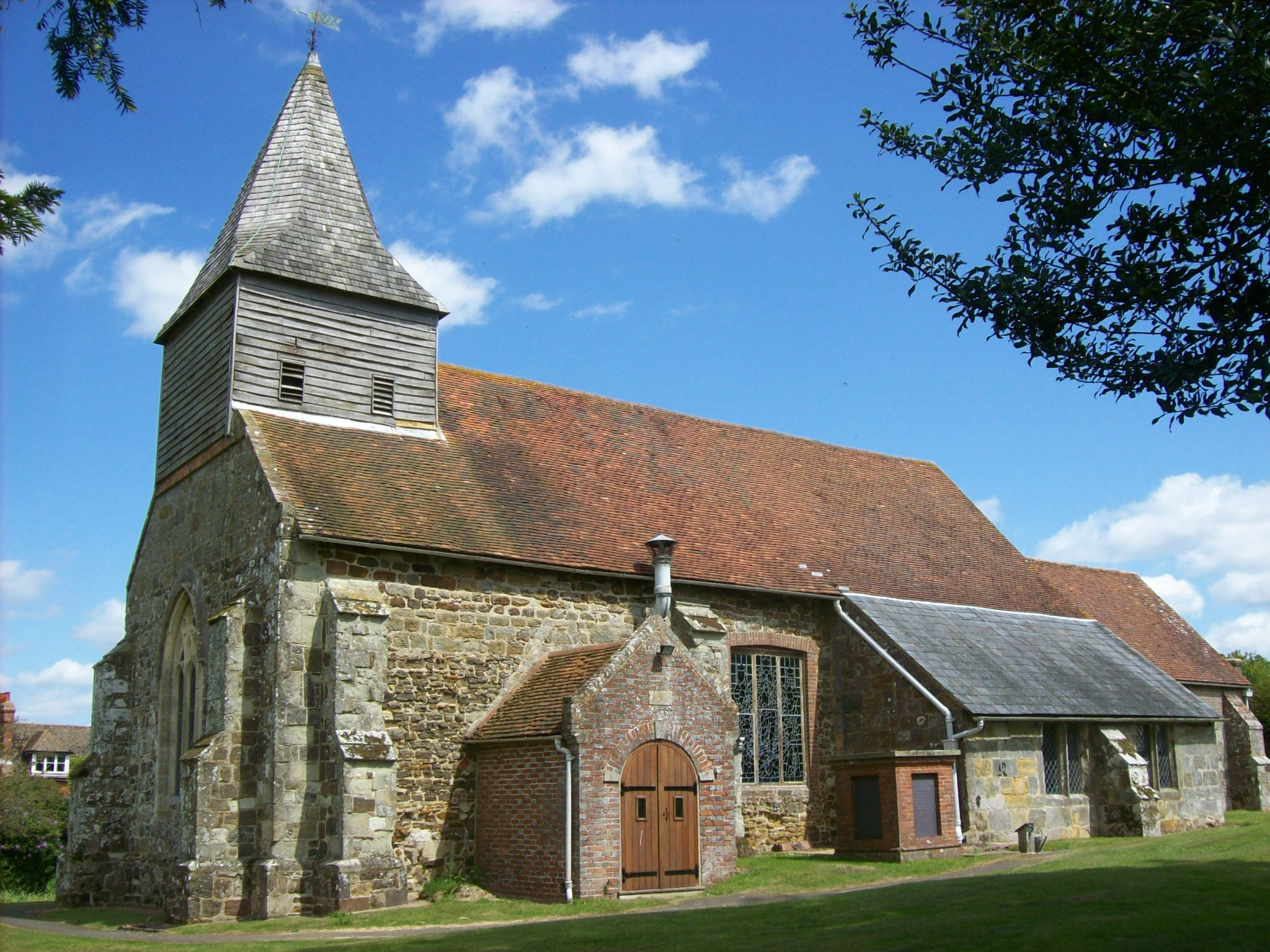
- St Mary Magdalene parish church

- Location within East Sussex
- Area: 11.1 km^{2} (4.3 sq mi)
- Population: 446 (2011)
  - Density: 93/sq mi (36/km^{2})
- OS grid reference: TQ657092
  - London: 49 miles (79 km) NNW
- District: Wealden
- Shire county: East Sussex
- Region: South East
- Country: England
- Sovereign state: United Kingdom
- Post town: HAILSHAM
- Postcode district: BN27
- Dialling code: 01323
- Police: Sussex
- Fire: East Sussex
- Ambulance: South East Coast
- UK Parliament: Bexhill and Battle
- Website: Parish council

Wartling is a village and civil parish in the Wealden District of East Sussex, England. It lies between Bexhill and Hailsham, at the northern edge of the Pevensey Levels. The parish includes Boreham Street, 1.2 miles (2 km) north-east of Wartling on the A271 road.

Wartling is mentioned in the Domesday Book of 1086, when there was a chapel there. The current church is dedicated to St Mary Magdalene was built in the 13th century, probably on the same site as the chapel. As with many villages on the Weald, the iron industry flourished here in the 17th and 18th centuries. Herons have nested in and around the village for well over a century.

== Notable people ==
- Mascal Gyles, (died 1652), Vicar of Wartling and polemicist against bowing “at the name of Jesus”, as described in the hymn by Caroline Maria Noel
- John Richardson Major, Vicar of Wartling 1846 to 1851
- H.J.C. Turner, born in the Wartling Place the Rectory at Wartling in 1850, the son of the curate, played in the first rugby international in 1871.

== St Mary Magdalene parish church ==
St Mary Magdalene is Grade I listed by Historic England. The chancel and nave are 13th-century, the north aisle and probably the now boarded bell turret are 14th-century and the south aisle is likely 15th-century. The south nave stained glass window depicting St Christopher was made by Hardman & Co in 1938. The carved heron lectern is from 1979.

The church is part of the United Benefice of St. Mary Magdalene Wartling and of All Saints Herstmonceux.

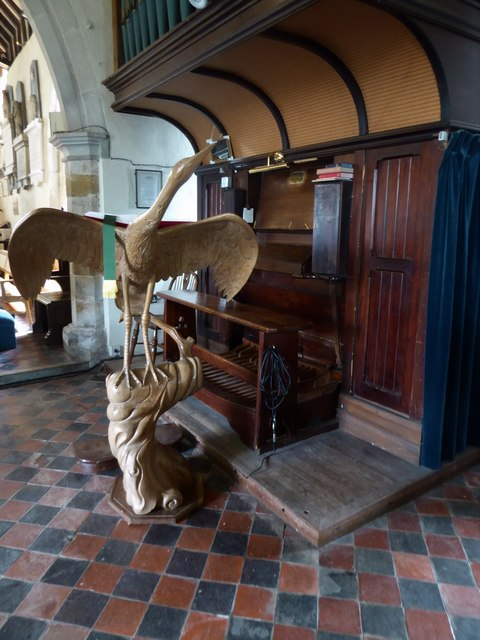
Carved heron lectern

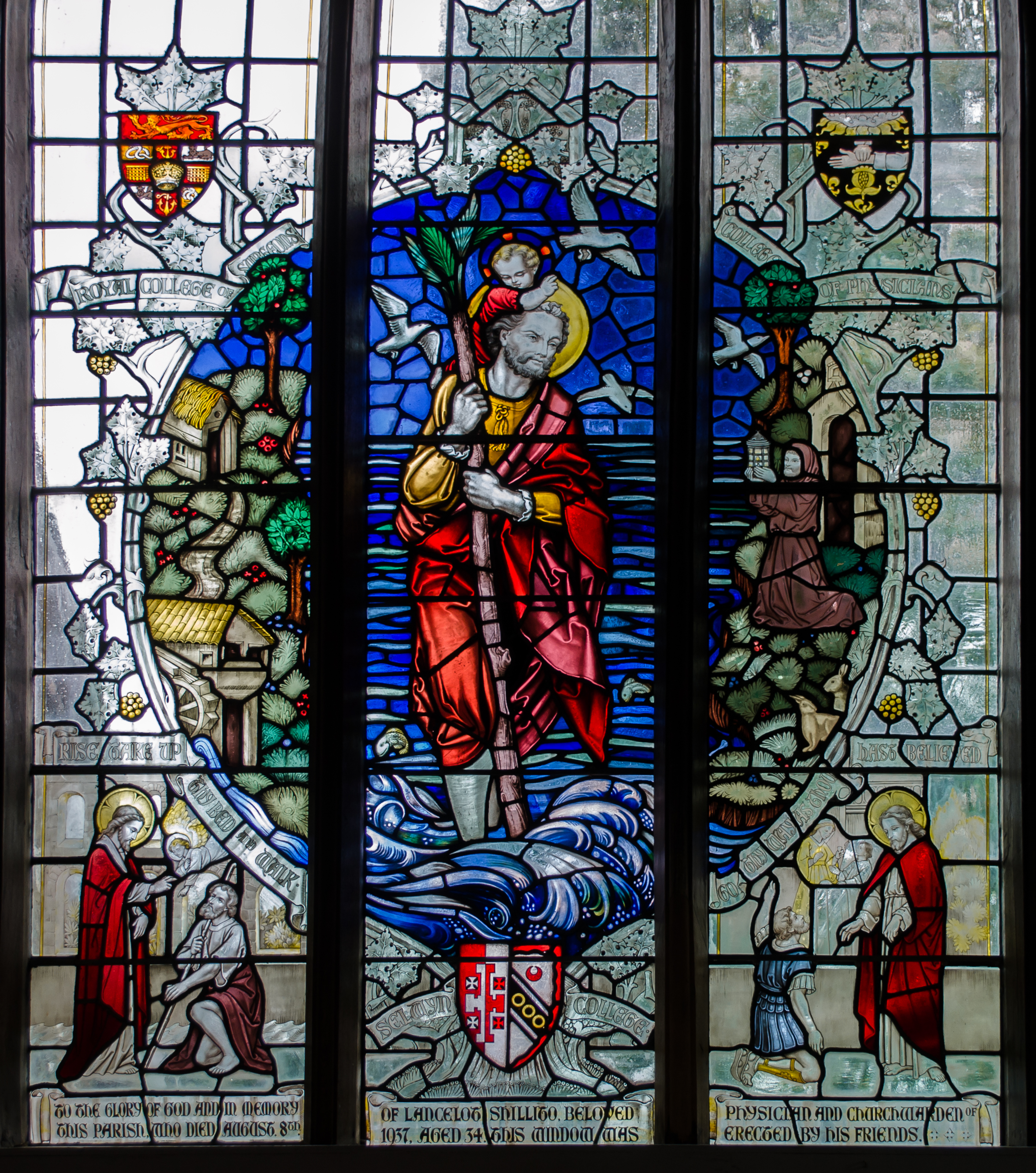
Stained glass window depicting St Christopher

== See also ==
- RAF Wartling
