= Alan Ashcroft =

English rugby union player (1930–2021)

- Born: 21 August 1930 St Helens, England
- Died: 26 January 2021 (aged 90)
- Height: 186 cm (6 ft 1 in)
- Weight: 94 kg (14 st 11 lb)
- School: Cowley Grammar School

Rugby union career
- Position: Number 8
Amateur team(s)
Years	Team	Apps	(Points)
- Waterloo FC
International career
Years	Team	Apps	(Points)
1956–1959	England	16	(3)
1959	British and Irish Lions	2	(0)

Alan Ashcroft (21 August 1930 – 26 January 2021) was an English rugby union player who played in the Number 8 position. Ashcroft played club rugby with Waterloo FC, was capped 16 times for England, and was a member of the British Lions team that toured in 1959.

== Rugby career ==
Ashcroft played club rugby with Waterloo FC. He captained the first team from 1959 to 1961. He continued playing for Waterloo's various teams until in his 50s.

Ashcroft made his début for the England national team against Wales in the 1956 Five Nations Championship. He played all four of England's tests in that year's Championship, as well as all four of England's matches during the 1957 Championship, where they won all four games to secure the title with a Grand Slam, and the 1958 Championship where England again were crowned champions with three matches won and a draw. Ashcroft's final appearance for England came against Scotland in the 1959 Five Nations Championship.

Ashcroft's performances for England saw him earn selection for the British Lions' 1959 tour to Australia and New Zealand. He made a total of 18 appearances during the tour, 16 against local opposition, and two test matches; one against New Zealand and one against Australia.

Ashcroft featured for a combined England & Wales side against Scotland & Ireland in October 1959 to mark the 50th anniversary of Twickenham Stadium. He also made 9 appearances for the Barbarians invitational team, including in three matches during their 1958 tour to South Africa.

== Personal life ==
Outside of rugby, Ashcroft was a schoolmaster at Liverpool College where he taught art.

In 2018, following a decision to award ceremonial caps to all former Lions players, Ashcroft was presented with his cap by Ray French at an event held at his former club Waterloo. At 88 years old, Ashcroft was amongst the oldest living former Lions players and the cap was presented 59 years after the tour took place.

He died in January 2021 at the age of 90.
