= Isaac W. Waddell =

Isaac Watts Waddell
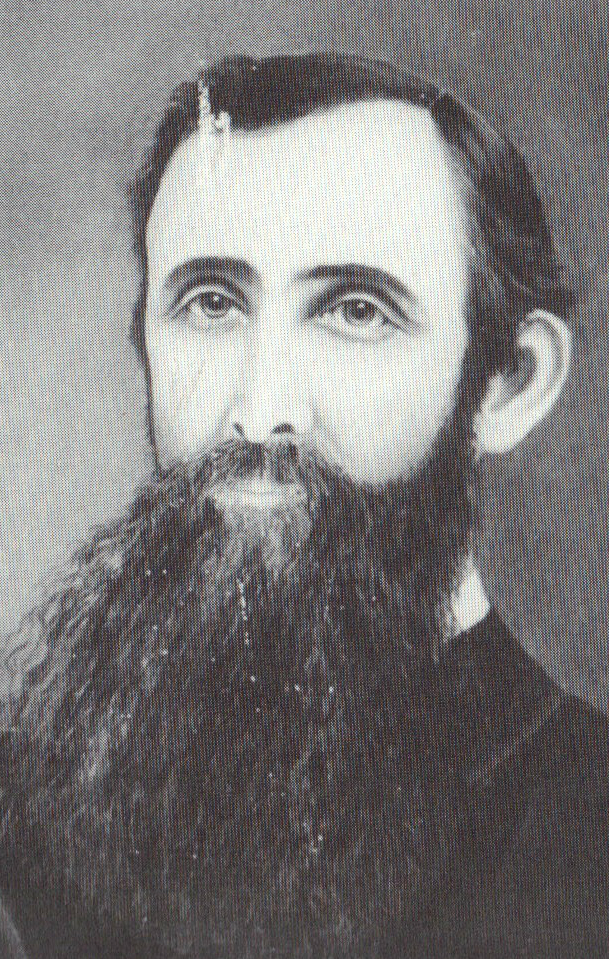
- Isaac W. Waddell

3rd President of the University of North Georgia
- In office 1893–1897
- Preceded by: William Starr Basinger
- Succeeded by: Joseph Spencer Stewart

Personal details
- Born: October 6, 1849 Marietta, Georgia, US
- Died: May 27, 1935 (aged 85) Jacksonville, Florida, US
- Spouse: Georgia Barnett Waddell
- Education: University of Georgia
- Profession: Educator, reverend

Isaac Watts Waddell (October 6, 1849, in Marietta, Georgia – May 27, 1935 in Jacksonville, Florida) was a Presbyterian pastor in Brunswick, Georgia, and the third president of the North Georgia Agricultural College (now the University of North Georgia). He is the grandson of former University of Georgia president Moses Waddel.

== Early life ==
Isaac Watts Waddell was born in Marietta, Georgia on October 6, 1849. He was the son of Dr. Isaac Watts Waddel and Sarah Rebecca Daniel Waddel. He earned his Bachelor of Arts and Master of Arts from the University of Georgia in 1870 and 1873 respectively. In 1882 Waddell was ordained by the presbytery of Savannah. He served as an evangelist in the presbytery of Macon from 1890 to 1893.

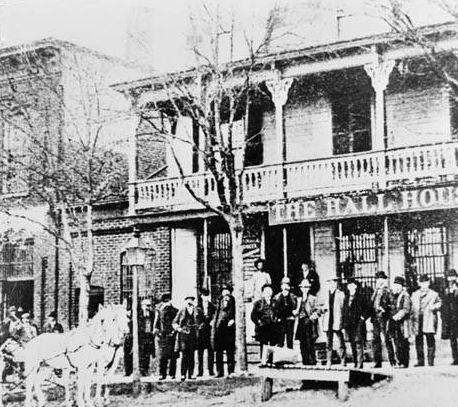
The Hall House in 1899. Waddell lived here from 1893 to 1897.

== Service in education ==
In 1893, facing pressure from the trustees, William Starr Basinger resigned from his position as president at North Georgia Agriculture College (NGAC) and was replaced by Isaac Watts Waddell. During all four year of his presidency at the school Waddell lived in the House Hotel, which remains a prominent building located on the Dahlonega town square.

At the beginning of Waddell's presidency at NGAC in 1893 the male enrollment at the college fell to ninety. Because the NGAC was required to enroll a minimum of one hundred male students, the school lost its appropriation the following year. However, by the end of Waddell's presidency male student enrollment at the school increased well above this mark and the appropriation to the college was restored.
