= Ed Richards =

Ed Richards may refer to:

- Ed Richards (chief executive) (born 1965/6), chief executive of Ofcom
- Ed Richards (fencer) (1929–2012), American Olympic fencer
- Ed Richards (footballer) (born 1999), Australian footballer

== See also ==
- Edward Richards (disambiguation)
