= Nigel Gibbs (rugby union) =

England international rugby union player

- Born: 24 September 1922
- Died: 26 May 2014 (aged 91)
- School: Clifton College
- University: University of Oxford
- Occupation: Headmaster

Rugby union career
- Position: Fullback
International career
Years	Team	Apps	(Points)
1954	England	2	(4)

Nigel Gibbs (24 September 1922 – 26 May 2014) was an English international rugby union player.

A Clifton College product, Gibbs was the brother of England prop George Gibbs. Their father, George H. Gibbs, was a noted public figure in Bristol who served as Secretary to the Lord Mayor and Sword-bearer.

Gibbs studied at Worcester College, Oxford, during the 1940s and served as a submariner in the war.

A fullback, Gibbs played his rugby for Oxford University, Bristol, Harlequins, Gloucestershire and Surrey. He won two England caps in the 1954 Five Nations Championship, kicking two conversions on debut against Scotland at Murrayfield to help England to a 13–3 win, then playing in Colombes against France.

Gibbs was Headmaster of Colston's School from 1965 to 1971.

== See also ==
- List of England national rugby union players
