= Jasper Bartlett =

English rugby union player

- Full name: Jasper Twining Bartlett
- Born: 17 October 1924 Birmingham, England
- Died: 16 January 1969 (aged 44) Liverpool, England
- School: Birkenhead Institute
- University: Liverpool University
- Occupation: Engineer

Rugby union career
- Position: Forward
International career
Years	Team	Apps	(Points)
1951	England	1	(0)

Jasper Twining Bartlett (17 October 1924 – 16 January 1969) was an English international rugby union player.

Born in Birmingham, Bartlett was a versatile forward and took up rugby at Birkenhead Institute.

Bartlett began playing for Waterloo in 1942 and while studying engineering competed for Liverpool University. In 1949, Bartlett won a County Championship with Cheshire. He was capped for England as a lock against Wales in a 1951 Five Nations match at Swansea. He captained both Cheshire and Combined Universities in representative matches.

In his later years, Bartlett lived in West Derby, Liverpool, where he died at the age of 44 in 1969.

== See also ==
- List of England national rugby union players
