= William MacLaren =

England international rugby union player

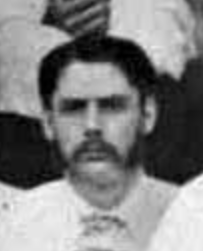
- Born: William MacLaren; 1844 Chorlton-cum-Hardy, Greater Manchester
- Died: Unknown

Rugby union career
- Position: Three-quarters
Amateur team(s)
Years	Team	Apps	(Points)
-	Manchester		
International career
Years	Team	Apps	(Points)
1871	England	1	

William MacLaren was a rugby union international who represented England in the first rugby international in 1871.

== Early life ==
William MacLaren was born on 1844 in Chorlton, Lancashire.

== Rugby union career ==
MacLaren made his international debut on 27 March 1871 at Edinburgh in the first international and was contested by Scotland and England. He was one of four representatives from the Manchester Football Club, at the time Lancashire's foremost club.
