= Mascal Gyles =

Mascal Gyles (died 1652), was an English polemic.

Gyles was vicar of Ditchling, Sussex, from 1621 till about 1644. In 1648 he became vicar of Wartling, also in Sussex, as appears by an order of the House of Lords, 2 March of that year. Gyles was buried at Wartling 14 August 1652. By Sarah his wife (died 1640) he had a numerous family of sons and daughters. Gyles was engaged in a controversy, carried on with the usual personalities and violent invective of the period, with Thomas Barton, rector of Westmeston in Sussex, as to the propriety of bowing at the name of Jesus.

He wrote:

- A Treatise against Superstitious Jesu-Worship. Wherein the true sense of Phil. ii. 9, 10, is opened, and from thence is plainly shewed, and by sundry arguments proved, that corporell bowing at the name Jesu is neither commanded, grounded, nor warranted thereupon, &c., dedicated to Anthony Stapley, M.P. for Sussex, London, 1642, 4to, reprinted with Barton's reply, 1643.
- A Defense of a Treatise against Superstitious Jesu-Worship, falsely called scandalous, against the truly scandalous Answer of the Parson of Westmenston [sic] in Sussex, &c., dedicated to the House of Commons, London, 1643, 4to.
