= Robert Todd (rugby union) =

- Full name: Robert Todd
- Born: April 1847 Holcombe Brook, Bury, Lancashire, England
- Died: 9 February 1927 (aged 79) Stockport, Cheshire, England

Rugby union career
- Position: Forward
Amateur team(s)
Years	Team	Apps	(Points)
–	Manchester Football Club		
–	Lancashire		
International career
Years	Team	Apps	(Points)
1877	England	1	(0)

Robert Todd (April 1847 – 9 February 1927) was an English rugby union forward who played for the England in 1877. A prominent member of Manchester Football Club during the formative years of rugby in northern England, he also represented Lancashire and appeared in the leading North v South representative fixtures of the period.

== Early life and family ==
Todd was born in April 1847 at Holcombe Brook near Bury, Lancashire. He was the eldest son of William Todd, a cotton spinner and industrialist, and Elizabeth Todd (née Meadowcroft).

His father became a prominent figure in the Lancashire cotton industry, operating as a cotton spinner and manufacturer in the Heywood district and employing a substantial workforce. He later served as a magistrate and was widely known in commercial circles in northern England as a member of the Manchester Exchange. The Todd family had been engaged in manufacturing for at least one earlier generation, as Robert's grandfather, also named Robert Todd, was also a manufacturer.

Robert was the eldest of several children. His younger siblings included John, Margaret, Mary Ellen, Richard and William Henry.

Raised in the industrial cotton district of north-east Lancashire, Todd entered the textile trade himself and worked as a cotton cloth agent, a commercial role connected with the marketing and sale of cotton goods produced by Lancashire mills.

In 1883 he married Alice Wyles at St Andrew's Church, Allesley in Warwickshire. At the time he was living in Cheadle, Cheshire.

== Rugby career ==
Todd played as a forward for Manchester Football Club during the 1870s, when the club was one of the most important centres of rugby in northern England. He was already a regular member of the Manchester side by 1875, appearing in matches at the club's ground at Whalley Range.

Contemporary match reports show him as a consistent member of the Manchester forward pack during several seasons in the mid-1870s. Manchester was recognised for a style of play that emphasised passing, and one report noted that the side “excel in a branch of the game too little practised here, namely passing the ball”. Todd himself was described as “a man of reputation as a representative”, reflecting his standing in northern rugby circles during the period.

Todd's performances brought him into representative selection. He was chosen to play for the North in the prestigious North v South fixtures, among the most significant representative matches in English rugby before the development of organised county championships.

He also represented Lancashire in the inter-county match against Yorkshire in January 1877, one of the leading fixtures in northern rugby at the time.

Todd's representative appearances led to his selection for the England team. He won his only international cap on 5 March 1877 against Scotland at Raeburn Place, Edinburgh.

Despite the brevity of his international career, he remained a prominent member of the Manchester side for several seasons afterwards. Reports of club matches regularly included him among the forwards, and his standing within the club was reflected in 1879 when he captained one of the sides in a match between teams drawn from the Manchester club itself.

Todd also played a role in the wider rugby community and occasionally officiated matches, acting as referee in a fixture between Manchester Rangers and Wakefield Trinity.

== Later life ==
Alongside his sporting activities Todd pursued a career in the Lancashire cotton trade, working as a cotton cloth agent. He later lived in Cheadle and Stockport, where he retired from business.

His wife Alice died on 28 April 1926. Todd died on 9 February 1927 in Stockport.
