= Colin Fisher =

Scotland international rugby union player & administrator

- Born: Colin Fisher; 27 December 1949 (age 76)

Rugby union career
Amateur team(s)
Years	Team	Apps	(Points)
- Waterloo RFC
International career
Years	Team	Apps	(Points)
1975-76	Scotland	5	

Colin Douglas Fisher (born 27 December 1949) is a Scottish Rugby union player and administrator.

He was capped five times between 1975 and 1976 for Scotland. He also played for Waterloo R.F.C. He is the son of Alastair Fisher, who was also capped for Scotland.

He played 7 times for the Scotland, but two of those games were versus Japan and that time that didn't count for a full cap, his other caps came in matches against Australia, England, Ireland, New Zealand and Wales.

After an injury to his left knee cartilage he never returned to training. After retiring he became involved in administration of Rugby and was involved in controversial incidents involving sponsors and drunken behaviour in 2005. he has also been president of Waterloo R.F.C. of Liverpool. He is a chartered surveyor by profession.
