= Matthew Neely (rugby union) =

Rugby union player from Northern Ireland

- Full name: Matthew Robert Neely
- Born: 24 December 1919 Craigs, Ballymena, Ireland
- Died: 19 October 1997 (aged 77)

Rugby union career
- Position: Prop
International career
Years	Team	Apps	(Points)
1947	Ireland	4	(0)

Matthew Robert Neely (24 December 1919 – 19 October 1997) was an Irish international rugby union player.

Born near Ballymena, Neely served as a Surgeon-Lieutenant in the Royal Navy and after being decommissioned played rugby for Collegians. He was capped four times for Ireland in the 1947 Five Nations, playing as a prop. A doctor, Neely was the Principal Registrar at Belfast's Royal Victoria Hospital and was married in 1950 to fellow doctor Jean Stewart.

== See also ==
- List of Ireland national rugby union players
