= Ernest Marriott =

England international rugby union player

- Born: Ernest Edward Marriott; 15 January 1857 Salford
- Died: Unknown
- School: Rugby School

Rugby union career
- Position: Forward
Amateur team(s)
Years	Team	Apps	(Points)
-	Manchester Football Club		
International career
Years	Team	Apps	(Points)
1875	England	1	

Ernest Marriott was a rugby union international who represented England in 1875.

== Early life ==
He was born on 15 January 1857 in Salford, the son of Henry Marriott, Esq. Rowan Lodge, Whalley Range, Manchester. He attended Rugby School.

== Rugby union career ==
Marriott made his international debut and only appearance for England on 13 December 1875 in the match against Ireland match at Rathmines, Dublin. In the only match he played for his national side he was on the winning side.
