= No. 148 Wing RAF =

No. 148 Wing RAF No. 148 Airfield Headquarters RAF No. 148 (Night Fighter) Wing RAF No. 148 (Air Defence Missile) Wing RAF No. 148 (Surface to Air Missile) Wing RAF No. 148 (SAM) Servicing Wing RAF
- Active: February - May 1944; May 1944 - August 1945; May 1960 - May 1964
- Country: United Kingdom
- Branch: Royal Air Force
- Size: Wing
- Part of: Air Defence of Great Britain; RAF Fighter Command; RAF Second Tactical Air Force
- Last base: RAF Church Fenton

Aircraft flown
- Fighter: de Havilland Mosquito; Hawker Typhoon

No. 148 Wing RAF was a formation of the Royal Air Force during the Second World War. It was originally No. 148 Airfield Headquarters before becoming No. 148 (Night Fighter) Wing RAF during May 1944.

== Structure ==
No. 148 Airfield Headquarters RAF

The Airfield Headquarters was formed on 23 February 1944 at RAF Drem within No. 24 Wing RAF controlling No. 29 Squadron RAF and No. 486 Squadron RNZAF.

No. 148 (Night Fighter) Wing RAF

The wing was formed at RAF Wahn, Germany on 1 April 1953 controlling No. 68 Squadron RAF, No. 87 Squadron RAF, No. 17 Squadron RAF and No. 2 Squadron RAF.

No. 148 (Air Defence Missile) Wing RAF

The wing was reformed on 1 May 1960 at RAF North Coates to control three Bristol Bloodhound surface to air missile squadrons.

== See also ==
- List of Wings of the Royal Air Force
