= Richard Osborne (rugby union) =

England international rugby union player

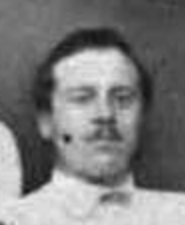
- Born: Richard Robinson Osborne; 20 May 1848 Middleham, Yorkshire
- Died: 4 November 1926 (aged 78) Rochdale, Greater Manchester

Rugby union career
- Position: Fullback
Amateur team(s)
Years	Team	Apps	(Points)
-	Manchester		
International career
Years	Team	Apps	(Points)
1871	England	1	

Richard Osborne (1848-1926) was a rugby union international who represented England in the first international in 1871.

== Early life ==
Richard Osborne was born on 20 May 1848 in Middleham, Yorkshire.

== Rugby union career ==
Osborne made his international debut on 27 March 1871 at Edinburgh in the Scotland vs England match, the first international. He was one of four players from the Manchester Football Club. It was reported that in this match Osborne made an extraordinary charge at Finlay of Scotland. Osborne. Finlay had got well away with the ball, and was sprinting towards the English goal, when Osborne, "folding his arms across his chest, ran full tilt at him, after the fashion of a bull charging a gate. Both were very big, heavy men, and the crash of the collision was tremendous, each reeling some yards, and finally falling on his back. For a few seconds players and spectators alike held their breath, fearing terrible results, but the two giants promptly resumed their places, apparently none the worse." Osborne became the 1st Captain of the Rochdale Hornets Club who formed in August 1871. Rochdale Hornets would later be one of the founding members of the Northern Union which would become the Rugby Football League.
