= Barney Evans =

England international rugby union player

- Full name: Neville Lloyd Evans
- Born: 16 December 1908 Lewisham, London, England
- Died: 27 May 1994 (aged 85) St Austell, England

Rugby union career
- Position: Prop
International career
Years	Team	Apps	(Points)
1932–33	England	5	(0)

Neville Lloyd "Barney" Evans (16 December 1908 – 27 May 1994) was an English international rugby union player.

Evans was born in Lewisham, London, and went to Royal Naval Engineering College.

A Royal Navy lieutenant commander, Evans captained the Devonport Services and the Navy rugby sides. He was capped five times as a prop for England across the 1932 and 1933 Home Nations, debuting against Wales in Swansea. While based in Portsmouth, Evans was a member of Hampshire's 1933 County Championship-winning team, which was their maiden title. He also appeared in county fixtures for Devon.

== See also ==
- List of England national rugby union players
