= Dudley Kemp =

England international rugby union player

- Full name: Dudley Thomas Kemp
- Born: 18 January 1910 Isle of Wight
- Died: January 2003 (aged 92) Torridge, Devon, England
- School: King Edward VI School

Rugby union career
- Position: Back-row
International career
Years	Team	Apps	(Points)
1935	England	1	(0)

Dudley Thomas Kemp (18 January 1910 – January 2003) was an English international rugby union player.

Kemp was born in the Isle of Wight and educated at King Edward VI School, Southampton.

A back-row forward, Kemp won his solitary England cap via Blackheath, playing a 1935 Home Nations match against Wales at Twickenham. He also competed with Trojans and made a county record 51 representative appearances for Hampshire, winning championship titles in 1933 and 1936, the latter as captain.

Kemp served as Rugby Football Union president in 1969 and 1970. He was also a long-serving Hampshire RFU administrator, as team secretary, match secretary, RFU committee representative and president.

== See also ==
- List of England national rugby union players
