= Henry Fry (rugby union) =

England international rugby union player

- Full name: Henry Arthur Fry
- Born: 22 December 1910 West Derby, England
- Died: 3 November 1977 (aged 66) Formby, England
- School: Liverpool College
- Occupation: Solicitor

Rugby union career
- Position: Wing-forward
International career
Years	Team	Apps	(Points)
1934	England	3	(6)

Henry Arthur Fry (22 December 1910 – 3 November 1977) was an English international rugby union player.

== Biography ==
Fry was born in West Derby and attended Liverpool College.

Active in the 1930s, Fry was a wing-forward and once scored five tries from that position in a club match with Waterloo. He was a regular in the Lancashire side from the 1932/33 season. In 1934, Fry gained three England caps in their triple crown winning-Home Nations campaign, contributing two tries in their win over Ireland at Landsdowne Road.

Fry, a solicitor, served as a Royal Army Service Corps officer in World War II and was involved in the Dunkirk evacuation.

== See also ==
- List of England national rugby union players
