= Jim Reeve =

British Lions & England international rugby union player

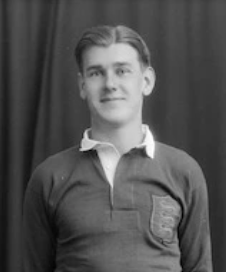
- Full name: James Stanley Roope Reeve
- Born: 12 September 1908 Kensington, London England
- Died: 6 November 1936 (aged 28) East Harling, Norfolk, England
- School: Rugby School
- University: Pembroke College, Cambridge
- Occupation: Barrister

Rugby union career
- Position: Wing
International career
Years	Team	Apps	(Points)
1929–31	England	8	(15)
1930	British Lions	4	(3)

James Stanley Roope Reeve (12 September 1908 – 6 November 1936) was an English international rugby union player.

== Biography ==
The son of a judge, Reeve was born in Kensington and attended Rugby School, before undertaking further studies at Pembroke College, Cambridge. He followed his father into law and became a barrister.

Reeve was a long-striding wing three-quarter who was quick off the mark and played his rugby with Harlequins. He made his England debut in the 1929 Five Nations and featured in all four matches of their championship-winning 1930 campaign, scoring two tries in their tournament opener against Wales. Selected on the 1930 British Lions tour, Reeve played the first Test at Carisbrook and scored the first of his side's two tries to help defeat the All Blacks 6–3, which would be their only win of the series. He featured in a further two matches against the All Blacks, then played the one-off Test in Sydney, and was said to have outpaced Olympic sprinter James Carlton in a fixture against New South Wales.

In 1936, Reeve was killed in a motor accident, at the age of 28.

== See also ==
- List of British & Irish Lions players
- List of England national rugby union players
