= Viv Harrison =

Wales international rugby league footballer

Personal information
- Full name: Vivian Harrison
- Born: 13 November 1921; Neath district, Wales
- Died: August 1989 (aged 67); Redbridge, London, England

Playing information

Rugby union
- Position: Wing, Centre
Club
| Years | Team | Pld | T | G | FG | P |
|---|---|---|---|---|---|---|
| | Chingford RFC |
| ≤1950–≤50 | London Welsh RFC |
| | Total | 0 | 0 | 0 | 0 | 0 |

Rugby league
- Position: Fullback, Centre, Wing, Stand-off
Club
| Years | Team | Pld | T | G | FG | P |
|---|---|---|---|---|---|---|
| 1949–52 | St. Helens | 57 | 20 | 82 | 0 | 224 |
Representative
| Years | Team | Pld | T | G | FG | P |
| 1951 | Wales | 3 |

Vivian "Viv" Harrison (13 November 1921 – August 1989 (aged 67)) was a Welsh rugby union, and professional rugby league footballer who played in the 1940s and 1950s. He played club level rugby union (RU) for Chingford RFC, and London Welsh RFC, as a wing or centre, and representative level rugby league (RL) for Wales, and at club level for St. Helens, as a fullback, centre, wing, or stand-off.

== Background ==
Viv Harrison's birth was registered in Neath district, Wales, he was a teacher, and he died aged 67–68 in Redbridge, London.

== International honours ==
Harrison won 3 caps for Wales in 1951 while at St. Helens.
