= Alun Meredith =

Wales international rugby union player

- Born: 9 November 1919 Ystrad, Wales
- Died: 17 August 2003 (aged 83) Truro, Cornwall, England
- Height: 6 ft 2 in (188 cm)
- School: Pentre Grammar School
- University: University of Bristol
- Occupation: Naval officer

Rugby union career
- Position: Second-row
International career
Years	Team	Apps	(Points)
1949	Wales	3	(3)

Alun Meredith (9 November 1919 — 17 August 2003) was a Welsh international rugby union player.

== Biography ==
Born in Ystrad, Meredith picked up rugby union while at Pentre Grammar School and was a Welsh Public Schoolboys representative player. His military service and studies meant he played the majority of his rugby in England.

Meredith, a 6 ft 2 in second-rower, made the England Universities side while attending the University of Bristol and had a season as captain of Bristol. He represented Devon, Gloucestershire and Yorkshire in county fixtures. At international level, Meredith gained three national caps in the 1949 Five Nations, scoring a try on debut to help defeat England at Cardiff Arms Park, before making further appearances against Scotland and Ireland.

A commander in the Royal Navy, Meredith was head of Navy Sport and Physical Training for the Royal Navy Rugby Union. He also served as the sole team selector and was influential in establishing a colts team. From 1970 to 1973, Meredith held the position of secretary.

== See also ==
- List of Wales national rugby union players
