= George Gibbs (rugby union) =

England international rugby union player

- Full name: George Anthony Gibbs
- Born: 31 March 1920 Carrera, Italy
- Died: 26 February 2001 (aged 80) Bristol, England
- School: Clifton College
- Notable relative: Nigel Gibbs (brother)

Rugby union career
- Position: Prop
International career
Years	Team	Apps	(Points)
1947–48	England	2	(0)

George Anthony Gibbs (31 March 1920 – 26 February 2001) was an English international rugby union player.

Gibbs was a pupil at Clifton College from 1929 to 1938. He gained colours in five different sports and his three years with the first XV included a season as captain. As a soldier with the 44th Royal Tank Regiment, Gibbs served in India and Burma during World War II. He was mentioned in dispatches.

A prop, Gibbs played his early rugby for local sides Bristol United and Imperial, before establishing a place for himself with the Bristol Football Club in 1947. He was capped twice for England, playing home Five Nations fixtures against France in 1947 and Ireland in 1948, with his brother Nigel also later capped as an England fullback.

Gibbs was a good enough cricketer to play for the Gloucestershire Second XI.

== See also ==
- List of England national rugby union players
