= Reg Bazley =

English rugby union player

- Full name: Reginald Charles Bazley
- Born: 15 December 1929 Barrow-in-Furness, England
- Died: 19 November 2009 (aged 79) Liverpool, England

Rugby union career
- Position: Wing
International career
Years	Team	Apps	(Points)
1952–55	England	10	(6)

Reginald Charles Bazley (15 December 1929 – 19 November 2009) was an English international rugby union player.

A native of Barrow, Bazley was a gifted athlete during his youth and played his rugby on the wing.

Bazley competed with Liverpool University and Waterloo, as well as the Army while on national service. He was capped 10 times for England from 1952 to 1955. His two tries against Scotland helped England win their 1953 Calcutta Cup match at Twickenham. He was a County championship winner with Lancashire.

== See also ==
- List of England national rugby union players
