= Roy Foulds =

England international rugby union player

- Full name: Robert Thompson Foulds
- Born: 27 April 1906 West Derby, England
- Died: 28 February 1987 (aged 80) Uckfield, England
- School: King William's College

Rugby union career
- Position: Forward
International career
Years	Team	Apps	(Points)
1929	England	2	(0)

Robert Thompson Foulds (27 April 1906 – 28 February 1987) was an English international rugby union player.

Foulds was born in West Derby, Liverpool, and educated at King William's College on the Isle of Man. He joined Waterloo while still a schoolboy and was a member of their junior sides for several seasons before making the first XV in 1924–25, then progressing into the Lancashire representative team a season later.

A strong scrummager, Foulds was only the second Waterloo forward, after Joe Periton, to gain an England cap. He was capped twice during the 1929 Five Nations. His debut against Wales at Twickenham was as a front-rower and he was moved to the back-row for their match with Ireland at the same ground.

== See also ==
- List of England national rugby union players
