= Reginald Roberts =

England international rugby union & league player

- Full name: Reginald Sidney Roberts
- Born: 4 December 1911 Coventry, England
- Died: May 1992 (aged 80) Coventry, England

Rugby union career
- Position: Hooker
Senior career
Years	Team	Apps	(Points)
1929–33	Coventry		
International career
Years	Team	Apps	(Points)
1932	England	1	(0)
- Rugby league career

Playing information
Club
Years	Team	Pld	T	G	FG	P
1933–35	Huddersfield	65	2			6

Reginald Sidney Roberts (4 December 1911 – May 1992) was an English rugby union player.

A hooker, Roberts played four seasons with his native Coventry, during which time he was a regular member of the Warwickshire representative side, making 20 consecutive appearances. He gained his solitary England cap in their 1932 Home Nations win over Ireland at Lansdowne Road and was an England reserve on five occasions.

Roberts was signed by rugby league club Huddersfield in 1933. He played for the club in their 1935 Challenge Cup final defeat against Castleford.

== See also ==
- List of England national rugby union players
