= Harold Jones (rugby union, born 1904) =

British Lions international rugby union player

- Full name: Harold C. S. Jones
- Born: 10 November 1904
- Died: 23 January 1986 (aged 81)

Rugby union career
- Position: Prop
International career
Years	Team	Apps	(Points)
1930	British Lions		

Harold C. S. Jones (10 November 1904 – 23 January 1986) was an English international rugby union player.

Jones was educated at Trent College and Birkenhead School.

A prop, Jones played his club rugby for Manchester. He was a Lancashire representative player and in 1929 featured on the "Probables" side (against "Possibles") in trials for the England team, but didn't receive a call up. In 1930, Jones went on tour with the British Lions to New Zealand and Australia, as a late replacement after Peter Howard had to withdraw. He played a total of 11 matches over the course of the tour.

== See also ==
- List of British & Irish Lions players
