= Joseph Spencer Stewart =

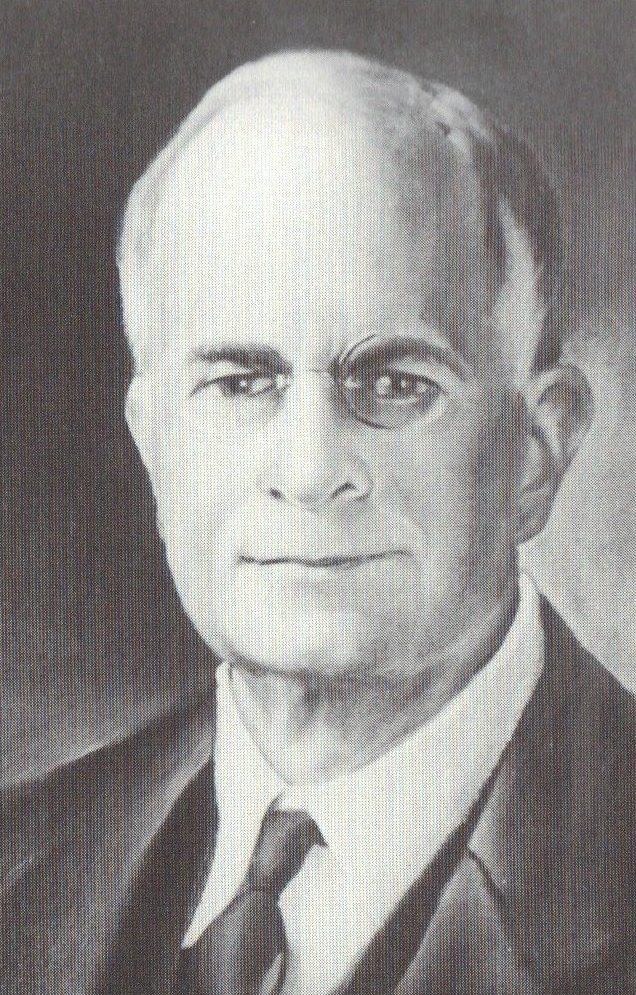

4th President of the University of North Georgia
- In office 1897–1903
- Preceded by: Isaac W. Waddell
- Succeeded by: Edward Spain Avis

Personal details
- Died: 25 March 1934
- Education: Emory College

Joseph Spencer Stewart (1863–1934) was the fourth president of the University of North Georgia.
