= Arthur Rowley (rugby union) =

England international rugby union player

- Full name: Arthur James Rowley
- Born: 18 November 1908 Coventry, England
- Died: 11 April 1995 (aged 86) Solihull, England

Rugby union career
- Position: Wing-forward
International career
Years	Team	Apps	(Points)
1932	England	1	(0)

Arthur James Rowley (18 November 1908 – 11 April 1995) was an English international rugby union player.

Rowley was born in Coventry and attended school in the Stoke area of the city, earning England Schools representative honours. He played his initial rugby after school with Stoke Old Boys.

A wing-forward, Rowley debuted for Coventry RFC in the 1927–28 season. He made 17 appearances with Warwickshire and in 1931 was a member of the side which contested a County Championship final for the first time. In 1932, Rowley gained his solitary England cap against the Springboks at Twickenham, played prior to their Home Nations campaign, for which he lost his place to Eric Coley. His career was subsequently impacted by persistent shoulder problems.

== See also ==
- List of England national rugby union players
