= Flete =

Hamlet in Kent, England

Coordinates: 51.3632°N 1.3704°E

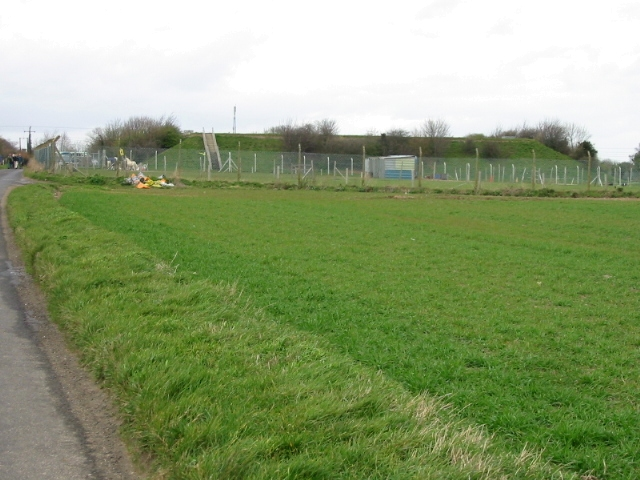
- Reservoir on Preston Road

- Location within Kent
- District: Thanet
- Shire county: Kent
- Region: South East
- Country: England
- Sovereign state: United Kingdom
- Post town: Margate
- Postcode district: CT9
- Police: Kent
- Fire: Kent
- Ambulance: South East Coast
- UK Parliament: Herne Bay and Sandwich

Flete is a hamlet 2 miles (3 km) southwest of Margate in Kent, United Kingdom. It is in the Thanet local government district. At the 2011 census the population of the hamlet was included in the civil parish of Manston.
