= John MacArthur (rugby union) =

Scotland international rugby union player

- Full name: John Parlane MacArthur
- Born: 12 September 1904 West Derby, Liverpool, Lancashire, England
- Died: 1982 (aged 77) Braintree, Essex, England
- School: Ruthin School

Rugby union career
- Position: Scrum-half
International career
Years	Team	Apps	(Points)
1932	Scotland	1	(0)

John Parlane MacArthur (1904 — 1982) was a Scottish international rugby union player.

Born in Liverpool, to Scottish parents, MacArthur learned his rugby at Ruthin School in Wales.

MacArthur joined Waterloo in 1923–24 and three seasons later progressed into the firsts, succeeding F. R. Mitchell-Smith as the new scrum-half. This began his half-back partnership with Steve Meikle, with whom he also combined in regular Lancashire appearances. He declined an invitation to attend England trials, hoping gain a place in the Scotland side, which he finally achieved in 1932. Having been a reserve on six occasions previously, MacArthur gained his solitary Scotland cap in a Calcutta Cup match at Twickenham.

== See also ==
- List of Scotland national rugby union players
