= Tom Price (rugby union, born 1914) =

England international rugby union player

- Full name: Thomas William Price
- Born: 26 July 1914 Gloucester, England
- Died: 11 July 1991 (aged 76) Gloucester, England

Rugby union career
- Position: Prop
International career
Years	Team	Apps	(Points)
1948–49	England	6	(0)

Thomas William Price (26 July 1914 – 11 July 1991) was an English international rugby union player.

A prop, Price debuted for his hometown club Gloucester in 1934 and continued to play for the side until the war, during which turned out for Rotol. He was appointed Gloucester captain for the 1946–47 season and got an opportunity to represent England late in his career, featuring twice in the 1948 Five Nations at the age of 33. In 1949, Price crossed over to the Cheltenham club and won a further four England caps.

Tom Price Close, near the site of the old Cheltenham Athletic Ground, is named in his honour.

== See also ==
- List of England national rugby union players
