= Carlton Troop =

England international rugby union player & RAF officer

Carlton Troop CBE
- Full name: Carlton Lang Troop
- Born: Carlton Lang Troop; 10 June 1910 Malton, Yorkshire, England
- Died: 2 June 1992 (aged 81) Rye, England

Rugby union career
- Position: Forward
International career
Years	Team	Apps	(Points)
1933	England	2	(0)

Group captain Carlton Lang Troop CBE (10 June 1910 – 2 June 1992) was an English international rugby union player.

== Life and career ==
A forward, Troop played his rugby for Aldershot Services, the Army and Harrogate Old Boys. He was capped twice for England in the 1933 Home Nations Championship. On debut against Ireland at Twickenham, Troop was part of an all new back-row, with Ted Sadler and Bill Weston also gaining their first caps. They performed well in an England win and he retained his place for their next fixture against Scotland at Murrayfield.

Troop flew Stirling bombers during World War II and undertook glider towing operations for the No. 38 Group RAF. He was an air attaché in Stockholm before retiring from the RAF in 1960.

== See also ==
- List of England national rugby union players
