= Con Murphy (rugby union, born 1914) =

Irish rugby union player

- Full name: Cornelius Joseph Murphy
- Born: 19 September 1914 Dublin, Ireland
- Died: 9 April 2002 (aged 87)
- School: Catholic University School

Rugby union career
- Position: Fullback
International career
Years	Team	Apps	(Points)
1939–47	Ireland	5	(0)

Cornelius Joseph "Con" Murphy (19 September 1914 — 9 April 2002) was an Irish rugby union international.

Murphy was born in Dublin and educated at Catholic University School.

A fullback, Murphy played his rugby for Lansdowne, debuting as a 19-year old. He gained three Ireland caps in the 1939 Home Nations Championship, before war delayed further appearances. When Ireland returned to Test rugby in 1947, Murphy was appointed captain and led the team for the first two Five Nations matches, including a 22–0 win over England. His individual form however was considered not up to standard and he lost his place to Dudley Higgins for Ireland's remaining matches. He was the only Ireland player to earn caps both sides of the war.

== See also ==
- List of Ireland national rugby union players
