= 1939 Home Nations Championship =

International rugby union competition

- Date: 21 January - 18 March 1939
- Countries: England; Ireland; Scotland; Wales

Tournament statistics
- Champions: England, Ireland and Wales
- Matches played: 6

The 1939 Home Nations Championship was the thirty-fifth series of the rugby union Home Nations Championship. Including the previous incarnations as the Five Nations, and prior to that, the Home Nations, this was the fifty-second series of the northern hemisphere rugby union championship. Six matches were played between 21 January and 18 March. It was contested by England, Ireland, Scotland and Wales.

This was the last tournament that did not feature France, who had been expelled after the 1931 tournament over allegations of professionalism and administrative deficiencies. France would be readmitted later in the year, but the start of World War II in Europe in September put international rugby on hold; it would not resume until 1947. The Calcutta Cup match was the last international game before World War II. Six players who took part in the game would lose their lives during the war, while seven would return to international rugby post-war.

== Participants ==
The teams involved were:

Nation	Venue	City	Captain
England	Twickenham	London	Herbert Toft
Ireland	Lansdowne Road/Ravenhill Stadium	Dublin/Belfast	George Morgan
Scotland	Murrayfield	Edinburgh	Wilson Shaw
Wales	National Stadium	Cardiff	Wilf Wooller

== Table ==
Pos	Team	Pld	W	D	L	PF	PA	PD	Pts
1	Wales	3	2	0	1	18	6	+12	4
1	Ireland	3	2	0	1	17	10	+7	4
1	England	3	2	0	1	12	11	+1	4
4	Scotland	3	0	0	3	12	32	−20	0

== Results ==
21 January 1939

England	3–0	Wales

London

4 February 1939

Wales	11–3	Scotland

Cardiff

11 February 1939

England	0–5	Ireland

London

25 February 1939

Ireland	12–3	Scotland

Dublin

11 March 1939

Ireland	0–7	Wales

Belfast

18 March 1939

Scotland	6–9	England

Edinburgh
