= Alastair Fisher =

Scotland international rugby union player

- Born: Alastair Fisher

Rugby union career
Amateur team(s)
Years	Team	Apps	(Points)
- Waterloo RFC
International career
Years	Team	Apps	(Points)
1947	Scotland	2	

Alastair Fisher was a Scottish rugby union player.

He was capped twice in 1947 for Scotland. He also played for Waterloo R.F.C.

He was the father of Colin Fisher, who was also capped for Scotland.
