= Eddie Richards (rugby union) =

England international rugby union player

Edward Richards
- Full name: Edward Ernest Richards
- Born: 11 March 1905 East Stonehouse, England
- Died: 9 June 1982 (aged 77) Plymouth, England

Rugby union career
- Position: Scrum-half
International career
Years	Team	Apps	(Points)
1929	England	2	(0)

Edward Ernest Richards (11 March 1905 – 9 June 1982) was an English international rugby union player.

A stonemason by profession, Richards played his rugby for Plymouth Albion, Devon and England, for which he was capped twice in the 1929 Five Nations. He was chosen to succeed Arthur Young as England scrum-half for their final two Five Nations fixtures. His half-back partner for both matches were also debutants. He teamed up with Steve Meikle for his debut in a Calcutta Cup match at Murrayfield and then Roger Spong in the side that travelled to Paris.

Richards left rugby union on 1933 to play for the London Highfield in the Northern Rugby Football League.

== See also ==
- List of England national rugby union players
