= Eric Bole =

English rugby union player (1925–1988)

- Born: 30 March 1925 Liverpool, England
- Died: 15 September 1988 (aged 63)
- School: Wycliffe College, Gloucestershire
- University: University of Cambridge
- Occupation: Teacher

Rugby union career
- Position: Forward
International career
Years	Team	Apps	(Points)
- England

Eric Bole (30 March 1925 – 15 September 1988) was an English international rugby union player.

== Early years ==
Bole was born in Liverpool and attended Wycliffe College in Gloucestershire during his youth.

== Rugby career ==
A forward, Bole gained England representative honours when international rugby returned after World War II, featuring in all six of his country's (then) uncapped 1945–46 Victory International fixtures. These have since been upgraded to full internationals. He played rugby during this period for Cambridge University and achieved the rare feat of twice captaining the XV to wins over the University of Oxford in The Varsity Matches of 1945 and 1947. Completing a master's degree in 1948, Bole subsequently took up a teaching position at Liverpool College and played rugby for local side Waterloo. He was also a Lancashire representative player and contributed the winning try in the 1947–48 County Championship final against Eastern Counties, running over fifty yards to score.

== Later life ==
Bole spent the 1950s and 1960s teaching at The Principia, a Christian school in the United States city of St. Louis, which included a period as headmaster. He remained involved in rugby while in St. Louis by refereeing local matches.
