= John Cain (rugby union) =

English rugby union player

- Full name: John Joseph Cain
- Born: 12 June 1920 West Derby, Liverpool, Lancashire, England
- Died: 26 October 1994 (aged 74) Sefton, Merseyside, England
- School: St Mary's College

Rugby union career
- Position: Wing-forward
International career
Years	Team	Apps	(Points)
1950	England	1	(0)

John Joseph Cain (12 June 1920 - 26 October 1994) was an English international rugby union player.

Born in West Derby, Cain played his pre-war rugby in the St Mary's College (Crosby) XV and with Hightown.

Cain, a pacy wing-forward, joined Waterloo in 1947. He made over 50 appearances for Lancashire, playing in their 1947 and 1949 County Championship-winning sides. In 1950, Cain was capped for England in a Five Nations match against Wales at Twickenham. He captained Waterloo during the early 1950s.

== See also ==
- List of England national rugby union players
