= Harold Boughton =

England international rugby union player (1910-1986)

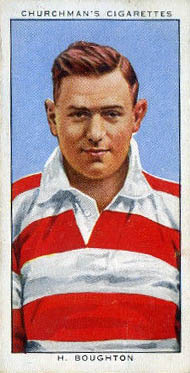
- Full name: Harold John Boughton
- Born: 7 September 1910 Gloucester, England
- Died: July 1986 (aged 75) Bristol, England
- School: Archdeacon School
- Occupation: Bus driver

Rugby union career
- Position: Fullback
Senior career
Years	Team	Apps	(Points)
1927–46	Gloucester	335	(1,258)
International career
Years	Team	Apps	(Points)
1935	England	3	(14)

Harold John Boughton (7 September 1910 – July 1986) was an English international rugby union player.

Born and raised in Gloucester, Boughton was educated at Archdeacon School and in 1925 captained an England schoolboys representative side to a win over Wales schoolboys.

Boughton was a prolific goal-kicking fullback with Gloucester and gained three England caps in the 1935 Home Nations Championship. On debut against Wales, Boughton kicked a penalty goal inside the final ten minutes, to secure a 3-3 draw. He slotted three penalties and one conversion in their win over Ireland, then failed to register a score in their loss to Scotland, although the shots he missed were from difficult angles.

Continuing with Gloucester until 1946, Boughton held the club captaincy for his last full season in 1945-46. He retired having accumulated 1,258 points for the club, scoring over 100 points a season on six occasions.

Boughton was a bus driver by profession and for away matches would sometimes drive the Gloucester team bus.

== See also ==
- List of England national rugby union players
