= Leslie Gracie =

Scotland international rugby union player & British Army officer

Leslie Gracie OBE MC
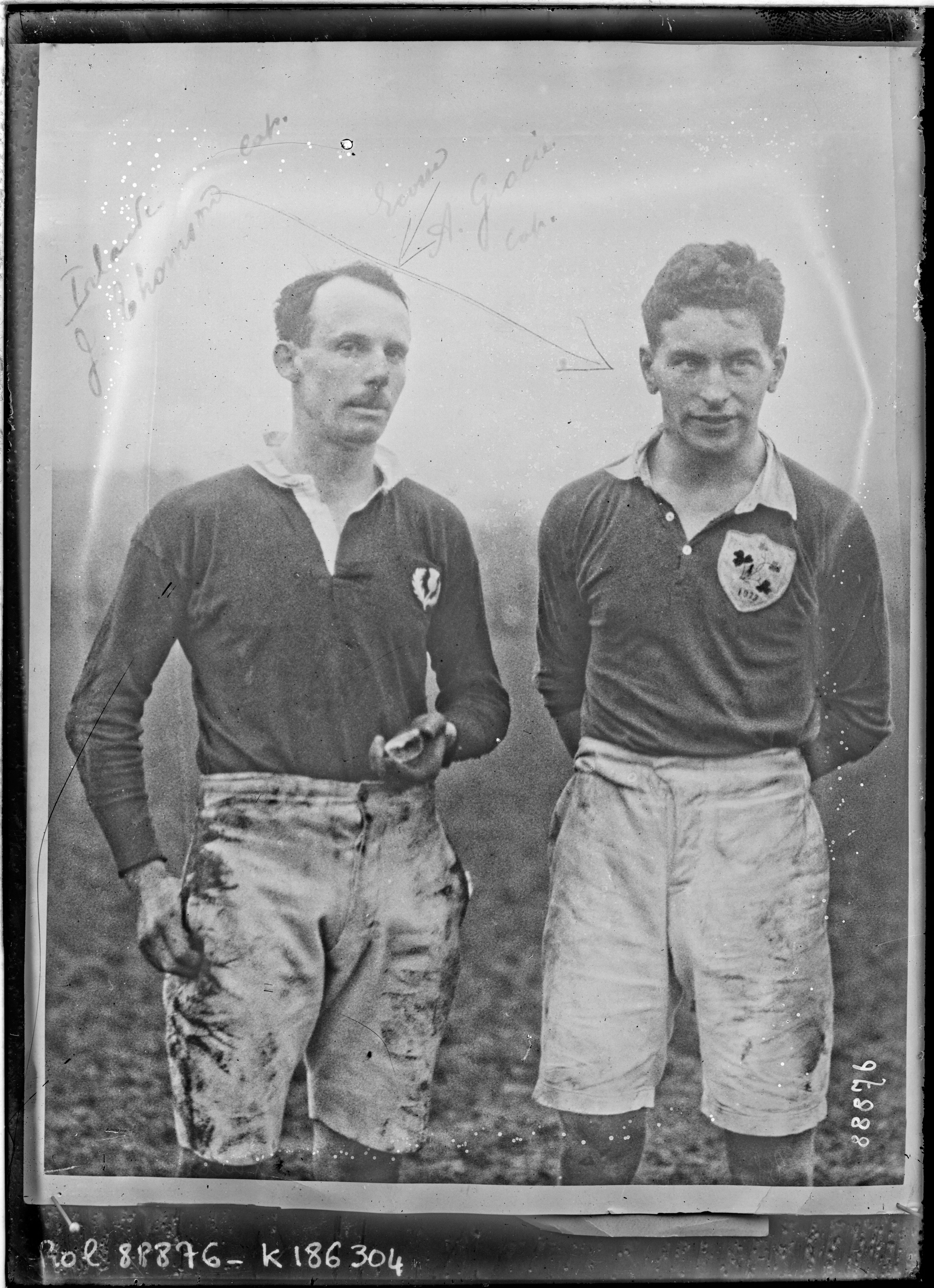
- Gracie and Joe Thomson in 1923
- Full name: Archibald Leslie Gracie
- Born: 15 October 1896 Colombo, Ceylon
- Died: 2 August 1982 (aged 85) Northampton, England
- School: Eltham College
- University: Jesus College, Oxford

Rugby union career
- Position: Centre
International career
Years	Team	Apps	(Points)
1921–24	Scotland	13	(6)

Lieutenant colonel Archibald Leslie Gracie (15 October 1896 — 2 August 1982) was a British Army officer and Scotland international rugby union player of the 1920s.

Gracie was born in Colombo, Ceylon. His father, a missionary from Ayrshire, was in Ceylon as secretary to the British and Foreign Bible Society. He attended Eltham College and Jesus College, Oxford. In World War I, Gracie was commissioned into the King's Royal Rifle Corps. He was awarded a Military Cross while serving on the Western Front.

A centre, Gracie played rugby for Harlequins after being demobilised and gained 13 Scotland caps from 1921 to 1924, having previously declined an offer to be an England reserve. He scored two tries for Scotland, including the match-winner against Wales at Cardiff in the 1923 Five Nations.

== See also ==
- List of Scotland national rugby union players
