= Joe Stewart (rugby union) =

Rugby union player from Northern Ireland

- Full name: William Joseph Stewart
- Born: 24 September 1900 Boghill, Coleraine, Ireland
- Died: 1 February 1959 (aged 58) Stalmine, Lancashire, England
- Occupation: Doctor

Rugby union career
- Position: Fullback
International career
Years	Team	Apps	(Points)
1922–29	Ireland	10	(0)

William Joseph Stewart (24 September 1900 — 1 February 1959) was an Irish international rugby union player.

Raised in Coleraine, County Londonderry, Stewart attended Coleraine Academical Institution and studied medicine at Queen's University Belfast. He was a fullback, capped 10 times for Ireland through the 1920s. His career included a period in England, where he played for the Preston Grasshoppers and Lancashire.

Stewart, a doctor, worked in British India with the Indian Medical Service from 1933 until independence in 1947, then had a general practice for a number of years in the Lancashire district of Over Wyre.

== See also ==
- List of Ireland national rugby union players
