= Humphrey Luya =

England international rugby union player

- Full name: Humphrey Fleetwood Luya
- Born: 3 February 1918 West Derby, Liverpool, England
- Died: 9 May 2008 (aged 90) Steeton, West Yorkshire, England

Rugby union career
- Position: Lock
International career
Years	Team	Apps	(Points)
1948–49	England	5	(0)

Humphrey Fleetwood Luya (3 February 1918 – 9 May 2008) was an English international rugby union player.

Luya was born in West Derby, Liverpool, and educated at Merchant Taylors' Boys' School.

After joining the Royal Artillery in 1939, Luya served in North Africa during the early stages of World War II. He was captured in 1941 while fighting in Crete and held at the Stalag XVIII-A prisoner of war camp outside Wolfsburg, Austria, before being transferred to Oflag IX-A/H in central Germany. With Russian troops advancing in 1945, Luya and his fellow prisoners were marched out of camp by the Germans and he made a successful escape by bolting into the woods, along with Lieutenant Colonel George Kennard. They were discovered two-days later by American soldiers, who needed to be talked out of shooting the two blond-haired Britons, having initially believed they were Germans in disguise.

Luya, a Waterloo player both sides of the war, was in the Lancashire-Cheshire representative side which defeated the 1947–48 Wallabies tourists and gained his first England call up for the 1948 Five Nations, replacing former captain Joe Mycock. A lock, Luya was capped five times for England, all in Five Nations fixtures. He had two years as captain of Leeds club Headingley and won three County Championships with Lancashire.

== See also ==
- List of England national rugby union players
