= Maurice McCanlis =

England international rugby union player & cricketer

Personal information
- Full name: Maurice Alfred McCanlis
- Born: 17 June 1906; Quetta, Baluchistan, British India
- Died: 27 September 1991 (aged 85); Pershore, Worcestershire, England
- Batting: Right-handed
- Bowling: Right-arm medium
- Role: Bowler

Domestic team information
- Years: Team
- 1925–1928: Oxford University
- 1926–1927: Surrey
- 1929: Gloucestershire
- 1938/39–1939/40: Rajputana

Career statistics
Competition	First-class
Matches	30
Runs scored	493
Batting average	15.40
100s/50s	0/0
Top score	40*
Balls bowled	5,367
Wickets	82
Bowling average	32.21
5 wickets in innings	4
10 wickets in match	0
Best bowling	5/42
Catches/stumpings	19/–
- Source: CricketArchive, 8 October 2022

Maurice Alfred McCanlis (17 June 1906 – 27 September 1991) was an English sportsman who played first-class cricket for Oxford University and represented England at rugby union.

Educated at Cranleigh School and St Edmund Hall, Oxford, McCanlis bowled right-arm medium pace and was noted for his out swinging deliveries to right-handers. Most of his first-class matches were with Oxford University and he captained them in the 1928 University Match. He also played two matches for Surrey and one for Gloucestershire during his career.

He was capped twice for the England national rugby union team in the 1931 Five Nations Championship, appearing in their games against Ireland and Wales. He played mainly as a three-quarter and also represented Gloucester and Oxford.

In 1938 and 1940 he made a return to cricket with a couple of Ranji Trophy appearances for Rajputana while he was in India on a teaching job. From 1932 to 1966, McCanlis was a teacher at Cheltenham College.
