= Gordon Rimmer =

British Lions & England international rugby union player

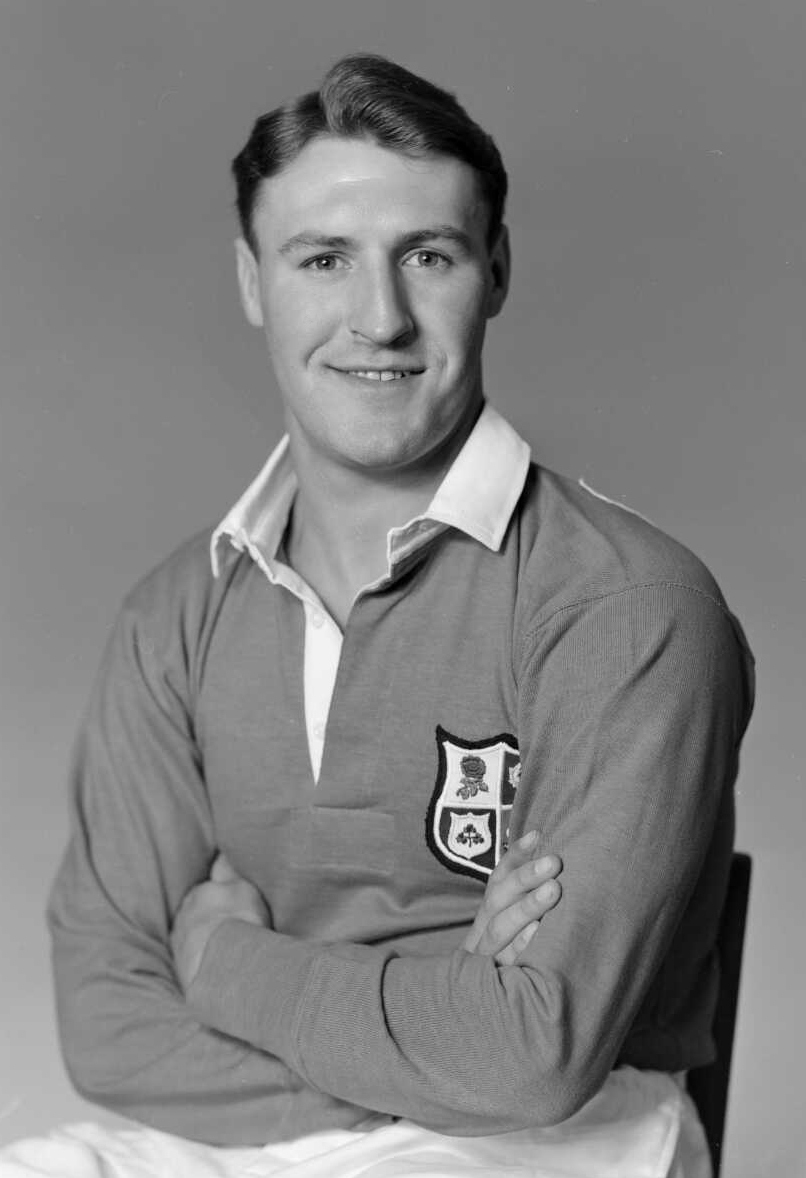
- Rimmer in New Zealand in 1950
- Born: Gordon Rimmer; 28 February 1925 Southport, England
- Died: 2002 (aged 76–77) Sefton, England
- School: King George V School, Southport

Rugby union career
- Position: Scrum-half
Senior career
Years	Team	Apps	(Points)
- Southport RFC
- Waterloo FC
International career
Years	Team	Apps	(Points)
1949–1954	England	12	(0)
1950	British and Irish Lions	1	(0)

Gordon Rimmer (28 February 1925 – 2002) was an English rugby union player who played in the scrum-half position. Rimmer played club rugby with Southport RFC and Waterloo FC, represented Lancashire county, was capped 12 times for England, and was a member of the British Lions team that toured in 1950.

== Rugby career ==
Rimmer played for Southport RFC and Waterloo FC team. He also represented Lancashire in the County Championship, where he played in a record six finals between 1947 and 1955. Rimmer appeared three times for a combined North-Western Counties team against international touring teams, Australia in 1947, South Africa in 1951 and New Zealand in 1954. He also made one appearance for the Barbarians invitational team against East Midlands in 1951.

Rimmer made his England national team début against Wales in Cardiff during the 1949 Five Nations Championship. He made a further appearance against Ireland, but didn't feature in the games against France and Scotland. His first appearance for England at home in Twickenham came the following year, against Wales.

Rimmer was one of only three English players to be included in the British Lions' 1950 tour to New Zealand and Australia. He played in a total of eight games on tour, including one of the test matches against New Zealand, with the other seven appearances against local opposition. In one of these provincial matches, Rimmer played in the fly-half position, making him the only scrum-half to play out of position during a Lions since 1930.

Following his tour with the Lions, Rimmer played three of England's four matches in the 1951 Five Nations Championship. In 1952, Rimmer played in the Five Nations match against Wales and also in the match against South Africa as part of their tour. He did not feature for England in 1953, but returned the following year to play in three of England's games during the 1954 Five Nations Championship, winning all three matches which led to them sharing the Championship title with France and Wales. The game against Scotland was to be his last for the national team.
