= Alfred Carpenter (rugby union) =

English rugby union player

- Full name: Alfred Denzel Carpenter
- Born: 23 July 1900 Abenhall, England
- Died: 18 April 1974 (aged 73) Gloucester, England

Rugby union career
- Position: Front-row
International career
Years	Team	Apps	(Points)
1932	England	1	(0)

Alfred Denzel Carpenter (23 July 1900 – 18 April 1974) was an English international rugby union player.

Born in Abenhall, Gloucestershire, Carpenter was known by the nickname "Bumps" and worked as a coal miner.

Carpenter, primarily a hooker, started out playing for Cinderford. He began his career with Gloucester in 1928 and remained with the club until the war. In 1932, Carpenter was capped for England in a match against the Springboks at Twickenham, becoming the first English player from the Forest of Dean. He won four County Championships representing Gloucestershire and in 1937 toured Wales with the Barbarians.

== See also ==
- List of England national rugby union players
