= Don Burland =

English rugby union player

- Full name: Donald William Burland
- Born: 22 January 1908 Bristol, England
- Died: 26 January 1976 (aged 68) St Austell, England

Rugby union career
- Position: Centre
International career
Years	Team	Apps	(Points)
1931–33	England	8	(23)

Donald William Burland (22 January 1908 – 26 January 1976) was an English international rugby union player.

Burland was born in Bristol and educated at Kingsholme School in Weston-super-Mare. He played soccer during his early years, until taking up rugby union when he moved to the Bristol suburb of Horfield at age 14 and joined a local church side. Three years later was invited to play for Bristol "A".

A centre three-quarter, Burland played in the firsts for Bristol from 1926 to 1934. He was a member of the Gloucestershire side which won three consecutive County Championships during the early 1930s and won eight England caps, debuting in the 1931 Five Nations. His England career included a match against Ireland at Lansdowne Road, where he scored all of England's points in a 11–8 win, with a converted try and two penalties. After two seasons as captain of Bristol, Burland dislocated a shoulder playing against Aldershot Services in 1934, an injury which prematurely ended his career at 26. He scored 118 tries from his 194 appearances for Bristol.

Burland's half-brother, the son of Bristol City goalkeeper Harry Clay, died in the sinking of the HMS Courageous.

== See also ==
- List of England national rugby union players
