= Leslie Saxby =

England international rugby union player

- Full name: Leslie Eric Saxby
- Born: 19 May 1900 Bradfield, Berkshire, England
- Died: 26 August 1956 (aged 56) High Flats, Natal, South Africa

Rugby union career
- Position: Back-row / Centre
International career
| Years | Team | Apps | (Points) |
| 1932 | England | 2 | (0) |

Leslie Eric Saxby (19 May 1900 – 26 August 1956) was an English international rugby union player.

Born in Bradfield, Berkshire, Saxby started his career with Hereford and was initially a centre three-quarter, in which position he also represented North Midlands. He switched to the back-row after crossing to Gloucester.

Saxby won his England call up in 1932 on the back of his performance captaining a combined Gloucestershire and Somerset side against the touring 1931-32 Springboks. Invited to the England trials, Saxby was given the captaincy of "The Rest" and led them to victory, to earn a debut against the Springboks at Twickenham. He gained a second cap in England's 1932 Home Nations opener against Wales in Swansea. Later that year, Saxby captained Gloucestershire to their third successive County Championship title.

== See also ==
- List of England national rugby union players
