= Dickie Guest =

England international rugby union player & British Army officer

- Full name: Richard Heaton Guest
- Born: 12 March 1918 Prescot, England
- Died: May 2012 (aged 94)

Rugby union career
- Position: Wing
International career
Years	Team	Apps	(Points)
1939–49	England	13	(15)

Richard Heaton Guest (12 March 1918 – May 2012) was an English international rugby union player.

Born in Prescot, Guest was educated at Cowley School, St Helens, and Liverpool University.

Guest, a Waterloo winger, was still a teenager when he made his representative debut for Lancashire and won the first of his four County titles in 1938, on his 20th birthday.

In 1939, Guest broke into the England line up, featuring on the wing in all three of their Home Nations matches.

Guest served as a Royal Artillery captain during World War II and in 1942 was attached to the Sudan Defence Forces.

From 1947 to 1949, Guest was capped a further nine times for England, making him one of only three to have represented the team both sides of the war, along with Jack Heaton (his cousin) and Tommy Kemp).

Guest was an England selector between 1963 and 1966.

== See also ==
- List of England national rugby union players
