= Waterloo F.C. =

English rugby union club, based in Merseyside

Coordinates: 53.494518°N 3.047097°W

(England) Waterloo
- Full name: Firwood Waterloo Rugby Club
- Union: Lancashire RFU
- Founded: 1882; 144 years ago
- Location: Blundellsands, Merseyside, England
- Ground(s): St Anthony's Road, Blundellsands (Capacity: 9,950 (950 seats))
- President: Paul Weare
- Coach: Sean Fletcher
- League: Regional 2 North West
- 2025–26: 9th
Team kit

Official website
- firwoodwaterloorfc.rfu.club

Waterloo Rugby Club (known as Firwood Waterloo for sponsorship reasons) is an English rugby union team based at St Anthony's Road, Blundellsands, Merseyside. Once a powerhouse of the English rugby union game, the men's 1st XV now play in Regional 2 North West at the sixth level of English rugby union system, following their relegation from National League 3 North at the end of the 2016–17 season.

== History ==
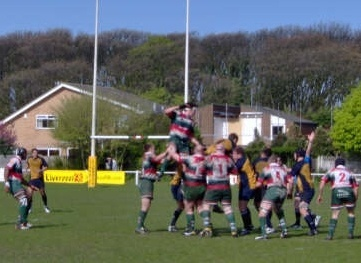
Waterloo lineout at Blundellsands

Waterloo Football Club celebrated its 125th season in 2007–08, having been founded in 1882 by brothers Sidney and Harry Hall and George Abercrombie. From 1882 until 1884 the club was known as Serpentine after the road near its original ground. In 1884 a dispute prompted a relocation to Waterloo and so the club's name was changed. The club returned to the Blundellsands area in 1892 and has remained there ever since. The team is currently known as Firwood Waterloo after its title sponsor.

They play in myrtle green, white and scarlet hooped shirts, green shorts and green socks. Their badge features a Lancastrian red rose with a black griffin in the centre. Former players include Dick Greenwood, Ben Kay, Will Greenwood, Andy Titterrell, Nicola Mazzucato, Watcyn Thomas, Kyran Bracken, Austin Healey, and Paul Grayson.

== Notes ==
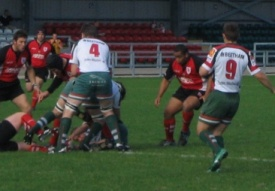
Waterloo ruck Blundellsands.

- In 1977 they were the runner-up in the John Player Cup.
- In 1986 they won the Glengarth Sevens at Stockport RUFC
- They competed in the top division of English rugby for the first two seasons after the league structure was introduced but were relegated in 1989.
- In Season 2003–04 the 1st XV gained promotion to National League Division 2, reached the final of the Powergen Shield at Twickenham and was Rugby World Magazine 'Team of the Year'.
- In 2005–06 they secured promotion to National League Division 1.
- In 2005 club president and former England women's rugby union international Gill Burns received an M.B.E. for services to sport.
- In 2008 the club won the Lancashire Cup for the 7th time.

== Honours ==
- Lancashire Cup winners (7 times): 1974, 1980, 1985, 1987, 1993, 1994, 2008
- Lancashire Cup runner-up: 2006, 2023
- John Player Cup runner-up: 1977
- Glengarth Sevens winners: 1986
- Merit Table B champions: 1986–87
- National Division 3 North champions: 2003–04
- Powergen Shield runner-up: 2003–04

== Ground move ==
At the 2008 AGM the prospect of selling their Blundellsands ground and relocation to a new purpose-built facility was discussed.

== MyWaterlooRugby.com ==
In mid-2009 in an attempt to create extra interest and revenue Waterloo embarked on an internet based fan management scheme allowing rugby enthusiasts to contribute to the running of the club by subscribing to a website and voting on club decisions.

== Women's rugby ==
The women's first team currently play in Tyrells Premier 15s and the Development Team play in the Tyrells Premier 15's Development League. They are currently captained by Rachael Thomas, the section has produced numerous International players throughout their 30-year history and currently have Mhairi Greave (Scotland), Lisa Neumann (Wales), Lauren Delaney (Ireland) and Sarah Beckett (England), playing at International level.

== Colts ==
Waterloo FC has a history of high success at Colts level. The most successful team, captained by Tom Benbow and featuring long serving veterans Tom White Jr, Matt Daley, Sean Miller, Martin Bell, Andrew Riley and Mike Bates won their league in the 2002–03 season, gaining promotion and then winning the Lancashire Cup the following season. The team has now largely disbanded and the majority of the members have moved from the club. Martin Bell went on to become first team captain.

The Colts currently compete in the Senior B league of the Lancashire Colts section (a division also featuring Liverpool St Helens, Kirkby Lonsdale and Fylde). They are captained by Jack Weare who is deputising for the injury stricken Carl Nolan. The season started well with the team winning 6 out of 6 games leaving them top of the table but shortly after this injuries and player availability contributed to the team losing the majority of their matches within weeks of the season opening.

In 2022 the Senior colts won the Lancashire Cup in a 22–17 win over a Warrington side at Fleetwood RUFC. This side was unbeaten in over four years and coached by former Waterloo men's Captain David Blyth.

== Internationals ==
The full list of Waterloo players to earn international caps is as follows :

England : Alan Ashcroft 1956–59, Jasper Bartlett 1951, Reg Bazley 1952–55, Norman Bennett 1948, Eric Bole 1946, John Cain 1950, Roy Foulds 1929, Dick Greenwood 1966–69, Dickie Guest 1939–49, Jack Heaton 1935–47, Chris Jennins 1967, Roy Leyland 1935, Humphrey Luya 1948–49, Graham Meikle 1934, Steve Meikle 1929, Joe Periton 1925–30, Sam Perry 1948, Gordon Rimmer 1949–54, Jim Syddall 1982–84, Peter Thompson 1959, Bert 'HB' Toft 1936–39, Dick Uren 1948–52, Harold Uren 1946, Jack Wallens 1927, Bob Weighill 1947–48, Gill Burns, Sonia Harris, Ross Green 2007

Ireland : Robin Godfrey 1954, Fiona Neary, Joleen Morton

Italy : Nicola Mazzucato 2007.

Spain : Pablo Feijóo 2007–08, Jaime Nava 2008.

Scotland : Alastair Fisher 1947, Colin Fisher 1975–76, John MacArthur 1932, Sammy McQueen 1923, Allan Roy 1938–39, Jumbo Scott 1928–30, Ally Little 2001.

Wales : Raymond Bark-Jones 1933, Watcyn Thomas 1931–33, Kylie Wilson, Rachel Brown, Jennifer Davies.

USA : Michael Caulder 1974–75 Chad Erskine 2006

Canada : Ander Monro 2006

Malta : James O'Brien 2009–present Tom Holloway 2010–present

Luxembourg : Jason Bloomfield 1995 Jason Brittin 1995

Kenya : William Murphy 2009–present

== Other ==
- They were affiliated with Liverpool's Capital of Culture 2008 promotions (official website).
- The club has a long tradition of rivalries with some of the sport's most famous clubs. One such tradition, recently revived, is the game against Wanderers. The winners of this match get to keep the "Percy the Pike" trophy in their clubhouse. The fixture was played once again in April 2017 at St. Anthony's Road. It was indeed won in true "hands will do it" fashion by Wanderers in the last play of the game. The pike will return to Wanderers where it will be played for in a return fixture in 2018.
