= Henry Toft =

England international rugby union player

H B Toft
- Born: Herbert Toft; 2 October 1909 Salford, Greater Manchester
- Died: 7 July 1987 (aged 77) (registered in) Chichester
- School: Manchester Grammar School
- University: Manchester University
- Occupation: [Headmaster and Captain of England's Rugby Team]

Rugby union career
- Position: Hooker
International career
Years	Team	Apps	(Points)
1936-1939	England	10	(Pts:0; Tries:0; Conv:0; Pens:0; Drop:0)

Herbert Toft (1909–1987), known as H. B. Toft, Henry Toft, or Bert Toft, was a rugby union international who represented England from 1936 to 1939. He also captained his country.

== Early life ==
Hebert Toft was born on 2 October 1909 in Salford. He attended Manchester Grammar School and then Manchester University, returning to his school to become a teacher and later headmaster. Born Herbert Toft, he was known by a number of variations on this. Although named Herbert, by the time he was at university he was known as Henry. One explanation of why he then became known as H B Toft was that when it became apparent that of the founders of the Manchester XXI Club he was the only one with one forename, they rechristened him Henry "Bloody" Toft. However, he had also been known as Bert due to a foreshortening of his birth name. This was combined with his nickname Henry such that he became known as Henry Bert Toft, and thence H B Toft. So ubiquitous was the use of Henry Bert Toft as his name that some commentators on the sport cite Henry Bert as his forenames.

== Rugby union career ==
Toft played for Sale Rugby Club and made his international debut on 21 March 1936 at Twickenham in the England vs Scotland match. Of the 10 matches he played for his national side he was on the winning side on 7 occasions. He played his final match for England on 18 March 1939 at Murrayfield in the Scotland vs England match. His rugby career was interrupted by World War II when he left to serve in the Royal Air Force.
