= Joe Periton =

England international rugby union player

- Born: Harold Greaves Periton; 8 March 1901 Belfast, Ireland
- Died: April 1980 (aged 78–79) (registered in) Westminster

Rugby union career
- Position: Flanker
International career
Years	Team	Apps	(Points)
1925–1930	England	21	(Pts:18; Tries:6; Conv:0; Pens:0; Drop:0)

Joe Periton (1901–1980) was a rugby union international who represented England from 1925 to 1930. He also captained his country.

== Early life ==
Joe Periton was born on 8 March 1901 in Belfast, Ireland but brought up in Crosby, Merseyside.

== Rugby union career ==
Periton made his international debut on 17 January 1925 at Twickenham in the England vs Wales match. Of the 21 matches he played for his national side he was on the winning side on 12 occasions. He played his final match for England on 15 March 1930 at Twickenham in the England vs Scotland match.
