= Steve Meikle =

England international rugby union player

- Full name: Stephen Spencer Churchill Meikle
- Born: 6 July 1905 West Derby, England
- Died: 4 June 1960 (aged 54) Liverpool, England
- Notable relative: Graham Meikle (brother)

Rugby union career
- Position: Stand-off
International career
Years	Team	Apps	(Points)
1929	England	1	(3)

Stephen Spencer Churchill Meikle (6 July 1905 – 4 June 1960) was an English international rugby union player.

Born in West Derby, Liverpool, Meikle was the elder brother of England wing three-quarter Graham Meikle and joined his local side Waterloo at age 18. His solitary England cap came as a stand-off in a 1929 Calcutta Cup match against Scotland at Murrayfield, forming a partnership with fellow debutant Eddie Richards.

Meikle was managing director of a ship painting company and served as a Lancashire selector. He died of carbon monoxide poisoning in his car in 1960 at the age of 54. A verdict of suicide was recorded by the coroner.

== See also ==
- List of England national rugby union players
