= Joe Mycock =

England international rugby union player

- Born: Joeseph S. Mycock; 17 January 1916 Bakewell, England
- Died: 30 May 2004 (aged 88) Aberconwy, Wales
- School: Giggleswick School

Rugby union career
- Position(s): Lock; Number 8
Amateur team(s)
Years	Team	Apps	(Points)
- Sale
–	Vale of Lune		
–	Harlequin F.C.		
–	RAF		
–	Combined Services		
–	British Empire Forces		
–	Barbarian F.C.		
International career
Years	Team	Apps	(Points)
1947–1948	England	5	(0)

Joseph Mycock (17 January 1916 – 30 May 2004) was an English rugby union player who once captained the England national team. At club level, he represented Sale.

== Playing career ==
Mycock captained Sale Rugby Club on 29 May 1936. Mycock said one of his principal aims would be to strengthen the junior teams and try to bring on the club's own players. He joined Harlequins on 5 December 1936. He was first selected for England on 7 January 1939/ playing at Number 8.

He was later capped for England against the 1947 Australia tourists. It is suggested that he was the first captain to remove forwards from the line and put them in the backs. On 11 November 1944, he captained the Combined Services.
