= Manchester Rugby Club =

English rugby union club

(England) Manchester
- Full name: Manchester Rugby Club
- Union: Lancashire RFU
- Founded: 1860; 166 years ago
- Location: Cheadle Hulme, Stockport, England
- Ground: Grove Park (Capacity: 4,000 (250 seats))
- Chairman: Tim Holmes
- Coach(es): James Beane, (Director of Men’s Rugby), Marshal Gadd (Senior Men's Head Coach), Maggie Forbes (Senior Women's Head Coach)
- Captain(s): Men First XV: Charlie Ding; Women First XV: Emily Houghton
- League(s): Regional 1 North West (Men); Championship North 2 (Women)
- 2024–25: 3rd (men’s)
Team kit

Official website
- manchesterrugby.co.uk

Manchester Rugby Club, founded in 1860 as Manchester Football Club, is one of the oldest rugby union clubs in the world. Home matches are played at Grove Park in Cheadle Hulme, Stockport.

The club has a Senior Men's section (1st XV, 2nd XV and 3rd XV), a Senior Women and Youth Girls section (Manchester Women & Girls' Academy), and also Minis, Juniors and Colts (Manchester Academy). The club's home colours are red and white narrow hooped shirts, white shorts and red and white hooped socks. Away colours are navy shirts with red piping, navy shorts and navy socks. The men's 1st XV currently play in Regional 1 North West, the fifth tier of the English rugby union system. The Women's 1st XV compete in Championship North 2, in the third tier of the English rugby union system.

== History ==
Although officially founded in 1860 as Manchester Football Club, a Manchester team actually first played in 1857, when the Gentlemen of Manchester and the Gentlemen of Liverpool came together to play a friendly game. Richard Sykes, a former Captain of Football at Rugby School set up the Manchester team and provided the ball. The game was advertised as "Rugby versus the World" and some fifty players arrived to play. There is no record of the score, however it appears that five tries were scored and so there must have been a winner.

Liverpool FC, who later merged with St Helens RUFC to form Liverpool St. Helens F.C, came into being not long afterwards. It is not known why Manchester did not also form at this date but the Liverpool and St Helens clubs' merger in 1986 left Manchester as one of the oldest rugby clubs in the world.

From 1919 until 1968 the club's home ground was at Moor Lane on Kersal Moor, now the home of Salford City F.C.

Manchester had very strong links with the early RFU, with two former presidents of MFC also taking the same office as President of the RFU (James MacLaren 1882–1884 and Roger Walker) 1894–1896. Other members who have been President of the RFU are J.W.H.Thorpe (1898–1900), James Milnes (1934), J.Reg.Locker (1967) and Dr.T.A.Kemp, MD, FRCP (1971). The club has provided a number of international players since 1871. The club provided four England players in the world's first ever international match against Scotland in 1871 (Richard Osborne, William MacLaren, Arthur Sumner Gibson and H.J.C. Turner). Another former player was Albert Neilson Hornby, the first ever player to captain England at both rugby and cricket. The earliest international jersey is still on display in the clubhouse. Andrew Bulteel and Ernest Marriott both played for England in the last 20 a-side match against Ireland in 1875.

Manchester FC were also the first recognised association football side in Manchester. In 1894 Newton Heath (present day Manchester United) were banned from changing their name to Manchester FC by the FA and RFU because of the existence of the rugby side. The full story of Manchester FC's association football history is detailed in Manchester A Football History where it is revealed they hold many Mancunian firsts, though the side that played Queen's Park Scotland in 1883, losing 15-0 were not Manchester FC, but their local rivals Manchester Association.

Manchester Rugby Club are the current holders of the unenviable record of the longest ever losing streak in club rugby. The Cheshire-based rugby union Men's side finally laid to rest the ‘record breaking’ ghost of eighty seven consecutive league losses spanning just more than three years on 24 March 2012. This was following some poor financial decisions by the rugby management, after being promoted to National League One when the club narrowly avoided bankruptcy.

== Manchester Women's Rugby ==
Manchester Women's Rugby was founded at Manchester Rugby Club in 1991 in the year of the first ever Women's Rugby World Cup. The club has gone from strength to strength, rising through the leagues to compete in Championship North 2 in the third tier of the RFU English Rugby Union system. The club has established a Women & Girls' Academy section, offering development and competitive rugby to U13, U15, U18 and Senior Women. Manchester Rubies and Manchester Women front the clubs' competitive squads.

== Men's Honours ==
1st XV:

- Glengarth Sevens Davenport Plate winners: 1974
- North West 2 champions: 1989–90
- North West 1 champions: 1991–92
- North Division 2 champions: 1992–93
- North Division 1 champions: 1995–96
- Lancashire Cup winners (3): 1998, 1999, 2001
- South Lancs/Cheshire 1 2016–17
- North 2 West champions: 2019–20

2nd XV:

- South Lancs/Cheshire 4 champions: 2002–03
- South Lancs/Cheshire 3 champions: 2003–04
- Halbro North West Division 2 South champions: 2022–23

== Members who have been President of the RFU ==
- James Maclaren 1882–84
- Roger Walker 1894–96
- J. W. H. Thorpe 1898–1900
- James Milnes 1934
- J. Reg. Locker 1967
- Dr. T. A. Kemp, MD, FRCP 1971

== International players ==
Opponent: E - England S - Scotland I - Ireland W - Wales NZ - New Zealand F - France A - Australia

- (England) H.J.C. Turner S 1871
- (England) Arthur Sumner Gibson S 1871
- (England) William MacLaren S 1871
- (England) Richard Osborne S 1871
- (England) James Genth S 1874/75
- (England) Roger Walker S 1874/76/79/80 I 1875
- (England) W. H. Hunt S 1876/77 I 1876/78
- (England) Andrew Bulteel I 1876
- (England) Ernest Marriott I 1876
- (Scotland) D. Drew E 1871/1876
- (England) Walter Greg 1876 I 1876
- (England) Robert Todd S 1877
- (England) T. Blatherwick I 1878
- (England) Albert Neilson Hornby S 1877/78/81/82 I 1877/78/80/81/82
- (England) F. D. Fowler S 1878/79
- (England) W. E. Openshaw I 1879
- (Ireland) J. Heron E 1879 S 1877
- (England) Hugh Rowley S 1879/80/81/82 I 1879/80/81/82 W 1881
- (England) W. R. Richardson I 1881
- (England) J. W. Schofield I 1880
- (England) R. Hunt S 1881 I 1880/82 W 1881
- (England) J. T. Hunt S 1881 I 1882/84
- (Wales) Charles Allen E 1884 S 1884
- (England) F. T. Wright S 1881
- (England) J. H. Payne S 1882/83 I 1883/84/85 W 1883/85
- (England) C. Anderton NZ 1889
- (England) F. A. Leslie Jones IW 1895
- (Ireland) D. C. Woods S NZ 1889
- (Scotland) J. E. Orr E 1890/91/92/93 I 1889/90/91/92/93 W 1890/91/92
- (England) E. F. Fookes S 1896/97/99 I 1896/97/98/99 W 1896/97/98
- (Scotland) C. J. Fleming E 1896 I 1896/97
- (England) A. O. Dowson S 1899
- (Scotland) H. Rottenburg E 1899/1900 W 1899/1900 I 1897
- (England) Capt. E. I. M. Barrett S 1903
- (England) Leonard Haigh S 1910/11 I 1910/11 W 1910/11 F 1911
- (England) F. G. Handford SIWF 1909
- (England) C. S. Williams F 1910
- (Ireland) Dr.T. Smyth E 1908/09/10/11/12 W 1908/09/10/11 S 1908/09/10/11 F 1910
- (England) J. A. Schofield W 1911
- (Ireland) W. J. Cullen E 1920
- (England) G. S. Conway S 1920/22/23/24 I 1920/22/23/24 W 1922/23/24/27 F 1920/21/22/23/24 NZ 1925
- (Scotland) Robert Simpson I 1922
- (Scotland) A. L. Gracie I 1921/22/23 E 1921/22/23 W 1921/22/23 F 1921/22/23/24
- (England) B. S. Chantill WESF 1924
- (Scotland) Dr. A. C. Gillies E 1924/25/27 I 1924/27 W 1924/25/26/27 F 1925/26/27
- (England) P. H. Davies I 1927
- (England) Guy Wilson WI 1929
- (England) Dr. T. A. Kemp W 1937/47 I 1937 S 1938 A 1947
- (England) Fred Huskisson S 1936/38 W 1936/37/38 I 1936/37/38
- (Scotland) A. H. Drummond WI 1938
- (England) Robert Carr WIS 1939
- (England) C. B. Holmes S 1947 I 1948 F 1948/1955
- (England) H. Scott F 1955
- (Ireland) Fr. J. M. Cunningham E 1955 F 1955/56 S 1955/56 W 1955/56
- (England) A. B. W. Risman W 1959/61 I 1959/61 S 1959/61 F 1959/61 A 1961
- (England) N. J. Drake-Lee W 1963/64/65 I 1963/64 S 1963 F 1963 NZ 1964
- (England) D. W. A. Rosser W 1965/6 ISF 1965
- (Ireland) B. J. O’Driscoll FESW 1971
- (Ireland) J. O’Driscoll S 1978/80/81/82/83 A 1979 E 1980/81/82/83 F 1980/81/82/83 W 1980/81/82/83
- (Ireland) M. Moylett E 1988

== Captains of Manchester Football Club ==
Senior Men:

- 1860/67 R. Sykes
- 1868 William MacLaren
- 1869/70 W. Grave
- 1871 J. McLaren
- 1872/79 Roger Walker
- 1880/81 Albert Neilson Hornby
- 1882 J. W. Schofield
- 1883 E. Storey
- 1884 J. E. Fletcher
- 1885/87 J. D. Wormaid
- 1888 F. A. Andrew
- 1889/90 A. H. Molesworth
- 1891/92 G. N. M. Cameron
- 1893 D. C. Woods
- 1894 W. B. Steel
- 1895 K. P. Birley
- 1896 W. Parlane
- 1897 W. G. Hogg
- 1898 W. Parlane
- 1899 T. A. Kingscote
- 1900 G. Cookson
- 1901/03 F. J. Milne
- 1904 J. Milnes
- 1905 V. P. Gamon
- 1906 F. I. Dixon
- 1907/08 J. Hunter
- 1909 H. Whitehead
- 1910 L. Haigh
- 1911 H. E. Latham
- 1912 J. Tolson
- 1913 T. Entwisle, J. C. Barrett
- 1919 G. Folds
- 1920 W. Sutcliffe
- 1921 G. Folds
- 1922 W. M. Hoyle
- 1923 H. S. Jones
- 1924 D. Peak
- 1925/27 A. L. Gracie
- 1928/29 Dr. A. C. Gillies
- 1930 L. J. O’Reilly
- 1931 H. C. S. Jones
- 1932 F. Hughes
- 1933/35 T. A. Bell
- 1936 J. M. Lee
- 1937/38 T. A. Bell
- 1939 J. M. Lee
- 1945 G. W. Singleton
- 1946/48 A. G. Komrower
- 1949/50 P. G. Clemence
- 1951/53 A. Ferguson
- 1954/55 P. T. Baines
- 1956 D. Stewart
- 1957 J. E. Cooper
- 1958 P. Batten
- 1959 G. D. Parker, H. Scott
- 1960/62 K. Jones
- 1963 G. St. J. L. Goddard
- 1964 P. D. G. Ross
- 1965/66 Dr. J. B. O’Driscoll
- 1967 M. Wright
- 1968 E. A. Wright
- 1969 W. J. Chadwick
- 1970 D. A. Hancock
- 1971 R. J. K. Newitt
- 1972 N. P. G. Ross
- 1973/74 C. R. Unsworth
- 1975 J. R. Gadd
- 1976 J. Wharton
- 1977 P. Jarvie
- 1978 G. Hughes, L. Sampson
- 1979 L. Sampson
- 1980 C. Hanson
- 1981 S. Bell
- 1982 S. Burnage
- 1983 D. Cotter
- 1984 G. Stewart
- 1985 S. Litster, G. Birch
- 1986 G. Birch
- 1987 R. Smith
- 1988/94 D. A. Kelly
- 1995 A. S. Hanson
- 1996 N. Hitchen, S. Swindells
- 1997/98 S. Swindells
- 1998/2000 S. Swindells
- 2000 G. Gerrard
- 2001/02 D. Mukalt
- 2002/03 A. Aylesbrook
- 2003 M. Armstrong
- 2004 M. Armstrong
- 2005 J. Bramhall
- 2006 J. Bramhall
- 2007 J. Bramhall
- 2008 N. Flynn
- 2009 J. Doney, D. Carlton
- 2010 D. Carlton
- 2011 D. Carlton
- 2012 R. McCartney
- 2013 R. McCartney
- 2014 T. Fantom
- 2015 B. Jenkins
- 2016 K. Higginson

Senior Women:

- 1991 M. Waugh
- 1993 J. Hawkins
- 1994 S. Shotton
- 1995 J. Deakin
- 2007 J. Canner-Farrington
- 2008 A. Wood
- 2011 L. Dudbridge & R. Sallaway
- 2012 H. Gaunt & J. Taylor-Reid
- 2013 R. Prescott & V. Calder
- 2014 K. Bailey
- 2015 A. Smith
- 2016 S. Hobday
- 2017 H. Gaunt & K. Barker
- 2018 E. Gallimore & K. Bailey
- 2019 J. Pugh
- 2020-1 J. Wells
- 2022 E. Houghton
