= Jack Heaton (rugby union) =

England international rugby union player

- Born: John Heaton; 30 August 1912
- Died: October 1998 (aged 85–86) Dwyfor, Wales

Rugby union career
- Position: Centre
International career
Years	Team	Apps	(Points)
1935–1947	England	9	(Pts:17; Conv:4; Pens:3)

Jack Heaton (1912–1998) was a rugby union international who represented England from 1935 to 1947. He also captained his country.

== Early life ==
Jack Heaton was born on 30 August 1912.

== Rugby union career ==
Heaton made his international debut on 19 January 1935 at Twickenham in the England vs Wales match. Of the 9 matches he played for his national side he was on the winning side on 5 occasions. He played his final match for England on 19 April 1947 at Twickenham in the England vs France match.
