= 1970 Five Nations Championship squads =

Rugby union competition squads

These are the 1970 Five Nations Championship squads:

== England ==
Head coach: Don White

1. Mike Bulpitt
2. Tony Bucknall
3. Mike Davis
4. David Duckham
5. Keith Fairbrother
6. Keith Fielding
7. John Finlan
8. Martin Hale
9. Bob Hiller (c.)
10. Barry Jackson
11. Tony Jorden
12. Peter Larter
13. Mike Leadbetter
14. John Novak
15. John Pullin
16. Gerry Redmond
17. Roger Shackleton
18. John Spencer
19. Nigel Starmer-Smith
20. Stack Stevens
21. Bob Taylor
22. Bryan West

== France ==
Head coach: Fernand Cazenave

1. Jean-Louis Azarete
2. Jean-Pierre Bastiat
3. René Benesis
4. Jean-Louis Bérot
5. Pierre Biemouret
6. Jean-Marie Bonal
7. Roger Bourgarel
8. Jack Cantoni
9. Christian Carrère (c.)
10. Elie Cester
11. Benoît Dauga
12. Jean Iraçabal
13. Michel Lasserre
14. Jean le Droff
15. Jean-Pierre Lux
16. Alain Marot
17. Lucien Pariès
18. Michel Pebeyre
19. Marcel Puget
20. Jean Sillières
21. Gérard Sutra
22. Gérard Viard
23. Pierre Villepreux
24. Jean Trillo

== Ireland ==
Head coach: Ronnie Dawson

1. Barry Bresnihan
2. William Brown
3. Alan Duggan
4. Mike Gibson
5. Ken Goodall
6. Ken Kennedy
7. Tom Kiernan (c.)
8. Ronnie Lamont
9. Willie John McBride
10. Barry McGann
11. Syd Millar
12. Mick Molloy
13. Philo O'Callaghan
14. Tony O'Reilly
15. Fergus Slattery
16. Roger Young

== Scotland ==
Head coach: none

1. Rodger Arneil
2. Alastair Biggar
3. Gordon Brown
4. Peter Brown
5. Sandy Carmichael
6. Gordon Connell
7. Tommy Elliot
8. John Frame
9. Sandy Hinshelwood
10. Frank Laidlaw
11. Wilson Lauder
12. Ian McLauchlan
13. Duncan Paterson
14. Chris Rea
15. Ian Robertson
16. Ian Smith
17. Mike Smith
18. Peter Stagg
19. Norm Suddon
20. Jim Telfer (c.)
21. Jock Turner
22. Robert Young

== Wales ==
Head coach: Clive Rowlands

1. Phil Bennett
2. Laurie Daniel
3. Mervyn Davies
4. John Dawes
5. Gareth Edwards (c)
6. Geoff Evans
7. Stuart Gallacher
8. Ian Hall
9. Chico Hopkins
10. Dennis Hughes
11. Barry John
12. Arthur Lewis
13. Barry Llewelyn
14. John Lloyd
15. Roy Mathias
16. Dai Morris
17. Vic Perrins
18. Billy Raybould
19. Jim Shanklin
20. John Taylor
21. Delme Thomas
22. Stuart Watkins
23. Denzil Williams
24. J. P. R. Williams
