= 1969 Five Nations Championship squads =

Rugby union competition squads

These are the 1969 Five Nations Championship squads:

== England ==
1. Timothy Dalton
2. David Duckham
3. Keith Fairbrother
4. Keith Fielding
5. John Finlan
6. Dick Greenwood (c.)
7. Bob Hiller
8. Nigel Horton
9. Peter Larter
10. Ken Plummer
11. Piggy Powell
12. John Pullin
13. Budge Rogers
14. Dave Rollitt
15. John Spencer
16. Bob Taylor
17. Rodney Webb
18. Trevor Wintle

== France ==
Head coach: Fernand Cazenave

1. Jean-Louis Azarete
2. René Benesis
3. Jean-Louis Bérot
4. Pierre Biémouret
5. Jean-Marie Bonal
6. André Campaes
7. Christian Carrère (c.)
8. Élie Cester
9. Benoît Dauga
10. Claude Dourthe
11. Jean-Michel Esponda
12. Jean Gachassin
13. Michel Hauser
14. Jean Iraçabal
15. Claude Lacaze
16. Michel Lasserre
17. Jean-Pierre Lux
18. Jo Maso
19. Basile Moraitis
20. Alain Plantefol
21. Marcel Puget (c.)*
22. Jean Salut
23. Gérard Sutra
24. Christian Swierczinski
25. Walter Spanghero (c.)**
26. Jean Trillo
27. Gérard Viard
28. Michel Yachvili
29. Pierre Villepreux
- captain in the third game
- captain in the fourth game

== Ireland ==
Head coach: Ronnie Dawson

1. Barry Bresnihan
2. Jim Davidson
3. Alan Duggan
4. Mike Gibson
5. Ken Goodall
6. Colin Grimshaw
7. Mike Hipwell
8. Ken Kennedy
9. Tom Kiernan (c.)
10. Willie John McBride
11. Barry McGann
12. Syd Millar
13. Mick Molloy
14. John Moroney
15. Noel Murphy
16. Philo O'Callaghan
17. Harry Rea
18. Roger Young

== Scotland ==
1. Dick Allan
2. Rodger Arneil
3. Colin Blaikie
4. Peter Brown
5. Sandy Carmichael
6. Gordon Connell
7. Tommy Elliot
8. John Frame
9. Sandy Hinshelwood
10. Doug Jackson
11. Frank Laidlaw
12. Wilson Lauder
13. Gordon Macdonald
14. Ian McCrae
15. Alastair McHarg
16. Ian McLauchlan
17. Chris Rea
18. Ian Robertson
19. Peter Stagg
20. Billy Steele
21. Norm Suddon
22. Colin Telfer
23. Jim Telfer (c.)
24. Jock Turner

== Wales ==
Head coach: Clive Rowlands

1. Phil Bennett
2. Gerald Davies
3. Mervyn Davies
4. John Dawes
5. Gareth Edwards (c.)*
6. Keith Jarrett
7. Barry John
8. John Lloyd
9. Dai Morris
10. Brian Price (c.)
11. Maurice Richards
12. John Taylor
13. Brian Thomas
14. Delme Thomas
15. Stuart Watkins
16. Denzil Williams
17. J. P. R. Williams
18. Jeff Young
- captain in the last game
