= 1971 Five Nations Championship squads =

Rugby union competition squads

These are the 1971 Five Nations Championship squads:

== England ==
Head coach: Don White

1. Tony Bucknall (c.)*
2. Fran Cotton
3. Dick Cowman
4. David Duckham
5. Keith Fairbrother
6. Peter Glover
7. Charlie Hannaford
8. Bob Hiller
9. Jeremy Janion
10. Peter Larter
11. Tony Neary
12. Barry Ninnes
13. Jacko Page
14. David Powell
15. John Pullin
16. Peter Rossborough
17. John Spencer (c.)
18. Chris Wardlow
19. Ian Wright
- captain in the first game

== France ==
Head coach: Fernand Cazenave

1. Jean-Louis Azarete
2. Max Barrau
3. Jean-Pierre Bastiat
4. René Benesis
5. Jean-Louis Bérot
6. Roland Bertranne
7. Pierre Biemouret
8. Roger Bourgarel
9. Jack Cantoni
10. Christian Carrère (c.)
11. Benoît Dauga (c.)*
12. Daniel Dubois
13. Marc Etcheverry
14. Jean Iraçabal
15. Michel Lasserre
16. Jean le Droff
17. Jean-Pierre Lux
18. Michel Pebeyre
19. André Quilis
20. Jean Sillières
21. Claude Spanghero
22. Walter Spanghero
23. Jean Trillo
24. Gérard Viard
25. Pierre Villepreux
26. Michel Yachvili
- captain in the first two games

== Ireland ==
Head coach: Ronnie Dawson

1. Barry Bresnihan
2. Alan Duggan
3. Mike Gibson (c.)
4. Edwin Grant
5. Denis Hickie
6. Mike Hipwell
7. Ken Kennedy
8. Tom Kiernan (c.)*
9. Sean Lynch
10. Willie John McBride
11. Barry McGann
12. Ray McLoughlin
13. Mick Molloy
14. Barry O'Driscoll
15. Fergus Slattery
16. Roger Young
- captain in the first game

== Scotland ==
Head coach: Bill Dickinson

1. Rodger Arneil
2. Alastair Biggar
3. Arthur Brown
4. Gordon Brown
5. Peter Brown (c.)
6. Sandy Carmichael
7. Quintin Dunlop
8. John Frame
9. Ronnie Hannah
10. Frank Laidlaw
11. Nairn MacEwan
12. Alastair McHarg
13. Ian McLauchlan
14. Duncan Paterson
15. Chris Rea
16. Brian Simmers
17. Stephen Turk
18. Ian Smith
19. Billy Steele
20. Jock Turner

== Wales ==
Head coach: Clive Rowlands

1. John Bevan
2. Gerald Davies
3. Mervyn Davies
4. John Dawes (c.)
5. Gareth Edwards
6. Ian Hall
7. Barry John
8. Arthur Lewis
9. Barry Llewelyn
10. Dai Morris
11. Mike Roberts
12. John Taylor
13. Delme Thomas
14. Denzil Williams
15. J. P. R. Williams
16. Jeff Young
