= 1967 Five Nations Championship squads =

Rugby union competition squads

These are the 1967 Five Nations Championship squads:

== England ==
1. John Barton
2. Mike Coulman
3. John Finlan
4. Danny Hearn
5. Roger Hosen
6. Christopher Jennins
7. Phil Judd (c.)
8. Colin McFadyean
9. John Pallant
10. Roger Pickering
11. Steve Richards
12. Budge Rogers
13. Dave Rollitt
14. Keith Savage
15. Bob Taylor
16. Dave Watt

== France ==
Head coach: Jean Prat

1. Michel Arnaudet
2. Jean-Claude Berejnoi
3. Jean-Michel Cabanier
4. Guy Camberabero
5. Lilian Camberabero
6. Christian Carrère
7. Élie Cester
8. Benoît Dauga
9. Christian Darrouy (c.)
10. Claude Dourthe
11. Bernard Duprat
12. Jacques Fort
13. Jean Gachassin
14. Arnaldo Gruarin
15. André Herrero
16. Claude Lacaze
17. Jean-Claude Lasserre
18. Jean-Pierre Lux
19. Jo Maso
20. Jean Salut
21. Michel Sitjar
22. Walter Spanghero

== Ireland ==
1. Barry Bresnihan
2. Niall Brophy
3. Mick Doyle
4. Alan Duggan
5. Mike Gibson
6. Ken Goodall
7. Sam Hutton
8. Ken Kennedy
9. Tom Kiernan
10. Sean MacHale
11. Willie John McBride
12. Mick Molloy
13. Al Moroney
14. Noel Murphy (c.)
15. Philo O'Callaghan
16. Des Scott
17. Brendan Sherry
18. Jerry Walsh
19. Roger Young

== Scotland ==
1. Alasdair Boyle
2. Sandy Carmichael
3. David Chisholm
4. Pringle Fisher (c.)
5. Derrick Grant
6. Alex Hastie
7. Sandy Hinshelwood
8. Billy Hunter
9. Frank Laidlaw
10. Iain Laughland
11. John MacDonald
12. Ian McCrae
13. David Rollo
14. Brian Simmers
15. Peter Stagg
16. Jim Telfer
17. Jock Turner
18. Rob Welsh
19. David Whyte
20. Stewart Wilson

== Wales ==
1. Dewi Bebb
2. Ken Braddock
3. Gerald Davies
4. Gareth Edwards
5. Norman Gale
6. Grahame Hodgson
7. Billy Hullin
8. Keith Jarrett
9. Barry John
10. Ron Jones
11. Allan Lewis
12. John Lloyd
13. Billy Mainwaring
14. Dai Morris
15. John O'Shea
16. Alun Pask (c.)
17. Brian Price
18. Terry Price
19. Billy Raybould
20. Brian Rees
21. John Taylor
22. David Watkins (c.)
23. Stuart Watkins
24. Denzil Williams
