= 1970 Five Nations Championship =

Rugby union competition

- Date: 10 January - 18 April 1970
- Countries: England; Ireland; France; Scotland; Wales

Tournament statistics
- Champions: France and Wales
- Matches played: 10
- Tries scored: 38 (3.8 per match)
- Top point scorer: (England) Bob Hiller (15)
- Top try scorers: (France) Jean-Marie Bonal (2) (France) Benoît Dauga (2) (France) Jean-Pierre Lux (2) (Wales) Dai Morris (2)

The 1970 Five Nations Championship was the forty-first series of the rugby union Five Nations Championship. Including the previous incarnations as the Home Nations and Five Nations, this was the seventy-sixth series of the northern hemisphere rugby union championship. Ten matches were played between 10 January and 18 April. It was contested by England, France, Ireland, Scotland and Wales.

The England v Wales game at Twickenham was notable for two injuries. Robert Calmet, the French referee, had to leave the field at half time and was replaced by Johnny Johnson of England. Then, with 15 minutes to go, Gareth Edwards of Wales left the field injured. In doing so, it was the only time in his Welsh international career that Edwards failed to finish a game. Chico Hopkins of Maesteg took over, and not only set up a try for J. P. R. Williams, but then helped create history when he scored himself in injury time. It was the first try scored by a replacement player, to be awarded by a replacement referee at international level.

== Participants ==
Nation	Venue	City	Head coach	Captain
England	Twickenham Stadium	London	Don White	Bob Hiller
France	Stade Olympique Yves-du-Manoir	Colombes	Fernand Cazenave	Christian Carrère
Ireland	Lansdowne Road	Dublin	Ronnie Dawson	Tom Kiernan
Scotland	Murrayfield Stadium	Edinburgh	none	Jim Telfer
Wales	National Stadium	Cardiff	Clive Rowlands	Gareth Edwards

== Table ==
Pos	Team	Pld	W	D	L	PF	PA	PD	Pts
1	France	4	3	0	1	60	33	+27	6
1	Wales	4	3	0	1	46	42	+4	6
3	Ireland	4	2	0	2	33	28	+5	4
4	Scotland	4	1	0	3	43	50	−7	2
4	England	4	1	0	3	40	69	−29	2

== Results ==
1970-01-10

Scotland	9–11	France
Tries: Smith; Pen.: Lauder (2)	Report (Page 5)	Tries: Dauga; Lux; Con.: Pariès; Drops: Pariès

Murrayfield Stadium, Edinburgh
Attendance: 40,000
Referee: G. C. Lamb (England)

1970-01-24

France	8–0	Ireland
Tries: Sillières; Con.: Pariès; Drops: Pariès	Report (Page 5)

Stade Olympique Yves-du-Manoir, Colombes
Attendance: 35,915
Referee: R. F. Johnson (England)

1970-02-07

Wales	18–9	Scotland
Tries: Daniel; Dawes; Llewelyn; Morris; Con.: Daniel; Edwards (2)		Tries: Robertson; Pen.: Lauder; Drops: Robertson

National Stadium, Cardiff
Referee: D. P. d'Arcy (Ireland)

1970-02-14

England	9–3	Ireland
Tries: Shackleton; Drops: Hiller (2)		Pen.: Kiernan

Twickenham Stadium, London
Referee: A. R. Lewis (Wales)

1970-02-28

England	13–17	Wales
Tries: Duckham; Novak; Con.: Hiller (2); Pen.: Hiller		Tries: Davies; Hopkins; John; J. P. R. Williams; Con.: J. P. R. Williams; Drops: John

Twickenham Stadium, London
Attendance: 70,000
Referee: Robert Calmet (France), after halftime, Johnny Johnson (England)

1970-02-28

Ireland	16–11	Scotland
Tries: Brown; Gibson; Goodall; Molloy; Con.: Kiernan (2)		Tries: Lauder; M. Smith; Con.: I. Smith; Drops: Robertson

Lansdowne Road, Dublin
Attendance: C. Durand (France)

1970-03-14

Ireland	14–0	Wales
Tries: Duggan; Goodall; Con.: Kiernan; Pen.: Kiernan; Drops: McGann

Lansdowne Road, Dublin
Referee: G. C. Lamb (England)

1970-03-21

Scotland	14–5	England
Tries: Biggar; Turner; Con.: P. Brown; Pen.: P. Brown (2)		Tries: Spencer; Con.: Hiller

Murrayfield Stadium, Edinburgh
Referee: M. Joseph (Wales)

1970-04-04

Wales	11–6	France
Tries: Morris; Con.: J. P. R. Williams; Pen.: J. P. R. Williams (2)		Tries: Bonal; Cantoni

National Stadium, Cardiff
Attendance: 52,000
Referee: K. D. Kelleher (Ireland)

1970-04-18

France	35–13	England
Tries: Bérot; Bonal; Bourgarel; Dauga; Lux; Trillo; Con.: Villepreux (4); Pen.: Villepreux; Drops: Bérot; Villepreux		Tries: Spencer; Taylor; Con.: Jorden (2); Pen.: Jorden

Stade Olympique Yves-du-Manoir, Colombes
Attendance: 34,079
Referee: W. K. M. Jones (Wales)
