= List of Munster Rugby players =

Munster Rugby players include players who have earned significant accolades in club play with Munster Rugby or in international play.

== British & Irish Lions ==
The following Munster players have also represented the British & Irish Lions:

- W.J. Ashby: 1910
- Oliver Piper: 1910
- Michael Bradley: 1924
- William Roche: 1924
- Mick Lane: 1950
- Tom Clifford: 1950
- Jim McCarthy: 1950
- Tom Reid: 1955
- Michael English: 1959
- Gordon Wood: 1959
- Noel Murphy: 1959, 1966
- Tom Kiernan: 1962, 1968
- Jerry Walsh: 1966
- Barry Bresnihan: 1966, 1968
- Mick Doyle: 1968
- Moss Keane: 1974, 1977
- Colm Tucker: 1980
- Tony Ward: 1980
- Mike Kiernan: 1983
- Gerry McLoughlin: 1983
- Donal Lenihan: 1983, 1989
- Mick Galwey: 1993
- Richard Wallace: 1993
- Keith Wood: 1997, 2001
- Rob Henderson: 2001
- Ronan O'Gara: 2001, 2005, 2009
- David Wallace: 2001, 2009
- John Hayes: 2005, 2009
- Donncha O'Callaghan: 2005, 2009
- Paul O'Connell: 2005, 2009, 2013
- Keith Earls: 2009
- Conor Murray: 2013, 2017, 2021
- Simon Zebo: 2013
- Peter O'Mahony: 2017
- CJ Stander: 2017
- Tadhg Beirne: 2021

== The '200' Club ==
Players who have reached the 200 caps mark for Munster.

- Anthony Foley (1994–2008): 201
- Alan Quinlan (1996–2011): 212
- Peter Stringer (1998–2013): 232
- Ronan O'Gara (1997–2013): 240
- John Hayes (1998–2011): 217
- David Wallace (1997–2012): 203
- Marcus Horan (1999–2013): 225
- Mick O'Driscoll (1998–2003, 2005–12) 207
- Donncha O'Callaghan (1998–2015): 268
- Billy Holland (2007–2021): 247
- Stephen Archer (2009–Present): 293
- Dave Kilcoyne (2011–Present): 220
- John Ryan (2011–Present): 234
- Jack O’Donoghue (2014–Present): 213

== Overseas players ==
Note: Flags indicate national union as has been defined under WR eligibility rules. Players may hold more than one non-WR nationality.

- (New Zealand) Rhys Ellison: 1997–99
- (Australia) John Langford: 1999–2001
- (Australia) Jim Williams: 2001–05
- (England) Dominic Malone: 2002
- (Australia) Simon Kerr: 2004–05
- (England) Andy Long: 2003
- (Wales) Jason Jones-Hughes: 2003–04
- (Australia) David Pusey: 2003–05
- (Scotland) Gordon McIlwham: 2003–05
- (New Zealand) Christian Cullen: 2003–07
- (New Zealand) Tom Bowman: 2004–05
- (England) Gary Connolly: 2005–06
- (South Africa) Anton Pitout: 2005–06
- (South Africa) Trevor Halstead: 2005–07
- (Italy) Federico Pucciariello: 2005–09
- (Portugal) Diogo Mateus: 2006
- (Wales) Chris Wyatt: 2006–07
- (New Zealand) Lifeimi Mafi: 2006–12
- (New Zealand) Rua Tipoki: 2007–09
- (Australia) Paul Warwick: 2007–11
- (New Zealand) Doug Howlett: 2008–13
- (New Zealand) Nick Williams: 2008–10
- (South Africa) Jean de Villiers: 2009–10
- (France) Julien Brugnaut: 2009–10
- (New Zealand) Toby Morland: 2009–10
- (South Africa) Wian du Preez: 2009–13
- (New Zealand) Sam Tuitupou: 2010–11
- (New Zealand) Peter Borlase: 2010-12
- (South Africa) BJ Botha: 2011–16
- (Australia) Will Chambers 2011–12
- (New Zealand) Savenaca Tokula: 2012
- (New Zealand) Casey Laulala: 2012–14
- (South Africa) CJ Stander: 2012–21
- (South Africa) Gerhard van den Heever: 2013–16
- (New Zealand) Quentin MacDonald: 2014 (loan)
- (Australia) Andrew Smith: 2014–15
- (New Zealand) Tyler Bleyendaal: 2014–20
- (Argentina) Eusebio Guiñazú: 2014–15
- (South Africa) Pat Howard: 2014–15
- (New Zealand) Francis Saili: 2015–17
- (Australia) Mark Chisholm: 2015–17
- (Argentina) Lucas González Amorosino: 2015–16
- (Uruguay) Mario Sagario: 2015–16
- (New Zealand) Rhys Marshall: 2016–21
- (South Africa) Jean Kleyn: 2016–Present
- (South Africa) Jaco Taute: 2016–19
- (South Africa) Thomas du Toit: 2016–17
- (New Zealand) Te Aihe Toma: 2016–17
- (South Africa) Gerbrandt Grobler: 2017–18
- (South Africa) Chris Cloete: 2017–2022
- (South Africa) Arno Botha: 2018–20
- (New Zealand) Alby Mathewson: 2018–19
- (Australia) Jed Holloway: 2019
- (South Africa) Keynan Knox: 2019–2024
- (South Africa) RG Snyman: 2020–2024
- (South Africa) Damian de Allende: 2020–2022
- (United States) Roman Salanoa: 2020–Present
- (South Africa) Jason Jenkins: 2021–2022
- (Australia) Declan Moore: 2021–22
- (New Zealand) Malakai Fekitoa: 2022-2023
- (New Zealand) Alex Nankivell: 2023–Present
- (South Africa) Thaakir Abrahams: 2024–Present

== Individual records ==
(correct as of December 2024)

=== All-time ===
- **Most appearances: (295)** (Ireland) Stephen Archer
- **Most points: (2,571)** (Ireland) Ronan O'Gara
- **Most tries: (73)** (Ireland) Simon Zebo
- **Most cons & pens: (924)** (Ireland) Ronan O'Gara

=== Heineken Cup ===
- **Most appearances: (110)** (Ireland) Ronan O'Gara
- **Most points: (1,365)** (Ireland) **Ronan O'Gara**
- **Most tries: (26)** (Ireland) Simon Zebo
- **Most cons & pens: (488)** (Ireland) **Ronan O'Gara**

=== URC ===
- **Most appearances: (229)** (Ireland) Stephen Archer
- **Most points: (940)** (Ireland) Ronan O'Gara
- **Most tries: (45)** (Ireland) Simon Zebo
- **Most cons & pens: (349)** (Ireland) Ronan O'Gara

Bold indicates highest overall record.

== ERC Elite Awards ==
- Team Award (50 Heineken Cup matches): (Ireland) **Munster Rugby** (187)

== ERC Player Awards ==
- 100 caps: (Ireland) Ronan O'Gara (110), (Ireland) John Hayes (101)
- 50 caps: (Ireland) Ronan O'Gara (110), (Ireland) John Hayes (101), (Ireland) Donncha O'Callaghan (97), (Ireland) Peter Stringer (90), (Ireland) David Wallace (86), (Ireland) Anthony Foley (85), (Ireland) Marcus Horan (84), Paul O'Connell (82), (Ireland) Keith Earls (79), (Ireland) Alan Quinlan (78), (Ireland) Conor Murray (76), (Ireland) Peter O'Mahony (71), (Ireland) John Kelly (67), (Ireland) Dave Kilcoyne (58), (Ireland) Stephen Archer (57), (Ireland) John Ryan (57), (Ireland) Anthony Horgan (56), (Ireland) Frankie Sheahan (55), (Ireland) Mick O'Driscoll (55), (Ireland) Simon Zebo (52), (Ireland) CJ Stander (50)
- 500 Heineken Cup points: (Ireland) Ronan O'Gara (1,365)

== World Rugby Hall of Fame ==
The World Rugby Hall of Fame (formerly the IRB Hall of Fame) recognises special achievement and contribution to the sport of rugby union

- (Ireland) Ronan O'Gara (2018)

== ERC15 European Player Award ==
An award to recognise the best European player in the Heineken Cup from 1995–2010.

- (Ireland) Ronan O'Gara

== ERC European Dream Team ==
The following Munster players were selected in the ERC European Dream Team, an all–time dream team of Heineken Cup players.

- (Ireland) Ronan O'Gara (Fly-half), 1997–2013
- (Ireland) David Wallace (Flanker), 1997–2012
- (Ireland) Anthony Foley (Number 8), 1995–2008

== Pro14 Team of the Year ==
- 2007–08: (Tonga) Lifeimi Mafi
- 2008–09: (Tonga) Lifeimi Mafi, (Ireland) Ronan O'Gara, (Ireland) Jerry Flannery, (Ireland) Paul O'Connell
- 2009–10: (Ireland) Tomás O'Leary
- 2010–11: (Ireland) Ronan O'Gara
- 2011–12: (South Africa) BJ Botha
- 2013–14: (Ireland) Dave Kilcoyne, (New Zealand) Casey Laulala
- 2014–15: (South Africa) CJ Stander, (Ireland) Tommy O'Donnell
- 2015–16: (South Africa) CJ Stander
- 2016–17: (South Africa) CJ Stander, (South Africa) Jaco Taute, (Ireland) Rory Scannell, (Ireland) Billy Holland, (Ireland) John Ryan, (Ireland) Dave Kilcoyne, (New Zealand) Tyler Bleyendaal
- 2017–18: (Ireland) Rory Scannell
- 2018–19: (Ireland) Peter O'Mahony, (Ireland) Tadhg Beirne
- 2020-21: (Ireland) Kevin O'Byrne, (Ireland) Billy Holland, (South Africa) Damian de Allende

== Pro14 Golden Boot ==
The Golden Boot is awarded to the kicker who has successfully converted the highest percentage of place kicks during the 22-week regular Pro14 season. The prize has been awarded annually since 2012. (Percentage success rate in brackets)

- 2013–14 (Ireland) JJ Hanrahan (88.71%)
- 2019–20 (Ireland) JJ Hanrahan (87.30%)
