= 1969 Five Nations Championship =

Rugby union competition

- Date: 11 January - 12 April 1969
- Countries: England; Ireland; France; Scotland; Wales

Tournament statistics
- Champions: Wales (16th title)
- Triple Crown: Wales (11th title)
- Matches played: 10
- Tries scored: 31 (3.1 per match)
- Top point scorer: (England) Bob Hiller (36)
- Top try scorer: (Wales) Maurice Richards (6)

The 1969 Five Nations Championship was the fortieth series of the rugby union Five Nations Championship. Including the previous incarnations as the Home Nations and Five Nations, this was the seventy-fifth series of the northern hemisphere rugby union championship. Ten matches were played between 11 January and 12 April. It was contested by England, France, Ireland, Scotland and Wales.

Ireland missed out on a second Grand Slam after losing to Wales at Cardiff Arms Park.

== Participants ==
The teams involved were:

Nation	Venue	City	Head coach	Captain
England	Twickenham	London	none	Dick Greenwood
France	Stade Olympique Yves-du-Manoir	Colombes	Fernand Cazenave	Christian Carrère/Marcel Puget/Walter Spanghero
Ireland	Lansdowne Road	Dublin	Ronnie Dawson	Tom Kiernan
Scotland	Murrayfield	Edinburgh	none	Jim Telfer
Wales	National Stadium	Cardiff	Clive Rowlands	Brian Price/Gareth Edwards

== Table ==
Pos	Team	Pld	W	D	L	PF	PA	PD	Pts
1	Wales	4	3	1	0	79	31	+48	7
2	Ireland	4	3	0	1	61	48	+13	6
3	England	4	2	0	2	54	58	−4	4
4	Scotland	4	1	0	3	12	44	−32	2
5	France	4	0	1	3	28	53	−25	1

== Results ==
1969-01-11

France	3–6	Scotland
Pen.: Villepreux		Tries: J. Telfer; Pen.: Blaikie

Stade Olympique Yves-du-Manoir, Colombes
Attendance: 28,576
Referee: G. C. Lamb (England)

1969-01-25

Ireland	17–9	France
Tries: Moroney; Con.: Moroney; Pen.: Moroney (3); Drops: McGann		Tries: Trillo; Pen.: Villepreux (2)

Lansdowne Road, Dublin
Attendance: 50,000
Referee: G. C. Lamb (England)

1969-02-01

Scotland	3–17	Wales
Pen. Blaikie		Tries: Edwards; John; Richards; Con.: Jarrett; Pen.: Jarrett (2)

Murrayfield, Edinburgh
Referee: K. D. Kelleher (Ireland)

1969-02-08

Ireland	17–15	England
Tries: Bresnihan; Murphy; Con.: Kiernan; Pen.: Kiernan (2); Drops: McGann		Tries: Duckham; Pen.: Hiller (4)

Lansdowne Road, Dublin
Referee: R. P. Burrell (Scotland)

1969-02-22

England	22–8	France
Tries: Fielding; Rollitt; Webb; Con.: Hiller (2); Pen.: Hiller (3)		Tries: Bonal; Con.: Lacaze; Drops: Lacaze

Twickenham, London
Attendance: 65,000
Referee: D. P. d'Arcy (Ireland)

1969-02-22

Scotland	0–16	Ireland
		Tries: Bresnihan; Duggan; Gibson; McGann; Con.: Moroney (2)

Murrayfield, Edinburgh
Referee: M. Joseph (Wales)

1969-03-08

Wales	24–11	Ireland
Tries: Morris; Taylor; Watkins; D. Williams; Con.: Jarrett (3); Pen.: Jarrett; Drops: John		Tries: Gibson; Con.: Kiernan; Pen.: Kiernan (2)

National Stadium, Cardiff
Attendance: 29,000
Referee: D. C. J. McMahon (Scotland)

1969-03-15

England	8–3	Scotland
Tries: Duckham (2); Con.: Hiller		Pen.: P. Brown

Twickenham, London
Referee: C. Durand (France)

1969-03-22

France	8–8	Wales
Tries: Campaes; Con.: Villepreux; Pen.: Villepreux		Tries: Edwards; Richards; Con.: Jarrett

Stade Olympique Yves-du-Manoir, Colombes
Attendance: 34,657
Referee: R. P. Burrell (Scotland)

1969-04-12

Wales	30–9	England
Tries: John; Richards (4); Con.: Jarrett (3); Pen.: Jarrett (2); Drops: John		Pen.: Hiller (3)

National Stadium, Cardiff
Attendance: 29,000
Referee: D. P. d'Arcy (Ireland)
