= Ken Plummer =

Ken Plummer may refer to:

- Ken Plummer (sociologist) (1946–2022), professor of sociology at the University of Essex
- Ken Plummer (rugby union) (born 1947), English rugby union player
