= 1968 British Lions tour to South Africa =

Rugby union matches played by British and Irish Lions team in South Africa in 1968

- Date: 26 May – 28 August
- Coach: Ronnie Dawson
- Tour captain: (Ireland) Tom Kiernan
- Test series winners: South Africa (3–0)
- Top test point scorer: (Ireland) Tom Kiernan (35)
Summary
P	W	D	L
Total
20	15	1	4
Test match
4	0	1	3
Opponent
P	W	D	L
South Africa
4	0	1	3

Tour chronology
- ← Australia and New Zealand 1966 New Zealand 1971 →

In 1968 the British Lions toured South Africa. The tour was not successful in terms of international results, the Lions losing the Test series against South Africa by three matches to nil, with the other match drawn. The Lions won 15 of their 16 non-international matches, losing only to Transvaal. The touring party was captained by Tom Kiernan, coached by Ronnie Dawson and managed by David Brooks. Star back Barry John broke his collar bone in a dangerous tackle in the first Test.

As well as South Africa, games were played against South West Africa (the future Namibia, then part of South Africa) and Rhodesia (the future Zimbabwe).

Unlike the previous two tours to South Africa (1955 and 1962), this British Lions team did not stop off in Nairobi, Kenya, to play East Africa on the way home. However, one member of this tour party was later to play against that team; in 1975 Peter Stagg was living in Zambia and playing rugby for the Ndola Wanderers RFC when the Tuskers visited and he played for Zambia in their first international on 31 August 1975 at Kitwe. Six of the squad would ultimately change codes and play professional rugby league, they are; Mike Coulman, Ken Goodall, Keith Jarrett, Keri Jones, Maurice Richards, and Bryan West.

== Squad ==
Backs:

- Barry Bresnihan (University College Dublin and Ireland)
- Gordon Connell (Trinity Academicals and Scotland)
- Gerald Davies (Cardiff and Wales)
- Gareth Edwards (Cardiff and Wales)
- Mike Gibson (North of Ireland FC and Ireland)
- Bob Hiller (Harlequins and England)
- Sandy Hinshelwood (London Scottish and Scotland)
- Keith Jarrett (Newport and Wales)
- Barry John (Cardiff and Wales)
- Keri Jones (Cardiff and Wales)
- Tom Kiernan (capt) (Cork Constitution and Ireland)
- Billy Raybould (London Welsh and Wales)
- Maurice Richards (Cardiff and Wales)
- Keith Savage (Northampton and England)
- Jock Turner (Gala and Scotland)
- Roger Young (Queen's University RFC and Ireland)

Forwards:

- Rodger Arneil (Edinburgh Academicals and Scotland)
- Mike Coulman (Moseley and England)
- Mick Doyle (Blackrock College and Ireland)
- Ken Goodall (City of Derry and Ireland)
- Tony Horton (Blackheath and England)
- Peter Larter (Northampton and England)
- Willie John McBride (Ballymena and Ireland)
- Syd Millar (Ballymena and Ireland)
- John O'Shea (Cardiff and Wales)
- John Pullin (Bristol and England)
- Peter Stagg (Sale and Scotland)
- John Taylor (London Welsh and Wales)
- Bob Taylor (Northampton and England)
- Jim Telfer (Melrose and Scotland)
- Delme Thomas (Llanelli and Wales)
- Bryan West (Northampton and England)
- Jeff Young (Harrogate and Wales)

Bob Lloyd (Harlequins and England) was selected in the original touring team but had to withdraw because of exam commitments and was replaced by Jarrett.

== Results ==
Date	Venue		Score	Opposition	Result
18 May 1968	Potchefstroom	Lions	20–12	Western Transvaal	Won
22 May 1968	Newlands, Cape Town	Lions	10–6	Western Province	Won
25 May 1968	Mossel Bay	Lions	24–6	South West Districts	Won
29 May 1968	Port Elizabeth	Lions	23–14	Eastern Province	Won
1 June 1968	Durban	Lions	17–5	Natal	Won
3 June 1968	Salisbury	Lions	32–6	Rhodesia	Won
8 June 1968	Loftus Versfeld, Pretoria	Lions	20–25	South Africa	Lost
12 June 1968	Upington	Lions	25–5	North West Cape	Won
15 June 1968	Windhoek	Lions	23–0	South West Africa	Won
18 June 1968	Ellis Park, Johannesburg	Lions	6–14	Transvaal	Lost
22 June 1968	Port Elizabeth	Lions	6–6	South Africa	Draw
29 June 1968	Springs	Lions	37–9	Eastern Transvaal	Won
3 July 1968	Pretoria	Lions	22–19	Northern Transvaal	Won
6 July 1968	Kimberley	Lions	11–3	Griqualand West	Won
8 July 1968	Wellington	Lions	14–0	Boland	Won
13 July 1968	Newlands, Cape Town	Lions	6–11	South Africa	Lost
17 July 1968	East London	Lions	26–6	Border	Won
20 July 1968	Bloemfontein	Lions	9–3	Orange Free State	Won
22 July 1968	Cradock	Lions	40–12	North East Cape	Won
27 July 1968	Ellis Park, Johannesburg	Lions	6–19	South Africa	Lost

== Matches ==
18 May 1968

Western Transvaal	12–20	Lions
Pen: Durandt (3), Blignaut		Try: Telfer (2), Turner, Davies; Con: Kiernan; Pen: Kiernan (2)

Potchefstroom
Referee: A. Bird

22 May 1968

Western Province	6–10	Lions
Pen: van der Merwe, Naude		Try: Savage, Richards; Con: Kiernan (2)

Newlands, Cape Town
Referee: Max Baise

25 May 1968

South Western Districts	6–24	Lions
Pen: Kromhout (2)		Try: Hinshelwood (2), Taylor, Jones; Con: Hiller (3); Pen: Hiller (2)

Mossel Bay
Referee: W. C. Malan

29 May 1968

Eastern Province	14–23	Lions
Try: Nortje; Con: Carelse; Pen: Carelse (2), Adlam		Try: Hinshelwood, Hiller; Con: Hiller; Pen: Hiller (3); Drop: Turner (2)

Port Elizabeth
Referee: C. de Bruyn

1 June 1968

Natal	5–17	Lions
Try: McIntosh; Con: Swanby		Try: Edwards, Bresnihan, Turner, Richards; Con: Kiernan; Pen: Kiernan

Kings Park, Durban
Referee: W. T. F. Lane

3 June 1968

Rhodesia	6–32	Lions
Try: Smith; Pen: Martin		Try: O'Shea (2), Hinshelwood, Jarrett, Thomas; Con: Kiernan (2), Jarrett (2); Pen: Kiernan, Jarrett; Drop: Gibson

Salisbury
Referee: P. Robertse

8 June 1968

South Africa	25–20	Lions
Try: Naude, de Villiers, du Preez; Con: Visagie (2); Pen: Visagie (2), Naude (2)		Try: McBride; Con: Kiernan; Pen: Kiernan (5)

Loftus Versfeld, Pretoria
Referee: Max Baise

12 June 1968

North West Cape	5–25	Lions
Try: Bruwer; Con: Basson		Try: Hinshelwood, Turner, Young, Telfer, Gibson; Con: Hiller (2); Pen: Hiller (2)

Upington
Referee: J. P. J. Schoeman

15 June 1968

South West Africa	0–23	Lions
		Try: Edwards (2), Hiller, Raybould, Savage; Con: Hiller; Pen: Hiller (2)

Windhoek
Referee: H. Kruger

18 June 1968

Transvaal	14–6	Lions
Try: Barnard; Con: du Toit; Pen: Steyn, Dannhauser, du Toit		Try: Gibson; Pen: Kiernan

Ellis Park, Johannesburg
Referee: J. Stander

22 June 1968

South Africa	6–6	Lions
Pen: Naude, Visagie		Pen: Kiernan (2)

Boet Erasmus Stadium, Port Elizabeth
Referee: J. P. J. Schoeman

29 June 1968

Eastern Transvaal	9–37	Lions
Try: Cronje, Hector; Pen: Nel		Try: Gibson, Young, Davies, Taylor, Doyle, Richards; Con: Hiller (5); Pen: Hiller; Drop: Gibson (2)

PAM Brink Stadium, Springs
Referee: H. Woolley

3 July 1968

Northern Transvaal	19–22	Lions
Try: Fourie du Preez (2), Pitzer; Con: Pretorius (2); Pen: Pretorius; Drop: Steyn		Try: Richards, Coulman; Con: Kiernan (2); Pen: Kiernan (4)

Loftus Versfeld Stadium, Pretoria
Referee: M. W. Odendaal

6 July 1968

Griqualand West	3–11	Lions
Pen: Visagie		Try: Edwards (2); Con: Jarrett; Pen: Kiernan

Kimberley
Referee: K. Weyer

8 July 1968

Boland	0–14	Lions
		Try: Davies, Edwards, Savage; Con: Hiller; Pen: Hiller

Wellington
Referee: J. Hamilton

13 July 1968

South Africa	11–6	Lions
Try: Lourens; Con: Visagie; Pen: Visagie, Naude		Pen: Kiernan (2)

Newlands, Cape Town
Referee: Max Baise

17 July 1968

Border	6–26	Lions
Try: Harper; Pen: Carstens		Try: Gibson; Con: Hiller; Pen: Hiller (5); Drop: Hiller (2)

East London
Referee: K. Carlson

20 July 1968

Orange Free State	3–9	Lions
Pen: du Toit		Try: Richards; Pen: Kiernan; Drop: Gibson

Bloemfontein
Referee: H. J. du Plooy

22 July 1968

North East Cape	12–40	Lions
Try: de la Rosa; Pen: van Vuuren, Weideman; Drop: Botha		Try: Raybould, Jarrett, J. Taylor, Hinshelwood, Doyle, Thomas, Bresnihan; Con: Hiller (5); Pen: Hiller (2), Jarrett

Cradock
Referee: H. J. du Plooy

27 July 1968

South Africa	19–6	Lions
Try: Roux, Ellis, Olivier, Nomis; Con: Visagie (2); Drop: Gould		Pen: Kiernan (2)

Ellis Park, Johannesburg
Referee: Bertie Strasheim

== Bibliography ==
- Reason, John (1968). The 1968 Lions : the British Isles tour of South Africa. London: Eyre & Spottiswoode. ISBN 0413272400.
