= Colin Grimshaw =

Colin Grimshaw may refer to:

- Colin Grimshaw (rugby union) (born 1947), Irish rugby union player
- Colin Grimshaw, character on Coronation Street
