= 1966 British Lions tour to Australia and New Zealand =

- Date: May–Sep 1966
- Coach: (Wales) John Robins
- Tour captains: (Wales) David Watkins; (Scotland) Mike Campbell-Lamerton
- Test series winners: (v Australia) British Lions (2–0); (v New Zealand) New Zealand (4–0)
- Top test point scorer: (Scotland) Stewart Wilson (30)
Summary
P	W	D	L
Total
35	23	3	9
Test match
7	3	0	4
Opponent
P	W	D	L
Australia
2	2	0	0
New Zealand
4	0	0	4
Canada
1	1	0	0

Tour chronology
- ← South Africa 1962 South Africa 1968 →

In 1966 the British Lions toured Australia and New Zealand. The Lions won the two test matches against Australia but lost all four internationals against the All Blacks.

Overall the tourists played thirty-five matches, winning twenty-three, losing nine and drawing three. In Australia the Lions played eight matches, winning seven and drawing the other. In New Zealand they played twenty-five matches, winning fifteen, drawing two and losing eight – in addition to their four test defeats they also lost to Southland, Otago, Wellington and Wanganui-King Country. They also played two matches in Canada, winning one and losing one.

The touring party was captained by Mike Campbell-Lamerton. The manager was Des O'Brien and for the first time a Lions touring team had a coach, John Robins, rather than an assistant manager.

== Squad ==
=== Management ===
- Manager Des O'Brien (Ireland)
- Coach John Robins (Wales)

=== Backs ===
- Terry Price (Llanelli and Wales)
- Don Rutherford (Gloucester and England)
- Stewart Wilson (London Scottish and Scotland)
- Dewi Bebb (Swansea and Wales)
- Barry Bresnihan (University College Dublin and Ireland)
- Sandy Hinshelwood (London Scottish and Scotland)
- Ken Jones (Cardiff and Wales)
- Colin McFadyean (Moseley and England)
- Keith Savage (Northampton and England)
- Jerry Walsh (Sunday's Well and Ireland)
- Stuart Watkins (Newport and Wales)
- Mike Weston (Durham City and England)
- Mike Gibson (Cambridge University and Ireland)
- Allan Lewis (Abertillery and Wales)
- David Watkins (Newport and Wales)
- Roger Young (Queen's University R.F.C. and Ireland)

=== Forwards ===
- Mike Campbell-Lamerton (capt) (London Scottish and Scotland)
- Derrick Grant (Hawick and Scotland)
- Ken Kennedy (CIYMS and Ireland)
- Frank Laidlaw (Melrose and Scotland)
- Ronnie Lamont (Instonians and Ireland)
- Willie John McBride (Ballymena and Ireland)
- Ray McLoughlin (Gosforth and Ireland)
- Noel Murphy (Cork Constitution and Ireland)
- Howard Norris (Cardiff and Wales)
- Alun Pask (Abertillery and Wales)
- David Powell (Northampton and England)
- Brian Price (Newport and Wales)
- Gareth Prothero (Bridgend and Wales)
- Jim Telfer (Melrose and Scotland)
- Delme Thomas (Llanelli and Wales)
- Denzil Williams (Ebbw Vale and Wales)

== Results ==
Complete list of matches played by the British Isles in Australia and New Zealand:

Test matches

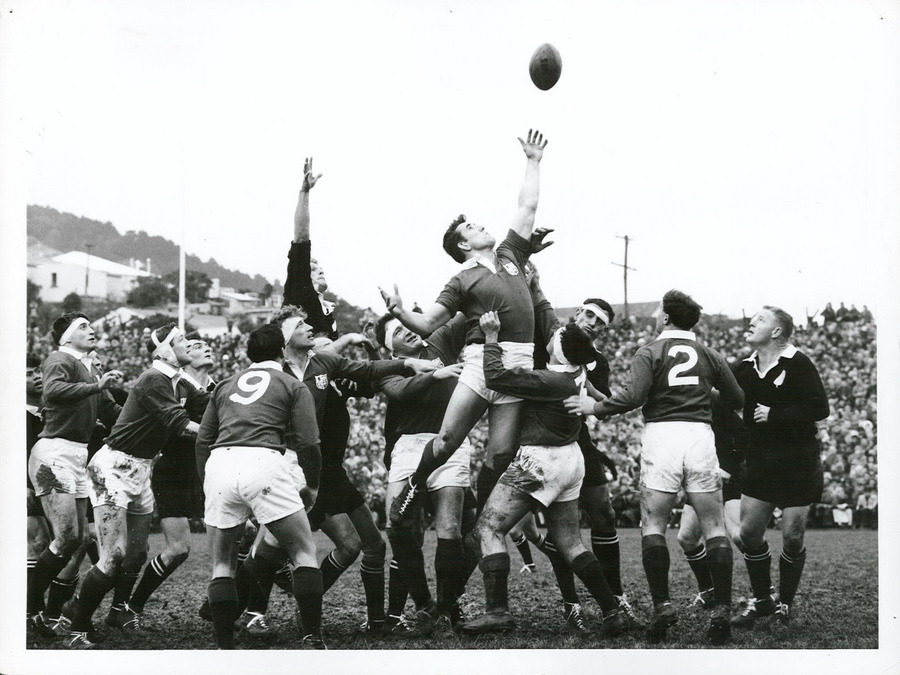
The Lions in their second test vs New Zealand

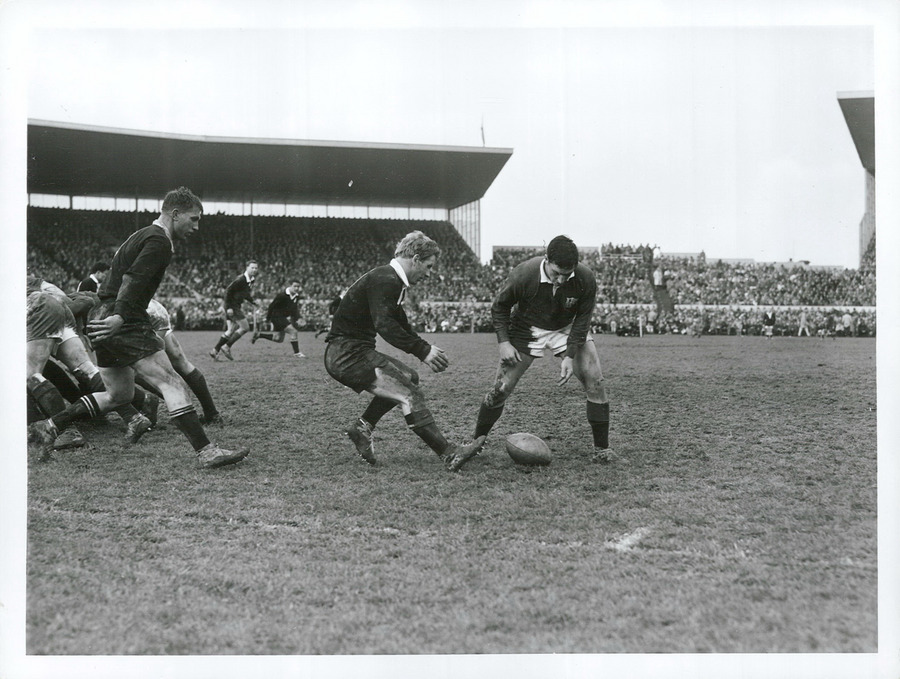
The British Isles vs Wellington at Athletic Park

#	Date	Rival	Score	Ground/City	Country
1	7 May	Western Australia	60–3	Perry Lakes Stadium, Perth	Australia
2	11 May	South Australia	38–11	Norwood Oval, Adelaide	Australia
3	14 May	(Victoria (state)) Victoria	24–14	Olympic Park, Melbourne	Australia
4	18 May	(New South Wales) Country	6–3	Manuka Oval, Canberra	Australia
5	21 May	New South Wales	6–6	Sydney	Australia
6	28 May	Australia	11–8	Cricket Ground, Sydney	Australia
7	31 May	Queensland	26–3	Lang Park, Brisbane	Australia
8	4 Jun	Australia	31–0	Lang Park, Brisbane	Australia
9	11 Jun	Southland	8–14	Rugby Park, Invercargill	New Zealand
10	15 Jun	South Canterbury / Mid Canterbury / North Otago	20–12	Fraser Park, Timaru	New Zealand
11	18 Jun	Otago	9–17	Carisbrook, Otago	New Zealand
12	22 Jun	New Zealand Universities	24–11	Lancaster Park, Christchurch	New Zealand
13	25 Jun	Wellington	6–20	Athletic Park, Wellington	New Zealand
14	29 Jun	Nelson / Marlborough / Golden Bay-Motueka	22–14	Trafalgar Park, Nelson	New Zealand
15	2 Jul	Taranaki	12–9	Rugby Park, New Plymouth	New Zealand
16	6 Jul	Bay of Plenty	6–6	Rugby Park, Rotorua	New Zealand
17	9 Jul	North Auckland	6–3	Okara Park, Whangārei	New Zealand
18	16 Jul	New Zealand	3–20	Carisbrook, Dunedin	New Zealand
19	20 Jul	West Coast-Buller	25–6	Victoria Square, Westport	New Zealand
20	23 Jul	Canterbury	8–6	Lancaster Park, Christchurch	New Zealand
21	27 Jul	Manawatu / Horowhenua	17–8	Showgrounds, Palmerston North	New Zealand
22	30 Jul	Auckland	12–6	Eden Park, Auckland	New Zealand
23	2 Aug	Wairarapa / Bush	9–6	Memorial Park, Masterton	New Zealand
24	6 Aug	New Zealand	12–16	Athletic Park, Wellington	New Zealand
25	10 Aug	Wanganui / King Country	6–12	Cooks Gardens, Wanganui	New Zealand
26	13 Aug	New Zealand Māori	16–14	Eden Park, Auckland	New Zealand
27	17 Aug	East Coast / Poverty Bay	9–6	Rugby Park, Gisborne	New Zealand
28	20 Aug	Hawke's Bay	11–11	McLean Park, Napier	New Zealand
29	27 Aug	New Zealand	6–19	Lancaster Park, Christchurch	New Zealand
30	31 Aug	New Zealand Juniors	9–3	Athletic Park, Wellington	New Zealand
31	3 Sep	Waikato	20–9	Rugby Park, Hamilton	New Zealand
32	6 Sep	Counties / Thames Valley	13–9	Massey Park, Papakura	New Zealand
33	10 Sep	New Zealand	11–24	Eden Park, Auckland	New Zealand
34	14 Sep	British Columbia	3–8	Vancouver	Canada
35	17 Sep	Canada	19–8	Toronto	Canada
