= Michel Pebeyre =

France international rugby union player

- Born: 21 June 1948 (age 78) Brive-la-Gaillarde, France
- Height: 5 ft 11 in (180 cm)
- Weight: 181 lb (82 kg)

Rugby union career
- Position: Scrum-half
International career
Years	Team	Apps	(Points)
1970–73	France	7	(3)

Michel Pebeyre (born 21 June 1948) is a French former international rugby union player.

Pebeyre is the son of 1940s France wing three–quarter Élie Pebeyre.

A scrum-half, Pebeyre was a junior product of CA Brive and played his early senior rugby with RC Vichy, having moved to the area for his studies. He debuted for France in their final 1970 Five Nations fixture, a win over England at Colombes which secured a share of the championship title. His remaining six caps came following a switch to AS Montferrand and included both Test matches on France's 1971 tour of South Africa.

Pebeyre became a rugby administrator and in 2024 contested the elections for the French Rugby Federation presidency.

== See also ==
- List of France national rugby union players
