= Martin Hale =

England international rugby union player

- Full name: Peter Martin Hale
- Born: 12 August 1943 Birmingham, England
- Died: 12 November 2022 (aged 79)

Rugby union career
- Position: Wing
International career
Years	Team	Apps	(Points)
1969–70	England	3	(0)

Peter Martin Hale (12 August 1943 - 2022) was an English rugby union international.

Hale was born in Birmingham and educated at Solihull School.

A winger, Hale scored 48 tries for Moseley in the 1967–68 season and gained his first England cap against the Springboks at Twickenham in 1969. He earned a further two caps in the 1970 Five Nations Championship. During this period, he rebuffed an approach to play rugby league for Swinton. He continued his rugby union career at Bath in 1972.

== See also ==
- List of England national rugby union players
