= Jean Le Droff =

France international rugby union player

- Born: 22 June 1939 Ordan-Larroque, France
- Died: 11 November 2021 (aged 82) Toulouse, France
- Height: 6 ft 3 in (191 cm)
- Weight: 224 lb (102 kg)

Rugby union career
- Position: Lock
International career
Years	Team	Apps	(Points)
1963–71	France	9	(0)

Jean Le Droff (22 June 1939 – 11 November 2021) was a French international rugby union player.

Le Droff hailed from Ordan-Larroque and was of Breton descent.

A lock forward, Le Droff played with FC Auch through the 1960s and was known as a skilled line–out jumper. He gained nine France caps between 1963 and 1971, participating in their successful 1970 Five Nations campaign.

Le Droff, a farmer, was a veteran of the Algerian War.

== See also ==
- List of France national rugby union players
