= Gérard Sutra =

French rugby union player (born 1946)

- Born: 21 March 1946 (age 80) Narbonne, France
- Height: 5 ft 6 in (168 cm)
- Weight: 153 lb (69 kg)

Rugby union career
- Position: Scrum-half
International career
Years	Team	Apps	(Points)
1967–70	France	4	(0)

Gérard Sutra (born 21 March 1946) is a French former international rugby union player.

Born and raised in Narbonne, Sutra grew up supporting RC Narbonne, where he began playing rugby union as a 10-year-old in one of their underage sides. He made his first XV debut for the club at the age of 16.

Sutra was capped four times as a scrum-half for France. He made his debut during France's 1967 tour of South Africa, playing the second Test match against the Springboks in Bloemfontein. His second cap came in the 1969 Five Nations as a member of the XV which drew 8–8 with Wales, to end a 10-game losing streak for the national team. He featured twice in France's championship–winning 1970 Five Nations campaign. After ending his playing career, spent entirely with RC Narbonne, Sutra served as the club's coach and led them to the 1978–79 French Championship title.

Outside of rugby, Sutra has operated several businesses, the first being a sports shop in Narbonne he opened when he was 21. He moved to Brazil in 1993 and for the next 20 years ran a bed and breakfast at a villa in Búzios.

== See also ==
- List of France national rugby union players
