= Trevor Wintle =

England international rugby union player

- Full name: Trevor Clifford Wintle
- Born: 10 January 1940 (age 86) Forest of Dean, England
- Died: September 2026 (aged 85–86)
- School: Lydney Grammar School
- University: University of Cambridge
- Occupation: Doctor

Rugby union career
- Position: Scrum-half
Amateur team(s)
Years	Team	Apps	(Points)
1957-1961	Lydney	7	(3)
- Rosslyn Park
- St Mary's Hospital
	Northampton	83	
	Barbarians	6	
International career
Years	Team	Apps	(Points)
1966–69	England	5	(0)

Trevor Clifford Wintle (10 January 1940 - September 2026 ) was an English former international rugby union player.

Born in the Forest of Dean, Gloucestershire, Wintle attended Lydney Grammar School, during which time he was a schoolboy international at Rugby Union and Cricket.

Wintle studied medicine at the University of Cambridge, winning rugby blues in 1960 and 1961. He then came down to London and played with Rosslyn Park and St. Mary's Hospital. After qualifying as a doctor, Wintle joined a hospital in Northampton and played for Northampton RFC.

Wintle was capped five times as a scrum-half for England. He made his debut against Scotland in the 1966 Five Nations and partnered John Finlan at half-back for all four of England's 1969 Five Nations matches.

== See also ==
- List of England national rugby union players
