= Ordan-Larroque =

- Commune
- Coat of arms
- Location of Ordan-Larroque
- Location within France Location within Occitanie
- Coordinates: 43°41′18″N 0°27′42″E
- Country: France
- Region: Occitania
- Department: Gers
- Arrondissement: Auch
- Canton: Gascogne-Auscitaine
- Intercommunality: CA Grand Auch Cœur Gascogne

Government
  - Mayor (2020–2026): Marie-Line Everlet
- Area^{1}: 42.64 km^{2} (16.46 sq mi)
- Elevation: 420 m (1,380 ft)
- Highest elevation: 273 m (896 ft)
- Lowest elevation: 135 m (443 ft)
- Population (2023): 858
  - Density: 20.1/km^{2} (52.1/sq mi)
- Time zone: UTC+01:00 (CET)
  - Summer (DST): UTC+02:00 (CEST)
- INSEE/Postal code: 32301 /32350
- ^{1} French Land Register data, which excludes lakes, ponds, glaciers > 1 km^{2} (0.386 sq mi or 247 acres) and river estuaries.

Ordan-Larroque (French pronunciation: [ɔʁdɑ̃ laʁɔk]; Occitan: Ordan e La Ròca) is a commune in the Gers department in southwestern France.

== Geography ==
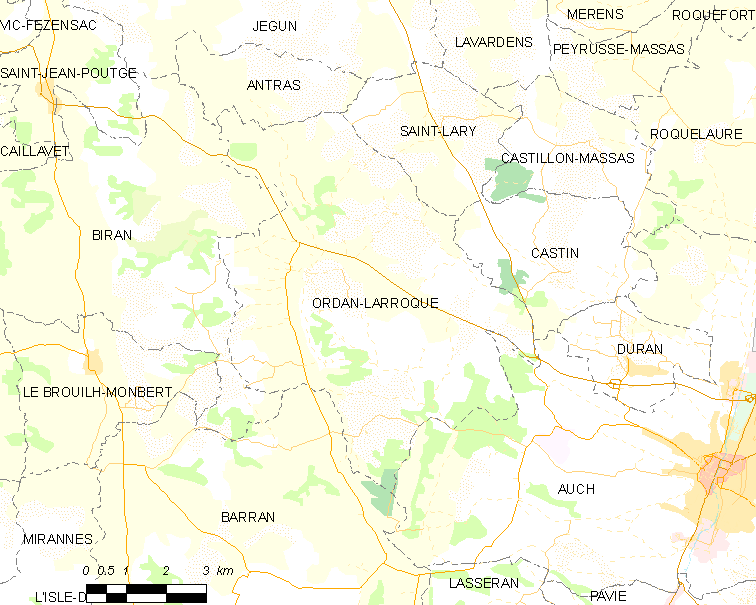
Ordan-Laroque and its surrounding communes

== Population ==
Historical population
Year	Pop.	±% p.a.
1968	468	—
1975	511	+1.26%
1982	620	+2.80%
1990	738	+2.20%
1999	774	+0.53%
2007	874	+1.53%
2012	940	+1.47%
2017	916	−0.52%
2023	858	−1.08%
Source: INSEE

== See also ==
- Communes of the Gers department
