= Bryan West (rugby) =

GB & England international rugby union & league footballer

- Born: Bryan Ronald West; 7 June 1948 (age 78) Northampton
- University: Loughborough University
- Occupation: Schoolteacher

Rugby union career
- Position: Flanker
Senior career
Years	Team	Apps	(Points)
–	Loughborough Students RUFC		
–	Northampton		
International career
Years	Team	Apps	(Points)
1968-70	England	8	(0)
–	British Lions	0	(0)
- Rugby league career

Playing information
- Position: Second-row
Club
Years	Team	Pld	T	G	FG	P
1970–72	Wakefield Trinity	30				3

Bryan West (born 7 June 1948) is a former England international rugby union and rugby league player.

He was capped eight times as a flanker for England between 1968 and 1970.

West was selected for the 1968 British Lions tour to South Africa but did not play in any of the international matches against South Africa.

He played club rugby for Northampton, and in 1970 moved north to play rugby league for Wakefield Trinity.

Bryan West was a teacher at Trinity School in Northampton.
