= John Novak (rugby union) =

England international rugby union player

- Full name: Michael John Novak
- Born: 27 September 1947 (age 79) Kineton, Warwickshire, England
- Height: 6 ft 3 in (191 cm)

Rugby union career
- Position: Wing
International career
Years	Team	Apps	(Points)
1970	England	3	(3)

Michael John Novak (born 27 September 1947) is an English-born professor of periodontics and former rugby union international for England. He has been based in the United States since the 1980s.

Novak was born in Kineton, Warwickshire, the son of a Czechoslovak soldier stationed in the area. The family later settled in Eastbourne and he attended Eastbourne Grammar, breaking into the Sussex county side at age 19.

A strongly built winger, Novak switched to Surrey after moving to London to study dentistry and played club rugby for local team Harlequins. It was from Harlequins that he was called into the England side and he was capped three times during the 1970 Five Nations Championship. He scored a try on debut against Wales at Twickenham Stadium.

== See also ==
- List of England national rugby union players
