= Tiny Naudé =

South African rugby union player

- Full name: Jacobus Pieter Naudé
- Born: 2 November 1936 Warrenton, South Africa
- Died: 28 December 2006 (aged 70) Somerset West, South Africa

Rugby union career
- Position: Lock
International career
Years	Team	Apps	(Points)
1963–68	South Africa	14	(47)

Jacobus Pieter Naudé (2 November 1936 – 28 December 2006) was a South African rugby union international.

Naudé was born in the town of Warrenton and attended Klerksdorp High School. Most of his provincial rugby was played for Western Province and his local Cape Town club was Hamilton RFC. He played in eight matches for Transvaal.

Between 1963 and 1968, Naudé represented the Springboks as a lock in 14 Test matches. He is best remembered for his match-winning penalty kick against the All Blacks in Christchurch in 1965, with three-minutes remaining. A win had been needed to keep the series alive and the muddy conditions as well as awkward angle made it a difficult kick.

Naudé worked for a period of time on the Western Transvaal gold mines and later for a chemical company. He died at a Somerset West hospital in 2006 at the age of 70, having fought Alzheimer's disease for several years.

== See also ==
- List of South Africa national rugby union players
