= Colin Grimshaw (rugby union) =

Rugby union player from Northern Ireland

- Born: 20 March 1947 (age 79) Belfast, Northern Ireland
- Height: 5 ft 8 in (173 cm)
- School: Methodist College Belfast
- University: Queen's University Belfast
- Occupation: Pharmacist

Rugby union career
- Position: Scrum-half
International career
| Years | Team | Apps | (Points) |
| 1969 | Ireland | 1 | (0) |

Colin Grimshaw (born 20 March 1947) is an Irish former international rugby union player.

Grimshaw was educated at Methodist College and Queen's University in his native Belfast.

A scrum-half, Grimshaw won an Ireland cap in 1969 while with Queen's University, coming on off the bench to replace Roger Young against England at Lansdowne Road. He otherwise found himself as an understudy to John Moloney and didn't get any further opportunities. In 1973, Grimshaw moved to England and played over 100 games for Coventry, which he captained for one season. He was one of three Ireland players to feature on postal stamps in 1974 to commemorate the Centenary of the Irish Rugby Football Union.

Grimshaw was a pharmacist by profession.

== See also ==
- List of Ireland national rugby union players
