= John Moroney =

Irish rugby union player

- Full name: John Christopher M. Moroney
- Born: 28 October 1945 Clogheen, Co. Tipperary, Ireland
- Died: 12 December 2009 (aged 64) Dunmore East, Co. Waterford, Ireland

Rugby union career
- Position: Fly-half / Wing
International career
Years	Team	Apps	(Points)
1968–69	Ireland	6	(20)

John Christopher M. Moroney (28 October 1945 — 12 December 2009) was an Irish rugby union international.

Moroney was born in the village of Clogheen in County Tipperary. He attended De La Salle College Waterford and Rockwell College, winning a Munster Schools Senior Cup title with the latter in 1964.

Mainly playing as an out-half or winger, Moroney spent his career with Garryowen, University College Dublin, London Irish and Munster, while gaining six Ireland caps in 1968 and 1969. He set a new Ireland individual points scoring record in the 1969 Five Nations opener against France at Lansdowne Road, with 14 points through a try, conversion and three penalties. As a Garryowen player, he was a member of three Munster Senior Cup winning sides, before his career was ended by a leg injury while playing for the club in the 1975 Munster Senior League final.

== See also ==
- List of Ireland national rugby union players
