= Roger Shackleton =

England international rugby union player

- Full name: Ian Roger Shackleton
- Born: 17 June 1948 (age 78) Shipley, Yorkshire, England
- School: Bradford Grammar School
- University: University of Cambridge

Rugby union career
- Position: Centre / Fly-half
International career
Years	Team	Apps	(Points)
1969–70	England	4	(3)

Ian Roger Shackleton (born 17 June 1948) is an English former international rugby union player.

Born in Shipley, Yorkshire, Shackleton was educated at Bradford Grammar School and played his early rugby with Harrogate, before competing in varsity rugby while attending the University of Cambridge.

Shackleton was capped four times by England as a fly-half, debuting in a win over the Springboks at Twickenham in 1969, then playing three matches in the 1970 Five Nations Championship.

During the early 1970s, Shackleton worked in France and played rugby for Stade Lavelanetien.

Shackleton competed with Richmond on his return to England, then finished his career back at Harrogate.

== See also ==
- List of England national rugby union players
