= Morris Ziff =

Morris Ziff (November 19, 1913 – August 22, 2005) was a physician, educator and researcher specializing in arthritic and rheumatic disorders, possibly best known for helping discover the rheumatoid factor.

Ziff was born in Brooklyn, New York and educated at New York University, where he was lab partners with Severo Ochoa, a Nobel Prize winner. He earned a doctorate in chemistry in addition to a medical degree. His work at University of Texas Southwestern Medical School beginning in 1958 led to his establishment of the school's rheumatology unit, which would become one of the most renowned units in the United States.

During his lifetime, Ziff was awarded the Heberden Medal, the Carol Nachman Prize in Rheumatology, and the Distinguished Service Award from the Arthritis Foundation. He was one of the first holders of an Arthritis Foundation Fellowship, awarded the First Gold Medal of the American College of Rheumatology, the Heberden Medal, and the Carol Nachman Prize in Rheumatology.

In 1981, he was named an Ashbel Smith professor, and retired as Chairman of Rheumatology, but continued to privately research and practice until 1999. At the time of his death by cardiac arrest, he was professor emeritus and held the Morris Ziff Professorship in Rheumatology.
