= Ken Plummer (rugby union) =

England international rugby union player

- Full name: Kenneth Clive Plummer
- Born: 17 January 1947 (age 79) Falmouth, Cornwall, England

Rugby union career
- Position: Wing
International career
Years	Team	Apps	(Points)
1969–76	England	4	(0)

Kenneth Clive Plummer (born 17 January 1947) is an English former rugby union international.

Plummer, born in Falmouth, Cornwall, was a winger and started his career at Cornish club Penryn RFC. After joining Bristol, he gained his first England cap in a 1969 Five Nations match against Wales, but was immediately discarded having seen his opposite winger Maurice Richards score four tries. Another opportunity didn't come until the 1976 Five Nations, where he featured in three of the matches. He was club captain of Bristol in the 1976–77 and 1977–78 seasons.

== See also ==
- List of England national rugby union players
