= Gordon Connell (rugby union) =

Scottish rugby union player (1944–2025)

- Born: Gordon Colin Connell; 3 October 1944
- Died: 9 August 2025 (aged 80)

Rugby union career
- Position: Scrum-half
Amateur team(s)
Years	Team	Apps	(Points)
- Trinity Academicals RFC
- London Scottish
International career
Years	Team	Apps	(Points)
1968–1970	Scotland	5	

Gordon Colin Connell (3 October 1944 – 9 August 2025) was a Scotland international rugby union player.

He was capped five times for Scotland as a scrum-half between 1968 and 1970. He scored one drop goal for Scotland.

Connell was called up as a late replacement for the 1968 British Lions tour to South Africa. With both scrum halves (Gareth Edwards and Roger Young) injured, he played in the last three games on tour including the 4th Test against South Africa.

He played club rugby for Trinity Academicals and later London Scottish. He was also the first player to be replaced in an international match (at Murrayfield) when (Ian McCrae of Gordonians and Scotland) came on to replace him.

Connell died 9 August 2025.
