= John O'Shea (rugby union) =

British Lions & Wales international rugby union player (1940–2024)

- Born: John Patrick O'Shea; 2 June 1940 Weston-Super-Mare, England
- Died: 24 April 2024 (aged 83) Australia
- School: Lewis School Pengam
- Occupation: Bank Manager

Rugby union career
- Position: Prop
Amateur team(s)
Years	Team	Apps	(Points)
- Penzance Newlyn
–	Cardiff RFC		
–	Newbridge RFC		
–	Cardiff RFC		
–	Barbarian F.C.		
–	Monmouthshire		
–	Cornwall		
International career
Years	Team	Apps	(Points)
1967–1968	Wales	5	(0)
1968	British Lions	1	(0)

John Patrick O'Shea (2 June 1940 – 24 April 2024) was a Wales international rugby union player.

== Career ==
Educated at Lewis School Pengam, along with John Dawes, he was capped five times for Wales as a prop between 1967 and 1968.

O'Shea was selected for the 1968 British Lions tour to South Africa and played in the first international against South Africa. In the match against Eastern Transvaal at Springs he became the first Lion ever to be sent off for foul play, after throwing a punch. He was then hit by a spectator while walking off which resulted in a brawl. Later in the tour while playing against Rhodesia, he became the first Lions prop to score two tries in a game.

O'Shea played club rugby for Cardiff between 1963 and 1970, becoming club captain in his final year. In total he played 213 games for them and scored 19 tries.

== Personal life and death ==
John Patrick O'Shea was born in Weston-Super-Mare, England, on 2 June 1940.

O'Shea died from pneumonia on 24 April 2024, at the age of 83.
