= Keith Savage (rugby union) =

British Lions & England international rugby union player

- Born: Keith Frederick Savage; 24 August 1940 (age 86) Warwick
- University: Loughborough University

Rugby union career
- Position: Wing
Senior career
Years	Team	Apps	(Points)
- Loughborough Colleges
–	Northampton		
–	Leamington RFC		
International career
Years	Team	Apps	(Points)
1966-1968	England	13	(Pts:3;)
1966-1968	British Lions	4	(0)

Keith Frederick Savage (born 24 August 1940) is a former England international rugby union player.

He was capped thirteen times on the wing for England between 1966 and 1968. He scored one try for England. He was selected for the 1966 British Lions tour to Australia and New Zealand and the 1968 British Lions tour to South Africa. He did not play in any international matches on the 1966 tour but did play in all four internationals against South Africa in 1968.He is Lion number 453

He played club rugby for Northampton and Leamington RFC.

Savage is now an English teacher in Johannesburg, South Africa.
