= Des Scott =

Rugby union player from Northern Ireland

- Full name: Robert Desmond Scott
- Born: 2 October 1941 (age 85) Belfast, Northern Ireland

Rugby union career
- Position: Wing
International career
Years	Team	Apps	(Points)
1967–68	Ireland	5	(0)

Robert Desmond Scott (born 2 October 1941) is an Irish former international rugby union player.

A Belfast dentist, Scott played rugby with Queen's University during his tertiary studies and was a member of the side that claimed the 1966/67 Ulster Senior League title. He also featured in Ulster's draw against the Wallabies that season.

Scott was capped five times as a winger by Ireland across the 1967 and 1968 Five Nations.

== See also ==
- List of Ireland national rugby union players
