= 1971 France rugby union tour of South Africa =

The 1971 France rugby union tour of South Africa was a series of matches played by the France national rugby union team in South Africa in June 1971. The French team drew one and lost one of their international matches against the South Africa national rugby union team.

== Results ==
Scores and results list France's points tally first.

	Date	Opponent	Location	Result	Score
Match 1	22 May	Eastern Transvaal	Springs	Won	22–13
Match 2	26 May	Western Transvaal	Potchefstroom	Won	50–0
Match 3	29 May	Transvaal	Johannesburg	Won	20–14
Match 4	31 May	Border	East London	Won	30–6
Match 5	5 June	Western Province	Cape Town	Won	21–6
Match 6	8 June	South West Africa	South West Stadium, Windhoek	Won	35–6
Match 7	12 June	SOUTH AFRICA	Free State Stadium, Bloemfontein	Lost	9–22
Match 8	15 June	North East Cape	Cradock	Won	33–17
Match 9	19 June	SOUTH AFRICA	Kings Park Stadium, Durban	Drew	8–8
