= Laurie Daniel =

Wales international rugby union player (1942–2023)

Laurance Thomas David Daniel (5 March 1942 – 14 March 2023) was a Wales international rugby union player.

Daniel was born on 5 March 1942. He made his debut for Wales on 7 February 1970 versus Scotland, scoring a try in an 18 points to 9 win for Wales. He played club rugby for Newport RFC and Pontypool RFC.

Following his playing career, he was a PE teacher at West Monmouth School in Pontypool.

Daniel died on 14 March 2023, at the age of 81.
