= Billy Raybould =

Wales international rugby union footballer

- Born: William Henry Raybould; 6 May 1944 (age 82) Cardiff, Wales
- School: Cathays High School
- University: Emmanuel College, Cambridge University
- Occupation(s): Teacher; Schools' inspector

Rugby union career
- Position: Centre
Amateur team(s)
Years	Team	Apps	(Points)
- Cathays HSOB
–	Cambridge University		
–	London Welsh RFC		
–	Newport RFC		
–	Bridgend RFC		
–	Cardiff RFC		
–	Barbarian F.C.		
International career
Years	Team	Apps	(Points)
1967–1970	Wales	11	(3)

William Henry Raybould (born 6 May 1944) is a former Wales international rugby union player.

He was capped eleven times as a centre for Wales between 1967 and 1970, winning his last cap as a replacement. He scored one drop goal for Wales.

Raybould was selected for the 1968 British Lions tour to South Africa but did not play in any of the internationals against South Africa.

He represented Cambridge in the 1966 Varsity Match and played club rugby for Cardiff, London Welsh and Newport
