= Roger Bourgarel =

French rugby union player (born 1947)

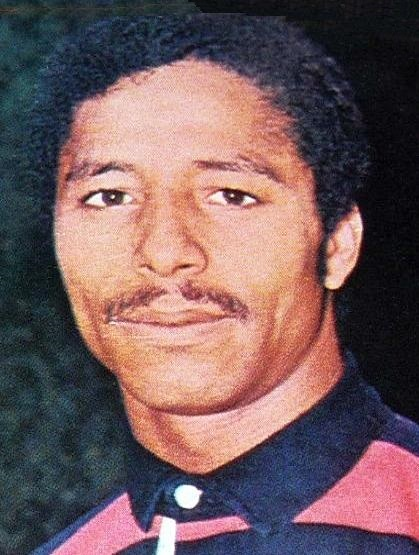
- Born: 21 April 1947 (age 79) Toulouse, France
- Height: 5 ft 8 in (173 cm)
- Weight: 166 lb (75 kg)

Rugby union career
- Position: Wing
International career
Years	Team	Apps	(Points)
1969–73	France	9	(3)

Roger Bourgarel (born 21 April 1947) is a French former rugby union international.

== Biography ==
Born in Toulouse, Bourgarel was a speedy winger of Guadeloupean descent known as “La Flèche Noire”, which translates to "The Black Arrow". He played his club rugby for hometown club Stade Toulousain.

Bourgarel, capped nine times by France, played both Tests against the Springboks on the 1971 tour of apartheid South Africa, after his selection had caused much political controversy. The president of the French federation, Albert Ferrasse, had insisted on Bourgarel's place in the squad, a position supported by his South African counterpart Danie Craven. He became the first black rugby player to be granted permission by the South African government to tour the country.

Since 2020, Bourgarel has served as the mayor of the town of Prunet in Haute-Garonne.

== See also ==
- List of France national rugby union players
