= Tommy Elliot =

Scotland international rugby union player (born 1941)

- Born: Thomas Grieve Elliot; 1 March 1941 (age 85) Langholm, Scotland

Rugby union career
- Position: Flanker
Amateur team(s)
Years	Team	Apps	(Points)
- Langholm
Provincial / State sides
Years	Team	Apps	(Points)
- South of Scotland
International career
Years	Team	Apps	(Points)
1968-70	Scotland	5	(0)

Tommy Elliot (born 1 March 1941) is a former Scotland international rugby union player.

== Rugby Union career ==
=== Amateur career ===
He played for Langholm.

=== Provincial career ===
He played for South of Scotland District.

=== International career ===
He had 5 caps for Scotland between 1968 and 1970.

He played for a combined Scotland - Ireland side to mark the English rugby union's centenary in 1970. The game against a Wales - England side ended in a 14–14 draw.
