= Bill Brown (rugby union) =

Rugby union player from Northern Ireland

- Full name: William James Brown
- Born: 19 August 1943 (age 83) Belfast, Northern Ireland

Rugby union career
- Position: Wing
International career
| Years | Team | Apps | (Points) |
| 1970 | Ireland | 4 | (3) |

William James Brown (born 19 August 1943) is a former Ireland rugby union international from Northern Ireland.

Born in Belfast, Brown was a winger for Malone and Ulster, capped four times for Ireland in 1970. He debuted in Ireland's draw against the Springboks at Lansdowne Road and featured in three Five Nations fixtures, missing only the England match. Later in the year, he toured Argentina with the national team and suffered a broken leg in a tour match.

== See also ==
- List of Ireland national rugby union players
