= Tony Bucknall =

English rugby union player (born 1945)

Anthony Launce Bucknall (born 7 June 1945) is a former England international rugby union player and captain.

He was capped ten times as a flanker for England between 1969 and 1971 and captained England in one international, against Wales in January 1971.

He played for Oxford in the 1965 and 1966 Varsity matches and played club rugby for Richmond.

Sporting positions
Preceded by Bob Taylor	English National Rugby Union Captain; 1971	Succeeded by John Spencer
