= Jean Salut =

France international rugby union player

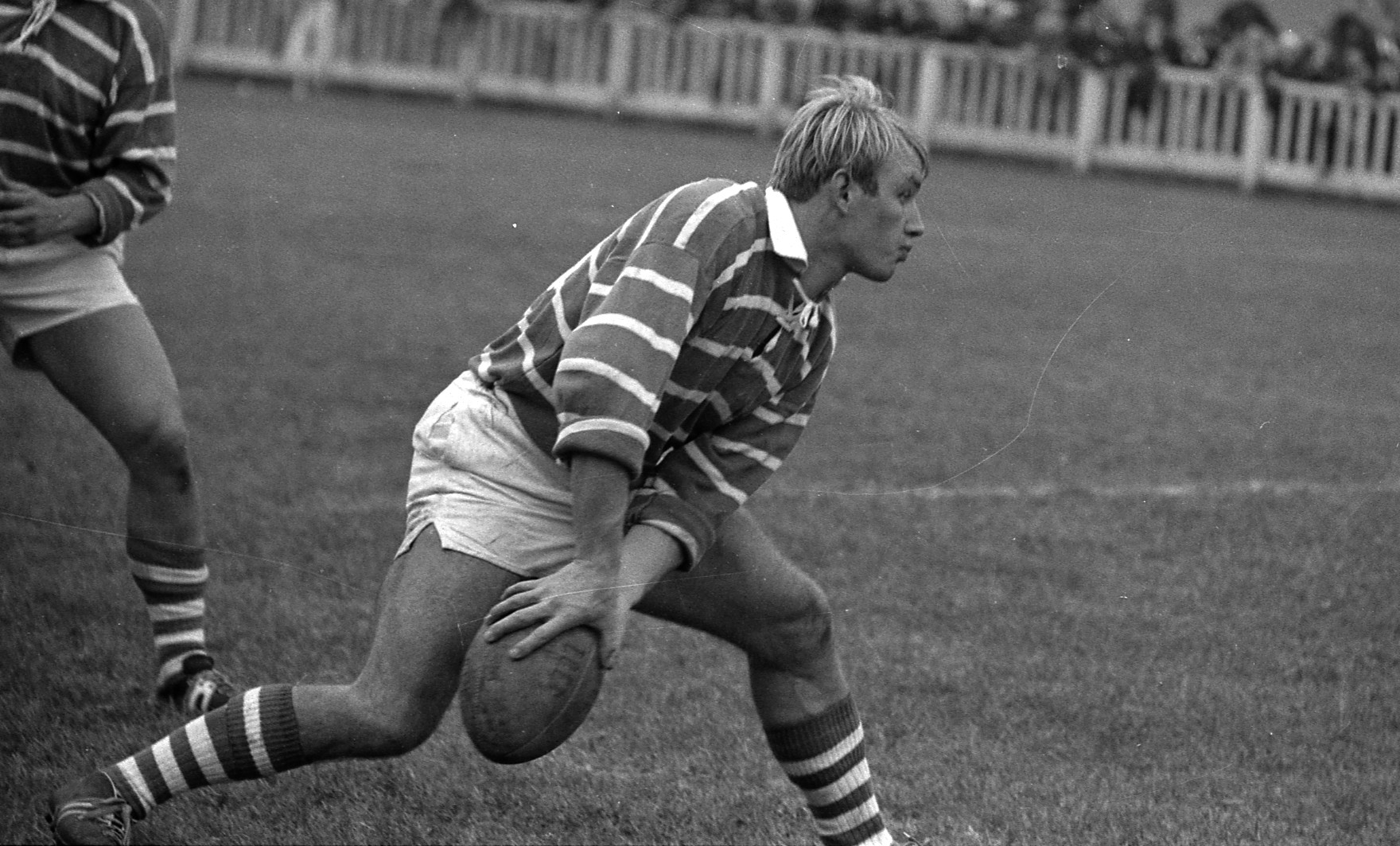
- Salut in 1965
- Born: 14 April 1943 Beaumont-de-Lomagne, France
- Died: 5 September 2025 (aged 82) Saint-Lys, France
- Height: 5 ft 10 in (178 cm)
- Weight: 194 lb (88 kg)

Rugby union career
- Position: Wing–forward
International career
Years	Team	Apps	(Points)
1966–69	France	7	(3)

Jean Salut (14 April 1943 – 5 September 2025) was a French international rugby union player.

== Biography ==
Born in Beaumont-de-Lomagne, Salut was capped seven times for France as a wing–forward while based with Toulouse club TOEC in the late 1960s. This included France's wins over Ireland and England in their 1968 Five Nations grand slam. He also played a Test match against the All Blacks at Lancaster Park. During the 1969 Five Nations, Salut was a last second withdrawal from a match against Scotland when he injured his ankle running onto the ground.

Salut was a physiotherapist by profession. He died in Saint-Lys, France on 5 September 2025, at the age of 82.

== See also ==
- List of France national rugby union players
