= Jerry Walsh =

Irish rugby union player (1938–1992)

Jeremiah Charles Walsh (3 November 1938 – 28 September 1992) was an Ireland international rugby union footballer.

Born in Cork, he was capped twenty-six times by Ireland as a centre between 1960 and 1967. That Walsh's prowess was mainly defensive was shown by his scoring record: it was not until his 26th appearance that he managed a try for Ireland. But the occasion, that famous victory at Sydney Cricket Ground, could scarcely have been bettered. With that he retired, in order better to pursue his career as a doctor.

Walsh was selected for the 1966 British & Irish Lions tour to Australia and New Zealand, but did not play in any of the internationals as he returned home early from Australia due to the serious illness of his father . He also toured South Africa and Australia with Ireland in 1961 and 1967 respectively. He played club rugby for University College Cork RFC and Sundays Well.

Walsh died on 28 September 1992, at the age of 53.
