= André Quilis =

France international rugby union player (1941–2020)

- Born: 28 October 1941 Coursan, France
- Died: 19 November 2020 (aged 79) Narbonne, France
- Height: 1.79 m (5 ft 10 in)
- Weight: 81 kg (179 lb)

Rugby union career
- Position: Flanker
Senior career
Years	Team	Apps	(Points)
1962–1971	RC Narbonne		
1971–1972	Cuxac d’Aude		
International career
Years	Team	Apps	(Points)
1967–1971	France		
Coaching career
- Years: Team
- 1971–1972: Cuxac d'Aude
- 1972–1973: US Quillan
- 1975–1981: USA Perpignan
- 1988–1989: RC Nîmes
- 1989–1994: Montpellier Hérault Rugby
- 1995–2001: France A

André Quilis (28 October 1941 – 19 November 2020) was a French rugby union player. He played at the flanker position.

== Biography ==
Quilis played for RC Narbonne from 1962 to 1971. With the club, he won the Challenge Yves du Manoir in 1968 and the Trophée rugby Panache Pernod in 1969. He played in five games for the National Team from 1967 to 1971, including the 1971 Six Nations Championship. He was a player-coach for Cuxac d'Aude from 1971 to 1972 and then coached until his retirement in 2001.
