= David Powell (rugby union) =

English rugby union player and coach

David Lewes "Piggy" Powell (born 17 May 1942) is a former England international rugby union player.

He was capped eleven times by England as a prop between 1966 and 1971.

Powell was selected for the 1966 British Lions tour to Australia and New Zealand, but did not play in any of the internationals.

He played club rugby for Long Buckby RFC and Northampton, making 370 appearances for the club over 15 seasons from 1963 to 1978, including four seasons as captain. He coached the Northampton team in the mid-1980 and then became head groundsman at Northampton's Franklin's Gardens ground until his retirement in 2015. Powell is one of the members of Northampton's Hall of Fame.
