= Gérard Viard =

France international rugby union player

- Born: 19 May 1945 (age 81) Saint-Jean-de-Saucie, France
- Height: 6 ft 2 in (188 cm)
- Weight: 208 lb (94 kg)

Rugby union career
- Position: Flanker
International career
Years	Team	Apps	(Points)
1969–71	France	5	(0)

Gérard Viard (born 19 May 1945) is a French former international rugby union player.

Raised in Sigean, Viard was a flanker and started out with the juniors at RC Narbonne in 1963, before making his senior debut two years later. He formed a back row with Walter Spanghero and André Quilis for much of his time at the club.

Viard appeared sporadically for France between 1969 and 1971, gaining five caps. He took part in three Five Nations campaigns and was a squad member on France's 1967 tour of South Africa.

From 1974 to 1977, Viard played with US Bressane as captain–coach.

== See also ==
- List of France national rugby union players
