= Jean Sillières =

French rugby union player (born 1946)

- Born: 15 November 1946 (age 79) Marciac, France
- Height: 5 ft 11 in (180 cm)
- Weight: 172 lb (78 kg)

Rugby union career
- Position: Winger
International career
| Years | Team | Apps | (Points) |
| 1968–72 | France | 8 | (10) |

Jean Sillières (born 15 November 1946) is a French former rugby union international.

Born in Marciac, Gers, Sillières was a speedy winger, clocked at 10.8 seconds in the 100 metres as a junior. He earned eight France caps between 1968 and 1972, scoring three Test tries. In the 1972–73 season, Sillières was one of the best players for Tarbes Stadoceste in their Brennus Shield-winning campaign.

== See also ==
- List of France national rugby union players
