= Rodger Arneil =

British Lions & Scotland International Rugby union Player

Rodger James Arneil
- Born: Rodger James Arneil; 1 May 1944 (age 82) Edinburgh, Scotland
- Occupation(s): Scottish Woollen Export Manager; Managing Director of AMF; Sports UK distributor

Rugby union career
- Position: Flanker
Amateur team(s)
Years	Team	Apps	(Points)
1965–1967	Edinburgh Academicals		
- Düsseldorf Dragons RFC
1968–1970	Leicester Tigers		
1969	Hartlepool Rovers		
1971–1973	Northampton Saints		
1973	Frankfurt 1880 RFC		
- Barbarians
Provincial / State sides
Years	Team	Apps	(Points)
- Edinburgh District
- Durham County
International career
Years	Team	Apps	(Points)
1968–1972	Scotland	22	
1968, 1971	British and Irish Lions	4	

Rodger Arneil (born 1 May 1944) is a former Scotland international rugby union player. He was played on two British and Irish Lions tours - to South Africa in 1968 and New Zealand in 1971, the second tour as a replacement.

== Rugby Union career ==
=== Amateur career ===
He played club rugby for both Edinburgh Academicals and Leicester Tigers.

=== Provincial career ===
Arneil captained the 1967 Edinburgh and District team.
He also captained the 1969 Durham County side.

=== International career ===
==== Scotland ====
===== R. F. U. Centenary Match 1970 =====
Scotland beat England in both matches played at Murrayfield and Twickenham.

===== Scotland Touring =====
Arneil was a member of the 1969 Scotland team that toured Argentina. This tour and internationals were not classed as full, thus no caps were awarded. There were two ‘internationals’ played against an Argentine XV. Scotland lost the first and won the second.
1st International Arg 11 v Sco 3
2nd International Arg 3 v Sco 6
Arneil captained Scotland in the second match v Argentina which was won 6 v 3.
Arneil was a member of the 1970 Scotland team that toured Australia. The one test played on this tour was classed as a full test. Other matches were played on this tour. Scotland won the Test and the score was Australia 23 v Scotland 3.
1 Test Aus 23 v Sco 3

==== British and Irish Lions ====
Rodger Arneil was a member of the 1968 touring team to South Africa and played in all 4 Tests. He was selected for the 1971 British Lions tour to New Zealand. Due to business commitments he joined the tour following the second test.

==== Barbarians ====
Arneil played 15 times for the Barbarians including the 1969 Barbarian tour to South Africa.
Scored first try Baa Baas vs South Africa 1970.
