= Pierre Biémouret =

French rugby union player (1943–2022)

- Born: 11 April 1943 Mas-d'Auvignon, German-occupied France
- Died: 23 November 2022 (aged 79) Toulouse, France
- Height: 1.85 m (6 ft 1 in)

Rugby union career
- Position: Flanker
Senior career
Years	Team	Apps	(Points)
1965–1972	SU Agen	?	(?)
1972–1975	AS Fleurance	?	(?)
1975–1978	SA Condom	?	(?)
International career
Years	Team	Apps	(Points)
1969–1973	France	19	(4)

Pierre Biémouret (11 April 1943 – 23 November 2022) was a French rugby union player who played as a flanker.

== Biography ==
Biémouret worked as a farmer. From 1969 to 1973, he was a member of the French national team, playing his first match on 22 February 1969 against England. His last national team game came against Ireland on 14 April 1973. He played in two test matches in South Africa in 1971. He began his professional career with SU Agen in 1965, which won the French rugby union championship in 1966.

From 1972 to 1975, Biémouret played for AS Fleurance. He captained a game against South Africa during a tournament in France in 1974.

The following season, Biémouret became a player-coach for SA Condom, which won the Second Division in 1978. After winning this title, he retired from playing rugby. In the early 1990s, he coached the Italian team Parma F.C.

Biémouret's wife, Gisèle, served as a member of the French National Assembly from 2007 to 2022.

Pierre Biémouret died in Toulouse on 23 November 2022, at the age of 79.
