= Keith Jarrett (rugby) =

Wales international rugby union & league footballer

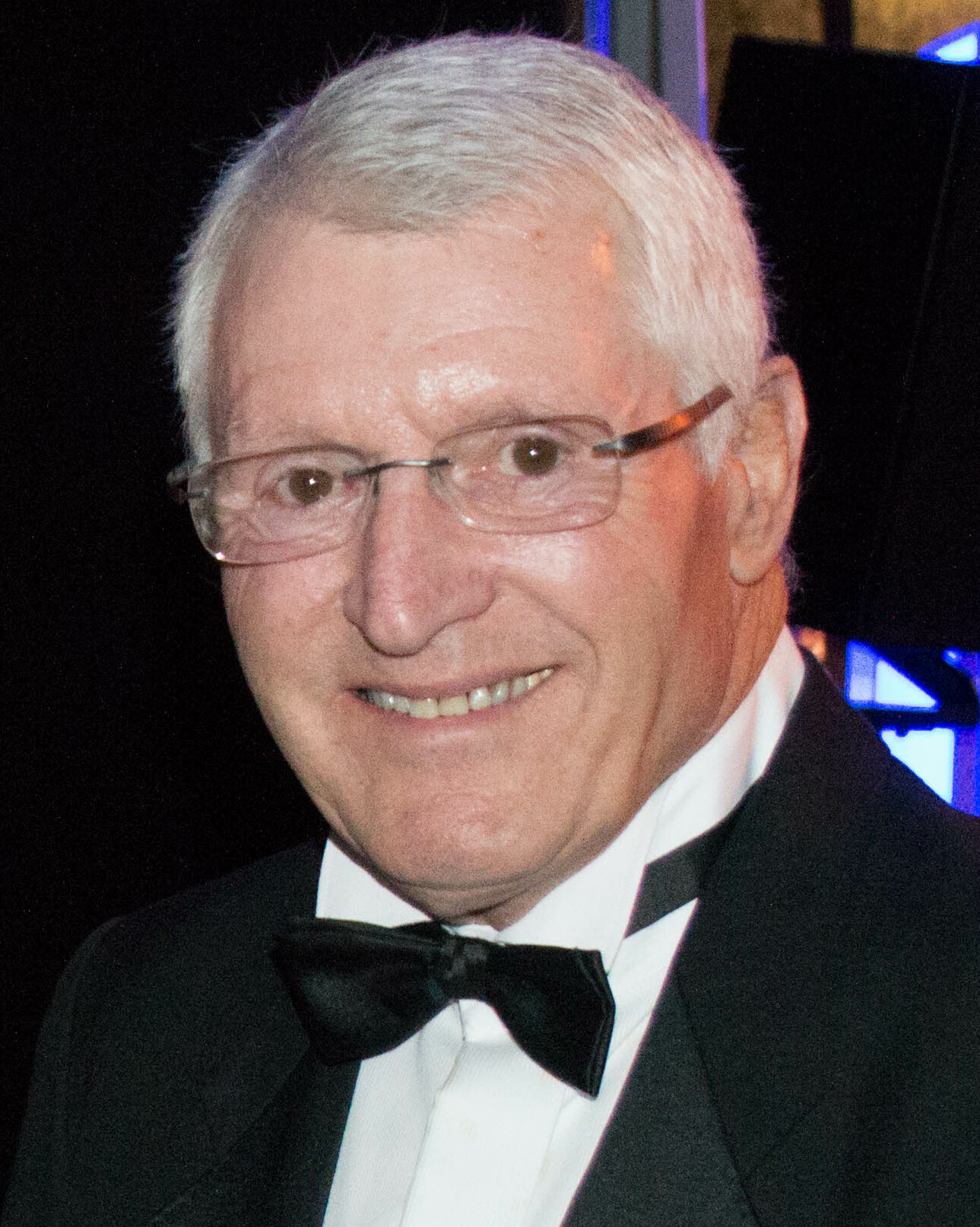
- Keith Jarrett 2014
- Born: Keith Stanley Jarrett; 18 May 1948 (age 78) Newport, Wales
- Height: 6 ft 0 in (1.83 m)
- Weight: 13 st 1 lb (83 kg)
- School: Monmouth School

Rugby union career
- Position: Centre
Amateur team(s)
Years	Team	Apps	(Points)
1966	Abertillery RFC		
1966–70	Newport RFC		
- Monmouthshire
International career
Years	Team	Apps	(Points)
1967–69	Wales	10	(73)
1968	British Lions	0	(0)
- Rugby league career

Playing information
- Position: Back
Club
Years	Team	Pld	T	G	FG	P
1969–73	Barrow	92				559
Representative
Years	Team	Pld	T	G	FG	P
1970	Wales	2				3

Keith Jarrett (born 18 May 1948) is a Welsh former dual-code international rugby union and rugby league footballer who played in the 1960s and 1970s. He played representative rugby union for the British Lions and for Wales, where he set point scoring records, and Monmouthshire, and at club level for Abertillery RFC and Newport RFC, as a centre, i.e. number 12 or 13. The teenaged Jarrett made a memorable international debut for Wales against England in 1967, scoring 19 of Wales's 34 points. He also played representative rugby league for Wales, and at club level for Barrow.

== Early career ==
Jarrett was born in Newport, Monmouthshire, the son of former Glamorgan cricketer Hal Jarrett, and attended Monmouth School. Like his father, he played cricket for Glamorgan County Cricket Club. In 1966 Keith Jarrett he played his first official rugby union match for Newport against Ebbw Vale, shortly after leaving school.

== Cricket ==
Jarrett played for Glamorgan Second XI from 1965 to 1967, appearing in two first-class matches in 1967 – one each against the Indian and Pakistani tourists. He was a middle order bat and change right arm seam bowler.

== International rugby career ==
Jarrett played his first international for Wales on 15 April 1967 against England, aged eighteen years. He had been selected at full back even though he had never played senior rugby in that position. Newport were asked to play him at full back against Newbridge on the weekend before the international to give him some experience. He did not seem to be much of a success in his new position and at half time, his captain David Watkins, switched him to centre. The following week Jarrett played in his first international and scored a breathtaking try. England won a line-out in their own 25 (as it was then). The ball was passed down the line to English centre, Colin McFadyean, who kicked towards the halfway line. The ball bounced once and was seemingly going in to touch. Instead, Jarrett took the ball without breaking his stride, and outflanked the astonished England defence to score in the left corner. He converted his own try from just inside the touchline. Besides scoring a try, he kicked two penalty goals and five conversions for a total of 19 points, equalling a Welsh record. His performance on the field was so impressive that the match has been known ever since as the Keith Jarrett match and he made the cover of Rugby World magazine two months later. The try has been highly-ranked in several popular polls to select the greatest Welsh tries.

In 1968 he set a club record of 30 points for Newport against Penarth, and was selected for the 1968 British Lions tour to South Africa.

Jarrett played for Wales at rugby union ten times in all, making his final appearance against Australia on 21 June 1969 during the Wales tour of New Zealand and Australia.

== Later career ==
On his return from tour in 1969, Jarrett joined rugby league club Barrow for a signing-on fee of £14,000 (based on increases in average earnings, this would be approximately £380,000 in 2016). He was also selected for the Welsh national rugby league side, before he had played his first match for Barrow. He was later transferred to Wigan, although he did not play for them.

Jarrett's rugby career was cut short in 1973, aged just 25, when he suffered a stroke resulting from a haemorrhage.

== See also ==
- List of cricket and rugby league players
