= Barry Llewelyn =

Wales international rugby union footballer

- Born: Donald Barry Llewelyn; 6 January 1948 (age 78) Ashton-in-Makerfield, Greater Manchester, England
- Height: 6 ft 2 in (189 cm)
- Weight: 16 st 3 lb (103 kg)

Rugby union career
- Position: Prop
Amateur team(s)
Years	Team	Apps	(Points)
1968–1970	Newport RFC		
–	Carmarthen Athletic		
–	Hendy RFC		
–	Newbridge RFC		
–	Loughborough College		
International career
Years	Team	Apps	(Points)
1970–1972	Wales	13	(3)

Donald Barry Llewelyn (born 6 January 1948) is a retired Welsh rugby union player who gained 13 caps for Wales as a prop between 1970 and 1972.

Barry was born in Ashton, Lancashire and educated at Llanelli Grammar School. He began his first-class rugby union career at Llanelli, and joined Newport RFC in the 1968–69 season while studying at Caerleon College of Education. He made his Newport debut in a 6–5 win at Pontypool on 13 November 1968. He made his Wales debut on 24 January 1970 against South Africa and gained 13 caps in total, 5 with Newport and 8 after he returned to Llanelli in the 1970–71 season. In his two seasons at Newport (1968–69 and 1969/70) he made 39 appearances and scored 6 tries.

Llewelyn also played for Carmarthen Athletic, Hendy, Newbridge, Loughborough College and the Barbarians.

== Wales ==
In 1970 he made his debut for Wales against South Africa. He scored his first and only try for Wales against Scotland in 1972. He went on and made 13 consecutive caps until a knee injury in 1972 interrupted his career - he never played for Wales again.
