= Peter Larter =

England international rugby union player

Peter John Larter (born 7 September 1944 (age 81)) is a former England international rugby union player.

== Career ==
He was capped twenty-four times as a lock for England between 1967 and 1973, scoring one try and one penalty for England.

Larter was selected for the 1968 British Lions tour to South Africa and played in one of the four international matches against South Africa.

He played club rugby for Northampton while based at RAF North Luffenham and represented the Royal Air Force & Combined Services at rugby union.

Notable former rugby players from RAF North Luffenham include Sir Augustus Walker RAF & England and Martin Whitcombe Leicester Tigers & England 'B' international.

During 1977 - 78, Peter Larter played for Stafford, his first game being for the 4th XV, he was so modest that when he turned up at the Club looking for a game, he did not say who he was. On several Friday evenings, the club would receive a phone call from Northampton, asking if they could release him to play for them the next day.
