= Sandy Hinshelwood =

British Lions & Scotland international rugby union player

Alexander James Watt Hinshelwood (born 23 March 1942 (age 83)) is a former Scotland international rugby union player.

He was capped twenty-one times for Scotland as a wing between 1966 and 1970. He scored five tries for Scotland.

Hinshelwood was selected for the 1966 British Lions tour to Australia and New Zealand and the 1968 British Lions tour to South Africa. He played in two tests against the All Blacks on the 1966 tour, scoring one try, and in one test, which was drawn, against South Africa in 1968.

He played club rugby for London Scottish. His son, Ben Hinshelwood, is also a Scotland rugby union international.
