= Bob Taylor (rugby union, born 1942) =

British Lions & England international rugby union player

- Born: 30 April 1942 (age 84) Northampton, Northamptonshire, England
- Height: 1.87 m (6 ft 2 in)
- Weight: 92 kg (14 st 7 lb; 203 lb)
- University: King Alfred's College

Rugby union career
- Position: Flanker
International career
Years	Team	Apps	(Points)
1966–1971	England	16	
1968	British Lions	2	

Robert Bainbridge Taylor (born 30 April 1942) is a former England rugby player and past president of the Rugby Football Union. He is from Northampton, England, and studied at King Alfred's College (now University of Winchester) from 1960–1963.

He was a flanker for England (between 1966 and 1971) and the British Lions, serving as England/Wales captain in the RFU centenary match in 1970 and winning 16 England caps. He captained England in one international. He was also the Northampton coach and a referee for East Midlands.

Taylor was a PE and mathematics teacher at Wellingborough Grammar School from 1964 until 1975. He was PE teacher at Lings Upper School in Northampton from 1975

In 1995 he was appointed Hon Secretary of Northampton RFC and served as president 1993–95. He has represented Northampton and the East Midlands on numerous committees and has served on several national committees. He was appointed to serve for one year as President of the Rugby Football Union in July 2007.

Sporting positions
Preceded by Bob Hiller	English National Rugby Union Captain; 1971	Succeeded by Tony Bucknall
Preceded by Bob Rogers	Rugby Football Union President; 2007-08	Succeeded by Brian Williams
