= Gerald Davies =

British Lions & Wales international rugby union player (born 1945)

Sir Gerald Davies CBE DL
- Born: Thomas Gerald Reames Davies; 7 February 1945 (age 81) Llansaint, Wales
- School: Queen Elizabeth Grammar School, Carmarthen
- University: Loughborough College; Emmanuel College, Cambridge; Cardiff University

Rugby union career
- Position: Wing/centre
Amateur team(s)
Years	Team	Apps	(Points)
1960s	Kidwelly		
1960s–1965	Llanelli		
1963–1966	Loughborough Colleges		
1965–1968	Cardiff		
1966–1977	Barbarians		
1968–1974	London Welsh		
1968–1971	Cambridge University		
1974-1980s	Cardiff		
International career
Years	Team	Apps	(Points)
1966–1978	Wales	46	(72)
1968–1971	British Lions	5	(9)

Sir Thomas Gerald Reames Davies CBE DL (born 7 February 1945) is a Welsh former rugby union wing who played international rugby for Wales between 1966 and 1978 and was selected for two British Lions tours. He is one of a small group of Welsh players to have won three Grand Slams.

== Early life ==
Born in Llansaint, Carmarthenshire, under the local coal miners scholarship scheme he studied at Loughborough University, before studying at Emmanuel College, Cambridge, and appearing for the University rugby team. Davies taught at Christ's Hospital in Horsham, Sussex from 1971 to 1974 when he took up a post with the Sports Council for Wales.

== Rugby career ==
Davies played club rugby for Cardiff RFC and London Welsh. He captained Cardiff for three seasons in the 1970s, including a 1977–78 Welsh Cup game against Pontypool when he scored four tries (beating his marker and near namesake Gareth Davies on each occasion) to earn his side a 16–11 win.

He made his international debut on Saturday, 3 December 1966 against Australia in Cardiff, where Wales lost 14–11. He was to face the Wallabies again in his final appearance for Wales in 1978, this time in Sydney, again a loss. All in all, he was capped 46 times for his country. Davies was switched from his original position of centre to the right wing by Wales coach Clive Rowlands on their 1969 tour of Australia and New Zealand, and thereafter played in that position.

Davies toured with the British Lions in 1968 and 1971 and was part of the group of Welsh 70s legends, ranking in rugby history alongside Gareth Edwards, Barry John, J. P. R. Williams, Phil Bennett and Bobby Windsor. A superb attacking player, he has been called one of the best wingers rugby has ever seen. Davies is often remembered for a try – one of 20 in 46 Tests – in the 1971 Five Nations match against Scotland. The Scots were leading before Davies scored in the corner in the last minute. Backrower John Taylor then kicked his famous conversion to steal victory.

Invited to join the 1974 Lions Tour of South Africa, Davies turned the opportunity down on his personal uncomfortable position at the consequences and realities of apartheid.

== Welsh & Lions Honours summary ==
For Wales: 46 Internationals, of which Wales won 29, lost 14 and drew 3 (points for 758, points against 507). 20 tries, 8 of them before the value of a try was raised to four points in the 1971–72 season (72 points in all).

For the British Lions: 5 Internationals of which the Lions won two, lost two and drew one (points for 54, points against 53). Davies scored three tries for the Lions during Test games, all of them on the 1971 tour to New Zealand (9 points).

== After retirement ==
After retiring as a player, Davies became a journalist, writing on rugby matters for The Times. He sat on Tasker Watkins committee to reform Welsh rugby. He became chairman of the Wales Youth Agency, and in the 2003 New Year Honours he was appointed a Commander of the Order of the British Empire (CBE) "for services to Young People and to Rugby in Wales."

Davies holds Honorary Fellowships from the University of Wales, Lampeter; the University of Wales, Aberystwyth; and Wrexham Glyndŵr University. He was awarded an Honorary Fellowship from Cardiff University in a graduation ceremony held on 15 July 2008. On 18 July 2008, he received an honorary doctorate from Loughborough University for services to sport and journalism, and has also received an honorary doctorate from Swansea University. He was also appointed a Deputy Lieutenant (DL) of Gwent in 1998.

In November 2007 he was announced as the manager of the 2009 British & Irish Lions tour to South Africa. Davies was elected to the post of President of the Welsh Rugby Union in September 2019 and took up the role in November 2019. In October 2023, Davies was replaced as President of the WRU by former Director of Rugby, Terry Cobner. Davies was knighted in the 2025 New Year Honours "for services to Rugby Union, and to voluntary and charitable service in Wales".

== Bibliography ==
- Davies, Gerald (1979). Gerald Davies – An Autobiography. London: George Allen & Unwin. ISBN 0-04-796052-3.
