= Barry John =

British Lions & Wales international rugby union player (1945–2024)

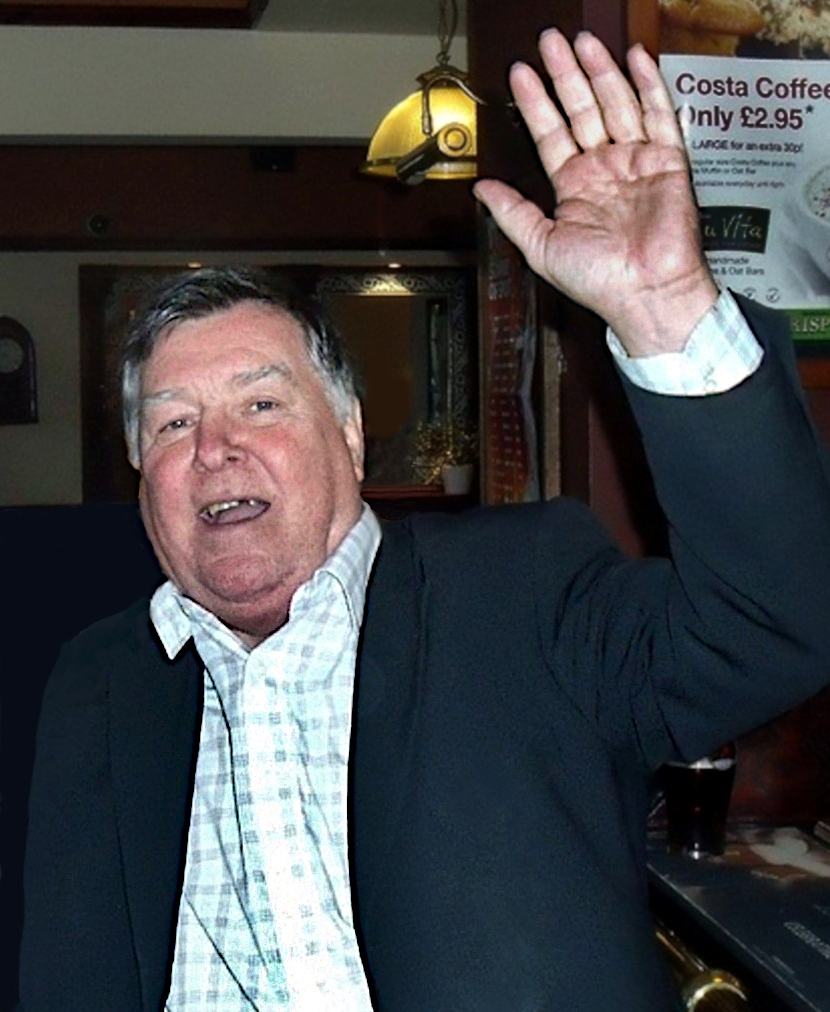
- John in 2011
- Born: 6 January 1945 Cefneithin, Wales
- Died: 4 February 2024 (aged 79) Cardiff, Wales
- Height: 5 ft 10 in (1.78 m)
- Weight: 11 st 11 lb (165 lb; 75 kg)
- School: Gwendraeth Grammar School
- University: Trinity College, Carmarthen
- Notable relatives: Derek Quinnell (brother-in-law); Scott, Craig and Gavin Quinnell (nephews)

Rugby union career
- Position: Fly-half
Amateur team(s)
Years	Team	Apps	(Points)
1962–1964	Cefneithin RFC		
1964–1967	Llanelli RFC	87	(210)
1967–1972	Cardiff RFC	93	(359)
1966–1970	Barbarian F.C.		
International career
Years	Team	Apps	(Points)
1966–1972	Wales	25	(90)
1968–1971	British Lions	5	(30)

Barry John (6 January 1945 – 4 February 2024) was a Welsh rugby union fly-half who played in the 1960s and early 1970s during the amateur era of the sport. John began his rugby career as a schoolboy playing for his local team Cefneithin RFC before switching to the first-class west Wales team Llanelli RFC in 1964. Whilst at Llanelli, John was selected for the Wales national team—as a replacement for David Watkins—to face a touring Australian team.

In 1967, John left Llanelli RFC for Cardiff RFC where he formed a partnership with Gareth Edwards: one of the most famous half-back pairings in world rugby. From 1967, John and Edwards made an inseparable partnership with rugby selectors, being chosen to play together at all levels of the sport, for Cardiff, Wales, the Barbarians and in 1968 for the British Lions' tour of South Africa. The tour ended prematurely for John when he suffered a broken collarbone in the first Test match against the South African national team.

In 1971, the Wales national team entered what is considered their second 'Golden Age', with a team rich in experience and talent. John was part of the team that won the 1971 Five Nations Championship, the first time Wales had achieved a Grand Slam win since 1952. He then cemented his reputation as one of the sport's greatest players with his pivotal role in the British and Irish Lions winning tour over New Zealand in 1971. On the 1971 tour, John played in all four Tests, playing some of his finest rugby and finishing as the Lions' top Test scorer.

John won 25 caps for the Wales national team and 5 for the British Lions. His excellent balance whilst running—along with precision kicking—made him one of the great players of the modern era. He retired from rugby at the age of 27, as Wales's highest points scorer, citing the pressure of fame and expectation for his decision.

== Rugby career ==
=== Early career with Llanelli ===
Barry John was born in Cefneithin, Carmarthenshire, in Wales on 6 January 1945. He attended Cefneithin Primary, and there he was fortunate to receive skilled rugby teaching. The headmaster, William John Jones, and teacher Ray Williams, were both former Wales international rugby players. Despite his natural talents, he never played at schoolboy level for Wales, but represented both his school and his local village team, Cefneithin RFC. He once played a game for rival team Pontyberem while still a schoolboy, but John recalls in his autobiography that the local resentment at making such a sporting faux pas ensured he never did so again.

John was then educated at Gwendraeth Grammar School in the Gwendraeth Valley, north of Llanelli and while still a teenager he made his first top-flight rugby appearance for Llanelli, on 4 January 1964, in an encounter with Moseley. Although Llanelli lost the encounter, John scored a try and converted it, and played in four more matches for the Llanelli senior team towards the end of the season. He continued to represent Llanelli while at Trinity College, Carmarthen, and gained a reputation as a kicking fly-half with a penchant for putting over dropped goals. During the 1964/65 season, John began to make an impact on the Welsh club scene. His dropped goal against Aberavon on 26 October 1964, only 17 games in, was his 11th of the season.

John gained more attention the following season. A win over Swansea, where he scored two dropped goals, was described by the Llanelli Star as being down to the "genius of one player, Barry John". He almost missed the second away encounter of the season with Swansea when he was 'held to ransom' by his fellow students at Trinity College. He was only released when Llanelli's club chairman, Elvet Jones, promised to make a donation to the college "rag". Llanelli won all four fixtures against Swansea that season, John scoring in all of them. As well as his two dropped goals in the first away fixture, he scored another in the second away game and a try in both the home matches at Stradey Park. In the 1965/66 season John was chosen to play in trial matches for the Wales national team. Although he was not picked, he was chosen as reserve to regular fly-half David Watkins.

During the 1966/67 season, John was again chosen to trial for Wales. One of the trials forced him to miss the second Swansea encounter of the season, played away on 12 November 1966; his place in the Llanelli team was given to a youth debutant from the Felinfoel club, Phil Bennett. Bennett became one of the greatest fly-halves produced by Wales, but he was kept from the Wales squad in his early career by the presence of John. In 1966, John was awarded his first international cap for Wales, taking Watkins' place at fly-half for the match against the touring Australia team. This was seen as a surprise move by the Welsh Rugby Union selectors, as Watkins had recently returned from a British Lions tour where he was team captain. Wales lost to Australia 11–4, the first time the Welsh had been beaten by the 'Wallabies', due to poor form in the midfield, with the criticism aimed at John, Gerald Davies and John Dawes. Although experiencing defeat in his first international, John managed to gain revenge over Australia just over a month later when the same team faced Llanelli at Stradey Park. Llanelli beat the Wallabies 11–0 after a bruising forward contest. John himself scored a try, and then added to his tally with a dropped goal.

Despite the Wales loss against Australia, the selectors kept faith with John, and he retained his place for the next Wales international. Played away from home, the opener of the 1967 Five Nations Championship against Scotland had him paired at half-back with Cardiff's Billy Hullin. John played badly while carrying a leg injury, and the next match he was dropped, replaced by the more experienced Watkins.

=== Joining Cardiff ===
In the 1967/68 season, John left Llanelli and joined Cardiff, where he formed a partnership with Gareth Edwards. Although John and Edwards later became the scourge of New Zealand, their first international pairing had an inauspicious start. On 11 November 1967, the pair played their first international together, facing Brian Lochore's touring New Zealand team. Edwards, like John, had two international games to his name, paired with Watkins in the final two matches of the 1967 Five Nations Championship. John regained his international place after Watkins had switched to professional rugby league just the month before, joining Salford for a club record fee of £16,000. Wales had an error-strewn game, in a match played in a cutting, rain-laden wind which turned the pitch into a muddy field. Wales captain Norman Gale won the toss and chose to play the first half into the gale, and finished the half 8–0 down. John raised Welsh hopes with an early dropped goal, his first international points, but a panicked blind back pass from Wales' number 8, John Jeffery, gifted Bill Davies an easy try. The game ended 13–6 to New Zealand, with Edwards looking uncomfortable throughout, and John's kicking inaccurate, there was little to suggest the pair would become one of the great half-back pairings in rugby history.

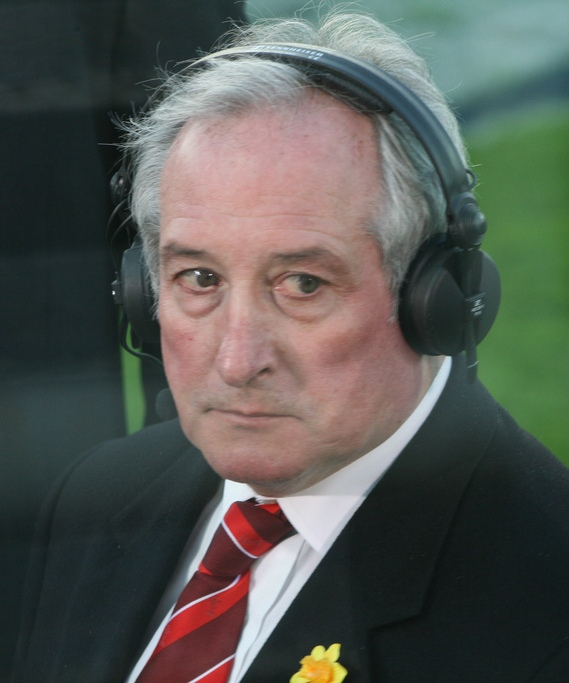
Gareth Edwards, John's partner at half-back for Cardiff, Wales, the Barbarians and the British Lions (taken in 2009)

Just over a month after playing for Wales against New Zealand, John faced the tourists again, this time as part of an East Wales team, made up of players from Cardiff, London Welsh and Bridgend. The New Zealand 'All Blacks' were under pressure throughout the match, with John kicking from deep and away from the opposing forwards, allowing his team to make rushes on the 'All Black' defence. After 22 minutes East Wales took the lead when a missed drop goal attempt from John was collected by Cardiff wing Frank Wilson for a try. A defensive lapse from the East Wales team allowed an equalising try, but with the score at 3–3, East Wales dominated the last ten minutes of the match. With the last kick of the match, John had space for one final dropped goal, but his kick sailed inches outside the post. The New Zealanders were glad to escape with the draw and finished the tour without losing a single match. Three days after turning out for East Wales, John and Edwards were paired to face the same New Zealand team, this time played at Twickenham for invitational touring side the Barbarians. The half-time result of 3–3 flattered the Barbarians, who were out-played in the forward positions, but the team took the lead early in the second half when a perfect diagonal kick to the corner by John resulted in a try by England's Bob Lloyd. The Barbarians defended strongly for twenty minutes, but lost to two very late tries.

Both John and Edwards were selected for all four matches of the 1968 Five Nations Championship. The first match, away at Twickenham to England, recorded Wales coming from 11–3 down to draw 11 all. Both half-backs were on the score sheet, Edwards with a try, John with one of his trademark dropped goals. After a home win over Scotland, Wales lost to both Ireland and, eventual Championship winners, France. At club level, John finished the season with a total of nine tries and nine dropped goals for Cardiff.

=== 1968 British Lions, the 1969 Triple Crown and Wales tour ===
John was selected for the British Lions in their tour of South Africa in 1968, but played in just four games before an injury forced him to return home. He played in three matches against district teams, Western Province, South Western Districts and Natal, all wins for the tourists. He was then selected for the First Test, played at Johannesburg, against the South Africa national team. John's first Test for the British Lions lasted for only fifteen minutes, when after running for the line he was tackled by Jan Ellis, and John broke his collarbone on landing on the hard ground.

John played infrequently for Cardiff during the 1968/69 season, making just 14 appearances. Despite this he was available for all matches in the 1969 Five Nations Championship, again playing in each match paired with Edwards. The Welsh selectors had dropped five players from the previous Championship, and notable debutants in the team to face Scotland at Murrayfield on 1 February 1969 were J. P. R. Williams and Mervyn Davies. John scored his first international try in the encounter after charging down a kick and dummying his way over. Scotland, who were under enormous pressure from the kick-off, lost 17–3.

When Ireland came to Cardiff Arms Park in March the team was on a seven-match unbeaten run, and were looking at taking the Grand Slam after defeating England, France and Scotland. It therefore came as a surprise at the ease with which the Welsh pack dominated. Wales won 24–11, with Dai Morris the stand-out Welsh player, though John also had one of his best matches, keeping pressure on the Irish with long touch kicks and scoring with a dropped goal.

Despite out-scoring France in tries scored, the match at Stade Colombes ended in an 8–8 draw, preventing a Welsh Grand Slam, though a win in the last match to England would give Wales the Championship. The England decider is best remembered for Maurice Richards' four tries, but John too was on the scoresheet with a dropped goal and a try of his own. The game finished 30–9 to Wales, giving John his first Championship title and making him a Triple Crown–winning player, as Wales had beaten all three other Home Nation teams.

Before the end of the season, John took part in his one and only seven-a-side tournament for Cardiff when he participated in the 1969 Snelling Sevens tournament. Cardiff progressed to the final, where they succeeded in beating John's former club Llanelli. As well as the title, John won the "Bill Everson – Player of the Tournament" award.

With the end of the 1968/69 season, the Welsh Rugby Union sent a team to tour New Zealand and Australia. At half-back, Wales sent John, Edwards, Phil Bennett and Chico Hopkins, but in all three Tests, two against the New Zealand "All Blacks" and one against Australia, Welsh coach Clive Rowlands kept faith with John and Edwards. The Welsh team were completely overwhelmed by the All Blacks, losing both Tests, 0–19 and 12–33. A change of tactics by Rowlands, by switching Gerald Davies to the right wing, gave Wales a victory over Australia, and a six-try victory over Fiji (in which John was replaced by Bennett), helped the team gain a warm reception on their return to Britain.

=== South Africa, the 1970 Championship and the 1971 Grand Slam ===
On 13 December 1969, Cardiff played host to the sixth touring South Africa team. The tour is remembered for the anti-apartheid protests that followed the team, and before the match 1,500 protesters had marched through the Welsh capital. John was unavailable for the encounter having fractured a rib while playing for the Barbarians against an Oxford University Past and Present team eleven days earlier. His place was taken by Beverley Davies and Cardiff lost 17–3. John recovered in time for the South Africa against Wales match on 24 January, and was selected alongside Edwards. The game was played in atrocious muddy conditions, and a last minute try from Edwards snatched a 6–6 draw. Both John and Edwards had a substandard game that day, but they combined well in the last move of the game to avoid defeat. A week later on 31 January, John and Edwards faced the South Africans again, this time as part of the Barbarians. The South Africans produced their best play of the tour to come from behind to win 21–12.

There was little rest for the two Cardiff half-backs when on 7 February 1970, they were called back into the Wales team for the first match of the 1970 Five Nations Championship, a home encounter at Cardiff Arms Park against Scotland. Despite Scotland being 9–0 ahead at one point, Wales took the initiative and scored four tries without reply, winning 18–9. The England game was John and Edwards' 15th Wales international together, in an away match which recorded the largest haul of tries for the Welsh team in England since 1908. John scored one of the tries along with a dropped goal. Due to an injury to Edwards, John finished the game alongside Chico Hopkins. With only Ireland standing in front of a Welsh Triple Crown win, hopes were high, but Ireland, made John and Edwards look ordinary in a 14–0 defeat. John was unavailable for the final game of the tournament to France, his place taken by Phil Bennett. Wales beat France and shared the Championship with the French.

The 1971 Five Nations Championship was a new dawn for Welsh rugby. The new National Stadium was completed, and the team now into their Second Golden era were both experienced and talented. John and Edwards played in all four games, starting with an easy win over England. Wales won 22–6, with John scoring six points from two dropped goals. The second game of the Championship, played against Scotland, was a close encounter, won by Wales 19–18 thanks to a late Gerald Davies try converted by John Taylor. Barry John scored eight of Wales' points, with a try, penalty goal and a conversion; missing only his trademark drop goal to complete a full house of scores. John surpassed his Scotland tally in the next match, a home game against Ireland, scoring 11 points with a dropped goal, conversion and two penalty goals. Seen as one of Wales' more accomplished victories, the 23–0 win gave the team a Triple Crown title, and set up a Grand Slam encounter with France. Despite the low score, the 9–5 win over France at Stade Colombes on 27 March was a match of the highest quality. Edwards and John scored all the points in the encounter, Edwards with a try, John a try and a penalty goal. This was Wales' first Grand Slam since 1952 and the 1971 squad is seen as the greatest ever to be fielded by Wales.

=== 1971 British Lions ===
In 1971, on their tour of New Zealand, John was again selected for the British Lions. With the painful memories of the woeful 1969 Wales Tour to New Zealand, John was determined to succeed with the Lions. Under the management of Doug Smith and the coaching of Carwyn James (also from Cefneithin), John rose to great individual heights with his match-winning performances. Of the 26 tour matches, he played in 17, only bettered by captain John Dawes and "Mighty Mouse" prop Ian McLauchlan. By the time of the first Test in Carisbrook, John had faced six teams, including the New South Wales Waratahs and the New Zealand Māori. All six games had been won by the Lions and John had recorded 88 points, including a full house against Waikato. In the First Test John terrorised New Zealand's fullback Fergie McCormick with ruthless tactical kicking. The All Blacks were shunted all over the field by John, who was well protected by his forwards, something that he was not afforded with Wales in 1969. The Lions won the Test 9–3, six of the Lions' points coming from two John penalties; McCormick never played for the All Blacks again.

Before the second Test John played in two more tour matches; wins over Southland and New Zealand Universities, in which he scored 32 points. In the game against the Universities John scored one of his most famous tries. John dummied a drop-goal before running through the Universities' defence, stepping inside the final tackler before touching the ball down under the posts, stunning the home crowd. The second Test, played at Christchurch, finished with the series drawn after New Zealand won 22–12, John scoring half of the Lions points. In between the second and third Tests, John played in three of the four regional matches, scoring 37 points including two tries in the game against Wairarapa.

A win in the third Test was vital to keep the Lions hope of a series win alive. John scored ten points of the 13–3 win, the other three coming from Wales' team-mate Gerald Davies. The final Test ended in a 14–14 draw, giving the series to the tourists. John scored eight of the Lions points, having scored in every match, Test and regional, he had played in.

It was on this tour that John received the nickname "The King" from the New Zealand press, though as early as 1965, he remembered being dubbed "King John" by a newspaper sub-editor while still at Llanelli. He scored 30 of the Lions 48 points over the four Tests, scored a record 191 points across the tour (6 tries, 31 conversions, 8 dropped goals and 27 penalties) and cemented his reputation as one of the game's greatest players.

=== 1972 Championship and retirement ===
John's final season with Wales ended disappointingly as both Scotland and Wales refused to travel to Ireland due to the increased violence in Northern Ireland and the events of Bloody Sunday. Despite this, John had a good Championship, scoring 35 points in the three games against England, Scotland and France. The opener, away to England, was won 12–3, with John scoring two penalty goals and converting a J. P. R. Williams try. This was followed by a win over Scotland, in which John played well, converting three of the five Welsh tries and scoring three penalty goals. John's final international was at home to France. He successfully converted four penalty goals in a 20–6 victory to Wales, and in scoring his final penalty surpassed the Wales international points-scoring record of Jack Bancroft set nearly 60 years earlier. The Welsh Rugby Union's refusal to allow travel to Ireland stole the team's possibility of a consecutive Grand Slam title.

In 1972, at the age of only 27, with 25 Wales caps and 5 British Lions caps, Barry John retired from the game. John cited the media attention and the unfair expectations of his country as reasons, believing he was "living in a goldfish bowl". John recalled one incident that moved him to retire was while doing a promotion at a bank; "Inside I said a few words and as I was being introduced to someone she curtsied. ... That convinced me this was not normal, I was becoming more and more detached from real people. I didn't want this any more."

His 25 caps for Wales resulted in 90 points scored, 5 tries, 9 conversions, 13 penalties and 8 dropped goals. His British Lions career added a further 30 international points, with a single try, 3 conversions, 5 penalties and 2 dropped goals. For Cardiff he played 5 seasons, playing 93 matches, during which he scored 24 tries and 30 dropped goals. His dropped goal total for Cardiff was the club's second highest total, drawn with Wilf Wooller but short of Percy Bush's tally of 35.

=== International games ===
Date	Representing	Opposition	Result	Tournament	Scrum-half	Tries	Conversions	Penalties	Drop goals
3 December 1966	Wales	Australia	11–14	1966 Australia tour	Allan Lewis	0	0	0	0
4 February 1967	Wales	Scotland	5–11	1967 Five Nations Championship	Billy Hullin	0	0	0	0
11 November 1967	Wales	New Zealand	6–13	1967 New Zealand tour	Gareth Edwards	0	0	0	1
20 January 1968	Wales	England	11–11	1968 Five Nations Championship	Gareth Edwards	0	0	0	1
3 February 1968	Wales	Scotland	5–0	1968 Five Nations Championship	Gareth Edwards	0	0	0	0
9 March 1968	Wales	Ireland	6–9	1968 Five Nations Championship	Gareth Edwards	0	0	0	0
23 March 1968	Wales	France	9–14	1968 Five Nations Championship	Gareth Edwards	0	0	0	0
8 June 1968	British Lions	South Africa	20–25	1968 British Lions tour	Gareth Edwards	0	0	0	0
1 February 1969	Wales	Scotland	17–3	1969 Five Nations Championship	Gareth Edwards	1	0	0	0
8 March 1969	Wales	Ireland	24–11	1969 Five Nations Championship	Gareth Edwards	0	0	0	1
22 March 1969	Wales	France	8–8	1969 Five Nations Championship	Gareth Edwards	0	0	0	0
12 April 1969	Wales	England	30–9	1969 Five Nations Championship	Gareth Edwards	1	0	0	1
31 May 1969	Wales	New Zealand	0–19	1969 Wales rugby union tour	Gareth Edwards	0	0	0	0
14 June 1969	Wales	New Zealand	12–33	1969 Wales rugby union tour	Gareth Edwards	0	0	0	0
21 June 1969	Wales	Australia	19–16	1969 Wales rugby union tour	Gareth Edwards	0	0	0	0
24 January 1970	Wales	South Africa	6–6	1969–70 South Africa rugby union tour	Gareth Edwards	0	0	0	0
7 February 1970	Wales	Scotland	18–9	1970 Five Nations Championship	Gareth Edwards	0	0	0	0
28 February 1970	Wales	England	17–13	1970 Five Nations Championship	Gareth Edwards	1	0	0	1
14 March 1970	Wales	Ireland	0–14	1970 Five Nations Championship	Gareth Edwards	0	0	0	0
16 January 1971	Wales	England	22–6	1971 Five Nations Championship	Gareth Edwards	0	0	0	2
6 February 1971	Wales	Scotland	19–18	1971 Five Nations Championship	Gareth Edwards	1	1	1	0
13 March 1971	Wales	Ireland	23–9	1971 Five Nations Championship	Gareth Edwards	0	1	2	1
27 March 1971	Wales	France	9–5	1971 Five Nations Championship	Gareth Edwards	1	0	1	0
26 June 1971	British Lions	New Zealand	9-3	1971 British Lions tour	Gareth Edwards	0	0	2	0
10 July 1971	British Lions	New Zealand	12–22	1971 British Lions tour	Gareth Edwards	0	0	1	1
31 July 1971	British Lions	New Zealand	13–3	1971 British Lions tour	Gareth Edwards	1	2	0	1
14 August 1971	British Lions	New Zealand	14–14	1971 British Lions tour	Gareth Edwards	0	1	2	0
15 January 1972	Wales	England	12–3	1972 Five Nations Championship	Gareth Edwards	0	1	2	0
5 February 1972	Wales	Scotland	35–12	1972 Five Nations Championship	Gareth Edwards	0	3	3	0
25 March 1972	Wales	France	20–6	1972 Five Nations Championship	Gareth Edwards	0	0	4	0

== Critical reception ==
As the authors of the official history of the Welsh Rugby Union, David Smith and Gareth Williams wrote of John:

The clue to an understanding of his achieved style lies in what he could make others do to themselves. The kicking, whether spinning trajectories that rolled away or precise chips or scudding grubbers, was a long-range control, but his running, deft, poised, a fragile illusion that one wrong instant could crack, yet rarely did, was the art of the fly-half at its most testing. He was the dragonfly on the anvil of destruction. John ran in another dimension of time and space. His opponents ran into the glass walls which covered his escape routes from their bewildered clutches. He left mouths, and back rows, agape.

Gareth Edwards, in his 1978 autobiography, when describing John, wrote:

He had this marvellous easiness in the mind, reducing problems to their simplest form, backing his own talent all the time. One success on the field bred another and soon he gave off a cool superiority which spread to others in the side. Physically he was perfectly made for the job, good and strong from the hips down and firm but slender from the waist to the shoulders.

J. P. R. Williams regarded John as "Without doubt, the greatest player I played with."

Gerald Davies, who played with John for Wales and the British Lions, in his 1971 autobiography described Edwards as "fiery and impulsive", but John was "fairer, aloof and apart. Whilst the hustle and bustle went on around him he could divorce himself from it all; he kept his emotions in check and a careful rein on the surrounding action. The game would go according to his will and no-one else's ..."

Rodney Webb, who represented England between 1967 and 1972, is quoted as saying "Barry John's punting was phenomenal. He could drop the ball on a sixpence and he could do it every time". Webb, who developed the modern rugby ball, believes that John cannot be compared to modern kickers because "the modern ball is coated in a laminate, has dimpled surfaces, unobtrusive lacing and multi panels. In the seventies the balls soaked up water, swerved all over the place and were placed in the mud and slime when kicking for goal".

John came third in the 1971 BBC Sports Personality of the Year Award, beaten by winner Princess Anne and runner-up George Best. He was one of the inaugural inductees of the International Rugby Hall of Fame in 1997 and in 1999 was inducted into the Welsh Sports Hall of Fame. In 2015 he was inducted into the World Rugby Hall of Fame.

=== Amateurism ===
As an amateur rugby union player, John was not paid to play rugby at club or international level. To receive money for playing would have been recognised as an act of professionalism and would have resulted in action from one of the governing unions, normally suspension or a ban. To prevent players switching to professional rugby league, players were given boot money by their clubs or sponsors, named after the early practice of placing money in the players' boots. In his 2011 book Appy, businessman and football manager Meirion Appleton said that in the 1970s he made illegal payments to both John and Gareth Edwards. Appleton said that before an international match he gave both players envelopes containing money from sportswear manufacturer Adidas. John was never charged with taking illegal payments during his career.

== Personal life ==
John was born at Low-land, a smallholding at Cefneithin in Carmarthenshire, Wales. He was the second child of William and Vimy John; his brother Delville was three years his senior. John had a further four siblings, Alan, Clive, Madora and Diane. All three of his brothers played rugby. Delville played for Cefneithin, captaining them for two seasons; Alan progressed from the local club to Llanelli and also toured Argentina with Wales; while Clive was a Llanelli wing forward who was selected for Wales 'B'. The family went to live at Foelgastell, staying with an uncle and aunt, shortly after John's birth but returned to Cefneithin when John was two. His early schooling was at Cefneithin Primary, and after failing his eleven-plus exam he spent a year at Cross Hands senior centre. He passed the entrance exam and was accepted into Gwendraeth Grammar School at Drefach.

At the age of 18, he left grammar school and was awarded a place at Trinity College, Carmarthen, with ambitions of becoming a teacher. He studied physical education, junior science and horticulture. He left Trinity in the summer of 1967, and took up a post as a physical education teacher at Monkton House School in Cardiff, a private school for boys between the ages of eight and sixteen. John moved to Cardiff and shared a house with several other rugby players, including former Llanelli team mate Gerald Davies. John quit his position at Monkton House when he toured South Africa in 1968 and never taught again. On his return from Africa, John moved back to his family home at Cefneithin. He spent six weeks unemployed and during this period he considered turning to professional rugby league, almost signing for St Helens.

Following an interview with David Coleman for the BBC programme, Sportsnight, in which his jobless situation was discussed, John was offered a job working for Forward Trust, a finance company in Cardiff. When John quit playing rugby in 1972, he also left his job as a finance representative, signing a contract to write a weekly column and cover important matches for the Daily Express. He was also signed to take part in sport programmes presented by HTV, the Wales and West of England commercial television company.

In September 1969, John married Janet Talfan Davies, daughter of Alun Talfan Davies QC, a leading Welsh lawyer. John and Jan had four children; they later separated.

In 2001, John ran a Chinese restaurant near Cardiff's Millennium Stadium.

In 2009, he decided to sell his rugby memorabilia, including his Wales caps, stating that he felt no nostalgia towards the items, and the honour of playing for Wales was all that mattered.

John died in Cardiff on 4 February 2024, at the age of 79. A family statement read: "Barry John died peacefully today at the University Hospital of Wales surrounded by his loving wife and four children. He was a loving Dadcu [grandfather] to 11 grandchildren and a much-loved brother."

== Bibliography ==
- Bevan, Alun Wyn (2005). Stradey Stories. Llandysul: Gomer Press. ISBN 978-1-84323-570-5.
- Billot, John (1972). All Blacks in Wales. Ferndale: Ron Jones Publications.
- Billot, John (1974). Springboks in Wales. Ferndale: Ron Jones Publications.
- Davies, D. E. (1975). Cardiff Rugby Club, History and Statistics 1876–1975. Risca: The Starling Press. ISBN 0-9504421-0-0.
- Godwin, Terry (1984). The International Rugby Championship 1883–1983. London: Willow Books. ISBN 0-00-218060-X.
- Griffiths, John (1990). British Lions. Swindon: Crowood Press. ISBN 1-85223-541-1.
- Griffiths, John (1987). The Phoenix Book of International Rugby Records. London: Phoenix House. ISBN 0-460-07003-7.
- Hughes, Gareth (1986). The Scarlets: A History of Llanelli Rugby Club. Llanelli: Llanelli Borough Council. ISBN 0-906821-05-3.
- Jenkins, John M.; et al. (1991). Who's Who of Welsh International Rugby Players. Wrexham: Bridge Books. ISBN 1-872424-10-4.
- John, Barry (1974). The Barry John Story. London: Collins. ISBN 0-00-216011-0.
- Owen, Arwyn, ed. (1972). Welsh Brewers Rugby Annual for Wales 1971–72. Cardiff: Welsh Brewers.
- Parker, A. C. (1970). The Springboks, 1891–1970. London: Cassell & Company. ISBN 0-304-93591-3.
- Richards, Alun (1980). A Touch of Glory: 100 Years of Welsh Rugby. London: Michael Joseph. ISBN 0-7181-1938-X.
- Smith, David; Williams, Gareth (1980). Fields of Praise: The Official History of The Welsh Rugby Union. Cardiff: University of Wales Press. ISBN 0-7083-0766-3.
- Starmer-Smith, Nigel (1977). The Barbarians. Macdonald & Jane's Publishers. ISBN 0-86007-552-4.
- Thomas, Clem; Nicholson, Geoffrey (1980). Welsh Rugby, The Crowning Years 1968–1980. London: Collins. ISBN 0-00-211641-3.
- Thomas, J. B. G. (1980). The Illustrated History of Welsh Rugby. London: Pelham Books. ISBN 0-7207-1268-8.
- Thomas, J. B. G. (1970). Rugby in Wales. Swansea: Christopher Davies (publishers).
- Thomas, Wayne (1979). A Century of Welsh Rugby Players. Ansells.
