= Barry Bresnihan =

Irish rheumatologist and rugby union footballer

- Born: Finbarr Patrick Kieran Bresnihan; 13 March 1944 Waterford, Ireland
- Died: 18 July 2010 (aged 66)
- School: Gonzaga College, Dublin
- University: University College Dublin
- Occupation: rheumatologist

Rugby union career
- Position: Centre
Amateur team(s)
Years	Team	Apps	(Points)
- University College Dublin RFC
–	Lansdowne		
–	London Irish		
–	Dallas Harlequins		
Provincial / State sides
Years	Team	Apps	(Points)
- Munster
International career
Years	Team	Apps	(Points)
1966-71	Ireland	25	(24)
1966-68	British and Irish Lions	3	
–	Barbarians		

Finbarr Patrick Kieran Bresnihan (13 March 1944 – 18 July 2010) was an Irish rheumatologist and international rugby union player.

Bresnihan was born in Waterford in 1944 and educated at Gonzaga College, Dublin before qualifying as a doctor at University College Dublin (UCD). He was married with a son and three daughters and died in 2010.

== Medical career ==
After qualifying as a doctor, Bresnihan specialised in rheumatology at Guy's Hospital in London before working with Morris Ziff at the University of Texas Southwestern Medical School before returning to Ireland to set up a laboratory at the UCD Medical School and St. Vincent's University Hospital. During his career he wrote a number of papers, two books and contributions to works on rheumatology. In 1991 UCD created a chair of Rheumatology for Bresnihan and in 2009 he was honoured as a "Master" by the American College of Rheumatology.

== Rugby career ==
Bresnihan was capped twenty-five times as a centre for Ireland between 1966 and 1971. He scored six tries for Ireland.

Bresnihan made two British and Irish Lions tours. He was called up as a replacement for the 1966 British Lions tour to Australia and New Zealand but did not play in any of the tests. He was also selected for the 1968 British Lions tour to South Africa and played in three of the tests against South Africa.

He played club rugby for University College Dublin, Lansdowne, London Irish, and Dallas Harlequins, and represented the Munster provincial team and the Barbarians invitiational team.
