= Bob Hiller =

English cricketer and rugby union footballer

- Born: Robert Hiller; 14 October 1942 (age 84) Woking
- Height: 1.88 m (6 ft 2 in)
- Weight: 86 kg (13 st 8 lb; 190 lb)
- School: Bec Grammar School
- Occupation: Teacher

Rugby union career
- Position: Fullback
Amateur team(s)
Years	Team	Apps	(Points)
- Harlequins
Provincial / State sides
Years	Team	Apps	(Points)
- Surrey
International career
Years	Team	Apps	(Points)
1968–1972	England	19	(138)
1968, 1971	British Lions	19	(219)
1971	Barbarian FC	1	(9)

Robert Hiller (born 14 October 1942) is a former England international rugby union player. He was educated at Bec Grammar School before taking a place at St Edmund Hall, Oxford where he played both rugby and cricket to a high standard. He appeared in eight first-class cricket matches for the Oxford University Cricket Club taking 17 wickets, at an average of 29.05. He won a blue in both cricket and rugby.

Even before going to university his talent had been spotted by David 'Wrecker' Brooks, later Bob’s predecessor as President of Harlequins, Bob was persuaded to join the club where he was soon a first team regular playing for the 1XV from 1963-1976, captaining the club from 1968-70, and was still playing for the Harlequin Gentlemen in 1980.

Hiller's talent was soon after recognised by England and he made his England debut against Wales at Twickenham on 20 January 1968 and remained the regular first choice at fullback 1968-72 before winning the last of his 19 caps against Ireland at Twickenham on 12 February 1972. He captained England in seven internationals and scored 138 points (including a point in every game he played in), an England record at the time of his retirement which has subsequently been beaten.

Hiller fell out with the rugby authorities on numerous occasions. He was dropped three times: in 1970 against France, even though he had been appointed captain at the start of the season, and England were thrashed, and he was immediately reinstated; in 1971 when he was left out against Wales; and in 1972 when he had already decided to retire at the end of the season.

He went on two tours with the British and Irish Lions - to South Africa in 1968 and to New Zealand in 1971 and although he played in no Test matches for the Lions he amassed 214 points in non-international fixtures across the two tours. Hiller remains the second highest points scorer for the Lions behind only Phil Bennett with 236.

He later taught at Bec Grammar School in Tooting where he had been a pupil before in 1976 moving to King's College School, Wimbledon where he taught mathematics until his retirement in 2002.

Sporting positions
Preceded by Budge Rogers	English National Rugby Union Captain; 1969-70	Succeeded by Bob Taylor
Preceded by John Spencer	English National Rugby Union Captain; 1971	Succeeded by John Spencer
Preceded by John Spencer	English National Rugby Union Captain; 1972	Succeeded by Peter Dixon
