= Jock Turner =

Scotland international rugby union player

- Born: John William Cleet Turner; 28 September 1943 Scottish Borders, Scotland
- Died: 19 May 1992 (aged 48)

Rugby union career
- Position(s): fly-half, centre, fullback
Senior career
Years	Team	Apps	(Points)
- Gala RFC
International career
Years	Team	Apps	(Points)
1966–1971	Scotland	20	
- Correct as of 26 August 2009

John "Jock" William Cleet Turner (28 September 1943 – 19 May 1992) was a Scotland international rugby union player. His regular playing positions were fly-half, centre and fullback.

Turner was capped twenty times for Scotland between 1966 and 1971, winnings six caps at fly-half, thirteen as a centre and one at fullback. He scored two tries for Scotland.

Richard Bath writes of him that:

"Although he was at his height a decade before John Rutherford appeared on the scene, Gala's Jock Turner shared many similarities with the Selkirk legend, not least the Borders school of hard knocks in which they plied their trade on a domestic level. A regular with the great Gala sevens of the 1960s, Turner had a huge boot on him, but was equally at home running at opposition defences, as he did to such effect in Scotland's 14–3 loss to the touring All Blacks in 1967."

Turner was selected for the 1968 British Lions tour to South Africa and played in all four internationals against South Africa.

In 1971, he helped Scotland win their first victory at Twickenham for 33 years.

Turner played club rugby for Gala.

Allan Massie writes of him that:

"His best season for Scotland may have been his last when he played fly-half partnered by bis clubmate Duncan Paterson, but his best position was probably centre...

"Turner was always inclined to be underrated, and he was neither spectacular nor readily recognizable as his contemporaries Rea or Frame. But he was sounder than either, an utterly reliable handler and a magnificent tackler, and a much better kicker. His virtues were indeed only beginning to be recognized when he retired... one touchline try against England at Twickenham was scored in the narrowest imaginable space. He scored another try against England the next year with a clean breakthrough after a scissors with Ian Robertson."

Turner died suddenly after a day of fishing with the legendary Welsh rugby player Gareth Edwards.
