= Mike Gibson (rugby union) =

Irish rugby union player (born 1942)

- Born: Cameron Michael Henderson Gibson; 3 December 1942 (age 83) Belfast, Northern Ireland
- School: Campbell College
- University: University of Cambridge

Rugby union career
- Position: Centre
International career
Years	Team	Apps	(Points)
1964–1979	Ireland	69	(112)
1966–1971	Lions	12	(0)
1963–1976	Barbarians	9	(6)
- Correct as of 24 June 2012

Cameron Michael Henderson Gibson MBE (born 3 December 1942) is an Irish former rugby union international player who represented Ireland and the British & Irish Lions.

On Gibson's induction into the IRB Hall of Fame in May 2011, former teammate and fellow Hall of Fame inductee Syd Millar said of him: "... [he] was one of the finest players of his generation, one of the finest players ever to represent Ireland and the British & Irish Lions and a man who epitomised the very ethos of the Game and its values". Fellow IRFU inductee Willie John McBride considers Gibson the greatest Irish player he ever watched.

== Early life ==
Gibson came from a sporting family, and followed football initially. He was educated at Campbell College in Belfast, then read law at Queens' College, Cambridge. His brother had also read law at Cambridge.

== Rugby playing career ==
=== Club career ===
Gibson played the bulk of his career for North of Ireland F.C. ("North"). While studying, Gibson played for Cambridge University. In February 1966 he played for London Irish against St Mary's Hospital. He continued playing club rugby until 42.

=== International career ===
==== Ireland ====
Gibson's career began with Ireland in 1964 and he earned his 69th and final cap in the second and final test win against Australia in Sydney in 1979 at age 36. A versatile player, he represented his country in four different positions. Prior to moving to centre, Gibson played fly half to a high level. He was known for the perception and timing of his attacking play, the focus and anticipation of his defence and the dedication and commitment with which he applied himself across a 15-year international career in which he appeared in a then-world record 81 Tests, including five tours with the British & Irish Lions.

Gibson scored 112 Test points (9 tries, 16 penalties, 7 conversions and 6 drop goals) for Ireland. Gibson's record Ireland caps haul of 69 was overtaken by lock Malcolm O'Kelly against Scotland in February 2005. The mark had lasted for 26 years. His record of 56 appearances in the Five Nations (now Six Nations) was not equalled until countryman Ronan O'Gara reached the mark in Ireland's final match of the 2011 Six Nations.

==== British and Irish Lions ====
On the 1968 tour to South Africa, Gibson made history in the opening Test by becoming the first replacement in international rugby. He played in 11 of the final 13 matches after Welsh fly-half Barry John had been invalided out of the tour.

In the 1971 tour to New Zealand, Gibson formed a midfield combination alongside captain John Dawes. The 1971 tour is the Lions' sole series victory over the All Blacks. In 2018 Gibson won 'substantial' damages over false allegations made by John Spencer that he manipulated British and Irish Lions team selection to ensure his place in the Test team.

Gibson's work commitments saw him join the 1974 Lions in South Africa as a replacement during the second half of the tour. Gibson played understudy to the new Test pairing of Ian McGeechan and Richard Milliken.

Gibson was selected for his fifth Lions tour in 1977, equalling fellow Irishman Willie John McBride's record. However, back and hamstring problems meant that Gibson was unable to compete for a test place.

==== Other representative teams ====
Gibson played for a combined Scotland/Ireland XV in the 1970 Centenary of RFU celebration match against a combined England/Wales XV and again in the 1972 Scottish Rugby Union Centenary match.

=== Rugby playing honours ===
Gibson was awarded an MBE for services to the game.

When the International Rugby Hall of Fame was instituted in 1997, Gibson was one of the initial fifteen inductees. Upon his induction into the IRB Hall of Fame in 2011, Gibson paid tribute to his teammates, calling rugby the greatest team sport.

In January 2012 Gibson was inducted into the Belfast Telegraph Hall of Fame.

In an interview in 2011, Irish rugby great Brian O'Driscoll praised Gibson's contribution to Irish rugby:

At times when Irish rugby wasn't successful Mike was always the shining light. He played international rugby for 15 years and that speaks volumes about him. He was a magnificent player and a true ambassador for the game.

=== After retirement ===
Gibson continued to play an active role in the rugby community after he retired from playing.

Gibson has acted as a marshal for the Open Golf Championship in 2025.

== Professional career ==
Gibson practised as a solicitor in Belfast. Fellow Irish international David Humphreys trained as a solicitor in Gibson's firm.

== Personal life ==
Gibson married Moyra in 1970. They had met when he was 18 and she was 16. Their son played rugby with Gloucester, and their daughter played hockey for Ireland. Gibson also played golf. They lived in Belfast.

Gibson has credited people with having important influences on his life, including his family and Ronnie Dawson.

He has said that he is not sure if he would have played professional rugby.
