= Roger Young (rugby union) =

British Lions & Ireland international rugby union player

- Born: 29 June 1943 (age 83) Belfast, Northern Ireland

Rugby union career
International career
| Years | Team | Apps | (Points) |
| 1965-1971 | Ireland | 26 | (5) |
| 1966-1968 | Lions | 4 | |

Roger Michael Young (born 29 June 1943) is a former Ireland and British Lions International rugby union player.

He was capped twenty-six times as a scrum-half for Ireland between 1965 and 1971 and scored one try for Ireland against Scotland in 1965.

Young was selected for the 1966 British Lions tour to Australia and New Zealand and played two internationals against Australia and one against New Zealand. He also went on the 1968 British Lions tour to South Africa and played in one international against South Africa.

Educated at Methodist College Belfast, he played club rugby for Queen's University R.F.C. and Collegians.
