= Tom Kiernan =

Irish rugby union player (1939–2022)

- Born: Thomas Joseph Kiernan; 7 January 1939 Cork, County Cork, Munster, Ireland
- Died: 3 February 2022 (aged 83)
- Notable relative: Mike Kiernan (nephew)

Rugby union career
- Position: Fullback
Senior career
| Years | Team | Apps | (Points) |
| 1950s–1960 | Cork Constitution | | |
| 1958–1973 | Munster | | |
| 1960–1963 | UC Cork | | |
| 1963–1970s | Cork Constitution | | |
International career
| Years | Team | Apps | (Points) |
| 1962–1968 | Lions | 5 | (35) |
| 1960–1973 | Ireland | 59 | (158) |
Coaching career
- Years: Team
- 1978: Munster

Thomas Joseph Kiernan (7 January 1939 – 3 February 2022) was an Ireland international rugby union player. He won 54 caps for Ireland as a full-back between 1960 and 1973 and captained his country 24 times. At the time of his retirement he was Ireland's most-capped player, most experienced captain, and record scorer in internationals with 158 points. He captained the 1968 British Lions tour to South Africa, playing in all four internationals against South Africa. His nephew, Mike Kiernan, also played for Ireland and the Lions. Kiernan was also the Munster team coach for their famous victory over the All Blacks in 1978. He received the IRB Distinguished Service Award in 2001. He died on 3 February 2022, at the age of 83.

| Preceded by Noel Murphy | Irish national rugby coach 1980–1983 | Succeeded by Willie John McBride |
