= 1966 Five Nations Championship squads =

Rugby union competition squads

These are the 1966 Five Nations Championship squads:

== England ==
1. Terry Arthur
2. Clive Ashby
3. Tom Brophy
4. Mike Davis
5. Dick Greenwood
6. Andy Hancock
7. Danny Hearn
8. Tony Horton
9. Phil Judd
10. Colin McFadyean
11. John Owen
12. Colin Payne
13. David Perry
14. Piggy Powell
15. John Pullin
16. Budge Rogers (c.)
17. David Rosser
18. Ted Rudd
19. Don Rutherford
20. Keith Savage
21. George Sherriff
22. Jeremy Spencer
23. Bob Taylor
24. Bill Treadwell
25. Mike Weston
26. Trevor Wintle

== France ==
1. Jean-Claude Berejnoi
2. André Boniface
3. Guy Boniface
4. Jean-Michel Cabanier
5. Lilian Camberabero
6. Élie Cester
7. Michel Crauste (c.)
8. Christian Darrouy
9. Benoît Dauga
10. Bernard Duprat
11. Jean Gachassin
12. Arnaldo Gruarin
13. André Herrero
14. Claude Lacaze
15. Marcel Puget
16. Jean-Claude Roques
17. Jean-Joseph Rupert
18. Walter Spanghero

== Ireland ==
1. Aidan Brady
2. Barry Bresnihan
3. Mick Doyle
4. Alan Duggan
5. Kevin Flynn
6. Mike Gibson
7. Ray Hunter
8. Ken Kennedy
9. Tom Kiernan
10. Ronnie Lamont
11. Sean MacHale
12. Willie John McBride
13. Paddy McGrath
14. Ray McLoughlin (c.)
15. Mick Molloy
16. Noel Murphy
17. Ollie Waldron
18. Jerry Walsh
19. Roger Young

== Scotland ==
1. Colin Blaikie
2. Mike Campbell-Lamerton
3. David Chisholm
4. Pringle Fisher
5. Derrick Grant
6. Alex Hastie
7. Brian Henderson
8. Sandy Hinshelwood
9. Frank Laidlaw
10. Iain Laughland
11. John MacDonald
12. David Rollo
13. Peter Stagg
14. Jim Telfer
15. Jock Turner
16. David Whyte
17. Stewart Wilson (c.)

== Wales ==
1. Dewi Bebb
2. Keith Bradshaw
3. Lyn Davies
4. Norman Gale
5. Grahame Hodgson
6. Ken Jones
7. Allan Lewis
8. John Lloyd
9. Haydn Morgan
10. Bill Morris
11. Howard Norris
12. Alun Pask (c.)
13. Brian Price
14. Terry Price
15. Gareth Prothero
16. Brian Thomas
17. David Watkins
18. Stuart Watkins
19. Denzil Williams
