= 1965–66 FIRA Nations Cup =

European rugby union championship

1965–66 Nations Cup
- Date: 17 October 1965 – 6 November 1966
- Countries: France; Romania; Italy; West Germany; Czechoslovakia

Tournament statistics
- Champions: France
- Matches played: 6

The Nations Cup 1965–66 was the sixth edition of a European rugby union championship for national teams and was the first with this name. After the 1954 European Cup, the FIRA did not organize any championship. During the 1964 general assembly in The Hague, it was decided to organize a tournament as a league championship. The teams would be divided in two divisions, with a process of promotion and relegation. The first edition was played between 1965 and 1966. Italy, France, and Romania already played against each other regularly in test matches, so it was easy to arrange this kind of tournament.

== First division ==
=== Table ===
| Place | Nation | Games | | | | Points | | | Table points |
| Place | Nation | played | won | drawn | lost | for | against | difference | Table points |
|---|---|---|---|---|---|---|---|---|---|
| 1 | France | 4 | 4 | 0 | 0 | 73 | 21 | 52 | 8 |
| 2 | Italy | 4 | 2 | 1 | 1 | 17 | 24 | −7 | 5 |
| 3 | Romania | 4 | 1 | 1 | 2 | 21 | 28 | −7 | 3 |
| 4 | West Germany | 4 | 1 | 1 | 2 | 42 | 26 | 16 | 3 |
| 5 | Czechoslovakia | 4 | 0 | 1 | 3 | 27 | 81 | −54 | 1 |

=== Results ===
Point system–Try:3 pt, Conversion:2 pt, Penalty kick:3 pt, drop:3 pt, Goal from mark:3 pt
Click "show" for more info about match (scorers, line-up etc).

17 October 1965

| West Germany | 25–6 | Czechoslovakia |

Michelstadt

14 November 1965

| West Germany | 8–9 | Romania |

Hanover

| 28 November 1965 | France | 8–3 | Romania | Stade de Gerland, Lyon |
| | Try: G. Boniface; Con: A. Boniface | | Drop: Dragomirescu-Rahtopol | Referee: R. Gilliland (Republic of Ireland) |
| France: 15.Claude Lacaze, 14.Pierre Besson, 13.Guy Boniface, 12.Andre Boniface, 11.Christian Darrouy, 10.Jean Gachassin, 9.Jean-Claude Lasserre, 8.Maurice Lira, 7.Michel Crauste (cap), 6.Michel Sitjar, 5.Walter Spanghero, 4.Benoit Dauga, 3.Andre Abadie, 2.Jean-Michel Cabanier, 1.Jean-Claude Berejnoi | | | | Referee: R. Gilliland (Republic of Ireland) |
Romania: 15.Alexandru Penciu, 14.M. Tibuleac, 13.M. Wusek, 12.Valeriu Irimescu, 11.Paul Ciobanel, 10.Gheorghie Dragomirescu-Rahtopol, 9.Adrian Mateescu, 8.Radu Demian (c), 7.Gheorghie Baltaretu, 6.Mircea Iliescu, 5.Mircea Rusu, 4.Ion Tutuianu, 3.Teodor Radulescu, 2.Paul Iordachescu, 1.Constantin Dinu

| 8 December 1965 | Italy | 11–0 | Czechoslovakia | Livorno |
| | Try: Armellin, Ambron 2 Con: Speziali | | | Referee: A. Cuny (France) |
| Italy:=15.E. Giugovaz, 14.G. Troncon, 13.R. Sciacol, 12.R.Luise, 11.V. Ambron, 10.F. II, 9.U.Conforto, 8.A.di Zitti (cap), 7.G.Colussi, 6.D. Armellin, 5.E.Speziali, 4.I.Mazzucchelli, 3.G.Romagnoli, 2.L.Avigo, 1.F. Mazzantini | | | | Referee: A. Cuny (France) |
Czechoslovakia: 15.Kovrc, 14. Nacer, 13. Eliasek, 12.Hora, 11.Fiala, 10.Kourek, 9.Sendler, 8. Vilek, 7.Fridrik, 6.Krutzner, 5. Tropol, 4. Barchanek, 3.Smrst, 2. Liska, 1.Kradek

| 9 April 1966 | Italy | 0–21 | France | Naples |
| | | | Try: Darrouy, Dauga; Lagrange, Maso; Con: Lacaze 3 Drop: Lacaze | Attendance: Arenaccia, Naples; Referee: Brooke (England) |
| Italy:: 15.Ettore Giugovaz, 14.Giorgio Troncon, 13.Andrea d'Alberton, 12.Roberto Luise, 11.Vittorio Ambron, 10.Francesco Soro, 9.Elio Fusco, 8.Antonio di Zitti (cap), 7.Giancarlo Degli Antoni, 6.Marco Bollesan, 5.Franco Piccinini, 4.Ivo Mazzucchelli, 3.Enzo Bellinazzo, 2.Oreste Vene', 1.Franco Mazzantini | | | | Attendance: Arenaccia, Naples; Referee: Brooke (England) |
France :15.Claude Lacaze, 14.Bernard Duprat, 13.Jo Maso, 12.Jean-Claude Lagrange, 11.Christian Darrouy, 10.Jean-Claude Roques, 9.Marcel Puget, 8.Andre Herrero, 7.Michel Crauste (cap), 6.Jean-Joseph Rupert, 5.Walter Spanghero, 4.Benoit Dauga, 3.Arnaldo Gruarin, 2.Jean-Michel Cabanier, 1.Jean-Claude Berejnoi

10 April 1966

| France B | 8–6 | West Germany |

Chalon sur Saone

8 May 1966

| Czechoslovakia | 12–36 | France B |

Kobylisy, Prague

29 May 1966

| Czechoslovakia | 9–9 | Romania |

Prague

| 30 October 1966 | West Germany | 3–3 | Italy | Berlin |
| | Pen: Dannenberg | | Pen: Di Zitti | Referee: Lacroix (Belgium) |
| West Germany: 15. Dannemberg; 14.Haas; 13. Frauenfeld; 12.Bruhl; 11. Friedel; 10. Wesh; 9. Selingmann;8. Dreyer; 7.Morgenroth; 6. Heupel; 5. Kneifel; 4. Hoppe; 3.Schnidt; 2. Glocke; 1.Nolte. | | | | Referee: Lacroix (Belgium) |
Italy:=15.Angelo Autore, 14.Luciano Modonesi, 13.Gastone Giani, 12.Andrea d'Alberton, 11.Vittorio Ambron, 10.Francesco Soro II, 9.Umberto Conforto, 8.Franco Zani, 7.Giancarlo Degli Antoni, 6.Marco Bollesan, 5.Antonio di Zitti (c), 4.Ivo Mazzucchelli, 3.Enzo Bellinazzo, 2.Lucio Avigo, 1.Dominico Armellin

| 6 November 1966 | Italy | 3–0 | Romania | L'Aquila |
| | Pen: Ambron | | | Referee: Cuny (France) |
| Italy: 15.Luciano Modonesi, 14.Giorgio Troncon, 13.Gastone Giani, 12.Andrea d'Alberton, 11.Vittorio Ambron, 10.Francesco Soro II, 9.Umberto Conforto, 8.Franco Zani, 7.Giancarlo Degli Antoni, 6.Loreto Cucchiarelli, 5.Antonio di Zitti (cap), 4.Ivo Mazzucchelli, 3.Enzo Bellinazzo, 2.Lucio Avigo, 1.Carlo Prosperini | | | | Referee: Cuny (France) |
Romania 15.A. Penciu, 14.Vasile Dragomir, 13.Gheorghie Nica, 12.Valeriu Irimescu, 11.Paul Ciobanel, 10.M. Wusek, 9.Adrian Mateescu, 8.Radu Demian, 7.Gheorgie Rascanu, 6.Ion Tutuianu, 5.Mircea Rusu, 4.Vasile Rusu, 3.Gheorghie Stoica, 2.Alexandru Ionescu, 1.Constantin Dinu

== Second division ==
=== Semifinals ===
27 March 1966

| Spain | 3–9 | Portugal |

Madrid

27 March 1966

| Belgium | 9–3 | Netherlands |

Brussels

=== Final ===
24 April 1966

| Belgium | 3–3 | Portugal |

Brussels

== Bibliography ==
- (in Italian) Francesco Volpe, Valerio Vecchiarelli (2000), 2000 Italia in Meta, Storia della nazionale italiana di rugby dagli albori al Sei Nazioni, GS Editore (2000) ISBN 88-87374-40-6
- (in Italian) Francesco Volpe, Paolo Pacitti (Author), Rugby 2000, GTE Gruppo Editorale (1999).
