= 1966–67 FIRA Nations Cup =

European rugby union championship

1966-67 Nations Cup
- Date: 27 November 1966 - 26 May 1967
- Countries: France; Romania; Italy; Portugal

Tournament statistics
- Champions: France
- Grand Slam: France
- Matches played: 6

The Nations Cup 1966-67 was the seventh edition of a European rugby union championship for national teams, and second with the formula and the name of "Nations Cup". The Tournament was won by France, who swept all their matches, with Romania, Italy and Portugal. Portugal, who had the chance to play with the three best teams from Continental Europe, achieved an honourable 6-3 loss to Italy, but, having lost all their matches, were relegated. France did not award caps in their 56-14 win over Portugal abroad.

== First division ==
- Table

| Place | Nation | Games | | | | Points | | | Table points |
| Place | Nation | played | won | drawn | lost | for | against | difference | Table points |
|---|---|---|---|---|---|---|---|---|---|
| 1 | France | 3 | 3 | 0 | 0 | 125 | 30 | 95 | 6 |
| 2 | Romania | 3 | 2 | 0 | 1 | 73 | 18 | 55 | 4 |
| 3 | Italy | 3 | 1 | 0 | 2 | 22 | 87 | -65 | 2 |
| 4 | Portugal | 3 | 0 | 0 | 3 | 23 | 108 | -85 | 0 |

Portugal relegated to second division

- Results

Point system: try 3 pt, conversion: 2 pt., penalty kick 3 pt. drop 3 pt, goal from mark 3 pt.
Click "show" for more info about match (scorers, line-up etc)

| 27 November 1966 | Romania | 3 - 9 | France | Stadionul Dinamo, Bucharest |
| | Pen: Penciu | | Try: Duprat; Salut; Pen: Lacaze | Attendance: 12,000; Referee: P.G. Brook (England) |
| Romania: 15 Vasile Daiciulescu, 14 Alexandru Penciu, 13 Gheorghe Nica, 12 Valeriu Irimescu, 11 Paul Ciobănel, 10 Mihai Wusek, 9 Adrian Mateescu, 8 Gheorghe Stoica, 7 Alexandru Ionescu, 6 Constantin Dinu, 5 Ion Țuțuianu, 4 Vasile Rusu, 3 Gheorghe Rășcanu, 2 Mircea Rusu, 1 Radu Demian (c.) | | | | Attendance: 12,000; Referee: P.G. Brook (England) |
France: 15.Claude Lacaze, 14.Bernard Duprat, 11.Christian Darrouy (c), 13.Jo Maso, 12.Claude Dourthe, 10.Jean-Claude Roques, 9.Jean-Claude Lasserre, 8.Andre Herrero, 7.Jean Salut, 6.Christian Carrere, 5.Walter Spanghero, 4.Benoit Dauga, 3.Arnaldo Gruarin, 2.Jean-Michel Cabanier, 1.Jean-Claude Berejnoi

| 26 March 1967 | France | 60 - 13 | Italy | Stade Mayol, Toulon |
| | Try: Armaudet 9' 19' 34', Rupert 12'; Cabanier 21' Lux 25'; Sitjar 38' Gachassin 52'; 80' Dauga 63' Darrouy 68'; Con: G.Camberabero 9' 19' 21' 25' 34' 52' 80'; Pen: G.Camberabero 8' 48' 63' 69'; Drop: G.Camberabero | | Try: Salmaso 32' Degli Antoni 76'; Prosperini 77'; Con: Di Zitti 75' 77' | Attendance: 9,270; Referee: K. Morgan (Wales) |
| France:15 Pierre Villepreux, 14 Michel Arnaudet, 13 Jean Gachassin, 12 Jean-Pierre Lux, 11 Christian Darrouy (c.), 10 Guy Camberabero, 9 Lilian Camberabero, 8 Jean-Claude Berejnoi, 7 Jean-Nichel Cabanier, 6 Arnaldo Gruarin, 5 Benoît Dauga, 4 Jacques Fort, 3 Michel Sitjar, 2 Jean-Joseph Rupert, 1 André Herrero | | | | Attendance: 9,270; Referee: K. Morgan (Wales) |
Italy:15 Ettore Giugovaz, 14 Giorgio Troncon, 13 Andrea d'Alberton, 12 Roberto Luise III, 11 Vittorio Ambron, 10 Francesco Soro II, 9 Elio Fusco, 8 Antonio di Zitti (c), 7 Giancarlo Degli Antoni, 6 Marco Bollesan, 5 Franco Piccinini, 4 Ivo Mazzucchelli, 3 Enzo Bellinazzo, 2 Oreste Vene', 1 Franco Mazzantini

| 7 May 1967 | Italy | 6 - 3 | Portugal | Stadio "Ferraris", Genoa |
| | Pen: Di Zitti 36' 56' | | Pen: L. Lynce 58' | Referee: Cuny (France) |
| Italy: 15 Luciano Modonesi, 14 Vittorio Ambron, 11 Adriano Agujari, 13 Mauro Gatto, 12 Gastone Giani, 10 Giampiero Ricci, 9 Luciano Bosciano, 8 Marco Bollesan, 7 Franco Cioni, 6 Carlo Prosperini, 5 Antonio di Zitti (c), 4 Franco Gargiulo, 3 Gianni Romagnoli, 2 Uriele Silvestri, 1 Andrea Taveggia | | | | Referee: Cuny (France) |
Portugal15 Pedro Lynce Faria, 14 P. Lencastre, 11 Alberto Quadrio, 13 Luis Matos Chaves, 12 Luis Lynce de Faria, 10 C.V. Pardal, 9 Nunez Silva, 8 J.F.N. Guedes, 7 Carlos Nobre, 6 Raul Martins, 5 Bruno Monteiro, 4 J.M. Vasconcelos, 3 Jorge Miranda, 2 J. Faria, 1 Tomas Mayer

14 May 1967

| Portugal | 14 - 56 | France XV |

University Stadium, Lisbon

| 14 May 1967 | Romania | 24 - 3 | Italy | Stadionul Dinamo, Bucharest |
| | Try: Irimescu 7', Wusek 10' 19'; Baciu 36', Rășcanu 59'; Con: Irimescu 7' 19' 59'; Pen: Irimescu 41' | | Pen: Di Zitti 50' | Referee: Friedlen (East Germany) |
| Romania:15.Vasile Daiciulescu, 14.Mihai Wusek, 13.Mihai Țibuleac, 12.Gheorghe Dragomirescu-Rahtopol, 11.Valeriu Irimescu, 10.Mihai Oblemenco, 9.Petre Florescu, 8.Radu Demian, 7.Mihai Șerbu, 6.Gheorghe Rășcanu, 5.Petre Veluda, 4.Mircea Rusu, 3.Nicolae | | | | Referee: Friedlen (East Germany) |
Italy15.Luciano Modonesi, 14.Mauro Mattei, 13.Andrea d'Alberton, 12.Vittorio Ambron, 11.Mauro Gatto, 10.Gastone Giani, 9.Umberto Conforto, 8.Carlo Prosperini, 7.Antonio di Zitti (cap), 6.Loreto Cucchiarelli, 5.Franco Cioni, 4.Dalmazio Bertoli, 3.Gianni Romagnoli, 2.Uriele Silvestri, 1.Maurizio Bocconcelli

28 May 1967

| Portugal | 6 - 46 | Romania |

University Stadium, Lisbon

== Second division ==
- Table

| Place | Nation | Games | | | | Points | | | Table points |
| Place | Nation | played | won | drawn | lost | for | against | difference | Table points |
|---|---|---|---|---|---|---|---|---|---|
| 1 | Czechoslovakia | 3 | 3 | 0 | 0 | 31 | 13 | 18 | 6 |
| 2 | Spain | 3 | 2 | 0 | 1 | 25 | 14 | 11 | 4 |
| 3 | Morocco | 2 | 0 | 0 | 2 | 0 | 9 | -9 | 0 |
| 4 | Netherlands | 2 | 0 | 0 | 2 | 10 | 30 | -20 | 0 |

Czechoslovakia promoted in first division

- Results

Marocco-Netherlands not played

26 November 1966

| Czechoslovakia | 16 - 5 | Netherlands |

Prague

9 April 1967

| Spain | 3 - 0 | Morocco |

Madrid

23 April 1967

| Netherlands | 5 - 14 | Spain |

Amsterdam

30 April 1967

| Morocco | 0 - 6 | Czechoslovakia |

Casablanca

5 May 1967

| Spain | 8 - 9 | Czechoslovakia |

Madrid

== Bibliography ==
- (in Italian) Francesco Volpe, Valerio Vecchiarelli (2000), 2000 Italia in Meta, Storia della nazionale italiana di rugby dagli albori al Sei Nazioni, GS Editore (2000) ISBN 88-87374-40-6
- (in Italian) Francesco Volpe, Paolo Pacitti (Author), Rugby 2000, GTE Gruppo Editorale (1999).
