= 1967–68 FIRA Nations Cup =

European rugby union championship

1967-68 Nations Cup
- Date: 29 October 1967 - 26 May 1968
- Countries: France; Romania; West Germany; Czechoslovakia

Tournament statistics
- Champions: France
- Matches played: 6

The Nations Cup 1967-68 was the eighth edition of a European rugby union championship for national teams, and third with the formula and the name of "Nations Cup". The tournament was won by France.

== First division ==
- Table (Italy withdraw)

Place	Nation	Games				Points			Table points
Place	Nation	played	won	drawn	lost	for	against	difference	Table points
1	France	3	3	0	0	56	17	39	6
2	Romania	3	2	0	1	47	19	28	4
3	Czechoslovakia	3	1	0	2	18	42	-24	2
4	West Germany	3	0	0	3	19	62	-43	0

- Results

Point system: try 3 pt, conversion: 2 pt., penalty kick 3 pt. drop 3 pt, goal from mark 3 pt.
Click "show" for more info about match (scorers, line-up etc)

29 October 1967

Romania	27 - 5	West Germany

Bucharest

22 November 1967

Czechoslovakia XV	9 - 6	West Germany

Prague

10 December 1967	France	11 - 3	Romania	Stade M.Saupin, Nantes
	Try: Capendeguy; Con: Lacaze; Pen: Lacaze; Drop: Lacaze		Pen: Penciu	Referee: Patrick d'Arcy (Ireland)
France: 15.Claude Lacaze, 14.Jean-Michel Capendeguy, 13.Jean-Pierre Lux, 12.Jean Trillo, 11.Jean-Jacques Lenient, 10.Jo Maso, 9.Jean-Henri Mir, 8.Andre Herrero, 7.Christian Carrere (cap), 6.Jean-Joseph Rupert, 5.Benoit Dauga, 4.Alain Plantefol, 3.Jean-Michel Esponda, 2.Jean-Michel Cabanier, 1.Jean-Claude Berejnoi				Referee: Patrick d'Arcy (Ireland)
Romania: 15. Alexandru Penciu, 14.M. Wusek, 13.Valeriu Irimescu, 12.Gheorghie Dragomirescu-Rahtopol, 11.Gheorghie Nica, 10.M. Oblemenco, 9.Petre Florescu, 8.Radu Demian (cap), 7.Gheorgie Rascanu, 6.Paul Ciobanel, 5.Ion Tutuianu, 4.Petre Veluda, 3.Constantin Dinu, 2.V. Onutiu, 1.Nicolae Baciu

14 April 1968

France XV	26 - 8	West Germany

Lons-le-Saunier

5 May 1968

Czechoslovakia XV	6 - 19	France

Prague

26 May 1968

Romania	17 - 3	Czechoslovakia XV

Bucharest

== Division 2 ==
=== Pool 1 ===
- Table

Place	Nation	Games				Points			Table points
Place	Nation	played	won	drawn	lost	for	against	difference	Table points
1	Poland	2	2	0	0	54	11	43	4
2	Netherlands	2	1	0	1	43	19	24	2
3	Sweden	2	0	0	2	6	73	-67	0

Poland admitted to final

- Results

Point system: try 3 pt, conversion: 2 pt., penalty kick 3 pt. drop 3 pt, goal from mark 3 pt.

12 May 1968

Netherlands	8 - 16	Poland

Sportpark Berestein, Hilversum

24 May 1968

Poland	38 - 3	Sweden

Warsaw

1 June 1968

Sweden	3 - 35	Netherlands

Helsingborg

=== Pool 2 ===
- Table

Place	Nation	Games				Points			Table points
Place	Nation	played	won	drawn	lost	for	against	difference	Table points
1	Morocco	3	2	1	0	26	11	15	5
2	Spain	3	2	0	1	33	11	22	4
3	Portugal	3	1	1	1	19	26	-7	3
4	Belgium	3	0	0	3	6	36	-30	0

Marocco admitted to final

- Results

Point system: try 3 pt, conversion: 2 pt., penalty kick 3 pt. drop 3 pt, goal from mark 3 pt.

17 March 1968

Morocco	6 - 5	Spain

Casablanca

31 March 1968

Spain	14 - 5	Portugal

Estadio Nacional Complutense, Madrid

7 April 1968

Belgium	0 - 14	Spain

Verviers

13 April 1968

Morocco	14 - 0	Belgium

Casablanca

21 April 1968

Portugal	8 - 6	Belgium

Lisbon

5 May 1968

Portugal	6 - 6	Morocco

Lisbon

=== Final ===
2 June 1968

Poland	5 - 0	Morocco

Warsaw

- Poland promoted in first division

== Bibliography ==
- (in Italian) Francesco Volpe, Valerio Vecchiarelli (2000), 2000 Italia in Meta, Storia della nazionale italiana di rugby dagli albori al Sei Nazioni, GS Editore (2000) ISBN 88-87374-40-6.
- (in Italian) Francesco Volpe, Paolo Pacitti (Author), Rugby 2000, GTE Gruppo Editorale (1999).
