= 1966 Five Nations Championship =

37th Rugby Union Five Nations Championship

- Date: 15 January - 26 March 1966
- Countries: England; Ireland; France; Scotland; Wales

Tournament statistics
- Champions: Wales (15th title)
- Matches played: 10
- Tries scored: 21 (2.1 per match)
- Top point scorer: (France) Claude Lacaze (14)
- Top try scorers: (France) Christian Darrouy (2) (Scotland) Sandy Hinshelwood (2) (Scotland) David Whyte (2) (Wales) Ken Jones (2)

The 1966 Five Nations Championship was the thirty-seventh series of the rugby union Five Nations Championship. Including the previous incarnations as the Home Nations and Five Nations, this was the seventy-second series of the northern hemisphere rugby union championship. Ten matches were played between 15 January and 26 March. It was contested by England, France, Ireland, Scotland and Wales.

Wales won their 15th title, with a single loss, while England finished in a disappointing fifth and last place.

== Participants ==
The teams involved were:

Nation	Venue	City	Head coach	Captain
England	Twickenham	London	none	Budge Rogers
France	Stade Olympique Yves-du-Manoir	Colombes	Jean Prat	Michel Crauste
Ireland	Lansdowne Road	Dublin	none	Ray McLoughlin/Tom Kiernan
Scotland	Murrayfield	Edinburgh	none	Stewart Wilson/Ian Laughland
Wales	National Stadium	Cardiff	none	Alun Pask/David Watkins

== Table ==
Pos	Team	Pld	W	D	L	PF	PA	PD	Pts
1	Wales	4	3	0	1	34	26	+8	6
2	France	4	2	1	1	35	18	+17	5
2	Scotland	4	2	1	1	23	17	+6	5
4	Ireland	4	1	1	2	24	34	−10	3
5	England	4	0	1	3	15	36	−21	1

Source: rugbyfootballhistory.com:

== Results ==
1966-01-15

Scotland	3–3	France
Tries: Whyte		Pen.: Lacaze

Murrayfield, Edinburgh
Attendance: 60,000
Referee: D. M. Hughes (Wales)

1966-01-15

England	6–11	Wales
Tries: Perry; Pen.: Rutherford		Tries: Pask; Con.: Price; Pen.: Price (2)

Twickenham Stadium, London
Referee: R. W. Gilliland (Ireland)

1966-01-29

France	11–6	Ireland
Tries: Darrouy (2); Con.: Lacaze; Pen.: Lacaze		Pen.: Gibson; Drops: Kiernan

Stade Olympique Yves-du-Manoir, Colombes
Attendance: 30,947
Referee: P. G. Brook (England)

1966-02-05

Wales	8–3	Scotland
Tries: K. Jones (2); Con.: Bradshaw		Pen.: Wilson

National Stadium, Cardiff
Referee: M. H. Titcomb (England)

1966-02-12

England	6–6	Ireland
Tries: Greenwood; Pen.: Rutherford		Tries: McGrath; Pen.: Kiernan

Twickenham Stadium, London
Referee: R. B. L. Marie (France)

1966-02-26

France	13–0	England
Tries: A. Boniface; Gachassin; Gruarin; Con.: Lacaze (2)

Stade Olympique Yves-du-Manoir, Colombes
Attendance: 37,660
Referee: D. G. Walters (Wales)

1966-02-26

Ireland	3–11	Scotland
Pen.: Kiernan		Tries: Grant; Hinshelwood (2); Con.: Wilson

Lansdowne Road, Dublin
Referee: D. M. Hughes (Wales)

1966-03-12

Ireland	9–6	Wales
Tries: Bresnihan; Pen.: Gibson; Drops: Gibson		Tries: Prothero; Pen.: Bradshaw

Lansdowne Road, Dublin
Referee: R. P. Burrell (Scotland)

1966-03-19

Scotland	6–3	England
Tries: Whyte; Pen.: Blaikie		Drops: McFadyean

Murrayfield, Edinburgh
Referee: K. D. Kelleher (Ireland)

1966-03-26

Wales	9–8	France
Tries: Watkins; Pen.: Bradshaw (2)		Tries: Duprat; Rupert; Con.: Lacaze

National Stadium, Cardiff
Attendance: 60,000
Referee: K. D. Kelleher (Ireland)
