= 1958–59 French Rugby Union Championship =

French Rugby Championship 1958–59
- Countries: France
- Number of teams: 48 teams
- Champions: Racing Paris (4th title)
- Runners-up: Mont-de-Marsan

The 1958–59 French Rugby Union Championship was contested by 48 clubs divided in six pools of eight.

The five better of each pool and the two better 6th (for a sum of 32 clubs) were qualified to play a play-off phase.

The championship was won by Racing Paris that defeated Mont-de-Marsan in the final.

== Context ==
The 1959 Five Nations Championship was won France .

The Challenge Yves du Manoir was won by Dax that beat Pau for 12-8.

== Qualification round ==
In bold the qualified to "last 32" phase

=== Poule A ===
- **Lourdes**
- Chalon
- Lavelanet
- **Vienne**
- Toulouse Olympique EC
- **Brive**
- **Auch**
- Montauban

=== Poule D ===
- **Angoulême**
- **Dax**
- US Bressane
- **Tulle**
- Bègles
- **Touloun**
- Paris Université Club
- **Racing**

=== Poule B ===
- **Toulouse**
- Stade Niortais
- Narbonne
- **La Voulte**
- **Castres**
- **Agen**
- Saint-Claude
- **Mazamet**

=== Poule E ===
- **Perpignan**
- **Cognac**
- Saint-Sever
- **Périgueux**
- Biarritz
- **Graulhet**
- **Chambéry**
- Soustons

=== Poule C ===
- Boucau
- **Pau**
- **Mont-de-Marsan**
- **Aurillac**
- **Bayonne**
- Saint-Girons
- **Stadoceste**
- Romans

=== Poule F ===
- La Rochelle
- **Grenoble**
- **Béziers**
- Tyrosse
- **Cahors**
- **Vichy**
- Carmaux
- **Montferrand**

== "Last 32" ==
In bold the clubs qualified for the next round

Team 1	Team 2	Results
Lourdes	Graulhet	12-6
Béziers	Brive	13-9
Pau	Toulouse Olympique EC	30-3
Dax	Vichy	9-0
Racing	Montferrand	8-0
Vienne	Auch	3-3
Grenoble	Tulle	12-6
Toulon	Toulose	14-6
La Voulte	Cognac	6-0
Perpignan	Stadoceste	8-3
Mazamet	Montauban	23-3
Bayonne	Chambéry	13-3
Mont-de-Marsan	Agen	5-0
Castres	Angoulême	15-0
Périgueux	Aurillac	19-0
Biarritz	Cahors	6-3

== "Last 16" ==
In bold the clubs qualified for the next round

Team 1	Team 2	Results
Lourdes	Béziers	6-5
Pau	Dax	12-6
Racing	Vienne	6-0
Grenoble	Toulon	5-3
La Voulte	Perpignan	3-0
Mazamet	Bayonne	6-3
Mont-de-Marsan	Castres	6-0
Périgueux	Biarritz	16-3

== Quarter of finals ==
In bold the clubs qualified for the next round

Team 1	Team 2	Results
**Lourdes**	Pau	**9-8**
**Racing**	Grenoble	**14-5**
**La Voulte**	Mazamet	**3-0**
**Mont-de-Marsan**	Périgueux	**20-3**

== Semifinals ==
Team 1	Team 2	Results
**Mont-de-Marsan**	La Voulte	**16-9**
**Racing**	Lourdes	**19-3**

== Final ==
Teams	**Racing** - Mont-de-Marsan
Score	**8-3**
Date	24 May 1959
Venue	Parc municipal des sports, Bordeaux
Referee	Albert Ferrasse
Line-up
Racing	Roger Labernède, Claude Obadia, Jean-Pierre Beigbeder, Serge Grousset, Stéphane Boize, François Moncla, Michel Crauste, Marc Paillassa, Henri Lasserre, Louis Fernandez, Robert Navarre, Emile Barbaste, Arnaud Marquesuzaa, Alain Chappuis, Michel Debet
Mont-de-Marsan	Pierre Cazals, Pierre Pascalin, Jean-Baptiste Amestoy, Paul Tignol, Pierre Capbert, Jean-Roger Bourdeu, Jacques Bourdeu, Ferdinand Roumat, Pierre Lacroix, Louis Requenna, Christian Darrouy, André Boniface, Guy Boniface, Gérard Dagès, Francis Darroze
Scorers
Racing	1 try Boize, 1 conversion and 1 penalty Debet
Mont-de-Marsan	1 try Guy Boniface

François Moncla, Michel Crauste and Arnaud Marquesuzaa
