= Clive Ashby =

English rugby union player

- Full name: Rowland Clive Ashby
- Born: 24 January 1937 Lorenzo Marques, Portuguese Mozambique
- Died: 21 May 2015 (aged 78) High Wycombe, England
- Occupation: Company Director

Rugby union career
- Position: Scrum-half
International career
Years	Team	Apps	(Points)
1966–67	England	3	(3)

Rowland Clive Ashby (24 January 1937 – 21 May 2015) was an English international rugby union player.

Ashby was born to South African parents in Lorenzo Marques, Mozambique. He moved to England with his family in 1951 and finished his secondary education at Royal Grammar School, High Wycombe.

A Wasps scrum-half, Ashby won his first England call up after their 1966 Five Nations opener against Wales, selected to replace Jeremy Spencer who had underperformed. He played back to back matches against Ireland and France. His third and final cap came the following year in England's loss to Australia at Twickenham and he crossed for a consolation try late in the second-half. He also represented Barbarians, East Midlands and Buckinghamshire.

== See also ==
- List of England national rugby union players
