= David H. Cooke =

England international rugby union player

David Cooke
- Born: David Howard Cooke; 19 November 1955 (age 70) Brisbane, Queensland, Australia
- Height: 186 cm (6 ft 1 in)
- Weight: 110 kg (17 st 5 lb)
- School: Haileybury College
- Occupation: Chartered Surveyor

Rugby union career
- Position: Open Side Flanker
Senior career
Years	Team	Apps	(Points)
1974-1987	Harlequins	257	(108)
- Correct as of Harlequins
International career
Years	Team	Apps	(Points)
1981-1985	England	12	(0)

David Cooke is an English former rugby union player who represented England from 1981 to 1985.

== Early life ==
David Cooke was born on 19 November 1955 at Oyster Point in Brisbane.

Cooke came to England with his parents Harold and Mary when they repatriated in 1959 from Australia because of his father's terminal illness. As a family they then lived in Thornton Heath, Surrey and following his father's death in 1965, Cooke, his mother and younger brother Merriman moved to Purley. Cooke's mother remarried in 1973 and his stepfather John Haseldine suggested that Cooke go to boarding school. He continued his education at the age of 13 at Haileybury College in Hertfordshire.

== Rugby union career ==
Cooke first picked up a rugby ball at Haileybury College at the age of 13. He was spotted as an outstanding talent by the coach at Haileybury, Danny Hearn, an ex-England player who taught and coached from a wheelchair.

Cooke had been selected to play for a combined public schools Team called the Nomads when scouted for the Harlequins as a 19-year-old alongside Clive Woodward and after leaving school in the summer of 1974 Cooke played his first game as the Harlequins number eight in November against Rosslyn Park marking the England and Lions player Andy Ripley. This was the beginning of a career with the club finishing after 14 seasons on his retirement from the game in 1987. Cooke was dropped only once in his Harlequins career by coach All Black Earle Kirton for missing a training session to go surfing.

In the first two seasons at Harlequins he fitted in playing for Indonesia in the first Hong Kong 7's in 1976 and Hong Kong Colony in 1978 against France - his first of three games against the French flanker Jean-Pierre Rives to whom he was regularly likened.

Having gained honours for England U23 and England B, Cooke joined the England squad in 1979 as understudy to Tony Neary and remained a permanent fixture until 1985.

Cooke made his international debut on 17 January 1981 at Cardiff Arms Park in the Wales vs England Five Nations match. Of the twelve matches he played for England he was on the winning side six times.

Cooke was called off the pitch at the Harlequins' Stoop Ground in January 1985, when playing a morning match against the Army, to play for England against Romania over the road at Twickenham in the afternoon. The selected player for the England number 7 shirt that day - Gary Rees - had suspected appendicitis and Cooke was the closest flanker that the England selectors could call up from the England hotel in Richmond 2 hours before the game. Cooke had not played for England since 1983 and he seized the opportunity.

The coach Dick Greenwood then selected Cooke for the England side for the rest of that season. Cooke asked him to be England vice-captain and lead the pack of forwards through the following Five Nations internationals and the summer tour of New Zealand, when his loyalty and performances were rewarded with the captaincy of England. Cooke played his final match for England on 8 June 1985 at Athletic Park, Wellington in the New Zealand vs England 2nd Test on that tour.

Being the longest serving captain of the Harlequins, Cooke also captained Middlesex (leading them to win the county Championship in 1985), London Division and the Barbarians.

Cooke was inducted into the Harlequins Hall of Fame on 21 November 2006.

== Post rugby career ==
After his rugby career Cooke threw himself into business, having studied and qualified as a chartered surveyor whilst playing rugby. He currently runs a property consultancy practice out of Central London. Cooke also has a passion for historic motor racing and dirt biking. He started racing in the historic motor racing scene in 1998. In 2012 he set up the Desert Rats Off Road Trails Club for like minded older racers who were brought up like Cooke around motorbikes.

He has two children by his first wife Lisa. Following a very public divorce on the front-page newspapers he went on to marry second wife Karen, with whom he has two children. Cooke now lives in Oxfordshire.
