= Terry Arthur =

English rugby union player (1940–2022)

Terry Gordon Arthur
- Full name: Terence Gordon Arthur
- Born: 5 September 1940 Hartlepool, England
- Died: 18 February 2022 (aged 81)
- Height: 5 ft 11 in (180 cm)

Rugby union career
- Position: Centre
International career
Years	Team	Apps	(Points)
1966	England	2	(0)

Terence Gordon Arthur (5 September 1940 – 18 February 2022) was an English international rugby union player.

Arthur was born in Hartlepool and attended West Hartlepool Grammar.

A Cambridge blue, Arthur was capped twice for England as a centre in the 1966 Five Nations, partnering with varsity teammate David Rosser on his debut match against Wales. He also played against Ireland at Twickenham. At club level, Arthur made over 100 appearances with Wasps and later played for Moseley.

Arthur had noted career as an actuary.

== See also ==
- List of England national rugby union players
