= Bill Treadwell =

England international rugby union player

- Full name: William Thomas Treadwell
- Born: 13 March 1939 (age 87) Ealing, London, England
- Height: 6 ft 0 in (183 cm)
- School: St Benedict's School, Ealing
- Occupation: Dentist

Rugby union career
- Position: Hooker
International career
Years	Team	Apps	(Points)
1966	England	3	(0)

William Thomas Treadwell (born 13 March 1939) is an English former international rugby union player.

Born in Ealing, Treadwell attended a Convent School during the war and was later educated at St Benedict's School.

Treadwell, a hooker, made his first XV debut for Wasps at the age of 19 and played rugby with Guy's Hospital, while studying dentistry. He was capped three times for England in the 1966 Five Nations Championship.

A dentist by profession, Treadwell practiced in Twyford and in Henley-on-Thames. In 1987 he became the official dental surgeon of the Rugby Football Union based in the dental suite at Twickenham. In 2018 after 31 years as the duty dentist at Twickenham, he stepped down from the role where he was tasked with looking after the broken, chipped and missing teeth of England’s warriors. He began a three-year term as Wasps club president in 1994.

Treadwell has been secretary of the England Rugby International Club (ERIC) for over 30 years, based at the ERIC Clubroom in the new West Stand at Twickenham which holds 300 people. He stepped down from this role at the England v Scotland 6 Nations match on 22nd February 2025.

== See also ==
- List of England national rugby union players
