= Dick Stafford =

England international rugby union player

Richard Calvert Stafford
- Born: Richard Calvert Stafford; 23 July 1893 Bedford, England
- Died: 1 December 1912 (aged 19) Bedford, England
- School: Bedford Modern School

Rugby union career
- Position: Prop
Senior career
Years	Team	Apps	(Points)
- Bedford
International career
Years	Team	Apps	(Points)
1912	England	4	

Richard Calvert Stafford (23 July 1893 – 1 December 1912) was an English rugby union player. He played four times for the England national rugby union team in 1912 but died later that year aged only nineteen.

== Life ==
Stafford was born on 23 July 1893 in Bedford, a member of a family of local auctioneers. He was educated at Bedford Modern School where he was successful at rowing, athletics and rugby union.

Stafford made his debut for Bedford Blues in March 1909, aged fifteen and became club captain in September 1911. By this time he had already appeared in a trial match for the England national team, and another appearances in a trial match in 1912 led to his selection for the national side. He made his England debut against Wales at Twickenham on 20 January 1912 and played in all four games of the 1912 Five Nations Championship, which England won jointly with Ireland.

Dick Stafford began the 1912–13 season as captain of Bedford again and represented the East Midlands county side but was forced to stop playing in November by injury and illness and was diagnosed with terminal cancer of the spine. He died on 1 December 1912 and his funeral was marked by shops and businesses in Bedford closing.

As a player, Stafford was a forward, usually listed as a prop in modern publications although there was less specialisation of positions in 1912. A local paper assessed him as "almost prodigal of his powers, doing the work of two men in the scrum and, in the loose, racing across to take up a three-quarter movement, or hurling an opponent to earth with that terrible tackle of his", and in the 1911–12 season he scored 14 tries for Bedford in 22 matches.
