= Pierre Lacaze (rugby) =

France international dual-code rugby player

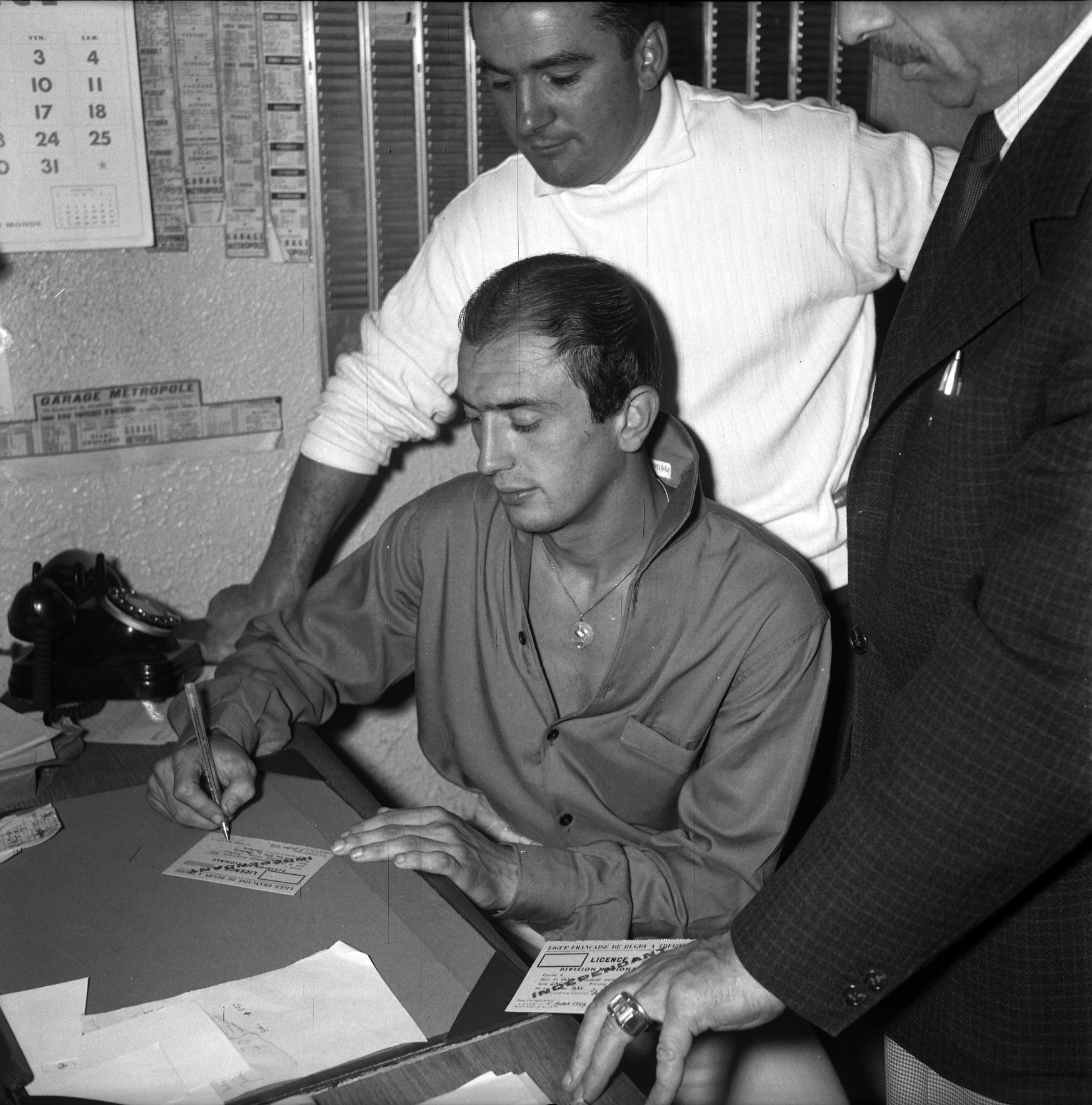
- Pierre Lacaze in 1959

Personal information
- Born: 4 May 1934 Pontacq, Pyrénées-Atlantiques, Nouvelle-Aquitaine, France
- Died: 8 July 1995 (aged 61) Lourdes, France

Playing information
- Height: 1.68 m (5 ft 6 in)
- Weight: 68 kg (10 st 10 lb)

Rugby union
Club
Years	Team	Pld	T	G	FG	P
19??–??	Papillons de Pontacq
19??–??	Racing Club de France
1954–59	FC Lourdes
	Total	0	0	0	0	0
Representative
Years	Team	Pld	T	G	FG	P
1958–59	France	7	0	1		14

Rugby league
- Position: fullback
Club
Years	Team	Pld	T	G	FG	P
1959	Toulouse Olympique
	FC Lezignan
	Marseille XIII
	Grenoble Olympique
	XIII Catalan
	Montpellier XIII
	Total	0	0	0	0	0
Representative
Years	Team	Pld	T	G	FG	P
1960–67	France	12	0	40	0	80
- Source: As of 19 January 2021
- Relatives: Claude Lacaze (brother)

Pierre Lacaze (4 May 1934 - 8 July 1995) was a French international rugby player, both union and league. His younger brother, Claude, was also a France rugby union & league international player. He was nicknamed Papillon (Butterfly) and was 1.68 m high and weighed 68 kg.

== Rugby ==
He took up rugby union with his local Pontacq club, followed by Racing Club de France and lastly FC Lourdes; winning caps for France too. He played as fly-half or as fullback.

In 1959, he switched codes to play rugby league, first for Toulouse, then FC Lezignan; also winning international caps for France.

== International rugby union career ==
He won his first test cap against South Africa on 26 July 1958 and his last against Ireland on 18 April 1959. He was part of the squad which won against Springboks in South Africa for the first time on 16 August 1958 during a historical tour for the French team. He replaced a severely injured Michel Vannier as fullback for France.

- 7 caps
- 3 drop goals, 1 penalty, 1 conversion, 14 points
- Caps per season : 2 in 1958, 5 in 1959
- Champion of the 1959 Five Nations Championship

== Honours ==
=== Rugby union ===
- Frantz Reichel Cup:
  - Champion (1) : 1954 for Racing
- Challenge Yves du Manoir :
  - Winner (1) : 1956
- French Championship First Division :
  - Champion (3) : 1956, 1957 et 1958
  - Runner-up (1) : 1955

=== Rugby league ===
- French Champion for Toulouse Olympique (scoring 26 points during this match) (1965)
- Winner of the Lord Derby Cup for FC Lézignan (1970)
- Runner-up for Toulouse Olympique (1962, 1963, 1964, 1968) and for FC Lézignan (1971)
