= George Sherriff (rugby union) =

England international rugby union player

- Full name: George Albert Sherriff
- Born: 29 May 1937 (age 89) Stepney, London, England

Rugby union career
- Position: No. 8
International career
Years	Team	Apps	(Points)
1966–67	England	3	(0)

George Albert Sherriff (born 29 May 1937) is an English former international rugby union player.

Born in Stepney, London, Sherriff came late to rugby, picking up the sport aged 24. He began playing for Saracens in 1963 and won Middlesex representative honours in his second season.

Sherriff was capped three times for England as a number eight, debuting against Scotland in the 1966 Five Nations. His other appearances came against the 1966–67 Australian and 1967–68 New Zealand touring sides.

Retiring a one-club player in 1973, Sherriff remained involved with Saracens and was appointed president in 1989.

== See also ==
- List of England national rugby union players
