= Bedford Blues =

English rugby union club, based in Bedford

(England) Bedford Blues
- Full name: Bedford Blues
- Union: East Midlands RFU
- Founded: 1886; 140 years ago
- Location: Bedford, England
- Ground: Goldington Road (Capacity: 5,531 (1,700 seated))
- Coach: Mike Rayer
- Captain: Alex Day
- League: Champ Rugby
- 2025–26: 2nd of 14 (runners-up in play-offs)
| 1st kit | 2nd kit |

Official website
- www.bedfordrugby.co.uk

Bedford Blues are a semi-professional rugby union club in the town of Bedford, England, currently playing in Champ Rugby at the 2nd tier of the English rugby union system.

== History ==
=== Foundation and 19th century ===
Bedford RUFC was founded in 1886 after an amalgamation between Bedford Rovers (1876) and Bedford Swifts (1882). Both parent clubs had close connections with Bedford School and Bedford Modern School, and both had fixtures with the leading teams of the period. The Bedford colours of dark and light blue are believed to be a reflection of the schoolmasters association with Oxbridge and the full badge colours are based on the strip of Swifts (black) and Rovers (cerise).

Under the captaincy of Alfred Parrott, a Bedford Modern School master, the new club made an auspicious start, losing only once in its first season (to Leicester) and again only once in its second (to a composite London XV). The early successes, however, paled before the achievements of 1893–94, when the club's reputation persuaded opponents of the stature of Stade Francais, from Paris, and the Barbarians to make the journey over. These two distinguished teams suffered the fate of all other visitors to the club's ground in that marvelous season, defeated by scores of 22–0 and 7–3 respectively in front of huge crowds. Indeed, the club would complete its normal programme unbeaten, only to lose when somewhat understrength, in an extra match arranged as an Easter Monday attraction at Coventry (0–12). The season's final record was 29 played, 27 won, one drawn and one lost, with 521 points and only 49 against. Records created that season stood for many years and winger H.M Morris still holds the highest try-scoring tally with 38 scores in a season.

While the success on the playing field had been good there was often a problem of where to play at home. There were two main sites where pitches could be made available. One was known as 'The House of Industry' ground in Goldington Road. This was the field in front of the House of Industry -now known as the North Wing Hospital. This is approximately where Bedford play now. The other site was known as Midland Road Ground, an area near the Queen's Park railway bridge.

The first matches in 1886–87 were in Goldington Road — where the Bedford Swifts had played — but during the next few seasons several pitches near the railway station were used. It was recorded in local papers at the time that at least one game was played in the field where Queens Works now stands. The railway and industry required this land and Bedford Rugby returned to the Goldington Road area before an agreement in 1895 was reached with Bedford Cricket Club who actually held the lease. The pitch was laid out in virtually the same spot as it is now.

=== Beginning of the century ===
The club's record prior to 1905 was good enough to bring the all Blacks to the town for the first time. The match itself was a great attraction with the town's schools and factories closing for the half day to enable people to attend. The result (0–41 to New Zealand) was similar to the fate that most club sides suffered in their successful tour. Only Wales beat them.

In the seasons immediately preceding World War I the fixture list grew stronger, and the club lost only one game in 1913–14. The facilities had also improved. With a better playing arena, the first stand had been erected in 1905 and in 1910 a new pavilion was built. At that time it was considered one of the best rugby club pavilions in the country. The fact that it is still standing (now known as the 'Scrumhall' bar) is proof of the quality of workmanship and materials.

The First World War threatened the club's existence when the ground was taken over by the Military Authorities for use as an Army Camp. In 1921 the club was likely the first, and certainly many years before Leicester Tigers and Bristol Bears, to implement the use of letters on the backs of player jerseys instead of numbers. Things did improve very quickly and by the late twenties and early thirties Bedford once again were at the top. Even today some older supporters consider this the club's best ever period - practically every member of the team in 1938–39 was very close to international honours. Further improvements had been made at the ground, the biggest being the stand opened in 1933 which is still in use today.

=== Post war yo-yo era ===
The club recovered again after the Second World War and continued to play all the leading clubs and had a great spell in the mid sixties. There were three Bedford players regularly in the England team with David Perry and Budge Rogers captaining their county. In 1969–70 season Bedford won the Sunday Telegraph English-Welsh rugby union table. Probably, the Blues finest hour was in 1975 when Bedford, captained by Budge Rogers beat Rosslyn Park in the final of the Knock Out Cup at Twickenham 28–12. There was a gate of nearly 18,000 which at the time was a record attendance.

Unfortunately this achievement did not continue with the club having little success resulting in many players with great potential leaving the club. There were bright moments such as John Orwin captaining the England touring party to Australia and Fiji in 1988. When the leagues were introduced in 1987-88 Bedford were in Division 2, promoted to Division 1 in 1989 but relegated immediately to finish in Division 3 for a period.

=== The professional era ===
At the start of the 1996–97 season when 'The Blues' were in Division 2 the club turned professional. Frank Warren (the boxing promoter) and Sports Network putting in a big investment to secure quality players, many of whom were internationally famous, while others were young but promising. The best example is probably Scott Murray who until June 2008 was Scotland's most capped international. At the second attempt Bedford easily won the Allied Dunbar Division 2 Championship in 1998 and were promoted to Division 1 and were runners up in the Cheltenham & Gloucester Cup. Financial problems with the club's owners resulted in the club losing many players but there was a nucleus that remained loyal. The Club Coach and Director of Rugby also left.

=== The decline ===
Bedford Rugby Football Club in the late 19th century, featuring H. H. Morris (back row, seated second from right).

In April 1999 Sports Network sold the club to Jefferson Lloyd International but this was a financial disaster resulting in Bedford losing further staff. The club was about to be sold and moved from the town, which would have meant the end of first class rugby in Bedford. Following intervention by the RFU in October 1999 a consortium of Bedford businessmen headed by David Ledsom (SDC), Mike Kavanagh, Geoff Irvine (Irvine-Whitlock), David Gunner and David Rawlinson with assistance from Bedford Borough Council and other professional people, the transfer of the club to Bedford Blues Ltd. was organised. Several thousand supporters and businesses in the town bought shares and the club is now viable. The club is now sponsored by Charles Wells Brewery and many other local companies. Bedford have been playing on virtually the same pitch for over 100 years and 32 players have gained International honours while they were actually playing for the club at the time of being honoured.

=== Stability ===
Mike Rayer, an ex-player of the club and Cardiff RFC, has introduced a free-flowing style which saw Bedford rise to 2nd in the league in 2006, only held back by the dominance of Harlequins, who had been demoted from the Premiership the year before.

The 2006 season had seen the commencement of a relationship with Leicester Tigers, the prominent Premiership side, which allowed some of Leicester's most promising young players to gain experience by playing for Bedford in National Division One. Within the next five years it was hoped that 50% of the club's players would have been brought into the squad through the academy and youth teams.

The 2006–07 Academy Colts became champions of the English Colts Club Knockout Cup after beating Redruth at Franklin's Gardens. 2007–08 season saw the Colts win the cup again. Being the first Colts team to retain the cup.

== Bedford Blues Women ==
Back in 2017 the Bedford Blues produced a development plan to help further grow female participation in the game of rugby in the town of Bedford and the surrounding area. The plan initially included the development of school aged rugby, providing rugby for girls aged 11 to 17. Over the following three seasons the Bedford Blues successfully set up and run three separate age group teams; U13s, U15s & U18s. With numbers across all three age groups rapidly growing, a realisation that there was no clear pathway for the girls to follow locally in Women's rugby was recognised. The development plan was updated to include the goal of creating a Women's rugby team under the Bedford rugby umbrella.

The idea then became a reality in January 2020 when the first training session was held with 12 players attending on a cold Saturday morning. The team continued to increase its numbers over the preceding year, even during the COVID-19 situation, building up a healthy roster of over 30 players. The following season (2021–22) the Bedford Blues Women became a league team, playing in the NC3 Midlands (Central) League, led by head coach Mark Stapley. The Bedford Blues Women play their home matches at Goldington Rd and at Bedford Athletic RFC ground.

On Sunday 10 October 2021, Emma Graham made history by being the first player to score points for the Bedford Blues Women Rugby Union Team during their first match against Shelford Nomads, played at Goldington Rd (with the Blues Women winning 31–0)

The 2022–23 season saw the Bedford Blues Women competing in NC2 Midlands (Central), coached by Peter Frost and Daryl Veenendaal and captained by Emma Graham, they played 4 games at Goldington Road, and ended their first season in the new league in 4th place.

The 2023–24 season saw the women's side playing all their home matches at Goldington Road, and competing in NC2 Midlands (South). There was also a coaching team change with Mark “Eddie” Rennell, former Bedford Rugby player, taking over from Veenendaal. Lucy Middleton led the team to finish the season with 12 victories making them undefeated during the season and winning promotion to NC1 East.

At the start of the 2024-2025 season, Peter Frost stood down as joint head coach, to leave Rennell in sole charge.

== Goldington Road Stadium ==
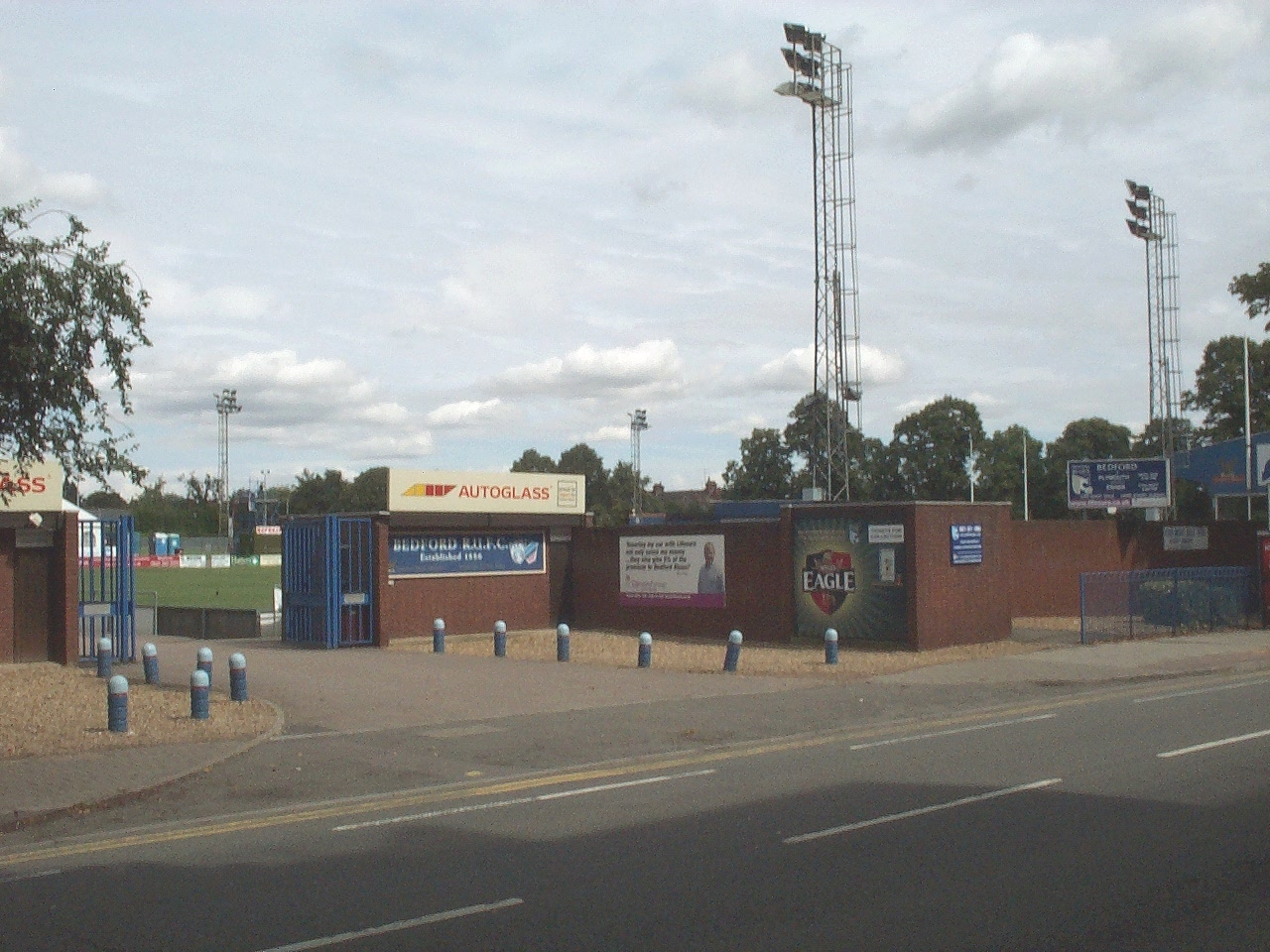
Goldington Road Stadium

Goldington Road is the home ground of the Bedford Blues, with a capacity of 5,531, usually drawing 2500+ people with each home game. Towards the end of the 05–06 season, two new temporary stands were built for the big home tie against Harlequins, at one point these stands were made a long term part of the stadium, along with the grounds public house and original stand. As of the 06–07 season the extra stands have been removed.

== Kit ==
The club kit was supplied by Kooga from at least 2004 up until the 2011–2012 season and then supplied by Zoo Sport Ltd before changing back to Gilbert on 1 September 2020. The kit is sponsored by three companies; The front of the team shirt by Blue Chip, the sleeves by Wells Bombardier and the back by Lifesure insurance.

| Year | Supplier | Chest | Sleeves | Back |
|---|---|---|---|---|
| 1996–2000 | Gilbert | Dexion | unknown | unknown |
| 2006–2008 | Kooga | Autoglass | Wells Bombardier | Lifesure |
| 2008–2010 | Kooga | Autoglass | Wells Bombardier | Lifesure |
| 2010–2011 | Kooga | Autoglass | Wells Bombardier | Lifesure |
| 2011–2014 | Zoo Sport Ltd | Autoglass | Wells Bombardier | Lifesure |
| 2015–2020 | Zoo Sport Ltd | Blue Chip | Wells Bombardier | Lifesure |
| 2020–2021 | Gilbert | | Wells Bombardier | |
| 2021–2022 | Gilbert | Service Express sdc ac plc | Eagle Brewery dovecote park carter sullivan trust insurance stonbury SDG | Butterwell Budgens Berwick Homes |

== Special events ==
=== Ladies Day ===
October is Breast Cancer Awareness Month and to support the charity Breast Cancer Care the Blues hold a yearly 'Ladies Day' home match at Goldington Road. The team wear a unique Kooga pink strip for the game with the playing shirts auctioned giving proceeds to Breast Cancer Care. https://web.archive.org/web/20111003121344/https://www.medocmall.co.uk/images/theclubshop_bedford_tickets/products/large/KSSHIRT.gif

=== The Mobbs Memorial Match ===
The Mobbs Memorial Match is held annually in memory of Edgar Mobbs, an England international who was killed in the First World War. Mobbs played for Northampton and was educated at Bedford Modern School. Between 2008 and 2011 the match was played at Goldington Road between Bedford Blues and the Barbarians. From 2012 to April 2023 it was played alternately at Goldington Road and the Northampton Saints ground at Franklin's Gardens, with the host club facing the British Army team. From 2024 the match will be played as a preseason game between Bedford and Northampton.

| Year | Home | Score | Away |
|---|---|---|---|
| 2008 | Bedford | 19–34 | Barbarians |
| 2009 | Bedford | 45–76 | Barbarians |
| 2010 | Bedford | 50–14 | Barbarians |
| 2011 | Bedford | 35–43 | Barbarians |
| 2013 | Bedford | 43–29 | Army |
| 2015 | Bedford | 47–24 | Army |
| 2023 | Beford | 38–10 | Army |

== League history ==
BEDFORD RUGBY CLUB LEAGUE HISTORY
| Year | League | Level | Position | Other |
|---|---|---|---|---|
| 1987–88 | Courage League Division Two | 2 | 5th | - |
| 1988–89 | Courage League Division Two | 2 | 2nd (P) | Promoted to Division One |
| 1989–90 | Courage League Division One | 1 | 12th | Relegated to Division Two |
| 1990–91 | Courage League Division Two | 2 | 8th | - |
| 1991–92 | Courage League Division Two | 2 | 10th | - |
| 1992–93 | Courage League Division Two | 2 | 7th | Relegated to Division Three |
| 1993–94 | Courage League Division Three | 3 | 3rd | - |
| 1994–95 | Courage League Division Three | 3 | 1st | Promoted to Division Two |
| 1995–96 | Courage League Division Two | 2 | 9th | - |
| 1996–97 | Courage League Division Two | 2 | 4th | - |
| 1997–98 | Allied Dunbar Premiership Division Two | 2 | 1st | Promoted to Allied Dunbar Premiership |
| 1998–99 | Allied Dunbar Premiership | 1 | 13th | - |
| 1999–00 | Allied Dunbar Premiership | 1 | 12th | Relegated to National Division One |
| 2000–01 | National Division One | 2 | 11th | - |
| 2001–02 | National Division One | 2 | 6th | - |
| 2002–03 | National Division One | 2 | 7th | - |
| 2003–04 | National Division One | 2 | 7th | - |
| 2004–05 | National Division One | 2 | 7th | Powergen Shield Winners |
| 2005–06 | National Division One | 2 | 2nd | Powergen National Trophy runner-up |
| 2006–07 | National Division One | 2 | 7th | - |
| 2007–08 | National Division One | 2 | 6th | - |
| 2008–09 | National Division One | 2 | 3rd | - |
| 2009–10 | RFU Championship | 2 | 4th | RFU Championship play-off semi-finalists |
| 2010–11 | RFU Championship | 2 | 2nd | RFU Championship play-off semi-finalists, British and Irish Cup runner-up |
| 2011–12 | RFU Championship | 2 | 2nd | RFU Championship play-off semi-finalists |
| 2012–13 | RFU Championship | 2 | 3rd | RFU Championship Finalists, British and Irish Cup semi-finalists |
| 2013–14 | RFU Championship | 2 | 9th | - |
| 2014–15 | RFU Championship | 2 | 10th | - |
| 2015–16 | RFU Championship | 2 | 4th | RFU Championship play-off semi-finalists |
| 2016–17 | RFU Championship | 2 | 8th | |
| 2017–18 | RFU Championship | 2 | 3rd | (play-offs for promotion were abolished and replaced by the first ranked team being promoted) |
| 2018–19 | RFU Championship | 2 | 3rd | |
| 2019–20 | RFU Championship | 2 | 8th | |
| 2020–21 | RFU Championship | 2 | 8th | |
| 2021–22 | RFU Championship | 2 | 5th | |
| 2022–23 | RFU Championship | 2 | 4th | |
| 2023–24 | RFU Championship | 2 | 4th | |
| 2024–25 | RFU Championship | 2 | 2nd | |
| 2025–26 | Champ Rugby | 2 | 2nd | |

== Honours ==
=== Men's honours ===
- John Player Cup winners: 1975
- Courage League Division Three champions: 1994–95
- Allied Dunbar Premiership Division Two champions: 1997–98
- Powergen Shield winners: 2005

=== Women's honours ===
- RFU NC3 Midlands (central) champions: 2021–22
- RFU NC2 Midlands (south) champions: 2023–24

== Current standings ==
2026–27 Champ Rugby table
| Pos | Team | Pld | W | D | L | PF | PA | PD | TF | TA | TB | LB | Pts | Qualification |
|---|---|---|---|---|---|---|---|---|---|---|---|---|---|---|
| 1 | Ealing Trailfinders | 7 | 6 | 0 | 1 | 337 | 154 | +183 | 53 | 23 | 6 | 1 | 31 | Play-off semi-finals |
| 2 | Worcester Warriors | 7 | 6 | 0 | 1 | 304 | 150 | +154 | 47 | 22 | 4 | 0 | 28 | Play-off semi-finals |
| 3 | Coventry | 7 | 6 | 0 | 1 | 321 | 203 | +118 | 48 | 31 | 3 | 1 | 28 | Play-off quarter-finals |
| 4 | Chinnor | 7 | 5 | 0 | 2 | 237 | 212 | +25 | 37 | 33 | 2 | 0 | 22 | Play-off quarter-finals |
| 5 | Rotherham Titans | 7 | 5 | 0 | 2 | 209 | 255 | −46 | 32 | 38 | 1 | 0 | 21 | Play-off quarter-finals |
| 6 | Bedford Blues | 7 | 4 | 0 | 3 | 228 | 206 | +22 | 35 | 30 | 4 | 1 | 21 | Play-off quarter-finals |
| 7 | Cornish Pirates | 7 | 4 | 0 | 3 | 241 | 241 | 0 | 36 | 36 | 3 | 0 | 19 | |
| 8 | Ampthill | 7 | 4 | 0 | 3 | 229 | 278 | −49 | 35 | 42 | 0 | 0 | 16 | |
| 9 | Doncaster Knights | 7 | 3 | 0 | 4 | 223 | 224 | −1 | 33 | 33 | 1 | 2 | 15 | |
| 10 | Richmond | 7 | 2 | 0 | 5 | 191 | 240 | −49 | 29 | 38 | 0 | 1 | 9 | |
| 11 | Caldy | 7 | 1 | 0 | 6 | 218 | 282 | −64 | 33 | 43 | 0 | 3 | 7 | |
| 12 | Blackheath | 7 | 1 | 0 | 6 | 192 | 260 | −68 | 25 | 39 | 0 | 3 | 7 | Relegation play-off |
| 13 | Nottingham | 7 | 1 | 0 | 6 | 169 | 255 | −86 | 25 | 39 | 0 | 3 | 7 | Relegation play-off |
| 14 | Hartpury | 7 | 1 | 0 | 6 | 149 | 288 | −139 | 21 | 44 | 0 | 1 | 5 | Relegated |

Updated to match(es) played on 8 November 2026. Source:
Rules for classification: If teams are level at any stage, tiebreakers are applied in the following order:
1. Number of matches won
2. Number of matches drawn
3. Difference between points for and against
4. Total number of points for
5. Aggregate number of points scored in matches between tied teams
6. Number of matches won excluding the first match, then the second and so on until the tie is settled

== Current squad ==
The Bedford Blues squad for the 2026–27 season is:

Bedford Blues 2026–27 Champ Rugby squad
| **Props**: (Ireland) Joey Conway; (Wales) Will Davies-King; (Ireland) Oisin Heffernan; (England) Jamie Jack; (England) Monty Royston; (England) Ollie Scola (Note: Northampton Saints players who are dual-registered with the club for the 2025-26 season.); (England) Sonny Tonga'uiha (Note: Northampton Saints players who are dual-registered with the club for the 2025-26 season.); **Hookers**: (England) James Fish; (England) Tommy Herman; **Locks**: (England) Archie Appleby (Note: Northampton Saints players who are dual-registered with the club for the 2025-26 season.); (Wales) Ilan Evans; (England) Rory Ward; (England) Harry Wells; (England) Alex Woolford | **Back row**: (England) Fyn Brown (Note: Northampton Saints players who are dual-registered with the club for the 2025-26 season.); (England) Dan Eckersley; (England) Nicholas Finch; (England) Kayde Sylvester; (Samoa) Fred Tuilagi; (Fiji) Tui Uru; **Scrum-halves**: (England) Alex Day; (England) James Lennon; **Fly-halves**: (England) Will Maisey; (England) Tom Price | **Centres**: (England) Michael Le Bourgeois; (England) Billy Pasco (Note: Northampton Saints players who are dual-registered with the club for the 2025-26 season.); (England) Lucas Titherington; (England) George Worth; **Wings**: (England) Dean Adamson; (England) Ryan Hutler; **Fullbacks**: (England) Louie James |
**(c)** denotes the team captain. (vc) denotes vice-captain. **Bold** denotes internationally capped players.^{ST} denotes a short-term signing. Source:

== International players ==
- Martin Bayfield (England)
- Lee Dickson (England)
- Billy Twelvetrees (England)
- Mouritz Botha (England)
- Andy Gomarsall (England) - 2003 World Cup Winner
- Danny Hearn (England)
- John Orwin (England)
- (England) Jeff Probyn
- Paul Sackey (England)
- Rory Underwood (England) and (British Lions)
- David Perry (England)
- Budge Rogers (England) - first English player to be honoured by the Queen when he was appointed an OBE in 1969
- Dick Stafford (England)
- Tony Jorden (England)
- Bob Wilkinson (England)
- Derek Wyatt (England)
- Sam Stanley (England 7s)
- (United Kingdom) Martin Offiah (Great Britain)
- Grayson Hart (Scotland)
- Ali Price (Scotland)
- Craig Moir (Scotland)
- Scott Murray (Scotland and British Lions)
- Billy Steele (Scotland)
- Clem Boyd (Ireland U21s)
- Corey Hircock (Ireland U19s)
- Darragh O'Mahony (Ireland)
- Chris Czekaj (Wales)
- Jason Forster (Wales)
- Mike Rayer (Wales)
- Paul Turner (Wales)
- Ben Alexander (Australia)
- Alistair Murdoch (Australia)
- Justin Blanchet (Canada)
- Norm Hadley (Canada)
- James Pritchard (Canada)
- Gareth Rees (Canada)
- Scott Stewart(Canada)
- (United States) Will Hooley (USA)
- Rudolf Straeuli (South Africa) - 1995 World Cup Winner
- Junior Paramore (Samoa)
- Soane Tongaʻuiha (Tonga and Pacific Islanders)
- Marco Rivaro (Italy)
- Matthew Cook (Spain)
- Martina Sharp (Slovakia 7s Women)
- Matt Worley (Hong Kong)
