= Lyn Davies (rugby union) =

- Born: 2 February 1940 Blaengarw, Wales
- Died: 15 September 2004 (aged 64) Bridgend, Wales
- Height: 6 ft (183 cm)
- Weight: 14.5 st (203 lb; 92 kg)

Rugby union career
- Position: Centre / Wing
International career
| Years | Team | Apps | (Points) |
| 1966 | Wales | 3 | (0) |

Lyn Davies (2 February 1940 — 15 September 2004) was a Welsh international rugby union player.

Davies was born in Blaengarw and worked as a colliery worker.

A bulky three-quarter, Davies was nicknamed "Tanky" for his ability to barge through defences. He played with the Army during national service, the Welsh Guards, London Welsh and won his Wales caps while at Bridgend, making three appearances as a winger in the 1966 Five Nations Championship.

== See also ==
- List of Wales national rugby union players
