= David Rosser =

England international rugby union player

- Full name: David William Albert Rosser
- Born: 27 March 1938 (age 88) Portsmouth, England
- School: Rochdale Grammar School
- University: Christ's College, Cambridge

Rugby union career
- Position: Centre
International career
Years	Team	Apps	(Points)
1965–66	England	5	(0)

David William Albert "Dai" Rosser (born 27 March 1938) is an English former international rugby union player.

Born to a Welsh father and English mother, Rosser was born in Portsmouth and attended Rochdale Grammar School, before undertaking tertiary studies at the Christ's College, Cambridge. He gained a blue his first year of rugby with Cambridge University RUFC and toured South Africa with a combined Oxford/Cambridge side.

Rosser was capped five times as a centre for England, while playing for Wasps. He featured in all four of England's 1965 Five Nations matches, debuting against Wales at Cardiff, then played Wales again in the 1966 Five Nations.

== See also ==
- List of England national rugby union players
