= Andy Hancock =

England international rugby union player

- Full name: Andrew William Hancock
- Born: 19 June 1939 Dartford, England
- Died: 9 February 2020 (aged 80)

Rugby union career
- Position: Wing
International career
Years	Team	Apps	(Points)
1965–66	England	3	(3)

Andrew William Hancock (19 June 1939 – 9 February 2020) was an English international rugby union player.

Hancock was born in Dartford and attended Framlingham College.

A short and stocky winger, Hancock gained three England caps in the Five Nations and is best remembered for his last-minute try which secured a draw in a Calcutta Cup match against Scotland at Twickenham, when he gathered the ball in his own 22 and sprinted past four defenders to cross in the corner. The try prevented Scotland from getting their first win in London for 27-years and meant they finished with the wooden spoon.

Hancock had a long career, playing with Cambridge, Cambridge University, Chelmsford, Eastern Counties, London University, Northampton, Stafford, Staffordshire and Wasps. He retired aged 39.

== See also ==
- List of England national rugby union players
