= Danny Hearn =

English rugby union player (born 1940)

- Full name: Robert Daniel Hearn
- Born: 12 August 1940 (age 86) Cheltenham, England
- School: Cheltenham College
- University: Trinity College Dublin; University of Oxford
- Occupation: Teacher

Rugby union career
- Position: Centre
International career
Years	Team	Apps	(Points)
1966–67	England	6	(0)

Robert Daniel Hearn (born 12 August 1940) is an English former international rugby union player.

Born in Cheltenham, Gloucestershire, Hearn attended Cheltenham College and then studied at Dublin's Trinity College. His rugby form for Trinity College caught the attention of local selectors, as he qualified for Ireland due to having an Irish parent, but England secured his services by calling him up first.

Hearn, a centre, was an Oxford blue in 1964 and was playing for Bedford when he made the England squad for the 1966 Five Nations, making his debut against France at Colombes. He also featured against Scotland at Murrayfield. In 1967, Hearn appeared in all four Five Nations fixtures, before suffering neck and spinal injuries which have left him a quadriplegic. He was playing for Midlands & Home Counties against the touring All Blacks at Welford Road in Leicester on 28 October 1967 when he broke his neck while attempting to tackle Ian MacRae. Approaching MacRae from the side, Hearn came in for a low tackle, but having slightly mistimed it had his head crash into the powerful New Zealander's hip, causing his neck to dislocate. He spent 10 months recuperating at Stoke Mandeville Hospital.

A former teacher, Hearn coached rugby during his time at Haileybury and after retiring in 2000 has lived in Ireland, settling with wife Jean in the town of Skibbereen, County Cork.

== See also ==
- List of England national rugby union players
