= Alun Pask =

Welsh rugby union footballer (1937–1995)

- Born: Alun Edward Islwyn Pask; 10 September 1937 Blackwood, Caerphilly, Wales
- Died: 1 November 1995 (aged 58) Blackwood, Caerphilly, Wales
- School: Pontllanfraith Grammar
- University: Loughborough University

Rugby union career
- Position: No. 8
Senior career
| Years | Team | Apps | (Points) |
- Loughborough Colleges
| – | Abertillery | | |
| – | Barbarian F.C. | | |
| – | Monmouthshire County RFC | | |
International career
| Years | Team | Apps | (Points) |
| 1961-1967 | Wales | 26 | (6) |
| 1962-1966 | British & Irish Lions | 8 | (0) |

Alun Edward Islwyn Pask (10 September 1937 – 1 November 1995) was a Wales international rugby union player and captain. He was a long serving (29 years) and highly respected teacher at Tredegar Comprehensive School.

Pask was capped twenty-six times by Wales between 1961 and 1967, twenty-three times as a flanker and three times as at number eight. He scored two tries for Wales, the first on his international debut and toured South Africa with Wales in 1964. He captained Wales in six internationals and led the side to victory in the 1966 Five Nations Championship. He was selected for the 1962 British Lions tour to South Africa, playing in three of the four internationals against South Africa, and the 1966 British Lions tour to Australia and New Zealand where he played in both tests against Australia and three of the four against New Zealand.

He played club rugby for Abertillery.
