= Colin Payne (rugby union) =

England international rugby union player

- Full name: Colin Martin Payne
- Born: 19 May 1937 Edmonton, England
- Died: March 2005 (aged 67) Bedford, England
- School: Sherborne School
- University: University of Oxford

Rugby union career
- Position: Lock
International career
Years	Team	Apps	(Points)
1964–66	England	10	(3)

Colin Martin Payne (19 May 1937 – March 2005) was an English international rugby union player.

Payne was educated at Sherborne School.

A lock, Payne played for Harlequins, Oxford University, Warwickshire and England.

Payne was a member of the national team between 1964 and 1966, making all 10 of his Test match appearances in Five Nations fixtures. He scored England's only try in their 9–6 win over France in 1965.

== See also ==
- List of England national rugby union players
