= Jeremy Spencer (rugby union) =

England international rugby union player

- Born: 27 June 1939 (age 87)
- School: Guildford Grammar School

Rugby union career
- Position: Scrum-half
International career
Years	Team	Apps	(Points)
1966	England	1	(0)

Jeremy Spencer (born Jeremie Spencer; 27 June 1939) is an English former rugby union international.

A Guildford Grammar School product, Spencer was capped once by England, selected from Harlequins to play as scrum-half against Wales at Twickenham in the 1966 Five Nations. He later spent time on the Basque coast, playing rugby for French first division club Saint-Jean-de-Luz, while also working as a school teacher.

Outside of rugby, Spencer was an artist, musician and self described beatnik, whose residences included an old air raid shelter in Ripley, a double decker bus and an engine shed.

== See also ==
- List of England national rugby union players
