= Raul Martins =

Portuguese rugby union player and coach

Raul Martins is a former Portuguese rugby union player. He played as the number eight.

== Career ==
Martins had 21 caps for Portugal, from 1967 to 1981, being the captain in 18 of them. After finishing his player career, he became a coach, and took charge of the U-18 National Team. Martins was the chairman of the Portuguese Rugby Board from 1987 to 1999.

He joined the FIRA-AER Executive Board in 1999. He is a member of the IRB Council.

Professionally, he is shareholder and Managing Director of a Portuguese Group of Companies in the Construction, Real Estate and Hotel Sectors.
