= Montfort-en-Chalosse =

- Commune
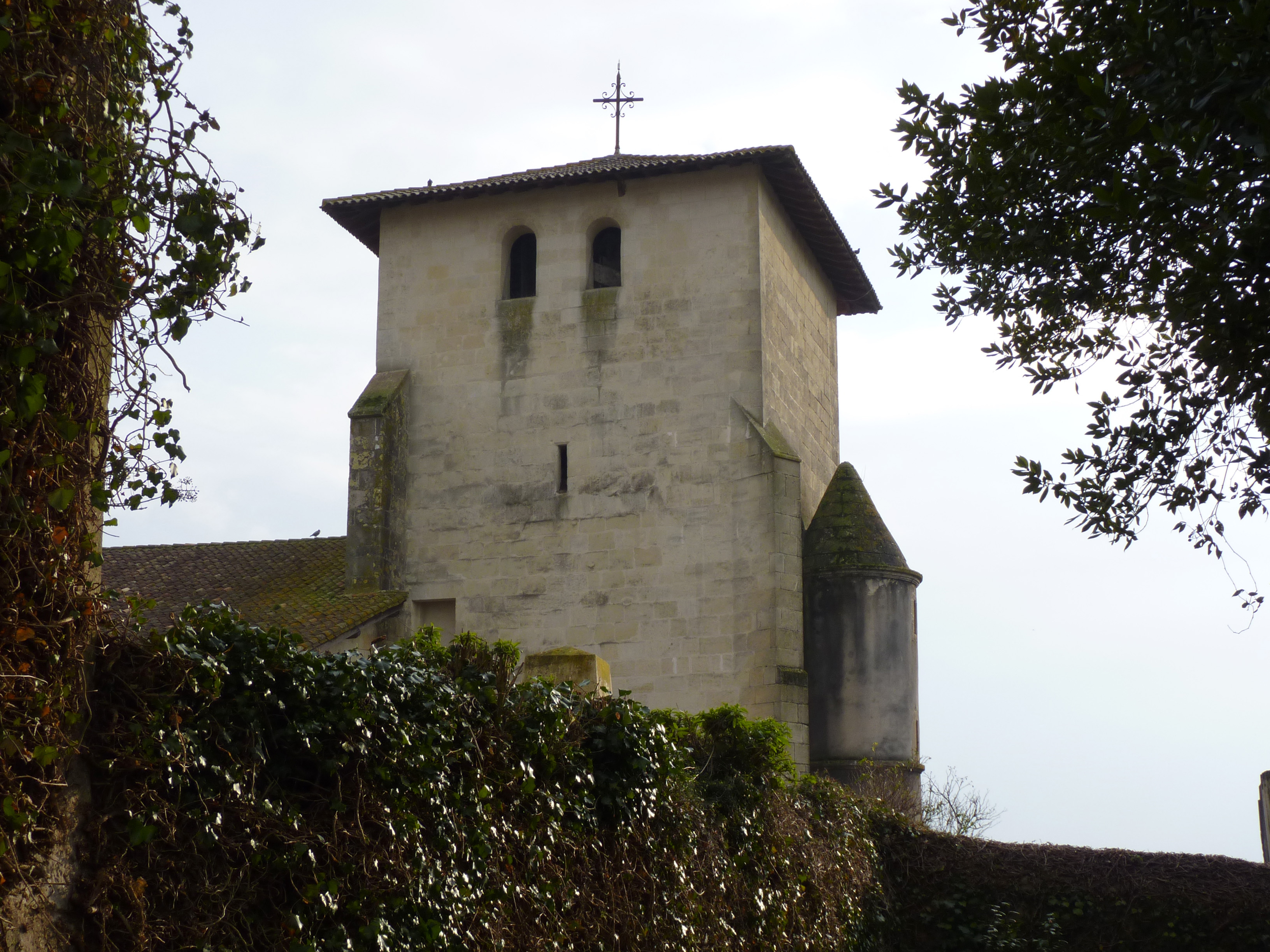

- Coat of arms
- Location of Montfort-en-Chalosse
- Location within France Location within Nouvelle-Aquitaine
- Coordinates: 43°42′42″N 0°50′12″W
- Country: France
- Region: Nouvelle-Aquitaine
- Department: Landes
- Arrondissement: Dax
- Canton: Coteau de Chalosse
- Intercommunality: Terres de Chalosse

Government
  - Mayor (2020–2026): Jean-Marie Darricau
- Area^{1}: 11.57 km^{2} (4.47 sq mi)
- Elevation: 110 m (360 ft)
- Highest elevation: 108 m (354 ft)
- Lowest elevation: 26 m (85 ft)
- Population (2023): 1,242
  - Density: 107.3/km^{2} (278.0/sq mi)
- Time zone: UTC+01:00 (CET)
  - Summer (DST): UTC+02:00 (CEST)
- INSEE/Postal code: 40194 /40380
- ^{1} French Land Register data, which excludes lakes, ponds, glaciers > 1 km^{2} (0.386 sq mi or 247 acres) and river estuaries.

Montfort-en-Chalosse (French pronunciation: [mɔ̃fɔʁ ɑ̃ ʃalɔs], literally Montfort in Chalosse; Gascon: Monhòrt de Shalòssa, before 1962: Montfort) is a commune in the Landes department in Nouvelle-Aquitaine in southwestern France.

== Population ==
Historical population
Year	Pop.	±% p.a.
1968	1,114	—
1975	1,017	−1.29%
1982	1,031	+0.20%
1990	1,116	+1.00%
1999	1,210	+0.90%
2007	1,152	−0.61%
2012	1,160	+0.14%
2017	1,177	+0.29%
2023	1,242	+0.90%
Source: INSEE

== Politics ==
Between 2001 and 2014, Françoise Dartigue-Peyrou was the mayor.

Christian Bouet was a town councillor until 2014. He had 7 terms for 43 years, a record in Montfort-en-Chalosse.

== See also ==
- Communes of the Landes department

== Gallery ==
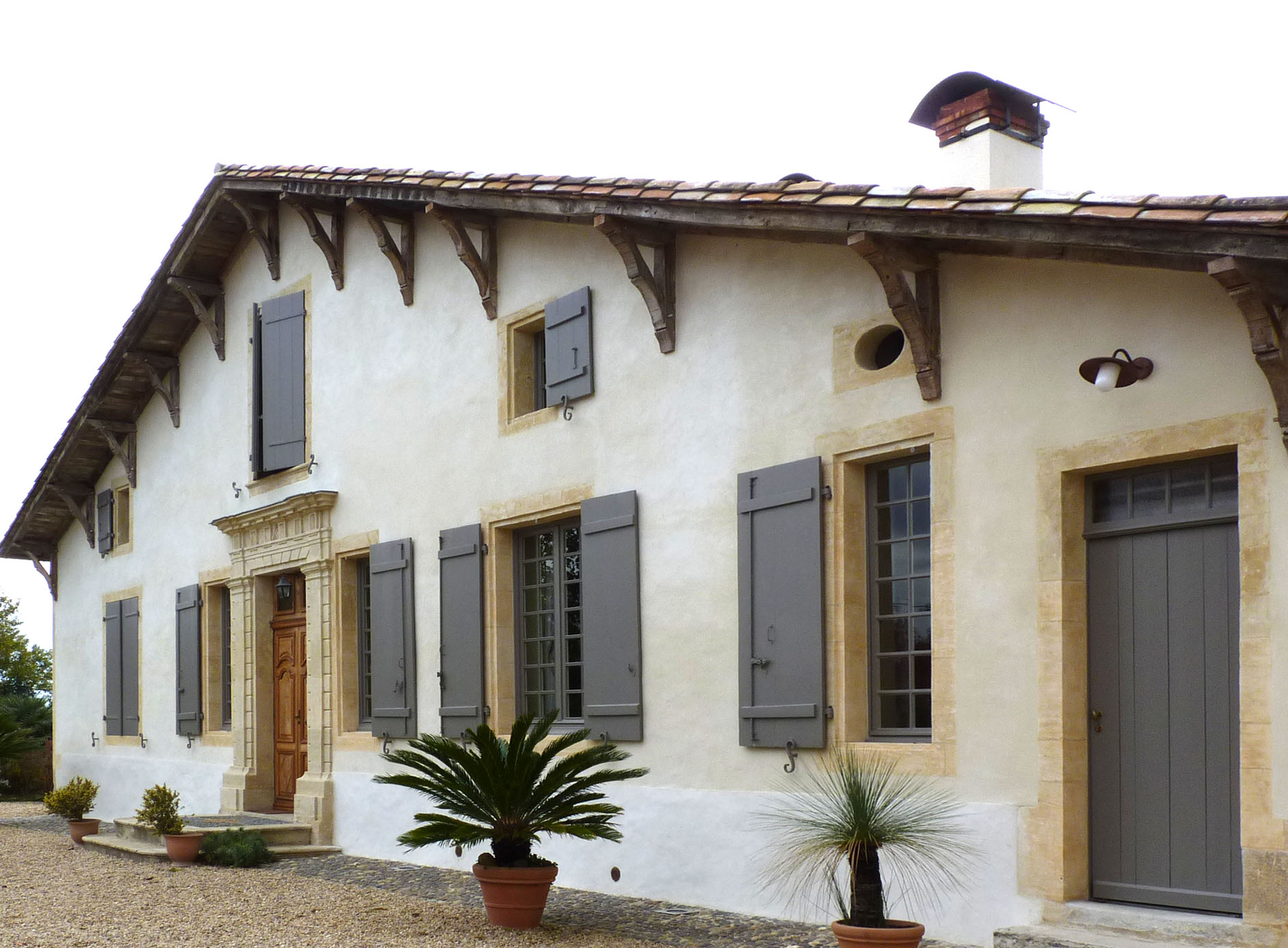
Example of a maison capcazalière in Montfort-en-Chalosse
