= David Whyte (rugby union) =

Scotland international rugby union player

- Born: David James Whyte; 21 February 1940 Cupar, Scotland
- Died: 25 November 2021 (aged 81) Kirkcaldy, Scotland
- Height: 1.73 m (5 ft 8 in)
- School: Bell Baxter High School
- University: University of St Andrews; St Edmund Hall, Oxford

Rugby union career
- Position: Wing
Amateur team(s)
Years	Team	Apps	(Points)
- Howe of Fife
–	St Andrews University		
–	Oxford University		
–	Edinburgh Wanderers		
Provincial / State sides
Years	Team	Apps	(Points)
- North and Midlands
International career
Years	Team	Apps	(Points)
- Scottish Universities
1962-67	Barbarians		
1965-67	Scotland	13	(0)

David Whyte (21 February 1940 – 25 November 2021) was a Scotland international rugby union player. He was also a noted Long Jumper and represented Scotland at the sport.

== Rugby Union career ==
=== Amateur career ===
Whyte went to primary at Castlehill in Cupar, before moving to Bell Baxter High School. He played for the high school side.

He played a few times for Howe of Fife.

He went to St. Andrews University to study English Language and Literature. He played for the University of St Andrews rugby union side and then captained the side.

At Oxford University he studied for a Diploma in Education; and there he earned a blue and played rugby union for Oxford University.

He played for Edinburgh Wanderers.

He was part of their Sevens side which won the Miller Cup in the Edinburgh Charity Sevens of 1966, beating Oxford University in the final.

=== Provincial career ===
He played for North and Midlands at the school level, before playing for their senior side.

=== International career ===
He captained the Scottish Universities XV while at St. Andrews and Oxford Universities.

He made a Barbarians debut in 1962, before being capped for Scotland.

He received 13 caps for Scotland between 1965 and 1967.

== Athletics career ==
=== Amateur career ===
He represented Dundee Hawkhill Harriers. When he moved to Edinburgh, he then represented the Edinburgh Southern Harriers.

=== International career ===
He represented both Scotland and Great Britain at the long jump.

He won 3 Scottish Championship titles at long jump; and one at triple jump.

He won the 1959 British Championship long jump at White City in London.

== Teaching career ==
He was a teacher at various schools in Scotland, including Strathallan School in Perthshire; and in 1983 became a rector of Golspie High School in Sutherland. He was a founder member of the East Sutherland Rotary Club.

== Death ==
In his eighties he moved back to Dunfermline to be closer to his family. He died in Victoria Hospital, Kirkcaldy after a short illness.
