= Jean-Claude Roques =

France international rugby union player

- Born: 19 March 1943 (age 83) Brive-la-Gaillarde, France
- Height: 5 ft 9 in (175 cm)
- Weight: 159 lb (72 kg)

Rugby union career
- Position: Fly-half
International career
Years	Team	Apps	(Points)
1966	France	4	(0)

Jean-Claude Roques (born 19 March 1943) is a French former international rugby union player.

Roques was born in Brive-la-Gaillarde and spent his entire rugby career with local side CA Brive. His father was also involved with CA Brive, working as a cashier at the club's stadium.

A fly-half, Roques is remembered as one of the pioneers of the kick pass and was capped four times for France. He made all of his international appearances in 1966, beginning with two Five Nations matches, then away fixtures against Italy and Romania. The following year, Roques made the squad for a tour of South Africa, but didn't add to his caps.

== See also ==
- List of France national rugby union players
