= Don Rutherford =

British Lions & England international rugby union player

- Born: 22 September 1937 Tynemouth, England
- Died: 13 November 2016 (aged 79)
- School: Tynemouth High School
- University: St Luke's College, Exeter
- Occupation: Rugby player

Rugby union career
- Position: Fullback
Amateur team(s)
| Years | Team | Apps | (Points) |
- Preston Grasshoppers
| – | St Luke's College | | |
| – | RAF | | |
| – | Combined Services | | |
| – | Percy Park | | |
| – | Wasps | | |
| – | Gloucester | | |
Provincial / State sides
| Years | Team | Apps | (Points) |
| – | Gloucestershire | | |
| - | Northumberland | | |
International career
| Years | Team | Apps | (Points) |
| 1960–1967 | England | 14 | (36) |
| 1966 | British Lions | 1 | (5) |
| – | Barbarian F.C. | | |

Donald Rutherford OBE (22 September 1937 – 12/13 November 2016) was an England international rugby union player and administrator. He was the first ever Technical Director of the Rugby Football Union at Twickenham, becoming Director of Rugby where he served with distinction from 1969 – 1999.

During his career he played for St Luke's College, RAF, Combined Services, Percy Park, Wasps and Northumberland. However he is most closely associated with Gloucester and Gloucestershire for whom he played from 1964 to 1968.

He won fourteen caps for England, the first in 1960 against Wales, which England won 14–0; and toured Australia and New Zealand with the 1966 British Lions. He appeared for the Barbarians on a number of occasions between 1960 and 1968 including one as captain.

== Early life ==
Don Rutherford trained as a physical education teacher at St Luke's College, Exeter. He did his National Service in the RAF. He played for the RAF and Combined Services and while still in the RAF he had his first England trial in 1958, playing for the Whites against the Colours (scrum half for the Colours in that trial was Micky Booth).

He had already joined Percy Park RFC in Northumberland and played for the club until 1963.

== Rugby career ==
During that time Rutherford won his first four caps for England in the 1960 Five Nations tournament and appeared against South Africa at Twickenham in January 1961. He played an outstanding game for North East Counties against the All Blacks in January 1964.

At the end of the 1963–64 season Rutherford joined Gloucester. He made his debut for Gloucestershire in November 1964 and was selected for the first of the 1965 Home Internationals, scoring the winning points in a surprise win against France 9–6. He was an ever-present for England in the Five Nations in 1964–65 and 1965–66.

During his period at Gloucester, he was appointed as senior master in charge of PE, rugby and swimming at Wycliffe College in nearby Stonehouse.

He was selected to tour Australia and New Zealand with the British Lions. He played in the first of the two Internationals against Australia but on the New Zealand leg of the tour he broke his arm playing against Manuwatu, which required a metal plate and had to be flown home. He played once more for England against New Zealand in 1967.

Rutherford had a successful season for Gloucester and Gloucestershire in 1967–68. He captained the club, playing with remarkable consistency and scoring over 300 points. He broke his arm again playing for the Barbarians against Newport in April 1968 and he was advised to retire from the game.

== Administration ==
While with Gloucester, Don Rutherford introduced a coaching creed that was continued in the successful years that followed under the captaincy of Dick Smith.

Rutherford became Technical Director of the Rugby Union in September 1969 – their first-ever professional appointment. In 30 years at the RFU he initiated coaching and playing programmes, which have been emulated by rugby playing countries across the world. He was made Director of Rugby and built up a nationwide structure, starting with mini-rugby through to the national team, providing a stream of playing talent.

He returned to Kingsholm in October 1973, having assembled an international team to play Gloucester in their centenary game.

== Death ==
It was announced on 14 November 2016 that Rutherford had died over the previous weekend at the age of 79.

== Awards ==
- OBE in 2000 in recognition of his services to rugby.
- Fellow of the British Institute of Sports Coaches (now N.C.F)
- Dyson Award in 1999 for Sportscoach
- Awarded Master of Education by the University of Leicester in 1980.

== Publications ==
Written:

- Rugby for Coach and Player (1971) + Japanese Version (1974)
- Better Rugby / Even Better Rugby (1973 / 1985)
- A Guide for Players (1974)
- Teach Yourself Rugby (1975)
- Fitness Training For Rugby (1978) + 8 Wallcharts
- Mini Rugby – It's The Real Thing (1980) + Film
- England's Year – Part 1 & 2 (1980)
- France's Year (1980)
- International Rugby for Players (1983)
- Improving Backplay

Edited and written

- The RFU Preliminary, Intermediate and Coaching Awards (1970)
- RFU Education pack
- Even Better Rugby
- Positional Skills (10) – Revised / Rewritten (1974), compendium and 10 separate books on each position
- Fit to Referee and Touch Judge
- 100 Years of Rugby – International Rugby Football Board
- Recruit or Die
- Mini Rugby Booklet
- Instigated the RFU Technical Journal (1994 – )

== Video ==
- Play Rugby (1974) series of 10 films for BBC TV
- Better Rugby Series:
  - Development of Skills
  - Confidence in Contact
  - Unit Skills
  - The Coaches Programme
- Even Better Rugby
- Mini Rugby – It's the Real thing
- So You Want To Be A Referee?
- So You Want To Be A Better Referee?
- Rugby Series for the BBC (1973) – 10 programmes with Ray Williams (WRFU)
- Positional Skills – Backs – Full Back, Wing, Centre, Outside Half, Scrum Half (5 videos)
- Positional Skills – Forwards – Hooker, Props, Locks, Flanker, No.8 (5 videos)
- Back to the Future – The Wavell Wakefield Trust provides opportunities for young players to develop their skills.
- Running Rugby – The Wavell Wakefield Trust provides opportunities for young players to develop their skills.
- England Entertains the 1988 Wallabies – Highlights from games with comments from coaches
- Understanding the Game – The Winning Way – 4 editions
- Top Coaches – The Winning Edge
- Tries of the Season
- Behind The Scenes (1988 Wallabies)
- Recruit or Die
- RFU Museum "Twickenham"
