= Budge Rogers =

British Lions & England international rugby union player

Derek Prior "Budge" Rogers OBE, born in Bedford on 20 June 1939 and educated at Bedford School, is a former rugby union player who captained Bedford and played at international level for both England and the British Lions.

His club Bedford recovered after the Second World War and continued to play all the leading teams and had a great spell in the mid-1960s. There were three Bedford players regularly in the England team with David Perry and Rogers captaining their country. In the 1969–1970 season Bedford won the Sunday Telegraph English-Welsh Rugby Table. The Blues finest hour was probably in 1975 when Bedford, captained by Budge Rogers, beat Rosslyn Park in the final of the Knock Out Cup (now EDF Energy Cup) at Twickenham 28–12. There was a gate of nearly 18,000 which at the time was a record attendance.

He later played for the Barbarians. He managed the England under 23s to Canada 1977. The RFU organised an England tour to the Far East and England, led by Budge Rogers, played two tests in Japan and two tests in Colombo. In the mid-1980s he was chairman of the England selectors. In 2000 he was managing the England team. In 2001 he was the RFU President. In 2000 he was elected to the board of Trustees of the Lord's Taverners.

He was also the holder of the England record of 34 caps, subsequently beaten, British Lion and Barbarian many times over, captain of England on seven occasions and the first English player to be honoured by the Queen for his services to football.

He owned a Jowett Jupiter HKY 770 from 1960 to 1964.

Sporting positions
Preceded by David Perry	English National Rugby Union Captain; 1966	Succeeded by Richard Sharp
Preceded by Dick Greenwood	English National Rugby Union Captain; 1969	Succeeded by Bob Hiller
