= Jean-Claude Lasserre =

France international rugby union player

- Born: 12 May 1938 (age 88) Hussein Dey, French Algeria
- Height: 5 ft 9 in (175 cm)
- Weight: 158 lb (72 kg)

Rugby union career
- Position: Scrum-half
International career
Years	Team	Apps	(Points)
1963–67	France	13	(3)

Jean-Claude Lasserre (born 12 May 1938) is a French former international rugby union player.

Lasserre was born in Hussein Dey, French Algeria, and grew up in Mont-de-Marsan, where he attended Victor-Duruy high school. He played rugby during his youth with the Stade Montois cadets.

A scrum-half, Lasserre was capped 13 times for France between 1963 and 1967, participating in three Five Nations campaigns. He spent his entire senior career with US Dax, which he went on to coach.

Lasserre was a dental surgeon by profession.

== See also ==
- List of France national rugby union players
