= David Perry (rugby union) =

England international rugby union player

David Gordon Perry (26 December 1937 – 8 April 2017) was an England international rugby union player and captain.

== Career ==
Perry was capped 15 times for England between 1963 and 1966, making thirteen appearances at number eight and two at lock. He scored two international tries, and captained England in all four internationals in the 1965 Five Nations Championship.

He played for Cambridge in the 1958 Varsity match and played club rugby for Bedford. He played four matches for Leicester Tigers at the end of the 1959–60 season.

Perry and his wife Dorne had four grown-up daughters. As well as his life in Rugby, he was a director of Waddingtons, the playing card and board game manufacturers.

He died in April 2017 at the age of 79.

Sporting positions
Preceded by Ron Jacobs	English National Rugby Union Captain; 1965	Succeeded by Budge Rogers
