= Gareth Prothero =

British Lions & Wales international rugby union footballer

Gareth John Prothero (born 7 December 1941 (age 83)) is a former Wales international rugby union player.

Prothero was capped eleven times by Wales as a flanker between 1964 and 1966 and scored one try for his country. He was selected for Wales' first overseas tour in 1964 and played in the Welsh rugby team's first match outside Europe and its first in the Southern Hemisphere; he played against East Africa in Nairobi on 12 May 1964, Wales winning 8–26.

Prothero was selected for the 1966 British Lions tour to Australia and New Zealand, but did not play in any of the internationals.

He played club rugby for Bridgend.

Currently, Prothero resides in Pentwyn, South Wales having retired from club rugby in 1972.
