= Ken Jones (rugby union, born 1941) =

British Lions & Wales international rugby union footballer (1941–2022)

- Born: David Kenneth Jones; 7 August 1941 Cross Hands, Carmarthenshire, Wales
- Died: 24 August 2022 (aged 81)
- School: Gwendraeth Grammar
- University: University College, Cardiff; Oxford University
- Occupation(s): teacher industrialist

Rugby union career
- Position: centre / wing
Amateur team(s)
Years	Team	Apps	(Points)
- Oxford University RFC
–	Penygroes RFC		
–	Llanelli RFC		
–	Cardiff RFC		
–	London Welsh RFC		
–	Barbarian F.C.		
International career
Years	Team	Apps	(Points)
1962–1966	Wales	14	(6)
1962–1966	British Lions	6	(9)

David Kenneth Jones (7 August 1941 – 24 August 2022) was a Welsh international rugby union player.

== Early life and education ==
Jones was born in Cross Hands, Carmarthenshire on 7 August 1941. He was educated at Gwendraeth Grammar School; University College, Cardiff, where he took a BSc in 1963; and Merton College, Oxford (1963-4). Whilst at Oxford he played for Oxford University RFC.

== Rugby career ==
He was capped fourteen times by Wales as a centre between 1962 and 1966.[3] He scored five tries for Wales. He was selected for Wales' first overseas tour in 1964 and played in the Welsh rugby team's first match outside of Europe (and its first in the Southern Hemisphere) against East Africa in Nairobi on 12 May 1964, Wales winning 8-26.

Jones was only 21 when selected for the 1962 British Lions tour to South Africa and played in the first three internationals, scoring one try. He stayed in South Africa after the 1962 tour where he played for Paarl. He was also selected for the 1966 British Lions tour to Australia and New Zealand, and played in both internationals against Australia and the first international against the All Blacks, scoring two tries in the latter match. He also toured South Africa with Wales in 1964.

As a student he was offered a professional contract by Leeds rugby league and again by St George in Australia during the 1966 Lions tour but resolved to stay in rugby union on both occasions. Leeds offer of £12,000 would have been a world record fee at the time. Jones retired from rugby at 27 having played club rugby for Llanelli and Cardiff where he spent 5 years at each club.

After retirement from rugby at 27, Jones worked for the Confederation of British Industry (CBI) in Wales as part of a team charged with attracting inward investment from Japanese corporates into Wales. Jones helped bring Takiron (the plastics subsidiary of Itochu, one of Japan’s biggest trading companies) to Wales where he joined as MD before subsequently becoming its Chairman. Jones was on the board of governors of Cardiff University and the University of Wales, as well as Chairman of governors of the Museum of Welsh Life, St Fagans and a council member of the National Museum of Wales.

== Personal life and death ==
Jones had two children, Mark and Sara. He died on 24 August 2022, at the age of 81.
