= Stewart Wilson =

Scotland international rugby union player

- Born: Stewart Wilson; 22 October 1942 (age 84)
- University: University of Oxford

Rugby union career
- Position: Fullback
Amateur team(s)
Years	Team	Apps	(Points)
- London Scottish
International career
Years	Team	Apps	(Points)
1964-68	Scotland	22	(68)
1966	British and Irish Lions	5	(30)

Stewart Wilson (born 22 October 1942) is a former Scotland international rugby union player. He played as a fullback.

He had 22 caps for Scotland between 1964 and 1968, and captained his country in four international matches. He scored 68 points in internationals for Scotland.

He was selected for the 1966 British Lions tour to Australia and New Zealand, and played in the second international against Australia and all four tests against the All Blacks, scoring 30 points which was a Lions career record for test match points at the time.

He represented Oxford in the Varsity Match in 1963 and 1964 and played club rugby for London Scottish.
