= Guy Boniface =

French rugby union player (1937–1968)

- Born: Guy Boniface; 6 March 1937 Montfort-en-Chalosse, France
- Died: 1 January 1968 (aged 30) Saint-Sever, France
- Height: 1.72 m (5 ft 8 in)
- Weight: 72 kg (159 lb)
- Notable relative: André Boniface (brother)

Rugby union career
- Position: Centre
Amateur team(s)
| Years | Team | Apps | (Points) |
- U.S. Montfortoise
| – | Mont-de-Marsan | | |
International career
| Years | Team | Apps | (Points) |
| 1960–1966 | France | 35 | (45) |

Guy Boniface (6 March 1937 – 1 January 1968) was a French rugby union footballer that represented France in 35 Tests.

Born in Montfort-en-Chalosse, Aquitaine, he mainly played at centre, and played for Stade Montois and U.S. Montfortoise. He won the French Championship with Stade Montois in 1963, and was runner up with them in 1959. He also won the Challenge Yves du Manoir in 1960, 1961, and 1962. Stade Montois' stadium was named after him following his death.

He played 18 Tests with his brother André Boniface including one Test against New Zealand (the All Blacks) in which the All Blacks had two sets of brothers playing. He helped France with the Five Nations in 1959 - their first outright Championship victory. In 1968 - whilst returning home from a club match - he was killed in a traffic accident.

Both brothers were inducted together into the IRB Hall of Fame in March 2011.
