= Paddy McGrath (rugby union) =

Irish rugby union player

- Full name: Patrick John McGrath
- Born: 20 August 1941 (age 85) Burma
- School: Rockwell College
- University: University College Cork

Rugby union career
- Position: Wing
Provincial / State sides
Years	Team	Apps	(Points)
-	University College Cork	-	(-)
-	Munster	-	(-)
1969	Waikato	10	(15)
International career
Years	Team	Apps	(Points)
1965–67	Ireland	10	(12)

Patrick John McGrath (born 20 August 1941) is an Irish former rugby union international.

Born in Burma, McGrath attended Rockwell College and was a good schoolboy athlete, winning All-Ireland junior titles in the 100 metres hurdles and pole vault.

Most suited to the wing, he played his rugby for Munster and University College Cork, where he studied medicine.

He was capped 10 times for Ireland (#709) between 1965 and 1967, scoring four tries.

At Musgrave Park, McGrath was part of the 1967 Munster team that beat Australia 11-8 in front of 10,000 spectators.

In 1969, McGrath also appeared in 10 matches for Waikato Rugby (#638) in New Zealand provincial rugby, scoring five tries (15 points). He represented the Hamilton Marist club.

In 2023, McGrath was named at number 11 in the University College Cork Rugby Team of 150 years.

Now based in Canada.

== See also ==
- List of Ireland national rugby union players
