= Jo Maso =

France international rugby union & league player

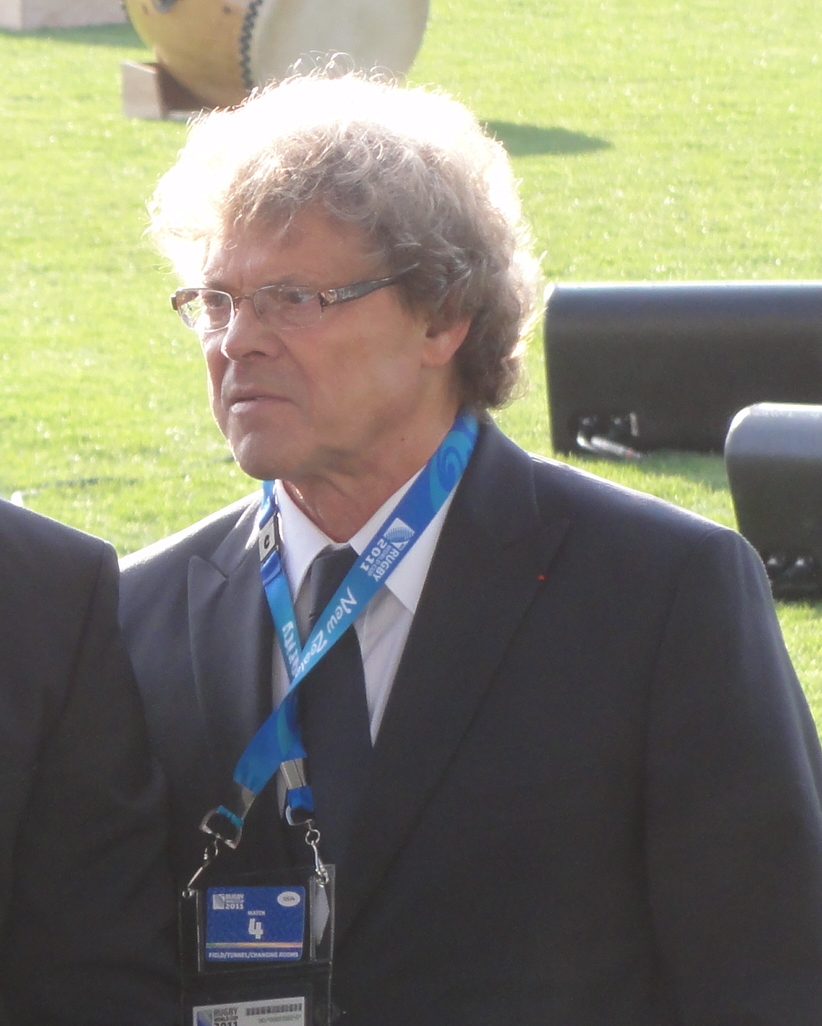
- Jo Maso in 2011

Personal information
- Born: Joseph Maso; 27 December 1944 (age 81) Toulouse, France
- Height: 1.80 m (5 ft 11 in)
- Weight: 80 kg (12 st 8 lb)

Playing information
- Position: Stand-off
Club
Years	Team	Pld	T	G	FG	P
	XIII Catalan

Rugby union career
- Position: Centre
Senior career
Years	Team	Apps	(Points)
- USA Perpignan
- RC Toulonnais
1968–1977	RC Narbonne		
1977–1983	USA Perpignan		
- Correct as of 5 March 2007
International career
Years	Team	Apps	(Points)
1966–1973	France	25	(15)
- Correct as of 5 March 2007

Jo Maso (born 27 December 1944) is a French former rugby league and rugby union footballer who played in the 1960s, 1970s and 1980s. He played centre and fly-half for the France national rugby union team, gaining 25 caps. He was inducted into the International Rugby Hall of Fame in 2003. He is now the manager for the France national team.

Maso was born in Toulouse, France. Maso started his rugby career as a professional rugby league footballer for XIII Catalan, being the son of the French rugby league internationalist Jep Maso. However, he switched to union. He played club rugby for Narbonne, Toulonnais and Perpignan. He debuted for France against Italy in Naples in 1966. He also toured Australia, New Zealand and South Africa with the national side, and played three times for the Barbarians.
