= Alexandru Penciu =

Romanian rugby union footballer and coach (1932–2023)

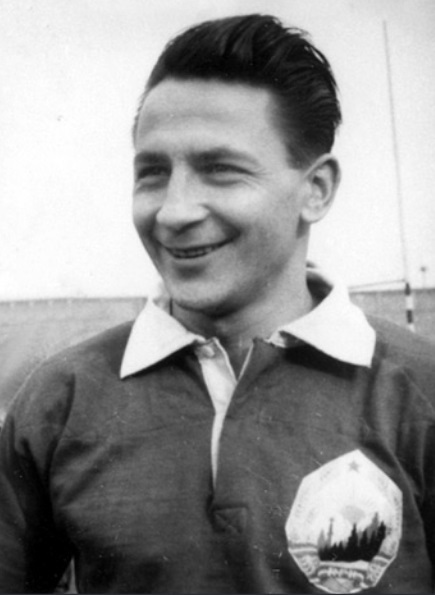
- Penciu while at the Romania national team
- Born: 1 November 1932 Bucharest, Romania
- Died: 11 August 2023 (aged 90) Feltre, Italy
- Height: 1.72 m (5 ft 7 1/2 in)

Rugby union career
- Position(s): Fullback, Centre
Youth career
- 1947: Petrolul București
- 1947–1950: Locomotiva PTT
Senior career
Years	Team	Apps	(Points)
1950–1952	Locomotiva PTT		
1952–1968	Steaua București		
1969–1973	Rovigo		
International career
Years	Team	Apps	(Points)
1955–1967	Romania	34	(37)
Coaching career
- Years: Team
- 1969–1973: Rovigo (player-coach)
- 1973–1974: Steaua București (youth)
- 1974–1976: Rovigo (youth)
- 1976–1977: Montréal
- 1977–1978: Oyonnax
- 1978–1980: Mantova
- 1980–1981: Villadose
- 1981–1983: Belluno

Alexandru Penciu (1 November 1932 – 11 August 2023) was a Romanian rugby union player and coach, who played as a fullback or centre. He was considered one of the best players of his era and was nicknamed "Alexander the Great" (Alexandru cel Mare) in his home country.

== Club career ==
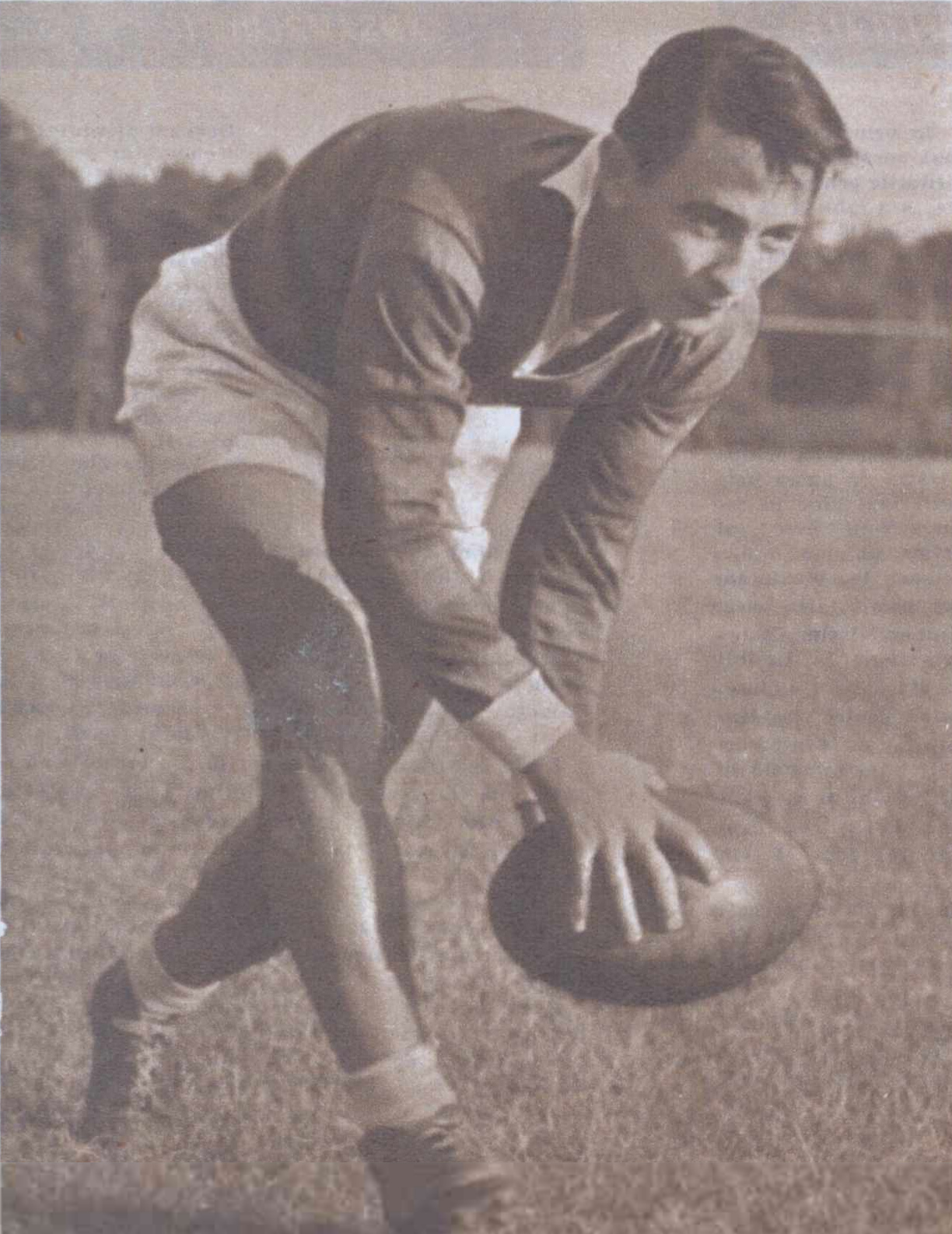
Alexandru Penciu

Penciu started his rugby career after the Second World War with Petrolul București as a youth in 1947. That same year, he moved to Locomotiva PPT, where he played from 1947 to 1952 and was promoted to the first team in 1950. He joined CCA, later called CSA Steaua in 1952, where he played until 1968. He helped the club win five First Division titles and four Romanian Cups.

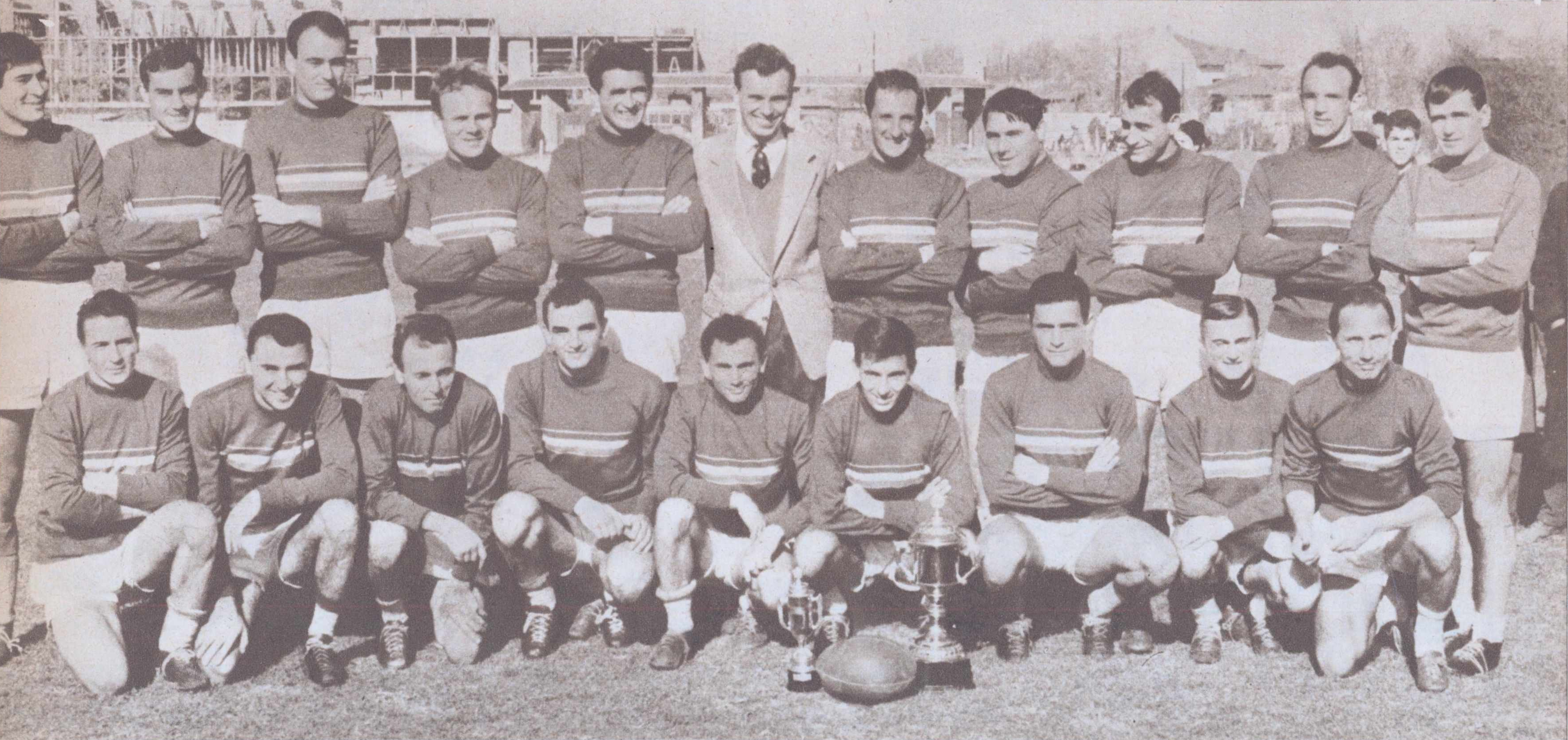
Penciu (bottom row, first from left) with Romanian champions Steaua in 1963.

In 1969, Penciu was allowed by the communist authorities to play abroad in Italy. Penciu was a player-coach for Italian side Rovigo. He scored the most points in the Serie A league in 1970-1971 (104 points) and 1971-1972 (124 points).

Penciu retired as a player, in 1973, at the age of 40.

== International career ==
Penciu won 34 caps for Romania from 1955 to 1967, scoring 2 conversions, 7 penalties and 4 drop goals, 37 points in aggregate. He debuted on 20 April 1955 in Brno, in a 3–0 win over Czechoslovakia.

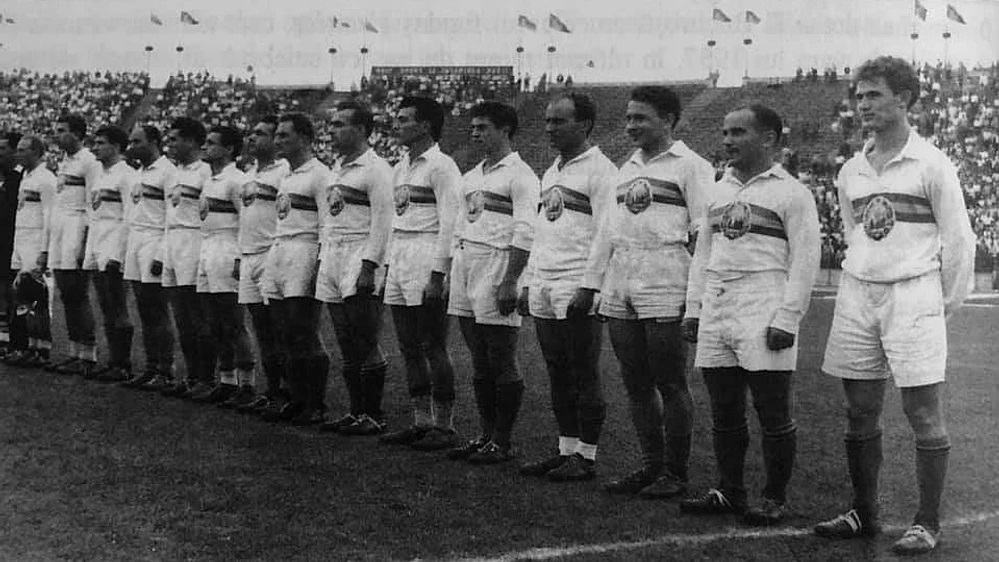
Romania's starting lineup in the match against France, which Romania won 11–5. Penciu (third from right) June 1960

In June 1960, he played in Romania's first-ever win over France, 11–5, where he scored 1 conversion and 2 drop goals. Romania was then experiencing its first "Golden Era" of rugby and was often considered the best European team outside the Five Nations Championship.

His last international game was on 10 December 1967 in Nantes, in the 11–3 defeat against France in the FIRA Nations Cup, where he scored a penalty. It was Romania's second consecutive runner-up finish in the competition, having lost the title to France twice in a row, and France was the only continental European team in the Five Nations Championship at the time.

== Coaching career ==
After retiring as a player, he coached several clubs in Italy, France and Canada.

== Death ==
Penciu died on 11 August 2023, at the age of 90.

== Honours ==
=== Club ===
Steaua Bucharest

- Romanian League (5): 1953, 1954, 1961, 1963, 1964
- Romanian Cup (4): 1953, 1955, 1956, 1958

=== International ===
Romania

- FIRA Nations Cup runner-up: 1967

== See also ==
- List of Romania national rugby union players
