= André Boniface =

France international rugby union player (1934–2024)

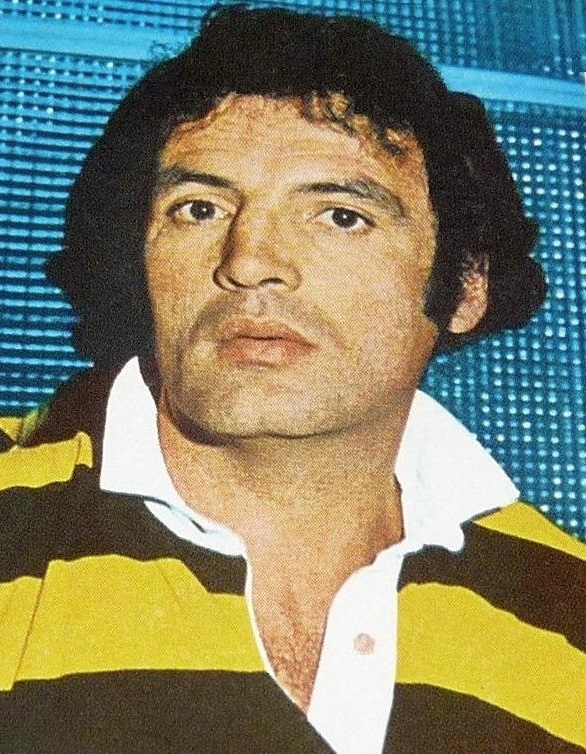
- Boniface in 1971
- Born: André Boniface; 14 August 1934 Montfort-en-Chalosse, France
- Died: 8 April 2024 (aged 89) Bayonne, France
- Height: 1.79 m (5 ft 10 in)
- Weight: 82 kg (181 lb)
- Notable relative: Guy Boniface (brother)

Rugby union career
- Position: Centre or wing
Amateur team(s)
| Years | Team | Apps | (Points) |
| 1951–1952 | Dax | | |
| 1952–1972 | Mont-de-Marsan | | |
International career
| Years | Team | Apps | (Points) |
| 1954–1966 | France | 48 | (44) |

André Boniface (14 August 1934 – 8 April 2024) was an international rugby union player for France. His usual position was either on the wing or in the centres. His Test career for France, 1954 through to 1966, included 48 caps and 44 points.

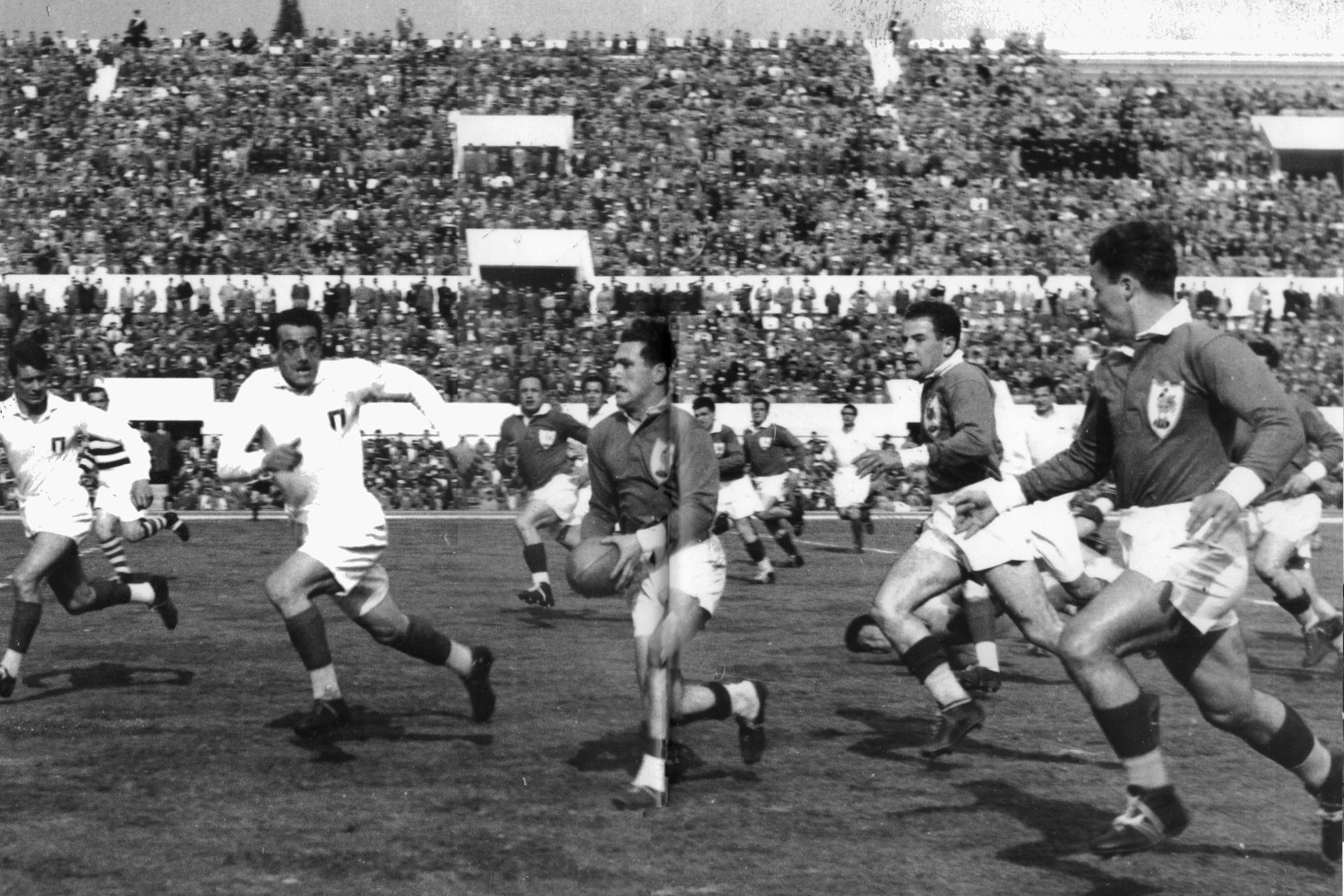
The 1954 FIRA European Cup final between France and Italy was André Boniface’s fifth official international match

Boniface was inducted into the International Rugby Hall of Fame in 2005. Both he and his younger brother Guy Boniface were inducted into the IRB Hall of Fame in March 2011. Boniface died on 8 April 2024, at the age of 89.

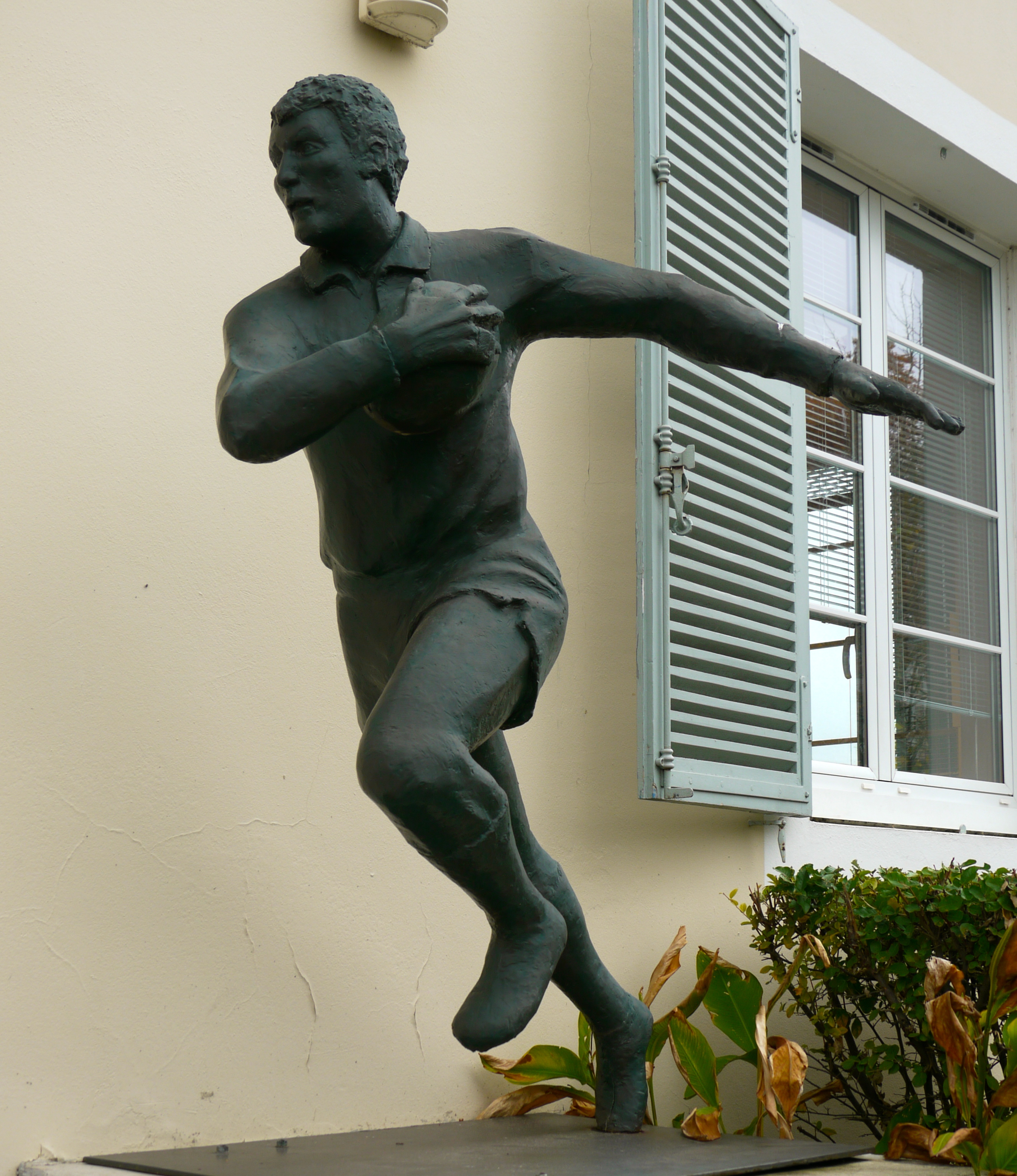
A statue of André Boniface in Mont-de-Marsan
