= Valeriu Irimescu =

Romanian rugby union player and coach (1940–2026)

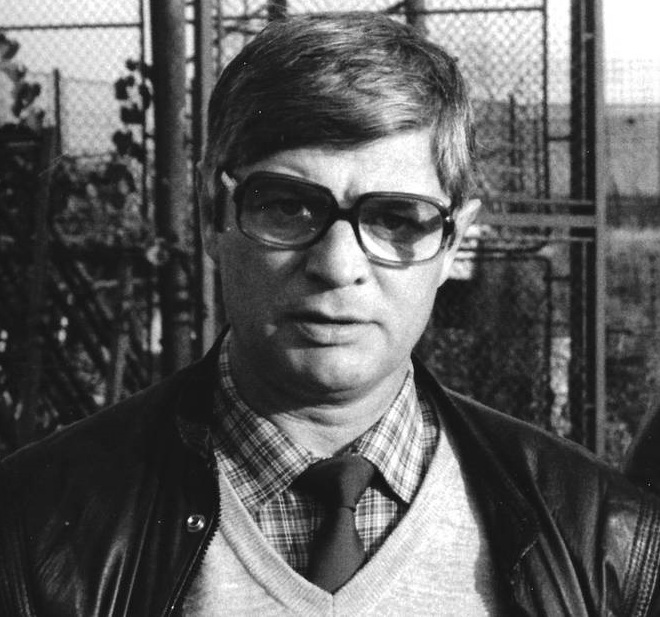
- Born: 3 November 1940 Bucharest, Romania
- Died: 10 March 2026 (aged 85)
- Height: 1.70 m (5 ft 7 in)

Rugby union career
- Position(s): Centre, fly-half, full-back
Youth career
- 1950–1958: Grivița București
Senior career
Years	Team	Apps	(Points)
1958–1970	Grivița București		
1970–1971	Paris Université Club		
1971–1972	Angoulême		
International career
Years	Team	Apps	(Points)
1960–1971	Romania	32	(65)
Coaching career
- Years: Team
- 1973–1986: Romania
- 1986–1988: Politehnica Iași
- Stade Olympique Millavois
- AS Eymet
- Toulouse AC
- US Métro

Valeriu Irimescu (3 November 1940 – 10 March 2026) was a Romanian rugby union player and coach.

== Playing career ==
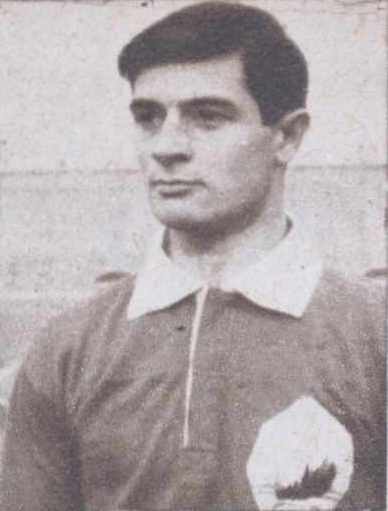
Irimescu with Romania's national team in 1963

Irimescu began playing rugby at a young age in Bucharest, joining the junior ranks of Grivița Roșie. His senior club career was largely spent with Grivița Roșie, one of Romania's dominant teams of the era, with which he won multiple national championships and the FIRA European Champions Cup in 1964.

A versatile back, Irimescu played as a fly-half at club level and occasionally as a fullback, while also representing Romania as a centre. He later had spells abroad in France with clubs such as Paris UC and SC Angoulême.

Irimescu made his debut for the Romania national team in 1960 and went on to earn 32 caps, scoring 65 points. He was a key leader during Romania's "golden generation", occasionally captaining the side and contributing to notable victories against leading European opponents. He was best remembered for his performance in Romania's historic 15–14 victory over France at Bucharest in 1968, scoring all of his team's points, which earned him international recognition.

== Coaching career ==
After retiring from playing, Irimescu transitioned into coaching, becoming one of the most influential figures in Romanian rugby. He served as head coach of the Romania national team from 1973 to 1986, overseeing a period of sustained success in European competitions.

Under his leadership, Romania won several editions of the FIRA Trophy (European Nations Cup), including titles in 1975, 1977, 1981 and 1983. His tenure helped consolidate Romania’s reputation as one of the strongest rugby nations outside the Five Nations. In addition to his national team role, he coached at club level both in Romania and abroad, including spells in France with teams such as AS Eymet, Toulouse AC and US Métro. He also contributed to the development of Romanian rugby as a federal coach and mentor for future generations.

== Death ==
Irimescu died on 10 March 2026, at the age of 85.

== Honours ==
=== Player ===
Grivița București

- Liga Națională (6): 1959, 1960, 1962, 1966, 1967, 1970
- FIRA European Champions Cup: 1964

Romania

- FIRA Nations Cup: 1968–69

=== Federal coach ===
Romania

- FIRA Trophy (4): 1974–75, 1976–77, 1980–81, 1982–83
