= Arnaldo Gruarin =

France international rugby union player (1938–2025)

- Born: 5 February 1938 Gruaro, Italy
- Died: 28 January 2025 (aged 86)
- Height: 1.80 m (5 ft 11 in)
- Weight: 103 kg (227 lb)

Rugby union career
- Position: Prop
Senior career
Years	Team	Apps	(Points)
1962–1974	Toulon		
International career
Years	Team	Apps	(Points)
1964–1968	France	26	(6)

Arnaldo Gruarin (5 February 1938 – 28 January 2025) was a French international rugby union player.

== Biography ==
Known as "Aldo", Gruarin was an Italian by birth and spent his early years in a town near Venice. He picked up rugby after moving to Toulouse with his family after World War II and played for local team RC Toulon.

Gruarin was capped 26 times for France between 1964 and 1968. He was a member of the French team which achieved the 1968 Five Nations grand slam, with appearances against Scotland and Ireland.

Gruarin died on 28 January 2025, at the age of 86.

== See also ==
- List of France national rugby union players
