= Claude Lacaze =

French rugby union player (1940–2026)

- Born: 5 March 1940 Pontacq, Pyrénées-Atlantiques, Nouvelle-Aquitaine, France
- Died: 28 February 2026 (aged 85) Nice, France

Rugby union career
- Position: Fullback
Senior career
Years	Team	Apps	(Points)
- FC Lourdes
- SC Angoulême
- Racing Club de Nice
International career
Years	Team	Apps	(Points)
1961–1969	France	33	(59)
- Correct as of 19 January 2021
- Relatives: Pierre Lacaze (brother)

Claude Lacaze (5 March 1940 – 28 February 2026) was a French rugby union player. He played rugby union as a fullback.

== Club career ==
Lacaze played for FC Lourdes (1960–61 – 1961–62), SC Angoulême (1962–63 – 1971–72) and Racing Club de Nice (1972–73 – 1976–77).

== International career ==
Lacaze had 33 caps for France, from 1961 to 1969, scoring 1 try, 13 conversions, 5 penalties and 5 drop goals, 59 points on aggregate.

He played in the Five Nations Championship at four competitions, being a winner three times, in 1962, 1967 and 1968, this time with the first Grand Slam won by the French. He also participated in 1963, 1964 and 1966. He was the top points scorer at the 1966 Five Nations Championship, with 14. He had 16 caps, scoring 1 try, 5 conversions, 2 penalties and 2 drop goals, 25 point on aggregate, during his presence at the competition.

== Death ==
Lacaze died on 28 February 2026, at the age of 85.
