= Jean-Michel Cabanier =

France international rugby union player

- Born: 13 May 1936 Tarn-et-Garonne, France
- Died: 25 April 2010 (aged 73) Montauban, France
- Height: 5 ft 10 in (178 cm)
- Weight: 209 lb (95 kg)

Rugby union career
- Position: Hooker
International career
Years	Team	Apps	(Points)
1963–68	France	26	(12)

Jean-Michel Cabanier (13 May 1936 — 25 April 2010) was a French rugby union international.

Raised in Tarn-et-Garonne, Cabanier played originally for Castelsarrasinois but spent most of his career with US Montauban, where he won a Brennus Shield in the 1966–67 season.

Cabanier, hooker in a strong France national team during the 1960s, earned a total of 26 caps, forming a front-row with Arnaldo Gruarin and Jean-Claude Berejnoï that was considered the world's best. He was the Oscar du Midi runner-up in 1967 and made two appearances for France in their grand slam-winning 1968 Five Nations campaign.

== See also ==
- List of France national rugby union players
