= Jean-Claude Berejnoï =

French rugby union player (1939–2024)

- Born: 20 April 1939 Decazeville, France
- Died: September 2024 (aged 85)

Rugby union career
- Position: Prop
Senior career
Years	Team	Apps	(Points)
- SC Decazeville
- SC Tulle
International career
Years	Team	Apps	(Points)
1963–1967	France	27	(0)

Jean-Claude Berejnoï (20 April 1939 – September 2024) was a French rugby union player who played as a prop.

== Biography ==
Born in Decazeville on 20 April 1939, Berejnoï began playing professionally for his hometown team, SC Decazeville before moving to SC Tulle in 1957. He played his first match for the French national team on 15 December 1963 against Romania. His final match, which took place on 10 December 1967, also took place against Romania. Following his rugby career, he worked as an insurance agent in Decazeville and Maurs.

Jean-Claude Berejnoï died in September 2024, at the age of 85.
