= André Herrero =

French rugby union player (1938–2025)

- Born: 28 January 1938 Puisserguier, France
- Died: October 2025 (aged 87) Toulon, France
- Height: 1.88 m (6 ft 2 in)
- Weight: 96 kg (212 lb)

Rugby union career
- Position: Number 8
Senior career
Years	Team	Apps	(Points)
1957–1971	Toulon		
1971–1978	RRC Nice		
International career
Years	Team	Apps	(Points)
1963–1967	France	22	(6)
Coaching career
- Years: Team
- 1981–1983: Toulon

André Herrero (28 January 1938 – October 2025) was a French rugby union player. He played for the national team as a flanker. Herrero was of Spanish descent.

== Career ==
=== Club ===
- Toulon. He reached the French championship finals in 1968 and 1971 and won the Challenge Yves du Manoir in 1970.
- RRC Nice

=== National squad ===
- He played his first game with the French team on December 15, 1963, against Romania, and his last in 1967 against Romania.
- He had 22 caps for France between 1963 and 1967.
- Five Nations championship: he won the 1967 edition.

== Death ==
Herrero died in October 2025, at the age of 87. His death was announced by his former club, RC Toulon.
