= Benoît Dauga =

French rugby union player (1942–2022)

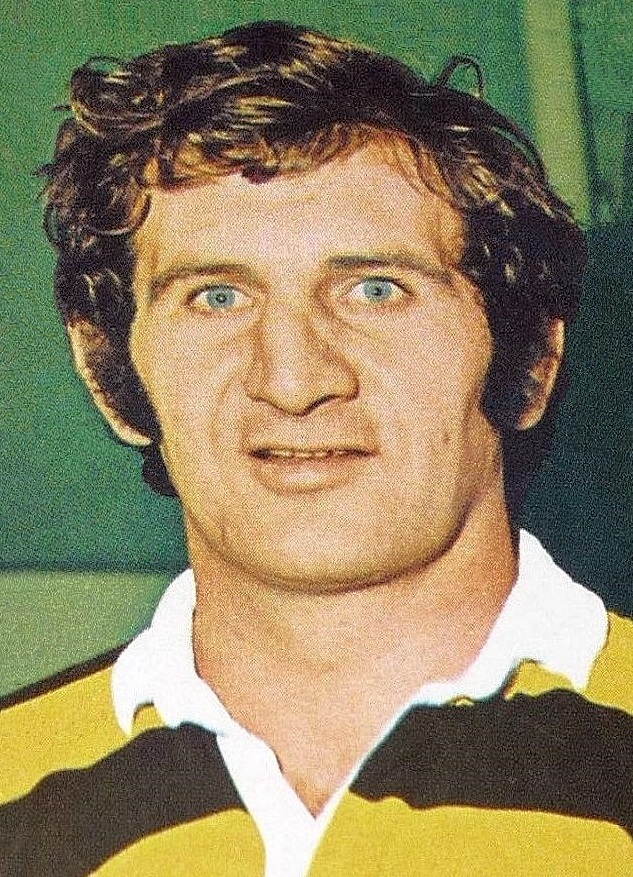
- Born: 8 May 1942 Montgaillard, Landes, France
- Died: 3 November 2022 (aged 80)
- Height: 1.96 m (6 ft 5 in)
- Weight: 100 kg (15 st 10 lb)

Rugby union career
- Position(s): Lock, number eight
Senior career
Years	Team	Apps	(Points)
19??-19??	Stade Montois		
International career
Years	Team	Apps	(Points)
1964-1972	France	63	(34)

Benoît Dauga (8 May 1942 – 3 November 2022) was a French rugby union footballer. He played as a lock and as number eight.

Dauga played for Stade Montois. He had 63 caps for the France national team, from 1964 to 1972, scoring 11 tries, 34 points on aggregate. He captained France on nine occasions. He was a part of the French team that won a Grand Slam in the Five Nations in 1968, as well as the championship wins in 1967 and 1970.

== Honors and awards ==
Chevalier of the Order of Legion of Honour
