= Jean-Joseph Rupert =

France international rugby union player

- Born: 7 March 1938 Saint-Jean-de-Marsacq, France
- Died: 8 February 2013 (aged 74)
- Height: 6 ft 2 in (188 cm)
- Weight: 185 lb (84 kg)

Rugby union career
- Position: Flanker
Senior career
Years	Team	Apps	(Points)
- US Tyrosse
International career
Years	Team	Apps	(Points)
1963–68	France	14	(12)

Jean-Joseph Rupert (7 March 1938 – 8 February 2013) was a French international rugby union player.

A native of Saint-Jean-de-Marsacq, Rupert played for Landes club US Tyrosse all through his career. He was an athletic flanker and gained a total of 14 France caps, after debuting in 1963. His final match, against Scotland at Murrayfield, was the opening fixture of France's grand slam-winning 1968 Five Nations campaign.

== See also ==
- List of France national rugby union players
