= Christian Darrouy =

French rugby union player

Christian Darrouy (born Pouydesseaux, 13 January 1937) is a former French rugby union player. He played as a wing.

He played for Stade Montois, from 1954/55 to 1971/72. He won the French Championship in 1962/63, and was runners-up in 1958/59. He finished his career at US Roquefort.

He had 40 caps for France, from 1957 to 1967, scoring 23 tries, 69 points on aggregate. He participated in seven Five Nations Championship tournaments, in 1957, 1959, 1963, 1964, 1965, 1966 and 1967, and was twice the winner in 1959 and 1967. He had 22 caps at the competition, scoring 13 tries, 39 points on aggregate.
