= 1968 Five Nations Championship squads =

Rugby union competition squads

These are the 1968 Five Nations Championship squads:

== England ==
1. Peter Bell
2. Terence Brooke
3. Mike Coulman
4. John Finlan
5. David Gay
6. Bob Hiller
7. Brian Keen
8. Peter Larter
9. Bob Lloyd
10. Colin McFadyean (c.)
11. Jim Parsons
12. Roger Pickering
13. Derek Prout
14. John Pullin
15. Bill Redwood
16. Keith Savage
17. Rod Webb
18. Bryan West
19. Mike Weston (c.)*

*captain in the last game

== France ==
Head coach: Jean Prat

1. André Abadie
2. Jean-Marie Bonal
3. Jean-Michel Cabanier
4. Guy Camberabero
5. Lilian Camberabero
6. André Campaes
7. Christian Carrère (c.)
8. Élie Cester
9. Benoît Dauga
10. Claude Dourthe
11. Bernard Duprat
12. Jean Gachassin
13. Michel Greffe
14. Arnaldo Gruarin
15. Claude Lacaze
16. Michel Lasserre
17. Jean-Pierre Lux
18. Jo Maso
19. Jean-Henri Mir
20. Jean-Claude Noble
21. Alain Plantefol
22. Jean-Joseph Rupert
23. Jean Salut
24. Walter Spanghero
25. Jean Trillo
26. Pierre Villepreux
27. Michel Yachvili

== Ireland ==
1. Aidan Brady
2. Barry Bresnihan
3. Mick Doyle
4. Thomas Doyle
5. Alan Duggan
6. Mike Gibson
7. Ken Goodall
8. Mike Hipwell
9. Ken Kennedy
10. Tom Kiernan (c.)
11. Willie John McBride
12. Billy McCombe
13. Syd Millar
14. Mick Molloy
15. Brian O'Brien
16. Philo O'Callaghan
17. John Quirke
18. Des Scott
19. Brian Sherry

== Scotland ==
1. Rodger Arneil
2. Alasdair Boyle
3. Sandy Carmichael
4. David Chisholm
5. Gordon Connell
6. Derek Deans
7. Tommy Elliot
8. Pringle Fisher (c.)
9. John Frame
10. Derrick Grant
11. Alex Hastie
12. Sandy Hinshelwood
13. Charlie Hodgson
14. Hamish Keith
15. Frank Laidlaw
16. Ian McCrae
17. Alastair McHarg
18. George Mitchell
19. Ian Robertson
20. David Rollo
21. Peter Stagg
22. Norm Suddon
23. Jim Telfer (c.)*
24. Jock Turner
25. Stewart Wilson

*captain in the last game

== Wales ==
1. Gerald Davies
2. John Dawes (c.)**
3. Gareth Edwards (c.)*
4. Norman Gale (c.)
5. Tony Gray
6. Boyo James
7. Keith Jarrett
8. Barry John
9. Ian Jones
10. Keri Jones
11. Ron Jones
12. John Lloyd
13. Billy Mainwaring
14. Dai Morris
15. John O'Shea
16. Billy Raybould
17. Doug Rees
18. Maurice Richards
19. Delme Thomas
20. Bobby Wanbon
21. Stuart Watkins
22. Paul Wheeler
23. Denzil Williams
24. Max Wiltshire
25. Jeff Young

*captain in the second and fourth games **captain in the third game
