= 1969 Australia rugby union tour of South Africa =

Summary
P	W	D	L
Total
26	15	0	11
Test match
4	0	0	4
Opponent
P	W	D	L
South Africa
4	0	4	0

The 1969 Australia rugby union tour of South Africa was a series played by the Australia national rugby union team between June and September 1969. The "Wallabies" lost the series with Springboks by four tests to nil.

== Squad ==
=== Full-backs ===
- Arthur Neil McGill
- Brian Anthony Weir

=== Wings ===
- Terence Robert Forman
- John Walter Cole
- Peter Douglas Moore
- Roderick Paul Batterham

=== Centres ===
- Stephen Oliver Knight
- Barry David Honan
- Geoffrey Arnold Shaw
- Philip Vivers Smith

=== Fly-halves ===
- John Patrick Ballesty
- Rupert George Rosenblum

=== Scrum-halves ===
- John Noel Brian Hipwell
- Michael Joseph Barry

=== Props ===
- Roydon Barnett Prosser
- James Russel Roxburgh
- John Leslie Howard
- Shane Stephen Sullivan

=== Hookers ===
- Paul Darveniza
- Bruce Stanton Taafe

=== Locks ===
- Owen Frederick Butler
- Stuart Carlton Gregory
- Peter Norman Reilly
- Anthony Morris Abrahams
- Alan James Skinner

=== Loose forwards ===
- Gregory Victor Davis (captain)
- Hugh Alexander Rose
- Roderick Kelleher
- Barry Stuart McDonald
- Michael Richard Cocks
- Robert Neil Wood

== Management ==
- Charles Colbran Eastes (Manager)
- Desmond Michael Connor (Assistant Manager)

== Squad leadership ==
The Wallaby squad was captained by Greg Davis described by Howell as "a leader of men who believed a leader should lead....a single minded flanker who gave no quarter and asked for none". Davis was making his fifth overseas tour with the Wallabies but his first as captain.The former Wallaby and All Black Des Connor was the coach with the traditional title of "Assistant Manager".

== Matches ==
Scores and results list Australia's points tally first.

Opposing Team	For	Against	Date	Venue	Status
Eastern Transvaal	27	13	28 June 1969	PAM Brink Stadium, Springs	Tour Match
Orange Free State County Districts	47	9	2 July 1969	North West Stadium, Welkom	Tour Match
Griqualand West	13	21	5 July 1969	De Beers Stadium, Kimberley	Tour Match
Rhodesia	16	11	8 July 1969	Hartsfield, Bulawayo	Tour Match
Natal	14	19	12 July 1969	Kings Park Stadium, Durban	Tour Match
SA County Districts	13	12	14 July 1969	Boland Stadium, Wellington	Tour Match
South Western Districts	31	23	16 July 1969	Recreation Ground, Oudtshoorn	Tour Match
Eastern Province	17	0	19 July 1969	Boet Erasmus Stadium, Port Elizabeth	Tour Match
Border	22	9	23 July 1969	B.R.U. Ground, East London	Tour Match
South African Gazelles	27	17	26 July 1969	PAM Brink Stadium, Springs	Tour Match
Far Northern Transvaal	26	0	29 July 1969	Pietersburg High School, Pietersburg	Tour Match
South Africa	11	30	2 August 1969	Ellis Park Stadium, Johannesburg	Test Match
Boland	3	12	6 August 1969	Boland Stadium, Wellington	Tour Match
Western Province	14	8	9 August 1969	Newlands Stadium, Cape Town	Tour Match
Central Universities	26	11	12 August 1969	Boet Erasmus Stadium, Port Elizabeth	Tour Match
South Africa	9	16	16 August 1969	Kings Park Stadium, Durban	Test Match
North Eastern Cape	12	11	20 August 1969	Botanical Gardens, Graaf-Reinet	Tour Match
Orange Free State	25	14	23 August 1969	Free State Stadium, Bloemfontein	Tour Match
Western Transvaal	6	18	27 August 1969	Olen Park, Potchefstroom	Tour Match
Northern Transvaal	3	13	30 August 1969	Loftus Versfeld Stadium, Pretoria	Tour Match
South West Africa	38	8	1 September 1969	South West Stadium, Windhoek	Tour Match
South Africa	3	11	6 September 1969	Newlands Stadium, Cape Town	Test Match
North Western Cape	37	6	10 September 1969	Danie Kuys Stadium, Upington	Tour Match
Transvaal	14	23	13 September 1969	Ellis Park Stadium, Johannesburg	Tour Match
Combined Services	3	19	16 September 1969	Loftus Versfeld Stadium, Pretoria	Tour Match
South Africa	8	19	20 September 1969	Free State Stadium, Bloemfontein	Test Match
