= 1968–69 Scottish Inter-District Championship =

Rugby union competition

- Countries: Scotland
- Date: 1968–69
- Champions: South
- Runners-up: Edinburgh District
- Matches played: 6

The 1968–69 Scottish Inter-District Championship was a rugby union competition for Scotland's district teams.

This season saw the 16th Scottish Inter-District Championship.

South won the competition with 3 wins.

== 1968-69 League Table ==
Team	P	W	D	L	PF	PA	+/-	Pts
South	3	3	0	0	49	27	+22	6
Edinburgh District	3	1	1	1	42	54	-12	3
Glasgow District	3	1	0	2	48	46	+2	2
North and Midlands	3	0	1	2	27	39	-12	1

== Results ==
Date	Try	Conversion	Penalty	Dropped goal	Goal from mark	Notes
1948–1970	3 points	2 points	3 points	3 points	3 points	

=== Round 1 ===
15 October 1968

South	14 – 10	Glasgow District
	Preview; Report

Poynder Park, Kelso
Referee: E. N. Sheret (Howe of Fife)

South:
Glasgow District:

=== Round 2 ===
9 November 1968

South	16 – 14	North and Midlands
	Preview; Report

Philiphaugh, Selkirk
Referee: E. M. Lewis (Abeetillery)

South:
North and Midlands:

=== Round 3 ===
23 November 1968

North and Midlands	10 – 10	Edinburgh District
	Preview; Report

Bught Park, Inverness
Referee: J. G. R. Howie (Glasgow HSFP)

North and Midlands:
Edinburgh District:

=== Round 4 ===
7 December 1968

Glasgow District	25 – 29	Edinburgh District
	Preview; Report

Hughenden Stadium
Referee: T. P. E. Grierson (Hawick)

Glasgow District:
Edinburgh District:

=== Round 5 ===
18 January 1969

South	19 – 3	Edinburgh District
	Preview; Report

Greenyards, Melrose
Referee: K. Clarke (Ulster)

South:
Edinburgh District:

=== Round 6 ===
8 February 1969

Glasgow District	13 – 3	North and Midlands
	Preview; Report

Murrayfield Stadium
Referee: R. F. Johnson (Kent)

Glasgow District:
North and Midlands:

== Matches outwith the Championship ==
=== Other Scottish matches ===
5 November 1968

Glasgow District	–	Anglo-Scots
	Preview

Glasgow Districts:
Anglo-Scots:

=== Trial matches ===
26 October 1968

Blues Trial	26 – 5	Whites Trial
	Report

Murrayfield Stadium
Referee: D. J. C. McMahon (Heriots)

Blues Trial:
Whites Trial:

28 December 1968

Scotland Probables	–	Scotland Possibles

Murrayfield Stadium

Scotland Probables:
Scotland Possibles:

=== International matches ===
30 October 1968

Combined Scottish Districts	9 – 14	Australia
Pen: Penman x 3	Report	Try: Terry Forman x 2 John Cole; Peter Reilly; Con: Terry Forman

Hughenden Stadium
Referee: R. Calmet (France)

Combined Scottish Districts: H. H. Penman (Royal HSFP), W. Mitchellhill (Melrose), A. V. Orr (Royal HSFP), John Frame (Gala), I. Davidson (Langholm), B. Laidlaw (Royal HSFP), Dick Allan (Hutchesons GSFP), David Rollo (Howe of Fife) [captain], Derek Deans (Hawick), P. C. Robertson (Hawick), J. S. Wilkinson (Gala), Peter Brown (Gala), Ken Oliver (Gala), L. L. Monaghan (Glasgow Academicals), M. C. Barrie (Watsonians)
Australia: Barry Honan, John Cole, John Brass, Alex Pope, Terry Forman, John Ballesty, Mick Barry, Keith Bell, Peter Johnson [captain], Paul Darveniza, Peter Reilly, Stuart Gregory, Hugh Rose, Alan Skinner, David Taylor
