= Paul Darveniza =

Australia international rugby union player and neurologist (1945–2024)

- Born: Paul Darveniza; 19 September 1945 Brisbane, Queensland
- Died: 11 June 2024 Sydney, New South Wales
- School: Cranbrook School, Sydney
- University: University of Sydney
- Occupation: Consultant neurologist

Rugby union career
- Position: Hooker
International career
Years	Team	Apps	(Points)
1969	Wallabies	4	(0)

Paul Darveniza (19 September 1945 – 11 June 2024) was an Australian rugby union player who played as a hooker. He played four tests for the Wallabies in 1968–1969. During the 1971 South Africa rugby union tour of Australia he was one of seven Wallabies players (the "Anti-Apartheid Seven") who refused to play the whites-only South African Springboks team and voiced their opposition to the continuation of sporting ties with apartheid-based South Africa. After his sporting career Darveniza served as a consultant neurologist at St Vincents Hospital, Darlinghurst for more than 50 years.

== Early life and education ==
Darveniza was born on 19 September 1945 in Brisbane, Queensland. His father, Zvonomir, was a dentist of Croatian descent. Following the separation of his parents, Paul Darveniza lived with his mother, Audrey Wella Darveniza-Barns, and periodically visited his father who was then practising in outback Queensland.

Moving with his mother to Sydney, Darveniza attended the Cranbook School, where he excelled in cricket and rugby. He then studied medicine at the University of Sydney and gained a residency in neurology at St Vincents Hospital, Darlinghurst, the place where he would later practise for most of his medical career.

== Rugby union career ==
Darveniza was a "a tough, robust and durable hooker". After leaving school, he played rugby for the Eastern Suburbs District RUFC but in 1965 he transferred for the Sydney University Football Club ("University") team, for which he "played over 100 first-grade games for University, including the premiership-winning finals in 1968 and 1970".

He played rugby union for New South Wales from 1967 until 1969. In 1969 he was selected for the Australia national team. After playing Wales at the Sydney Cricket Ground, he joined the Australian Tour to South Africa, during which he played three more tests. During that tour, which lasted three months, he saw the effects of the "ruthless" apartheid system "both in everyday life in South Africa and within the rugby stadiums themselves". He and six other Wallabies – Jim Boyce, Tony Abrahams, Terry Forman, Barry McDonald, James Roxburgh and Bruce Taafe – declared "their opposition to the continuation of sporting ties with the South African Republic". Dubbed the "Rugby Seven" and the "Anti-Apartheid Seven", their non-violent action was an "unprecedented stance in refusing to play against the Springboks". The seven of them were involved "in the 1971 campaign to 'Halt the Tours' – the South African cricket and rugby visits slated for later in that year."

== Medical career ==
In 1975–1979 Darveniza undertook neurological studies at Queen Square Hospital (now: National Hospital for Neurology and Neurosurgery), in Queen Square, London, graduating with an MD degree, the doctorate being awarded for his investigations and first isolation of monoclonal antibody receptors. He followed that with post-doctoral research under Marshall Warren Nirenberg at the National Institute of Health in Bethesda, Maryland on the outskirts of Washington DC.

Returning to St Vincent's Hospital he was appointed a consultant neurologist whose specialties included "clinical neurology, muscle diseases, myaesthenia gravis, and movement disorders". He was also a senior lecturer in medicine at the University of New South Wales and an associate professor at the University of Notre Dame Australia.

During the 1970s he worked for the Aboriginal Medical Service in the inner city suburb of Redfern in Sydney.

== Honours and memberships ==
- 1976–1978: Muscular Dystrophy Research Fellowship
- 1979: Annual research prize at Queen Square Hospital for his doctorate work
- 1979–1981: International Fogarty Fellowship
- Member, Australasian Association of Neurologists
- 1979: Fellow, Royal Australasian College of Physicians
- 2001: Certificate of Appreciation, jointly signed by the South African High Commissioner Zolile Magugu and the co-convenors of the Anti-Apartheid Movement, Meredith Burgmann and Peter McGregor, was awarded to Darveniza and to each of the other six "Anti-Apartheid Wallabies" for their "personal sacrifice and outstanding contribution to the struggle for racial equality and democratic freedom in South Africa"
- President Nelson Mandela awarded Darveniza and his fellow members of the "Anti-Apartheid Seven" the South African medal named the Medal of Freedom.

== Personal life ==
Darveniza married Alison McCusker (now Gilbert), a nurse, in 1972 and they had three children, Lisa, Ella and Samuel. That marriage ended in 1982. He later married Dr Anne Charteris, a medical doctor, and they had two children, Matthew and Madeleine ("Maddy"). In recent years they lived in Centennial Park and then Rose Bay.

He died of blood cancer in St Vincent's on 11 June 2024. He was survived by his first and second wives, his five children, and his six grandchildren.
