= 1967 Australia rugby union tour of New Zealand =

- Date: 19 August 1967
- Coach: Bryan Palmer
- Tour captain: Ken Catchpole
Summary
P	W	D	L
Total
1	0	0	1
Test match
1	0	0	1
Opponent
P	W	D	L
New Zealand
1	0	0	1

Tour chronology
- ← Great Britain, Ireland and France 1966–67 Great Britain and Ireland 1968 →

The 1967 Australia rugby union tour of New Zealand was the sixteenth Australian tour of New Zealand and the first since 1964 (or 2 years, 355 days). It was succeeded by the 1972 tour of New Zealand and Fiji, exactly five years later. Unlike both teams' usual arrangement of playing a two- or three-match series, the 1967 tour was a one-off match, the first since Australia's 1931 tour and would not be repeated until New Zealand's 1979 tour of Australia.

Despite the significant margin going the way of New Zealand, the half-time scoreline was 9–3 in New Zealand's favour with New Zealand scoring two penalty goals and one drop goal. Australia had one try (unconverted) via Rod Batterham.

== Fixtures ==
Date	Venue	Home	Score	Away
19 August 1967	Athletic Park, Wellington	New Zealand	29–9	Australia

== Match details ==
19 August 1967
NZST (UTC+12)

New Zealand	29–9	Australia
Try: B. Davis; Steel (2); Tremain; Con: Williment (4); Pen: Williment (2); Drop: Herewini	Report	Try: Batterham (2); Pen: Batterham

Athletic Park, Wellington
Attendance: 45,000
Referee: John Pring (New Zealand)

FB	15	Mick Williment
RW	14	Malcolm Dick
OC	13	Bill Davis
IC	12	Ian MacRae
LW	11	Tony Steel
FH	10	Mack Herewini
SH	9	Sid Going
N8	8	Brian Lochore (c)
OF	7	Kel Tremain
BF	6	Waka Nathan
RL	5	Colin Meads
LL	4	Sam Strahan
TP	3	Jack Hazlett
HK	2	John Major
LP	1	Brian Muller
Coach:
Fred Allen

FB	15	Russell Manning
RW	14	Ian Procter
OC	13	Phil Smith
IC	12	John Brass
LW	11	Rod Batterham
FH	10	Phil Hawthorne
SH	9	Ken Catchpole (c)
N8	8	Tony Miller
OF	7	Peter Johnson
BF	6	Roy Prosser
RL	5	Ross Teitzel
LL	4	Tony Abrahams
TP	3	Jeff Sayle
HK	2	Greg Davis
LP	1	Hugh Rose
Coach:
Bryan Palmer
