= Camberabero =

Camberabero is a surname. Notable people with the surname include:

- Didier Camberabero (born 1961), French rugby union player, son of Guy
- Guy Camberabero (1936–2023), French rugby union player
- Lilian Camberabero (1937–2015), French rugby union player, brother of Guy
