= 1967 Five Nations Championship =

International rugby championship

- Date: 14 January - 15 April 1967
- Countries: England; Ireland; France; Scotland; Wales

Tournament statistics
- Champions: France (4th title)
- Matches played: 10
- Tries scored: 28 (2.8 per match)
- Top point scorer: (England) Roger Hosen (33)
- Top try scorer: (England) Colin McFadyean (3)

The 1967 Five Nations Championship was the thirty-eighth series of the rugby union Five Nations Championship. Including the previous incarnations as the Home Nations and Five Nations, this was the seventy-third series of the northern hemisphere rugby union championship. Ten matches were played between 14 January and 15 April. It was contested by England, France, Ireland, Scotland and Wales. France won their fourth title, with a single loss.

== Participants ==
The teams involved were:

| Nation | Venue | City | Head coach | Captain |
|---|---|---|---|---|
| England | Twickenham | London | none | Phil Judd |
| France | Stade Olympique Yves-du-Manoir | Colombes | Jean Prat | Christian Darrouy |
| Ireland | Lansdowne Road | Dublin | none | Noel Murphy |
| Scotland | Murrayfield | Edinburgh | none | Pringle Fisher |
| Wales | National Stadium | Cardiff | none | Alun Pask/David Watkins |

== Table ==
| Pos | Team | Pld | W | D | L | PF | PA | PD | Pts |
|---|---|---|---|---|---|---|---|---|---|
| 1 | France | 4 | 3 | 0 | 1 | 55 | 41 | +14 | 6 |
| 2 | England | 4 | 2 | 0 | 2 | 68 | 67 | +1 | 4 |
| 2 | Ireland | 4 | 2 | 0 | 2 | 17 | 22 | −5 | 4 |
| 2 | Scotland | 4 | 2 | 0 | 2 | 37 | 45 | −8 | 4 |
| 5 | Wales | 4 | 1 | 0 | 3 | 53 | 55 | −2 | 2 |

Source: rugbyfootballhistory.com:

== Results ==
1967-01-14

| France | 8–9 | Scotland |
| Tries: Carrère; Duprat; Con.: Gachassin | | Pen.: Wilson (2); Drops: Simmers |

Stade Olympique Yves-du-Manoir, Colombes
Attendance: 32,000
Referee: K. D. Kelleher (Ireland)

1967-02-04

| Scotland | 11–5 | Wales |
| Tries: Hinshelwood; Telfer; Con.: Wilson; Drops: Chisholm | | Tries: S. Watkins; Con.: Price |

Murrayfield, Edinburgh
Attendance: 70,000
Referee: K. D. Kelleher (Ireland)

1967-02-11

| Ireland | 3–8 | England |
| Pen.: Kiernan | | Tries: McFadyean; Con.: Hosen; Pen.: Hosen |

Lansdowne Road, Dublin
Referee: D. M. Hughes (Wales)

1967-02-25

| England | 12–16 | France |
| Pen.: Hosen (3); Drops: Finlan | | Tries: Dourthe; Duprat; Con.: G. Camberabero (2); Pen.: G. Camberabero; Drops: G. Camberabero |

Twickenham Stadium, London
Attendance: 70,000
Referee: D. P. d'Arcy (Ireland)

1967-02-25

| Scotland | 3–5 | Ireland |
| Pen.: Wilson | | Tries: Murphy; Con.: Kiernan |

Murrayfield, Edinburgh
Referee: D. M. Hughes (Wales)

1967-03-11

| Wales | 0–3 | Ireland |
| | | Tries: Duggan |

National Stadium, Cardiff
Referee: M. H. Titcomb (England)

1967-03-18

| England | 27–14 | Scotland |
| Tries: McFadyean (2); Taylor; Webb; Con.: Hosen (3); Pen.: Hosen (2); Drops: Finlan | | Tries: Hinshelwood; Turner; Con.: Wilson; Pen.: Wilson (2) |

Twickenham Stadium, London
Referee: D. P. d'Arcy (Ireland)

1967-04-01

| France | 20–14 | Wales |
| Tries: G. Camberabero; Dauga; Dourthe; Con.: G. Camberabero; Pen.: G. Camberabero; Drops: G. Camberabero (2) | | Tries: Bebb; Con.: Price; Pen.: Price (2); Drops: D. Watkins |

Stade Olympique Yves-du-Manoir, Colombes
Attendance: 39,367
Referee: D. P. d'Arcy (Ireland)

1967-04-15

| Ireland | 6–11 | France |
| Tries: Molloy; Pen.: Kiernan | | Tries: Cabanier; Con.: G. Camberabero; Drops: G. Camberabero (2) |

Lansdowne Road, Dublin
Attendance: 50,000
Referee: R. P. Burrell (Scotland)

1967-04-15

| Wales | 34–21 | England |
| Tries: Bebb; G. Davies (2); Jarrett; Morris; Con.: Jarrett (5); Pen.: Jarrett (2); Drops: Raybould | | Tries: Barton (2); Savage; Pen.: Hosen (4) |

National Stadium, Cardiff
Referee: D. C. J. McMahon (Scotland)

Source for match results and dates:
