= Jeff Sayle =

Jeff Sayle may refer to:

- Jeff Sayle (motorcyclist) (born 1954), Australian Grand Prix motorcycle road racer
- Jeff Sayle (rugby union) (1942–2019), Australian rugby union international
