= List of Brisbane Boys' College Old Boys =

This is a list of notable alumni who attended Brisbane Boys' College. Alumni of Brisbane Boys' College are known as Old Collegians and may elect to join the school's alumni association, the BBC Old Collegians' Association.

== Academic ==
- George G. Watson – Cambridge don

== Business ==
- David Lenigas – Chief Executive Officer of Lonrho Africa Limited

== Defence ==
- Galfry Gatacre CBE DSC DSO (1907–1983) – Royal Australian Navy rear admiral and first-class cricketer
- Squadron Leader Beaufort Mosman Hunter Palmer – pilot, war hero, farmer

== Media and arts ==
- Charles Cottier – actor
- Rex Cramphorn – theatre director, costume designer, critic and translator
- Lachlan Gillespie – member of The Wiggles
- Darren Middleton – musician, former member of Powderfinger
- Alexander Voltz – composer

== Medicine and health sciences ==
- Franklin White – president of Canadian Public Health Association (1986–88); Medal of Honor (1997) Pan-American Health Organization; endowed chair at Dalhousie University (1982–89) and Aga Khan University 1998–2003

== Rhodes Scholars ==
- Hugh Dunn (1949)
- John Wylie (1983)

== Sport ==
=== Australian rules football ===
- Clint Bizzell – Geelong Football Club and Melbourne Demons
- Courtenay Dempsey – Essendon Bombers
- Chris Scott – Brisbane Lions
- Hamish Simpson – Geelong Cats

=== Cricket ===
- Chris Hartley – Queensland Bulls
- Craig Philipson – Queensland Bulls
- Jack Clayton – Queensland Bulls

=== Rowing ===
- Haimish Karrasch – Olympic Games 1996 and 2000

=== Tennis ===
- Dane Sweeny – Top 200 Tennis Player

=== Rugby league ===
- Dane Gagai – Brisbane Broncos and Newcastle Knights
- Jack Howarth – Melbourne Storm

=== Rugby union ===
- Tom Banks – Queensland Reds, ACT Brumbies, Wallabies
- Angus Cottrell – Melbourne Rebels flanker
- Hugh Dunn – Uncapped Queensland, Rugby Half Blue and Blue – University of Queensland, Australian Universities
- Will Genia – Queensland Reds and the Wallabies (Vice Captain); now plays for Melbourne Rebels
- Carter Gordon – Melbourne Rebels and Wallabies
- Roger Gould – Queensland Reds and the Wallabies
- Ben Gunter – plays for the Panasonic Wild Knights (Japan) and has also represented the Japanese Brave Blossoms
- James Horwill – Queensland Reds and the Wallabies; former Qld Reds and Australian Wallabies Captain; Harlequins
- Len Ikitau – Brumbies and Wallabies
- Darcy Swain – Western Force, Brumbies and Wallabies
- John Roe – Queensland Reds and the Wallabies; former Qld Reds Captain

=== Football ===
- Zachary Anderson – Central Coast Mariners
- Ross Archibald – Melbourne Heart

=== Swimming ===
- Kieren Perkins OAM – Olympic gold medallist

=== Track & field ===
- Matthew McEwen – decathlete, silver medalist, Manchester Commonwealth Games 2002
- Ashley Moloney – decathlete, 2020 Olympic Games bronze medalist
- Mitchell Watt – long jumper, silver medalist, London Summer Olympics 2012
