= André Dubertrand =

France international rugby union player

- Born: 25 April 1950 (age 76) Saubion, France
- Height: 5 ft 9 in (175 cm)
- Weight: 172 lb (78 kg)

Rugby union career
- Position: Wing
International career
Years	Team	Apps	(Points)
1971–76	France	13	(20)

André Dubertrand (born 25 April 1950) is a French former international rugby union player.

Born in Saubion, Dubertrand was a wing three–quarter and is known by the nickname "Robino". He started out with US Tyrosse, before beginning a long career for AS Montferrand in 1970. Between 1971 and 1976, Dubertrand gained 13 France caps and his five international tries included a hat–trick against Romania. He was a member of the AS Montferrand side which won the 1976 Challenge Yves du Manoir title.

Dubertrand was a police officer by profession.

== See also ==
- List of France national rugby union players
