= Brian Weir =

Australian rugby union player (born 1947)

- Full name: Brian Anthony Weir
- Born: 9 September 1947 (age 79) Kiama, NSW, Australia

Rugby union career
- Position: Fullback
International career
Years	Team	Apps	(Points)
1969	Australia		

Brian Anthony Weir (born 9 September 1947) is an Australian former international rugby union player.

Raised in the Illawarra, Weir was born in Kiama and attended Wollongong's Edmund Rice College, where his rugby teammates included future Wallabies centre Geoff Shaw.

Weir, a fullback, was known for his long and accurate kicking game.

A NSW Country representative player, Weir won a place on the Wallabies squad for their 1969 tour to South Africa, after a strong goal-kicking performance for the "Possibles" during the trials. He served as an understudy to Arthur McGill and was restricted to the non-international tour matches, amassing over 50 points.

== See also ==
- List of Australia national rugby union players
