= Ken Oliver =

Ken Oliver may refer to:

- Ken Oliver (footballer)
- Ken Oliver (racehorse trainer)
- Ken Oliver (rugby union)

== See also ==
- Kenneth Oliver, American politician
