= Doug Rees =

Doug Rees may refer to:

- Doug Rees (footballer)
- Doug Rees (rugby union)
- Douglas C. Rees, American biochemist, biophysicist, and structural biologist
