= Shane Sullivan =

Australia international rugby union player

- Full name: Shane Stephen Sullivan
- Born: 7 September 1945 (age 81) Brisbane, QLD, Australia
- Height: 183 cm (6 ft 0 in)
- Weight: 105 kg (231 lb)
- School: St Joseph's College, Nudgee
- University: University of Queensland
- Occupation: General practitioner

Rugby union career
- Position: Prop
Provincial / State sides
Years	Team	Apps	(Points)
- Queensland
International career
Years	Team	Apps	(Points)
1969	Australia		

Shane Stephen Sullivan (born 7 September 1945) is an Australian former international rugby union player.

A Brisbane native, Sullivan completed his secondary schooling at St Joseph's College, Nudgee, where he played 1st XV rugby in his last year, before continuing his studies at the University of Queensland.

Sullivan, a specialist tighthead prop, played for Brisbane club Brothers and made his Queensland state debut in 1968. He was one of six Brothers players to earn Wallabies selection for the 1969 tour of South Africa, preferred over the already capped Ross Turnbull. Over the course of the tour, Sullivan started 11 of a possible 24 matches for the Wallabies, while sitting out the Test matches, with Roy Prosser and Jim Roxburgh the favoured combination.

While studying medicine in England, Sullivan competed in the Hospitals Cup for St Bartholomew's Hospital.

Sullivan was a general practitioner in Toowoomba, Queensland.

== See also ==
- List of Australia national rugby union players
