= Brian O'Brien =

Brian O'Brien may refer to:

- Brian O'Brien (optical physicist) (1898–1992), American optical physicist and the founder of the Air Force Studies Board
- Brian O'Brien (space scientist) (1934–2020), Australian physicist and space scientist
- Brian O'Brien (rugby union) (1939–2023), Irish rugby union player and coach
- Brian O'Brien (journalist) (1922–1982), New Zealand sports journalist and politician
- Clock (character), a fictional crime-fighter whose alter ego is Brian O'Brien

== See also ==
- Brian O'Brian, an Italian-American series of television shorts
