= Peter Bell (rugby union) =

English rugby union player

- Full name: Peter Joseph Bell
- Born: 28 April 1937 (age 89) Wandsworth, England

Rugby union career
- Position: Flanker
International career
Years	Team	Apps	(Points)
1968	England	4	(0)

Peter Joseph Bell (born 28 April 1937) is an English former international rugby union player.

Born in Wandsworth, Bell played his rugby as a flanker with Blackheath and was capped four times for England during his career. He featured in all of England's 1968 Five Nations fixtures and had to play most of their match against Ireland as a make shift scrum-half, after Bill Redwood went off injured.

Bell was a farmer in his post-rugby years.

== See also ==
- List of England national rugby union players
