= Goldicott =

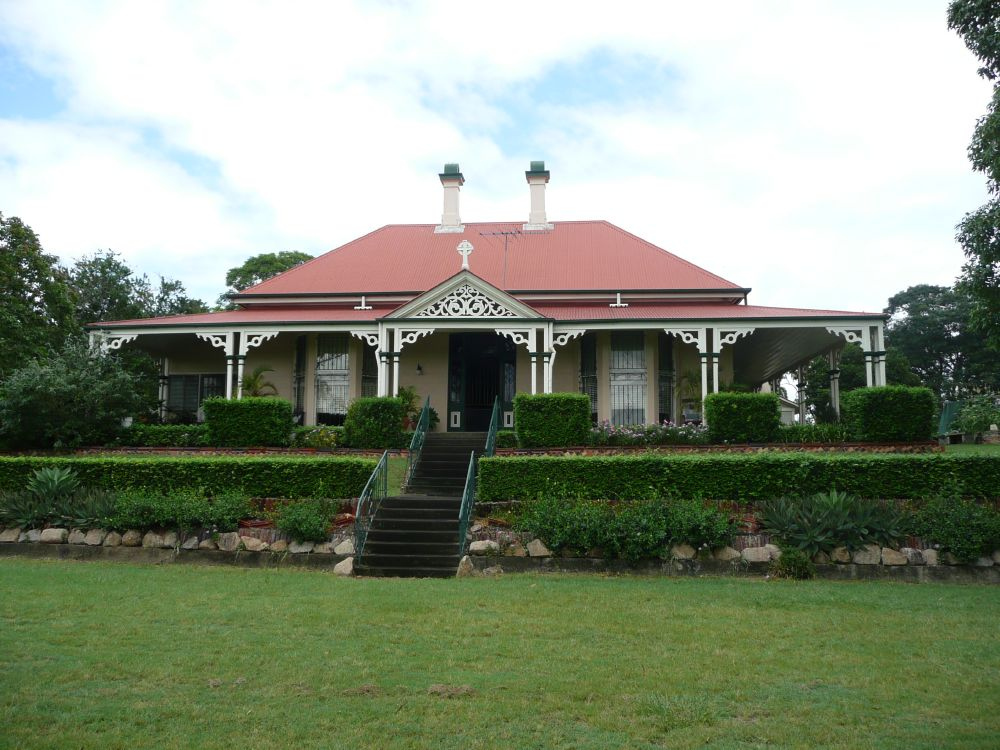
- Goldicott, as Mount St Mary's Convent, 2009

- Location within Queensland
- Former names: Mount St Mary's Convent

General information
- Status: Completed
- Type: Residence
- Architectural style: Classicism
- Location: 50 Grove Street, Toowong, Brisbane, Queensland, Australia
- Coordinates: 27°29′11″S 152°59′11″E
- Year built: 1885 – c. 1918
- Owner: Brisbane Boys' College

Technical details
- Material: Concrete
- Floor area: 15 by 15 metres (50 by 50 ft)

Queensland Heritage Register
- Official name: Mount St Mary's Convent, Goldicott
- Type: State heritage (built, landscape)
- Designated: 26 November 1998
- Reference no.: 601601
- Significant period: 1880s, 1900s, 1940s (historical) ongoing (social); 1880s, 1910s (fabric)
- Significant components: Trees/plantings, convent/nunnery, residential accommodation – housing, terracing, tennis court, furniture/fittings, garden/grounds

Goldicott is a heritage-listed house, set on 1.23 hectares (3.0 acres), located at 50 Grove Street, Toowong, Brisbane, Queensland, Australia. It was built from 1885 to c. 1918.

Between 1902 and 2017, the house was owned by the Roman Catholic church, and operated as a convent, known as Mount St Mary's Convent. The property was added to the Queensland Heritage Register on 26 November 1998.

Goldicott is currently owned by the Brisbane Boys' College.

== History ==
=== Depree family ===
This substantial, single-storeyed concrete residence was erected in 1885 for engineer Charles Lambert Depree and his family, using a construction method patented by Depree in Queensland in November 1871.

Depree was born in London c. 1845, studied engineering at King's College 1861–63, and while articled (1864–67) worked on several railway engineering contracts in Britain. In 1868 he was working in France, and there acquired an interest in concrete construction. The following year, Depree and his wife emigrated to Queensland, settling in Fortitude Valley in Brisbane. In June 1870, Depree erected a small concrete building at Fortitude Valley to demonstrate the potential of this material for Queensland construction, as a result of which he acquired several Government contracts. In November 1871 he patented an improved method of building in concrete, a system of moveable formwork. From 1872 until 1890 he was employed by the Queensland Railways Department, and as resident engineer in charge of the Stanthorpe section of the Southern and Western Railway, 1875–77, initiated the first Queensland use of concrete for culverts and a tunnel. In 1878 Depree was appointed District Engineer for Railways Maryborough, returning to Brisbane in the mid-1880s, where he took up the position of Assistant Engineer-in-Charge of Surveys from September 1886.

In mid-1885, following his return to Brisbane, Depree erected his family home, Goldicott, on land at Toowong to which he had acquired title in 1874. Depree's purchase extended from the southern side of the hill above Kensington Terrace down to Sherwood Road, and from the crest above Kensington Terrace, the site offered extensive views over Toowong, Auchenflower and Milton. It had been part of several larger parcels of land alienated separately by EJ Bennett and John Collings in the late 1850s. Toowong, a "fashionable" suburb since the 1860s, developed rapidly after the opening of Toowong railway station on the Brisbane to Ipswich railway line in 1875. In the mid-1880s, Goldicott was in close proximity to bus and railway transport, School of Arts, state primary school and two private schools, and gas and water were laid along Sherwood Road.

Goldicott was Brisbane's first poured concrete house, constructed in the monolithic, or one stone, process, using Depree's patented system of movable formwork and apparently built to his design. Contractors Rose and James were employing the technique for the first time.

In July 1885, this unique method of housing construction warranted an article in the Brisbane Courier. The house was described as a substantial residence, measuring 15 by 15 metres (50 by 50 ft) with 3.0-metre (10 ft) wide verandahs all around, and walls 4.6 metres (15 ft) high. All the walls and footings were constructed of concrete, the outer walls being 23 centimetres (9 in) thick, and the inner walls 15 centimetres (6 in). The floors and roof were of timber, the latter being clad in slates. The stone used in the concrete mix came from the site, and was described as a kind of greenstone, strongly impregnated with quartz. The article listed several advantages of building in concrete (presumably supplied by Depree): construction was marginally cheaper than brick; concrete was superior to brick in imperviousness to heat, damp and sound; little skilled labour was required for the construction; stone or gravel for the concrete mix could be obtained on site; and concrete was white-ant resistant.

Despite the press coverage, concrete housing did not capture popular imagination in the 1880s. Goldicott was erected just as Queensland was entering the most significant economic boom of the 19th century, when the new middle class could afford housing built of brick and stone, the traditional symbols of wealth and prestige. No other concrete houses of this period have been recorded in this State, and Goldicott remains important as an early Queensland experiment in concrete housing. The place may also be significant on a national level.

The Depree family resided at Goldicott from 1885 until 1890, when Charles Depree's failing health precipitated their return to England. He died there in August 1893, and although the family did not return to Queensland, Goldicott remained their property until 1902.

Following the Deprees' departure, Goldicott was let to Surveyor-General A McDowall, and then to William Lees. It remained vacant for some years in the mid-1890s, but by 1897 was occupied by contractor John McCormick, whose firm John McCormick & Son had erected the second Albert Railway Bridge at Indooroopilly in 1893–94, and won the contract for the ironwork on the second permanent Victoria Bridge, erected 1896–97.

=== Sisters of Mercy ===
In May 1902, the Goldicott Estate was subdivided and offered for auction, at which time the whole of the property, including the unfurnished house, was purchased by the Sisters of Mercy. The Sisters were to staff a new parish school to be established in nearby Holland Street, Toowong, and were seeking conveniently located accommodation. They took up residence in Goldicott, which was renamed Mount St Mary's Convent, in 1903. At this time the front room at the northeast corner of the house (probably formerly a bedroom), was converted into a chapel.

In 1916, Archbishop James Duhig created the parish of Toowong by separating Toowong and Indooroopilly from Rosalie, and placed it under the charge of a group of newly arrived Jesuit Fathers. At Toowong, these fathers established the first permanent Jesuit presence in Queensland. However, the Sisters of Mercy continued to staff the parish school in Holland Street, and in the late 1920s gave to the parish just under 3,000 square metres (0.75 acres) of land at the corner of Kensington Terrace and Grove Street, part of Mount St Mary's grounds, for the construction of a new church and school. The Church of Saint Ignatius Loyola, with the new school established in the undercroft, was opened and blessed on 18 May 1930. The Sisters continued to staff the parish school until the early 1980s.

A 1902 photograph of Goldicott reveals that the front terraces had been formed by this date, but many of the stone walls in the grounds of the convent may date to c. 1930, when the site for St Ignatius Church was being levelled and substantial quantities of stone would have become available. The eastern terrace, which contained an early tennis court, was most likely formed by 1902.

The timber wing at the rear of the convent was erected c. 1918, as a dormitory for children who were accepted as boarders at St Michael's (later St Ignatius) School. From the early 1900s, the Sisters had accommodated a few boarders at Mount St Mary's, but in 1919, this number increased to 19, and it is likely the dormitory wing was completed about this time. It is understood that the Sisters ceased taking in student boarders in the 1940s.

During the Second World War, a new classroom block was erected behind St Ignatius Church and fronting Grove Street, at which time the Sisters of Mercy agreed that students could use part of the convent grounds (the terrace on the northern side of the house) as a playground. Later the eastern terrace was developed as a playing field with tennis and basketball courts. Sloping land at the rear of the convent was filled gradually, and levelled for a playing field in the 1980s.

As well as teaching general subjects, the Sisters encouraged cultural pursuits such as music and speech lessons. At some stage a small weatherboard building had been moved onto the convent grounds for use as a music room. At one time the date of this building was recorded as "prior to 1967" however aerial photos from the 1930s show the building to be onsite by at least 1937. There is anecdotal evidence that the building once formed part of the Premiers Stables at Auchenflower House. Bernard Fanning, the lead singer of Powderfinger, took music lessons in the building. In 1992 the building was refurbished, at which time a hand painted, full-length mural on the walls of the entrance hall was revealed and subsequently covered again with wallpaper.

Goldicott remained the property of the Sisters of Mercy and functioned as a convent until 2017 when it was sold to a property developer. Until it was sold, the house, music room and land had strong ties to the Toowong Catholic Community, being used for formal and informal events. For many years an opera event called Goldicott Under the Stars was held in the grounds of the house as a fund raiser for the neighbouring Catholic school.

=== Redevelopment plans ===
In 2018 the property developer sought permission to rezone the land, subdivide the property and demolish the historic weatherboard music room building. It was reported that the developer intended to erect a 600-bed aged care facility. Thousands of locals objected to the plans and the development application was rejected by the Brisbane City Council. The developer appealed against Council's decision to the Queensland Planning and Environment Court. Numerous objectors joined the proceedings and gave evidence of the heritage value of the house, music room, and surrounds. On 21 April 2020, Justice Rackemann dismissed the appeal in part, ruling that the grounds of Goldicott House cannot be rezoned or subdivided for development.

=== Brisbane Boys' College ===
In 2022 it was reported that the neighbouring Brisbane Boys' College, in partnership with the Presbyterian Methodist Schools Association, settled on the purchase of the 1.23-hectare (3.0-acre) Goldicott House, outlaying A$17 million.

== Description ==
Golidcott is a substantial one-storeyed concrete house situated on a prominent site in Grove Crescent, Toowong, overlooking the adjacent St Ignatius Catholic Church and with expansive views of Toowong and the Brisbane central business district.

The house is sited on a ridge and the property is terraced and has established vegetation including a Hoop Pine, jacarandas, frangipannis, mango trees and assorted eucalyptus. A simple timber building dominates the entrance to Mount St Mary's Convent from Grove Crescent. Original concrete steps leading to the house on the eastern side are decorated with early large terracotta urns.

The house consists of the 1885 concrete section and a two-storey timber extension at the rear. The concrete section has a simple rectangular plan surrounded on three sides by a wide timber verandah, the soffit of which is clad with beaded boards and supported on pairs of square timber columns featuring large decorative timber sweeps. The high pitched double hipped roof of the early house, is clad with corrugated iron sheeting and abuts a smaller hipped section over the dining room. This principal roof is distinct from the hipped roof over the kitchen wing and later extensions.

The early section of the house is constructed of mass concrete prepared in situ and cast with the specially devised movable formwork. The early concrete foundations have recently been underpinned. The external faces of the concrete walls on the verandah are rendered and scoured in imitation of ashlar stonework, whilst other external faces are plain rendered.

The main entrance is on the north facade of the house, accessed by two tiers of recent concrete stairs. A large entrance door with side lights and a transom, is emphasised by a gable featuring a decorative timber fretwork panel. The doorway is flanked by two full length bay windows, of concrete construction, with full length sash walk through windows. A cavity above the window conceals the opened lower sash. The building features many timber framed vertical sash windows, with concrete sills. Several former walk-through windows have been shortened to form conventional sash windows, by introducing timber panels in the lower section of the original doorway.

The interior is planned around a central entrance hall and adjoining L-shaped corridor, off which the major rooms are accessed. Though the wall finishes in the entrance hall are recent, beneath the wall-paper is a full length mural depicting flora and bird-life. The hall is fitted with an original gas light fitting. To the right of the entrance hall is the parlour and community room which are separated by two full-height three-leaf timber folding doors, extending the width of the room. A white marble fireplace with early ceramic tiles is featured in the parlour, and an ebonised timber fireplace, featuring etched relief patterns, is in the rear community room. To the left of the entrance hall is the room now used as a prayer room, but originally likely to have been the main bedroom. A number of bedrooms open from the corridor beyond the entrance hall. These bedrooms also open onto a rear or side verandah, allowing access to the bathroom in the south-eastern corner. Early beaded board timber partitioning occurs in one of the bedrooms.

The dining room adjoins the single storeyed early timber kitchen wing, onto which the double storeyed timber extension was constructed. The kitchen is now partitioned, and an early external brick chimney shows the extent of the original room. This wing is connected to the main house by an open timber verandah walkway extending to the later timber addition.

The interior walls are generally of concrete, finished with wall-paper and featuring a reproduction cornice. The floor has been raised which has caused shallow skirting boards.

== Heritage listing ==
Mount St Mary's Convent was listed on the Queensland Heritage Register on 26 November 1998 having satisfied the following criteria.

The place is important in demonstrating the evolution or pattern of Queensland's history.

Mount St Mary's Convent (Goldicott) was erected during the second phase of Toowong's development, following the opening of Toowong railway station in 1875, and is important in illustrating:

1. the retention of the ridge above Kensington Terrace and Sherwood Road as an area of substantial homes situated within extensive grounds, this pattern having been established in the early 1860s
2. the emergence of ribbon development along Brisbane's late 19th century railways.

The place demonstrates rare, uncommon or endangered aspects of Queensland's cultural heritage.

Mount St Mary's Convent (Goldicott), erected in 1885, was the first poured concrete house in Brisbane, and probably in Queensland. It is significant as an early and very rare Queensland experiment in concrete housing, and is important in demonstrating a high degree of technical achievement. The concrete construction was innovative and remarkable for its time. The place is significant for its association with engineer Charles Lambert Depree, and his contribution to concrete construction implementation and technology in 19th century Queensland.

Mount St Mary's Convent (Goldicott) has retained a considerable proportion of its original grounds which allow the house to remain remote in the midst of extensive development. This is a rare example of an 1880s house in Toowong which has retained substantial grounds and outlook.

The place has potential to yield information that will contribute to an understanding of Queensland's history.

It is significant as an early and very rare Queensland experiment in concrete housing, and is important in demonstrating a high degree of technical achievement. The concrete construction was innovative and remarkable for its time.

The place is important because of its aesthetic significance.

Established trees and terraces contribute to its aesthetic significance by contributing to the building's picturesque qualities. The house has a number of early fittings, including the entrance hall light fitting and various joinery items.

The place is important in demonstrating a high degree of creative or technical achievement at a particular period.

Mount St Mary's Convent (Goldicott), erected in 1885, was the first poured concrete house in Brisbane, and probably in Queensland. It is significant as an early and very rare Queensland experiment in concrete housing, and is important in demonstrating a high degree of technical achievement. The concrete construction was innovative and remarkable for its time. The place is significant for its association with engineer Charles Lambert Depree, and his contribution to concrete construction implementation and technology in 19th century Queensland.

The place has a strong or special association with a particular community or cultural group for social, cultural or spiritual reasons.

Mount St Mary's Convent (Goldicott) is significant also for its special association with the Sisters of Mercy and their important educational, cultural and pastoral work in Toowong parish for well over 90 years.

The place has a special association with the life or work of a particular person, group or organisation of importance in Queensland's history.

Mount St Mary's Convent (Goldicott) is significant also for its special association with the Sisters of Mercy.
