= 1974–75 RFU Knockout Cup =

English rugby cup

1974–75 RFU National KO competition

Tournament statistics

The 1974–75 RFU National KO competition was the fourth edition of England's premier rugby union club competition at the time. Bedford won the competition defeating Rosslyn Park in the final. The final was held at Twickenham Stadium. This Final was the last appearance at Twickenham of one of England's finest players Budge Rogers.

== Draw and results ==
=== First round ===
Team one	Team two	Score
Bournemouth	Bedford	6-66
Nottingham	Sale	6-16
Blackheath	Wasps	9–3
Coventry	Bradford	40–10
Bristol	Plymouth Albion	7–6
Northampton	Gosforth	4–7
Solihull	Liverpool	6–7
Falmouth	Bath	9-9*
Aylesbury	London Scottish	12–39
Rosslyn Park	London Welsh	22–9
Morpeth	Stockwood Park	10–0
Maidstone	London Irish	16-19
Moseley	Wilmslow	15–7
Streatham-Croydon	Richmond	3–10
Morley	Waterloo	16-7
Gloucester	St Luke's College	21–3

Progress to next round as away team*

=== Second round ===
Team one	Team two	Score
Bedford	Sale	23-3
Blackheath	Coventry	6-32
Bristol	Gosforth	3-13
Liverpool	Bath	6-12
London Scottish	Rosslyn Park	6-11
Morpeth	London Irish	19-3
Moseley	Gloucester	10-7
Richmond	Morley	14-6

=== Quarter-finals ===
Team one	Team two	Score
Bath	Morpeth	9-13
Bedford	Gosforth	12-6
Richmond	Coventry	0-3
Rosslyn Park	Moseley	21-7

=== Semi-finals ===
Team one	Team two	Score
Bedford	Coventry	13-6
Morpeth	Rosslyn Park	6-28

=== Final ===
26 April 1975

Bedford	28–12	Rosslyn Park
Try: Derek Wyatt; Chris Bailward; Bob Demming (2); Brian Keen; Con: Neil Bennett (4)		Try: David McKay (2); Bob Fisher

Twickenham Stadium, London
Attendance: 18,000
Referee: R.F 'Johnny' Johnson (London)

15	Tony Jorden
14	Bob Demming
13	Richard Chadwick
12	John Howard
11	Derek Wyatt
10	Neil Bennett
9	Alun Lewis
1	Brian Keen
2	Norman Barker
3	Chris Bailward
4	Clive Hooker
5	Bob Wilkinson
6	Andy Hollins
7	Budge Rogers (c)
8	Foster Edwards
Replacements (none used):
16	Chris Davies
17	Ashley Johnson
18	David Jackson
19	Guy Fletcher
20	Steve Wells
21	Brian Page
Coach:
Patrick Briggs

15	Ray Codd
14	Rob Fisher
13	Chris Saville
12	Mark Bazalgette
11	David McKay
10	Phil Treseder
9	Lionel Weston
1	Les Barlow
2	Phil Keith-Roach (c)
3	Paddy Hinton
4	Tony Rodgers
5	Neil Mantell
6	Paul Anderson
7	Geoff Link
8	Andy Ripley
Coach:
Peter Berryman / Glen Robertson
