= Brian Keen =

England international rugby union player

- Full name: Brian Warwick Keen
- Born: 1 June 1944 (age 82) Bury St Edmunds, England
- School: The Thomas Hardye School
- University: Newcastle University

Rugby union career
- Position: Prop
International career
Years	Team	Apps	(Points)
1968	England	4	(0)

Brian Warwick Keen (born 1 June 1944) is an English former international rugby union player.

Keen was born in Bury St Edmunds and attended The Thomas Hardye School.

While a fourth-year student at Newcastle University, Keen was capped four times for England across the 1968 Five Nations, as a loose-head prop. He also represented Northumberland.

Keen had several seasons with Moseley, then had to step away from rugby for two years due to business commitments, with his work taking him to Brazil. He returned to the sport in 1972 to play for Newcastle club Northern and later competed with Bedford, winning a RFU Knockout Cup title in 1974–75.

== See also ==
- List of England national rugby union players
