= Brian O'Brien (rugby union) =

Irish rugby union player (1939–2023)

- Born: Brian Anthony Philip O'Brien; 5 July 1939 Limerick, County Limerick, Ireland
- Died: 28 February 2023 (aged 83) Limerick, County Limerick, Ireland

Rugby union career
- Position: Centre
Amateur team(s)
| Years | Team | Apps | (Points) |
| 1955–1970 | Shannon | | |
Provincial / State sides
| Years | Team | Apps | (Points) |
- Munster
International career
| Years | Team | Apps | (Points) |
| 1968 | Ireland | 3 | (0) |

Brian Anthony Philip O'Brien (5 July 1939 – 28 February 2023) was an Irish rugby union player, selector, coach and team manager.

== Career ==
In his youth, O'Brien played as a centre with Shannon. He was part of the club's first ever Munster Senior Cup success in 1960. O'Brien later became Shannon's first ever international when he was part of the Ireland squad for the 1968 Five Nations.

O'Brien spent nearly 15 years playing at senior level with Shannon, before going on to coach them to consecutive Munster Senior Cup titles in 1977 and 1978. He later served as a selector for Ireland and the British and Irish Lions during the latter's 1983 tour to New Zealand. O'Brien's other coaching roles included periods as manager of the Irish U21 team and the Shannon team that won four successive All-Ireland League titles. He also served as team manager of the Munster and Ireland teams.

== Death ==
O'Brien died in Limerick on 28 February 2023, at the age of 83.
