= Russell Manning =

Australian rugby union international

- Full name: Russell Charles Sylvester Manning
- Born: 10 January 1945 (age 81) Brisbane, Australia
- School: Brisbane Boys' College
- University: University of Queensland

Rugby union career
- Position: Fullback
International career
| Years | Team | Apps | (Points) |
| 1967 | Australia | 1 | (0) |

Russell Charles Sylvester Manning (born 10 January 1945) is an Australian former rugby union international.

Manning was born in Brisbane and attended Brisbane Boys' College. As a schoolboy, he was a 1st XI cricket and 1st XV rugby team member, then played first-grade in both sports while studying law at the University of Queensland.

A fullback, Manning was capped once for the Wallabies, against the All Blacks at Wellington's Athletic Park in the only Test of the 1967 tour. He retired a season later to concentrate on a legal career.

== See also ==
- List of Australia national rugby union players
