= David Lenigas =

Australian mining engineer

David Anthony Lenigas (born 1961, Adelaide, South Australia) is an Australian mining engineer with a Western Australian First Class Mine Managers Certificate. He has extensive corporate experience at chairman and CEO levels on many of the world's leading stock exchanges. Lenigas was appointed chairman of NQ Minerals Plc on 19 October 2019.

Lenigas was educated at Brisbane Boys' College and the Kalgoorlie School of Mines, graduating with a Bachelor of Science (Mining Engineering) (Distinction) from Curtin University Kalgoorlie School of Mines, Western Australia.

== Career ==
Since October 2019, Lenigas holds the position of chairman of NQ Minerals, an Australian-based mining company which commenced base metal and precious metal production in 2018 at its flagship Hellyer Gold Mine in Tasmania. Lenigas orchestrated the agreement for NQ Minerals to buy the Beaconsfield Gold Mine in Tasmania on 21 February 2020. On 1 December 2020, Lenigas worked with ING Bank to sign a US$55 million loan facility for NQ Minerals two weeks before the company would have been forced into administration. NQ Minerals shortly thereafter went into administration in August 2021.

== Corporate governance related criticisms ==
He has been accused of frequently "promoting a company, pushing up the (price of its) shares, then raising cash by placing new shares — and (thus) diluting the holdings of the early investors", described as "a familiar tale with most companies he promotes". His defence has been that "You can’t build a business on bottle tops." Furthermore, he has argued that it is not accurate to claim that "all his ventures have turned sour". Although finance commentators have noted that most of the "hundreds" of companies he has been involved in, and "stock promoted" for, have failed to generate any successful shareholder returns.

In 2009 he was one of a group of people claiming that he had been libelled when an investment publication in South Africa had described the group of executives of one of Lenigas' ventures as "cynically and greedily indulged in self-enrichment at the expense of, and contrary to the interests of, shareholders". The High Court of Justice of the United Kingdom rejected Lenigas' and the other claimants' libel claim, as only four people had read the article.
