= David Gay (rugby union) =

England international rugby union player

- Full name: David John Gay
- Born: 10 March 1948 (age 78) Bath, England
- Height: 6 ft 5 in (196 cm)
- Weight: 231 lb (105 kg)

Rugby union career
- Position: No. 8
International career
| Years | Team | Apps | (Points) |
| 1968 | England | 4 | (0) |

David John Gay (born 10 March 1948) is an English former international rugby union player.

Gay attended the City of Bath Technical School, from where he gained selection for England Schools Under-19s as a wing-forward. He played his club rugby with Bath. His brother, fullback Allen, was a Bath and Somerset teammate.

In 1968, Gay was the England number eight for all four of their Five Nations matches.

Gay became a solicitor.

== See also ==
- List of England national rugby union players
