= Boyo James =

- Full name: John Boyo James
- Born: 4 September 1938 (age 88) Blaengarw, Wales

Rugby union career
- Position: Prop
International career
Years	Team	Apps	(Points)
1968	Wales	1	(0)

John Boyo James (born 4 September 1938) was a Welsh international rugby union player.

Born in Blaengarw near Bridgend, James was a tighthead prop and won his solitary Wales cap late in his career, playing in a 11–11 draw against England at Twickenham as a 29-year old during the 1968 Five Nations.

James captained Bridgend and made over 400 appearances for the club.

== See also ==
- List of Wales national rugby union players
