= Brisbane Boys' College Buildings =

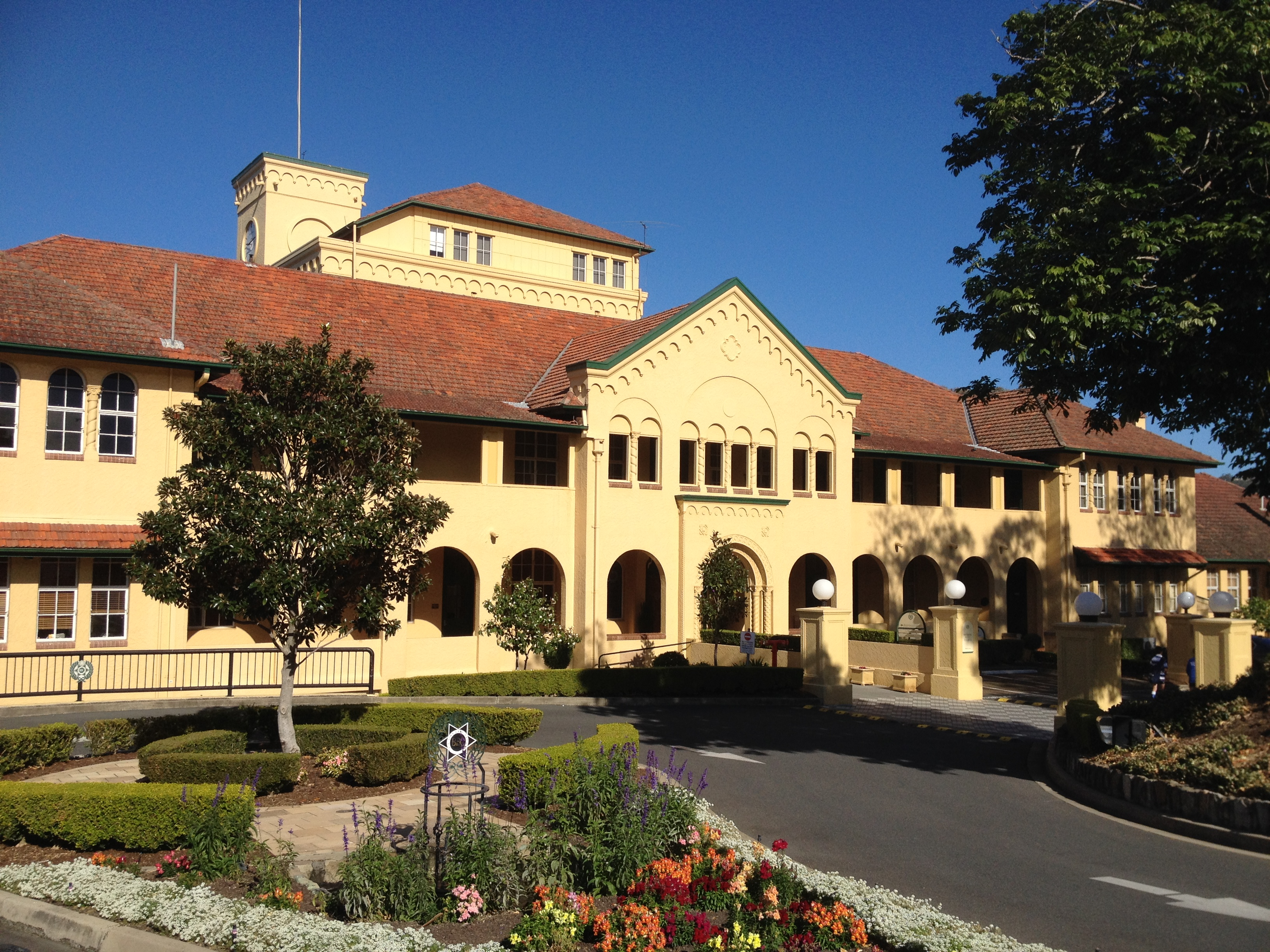
- Main Building, Brisbane Boys' College, 2014

- Location within Queensland
- 27.4885°S 152.9881°E
- Location: 55 Moggill Road, Toowong, City of Brisbane, Queensland, Australia

History
- Design period: 1919–1930s (interwar period)
- Built: 1930–1950

Queensland Heritage Register
- Official name: Brisbane Boys College
- Type: state heritage (built)
- Designated: 21 October 1992
- Reference no.: 600337
- Significant period: 1930s (fabric); 1930s (historical); 1930s ongoing (social)
- Significant components: stained glass window/s, tower, residential accommodation – headmaster's house, loggia/s, chapel, decorative features, school/school room

Brisbane Boys' College Buildings are the heritage-listed private school buildings at Brisbane Boys' College, 55 Moggill Road, Toowong, City of Brisbane, Queensland, Australia. They were built from 1930 to 1950. They were added to the Queensland Heritage Register on 21 October 1992.

== History ==
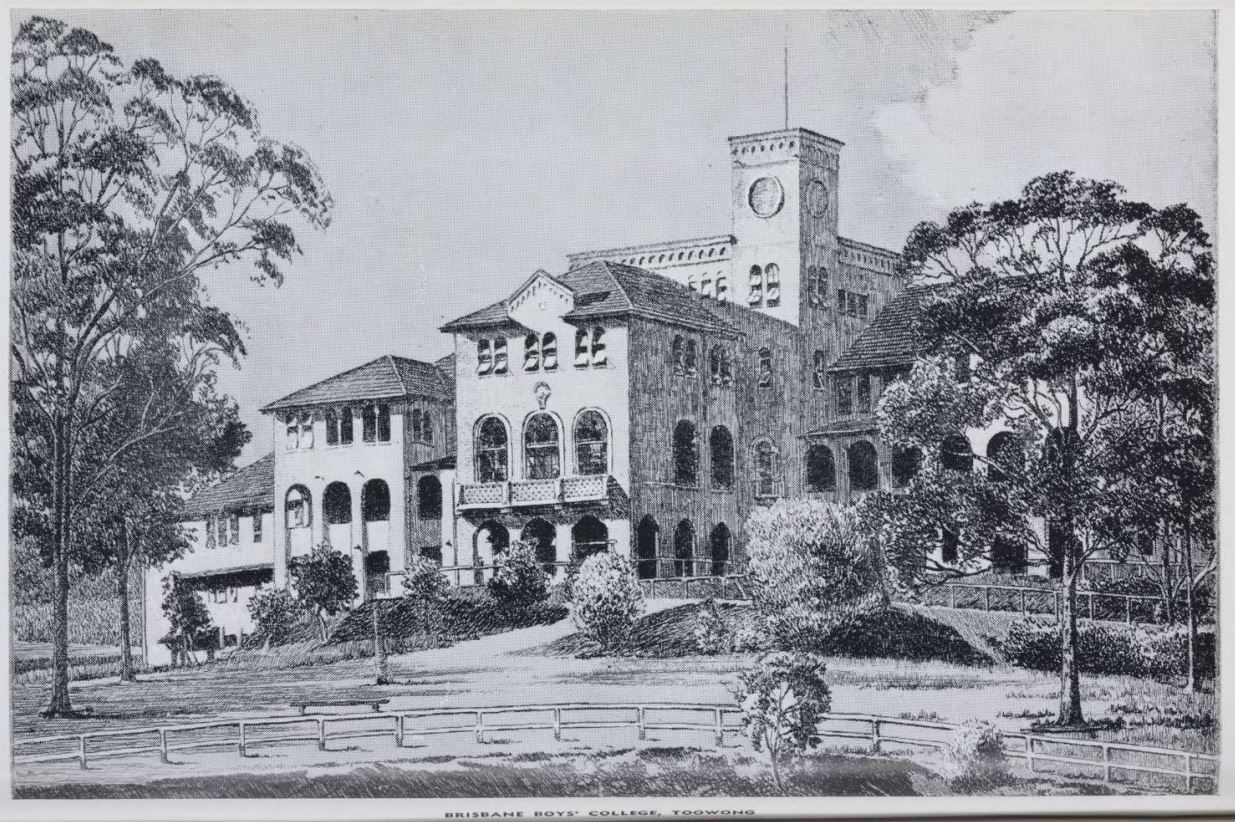
The college, circa 1947

The school was founded as Rudd's College in 1902 at Clayfield by A.W. Rudd. In 1918 it was taken over by the Presbyterian and Methodist Schools Association and renamed Brisbane Boys' College.

The main three-storeyed masonry school building, was built in 1930 at Toowong, on land donated by the daughters of Sir Robert Philp. Opened in 1931, the school with its boarding facilities was contained in one building. The building was designed by architects Atkinson and Conrad, who were also responsible for the design of The Southport School c. 1924–1928, and the Church of England Grammar School at East Brisbane 1917–1930.

Another storey was added to the main tower by 1950. The verandahs of the main building were enclosed to provide further accommodation but were opened again in 1989.

The headmaster's residence was built in 1936. It also was designed by Atkinson & Conrad. The school has continued to grow and now consists of numerous other buildings with an enrolment of over 1000 students.

== Description ==
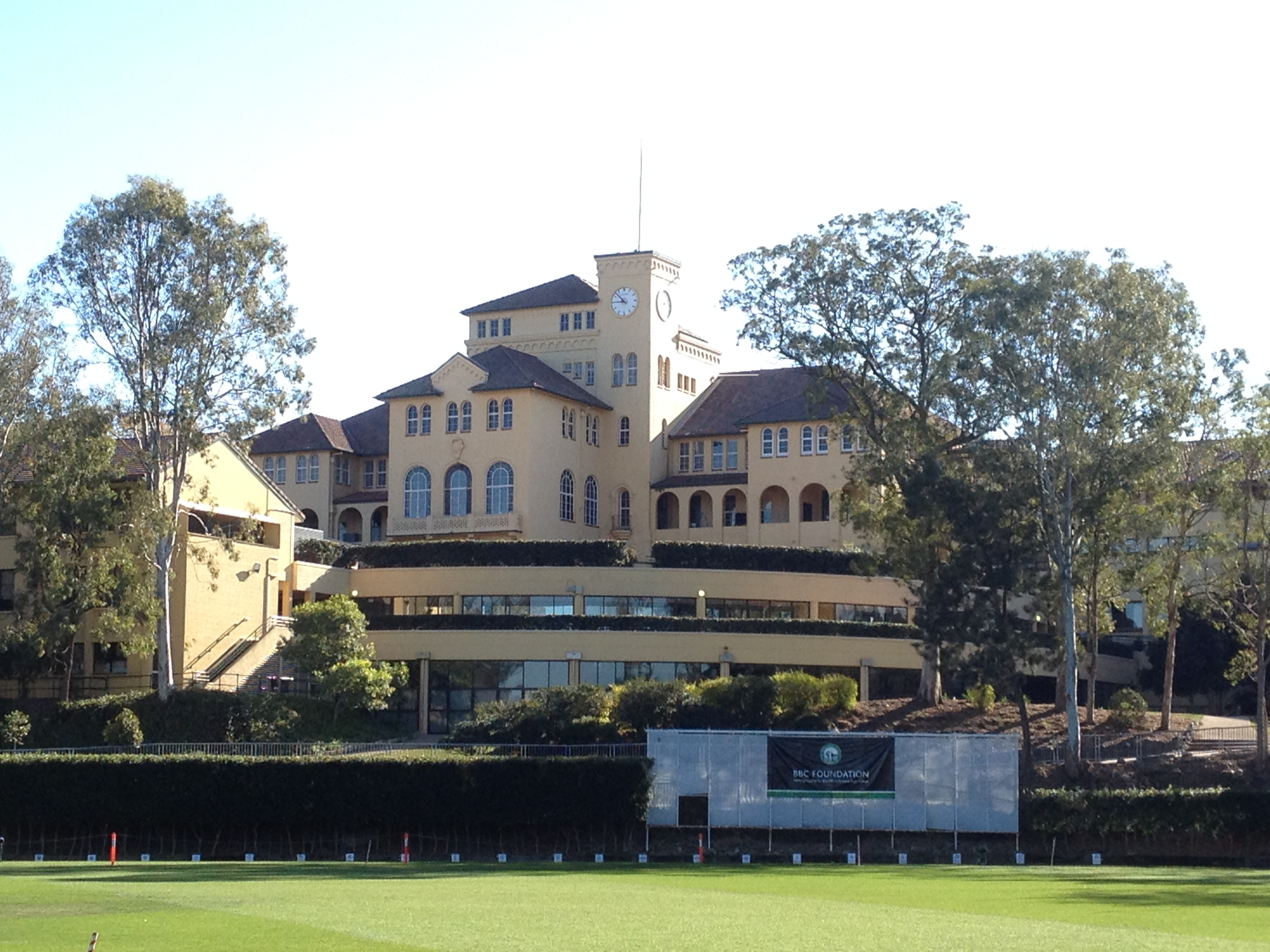
Main Building rises above the other buildings when viewed from Moggill Road, 2014

Sited slightly below the ridge of Kensington Terrace, the main building is a three-storeyed rendered masonry Spanish Mission style building. Classroom wings with terracotta tiled hipped roofs flank a central entrance, tower, and campanile. It has concrete floors, timber doors, steel hopper windows to the upper storeys, red brick sills, and rich decorative features to the facades and interior.

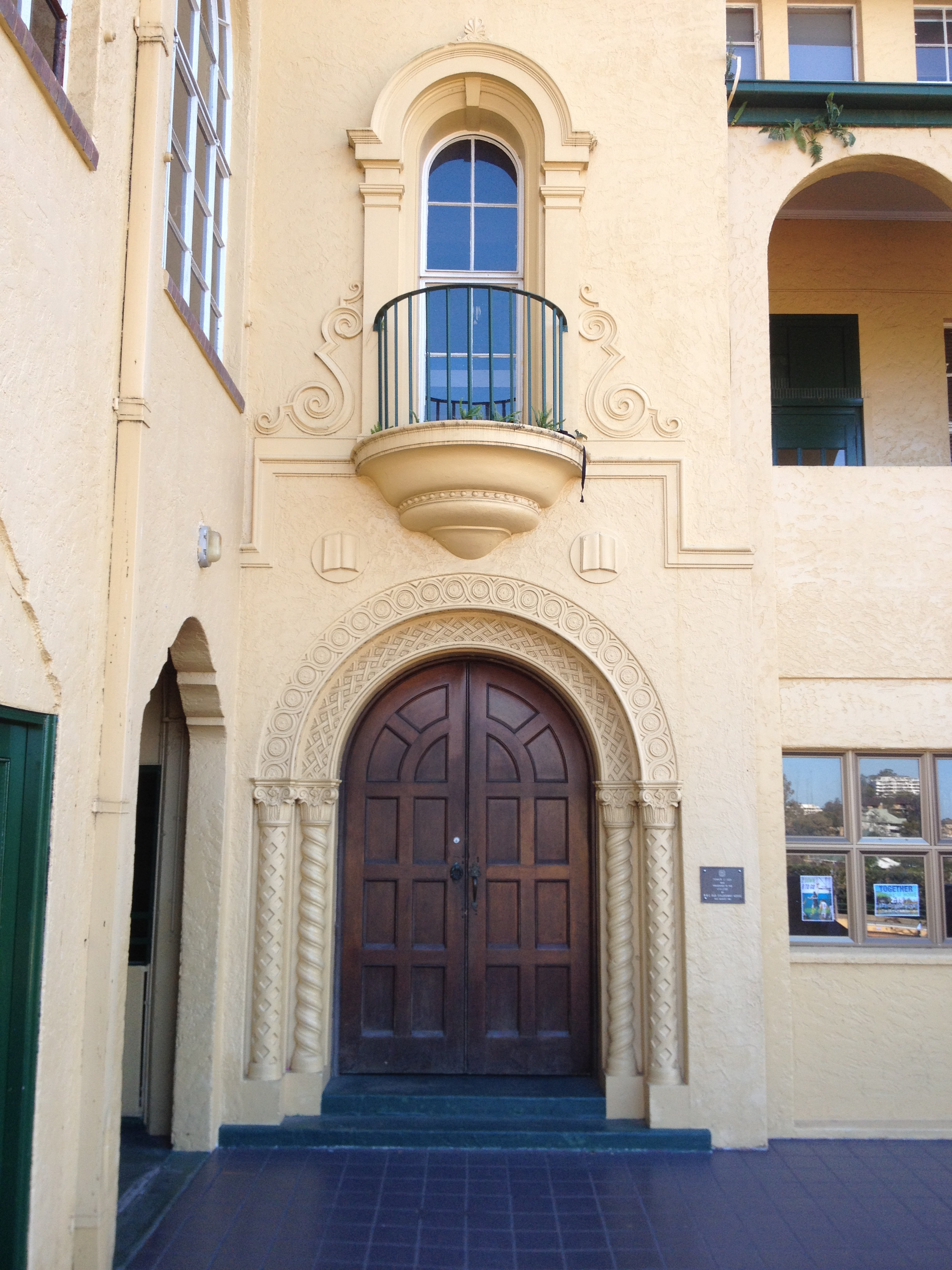
Door to the tower with the round balconette above, 2014

Seen from Moggill Road, the building rises above surrounding vegetation and roofs, being the most prominent building on the hillside. From within the school grounds, it dominates views up the hill from the north to the east, the campanile in particular being consistently visible. The neighbouring school buildings have been limited in height, preserving the vistas to and from the building.

The main entrance to the school is located on the northern frontage, which is two storeyed and divided into five bays. The central bay is gabled and features the main entrance doorway; the doorway is arched and set in a decorated rectangular frame. The two bays which flank the central entrance bays are arcaded with verandahs above, while the two outer bays have paired arched windows and tiled awnings.

The southern frontage, which overlooks the hillside, is three-storeyed, and also has five bays. The central bay, containing the chapel, extends out from the building, and has a hipped roof, with a small gable to the south. The tower behind rises another two storeys above the chapel, and has a pyramid roof. The flat-roofed campanile rises above the tower, and has an entrance at its base with a small round balconette above. The chapel has large arched windows with smaller arched windows above. The bays flanking the chapel and campanile are arcaded up to the second storey.

Decorative features to both frontages include gargoyles, twisted columns between arched windows and to principal doorways, and arched cornices to gables, the tower and the campanile. A three-storeyed annex extends to the north-east, sitting a half a storey below the rest of the building; it has a hipped roof, rectangular windows, tiled awnings to the south and a timber porch to the north.

Notable features of the interior include timber panelling and two stained glass windows, one depicting the arts, the other, the sciences, in the main entrance foyer. The chapel has a stained glass window to the south.

The headmaster's residence is an asymmetrical gabled composition in matching materials to the main building. It has three gables to the north, two timber-lined, with a smaller gable over the entrance, and is situated above an escarpment to the north of the main building.

== Heritage listing ==
Brisbane Boys' College Buildings were listed on the Queensland Heritage Register on 21 October 1992 having satisfied the following criteria.

The place is important in demonstrating the evolution or pattern of Queensland's history.

Brisbane Boys' College, Toowong, is significant historically for its association with the work of the Presbyterian and Methodist Churches in the provision of education for boys in Queensland since 1918.

The place is important in demonstrating the principal characteristics of a particular class of cultural places.

The main building demonstrates the principal characteristics of a substantial school building in the interwar Spanish Mission style, and the Headmaster's Residence is a good example of an interwar rendered masonry house.

The place is important because of its aesthetic significance.

The place is important for its aesthetic values, in particular the accomplished design in the composition of forms and detailing of the main building, which is also a prominent local landmark.

The place has a strong or special association with a particular community or cultural group for social, cultural or spiritual reasons.

The place has social significance as the alma mater of the sons of thousands of Protestant families in Queensland.

The place has a special association with the life or work of a particular person, group or organisation of importance in Queensland's history.

The main building and headmaster's residence are significant examples of the work of Brisbane architects Atkinson and Conrad, who designed a number of substantial private school buildings in Queensland during the interwar period.
