= Ian Procter =

Australian rugby union international

- Full name: Ian James Procter
- Born: 3 September 1947 New England, NSW, Australia
- Died: 2 July 2023 (aged 75)

Rugby union career
- Position: Centre / Wing
International career
Years	Team	Apps	(Points)
1967	Australia	1	(0)

Ian James Procter (3 September 1947 — 2 July 2023) was an Australian rugby union international.

Procter, a native of Tamworth, New South Wales, attended Gunnedah High School. He went to the University of New England for tertiary studies, playing his rugby for Wright College.

A three quarter, Procter was capped once for the Wallabies, against the All Blacks in the one-off Test in Wellington on the 1967 tour of New Zealand, playing on the right wing. The closest he got to further international caps was as a reserve in the team to play Scotland at the Sydney Cricket Ground in 1970.

Procter represented NSW, NSW Country and the Australian Capital Territory during his career, receiving captaincy honours for the latter in 1973. He played in Canberra for the Northern Suburbs club.

== See also ==
- List of Australia national rugby union players
