= Peter Reilly (rugby union) =

Australian rugby union international

- Full name: Norman Peter Reilly
- Born: 10 October 1944 (age 82) Roma, QLD, Australia

Rugby union career
- Position: Lock
International career
Years	Team	Apps	(Points)
1968–69	Australia	10	(0)

Norman Peter Reilly (born 10 October 1944) is an Australian former rugby union international.

Born in Roma, Queensland, Reilly attended Brisbane's St Joseph's College (Gregory Terrace).

A lock, Reilly was a first-grade player for Brothers and gained 10 Wallabies caps, debuting against the All Blacks at the Sydney Cricket Ground in 1968. His career coincided with a rebuilding phase for the Wallabies and he only featured in one Test win, over France in Sydney. He appeared in all four Tests on the 1969 tour of South Africa.

Reilly played rugby league for Past Brothers in the 1970s.

== See also ==
- List of Australia national rugby union players
