= Roger Pickering =

England international rugby union player

- Full name: Roger David Austin Pickering
- Born: 15 June 1943 (age 83) Birmingham, England

Rugby union career
- Position: Scrum-half
International career
| Years | Team | Apps | (Points) |
| 1967–68 | England | 6 | (0) |

Roger David Austin Pickering (born 15 June 1943) is an English former rugby union international.

Pickering, born in Birmingham, was educated at Whitcliffe Mount School in Cleckheaton, Yorkshire, which also produced England centre Jeff Butterfield. He played his rugby for Bradford.

Capped six times by England, Pickering debuted in the 1967 Five Nations. His first England cap was meant to come against the touring Wallabies in 1967, but after being named in the XV he had to withdraw at the last minute due to pharyngitis. He made his last appearance in a win over Scotland at Murrayfield in the 1968 Five Nations.

Pickering was the inaugural Five Nations chief executive and is also a former tournament director of the Heineken Cup.

Pickering resigned as Six Nations CEO in 2002.

== See also ==
- List of England national rugby union players
