= Bill Redwood =

England international rugby union player

- Full name: Brian William Redwood
- Born: 6 February 1939 (age 87) Bristol, England
- School: Bristol Grammar School
- University: University of Exeter; Worcester College, Oxford

Rugby union career
- Position: Scrum-half
International career
Years	Team	Apps	(Points)
1968	England	2	(3)

Brian William Redwood (born 6 February 1939) is an English former international rugby union player.

Redwood was born in Bristol and educated at Bristol Grammar School. He attended the University of Exeter and in 1961 appeared with Oxford University RFC while studying at Worcester College for a year.

A scrum-half, Redwood played much of his rugby with Bristol and achieved an England call up for the 1968 Five Nations, gaining two caps. On debut against Wales at Twickenham, Redwood scored a try and was considered to have performed well amongst an otherwise poor backline, helping England secure a draw. He made his second appearance in the match against Ireland at Twickenham which also finished in a draw, then lost his place to Roger Pickering.

== See also ==
- List of England national rugby union players
