= John Cole (rugby union) =

Australian rugby union international

- Full name: John Walter Cole
- Born: 20 September 1946 (age 80) Sydney, Australia

Rugby union career
- Position: Wing
International career
Years	Team	Apps	(Points)
1968–74	Australia	24	(21)

John Walter Cole (born 20 September 1946) is an Australian former rugby union international.

Cole was born in Sydney and educated at Maroubra Bay High School.

A winger, Cole played first-grade for Randwick, where he featured in four premiership teams. He was capped 24 times for the Wallabies playing on the right wing, debuting against the All Blacks at the Sydney Cricket Ground in 1968. On the following year's tour of South Africa, Cole played in all four Test matches for the Wallabies. He made his final international appearances in the 1974 home Bledisloe Cup matches.

Cole switched codes in 1975 after being signed by rugby league club Eastern Suburbs. He appeared in the 1975 Amco Cup but never played any NSWRFL first-grade games.

== See also ==
- List of Australia national rugby union players
