= Jeff Sayle (rugby union) =

Australian rugby union international

- Full name: Jeffrey Leonard Sayle
- Born: 25 August 1942 Stanmore, Sydney, Australia
- Died: 30 September 2019 (aged 77) Randwick, Sydney, Australia

Rugby union career
- Position: Flanker
International career
Years	Team	Apps	(Points)
1967	Australia	1	(0)

Jeffrey Leonard Sayle OAM (25 August 1942 — 30 September 2019) was an Australian rugby union international.

Sayle, born in Sydney, attended Maroubra Bay High School and was a product of Randwick juniors.

A flanker, Sayle gained a Wallabies cap on the 1967 tour of New Zealand for a one-off Test against the All Blacks to celebrate the NZRFU's 75th Jubilee. After 160 first-grade games for Randwick, he took over as the club's coach in 1982, with Bob Dwyer moving on to lead the national team. He coached Randwick to six Shute Shield titles.

Sayle received a Medal of the Order of Australia in the 2006 Australia Day Honours list for "service to Rugby Union football through the Randwick Rugby Union Club, and to surf lifesaving through the Coogee Surf Life Saving Club".

== See also ==
- List of Australia national rugby union players
