= Tony Abrahams =

- Full name: Anthony Morris Frederick Abrahams
- Born: 28 March 1944 (age 82) Sydney, Australia
- School: Cranbrook School
- University: University of Sydney
- Occupation: Lawyer

Rugby union career
- Position: Lock
International career
Years	Team	Apps	(Points)
1967–69	Australia	3	(0)

Anthony Morris Frederick Abrahams AM (born 28 March 1944) is an Australian former rugby union international.

== Biography ==
Educated at Cranbrook School, Sydney, Abrahams was a lock who was a reliable line-out jumper. He played first grade for Sydney University while studying for an Arts/Law degree.

Abrahams was capped three times for the Wallabies. He debuted in the one-off Test in Wellington on the 1967 tour of New Zealand, opposite Colin Meads. His other appearances were in home Tests against the All Blacks in 1968 and Wales in 1969. He made the squad for the 1969 tour of South Africa. During the tour, Abrahams met with various anti-apartheid figures and opted out of an early tour match against Rhodesia to protest the regime of Ian Smith. He became an outspoken apartheid critic and protested the 1971 South Africa rugby union tour of Australia.

In 2001 a Certificate of Appreciation, jointly signed by the South African High Commissioner Zolile Magugu and the co-convenors of the Anti-Apartheid Movement, Meredith Burgmann and Peter McGregor, was awarded to Abrahams and to each of the other six "Anti-Apartheid Wallabies" for their "personal sacrifice and outstanding contribution to the struggle for racial equality and democratic freedom in South Africa"

A lawyer by profession, Abrahams spent over two decades working for Clifford Chance in Paris and served as vice-president of the Association France-Australie. He was awarded the Member of the Order of Australia (AM) in the 2020 Australia Day Honours for "significant service to Australia-France relations, and to the law".

Abrahams is the grandson of Leonard Abrahams KC, a Sydney lawyer who was one of the fatalities of the 1938 Kyeema crash.

== See also ==
- List of Australia national rugby union players
