= Rod Kelleher =

Australia international rugby union player

- Born: Rodney James Kelleher; 8 November 1947 (age 79) Wellington

Rugby union career
- Position: flanker
International career
Years	Team	Apps	(Points)
1969	Wallabies	2	(0)

Rodney James "Rod" Kelleher (born 8 November 1947) was a rugby union player who represented Australia.

Kelleher, a flanker, was born in Wellington and claimed a total of 2 international rugby caps for Australia.
