= Roger Hosen =

English cricketer and rugby union player (1933-2005)

Roger Wills Hosen
- Born: 12 June 1933 Mabe, Cornwall, England
- Died: 9 April 2005 (aged 71) Truro, Cornwall, England
- School: Falmouth Grammar School
- Occupation: England Rugby Union Player

Rugby union career
- Position(s): Full-back, Wing
Youth career
- Penryn
Senior career
Years	Team	Apps	(Points)
1955-19??	Northampton	250	(1,463)
Provincial / State sides
Years	Team	Apps	(Points)
–	Cornwall	54	
International career
Years	Team	Apps	(Points)
–	Barbarians	2	
1963-1967	England	10	(46)

Roger Wills Hosen (12 June 1933 – 9 April 2005) was an English rugby union player and cricketer.

== Early life ==
He was born in Mabe and he first played rugby for Penryn while still at Falmouth Grammar School. He was an all round sportsman, who won ten England international rugby caps during 1963–67, played 54 games for Cornwall and also captained his county cricket team.

== Rugby International ==
In 1955 Roger Hosen moved to Northampton, to teach at the grammar school, and was recruited to Northampton Saints. He played 250 games for the Saints, and scored 1,463 points. He was also taught games at Warwick School in the late 1950s and early 60s.

In his one full season for England, Hosen established a record of forty-six points from five games. His England debut was made in New Zealand in 1963. He scored in all but one of his internationals, his highest scoring games being his last two, against Scotland and Wales in 1967. His preferred position was full back, but the competition provided by John Willcox and Don Rutherford confined Hosen to ten caps in 1963–67, of which seven were on the wing. He also played twice for the Barbarian F. C.

== Cornwall rugby and cricket ==
Hosen also played rugby 54 times for Cornwall, as well as also appearing 64 times for Cornwall in the Minor Counties cricket competition. He was a right hand bat and right arm pace bowler and he captained the county team from 1963 to 1967 making 1,444 runs, with a highest score of 100 not out. He played one first-class match when selected for the Minor Counties XI against the South African tourists in 1965 at Jesmond where he dismissed the South African skipper Peter van der Merwe lbw for 8 which was his only first-class wicket. He was dismissed by Test left arm spinner Atholl McKinnon in both of his first-class innings for 0 & 2 respectively.

== Retirement ==
Roger Hosen then became master in charge of rugby at Cheltenham College in 1966 and subsequently, to cope with timetable clashes, he moved to Bristol. In the 1980s he retired from teaching and became landlord of the Seven Stars pub in Stithians, still turning out well into his fifties for the local rugby club. He died in Truro on 9 April 2005 aged 72.
