= G. W. Erle Mitchell =

George Wills Erle Mitchell, FRCSEd, (23 November 1943 – 27 January 2003), usually known as Erle Mitchell, was a specialist in obstetrics and gynaecology in Canada and a former Scotland international rugby union player.

== Early life ==
He was born in Edinburgh and went to school at Melville College, where he played rugby for 1st XV, cricket for the 1st XI and hockey for the 1st XI.

== Rugby career ==
While a medical student, Mitchell played for the University of Edinburgh 1st XV and was awarded a rugby blue. He also played for the Scottish Universities team from 1962 to 1966 and British Universities in season 1965-66. In 1967 he played for the Barbarians. He then won 3 full senior caps at second row for Scotland, playing against New Zealand on 2 December 1967, against France on 13 January 1968 and against Wales on 3 February, 1968. The game against New Zealand was memorable because of the sending off of his opposite number Colin Meads, the first sending off in international rugby in the United Kingdom since 1925.

== Surgical career ==
Mitchell graduated MBChB from the University of Edinburgh and gained the Fellowship of the Royal College of Surgeons of Edinburgh (FRCSEd) in 1973. After training posts in Yorkshire he emigrated to Vancouver, Canada. Here he became a specialist in obstetrics and gynaecology and carried out research into ovarian cancer.
