= Christian Carrère =

France international rugby union player

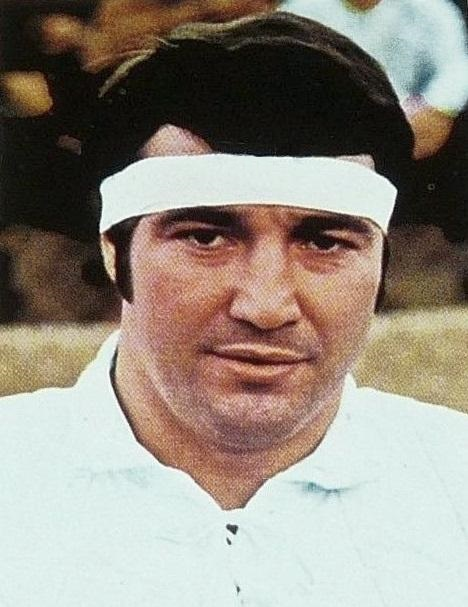
Christian Carrère in 1971

Christian Carrère (born 27 July 1943 in Tarbes), is a former French rugby union player. He played as a flanker.

== Club career ==
He played for Stadoceste Tarbais and for RC Toulonnais, from 1964/65 to 1977/78. He reached the French championship finals in 1968 and 1971 and won the Challenge Yves du Manoir in 1970.

== International career ==
He had 28 caps for France, between 1966 and 1971, and became at the time the youngest team captain, a position he held 18 times. He played his first game on 27 November 1966 against Romania, in Bucharest, in a 9–3 win, and his last on 27 May 1971 against Wales, in Colombes, in a 9–5 loss. He scored 4 tries, 12 points on aggregate, with the team.

He won the 1967 Five Nations Championship, captained the French team to their first ever Grand Slam in 1968 and won it again in 1970, drawing with Wales.

He was selected for the Rest of the World team for the RFU centennial in 1971.

He published his autobiography, with Alain Gex, Carrère par Christian Carrère in 2006.
