= André Campaes =

France international rugby union player

André Campaes (born Lourdes, 30 March 1944) is a former French rugby union player. He played as a wing.

Campaes played all his career at FC Lourdes, where he won the French Championship in 1967/68, and the Challenge Yves du Manoir, in 1966 and 1967.

He had 14 caps for France, from 1965 to 1973, scoring 4 tries, 12 points on aggregate. He played in three Five Nations Championship competitions, in 1965, 1968 and 1969. He was a member of the winning side at the 1968 Five Nations Championship, with a Grand Slam. He was also one of the two top try scorers, with two tries.
