= Robert Wood (rugby union, born 1948) =

- Born: Robert Neil Wood; 6 May 1948 Brisbane, Queensland, Australia

Rugby union career
- Position: lock
International career
Years	Team	Apps	(Points)
1972	Wallabies	1	(0)

Robert Neil Wood (born 6 May 1948) was a rugby union player who represented Australia.

Wood, a lock, was born in Brisbane, Queensland and claimed 1 international rugby cap for Australia.
