= Bryan Palmer =

Australian rugby union footballer and coach

- Born: George Thomas Bryan Palmer; 21 January 1899 Dubbo, New South Wales, Australia
- Died: 19 April 1990 (aged 91) Sydney, New South Wales
- School: Newington College

Rugby union career
- Position: Wing
International career
Years	Team	Apps	(Points)
- Australia

George Thomas Bryan Palmer (21 January 1899 – 19 April 1990) was an Australian rugby union player who coached the Wallabies. He has been described as "one of the most colourful personalities in Australian rugby".

== Early life ==
Palmer was born in Dubbo, New South Wales, the son of T D Palmer, who had played Rugby for the Waratahs in 1899. He played his first Rugby in Dubbo before attending Newington College as a boarder (1915–1916).

== War service ==
Palmer served with the Australian Light Horse in World War I and was invalided home after a bout of near fatal pneumonia. As part of his recovery he joined the Glebe-Balmain Rugby Club to build up his strength and over the ensuing seven seasons played 93 games on the wing.

== Representative rugby ==
His first of seven matches for NSW was played in 1927. Palmer was selected and toured with the Wallabies to New Zealand in 1931 but did not play a match.

== Coach ==
Between 1963 and 1967 he was the coach of the national side, retiring at the age of 68.

== Honours ==
- Palmer Shield - Played for by NSW Primary Schools
- Bryan Palmer Shield - Played for each year by The King's School and Newington College since the centenary of rugby between the two schools in 1970
