= Lilian Camberabero =

France international rugby union player (1937–2015)

Lilian Camberabero (Saubion, 15 July 1937 – Lyon, 29 December 2015) was a French rugby union player. He played as a scrum-half. He was the brother of fellow rugby international player Guy Camberabero.

He played for US Tyrosse, moving afterwards, with his brother Guy Camberabero, to La Voulte, where he played from 1955/56 to 1970/71, and they won the French Championship, in 1969/70.

He had 13 caps for France, from 1963 to 1968, scoring 2 tries and 1 drop goal, 9 points on aggregate. He played in four Five Nations Championship competitions, in 1965, 1966, 1967 and 1968. He was a member of the squad that won the 1968 Five Nations Championship, playing in 3 matches and scoring a try and a drop goal, 6 points on aggregate. It was the last time that he represented his national team.

He and Guy Camberabero wrote the book Le Mot de Passe (1971).

After ending his player career, he became a coach.

He died on 29 December 2015, aged 78, from a liver tumor.
