= Guy Camberabero =

France international rugby union player (1936–2023)

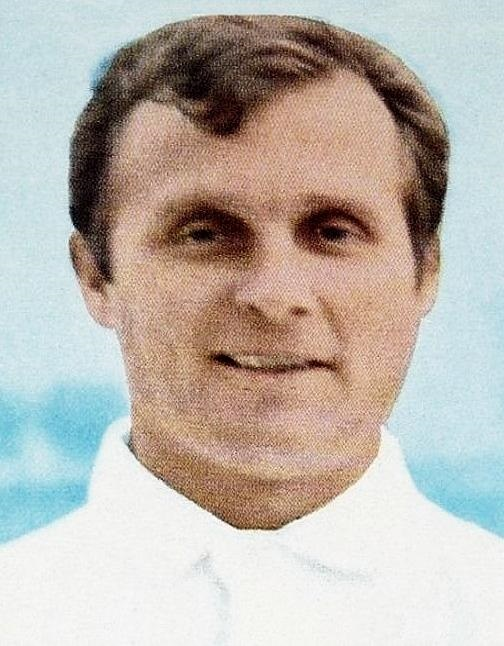
- Camberabero in 1971
- Born: 17 May 1936 Saubion, France
- Died: 26 October 2023 (aged 87) Valence, France
- Height: 5 ft 7 in (1.70 m)
- Weight: 142 lb (64 kg)

Rugby union career
- Position: Flyhalf
Amateur team(s)
Years	Team	Apps	(Points)
–	La Voulte Sportif		
–	US Tyrosse		
International career
Years	Team	Apps	(Points)
1961–1968	France	14	(110)

Guy Camberabero (17 May 1936 – 26 October 2023) was a French rugby union footballer who played as a fly-half.

Camberabero played for La Voulte Sportif (one of the predecessor clubs to today's La Voulte-Valence), where he won the French rugby championship, in 1970, and for US Tyrosse.

Camberabero had 14 caps for France national team, from 1961 to 1968, scoring 2 tries, 19 conversions, 11 penalties and 11 drop goals, 110 points on aggregate. He had his first cap at the 32–3 loss to New Zealand, in Christchurch, at 19 August 1961, in a tour. He was a winner of the 1966–67 FIRA Nations Cup, playing a single game in the 60–13 win over Italy on 13 March 1967, scoring 27 points. He played twice at the Five Nations Championship, in 1967 and 1968. He won the Grand Slam in the 1968 Five Nations Championship. He had his last cap at the 14–9 win over Wales, in Cardiff, at 23 March 1968, in his final presence at the competition.

Camberabero was the brother of fellow rugby player Lilian Camberabero and father of Didier Camberabero.

Camberabero died in Valence, Drôme on 26 October 2023, aged 87, from COVID-19.
