= Doug Rees (rugby union) =

- Full name: Douglas Rees
- Born: 15 January 1944 (age 82) Swansea, Wales

Rugby union career
- Position: Fullback
International career
Years	Team	Apps	(Points)
1968	Wales	3	(9)

Douglas Rees (born 15 January 1944) is a Welsh former international rugby union player.

A goal-kicking fullback, Rees played for Penclawdd, Swansea and Aberavon. He was in a West Wales combined side that pushed the All Blacks close in 1967, with 11-points of his boot, including a successful penalty from the half-way line.

Rees won three caps for Wales in the 1968 Five Nations, debuting against Scotland at home.

== See also ==
- List of Wales national rugby union players
