= Rod Batterham =

Australian rugby union international

- Full name: Roderick Paul Batterham
- Born: 24 November 1947 (age 78) Parramatta, Sydney, Australia

Rugby union career
- Position: Wing
International career
Years	Team	Apps	(Points)
1967–70	Australia	2	(15)

Roderick Paul Batterham (born 24 November 1947) is an Australian former rugby union international.

Batterham was born in Sydney and attended North Sydney Technical High School.

A winger, Batterham was a prolific try scorer and gained his first international cap as a 19-year old in 1967, against the All Blacks in Wellington. He scored all of Australia's nine points, including two tries. Despite an impressive debut, he wasn't capped again until 1970, when he again scored two tries as the Wallabies beat Scotland at the Sydney Cricket Ground. He was however part of four tours with the Wallabies, including an injury disrupted trip to South Africa.

Batterham captained Parramatta to the club's first Shute Shield title in 1977. It was his maiden first-class premiership after playing in seven previous grand finals, three with Gordon, two in Canberra rugby and two with Parramatta.

== See also ==
- List of Australia national rugby union players
