= Ken Oliver (rugby union) =

Scotland international rugby union player

- Full name: George Kenneth Oliver
- Born: 4 March 1946 Galashiels, Scotland
- Died: 22 April 2009 (aged 63) Grantown-on-Spey, Scotland
- School: Galashiels Academy
- University: Edinburgh College of Art
- Occupation: Architect

Rugby union career
- Position: Loose forward
International career
Years	Team	Apps	(Points)
1970	Scotland	1	(0)

George Kenneth Oliver (4 March 1946 — 22 April 2009) was a Scottish international rugby union player.

Born in Galashiels, Oliver attended Galashiels Academy and excelled in middle-distance running events during his youth, before committing solely to rugby when he started playing for Gala at the age of 20.

Oliver, a loose forward, was a noted sevens player for Gala and featured in a side that won 16 successive tournaments. He toured Argentina with Scotland in 1969, but due to a calf injury didn't play against the Pumas. In 1970, Oliver returned for a tour of Australia and made five appearances, including the one-off Test at the Sydney Cricket Ground.

A graduate of the Edinburgh College of Art, Oliver was an architect and had a practice in Dunfermline.

== See also ==
- List of Scotland national rugby union players
