= Barry McDonald (rugby union) =

Australian rugby union player (1940–2020)

- Born: Barry Stuart McDonald; 9 June 1940 Wau, Papua New Guinea
- Died: 1 January 2020 (aged 79)

Rugby union career
- Position: flanker
International career
Years	Team	Apps	(Points)
1969–70	Wallabies	2	(0)

Barry Stuart McDonald (9 June 1940 – 1 January 2020) was a Papua New Guinea-born Australian rugby union player who represented Australia.

McDonald, a flanker, was born in Wau, Papua New Guinea, in the province of Morobe and claimed a total of 2 international rugby caps for Australia.
