= Arthur McGill (rugby union) =

Australian rugby union international

- Full name: Arthur Neil McGill
- Born: 5 December 1944 (age 81) Sydney, Australia
- Died: 9 January 2025 Sydney

Rugby union career
- Position: Fullback
International career
Years	Team	Apps	(Points)
1968–73	Australia	21	(72)

Arthur Neil McGill (born 5 December 1944) is an Australian former rugby union international.

McGill was born in Sydney and attended Drummoyne High School.

A fullback, McGill was a Drummoyne first-grade player and started his Wallabies career in 1968, filling the vacancy brought about by Jim Lenehan's retirement. In his second Test appearance, against the All Blacks at Ballymore, he scored 15 points off his boot to break the Australian individual point scoring record. Despite his record tally, the All Blacks claimed the win with a controversial last minute penalty. He had to withdraw from the squad to tour the British Isles later that year after injuring his knee, but reclaimed his place at fullback to play in 16 successive Test matches from 1969 to 1973. By the end of his 21-Test career, McGill had set a new Wallabies points record (72).

== See also ==
- List of Australia national rugby union players
