= Bruce Taafe =

Australia international rugby union player

- Born: Bruce Stanton Taafe; 13 August 1944 Melbourne, Victoria
- Died: 29 April 2018 (aged 73) Manly, New South Wales, Australia

Rugby union career
- Position: hooker
International career
Years	Team	Apps	(Points)
1969–72	Wallabies	3	(4)

Bruce Stanton Taafe (13 August 1944 – 29 April 2018) was a rugby union player who represented Australia.

Taafe, a hooker, was born in Melbourne, Victoria and claimed a total of 3 international rugby caps for Australia.
