= Jim Roxburgh (rugby union) =

Australian rugby union international (1946–2024)

- Full name: James Russell Roxburgh
- Born: 28 October 1946 Wudinna, South Australia, Australia
- Died: 11 August 2024 (aged 77)

Rugby union career
- Position: Prop
International career
| Years | Team | Apps | (Points) |
| 1968–1970 | Australia | 9 | (0) |

James Russell Roxburgh (28 October 1946 – 11 August 2024) was an Australian rugby union international.

Roxburgh was born in the town of Wudinna, South Australia, and educated in Sydney at The King's School. He played first-grade rugby for Sydney University, earning a blue in 1965.

A prop, Roxburgh was capped nine times for the Wallabies, debuting in 1968 against the All Blacks at the Sydney Cricket Ground. After featuring in all four Tests on the 1969 tour of South Africa, he became outspoken in his opposition to the country's apartheid policy and was among a group of seven Wallabies players who ruled themselves out of potential selection when the Springboks visited Australia two years later.

Roxburgh died on 11 August 2024, five days after collapsing with a brain haemorrhage while riding a stationary bicycle. He was 77. In his later years, Roxburgh had been affected by dementia. He left his brain to the Sydney Brain Bank, which is investigating the traumatic brain injury as a possible cause of the condition.

== See also ==
- List of Australia national rugby union players
