= Mick Barry (rugby union) =

Australia international rugby union player (1943–2020)

- Born: Michael Joseph Barry; 21 October 1943
- Died: 6 November 2020 (aged 77) Currumbin, Queensland
- School: Marist College Ashgrove

Rugby union career
- Position: scrum-half
International career
Years	Team	Apps	(Points)
1971	Australia	1	(0)

Michael Joseph Barry (21 October 1943 – 6 November 2020) was an Australian rugby union player who claimed one international rugby cap for Australia, having also played for Brothers' Rugby Club and the Queensland Reds. After his rugby career ended, a qualified doctor, Barry also worked as an Ear Nose and Throat surgeon in South-East Queensland for several decades. He was also a long-time member of and honorary doctor for the Gold Coast Turf Club, where he was a well-loved local punter.

On 6 November 2020 he drowned after suffering a medical episode while in the sea at Currumbin on Australia's Gold Coast.
