= Brisbane Boys' College =

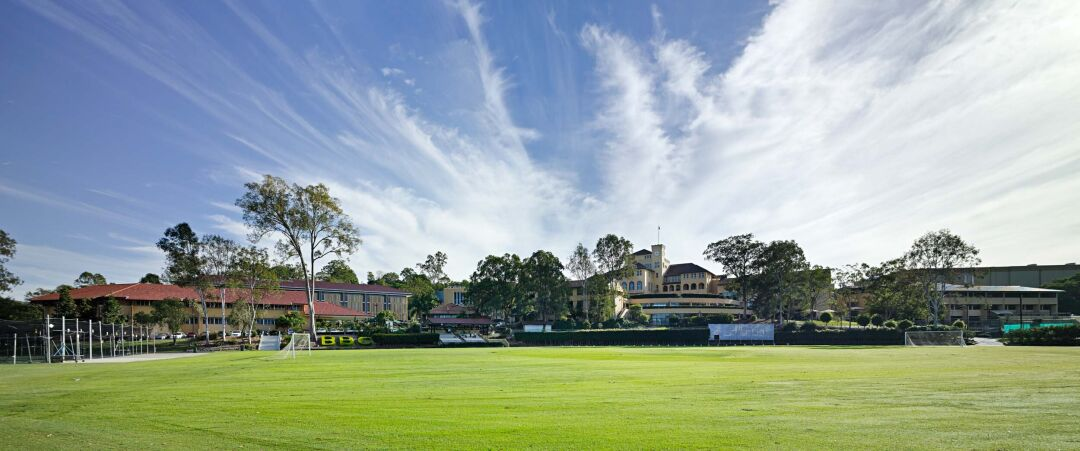
- Brisbane Boys College in 2015

Location
- Toowong, Queensland; Australia; 27°29′17″S 152°59′9″E

Information
- Type: Independent, single-sex, day and boarding
- Motto: Latin: Sit Sine Labe Decus (Let Honour Stainless Be)
- Denomination: Presbyterian and Uniting Church
- Established: 1902
- Headmaster: André Casson
- Employees: ~121
- Enrolment: ~1,550 (P–12)
- Colours: Green, white and black
- Alumni: BBC Old Collegians
- Website: www.bbc.qld.edu.au

Brisbane Boys' College (BBC) is an independent, Presbyterian and Uniting Church, day and boarding school for boys, located in Toowong, a suburb of Brisbane, Queensland, Australia.

Established in 1902, the college has a non-selective enrolment policy and caters for approximately 1,500 students from Prep to 12, including 150 boarders from Years 7 to 12.

Brisbane Boys' College is a school of the Presbyterian and Methodist Schools Association (PMSA), and is affiliated with the Australian Boarding Schools Association (ABSA), the Junior School Heads Association of Australia (JSHAA), and the Association of Heads of Independent Schools of Australia (AHISA). The school is also a founding member of the Great Public Schools' Association Inc (GPS).

Some of the Brisbane Boys' College Buildings are listed on the Queensland Heritage Register and are beloved by its students and the surrounding communities.

== History ==
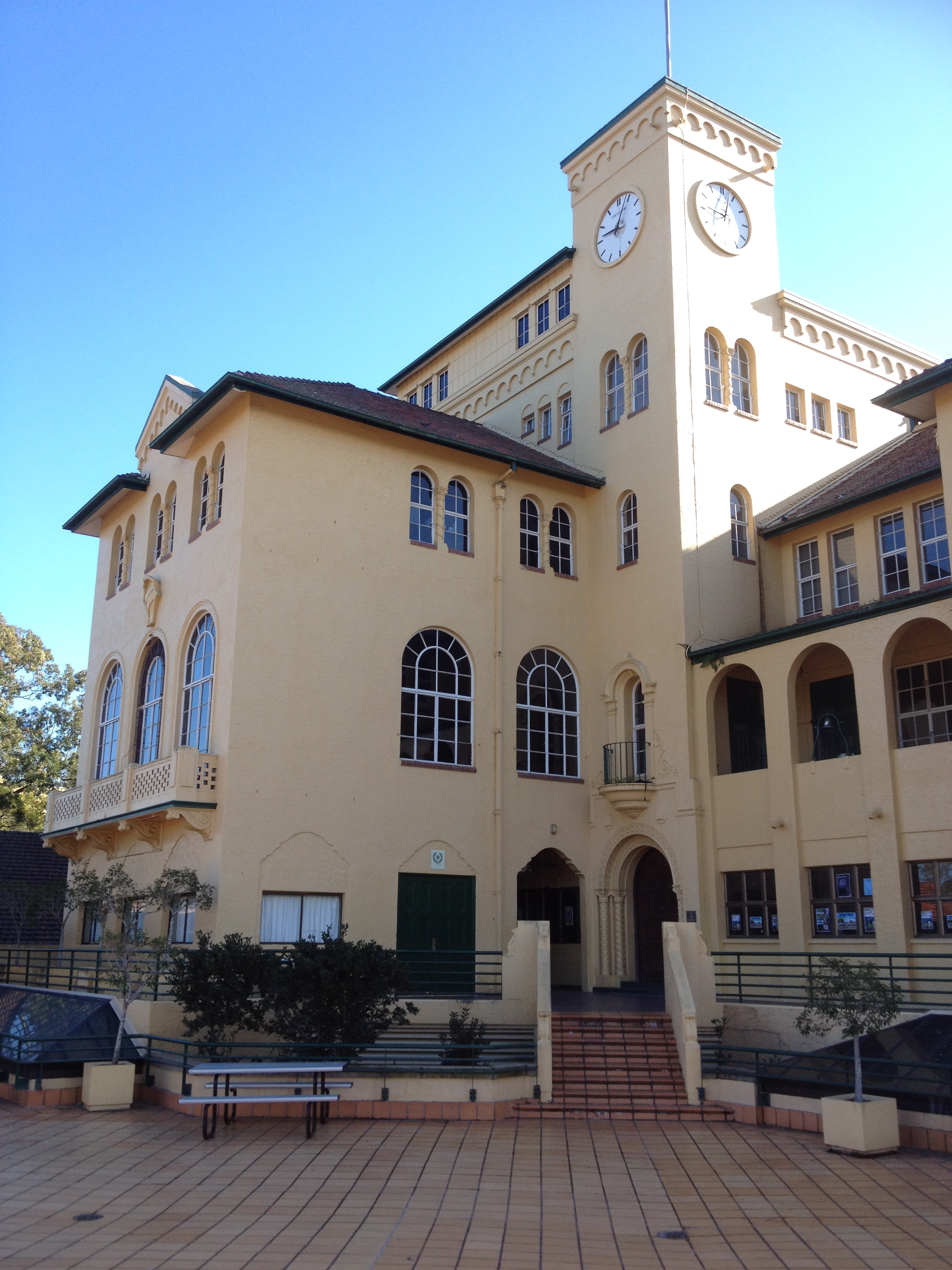
Main Building

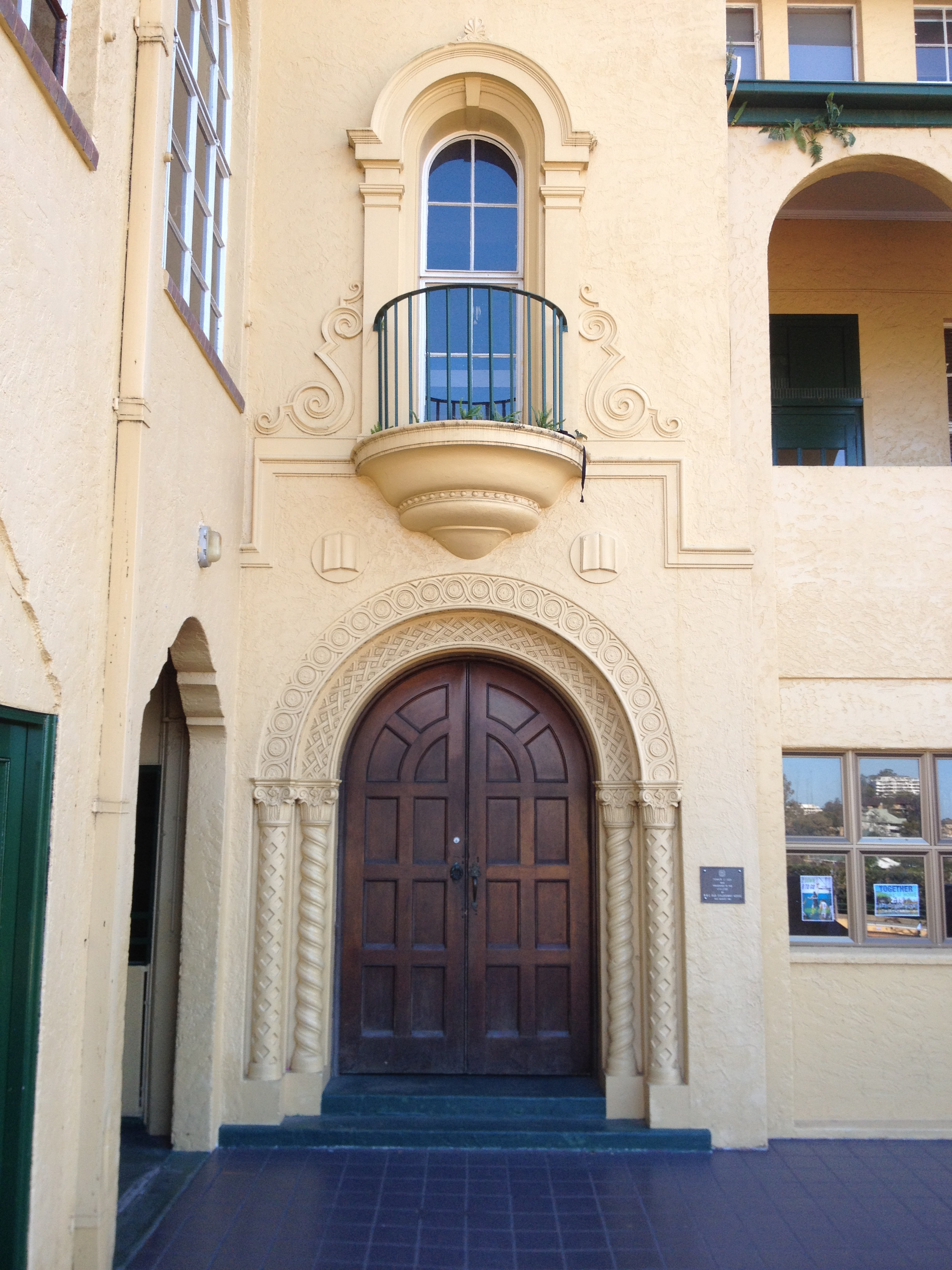

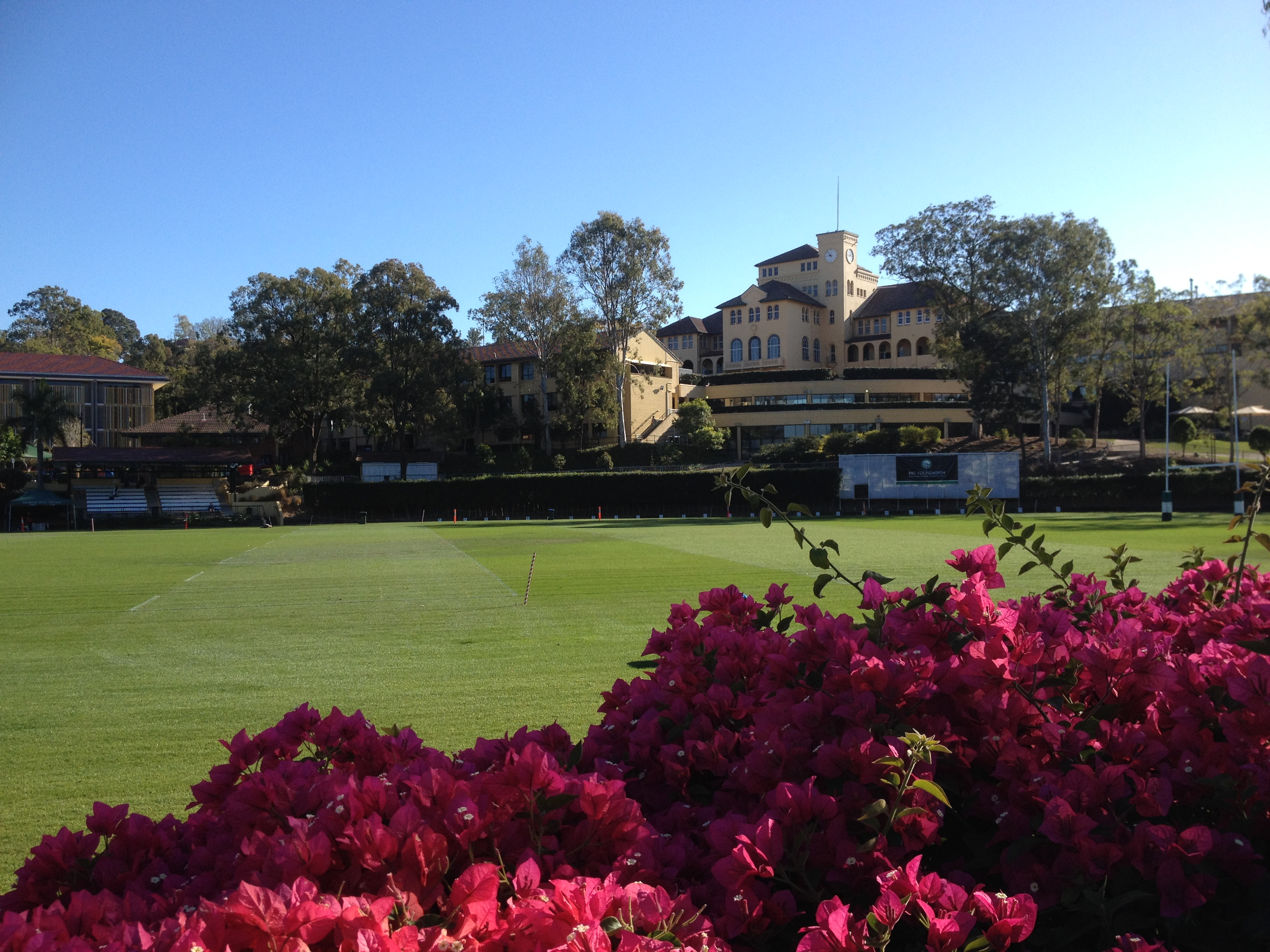

Brisbane Boys' College was established in 1902 by Arthur Rudd. Rudd arrived in Brisbane in 1901 by boat from Melbourne and started a school in Clayfield. The school officially started in March 1902 with just four students.

In 1912, the school moved to a new location on the corner of Bayview Terrace, near the tram terminus, needing more room. Even with the new land, due to space constraints sporting activities were out of the question, so for many years the boys walked to the nearby Kalinga Park. In 1908, there were 80 students and a cadet corps was formed with the impending 1914–1918 war. The school suffered the losses of eight Clayfield Collegians during the war. In 1931, the school was moved, again due to a lack of room for new facilities, to its current site in Toowong with support from its owners, the daughters of the late Premier of Queensland, Sir Robert Philp. The Clayfield campus became a primary school department of Somerville House, which later developed into the independent Clayfield College.

Today BBC is owned by the Presbyterian and Methodist Schools Association, which was formed in 1918, and owns other private schools in Queensland.

== Headmasters ==
Ordinal	Officeholder	Term start	Term end	Time in office	Notes
1	Arthur W. Rudd OBE	1902	1930	27–28 years	
2	Patrick M .Hamilton OBE	1931	1946	14–15 years	
3	Dr Thomas Ross McKenzie OBE	1947	1955	7–8 years	
4	Alfred J. Birtles	1956	1973	16–17 years	
5	Graham E. Thomson AM	1974	1989	14–15 years	
6	Mr George Milton Cujes	1990	1995	4–5 years	
(5)	Graham E. Thomson AM	1996	1996	0 years	
7	Michael G. Norris	1997	2001	3–4 years	
8	Graeme E. McDonald	2002	2017	14–15 years	
9	Paul Brown	2018	2021	2–3 years	
10	André Casson	2022	incumbent	3–4 years	

== Campus ==
BBC's campus is located in the Brisbane suburb of Toowong on land bordered by Moggill Road, Kensington Terrace and Miskin Street, with the main entrance from Kensington Terrace.

The main building dates from the early 1930s, when the school moved to the site, and is characterised by its arches and clock tower in the Mission Revival architecture style. The Rudd and Hamilton wings, built in 1963, form a T-shape extending away from the main building, and the modern glass fronted Resource Centre, built in 1996, fills the quadrant. Other buildings on the site include McKenzie wing (built in 1983), Barbara Helen Thomson Sports Complex (opened in 1987), and the Birtles wing (built in 1973). The main Junior School precinct was completed in early 2008, and a separate building catering exclusively to Prep students was completed in mid 2007. The Junior School precinct was designed in light of the introduction of Years Prep to Grade 3 in 2007. The old college hall (built in 1979) was demolished in late September 2009 and a new college hall was constructed and opened in early June 2011. The present college hall includes an air conditioned auditorium capable of seating 695 people, the Phil Bisset Gallery, and facilities for the music department. In 2014, a new state of the art Middle School precinct was completed, which is situated next to the Junior School buildings.

There are three ovals included within the BBC grounds: the John Noblet Oval, the Parents & Friends Association Oval, and Miskin Oval. BBC also makes use of the Oakman Park ovals, Toowong College (QASMT), University of Queensland and St Lucia, Queensland playing fields. The school plans to build new sporting facilities in a location detached from the main school, possibly in Corinda, though this has sparked local residents' concerns about traffic problems and noise pollution.

In 2022 it was reported that Brisbane Boys' College, in partnership with the Presbyterian Methodist Schools Association, settled on the purchase of the neighbouring 1.23-hectare (3.0-acre) Goldicott, outlying A$17 million.

== House system ==
The school is divided into a house system with ten houses.

The house system was introduced in 1931 by the headmaster at the time Mr Hamilton. The school was divided into 3 Houses – School House (Boarders), Wesley House (Day Boys A–L) and Knox House (Day Boys M–Z).

Due to increasing numbers of boarders School House was sub-divided into Rudd and Campbell House in 1950. However due to boarding numbers once again declining, the two houses were briefly managed together, before the decision was made to continue with only Rudd House for boarders, with Campbell placed in hibernation until 1976, when it was reactivated as a day house. Five new day houses were introduced in 1980, (Flynn, Hamilton, McKenzie and Wheller). Birtles was house was introduced in 1998, and Cole House was introduced in 2020 after the retirement of long time chaplain Reverend Cole the previous year.

House name	Named after	Colours	Introduced
Birtles	Former Headmaster	Azure blue, white, gold	1998
Campbell	Secretary of PMSA in the 1940s	Yellow, black, white	1950
Cole	Former Chaplain Rev'd Graham Cole	Purple, white	2020
Flynn	John Flynn, founder of the Royal Flying Doctor Service	Blue, red	1980
Hamilton	Former Headmaster	Royal blue, black, white	1980
Knox	John Knox, leading Reformer of the Church of Scotland; major influence on Presbyterian churches worldwide	Red, white, black	1931
McKenzie	Former Headmaster	Orange, black	1980
Rudd	Founding Headmaster	Gold, black, green	1950
Wesley	John Wesley, founder of the Methodist Church	Light blue, dark blue, white	1931
Wheller	Long-serving Minister of Albert St Church	Maroon, black, white	1980

== Co-curriculum ==
=== Music ===
The music department hosts string, orchestral and vocal ensembles, as well as concert and stage bands throughout the levels of the school. The school's strings program is among the most prestigious in Queensland. Brisbane Boys' College maintains the tradition of conducting a pipe band, which plays at public events such as the annual ANZAC Day March in Brisbane. The pipe band has also played at the 2018, 2022, and 2024 Royal Edinburgh Military Tattoo in Edinburgh, the special 2019 Sydney Tattoo, and also the 2023 Royal Nova Scotia International Tattoo.

=== Sport ===
The college offers rugby, football, rowing, gymnastics, cricket, basketball, volleyball, chess, tennis, debating, cross-country, Australian rules football, athletics, swimming, waterpolo, golf and sailing.

They have a number of former representative players and coaches as coaches at the college.

- Rugby union first XV head coach: Daniel Leo (rugby union) – former Samoa national rugby union team player
- Rugby union first XV assistant coach: Brad Thorn – former New Zealand national rugby union team player, former Rugby league and Rugby union player
- Rugby union first XV assistant coach: Ben Meehan – former Melbourne Rebels, Melbourne Rising, London Irish, and Gloucester Rugby player
- Cricket first XI head coach: John Buchanan (Australian cricketer) – former Australian national cricket team coach and Queensland Bulls player

==== Recent sporting achievements ====
Brisbane Boys' College has achieved sporting success as a GPS school in the following activities:

- Track and field – 2016, 2017, 2018
- Australian football – 2001, 2003, 2004, 2005, 2009
- Basketball – 1987, 1995, 2005, 2011, 2017
- Cricket – 2003, 2020
- Cross country – 2018, 2019, 2024
- Football – 1991, 1993, 2004, 2010, 2011
- Gymnastics – 1998, 1999, 2000, 2001, 2004, 2007
- Swimming – 2025
- Rowing – 2002, 2003, 2021, 2022, 2023
- Sailing – 2007, 2008, 2011
- Tennis – 2006, 2007, 2008, 2011, 2013, 2014, 2015, 2016, 2017, 2018, 2019, 2020, 2023, 2024, 2025
- Volleyball – 1994, 1995, 1996, 2001, 2019

==== Rowing club ====
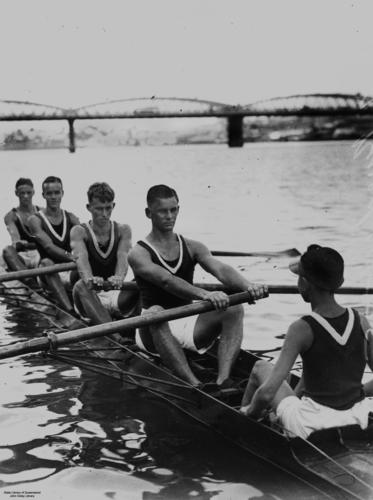
BBC students rowing on the Brisbane River, 1935

The BBC Rowing Club is active throughout the year however the primary season is during terms 1 and 4, and is open to boys in Years 7–12. The boathouse is located on the Brisbane River, near the University of Queensland at St Lucia. The club has been successful since its first race in 1918, winning more Queensland Head of the River races than any other school. The club's most recent wins were in 2002, 2003, 2021, 2022 and 2023.

The club was founded in 1916, by school founder A W Rudd. The first shed was built on Breakfast Creek in 1918, with the club winning its first Head of the River the following year. The shed was moved to the banks of the Brisbane River near the Regatta Hotel in 1930, where it was destroyed by flood in 1974. A new shed was built near the University of Queensland at St Lucia in 1976.

The club is split between quad sculls and eights, with Years 8, 9 and 10 racing quads, with Year 11 and Opens racing eights. The 1st VIII has been successful at the Head of the River on 23 occasions, winning in 1919, 1934, 1937, 1938, 1946, 1947, 1949, 1950, 1951, 1952, 1956, 1957, 1961, 1962, 1965, 1966, 1968, 1972, 1974, 1990, 1992, 1993, 2002, 2021 and 2022. The club's 1st VIII also won the Princess Elizabeth Challenge Cup at the Henley Royal Regatta in 1993, becoming the first Australian crew to do so.

In recent times Brisbane Boys' College rowers have gone on to represent Queensland and Australia in Regattas worldwide. John Dickson (Alumni 2005), Scott Laidler (Alumni 2007), Harrison Westbrook (Alumni 2008) and Cameron Stitt (Alumni 2008) are just some of the examples of old boys who have performed at representative level.

== See also ==
- Lists of schools in Queensland
- List of boarding schools
