= Derek Deans =

- Full name: Derek Thomas Deans
- Born: 30 April 1945 (age 81) Hawick, Scotland
- School: Robert Gordon's College

Rugby union career
- Position: Hooker
International career
Years	Team	Apps	(Points)
1968	Scotland	1	(0)

Derek Thomas Deans (born 30 April 1945) is a Scottish former international rugby union player.

Deans was born in Hawick in the Scottish Borders. His PE master during primary school was BBC commentator Bill McLaren. He later attended Robert Gordon's College in Aberdeen and was a good enough swimmer to win a Scottish Schoolboys freestyle championship, while in his final year he won rugby colours.

A Hawick RFC hooker, Deans received one Scotland cap, playing a 1968 Calcutta Cup match against England at Murrayfield, but was a reserve on numerous others occasions as back up for Frank Laidlaw. He took part in Scotland's 1969 tour of Argentina and also toured South Africa with Scottish Borders. Derek also appeared 4 times for the Barbarians against London Wasps, Cardiff, Swansea and Leicester Tigers. Scoring against Swansea and Wasps.

Deans went on to become President of Hawick RFC in the 1985–86 and 1986–87 seasons.

== See also ==
- List of Scotland national rugby union players
