= Saubion =

- Commune
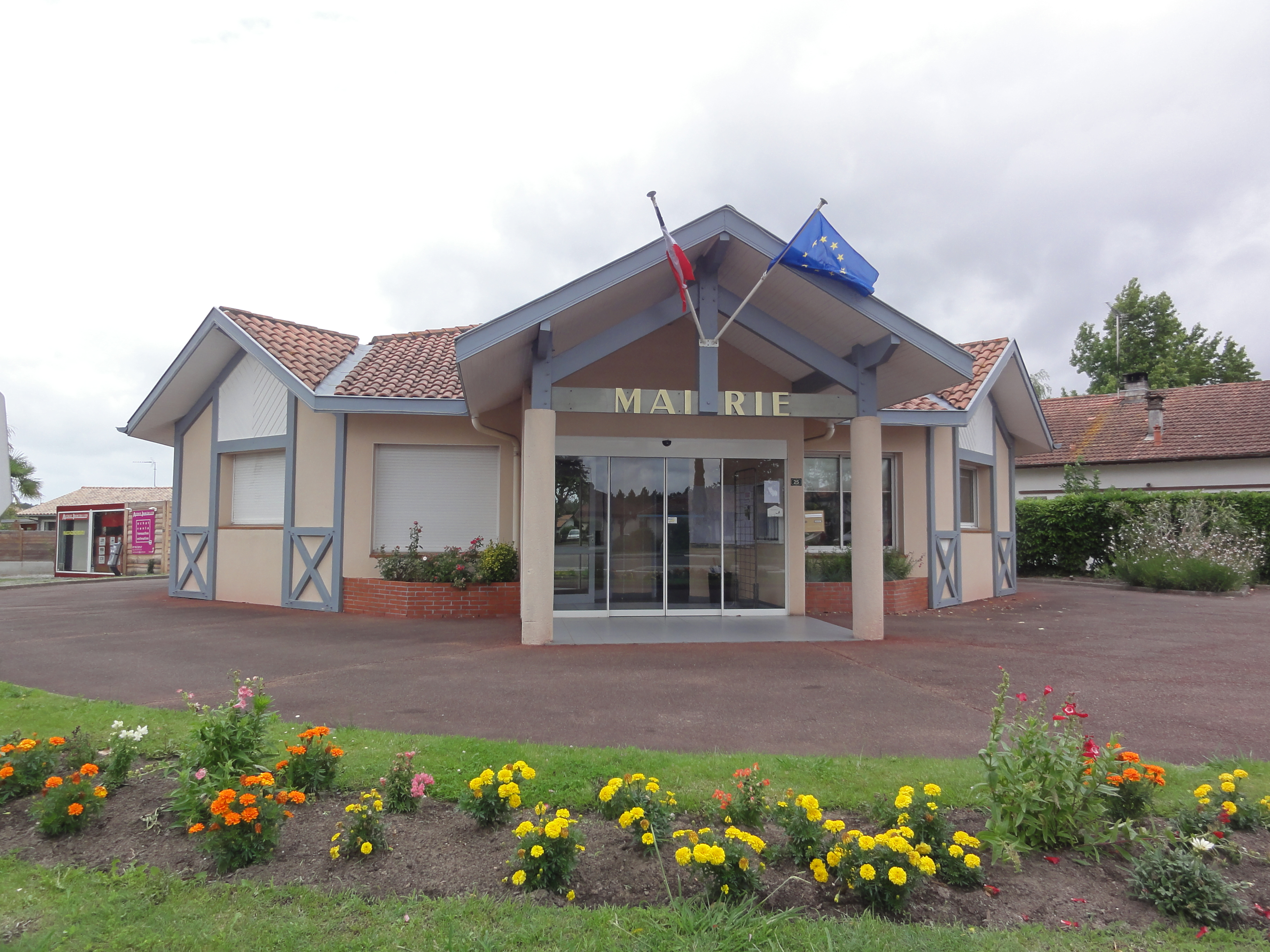
- Town hall
- Location of Saubion
- Location within France Location within Nouvelle-Aquitaine
- Coordinates: 43°40′21″N 1°20′50″W
- Country: France
- Region: Nouvelle-Aquitaine
- Department: Landes
- Arrondissement: Dax
- Canton: Pays Tyrossais
- Intercommunality: Maremne-Adour-Côte-Sud

Government
  - Mayor (2020–2026): Sylvie de Arteche
- Area^{1}: 7.8 km^{2} (3.0 sq mi)
- Elevation: 21 m (69 ft)
- Highest elevation: 38 m (125 ft)
- Lowest elevation: 7 m (23 ft)
- Population (2023): 1,826
  - Density: 230/km^{2} (610/sq mi)
- Time zone: UTC+01:00 (CET)
  - Summer (DST): UTC+02:00 (CEST)
- INSEE/Postal code: 40291 /40230
- ^{1} French Land Register data, which excludes lakes, ponds, glaciers > 1 km^{2} (0.386 sq mi or 247 acres) and river estuaries.

Saubion (French pronunciation: [sobjɔ̃]; Occitan: Sauvion) is a commune in the Landes department in Nouvelle-Aquitaine in southwestern France.

== Population ==
Historical population
Year	Pop.	±% p.a.
1968	445	—
1975	384	−2.08%
1982	507	+4.05%
1990	684	+3.81%
1999	936	+3.55%
2007	1,281	+4.00%
2012	1,381	+1.51%
2017	1,499	+1.65%
2023	1,826	+3.34%
Source: INSEE

== See also ==
- Communes of the Landes department
