= Terry Forman =

- Born: Terrence Robert Forman; January 12, 1948 (age 78)

Rugby union career
- Position: wing
International career
Years	Team	Apps	(Points)
1968	Wallabies	7	(3)

Terrence Robert "Terry" Forman (born 12 January 1948) was a rugby union player who represented Australia.

Forman, a wing, claimed a total of 7 international rugby caps for Australia.
