= John Finlan =

England international rugby union player

- Full name: John Frank Finlan
- Born: 9 September 1941 Warwick, England
- Died: 7 August 2023 (aged 81) Lower Quinton, England

Rugby union career
- Position: Fly-half
International career
Years	Team	Apps	(Points)
1967–73	England	13	(9)

John Frank Finlan (9 September 1941 – 7 August 2023) was an English rugby union international.

Finlan was born in Warwick and attended Saltley Grammar School.

A fly-half, Finlan represented England from 1967 to 1973, gaining a total of 13 caps. He was a Moseley player during his international career but earlier competed for Coventry and Old Saltleians. Only the second North Midlands player to be capped by England, he also had the distinction of setting a new appearance record for the county team in 1973.

== See also ==
- List of England national rugby union players
