= 1968 Five Nations Championship =

Rugby union competition

- Date: 13 January - 23 March 1968
- Countries: England; Ireland; France; Scotland; Wales

Tournament statistics
- Champions: France (5th title)
- Grand Slam: France (1st title)
- Matches played: 10
- Tries scored: 19 (1.9 per match)
- Top point scorer: (England) Bob Hiller (22)
- Top try scorers: (France) André Campaes (2) (Wales) Keri Jones (2)

The 1968 Five Nations Championship was the thirty-ninth series of the rugby union Five Nations Championship. Including the previous incarnations as the Home Nations and Five Nations, this was the seventy-fourth series of the northern hemisphere rugby union championship. Ten matches were played between 13 January and 23 March. It was contested by England, France, Ireland, Scotland and Wales. It marked the first Grand Slam victory for France.

== Participants ==
The teams involved were:

Nation	Venue	City	Head coach	Captain
England	Twickenham	London	none	Colin McFadyean/Mike Weston
France	Stade Olympique Yves-du-Manoir	Colombes	Jean Prat	Christian Carrère
Ireland	Lansdowne Road	Dublin	none	Tom Kiernan
Scotland	Murrayfield	Edinburgh	none	Pringle Fisher/Jim Telfer
Wales	National Stadium	Cardiff	none	Norman Gale/Gareth Edwards/John Dawes

== Table ==
Pos	Team	Pld	W	D	L	PF	PA	PD	Pts
1	France	4	4	0	0	52	30	+22	8
2	Ireland	4	2	1	1	38	37	+1	5
3	England	4	1	2	1	37	40	−3	4
4	Wales	4	1	1	2	31	34	−3	3
5	Scotland	4	0	0	4	18	35	−17	0

== Results ==
1968-01-13

Scotland	6–8	France
Tries: Keith; Pen.: Wilson		Tries: Campaes; Duprat; Con.: G. Camberabero

Murrayfield, Edinburgh
Attendance: 45,000
Referee: K. D. Kelleher (Ireland)

1968-01-20

England	11–11	Wales
Tries: McFadyean; Redwood; Con. Hiller; Pen.: Hiller		Tries: Edwards; Wanbon; Con.: Jarrett; Drops: John

Twickenham, London
Attendance: 70,000
Referee: D. P. d'Arcy (Ireland)

1968-01-27

France	16–6	Ireland
Tries: Campaes; Dauga; Con.: Villepreux (2); Pen.: Villepreux; Drops: Gachassin		Pen.: McCombe (2)

Stade Olympique Yves-du-Manoir, Colombes
Attendance: 28,148
Referee: G. C. Lamb (England)

1968-02-03

Wales	5–0	Scotland
Tries: Jones; Con.: Jarrett

National Stadium, Cardiff
Referee: G. C. Lamb (England)

1968-02-10

England	9–9	Ireland
Pen.: Hiller (2); Drops: Finlan		Pen.: Kiernan (3)

Twickenham, London
Attendance: 70,000
Referee: M. Joseph (Wales)

1968-02-24

France	14–9	England
Tries: Gachassin; Con.: G. Camberabero; Pen.: G. Camberabero; Drops: L. Camberabero; Lacaze		Pen.: Hiller (2); Drops: Weston

Stade Olympique Yves-du-Manoir, Colombes
Attendance: 22,456
Referee: H. B. Laidlaw (Scotland)

1968-02-24

Ireland	14–6	Scotland
Tries: Bresnihan; Duggan (2); Con.: Kiernan; Pen.: Kiernan		Pen.: Wilson (2)

Lansdowne Road, Dublin
Referee: M. Joseph (Wales)

1968-03-09

Ireland	9–6	Wales
Tries: M. Doyle; Pen.: Kiernan; Drops: Gibson		Pen.: Rees; Drops: Edwards

Lansdowne Road, Dublin
Referee: M. H. Titcomb (England)

1968-03-16

Scotland	6–8	England
Pen.: Wilson; Drops: Connell		Tries: Coulman; Con. Hiller; Pen.: Hiller

Murrayfield, Edinburgh
Referee: D. P. d'Arcy (Ireland)

1968-03-23

Wales	9–14	France
Tries: Jones; Pen.: Rees (2)		Tries: L. Camberabero; Carrère; Con.: G. Camberabero; Pen.: G. Camberabero; Drops: G. Camberabero

National Stadium, Cardiff
Attendance: 55,000
Referee: H. B. Laidlaw (Scotland)
