= 1968 South Africa rugby union tour of France =

- Manager: Fritz Eloff
- Coach: Johan Claassen
- Tour captain: Dawie de Villiers
- Top point scorer: Piet Visagie (19)
- Top try scorers: Dawie de Villiers (1); Jannie Engelbrecht (1); Syd Nomis (1)
- Top test point scorer: Piet Visagie (42)
- Top test try scorer: Jannie Engelbrecht (5)
Summary
P	W	D	L
Total
6	5	0	1
Test match
2	2	0	0
Opponent
P	W	D	L
France
2	2	0	0

Tour chronology
- ← Australia and New Zealand 1965 Great Britain and Ireland 1969–70 →

The 1968 South Africa rugby union tour of France was a rugby union tour of France by the South Africa national team in October and November 1968. The tour was South Africa's first sole tour of France, having previously played France on joint-European (Great Britain, Ireland) tours. South Africa's tours of Europe over the previous decades (1906–07, 1912–13, 1931–32, 1951–52, 1960–61, 1965) were extremely successful, holding a win ratio of 88.16%, played across 150 matches.

South Africa won the two-match tour-series 2–0, with both matches being within a five-point margin (20–28 on aggregate). Overall South Africa won five of the six matches on tour.

== Background ==
All of France's three previous victories over South Africa were on South African soil. South Africa's previous match against France on French soil finished 0–0 at the Stade Olympique Yves-du-Manoir in the Paris suburb of Colombes. The tour and two-match series held great significance in that, before the match, France was the only team that South Africa had a negative win ratio against (40%). Every other team, including the British Lions, who had only recently toured South Africa months prior, kept South Africa to a neutral win ratio (New Zealand) or a positive one. Furthermore, although one team (France) kept South Africa to a negative win ratio, no team had a positive win ratio against South Africa, the highest being New Zealand with a win ratio of 42.31%.

South African pre-series record against France
Team	Wins	W%
South Africa	4	40
France	3	30
Draws	3	—
Total	10	

== Fixtures ==
Match	Date	Venue	Home	Score	Away
1	29 October 1968	Stade Mayol, Toulon, Var	Littoral-Provence	3–24	South Africa
2	2 November 1968	Stade de Gerland, Lyon, Rhône	Selection du Sud-Est	0–3	South Africa
3	5 November 1968	Stade Marcel-Michelin, Clermont-Ferrand, Puy-de-Dôme	Selection Auvergne-Centre	10–26	South Africa
4	9 November 1968	Parc Lescure, Bordeaux, Gironde	France	9–12	South Africa
5	11 November 1968	Stade des Ponts Jumeaux, Toulouse, Haute-Garonne	Sud-Ouest XV	11–3	South Africa
6	16 November 1968	Stade Olympique Yves-du-Manoir, Colombes, Hauts-de-Seine	France	11–16	South Africa

== Matches ==
=== First match ===
The first match on the Springbok tour was against a combined team from the South-eastern coastal region of France, with the majority of the team playing with Toulon in the French Championship. South Africa won the match in convincing fashion, scoring six tries to one drop goal.

28 October 1968

Litorral-Provence	3–24	South Africa
Drop: Laborde (1)		Try: Engelbrecht (4); Olivier; Visagie; Con: H. de Villiers (3/6)

Stade Mayol, Toulon
Referee: M. Lebecq (Limousin)

=== Second match ===
2 November 1968

Selection du Sud-Est	0–3	South Africa
		Pen: Naudé (1)

Stade de Gerland, Lyon
Referee: M. K.M. Jones (Wales)

=== Third match ===
5 November 1968

Selection Auvergne-Centre	10–26	South Africa
		Try: Roux; Ellis; Con: Visagie (1/2); Pen: Visagie (5); Drop: Visagie (1/1)

Stade Marcel-Michelin, Clermont-Ferrand
Referee: M. Tyler (England)

=== First test ===
The fourth match, and first test, of the Springbok tour was against France, played in the south-western city of Bordeaux. The story of the match was the missed kicks from South African errors. One try scored by France to three penalty goals kicked via South Africa's Piet Visagie gave the visitors a 3–9 lead at half-time. However, by full-time, although scoring two late tries to bring themselves back into the match (9–12), France had failed to kick seven penalty goals, three conversions, and a drop goal. A total of thirty points. The final score finished France 9, South Africa 12.

9 November 1968

France	9–12	South Africa
Try: Bonal 74' m Dauga (2) ?', 75' m	Report	Pen: Visagie (4/5); Drop: Visagie (0/1)

Parc Lescure, Bordeaux
Attendance: 12,516
Referee: Larry Lamb (England)

FB	15	Henri Magois
RW	14	Jean-Marie Bonal
OC	13	Claude Dourthe
IC	12	Jean-Pierre Lux
LW	11	Pierre Besson
FH	10	Christian Boujet
SH	9	Marcel Puget (c)
N8	8	Walter Spanghero
OF	7	Michel Greffe
BF	6	Claude Chenevay
RL	5	Élie Cester
LL	4	Benoît Dauga
TP	3	Jean Iraçabal
HK	2	Jean-Paul Baux
LP	1	Michel Lasserre
Coach:
Fernand Cazenave

FB	15	HO de Villiers
RW	14	Jannie Engelbrecht
OC	13	Mannetjies Roux
IC	12	Eben Olivier
LW	11	Syd Nomis
FH	10	Piet Visagie
SH	9	Dawie de Villiers (c)
N8	8	Tommy Bedford
OF	7	Jan Ellis
BF	6	Piet Greyling
RL	5	Gawie Carelse
LL	4	Frik du Preez
TP	3	Hannes Marais
HK	2	Gys Pitzer
LP	1	Mof Myburgh
Coach:
Johan Claassen

=== Fourth match ===
11 November 1968

Sud-Ouest XV	11–3	South Africa
Try: Dargelès (1); Con: Michael (1); Pen: Michael (1); Drop: Pariès		Try: Carelse

Stade des Ponts Jumeaux, Toulouse
Referee: M. Birell (Scotland)

=== Second test ===
The sixth match, and final test, of the Springbok tour saw the South Africans play France again, in the Paris commune of Colombes. Trailing 6–3 at half-time, the South Africans fought back early in the second half, scoring three tries to one. South Africa won by five points, and took the series 2–0.

16 November 1968

France	11–16	South Africa
Try: Cester (1); Con: Pariès (1); Drop: Pariès (1); Puget (1)	Report	Try: D. de Villiers; Engelbrecht; Nomis; Con: Visagie (2/3); Pen: Visagie (1)

Stade Olympique Yves-du-Manoir, Colombes
Attendance: 30,000
Referee: Paddy d'Arcy (Ireland)

FB	15	Henri Magois
RW	14	Jean-Pierre Lux
OC	13	Claude Dourthe
IC	12	André Ruiz
LW	11	Jean-Marie Bonal
FH	10	Lucien Pariès
SH	9	Marcel Puget (c)
N8	8	Walter Spanghero
OF	7	Dominique Bontemps
BF	6	Bernard Dutin
RL	5	Élie Cester
LL	4	Benoît Dauga
TP	3	Jean-Michel Esponda
HK	2	Jean-Paul Baux
LP	1	Michel Lasserre
Coach:
Fernand Cazenave

FB	15	HO de Villiers
RW	14	Jannie Engelbrecht
OC	13	Mannetjies Roux
IC	12	Eben Olivier
LW	11	Syd Nomis
FH	10	Piet Visagie
SH	9	Dawie de Villiers (c)
N8	8	Tommy Bedford
OF	7	Jan Ellis
BF	6	Piet Greyling
RL	5	Gawie Carelse
LL	4	Frik du Preez
TP	3	Hannes Marais
HK	2	Gys Pitzer
LP	1	Mof Myburgh
Coach:
Johan Claassen
