= 1968 France rugby union tour of New Zealand and Australia =

In July and August 1968, the French national rugby union team toured New Zealand and Australia. They played three tests against New Zealand and one against Australia, losing all four.

== Results ==
Scores and results list France's points tally first.

	Date	Opponent	Location	Result	Score	Ref.
Match 1	3 July	Marlborough	Lansdowne Park, Blenheim	Lost	19–24	
Match 2	6 July	Otago	Carisbrook, Dunedin	Won	12–6	
Match 3	9 July	Southland	Rugby Park, Invercargill	Won	8–6	
Match 4	13 July	New Zealand	Lancaster Park, Christchurch	Lost	9–12	
Match 5	17 July	Taranaki	Rugby Park, New Plymouth	Won	21–6	
Match 6	20 July	Hawke's Bay	McLean Park, Napier	Won	16–12	
Match 7	23 July	Manawatu	The Showgrounds Oval, Palmerston North	Won	8–3	
Match 8	27 July	New Zealand	Athletic Park, Wellington	Lost	3–9	
Match 9	31 July	King Country	Taumarunui Domain, Taumarunui	Won	23–9	
Match 10	3 August	North Auckland	Okara Park, Whangārei	Won	10–6	
Match 11	6 August	Waikato	Rugby Park, Hamilton	Won	13–8	
Match 13	10 August	New Zealand	Eden Park, Auckland	Lost	12–19	
Match 14	17 August	Australia	SCG, Sydney	Lost	10–11	

== Touring party ==
- Manager: J. C. Bourrier
- Assistant Manager: H. Foures
- Captain: Christian Carrère (Toulon)

=== Full backs ===
Pierre Villepreux (Stade Toulousain), Claude Lacaze (Angoulême)

=== Three-quarters ===
André Campaes (Lourdes), Jean-Marie Bonal (Stade Toulousain), Pierre Besson (Brive), Andre Piazza (Montauban), Claude Dourthe (Dax), Jean Trillo (Begles), Joe Maso (Perpignan), Jean-Pierre Lux (Tyrosse)

=== Half-backs ===
Christian Boujet (Grenoble), Jean Andrieu (Graulhet), Marcel Puget (Brive), Jean-Louis Bérot (Stade Toulousain)

=== Forwards ===
Christian Carrère (Toulon), Jean-Jacques Salut (Toulouse O.E.C), Jean-Claude Olivier (Cognac), Michel Billieres (Stade Toulousain), Alain Plantefol (Agen), Walter Spanghero (Narbonne), Élie Cester (Toulouse O.E.C), Michel Greffe (Grenoble), Benoît Dauga (Mont de Marsan), Jean-Claude Noble (La Voulte), Jean-Claude Berejnoi (Tuille), Jean-Michel Esponda (Perpignan), Jean Iraçabal, Michel Lasserre (Agen), Jean-Paul Baux (Lannemezan), Michel Yachvili (Tulle)
