= History of rugby union matches between France and South Africa =

The national rugby union teams of France and South Africa (the Springboks) have been playing each other in Test rugby since 1913. Their first meeting, held in Bordeaux, was on 11 January 1913, and was won 38–5 by South Africa.

== Rugby World Cup ==
France and South Africa have met twice in the Rugby World Cup, both in the knockout stages, and both being hard-fought games with close results. South Africa has won both meetings, and went on to win the cup on both occasions. In the 1995 Rugby World Cup held in South Africa, they met in the semifinal, with South Africa winning 19–15 in the rain.

In the 2023 Rugby World Cup held in France, South Africa met France in the quarterfinals, with South Africa winning 29–28 in what is regarded as one of the greatest matches in World Cup history.

== Summary ==
=== Overall ===
Details	Played	Won by France	Won by South Africa	Drawn	France points	South Africa points
In France	24	7	16	1	395	498
In South Africa	24	6	13	5	363	547
Overall	48	13	29	6	758	1045

=== Records ===
Note: Date shown in brackets indicates when the record was or last set.

Record	France	South Africa
Longest winning streak	3 (26 November 2005 – 12 June 2010)	7 (12 June 2010 – 12 November 2022)
Largest points for
Home	32 (15 November 1997)	42 (12 June 2010)
Away	36 (24 June 2006)	52 (22 November 1997)
Largest winning margin
Home	20 (9 November 2002)	25 (12 June 2010)
Away	10 (24 June 2006)	42 (22 November 1997)
Largest aggregate score
68 (France 32–36 South Africa) (15 November 1997)

== Results ==
No.	Date	Venue	Score	Winner	Competition
1	11 January 1913	Parc Lescure, Bordeaux	5–38	South Africa	1912–13 South Africa tour of Great Britain, Ireland and France
2	16 February 1952	Stade Olympique Yves-du-Manoir, Colombes	3–25	South Africa	1951–52 South Africa tour of Great Britain, Ireland and France
3	26 July 1958	Newlands Stadium, Cape Town	3–3	draw	1958 France tour of South Africa and Southern Rhodesia
4	16 August 1958	Ellis Park Stadium, Johannesburg	5–9	France	1958 France tour of South Africa and Southern Rhodesia
5	18 February 1961	Stade Olympique Yves-du-Manoir, Colombes	0–0	draw	1960–61 South Africa tour of Great Britain, Ireland and France
6	25 July 1964	Pam Brink Stadium, Springs	6–8	France	1964 France tour of South Africa and Southern Rhodesia
7	15 July 1967	Kings Park Stadium, Durban	26–3	South Africa	1967 France tour of South Africa and Rhodesia
8	22 July 1967	Free State Stadium, Bloemfontein	16–3	South Africa	1967 France tour of South Africa and Rhodesia
9	29 July 1967	Ellis Park Stadium, Johannesburg	14–19	France	1967 France tour of South Africa and Rhodesia
10	12 August 1967	Newlands Stadium, Cape Town	6–6	draw	1967 France tour of South Africa and Rhodesia
11	9 November 1968	Parc Lescure, Bordeaux	9–12	South Africa	1968 South Africa tour of France
12	16 November 1968	Stade Olympique Yves-du-Manoir, Colombes	11–16	South Africa	1968 South Africa tour of France
13	12 June 1971	Free State Stadium, Bloemfontein	22–9	South Africa	1971 France tour of South Africa
14	19 June 1971	Kings Park Stadium, Durban	8–8	draw	1971 France tour of South Africa
15	23 November 1974	Stadium Municipal, Toulouse	4–13	South Africa	1974 South Africa tour of France
16	30 November 1974	Parc des Princes, Paris	8–10	South Africa	1974 South Africa tour of France
17	21 June 1975	Free State Stadium, Bloemfontein	38–25	South Africa	1975 France tour of South Africa
18	28 June 1975	Loftus Versfeld Stadium, Pretoria	33–18	South Africa	1975 France tour of South Africa
19	8 November 1980	Loftus Versfeld Stadium, Pretoria	37–15	South Africa	1980 France tour of South Africa
20	17 October 1992	Stade de Gerland, Lyon	15–20	South Africa	1992 South Africa tour of England and France
21	24 October 1992	Parc des Princes, Paris	29–16	France	1992 South Africa tour of England and France
22	26 June 1993	Kings Park Stadium, Durban	20–20	draw	1993 France tour of South Africa
23	3 July 1993	Ellis Park Stadium, Johannesburg	17–18	France	1993 France tour of South Africa
24	17 June 1995	Kings Park Stadium, Durban	19–15	South Africa	1995 Rugby World Cup
25	30 November 1996	Parc Lescure, Bordeaux	12–22	South Africa	1996 South Africa tour of Argentina and Europe
26	7 December 1996	Parc des Princes, Paris	12–13	South Africa	1996 South Africa tour of Argentina and Europe
27	15 November 1997	Stade de Gerland, Lyon	32–36	South Africa	1997 South Africa tour of Great Britain, France and Italy
28	22 November 1997	Parc des Princes, Paris	10–52	South Africa	1997 South Africa tour of Great Britain, France and Italy
29	16 June 2001	Ellis Park Stadium, Johannesburg	23–32	France	2001 France tour of South Africa and New Zealand
30	23 June 2001	Kings Park Stadium, Durban	20–15	South Africa	2001 France tour of South Africa and New Zealand
31	10 November 2001	Stade de France, Saint-Denis	20–10	France	2001 South Africa tour of Europe and the United States
32	9 November 2002	Stade Vélodrome, Marseille	30–10	France	2002 end-of-year rugby union internationals
33	18 June 2005	Kings Park Stadium, Durban	30–30	draw	2005 France tour of Australia and South Africa
34	25 June 2005	Boet Erasmus Stadium, Port Elizabeth	27–13	South Africa	2005 France tour of Australia and South Africa
35	26 November 2005	Stade de France, Saint-Denis	26–20	France	2005 end-of-year rugby union tests
36	24 June 2006	Newlands Stadium, Cape Town	26–36	France	2006 June International
37	13 November 2009	Stadium Municipal, Toulouse	20–13	France	2009 end-of-year rugby union tests
38	12 June 2010	Newlands Stadium, Cape Town	42–17	South Africa	2010 June International
39	23 November 2013	Stade de France, Saint-Denis	10–19	South Africa	2013 end-of-year rugby union tests
40	10 June 2017	Loftus Versfeld Stadium, Pretoria	37–14	South Africa	2017 France tour of South Africa
41	17 June 2017	Kings Park Stadium, Durban	37–15	South Africa	2017 France tour of South Africa
42	24 June 2017	Ellis Park Stadium, Johannesburg	35–12	South Africa	2017 France tour of South Africa
43	18 November 2017	Stade de France, Saint-Denis	17–18	South Africa	2017 end-of-year rugby union internationals
44	10 November 2018	Stade de France, Saint-Denis	26–29	South Africa	2018 end-of-year rugby union internationals
45	12 November 2022	Stade Vélodrome, Marseille	30–26	France	2022 end-of-year rugby union internationals
46	15 October 2023	Stade de France, Saint-Denis	28–29	South Africa	2023 Rugby World Cup
47	8 November 2025	Stade de France, Saint-Denis	17–32	South Africa	2025 end-of-year rugby union internationals
48	14 November 2026	Stade de France, Saint-Denis	21–19	France	2026 Nations Championship

== List of series ==
Played	Won by France	Won by South Africa	Drawn
13	2	9	2

Year	France	South Africa	Series winner
1958	1	0	France (Note: The two-match series was won by France as one of the matches was won by France; with one being drawn.)
1967	1	2	South Africa (Note: The matches played between the teams on the tour-series was played four times, with one fixture being a draw.)
1968	0	2	South Africa
1971	0	1	South Africa (Note: One match was drawn, the other was won by South Africa.)
1974	0	2	South Africa
1975	0	2	South Africa
1992	1	1	draw
1993	1	0	France
1996	0	2	South Africa
1997	0	2	South Africa
2001	1	1	draw
2005	0	1	South Africa (Note: The two-match series was won by South Africa as one of the matches was won by South Africa; with one being drawn.)
2017	0	3	South Africa
