= Piet van Deventer =

South African rugby union player

- Full name: Pieter Ignatius van Deventer
- Born: 6 June 1946 Krugersdorp, South Africa
- Died: 16 March 2013 (aged 66) Krugersdorp, South Africa
- Height: 6 ft (183 cm)
- Weight: 14 st 1 lb (197 lb; 89 kg)

Rugby union career
- Position: Flanker
Provincial / State sides
Years	Team	Apps	(Points)
1966–74	Griqualand West	55	
International career
Years	Team	Apps	(Points)
1969–70	South Africa		

Pieter Ignatius van Deventer (6 June 1946 – 16 March 2013) was a South African international rugby union player.

Born in Krugersdorp, Transvaal, van Deventer attended school in Barkly East and briefly served as a police officer, before picking up work at a manganese mine in Griqualand West, and later the West Rand mines of Western Transvaal.

Primarily an open–side flanker, van Deventer made his representative debut for Griqualand West aged 19. He represented the Springboks in 12 uncapped matches on their 1969–70 tour of Britain and Ireland, but couldn't dislodge Jan Ellis or Piet Greyling for any of the internationals. In the only match a place became vacant, against England, the selectors opted to give a debut to Albie Bates. He was a member of the Griqualand West team which won the 1970 Currie Cup final over Northern Transvaal in Kimberley and finished his career representing Western Transvaal.

== See also ==
- List of South Africa national rugby union players
