= Syd Nomis =

South African rugby union player

- Born: Sydney Harold Nomis; 15 November 1941 Johannesburg, South Africa
- Died: 16 June 2018 (aged 76) Johannesburg, South Africa
- Height: 1.78 m (5 ft 10 in)
- Weight: 79.38 kg (12 st 7.0 lb)

Rugby union career
- Position(s): Wing, Centre
Amateur team(s)
| Years | Team | Apps | (Points) |
- Wanderers RFC, Johannesburg
Provincial / State sides
| Years | Team | Apps | (Points) |
| 1963–74 | Transvaal | 54 | |
International career
| Years | Team | Apps | (Points) |
| 1967–72 | South Africa | 25 | (18) |

Syd Nomis

Sydney Nomis (15 November 1941 – 16 June 2018) was a South African national rugby union player who until 2001 held the record for most consecutive matches (25) played for the Springboks. Nomis is best remembered for tries that he scored against France in 1968 and the All Blacks in 1970.

Along with Okey Geffin, Nomis is considered one of the greatest Jewish rugby players of all time, and is a member of the International Jewish Sports Hall of Fame. He was inducted in 1999.

== Early career ==
Nomis played club rugby for Wanderers in Johannesburg. He revealed that while playing club rugby he also occasionally received slurs, with opponents calling him a "Blerrie Jood" [Afrikaans for "Bloody Jew"]. Nomis remembered injuring one such player to the extent that he had to be carried off the field. "If you played rugby then, that was how it was played, there was no other way ... club rugby was almost harder than international rugby." Nomis said that he only experienced anti-Semitism at club level. But "after the game we would have a beer together and we would be big mates." And national rugby official Danie Craven at the time believed that selecting a Jew and a policeman brought luck to the Springbok team.

In 1961, and again in 1962, Nomis was selected to play for the Quaggas, an invitational South African team styled after the Barbarians. He spent his provincial rugby career at the Transvaal Rugby Union, for whom he was first selected in 1963.

== Springbok career ==
=== Uncapped tours ===
Nomis played 29 uncapped matches on tours with national sides, including the 1965 Springbok tours to Australia and New Zealand, and the 1966 Gazelles outing to Argentina (which included a game against Chile).

In 1965 Nomis was selected at centre alongside John Gainsford for the side that left for Australia under coach Johan Claassen. The Melbourne newspaper The Age was impressed with Nomis' and Gainsford's "incredible acceleration" during a 52–6 Springbok victory over Victoria at Olympic Park's no. 2 oval on 12 June. Apart from a solitary win against New Zealand, the Springboks lost five out of six test matches on the rain-sodden tour, and was judged by The New Zealand Herald's Terry McLean to be the worst South African team to face the All Blacks. Matters were not helped by South African prime minister H F Verwoerd's announcement during the tour that Māoris would not be allowed to play in South Africa if selected for the 1967 All Black tour to that country.

In 1966 Nomis was chosen to represent a South African under-25 side known as the Gazelles on their tour to Argentina. He did not play in the two "tests" against the Argentinian national side, but did score 5 tries in 7 other matches, including two against Cordoba on 24 August.

=== Test matches ===
In addition to his uncapped matches, Nomis was capped 25 times for a total of 54 appearances in the green and gold. Although selected 22 times for the Springboks on the wing, Nomis' first three test appearances were at centre.

For his debut test against France at Newlands Stadium in Cape Town on 12 August 1967, Nomis was chosen at centre – a position he retained for three consecutive tests. The French tour was organized by Danie Craven, then-President of the South African Rugby Union, to replace a New Zealand tour, which had been cancelled by New Zealand after the South African government refused to allow Māori members entry. The French were Five Nations champions that year. Nomis replaced centre John Gainsford, who had occupied the position for 33 tests between 1960 and 1967. Gainsford sent him a telegram that read: " 'Like I’m sad man – like I’m glad man – play well. John Gainsford' ".

For the first test at Newlands on 13 July 1968 against Tom Kiernan's touring British and Irish Lions he was switched to wing, where he played for the rest of his international career.

Nomis was selected for what became known as the Springbok "demo tour" of 1969 to 1970 to the United Kingdom. Continuous disruptions on and off the field by thousands of anti-apartheid demonstrators and associated strikes of service personnel created constant tension within the touring party. These protests were part of a global movement organized by South Africans like Peter Hain and Dennis Brutus to isolate South Africa's all-white sports teams due to their racial selection policies.

Nomis fainted at an after-match reception at the Angel Hotel in Cardiff and was hospitalized for a night. His wife was pregnant at the time. " 'You never knew if there might be a guy in the stands with a gun or something, it was frightening. You think, ‘Jeez am I going to get home to see my firstborn?' " During the subsequent tour by the All Blacks to South Africa in the last half of 1970, Nomis tried to let the New Zealand players know that he did not vote for the apartheid government.

=== Two famous tries ===
Nomis scored one of his six test career tries against the French on a cold 16 November 1968 at the Stade Olympique Yves-du-Manoir in Colombes, northwest of Paris. Before 24,000 spectators Nomis helped his team beat France 16–11 by virtually crawling "across the tryline to score". The try came after Mannetjies Roux was tackled and Nomis kicked the loose ball into the in-goal area. As he ran to dot down, his legs cramped and he fell down. After repeatedly falling down from cramp and getting up again, he managed to score the try. He later discovered that in commentary on the match South African radio broadcaster Charles Fortune had credited Roux with the try.

Afrikaans commentator Gerhard Viviers describes Syd Nomis' 1970 try in the first test against the All Blacks.

During the first test on 25 July 1970 against the All Blacks at Loftus Versfeld Stadium, Nomis scored the try most often associated with him. Intercepting a pass from All Black Wayne Cottrell to his captain, Brian Lochore, Nomis raced down the field, accompanied by the passionate shouting of "Siddie! Siddie! Siddie! And he scores!" by Afrikaans radio commentator Gerhard Viviers. Former Springbok captain Morne du Plessis later thanked Viviers for the " 'try you and Syd Nomis scored' ". The Springbok side won the test 17–6.

=== The McCormick incident ===
On 8 August 1970 at Newlands in the second test against the touring side Nomis was felled by All Black fullback Fergie McCormick. Nomis had kicked the ball over McCormick's head and tried to run around him. McCormick spun around and hit Nomis in the mouth with his elbow, knocking out two teeth and loosening several others. Referee Wynand Malan, a dentist, straightened Nomis' teeth on the field. Although he had lost consciousness briefly, Nomis stayed on to finish the game with a bleeding mouth. He later described the test as " 'the dirtiest game of rugby I have ever seen or been involved in' ".

The Johannesburg newspaper The Sunday Times claimed that film of the clash showed it to be accidental. Nomis still dismisses the claim, pointing out that in McCormick's autobiography the fullback said that he would have done anything to stop Nomis. McCormick was "one of the dirtiest rugby players I ever played against," Nomis said in a 2008 interview.

The Springboks targeted McCormick in the third test, played at Boet Erasmus Stadium in Port Elizabeth (Gqeberha). Nomis kicked the ball high towards McCormick, and "Jan Ellis, Piet Greyling and Hannes Marais all hit him at the same time", recalled Nomis. He and McCormick also came to blows, with Nomis punching McCormick several times before being stopped by the referee. At the cocktail reception after the game the referee asked Nomis: " 'Did I give you enough time?' ".

For the fourth test Nomis was provided with a gum guard to protect his damaged teeth, which had been reinserted into his mouth. For this reason Nomis believes that he may have pioneered the use of gum guards by rugby players.

Nomis' last international game, at the age of 30, was against England at Ellis Park Stadium, Johannesburg. During his career Nomis was offered contracts to play rugby league with Wigan (where his wife's parents lived) and Oldham. Nomis said that Wigan's offer was "half-hearted", while Oldham would not agree to his financial terms and so their offer collapsed.

=== International caps ===
| Opposition | Result | Position | Tries | Date | Venue |
|---|---|---|---|---|---|
| France | 6–6 | Outside Centre | | 12 August 1967 | Newlands Stadium, Cape Town |
| British and Irish Lions | 25–20 | Outside Centre | | 8 June 1968 | Loftus Versfeld Stadium, Pretoria |
| British and Irish Lions | 6–6 | Outside Centre | | 22 June 1968 | Boet Erasmus Stadium, Port Elizabeth |
| British and Irish Lions | 11–6 | Left wing | | 13 July 1968 | Newlands Stadium, Cape Town |
| British and Irish Lions | 19–6 | Left wing | 1 | 27 July 1968 | Ellis Park Stadium, Johannesburg |
| France | 12–9 | Left wing | | 9 November 1968 | Stade Municipal, Bordeaux |
| France | 16–11 | Left wing | 1 | 16 November 1968 | Stade Olympique Yves-du-Manoir, Paris |
| Australia | 30–11 | Left wing | 2 | 2 August 1969 | Ellis Park Stadium, Johannesburg |
| Australia | 16–9 | Left wing | | 16 August 1969 | Kings Park Stadium, Durban |
| Australia | 11–3 | Left wing | | 6 September 1969 | Newlands Stadium, Cape Town |
| Australia | 19–8 | Left wing | | 20 September 1969 | Free State Stadium, Bloemfontein |
| Scotland | 3–6 | Right wing | | 6 December 1969 | Murrayfield, Edinburgh |
| England | 8–11 | Right wing | | 20 December 1969 | Twickenham Stadium, London |
| Ireland | 8–8 | Right wing | | 10 January 1970 | Lansdowne Rd, Dublin |
| Wales | 6–6 | Right wing | 1 | 24 January 1970 | Cardiff Arms Park Cardiff |
| New Zealand | 17–6 | Right wing | 1 | 25 July 1970 | Loftus Versfeld Stadium, Pretoria |
| New Zealand | 8–9 | Right wing | | 8 August 1970 | Newlands Stadium, Cape Town |
| New Zealand | 14–3 | Right wing | | 29 August 1970 | Boet Erasmus Stadium, Port Elizabeth |
| New Zealand | 20–17 | Right wing | | 12 September 1970 | Ellis Park Stadium, Johannesburg |
| France | 22–9 | Right wing | | 12 June 1971 | Free state stadium, Bloemfontein |
| France | 8–8 | Right wing | | 19 June 1971 | Kings Park Stadium, Durban |
| Australia | 19–11 | Right wing | | 17 July 1971 | Sydney Cricket Ground, Sydney |
| Australia | 14–6 | Right wing | | 31 July 1971 | Brisbane Exhibition Ground, Brisbane |
| Australia | 18–6 | Right wing | | 7 August 1971 | Sydney Cricket Ground, Sydney |
| England | 9–18 | Right wing | | 3 June 1972 | Ellis Park Stadium, Johannesburg |

== Honours ==
Transvaal

- Currie Cup: 1972

== Later life ==
After retiring from rugby Nomis worked in the clothing industry for twenty years before switching to the security industry.

During a visit to Switzerland in September 2010, Nomis developed life-threatening blood clots in his left leg, which had to be amputated above the knee.

Nomis died as the result of a heart attack on 16 June 2018 in Johannesburg.

== See also ==
- List of select Jewish rugby union players
