= 1966 South African Gazelles rugby union tour in Argentina =

Summary
P	W	D	L
Total
13	13	0	0
Test match
3	3	0	0
Opponent
P	W	D	L
Chile
1	1	0	0
Argentina
2	2	0	0

The 1966 South African Gazelles tour in Argentina was a series of rugby union matches played in Argentina and in Chile in 1966.

It was the third tour of a South African representative team to Argentina, after the two Junior Springboks tours in 1932 and 1959.

The "Gazelles" were a team of developing players in the Under-23 age group, selected by the South African Rugby Union.

== Match summary ==
Complete list of matches played by the South Africa u24 in Argentina:

indicates matches v national teams (senior squads)

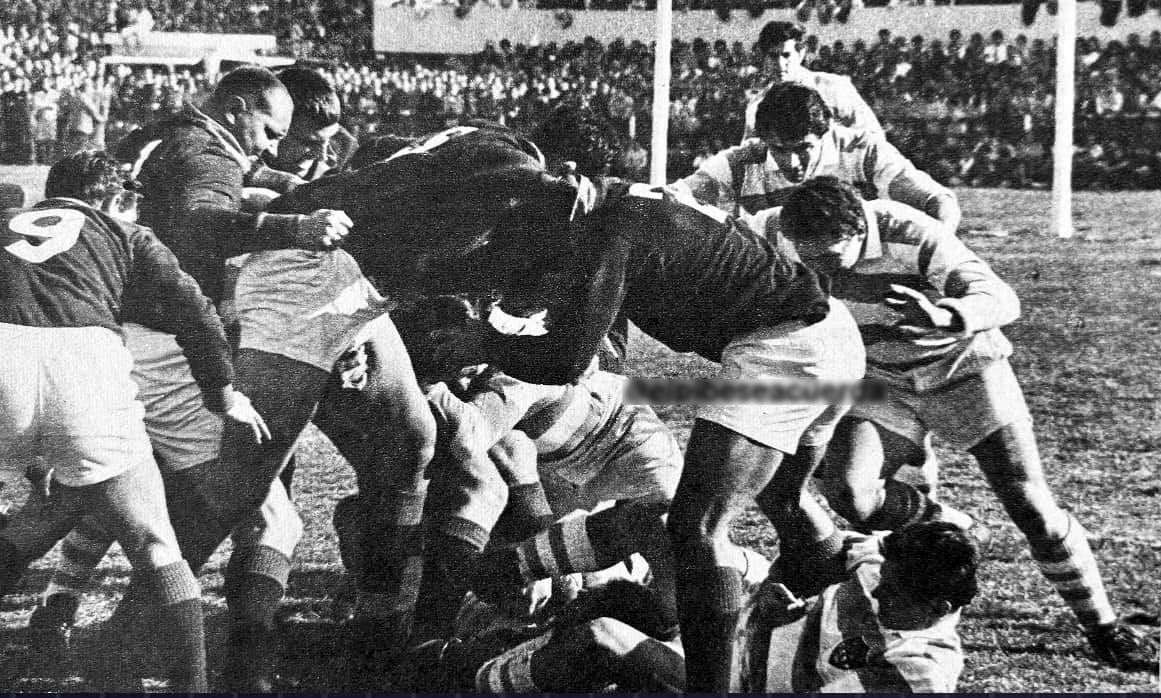
One of the two matches played v Argentina at GEBA

#	Date	Rival	City	Venue	Score
1	20 Aug	Chile	Santiago	Stade Francais	73–3
2	24 Aug	Córdoba RU	Córdoba	Córdoba A.C.	69–8
3	27 Aug	Rosario RU	Rosario	Plaza Jewell	32–6
4	31 Aug	Tucumán RU	S.M. Tucumán	?	80–3
5	3 Sep	Seleccionado del Interior	Buenos Aires	Estadio GEBA	28–0
6	7 Sep	Mar del Plata RU	Mar del Plata	Parque Camet	85–3
7	10 Sep	Second Division XV	Buenos Aires	Estadio GEBA	60–6
8	14 Sep	CA San Isidro	Buenos Aires	Estadio GEBA	37–0
9	17 Sep	Argentina B	Buenos Aires	Estadio GEBA	29–6
10	21 Sep	Belgrano A.C.	Buenos Aires	Estadio GEBA	19–3
11	24 Sep	Argentina	Buenos Aires	Estadio GEBA	9–3
12	28 Sep	Club Universitario BA	Buenos Aires	Estadio GEBA	29–0
13	1 Oct	Argentina	Buenos Aires	Estadio GEBA	20–15

Balance
Pl	W	D	L	PS	PC
13	13	0	0	570	56

== Match details ==
=== Chile ===
20 August 1966

Chile	3–73	Gazelles

Club Stade Français, Santiago

Team details

Chile
Gazzelles

=== Argentina ===
24 August 1966

Córdoba	8–69	Gazelles
Try: penalty try Con: Mezquida; Pen: Mezquida		Try: Ellis 4, Du Pisanie 2, Nomis 2, Meiring 2, De Villiers, Bennet, Court; Con: Pretorius 12; Pen: Pretorius 2

Córdoba A.C., Córdoba
Referee: Lucas Glastra (Buenos Aires)

Unión Cordobesa: F. Mezquida; L. Rodríguez, J. Mancini, E. Quetglas, E. Mulle; M. Olmedo Arana, J. Del Valle; P. Demo, J. Masjoan, R. Carballo; J. Imaz (capt.), E. Corne¬lla; G. Ribetea, C. Félix, J. Coceo.
Gazelles: A. Pretorius; P. Court, S. Nomis, J. Bennet, B. Meiring; J. Barnard, D. de Villiers (capt); C. Du Pisanie, J. Wilkens, J. Ellis; E. Carelse, J. Swart; B. Alberts, G. Pitzer, G. Kotze |}

27 August 1966

Rosario	6–32	Gazelles
Pen: Caballero, J. Seaton		Try: Gould 2, Marais; Carelse, Uys; Nozmis, Meiring; Court; Con: Gould 4

?, Rosario
Referee: Ricardo Colombo (Buenos Aires)

Team details

Rosario: J. Seaton; E. España, J. Benzi, A. Dogliani, J. Galán; J. Caballero, C. Cristi; J. Imhoff, J. Costante, M. Chesta; H. Ferraro, M. Bouza; R. Esmendi, R. Seaton, J. Gómez Kenny.
Gazelles: R. Gould; P. Court, I. Bond, S. Nomis, B. Meiring; P. Visagie, P. Uys; J. Ellis, A. De Waal, J.Marais; E. Claasen, G. Carelse; B. Alberts, B. Harrison, G. Kotze.

31 August 1966

Tucumán	3–80	Gazelles
Pen: Ponce		Try: Ellis 4, Court 4 Gould 3, Carelse 2 Uys 2, Kotze; Swart, Wilkens; De Waal, Bennet. Con: Pretorius 10).

?, San Miguel de Tucumán
Referee: Carlos A. Tozzi (Buenos Aires).

Team details

Tucumán: C. Ponce; N. Antoni, R. Ternavafio, J. Villafañe, G Casanova; E. Burgos, J. Frías Silva; J.C. Ghiringelli, J. Ghiringelli, J. Paz; H. Roldán, J. Lomáscolo; F. Poujada, R. Roldán, N. Du Plessis.
Gazelles: A. Pretorius; P. Court, J. Bennet, S. Nomis, R. Gould; P. Visagie, P. Uys; J. Ellis, A. De Waal, J. Wilkens; G. Carelse, J. Swart; J. Marais, G. Pitzer, G. Kotze.

3 September 1966

Interior	0–28	Gazelles
		Try: Meiring 2, Alberts; Pitzer, De Waal; Uys, Court. Con: Gould 2 Drop: Gould

Estadio GEBA, Buenos Aires
Referee: César De Elizalde (Buenos Aires).

Team details

Seleccionado del Interior: J. Seaton; G. Beverino, E. Quetglas, J. Benzi, L. Rodríguez; J. Caballero, C. Cristi; J. Imhoff, M. Chesta, J. Paz; M. Bouza, E. Cornella; J. Ghiringhelli, R. Seaton, G. Ríbecca.
Gazelles: R. Gould; B. Meiring, J. Bennet, S. Nomis, P. Court; I. Bond, D. De Villiers; C. Du Pisanie, A. De Waal, J. Wilkens; G. Carelse, J. Swart; B. Alberts, G. Pitzer, J. Marais.

7 September 1966

Mar del Plata	3–85	Gazelles
Pen: Marenco		Try: Uys 4, Wilkins 3 Carelse 2, Meiring 2 Gould 2, Kotze; Harrison, Swart; Ellis. Con: Pretorius 14; Pen: Pretorius 2

Parque Camet, Mar del Plata
Referee: Federico Pfister (Buenos Aires).

Team details

Mar del Plata
Gazzelles

Mar del Plata: C. Marenco; A. Verde, A. Omaña, E. Corbacho, G. Beverino; L. Prieto, E. Rodríguez; H. Cabarcos, N. Cerviño, C. Etchegaray; J. Rodríguez Jurado, R. Losada; J. García, R. Mandojana, R. Sepe.
Gazelles: A. Pretorius; R. Gould, J. Bennet, I. Bond, Meiring A.; B. Visagie, D. De Villiers; C. Du Pisanie, J. Wilkens, J. Ellis; G. Carelse, J. Swart; B. Alberts, B. Harrison, G. Kotze.

10 September 1966

Second Division XV	6–60	Gazelles
Pen: Poggi 2		Try: Meiring 4, Ellis 2 De Waal 2, Uys 2 Bond, Pitzer. Con: Pretorius 9. Pen: Pretorius 2

Gimnasia y Esgrima, Buenos Aires
Referee: Ken John (Wales)

Team details

Seleccionado de 2ª División: O. Alonso; J. Fiordalisi, A. Pagano, G. Black, A. Ceccone; E. Poggi, C.Cullen; A. Da Milano, J. Cornejo, J. Marenco; A. Lowenthal, 0. Beltrame, E. Benito, C. Massabón, A. Marenco.
Gazelles: A. Pretorius; P. Court, I. Bond, J. Bennet, B. Meiring; P. Visagie, P. Uys; D. Du Pisanie, A.De Waal, J. Ellis; J. Swart, E. Claasen; J. Marais, G. Pitzer, B. Alberts.

14 September 1966

C.A. San Isidro	0–37	Gazelles
		Try: Ellis 3, Carelse; Claasen, Wilkens; Meiring, Court /Gould; Con: Gould 5

Estadio GEBA, Buenos Aires
Referee: Jorge Comotto (Buenos Aires)

Team details

CA San Isidro
Gazzelles

C. A. San Isidro: J. Lasalle; E. Neri, M. Molina, A. Travaglini, M. Queirolo; M. Beccar Varela, A. Etchegaray; C. Calónico, J. O'Reilly, M. Puigdeval; G. Scallan, A. Pasman; C. Montes de Oca, N.González del Solar, A. Monticelli.
Gazelles: R. Gould; P. Court, S. Nomis, J. Bennet, B. Meiring; I. Bond, P. Uys; J. Ellis, A. De Waal, J. Wilkens; E. Claasen, G. Carelse; J. Marais, B. Harrison, G. Kotze.

17 September 1966

Argentina B	6–29	Gazelles
Try: Cornille; Drop: Poggi		Try: Ellis 2, Carelse; Swart, Du Piesanie; Nomis, Court; Con: Pretorius; Pen: Pretorius, Meiring

Estadio GEBA, Buenos Aires

Team details

Argentina B D. Morgan; C. Cornille, L. Esteras, A. Pagano, A. Quetglas; E. Poggi, A. Etchegaray; G. Plesky, A. Dunn, J. Imhoff; A. Anthony, H. De Martini; W. Aniz, N. González del Solar, J. Ghiringelli.
Gazelles: A. Pretorius; B. Meiring, S. Nomis, J. Bennet, P. Court; J. Barnard, P. Uys; C. Du Piesanie, A. De Waal, J. Ellis; G. Carelse, J. Swart; J. Marais, G. Pitzer, B. Alberts

21 September 1966

Belgrano A.C.	3–19	Gazelles
Try: Cornille		Try: Ellis, Wilkens; Nomis, Meiring; Con: Pretorius 2. Pen: Pretorius

Estadio GEBA, Buenos Aires
Referee: Carlos A. Tozzi (Buenos Aires)

Team details

Belgrano A.C.
Gazzelles

Belgrano A. C..: R. Tanner; C. Cornille, L. Esteras, A. Gómez Aparicio, E. De las Carreras; C. Martínez, L. Gradín; R. Loyola, E. Elowson, H. Valenzuela; M. Cole, C. Iribarren; E. Verardo, F. Gradín, G. Mc Cormick.
Gazelles: A. Pretorius; R. Gould, S. Nomis, I. Bond, B. Meiring; J. Barnard, D. De Villiers; J. Ellis, J. Wilkens, C. Du Piesanie; E. Clasen, G. Carelse; B. Alberts, B. Harrison, G. Kotze.

24 September 1966

Argentina	3–9	Gazelles
Pen: Gradín		Try: Bennet; Pen: Pretorius; Drop: Uys

Estadio GEBA, Buenos Aires
Referee: Ken John (Wales)

Team details

Argentina
Gazzelles

Argentina: M. Dumas; E. Neri, A. Rodríguez Jurado, M. Pascual, H. Goti; R. Cazenave, L. Gradín; M. Chesta, M. Bouza, R. Loyola; B. Otaño, L. García Yañez; G. Mc Cormick, R. Handley, R. Foster.
Gazelles: A. Pretorius; R. Gould, J. Bennet, I. Bond, B. Meiring; J. Barnard, P. Uys; C. Du Piesanie, A. De Waal, J. Ellis; G. Carelse, J. Swart; B. Alberts, G. Pitzer, J. Marais.

28 September 1966

C.U.B.A.	0–29	Gazelles
		Try: De Villiers 2, Carelse; Visagie, Bond; Court; Con: Pretorius 4, Pen: Pretorius

Estadio GEBA, Buenos Aires
Referee: Federico Pfister

Team details

Universitario (BA)
Gazzelles

C.U.B.A.: M. Dumas; H. Goti, A. Álvarez, M. Lawson, J. Freixas; L. Zorraquín, G. Blacksley; C. Fontán, H. Miguens, J. Esteves; F. Álvarez, R. Cazabal; A. Dumas, J. Dumas, E. Gaviña.
Gazelles: A. Pretorius; B. Meiring, J. Bennet, I. Bond, P. Court; P. Visagie, D. De Villiers; C. Du Piesanie, J. Wilkens, J. Marais; G. Carelse, J. Swart; B. Alberts, B. Harrison, G. Kotze.

1 October 1966

Argentina	15–20	Gazelles
Try: Rodríguez Jurado; Pen: Poggi, Gradín; Drop: Poggi 2,		Try: Wilkens, Bond, Meiring; Con: Pretorius; Pen: Pretorius 3

Estadio GEBA, Buenos Aires
Referee: Ken John (Wales)

Team details

Argentina
Gazzelles

Argentina: M. Dumas; E. Neri, A. Rodríguez Jurado, M. Pascual, R. Cazenave; E. Poggi, L. Gradín; R. Loyola, M. Bouza, M. Chesta; B. Otaño, L. García Yañez; G. Me Cormick, R. Handley; R. Foster.
Gazelles: A. Pretorius; P. Court, I. Bond, J. Bennet, B. Meiring; J. Barnard, P. Uys; C. Du Piesanie, J. Wilkens, J. Marais; J. Swart, G. Carelse; G. Kotze, G. Pitzer, B. Alberts.

== Player statistics ==
Name	matches	tries	conv.	pen.	drop	Mark	Point
Meiring, B	11	14		1			45
Alberts, B	10	1					3
Bennet, J.	10	3					9
Carelse, G.	10	8					24
Bond, I	9	3					9
Court, P.	9	10					3
Du Piesanie, C.	9	3					9
Ellis, J	9	17					51
Marais, J.	9	1					3
Pretorius A	9		53	13			145
Swart, J	8	3					9
Kotze, G	8	2					6
Wilkens, J	8	7					21
De Waal, A	7	4					12
Gould, R	7	8	11		1		49
Nomis, S	7	5					15
Pitzer G	7	2					6
Uys P. de	7	10			1		33
Barnard, J..	5						
Claassen, E	5	1					3
De Villiers, D	5	3					9
Coley, M.	4						
Harrison, B.	5	1					3
Visagie, P	5	1					3
		107	64	14	2		497

Note: Totals do not include the match against Chile.
