= Jan Ellis =

South African rugby union player (1942–2013)

- Born: Hendrik Jakobis Ellis; 5 January 1942 Brakpan, South Africa
- Died: 5 February 2013 (aged 71) Pretoria
- Height: 1.89 m (6 ft 2 in)
- Weight: 98 kg (15 st 6 lb)
- Occupation: Business owner

Rugby union career
- Position: Flanker
Provincial / State sides
Years	Team	Apps	(Points)
1964–74	South West Africa	50	(183)
1975–76	Transvaal		
International career
Years	Team	Apps	(Points)
1965–1976	South Africa	38	(21)
National sevens team
Years	Team		Comps
1973	SRU President's VII		1

Jan Hendrik Ellis (5 January 1942 – 8 February 2013) was a South African rugby union player who represented the Springboks in 38 tests, which at his retirement in 1976 was a record. His 7 test tries equalled Ferdie Bergh's record for forwards and were only surpassed in 1997 by Mark Andrews' 12 tries. Playing on the flank, Ellis was instantly recognisable on the field due to his red hair and uncompromising playing style. Among three Springboks invited to participate in the first unofficial rugby sevens world cup in 1973, he was ranked in 2003 as the 12th greatest Springbok of all time.

== Early life ==
Born in South Africa, Ellis' family moved to the then-South African protectorate of South West Africa, where he attended school in Gobabis, a town in a sheep and cattle-farming region. While a pupil at Wennie Du Plessis High School Ellis played in various positions, including fullback. He gained selection to the South West African Schools side, in which he was appointed captain. Ellis would play for his high school in the mornings and turn out for the town's senior team later in the day.

Once he left school Ellis moved to Windhoek to be part of a larger rugby community, playing for the United Rugby Club (1965) and Windhoek Wanderers (1966–) as well as in South Africa for Kempton Park. In 2009 he recalled his period at United as among his most enjoyable playing experiences.

== Career ==
Determined from early on to make a name for himself as a rugby player, Ellis adhered to a punishing fitness regime throughout his career. He was frequently seen around Windhoek running up hills and carrying rocks in his hands to increase his gripping strength. Fellow Springbok Gert Brynard later recalled how during a pre-test fitness session of 14 circuits around two rugby fields Ellis outstripped the rest of the squad. Teammate Jannie Engelbrecht remembered Ellis as always acting as the pace-maker in training runs, and that he would continue on after others would stop.

In 1962 the 20-year-old Ellis was selected at lock for South West Africa's 12 June match at Windhoek's Suidwes Stadion against the British Lions, who were touring South Africa. Although he was selected at lock again for South West's game against Northern Transvaal on 30 June, he was moved to flank for subsequent matches that year against Free State and Western Province.

Encouraged, he moved to Pretoria in 1963 where he joined the Harlequins club with ambitions to play for Northern Transvaal. But when he was not selected, Ellis returned to his brother's farm near Gobabis, determined never to play rugby again. Afrikaans radio commentator Gerhard Viviers recalled that Ellis did not even want to visit Gobabis, but when he was forced to go there to pick up a spare part for his brother's tractor one day, he was convinced to play for the town team that afternoon.

Between 1962 and 1969 Ellis played lock, flank, and number eight for South West Africa. He was chosen to play for various South African development sides, such as the 1966 South African Gazelles tour to Argentina on which he played 9 matches and scored 17 tries, as well as South African Country and South African Barbarian teams.

In 1965 he was invited to the Springbok trials and won a place on the Springbok touring side to Australia and New Zealand in 1965. At the age of 22 Ellis made his test debut against the All Blacks in Wellington on 31 July 1965, replacing Frik du Preez who was moved to lock alongside Tiny Naudé. He became a permanent fixture in this position until his last test against New Zealand on 24 July 1976 in Durban.

Struggling with an injury in 1967, he was at first not selected to attend the Springbok trials prior to the visit by the French national side. When he recovered quicker than expected, the national selectors invited him to play for Durban Collegians in a curtain-raiser to the trials, and he performed well enough to be included in the Springbok squad.

Ellis' talents were best displayed when he was paired with flanker Piet Greyling, a combination initiated during France's 1967 tour to South Africa. Greyling excelled in close-quarter ball-recovery at breakdowns, allowing Ellis to defend wider out and play the attacking role. They played 25 tests together, and Ellis and Greyling's effective disruption of the breakdowns was a major contribution to South Africa's home victory over the touring 1970 All Blacks.

Ellis is remembered for his speed, sidestep, and ability to hand off opponents—talents most famously on display in the two tries he scored at Twickenham against the Barbarian invitational side on 31 January 1970, with the ball "clutched in one big, freckled hand and running with perfect balance". For one try Ellis sprinted 40m, evading four defenders with sidesteps, a change of pace and a feinted pass that wrongfooted Ireland center Mike Gibson. Among his Springbok teammates only wing Syd Nomis could out-sprint Ellis, whose loping long strides made him appear slower than he was. Danie Craven described Ellis as a surprisingly mobile player who could run and sidestep like a back.

As part of the Scottish Rugby Union's centenary celebrations in 1973 Ellis was invited to play in a SRU's presidents XV on 31 March 1973 against Scotland. In April he and Greyling were selected for SRU's President's VIIs side which contested the first unofficial rugby sevens world cup, featuring teams from all eight members of the then-International Rugby Board. Although South Africa was not invited, Springbok fullback Ray Carlson was included alongside Ellis and Greyling.

Ellis played his final match for South West Africa in their 31 August 1974 contest at the Suidwes Stadion against Griqualand West as captain. He scored two tries in their 61–21 defeat of the visitors.

His final match at the age of 34 for the Springboks was the first test against the 1976 All Blacks at Kings Park, Durban, on 24 July 1976. An uncharacteristically lucklustre performance contributed to his omission from the national squad for good.

Ellis captained Transvaal in its outing against the visiting All Blacks on 31 July 1976 at Ellis Park in Johannesburg. Transvaal fielded five players who were injured or ill, including Ellis, who had been bed-ridden with influenza. Nevertheless, his performance was described in the press as better than in the first test. Captions to press photographs of the match referred to his characteristic ball-in-one-hand runs and even an American football-style overhead pass.

In the 50 matches that he played for South West Africa, he scored 32 tries and kicked 33 conversions and 7 penalties. To this tally should be added the 32 tries in 74 appearances that he scored as a Springbok.

== Test history ==
Opposition	Result (RSA 1st)	Position	Tries	Date	Venue
New Zealand	3–6	Flank		31 July 1965	Athletic Park, Wellington
New Zealand	0–13	Flank		21 August 1965	Carisbrook, Dunedin
New Zealand	19–16	Flank		4 September 1965	Lancaster Park, Christchurch
New Zealand	3–20	Flank		18 September 1965	Eden Park, Auckland
France	26–3	Flank	1	15 July 1967	Kings Park, Durban
France	16–3	Flank		22 July 1967	Free State Stadium, Bloemfontein
France	14–19	Flank	1	29 July 1967	Ellis Park, Johannesburg
France	6–6	Flank		12 August 1967	Newlands, Cape Town
Lions	25–20	Flank		8 June 1968	Loftus Versfeld, Pretoria
Lions	6–6	Flank		22 June 1968	EPRFU Stadium, Port Elizabeth
Lions	11–6	Flank		13 July 1968	Newlands, Cape Town
Lions	19–6	Flank	1	27 July 1968	Ellis Park, Johannesburg
France	12–9	Flank		9 November 1968	Stade Chaban-Delmas, Bordeaux
France	16–11	Flank		16 November 1968	Stade Olympique, Colombes
Australia	30–11	Flank	1	2 August 1969	Ellis Park, Johannesburg
Australia	16–9	Flank		6 August 1969	Kings Park, Durban
Australia	11–3	Flank	1	6 September 1969	Newlands, Cape Town
Australia	19–8	Flank		20 September 1969	Free State Stadium, Bloemfontein
Scotland	3–6	Flank		6 December 1969	Murrayfield, Edinburgh
Ireland	8–8	Flank		10 January 1970	Lansdowne Road, Dublin
Wales	6–6	Flank		24 January 1970	National Stadium, Cardiff
New Zealand	17–6	Flank		25 July 1970	Loftus Versfeld, Pretoria
New Zealand	8–9	Flank		8 August 1970	Newlands, Cape Town
New Zealand	14–3	Flank		29 August 1970	EPRFU Stadium, Port Elizabeth
New Zealand	20–17	Flank		12 September 1970	Ellis Park, Johannesburg
France	22–9	Flank		12 June 1971	Free State Stadium, Bloemfontein
France	8–8	Flank		19 June 1971	Kings Park, Durban
Australia	19–11	Flank	1	17 July 1971	Sydney Cricket Ground
Australia	14–6	Flank		31 July 1971	Exhibition Ground, Brisbane
Australia	18–6	Flank	1	17 August 1971	Sydney Cricket Ground
England	9–18	Flank		3 June 1972	Ellis Park, Johannesburg
Lions	3–12	Flank		8 June 1974	Newlands, Cape Town
Lions	9–28	Flank		22 June 1974	Loftus Versfeld, Pretoria
Lions	9–26	Flank		13 July 1974	EPRFU Stadium, Port Elizabeth
Lions	13–13	Flank		27 July 1974	Ellis Park, Johannesburg
France	13–4	Flank		23 November 1974	Le Stade de Toulouse
France	10–8	Flank		30 November 1974	Parc des Princes, Paris
New Zealand	16–7	Flank		24 July 1976	Kings Park, Durban

== Controversies ==
Ellis garnered a reputation as a loner with a fiery temper, earning him the nickname "Die Rooi Duiwel" (The Red Devil). On Springbok tours he chose not to participate in after-match social events, especially because he did not drink alcohol, preferring to read in the team bus. Director Jamie Uys exploited Ellis' temper in his candid camera movie Funny People (1976) by getting him to respond aggressively to an unwitting motorist in a prank involving hidden car horns placed near a stop sign.

Ellis was renowned for his blunt opinions and challenged the South West African rugby establishment so often that he was sometimes omitted in retribution. As a result, he played more matches for South Africa than for his provincial side. Yet he was selected to face touring British Lions sides in 1964, 1968, and 1974 for South West Africa, scoring a try in the latter match.

During the 1969–70 Springbok tour of Britain Ellis disliked the way that coach Avril Malan treated him so much that he packed his bags and had to be persuaded by Frik du Preez and Gerhard Viviers not to board a train to the airport. Malan had omitted Ellis for seven matches following the test on 6 December 1969, which South Africa had lost against Scotland at Murrayfield Stadium, and Ellis had been nursing an injured shoulder. Due mostly to the intervention of Viviers, Malan relented and selected Ellis for the mid-week contest with Midland Counties West on 6 January. Ellis scored a try and produced a performance that secured his place in the test against Ireland.

Over his career Ellis gained a reputation for foul play. Former Springbok captain Wynand Claassen recalled how a cleated Ellis ran across the back of a prone Dirk de Vos in a match between Northern Transvaal and South West Africa. In the first test in Pretoria of the 1968 Lion's tour to South Africa Ellis broke Barry John's collar bone with a high tackle. New Zealand journalist Terry McLean claimed that Ellis had punched All Black captain Andy Leslie in the 31 July 1976 match between Transvaal and the All Blacks hard enough to cause a hairline fracture in his jaw. Ellis vehemently denied hitting Leslie, but McLean suggested that this incident, added to a loss of form, were the reasons Ellis lost his place in the Springbok team. At the after-match event Ellis commented that Leslie had gotten what he deserved.

But Ellis was also on the receiving end of foul play; for example, by All Black Colin Meads in 1970, who in turn found himself the target in a match against Eastern Transvaal in which 12 New Zealand players were injured.

A contrasting side to his personality is demonstrated by Ellis' willingness to visit a hospital and talk to a club player during the 1969-70 Springbok tour of Britain.

Ellis' international career coincided with a period in which South Africa was increasingly isolated through sanctions due to its apartheid policies, and outgoing rugby tours, like the Springboks' 1969–70 visit to the British Isles, were met with sustained demonstrations abroad.

White South African politicians and sports authorities responded with attempts at projecting an image of inclusivity in sports, such as exhibition matches of racially mixed teams against opponents.

Ellis was asked to captain such a mixed South African Invitation XV team for a match on 10 July 1976 at Newlands that included eight future Springboks. While the majority of players represented the whites-only SA Rugby Board, the side included the SA Rugby Football Federation's fullback Ronnie Louw and wing John Noble, while the SA African Rugby Board was represented by prop Broadness Cona and No. 8 Morgan Cushe.

Ellis declined to participate, claiming that he had flu. When pressed, he reportedly said "Multi-racial sport anywhere else in the world is okay. I have played against and socialised with Fijians, Maoris and all other kinds...When in Rome, you do as the Romans tell you. Here in South Africa, the same thing holds, and I am a white South African". When journalists continuously asked Ellis for clarification, he said that talk about his decision was "finish and klaar".

By contrast, Japhet Hellao, former goalkeeper for the then-South West Africa Bantu Football XI, recalled that Ellis "sponsored me with full goalkeeping gear, including a brand new pair of boots while I was a student". Hellao described Ellis as "a kind-hearted human being who never allowed fame to go to his head. He was always humble and a very reserved person". Writing in 2013 Namibian journalist Carlos Kambaekwa said that Ellis was "worshipped by many – including those from across the colour line", and decried the "lukewarm" recognition of Ellis' achievements in post-independence Namibia.

== Later life ==
With start-up funds provided by local business leaders Ellis ran a sports equipment shop in Windhoek until about 1972.

After retiring from rugby Ellis, who had moved to South Africa to play for Transvaal, eventually settled on his Kaalfontein small-holding outside Rayton near Cullinan, where he developed several businesses bearing his name, including an auctioneering firm, a shopping centre, and a filling station. On 22 December 2000 he was shot and seriously wounded in an armed robbery by masked assailants at one of his business premises. One of Ellis' kidneys had to be removed in an emergency operation and he never fully recovered from his wounds. One report claimed that Ellis, despite his serious wounds, held on to one perpetrator and detained him until the police arrived.

== Illness and death ==
Late in life Jan Ellis contracted bone-marrow cancer and suffered for 18 months before dying in a Pretoria hospice on 8 February 2013. Frik du Preez and Piet Greyling were among the surviving teammates who attended his funeral service at the Reformed Church in Cullinan.

In expressing condolences to Ellis' family, Oregan Hoskins, then-president of the South African Rugby Union, remembered Ellis as "one of the greatest Springbok loose forwards of any era...one of those unbelievably tough Springbok forwards for which our country is renowned.

At Ellis' funeral Maryna Viviers told how Jan had visited her husband, Gerhard Viviers (d. 1998), as he lay dying of throat cancer. Worried that Viviers would no longer recognise Ellis, they asked Viviers who his visitor was. With a hoarse voice, Viviers managed to reply, "The greatest flank that South Africa ever produced."

== Honours ==
- Voted Sportsman of the Year by the South West African Sports Writers' Association in 1970.
- Nominated as the South African Rugby Player of the Year in 1971 and 1972.
- Received the Merit Award of the South African Department of Sport and Recreation, 1972.
- A rugby stadium in Gobabis was named after him as were streets in Danville, Pretoria and Centurion, Gauteng.
