= Rodney Gould =

Rodney Gould may refer to:

- Rodney Gould (motorcyclist)
- Rodney Gould (rugby union)
