= Jannie Engelbrecht =

South African rugby union player

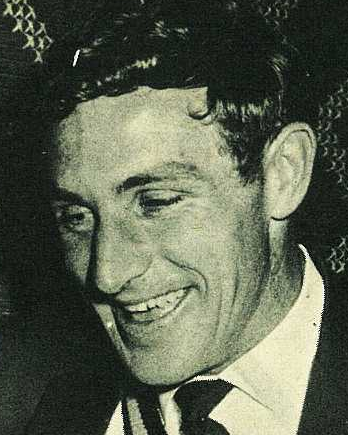
- Jannie Engelbrecht in 1965.
- Born: Jan Pieter Engelbrecht; 10 November 1938 (age 88) Cape Town, South Africa
- Height: 1.85 m (6 ft 1 in)
- Weight: 83.9 kg (185 lb)
- School: Paul Roos Gymnasium
- University: Stellenbosch University
- Occupation: Vintner

Rugby union career
- Position: Wing
Amateur team(s)
Years	Team	Apps	(Points)
- Stellenbosch University
Provincial / State sides
Years	Team	Apps	(Points)
- Western Province
International career
Years	Team	Apps	(Points)
1960-69	South Africa	33	(24)

Jannie Engelbrecht (born 10 November 1938) was a Springbok rugby player who represented his country from 1960 to 1969. He gained a reputation for tenacity as a result of scoring two tries during a vital 1964 provincial match despite having broken his collarbone earlier in the game.

Danie Craven described Engelbrecht as "one of the best wings to ever have played for South Africa", while others described him as fast and elusive "with the excellent change of pace". He held records for most appearances for South Africa as a wing (66) until 2006, and most career test tries scored by a South African (8) which was surpassed by Gerrie Germishuys (12) by 1981.

== Early life ==
Jannie Engelbrecht was born on 10 November 1938 to Attie and Joey Engelbrecht. His siblings included two brothers and three sisters. The elder Engelbrecht was a farmer who owned Kapel, a farm near Klawer in the Western Cape province of South Africa. Attie Engelbrecht contributed to organized agriculture and served on various religious and civil bodies. He died in about 1975, while Joey died in 1992.

Jannie Engelbrecht received his secondary education at Paul Roos Gymnasium in Stellenbosch, where he also played rugby on the wing.

Engelbrecht registered as an agricultural student at Stellenbosch University He lodged at Simonsberg Men's Residence, where he and two other students caused some consternation in 1961 when they "borrowed" two elephants from a visiting circus and brought it to the residence. In 1963 Engelbrecht became primarius of Simonsberg.

== Rugby career ==
=== University career ===
After playing in an intervarsity match for the university's third team alongside Mannetjies Roux, Engelbrecht was promoted to the first team.

Engelbrecht represented a Western Province Universities side in 1963 that won 11–9 against the touring Wallabies in Cape Town. He and Hannes Marais scored a try each in the match.

=== Provincial career ===
Engelbrecht was first selected to play for Western Province in 1960.

In Western Province's 20–11 triumph at Newlands Stadium over the touring French team on 18 July 1964 Engelbrecht added a try to that scored by his teammate Dave Stewart.

Engelbrecht is often remembered for his heroics during the 1 August 1964 Currie Cup clash between Western Province and Blue Bulls in Pretoria. Northern Transvaal were the favorites, having beaten Province 29–5 in their previous encounter that year. Their forwards dominated the first 40 minutes of the game, and the teams restarted with the home side 6–3 ahead.

During the second half Engelbrecht broke his right collarbone after being tackled by Northern's captain, Louis Schmidt. Engelbrecht wanted to leave the field, but his captain, Doug Hopwood, refused. At the time substitutions were not permitted, and Province would have had to continue play with 14 men. Engelbrecht later recalled that the pain was so severe that he wanted to avoid at all costs being tackled again. Spurred by this urgency, he twice ran around the opposition to score, contributing to Province's 16–11 victory and claim to the Currie Cup. Schmidt had to suffer the ignominy of being booed by his home crowd as he left the field. He was dropped after the match and retired at the age of 27.

=== International career ===
Still only 20, Engelbrecht was called up for the 1959 Junior Springbok team that toured Argentina in August and September. The Junior Springboks comprised young players on the verge of making their international debuts. Captained by lock Peter Allen, the team won all 13 of their matches, including two in Buenos Aires against the local national team which featured Stanley and Ricardo Hogg.

Engelbrecht's international career proper started with his selection for the first test against a touring Scottish team on 30 April 1960. He joined 9 other debutants at the EPRU Stadium in Port Elizabeth, including Doug Hopwood and John Gainsford.

The test occurred in the midst of the state of emergency that had been declared on 30 March, following the Sharpeville massacre on 21 March, and which lasted until 31 August. During that period some 20,000 black South Africans would be detained. In the pre-dawn hours before the test government forces arrested 445 people in the townships around Port Elizabeth

The Glasgow Herald noted Craven's prediction of victory for the touring side but nevertheless favoured the untried Springboks. Scottish hopes were pinned on the greater fitness of their team and mobility of their pack. Engelbrecht was viewed as "a danger man with great pace and outside swerve". Danie Craven later recalled that Engelbrecht had injured his shoulder beforehand, and that Craven had to bandage the limb before the wing took to the field. In the event, the experience that 6 of the Springboks had gained on the 1959 Junior Springbok tour to Argentina was reflected in the home side's 18–10 win.

In all Engelbrecht would play 67 times for the Springboks and score 44 tries. In 1965 he scored a hat-trick for the national side against a combined New Zealand regional side at Timaru, and in 1968 he produced 4 tries in a win over a French select team in Toulon.

Engelbrecht celebrated his last appearance in the Springbok jersey on 16 August 1969 with two tries in the 2nd test against Australia at Kings Park in Durban. Strong winds hindered play, and for the first 18 minutes neither side could gain territorial dominance. Then Engelbrecht managed to snag a loose ball and score after Wallaby captain Greg Davis tried to kick from within his 22m area. His second try followed a scrum won by the Springboks near the touch line. Left wing Syd Nomis cut into the backline to create an overlap and Engelbrecht scored after receiving the ball from Mannetjies Roux, who had drawn the last defender. The test gained some notoriety in the Australian press as Craven allegedly said at the after-game reception that playing the Wallabies was like playing schoolboys, to which the Australian team responded by heckling him.

=== Test history ===
Opponents	Results (RSA 1st)	Position	Points	Dates	Venue
Scotland	18-10	Wing		30 Apr 1960	Boet Erasmus Stadium, Port Elizabeth
Wales	3-0	Wing		3 Dec 1960	Cardiff Arms Park, Cardiff
Ireland	8-3	Wing		17 Dec 1960	Lansdowne Road, Dublin
England	5-0	Wing		7 Jan 1961	Twickenham, London
Scotland	12-5	Wing		21 Jan 1961	Murrayfield, Edinburgh
France	0-0	Wing		18 Feb 1961	Stade Olympique, Paris
Australia	28-3	Wing	3 (try)	5 Aug 1961	Ellis Park, Johannesburg
Australia	23-11	Wing		12 Aug 1961	Boet Erasmus, Port Elizabeth
British Lions	3-0	Wing		21 Jul 1962	Kings Park, Durban
British Lions	8-3	Wing		4 Aug 1962	Newlands, Cape Town
British Lions	34-14	Wing		25 Aug 1962	Free State Stadium, Bloemfontein
Australia	5-9	Wing		10 Aug 1963	Newlands, Cape Town
Australia	9-11	Wing		24 Aug 1963	Ellis Park, Johannesburg
Wales	24-3	Wing		23 May 1964	Kings Park, Durban
France	6-8	Wing		25 Jul 1964	PAM Brink Stadium, Springs
Ireland	6-9	Wing		10 Apr 1965	Lansdowne Road, Dublin
Scotland	5-8	Wing	3 (try)	17 Apr 1965	Murrayfield, Edinburgh
Australia	11-18	Wing	6 (2 tries)	19 Jun 1965	Sydney Cricket Ground, Sydney
Australia	8-12	Wing		26 Jun 1965	Lang Park, Brisbane
New Zealand	3-6	Wing		31 Jul 1965	Athletic Park, Wellington
New Zealand	0-13	Wing		21 Aug 1965	Carisbrook, Dunedin
New Zealand	19-16	Wing		4 Sep 1965	Lancaster Park, Christchurch
New Zealand	3-20	Wing		18 Sep 1965	Eden Park, Auckland
France	26-3	Wing		15 Jul 1967	Kings Park, Durban
France	16-3	Wing	3 (try)	22 Jul 1967	Free State Stadium, Bloemfontein
France	14-19	Wing		29 Jul 1967	Ellis Park, Johannesburg
France	6-6	Wing		12 Aug 1967	Newlands, Cape Town
British Lions	25-20	Wing		8 Jun 1968	Loftus Versfeld, Pretoria
British Lions	6-6	Wing		22 Jun 1968	Boet Erasmus, Port Elizabeth
France	12-9	Wing		9 Nov 1968	Stade Municipal, Bordeaux
France	16-11	Wing	3 (try)	16 Nov 1968	Stade Olympique, Paris
Australia	30-11	Wing		2 Aug 1969	Ellis Park, Johannesburg
Australia	16-9	Wing	6 (2 tries)	16 Aug 1969	Kings Park, Durban

=== Rugby administration ===
Engelbrecht served on the executive committee of the Western Province Rugby Union, of which he was elected junior vice-president in 1992. He also sat on the executive for his university's club, the Stellenbosch Rugby Football Club, while Danie Craven was chair. After Craven's death, Engelbrecht assumed leadership of Stellenbosch RFC from 1993 until his resignation in 2004.

In March 1993 he was appointed Springbok manager for the incoming tour by France and the outgoing tour to Australia, alongside new coach Ian McIntosh, and in April 1994 his contract was extended to the end of the 1995 Rugby World Cup. Lauded for the relaxed and open style that he brought to the position, Engelbrecht spoke out several times against dirty play by South African players. Series losses to France (1993), Australia (1993), and New Zealand (1994), led to the firing of the new manager and coach by Louis Luyt, president of the South African Rugby Union. Engelbrecht's disagreements with Luyt about the latter's interventions also played a role in this regard. While McIntosh demurred mildly at his dismissal, Engelbrecht was far more outspoken, blaming Luyt's ego for the fracas and the subsequent results.

== Personal life ==
On 7 December 1963 Engelbrecht married the Namibian Ellen Liebenberg in Windhoek. Earlier that year Ellen had won the Miss South Africa beauty pageant and in July was a semi-finalist at the Miss Universe competition in Miami Beach, Florida. Their children include Angeline (daughter), Jean (son), and Magdeline (daughter). The couple divorced in 2004 after Engelbrecht had had an extra-marital affair.

== See also ==
- List of South Africa national rugby union players – Springbok no. 347
