= Élie Bonal =

France international rugby league footballer

Personal information
- Born: 12 February 1945 (age 81) La Salvetat, Cantal, Auvergne-Rhône-Alpes, France

Playing information

Rugby union
- Position: Wing
Club
Years	Team	Pld	T	G	FG	P
196?–70	Stade Toulousain

Rugby league
- Position: Wing
Club
Years	Team	Pld	T	G	FG	P
1970	AS Carcassonne
Representative
Years	Team	Pld	T	G	FG	P
1970–75	France	9	1	0	0	3
- Relatives: Jean-Marie Bonal (brother); Sébastien Viars (nephew)

Élie Bonal (born on 12 February 1945, in La Salvetat) is a French former rugby union and league footballer who played as wing.

After a rugby union career for Stade Toulousain, he switched to league in 1970, playing for Carcassonne, taking part at the 1970 and 1975 Rugby League World Cups.

== Biography ==
His brothers, Jean-Marie and Patrick, as well his nephew, Sébastien Viars, were also rugby internationals.

== Honours ==
- Team :
  - Winner of the French Championship : 1972 (Carcassonne).
  - Runner-up at the Lord Derby Cup : 1973 (Carcassonne).
