= Paul Durand (rugby union) =

South African rugby union player (1948–1988)

- Full name: Paul Jacobus Durand
- Born: 21 January 1946 Benoni, South Africa
- Died: 1988 (aged 42) Durban, South Africa

Rugby union career
- Position: Fullback
Provincial / State sides
Years	Team	Apps	(Points)
- Western Transvaal
International career
Years	Team	Apps	(Points)
1969	South Africa		

Paul Jacobus Durand (1946 – 1988) was a South African international rugby union player.

== Biography ==
Born in Benoni, Durand went to a school in Stilfontein and afterwards became a sports instructor.

Durand, a fullback, debuted for Western Transvaal in 1965 and was a member of the Springboks squad on their 1969–70 tour of Britain and Ireland, as back up for HO de Villiers. His tour was limited to two minor matches and ended early when he was sent home due to a thigh injury around the time of their second of four international fixtures.

In 1988, Durand was killed in a head-on collision while driving in Durban, aged 42.

Durand's great-nephew Deon Stegmann was capped for the Springboks.

== See also ==
- List of South Africa national rugby union players
