= Rodney Gould (rugby union) =

South African rugby union player

- Full name: Rodney Lloyd Gould
- Born: 10 August 1942 (age 84) King William's Town, South Africa
- Height: 1.85 m (6 ft 1 in)
- Weight: 90 kg (198 lb)

Rugby union career
- Position: Fullback
Provincial / State sides
Years	Team	Apps	(Points)
- Natal
International career
Years	Team	Apps	(Points)
1968	South Africa	4	(3)

Rodney Lloyd Gould (born 10 August 1942) is a South African former international rugby union player.

Gould was born in King William's Town and attended Glenwood High School.

A Natal representative, Gould was preferred over HO de Villiers as Springboks fullback when South Africa hosted the 1968 British Lions, holding his place in the side for all four Test matches. His drop goal in the final Test at Ellis Park helped the Springboks to their third win of the series. He was also a member of their tour of France later that year, during which he was utilised on a wing, but didn't get to feature in any international fixtures.

== See also ==
- List of South Africa national rugby union players
