= Paul Durand =

Paul Durand may refer to:

- Paul Durand (composer), French composer
- Paul Durand (rugby union), South African international rugby union player

== See also ==
- Paul Durand-Ruel, French art dealer
