= Piet Uys (rugby union) =

South African rugby union player

- Full name: Pieter de Waal Uys
- Born: 10 December 1937 Paarl, South Africa
- Died: 12 December 2009 (aged 72) Pretoria, South Africa

Rugby union career
- Position: Scrum-half
International career
| Years | Team | Apps | (Points) |
| 1960–69 | South Africa | 12 | (0) |

Pieter de Waal Uys (10 December 1937 — 12 December 2009) was a South African rugby union international.

Born in Paarl, Uys was a scrum-half, of a bigger size than most who were then playing in that position.

Uys earned 12 Test caps for the Springboks throughout the 1960s. Debuting on the 1960–61 tour of Europe, Uys featured in wins against all the home nations during the trip. He represented the Pretoria Police Rugby Club and turned out in provincial rugby for the Bulls, which he captained in the 1970 Currie Cup final loss to Griqualand West.

== See also ==
- List of South Africa national rugby union players
