= Jean-Marie Bonal =

France international dual-code rugby footballer

Personal information
- Full name: Jean-Marie Bonal
- Born: 31 May 1943 (age 81); Saint-Cirgues-de-Jordanne, Cantal, Auvergne-Rhône-Alpes, France

Playing information

Rugby union
Club
Years	Team	Pld	T	G	FG	P
1964–70	Stade Toulousain
Representative
Years	Team	Pld	T	G	FG	P
1968–70	France	14	5	0	0	15

Rugby league
- Position: Wing
Club
Years	Team	Pld	T	G	FG	P
1971–73	AS Carcassonne
Representative
Years	Team	Pld	T	G	FG	P
1970–75	France	30	1	0	0	3
- Relatives: Élie Bonal (brother); Sébastien Viars (nephew)

Jean-Marie Bonal (born Saint-Cirgues-de-Jordanne, 31 May 1943) is a French former rugby union and rugby league footballer who played in the 1960s and 1970s. He played rugby union as a wing. He is the brother of French rugby league former international Élie Bonal and of former rugby union player Patrick Bonal, as well the uncle of the former rugby union players Sébastien Viars and Jean-François Viars.

He played rugby union for Stade Toulousain.

He had 14 caps for France, from 1968 to 1970, scoring 5 tries, 15 points on aggregate. He played at the Five Nations Championship, in 1968, 1969 and 1970. He had 9 caps, scoring 3 tries, 9 points on aggregate. He won the competition in 1968 with a Grand Slam.

He played rugby league for AS Carcassonne and France.
