= Glenwood High School (Durban) =

Coordinates: 29.86409°S 30.99341°E

Location
- 1 ZK Matthews Road, Glenwood; Durban, KwaZulu-Natal; South Africa

Information
- School type: All-boys public school
- Motto: Nihil Humani Alienum (Nothing that concerns humanity is unimportant to me)
- Religious affiliation: Christianity
- Established: 1 August 1910; 116 years ago
- School district: District 9
- Headmaster: Mr Morne Scott
- Grades: 8–12
- Gender: Male
- Age: 14 to 18
- Enrollment: 1,100 boys
- Language: English
- Schedule: 07:30 - 14:00
- Campus: Urban Campus
- Campus type: Suburban
- Houses: McCabe Early Gibson Blanskby Kennedy
- Colours: Red; Gold; Green; White
- Mascot: Stormin' Norman (Grasshopper)
- Rival: Durban High School Michaelhouse School Maritzburg College
- Newspaper: Sentinel
- School fees: R98,000 (boarding); R76,000 (tuition)
- Website: glenwoodhighschool.co.za

Glenwood High School is a public English medium high school for boys situated in the suburb of Glenwood in Durban in the KwaZulu-Natal province of South Africa. The school was established in 1910, as Durban Technical High School, and split with the Technical High School in 1928 to form Glenwood Boys High School.

== History ==
=== Establishment ===
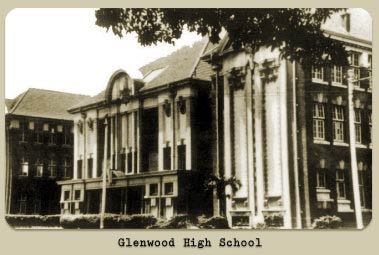
Glenwood High, circa 1914

The school had its origins with the creation of a small institution called the Day Continuation School that was located in a double-story building on Smith St in August 1910 with a student roll of 24 boys. In 1915, due to building size limitations, the Day Continuation School moved to the Technical College building and changed its name to Durban Technical High School which by 1916 had 150 students. Student numbers continued to grow during the First World War and by 1918 there were 267 scholars. In the same year the Natal Provincial Council appointed a commission to investigate the feasibility of expanding the school and the subsequent Coleman-Dukes Report stated that ..a large increase in the numbers [of students] for which it is exceedingly difficult to find accommodation... and recommended the allotment of 10 acres of land on the corner of McDonald (now Alan Paton) and Bulwer Roads in Glenwood. The construction of the school buildings eventually took place and by 1934 the current premises were ready for occupation. At the same time, the school subject matter was changed and all technical subjects were removed from the curriculum (these subjects were allocated to Mansfield Road Intermediate School) (Note: Today known as Steve Biko Campus of the Durban Institute of Technology.) and the name was changed from Durban Technical High School to Glenwood High School, also reflecting the new location.

=== War years ===
==== World War I ====
In 1915 South Africa sent one brigade of Infantry to support the Allied war effort on the Western Front. The 1st South African Infantry Brigade comprised four battalions with the 2nd Battalion being known as the Natal & OFS Battalion, containing many men from Durban and Pietermaritzburg. In 1915, there were only 120 boys at the school, of which (from the Class of 1914 and earlier) twenty five ex-Glenwood pupils lost their lives as part of this Battalion during World War I. Of those killed, four were killed during the Battle of Delville Wood.

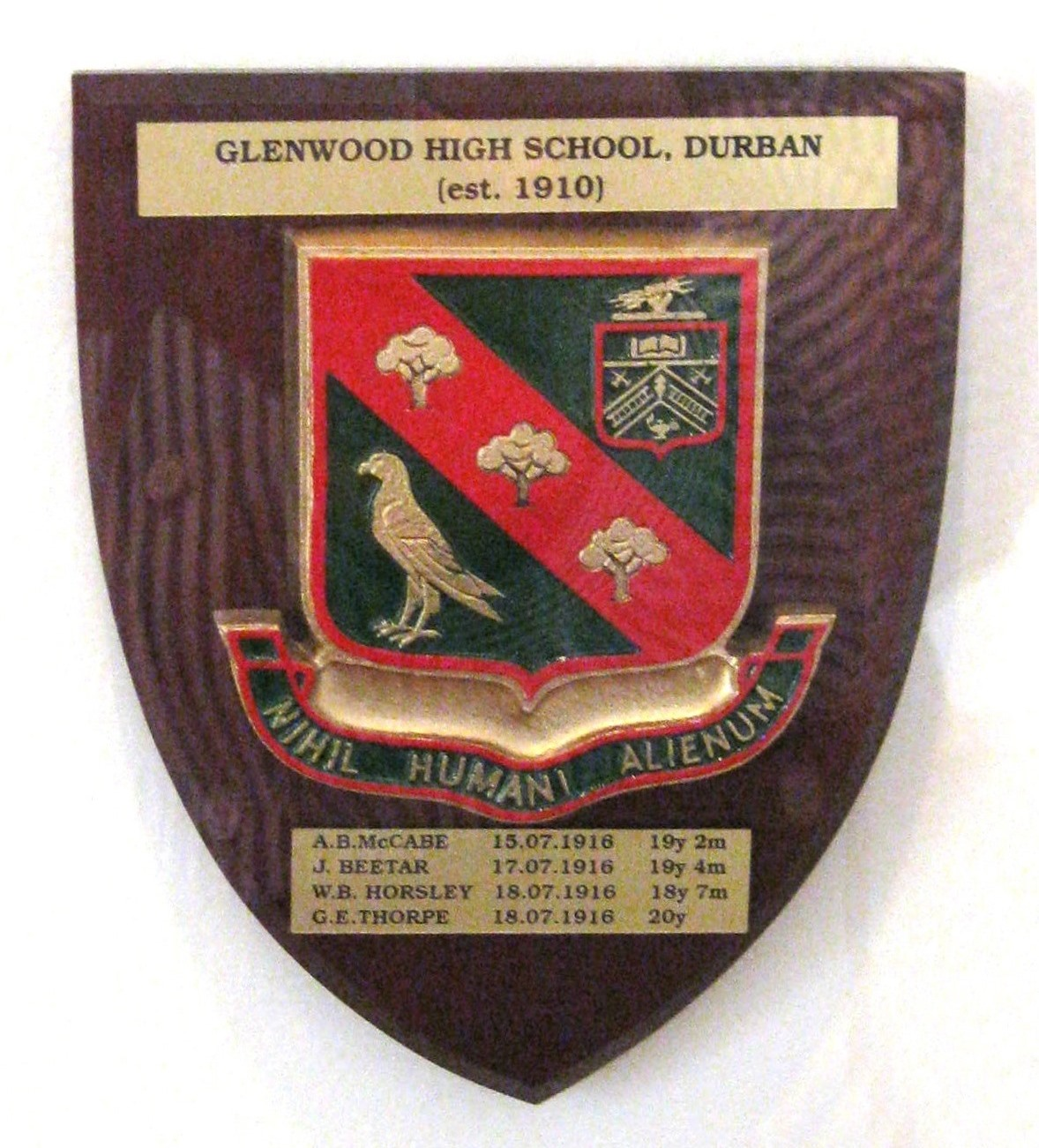
Glenwood High School crest in Delville Wood Memorial commemorating the death of Glenwood old boys in the 1916 Battle of Delville Wood (2009)

==== World War II ====
In 1939, at the start of World War II there were 490 pupils in the school and during the six years of war, 457 Old Boys served in East Africa, the Western Desert and Italy. Of these, 109 were in the South African or Royal Air Force. Out of the 457 who served, 120 old-boys lost their lives during this war. There is a poignant picture of the school's 1st Rugby Team of 1935 where at least 15 of the 18 boys in the photograph volunteered for service in the war and six of those in the photograph were killed. These included Clement (Neville) McGarr, who was one of the prisoners of war to escape from Stalag Luft III as part of the "Great Escape". (Note: 95691 2nd Lieutenant Clement A.N. (known as Neville) McGarr (24 Nov 17 – 24 Mar 44) 2 Sqdn SAAF escaped by tunnel on 24 March 1944. He was caught and executed by the Gestapo.)

=== 1960s and Zoning ===
In the early 1960s the Natal Education Department (NED) made a controversial attempt to enforce school zoning in the core suburbs of Durban. A study conducted by the NED showed that considerable amount of money was being paid to transport students to and from school and that children travelled "further than they should" and introduced a policy that compelled students to attend the closest school to their residence. Glenwood old boys (supported by DHS old boys) defended the schools’ favouring of the children of old boys, reflecting an "English society siege-like mentality" to counter the Afrikaner policies after the National Party's election victory that threatened the perceived English school traditions. Eventually a compromise was reached between the schools and the NED whereby a zoning system was implemented that allocated points based on children's place of residence and on whether they had ties to the school through either their siblings’ or father's schooling. It was labelled as ‘preferential admissions’ or ‘restrictive admissions’ and allowed the Glenwood management the freedom to take out-of-area students when they were not full.

=== Trevor Kershaw fraud scandal ===
In 2019, Trevor Kershaw, who was headmaster between 1999 and 2015, pleaded guilty to charges of defrauding the school of over R5 million. After reaching a plea bargain with the State, he was sentenced to three years of correctional supervision, and a ten-year prison sentence was suspended.

== Facilities ==
Glenwood High is one of the few Durban public schools with a boarding establishment. The boarding establishment was opened in 1935 and is known as Gibson House, named after Roy Gibson, the first pupil to be killed in World War 2. He was the son of "The Lady in White" who saw off soldiers at the docks embarking on ships for tours at the front during the Second World War.

Gibson House is situated on the corner of Alan Paton and Esther Roberts Roads, a short walk from the main school. The original boarding school took only a small number of boys (three dormitories) but has been expanded.

== Notable alumni ==
=== Sport ===
Sport	Name	Year(s)	Achievement(s) / Notes								
Rugby	Wally Clarkson	1921-1924	Springbok rugby international (Centre).								
Rugby	Mauritz van den Berg	1937	Springbok rugby international (Lock).								
Rugby	Roger Sherriff	1938	Springbok rugby international (Lock).								
Rugby	Don Walton	1964	Springbok rugby international (Hooker).								
Rugby	Rodney Gould	1968	Springbok rugby international (Fullback)								
Rugby	John Allan	1990-1996	Springbok and Scotland rugby international (Hooker).								
Tennis	Kevin Curren	1979-1982	International tennis player								
Rugby	Nanyak Dala	2007	Former international Canadian World Cup rugby player								
Cricket	Steven Jack		International cricketer								
Motorsport	Gordon Murray	1987-2004	McLaren F1 car designer.								
Cricket	Colin Munro	2012-2020	New Zealand International Cricketer								
Rugby	[[Jaden Hendrikse]]	2019-Current		South African International Rugby Player,Plays for Sharks Rugby	Rugby	[[Jordan Hendrikse]]	2022-Current	South African International Rugby Player, 3 Caps, Plays for Sharks Rugby	Rugby	Nico Steyn	2018-Current
Surfing	Jordan Michael "Jordy" Smith	2010-2018	Professional surfer Qualified to represent South Africa at the 2020 Summer Olympics.								
Rugby	Warren Whiteley	2014	Springbok Rugby player (No. 8) and Lions rugby team Captain								

=== Politics, law and government ===
Field	Name	Year(s)	Achievement(s) / Notes
Politician	Ivan Toms		Late physician and political activist, recipient of the National Order of Boabab

== Sports ==
The sports that are offered in the school are:

- Athletics
- Basketball
- Chess
- Cricket
- Cross country
- eSports
- Golf
- Hockey
- Rugby
- Sailing
- Soccer
- Softball
- Squash
- Surfing
- Swimming
- Target shooting
- Water polo
