= Dave Stewart (rugby union) =

South African rugby union player

- Full name: David Alfred Stewart
- Born: 14 July 1935 Cape Town, South Africa
- Died: 22 November 2022 (aged 87)

Rugby union career
- Position: Centre / Fly-half
International career
Years	Team	Apps	(Points)
1960–65	South Africa	11	(9)

David Alfred Stewart (14 July 1935 – 22 November 2022) was a South African rugby union international.

Stewart was born in Cape Town and attended Wynberg High School. He played 11 test matches for the Springboks in the early 1960s, mostly as either a centre or fly-half. On the 1960–61 tour of Europe, Stewart appeared in three of the five tests, as the Springboks achieved wins over all the home nations. He later served as a national selector.

== See also ==
- List of South Africa national rugby union players
