= Mof Myburgh =

South African rugby union player

- Full name: Johannes Lodewikus Myburgh
- Born: 24 August 1936 Senekal, South Africa
- Died: 15 June 2012 (aged 75) Pretoria, South Africa

Rugby union career
- Position: Prop
International career
Years	Team	Apps	(Points)
1962–70	South Africa	18	(0)

Johannes Lodewikus Myburgh (24 August 1936 — 15 June 2012) was a South African rugby union international.

Myburgh, who was a police detective by profession, was born in the town of Senekal in Orange Free State.

A strongly built prop, Myburgh played 20 matches for the Springboks on the 1960–61 European tour, but had to wait until 1962 for his first Test cap, against the British Lions at Ellis Park. He appeared in 18 Test matches during his career, which he finished with a home series win over the All Blacks in 1970. His provincial rugby was played with Northern Transvaal.

== See also ==
- List of South Africa national rugby union players
