= Gawie Carelse =

South African rugby union player

- Full name: Gabriel Carelse
- Born: 21 July 1941 Port Elizabeth, South Africa
- Died: 3 August 2002 (aged 61) Port Elizabeth, South Africa

Rugby union career
- Position: Lock
International career
Years	Team	Apps	(Points)
1964–69	South Africa	14	(0)

Gabriel Carelse (21 July 1941 – 3 August 2002) was a South African rugby union international.

Born in Port Elizabeth, Carelse was capped in 14 Test matches for the Springboks from 1964 to 1969. He played as a lock and was often partnered with Frik du Preez while in South African colours. His Springboks career included three overseas tours. He also represented Eastern Province in 102 matches, captaining the side in the late 1960s.

Carelse suffered from poor health in his later years. He was a diabetic and had his left leg amputated in 1991, before dying of kidney failure at a Port Elizabeth hospital in 2002, at the age of 61.

== See also ==
- List of South Africa national rugby union players
