= Don Walton =

South African rugby union player

- Full name: Donald Cameron Walton
- Born: 5 April 1939 Durban, South Africa
- Died: 29 June 2023 (aged 84)
- Height: 1.83 m (6 ft 0 in)
- Weight: 88.5 kg (195 lb)

Rugby union career
- Position: Hooker
Provincial / State sides
Years	Team	Apps	(Points)
1961–69	Natal	73	
International career
Years	Team	Apps	(Points)
1964–69	South Africa	8	

Donald Cameron Walton (5 April 1939 – 29 June 2023) was a South African international rugby union player.

Walton grew up in Durban and learned his rugby as a pupil at Northlands Primary School. He attended Glenwood High School and had a long association with rugby club Glenwood Old Boys.

A lively hooker, Walton was a regular for Natal through the 1960s and gained eight Springboks caps. He debuted in a home Test match against France in 1964 and was able to displace former captain Abie Malan as Springboks hooker during the New Zealand leg of their 1965 tour. Two weeks after appearing against England at Twickenham on their 1969–70 tour, Walton suffered a skull fracture in a minor tour match in Coventry, which proved to be career ending.

Walton served as a Natal selector between 1978 and 1981.

== See also ==
- List of South Africa national rugby union players
