= 1967 France rugby union tour of South Africa =

Summary
P	W	D	L
Total
13	8	1	4
Test match
4	1	1	2
Opponent
P	W	D	L
South Africa
4	1	1	2

The 1967 France rugby union tour of South Africa was a series of matches played during July and August 1967 by France national rugby union team in South Africa and Rhodesia.

== Squad ==
=== Full-backs ===
- Claude Lacaze
- Pierre Villepreux
- Jacques Crampagne

=== Wings ===
- Christian Darrouy (captain)
- Jacques Londios
- Bernard Duprat

=== Centres ===
- Jean-Pierre Lux
- Claude Dourthe
- Jean Trillo
- Jean Saby

=== Fly-halves ===
- Guy Camberabero
- Jean-Louis Dehez
- Jean-Claude Roques

=== Scrum-halves ===
- Marcel Puget
- Gérard Sutra

=== Props ===
- Andre Abadie
- Jean Esponda
- Michel Lasserre
- Bernard Cardebad

=== Hookers ===
- Jean-Michel Cabanier
- Jean-Claude Malbet

=== Locks ===
- Benoit Dauga
- Walter Spanghero
- Jacques Fort (vice-captain)
- Alain Plantefol

=== Loose forwards ===
- Christian Carrere
- Michel Sitjar
- Andre Quilis
- Gerard Viard

== Management ==
- Manager : Marcel Batigne
- Assistant Manager : Marcel Laurent
- Coach : Andre Garrigue
- Interpreter : Jacques Rosselli

== Results ==
Scores and results list France's points tally first.

Opposing Team	For	Against	Date	Venue	Status
Rhodesia	36	13	5 July 1967	Police Ground, Salisbury	Tour Match
South Western Districts	25	6	7 July 1967	Outeniqua Park, George	Tour Match
Eastern Province	16	8	8 July 1967	Boet Erasmus Stadium, Port Elizabeth	Tour Match
Boland	18	11	10 July 1967	Boland Park, Wellington	Tour Match
South Africa	3	26	15 July 1967	Kings Park Stadium, Durban	Test Match
Western Transvaal	38	11	19 July 1967	Olen Park, Potchefstroom	Tour Match
South Africa	3	16	22 July 1967	Free State Stadium, Bloemfontein	Test Match
Eastern Transvaal	18	5	25 July 1967	PAM Brink Stadium, Springs	Tour Match
South Africa	19	14	29 July 1967	Ellis Park, Johannesburg	Test Match
Griqualand West	14	20	2 August 1967	De Beers Stadium, Kimberley, South Africa	Tour Match
Northern Transvaal	5	19	5 August 1967	Loftus Versfeld Stadium, Pretoria	Tour match
Border	8	6	8 August 1967	Buffalo City Stadium, East London	Tour Match
South Africa	6	6	12 August 1967	Newlands, Cape Town	Test Match
