= Jean Iraçabal =

France international rugby union player

- Born: 6 July 1941 (age 85) Larressore, France
- Height: 5 ft 10 in (178 cm)
- Weight: 216 lb (98 kg)

Rugby union career
- Position: Prop
International career
Years	Team	Apps	(Points)
1968–1974	France	34	(0)

Jean Iraçabal (born 6 July 1941) is a French former international rugby union player.

Born in Larressore, Iraçabal played for Aviron Bayonnais and was capped 34 times as a prop for France from 1968 to 1974, often partnering with fellow Basque prop Jean-Louis Azarete in the front row. He debuted during their 1968 tour of New Zealand. The All Blacks nicknamed him the "Indomitable", as he would never back down, and he had success against them in 1973 as a member of the only Five Nations side to defeat the touring All Blacks.

== See also ==
- List of France national rugby union players
