= Piet Visagie =

South African rugby union player

- Full name: Petrus Jacobus Visagie
- Born: 16 April 1943 Kimberley, South Africa
- Died: 22 December 2022 (aged 79) Potchefstroom, South Africa
- Height: 5 ft 8 in (173 cm)
- Weight: 161 lb (73 kg)

Rugby union career
- Position: Fly-half
International career
Years	Team	Apps	(Points)
1967–71	South Africa	25	(130)

Petrus Jacobus Visagie (16 April 1943 – 22 December 2022) was a South African rugby union international.

Visagie, raised in the town of Reivilo, was a mine worker at Beeshoek and played for the local Ammosal rugby club. He went on to represent Griquas in provincial rugby and was a key member of the 1970 Currie Cup winning side.

A fly-half, Visagie was capped in 25 Test matches for the Springboks. He featured in series wins over Australia, the British & Irish Lions, France and New Zealand. The 43 points he amassed on Australia's four-Test 1969 tour of South Africa set a world record for a series. His career ended prematurely at the age of 28 due to a broken leg.

Visagie's younger brother Gawie was also a Springboks representative.

== See also ==
- List of South Africa national rugby union players
