= Hannes Marais =

South African rugby union footballer

- Born: Johannes Frederick Klopper Marais; 21 September 1941 (age 85) Somerset East, South Africa
- Height: 1.82 m (6 ft 0 in)
- Weight: 100 kg (220 lb)
- School: Gill College, Somerset East
- University: Stellenbosch University; University of Port Elizabeth

Rugby union career
- Position: Prop
Amateur team(s)
Years	Team	Apps	(Points)
1960	Maties		
Provincial / State sides
Years	Team	Apps	(Points)
1962–1963	Western Province		
1964–1967 1970–1974	Eastern Province		
1968–1969	North Eastern Cape		
International career
Years	Team	Apps	(Points)
1963–1974	South Africa	35	(3)

Johannes Frederick Klopper "Hannes" Marais (born 21 September 1941) is a former South African rugby captain. He was capped 35 times, scoring one try.

== Personal history ==
Marais was born in the town of Somerset East and grew up on a farm near Cookhouse. He attended Gill College in Somerset East, a school that also produced the Springbok brothers Willie and Michael du Plessis. After school he went to study agriculture at the Stellenbosch University, with the intention of becoming a veterinarian. Later on he did his doctorate at the University of Port Elizabeth, the forerunner of the Nelson Mandela Metropolitan University.

== Rugby career ==
In his schooldays he was a loose forward, but was converted into a prop by Danie Craven when he went to Stellenbosch.

At provincial level, he represented Western Province as well as now-defunct North Eastern Cape and Eastern Province.

He won his first cap against Australia in 1963 and his last against France in 1974. He became captain in 1971 after having served as vice-captain in 1970.

After retiring from first-class rugby, he continued to play for his hostel team at university for five seasons and stopped playing altogether just shy of his 40th birthday.

== Life after rugby ==
After his retirement from playing, he coached the University of Port Elizabeth's as well as the Eastern Province under-20 sides and was also the assistant coach to the Eastern Province senior team for a while. He served as a Springbok selector from 1982 through 1986, and then again from 1993 up to the 1995 Rugby World Cup.

== See also ==
- President's Overseas XV
- 1969–70 South Africa rugby union tour
- List of South Africa national rugby union players – Springbok no. 390

== Bibliography ==
- Griffiths, Edward (2001). Die Kapteins (The Captains). Jonathan Ball. ISBN 1-86842-116-3.

Sporting positions
Preceded by Tommy Bedford	Springbok Captain; 1971–1974	Succeeded by Piet Greyling
