= Police Ground =

Sports venue in Antigua and Barbuda

Coordinates: 17°07′04″N 61°48′55″W

The Police Ground is a multi-use stadium located in St. George Parish on Antigua Island, in Antigua and Barbuda.

It is currently used mostly for football (soccer) and Cricket matches.

The stadium holds 2,000 people.

== See also ==
- Category:Saint George, Antigua and Barbuda
