= Michel Greffe =

French rugby union player (born 1940)

- Born: 27 October 1940 (age 86) Lyon Metropolis, France
- Height: 5 ft 10 in (178 cm)
- Weight: 200 lb (91 kg)

Rugby union career
- Position: Back-row
International career
| Years | Team | Apps | (Points) |
| 1968 | France | 5 | (0) |

Michel Greffe (born 27 October 1940) is a French former international rugby union player.

Greffe hails from Villeurbanne, a commune outside Lyon, and was a rugby league footballer during his youth, earning two caps for the junior national team. He switched to rugby union in 1958 to play for FC Grenoble.

A back-rower, utilised mostly as a number eight, Greffe was still with FC Grenoble when he gained an international call up in 1968, having impressed with a South-East combined team that upset France in an exhibition match. He debuted in France's final 1968 Five Nations fixture against Wales at Cardiff, which they won to secure the country's maiden grand slam. After gaining a second cap against Czechoslovakia, Greffe won a place on the 1968 tour to New Zealand and Australia, where he was capped twice. His tour ended early when he suffered two broken ribs in the second Test match against the All Blacks. Later in 1968, Greffe gained a fifth and final cap in a home Test match against the Springboks.

Greffe was a flag carrier at the 1968 Winter Olympics opening ceremony, as a representative of host city Grenoble.

During the 1970s, Greffe served as captain and coach of US Bressane.

== See also ==
- List of France national rugby union players
