= Henri Magois =

French rugby union player (born 1947)

- Born: 1 January 1947 (age 79) La Rochelle, France
- Height: 5 ft 8 in (173 cm)
- Weight: 154 lb (70 kg)

Rugby union career
- Position: Fullback
Senior career
Years	Team	Apps	(Points)
1964-1981	Stade Rochelais	409	(1057)
International career
Years	Team	Apps	(Points)
1968	France	3	(0)

Henri Magois (born 1 January 1947) is a French former international rugby union player.

Magois grew up in La Rochelle as a next door neighbour of Arnaud Élissalde, the coach of Stade Rochelais, and was a product of the same club's youth academy, which he joined at the age of eight.

A fullback, used at times as an outside centre or fly-half, Magois spent his entire career with Stade Rochelais and is credited with 409 appearances from 1964 to 1981.

Magois was capped three times for France in 1968, having impressed for a South East combined XV in torrential rain against the touring Springboks. With Pierre Villepreux unavailable, Magois was selected as France's fullback for the two Test matches against the South Africans. He held his spot for a match against Romania in Bucharest.

In 1980, Magois participated in the first ever official match played by the French Barbarians.

== See also ==
- List of France national rugby union players
