= 1964 France rugby union tour of South Africa =

Summary
P	W	D	L
Total
6	5	0	1
Test match
2	2	0	0
Opponent
P	W	D	L
South Africa
1	1	0	0
Rhodesia
1	1	0	0

== Results ==
Scores and results list France's points tally first.

Opposing Team	For	Against	Date	Venue	Status
Rhodesia	34	11	11 July 1964	Police Ground, Salisbury	Tour match
Giqualand West	29	3	15 July 1964	De Beers Diamond Oval, Kimberley	Tour match
Western Province	11	20	18 July 1964	Newlands, Cape Town	Tour match
Border	14	6	21 July 1964	Buffalo City St., East London	Tour match
South Africa	8	6	25 July 1964	PAM Brink, Springs	Test Match
Transvaal	21	9	29 July 1964	Ellis Park, Johannesburg	Tour match
