= Jean Trillo =

French rugby union player (born 1944)

- Born: 27 October 1944 (age 82) Condom, Gers, France
- Height: 5 ft 10 in (178 cm)
- Weight: 167 lb (76 kg)

Rugby union career
- Position: Centre
International career
Years	Team	Apps	(Points)
1967–73	France	28	(19)

Jean Trillo (born 27 October 1944) is a French former rugby union international.

Born in Condom, Trillo was a centre who was regarded as a tough defender and spent his career with CA Bègles, which he joined from hometown club SA Condom in 1964. He was on the CA Bègles team which won the 1968–69 Brennus Shield, scoring their only try in the 11–9 final win over Toulouse, after intercepting a pass meant for Jean-Louis Bérot.

Trillo, capped 28 times by France, made his debut on the 1967 tour of South Africa. He played twice in France's grand slam-winning 1968 Five Nations campaign. His career included tours of Australia and New Zealand.

In 1991, Trillo was on the French coaching team for the Rugby World Cup.

Trillo's sons François and Philippe also competed in French rugby, the former becoming a noted sports journalist.

In 2013, Trillo received the Legion of Honour award.

== See also ==
- List of France national rugby union players
