= Saint-Cirgues-de-Jordanne =

Commune in Auvergne-Rhône-Alpes, France

- Commune
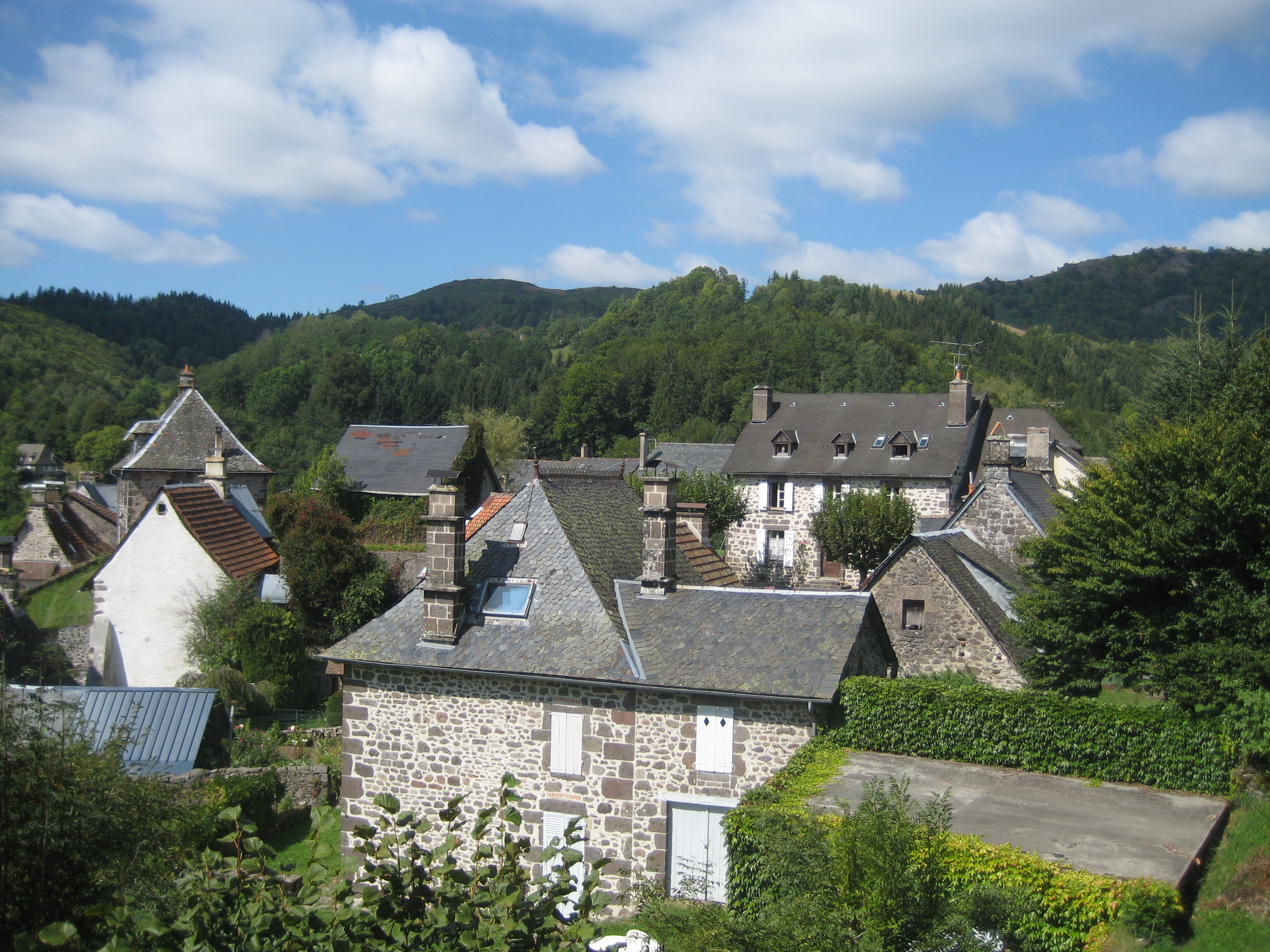
- A general view of Saint-Cirgues-de-Jordanne
- Location of Saint-Cirgues-de-Jordanne
- Location within France Location within Auvergne-Rhône-Alpes
- Coordinates: 45°01′45″N 2°34′59″E
- Country: France
- Region: Auvergne-Rhône-Alpes
- Department: Cantal
- Arrondissement: Aurillac
- Canton: Vic-sur-Cère
- Intercommunality: CA Aurillac Agglomération

Government
  - Mayor (2020–2026): Philippe Maurs
- Area^{1}: 16.24 km^{2} (6.27 sq mi)
- Elevation: 800 m (2,600 ft)
- Highest elevation: 1,520 m (4,990 ft)
- Lowest elevation: 733 m (2,405 ft)
- Population (2023): 133
  - Density: 8.19/km^{2} (21.2/sq mi)
- Time zone: UTC+01:00 (CET)
  - Summer (DST): UTC+02:00 (CEST)
- INSEE/Postal code: 15178 /15590
- ^{1} French Land Register data, which excludes lakes, ponds, glaciers > 1 km^{2} (0.386 sq mi or 247 acres) and river estuaries.

Saint-Cirgues-de-Jordanne (French pronunciation: [sɛ̃ siʁɡ də ʒɔʁdan]; Occitan: Sant Cirgue de Jordana) is a commune in the Cantal department in south-central France.

== Population ==
Historical population
Year	Pop.	±% p.a.
1968	293	—
1975	249	−2.30%
1982	223	−1.56%
1990	199	−1.41%
1999	176	−1.36%
2007	148	−2.14%
2012	135	−1.82%
2017	137	+0.29%
2023	133	−0.49%
Source: INSEE

== See also ==
- Communes of the Cantal department
