= Eben Olivier =

South African rugby union player

- Full name: Ebenhaezer Olivier
- Born: 10 April 1944 (age 82) Kirkwood, South Africa
- Height: 5 ft 11 in (180 cm)
- Weight: 178 lb (81 kg)

Rugby union career
- Position: Centre
International career
Years	Team	Apps	(Points)
1967–69	South Africa	16	(15)

Ebenhaezer Olivier (born 10 April 1944) is a South African former rugby union international.

Olivier was born and raised in Kirkwood, a town near Port Elizabeth.

A provincial player for Western Province, Olivier was capped in 16 Test matches as a centre for the Springboks from 1967 to 1969. He had a distinctive body swerve when he ran which proved deceptive to defences. His five Test tries included a double against Australia at Bloemfontein in 1969. During this period, Olivier was a teacher at Paul Roos Gymnasium.

== See also ==
- List of South Africa national rugby union players
