= Gys Pitzer =

South African rugby union player (1939–2025)

- Full name: Gysbertus Pitzer
- Born: 8 July 1939 Louis Trichardt, Transvaal, South Africa
- Died: April 2025 (aged 85) South Africa
- School: Hoërskool Frikkie Meyer

Rugby union career
- Position: Hooker
International career
| Years | Team | Apps | (Points) |
| 1967–69 | South Africa | 12 | (0) |

Gysbertus Pitzer (8 July 1939 – April 2025) was a South African rugby union international.

Pitzer was born in the town of Louis Trichardt and played provincial rugby for Northern Transvaal.

A hooker, Pitzer earned 12 Test caps for the Springboks from 1967 to 1969. He played all four Tests in the 1968 British Lions tour and during one of the matches famously felled opposite hooker John Pullin with a punch. The Englishman would later bring up Pitzer's name as the best hooker he had played against. On the 1969–70 tour of Britain and Ireland, Pitzer hurt his back and had to spend three weeks in a Swansea hospital, which ruled him out of the Tests.

Pitzer died in South Africa in April 2025, at the age of 85.

== See also ==
- List of South Africa national rugby union players
