= Élie Cester =

France international rugby union player

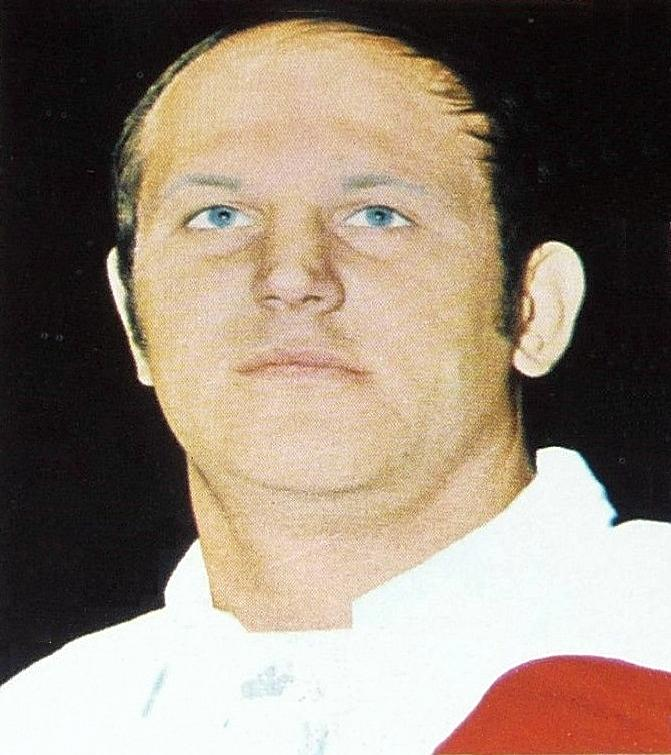
- Born: 27 July 1942 L'Isle-Jourdain, France
- Died: 3 January 2017 (aged 74) Bourg-les-Valence, France
- Height: 1.91 m (6 ft 3 in)
- Weight: 108 kg (238 lb)

Rugby union career
- Position: Lock
International career
Years	Team	Apps	(Points)
1966–1974	France	35	(3)

Élie Cester (27 July 1942 – 3 January 2017) was a French rugby union player who played at lock for the France national rugby union team.

== Early life and career ==
Élie Cester was born on 27 July 1942 in L'Isle-Jourdain, France.

Cester earned his first cap for the France national rugby union team on 15 January 1966.

He made a total of 35 official appearances for the French national team between 1966 and 1974. He captained the team on three occasions.

Roques was part of the French national team that won the Five Nations Championship in 1967, 1968, 1970 (tied with Wales) and 1973.

== Death ==
Cester died at the age of 74 in Bourg-les-Valence, France, on 3 January 2017.

== See also ==
- France national rugby union team
