= Sébastien Viars =

France international rugby union player

Sébastien Viars (born 24 June 1971) is a former French rugby union footballer. He was nicknamed "The Compass". He played as a centre and as a wing.

== Club career ==
Viars was born at Aurillac. He played at Stade Aurillacois (1989/90-1991/92), CA Brive (1992/93-1997/98), where he won the Cup of France, in 1995/96, Stade Français Paris (1998/99), winning once more the Cup of France, and ASM Clermont (1999/2000-2005/06), where he would finish his career. He won the Heineken Cup, in 1997, with CA Brive, scoring an anthological try in the 28–9 win over Leicester Tigers, from England.

== International career ==
Even in a short international career, he's usually considered one of the best French players of his generation. Viars held 17 caps for France, from 1992 to 1997, scoring 9 tries, 17 penalties and 17 conversions, 127 points in aggregate. He played two times at the Five Nations, in 1992 and 1995, scoring 4 tries, 6 conversions and 4 penalties, 41 points in aggregate. He scored a record of 26 points, 2 tries, 5 conversions and 2 penalties, in the 44–12 win over Ireland, at 21 March 1992. He was also one of the top try scorers of the competition with 3 tries. He was mentioned in the Guinness Book of Records for 1992, for his points record in a single game.

Viars was selected for the 1995 Rugby World Cup finals, playing a single game, in the 54–18 win over Côte d'Ivoire and scoring a try.

Viars wasn't called again for the National Team since 1997, when he was only 26 years old.
