= Johan Claassen =

South African rugby union player (1929–2019)

Johannes Theodorus Claassen
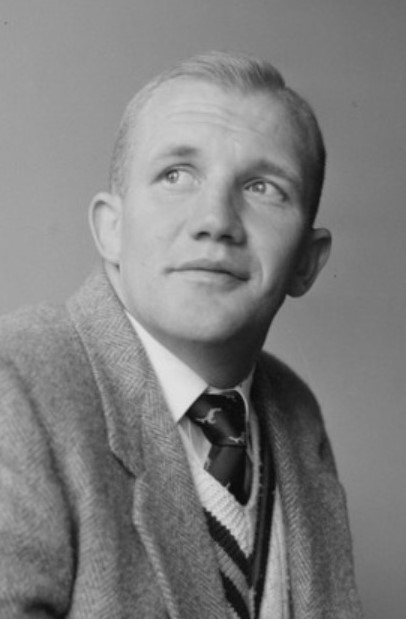
- Claassen in New Zealand in 1956
- Born: 23 September 1929 Prince Albert, Cape Province, Union of South Africa
- Died: 6 January 2019 (aged 89) Pretoria, Gauteng, South Africa

Rugby union career
- Position: Second-row forward
Senior career
Years	Team	Apps	(Points)
1949–1962	Western Transvaal	105	
International career
Years	Team	Apps	(Points)
1955–1962	South Africa	28	(10)

Professor Johannes Theodorus Claassen (23 September 1929 – 6 January 2019) was a South African rugby player, playing at the second-row forward position.

== Biography ==
He attended school in Christiana and later attended university in Potchefstroom. He made his first appearance for Western Transvaal when he was 19 years old and went on to play a total of 105 matches for Western Transvaal. He made his Test debut six years later against the Lions at Ellis Park.

In 1958, Claassen became captain of the South African National Team before a match against the French. In 1962, he led the South African team to a winning streak, including a major victory over the British and Irish Lions. From 1968 to 1971 he was head coach of the South African team, known as the Springboks, winning 17 out of 26 test matches.

In club rugby, Claassen was most notably a star for Western Transvaal.

After retiring from rugby he went on to become a teacher, before becoming a lecturer at Potchefstroom University and later a Professor of Bible Studies.

Rugby Union Captain
Preceded by Salty du Rand	Springbok Captain; 1955-1958	Next: Des van Jaarsveldt
