= Piet Greyling =

South African rugby union player

- Born: Pieter Johannes Frederik 'Piet' Greyling; 16 May 1942 (age 84) Zastron, South Africa
- Height: 1.83 m (6 ft 0 in)
- Weight: 85 kg (13 st 5 lb)
- School: Hoërskool Sentraal, Bloemfontein
- University: Potchefstroom Agriculture College

Rugby union career
- Position: Flanker
Amateur team(s)
Years	Team	Apps	(Points)
1967	Collegians (Bloemfontein)		
Provincial / State sides
Years	Team	Apps	(Points)
1967	Orange Free State		
1969–72	Transvaal		
International career
Years	Team	Apps	(Points)
1967–72	ZAF	25	(5 tries)

Pieter Johannes Frederik 'Piet' Greyling, born 16 May 1942 in Zastron, South Africa, is a South African rugby union player who has represented the national team, the Springboks, 43 times, captaining them once, and scoring 5 tries in total. Greyling has been described as one of the best and toughest flanks, and is best known for his pairing with Jan Ellis in 24 tests.

== Early life ==
Piet Greyling was brought up on a tobacco farm in Mashonaland in then-Rhodesia. At the age of 14 he was sent to Sentraal High School in Bloemfontein, and eventually played for Free State Schools. After briefly attending Potchefstroom Agricultural College, Greyling returned to Rhodesia.

== Career ==
Greyling played club rugby for Hartley and represented Rhodesia, which in those years participated in South Africa's top-level domestic provincial league, the Currie Cup. He featured well in Rhodesia's match against Michel Crauste's 1964 touring French side, which the home team lost 11–34.

In 1965 Greyling moved to South Africa. Stints for the Free State (1967) and Northern Transvaal teams followed, before he settled for Transvaal, where he played for Diggers Rugby Club. Under his captaincy Transvaal shared the Currie Cup with Northern Transvaal in 1971, ending a 19-year drought, and won it outright in 1972 with a 25–19 win against Eastern Transvaal.

Greyling made his Springbok debut at flank in the first test against France at Kings Park, Durban, on 15 July 1967, which South Africa won 26–3. South African rugby administrator Danie Craven described the test as a vital one, as South Africa had lost 8 of its previous 9 test matches.

When Greyling and Jan Ellis played for the same team, they formed a formidable pair in which Greyling performed a destructive role on which Ellis could capitalise, as Barry John recalled in his 1974 autobiography.

Greyling's work ethic on the field was such that doc Craven said that for 80 minutes he drove himself like a slave.

Sporting positions
Preceded by Hannes Marais	Springbok Captain; 1972	Succeeded by Morne du Plessis
