= HO de Villiers =

South African rugby union player (1945–2022)

- Born: Henry Oswald de Villiers; 10 March 1945 Johannesburg, South Africa
- Died: 20 February 2022 (aged 76)
- Height: 1.83 m (6 ft 0 in)
- Weight: 84 kg (185 lb)
- School: Dale College
- University: University of Cape Town

Rugby union career
- Position(s): Fullback, Wing
Amateur team(s)
Years	Team	Apps	(Points)
1965–1967	Ikeys RFC		
1968–1979	Villagers FC		
Provincial / State sides
Years	Team	Apps	(Points)
1965–1975	Western Province	38	
International career
Years	Team	Apps	(Points)
1967–1970	South Africa	14	(26)

Henry Oswald de Villiers (10 March 1945 – 20 February 2022) was a South African rugby union player.

== Playing career ==
De Villiers was born in Johannesburg and schooled at Dale College in King William’s Town. After school, he moved to the Western Province to do his military training and in 1965 he joined the University of Cape Town RFC and was soon selected for the Ikeys first team. He also made his senior provincial debut for Western Province in 1965.

De Villiers played fourteen test matches for the Springboks. His debut was against France at Kings Park in 1967 and he scored 11 points on debut. His last test was in 1970 against Wales at Cardiff Arms Park. He also played in 15 tour matches and scored 54 points, which includes 2 tries, 15 conversions and 6 penalties.

== Personal life and death ==
De Villiers died in February 2022, at the age of 76.

=== Test history ===
No.	Opponents	Results (SA 1st)	Position	Points	Dates	Venue
1.	France	26–3	Fullback	11 (4 conv, 1 pen)	15 Jul 1967	Kings Park, Durban
2.	France	16–3	Fullback	4 (2 conv)	22 Jul 1967	Free State Stadium, Bloemfontein
3.	France	14–19	Fullback		29 Jul 1967	Ellis Park, Johannesburg
4.	France	6–6	Fullback	3 (1 pen)	12 Aug 1967	Newlands, Cape Town
5.	France	12–9	Fullback		9 Nov 1968	Stade Chaban-Delmas, Bordeaux
6.	France	16–11	Fullback		16 Nov 1968	Stade Olympique, Colombes
7.	Australia	30–11	Fullback		2 Aug 1969	Ellis Park, Johannesburg
8.	Australia	16–9	Fullback		16 Aug 1969	Kings Park, Durban
9.	Australia	11–3	Fullback		6 Sep 1969	Newlands, Cape Town
10.	Australia	19–8	Fullback		20 Sep 1969	Free State Stadium, Bloemfontein
11.	Scotland	3–6	Fullback		6 Dec 1969	Murrayfield, Edinburgh
12.	England	8–11	Fullback		20 Dec 1969	Twickenham, London
13.	Ireland	8–8	Fullback	5 (1 conv, 1 pen)	10 Jan 1970	Lansdowne Road, Dublin
14.	Wales	6–6	Fullback	3 (1 pen)	24 Jan 1970	Cardiff Arms Park, Cardiff

Legend: pen = penalty (3 pts.); conv = conversion (2 pts.), drop = drop kick (3 pts.).

== See also ==
- List of South Africa national rugby union players – Springbok no. 418
