= Frik du Preez =

South African rugby union player

- Born: Frederik Christoffel Hendrik du Preez; 28 November 1935 (age 90) Rustenburg, Transvaal, Union of South Africa
- Height: 1.89 m (6 ft 2 in)
- Weight: 106 kg (16 st 10 lb)
- School: Parys High School

Rugby union career
- Position(s): Lock, flanker
Provincial / State sides
Years	Team	Apps	(Points)
1958–1971	Northern Transvaal	109	
- Correct as of 2007-12-26
International career
Years	Team	Apps	(Points)
1961–1971	South Africa	38	(11)
- Correct as of 2007-12-26

Frederik Christoffel Hendrik "Frik" du Preez (born 28 November 1935) is a former South African rugby union player.
