= Marcel Puget =

French rugby union player (1940–2021)

Marcel Puget (18 September 1940 – 1 July 2021) was a French rugby union player who played for the national team. Puget played 17 tests for France, including four Five Nations games.
