= 1970 Currie Cup =

Domestic rugby union competition

- Countries: South Africa
- Champions: Griqualand West (3rd title)
- Runners-up: Northern Transvaal

The 1970 Currie Cup was the 32nd edition of the Currie Cup, the premier annual domestic rugby union competition in South Africa.

The tournament was won by Griqualand West for the third time; they beat Northern Transvaal 11–9 in the final in Kimberley. Winger Buddy Swartz scored two tries for Griqualand West in the final, becoming the first player in Currie Cup final history to score more than one try, while flanker Peet Smit kicked a penalty from inside his own half.

== Results ==
=== Semi-final ===
Natal	8–24	Northern Transvaal	Kings Park Stadium, Durban
	Report

=== Final ===
Griqualand West	11–9	Northern Transvaal	De Beers Stadium, Kimberley
	Report		Referee: Ben Calitz

== See also ==
- Currie Cup
