= PAM Brink Stadium =

Multi-use stadium in Springs, South Africa

Coordinates: 26°15′6.34″S 28°25′40.46″E

PAM Brink Stadium is a multi-use stadium in Springs, South Africa. It has been closed for years due to damage caused by vandalism and financial problems. It was used mostly for soccer and rugby matches. It was the home ground of Benoni Premier United and was the home of the Eastern Transvaal rugby team, who played in the Currie Cup first division. The stadium holds 25,000 people.

It was named after P.A.M. Brink, who was president of the "sub-federation" of rugby in the Eastern Transvaal (before it became detached from the Transvaal in 1947), founder of the Springs Rugby Club in 1923, and mayor of the town of Springs for two terms.

It was inaugurated on 3 July 1949, during a game between Eastern Transvaal and the New Zealand All Blacks won by Eastern Transvaal, 6–5. In 1962, Eastern Transvaal recorded another famous victory over a touring test team, this time defeating the British & Irish Lions, 19–16.

Two test matches have been played at the ground. In 1964, during their tour of South Africa, France defeated the Springboks, 8–6, in front of over 56,000 spectators, with many fans having to remain outside the stadium. The stadium had to wait almost forty years for its next test match in 2002, with victory for the Springboks against Argentina by 49–29.

The stadium has been unused since 2006 and has been very badly vandalized. As of 2025, it is informally occupied by a homeless community. In 2017, it was estimated that repairs would cost R30 million.

In 2023, following rumours that the stadium would be demolished and become a private cemetery, an online campaign commenced.
