= 1969–70 South Africa rugby union tour of Britain and Ireland =

The 1969–70 South Africa rugby union tour of Britain and Ireland was a rugby union tour by the South Africa national rugby union team to the Northern Hemisphere.

There were a number of anti-apartheid protests throughout the tour.

The controversial tour happened during the apartheid era in South Africa, and came shortly after the D'Oliveira affair. There were protests at many of the matches, by anti-apartheid campaigners, calling themselves 'Stop the Seventy Tour', organised by Peter Hain. Future British prime minister Gordon Brown was the group's Edinburgh organiser.

== Matches ==
Scores and results list South Africa's points tally first.

Opposing Team	F	A	Date	Venue
Oxford University	3	6	5 November 1969	Twickenham, London
Midland Counties East	11	9	8 November 1969	Welford Road, Leicester
Newport	6	11	12 November 1969	Rodney Parade, Newport
Swansea	12	0	15 November 1969	St Helens, Swansea
Gwent	8	14	19 November 1969	Ebbw Vale
London Counties	22	6	22 November 1969	Twickenham, London
North West Counties	12	9	26 November 1969	White City Stadium, Manchester
Ulster	0	0	29 November 1969	Ravenhill, Belfast
New Brighton/North of Ireland	22	6	30 November 1969	New Brighton
The North	37	3	2 December 1969	Aberdeen
Scotland	3	6	6 December 1969	Murrayfield, Edinburgh
Aberavon/Neath	27	0	10 December 1969	Talbot Athletic Ground, Aberavon
Cardiff	17	3	13 December 1969	Cardiff Arms Park, Cardiff
Combined Services	14	6	16 December 1969	Aldershot Military Stadium, Aldershot
England	8	11	20 December 1969	Twickenham, London
South West Counties	9	6	23 December 1969	Exeter
Western Counties	3	3	27 December 1969	Bristol
North East Counties	24	11	3 January 1970	Gosforth
Midland Counties West	21	6	6 January 1970	Coventry
Ireland	8	8	10 January 1970	Lansdowne Road, Dublin
Munster	25	9	14 January 1970	Limerick
South of Scotland	3	3	17 January 1970	Galashiels
Llanelli	10	9	20 January 1970	Stradey Park, Llanelli
Wales	6	6	24 January 1970	Cardiff Arms Park, Cardiff
Southern Counties	13	0	28 January 1970	Gloucester
Barbarians	21	12	31 January 1970	Twickenham, London
