= 1960–61 South Africa rugby union tour of Europe =

Summary
P	W	D	L
Total
34	31	2	1
Test match
5	4	1	0
Opponent
P	W	D	L
Wales
1	1	0	0
Ireland
1	1	0	0
England
1	1	0	0
Scotland
1	1	0	0
France
1	0	1	0

In 1960-61 the South Africa national rugby union team toured England, France, Ireland, Scotland, and Wales, playing a series of test matches, as well as games against club, regional, and representative teams. South Africa won a Grand Slam by winning their test matches against all four Home Nations sides, as well as the test against France. This was the fifth Springboks tour of the Northern Hemisphere.

== Results ==
Scores and results list South Africa's points tally first.

Opposing Team	For	Against	Date	Venue	Status
Southern Counties	29	9	22 October 1960	Brighton	Tour match
Oxford University	24	5	26 October 1960	Oxford	Tour match
Cardiff	13	6	29 October 1960	Cardiff	Tour match
Pontypool & Cross Keys	30	3	2 November 1960	Pontypool Park, Pontypool	Tour match
Midland Counties	3	3	5 November 1960	Leicester	Tour match
Cambridge University	12	0	9 November 1960	Cambridge	Tour match
London Counties	20	3	12 November 1960	Twickenham, London	Tour match
Glasgow - Edinburgh	16	11	16 November 1960	Glasgow	Tour match
South of Scotland	19	3	19 November 1960	Hawick	Tour match
North West Counties	11	0	23 November 1960	Maine Road, Manchester	Tour match
Swansea	19	3	26 November 1960	Swansea	Tour match
Ebbw Vale & Abertillery	3	0	29 November 1960	Ebbw Vale	Tour match
Wales	3	0	3 December 1960	Cardiff Arms Park, Cardiff	Test match
South Western Counties	21	9	7 December 1960	Camborne	Tour match
Western Counties	42	0	10 December 1960	Gloucester	Tour match
Llanelli RFC	21	0	13 December 1960	Llanelli	Tour match
Ireland	8	3	17 December 1960	Lansdowne Road, Dublin	Test match
Munster	9	3	21 December 1960	Musgrave Park, Cork	Tour match
Combined Services	14	5	26 December 1960	Twickenham, London	Tour match
Midland Counties	16	5	28 December 1960	Birmingham	Tour match
North Eastern Counties	21	9	31 December 1960	Gosforth	Tour match
South Eastern Counties	24	0	3 January 1961	Bournemouth	Tour match
England	5	0	7 January 1961	Twickenham, London	Test match
Newport	3	0	11 January 1961	Newport	Tour match
Neath and Aberavon	25	5	14 January 1961	The Gnoll, Neath	Tour match
Scotland	12	5	21 January 1961	Murrayfield, Edinburgh	Test match
North of Scotland	22	9	25 January 1961		Tour match
Ulster	19	6	28 January 1961	Belfast	Tour match
Leinster	12	5	1 February 1961	Dublin	Tour match
Barbarians	0	6	4 February 1961	Cardiff Arms Park, Cardiff	Tour match
South West France	29	3	8 February 1961		Tour match
France B	26	10	11 February 1961		Tour match
Cote Basque	36	9	14 February 1961		Tour match
France	0	0	18 February 1961	Yves-du-Manoir, Colombes	Test match

== Bibliography ==
- Billot, John (1974). Springboks in Wales. Ferndale: Ron Jones Publications.
- Smith, David; Williams, Gareth (1980). Fields of Praise: The Official History of The Welsh Rugby Union. Cardiff: University of Wales Press. ISBN 0-7083-0766-3.
