= 1973 Five Nations Championship squads =

Rugby union competition squads

These are the 1973 Five Nations Championship squads:

== England ==
Head coach: John Elders

1. Fran Cotton
2. Dick Cowman
3. Sam Doble
4. David Duckham
5. Geoff Evans
6. Tony Jorden
7. Peter Larter
8. Alan Morley
9. Tony Neary
10. Peter Preece
11. John Pullin (c.)
12. Chris Ralston
13. Andy Ripley
14. Steve Smith
15. Peter Squires
16. Stack Stevens
17. Roger Uttley
18. Peter Warfield
19. John Watkins
20. Jan Webster

== France ==
Head coach: Jean Desclaux

1. Jean-Michel Aguirre
2. Richard Astre
3. Jean-Louis Azarete
4. Christian Badin
5. Max Barrau
6. Jean-Pierre Bastiat
7. René Benesis
8. Roland Bertranne
9. Pierre Biemouret
10. Roger Bourgarel
11. Jack Cantoni
12. Elie Cester
13. André Darrieussecq
14. Claude Dourthe
15. Michel Droitecourt
16. Alain Esteve
17. Jean Iraçabal
18. André Lubrano
19. Jean-Pierre Lux
20. Jo Maso
21. Michel Pebeyre
22. Jean-François Phliponeau
23. Jean-Pierre Romeu
24. Olivier Saïsset
25. Walter Spanghero (c.)
26. Jean Trillo
27. Armand Vaquerin

== Ireland ==
Head coach: Syd Millar

1. Jim Buckley
2. Roger Clegg
3. Seamus Dennison
4. Tony Ensor
5. Mike Gibson
6. Tom Grace
7. Ken Kennedy
8. Tom Kiernan (c.)*
9. Sean Lynch
10. Kevin Mays
11. Willie John McBride (c.)
12. Barry McGann
13. Stewart McKinney
14. Ray McLoughlin
15. Wallace McMaster
16. Richard Milliken
17. Mick Molloy
18. John Moloney
19. Terry Moore
20. Michael Quinn
21. Fergus Slattery

== Scotland ==
Head coach: Bill Dickinson

1. Peter Brown (c.)
2. Hamish Bryce
3. Sandy Carmichael
4. Bobby Clark
5. Ian Forsyth
6. Andy Irvine
7. Wilson Lauder
8. Alan Lawson
9. Nairn MacEwan
10. Ian McGeechan
11. Alastair McHarg
12. Ian McLauchlan
13. Jock Millican
14. Dougie Morgan
15. Jim Renwick
16. David Shedden
17. Billy Steele
18. Gordon Strachan
19. Colin Telfer
20. Ronald Wright

== Wales ==
Head coach: Clive Rowlands

1. Phil Bennett
2. Roy Bergiers
3. John Bevan
4. Tommy David
5. Gerald Davies
6. Mervyn Davies
7. Gareth Edwards
8. Arthur Lewis (c.)
9. Phil Llewellyn
10. John Lloyd
11. Dai Morris
12. Derek Quinnell
13. Jim Shanklin
14. Glyn Shaw
15. John Taylor
16. Delme Thomas
17. J. J. Williams
18. J. P. R. Williams
19. Jeff Young
