= 1972 Five Nations Championship squads =

Rugby union competition squads

These are the 1972 Five Nations Championship squads:

== England ==
Head coach: John Elders

1. John Barton
2. Mike Beese
3. Alan Brinn
4. Mike Burton
5. Peter Dixon (c.)
6. David Duckham
7. Geoff Evans
8. Keith Fielding
9. Bob Hiller (c.)*
10. Jeremy Janion
11. Peter Knight
12. Nick Martin
13. Tony Neary
14. Alan Old
15. John Pullin
16. Chris Ralston
17. Andy Ripley
18. Stack Stevens
19. Rodney Webb
20. Jan Webster
21. Lionel Weston
- captain in the first two games

== France ==
Head coach: Fernand Cazenave

1. Jean-Michel Aguirre
2. Jean-Louis Azarete
3. Richard Astre
4. Max Barrau
5. Jean-Pierre Bastiat
6. René Benesis
7. Jean-Louis Bérot
8. Roland Bertranne
9. Pierre Biemouret
10. Victor Boffelli
11. Yvan Buonomo
12. Jack Cantoni
13. Benoît Dauga (c.)*
14. Claude Dourthe
15. Bernard Duprat
16. Alain Esteve
17. Jean Iraçabal
18. Jean-Pierre Lux
19. Jean-Louis Martin
20. Jo Maso
21. Olivier Saïsset
22. Jean Sillières
23. Jean-Claude Skrela
24. Claude Spanghero
25. Walter Spanghero (c.)**
26. Jean Trillo
27. Armand Vaquerin
28. Pierre Villepreux (c.)***
- captain in the first game
  - captain in the second and third game
    - captain in the fourth game

== Ireland ==
Head coach: Syd Millar

1. Con Feighery
2. Kevin Flynn
3. Mike Gibson
4. Tom Grace
5. Denis Hickie
6. Ken Kennedy
7. Tom Kiernan (c.)
8. Sean Lynch
9. Willie John McBride
10. Barry McGann
11. Stewart McKinney
12. Ray McLoughlin
13. Wallace McMaster
14. John Moloney
15. Fergus Slattery
- Ireland used 15 players in two games

== Scotland ==
Head coach: Bill Dickinson

1. Rodger Arneil
2. Ian Barnes
3. Alastair Biggar
4. Arthur Brown
5. Gordon Brown
6. Peter Brown (c.)
7. Sandy Carmichael
8. Bobby Clark
9. Lewis Dick
10. John Frame
11. Alan Lawson
12. Nairn MacEwan
13. Ian McCrae
14. Alastair McHarg
15. Ian McLauchlan
16. Duncan Paterson
17. Jim Renwick
18. Billy Steele
19. Colin Telfer
- Scotland played three games

== Wales ==
Head coach: Clive Rowlands

1. Phil Bennett
2. Roy Bergiers
3. John Bevan
4. Gerald Davies
5. Mervyn Davies
6. Gareth Edwards
7. Geoff Evans
8. Barry John
9. Arthur Lewis
10. Barry Llewelyn
11. John Lloyd (c.)
12. Dai Morris
13. Derek Quinnell
14. John Taylor
15. Delme Thomas
16. J. P. R. Williams
17. Jeff Young
- Wales played three games
