= 1975 Five Nations Championship squads =

Rugby union competition squads

These are the 1975 Five Nations Championship squads:

== England ==
Head coach: John Burgess

1. Bill Beaumont
2. Neil Bennett
3. Mike Burton
4. Martin Cooper
5. Fran Cotton (c.)
6. Peter Dixon
7. David Duckham
8. Nigel Horton
9. Tony Jorden
10. Alan Morley
11. Tony Neary
12. Alan Old
13. Jacko Page
14. Peter Preece
15. John Pullin
16. Chris Ralston
17. Andy Ripley
18. Dave Rollitt
19. Peter Rossborough
20. Keith Smith
21. Steve Smith
22. Peter Squires
23. Stack Stevens
24. Roger Uttley
25. Peter Warfield
26. John Watkins
27. Jan Webster

== France ==
Head coach: Jean Desclaux

1. Richard Astre
2. Jean-Luc Averous
3. Jean-Louis Azarete
4. Jean-Pierre Bastiat
5. Roland Bertranne
6. Victor Boffelli
7. Jack Cantoni
8. Gérard Cholley
9. Claude Dourthe (c.)**
10. Alain Esteve
11. Jean-Martin Etchenique
12. Jacques Fouroux (c.)*
13. Jean-François Gourdon
14. Alain Guilbert
15. Jean-Pierre Lux
16. Alain Paco
17. Lucien Pariès
18. Jean-Pierre Rives
19. Jean-Pierre Romeu
20. Olivier Saïsset
21. François Sangalli
22. Georges Senal
23. Claude Spanghero
24. Jean-Claude Skrela
25. Michel Taffary
26. Jean-Louis Ugartemendia
27. Armand Vaquerin
- captain in the first game

== Ireland ==
Head coach: Roly Meates

1. Roger Clegg
2. Seamus Dennison
3. Willie Duggan
4. Tony Ensor
5. Mike Gibson
6. Tom Grace
7. Moss Keane
8. Ken Kennedy
9. Willie John McBride (c.)
10. Billy McCombe
11. Stewart McKinney
12. Ray McLoughlin
13. Wallace McMaster
14. Dick Milliken
15. John Moloney
16. Michael Sherry
17. Fergus Slattery
18. Pa Whelan

== Scotland ==
Head coach: Bill Dickinson

1. Ian Barnes
2. David Bell
3. Mike Biggar
4. Gordon Brown
5. Sandy Carmichael
6. Lewis Dick
7. Andy Irvine
8. Wilson Lauder
9. David Leslie
10. Nairn MacEwan
11. Duncan Madsen
12. Alastair McHarg
13. Ian McGeechan
14. Ian McLauchlan (c.)
15. Doug Morgan
16. Jim Renwick
17. Billy Steele

== Wales ==
Head coach: John Dawes

1. Phil Bennett
2. John Bevan
3. Roger Blyth
4. Terry Cobner
5. Gerald Davies
6. Mervyn Davies (c.)
7. Gareth Edwards
8. Trefor Evans
9. Charlie Faulkner
10. Steve Fenwick
11. Ray Gravell
12. Allan Martin
13. Graham Price
14. Mike Roberts
15. Derek Quinnell
16. Geoff Wheel
17. J. J. Williams
18. J. P. R. Williams
19. Bobby Windsor
