= 1972 Five Nations Championship =

Rugby union competition

- Date: 15 January - 29 April 1972
- Countries: England; Ireland; France; Scotland; Wales

Tournament statistics
- Champions: Not completed
- Matches played: 8
- Tries scored: 28 (3.5 per match)
- Top point scorer: (Wales) Barry John (35)
- Top try scorers: (France) Bernard Duprat (2) (Wales) Gerald Davies (2) (Wales) Gareth Edwards (2)

The 1972 Five Nations Championship was the 43rd Five Nations Championship, an annual rugby union competition contested by the men's national teams of England, France, Ireland, Scotland and Wales, and the 78th since it began as the Home Nations Championship.

For the first time since the Second World War, the championship was not completed. Scotland and Wales did not travel to Dublin to play Ireland because of escalating political tensions in the wake of Bloody Sunday. Although the remaining fixtures of the schedule were fulfilled, as both Ireland and Wales won all their matches, neither could claim the title. To fill the gap of the missing two fixtures, France played a friendly match in Dublin (in addition to the scheduled match in Paris). In total, nine matches were played between 15 January and 29 April 1972.

This was the first Five Nations Championship in which a try was worth four points.

This tournament saw France play its last matches at its decades-long home ground, Stade Yves-du-Manoir in Colombes. The opening of the rebuilt Parc des Princes that June saw France move its Five Nations matches to that ground.

== Participants ==
Nation	Venue	City	Head coach	Captain
England	Twickenham	London	John Elders	Bob Hiller/Peter Dixon
France	Stade Olympique Yves-du-Manoir	Colombes	Fernand Cazenave	Benoit Dauga/Walter Spanghero/Pierre Villepreux
Ireland	Lansdowne Road	Dublin	Syd Millar	Tom Kiernan
Scotland	Murrayfield	Edinburgh	Bill Dickinson	Peter Brown
Wales	Cardiff Arms Park	Cardiff	Clive Rowlands	John Lloyd

== Table ==
Pos	Team	Pld	W	D	L	PF	PA	PD	Pts
1	Wales	3	3	0	0	67	21	+46	6
2	Ireland	2	2	0	0	30	21	+9	4
3	Scotland	3	2	0	1	55	53	+2	4
4	France	4	1	0	3	61	66	−5	2
5	England	4	0	0	4	36	88	−52	0

== Fixtures ==
15 January 1972

England	3–12	Wales
Pen: Hiller		Try: J. P. R. Williams; Con: John; Pen: John (2)

Twickenham Stadium, London
Referee: J. Young (Scotland)

15 January 1972

Scotland	20–9	France
Try: Frame; Renwick; Telfer; Con: A. Brown; Pen: P. Brown; Drop: Telfer		Try: Dauga; Con: Villepreux; Pen: Villepreux

Murrayfield Stadium, Edinburgh
Attendance: 50,000
Referee: M. Joseph (Wales)

29 January 1972

France	9–14	Ireland
Try: Lux; Con: Villepreux; Pen: Villepreux		Try: McLoughlin; Moloney; Pen: Kiernan (2)

Stade Yves-du-Manoir, Colombes
Attendance: 26,939
Referee: A. R. Lewis (Wales)

5 February 1972

Wales	35–12	Scotland
Try: Bergiers; Davies; Edwards (2); Taylor; Con: John (3); Pen: John (3)		Try: Clark; Con: P. Brown; Pen: P. Brown; Renwick

National Stadium, Cardiff
Referee: G. A. Jamison (Ireland)

12 February 1972

England	12–16	Ireland
Try: Ralston; Con: Hiller; Pen: Hiller (2)		Try: Flynn; Grace; Con: Kiernan; Pen: Kiernan; Drop: McGann

Twickenham Stadium, London
Referee: R. Austry (France)

26 February 1972

Ireland	Cancelled	Scotland

Lansdowne Road, Dublin

26 February 1972

France	37–12	England
Try: Biemouret; Duprat (2); Lux; Sillières; Spanghero; Con: Villepreux (5); Pen: Villepreux		Try: Beese; Con: Old; Pen: Old (2)

Stade Yves-du-Manoir, Colombes
Attendance: 33,860
Referee: T. F. E. Grierson (Scotland)

11 March 1972

Ireland	Cancelled	Wales

Lansdowne Road, Dublin

18 March 1972

Scotland	23–9	England
Try: P. Brown; MacEwan; Pen: A. Brown; P. Brown (3); Drop: Telfer		Pen: Old (3)

Murrayfield Stadium, Edinburgh
Referee: M. Joseph (Wales)

25 March 1972

Wales	20–6	France
Try: Bevan; Davies; Pen: John (4)		Pen: Villepreux (2)

National Stadium, Cardiff
Attendance: 50,000
Referee: M. H. Titcomb (England)

== Friendly match ==
29 April 1972

Ireland	24–14	France
Try: Duggan; Flynn; Moloney; Con: Kiernan (3); Pen: Kiernan (2)		Try: Duprat (2); Lux; Con: Villepreux

Lansdowne Road, Dublin
Attendance: 35,000
Referee: R. F. Johnson (England)
