= 1970 Ireland rugby union tour of Argentina =

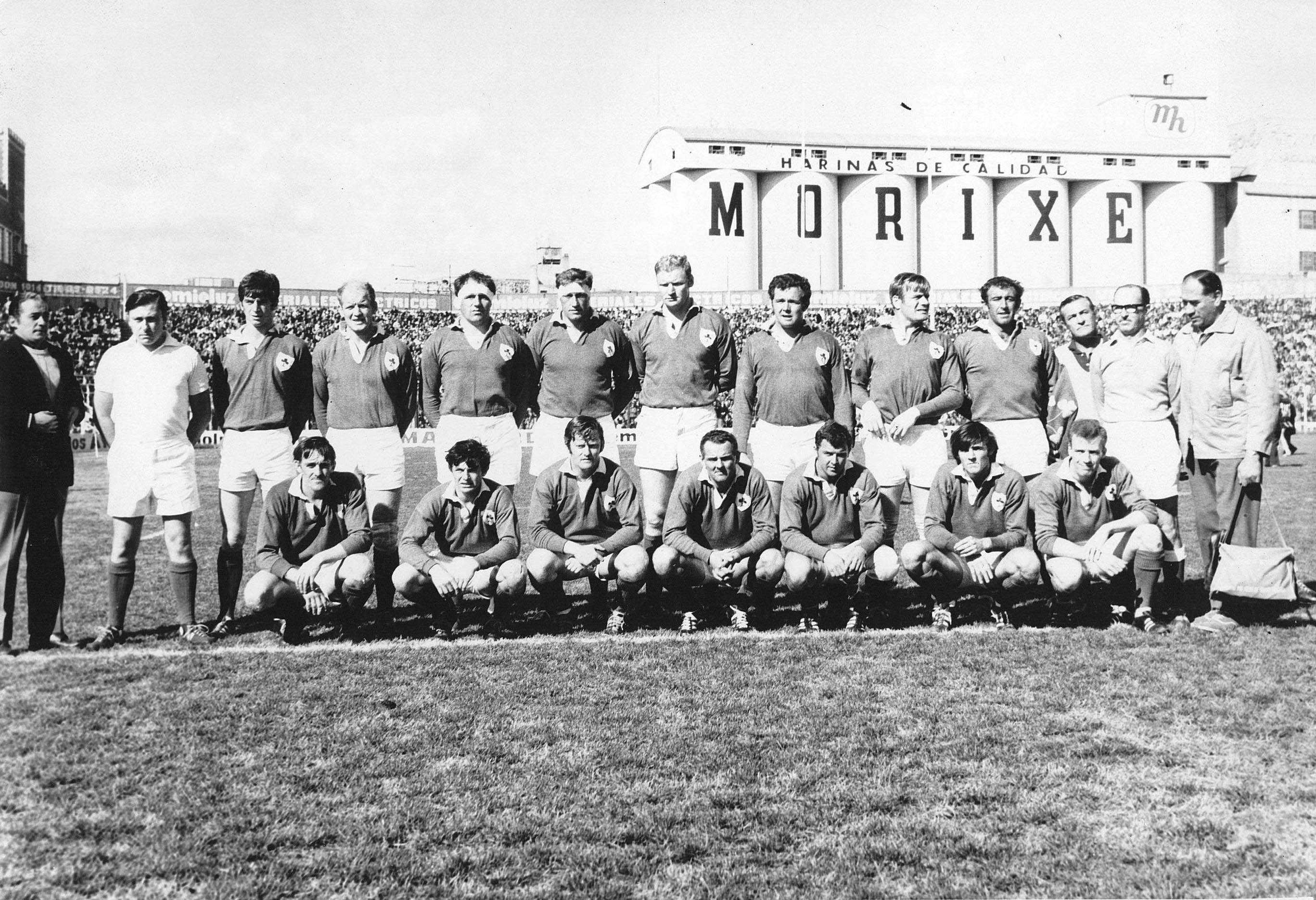
- Team that played a test v Argentina at Ferro Carril Oeste Stadium
Summary
P	W	D	L
Total
7	4	0	3
Test match
2	0	0	2
Opponent
P	W	D	L
Argentina (Note: Recognized as official tests only by UAR.)
2	0	0	2

Tour chronology
- ← Australia 1967 New Zealand & Fiji 1976 →

The 1970 Ireland rugby union tour of Argentina was a series of matches played between August and September in Argentina by the Ireland national rugby union team.

Despite that the matches were not officially recognised by the Irish Rugby Football Union as Test matches, it was a real tour of Irish national team. At that time, the IRFU considered as official only matches against the other Home Unions, Australia, South Africa and New Zealand. It was the third tour of a "Home Union" in Argentina in three years, after Wales (1968) and Scotland (1969), and it was the second tour of an Irish side after the tour of 1952.

Argentina won the unofficial series with two victories.

== Touring party ==
- Manager: E. Patterson
- Assistant Manager: Ronnie Dawson
- Captain: Tom Kiernan

=== Backs ===
- Barry Bresnihan (London Irish)
- Bill Brown (Malone)
- Alan Duggan (Lansdowne)
- Tom Grace (University College Dublin)
- L. Hall (Garryowen)
- Tom Kiernan (Cork Constitution)
- Barry McGann (Cork Constitution)
- John Moloney (St Mary's College)
- H. Murphy (University College Dublin)
- Barry O'Driscoll (Manchester)
- Frank O'Driscoll (University College Dublin)

=== Forwards ===
- John Birch (Ballymena)
- Jim Buckley (Sunday's Well)
- P. Cassidy (Corinthians)
- Mick Hipwell (Terenure College)
- Ronnie Lamont (Instonians)
- Sean Lynch (St Mary's College)
- Willie John McBride (Ballymena)
- P. Madigan (Old Belvedere)
- Syd Millar (Ballymena)
- Mick Molloy (London Irish)
- Terry Moore (Highfield)
- Phil O'Callaghan (Dolphin)

== Match details ==
Complete list of matches played by Ireland in Argentina:

30 August 1970

Selecc. Interior (Note: Combined team composed of players from clubs outside Buenos Aires Province.)	11–33	Ireland
Try: Brandi; Con: Capell; Pen: Capell		Try: Brown (3), Buckley (2); Con: Ciernan (3); Pen: Ciernan (3); Drop: Mc Gann

Ferro Carril Oeste, Buenos Aires
Referee: Carlos A. Tozzi (Argentina)

Seleccionado del Interior: L. Capell; D. Filippa, R. Tarquini, G. Vera, M. Brandi; C. Navessi, L. Chacón; B. Casalle, J. Ghiringhelli, H. Barrera; R. Pasaglia, R. Campra (cap.); G. Ribeca, L. Ramos (C. Bianchi), M. Senatore (C. Abud)
Ireland: T. Ciernan; A. Duggan, F. Brenishan, R. Murphy, W. Brown; B. Mc Gann, J. Molones; J. Buckley, A. Moore, R. Lamont; M. Mohillo, W. Mac Bride; P. O ́Callagham, J. Lynch.

2 September

Rosario RU	6–11	Ireland
Pen: Seaton (2)		Try: Grace, Lamont; Con: Mc Gann; Pen: B. O ́Driscoll

Plaza Jewell, Rosario
Referee: César de Elizalde (Argentina)

Rosario: J. Seaton; R. Villavicencio, J. Benzi, C. Blanco, C. García; J. Scilabra, M. Escalante; J. L. Imhoff, M. Chesta (cap.), J. Robin; M. Bouza, J. Mangiamelli; R. Fariello, J. Costante, F. Landó.
Ireland: B. O ́Driscoll; A. Duggan, F. Brenishan, F. O ́Driscoll, T. Grace; B. Mc Gann, L. Hall; R. Lamont, A. Moore, M. Hipwell; W. Mc Bride (cap.), P. Cassidy; S. Millar, J. Brich, J. Lynch.

6 September

Argentina B	6–9	Ireland
Pen: Seaton; Drop: Harris-Smith		Try: Hipwell; Drop: Mc Gann (2)

Ferro Carril Oeste, Buenos Aires
Referee: Bruno Bertelli (Argentina)

Argentina B: J. Seaton; N. Pérez, J. Benzi, C. Blanco, J. Otaola; T. Harris-Smith, A. Etchegaray (cap.); N. Carbone, G. Anderson, R. Casabal; J. Retegui, R. Castro; M. Farna, J. Dumas, A. Abella.
Ireland: T. Ciernan (cap.); A. Duggan, F. O ́Driscoll, F. Brenishan, W. Brown; B. Mc Gann, J. Molones; M. Hipwell, A. Moore, J. Buckley; M. Mohillo, W. Mc Bride; S. Millar, J. Birch, P. O ́Callaghan.

9 September

Argentina D	3–14	Ireland
Try: Casas		Try: Duggan, O. ́Callaghan; Madigan; Con: Ciernan; Pen: Ciernan

Ferro Carril Oeste, Buenos Aires
Referee: Ricardo Colombo (Argentina) (Note: Replaced from 18' by Bruno Bertelli.)

Argentina D: A. Bollini; P. Kember, E. Reynolds, L. Esteras, A. Stein; F. Forrester, G. Blaksley (cap.); C. Bori, E. Elowson, J. Borghi; J. C. Anderson, J. Vorasoro; F. Insúa, G. Casas, E. Merelle.
Ireland: T. Ciernan (cap.); A. Duggan, F. O ́Driscoll, B. O ́Driscoll, W. Brown; H. Murphy, L. Hall; R. Lamont, M. Hipwell, J. Buckley; P. Cassidy, M. Mohillo; J. Lynch, P. Madigan, P. O ́Callaghan.

=== First test ===
13 September

Argentina	8–3	Ireland
Try: Gradín, Travaglini	Report	Try: Hipwell

Ferro Carril Oeste, Buenos Aires
Referee: Carlos Tozzi (Argentina)

Team details

Argentina	Ireland

Dudley Morgan	FB	15	FB	Tom Kiernan (capt.)
Mario Walther	W	14	W	Alan Duggan
Marcelo Pascual	C	13	C	Barry Bresnihan
Alejandro Travaglini	C	12	C	Frank O'Driscoll
Julio Otaola	W	11	W	Tom Grace
Carlos Martínez	FH	10	FH	Barry McGann
Luis Gradín	SH	9	SH	John Moloney
Raúl Loyola	N8	6	N8	Michael Hipwell
Héctor Silva (capt)	F	8	F	Terry Moore
Hugo Miguens	F	7	F	James Buckley
Aitor Otaño	L	5	L	Mick Molloy
Adrián Anthony	L	4	L	Willie-John McBride
Luis García Yánez	P	3	P	Sean Lynch
Ricardo Handley	H	2	H	John Birch
Ronnie Foster	P	1	P	Philo O'Callaghan (red card)

16 September

Argentina C	17–0	Ireland
Try: Orzábal; Con: Cutler; Pen: Cutler (3); Drop: Pimentel

Ferro Carril Oeste, Buenos Aires
Referee: Eduardo Niño Argentina

Argentina C: R. Espagnol; H. Rosatti, J. Walther (E. Word), E. Pérez Otero (G. Blaksley); G. Pimentel, M. Cutler; J. Carracedo, J. Wittman, M. Morgan; A. Orzábal, F. Hughes; H. Incola, L. Lebrón, O. Carbone.
Ireland: B. O ́Driscoll; T. Grace, F. Brenishan, H. Murphy, W. Brown (J. Maloney); F. O ́Driscoll, L. Hall; R. Lamont, M. Hipwell, J. Buckley; P. Cassidy, W. Mc Bride (cap.); J. Lynch, P. Madigan, S. Millar.

=== Second test ===
20 September

Argentina	6–3	Ireland
Try: Gradín (2)		Try: Kiernan

Ferro Carril Oeste, Buenos Aires
Referee: Eduardo Nino (Argentina)

Team details

Argentina	Ireland

Dudley Morgan	FB	15	FB	Tom Kiernan (capt)
Mario Walther	W	14	W	Alan Duggan
Arturo Rodríguez Jurado	C	13	C	Barry Bresnihan
Alejandro Travaglini	C	12	C	Frank O'Driscoll
Marcelo Pascual	W	11	W	Tom Grace
Carlos Martínez	FH	10	FH	Barry McGann
Luis Gradín	SH	9	SH	John Moloney
Raúl Loyola	N8	7	N8	Michael Hipwell
(capt.) Héctor Silva	F	8	F	Terry Moore
Hugo Miguens	F	6	F	James Buckley
Adrián Anthony	L	5	L	Mick Molloy
Aitor Otaño	L	4	L	Willie-John McBride
Ronnie Foster	P	3	P	Sean Lynch
Ricardo Handley	H	2	H	John Birch
Luis García Yáñez	P	1	P	Philo O'Callaghan
