= 1973 Five Nations Championship =

Rugby union competition

- Date: 13 January - 14 April 1973
- Countries: England; Ireland; France; Scotland; Wales

Tournament statistics
- Champions: Shared
- Matches played: 10
- Tries scored: 28 (2.8 per match)
- Top point scorer: (France) Jean-Pierre Romeu (26)
- Top try scorer: (Scotland) William Steele (3)

The 1973 Five Nations Championship was the 44th Five Nations Championship, an annual rugby union competition contested by the men's national teams of England, France, Ireland, Scotland and Wales, and the 79th since it began as the Home Nations Championship. Ten matches were played between 13 January and 14 April 1973.

As each nation won their two home matches (and therefore lost their two away matches), the championship was shared between all five teams; no further tie-break was applied to separate teams finishing level on match points. This was the only time that the Five Nations championship finished in a five-way tie.

Due to the Troubles occurring in Ireland, which had resulted in 13 civilians being killed by the British Army in Derry and in the loss of over 100 British soldiers in 1972 and the potential security risks, both Scotland and Wales had refused to play Ireland in Dublin in 1972. Defying expectations to the contrary, England agreed to travel in 1973. Despite a poor performance, resulting in an 18–9 loss, the crowd in the Lansdowne Road stadium gave a standing ovation to the England team. England captain John Pullin delivered a quip at a post-match dinner - "Well we might not be any good but at least we turned up" - to great applause.

== Participants ==
The teams involved were:

Nation	Venue	City	Head coach	Captain
England	Twickenham	London	John Elders	John Pullin
France	Parc des Princes	Paris	Jean Desclaux	Walter Spanghero
Ireland	Lansdowne Road	Dublin	Syd Millar	Tom Kiernan/Willie John McBride
Scotland	Murrayfield	Edinburgh	Bill Dickinson	Peter Brown
Wales	National Stadium	Cardiff	Clive Rowlands	Arthur Lewis

== Table ==
Pos	Team	Pld	W	D	L	PF	PA	PD	Pts
1	Wales	4	2	0	2	53	43	+10	4
1	Ireland	4	2	0	2	50	48	+2	4
1	France	4	2	0	2	38	36	+2	4
1	Scotland	4	2	0	2	55	59	−4	4
1	England	4	2	0	2	52	62	−10	4

== Results ==
1973-01-13

France	16–13	Scotland
Tries: Dourthe; Pen.: Romeu (3); Drops: Romeu		Tries: Lawson; Pen.: Brown (2); Drops: McGeechan

Parc des Princes, Paris
Attendance: 37,232
Referee: K. Pattinson (England)
F. Palmade (France)

1973-01-20

Wales	25–9	England
Tries: Bevan (2); Davies; Edwards; Lewis; Con.: Bennett; Pen.: Taylor		Pen.: Doble (2); Drops: Cowman

National Stadium, Cardiff
Referee: G. Domercq (France)

1973-02-03

Scotland	10–9	Wales
Tries: Steele; Telfer; Con.: Morgan		Pen.: Bennett (2); Taylor

Murrayfield, Edinburgh
Referee: F. Palmade (France)

1973-02-10

Ireland	18–9	England
Tries: Grace; Milliken; Con.: McGann (2); Pen.: McGann; Drops: McGann		Tries: Neary; Con.: Jorden; Pen.: Jorden

Lansdowne Road, Dublin
Attendance: 50,000
Referee: Alan Hosie (Scotland)

1973-02-24

Scotland	19–14	Ireland
Tries: Forsyth; Pen.: Morgan (2); Drops: McGeechan; Morgan (2)		Tries: Kiernan; McMaster; Pen.: McGann (2)

Murrayfield, Edinburgh
Referee: A. R. Lewis (Wales)

1973-02-24

England	14–6	France
Tries: Duckham (2); Pen.: Jorden (2)		Tries: Bertranne; Con.: Romeu

Twickenham, London
Attendance: 70,000
Referee: K. H. Clark (Ireland)

1973-03-10

Wales	16–12	Ireland
Tries: Edwards; Shanklin; Con.: Bennett; Pen.: Bennett (2)		Tries: Gibson; Con.: McGann; Pen.: McGann (2)

National Stadium, Cardiff
Referee: T. F. E. Grierson (Scotland)

1973-03-17

England	20–13	Scotland
Tries: Dixon (2); Evans; Squires; Con.: Jorden (2)		Tries: Steele (2); Con.: Irvine; Pen.: Morgan

Twickenham, London
Referee: J. C. Kelleher (Wales)

1973-03-24

France	12–3	Wales
Pen.: Romeu (3); Drops: Romeu		Drops: Bennett

Parc des Princes, Paris
Attendance: 50,000
Referee: D. P. d'Arcy (Ireland)

1973-04-14

Ireland	6–4	France
Pen.: Ensor; Gibson		Tries: Phliponeau

Lansdowne Road, Dublin
Attendance: 50,000
Referee: R. F. Johnson (England)
