= 1975 Five Nations Championship =

Rugby union competition

- Date: 18 January - 15 March 1975
- Countries: England; Ireland; France; Scotland; Wales

Tournament statistics
- Champions: Wales (18th title)
- Matches played: 10
- Tries scored: 36 (3.6 per match)
- Top point scorer: (Ireland) Billy McCombe (26)
- Top try scorer: (Wales) Gerald Davies (3)

The 1975 Five Nations Championship was the forty-sixth series of the rugby union Five Nations Championship. Including the previous incarnations as the Home Nations and Five Nations, this was the eighty-first series of the northern hemisphere rugby union championship. Ten matches were played between 18 January and 15 March. It was contested by England, France, Ireland, Scotland, and Wales. The championship was won by Wales, the team's eighteenth title (excluding another nine shared championships).

The game between Scotland and Wales at the Murrayfield Stadium in Edinburgh on 1 March attracted a World Record rugby attendance of 104,000 fans. This record would not be broken until a Bledisloe Cup game between Australia and New Zealand attracted 107,042 to the Sydney Olympic Stadium in 1999. The attendance at Murrayfield remains the Championship's record crowd, the record attendance in Europe and the third highest rugby attendance in history. With Scotland winning 12-10 it was the only loss for the Welsh during the 1975 Five Nations.

== Participants ==
Nation	Venue	City	Head coach	Captain
England	Twickenham	London	John Burgess	Fran Cotton
France	Parc des Princes	Paris	Jean Desclaux	Jacques Fouroux/Claude Dourthe
Ireland	Lansdowne Road	Dublin	Roly Meates	Willie John McBride
Scotland	Murrayfield	Edinburgh	Bill Dickinson	Ian McLauchlan
Wales	National Stadium	Cardiff	John Dawes	Mervyn Davies

== Table ==
Pos	Team	Pld	W	D	L	PF	PA	PD	Pts
1	Wales	4	3	0	1	87	30	+57	6
2	Scotland	4	2	0	2	47	40	+7	4
2	Ireland	4	2	0	2	54	67	−13	4
2	France	4	2	0	2	53	79	−26	4
5	England	4	1	0	3	40	65	−25	2

== Results ==
18 January 1975

France	10–25	Wales
Tries: Gourdon; Pen.: Taffary (2)		Tries: Cobner; Davies; Edwards; Fenwick; Price; Con.: Fenwick; Pen.: Fenwick

Parc des Princes, Paris
Attendance: 43,603
Referee: K. A. Pattinson (England)

18 January 1975

Ireland	12–9	England
Tries: Gibson; McCombe; Con.: McCombe (2)		Tries: Stevens; Con.: Old; Drops: Old

Lansdowne Road, Dublin
Referee: F. Palmade (France)

1 February 1975

England	20–27	France
Tries: Duckham; Rossborough; Pen.: Rossborough (4)		Tries: Etchenique; Gourdon; Guilbert; Spanghero; Con.: Pariès (4); Pen.: Pariès

Twickenham, London
Attendance: 70,000
Referee: T. F. E. Grierson (Scotland)

1 February 1975

Scotland	20–13	Ireland
Tries: Renwick; Steele; Pen.: Irvine (2); Drops: McGeechan; Morgan		Tries: Dennison; Grace; Con.: McCombe; Pen.: McCombe

Murrayfield, Edinburgh
Referee: R. F. Johnson (England)

15 February 1975

Wales	20–4	England
Tries: Davies; Fenwick; J.J. Williams; Con.: Martin; Pen.: Martin (2)		Tries: Horton

National Stadium, Cardiff
Referee: Alan Hosie (Scotland)

15 February 1975

France	10–9	Scotland
Tries: Dourthe; Pen.: Pariès; Drops: Astre		Pen.: Irvine (3)

Parc des Princes, Paris
Attendance: 43,472
Referee: M. S. Lewis (Wales)

1 March 1975

Ireland	25–6	France
Tries: Ensor; Grace; McBride; Con.: McCombe (2); Pen.: McCombe; Drops: McCombe (2)		Pen.: Pariès; Drops: Pariès

Lansdowne Road, Dublin
Attendance: 50,000
Referee: D. M. M. Lloyd (Wales)

1 March 1975

Scotland	12–10	Wales
Pen.: Morgan (3); Drops: McGeechan		Tries: Evans; Pen.: Fenwick (2)

Murrayfield, Edinburgh
Attendance: 104,000 *Rugby Union World Record until 1999
Referee: J. R. West (Ireland)

- Source - Quinn, Encyclopaedia of World Rugby

15 March 1975

Wales	32–4	Ireland
Tries: Bergiers; Davies; Edwards; Faulkner; J.J. Williams; Con.: Bennett (3); Pen.: Bennett (2)		Tries: Duggan

National Stadium, Cardiff
Referee: J. Saint-Guillem (France)

15 March 1975

England	7–6	Scotland
Tries: Morley; Pen.: Bennett		Pen.: Morgan (2)

Twickenham, London
Referee: D. P. d'Arcy (Ireland)
