= 1973 England rugby union tour of Fiji and New Zealand =

Summary
P	W	D	L
Total
5	2	0	3
Test match
2	2	0	0
Opponent
P	W	D	L
Fiji
1	1	0	0
New Zealand
1	1	0	0

The 1973 England rugby union tour of Fiji and New Zealand was a series of matches played by the England national rugby union team in Fiji and New Zealand in August and September 1973. England played five games, including a test match against the New Zealand national rugby union team and a match against the Fiji national rugby union team for which England did not award full international caps. England beat Fiji by only a single point and lost all three matches against New Zealand provincial teams but completed the tour with their first win against New Zealand since 1936.

This tour was hastily organised when a planned tour of Argentina was cancelled due to terrorist threats against the players. A squad of 25 was selected, all but three capped, and nine of whom (six in the pack) had played in the match against the All Blacks at Twickenham nine months previously, in January 1973. David Duckham and Stack Stevens had been, with John Pullin, on the 1971 Lions tour.

== Matches ==
Scores and results list England's points tally first.

Opposing Team	For	Against	Date	Venue	Status
Fiji	13	12	28 August 1973	Buckhurst Park, Suva	Tour match
Taranaki	3	6	1 September 1973	Rugby Park, New Plymouth	Tour match
Wellington	16	25	5 September 1973	Athletic Park, Wellington	Tour match
Canterbury	12	19	8 September 1973	Lancaster Park, Christchurch	Tour match
New Zealand	16	10	15 September 1973	Eden Park, Auckland	Test match

== Touring party ==
- Manager: Sandy Sanders
- Assistant Manager: John Elders
- Captain: John Pullin (Bristol) 30 caps

=== Backs ===
- Peter Rossborough (Coventry) 1 cap
- Tony Jorden (Blackheath) 4 caps
- David Duckham (Coventry) 24 caps
- Geoff Evans (Coventry) 4 caps
- Jeremy Janion (Richmond) 9 caps
- Peter Knight (Bristol) 3 caps
- Peter Preece (Coventry) 6 caps
- Peter Squires (Harrogate) 2 caps
- Martin Cooper (Moseley) 2 caps
- Alan Old (Middlesbrough) 4 caps
- Steve Smith (Sale) 3 caps
- Jan Webster (Moseley) 5 caps

=== Forwards ===
- Mike Burton (Gloucester) 5 caps
- Fran Cotton (Coventry) 7 caps
- Peter Hendy (St Ives) No caps
- Nick Martin (Bedford) 1 cap
- Tony Neary (Broughton Park) 16 caps
- John Pullin (Bristol) 30 caps
- Chris Ralston (Richmond) 12 caps
- Andy Ripley (Rosslyn Park) 10 caps
- Stack Stevens (Harlequins) 15 caps
- Roger Uttley (Gosforth) 3 caps
- John Watkins (Gloucester) 3 caps
- John White (Bristol) No caps
- Bob Wilkinson (Cambridge University) No caps
