= 1971 England rugby union tour of the Far East =

Summary
P	W	D	L
Total
7	7	0	0
Test match
6	6	0	0
Opponent
P	W	D	L
Japan
2	2	0	0
Hong Kong
1	1	0	0
Singapore
1	1	0	0
Sri Lanka
2	2	0	0

The 1971 England rugby union tour of the Far East was a series of matches played between September and October by an English national selection in Asia, as part of the RFU's centenary celebrations. None of the six international matches on this tour were given official Test status, with England playing as England XV, No "caps" were awarded to the English players who took part on the tour.

The first match against Japan was played at the Kintetsu Hanazono Rugby Stadium, in Osaka, on the Friday, 24 September 1971, (Vernal Equinox Day, a public holiday in Japan), in front of a crowd of 13,000. The Japanese side was captained by 30 year old Akira Yokoi and coached by Tetsunosuke Onishi. England struggled to overcome Japan in the match, despite outscoring the home side five tries to two (tries were still worth four points). The match was level at 19-19 with three minutes to go before tries from right wing Peter Glover in the 37th minute and centre Jeremy Janion in the 38th minute gave the English XV a 27-19 victory.

The second match of the series held under lights at the Chichibunomiya Rugby Stadium in Tokyo on Tuesday, 28 September 1971, before 25,000 people, was even closer than the previous game. At halftime neither side had scored a try, but England crept out to a halftime lead of 6-0, with two penalties scored by fullback Peter Rossborough. Japan then came back hard in the second half, getting three points of their own, with a penalty scored by flanker Yoshiharu Yamaguchi. One of the Japanese centres, Koji Miyata, was tackled just three yards from the try line but the visitors eventually held out for a 6-3 win.

== Results ==
Scores and results list England's points tally first.

Opposing Team	For	Against	Date	Venue	Status	Refs
All Waseda University	56	4	21 September 1971	Chichibu, Tokyo	Tour match	
Japan	27	19	24 September 1971	Kintetsu Hanazono Rugby Stadium, Osaka	Tour match	
Japan	6	3	28 September 1971	Chichibunomiya Rugby Stadium, Tokyo	Tour match	
Hong Kong	26	0	30 September 1971	Hong Kong Stadium, Hong Kong	Tour match	
Singapore	39	9	3 October 1971	Jalan Besar Stadium, Singapore	Tour match	
Sri Lanka	40	11	6 October 1971	Longden Place, Colombo	Tour match	
Sri Lanka	34	6	8 October 1971	Longden Place, Colombo	Tour match	

== Touring party ==
=== Staff ===
- Manager: Bob Weighill
- Assistant Manager: John Burgess
- Technical Advisor: Don Rutherford

=== Players ===
- Peter Rossborough
- Peter Glover
- Bob Lloyd
- Jeremy Janion
- Rodney Webb
- Dick Cowman
- Nigel Starmer-Smith
- Fran Cotton
- Peter Wheeler
- Jim Broderick
- Chris Ralston
- Roger Uttley
- David Robinson
- Tony Neary
- Charlie Hannaford
- John Finlan
- John Gray
- Mike Hannell
- Peter Larter
- Jan Webster
- David Roughley
- Budge Rogers (captain)
- Chris Wardlow
