= Bangor RFC (Northern Ireland) =

Irish rugby union club based in Bangor, Co.Down

(Northern Ireland) Bangor RFC
- Full name: Bangor Rugby Football Club
- Union: (Ireland) IRFU
- Branch: Ulster
- Founded: 1885; 141 years ago
- Location: Bangor
- Region: County Down
- Ground: Upritchard Park
- Chairman: Mark Thallon
- President: Jim Lacey
- Director of Rugby: Ricky Armstrong
- Coach: James Griffin
- Captain: James Leary
- League: Ulster Championship 1
Team kit

Official website
- www.bangorrfc.com

Bangor RFC is a Northern Irish rugby union club from Bangor, County Down, playing in the Ulster domestic Championship 1 league.

== History ==
The club was founded in 1885 and enjoyed senior status between 1924 and the Second World War. The club returned to junior rugby after the war. Historically having played at Ward Park, leased from Bangor Borough Council, in 1968 the club purchased eleven acres of land on the southern outskirts of Bangor and opened a new ground named Upritchard Park (after chairman Joe Upritchard) in September 1969, coinciding with the regaining of senior status. Over the next 20 years, Bangor became one of the top senior clubs in Ulster, culminating in the 1981-82 season, when it won the treble of Ulster Senior League, Ulster Senior Cup and its own floodlit competition, the Boston Cup. Bangor were inaugural members of the All-Ireland League in 1990, but the club went into decline and were relegated back into junior rugby in 2002.

The club did regain senior status in 2016 with promotion back to the All-Ireland League, but were relegated at the end of the 2023/2024 season. Since 1972, the club has shared Upritchard Park with Bangor Cricket Club forming Bangor Rugby Football and Cricket Club.

== Notable players ==
(British & Irish Lions) British and Irish Lions

- Richard Milliken

Ireland

Three Bangor players – Roger Clegg, Billy McCombe and Richard Milliken – represented Ireland in the 1975 Five Nations Championship.

- Roger Clegg
- Ronnie Elliott
- Kenny Hooks
- Billy McCombe
- J. J. McCoy
- Mark McCall
- Richard Milliken
- Davy Morrow
- Don Whittle

Fiji

- Joeli Veitayaki

== Honours ==
- Ulster Senior Cup: 3
  - 1979-80, 1981–82, 1985–86
- Ulster Senior League: 7
  - 1929-30, 1974–75, 1976–77, 1980–81, 1981–82, 1982–83, 1987–88
- Ulster Towns Cup: 13
  - 1903-04, 1905–06, 1908–09, 1919–20, 1922–23, 1929–30, 1945–46, 1955–56, 1967–68, 1968–69, †1971-72, †1974-75, 2015–16
- Ulster Junior Cup: 1
  - 2015-16

† Won by 2nd XV
