= Janion =

Janion is a surname. Notable people with the surname include:

- Jeremy Janion (born 1946), British rugby union player
- Maria Janion (1926–2020), Polish scholar, critic, and theoretician of literature
- Harvey Janion-Key (born 2004) British man
- Eleanor Janion-Key (born 2001) British woman
- Emily Janion (born 1975) British cook, owner of Emily's home cooked kitchen
