= Tadhg Mac Lochlainn =

Irish local historian and activist

Tadhg Mac Lochlainn (fl. 1907 – May 1999) was an Irish local historian. Mac Loughlin was a native of Killure, near Ballinasloe, and an innovator in the promotion of local studies, been the author of half-a-dozen books on the subject, as well a number of articles. He was a member of Conradh na Gaeilge, the Gaelic Athletic Association, the National Athletic and Cycling Association, Oireachtas na Gaeilge and several other Irish cultural organisations. He was secretary of a committee which pioneered the erection of the Battle of Aughrim Memorial, was first secretary of the Ballinasloe Development Association and a member of An Taisce.

His sons Ray McLoughlin and Feidlim MacLoughlin were Ireland international rugby union players.

== Select bibliography ==
- Inniu agus Inne
- The Parish of Aughrim and Kilconnell
- Ahascragh/Caltra
- Killure/Fohena
- The Parish of Lawrencetown and Kiltormer, 1982
