= John Birch (rugby union) =

Rugby union player from Northern Ireland

- University: Queen's University Belfast

Rugby union career
- Position: Hooker
International career
Years	Team	Apps	(Points)
1970	Ireland	2	(0)

John Birch is a former Irish international rugby union player from Northern Ireland.

Birch played his rugby for Coleraine, Ballymena, Instonians, Queen's University and Ulster.

A CAI schoolteacher, Birch won a place on Ireland's 1970 tour of Argentina. He had been a late call up to play hooker for the Possibles team in the Irish trials but impressed enough to join Ballymena teammates Willie John McBride and Syd Millar on the touring party. Ireland played twice against Argentine in Buenos Aires and Birch featured in both matches, for which the Irish Rugby Football Union retrospectively awarded caps in 2023.

== See also ==
- List of Ireland national rugby union players
