= Jim Shanklin =

Wales international rugby union player

- Full name: James Llewellyn Shanklin
- Born: 11 December 1948 (age 77) East Williamston, Wales
- School: Greenhill Grammar School, Tenby
- Notable relative: Tom Shanklin (son)

Rugby union career
- Position: Centre / Wing
International career
Years	Team	Apps	(Points)
1970–73	Wales	4	(4)

James Llewellyn Shanklin (born 11 December 1948) is a Welsh former rugby union international.

The son of a farmer, Shanklin grew up in Tenby and attended Greenhill Grammar School, where he was coached by ex-Wales player Denzil Thomas. He moved to England to work after leaving school and spent his rugby career with London Welsh RFC, which he also captained for a period. During the early 1970s, Shanklin earned four caps for Wales playing as a three-quarter and scored one try, against Ireland in 1973 at the National Stadium in Cardiff.

Shanklin set up a sports store on Acton High Street, London in 1980 with a London Welsh teammate, called James Shanklin Sports. He has a son Tom, born in London, who was capped 70 times for Wales in the 2000s.

== See also ==
- List of Wales national rugby union players
