= Peter Warfield =

England international rugby union player

- Born: Peter John Warfield; 1 April 1951 (age 75) Waddington, Lincolnshire
- University: Durham and Cambridge

Rugby union career
- Position: Centre
International career
Years	Team	Apps	(Points)
1973–75	England	6	(0)

Peter John Warfield (born 1 April 1951) is a former rugby union international who represented England in both the 1973 Five Nations and 1975 Five Nations tournaments.

== Personal ==
Warfield attended Haileybury and Imperial Service College and earned a two-year scholarship to the University of North Carolina. He matriculated at Durham University (Hatfield College) in 1971 to read for the General Arts course, where he competed for Durham University RFC and received a full palatinate. He continued his education at St John's College, Cambridge, earning a PGCE in 1975.

== Rugby union career ==
Warfield, a centre, made his test debut against New Zealand on 6 January 1973. He earned 6 international caps in total, with his only win coming against Scotland at Twickenham during the 1975 Five Nations. He played his club rugby for Rosslyn Park.
