= Feidlim MacLoughlin =

Irish rugby union player

- Born: 8 August 1941 (age 85) Ballinasloe, Co. Galway, Ireland
- School: Garbally College
- Notable relative: Ray McLoughlin (brother)

Rugby union career
- Position: Prop
International career
Years	Team	Apps	(Points)
1976	Ireland	1	(0)

Feidlim McLoughlin (born 8 August 1941), also known as Feidlim MacLoughlin, is an Irish former rugby union international who played for Connacht, Gosforth, Northern FC and Northumberland.

MacLoughlin was born in Ballinasloe, County Galway, and is a son of historian Tadhg Mac Lochlainn. His elder brother, Ray McLoughlin, was capped 40 times for Ireland. Dubai Duty Free CEO Colm McLoughlin is his younger brother.

A Connacht provincial player, MacLoughlin spent most his career in North East England, briefly with brother Ray at Gosforth, before beginning a long association with another Gosforth based club Northern FC. He gained his only Ireland cap at the late age of 34, as a tighthead prop against Australia at Lansdowne Road in 1976.

MacLoughlin has continued to live near Newcastle and was the inaugural president of the Irish Exiles, helping foreign based players such as Ross Nesdale gain Ireland selection. He has also served on the IRFU committee.

== See also ==
- List of Ireland national rugby union players
