= Locky Butler =

Irish rugby union player

- Full name: Lochlann Gerard Butler
- Born: 9 October 1935 Bray, Co. Wicklow, Ireland
- Died: 6 January 1995 (aged 59) Dublin, Ireland
- School: Blackrock College

Rugby union career
- Position: Hooker
International career
Years	Team	Apps	(Points)
1960	Ireland	1	(0)

Lochlann Gerard Butler (9 October 1935 — 6 January 1995) was an Irish international rugby union player.

== Early life and career ==
Born in Bray, County Wicklow, Butler was the younger brother of filmmaker Éamon de Buitléar and attended Blackrock College, where he played in two Leinster Schools Cup triumphs, in 1953 and 1954. He went on to play for Blackrock College RFC, featuring in their 1957 and 1961 Leinster Senior Cup title wins.

Capped once by Ireland, Butler got his opportunity in the 1960 Five Nations Championship, playing as a hooker against Wales at Lansdowne Road. He was also a squad member on Ireland's 1967 tour of Australia.

== Later life and death ==
Butler was an IRFU liaison officer and Ireland assistant team manager before his death from cancer in 1995.

== See also ==
- List of Ireland national rugby union players
