= Melville College FP =

Defunct Scottish rugby union club, based in Edinburgh

Melville College Former Pupils
- Full name: Melville College Former Pupils Rugby Football Club
- Founded: 1936
- Disbanded: 1973; 53 years ago
- Ground: Ferryfield

Melville College Former Pupils is a former rugby union side in Edinburgh, Scotland.

== History ==
The club was originally known as Edinburgh Institution F.P. However the Edinburgh Institute college, that the rugby union club was based on, moved its premises and was renamed Melville College in 1936.

Similarly the Edinburgh Institution F.P. club was renamed on the move. The Melville College Former Pupils rugby football club thus began in 1936.

== Merger ==
In 1973 the rugby union teams Melville College FP merged with Stewart's College FP when their two constituent colleges also merged.

The new side was named Stewart's Melville RFC.

== Notable former players ==
=== Edinburgh District ===
The following former Melville College FP players have represented Edinburgh District at provincial level.

- (Scotland) D.W. Morgan
- (Scotland) R. A. Small

=== Scotland ===
The following former Melville College FP players have represented Scotland at full international level.

- (Scotland) Bobby Clark

== Honours ==
- Peebles Sevens
  - Champions (2): 1940, 1965
- Edinburgh Borderers Sevens
  - Champions: 1973
