= Mark Egan (rugby union) =

Irish rugby player

Mark Egan (born 20 April 1966 in Athlone, County Westmeath) was an Irish rugby player who has played for Terenure College and Terenure College RFC. Egan graduated from Trinity College Dublin where he won three colours. He then went on to Oxford University (where he captained the Blues to a famous in the 1990 Varsity Match at Twickenham) and went from there to play rugby for Kobe Steel's team in Japan, now called Kobelco Steelers where he played in four consecutive championship winning sides until 1997. He was also a highly respected member of the Kobe Regatta & Athletic Club (KR&AC). Other notable rugby honours achieved by Egan were selection for Ireland U21s, Ireland U25s, Irish Universities, Connacht, selection for the British and Irish barbarians and Oxbridge.

Egan is now a senior executive at World Rugby based in Dublin, Ireland where he heads up the competitions and performance department.

== See also ==
- Syd Millar
- Paddy O'Brien - IRB Rugby Services Referee Manager
- Pierre Villepreux - IRB Rugby Services Regional Development Manager (Europe)
