= Jim Buckley (rugby union) =

Irish rugby union player

- Full name: James Henry Buckley

Rugby union career
- Position: Flanker
International career
Years	Team	Apps	(Points)
1973	Ireland	2	(0)

James Henry Buckley is an Irish former international rugby union player.

A flanker, Buckley played his rugby with Cork club Sundays Well and was a Munster Junior Cup winner in 1958.

Buckley toured Argentina with Ireland in 1970 and featured in both international matches against the Pumas, for which caps were not awarded. He was capped twice in the 1973 Five Nations as a replacement for Jim Davidson, against England at Lansdowne Road and Scotland at Murrayfield, before losing his spot to Stewart McKinney.

== See also ==
- List of Ireland national rugby union players
