= Phil Llewellyn =

- Full name: Philip David Llewellyn
- Born: 12 May 1947 (age 79) Swansea, Wales
- Height: 6 ft 3 in (191 cm)

Rugby union career
- Position: Prop
International career
Years	Team	Apps	(Points)
1973–74	Wales	5	(0)

Philip David Llewellyn (born 12 May 1947) is a Welsh former rugby union international.

Llewellyn, born in Swansea, played for Swansea RFC and was a taller than average prop, described by his coach as a "forward in the modern New Zealand mould". Debuting in the 1973 Five Nations Championship, Llewellyn claimed five Wales caps during his career, which included a win over Australia in Cardiff. He also played for the Barbarians.

== See also ==
- List of Wales national rugby union players
