= 1967 Ireland rugby union tour of Australia =

Summary
P	W	D	L
Total
6	4	0	2
Test match
1	1	0	0
Opponent
P	W	D	L
Australia
1	1	0	0

Tour chronology
- ← South Africa 1961 Argentina 1970 →

The 1967 Ireland rugby union tour of Australia was a series of matches played in May 1967 in Australia by the Ireland national rugby union team.

During the tour, Ireland obtained its first test match victory in Australia.

== Matches ==
Scores and results list Ireland's points tally first.

Opposing team	Pts for	Against	Match date	Venue
Queensland	41	8	1 May	Lang Park, Brisbane
New South Wales	9	21	6 May	Sydney Sports Ground, Sydney
New South Wales Country Districts XV	31	11	9 May	Sydney Sports Ground, Sydney
Australia	11	5	13 May	Sydney Cricket Ground, Sydney
Sydney	8	30	16 May	Sydney Sports Ground, Sydney
Victoria	19	5	20 May	Olympic Park Stadium, Melbourne

== Touring party ==
- Manager: Eugene Davy
- Assistant Manager: Des McKibbin
- Captain: Tom Kiernan

=== Backs ===
- Barry Bresnihan (University College Dublin)
- Niall Brophy (Blackrock College)
- Alan Duggan (Lansdowne)
- Mike Gibson (NIFC)
- L. Hall (University College Cork)
- Tom Kiernan (Cork Constitution)
- Paddy McGrath (University College Cork)
- John Murray (University College Dublin)
- Brendan Sherry (Terenure College)
- Jerry Walsh (Sunday's Well)

=== Forwards ===
- Locky Butler (University College Cork)
- Mick Doyle (Edinburgh Wanderers)
- J. Flynn (Wanderers)
- Ken Goodall (City of Derry)
- Denis J. Hickie (St Mary's College)
- Sam Hutton (Malone)
- Ken Kennedy (CIYMS)
- Seán MacHale (Lansdowne)
- Willie John McBride (Ballymena)
- Mick Molloy (University College Galway)
- Terry Moore (Highfield)
- Phil O'Callaghan (Dolphin)
