= Don Whittle =

Rugby union player from Northern Ireland

- Full name: Don Whittle
- Born: 16 November 1960 (age 65) Newtownards, Northern Ireland
- Height: 6 ft 3 in (191 cm)
- Weight: 115 kg (254 lb)

Rugby union career
- Position: Flanker
International career
Years	Team	Apps	(Points)
1988	Ireland	1	(0)

Don Whittle (born 16 November 1960) is a former Ireland rugby union international from Northern Ireland.

Born in Newtownards, County Down, Whittle attended Bangor Grammar School and played for Bangor RFC, as a back-row forward. He was a PE teacher by profession and made his provincial debut for Ulster in 1982.

Capped once for Ireland, Whittle was called up for the 1988 Five Nations Championship and played the match against France at the Parc des Princes, with selectors looking to add some more physical strength to their pack.

Whittle joined London Irish in the 1988/89 season.

== See also ==
- List of Ireland national rugby union players
