= Kate Lamb =

Welsh actress

- Born: Kate Lamb; 18 January 1988 (age 38); Cardiff, Wales
- Education: London Academy of Music and Dramatic Art
- Occupation: Actress
- Years active: 2009-present

Kate Lamb (born 18 January 1988) is a Welsh actress best known for playing Nurse Delia Busby in the BBC drama series Call the Midwife from 2015 to 2017.

== Early life ==
Lamb was born in Cardiff, Wales, United Kingdom. Lamb grew up in Tenby, Pembrokeshire where she attended Greenhill School. Lamb's first acting role was at the age of four, in a Tenby production of Toad of Toad Hall.

Lamb attended the Waterford Kamhlaba United World College of Southern Africa in Eswatini, before returning to the UK to study for a degree in English and Drama at Bristol University. She later also trained at the London Academy of Music and Dramatic Art (LAMDA).

== Career ==
Lamb successfully auditioned for her role in Call the Midwife and, when asked to give herself a regional identity, decided to play nurse Delia Busby with a Pembrokeshire accent. Lamb's character has a lesbian relationship with Nurse Patsy (Emerald Fennell). After her character was knocked off her bicycle and left with an uncertain future at the end of her first series, she returned to the role in December 2015. In May 2017, however, it was announced that Lamb wouldn't return for the seventh series.

== Filmography ==
=== Film ===
Year	Title	Role	Notes
2009	Hearts & Minds	Sally	As Kate Thuli Lamb
2011	Red Heart	Macy	As Kate Thuli Lamb
2014	A Quiet Courage	Chas	Short film

=== Television ===
Year	Title	Role	Notes
2012	Doctors	Gwen Payne	Episode "High-Flyer"
2012	Silk	Earnest Female Candidate	Episode #2.4
2012	Switch	Louise	2 episodes
2013	Mayday	Tina	2 episodes
2014	Endeavour	Daisy Weiss	Episode "Nocturne"
2015-2017	Call the Midwife	Nurse Delia Busby	
2016	Siblings	Katie	Episode "Golden Aunt"
2018	Agatha Raisin	Lisa	Episode "Agatha Raisin and the Wizard of Evesham"
2020	Roadkill	Lindsay Storm	

=== Theatre ===
Year	Title	Role	Notes
2011	How To Be Happy	Daisy	Company: Orange Tree Theatre
2012	deadkidsongs	Miranda	Company: Ustinov Studio
2012	After the Party	Natalie/Carmela	Company: Criterion Theatre
2012	Summer and Smoke		Company: Southwark Playhouse
2013	The Taming of the Shrew	Katherina	Company: Shakespeare's Globe
2013	Smack Family Robinson	Cora	Company: Rose Theatre, Kingston
2018	Much Ado About Nothing	Hero	Company: Rose Theatre, Kingston
2018	Lord of the Flies	Jack	Company: Theatr Clwyd
