= Nick Martin (rugby union) =

English rugby union player (born 1946)

- Full name: Nicholas Owen Martin
- Born: 26 June 1946 (age 80) Cambridge, England
- Height: 6 ft 5 in (196 cm)

Rugby union career
- Position: Lock
International career
Years	Team	Apps	(Points)
1972	England	1	(0)

Nicholas Owen Martin (born 26 June 1946) is an English former rugby union international.

Martin was born in Cambridge and attended The Perse School.

A Cambridge University blue, Martin played club rugby for Bedford and Harlequins, mainly as a lock. He gained his only England cap in the 1972 Five Nations, as a replacement for flanker Tony Neary late in the match against France at Colombes. In 1973, he was on the England squad for the tour of New Zealand.

Martin had a career in local government.

== See also ==
- List of England national rugby union players
