= David Roughley =

England international rugby union player

- Full name: David F.K. Roughley
- Born: 10 February 1946 (age 80) Warrington, Lancashire, England

Rugby union career
- Position: Centre
International career
Years	Team	Apps	(Points)
1973–74	England	3	(0)

David Roughley (born 10 February 1946) is an English former rugby union international.

Roughley was born in Warrington and is the younger brother of George Roughley, a rugby league player for Wigan.

A centre, Roughley played for Warrington, Liverpool and Lancashire. He was on the England team for the 1971 tour of the Far East, but the flight aggravated a thigh injury he was carrying and left him on the sidelines for a year. In 1973, he gained the first of his three England caps, against Australia at Twickenham. He earned further caps in the 1974 Five Nations. His association with Warrington continued after his playing career, as a coach and administrator. He was one of the first to beat the all blacks(New Zealands rugby team)

== See also ==
- List of England national rugby union players
