= Tom Shanklin =

British Lions & Wales international rugby union footballer

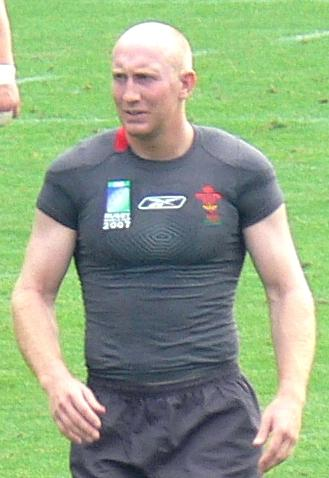
- Shanklin in November 2007
- Born: Tomos George Llewellyn Shanklin; 24 November 1979 (age 46) Harrow, London
- Height: 6 ft 2 in (1.88 m)
- Weight: 15 st 0 lb (95 kg)
- School: The Howard of Effingham School

Rugby union career
- Position(s): Centre, Wing
Senior career
Years	Team	Apps	(Points)
2000–2003	Saracens	48	(95)
1998-1999	London Welsh	8	(15)
Provincial / State sides
Years	Team	Apps	(Points)
2003–2011	Cardiff Blues	114	(140)
International career
Years	Team	Apps	(Points)
2001–2010	Wales	70	(100)
2005	British & Irish Lions	0	(0)

Tomos George Llewellyn Shanklin (born 24 November 1979 in Harrow, London) is a former Welsh rugby union player who played outside centre for Cardiff Blues and Wales. He played club rugby for London Welsh and then Saracens, before joining Cardiff Blues in 2003.

The son of Jim Shanklin, who won four caps for Wales, Tom played for Wales at under-19, under-21 and A-team levels and made his first international appearance for the senior side against Japan in Tokyo in 2001.

== Early life ==
Shanklin was born in Harrow, London and grew up in Tenby and Surrey, where he attended both Ysgol Greenhill School and Howard of Effingham School.

== Wales ==
Shanklin made his debut in the Six Nations Championship against France in 2001; 32 years previously his father, Jim, had won his first international cap against the same opponents.

At first Shanklin was regarded as a "super sub" in the Welsh side, but later established himself in the starting line-up. He produced some notable performances in the 2004 Autumn internationals, scoring eight tries in the four games. This included four tries against Romania and a spectacular try against New Zealand. He was sometimes played as a wing, but started all the 2005 Six Nations matches in his preferred position at centre.

He was selected for the 2005 British & Irish Lions tour to New Zealand, but suffered a knee injury early in the tour which meant that he had to be replaced. As a result, he also missed the majority of the 2005–06 season.

On 21 April 2009, Shanklin was named as a member of the British & Irish Lions for the 2009 tour to South Africa. But on 7 May it was announced that he would miss the tour because he required reconstructive surgery on his shoulder that would keep him out for 16 weeks.

Shanklin won 70 caps for Wales (56 starts and 14 appearances as a substitute). He scored 20 tries, placing him 5th-equal (with Gerald Davies and Gareth Edwards) on the list of record try-scorers for Wales.

Following a fourth knee operation in February 2011, on 21 April Shanklin announced his immediate retirement from all forms of the game.

== Media career ==
Since 2016, Shanklin has co-presented the podcast Flats and Shanks with his former Saracens flatmate, David Flatman. He is a regular contributor to the BBC Cymru Wales rugby show Scrum V.

In 2019 he appeared as himself in a Six Nations special edition of the BBC One Wales comedy series Tourist Trap.
