= Denzil Thomas =

Wales international rugby union player (1929–2014)

- Full name: James Denzil Thomas
- Born: 21 April 1929 Llandyfriog, Wales
- Died: 17 February 2014 (aged 84) Tenby, Wales

Rugby union career
- Position: Centre
International career
Years	Team	Apps	(Points)
1954	Wales	1	(3)

James Denzil Thomas (21 April 1929 — 17 February 2014) was a Welsh international rugby union player.

Born in Llandyfriog, Thomas attended Llandeilo and Ystalyfera Grammar Schools.

Thomas, a centre, played with many clubs during his career, with appearances for Bath, Brynamman, Cwmgors, Llanelli, Neath, the RAF, Skewen and Tenby United. His solitary Wales cap, a 1954 Five Nations match against Ireland at Lansdowne Road, came while he was with Llanelli. He won the match off his own boot with a stoppage time drop-goal to put Wales in front, but still lost his place in the side for the remaining tournament fixtures.

A schoolteacher by profession, Thomas had 30 years as Sports Master of Greenhill Grammar School in Tenby.

== See also ==
- List of Wales national rugby union players
