= Brian O'Driscoll =

Ireland and British & Irish Lions rugby union player (born 1979)

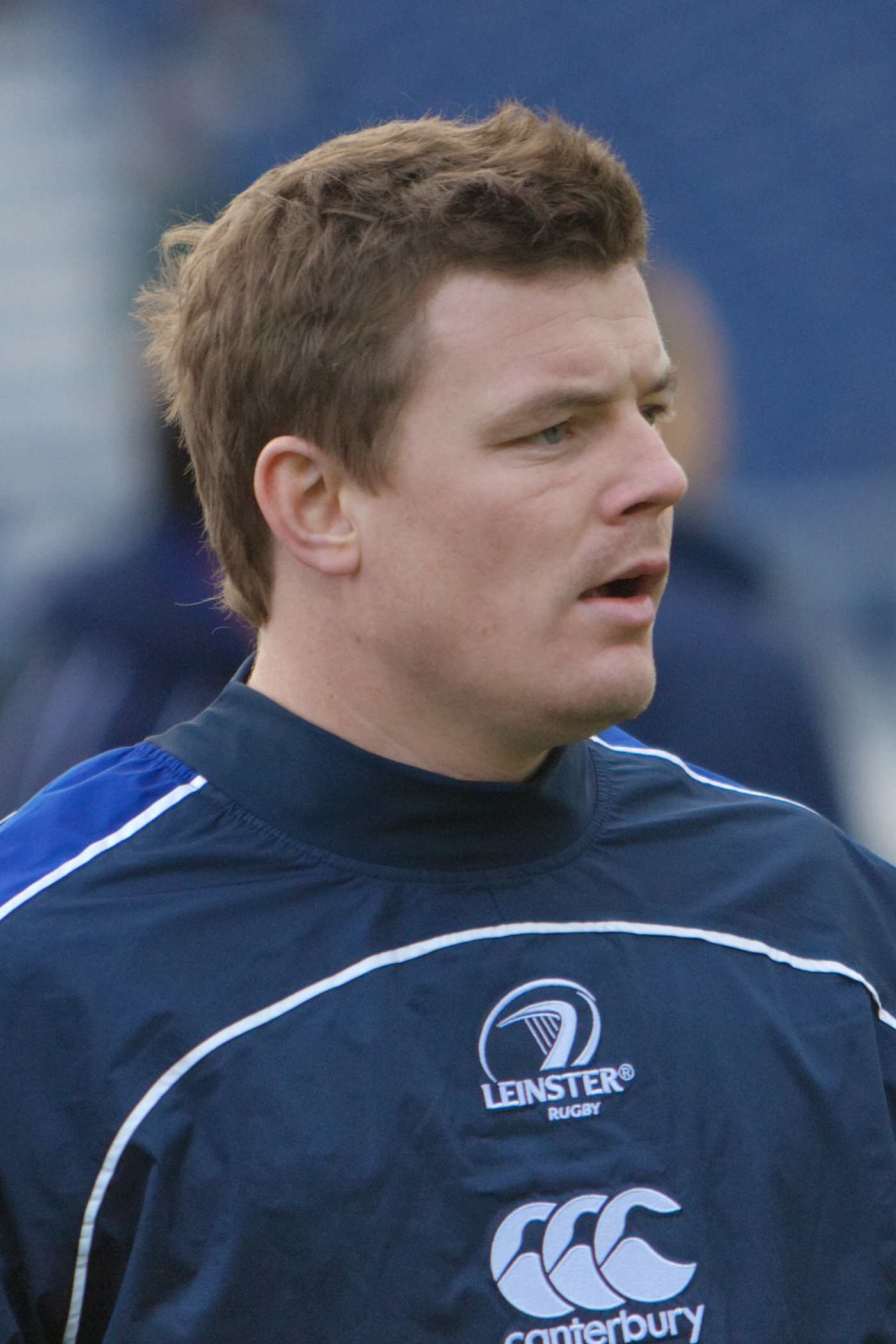
- O'Driscoll in 2007
- Born: Brian Gerard O'Driscoll; 21 January 1979 (age 47); Dublin, Ireland
- Spouse: Amy Huberman (m. 2010)
- Children: 3
- Relatives: Frank O'Driscoll (father); Barry O'Driscoll (cousin); John O'Driscoll (cousin)
- Height: 1.75 m (5 ft 9 in)
- Weight: 93 kg (14 st 9 lb; 205 lb)
- School: Blackrock College
- University: University College Dublin

Rugby union career
- Position: Outside centre
Senior career
| Years | Team | Apps | (Points) |
| 1998–2014 | University College Dublin | | |
Provincial / State sides
| Years | Team | Apps | (Points) |
| 1999–2014 | Leinster | 186 | (311) |
International career
| Years | Team | Apps | (Points) |
| 1996 | Ireland Schools | 3 | |
| 1998 | Ireland U-19s | 5 | |
| 1999 | Ireland U-21s | 4 | |
| 2002 | Ireland A | 1 | |
| 1999–2014 | Ireland | 133 | (245) |
| 2001–2013 | British & Irish Lions | 8 | (5) |

Brian Gerard O'Driscoll (born 21 January 1979) is an Irish former professional rugby union player. He played his entire career at outside centre for the Irish provincial team Leinster and for Ireland. He captained Ireland from 2003 until 2012, and captained the British & Irish Lions for their 2005 tour of New Zealand. He is widely regarded as one of the greatest rugby players of all time.

O'Driscoll is the sixth most-capped player in rugby union history, having played 141 test matches: 133 for Ireland (83 as captain), and 8 for the Lions. With 46 tries for Ireland and 1 try for the Lions in 2001, he is Ireland's highest-ever try scorer; additionally, he is the 10th-highest try scorer in international rugby union history and the highest-scoring centre of all time. He also holds the record for the most Six Nations tries with 26. O'Driscoll was chosen as Player of the Tournament in the 2006, 2007 and 2009 Six Nations Championships.

He was inducted into the World Rugby Hall of Fame on 17 November 2016 at the opening ceremony of its first location in Rugby, England. Since retirement, he has worked as a pundit and analyst for BT Sport and ITV Sport and ventured into business start-ups, including the Ultimate Rugby mobile app and Zipp, an Irish e-scooter business. O'Driscoll was involved in Irish Rugby's unsuccessful bid to host the 2023 World Cup.

== Early life ==
O'Driscoll was born and bred in Clontarf in the northside of Dublin to Frank and Geraldine O'Driscoll, both physicians. He had barely played rugby until he went to the rugby nursery Blackrock College, from the age of 12. O'Driscoll's family was steeped in rugby. His father, Frank, played two games for Ireland and a cousin of his father, Barry, won four caps. Another cousin of Frank's, Barry's brother John, represented Ireland 26 times and was a member of the Lions teams that toured South Africa in 1980 and New Zealand in 1983.

As a child, O'Driscoll played Gaelic football before switching to rugby. For his secondary education, he attended Blackrock College, where he played in the Leinster Senior Cup team in 1996 and 1997.

Although O'Driscoll started the first two rounds of the competition in 1996, he was subsequently dropped to the bench for the remainder of the competition, and was an unused replacement in the team's victorious final appearance. In 1997 they were beaten in the quarter-final by Clongowes. He was capped three times for Ireland Schools in 1996.

In 1998, O'Driscoll played for the Ireland U-19 side, which won the Under 19 Rugby World Championship.

After leaving school, he attended University College Dublin (UCD) on a scholarship and graduated with a Diploma in Sports Management in 1998.

While at UCD, he first made the under-20 side, before being promoted to the top team near the end of his first year. O'Driscoll made his Ireland under-21 debut in February 1999, and eventually gained four caps.

In 2009, he received the UCD Foundation Day Medal for his sporting achievements.

== Leinster ==
O'Driscoll made his debut for Leinster in 1999, and under head coach Matt Williams and backs coach Alan Gaffney he became an explosive force in the Leinster backline, forming a highly effective centre partnership with Shane Horgan. In 2001, Leinster won the inaugural Celtic League beating Munster in Lansdowne Road. In 2003, Leinster were heavy favourites for that year's Heineken Cup but were beaten by Perpignan in the semi-finals.

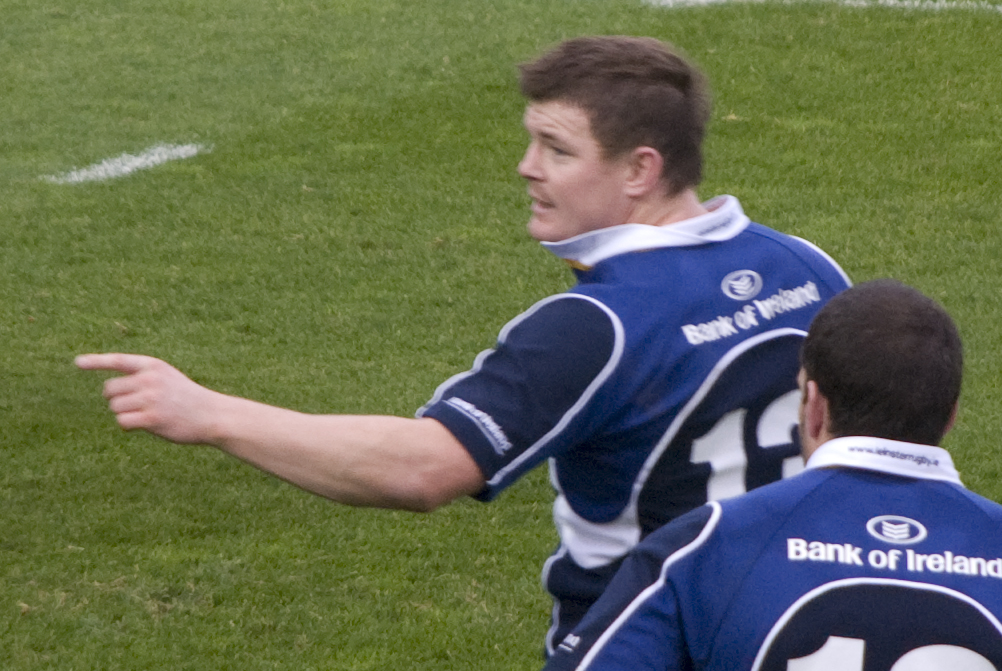
O'Driscoll on 10 November 2007. Leinster Rugby v Leicester Tigers in Heineken Cup

Leinster appointed Michael Cheika in the summer of 2005 and despite rumours of O'Driscoll moving to France, O'Driscoll agreed to another year in Ireland. That year, O'Driscoll returning from a shoulder injury suffered on the Lions tour, would assume the captaincy for the season. Under backs coach David Knox and the movement of Argentine international Felipe Contepomi to fly half, the Leinster backline became one of the most potent in Europe.

O'Driscoll excelled in wins over Bath Rugby and Toulouse away from home. These victories would set up a Heineken Cup semi-final in Lansdowne Road against Munster, but defeat against the eventual champions Munster would deny O'Driscoll and his team a final berth. Leinster were also denied a Magners League title, with David Humphreys of Ulster slotting an injury-time drop goal to give victory to Ulster in their final game of the season.

In 2007, Wasps beat Leinster in the quarter-finals of the Heineken Cup. In 2008, Leinster lost in the group stages. In 2007, Leinster reached the final hurdle of the Magners league only to be denied by the Ospreys and Cardiff. In 2008, Leinster won that title ahead of Munster, marking O'Driscoll's second honour with the province, his first and only as captain.

The 2008–09 season marked a shift in focus for O'Driscoll. While retaining the Irish captaincy under new coach Declan Kidney, he handed the honour of Leinster captain to Leo Cullen. O'Driscoll scored two tries in the defeat of English champions London Wasps, however, this victory was followed by away defeats for Leinster to both London Wasps and Castres. Leinster advanced to the quarter-finals to face Harlequins at the Twickenham Stoop. When O'Driscoll was absent through injury in April 2009, Leinster relinquished their Magners League crown to Munster at Thomond Park. Against Harlequins, Leinster scored a 6–5 victory, the game infamous for the Bloodgate incident.

In the semi-final against rivals Munster in Croke Park, an 82,206 sell-out, O'Driscoll was awarded the man of the match award (which he later dedicated to the entire team) after an intercept try completed a convincing win for Leinster and sent O'Driscoll to his first Heineken Cup final. Leinster captured the Heineken Cup against Leicester Tigers on 23 May 2009. The 19–16 Heineken Cup victory included a drop goal from O'Driscoll who was suffering from a shoulder injury.

In the 2010–11 season, O'Driscoll won his second Heineken Cup with Leinster. Having suffered a knee injury in a Magners League game one week before the final, O'Driscoll was a major doubt, but he recovered sufficiently and was named in the starting XV. In the final held at the Millennium Stadium, Cardiff on 21 May 2011, Leinster came from behind to defeat Northampton 33–22.

In the 2012 Heineken Cup Final O'Driscoll won his third Heineken Cup with Leinster. They beat Ulster 42–14 in an entertaining battle. Seán O'Brien opened the scoring for Leinster to put them ahead 7–3. At halftime, the score was 14–6, with Cian Healy scoring the second try for Leinster but there was still a lot to play for. A penalty try was then awarded for Leinster but Ulster pulled a try back from second-row Dan Tuohy. Heinke van der Merwe then settled the game with a try for Leinster and Seán Cronin made sure of Leinster's success.

O'Driscoll said in September 2013, that the 2013–14 season would be his last before retiring.

His final appearance for Leinster, and for any team, was in the 2014 Pro12 Grand Final on 31 May in Leinster's home ground, the RDS in Dublin, in which Leinster defeated the Glasgow Warriors 34–12. He left the field injured early in the first half to be replaced by Ian Madigan. His final act as a rugby player was assisting club captain Leo Cullen – who also finished his career on this day – in lifting the Pro12 trophy

== International career ==
=== Ireland ===
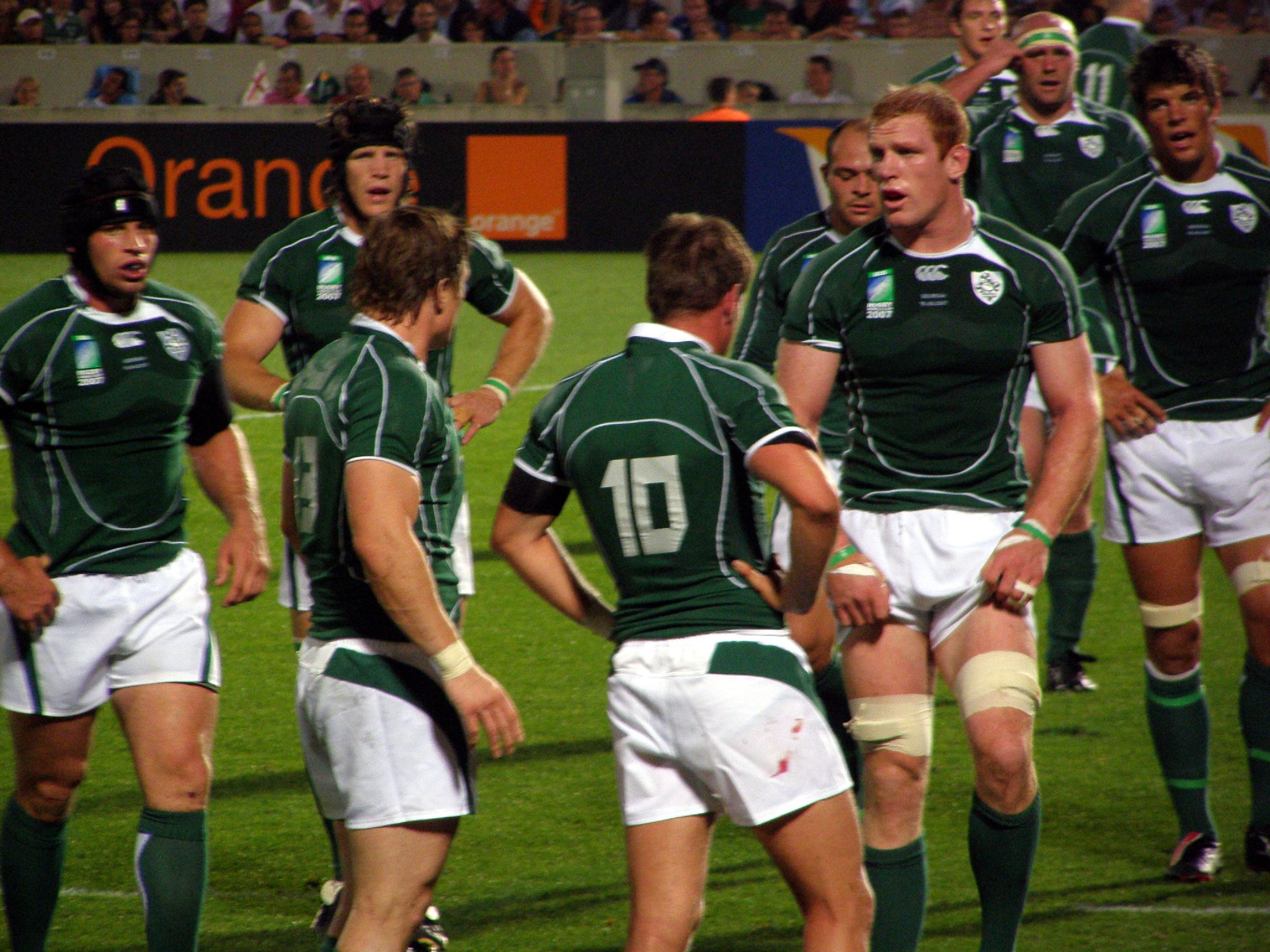
B.O'D. captaining Ireland vs Georgia during the 2007 Rugby World Cup

In 1999, O'Driscoll was selected for the senior squad and was on the bench for a match against Italy, although he did not play. He won his first Test cap at age 20 on 12 June 1999 in a 46–10 loss to Australia in Brisbane as part of the tour of Australia. O'Driscoll played for Ireland before he played for the senior Leinster team.

In 2000, O'Driscoll scored a Hat-trick of tries in a Six Nations Championship victory against France in Paris, propelling Ireland to their first win in Paris since 1972.

O'Driscoll's popularity in Ireland was expressed by supporters wearing T-shirts bearing the motto "In BOD We Trust". In 2002, O'Driscoll was handed the captaincy for the first time in Ireland's 18–9 win over Australia, the first Irish victory over the Wallabies since 1979. In 2003, following the international retirement of long-time Ireland captain Keith Wood, O'Driscoll was awarded the captaincy on a permanent basis. In that year, O'Driscoll led Ireland to second place in the Six Nations Championship. This was followed by Triple Crowns in 2004 (Ireland's first crown since 1985), 2006 and 2007. In 2004, O'Driscoll captained Ireland to a 17–12 victory over South Africa, the first Irish win over the Springboks since 1965.

In 2009, O'Driscoll was again selected as captain, leading Ireland to win the Triple Crown, Six Nations Championship and their first Grand Slam in 61 years. He scored a try in every match except one, culminating in a 17–15 victory in Cardiff in which O'Driscoll again scored a try and was the RBS man of the match. On 27 March 2009, he was named as player of the 2009 Six Nations Championship, winning the fans' online poll. In May 2009, he was named the Bord Gáis Energy IRUPA Players' Player of the Year for the past season.

On 15 November 2009, in a 20–20 draw against Australia at Croke Park, O'Driscoll scored a last minute try. The next day, he was named as one of the seven nominations for the 2009 International Rugby Board player of the year, but controversially missed out to Richie McCaw for this title by a solitary point.

O'Driscoll started for and captained Ireland for every match during the 2010 Six Nations Championship. He picked up his 100th test cap for Ireland against Wales. He scored his 40th test try against New Zealand on 12 June 2010. He started every match for Ireland in the 2010 Autumn Tests. He played for Ireland in the last four World Cups (17 caps, 7 tries). He became Ireland's most capped player on 26 June 2010 against Australia, winning his 103rd cap.

In the 2011 Six Nations Championship, O'Driscoll's 47th-minute try against England, took him past Ian Smith's 78-year-old record of 24 tries to become the leading Championship try scorer of all time with 25 Tries. The same day, O'Driscoll tied John Smit's International Captaincy caps record of 75.

O'Driscoll was ruled out of the entire 2012 Six Nations after undergoing shoulder surgery. In his absence, Keith Earls was chosen to partner inside centre Gordon D'Arcy, starting four of the five championship games in the position usually occupied by O'Driscoll.

He returned as captain for the tour of New Zealand in 2012 and he also equalled John Smit's record as captaining an international side (83 times) but All Black Captain Richie McCaw tied the O'Driscoll/Smit record during the 2013 Rugby Championship against South Africa and McCaw overtook the record when playing in Japan on 2 November 2013. O'Driscoll was fit to play in the 2013 tournament, but before the tournament, it was announced that O'Driscoll, who had missed the Autumn internationals earlier that season through injury, would not be reinstated as captain. Declan Kidney named O'Driscoll's Leinster teammate Jamie Heaslip as captain, in his place. O'Driscoll still started each game of the 2013 Championship for Ireland.

On 8 March 2014, in his last home international for Ireland, O'Driscoll led the team out against Italy in the 2014 Six Nations Championship and contributed to three tries in the game as Ireland won 46–7, for which he was awarded Man of the Match. At this point O'Driscoll achieved a world record for the highest number of international caps, with 140, overtaking George Gregan's record with Australia.

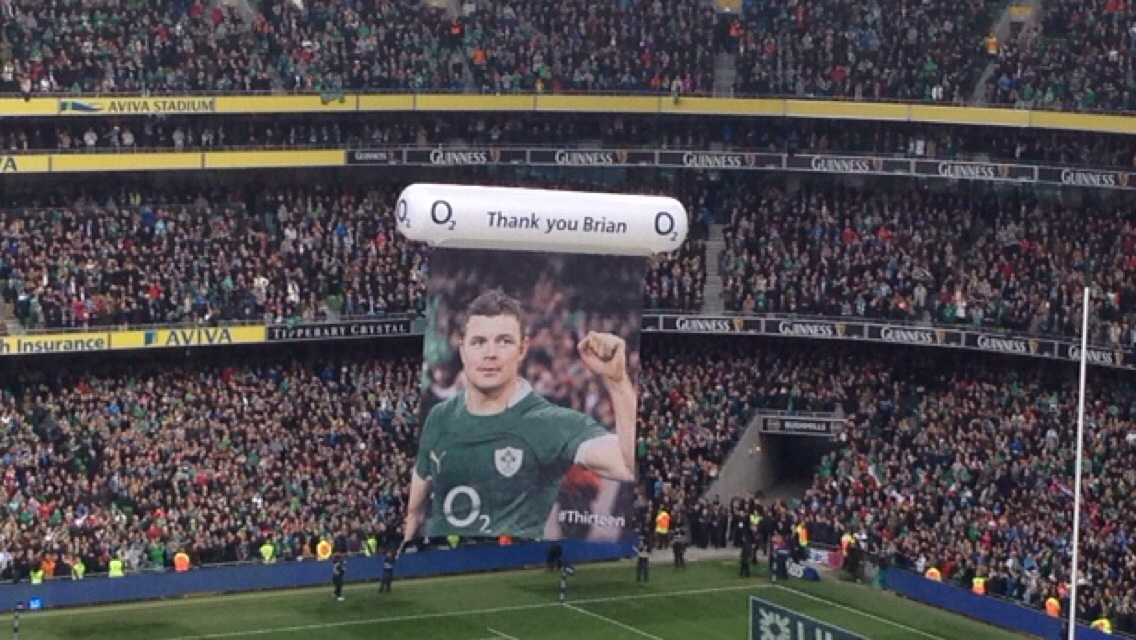
Brian O'Driscoll's Final Home Test match

In his last international match, the finale of the 2014 Six Nations Championship on 15 March 2014, O'Driscoll and the Irish team beat France in Paris for only the second time in 42 years, crowning Ireland the 2014 Six Nations Championship champions. In the post-match interview, an emotional O'Driscoll remarked he could not have wished to finish his career in a better way.

=== British & Irish Lions ===
O'Driscoll appeared in all three British & Irish Lions Tests on the team's 2001 tour of Australia where he announced himself as a world star with an outstanding individual try in the 1st Test victory at the Gabba in Brisbane.

O'Driscoll was named captain of the team for their 2005 tour of New Zealand. Prior to that tour, he had been named captain of the Northern Hemisphere side for the IRB Rugby Aid Match (a 2004 Indian Ocean tsunami fundraiser) held at Twickenham in March 2005, but was forced to withdraw due to a shoulder injury, but appeared pitch-side for the match. O'Driscoll's playing contribution to the 2005 Lions ended in the opening minutes of the first Test against the All Blacks in Christchurch on 25 June 2005, when he was carried off the field on a stretcher with a dislocated shoulder just after being tackled by All Blacks skipper Tana Umaga and Keven Mealamu at a ruck. The independent citing commissioner found that the New Zealand players had no case to answer, and the Lions management were criticised by New Zealanders for attempting to divert attention from the team's poor performance. However, four months later, The International Rugby Board's communications manager Greg Thomas stated "that dangerous tackles like this have no part in the game". Rules were changed to outlaw spear tackles after the 2007 World Cup. Although unable to play, O'Driscoll remained as non-playing captain on a losing tour and only underwent surgery on his return. He then released a DVD entitled Brian O'Driscoll's Lions Diary in which he described his tour experience and his opinion of the events that transpired.

On 21 April 2009, O'Driscoll was selected as part of the 2009 British & Irish Lions tour to South Africa. On 1 June 2009, he was named as captain of the Lions for the game against the Golden Lions taking place on 3 June, in place of the rested Paul O'Connell. He was also named in the outside centre position for the Lions in their first test of the 2009 tour against South Africa, in which he made two assists as the Lions lost 26 – 21. He was forced to withdraw from the tour on 30 June before the third and final test due to a head injury and subsequent concussion he suffered in the second test.

On 30 April 2013, O'Driscoll was named in the squad for his fourth British & Irish Lions tour. O'Driscoll is only the third player in 125 years of the tournament to achieve this. The tour commenced on Saturday 1 June 2013 when the Lions beat the Barbarians at the Hong Kong Stadium. He was selected at outside centre for the first two tests of the tour. He was controversially dropped from the squad for the final test, which the Lions won by 41 points to 16.

=== Barbarians ===
O'Driscoll has appeared three times for the invitational Barbarians rugby team: against South Africa on 10 December 2000, against Scotland on 22 May 2004, and against England on 30 May 2004. Against South Africa, O'Driscoll scored his only try as a part of the Barbarians team.

== Tributes and awards ==
In 2001, 2002 and 2009, O'Driscoll was nominated for the IRB World Player of the Year. In 2001, he lost out to his Irish teammate Keith Wood; in 2002, to Fabien Galthié; and, in 2009, when widely regarded as the favourite for the award, to Richie McCaw by a solitary point, with one judge, who would otherwise have given O'Driscoll the award, citing a flawed voting system.

O'Driscoll was chosen as Player of the Tournament in the 2006, 2007 and 2009 RBS Six Nations Championships.

In 2007, former England centre and captain Will Carling published his list of the '50 Greatest Rugby players' in The Daily Telegraph, and ranked O'Driscoll the tenth greatest player of all time. In summer 2008, he received the Dubliner of the Year Award from The Dubliner magazine. In January 2010, he was voted World Rugby Player of the Decade (2000–09) by the magazine Rugby World.

O'Driscoll has received Honorary Doctorates from Dublin City University in 2013, Queen's University Belfast in 2014, and Trinity College Dublin in 2017.

== Personal life ==
O'Driscoll was in a long-term relationship with model and Xpose presenter Glenda Gilson for a number of years until they split up in 2005. In his autobiography he reveals that he received some playful teasing over the relationship from his teammates.

O'Driscoll married actress Amy Huberman in July 2010 in Lough Rynn Castle. Their first child, a daughter named Sadie, was born just hours before a Six Nations clash with England on 10 February 2013. Their second child, a son named Billy, was born on 20 November 2014. Their third child Ted was born on 28 December 2020.

He has published one book, A Year in the Centre (2005), a memoir of a year as a professional rugby player. A biography called In BOD We Trust, by Marcus Stead was published in March 2008. A revised and extended version of Stead's book was published in August 2011, Brian O'Driscoll: The Biography. In February 2011, O'Driscoll and his wife were invited to the wedding of Prince William, Duke of Cambridge, and Catherine Middleton, but only Huberman attended, because of his club team's (Leinster) preparation for their Heineken Cup semi-final against Toulouse the day after the wedding.

In 2009, O'Driscoll stated in a post-game interview after the Six Nations Championship match against England, "Knowledge is knowing that a tomato is a fruit. Wisdom is knowing not to put it in a fruit salad." Later he admitted incorporating this quote into an interview was part of a bet with Gordon D'Arcy, and not some impromptu repartee.

On 18 May 2011, O'Driscoll attended a state dinner hosted by President Mary McAleese to mark Queen Elizabeth II's visit to the Republic of Ireland.

In June 2014, it was announced that he would be joining Newstalk as a rugby pundit and co-presenter on Off The Ball. He also works for BT Sport as an analyst. O'Driscoll was part of ITV Sport's team of studio pundits for the 2015 Rugby World Cup in England, and has continued to work for ITV during their coverage of the Six Nations Championship from 2016 onwards.

In October 2014, O'Driscoll's new book The Test: My Autobiography was published. It was originally to be written by award-winning sports journalist and ghostwriter Paul Kimmage, but the relationship between O'Driscoll and Kimmage broke down after three years of work together. The book won Sports Book of the Year at the 2014 Irish Book Awards. O'Driscoll is a supporter of English football club Manchester United F.C.

In 2018, O'Driscoll presented a one-off television documentary, Shoulder to Shoulder, for BT Sport on the all-Ireland nature of the IRFU, and the use of Ireland's Call as the IRFU's anthem.

In April 2024, O'Driscoll was fined by the Competition and Consumer Protection Commission for not disclosing that his Instagram posts were commercial in nature.

== Statistics ==
=== International analysis by opposition ===
133 caps for Ireland

| Against | Played | Won | Lost | Drawn | Tries | Points | % Won |
|---|---|---|---|---|---|---|---|
| Argentina | 8 | 6 | 2 | 0 | 1 | 5 | 75 |
| Australia | 12 | 3 | 8 | 1 | 3 | 18 | 25 |
| Canada | 1 | 1 | 0 | 0 | 0 | 0 | 100 |
| England | 13 | 8 | 5 | 0 | 3 | 18 | 61.54 |
| Fiji | 2 | 2 | 0 | 0 | 2 | 10 | 100 |
| France | 15 | 5 | 9 | 1 | 8 | 40 | 33.33 |
| Georgia | 2 | 2 | 0 | 0 | 2 | 10 | 100 |
| Italy | 15 | 14 | 1 | 0 | 6 | 30 | 93.33 |
| Japan | 1 | 1 | 0 | 0 | 2 | 10 | 100 |
| Namibia | 2 | 2 | 0 | 0 | 1 | 5 | 100 |
| New Zealand | 13 | 0 | 13 | 0 | 3 | 21 | 0 |
| Pacific Islanders | 1 | 1 | 0 | 0 | 0 | 0 | 100 |
| Romania | 3 | 3 | 0 | 0 | 1 | 8 | 100 |
| Russia | 1 | 1 | 0 | 0 | 0 | 0 | 100 |
| Samoa | 3 | 3 | 0 | 0 | 0 | 0 | 100 |
| Scotland | 15 | 11 | 4 | 0 | 5 | 25 | 73.33 |
| South Africa | 7 | 3 | 4 | 0 | 1 | 5 | 42.86 |
| United States | 3 | 3 | 0 | 0 | 1 | 5 | 100 |
| Wales | 16 | 11 | 5 | 0 | 7 | 35 | 68.75 |
| Total | 133 | 80 | 51 | 2 | 46 | 245 | 60.15 |

8 caps for British & Irish Lions.

| Against | Played | Won | Lost | Drawn | Tries | Points | % Won |
|---|---|---|---|---|---|---|---|
| Australia | 5 | 2 | 3 | 0 | 1 | 5 | 40 |
| New Zealand | 1 | 0 | 1 | 0 | 0 | 0 | 0 |
| South Africa | 2 | 0 | 2 | 0 | 0 | 0 | 0 |
| Total | 8 | 2 | 6 | 0 | 1 | 5 | 25 |

Correct as of 17 March 2014

== Honours ==
=== Leinster ===
- Celtic League - 4: 2001–2002, 2007–2008, 2012–2013, 2013–2014
- Heineken European Cup - 3: 2008–2009, 2010–2011, 2011–2012
- Amlin European Challenge Cup - 1: 2012–2013

=== Ireland ===
- IRB Under-19 World Championship: 1998
- Six Nations Championship - 2: 2009, 2014
- Grand Slam - 1: 2009
- Triple Crown - 4: 2004, 2006, 2007, 2009

=== British & Irish Lions ===
- British & Irish Lions series: 2013

=== Individual ===
- World Rugby Men's 15s Team of the Decade: 2010–2019
- 6 Nations All-time Top try scorer: (26 tournament tries)
- 6 Nations Player of the Year: 2006, 2007, 2009
- 6 Nations Top try scorer: 2009 (Tied with Riki Flutey)
- British & Irish Lions captain: 2005
- British & Irish Lions tourist: 2001, 2005, 2009, 2013
- Heineken Cup Top try scorer: 2008–2009
- IRB International Player of the Year Shortlist: 2001, 2002, 2009
- ERC European Dream Team: 2010
- IRB International Try of the Year: 2008 (Australia v Ireland)
- IRUPA Players' Player of the Year: 2008–09
- Rugby World Magazine Player of the Decade: 2010
- Rugby World Magazine Team of the Decade: 2010
- RTÉ Sports Hall of Fame Award: 2014
- Dubliner of the Year Award: 2008
- RUWC Pat Marshall Memorial Award: 2009
- Texaco Sportstars Rugby Award: 2000, 2002, 2007 and 2009
- IRPA Special Merit Award: 2015
- VISA RWC Fan-tastic XV: 2003

== Biography ==
A Year in the Centre, 2005, Dublin, Penguin Books, Ltd ISBN 1-84488-078-8

The Test: My Autobiography, 2015, Dublin, Penguin Books, Ltd ISBN 9780241962688

== See also ==
- List of leading rugby union test try scorers
- List of international rugby union caps for Brian O'Driscoll

Sporting positions
| Preceded by Anthony Foley; David Humphreys; David Humphreys; Simon Best | Ireland Rugby Union Captain; Nov 2002 – Jun 2005; Jun 2005 – Nov 2005; 2006 – May 2007; 2008–2012 | Succeeded by David Humphreys; Simon Easterby; Simon Best; Rory Best |
| Preceded by Martin Johnson | British & Irish Lions captain 2005 (Tour); May–Jun 2005 (active) | Succeeded by Tour – Paul O'Connell active: Martin Corry |
