= Frank O'Driscoll =

Irish doctor and rugby union player

Frank O'Driscoll is an Irish doctor and former rugby union international, belatedly receiving his cap on 19 August 2023. He came from a rugby family - his son Brian and cousins Barry and John also all played rugby union for Ireland.
