= Bernard Duprat =

France international rugby union player & coach

Bernard Duprat (born Bayonne, 17 July 1943) is a former French rugby union player. He played as a wing.

Duprat played for Aviron Bayonnais, from 1964/65 to 1977/78. He also played for Anglet Olympique and US Mouguerre.

He had 15 caps for France, from 1965 to 1972, scoring 9 tries, 31 points on aggregate. He played at the Five Nations Championship in 1966, 1967, 1968 and 1972, being a member of the winning side at the 1968 Five Nations Championship, with a Grand Slam. He was the top try scorer at the 1972 Five Nations Championship, with 4 tries.

After finishing his playing career, he became a coach.
