= Barry O'Driscoll =

Irish rugby union player and doctor

Barry Joseph O'Driscoll (born 18 September 1943) is an Irish doctor and former rugby union international. He came from a rugby family - his brother John, cousin Frank and Frank's son Brian also all played rugby union for Ireland.
