= Luis Gradín =

Luis Lucho Mariano Gradín is a former Argentine rugby union player and coach, and a current sports executive. He played as a scrum-half.

Gradín is one of the most mythical names of Argentine rugby history. He first played for San Isidro Club, before joining Belgrano Athletic, one of the four founding teams of the UAR. He had 14 caps for Argentina, from 1965 to 1973, scoring 5 tries, 1 conversion and 4 penalties, 32 points on aggregate.

He was the head coach of Argentina for three times, from 1979 to 1980, with Aitor Otaño, from 1990 to 1991, with Guillermo Lamarca, and in 1992, with José Luis Imhoff. He and Lamarca were head coaches at the 1991 Rugby World Cup, where the "Pumas" were eliminated in the 1st round, after losing all the three games.

He was the President of the UAR from 1985 to 2000, and during his tenure it was accepted for the first time that professional players could represent the "Pumas" and he allowed that the shirts of the National Team had publicity. He was twice President of the URBA, being elected for the second time in 2012.
