= Jean-François Phliponeau =

France international rugby union player

- Born: 23 November 1950 Fort-de-l'Eau, Algiers, French Algeria
- Died: 9 May 1976 (aged 25) Clermont-Ferrand, France
- Height: 5 ft 7 in (170 cm)
- Weight: 153 lb (69 kg)

Rugby union career
- Position: Wing
International career
Years	Team	Apps	(Points)
1973	France	2	(4)

Jean-François Phliponeau (23 November 1950 — 9 May 1976) was a French rugby union international.

== Biography ==
Phliponeau was born in Algiers, French Algeria, but grew up in mainland France. His hometown club was RC Rouen, which he left in 1971 to join AS Montferrand, from where he gained selection for France as a winger in the 1973 Five Nations Championship. Capped twice during the tournament, Phliponeau debuted in France's win over Wales at the Parc des Princes and also played against Ireland at Lansdowne Road, scoring a try in a French loss.

=== Death ===
In 1976, Phliponeau was killed by a lightning strike on the Stade Marcel-Michelin pitch, while playing a practice match with AS Montferrand teammates ahead of their appearance in the Challenge Yves du Manoir final. He was 25 years of age.

== See also ==
- List of France national rugby union players
