= Phil O'Callaghan =

Irish rugby international player (1946–2026)

- Full name: Philip O'Callaghan
- Born: 25 March 1946 Cork, Ireland
- Died: 25 October 2026 (aged 80)

Rugby union career
- Position: Prop
International career
Years	Team	Apps	(Points)
1967–76	Ireland	21	(0)

Philip O'Callaghan (25 March 1946 – 25 October 2026) was an Irish rugby union international prop.

== Biography ==
O'Callaghan, born and raised in Cork, started out as a soccer player before taking up rugby union in his teenage years. He began his senior rugby career with Ballyphehane club Dolphin RFC.

He gained 21 caps for Ireland on both sides of the scrum, debuting against Australia at Lansdowne Road in 1967. He took part in Ireland's tour of Australia later that year and was in the team that defeated the home side in Sydney. His final Test was against the All Blacks in Wellington on Ireland's 1976 tour.

O'Callaghan was a 2016 inductee into the Munster Rugby Hall of Fame. He died on 25 October 2026, at the age of 80.

== See also ==
- List of Ireland national rugby union players
