= Mick Molloy (rugby union) =

Irish rugby union footballer

Michael Gabriel Molloy (born 27 September 1944) is an Irish former rugby union player. Molloy played lock for the Ireland national rugby union team, earning 27 caps from 1966 to 1973. Molloy debuted for Ireland on 29 January 1966 against France. Molloy played on Ireland's 1967 tour of Australia and Ireland's 1970 tour of Argentina. Molloy considers his career highlight to be Ireland's 15–8 win against Australia before a crowd of 54,000 at Lansdowne Road in Dublin, Ireland in 1967. Molloy played most of his international matches between 1967 and 1971, with Molloy falling out of favor with team selectors, and only playing two international matches after that.

Molloy is originally from Cornamona, Galway. Molloy played his club rugby for University College Galway RFC while he was a medical student there. Molloy moved to England to further his medical career, where he played his club rugby with the London Irish.

== IRB Medical Officer ==
Molloy returned to live and work in Ireland. He served as the Ireland team doctor and as the medical advisor to the Irish Rugby Union.

Molloy served as a member of the IRB Medical Advisory Committee. Molloy was then appointed by the International Rugby Board in 2005 as the IRB's first ever medical officer. In that role, Molloy sought to "help ensure the highest standard of care for all players," and sought to apply best practice medicine to advance the well-being of rugby players. Molloy continued in that role until the end of 2010. Molloy's important contribution was publicly acknowledged by IRB Chairman Bernard Lapasset, who recognized that Molloy's "achievements, particularly in the key areas of global injury surveillance and the development of cross-sport concussion guidelines, have significantly benefited rugby and the wider sporting family."

== See also ==
- List of Ireland national rugby union players
- List of NUI Galway people
