= Sandy Sanders =

England international rugby union player & administrator

- Full name: Donald Louis G. Sanders
- Born: 6 September 1924 Fulham, England
- Died: 25 October 2011 (aged 87) Ipswich, England

Rugby union career
- Position: Prop
International career
Years	Team	Apps	(Points)
1954–56	England	9	(0)

Donald Louis G. Sanders (6 September 1924 – 25 October 2011), known as Sandy Sanders, was an English rugby union administrator and international player.

Born in Fulham, Sanders was a junior product of Ipswich YMCA (now Ipswich YM RUFC). He played his senior rugby with Harlequins and was capped nine times as a prop by England, debuting against Wales at Twickenham in the 1954 Five Nations. He captained the Eastern Counties side that played against the 1954 touring All Blacks.

Sanders received career-ending injuries in a motorcycle accident while holidays in Yugoslavia in 1956. The accident claimed the life of his friend, with whom he was riding pillion on the motorcycle. Scotland international Micky Grant was also on the trip and is credited for saving the life of Sanders by transporting him to a Rijeka hospital. He lost eight pints of blood in the accident and had his leg fractured in three places.

Sanders served as England chairman of selectors in the 1970s and was later president of the Rugby Football Union.

== See also ==
- List of England national rugby union players
