= Michel Taffary =

French rugby union player (born 1950)

- Born: 25 May 1950 (age 76) Peyrehorade, France
- Height: 5 ft 7 in (170 cm)
- Weight: 153 lb (69 kg)

Rugby union career
- Position: Fullback
International career
Years	Team	Apps	(Points)
1975	France	4	(6)

Michel Taffary (born 25 May 1950) is a French former rugby union international.

Born in Peyrehorade, Taffary was a fullback who plied his trade with Paris club Racing club de France.

Taffary, following a starring performance for France "B" against Wales, was called up to the national team to compete in the 1975 Five Nations, replacing an injured Michel Droitecourt. He was France's fullback in all four Five Nations matches.

== See also ==
- List of France national rugby union players
