= Mike Beese =

England international rugby union player (born 1948)

- Full name: Michael Christopher Beese
- Born: 8 October 1948 (age 78) Bristol, England
- Height: 6 ft 2 in (188 cm)

Rugby union career
- Position: Centre
International career
Years	Team	Apps	(Points)
1972	England	3	(4)

Michael Christopher Beese is an English former rugby union international.

Beese was born in Bristol and attended Keynsham Grammar School.

A centre, Beese was a Somerset captain and spent much of his career with Bath, scoring 95 tries in 317 appearances for the club. He also played for Liverpool while studying at Liverpool Polytechnic, from where he was picked to play for England in the 1972 Five Nations Championship, gaining three caps.

Beese was a town planner by profession.

== See also ==
- List of England national rugby union players
