= John O'Driscoll (rugby union) =

Irish rugby union player

John O'Driscoll (born 26 November 1952) is an Irish former rugby union player. He was educated at Stonyhurst College and is a former Ireland international rugby union player, winning 26 caps at flanker. He toured South Africa in 1980 and New Zealand in 1983 with the British Lions, earning six Test caps. At the time he played club rugby for London Irish and captained the Exiles team that reached the final of the 1980 John Player Cup.

He played for Connacht at interprovincial level. His older brother Barry O'Driscoll was also capped for Ireland. Former Lions captain Brian O'Driscoll is related to the brothers.

In 2025 he was elected the 136th president of the Irish Rugby Football Union.
