= Kevin Flynn (rugby union) =

Irish rugby union player (1939–2022)

- Born: Michael Kevin Flynn; 20 March 1939 Dublin, County Dublin, Leinster, Ireland
- Died: 16 January 2022 (aged 82) Dublin, County Dublin, Leinster, Ireland

Rugby union career
Amateur team(s)
Years	Team	Apps	(Points)
- Wanderers
Provincial / State sides
Years	Team	Apps	(Points)
- Leinster
International career
Years	Team	Apps	(Points)
1959–1973	Ireland	22	

Michael Kevin Flynn (20 March 1939 – 16 January 2022) was an Irish rugby union player who represented the national team, earning 22 caps, and played at club level for Wanderers and Leinster. Flynn died in Dublin on 16 January 2022, at the age of 82.
