= Lucien Pariès =

France international rugby union player

- Born: 4 August 1947 Anglet, France
- Died: 29 January 1998 (aged 50) Aix-les-Bains, France
- Height: 5 ft 8 in (173 cm)
- Weight: 194 lb (88 kg)

Rugby union career
- Position: Fly-half
International career
Years	Team	Apps	(Points)
1968–75	France	8	(46)

Lucien Pariès (4 August 1947 — 29 January 1998) was a French rugby union international.

Born in Anglet in southwestern France, Pariès was a fly-half and skilled goal-kicker, who got his start in senior rugby at Biarritz Olympique. He gained eight France caps during his career, debuting against the visiting Springboks in 1968 at the Stade Yves-du-Manoir. His only French Championship was won with RC Narbonne in the 1978–79 season.

Pariès died in 1998 of a long illness, aged 50.

== See also ==
- List of France national rugby union players
