= Arthur Brown (rugby union) =

Scotland international rugby union player

- Born: Arthur Robert Brown; 10 December 1949 (age 76) Galashiels, Scotland

Rugby union career
- Position: Full Back
Amateur team(s)
Years	Team	Apps	(Points)
- Gala
Provincial / State sides
Years	Team	Apps	(Points)
- South of Scotland
International career
Years	Team	Apps	(Points)
1971-72	Scotland	5	(13)

Arthur Brown (born 10 December 1949) is a former Scotland international rugby union player.

== Rugby Union career ==
=== Amateur career ===
He played for Gala.

He was part of the Gala 7s side that won the Gala Sevens in 1969 beating Loughborough Colleges in the final; and in 1970, beating Llanelli in the final.

The Gala 7s side of Ken Oliver, Peter Brown, Johnny Brown, Dunc Paterson, Arthur Brown, John Frame and Drew Gill were a notable side. Nicknamed the magnificent seven the Gala 7s won 16 Sevens tournaments between 1970 and 1972.

=== Provincial career ===
He played for South of Scotland District.

=== International career ===
He was capped 5 times for Scotland.

His first two matches for Scotland were against England, in successive weeks. Scotland beat England twice over those 2 weeks; and it remains the only time that this has happened.
