= Alain Guilbert =

France international rugby union player

- Born: 28 September 1950 (age 76) Saint-Maur-des-Fossés, France
- Height: 6 ft 5 in (196 cm)
- Weight: 224 lb (102 kg)

Rugby union career
- Position: Lock / No. 8
International career
Years	Team	Apps	(Points)
1975–79	France	14	(4)

Alain Guilbert (born 28 September 1950) is a French former international rugby union player.

Born in Saint-Maur-des-Fossés, Guilbert is the son of Racing CF rugby player and Olympic rower Christian Guilbert.

Guilbert, a 6 ft 5 in forward, was capped 14 times for France from 1975 to 1979, utilised initially as a lock, then making his later appearances at number eight. His only career try came on debut, to help defeat England at Twickenham. He participated in tours of South Africa and Argentina. At the time of his international career, Guilbert played his rugby for RC Toulon, but also had stints with Racing CF, FC Grenoble and RC Hyères.

== See also ==
- List of France national rugby union players
