= Nigel Horton =

British Lions & England international rugby union player

- Born: Nigel Edgar Horton; 13 April 1948 (age 78) Birmingham, England

Rugby union career
- Position: Lock
Amateur team(s)
Years	Team	Apps	(Points)
1969–1980	Moseley		
1977-1979	Toulouse		
1980–1985	Saint-Claude		
International career
Years	Team	Apps	(Points)
1969–1980	England	20	(4)
1977	British Lions	0	(0)

Nigel Edgar Horton (born 13 April 1948) is a former England international rugby union player. He toured New Zealand in 1977 with the British and Irish Lions and at the time played club rugby for Moseley Rugby Football Club and St Claude rugby club in France
