= Roger Clegg (rugby union) =

Irish international rugby union player (born 1948)

- Full name: Roger James Clegg
- Born: 4 December 1948 (age 77) Bangor, Northern Ireland

Rugby union career
- Position: Prop
International career
Years	Team	Apps	(Points)
1973–75	Ireland	5	(0)

Roger James Clegg (born 4 December 1948) is a former Ireland rugby union international from Northern Ireland.

Clegg was a tighthead prop from Bangor, County Down. He attended Bangor Grammar School and played his rugby for Bangor RFC. Between 1973 and 1975, Clegg gained five international caps for Ireland, all in the Five Nations Championship. He was on the 1976 Ireland tour of Oceania and later served as captain of Ulster.

== See also ==
- List of Ireland national rugby union players
