= Billy McCombe =

Rugby union player from Northern Ireland

- Full name: William McMachan McCombe
- Born: 6 February 1949
- Died: 12 March 2025 (aged 76)
- University: Trinity College Dublin

Rugby union career
- Position: Fly-half
International career
Years	Team	Apps	(Points)
1968–75	Ireland	5	(32)

William McMachan McCombe (6 February 1949 – 12 March 2025) was an Irish international rugby union player.

== Biography ==
McCombe played his club rugby for Bangor and Dublin University.

A fly-half known for his goal-kicking abilities, McCombe was aged 18 when called upon in 1968 to replace an injured Mike Gibson for a Five Nations match against France at Colombes, making him the youngest ever Ireland player in that position. He kicked all of Ireland's points in a 6–16 loss, then didn't get another opportunity until 1975, when he displaced Mick Quinn in the Five Nations squad. Finishing as the tournament's top points-scorer (26), McCombe registered the winning try in their opening match against England and contributed 13 points in a win over France.

McCombe died on 12 March 2025, at the age of 76.

== See also ==
- List of Ireland national rugby union players
