= Terry Moore (rugby union) =

Irish rugby union player

- Full name: Terence Anthony Patrick Moore
- Born: 29 April 1945 Cork, Ireland
- Died: 17 June 2001 (aged 56) Galway, Ireland

Rugby union career
- Position: No. 8
International career
Years	Team	Apps	(Points)
1967–74	Ireland	12	(4)

Terence Anthony Patrick Moore (29 April 1945 — 17 June 2001) was an Irish international rugby union player.

Born in Cork, Moore was a Munster Senior Cup-winner with Highfield.

Moore, at 6 ft 4 in and 16 stone, was a large but mobile loose forward.

Between 1967 and 1974, Moore was capped 12 times for Ireland as a number eight. He had yet to earn a cap when he made the Ireland squad for the 1967 tour of Australia and debuted in the one-off Test against the Wallabies in Sydney, which they won. It wasn't until 1973 that he got another opportunity, playing in a draw against the All Blacks at Lansdowne Road. He was in the Ireland team which won the 1974 Five Nations.

Moore also represented the Ireland national basketball team.

== See also ==
- List of Ireland national rugby union players
