= Alan Duggan =

Irish rugby union player

- Full name: Alan Thomas Anthony Duggan
- Born: 11 June 1942 (age 84) Dublin, Ireland

Rugby union career
- Position: Wing
International career
Years	Team	Apps	(Points)
1963–72	Ireland	25	(34)

Alan Thomas Anthony Duggan (born 11 June 1942) is an Irish former rugby union international.

Duggan, born in Dublin, was a winger who played for Lansdowne, Leinster and Ireland during his career.

Capped 25 times for Ireland, Duggan debuted against the All Blacks at Lansdowne Road in 1963 and was on Ireland's historic 1967 tour of Australia, where they secured a first ever away win over the Wallabies. His 11 international tries set a then record for an Ireland winger. A broken leg brought an end to his career at the age of 30.

== See also ==
- List of Ireland national rugby union players
