= Ysgol Greenhill School =

School in Tenby, Wales

Ysgol Greenhill School is a secondary school in the coastal town of Tenby, Pembrokeshire. With approximately 1200 pupils on roll, it is one of the largest secondary schools in Wales.

== History ==
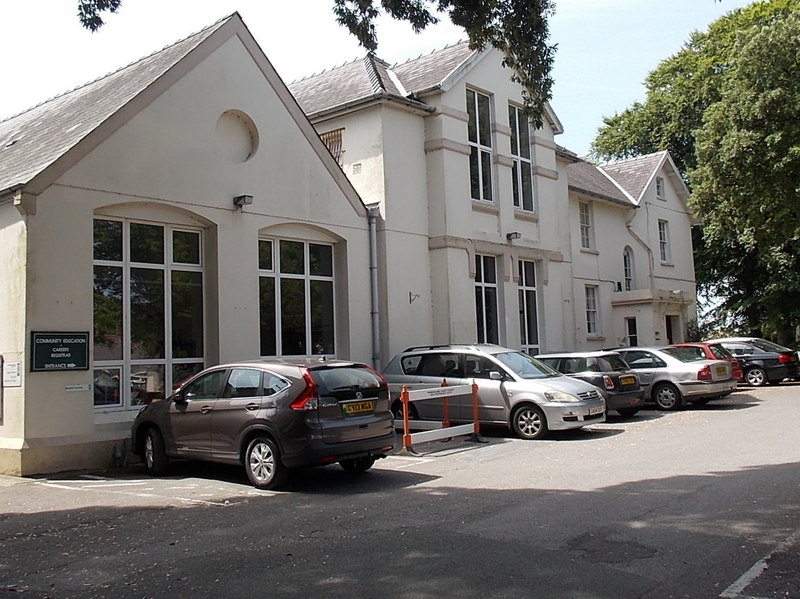
The "Greenhill Centre and Library" which was Ysgol Greenhill School

The school was originally a grammar school and was situated on Greenhill Road, Tenby. The school moved into its current premises, between Heywood Lane and Marsh Road in 1962 and the former school became Tenby Library. The school eventually turned into a comprehensive school.

== Improvements ==
In its complex the school has a sixth form centre for post-16 education, a futuristic building which was designed to be energy efficient and environmentally friendly, it was opened in 1999. A new extension to the school has now been completed. The new development means that there are now new IT suites, new Design and Technology rooms (such as textiles and catering), a renovated Art department and new Learning Support rooms. There has also been a redesign to the ground floor, opening out the area of the school.

== Music ==
The school also has an award-winning orchestra. Greenhill Orchestra has won the National Urdd Competition and got to the Music for Youth finals on several occasions and in July 2009 they came joint first. Concerts are held regularly at the school. Apart from the orchestra the school also has a windband, Jazz band and symphony orchestra. Steffan Ciccotti, an ex-member, came 3rd in the 2009 young musician of Wales.

== Sport ==
The school has many sports facilities. It has two large gyms, seven tennis courts that double up as all weather playing spaces. It also has an all-weather astro-turf for the school football and hockey teams, which see success in regional and national competition. Rugby is played on the main school playing field, along with athletics.

== Notable alumni ==
- Kate Lamb, actress in Call the Midwife
- Tom Shanklin, Wales rugby union international
- Kenneth Griffith, actor and film maker
- Liam Cullen, football player (Swansea City)
