= Pierre Villepreux =

France international rugby union player & coach

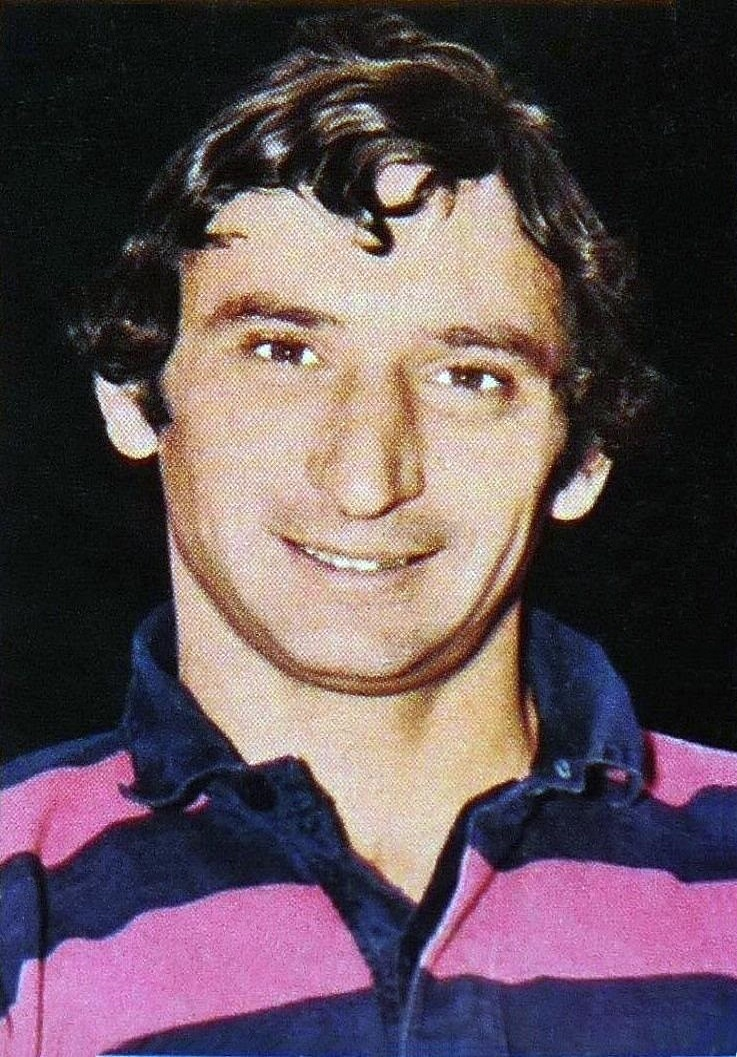
Pierre Villepreux in 1971

Pierre Villepreux (born 5 July 1943) is a former French rugby union player and coach. He played at full back and fly half for Toulouse, and won 34 caps for France between 1967 and 1972.

Villepreux was born in Pompadour. While Villepreux had a distinguished career as a player, World Rugby had the following to say about him when he was inducted into the World Rugby Hall of Fame in 2018:

However, it was as an innovative, free-thinking coach that Villepreux was revered throughout the rugby world. He took as his coaching creed "flexibility and adaptability, not organisation” and espoused the traditional open French style of play.

He coached the Italy national rugby union team from 1978 until 1981, and then returned to Toulouse as head coach. Working alongside Jean-Claude Skrela, he coached Toulouse to the national title in 1985, the club's first since 1947, and would lead them to two more titles. After leaving Toulouse in 1989, he continued coaching in the European club ranks until France hired Skrela as its new head coach after a disappointing 1995 Rugby World Cup campaign. Skrela then tabbed Villepreux as his top assistant. The partnership proved successful, with France winning the 1997 and 1998 Five Nations titles and reaching the 1999 Rugby World Cup Final under their leadership.

After the 1999 World Cup, he became technical director for the French Rugby Federation, and still later went on to work as Regional Development Manager for Europe in the Rugby Services division of the International Rugby Board, now known as World Rugby.

== See also ==
- Mark Egan

Sporting positions
Preceded by (Wales) Gwyn Evans	Italy National Rugby Union Coach; 1978–1981	Succeeded by (Italy) Paolo Paladini/Marco Pulli
