= Wallace McMaster =

Rugby union player from Northern Ireland

- Full name: Arthur Wallace McMaster
- Born: 2 December 1945 Ballymena, Northern Ireland
- Died: 24 February 2026 (age 80)
- School: Ballymena Academy

Rugby union career
- Position: Wing
International career
Years	Team	Apps	(Points)
1972–76	Ireland	18	(8)

Arthur Wallace McMaster (born 2 December 1945) is an Irish former international rugby union player.

Born in Ballymena, McMaster was a defensively-minded three-quarter, fast on the break, who played his club rugby with Ballymena RFC. He most often appeared on the left wing and was a regular for Ulster.

McMaster won 18 Ireland caps, debuting in the 1972 Five Nations. He was a Five Nations winner in 1974 and made his last Ireland appearance against the All Blacks in Wellington on their 1976 tour.

== See also ==
- List of Ireland national rugby union players
