= Dick Milliken =

Ireland rugby union player

Richard "Dick" Alexander Milliken (born 2 September 1950) is a former Ulster, Ireland and British & Irish Lions international rugby union player who played club rugby for his home town of Bangor. The official Lions website records that he was "one of the unsung heroes of the triumphant" tour.

== Education ==
Milliken is a geography graduate of Queen's University Belfast.

== Rugby playing career ==
Milliken captained Bangor Grammar School to their first Ulster Schools Cup win in 1969. He made his debut for Ireland on 10 February 1973 against England at Lansdowne Road and scored a try in a home win. The following year he was part of the Ireland squad that won the Five Nations Championship. After only eight caps he was chosen to tour South Africa in 1974 with the British and Irish Lions, playing as outside centre in all four Test matches, in which he scored one try. He played in 13 tour games overall and touched down for five tries. Unhappily the following year Milliken broke his leg and ankle together in a fairly meaningless" trial match. Following the injury he never regained his full athletic capabilities and was unable to add to his 14 Irish caps. Nevertheless, he continued to play rugby for his home town Bangor and captained the second team in the 1977/78 season. He was also Ulster's chairman of selectors until he stepped down 1995.

== Business career ==
Milliken was a chartered accountant, CEO of Investment Bank of Ireland CEO, a director of Bank of Ireland Mortgage Bank and a non-executive director of Ryanair.
