= Seamus Dennison =

Irish rugby union player

- Full name: Seamus Patrick Dennison
- Born: 26 January 1950 (age 76) Abbeyfeale, Co. Limerick, Ireland

Rugby union career
- Position: Centre / Wing
International career
Years	Team	Apps	(Points)
1973–75	Ireland	3	(4)

Seamus Patrick Dennison (born 26 January 1950) is an Irish former rugby union international.

Dennison grew up in Abbeyfeale and began playing rugby union at Mungret College.

A three-quarter, Dennison gained three caps for Ireland during the early 1970s and was on the Munster team that defeated the All Blacks at Thomond Park in 1978, with his crunching tackle on Stu Wilson still talked about.

Dennison, a retired teacher, also played for Connacht, the University of Galway and Garryowen.

== See also ==
- List of Ireland national rugby union players
