= Dick Cowman =

England international rugby union player

- Born: Alan Richard Cowman; 18 March 1949 (age 77) Workington, Cumbria
- University: Loughborough University

Rugby union career
- Position: Fly-half
Senior career
Years	Team	Apps	(Points)
- Loughborough Colleges RFC
International career
Years	Team	Apps	(Points)
1971-1973	England	5	(Pts:6; Tries:0; Conv:0; Pens:0; Drop:2)

Dick Cowman is a former rugby union international who represented England from 1971 to 1973.

== Early life ==
Dick Cowman was born on 18 March 1949 in Workington.

== Rugby union career ==
Cowman made his international debut on 20 Mar 1971 at Twickenham in the England vs Scotland match. Of the 5 matches he played for his national side he was never on the winning side. He played his final match for England on 10 February 1973 at Lansdowne Road in the Ireland vs England match.
