= Sean Lynch (rugby union) =

Irish rugby union player

John Francis "Sean" Lynch (born 22 October 1942) is a former Ireland international rugby union player He played for and captained Leinster. He owns the Swan Bar on Aungier Street in Dublin

Lynch was capped 17 times as a prop for Ireland between 1971 and 1975 and toured New Zealand in 1971 with the British and Irish Lions playing in all four tests against the All Blacks. He played club rugby for St. Mary's College R.F.C.
