= Arthur Lewis (rugby union) =

Rugby union player (1941–2026)

- Born: Arthur John Llewellyn Lewis; 26 September 1941 Crumlin, Caerphilly, Wales
- Died: 20 May 2026 (aged 84)
- Height: 181 cm (5 ft 11 in)
- Weight: 81 kg (12 st 11 lb)
- Occupation: Electrician

Rugby union career
- Position: Centre
Amateur team(s)
| Years | Team | Apps | (Points) |
- Crumlin RFC
- Cross Keys RFC
- Ebbw Vale RFC
- Barbarian F.C.
International career
| Years | Team | Apps | (Points) |
| 1970–1973 | Wales | 11 | (4) |
| 1971 | British Lions | 0 | (0) |

Arthur John Llewellyn Lewis (26 September 1941 – 20 May 2026) was a Wales international rugby union player who won 11 caps. In 1971 he toured New Zealand with the British & Irish Lions and at the time played club rugby for Ebbw Vale. Lewis came from Crumlin, and was educated at Cross Keys Technical College.

Lewis died after a long illness on 20 May 2026, aged 84.
