= Tony Jorden =

England international rugby union player & cricketer

- Full name: Anthony Mervyn Jorden
- Born: 28 January 1947 Radlett, Hertfordshire, England
- Died: 20 October 2023 (aged 76)
- School: Monmouth School
- University: Cambridge University

Rugby union career
- Position: Fullback
International career
Years	Team	Apps	(Points)
1970–1975	England	7	(22)
- Cricket career

Cricket information
- Batting: Right-handed
- Bowling: Right-arm fast-medium
- Role: Bowler

Domestic team information
- Years: Team
- 1966–1970: Essex
- 1968–1970: Cambridge University
- 1975–1977: Bedfordshire

Career statistics
Competition	First-class	List A
Matches	89	6
Runs scored	1,112	36
Batting average	11.23	12.00
100s/50s	0/3	0/0
Top score	67*	21
Balls bowled	10,836	348
Wickets	176	11
Bowling average	30.38	17.36
5 wickets in innings	1	0
10 wickets in match	0	0
Best bowling	5/95	3/41
Catches/stumpings	48/–	1/–
- Source: CricketArchive, 5 August 2019

Anthony Mervyn Jorden (28 January 1947 – 20 October 2023) was an English sportsman who played international rugby union for England and first-class cricket.

== Education ==
Jorden attended Monmouth School before going up to Fitzwilliam College, Cambridge, where he represented the university at both rugby union and cricket.

== Cricket career ==
Jorden began playing cricket for the Essex Second XI in 1964 and two years later broke into their County Championship side for the first time. A right-arm fast-medium bowler, he went on to take a total of 117 first-class wickets for Essex, at an average of 29.92.

From 1968 until 1970, he proved to be a capable wicket-taker for Cambridge University as well, with 57 first-class wickets at 31.66. He took a career high 50 wickets in the 1968 season, which he spent playing for both Essex and Cambridge University. It was with Cambridge that he took the only five wicket haul of his career, against Sussex in 1969. Jorden dismissed five of the top six Sussex batsmen in the first innings to claim figures of 5-95. He captained the university team in 1969 and 1970. He also played one first-class match for a combined Oxford and Cambridge Universities team.

He played Minor Counties and List A cricket for Bedfordshire from 1975 to 1977.

== Rugby career ==
Just as his first-class cricket career was coming to an end in 1970, Jorden was called up to the England rugby union team, who were to play against France in Paris, as a replacement at fullback for Bob Hiller. As England's designated kicker, Jorden slotted two conversions and a penalty, but France won the Test 35–13. He didn't play again until the 1973 Five Nations Championship, where he made three appearances and contributed 15 points with the boot. His next cap came against France in 1974 and he made two further appearances, both in 1975. He ended his Test career with seven caps and 22 points, but no tries.

Over the course of his rugby career, he played for the Barbarians, Blackheath, Bedford, Eastern Counties and London.

Jorden died in October 2023, aged 76.
