= Bobby Clark (rugby union) =

Scotland international rugby union player

- Born: Robert Lawson Clark; 27 January 1944 (age 82) Edinburgh, Scotland

Rugby union career
- Position: Hooker
Amateur team(s)
| Years | Team | Apps | (Points) |
- Melville College FP
| – | Edinburgh Wanderers | | |
| – | Royal Navy | | |
Provincial / State sides
| Years | Team | Apps | (Points) |
- Edinburgh District
International career
| Years | Team | Apps | (Points) |
| 1971 | Scotland 'B' | 1 | |
| 1972-73 | Scotland | 9 | (4) |

Bobby Clark (born 27 January 1944) is a former Scotland rugby union international player.

== Rugby Union career ==
=== Amateur career ===
He played for Melville College.

He played for Edinburgh Wanderers.

He also played rugby union for the Royal Navy.

=== Provincial career ===
He played for Edinburgh District and captained the side. He was part of that season's squad that won the Scottish Inter-District Championship in a play-off in the 1971-72 season, although he did not play in the play-off match.

=== International career ===
He was capped by Scotland 'B' to play France 'B' in 1971.

He went on to play for Scotland 9 times. He scored a try in the 5 February 1972 match against Wales; although Scotland slumped to a 35-12 defeat in the match.

== Academic career ==
He worked for many years as a Staff Tutor in the Faculty of Technology within the Open University.
