= Claude Dourthe =

French rugby union player (born 1948)

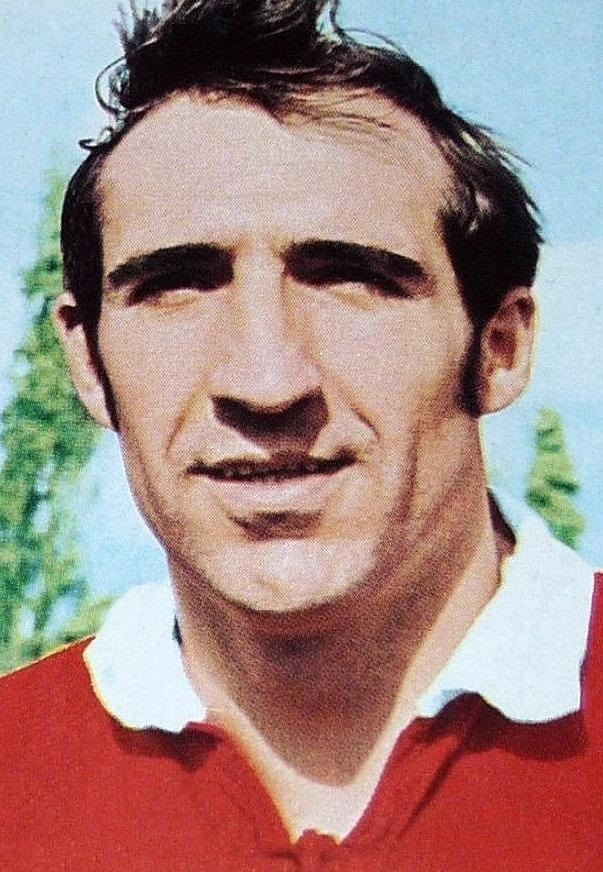
- Dourthe in 1971
- Born: 20 November 1948 (age 77) Magescq, France
- Height: 1.78 m (5 ft 10 in)

Rugby union career
- Position: Centre
Senior career
Years	Team	Apps	(Points)
1965–1977	Dax		
International career
Years	Team	Apps	(Points)
1966–1975	France	33	(40)

Claude Dourthe (born 20 November 1948) is a former French rugby union player. He played as a centre.

Dourthe played for US Dax, where he was runners-up of the French Championship, in 1965/66, and twice winner of the Challenge Yves du Manoir, in 1969 and 1971, being a finalist too in 1968.

He had 33 caps for France, from 1966 to 1975, scoring 10 tries and 1 drop goal, 40 points on aggregate. He had his debut at the 9–3 win over Romania, at 27 December 1966, in Bucharest, aged only 18 years old, for the 1966–67 FIRA Nations Cup. He participated in three Five Nations Championship competitions, being a winner in 1967, and also playing in 1972 and 1975. He had 13 caps for the competition, scoring 4 tries, 14 points on aggregate. His last game was at the 10–9 win over Scotland, at 15 February 1975, in Paris, for the 1975 Five Nations Championship, where he was the captain and scored his final try for the national team.
