= Jeremy Janion =

England international rugby union player (born 1946)

Jeremy Paul Aubrey George Janion (born 25 September 1946) was a rugby union international wing who represented England in twelve matches between 1971 and 1975.

Janion was educated at St. Edmund's College, Ware. He played for Saffron Walden, Bedford and London Counties before beginning his test career with an appearance for England U-25s against Fiji in 1970. He later left Bedford for Richmond from where he won the last of his England caps. He was a member of the Richmond team that won the Middlesex Sevens in 1974 and then played for Eastern Counties in the 1975 County Championship final.
