= Nairn MacEwan =

Tanzanian-Scottish rugby union footballer and coach

- Born: Nairn Alexander MacEwan; 12 December 1941 Dar es Salaam, Tanzania
- Died: 31 May 2018 (aged 76)

Rugby union career
- Position: Flanker
Amateur team(s)
Years	Team	Apps	(Points)
- Highland RFC
International career
Years	Team	Apps	(Points)
1971-75	Scotland	20	
Coaching career
- Years: Team
- 1977-80: Scotland
- –: Rugby Rovigo

Nairn Alexander MacEwan (12 December 1941 – 31 May 2018) was a Scottish international rugby player and coach. He played at flanker, and was capped twenty times for Scotland between 1971 and 1975, including a try in the match against England in 1972.

== Playing career ==
MacEwan was born in Dar es Salaam, modern Tanzania.

Unusually for a top level Scottish rugby player, MacEwan was a Highlander, and Highland based. As Allan Massie says:

There have been fine players too who missed Lions selection: ... Nairn MacEwan, a great mauler whose enthusiasm for the game was so great that he travelled thousands of miles between his home in Inverness and his club Gala.

MacEwan helped Highland RFC to their "years of glory in the Seventies, when guided and inspired by [him], they shot up through the divisions, but they have since fallen away, and are now a run of the mill Second Division outfit."

Bill McLaren notes that Bill Dickinson included MacEwan in "one of the most formidable packs of all time", alongside the Scottish rugby greats like Ian McLauchlan, Sandy Carmichael, Alistair McHarg, Gordon Brown, Peter Brown and Rodger Arneil. However, once when Scotland played England at Twickenham, England coach John Burgess made the notorious comment,

I've seen this Scottish pack rucking. If it's blood on their boots they want, that's what they'll get.

Nairn MacEwan was taken off the field in this game after only two minutes.

== Coaching ==
MacEwan became the second national coach for Scotland in 1977 (a position which was unpaid at the time), succeeding Bill Dickinson, but was unsuccessful over the next three seasons—Scotland only won one game in this period. MacEwan was succeeded by Jim Telfer.

MacEwan also coached the Italian side Rugby Rovigo.

MacEwan died on 31 May 2018.

Preceded by Bill Dickinson	Scotland national rugby union team coach 1977–1980	Succeeded by Jim Telfer
