= Colin Telfer =

Scotland international rugby union player & coach

- Born: Colin McLeod Telfer; 26 February 1947 (age 79) Hawick, Scotland

Rugby union career
- Position: Flyhalf
Amateur team(s)
Years	Team	Apps	(Points)
- Hawick
Provincial / State sides
Years	Team	Apps	(Points)
- South of Scotland District
International career
Years	Team	Apps	(Points)
1968-76	Scotland	17	(18)
Coaching career
- Years: Team
- 1984: Scotland

Colin McLeod Telfer (born 26 February 1947, in Hawick) is a former Scotland international rugby union player. He played at fly-half.

== Rugby Union career ==
=== Amateur career ===
He went to the Royal High School in Edinburgh, but did not go on to play for Royal HSFP.

He instead played for Hawick.

=== Provincial career ===
He played for South of Scotland District and captained the side.

=== International career ===
He was capped seventeen times for Scotland between 1968 and 1976.

=== Coaching career ===
He was Head Coach of Scotland in 1984.

== Bibliography ==
- Bath, Richard, ed. (1997). Complete Book of Rugby. Seven Oaks Ltd. ISBN 1-86200-013-1.
- Bath, Richard ed (2007). The Scotland Rugby Miscellany. Vision Sports Publishing Ltd. ISBN 1-905326-24-6.
- Jones, J.R. (1976). Encyclopedia of Rugby Union Football. Robert Hale, London, ISBN 0-7091-5394-5.

Preceded by Jim Telfer	Scotland national rugby union team coach 1984	Succeeded by Derrick Grant
