= Ray McLoughlin =

Irish rugby union player (1939–2021)

- Born: Raymond John McLoughlin; 24 August 1939 Ballinasloe, Ireland
- Died: 20 November 2021 (aged 82)
- School: Garbally
- University: University College Dublin

Rugby union career
- Position: Prop
Senior career
Years	Team	Apps	(Points)
- University College Dublin
–	Blackrock College		
–	Gosforth Rugby Football Club		
–	London Irish		
–	Barbarian F.C.		
Provincial / State sides
Years	Team	Apps	(Points)
- Connacht
International career
Years	Team	Apps	(Points)
1962–1975	Ireland	40	(4)
1966–1971	British Lions	3	(3)

Raymond John McLoughlin (21 August 1939 – 20 November 2021) was an Irish rugby union international who was capped 40 times at prop, an Irish record at the time. He began at tight head, moving to the open side on his return to the Ireland team in 1971 after a five-year absence. McLoughlin captained his country on seven occasions. He was selected for two test series with the British Lions and played for invitational tourists the Barbarians. McLoughlin also had a long career at club and provincial level, representing Connacht. After his death he was credited with developing the eight-man scrum.

== Early life ==
He was born in Ahascragh, Ballinasloe, Co Galway, Ireland, and received his secondary school education at Garbally College and Blackrock College. He is one of five children of Tadhg Mac Lochlainn and Mel Kelly. He was a brother of Colm and Feidlim McLoughlin.

McLoughlin played for Ballinasloe, Athlone and Blackrock and studied at University College Dublin, graduating with a degree in chemical engineering and playing for the university club; later he represented Gosforth, Northumberland and the British Universities.

== Rugby career ==
He toured twice with the British Lions, in 1966 to Australia and New Zealand and again in 1971 to New Zealand. Both tours saw McLoughlin injured, though in the 1966 tour he managed to play in three Tests before being forced to retire. However, in 1971 he managed just five provincial games before he broke his thumb in a very violent game against Canterbury.

McLoughlin's knowledge and scenario planning were highly valued by other good players. John Taylor, who toured with McLoughlin with the British Lions in 1971, described him as "one of the best technicians the game has ever known". Sports columnist Bill Bridge in 2008 named him as Ireland's best open-side prop of the previous 40 years.

== Business career ==
Outside rugby, McLoughlin was a business man. In 1973 he was the chief executive of James Crean, an industrial holdings company. As of 2006 he was the chairman of Oakhill printing group.

== Death ==
He died on 20 November 2021, aged 82.
