= Jean-Pierre Lux =

French rugby union footballer (1946–2020)

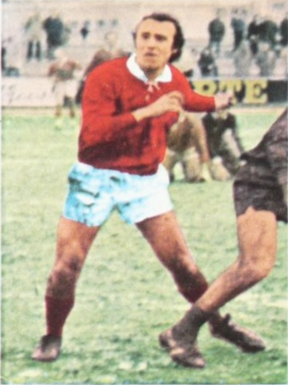
- Born: January 9, 1946 Saint-Vincent-de-Tyrosse, France
- Died: December 15, 2020 (aged 74)

Rugby union career
- Position: Centre
International career
Years	Team	Apps	(Points)
1967–1975	France	42	(42)

Jean-Pierre Lux (9 January 1946 – 15 December 2020). was a French rugby union player and sports director. He played as a centre. He was professionally a dental surgeon.

== Club career ==
Lux played for US Tyrosse until 1970/71, moving to US Dax in 1971/72. He was runner-up of the French Championship in 1972/73.

== International career ==
He had 42 caps for France, from 1967 to 1975, scoring 12 tries, 42 points on aggregate. He entered in 9 consecutive editions of the Five Nations Championship, from 1967 to 1975, playing 27 caps and scoring 5 tries, 18 points on aggregate. He won the tournament three times, in 1967, 1968, with a Grand Slam, and 1970, ex-aequo with Wales.

== Sports director career ==
He was President of the European Rugby Cup, from 1999 to 2014. He was a member of the director committee of the National Rugby League, from 1998 to 2012.
