= Alan Old =

England international rugby union player and cricketer

- Born: Alan Gerald Bernard Old; 23 September 1945 (age 81) Middlesbrough, England

Rugby union career
Senior career
Years	Team	Apps	(Points)
- Durham University RFC
International career
Years	Team	Apps	(Points)
	England	16	

Alan Gerald Bernard Old (born 23 September 1945) is an English rugby union player who had 16 caps for England.

Old was an undergraduate at Queen Mary College and later studied for a year at Durham University, where he competed for Durham University RFC. In 1970 he was selected for North-Eastern Counties in their match against South Africa at Gosforth, part of the controversial 1969–70 South Africa rugby union tour of Britain and Ireland.

He made his debut for England against Wales in 1972 and made a further 15 appearances with his final one being against France in 1978. His 16 caps included four wins, although these were against New Zealand, South Africa, Australia and Wales. Old also played in the famous victory of the North of England over the touring All Blacks at Otley in 1979 with the English regional side running out 21–9 winners.

Old was selected for the 1974 British Lions tour to South Africa but was replaced by Phil Bennett at fly-half after sustaining an injury. He played in only four matches on the tour, scoring a then-record 37 points in the match against South West Districts. His tour was ended by a serious leg injury in the match against the Proteas.

He was often more admired by England fans than by the selectors. On one occasion, a fan was so enraged when a player whom he considered to be inferior was selected in Old's place that he reputedly composed a letter of complaint pointing out the many ways in which Old would have been a better choice and then sent a copy to each member of the selection committee, written in Braille.

Old is the brother of former England fast bowler Chris Old, and the brothers achieved a notable feat when Alan represented his country against Scotland at Murrayfield, whilst Chris was playing for England against the West Indies in the Caribbean. Alan was also a cricketer, playing 40 Minor County matches for Durham between 1968 and 1978 and one 2nd X1 appearance for Middlesex against Kent in 1970. He also played in one first-class match for Warwickshire against Cambridge University in 1969.

After the end of his playing career, Alan Old became a successful educationalist, serving as the Principal of Cleveland Technical College, having already been a master at Worksop College and a mathematics teacher at Myers Grove Comprehensive in Sheffield and Sir William Turner's Grammar School, Redcar during his playing career.
