= John Moloney (rugby union) =

Irish rugby union player

John Joseph Moloney (born 27 August 1949) is a former Ireland international rugby union player. He toured South Africa in 1974 with the British and Irish Lions and at the time played club rugby for St. Mary's College R.F.C.
