= Barry McGann =

Irish rugby union player (1948–2025)

- Full name: Barry John McGann
- Born: 28 May 1948 Cork, Ireland
- Died: 8 November 2025 (aged 77) Greystones, County Wicklow, Ireland
- School: Presentation Brothers College

Rugby union career
- Position: Fly-half
International career
Years	Team	Apps	(Points)
1969–76	Ireland	25	(72)

Barry John McGann (28 May 1948 – 8 November 2025) was an Irish rugby union international.

== Biography ==
A Cork native, McGann is a product of Presentation Brothers College, which he captained to a Munster Schools Senior Cup title, while also showing promise as a soccer player. He notably turned down an offer for a trial at Manchester United. On the soccer field, McGann represented Ireland at the 1965 UEFA European Under-18 Championship, where his team had a win over a Dutch side featuring Johann Cruyff, then in 1966 helped Glasheen win the FAI Youth Cup. He played for Shelbourne in the 1968-69 League of Ireland, but would otherwise turn his focus to rugby going forward.

McGann was a fly-half in rugby, playing at club level for Cork Constitution and Lansdowne. He made his Ireland debut in 1969 as a replacement for an injured Mike Gibson and performed well enough that Gibson was moved to the centres on his return. Capped 25 times for Ireland, McGann is perhaps best remembered for his conversion attempt against the All Blacks at Lansdowne Road in 1973, with scores level in the dying moments. Ireland had never beaten the All Blacks and McGann's kick, from near the touchline, missed by mere inches. Some accounts say the kick was on target until a gust of wind blew it wide, while McGann has remained convinced that the kick had gone through the posts.

McGann died on 8 November 2025, at the age of 77.

== See also ==
- List of Ireland national rugby union players
