= William Steele (rugby union) =

British Lions & Scotland international rugby union player

William Charles Common Steele (born 18 April 1947) also known as Billy Steele, is a former Scotland international rugby union player.

The first club he played for was Langholm RFC, in his hometown of Langholm in south west Scotland.

He represented the British & Irish Lions on the 1974 tour to South Africa and at the time played club rugby for Bedford F.C.

His "day job" was in the RAF.

As Richard Bath says:

"Never the quickest of wingers, Steele's gritty defensive qualities and combative nature combined perfectly with some of the more attacking Scottish internationals of his day, particularly Andy Irvine and David Shedden."
