= Bill Dickinson =

Scottish rugby union footballer and coach (1917–1994)

- Born: William Dickinson; 1917
- Died: 7 April 1994 (aged 76–77)

Rugby union career
Amateur team(s)
Years	Team	Apps	(Points)
- Hillhead RFC
–	Jordanhill RFC		
Coaching career
- Years: Team
- 1971-1977: Scotland

Bill Dickinson (1917 – 7 April 1994) was a Scottish rugby union player and coach. He was appointed the first official national coach of Scotland in 1971. Allan Massie describes his contribution to Scottish rugby as "immense".

== Coaching career ==
Many of the SRU committee were not in favour of a national coach, so in 1971, Dickinson was named "adviser to the captain" rather than "coach". It being the amateur era, Dickinson was also unpaid for his work.

"For a few years Dickinson's teams were unbeatable at Murrayfield where at one point they won nine championship victories in succession. Their success and the advent of Andy Irvine, gave the game a popularity it had not seen before. When Wales came north in 1975, 104,000 people crammed into Murrayfield and it is estimated that almost 20,000 more were turned away. Thereafter all major internationals had to be all-ticket."

He was also coach of Jordanhill, where he worked with Ian McLauchlan. Bill McLaren considered that McLauchlan's success was partly down to Dickinson:

"he had a sage and uncompromising guide in... Bill Dickinson. McLauchlan wasn't taken seriously when he first hit the big time. For one thing he had a roly-poly build and weighed in at just over 13 stones. I have to admit when I first saw him I thought he was just too small for the international game... I doubted that a player of McLauchlan's physique could hold his own with such giants. Hold his own? He gave them all a hell of a time! He posed all kinds of different problems for them because of his shape but also because of his strength which, along with his weight, was being boosted by special training supervised by the crafty Dickinson."

His teams were less successful in away games, and they did not win any games at Twickenham between 1971 and 1983, or any away games against France.

He was fired by the SRU in 1977, and succeeded by Nairn McEwan.

Preceded by	Scotland national rugby union team coach 1971–1977	Succeeded by Nairn McEwan
