= 1971 British Lions tour to New Zealand and Australia =

Rugby union tour

- Date: 12 May – 14 August
- Coach: (Wales) Carwyn James
- Tour captain: (Wales) John Dawes
- Test series winners: British Lions (2–1)
- Top test point scorer: (Wales) Barry John (30)
Summary
P	W	D	L
Total
26	23	1	2
Test match
4	2	1	1
Opponent
P	W	D	L
New Zealand
4	2	1	1

Tour chronology
- ← South Africa 1968 South Africa 1974 →

In 1971 the British Lions toured New Zealand, also playing two matches in Australia. Despite losing the first match to Queensland the tour was a great success, the Lions winning the Test series against the All Blacks. They are still the only Lions side to have won a Test series in New Zealand. The side was captained by John Dawes, coached by Carwyn James and managed by Doug Smith.

== Background ==
The Lions had done poorly when touring New Zealand in 1966, losing all four Tests to the All Blacks. However, Wales had won the Grand Slam in the Five Nations Championship in 1971 and supplied more players than any other home nation to the touring squad. Both the coach and captain were also Welsh.

New Zealand, after a long period of success, had lost their most recent series in 1970 away to South Africa.

== Key factors ==
A major factor in their victory was self belief. Gerald Davies explained, "...somewhere along the line it becomes a mental thing...We grew in confidence; we came to believe it was possible to beat the All Blacks." The coaching team had also done important reconnaissance work.

Colin Meads said Mervyn Davies was "the one player who probably had the biggest impact on that 1971 Lions Test series," particularly as he prevented New Zealand winning line out ball via Brian Lochore.

== Test series ==
The Lions won the first Test in Dunedin 9–3, with a penalty goal to the All Blacks, and two penalties and a try, (scored by Ian McLauchlan) to the Lions. Several Lions players later admitted they were overconfident following their initial Test victory. The Lions were thus convincingly beaten 22–12 in the second Test in Christchurch, with the All Blacks outscoring them five tries (Bob Burgess (2), Sid Going, Ian Kirkpatrick, pen try) to two (Davies (2)). The third Test was played at Athletic Park, Wellington. The Lions did not make the same mistake they had in Christchurch, resulting in a 13–3 win, the Lions scored two converted tries and a drop goal. The All Blacks managed only a try.

Following the third Test the Lions led the series 2–1. The final game played in Auckland would require an All Black victory for New Zealand to draw the series. A draw or Lions victory would give the Lions a series win. Scores were level 8–8 at half time with a try, conversion and penalty each. The first 15 minutes of the second half saw the Lions land a penalty goal and the All Blacks score a try. With the scores tied 11–11, Lions fullback J. P. R. Williams received the ball 45 metres out and attempted a drop goal, it was successful and put the Lions ahead 14–11. Williams's drop goal was the only one he landed in his Test career. The All Blacks could only manage three further points from a penalty to draw the game 14-14, which gave the Lions the series.

== Squad ==
=== Backs ===
- John Dawes (London Welsh and Wales) (captain)
- J. P. R. Williams (London Welsh and Wales)
- Bob Hiller (Harlequins and England)
- John C Bevan (Cardiff and Wales)
- Alastair Biggar (London Scottish and Scotland)
- Gerald Davies (London Welsh and Wales)
- David Duckham (Coventry and England)^{[a]}
- Arthur Lewis (Ebbw Vale and Wales)
- John Spencer (Headingley and England)
- Chris Rea (West of Scotland and Scotland)
- Mike Gibson (North of Ireland FC and Ireland)
- Barry John (Cardiff and Wales)
- Gareth Edwards (Cardiff and Wales)
- Chico Hopkins (Maesteg and Wales)
- Chris Wardlow (Northampton and England) was an original selection but withdrew due to injury. His place was taken by Chris Rea

=== Forwards ===
- Frank Laidlaw (Melrose and Scotland)
- John Pullin (Bristol and England)
- Ian McLauchlan (Jordanhill College and Scotland)
- Sandy Carmichael (West of Scotland and Scotland)
- Sean Lynch (St Mary's College RFC and Ireland)
- Ray McLoughlin (Blackrock College RFC and Ireland)
- Stack Stevens (Harlequins and England)
- Gordon Brown (West of Scotland and Scotland)
- Geoff Evans (London Welsh and Wales)
- Willie John McBride (Ballymena and Ireland)
- Mike Roberts (London Welsh and Wales)
- Delme Thomas (Llanelli and Wales)
- Mike Hipwell (Terenure College RFC and Ireland)
- Rodger Arneil (Leicester and Scotland)
- Derek Quinnell (Llanelli)^{[b]}
- Fergus Slattery (University College Dublin RFC and Ireland)
- John Taylor (London Welsh and Wales)
- Mervyn Davies (London Welsh and Wales)
- Peter Dixon (Harlequins and England)^{[c]}

== Results ==
Match	Date	Opponent	Location	Result	Score
Match 1	12 May	Queensland	Ballymore, Brisbane	Lost	11–15
Match 2	15 May	New South Wales	Sydney Cricket Ground, Sydney	Won	14–12
Match 3	22 May	Counties / Thames Valley	Pukekohe Stadium, Pukekohe	Won	25–3
Match 4	26 May	Wanganui / King Country	Spriggens Park, Wanganui	Won	22–9
Match 5	29 May	Waikato	Rugby Park, Hamilton	Won	35–14
Match 6	2 June	New Zealand Māori	Eden Park, Auckland	Won	23–12
Match 7	5 June	Wellington	Athletic Park, Wellington	Won	47–9
Match 8	9 June	South Canterbury / Mid Canterbury / North Otago	Fraser Park, Timaru	Won	25–6
Match 9	12 June	Otago	Carisbrook, Dunedin	Won	21–9
Match 10	16 June	West Coast-Buller	Rugby Park, Greymouth	Won	39–6
Match 11	19 June	Canterbury	Lancaster Park, Christchurch	Won	14– 3
Match 12	22 June	Marlborough / Nelson Bays	Lansdowne Park, Blenheim	Won	31–12
First Test	26 June	New Zealand	Carisbrook, Dunedin	Won	9–3
Match 14	30 June	Southland	Rugby Park, Invercargill	Won	25–3
Match 15	3 July	Taranaki	Rugby Park, New Plymouth	Won	14–9
Match 16	6 July	New Zealand Universities	Athletic Park, Wellington	Won	27–6
Second Test	10 July	New Zealand	Lancaster Park, Christchurch	Lost	12–22
Match 18	14 July	Wairarapa Bush	Memorial Park, Masterton	Won	27–6
Match 19	17 July	Hawke's Bay	McLean Park, Napier	Won	25–6
Match 20	21 July	Poverty Bay / East Coast	Rugby Park, Gisborne	Won	18–12
Match 21	24 July	Auckland	Eden Park, Auckland	Won	19–12
Third Test	31 July	New Zealand	Athletic Park, Wellington	Won	13–3
Match 23	4 August	Manawatu / Horowhenua	Showgrounds, Palmerston North	Won	39–6
Match 24	7 August	North Auckland	Okara Park, Whangarei	Won	11–5
Match 25	10 August	Bay of Plenty	Tauranga Domain, Tauranga	Won	20–14
Fourth Test	14 August	New Zealand	Eden Park, Auckland	Draw	14–14

The Canterbury game was particularly violent.

== Tests ==
=== First Test ===
26 June 1971

New Zealand	3–9	British Lions
Pen: McCormick	Report	Try: McLauchlan; Pen: John (2/6)

Carisbrook, Dunedin
Attendance: 45,000
Referee: John Pring (New Zealand)

Team details

FB	15	Fergie McCormick
RW	14	Bruce Hunter
OC	13	Wayne Cottrell
IC	12	Bryan Williams
LW	11	Ken Carrington
FH	10	Bob Burgess
SH	9	Sid Going
N8	8	Alan Sutherland
FL	7	Ian Kirkpatrick
FL	6	Alan McNaughton
RL	5	Colin Meads (c)
LL	4	Peter Whiting
PR	3	Brian Muller
HK	2	Tane Norton
PR	1	Richie Guy
Replacements:
HK	16
PR	17
PR	18
LK	19
FL	20
SH	21
FH	22
CE	23
Coach:
(New Zealand) Ivan Vodanovich

FB	15	(Wales) J. P. R. Williams
RW	14	(Wales) Gerald Davies
OC	13	(Wales) John Dawes (c)
IC	12	(Ireland) Mike Gibson
LW	11	(Wales) John Bevan
FH	10	(Wales) Barry John
SH	9	(Wales) Gareth Edwards	(substituted off) 5'
N8	8	(Wales) Mervyn Davies
FL	7	(Wales) John Taylor
FL	6	(England) Peter Dixon
RL	5	(Ireland) Willie John McBride
LL	4	(Wales) Delme Thomas
PR	3	(Ireland) Sean Lynch
HK	2	(England) John Pullin
PR	1	(Scotland) Ian McLauchlan
Replacements:
LK	16	(Scotland) Gordon Brown
SH	17	(Wales) Chico Hopkins	(substituted on) 5'
WG	18	(England) David Duckham
HK	19	(Scotland) Frank Laidlaw
Coach:
(Wales) Carwyn James

=== Second Test ===
10 July 1971

New Zealand	22–12	British Lions
Try: Burgess (2); Going; Kirkpatrick; Penalty try Con: Mains (2); Pen: Mains	Report	Try: Davies (2); Pen: John; Drop: John

Lancaster Park, Christchurch
Attendance: 57,500
Referee: John Pring (New Zealand)

Team details

FB	15	Laurie Mains
RW	14	Bruce Hunter
OC	13	Howard Joseph
IC	12	Wayne Cottrell
LW	11	Bryan Williams
FH	10	Bob Burgess
SH	9	Sid Going
N8	8	Alex Wyllie
FL	7	Alan McNaughton
FL	6	Ian Kirkpatrick
RL	5	Colin Meads (c)
LL	4	Peter Whiting
PR	3	Brian Muller
HK	2	Tane Norton
PR	1	Richie Guy
Coach:
(New Zealand) Ivan Vodanovich

FB	15	(Wales) J. P. R. Williams
RW	14	(Wales) Gerald Davies
OC	13	(Wales) John Dawes (c)
IC	12	(Ireland) Mike Gibson
LW	11	(England) David Duckham
FH	10	(Wales) Barry John
SH	9	(Wales) Gareth Edwards
N8	8	(Wales) Mervyn Davies
FL	7	(Wales) John Taylor
FL	6	(England) Peter Dixon
RL	5	(Ireland) Willie John McBride
LL	4	(Wales) Delme Thomas
PR	3	(Ireland) Sean Lynch
HK	2	(England) John Pullin
PR	1	(Scotland) Ian McLauchlan
Coach:
(Wales) Carwyn James

=== Third Test ===
31 July 1971

New Zealand	3–13	British Lions
Try: Mains		Try: Davies; John; Con: John (2); Drop: John

Athletic Park, Wellington
Referee: John Pring (New Zealand)

NEW ZEALAND: Laurie Mains, Bruce Hunter, Howard Joseph, Wayne Cottrell, Ken Carrington, Bob Burgess (rep Mick Duncan), Sid Going, Brian Muller, Tane Norton, Richie Guy, Colin Meads (c), Brian Lochore, Alan McNaughton Ian Kirkpatrick, Alex Wyllie

LIONS: Williams, Gerald Davies, Dawes (c), Gibson, Duckham, John, Edwards, Lynch, Pullin, McLauchlan, McBride, Brown, Quinnell, Taylor, Mervyn Davies.

In the pack, the Lions selected Gordon Brown over Delme Thomas.

=== Fourth Test ===
14 August 1971

New Zealand	14–14	British Lions
Try: Cottrell; Lister; Con: Mains; Pen Mains (2)		Try: Dixon; Con: John; Drop: Williams; Pen: John (2)

Eden Park, Auckland
Referee: John Pring (New Zealand)

NEW ZEALAND: Laurie Mains, Ken Carrington, Mick Duncan, Phil Gard, Bryan Williams, Wayne Cottrell, Sid Going, Brian Muller, Tane Norton, Richie Guy, Colin Meads (c), Peter Whiting, Ian Kirkpatrick, Tom Lister, Alex Wyllie

LIONS: Williams, Gerald Davies, Dawes (c), Gibson, Duckham, John, Edwards, Lynch, Pullin, McLauchlan, McBride, Brown, Taylor, Dixon, Mervyn Davies. Thomas replaced injured Brown 60mins

== Appraisal ==
The 1971 Lions are often compared to the unbeaten 1974 British Lions tour to South Africa. Many of the players who played on the 1971 Lions tour believe the 1974 Lions team would have beaten the 1971 Lions team, due to having better forwards and because many of the 1971 players had become better players by 1974. J. P. R. Williams has said that while the 1971 Lions back division could not be bettered, the 1974 squad was better at winning games.

However South Africa had not played a test match for two years before playing the Lions, whereas the New Zealand team had been active. In addition the 1971 Lions overcame the mental hurdle of the Lions having lost every previous series in New Zealand before.

== Notes and references ==
=== Notes ===
^{a}Duckham had been playing for England at centre, but was selected on the wing.

^{b}Derek Quinnell had not been capped at the time of the 1971 tour, but later played for Wales.

^{c}Peter Dixon had not played for England at the time of his selection for the 1971 tour but then won his first cap against the President's Overseas XV on 17 April 1971 three weeks prior to the squad's departure for Australia.

== Bibliography ==
- Thomas, J. B. G. (1971). The Roaring Lions. London: Pelham Books. ISBN 0-7207-0545-2.
