= 1969–70 Scottish Inter-District Championship =

Rugby union competition

- Countries: Scotland
- Date: 1969–70
- Champions: South
- Runners-up: Glasgow District
- Matches played: 6

The 1969–70 Scottish Inter-District Championship was a rugby union competition for Scotland's district teams.

This season saw the 17th Scottish Inter-District Championship.

South won the competition with 2 wins and 1 draw.

== 1969-70 League Table ==
Team	P	W	D	L	PF	PA	+/-	Pts
South	3	2	1	0	49	29	+20	5
Glasgow District	3	2	0	1	35	22	+13	4
North and Midlands	3	1	0	2	30	47	-17	2
Edinburgh District	3	0	1	2	12	28	-16	1

== Results ==
Date	Try	Conversion	Penalty	Dropped goal	Goal from mark	Notes
1948–1970	3 points	2 points	3 points	3 points	3 points	

=== Round 1 ===
29 October 1969

Glasgow District	9 – 11	South
	Preview; Report

Hughenden Stadium
Referee: C. G. McCulloch (Melville College F. P.)

Glasgow District:
South:

=== Round 2 ===
1 November 1969

Edinburgh District	3 – 8	North and Midlands
	Preview; Report

Myreside
Referee: D. J. F. Ford (Middlesex)

Edinburgh District:
North and Midlands:

=== Round 3 ===
15 November 1969

South	32 – 14	North and Midlands
	Preview; Report

Mansfield Park
Referee: R. S. Waddell (Glasgow Academicals)

North and Midlands:
South:

=== Round 4 ===
13 December 1969

Glasgow District	14 – 3	Edinburgh District
	Preview; Report

Hughenden Stadium
Referee: R. P. Burrell (Gala)

Glasgow District:
Edinburgh District:

=== Round 5 ===
24 January 1970

Edinburgh District	6 – 6	South
	Preview; Report

Murrayfield Stadium
Referee: W. D. H. Davies (Swansea)

Edinburgh District':
'South:

=== Round 6 ===
14 February 1970

North and Midlands	8 – 12	Glasgow District
	Preview; Report

Murrayfield Stadium
Referee: H. B. Laidlaw (Hawick)

North and Midlands:
Glasgow District:

== Matches outwith the Championship ==
=== Other Scottish matches ===
26 November 1969

Combined Scottish Districts	31 – 12	Combined Services
Try: Alastair Biggar x 2 Duncan Paterson; Ian Robertson; John Frame; Sandy Hinshelwood x 2 Con: Peter Brown x 2 Pen: Gordon Macdonald x 2	Preview; Report	Try: Ian Smith; Pen: Ian Smith x 3

Murrayfield Stadium
Referee: T. B. Kearns (Leinster)

Combined Scottish Districts: Gordon Macdonald (London Scottish), Alastair Biggar (London Scottish), John Frame (Gala), Chris Rea (West of Scotland), Sandy Hinshelwood (London Scottish), Ian Robertson (Watsonians), Duncan Paterson (Gala), Ian McLauchlan (Jordanhill College), Frank Laidlaw (Melrose), Sandy Carmichael (West of Scotland), Peter Brown (Gala), Gordon Brown (West of Scotland), M. J. Mason (Harlequins), Jim Telfer (Melrose) [captain], Rodger Arneil (Leicester)
Combined Services: Ian Smith (Army), J. Green (RN), A. E. Docherty (RAF), G. Jones (RN), J. Kirk (Army), G. B. L. Campbell (Army), D. Spawforth (Army), T. E. Moronev (Army), R. L. Clark (RN), Hamish Bryce (Army) [captain], M. G. Molloy (Army), L. C. P. Merrick (RN), A. D. H. Turner (RAF), A. J. Hoon (Army), C. A. Farr (RAF)
