= 1971 Scotland versus England rugby union match =

Rugby union match

Rugby Union Centenary International
1971 Scotland versus England rugby union match
| Scotland | England |
| (Scotland) | (England) |
| 26 | 6 |
- Match details
- Date: 27 March 1971; 53 years ago
- Venue: Murrayfield Stadium, Edinburgh
- Referee: Meirion Joseph (Wales)
- Attendance: 50,000

The 1971 Scotland versus England rugby union match, also known as the Rugby Union Centenary International, was an international rugby union match played between Scotland and England on 27 March 1971, the centenary of the match between the two teams played in 1871.

== Overview and background ==
The teams' pre-match record
| Team | Wins |
|---|---|
| England | 41 |
| Scotland | 31 |
| Draws | 14 |

The match between Scotland and England on 27 March 1971 was played one week after their Five Nations meeting. The record of both teams at the Five Nations tournament was poor: Scotland finishing last, England second-last. The two teams were separated by just one-point, both on the final standings and in their Five Nations fixture. The Scots came back to win the encounter 15–16, breaking their six-year, two-match losing streak at Twickenham Stadium.

With the previous weeks result, the competition between both teams was considered very tight. Despite both teams' poor records in the Five Nations, it was notably mentioned as unworthy by the news-media.

Scotland ran away with a dominant victory at home, 26–6. The twenty-point win was Scotland's biggest victory over England, and remained so for 14 years and 325 days until they met in the 1986 Five Nations.

== Match details ==
27 March 1971
13:00 GMT (UTC+0)

| Scotland | 26–6 | England |
| Try: Frame (2) 1' c, 55' c P. Brown 32' m Steele 71' c Rea 75' c Con: A. Brown (4/4) 1', 55', 71', 75'; Pen: P. Brown (1/1) 7' | Report | Pen: Hiller (1/1) 70'; Drop: Cowman (1/1) 10' |

Murrayfield Stadium, Edinburgh
Attendance: 50,000
Referee: Meirion Joseph (Wales)

Scotland
England

| FB | 15 | Arthur Brown |
| RW | 14 | Billy Steele |
| OC | 13 | John Frame |
| IC | 12 | Chris Rea |
| LW | 11 | Alastair Biggar |
| FH | 10 | Jock Turner |
| SH | 9 | Duncan Paterson |
| N8 | 8 | Peter Brown (c) |
| OF | 7 | Rodger Arneil |
| BF | 6 | Nairn MacEwan |
| RL | 5 | Gordon Brown |
| LL | 4 | Alastair McHarg |
| TP | 3 | Sandy Carmichael |
| HK | 2 | Quintin Dunlop |
| LP | 1 | Ian McLauchlan |
Substitutes:
| N8 | 16 | Gordon Strachan |
| WG | 17 | Ronnie Hannah |
| CE | 18 | Stephen Turk |
| SH | 19 | Ian McCrae |
| HK | 20 | Bobby Clark |
| PR | 21 | Hamish Bryce |
Coach:
Bill Dickinson

| FB | 15 | Bob Hiller |
| RW | 14 | Jeremy Janion |
| OC | 13 | Chris Wardlow |
| IC | 12 | John Spencer (c) |
| LW | 11 | David Duckham |
| FH | 10 | Dick Cowman |
| SH | 9 | Nigel Starmer-Smith |
| N8 | 8 | Bob Taylor |
| OF | 7 | Tony Neary |
| BF | 6 | Tony Bucknall |
| RL | 5 | Chris Ralston |
| LL | 4 | Peter Larter |
| TP | 3 | Fran Cotton |
| HK | 2 | John Pullin |
| LP | 1 | Piggy Powell |
Substitutes:
| WG | 16 | Peter Glover |
| SH | 17 | Jacko Page |
| HK | 18 | Andy Johnson |
| PR | 19 | Stack Stevens |
| N8 | 20 | Charlie Hannaford |
| FH | 21 | Ian Wright |
Coach:
Don White
