= 1969 Scotland rugby union tour of Argentina =

Summary
P	W	D	L
Total
6	5	0	1
Test match
2	1	0	1
Opponent
P	W	D	L
Argentina
2	1	0	1

The 1969 Scotland rugby union tour of Argentina was a series of matches played during the month of September 1969 by Scotland in Argentina. It was also the first tour of a Scottish national side to Argentina.

Despite the fact that originally Scottish Rugby Union did not consider this series as official including test matches, it was a real tour of Scottish national side. At the time, it was usual for the Scottish Rugby Union to consider official only the match played against the other teams that play Five Nations, Australia, South Africa and New Zealand. Scotland, after a loss in the first test match, won the second to draw the series.

In 2023, the SRU retrospectively announced that both matches against Argentina were considered as full test matches. This meant that players capped in this tour were retrospectively given full senior caps. The players now capped as full senior internationalists were Ian Murchie and Arthur Orr from the first test match, and Bruce Laidlaw from the second test match.

== Match summary ==
Complete list of matches played by Scotland in Argentina:

Test matches

Date	Opponent	Location	Venue	Score
7 Sep	Argentina C (Note: Third Argentine national team)	Buenos Aires	Gimnasia y Esgrima	19–9
10 Sep	Seleccionado Interior (Note: Combined team formed by players outside Buenos Aires Provinces)	Buenos Aires	Gimnasia y Esgrima	11–3
13 Sep	Argentina	Buenos Aires	Gimnasia y Esgrima	3–20
18 Sep	Rosario RU	Rosario	Plaza Jewell	20–6
21 Sep	Argentina B	Buenos Aires	Gimnasia y Esgrima	9–5
27 Sep	Argentina	Buenos Aires	Gimnasia y Esgrima	6–3

Pld	W	D	L	PF	PA
6	5	0	1	68	46

== Match details ==
7 September 1969

Argentina C	9–19	Scotland
Pen: Cutler 2 Drop: Cutler		Try: Murchie 2, Robertson; Carmichael, Smith; Con: Blaikie 2

Gimnasia y Esgrima, Buenos Aires
Referee: Eduardo Niño (Argentina)

Argentina C': A. Pagano (cap.); J. Fiordalisi, G. Pimentel, R. Spagnol, V. Dobarro; F. Forrester, M. Cutler; C. Bori, N. Carbone, J. Borghi; R. Sellarés, R. Castro; H. Incola, J. Dumas, A. Orzábal.
Scotland XV: C. Blaikie; Mike Smith, C. Rea, I. Murchie, A. Gill; I. Robertson, D. Paterson; J. Telfer (cap.), R. Arneil, W. Lauder; G. Broen, P. Stagg; A. Carmichael, F. Laidlaw, J. Mc Lauchlin.

10 September 1969

Seleccionado Interior	3–11	Scotland
Pen: Vera		Try: Orr, Murchie; Con: Blaikie; Pen: Blaikie

Gimnasia y Esgrima, Buenos Aires
Referee: Bruno Bertelli (Argentina)

Seleccionado del Interior: A. Rodríguez; O. Oelschagler, R. Tarquini, J. Vera, C. Antoraz; C. Navesi, L. Chacón, E. Vaca Narvaja, J. Ghiringhelli, J. Constante; R. Campra (cap.), M. Senatore; R. Fariello, J. Fradua, G. Ribeca.
Scotland XV: C. Blaikie; Mike Smith, A. Orr, I. Murchie, W. Steele, B. Laidlaw, J. Ellis; R. Arneil, J. Telfer (cap.), S. Carmichaci; A. Mc Rarg, P. Stagg; J. Mc Lauchlin, D. Deans, N. Suddon.

13 September 1969

Argentina	20–3	Scotland
Try: Travaglini 2, Miguens; Con: Harris-Smith; Pen: Harris-Smith; Drop: Harris-Smith 2	Report	Try: Smith

Gimnasia y Esgrima, Buenos Aires
Referee: Ricardo Colombo (Argentina)

Argentina	Scotland

Argentina: 15. Dudley Morgan, 14. Marcelo Pascual, 13. Alejandro Travaglini, 12. Arturo Rodriguez Jurado, 11. Mario Walther, 10. Tomas Harris-Smith, 9. Adolfo Etchegaray, 8. Raul Loyola, 7. Hector Silva, 6. Hugo Miguens, 5. Adrian Barone, 4. Aitor Otano (cap), 3. Luis Garcia Yanez, 2. Ricardo Handley, 1. Marcelo Farina
Scotland: 15. Colin Blaikie, 14. Mike Smith, 13. Ian Murchie, 12. A. V. Orr, 11. Drew Gill, 10. Ian Robertson, 9. Duncan Paterson, 8. Jim Telfer (cap.), 7. Wilson Lauder, 6. Rodger Arneil, 5. Alastair McHarg, 4. Peter Stagg, 3. Sandy Carmichael, 2. Frank Laidlaw, 1. Ian McLauchlan

18 September 1969

Rosario RU	6–20	Scotland
Pen: R. Seaton, J. Seaton		Try: Orr, Steele, Paterson; Con: Blaikie; Pen: Blaikie

Plaza Jewell, Rosario
Referee: Carlos Tozzi (Argentina)

Rosario RU: J. Seaton; E. España, J. Beni, C. Blanco, A. Quetglas; R. Villavicencio, O. Aletta; J. Imhoff, M. Chesta, J. L. Imhoff; R. Suárez, H. Suárez; F. Lando, R. Seaton, S. Furno.
Scotland: C. Blaikie; E. Steele, Mike Smith, J. Ellis, A. Orr; B. Laidlaw, D. Paterson; R. Arneil, J. Telfer, W. Lauder; G. Brown, A. Moharg; J. Mc Laughlam, D. Deans, N. Suddon.

21 September 1969

Argentina B	5–9	Scotland
Try: Martínez; Con: Seaton		Try: F. Laidlaw, Lauder; Pen: Blaikie

Gimnasia y Esgrima, Buenos Aires
Referee: Eduardo Niño (Argentina)

Argentina B: J. Seaton; N. Pérez, C. Blanco, J. Benzi, J. Otaola; C. Martínez, L. Gradin (cap.); H. Silveyra, M. Chesta, G. Anderson; R. Suárez, L. Varela; R. Casabal, C. Massabó, A. Abella.
Scotland XV: C. Blaikie; W. Steele, B. Laidlaw, C. Rea, A. Gill; W. Mac Donald, D. Paterson; R. Arneil (cap.), A. Carmichael, W. Lauder, A. Mc Harg, P. Stagg; J. Mc Lauchlan, F. Laidlaw, N. Suddon

27 September 1969

Argentina	3–6	Scotland
Try: Otano		Try: Carmichael; Con: Blaikie

Gimnasia y Esgrima, Buenos Aires
Referee: Carlos Tozzi (Argentina)

Argentina	Scotland

Argentina: 15. Dudley Morgan, 14. Marcelo Pascual, 13. Alejandro Travaglini, 12. Juan Benzi, 11. Mario Walther, 10. Tomas Harris-Smith, 9. Adolfo Etchegaray, 8. Raul Loyola, 7. Hector Silva, 6. Hugo Miguens, 5. Adrian Barone, 4. Aitor Otano, 3. Luis Garcia Yanez, 2. Ricardo Handley, 1. Marcelo Farina
Scotland: 15. Colin Blaikie, 14. Mike Smith, 13. B. Laidlaw, 12. Chris Rea, 11. Billy Steele, 10. Ian Robertson, 9. Duncan Paterson, 8. Jim Telfer, 7. Wilson Lauder, 6. Rodger Arneil, 5. Alastair McHarg, 4. Peter Stagg, 3. Sandy Carmichael, 2. Frank Laidlaw, 1. Ian McLauchlan
