= John Taylor (rugby union, born 1945) =

British Lions & Wales international rugby union footballer

- Born: John Taylor; 21 July 1945 (age 81) Watford, England
- School: Watford Grammar School for Boys

Rugby union career
- Position: Flanker
Amateur team(s)
Years	Team	Apps	(Points)
- Loughborough Colleges
–	London Welsh RFC		
–	London Counties		
–	Surrey		
International career
Years	Team	Apps	(Points)
1967–1973	Wales	26	(25)
1968–1971	British Lions	4	(0)

John Taylor (born 21 July 1945) is a Welsh former rugby union player and current commentator. Nicknamed "Basil Brush" thanks to his wild hair and beard, he was born in Watford, Hertfordshire, and played as a flanker for London Welsh (he later became co-president with former teammate, John Dawes), and represented Wales 26 times between 1967 and 1973.

== Rugby career ==
=== Playing ===
Perhaps Taylor's most famous moment was in the Five Nations match against Scotland in 1971. The match had see-sawed backwards and forwards with each team taking the lead several times. With a few minutes to go and the score at 18–14, Wales won a line-out on the Scotland 22 metre line. The ball moved through the backs to Gerald Davies who managed to squeeze in to score a try at the right hand corner. The Scottish defence kept up the chase to prevent Davies from touching down near the posts. With the score at 18-17 and ball to be placed on the right hand side, the conversion looked almost impossible, particularly as Barry John, the usual Welsh kicker, had been concussed earlier in the match. Instead, Taylor took the conversion attempt and kicked the ball perfectly between the posts. The final score was 19–18, giving Wales the victory. One Welsh journalist called this "the greatest conversion since Saint Paul".

John Taylor played for the British and Irish Lions on the 1968 tour of South Africa and the 1971 tour to New Zealand, in which he played in all 4 Tests.

=== Apartheid ===
He was notable for the stand he took against apartheid after visiting South Africa in 1968, after being selected for the 1968 British Lions tour to South Africa. Taylor was invited on the subsequent 1974 Lions tour to that country but made it clear he would follow his conscience and he refused to tour. He also refused to play against the South Africans during their 1969-1970 Tour of Britain and Ireland. It was Taylor's refusal to face the South Africans for Wales in 1970 that cost him a place with the Barbarians. After Mervyn Davies fell ill before the classic 1973 Barbarian encounter against the All Blacks, Taylor's name was suggested as a replacement. It is alleged that the club secretary for the Barbarians, Brigadier Glyn Hughes, responded negatively to the idea with the response "He's not playing. The man's a Communist!"

=== Activities after retiring ===
Since 1991, he has been the lead rugby commentator on ITV Sport, describing the World Cup final victory of England over Australia on 22 November 2003. He retired from ITV after the 2007 Rugby World Cup and commentated for talkSPORT on the 2011 Rugby World Cup in New Zealand.

Throughout the 2015 Rugby World Cup, hosted by England in September and October but also including games at Cardiff's Millennium Stadium in Wales, Taylor was the stadium announcer for matches played at Twickenham Stadium, London. He worked at every RWC through to 2015 and has worked on every Lions Tour since 1983.
