= Rugby Special =

British rugby programme

Rugby Special is the main rugby union highlights programme on the BBC. The show ran from 1966 and past presenters included David Vine, Keith Macklin, Cliff Morgan, Chris Rea, Nigel Starmer-Smith, Bill Beaumont and John Inverdale. The main commentators were Bill McLaren, Cliff Morgan, Nigel Starmer-Smith, David Parry-Jones, Martyn Huw Williams, Lynn Davies, Jim Neilly and Eddie Butler.

== History ==
For more than thirty years, the programme broadcast highlights of several rugby union matches played that weekend. Broadcast at the weekend on BBC2, it moved between Saturdays and Sundays until the 1988-89 season when it settled into a Sunday early-evening slot.

From the start of the 1994/95 season, the programme was contracted out to an independent production company Chrysalis after 28 years as an in-house BBC production. John Inverdale replaced Chris Rea as host at this time.

The programme ended its original run in 1997 after losing the rights to cover English domestic games, then known as the Allied Dunbar Premiership, to Channel 5, who showed highlights on a programme titled Rugby Express. After one season, the rights to the English Premiership again moved to Channel 4 who showed highlights on Saturday mornings in a programme titled Inside Rugby.

The programme returned on late Thursday nights in 2002 but was discontinued in 2005, when it was a highlights programme of Autumn internationals and Six Nations with studio guests and an audience of fans from the Six Nations. But when the Premiership highlights rights were regained from the 2001–02 season highlights were shown on Sunday Grandstand.

Rugby Special returned to the BBC on 7 February 2016, covering the highlights of Six Nations. The programme returned in 2023 again covering highlights of the Six Nations.

=== Scheduling ===
- 1966–1976, 1980–1981, 1984–1985: Saturday nights
- 1976–1980, 1981–1984, 1985–1988: Sunday afternoons
- 1988–1997: Sunday early evenings
- 2002–2005: Thursday late nights

== Regional opt out versions ==
From the 1986–87 season, BBC2 Wales, BBC2 Scotland and BBC Two Northern Ireland started their own regional versions. These programmes went out at the same time as the main version broadcast in England from London. The BBC2 England version would still show one or two club games from Wales and Scotland as a second or third match.

=== Wales ===
Previously, Wales Rugby Union highlights had been broadcast on BBC1 Wales on Sunday Afternoons under the Sports Line-Up title, and later as Weekend Rugby Union with David Parry-Jones as presenter and commentator. He would carry on as presenter when Martyn Williams took over the commentator role with Phil Bennett as co-commentator. When the Rugby Union highlights moved to BBC2 Wales, it became known as Rugby Special Wales with David Parry-Jones and Martyn Williams continuing in the roles in the first season. For 1987/88, Alan Wilkins became the presenter though he would also deputise as a commentator when Martyn Williams wasn't available with Martyn Williams as the main commentator and Phil Bennett in the commentary box until the end of the 1988–89 season. Lynn Davies took over as commentator from the 1989–90 season and carried on until 1995, again with Phil Bennett as co-commentator when it would become Scrum V where he would continue as commentator until 1998 when Huw Llywelyn Davies would take over the English Language commentator role for a short time before returning to his Welsh Language commentator role on S4C. (though from 1997-2001 BBC retained the Wales internationals both Autumn and Five/Six Nations rights in both English (for BBC1 and 2 on both UK network and regional Wales only) and Welsh (for S4C) while the English language domestic rights were lost to the Wales ITV franchise HTV with S4C retaining Welsh language rights BBC Wales under it's Welsh language brand BBC Cymru would contine to produce the coverage for S4C) in 2001 when the Celtic League now United Rugby Championship came BBC Cymru/Wales got the rights to cover the Welsh regions in English on BBC Wales and Welsh on S4C.

=== Scotland ===
The Scottish programme went out as Rugby Special from Scotland with Bill Johnstone presenting in the late 1980s until the mid-1990s, when the programme was now aired under the Sportscene banner as Sportscene Rugby Special and at this point the presenters was Mark Souster until he was replaced by Jill Douglas in the late 1990s and in the programme's final year, former rugby player John Beattie took over hosting duties with Gary Parker co-hosting with John around the early 2000s. The commentator for all live matches and highlights was Bill McLaren.

=== Northern Ireland ===
The Northern Ireland version mostly covered matches involving Ulster Rugby and was a co-production with RTÉ due to the fact that Rugby Union in Ireland is governed on a United Ireland basis under the Irish Rugby Football Union banner. The commentators were Jim Neilly and Fergus Slattery.

== Theme music ==
In the early seventies, the theme tune was "Spinball" by Paddy Kingsland but this was later replaced by "Holy Mackerel" by The Shadows' drummer, Brian Bennett which was replaced for one season 1988–89 by the Kenny G version of "What Does It Take (To Win Your Love)" from the 1986 Duotones album replaced from 1989–90 to 1993–94 by a specially commissioned theme.
