= Ronnie Hannah =

- Full name: Ronald Scott Murray Hannah
- Born: 15 December 1945 (age 80)

Rugby union career
- Position: Wing
International career
Years	Team	Apps	(Points)
1971	Scotland	1	(0)

Ronald Scott Murray Hannah (born 15 December 1945) is a Scottish former rugby union international.

A West of Scotland winger, Hannah was capped once for Scotland in the 1971 Five Nations. He received a call the day before the match against Ireland at Murrayfield after Chris Rea had to withdraw with injury. One week later, he was on the bench as Scotland met England again, for the Centenary match. He was a Glasgow District representative player.

Hannah used to run the food wholesale business J W Filshill.

== See also ==
- List of Scotland national rugby union players
