= Gordon Macdonald (rugby union) =

Scotland international rugby union player

- Full name: William Gordon Macdonald
- Born: 30 December 1938 Glasgow, Scotland
- Died: 28 June 2012 (aged 73)

Rugby union career
- Position: Centre / Fullback
International career
Years	Team	Apps	(Points)
1969	Scotland	1	(0)

William Gordon Macdonald (30 December 1938 — 28 June 2012) was a Scottish international rugby union player.

Born in Glasgow, Macdonald was educated at Belmont House School and Oundle School. The company his father founded, Macdonald's Biscuits, created and manufactured Penguin biscuits.

Macdonald played his rugby for London Scottish, which he captained to an unbeaten season in 1968–69. He was a Scotland international player in 1969, gaining his solitary cap off the bench against Ireland at Murrayfield, as a replacement for injured centre Chris Rea. His time on the field was limited to 99 seconds and he neither got to touch the ball or produce a tackle. This was followed by a place on Scotland's end-of-season tour of Argentina, which didn't include capped matches. He also represented Middlesex and later served as selector for the county.

== See also ==
- List of Scotland national rugby union players
