= Quintin Dunlop =

- Born: 9 March 1943 (age 83) Ayr, Scotland

Rugby union career
- Position: Hooker
International career
Years	Team	Apps	(Points)
1971	Scotland	2	(0)

Quintin Dunlop (born 9 March 1943) is a Scottish former rugby union international.

Born in Ayr, Dunlop was educated at Merchiston Castle School.

Dunlop, a hooker, captained Ayr and West of Scotland during his career.

Capped twice for Scotland, Dunlop gained both his caps against England in 1971. He debuted in the Five Nations fixture at Twickenham, then played in the Centenary match a week later at Murrayfield, with Scotland winning each time. This gives him the unusual distinction of beating England twice in a week long Test career.

Dunlop, a farmer by profession, founded free-range egg business Scotlay Eggs.

== See also ==
- List of Scotland national rugby union players
