= Souster =

Souster is a surname. Notable people with the surname include:

- Mark Souster (born 1958), English journalist and broadcaster
- Raymond Souster (1921–2012), Canadian poet
- Tim Souster (1943–1994), British composer and writer on music
