= History of rugby union matches between England and Scotland =

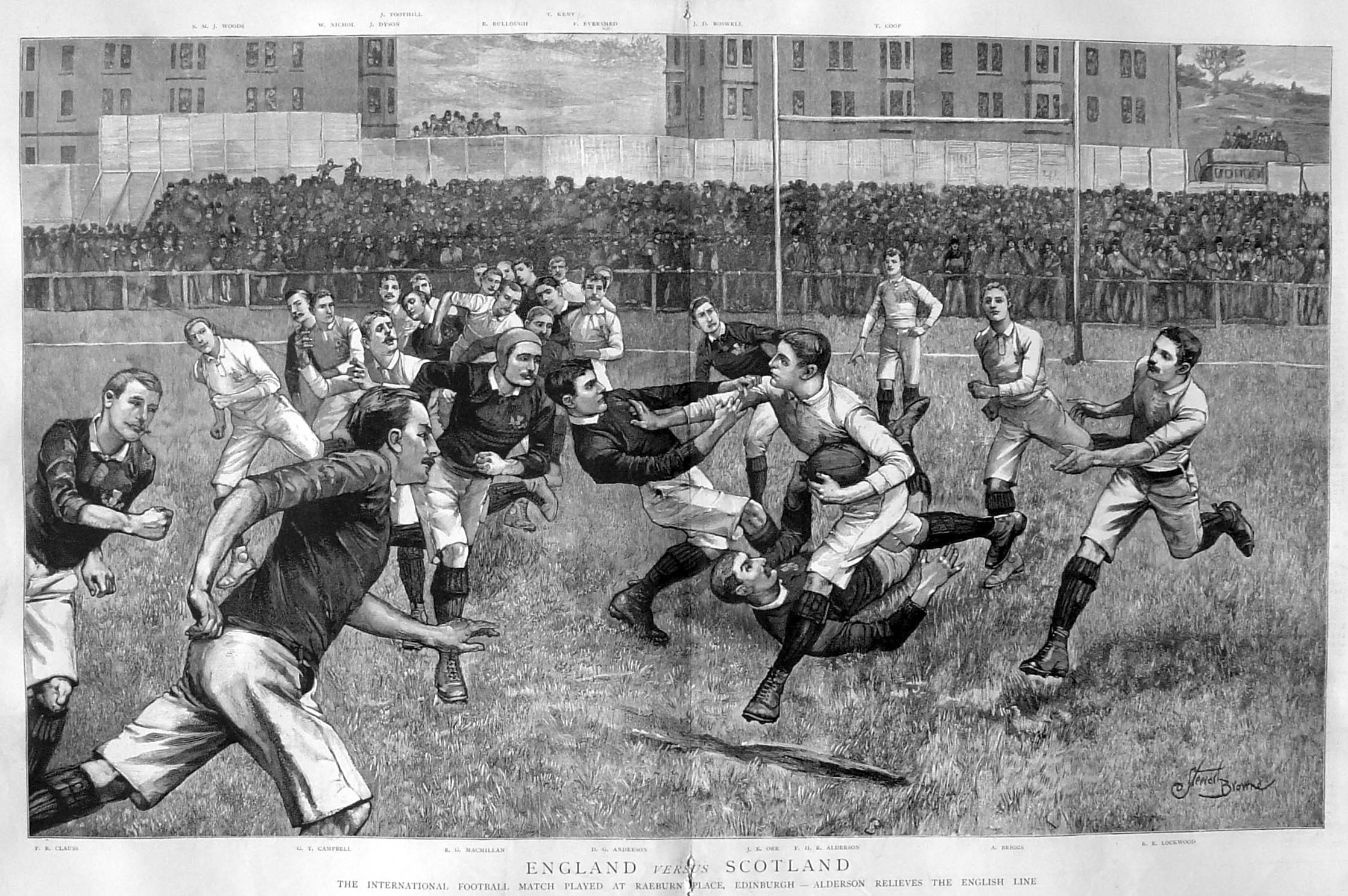
Illustration of the Scotland v England match at Raeburn Place in 1892.

England and Scotland have been playing each other at rugby union since 1871 when Scotland beat England in the first ever rugby union international. A total of 144 matches have been played, with England having won 77 times, Scotland 48 times and nineteen matches have been drawn.

Apart from fixtures played in the Home/Five/Six Nations Championship competitions, two games have been played at the Rugby World Cup: the 1991 Semi-final and the 2011 Pool B fixture, both of which England were victorious. The sides also met in 1971 in a match to commemorate the centenary of the first match between the sides, which Scotland were victorious in both fixtures.

The 1938 Calcutta Cup match was the first live televised rugby international. It was broadcast by BBC Television.

The first two international sides to play against each other, the England–Scotland fixture is the second most-played international rugby union match as of 2025. Behind the Australia–New Zealand rivalry by some thirty-plus matches (not including XV results), it is one match ahead of the England–Ireland match-up and the Ireland–Scotland match-up.

== Calcutta Cup ==
The teams have consistently been competing for the Calcutta Cup annually since 1879, or their ninth match-up together. Used in a one-off match, the Cup first took part in the Home Nations friendlies of the 1870s and early '80s. It is now one trophy of many used between the six teams that make up the Six Nations Championship.

== Summary ==
Note: Summary below reflects test results by both teams.

=== Overall ===
Details	Played	Won by England	Won by Scotland	Drawn	England points	Scotland points
In England	70	46	16	8	1,027	636
In Scotland	72	30	32	11	727	688
Neutral venue	1	1	0	0	16	12
Overall	144	77	48	19	1,790	1,367

=== Records ===
Note: Date shown in brackets indicates when the record was last set.

Record	England	Scotland
Longest winning streak	10 (16 February 1991 – 2 April 2000)	4 (4 March 1893 – 13 March 1897; 21 February 1970 – 17 March 1973; 6 February 2021 – 22 February 2025)
Largest points for
Home	61 (11 March 2017)	33 (15 February 1986)
Away	35 (21 February 2004)	38 (16 March 2019)
Largest winning margin
Home	40 (3 March 2001; 11 March 2017)	27 (15 February 1986)
Away	26 (2 February 2002)	15 (9 March 1901)

== Results ==
No.	Date	Venue	Score	Winner	Competition
1	27 March 1871	Raeburn Place, Edinburgh	(2T) 1G–0G (1T)	Scotland	1871 Scotland v England International
2	5 February 1872	The Oval, London	(3T) 2G–1G (0)	England	1871–72 Home Nations International
3	3 March 1873	West of Scotland F.C., Glasgow	(0) 0G–0G (0)	draw	1872–73 Home Nations International
4	23 February 1874	The Oval, London	(0) 1G–0G (1T)	England	1873–74 Home Nations International
5	8 March 1875	Raeburn Place, Edinburgh	(0) 0G–0G (0)	draw	1874–75 Home Nations International
6	6 March 1876	The Oval, London	(2T) 1G–0G (0)	England	1875–76 Home Nations International
7	5 March 1877	Raeburn Place, Edinburgh	(0) 1G–0G (0)	Scotland	1876–77 Home Nations International
8	4 March 1878	The Oval, London	(0) 0G–0G (0)	draw	1877–78 Home Nations International
9	10 March 1879	Raeburn Place, Edinburgh	(0) 1G–1G (1T)	draw	1878–79 Home Nations International
10	28 February 1880	Whalley Range, Manchester	(5T) 2G–1G (1T)	England	1879–80 Home Nations International
11	19 March 1881	Raeburn Place, Edinburgh	(2T) 1G–1G (1T)	draw	1880–81 Home Nations International
12	4 March 1882	Whalley Range, Manchester	(0) 0G–0G (2T)	Scotland	1881–82 Home Nations International
13	3 March 1883	Raeburn Place, Edinburgh	(1T) 0G–0G (2T)	England	1883 Home Nations Championship
14	1 March 1884	Rectory Field, Blackheath	(1T) 1G–0G (1T)	England	1884 Home Nations Championship
15	13 March 1886	Raeburn Place, Edinburgh	(0) 0G–0G (0)	draw	1886 Home Nations Championship
16	5 March 1887	Whalley Range, Manchester	(1T) 0G–0G (1T)	draw	1887 Home Nations Championship
17	1 March 1890	Raeburn Place, Edinburgh	0–6	England	1890 Home Nations Championship
18	7 March 1891	Athletic Ground, Richmond	3–9	Scotland	1891 Home Nations Championship
19	6 March 1892	Raeburn Place, Edinburgh	0–5	England	1892 Home Nations Championship
20	4 March 1893	Headingley, Leeds	0–8	Scotland	1893 Home Nations Championship
21	17 March 1894	Raeburn Place, Edinburgh	6–0	Scotland	1894 Home Nations Championship
22	9 March 1895	Athletic Ground, Richmond	3–6	Scotland	1895 Home Nations Championship
23	14 March 1896	Hampden Park, Glasgow	11–0	Scotland	1896 Home Nations Championship
24	13 March 1897	Fallowfield, Manchester	12–3	England	1897 Home Nations Championship
25	12 March 1898	Powderhall, Edinburgh	3–3	draw	1898 Home Nations Championship
26	11 March 1899	Rectory Field, Blackheath	0–5	Scotland	1899 Home Nations Championship
27	10 March 1900	Inverleith, Edinburgh	0–0	draw	1900 Home Nations Championship
28	9 March 1901	Rectory Field, Blackheath	3–18	Scotland	1901 Home Nations Championship
29	15 March 1902	Inverleith, Edinburgh	3–6	England	1902 Home Nations Championship
30	21 March 1903	Athletic Ground, Richmond	6–10	Scotland	1903 Home Nations Championship
31	19 March 1904	Inverleith, Edinburgh	6–3	Scotland	1904 Home Nations Championship
32	18 March 1905	Athletic Ground, Richmond	0–8	Scotland	1905 Home Nations Championship
33	17 March 1906	Inverleith, Edinburgh	3–9	England	1906 Home Nations Championship
34	16 March 1907	Rectory Field, Blackheath	3–8	Scotland	1907 Home Nations Championship
35	21 March 1908	Inverleith, Edinburgh	16–10	Scotland	1908 Home Nations Championship
36	20 March 1909	Athletic Ground, Richmond	8–18	Scotland	1909 Home Nations Championship
37	19 March 1910	Inverleith, Edinburgh	5–14	England	1910 Five Nations Championship
38	18 March 1911	Twickenham Stadium, London	13–8	England	1911 Five Nations Championship
39	16 March 1912	Inverleith, Edinburgh	8–3	Scotland	1912 Five Nations Championship
40	15 March 1913	Twickenham Stadium, London	3–0	England	1913 Five Nations Championship
41	21 March 1914	Inverleith, Edinburgh	15–16	England	1914 Five Nations Championship
42	20 March 1920	Twickenham Stadium, London	13–4	England	1920 Five Nations Championship
43	19 March 1921	Inverleith, Edinburgh	0–18	England	1921 Five Nations Championship
44	18 March 1922	Twickenham Stadium, London	11–5	England	1922 Five Nations Championship
45	17 March 1923	Inverleith, Edinburgh	6–8	England	1923 Five Nations Championship
46	15 March 1924	Twickenham Stadium, London	19–0	England	1924 Five Nations Championship
47	21 March 1925	Murrayfield Stadium, Edinburgh	14–11	Scotland	1925 Five Nations Championship
48	20 March 1926	Twickenham Stadium, London	9–17	Scotland	1926 Five Nations Championship
49	19 March 1927	Murrayfield Stadium, Edinburgh	21–13	Scotland	1927 Five Nations Championship
50	17 March 1928	Twickenham Stadium, London	6–0	England	1928 Five Nations Championship
51	16 March 1929	Murrayfield Stadium, Edinburgh	12–6	Scotland	1929 Five Nations Championship
52	15 March 1930	Twickenham Stadium, London	0–0	draw	1930 Five Nations Championship
53	21 March 1931	Murrayfield Stadium, Edinburgh	28–19	Scotland	1931 Five Nations Championship
54	19 March 1932	Twickenham Stadium, London	16–3	England	1932 Home Nations Championship
55	18 March 1933	Murrayfield Stadium, Edinburgh	3–0	Scotland	1933 Home Nations Championship
56	17 March 1934	Twickenham Stadium, London	6–3	England	1934 Home Nations Championship
57	16 March 1935	Murrayfield Stadium, Edinburgh	10–7	Scotland	1935 Home Nations Championship
58	21 March 1936	Twickenham Stadium, London	9–8	England	1936 Home Nations Championship
59	20 March 1937	Murrayfield Stadium, Edinburgh	3–6	England	1937 Home Nations Championship
60	19 March 1938	Twickenham Stadium, London	16–21	Scotland	1938 Home Nations Championship
61	18 March 1939	Murrayfield Stadium, Edinburgh	6–9	England	1939 Home Nations Championship
62	15 March 1947	Twickenham Stadium, London	24–5	England	1947 Five Nations Championship
63	20 March 1948	Murrayfield Stadium, Edinburgh	6–3	Scotland	1948 Five Nations Championship
64	19 March 1949	Twickenham Stadium, London	19–3	England	1949 Five Nations Championship
65	18 March 1950	Murrayfield Stadium, Edinburgh	13–11	Scotland	1950 Five Nations Championship
66	17 March 1951	Twickenham Stadium, London	5–3	England	1951 Five Nations Championship
67	15 March 1952	Murrayfield Stadium, Edinburgh	3–19	England	1952 Five Nations Championship
68	21 March 1953	Twickenham Stadium, London	26–8	England	1953 Five Nations Championship
69	20 March 1954	Murrayfield Stadium, Edinburgh	3–13	England	1954 Five Nations Championship
70	19 March 1955	Twickenham Stadium, London	9–6	England	1955 Five Nations Championship
71	17 March 1956	Murrayfield Stadium, Edinburgh	6–11	England	1956 Five Nations Championship
72	16 March 1957	Twickenham Stadium, London	16–3	England	1957 Five Nations Championship
73	15 March 1958	Murrayfield Stadium, Edinburgh	3–3	draw	1958 Five Nations Championship
74	21 March 1959	Twickenham Stadium, London	3–3	draw	1959 Five Nations Championship
75	19 March 1960	Murrayfield Stadium, Edinburgh	12–21	England	1960 Five Nations Championship
76	18 March 1961	Twickenham Stadium, London	6–0	England	1961 Five Nations Championship
77	17 March 1962	Murrayfield Stadium, Edinburgh	3–3	draw	1962 Five Nations Championship
78	16 March 1963	Twickenham Stadium, London	10–8	England	1963 Five Nations Championship
79	21 March 1964	Murrayfield Stadium, Edinburgh	15–6	Scotland	1964 Five Nations Championship
80	20 March 1965	Twickenham Stadium, London	3–3	draw	1965 Five Nations Championship
81	19 March 1966	Murrayfield Stadium, Edinburgh	6–3	Scotland	1966 Five Nations Championship
82	18 March 1967	Twickenham Stadium, London	27–14	England	1967 Five Nations Championship
83	16 March 1968	Murrayfield Stadium, Edinburgh	6–8	England	1968 Five Nations Championship
84	15 March 1969	Twickenham Stadium, London	8–3	England	1969 Five Nations Championship
85	21 February 1970	Murrayfield Stadium, Edinburgh	14–5	Scotland	1970 Five Nations Championship
86	20 March 1971	Twickenham Stadium, London	15–16	Scotland	1971 Five Nations Championship
87	27 March 1971	Murrayfield Stadium, Edinburgh	26–6	Scotland	Rugby Union Centenary International
88	18 March 1972	Murrayfield Stadium, Edinburgh	23–9	Scotland	1972 Five Nations Championship
89	17 March 1973	Twickenham Stadium, London	20–13	England	1973 Five Nations Championship
90	2 February 1974	Murrayfield Stadium, Edinburgh	16–14	Scotland	1974 Five Nations Championship
91	15 March 1975	Twickenham Stadium, London	7–6	England	1975 Five Nations Championship
92	21 February 1976	Murrayfield Stadium, Edinburgh	22–12	Scotland	1976 Five Nations Championship
93	15 January 1977	Twickenham Stadium, London	26–6	England	1977 Five Nations Championship
94	4 March 1978	Murrayfield Stadium, Edinburgh	0–15	England	1978 Five Nations Championship
95	3 February 1979	Twickenham Stadium, London	7–7	draw	1979 Five Nations Championship
96	15 March 1980	Murrayfield Stadium, Edinburgh	18–30	England	1980 Five Nations Championship
97	21 February 1981	Twickenham Stadium, London	23–17	England	1981 Five Nations Championship
98	16 January 1982	Murrayfield Stadium, Edinburgh	9–9	draw	1982 Five Nations Championship
99	5 March 1983	Twickenham Stadium, London	12–22	Scotland	1983 Five Nations Championship
100	4 February 1984	Murrayfield Stadium, Edinburgh	18–6	Scotland	1984 Five Nations Championship
101	16 March 1985	Twickenham Stadium, London	10–7	England	1985 Five Nations Championship
102	15 February 1986	Murrayfield Stadium, Edinburgh	33–6	Scotland	1986 Five Nations Championship
103	4 April 1987	Twickenham Stadium, London	21–12	England	1987 Five Nations Championship
104	5 March 1988	Murrayfield Stadium, Edinburgh	6–9	England	1988 Five Nations Championship
105	4 February 1989	Twickenham Stadium, London	12–12	draw	1989 Five Nations Championship
106	17 March 1990	Murrayfield Stadium, Edinburgh	13–7	Scotland	1990 Five Nations Championship
107	16 February 1991	Twickenham Stadium, London	21–12	England	1991 Five Nations Championship
108	26 October 1991	Murrayfield Stadium, Edinburgh	6–9	England	1991 Rugby World Cup Semi-Final
109	18 January 1992	Murrayfield Stadium, Edinburgh	7–25	England	1992 Five Nations Championship
110	6 March 1993	Twickenham Stadium, London	26–12	England	1993 Five Nations Championship
111	5 February 1994	Murrayfield Stadium, Edinburgh	14–15	England	1994 Five Nations Championship
112	18 March 1995	Twickenham Stadium, London	24–12	England	1995 Five Nations Championship
113	2 March 1996	Murrayfield Stadium, Edinburgh	9–18	England	1996 Five Nations Championship
114	1 February 1997	Twickenham Stadium, London	41–13	England	1997 Five Nations Championship
115	22 March 1998	Murrayfield Stadium, Edinburgh	20–34	England	1998 Five Nations Championship
116	20 February 1999	Twickenham Stadium, London	24–21	England	1999 Five Nations Championship
117	2 April 2000	Murrayfield Stadium, Edinburgh	19–13	Scotland	2000 Six Nations Championship
118	3 March 2001	Twickenham Stadium, London	43–3	England	2001 Six Nations Championship
119	2 February 2002	Murrayfield Stadium, Edinburgh	3–29	England	2002 Six Nations Championship
120	22 March 2003	Twickenham Stadium, London	40–9	England	2003 Six Nations Championship
121	21 February 2004	Murrayfield Stadium, Edinburgh	13–35	England	2004 Six Nations Championship
122	19 March 2005	Twickenham Stadium, London	43–22	England	2005 Six Nations Championship
123	25 February 2006	Murrayfield Stadium, Edinburgh	18–12	Scotland	2006 Six Nations Championship
124	3 February 2007	Twickenham Stadium, London	42–20	England	2007 Six Nations Championship
125	8 March 2008	Murrayfield Stadium, Edinburgh	15–9	Scotland	2008 Six Nations Championship
126	21 March 2009	Twickenham Stadium, London	26–12	England	2009 Six Nations Championship
127	13 March 2010	Murrayfield Stadium, Edinburgh	15–15	draw	2010 Six Nations Championship
128	13 March 2011	Twickenham Stadium, London	22–16	England	2011 Six Nations Championship
129	1 October 2011	Eden Park, Auckland (New Zealand)	16–12	England	2011 Rugby World Cup Pool Match
130	4 February 2012	Murrayfield Stadium, Edinburgh	6–13	England	2012 Six Nations Championship
131	2 February 2013	Twickenham Stadium, London	38–18	England	2013 Six Nations Championship
132	8 February 2014	Murrayfield Stadium, Edinburgh	0–20	England	2014 Six Nations Championship
133	14 March 2015	Twickenham Stadium, London	25–13	England	2015 Six Nations Championship
134	6 February 2016	Murrayfield Stadium, Edinburgh	9–15	England	2016 Six Nations Championship
135	11 March 2017	Twickenham Stadium, London	61–21	England	2017 Six Nations Championship
136	24 February 2018	Murrayfield Stadium, Edinburgh	25–13	Scotland	2018 Six Nations Championship
137	16 March 2019	Twickenham Stadium, London	38–38	draw	2019 Six Nations Championship
138	8 February 2020	Murrayfield Stadium, Edinburgh	6–13	England	2020 Six Nations Championship
139	6 February 2021	Twickenham Stadium, London	6–11	Scotland	2021 Six Nations Championship
140	5 February 2022	Murrayfield Stadium, Edinburgh	20–17	Scotland	2022 Six Nations Championship
141	4 February 2023	Twickenham Stadium, London	23–29	Scotland	2023 Six Nations Championship
142	24 February 2024	Murrayfield Stadium, Edinburgh	30–21	Scotland	2024 Six Nations Championship
143	22 February 2025	Twickenham Stadium, London	16–15	England	2025 Six Nations Championship
144	14 February 2026	Murrayfield Stadium, Edinburgh	31–20	Scotland	2026 Six Nations Championship
