= Chico Hopkins =

Wales international rugby union & league footballer

Ray Hopkins
- Born: Raymond Hopkins; 8 July 1946 (age 80) Maesteg, Wales
- Height: 5 ft 8 in (1.73 m)
- Weight: 12 st 11 lb (179 lb; 81 kg)
- Occupation: fitter

Rugby union career
- Position: Scrum-half
Amateur team(s)
Years	Team	Apps	(Points)
- Maesteg RFC
–	Llanelli RFC		
–	Barbarian F.C.		
International career
Years	Team	Apps	(Points)
1970	Wales	1	(3)
1971	British Isles	1	(0)
- Rugby league career

Playing information
- Position: Scrum-half
Club
Years	Team	Pld	T	G	FG	P
1972–74	Swinton	30	5	0	0	15
1974–75	Halifax	2	0	0	0	0
	Total	32	5	0	0	15

Ray "Chico" Hopkins (born 8 July 1946) is a Welsh former international rugby player who was also a member of the British Lions.

== Background ==
Ray Hopkins was born in the industrial town of Maesteg in Cwm Llynfi - the Llynfi Valley - in the county of Glamorgan in south Wales. Following his education, he worked as a National Coal Board fitter at their workshop in Maesteg.

== Club career ==
Hopkins played youth rugby union for the Maesteg RFC academy. Later, he played for the senior Maesteg team, Wales, British and Irish Lions and Llanelli RFC.

Hopkins played for the victorious Llanelli team that played and beat the New Zealand All Blacks at Stradey Park on 31 October 1972. The Scarlets side emerged 9–3 winners of what was a bruising, brutal encounter at a packed Stradey Park with 20,000 supporters. Others to play in the victory included fellow Cwm Llynfi - Llynfi Valley - legend J.J. Williams; Phil Bennett; future Wales Coach Gareth Jenkins and Ray Gravell.

In 1972 Hopkins joined Swinton RLFC (rugby league), making his debut against Huyton on 3 December that year.

== International career ==
Although he played only 20 minutes for the full international Wales team, Hopkins earned lasting fame in Welsh rugby history due to a notable try against England in 1970. It was unfortunate for him that Gareth Edwards was in possession of the Wales and British Lions scrum-half position at the time.

Hopkins's moment of fame came during the England v. Wales game at Twickenham in 1970. The Wales team were behind on points with twenty minutes to go. The captain, Gareth Edwards, was injured and had to retire from the game. Hopkins came onto the field as a replacement. He soon scored a try, and, after a conversion by J. P. R. Williams, Wales won the game.

He toured with the 1971 Lions to New Zealand and played in ten games against provincial sides. He was an injury replacement for Gareth Edwards in the Dunedin Test match, which the Lions won, 9–3.

Hopkins is part of a long line of Welsh international rugby players from Cwm Llynfi - the Llynfi Valley - including Windsor Major, J.J. Williams, Gwyn Evans and Allan Bateman.
