= Ivan Vodanovich =

New Zealand rugby union player (1930–1995)

Ivan Vodanovich MBE
- Born: Ivan Matthew Henry Vodanovich; 8 April 1928 Whanganui, New Zealand
- Died: 2 September 1995 (aged 65) Wellington, New Zealand
- Height: 1.83 m (6 ft 0 in)
- Weight: 96 kg (212 lb)
- School: Kaitangaweka Primary School
- Occupation: Menswear retailer

Rugby union career
- Position: Prop
International career
Years	Team	Apps	(Points)
1955	New Zealand	3	(3)
Coaching career
- Years: Team
- 1969–71: New Zealand

Ivan Matthew Henry Vodanovich MBE (8 April 1928 – 2 September 1995) was a New Zealand rugby union player, coach and administrator. He played three tests for the All Blacks in 1955. Vodanovich was All Blacks coach from 1969 to 1971.

As then coach and chief selector of the New Zealand team, he gained some notoriety for warning that the first test of the British Lions 1971 tour of New Zealand could be "another Passchendaele" for the Lions if they continued to play negative rugby as they had in a preliminary match against Canterbury. The Lions went on to record a rare series win 2–1.

In the 1992 Queen's Birthday Honours, Vodanovich was appointed a Member of the Order of the British Empire, for services to rugby.

Sporting positions
Preceded by Fred Allen	All Blacks coach 1969—1971	Succeeded by Bob Duff
