= Tom Lister (rugby union) =

- Born: Thomas Norman Lister; 27 October 1943 Ashburton, New Zealand
- Died: 23 July 2017 (aged 73) Timaru, New Zealand
- Height: 1.88 m (6 ft 2 in)
- Weight: 93 kg (205 lb)
- School: Waitaki Boys' High School
- Notable relative: John Lister (brother)

Rugby union career
- Position: Flanker
Amateur team(s)
| Years | Team | Apps | (Points) |
| 1962–64, 1968–74 | High School Old Boys | | |
| 1965–67 | Athletic | | |
Provincial / State sides
| Years | Team | Apps | (Points) |
| 1962–64, 1968–74 | South Canterbury | 38 | (21) |
| 1965–67 | Wellington | 40 | (21) |
International career
| Years | Team | Apps | (Points) |
| 1965–66 | Junior All Blacks | 3 | (3) |
| 1968–71 | New Zealand | 8 | (6) |

Thomas Norman Lister (27 October 1943 − 23 July 2017) was a New Zealand rugby union player who represented the All Blacks between 1968 and 1971. His position of choice was flanker.

== Early life and family ==
Born in Ashburton in 1943, Lister was educated at Temuka Primary School and then Waitaki Boys' High School, where he was a member of the 1st XV in 1960. He was the older brother of professional golfer John Lister.

== Career ==
Lister was selected for South Canterbury in his first year playing senior rugby in 1962.

He moved to Wellington in 1964 to further his chances of making the All Blacks. He linked up with Terry McCashin (who would also become an All Black) to play for Wellington's Athletic club and both worked for a time as rubbish collectors, which helped them become "superbly fit".

He made his debut for the All Blacks on 15 June 1968 against Australia in Sydney. He played in both tests in his first All Black tour, to Australia in 1968. He also played two tests against Wales in 1969 and two more against South Africa in 1970. His final international match was in the fourth test against the 1971 Lions, ending his All Black career with a try. In his All Black career he played a total of 26 games, with eight of them being test matches. He totalled 33 points (11 tries), scoring two tries in test matches.

Lister temporarily retired from first-class rugby in 1972, but returned to represent his province for the next two seasons. He later coached the South Canterbury under-18 side.

== Death ==
Lister died in Timaru on 23 July 2017.
