= 1971 Five Nations Championship =

Rugby Union tournament

- Date: 16 January - 27 March 1971
- Countries: England; Ireland; France; Scotland; Wales

Tournament statistics
- Champions: Wales (17th title)
- Grand Slam: Wales (6th title)
- Triple Crown: Wales (12th title)
- Matches played: 10
- Tries scored: 35 (3.5 per match)
- Top point scorer: (England) Bob Hiller (35)
- Top try scorer: (Wales) Davies (5)

The 1971 Five Nations Championship was the forty-second series of the rugby union Five Nations Championship. Including the previous incarnations as the Home Nations and Five Nations, this was the seventy-seventh series of the northern hemisphere rugby union championship. This was the last Five Nations tournament where a try was worth 3 points. Ten matches were played between 16 January and 27 March. It was contested by England, France, Ireland, Scotland and Wales.

Wales won all their four matches to win the championship for the seventeenth time outright, excluding shared titles. They won the Triple Crown for the second time in three seasons and the twelfth time overall, and completed the Grand Slam for the first time since 1952 and the sixth time overall.

== Participants ==
The teams involved were:

Nation	Venue	City	Head coach	Captain
England	Twickenham	London	Don White	Tony Bucknall/John Spencer
France	Stade Olympique Yves-du-Manoir	Colombes	Fernand Cazenave	Benoît Dauga/Christian Carrère
Ireland	Lansdowne Road	Dublin	Ronnie Dawson	Tom Kiernan/Mike Gibson
Scotland	Murrayfield	Edinburgh	Bill Dickinson	Peter Brown
Wales	National Stadium	Cardiff	Clive Rowlands	John Dawes

== Table ==
Pos	Team	Pld	W	D	L	PF	PA	PD	Pts
1	Wales	4	4	0	0	73	38	+35	8
2	France	4	1	2	1	41	40	+1	4
3	Ireland	4	1	1	2	41	46	−5	3
3	England	4	1	1	2	44	58	−14	3
5	Scotland	4	1	0	3	47	64	−17	2

== Results ==
1971-01-16

France	13–8	Scotland
Tries: Sillières; Villepreux; Con: Villepreux (2); Pen: Villepreux		Tries: Steele; Con: Brown; Pen: Smith

Stade Olympique Yves-du-Manoir, Colombes
Attendance: 32,466
Referee: K. D. Kelleher (Ireland)

1971-01-16

Wales	22–6	England
Tries: Bevan; Davies (2); Con: Taylor (2); Pen: Williams; Drop: John (2)		Tries: Hannaford; Pen: Rossborough

National Stadium, Cardiff
Referee: D. P. d'Arcy (Ireland)

1971-01-30

Ireland	9–9	France
Tries: Grant; Pen: O'Driscoll (2)		Pen: Villepreux (2); Drop: Bérot

Lansdowne Road, Dublin
Attendance: 55,000
Referee: G. C. Lamb (England)

1971-02-06

Scotland	18–19	Wales
Tries: Carmichael; Rea; Pen: Brown (4)		Tries: Taylor; Edwards; John; Davies; Con: John; Taylor; Pen: John

Murrayfield, Edinburgh
Referee: M. H. Titcomb (England)

1971-02-13

Ireland	6–9	England
Tries: Grant; Duggan		Pen: Hiller (3)

Lansdowne Road, Dublin
Referee: M. Joseph (Wales)

1971-02-27

Scotland	5–17	Ireland
Tries: Frame; Con: Brown		Tries: Duggan (2); Grant; Con: Gibson; Pen: Gibson (2)

Murrayfield, Edinburgh
Referee: W. K. M. Jones (Wales)

1971-02-27

England	14–14	France
Tries: Hiller; Con: Hiller; Pen: Hiller (3)		Tries: Bertranne; Cantoni; Con: Villepreux; Pen: Villepreux; Drop: Bérot

Twickenham, London
Attendance: 70,000
Referee: A. R. Lewis (Wales)

1971-03-13

Wales	23–9	Ireland
Tries: Davies (2); Edwards (2); Con: John; Pen: John (2); Drop: John		Pen: Gibson (3)

National Stadium, Cardiff
Referee: R. F. Johnson (England)

1971-03-20

England	15–16	Scotland
Tries: Hiller; Neary; Pen: Hiller (3)		Tries: Brown; Paterson; Rea; Con: Brown (2); Drop: Paterson

Twickenham, London
Referee: C. Durand (France)

1971-03-27

France	5–9	Wales
Tries: Dauga; Con: Villepreux		Tries: Edwards; John; Pen.: John

Stade Olympique Yves-du-Manoir, Colombes
Attendance: 50,703
Referee: J. Young (Scotland)
