= Eddie Grant (rugby union) =

Rugby union player from Northern Ireland

- Full name: Edwin Leslie Grant
- Born: 13 April 1946 (age 80) Belfast, Northern Ireland

Rugby union career
- Position: Wing
International career
Years	Team	Apps	(Points)
1971	Ireland	4	(9)

Edwin Leslie Grant (born 13 April 1946) is a former Ireland rugby union international from Northern Ireland.

Grant was born and raised in Belfast, attending Belfast High School.

A winger, Grant played for Belfast's CIYMS club and had yet to represent Ulster when he broke into the Ireland team for the 1971 Five Nations. He played in all of Ireland's Five Nations matches that year and scored three tries, including a memorable intercept on debut against France, to help his side secure a draw.

== See also ==
- List of Ireland national rugby union players
