= Keith Macklin =

British journalist and rugby league commentator (1931–2009)

Keith Macklin (19 January 1931 – 1 August 2009) was a British journalist, author, broadcaster and sports commentator.

He began his career with the BBC in the north of England, where he commentated on rugby league for the North of England Home Service in the 1950s and 1960s. He also contributed to Woman's Hour when it was broadcast from the north, much presentation work on religious programmes including Songs of Praise and Sunday Half Hour, and had a stint as presenter of Rugby Special (usually covering rugby union), national coverage of rugby league for BBC Radio 2, a TV series of hospital visits entitled A Spoonful of Sugar in 1967/8 and a Sport of the Day Saturday BBC2 series in 1965.

Macklin was also a presenter on BBC Look North in the mid-1960s and became a regular contributor to BBC Radio Merseyside in its infancy, covering sport. In 1969, he was the first presenter of the BBC programme Pot Black, and shortly afterwards he joined Yorkshire Television as a football commentator, where he would remain until 1976. He also commentated on the 1974 World Cup for the ITV network, covering the only full international match ever played between the West and East German national sides, and presented the religious series Junior Sunday Quiz for YTV. Subsequently, he worked for Red Rose Radio and reappeared as a reporter for ITV's Football First, which was later rebranded The Goal Rush in the late 1990s and early 2000s. During the 2000s, he worked as a rugby league reporter for BBC local radio stations in the North West of England.

== Bibliography ==
- The Rugby League Game (1967)
- The History of Rugby League (1974) ISBN 0-09-120780-0
- The Story of Rugby League (1984) ISBN 0-09-158411-6
- A Two Horse Town (2007) ISBN 978-1-903659-36-6 – London League Productions
