= London Welsh RFC =

Defunct professional rugby union club based in London, England

(England) London Welsh
- Full name: London Welsh Rugby Football Club
- Union: Middlesex RFU, Wales RU
- Nickname(s): Exiles, Dragons, Welsh
- Founded: 1885; 141 years ago
- Disbanded: 2017; 9 years ago
- Location: Richmond, Richmond upon Thames, London, England
- Ground: Old Deer Park (Capacity: 5000 (1,000 seats))
- Chairman: Danny Griffiths
- Coach: Cai Griffiths
- Captain: Chris Lilly
1st kit	2nd kit

Official website
- www.londonwelshrfc.com

London Welsh Rugby Football Club was a rugby union club formed in 1885. Based in Old Deer Park, Richmond-upon-Thames, London Welsh RFC played in the English Premiership in the 2012–13 and 2014–15 seasons, after gaining promotion from the RFU Championship in the 2012 and 2014 play-off final. The club returned to Old Deer Park in 2015 after three seasons at the Kassam Stadium, Oxford.

The club went into liquidation in December 2016 and was given a temporary licence to complete two fixtures in the Championship. Chairman at the time Bleddyn Phillips claimed to have sold the club to a California-based investment group led by Welshman Trevor Owen Shaw, but no contract or funds ever materialised.

On 24 January 2017 it was announced that London Welsh had been removed from the RFU Championship and their results expunged. The RFU stated that their place in the league was "untenable" and the club were dissolved. The remnants of the defunct club were amalgamated into their amateur set up.

== Affiliated teams ==
During professionalism, London Welsh's first-XV squad were fully professional, and they were complemented with the London Welsh Amateurs, Druids and Occies. Following the changes at the club in the 2016/17 season the club operates the 1st XV and Druids 2nd XV that form the performance playing squad, the Occies 3rd XV and the Under 23s Griffins player pathway.

London Welsh has one of the longest-standing women's sides – LWWRFC – which celebrated thirty years of women's rugby at the club in the 2015–16 season. While still being amateur, the club has succeeded both in XVs in the winter and 7s during the summer as well as players representing England at the regional level and on the Wales national touch team. There is also a mini and junior section.

== History ==
=== Early years ===
London Welsh was formed in 1885 by and for London's Welsh community, and has played senior-level rugby since then. Its name in Welsh, is Clwb Rygbi Cymry Llundain.

=== 1960s ===
London Welsh enjoyed great success in the late 1960s. John Dawes was appointed captain, and effectively also as coach, for the 1965–66 season. He initially significantly increased fitness levels, and then led the club in an open, running, quick-passing, attacking style of rugby, including an overlapping full-back, and relatively skilled forwards. One 1968-69 performance was described by journalist John Reason as "one of the most brilliant exhibitions of club football it has been my privilege to see," and by journalist Terry O'Connor as "the finest display by a club team I can remember', further describing London Welsh 'switching attacks with speed and handling skill.'

Seven London Welsh players were selected for the 1971 British Lions tour to New Zealand (a Lions record which remains unbroken to this day).

=== 2006-9 ===
In December 2006, London Welsh revealed their ambition to leave the English league and become the fifth Welsh team in the Celtic League. The club later appeared to go back on this report, claiming they had been misquoted and said this would only be considered if the English Premiership decided to prohibit promotion/relegation, but confirmed their hopes of ground-sharing with Brentford FC either at their current stadium Griffin Park or a new 20,000 seat ground to be built at Lionel Road, near Kew Bridge.

=== 2009–12: Championship era ===
In June 2009, the club went into administration shortly after turning professional. They were bought from the receivers in July 2009 by Saudex Global, owned by Neil Hollinshead, and allowed to continue in The Championship, albeit with a five-point deduction. According to the BBC in March 2011, court documents show that Hollinshead is "alleged to have submitted forged documents and fake bank account details in order to continue his control of London Welsh and that he repeatedly lied to ensure that ownership of London Welsh was transferred over to him." The former shareholders of London Welsh RFC rescinded the 2009 agreement, by which they sold the shares of the club to Hollinshead, and had regained control by January 2010.

The 2010–11 season was the club's 125th anniversary and to kick off the celebrations they held a military tattoo on the evening of Wednesday 25 August at Old Deer Park with the Band and Corps of Drums of the Welsh Guards, plus the London Welsh Rugby Club Choir.

=== 2012–15: Premiership era and relocation to Oxford ===
On 1 June 2012, it was revealed that Crystal Palace co-chairman Steve Parish had approached senior figures at the club about a possible ground-share at Selhurst Park, as the club's plans to play their matches at Kassam Stadium in Oxford were deemed unsuitable by the RFU, after securing promotion to the English Premiership. However a legal appeal by the club against the RFU's actions was upheld on 28 June 2012, after the appeal panel ruled that the criteria were in breach of EU and UK competition laws. Promotion was ultimately secured when it was announced that Newcastle Falcons, the club facing relegation from the Premiership, would not appeal against the ruling. A move to the Kassam Stadium was then confirmed for the 2012–13 season.

In 2013 London Welsh caused controversy by fielding an ineligible player (Tyson Keats) in nine league matches during the season, eventually receiving a 5-point deduction and £10,000 fine.

On 14 April 2013, London Welsh were relegated from the English Premiership in their first season (pending the winners of the RFU Championship meeting the Premiership entry requirements) after a 14–31 defeat at home to Northampton Saints. Newcastle Falcons were eligible for promotion and therefore confirmed Welsh's relegation.

On 4 June 2014, London Welsh won promotion to the English Premiership again, defeating Bristol Rugby 27–8 at home and 21–20 away, 48–28 on aggregate. However, the club endured a difficult season back in the English top flight, and suffered defeat in all of their 22 league fixtures of the regular season, claiming only 1 bonus point throughout the entire campaign. The team therefore finished bottom and was relegated to the RFU Championship for the 2015–16 season. The team was also defeated in every single European Challenge Cup game, as well as every single Anglo-Welsh cup game. As a result, they became the first top-flight English side for over 10 years to suffer defeat in every single competitive match over a season.

=== 2015–2017: return to Richmond and liquidation ===
The club left Oxford and returned to Old Deer Park at the end of the 2014–15 season. Following the return the club, led by head coach Rowland Phillips, went on to win the British and Irish Cup, beating Yorkshire Carnegie 10–33. Phillips then moved on to take up a coaching role with the Welsh Rugby Union. He was succeeded by forwards coach James Buckland who took the role of head coach, assisted by Sonny Parker and Richard Tonkin.

HMRC petitioned the High Court to wind up the club in September 2016 due to unresolved debts. The debts were paid and the petition was dismissed by the High Court. HMRC returned to court with a second winding-up petition in October 2016 and the insolvency court granted a stay of two weeks to arrange refinancing. After failing to pay their debts, the club went into voluntary liquidation on 23 December 2016. The club ceased to be a member of the RFU at that point and the liquidator stated that London Welsh would not be fulfilling the club's fixtures in the league. A separate entity, "Rugby 1885 Limited", was created on 21 December 2016. The club were deducted 20 points from the Championship dropping them from 5th to 12th. Rugby 1885 Limited were granted a temporary licence to complete London Welsh's two fixtures until a further decision on their future in the Championship. When the temporary licence expired on 17 January 2017, the RFU Board met and extended a deadline to allow the new entity to show it could meet RFU regulations. After a further deadline was not met, on 24 January 2017 it was announced by the RFU that London Welsh had been removed from the Championship and their results expunged. The RFU stated that their place in the league was "untenable".

== Honours ==
- Middlesex Sevens winners (8 times): 1930, 1931, 1956, 1968, 1971, 1972, 1973, 1984
- Hawick Sevens
  - Champions (1): 1969
- John Player Cup runner-up 1985
- Courage League Division 5 South champions: 1994–95
- RFU Championship champions (2 times): 2011–12, 2013–14
- British and Irish Cup winners 2015–16

Merit Table Rugby

Sunday Telegraph Pennants

- English-Welsh champions 1967–68, 1970–71

runner-up 1965–66 third 1971–72

- English champions 1966–67, 1967–68, 1968–69, 1970–71, 1977–78, 1978–79,

runner-up 1965–66, 1971–72 third 1972–73

- Welsh champions 1970–71, 1971–72

third 1965–66

Herts & Middlesex 1 Champions 2017/18 season

London 3 NW Champions 2018/19 Season

Western Mail

- Welsh Championship champions 1972–73

runner-up 1967–68, 1971–72

Daily Mail

- Anglo-Welsh third 1978–79

Whitbread

- Welsh Merit Table champions 1971–72

Promotions

- National Division 4 – runner-up, 1995–6 (fourth tier of English rugby)
- Jewson National League 1 – 3rd, 1997–98 (third tier of English rugby)
- Lowest league position 6th 1993–4 Courage League Division 5 South (5th tier)
- Highest league position 12th Aviva Premiership 2012–13 (1st tier)

== Notable former players ==
=== Players who have won international and Lions caps ===
Over the years the club has contributed 177 players to the Wales national team and 43 players to the British & Irish Lions.

Seven London Welsh players were selected for the 1971 tour to New Zealand (a Lions record which remains unbroken to this day): captain John Dawes, J. P. R. Williams, Gerald Davies, Mervyn Davies, John Taylor (now Managing Director and ITV commentator), Mike Roberts and Geoff Evans.

=== British and Irish Lions ===
The following former players were selected for the British & Irish Lions touring squads while playing for London Welsh.

- (Wales) Robert Ackerman 1983
- (Wales) Gerald Davies 1971
- (Wales) Mervyn Davies 1971
- (Wales) John Dawes 1971
- (Wales) Geoff Evans 1971
- (Wales) Vivian Jenkins 1938
- (Wales) Tommy Jones-Davies 1930
- (Wales) Arthur Harding 1904,1908
- (Wales) Alun Lewis 1977
- (Wales) Douglas Marsden-Jones 1924
- (Wales) Teddy Morgan 1904
- (Wales) Billy Raybould 1968
- (Wales) Clive Rees 1974
- (Wales) Mike Roberts 1971
- (Wales) John Taylor 1968,1971
- (Wales) J. P. R. Williams 1971,1974
- (Wales) Jack Williams 1908

=== Wales International Captains ===
The following former players captained the Wales national rugby union team while playing for London Welsh.

See also Wales rugby union captains

- Teddy Morgan 1908
- Wick Powell 1927
- John Dawes 1968–71

=== Other notable former players ===
See also Category:London Welsh RFC players

- (Wales) Lee Beach
- (England) Neil Bennett
- (Wales) Norman Biggs
- (Wales) Kevin Bowring
- (Wales) Ronnie Boon
- (Wales) Trevor Brewer
- (Wales) Gavin Henson
- (Wales) Colin Charvis
- (Wales) Willie Davies
- (Wales) Rhys Gabe
- (Wales) Arthur "Monkey" Gould
- (Wales) Bob Gould
- (Wales) Tony Gray
- (Wales) James Hannan
- (Wales) Arthur 'Boxer' Harding
- (Wales) Keith Jarrett
- (Wales) Arthur Lewis
- (England) Tom May
- (Wales) J. P. R. Williams
- (Wales) Gerald Davies
- (Wales) Mervyn Davies
- (Wales) Bryn Meredith
- (South Africa) JEC 'Birdie' Partridge
- (Wales) Reg Plummer
- (Wales) Wick Powell
- (Wales) Arthur Rees
- (Wales) Tommy Rees
- (Wales) Tom Shanklin
- (Wales) Haydn Tanner
- (Wales) Watcyn Thomas
- (Wales) Harry Uzzell
- (New Zealand) Piri Weepu
- (Wales) Frank Whitcombe
- (Wales) Jeff Young

== London Welsh Football Club ==
The club set up an association football side in 1890 called London Welsh FC. They continue to this day in their own right, based in Chiswick.

== See also ==
- London Welsh Amateur
- London Scottish
- London Irish
- Rugby union in London

== Bibliography ==
- Jones, Stephen; Beken, Paul (1985). Dragon in Exile, The Centenary History of London Welsh R.F.C. London: Springwood Books. ISBN 0-86254-125-5.
