= Mervyn Davies (rugby union) =

British Lions & Wales international rugby union player (1946-2012)

Mervyn Davies OBE
- Born: Thomas Mervyn Davies; 9 December 1946 Swansea, Wales
- Died: 15 March 2012 (aged 65)
- Height: 1.93 m (6 ft 4 in)
- Weight: 93 kg (14 st 9 lb)
- School: Penlan County School

Rugby union career
- Position: Number eight
Amateur team(s)
Years	Team	Apps	(Points)
1968-1972	London Welsh RFC	81	(43)
1972-1976	Swansea RFC	88	(60)
–	Barbarian F.C.		
–	Surrey		
International career
Years	Team	Apps	(Points)
1969–1976	Wales	38	(7)
1971–1974	British Lions	8	(0)

Thomas Mervyn Davies (9 December 1946 – 15 March 2012), often known as "Merv the Swerve", was a Welsh rugby union player who won 38 caps for Wales as a No. 8.

== Early life ==
Davies was born in Swansea, where he attended Penlan Comprehensive School. His father had played club rugby.

== Rugby playing career ==
Tall and slight of frame, he grew a Mexican moustache to make himself appear more aggressive on the rugby field. He was nicknamed "Merv the Swerve".

=== Club rugby ===
Davies joined Old Guildfordians for the 1968-69 season before moving to London Welsh, later moving to Swansea.

=== Wales and Lions international rugby ===
Davies won his first cap for Wales in 1969 against Scotland, going on to play 38 consecutive matches for Wales and scoring two tries. During this period Wales won two Grand Slams and three Triple Crowns.

He went on the British and Irish Lions tours to New Zealand in 1971 and to South Africa in 1974, playing in all eight tests. Colin Meads said Davies was "the one player who probably had the biggest impact on that 1971 Lions Test series," particularly as he prevented NZ winning line out ball via Brian Lochore. Willie John McBride and Ian McLauchlan both said Davies was even better on the 1974 tour. Davies captained the Welsh side in 1975, when they won the five nations championship, and in 1976, achieving the 'Grand Slam'. Many expected Davies to captain the 1977 Lions but they were led instead by Phil Bennett and Davies did not make the touring party to New Zealand after his haemorrhage in 1976.

In a total of 46 international appearances for Wales and the Lions he only ended on the losing side nine times.

=== Appraisal ===
Davies key attributes were lineout play, ball handling skill (including offloading in tight situations), commitment, mental strength, and anticipation.

In 2001 Davies was inducted into the International Rugby Hall of Fame. In a poll of Welsh rugby fans in 2002, he was voted both Greatest Ever Welsh Captain and Greatest Ever Welsh Number 8. Davies continues to be rated as one of the best No. 8s ever to have played the game.

== Retirement ==
His career was ended by a subarachnoid hemorrhage suffered when captaining Swansea against Pontypool in 1976. He had collapsed during a game on another occasion, four years earlier, and had been wrongly diagnosed with meningitis. Following the second incident he was a patient in the University Hospital of Wales for several months, and received goodwill messages from all over the world.

He was a smoker and was diagnosed with lung cancer (adenocarcinoma) in November 2011. He died 4 months later.

Davies had a son and daughter by his first wife Shirley; the marriage ended in divorce. He is survived by his second wife Jeni and his three stepchildren, and by his two children from his first marriage.

== Sources ==
- Mervyn Davies & David Roach - In Strength and Shadow (Mainstream, 2005)
- The Mervyn Davies Story (BBC2, September 2007)
