= Peter Dixon =

English rugby union player (1944–2023)

- Born: Peter John Dixon; 30 April 1944 Keighley, West Yorkshire, England
- Died: 2 August 2023 (aged 79) Cumbria, England
- Height: 6 ft 3 in (191 cm)
- University: Durham University (Grey College) Postgraduate at Oxford University

Rugby union career
- Position: Flanker
Amateur team(s)
Years	Team	Apps	(Points)
1967–1970	Oxford University RFC		
–	Harlequins		
International career
Years	Team	Apps	(Points)
1971–1978	England	22	(16)
1971	British Lions	3	(3)

Peter-John Dixon (30 April 1944 – 2 August 2023) was an England international rugby union player.

== Early years and education ==
Dixon was born in Yorkshire. His father, an RAF pilot, died in a flying accident two months before Dixon was born. His mother married twice more, with all her husbands predeceasing her. She died in 2012.

Dixon was educated at St Bees, a public school in Cumbria, and represented England Schoolboys in 1961.

Dixon studied at Durham University. He then attended Oxford University as a postgraduate student. He studied geography and social anthropology.

== Rugby union ==
=== Club level ===
Dixon played for Oxford University RFC in four consecutive Varsity Matches from 1967 to 1970. He also played fives at Oxford.

He played for Workington, Gosforth and Harlequins.

=== England regions ===
He played for Cumberland at county level alongside David Robinson and Butler in the back row and with Cowman at fly half. The northern section of the county championship found him playing against Gosforth and later England colleague Roger Utley and against Alan Old and Warfield (Yorkshire) and Tony Neary, Fran Cotton, Bill Beaumont and Mike Slemen (Lancashire). With several of these he played in the Northwest Counties team that in 1972, at Workington, became the first regional team to defeat a New Zealand All Blacks' touring team. He also played in the North of England provincial team that beat the All Blacks in 1979.

=== England ===
Dixon won 22 caps for England.

=== British Lions ===
Dixon was selected, before he had played for England, for the tour to New Zealand in 1971 with the victorious British and Irish Lions. He playing in the first and second tests, was dropped for the third and returned for the fourth.. He subsequently turned down selection for Lions tours in 1974 and 1977 because of his commitments at Durham.

== Career ==
Dixon worked in overseas development at Durham University, and at the University of Transkei, Institute of Adult Education. He lived in a black homeland in Transkei from 1987 to 1990, while lecturing in anthropology.

He later undertook consultancy work for the Overseas Development Association, in Bangladesh, Venezuela and Africa.

== Personal life ==
At Oxford Dixon met his wife, Alyson (née Plummer), a teacher. She had multiple sclerosis diagnosed when she was 19. They had two children. Dixon acted as a carer for his wife, before predecessing her.

Dixon did not attend players' reunions.

== Death ==
Peter Dixon died of brain cancer in Cumbria, on 2 August 2023, at the age of 79.

Sporting positions
Preceded by Bob Hiller	English National Rugby Union Captain; 1972	Succeeded by John Pullin
