= Wick Powell =

Wales international rugby union player

- Born: William Charles Powell; 1905 Aberbeeg, Blaenau Gwent, Wales
- Died: 1973 (aged 67–68) South Africa
- Height: 5 ft 10 in (178 cm)
- Weight: 11 st 0 lb (70 kg)
- Occupation: architect

Rugby union career
- Position: Scrum-half
Amateur team(s)
Years	Team	Apps	(Points)
- Abertillery RFC
–	Crawshays RFC		
–	London Welsh RFC		
–	London Wasps		
–	Northampton Saints		
–	The Army		
–	Barbarians F.C.		
–	Middlesex County		
International career
Years	Team	Apps	(Points)
1926-1935	Wales	27	(13)

William Charles "Wick" Powell (1905–1973) was a Welsh international rugby union scrum-half who played club rugby for London Welsh and county rugby for Middlesex. Powell was a powerful passer whose speciality was the reverse pass, though he is often remembered for his varying displays for his country that sometimes would lose as much as win games.

== Rugby career ==
Powell first came to note when at the age of 16 was invited to tour with invitational team Crawshays. While 16, and as a Welsh Guardsman, he turned out for the Army XV. He left the army to qualify as an architect, and in 1926, while playing for London Welsh, he was brought into the Welsh squad against Scotland. Although Wales lost the match 8–5, Powell was hailed as a success as he appeared to complete his task of subduing Scotland's Ian Smith, who had scored seven tries in his last two games against Wales. Powell later captained Wales on two occasions, the first time against France in 1927, on only his fifth cap. He captained Wales again the next match against Ireland, but although his last captaincy he represented Wales 27 times until 1935.

=== International matches played ===
Wales

- England 1927, 1929, 1931, 1932, 1935
- France 1926, 1927, 1928, 1929, 1930, 1931
- Ireland 1926, 1927, 1928, 1929, 1930, 1931, 1932, 1935
- South Africa 1931
- Scotland 1926, 1928, 1929, 1930, 1931, 1932, 1935

== Bibliography ==
- Goodwin, Terry (1984). The International Rugby Championship 1883-1983. London: Willow Books. ISBN 0-00-218060-X.
- Smith, David; Williams, Gareth (1980). Fields of Praise: The Official History of The Welsh Rugby Union. Cardiff: University of Wales Press. ISBN 0-7083-0766-3.
- Thomas, Wayne (1979). A Century of Welsh Rugby Players. Ansells Ltd.
