= Bruce Hunter (rugby union) =

- Born: Bruce Anthony Hunter; 16 September 1950 (age 76) Oamaru, New Zealand
- Height: 1.75 m (5 ft 9 in)
- Weight: 70 kg (150 lb)
- School: Waitaki Boys' High School

Rugby union career
- Position: Wing
Provincial / State sides
Years	Team	Apps	(Points)
1969–73	Otago		
International career
Years	Team	Apps	(Points)
1970–71	New Zealand	3	(0)

Bruce Anthony Hunter (born 16 September 1950) is a former New Zealand rugby union player and middle-distance athlete.

== Rugby union ==
A wing three-quarter, Hunter represented Otago at a provincial level, and was a member of the New Zealand national side, the All Blacks, from 1970 to 1971. He played 10 matches for the All Blacks including three internationals.

Although Hunter was explosive on the rugby field, it was his passion for education that lead him into a career in teaching, where he focused on Physical Education. It was at Shirley Boys' High School, where Hunter spent much of his teaching career, that he mastered the rare vocal trait known as 'The Worble." A Worble is when ones volume is able to instantly increase randomly in the middle of sentences, before returning to the normal, acceptable level.

== Athletics ==
Hunter won the national 800 m title at the New Zealand athletics championships in 1970, 1971 and 1975. He missed selection for the Munich Olympics, along with John Walker, when both of them missed the qualifying time of 1min 47.5 by only 0.1 seconds. He represented New Zealand in the 800m at the New Zealand Games, held in Christchurch in 1975. He then went on in his teaching career at Shirley BHS to coach a number of successful athletes to NZSec School honours, most notably David Kett who represented NZ at U19 level in 800 m himself. Interestingly, David also switched to a rugby career in his early 20s mirroring his coach's pathway. David played for the Canterbury Rugby rep team in the early 1990s at mostly Centre. Bruce had a long running career, preferring to train with his athletes, eventually retiring from competition at age 40, still capable of a 2min 800 m.
