= Geoff Evans (rugby union, born 1942) =

British Lions & Wales international rugby union player

Thomas Geoffrey Evans (born 1 May 1942) is a former Wales international rugby union player, who was born in Llanelli. In 1971 he toured New Zealand with the British and Irish Lions as a replacement. He won seven Wales caps as a lock forward at the start of the 1970s and also played club rugby for London Welsh RFC.

He was appointed a Welsh selector in 1993 and became manager of the Wales RFU team in 1995, following the resignation of the previous management after Wales lost all four matches in the Five Nations championship.
