= Jim Neilly =

Northern Irish broadcaster

James Bernard Neilly MBE is a broadcaster from Northern Ireland known for his sports commentary, especially rugby union and boxing.

He grew up in Merville Garden Village, Whitehouse, Newtownabbey, Northern Ireland.

Formerly a teacher of science in the Belfast Boys' Model School, Neilly joined the BBC as a sports commentator and TV presenter in 1978. He has covered the Commonwealth Games, Olympic Games, Rugby Five Nations' Championship and the Irish Rugby Tours in the southern hemisphere, as well as numerous boxing and Gaelic football matches. He became Head of Sport and Events for BBC Northern Ireland after eleven years, although he continued working as a presenter and commentator on radio and television, including presenting Midweek Sportsound.

Moving into freelance commentating in 1993, he became BBC Network Boxing Commentator, succeeding Harry Carpenter. Since 1994 he has commentated on Rugby Union as well as on boxing.

He was the 2013/14 President of the Ulster Reform Club.

Neilly was awarded a Member of the Order of the British Empire (MBE) in the 2020 Birthday Honours for services to sports broadcasting and charity in Northern Ireland.
