= Richie Guy =

Richie Guy ONZM
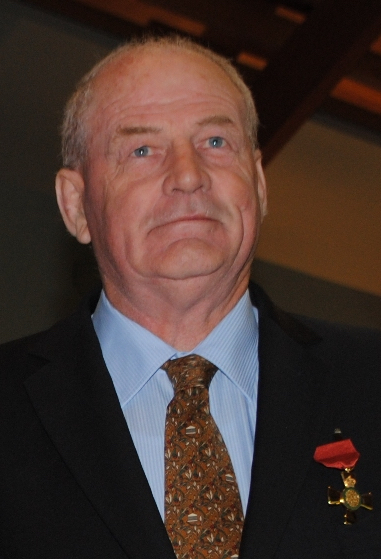
- Guy in 2012
- Born: Richard Alan Guy; 6 April 1941 (age 85) Lower Hutt, New Zealand
- Height: 1.88 m (6 ft 2 in)
- Weight: 93 kg (14 st 9 lb)
- School: Henderson High School; Waipu District High School
- Notable relative: Ernie Guy (father)
- Occupation: Beef farmer

Rugby union career
- Position: Prop
Amateur team(s)
Years	Team	Apps	(Points)
1966–74	Waipu		
Provincial / State sides
Years	Team	Apps	(Points)
1966–74	North Auckland	91	
International career
Years	Team	Apps	(Points)
1971–72	New Zealand	4	(0)

Richard Alan Guy ONZM (born 6 April 1941) is a New Zealand former international rugby union player and rugby administrator.

== Playing career ==
He played four test matches for New Zealand, the All Blacks, in 1971—all against the touring British Lions. He also played five non-Test matches in a domestic tour of New Zealand by the national team in 1972. Provincially he played for North Auckland (now Northland) between 1966 and 1974, before becoming involved in rugby as an administrator.

== Administration ==
By 1981 he was chairman of the North Auckland union, and joined the New Zealand Rugby Football Union (NZRFU, now New Zealand Rugby) council in 1984. He was team manager for the All Blacks in 1986 and 1987, including during their successful 1987 Rugby World Cup campaign. He continued as an administrator, including as chairman of the NZRFU in 1995 and 1996 when the game was transitioning to professionalism, until 2001 when he was unseated from the board. His chairmanship in 1995 and 1996 was particularly significant, the NZRFU formed a consortium (SANZAR) with the national unions of Australia and South Africa in order to administer two new competitions: Super 12 and the Tri-Nations Championship. The significant broadcast revenue from the new competitions forced the International Rugby Board to abolish their regulations regarding amateurism and sanction full professionalism.

In 2002 Guy was made the first life member, for "exceptional service", of the New Zealand Rugby Union. In the 2012 Queen's Birthday and Diamond Jubilee Honours, for his services to rugby, Guy was appointed an Officer of the New Zealand Order of Merit.

== Sources ==
- Knight, Linsey. "Richie Guy". New Zealand Rugby.
- "Richie Guy". New Zealand: Government House.
- Barrington, Mike (4 June 2012). "Queen's Birthday honours: Richie Guy". The Northern Advocate.
- "Our Members". New Zealand Rugby.
- "Kiwi rugby legend looks back on changing game". Local Matters. 6 September 2011.
