= Ian Smith (rugby union, born 1944) =

Scotland & HK international rugby union player & author

- Full name: Ian Sidney Gibson Smith
- Born: 16 June 1944 (age 82) Dundee, Scotland
- School: George Heriot's School
- University: University of Edinburgh
- Occupation: Dentist

Rugby union career
- Position: Fullback
International career
Years	Team	Apps	(Points)
1969–71	Scotland	8	(14)
1972	Hong Kong		

Ian Sidney Gibson Smith (born 16 June 1944) is a Scottish former international rugby union player and author.

== Biography ==
Born in Dundee, Smith was raised in Morningside, Edinburgh, and attended George Heriot's School. He would practise his kicking as a schoolboy with George Watson's College pupil Ian Robertson, later a Scotland teammate. A University of Edinburgh dentistry graduate, Smith competed in the varsity first XV and also played rugby in the services. He was a captain in the Royal Army Dental Corps, at one point stationed in Germany.

Smith, a fullback, gained his first Scotland call up out of the London Scottish thirds, having come to the attention of selectors playing for Combined Services. On debut at Murrayfield in 1969, Smith scored all of his team's points in a 6–3 win over the Springboks, including the match-winning try with five minutes remaining, set up by childhood friend Robertson. He played in Scotland's 1970 Calcutta Cup win over England and finished his two years in the team with eight caps. In 1972, Smith turned out at the Asian Championships with Hong Kong, where he had been posted.

Smith retired from being a dentist in 2022, and became an author. He published the novel The Man With Two Graves and an autobiography by the name of A Full Back Slower Than Your Average Prop. He has also written a holiday guide book called The W4H Best Holiday Planning Guide: You Can't Return a Bad Holiday, a book analysing modern rugby titled What Is Happening To Rugby: What Does The Future Hold For Rugby, and a motivational digital book available only on Kindle titled How To Overcome The Fear Of Failure: Are you not where you want to be, is fear of failing holding you back?

Smith uploads videos to his TikTok page under the pseudonym Writer's cramp. He has a following of 1.6 million and uploads videos in which he gives life advice to his audience. He also published the book 100 Life Lessons from TikTok by Writer's Cramp.

== Bibliography ==
Year	Title	Genre / Notes
2019	A Full Back Slower Than Your Average Prop	Autobiography
2024	What Is Happening To Rugby: What Does The Future Hold For Rugby	Sports Analysis
2024	How To Overcome The Fear Of Failure	Motivational
2025	The Man With Two Graves	Historical fiction
2025	The W4H Best Holiday Planning Guide: You Can't Return a Bad Holiday	Travel advice
2025	100 Life Lessons from TikTok	Motivational

== See also ==
- List of Scotland national rugby union players
