= Alex Wyllie =

New Zealand international rugby union player and coach (1944–2025)

Alex Wyllie MBE
- Born: Alexander John Wyllie; 30 August 1944 Christchurch, New Zealand
- Died: 22 March 2025 (aged 80) Picton, New Zealand
- Height: 1.85 m (6 ft 1 in)
- Weight: 102 kg (16 st 1 lb)
- School: St Andrew's College
- Notable relative: Richard Loe (nephew)

Rugby union career
- Position: Flanker
Amateur team(s)
Years	Team	Apps	(Points)
- Glenmark
Provincial / State sides
Years	Team	Apps	(Points)
1964–1979	Canterbury	210	
International career
Years	Team	Apps	(Points)
1970–1973	New Zealand	11	
Coaching career
- Years: Team
- 1982–1986: Canterbury
- 1988–1991: New Zealand
- 1995–1999: Argentina

Alexander John "Grizz" Wyllie MBE (30 August 1944 – 22 March 2025) was a New Zealand rugby union player and coach.

== Playing career ==
Wyllie began his rugby career playing for Glenmark Rugby Club, in North Canterbury. During his first-class career he played for Canterbury beginning in 1964 and played 210 matches for the province until 1979, serving as captain on over one hundred occasions. During this time, he was an integral part of such exploits for the province as the lifting of the Ranfurly Shield in 1969 from Hawke's Bay and then in 1972 from Auckland as well as captaining the province to wins over international touring sides such as England in 1973, Scotland in 1975 and Ireland in 1976.

Wyllie became an All Black in 1970 when he was selected to tour South Africa where he played in the second and third Tests. In the next three years, he played forty matches for New Zealand, including eleven Tests, and was captain on three occasions. Although he was discarded as an All Black after 1973, Wyllie remained a prominent player for Canterbury until 1979.

== Coaching ==
In 1982, Wyllie became coach of Canterbury and immediately enjoyed success when Canterbury won the Ranfurly Shield from Wellington and went on to hold the trophy for a record-equalling three years. Under his coaching, Canterbury won the National Provincial Championship (NPC) in 1983, and also recorded victories against international teams such as the British Lions in 1983 and the Wallabies in 1986.

In the 1986 New Year Honours, Wyllie was appointed a Member of the Order of the British Empire, for services to rugby football.

Wyllie became a national selector in 1986 and he and his Auckland rival John Hart had significant roles as assistant coaches to Brian Lochore when the All Blacks won the 1987 Rugby World Cup. In 1988 Wyllie succeeded Lochore as coach, much to the annoyance of many, especially in Auckland, who favoured Hart.

Despite initial success as All Black coach, a decline starting in the 1991 season led to the NZRFU appointing Hart as joint coach for the 1991 World Cup. After the unsuccessful campaign, Wyllie resigned while Hart was overlooked when Laurie Mains was selected as All Black coach.

In 1991, he also appeared as an All Black in the comedy film Old Scores.

Wyllie went on to take various coaching roles in England, Ireland, South Africa and Argentina and from 1996 to 1999 was in charge of the Argentina national side, taking the Pumas to the quarterfinals at the 1999 World Cup.

After the 1999 World Cup, Wyllie remained in Ireland to coach Clontarf.

== Later life and death ==
In June 2009, Wyllie attended the retirement ceremony for Argentinian captain, Agustín Pichot.

In retirement, Wyllie lived overlooking Queen Charlotte Sound / Tōtaranui near Picton. He died there on 22 March 2025, at the age of 80.

Sporting positions
Preceded by Brian Lochore	All Blacks coach 1988–1991	Succeeded by Laurie Mains
