= Bob Burgess =

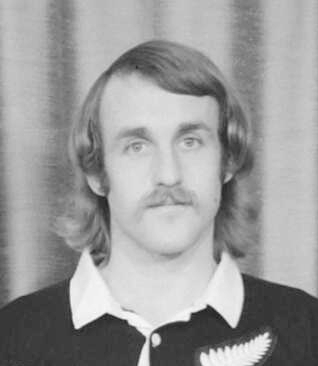
- Born: Robert Edward Burgess; 26 March 1949 (age 77) New Plymouth, New Zealand
- Height: 1.75 m (5 ft 9 in)
- Weight: 71 kg (157 lb)
- School: Hastings Boys' High School; Palmerston North Boys' High School
- University: Massey University

Rugby union career
- Position: First five-eighth
Amateur team(s)
Years	Team	Apps	(Points)
1973–75	Lyon Olympique Universitaire		
Provincial / State sides
Years	Team	Apps	(Points)
1967–73	Manawatu		
International career
Years	Team	Apps	(Points)
1968–70	New Zealand Universities		
1971–73	New Zealand	7	(6)

Robert Edward Burgess (26 March 1949) is a New Zealand rugby union player and academic. A first five-eighth, Burgess represented Manawatu at a provincial level, and was a member of the New Zealand national side, the All Blacks, from 1971 to 1973. He played 30 matches for the All Blacks including seven internationals. In 1970 Burgess refused nomination for the All Black trials for the tour of South Africa as a protest against that country's apartheid regime, and in 1981 he actively campaigned against the 1981 South African tour of New Zealand.

Burgess has a master's degree (1973) and a PhD (1984) in plant ecology from Massey University.

At the 1998 local-body elections, Burgess stood for the Palmerston North mayoralty, finishing fourth in a field of 15 candidates. He is married to New Zealand writer Linda Burgess.
