= Brian Muller =

New Zealander rugby union player (1942–2019)

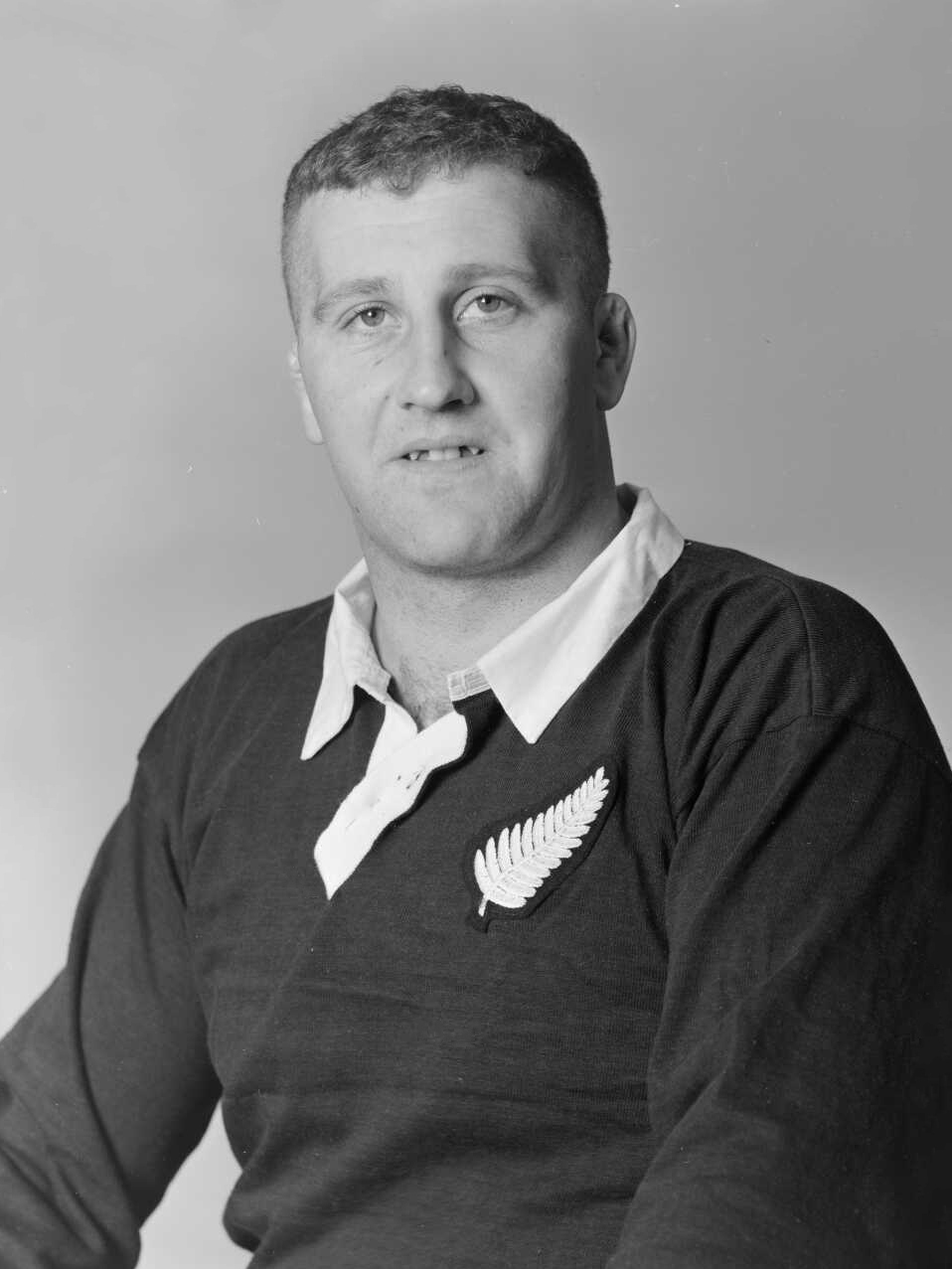
- Born: Brian Leo Muller; 11 June 1942 Eltham, New Zealand
- Died: 12 December 2019 (aged 77) Eltham, New Zealand
- Height: 1.85 m (6 ft 1 in)
- Weight: 114 kg (251 lb)
- School: St. Joseph's Convent School
- Occupation: Freezing worker

Rugby union career
- Position: Prop
Provincial / State sides
Years	Team	Apps	(Points)
1963–72	Taranaki	65	
International career
Years	Team	Apps	(Points)
1967–71	New Zealand	14	(0)

Brian Leo Muller (11 June 1942 – 12 December 2019) was a New Zealand rugby union player. A prop, Muller represented Taranaki at a provincial level, and was a member of the New Zealand national side, the All Blacks, from 1967 to 1971. He played 35 matches for the All Blacks including 14 internationals. He died on 12 December 2019 at the age of 77.
