= Nigel Starmer-Smith =

England international rugby union player

- Born: Nigel Christopher Starmer-Smith; 25 December 1944 (age 81) Cheltenham, England
- School: Magdalen College School, Oxford
- University: University College, Oxford
- Occupation(s): teacher, commentator, journalist

Rugby union career
- Position: Scrum-half
Amateur team(s)
Years	Team	Apps	(Points)
- Oxford University RFC
–	Harlequins		
–	Barbarian F.C.		
International career
Years	Team	Apps	(Points)
1969–1971	England	7	(0)

Nigel Starmer-Smith (born 25 December 1944) is an English retired international rugby union player, British rugby journalist and commentator.

He was educated at Magdalen College School, Oxford and University College, Oxford. After university, Starmer-Smith briefly trained at a shipping management firm before choosing to focus on a career in rugby.

== Playing career ==
Starmer-Smith played scrum-half for Oxford University (as a student at University College, Oxford) before progressing to senior club, Harlequins. He retired in 1975–76. During the 1966–67 season, while still at Oxford he was selected to play for British rugby's foremost invitational team the Barbarians. In 1969 he was selected to play for England against the touring 1969-70 Springboks.

== Non-playing career and journalism ==
In the late 1960s he taught geography at Epsom College.

He edited Rugby World magazine and narrated Rugby Special for the BBC for 15 years. He also commentated on Olympic hockey for the BBC, but had to make way for Barry Davies ahead of the 1988 Olympic Final.

During the 2003 World Cup in Australia, Starmer-Smith commentated for ITV Sport's coverage.

Starmer-Smith was the lead television commentator on the IRB Sevens World Series and also lead columnist for the global rugby sevens portal, UR7s.com during the 2000s.

On the 28 March 2021 edition of the BBC Radio 5 Live breakfast show, Starmer-Smith's son Charlie revealed that his father had been suffering from frontotemporal dementia since around 2015 and was living in a nursing home. Charlie subsequently wrote the song "Spotlight" to raise proceeds for charities treating dementia.
