= Mike Smith (rugby union) =

- Full name: Michael Adam Smith
- Born: 23 November 1945 (age 80) Liverpool, England
- School: Fettes College
- University: University of Cambridge
- Occupation: Medical doctor

Rugby union career
- Position: Centre / Wing
International career
Years	Team	Apps	(Points)
1970	Scotland	4	(3)

Michael Adam Smith (born 23 November 1945) is a Scottish former international rugby union player.

Born in Liverpool, Smith attended Fettes College and the University of Cambridge, where he gained two rugby blues as a varsity three-quarter. He subsequently played for London Scottish.

Smith was capped four times for Scotland in 1970. He came into the Scotland side for Alastair Biggar after they lost their opening Five Nations fixture and played the remaining three matches, including a Calcutta Cup win over England at Murrayfield, then went on the mid-year tour of Australia and featured on a wing for the one-off Test in Sydney.

== See also ==
- List of Scotland national rugby union players
