= Laurie Mains =

New Zealand rugby player (born 1946)

Laurie Mains MNZM
- Born: Laurence William Mains; 16 February 1946 (age 80) Dunedin, New Zealand
- Height: 1.80 m (5 ft 11 in)
- Weight: 78 kg (12 st 4 lb)
- School: King's High School
- Occupation: Residential building

Rugby union career
- Position: Fullback
Amateur team(s)
Years	Team	Apps	(Points)
- Southern
Provincial / State sides
Years	Team	Apps	(Points)
1967–76	Otago	115	(967)
International career
Years	Team	Apps	(Points)
1971–76	New Zealand	15	(153)
Coaching career
- Years: Team
- 1984–91: Otago
- 1992–95: New Zealand
- 2000–01: Cats
- 2002–03: Highlanders

Laurence William Mains MNZM (born 16 February 1946) is a former rugby union footballer and coach who represented New Zealand. Mains' representative career started when he first played for Otago in 1967. He made his All Blacks début in 1971, against the British and Irish Lions. His last Test was against Ireland in 1976. Although he toured South Africa in 1976, he played no Test matches.

Mains' coaching career started with Otago, whom he coached for eight years. He was appointed All Blacks coach in 1992, and coached them to the 1995 Rugby World Cup final; where they lost to South Africa.

In the 1998 New Year Honours, Mains was appointed a Member of the New Zealand Order of Merit, for services to rugby.

He is the current owner of GJ Gardner Homes in Dunedin, New Zealand, and is an oldboy of King's High School.

Sporting positions
Preceded by Alex Wyllie	All Blacks coach 1992–1995	Succeeded by John Hart
