= Wayne Cottrell =

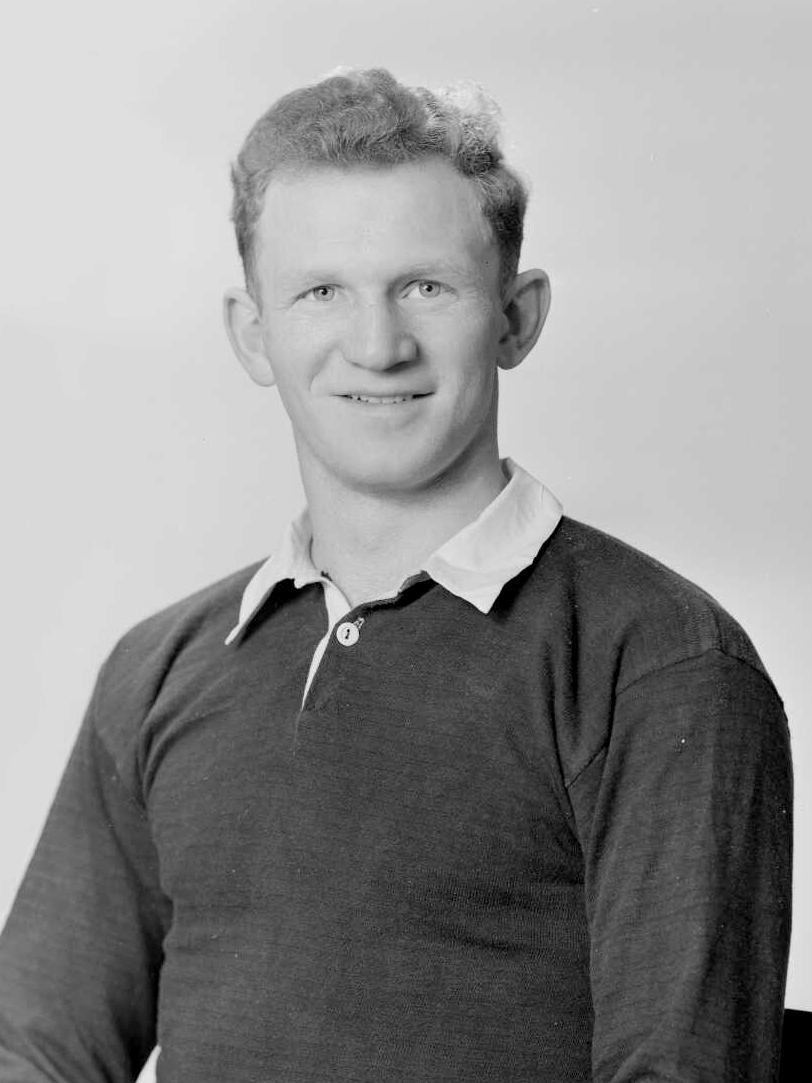
- Cottrell c.1967
- Born: Wayne David Cottrell; 30 September 1943 Christchurch, New Zealand
- Died: 22 May 2013 (aged 69) Christchurch, New Zealand
- Height: 1.80 m (5 ft 11 in)
- Weight: 82 kg (181 lb)
- School: Christchurch West High School
- Occupation: Baker

Rugby union career
- Position(s): First five-eighth Second five-eighth
Provincial / State sides
Years	Team	Apps	(Points)
1964–72	Canterbury	72	
International career
Years	Team	Apps	(Points)
1967–71	New Zealand	9	(6)

Wayne David Cottrell (30 September 1943 – 22 May 2013) was a New Zealand rugby union player. A first or second five-eighth, Cottrell represented Canterbury at a provincial level, and was a member of the New Zealand national side, the All Blacks, from 1967 to 1971. He played 37 matches for the All Blacks including nine internationals.
