= Mark Souster =

English journalist and broadcaster

Mark Souster (born 21 June 1958) is a retired English journalist and former broadcaster.

He replaced David Hands as rugby union correspondent of The Times in 2010. He moved to the city 4 years later. In early 2016, he was back with The Times and started covering horse racing for the paper, following the death of the paper's longtime racing correspondent, Alan Lee, in late 2015. His post ended in 2020.
