= John Frame (rugby union) =

Scotland international rugby union player

- Full name: John Neil Munro Frame
- Born: 8 October 1946 (age 80) Edinburgh, Scotland

Rugby union career
- Position: Centre
International career
Years	Team	Apps	(Points)
1967–73	Scotland	23	(13)

John Neil Munro Frame (born 8 October 1946) is a Scottish former rugby union international.

Born in Edinburgh, Frame was raised in Inverness and attended Glenalmond College, Perthshire.

Frame, a centre, played for Gala RFC and Edinburgh University RFC. He gained 23 caps for Scotland, making his debut in 1967 against the touring All Blacks at Murrayfield. In the 1971 centenary match against England, he scored two tries in a Scotland win, the first after only 13 seconds is one of the fastest known tries in international rugby.

== See also ==
- List of Scotland national rugby union players
