= Duncan Paterson =

Scottish international rugby union player (1943–2009)

- Born: Duncan Sinclair Paterson; 27 March 1943 Galashiels, Scotland
- Died: 22 December 2009 (aged 66)
- School: Galashiels Academy
- Notable relative: Chris Paterson

Rugby union career
- Position: Scrum-half
Amateur team(s)
Years	Team	Apps	(Points)
- Galashiels Academy
–	Gala RFC		
International career
Years	Team	Apps	(Points)
1969–72	Scotland	10	(6)
–	Scotland XV		
- Correct as of 2009-06-02

Duncan Paterson (27 March 1943 – 22 December 2009) was a Scottish rugby union player. He played at scrum-half, for Gala RFC at club level and was capped at international level for Scotland. While he had a short and quiet international career, he served in the administrative offices of the Scottish Rugby Union in the late 1990s.

== Playing career ==
Paterson earned his first international cap for Scotland against South Africa in December 1969. During the high-point of his career, Paterson started all of his country's matches during the 1971 Five Nations Championship. His most memorable match took place that same year against England at Twickenham Stadium, where the Scots had not won since 1938. With Scotland trailing 5–9 early in the first half, Paterson picked up a loose ball near the centre of the pitch following a line-out, and successfully booted a drop-goal. With about six minutes remaining in the match, however, England held a 15–8 advantage. Paterson, receiving the ball from a ruck, box-kicked the ball down the right-hand touch line, where Billy Steele appeared to knock it on. No knock-on was called however, and in a moment of hesitation by the English backs, Paterson swooped in and dotted the ball down for a try. Scotland went on to win 16–15 on a Peter Brown conversion of Chris Rea's last-minute try. These would be the only points which Duncan Paterson scored for his country.

After the 1971 Calcutta Cup match at Twickenham, Paterson was in the match against England at Murrayfield that next week. The match was the hundredth anniversary of Rugby's first international. Scotland defeated England for 26-6.

== Rugby administrator ==
With his international playing career behind him, Paterson turned his attention to a successful career in business, primarily in the knitwear and property sectors. In 1986 Paterson's role within the Scottish Rugby Union began in earnest when he was elected to the union's general committee. In 1990 he then succeeded Bob Munro as the team manager of the Scottish national team.

Paterson steered the Scottish team through two Rugby World Cups, the team reaching the semi-finals in 1991 and the quarter-finals in 1995. He was also the team manager for the 1993 Rugby World Cup Sevens tournament, which was held in Scotland.

Paterson is the uncle of Chris Paterson, Scottish rugby's all-time leading points scorer.
