= Brian Lochore =

New Zealand rugby union player and coach (1940–2019)

Sir Brian Lochore ONZ KNZM OBE
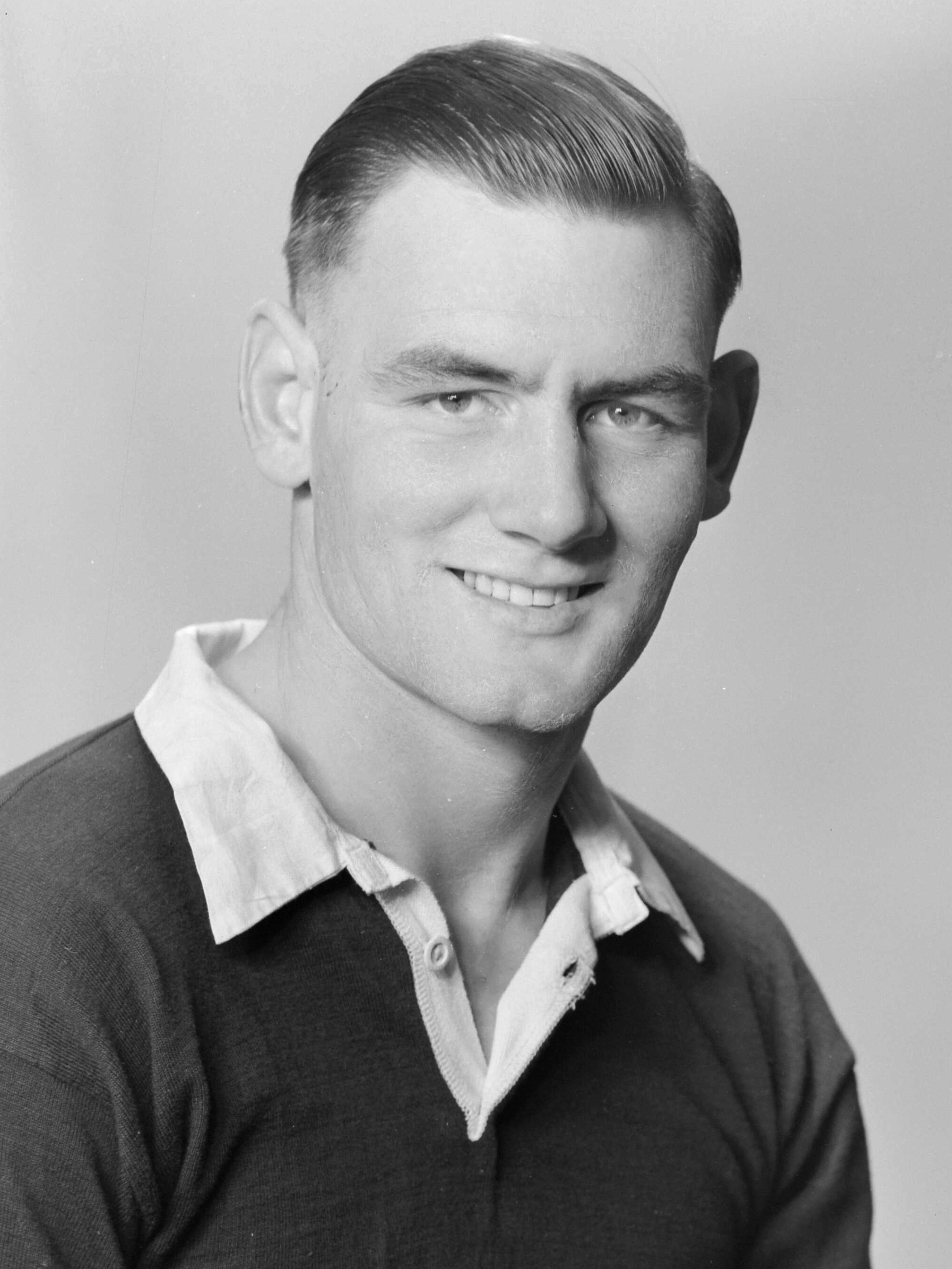
- Lochore in 1963
- Born: Brian James Lochore; 3 September 1940 Masterton, New Zealand
- Died: 3 August 2019 (aged 78) Masterton, New Zealand
- Height: 1.91 m (6 ft 3 in)
- Weight: 95 kg (209 lb)
- School: Wairarapa College

Rugby union career
- Position(s): Number 8, lock
Amateur team(s)
Years	Team	Apps	(Points)
1959–70	Masterton		
Provincial / State sides
Years	Team	Apps	(Points)
1959–70	Wairarapa		
International career
Years	Team	Apps	(Points)
1964–71	New Zealand	25	(21)
Coaching career
- Years: Team
- 1966–67, 75–78: Masterton
- 1980–82: Wairarapa Bush
- 1985–87: New Zealand

Sir Brian James Lochore ONZ KNZM OBE (3 September 1940 – 3 August 2019) was a New Zealand rugby union player and coach who represented and captained the New Zealand national team, the All Blacks. He played at number 8 and lock, as well as captaining the side 46 times (18 of those tests). In 1999, Lochore was inducted into the International Rugby Hall of Fame.

== Early life ==
Born in Masterton on 3 September 1940, Lochore was the son of Alma Joyce Lochore (née Wyeth) and James Denniston Lochore. He was first educated at Opaki Primary School and then Wairarapa College where he was a member of the 1st XV in 1956. In 1963, Lochore married Pamela Lucy Young.

== Career ==
Lochore played domestic rugby for Masterton and Wairarapa, debuting for both in 1959. After playing six tests, including all four tests of the 1965 South African tour of New Zealand, he was selected as captain by coach Fred Allen for the Lions tour in 1966. He continued as captain until his retirement from playing in 1970 (although at the selectors request he returned to play one game in 1971 for an injury-hit All Black side).

Lochore was also a Wairarapa tennis representative from 1957 to 1961 and then 1979 to 1980.

His involvement in the game did not end with his playing days. He coached Masterton before moving on to coach Wairarapa-Bush in 1980. Lochore became an All Black selector in 1983 before taking the side to victory in the inaugural World Cup during his coaching tenure from 1985 to 1987. Lochore continued to be involved in All Black rugby, firstly as the team's campaign manager in the 1995 World Cup, and later as one of the All Black selectors.

== After retirement ==
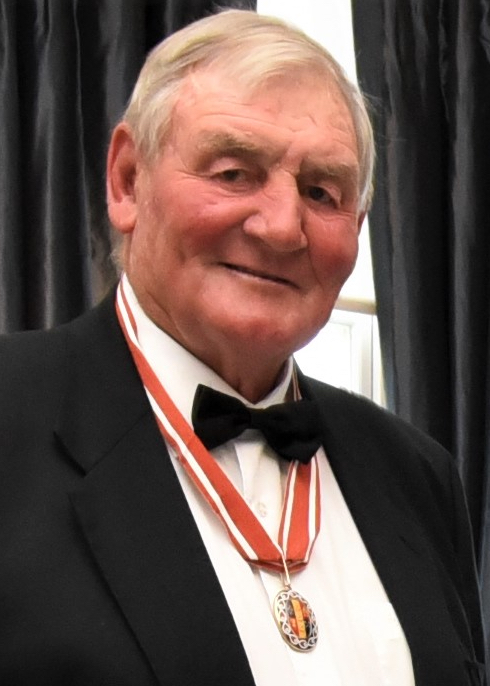
Lochore at the 2018 Order of New Zealand dinner

Lochore was also an advocate for conservation and was Chair of the Queen Elizabeth II National Trust for eight years from 2003 to 2011, an independent charitable trust that partners with private landowners to protect natural and cultural heritage sites on their land with covenants.

Lochore was appointed an Officer of the Order of the British Empire (OBE), for services to rugby football, in the 1970 Queen's Birthday Honours. In the 1999 Queen's Birthday Honours, he was appointed a Knight Companion of the New Zealand Order of Merit (KNZM), for services to sport and the community.

The Lochore Cup, contested in New Zealand's domestic competition, the Heartland Championship, is named in his honour. On Waitangi Day (6 February) 2007, Lochore was inducted into the Order of New Zealand as an additional member (ONZ); the Order of New Zealand is the country's highest honour.

In his biography, Sir Colin Meads wrote: "at the peak of his career, from 1966 through to 1969, he was everything I would want in a number 8. He spared himself, not an ounce working away in the tight-loose, covering, winning us great lineout ball in the deep, backing and filling and playing his part in the rolling drive-and-feed. As a captain he could be self-effacing, for this was the very nature of the man".

== Death ==
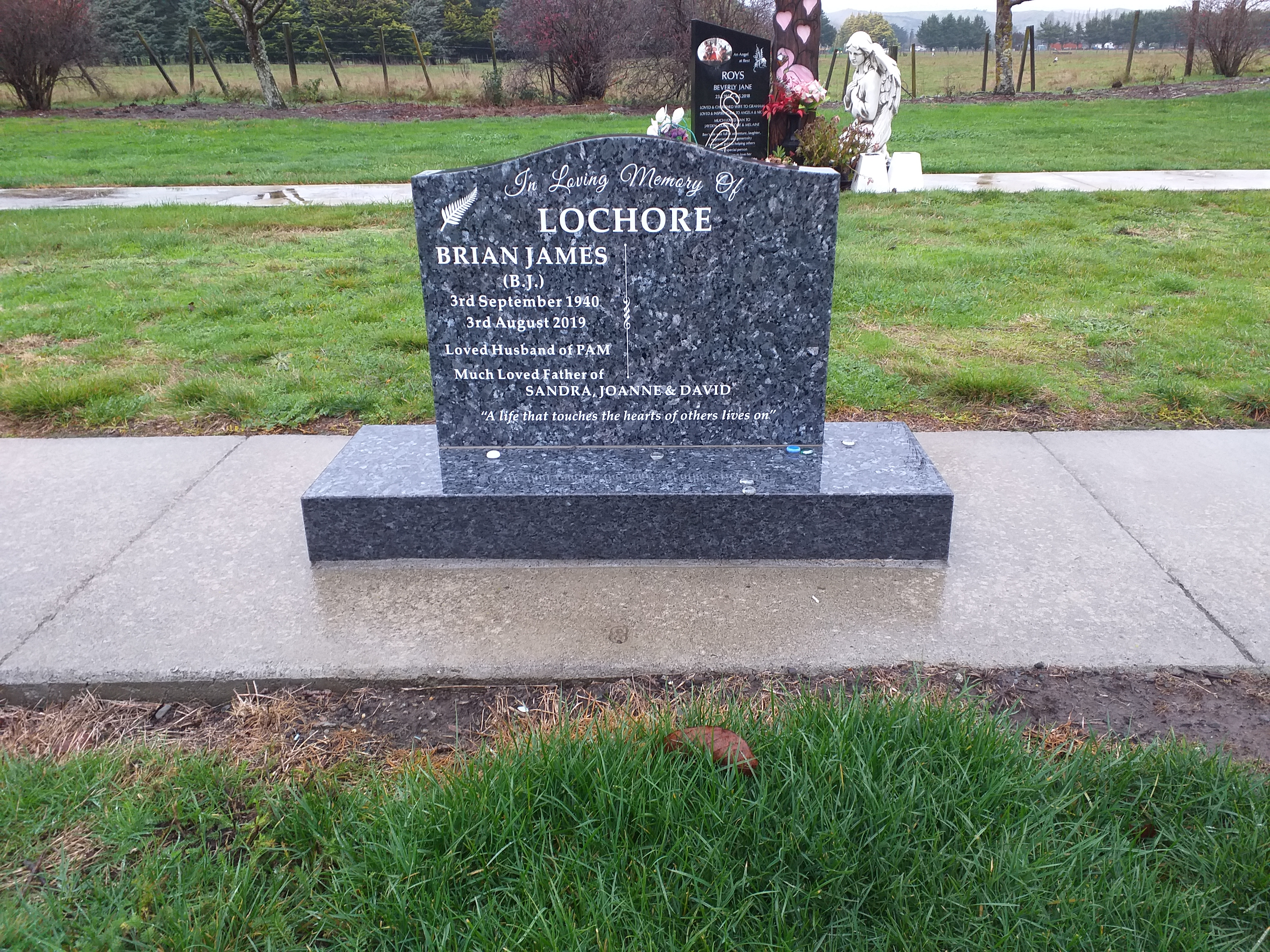
Lochore's gravestone at Riverside Cemetery, Masterton.

In June 2019, Rugby Union chief executive Steve Tew announced Lochore had been diagnosed with bowel cancer. Lochore died on 3 August that year, aged 78.

Lochore's funeral was held on 8 August at Memorial Park, Masterton, with around 2,500 people attending. He is buried in Masterton's Riverside Cemetery.

Sporting positions
Preceded by John Graham	All Blacks captain 1966–1970	Succeeded by Colin Meads
Preceded by Bryce Rope	All Blacks coach 1985–1987	Succeeded by Alex Wyllie
Awards
New award	Halberg Awards – Coach of the Year; 1987	Succeeded by Lois Muir
