= John Dawes =

British Lions & Wales international rugby union player and coach (1940–2021)

John Dawes OBE
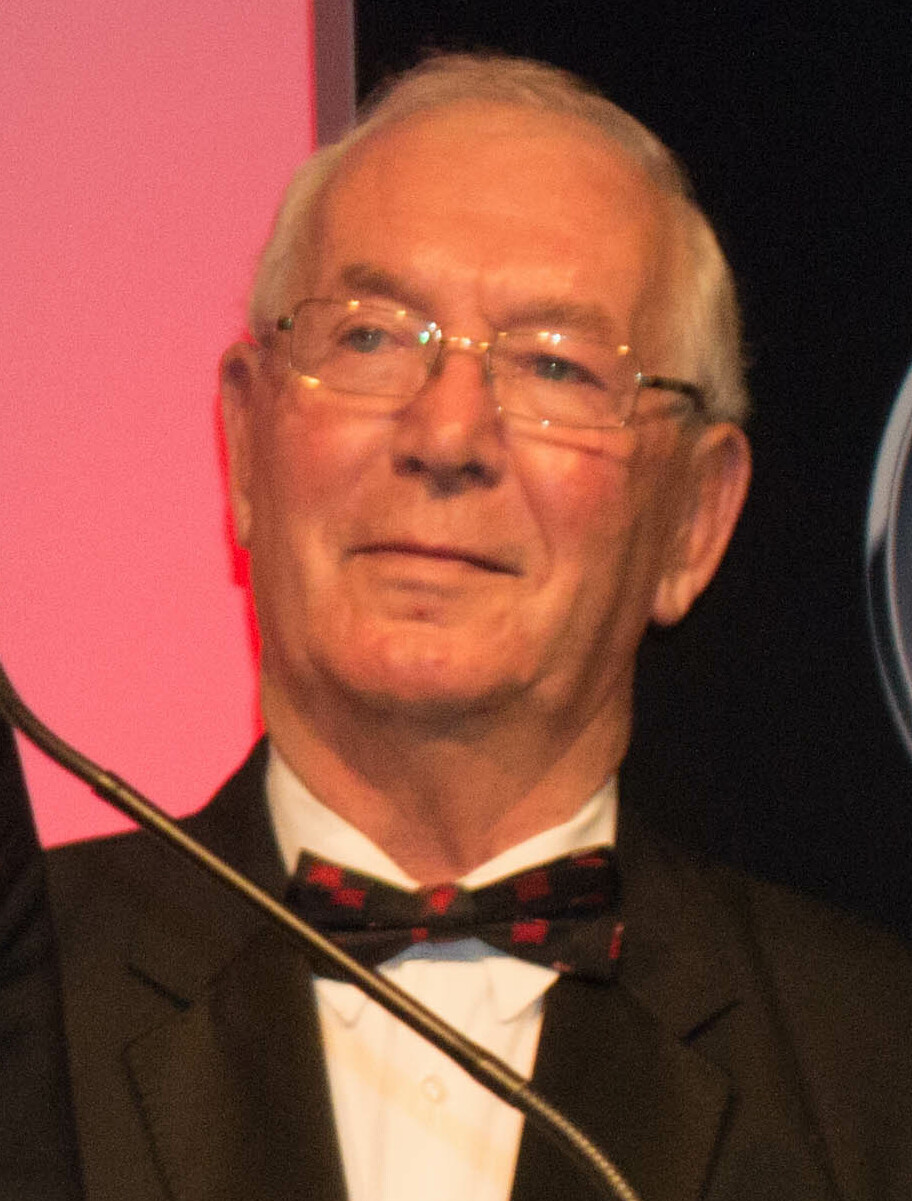
- Born: Sydney John Dawes; 29 June 1940 Abercarn, Monmouthshire, Wales
- Died: 16 April 2021 (aged 80)
- School: Lewis School Pengam
- University: University College of Wales, Aberystwyth; Loughborough College

Rugby union career
- Position: Centre
Amateur team(s)
Years	Team	Apps	(Points)
- Newbridge RFC
–	London Welsh RFC		
–	Leicestershire		
–	Surrey		
–	Middlesex		
–	Barbarian F.C.		
International career
Years	Team	Apps	(Points)
1964–1971	Wales	22	(12)
1971	British Lions	4	(0)

Sydney John Dawes OBE (29 June 1940 – 16 April 2021) was a Welsh rugby union player, playing at centre, and later coach. He captained London Welsh, Wales, the 1971 British Lions and the Barbarians. He is credited with being a major influence in these teams' success, and in the attractive, attacking, free-flowing rugby they played. Dawes also had considerable success as a coach with Wales, and coached the 1977 British Lions. He was appointed an Officer of the Order of the British Empire (OBE) in the 1972 New Year Honours List for services as Lions captain.

== Early life and education ==
Dawes was born in Chapel of Ease, part of Abercarn, near Newbridge, on 29 June 1940. His father was a colliery blacksmith. He was educated at Lewis School Pengam, and later at University College of Wales, Aberystwyth where he earned a degree in chemistry.

He later achieved a PGCE at Loughborough College whilst continuing to play rugby for Newbridge.

By 1964 he had moved to London in support of his wife's ambitions as an opera singer. He worked as a chemistry teacher in Hounslow.

== Rugby playing career ==
=== Club ===
Dawes played club rugby for Newbridge in Monmouthshire.

He then joined London Welsh. Dawes was appointed captain, and effectively also as coach, for the 1965–66 season, leading the club in a period of great success in the late 1960s. He initially significantly increased fitness levels, and then led the club in an open, running, quick-passing, attacking style of rugby, including an overlapping full-back, and relatively skilled forwards. One 1968–69 performance was described by journalist John Reason as "one of the most brilliant exhibitions of club football it has been my privilege to see", and by journalist Terry O'Connor as "the finest display by a club team I can remember", further describing London Welsh "switching attacks with speed and handling skill".

=== International ===
Dawes won his first cap for Wales against Ireland in 1964, and scored an interpassing try at pace. He was selected for Wales' first overseas tour later the same year and played in the Welsh rugby team's first match outside of Europe and its first in the Southern Hemisphere. He played against East Africa in Nairobi on 12 May 1964, Wales winning 26–8. He went on to make 22 appearances for Wales, captaining the side in six of them, including leading the Grand Slam winning side of 1971.

=== British Lions and Barbarians ===
In 1971, Dawes was appointed captain of the British and Irish Lions side for the tour to New Zealand. This side, coached by Carwyn James, became the first and so far the only Lions team to win a series in New Zealand. Colin Meads, New Zealand’s captain, said that Dawes could not be omitted from any contemporary world XV because of his influence on the overall team.

Dawes is one of six captains to lead his side to a test series win on New Zealand soil, along with Philip J. Nel (1937 Springboks), Trevor Allan (1949 Australia), Andrew Slack (1986 Australia), Philippe Saint-André (1994 France) and Johnny Sexton (2022 Ireland). He was honoured as the BBC Wales Sports Personality of the Year at the end of that year.

Dawes was also captain of the Barbarians side that beat New Zealand in Cardiff in 1973.

== Rugby coaching career ==
Dawes acted as a coach, as well as captain, at London Welsh during the late 1960s and early 1970s.

After retiring as a player, Dawes became coach of the Welsh national side in 1974, a post he held until 1979. This was one of the most successful periods in the history of Welsh rugby, with the team winning the Five Nations Championship four times in the five seasons between 1975 and 1979, including two Grand Slams.

Dawes also coached the 1977 British Lions tour to New Zealand, but was unable to repeat the success of 1971. Ian McGeechan has said of this tour "perhaps John, a natural player and leader in his time, was just not so good at putting things across," but others have pointed out that the 1977 Lions nearly drew the series, and that subsequent Lions tours to New Zealand fared much worse.

== Subsequent work and roles ==
In 1972 Dawes moved from teaching to a management post with the North London Polytechnic and then to a property development company. From 1980 to 1990 he worked in the paid role of coaching organiser for the WRU.

Dawes was president of London Welsh RFC and wrote several books on rugby union.

== Personal life ==
Dawes met his wife Janette Morris at university. They had two children and five grandchildren. Both his son Michael and grandson Rhodri played for London Welsh. The marriage ended in the 1980s.

Dawes lived in Llandaff, Cardiff with his partner, Jill Mathias, for nearly 30 years. He enjoyed walking holidays and socialising with old friends.

Dawes died on 16 April 2021 at age 80, of pneumonia. He had been ill for some time, and in hospital since the previous September.
