= Ian Robertson (rugby union, born 1945) =

Scotland international rugby union player & broadcaster

Ian Robertson OBE
- Born: Ian Robertson; 17 January 1945 (age 81) London, England
- Occupation(s): Teacher; Sports broadcaster

Rugby union career
- Position: Fly-half
Amateur team(s)
Years	Team	Apps	(Points)
- Cambridge University
–	Watsonians		
–	London Scottish		
–	Aberdeenshire		
–	Barbarians		
International career
Years	Team	Apps	(Points)
1968–1970	Scotland	8	(9)

Ian Robertson OBE (born 17 January 1945) is a Scottish broadcaster, writer and former international rugby player. He is best known as a rugby union commentator for BBC Radio.

== Early life ==
Robertson was educated at George Watson's College in Edinburgh, Aberdeen University and Christ's College, Cambridge. He worked for four years as an English teacher at Fettes College, where his most famous pupil was Tony Blair.

== Rugby career ==
Robertson played rugby union for Cambridge University, Watsonians, London Scottish, Aberdeenshire, Scotland (1968–70) and the Barbarians. The most memorable moment of his playing career was Scotland's 1970 Calcutta Cup victory over England. At 25 he suffered a serious knee injury that ended his sporting career.

== Journalism ==
Robertson joined the BBC in 1972. and since April 1983 he was the Corporation's official rugby union correspondent, covering the sport not only on radio but also on television. He regards Scotland's 1984 and 1990 Grand Slams and Jonny Wilkinson's winning drop-kick in the final of the 2003 World Cup as his "best on-air moments". Robertson was also a presenter of the English Premiership video review of 1998-99. In February 2018 he announced that he would be retiring at the end of the year and covered his last game, England v Australia, on 24 November 2018.

Robertson is a prolific writer; he has written over 30 books and a number of biographies, including those of Bill Beaumont, Andy Irvine, and actor Richard Burton. His memoir Rugby: Talking a Good Game was published in November 2018 by Hodder & Stoughton.
