= Chris Rea (rugby union) =

Scotland and Lions rugby union player

- Born: Christopher William Wallace Rea; 22 October 1943 (age 83)
- School: High School of Dundee
- University: University of St Andrews

Rugby union career
Senior career
| Years | Team | Apps | (Points) |
- Dundee HSFP
| – | West of Scotland RFC | | |
| – | Headingley FC | | |
International career
| Years | Team | Apps | (Points) |
| 1971 | Scotland | 13 | (9) |
| 1971 | British and Irish Lions | 10 | (9) |

Christopher William Wallace Rea (born 22 October 1943) is a former Scotland international rugby union player. An inside centre and occasional out-half, he made his debut against Australia in November 1968. Rea was capped 13 times for Scotland until 1971, scoring three tries, including the winning try in the 1971 Calcutta Cup. He later contributed to Scottish Rugby's Hall of Fame selection panel and that for World Rugby.

== Early life and clubs ==
Rea was educated at the High School of Dundee and the University of St Andrews, playing for the first team from 1964–1966. He was selected to represent the Scottish Universities in the latter year and captained the team against France. Rea was later inducted into St Andrews Rugby Hall of Fame. He began his club career with West of Scotland. In the late 1960s Rea moved to Leeds, where he joined Headingley FC. One of his team-mates was Ian McGeechan.

== International career ==
Rea played 13 times for his country. In all he scored three international tries, including a vital score away to England at Twickenham in March 1971, which made possible the retention of the Calcutta Cup. He was selected as an injury replacement for the 1971 tour of New Zealand by the British and Irish Lions. While not making the Test team, he played in ten games and scored three tries against provincial teams.

Rea was also selected for the Barbarians, playing twice in 1971.

== Later life ==
He became a sports journalist, working as rugby union correspondent for The Scotsman and The Observer. He moved to the BBC, where he worked for many years covering both rugby and golf. He was later employed by the MCC. Rea joined the IRB as Communications Manager in 2000. He presented Rugby Special from the early 1980s until the mid-1990s and also hosted the BBC's canoeing contest 'Paddles Up' during the 1980s and early 1990s. In 1995 he moved to ITV to commentate on matches in the 1995 World Cup.

Rea was the author of the 1977 book Rugby: A History of Rugby Union Football.

In 1992 Rea was diagnosed with cancer but survived despite being given a very small chance of recovery.

== Notes ==
- Massie, Allan A Portrait of Scottish Rugby (Polygon, Edinburgh; ISBN 0-904919-84-6)
