= 1965–66 Rugby Union County Championship =

English rugby tournament

1965–66 County Championship
- Countries: England
- Champions: Middlesex (5th title)
- Runners-up: Lancashire

The 1965–66 Rugby Union County Championship was the 66th edition of England's premier rugby union club competition at the time.

Middlesex won the competition for the fifth time after defeating Lancashire in the final.

== Final ==
12 March 1966

Lancashire	0–6	Middlesex
		Drop: Thomas, Wilson

St Anthony's Road, Blundellsands
Referee: Mike Titcomb (Gloucestershire)

John Willcox (capt)	Headingley
Ted Rudd	St Helens
Chris Jennins	Waterloo
R Davies	Broughton Park
M Smythe	Broughton Park
Tom Brophy	Liverpool
W R M French	Waterloo
Nick Drake-Lee	Manchester
T Housley	Wigan
M J Hindle	Fylde
Barry Jackson	Broughton Park
A R Trickey	Sale
Dick Greenwood	Waterloo
R F Irving	Liverpool
T Kirchen	Liverpool

Gordon MacDonald (capt)	London Scottish
Sandy Hinshelwood	London Scottish
J Wilson	Bristol
T M Rutter	Westminster Hospital
Hamish Keith	Wasps
R J A Thomas	London Welsh
J H Montgomery	London Scottish
J H Kent	Old Millhillians
Steve Richards	Richmond
B M Stoneman	Richmond
Victor Harding	Harlequins
Chris Ralston	Richmond
J A D Wyness	Saracens
C W Thorburn	Guy's Hospital
George Sherriff	Saracens

== See also ==
- English rugby union system
- Rugby union in England
