= General Williams =

General Williams may refer to:

== United Kingdom ==
- Albert Henry Wilmot Williams (1832–1919), British Army major general
- Aubrey Williams (British Army officer) (1888–1977), British Army major general
- Edward Alexander Wilmot Williams (1910−1994), British Army general
- Fenwick Williams (1800–1883), British Army lieutenant general in the Crimean War
- Guy Williams (British Army officer) (1881–1959), British Army general
- Harold Williams (British Army officer) (1897–1971), British Indian Army lieutenant general
- Owen Williams (British Army officer) (1836–1904), British Army general
- John William Collman Williams (1823–1911), Royal Marines general
- Sydney Frederick Williams (1896–1942), British Army brigadier general

== United States ==
=== U.S. Army ===
- Alpheus S. Williams (1810–1878), Union Army brevet major general
- Arthur E. Williams (born 1938), U.S. Army lieutenant general
- Clarence C. Williams (1869–1958), U.S. Army major general
- Claude A. Williams (fl. 1960s–2000s), U.S. Army major general
- Darrell K. Williams (fl. 1980s–2000s), U.S. Army lieutenant general
- Darryl A. Williams (born 1961), U.S. Army general
- Edward Thomas Williams (1901–1973), U.S. Army lieutenant general
- Harvey D. Williams (1930–2020), U.S. Army major general
- James A. Williams (1932–2017), U.S. Army lieutenant general
- John F. Williams (1887–1953), U.S. Army National Guard major general
- John R. Williams (1782–1854), U.S. Army brigadier general
- Laurin Lyman Williams (1895–1975), U.S. Army lieutenant general
- Nelson G. Williams (1823–1897), Union Army brigadier general
- Paul S. Williams Jr. (1929–1995), U.S. Army lieutenant general
- Robert Williams (adjutant general) (1829–1901), U.S. Army brigadier general
- Robert B. Williams (general) (1901–1977), U.S. Army Air Forces major general in World War II
- Samuel Tankersley Williams (1897–1984), U.S. Army lieutenant general
- Seth Williams (1822–1866), Union Army brevet major general
- Thomas Williams (Union general) (1815–1862), Union Army brigadier general
- Timothy P. Williams (fl. 1980s–2010s), U.S. Army major general

=== U.S. Air Force ===
- Adriel N. Williams (1916–2004), U.S. Air Force brigadier general
- Gordon E. Williams (born 1935), U.S. Air Force major general
- Paul L. Williams (general) (1894–1968), U.S. Army Air Forces and U.S. Air Force general
- R. Scott Williams (fl. 1980s–2010s), U.S. Air Force lieutenant general
- Stephen C. Williams (fl. 1980s–2020s), U.S. Air Force major general

=== U.S. Marine Corps ===
- Dion Williams (1869–1952), U.S. Marine Corps brigadier general
- Gregon A. Williams (1896–1968), U.S. Marine Corps major general
- James L. Williams (fl. 1970s–2010s), U.S. Marine Corps major general
- Michael J. Williams (general) (born 1943), U.S. Marine Corps four-star general
- Peter D. Williams (born 1939), U.S. Marine Corps major general
- Robert H. Williams (soldier) (c. 1908–1983), U.S. Marine Corps brigadier general
- Seth Williams (USMC) (1880–1963), U.S. Marine Corps major general
- Willie Williams (general) (born 1951), U.S. Marine Corps lieutenant general

=== Others ===
- John Williams (Salem, New York) (1752–1806), New York State Militia brigadier general
- John Pugh Williams (c. 1750–1803), North Carolina Militia brigadier general pro tempore in the American Revolutionary War
- John Stuart Williams (1818–1898), Confederate States Army brigadier general
- Otho Holland Williams (1749–1794), Continental Army brigadier general
- Robert Williams (Mississippi politician) (ca. 1770–1836), North Carolina Militia adjutant general

== Others ==
- Thomas Williams (Australian Army officer) (1884–1950), Australian Army master general in World War II
- Victor Williams (general) (1867–1949), Canadian Army major general in World War I

== See also ==
- Attorney General Williams (disambiguation)
