= Peter Williams =

Peter or Pete Williams may refer to:

== Academics ==
- Peter Williams (musicologist) (1937–2016), English musicology professor and Bach scholar
- Peter Williams (educationalist) (born 1948), British educationalist
- Peter Damian Williams (born 1957), Australian historian

== Arts and entertainment ==
- Peter Williams (dance critic) (1914–1995), English ballet critic and writer
- Peter Williams (actor, born 1915) (1915–2003), American-British actor
- Jim Bowen (Peter Williams, 1937–2018), English stand-up comedian
- Peter Williams (painter) (1952–2021), American painter
- Pete Williams (journalist) (born 1952), American journalist and television correspondent
- Peter Williams (broadcaster) (born 1954), New Zealand television presenter
- Peter Williams (actor, born 1957), Jamaican-born actor
- Pete Williams (musician) (born 1960), English musician
- Peter Llewellyn Williams (born 1964), British stage and television actor
- Pete Williams (fl. 2001), creator of the animated sitcom Undergrads
- Pete Williams (director), Australian filmmaker

== Politics and law ==
- Harrison A. Williams (1919–2001), a.k.a. Pete Williams, U.S. senator from New Jersey
- Peter Williams (lawyer) (1934–2015), New Zealand jurist
- Peter Barry Williams (fl. 1980–1984), Commissioner of ICAC, Hong Kong

== Religion ==
- Peter Williams (Welsh Methodist) (1723–1796), leader of Welsh Methodism
- Peter Bailey Williams (1763–1836), Welsh Anglican priest and amateur antiquarian
- Peter Williams Jr. (1780–1840), African-American Episcopal priest

== Science and medicine ==
- Peter Williams (physician) (1925–2014), British physician
- Peter Williams (physicist) (born 1945), British physicist, chairman of Oxford Instruments; chancellor of the University of Leicester
- Peter Francis Williams (active since 1999), Australian astronomer

== Sports ==
=== Australian rules football ===
- Peter Williams (Australian footballer, born 1867) (1867–1949), VFL footballer for Carlton
- Peter Williams (Australian footballer, born 1944), VFL footballer for Fitzroy
- Peter Williams (Australian footballer, born 1957), VFL footballer for Richmond

=== Cricket ===
- Peter Williams (Irish cricketer) (1897–1971), Irish cricketer for Sussex and several other teams in England
- Peter Williams (Australian cricketer) (born 1942), Australian cricketer, played for Victoria
- Peter Williams (South African cricketer) (1957–2014), South African cricketer

=== Other sports ===
- Peter Williams (rugby union, born 1884) (1884–1976), New Zealand rugby union international footballer
- Peter Williams (English footballer) (1931–2021), English footballer
- Peter Williams (motorcyclist) (1939–2020), British motorcycle racer, participant in the Isle of Man TT, 1967
- Peter Williams (rugby, born 1958), English rugby union and rugby league footballer
- Pete Williams (basketball) (born 1965), American professional basketball player
- Peter Williams (footballer, born 1960), Welsh association footballer
- Peter Williams (swimmer) (born 1968), South African swimmer
- Pete Williams (fighter) (born 1975), American mixed martial arts fighter
- Petey Williams (born 1981), Canadian professional wrestler
- Peter Williams (alpine skier) (born 1983), New Zealand para-alpine sit-skier
- Peter Williams (cyclist) (born 1986), British racing cyclist
- Pete Williams (footballer) (born 1954), Welsh football goalkeeping coach and player

== Others ==
- Peter Williams (Medal of Honor) (1831–?), American Civil War sailor
- Peter Gordon Williams (1920–1982), British businessman and unofficial member of the Legislative Council of Hong Kong
- Peter D. Williams (born 1939), United States Marine Corps general and aviator
- Peter Williams (businessman) (born 1974), British businessman, co-founder of Jack Wills clothing brand
- Peter Williams, a character on the television series Titans
