= 1981–82 Rugby Union County Championship =

English rugby union competition

1981–82 Thorn EMI County Championship
- Countries: England
- Champions: Lancashire (12th title)
- Runners-up: North Midlands

The 1981–82 Thorn EMI Rugby Union County Championship was the 82nd edition of England's County Championship rugby union club competition.

Lancashire won their 12th title after defeating North Midlands in the final. The final proved to be Lancashire and England captain Bill Beaumont's last rugby match. Beaumont left the field with concussion following a head injury during the first half and was subsequently advised to retire from playing immediately to avoid the risk of further injury causing permanent damage.

== Second Round ==
Team One	Team Two	Score
North Midlands	Notts, Lincs & Derby	16-13

== Semi finals ==
Date	Venue	Team One	Team Two	Score
28 Nov	Moseley	North Midlands	Middlesex	22–14
28 Nov	Kingsholm	Gloucestershire	Lancashire	16-24

== Final ==
31 January 1982

North Midlands	3–7	Lancashire
Pen: Cusworth		Try: Wright; Pen: O'Brien

The Reddings, Moseley
Referee: J A F Trigg (London)

Ian Metcalfe	Moseley
M Fisken	Moseley
Dave Shorrock	Moseley
Richard Lawson	Moseley
John Goodwin	Moseley
Les Cusworth (capt)	Leicester
Steve Morley	Moseley
Trevor Corless	Moseley
Gary Cox	Moseley
Steve Acaster	Moseley
Bob Barr	Moseley
Richard Tuckwood	Moseley
John Davidson	Moseley
R Sadler	Coventry
Derek Nutt	Moseley
Replacements:
I Bowland	Moseley (for Nutt)

Kevin O'Brien	Broughton Park
John Carleton	Orrell
Tony Wright	Sale
Tony Bond	Sale
Mike Slemen	Liverpool
Peter Williams	Orrell
Steve Smith	Sale
Dave Tabern	Fylde
M Dixon	Fylde
Sammy Southern	Orrell
P H Moss	Orrell
Bill Beaumont (capt)	Fylde
Jim Syddall	Waterloo
Terry Morris	Liverpool
K R Moss	Liverpool
Replacements:
David Cusani	Orrell (for Beaumont)

== See also ==
- English rugby union system
- Rugby union in England
