= 1979–80 Rugby Union County Championship =

English rugby union competition

1979–80 Thorn EMI County Championship
- Countries: England
- Champions: Lancashire (11th title)
- Runners-up: Gloucestershire

The 1979–80 Thorn EMI Rugby Union County Championship was the 80th edition of England's County Championship rugby union club competition.

Lancashire won their 11th title after defeating Gloucestershire in the final.

== First round ==
Pos	Northern Division	P	W	D	L	F	A	Pts
1	Lancashire	5	5	0	0	210	42	10
2	Northumberland	5	4	0	1	109	56	8
3	Yorkshire	5	3	0	2	60	49	6
4	Durham	5	1	1	3	39	101	3
5	Cheshire	5	1	0	4	63	97	2
6	Cumberland & Westmorland	5	0	1	4	31	158	2

Pos	Midlands Group A	P	W	D	L	F	A	Pts
1	North Midlands	2	2	0	0	47	16	4
2	East Midlands	2	1	0	1	27	41	2
3	Notts, Lincs & Derby	2	0	0	2	16	33	0

Pos	Midlands Group B	P	W	D	L	F	A	Pts
1	Warwickshire	2	2	0	0	50	22	4
2	Staffordshire	2	1	0	1	37	36	2
3	Leicestershire	2	0	0	2	24	53	0

Pos	London Group A	P	W	D	L	F	A	Pts
1	Surrey	2	2	0	0	33	29	4
2	Middlesex	2	1	0	1	33	25	2
3	Kent	2	0	0	2	37	49	0

Pos	London Group B	P	W	D	L	F	A	Pts
1	Eastern Counties	3	2	0	1	71	26	4
2	Sussex	3	2	0	1	50	22	4
3	Hampshire	3	1	0	2	25	46	2
4	Hertfordshire	3	1	0	2	22	74	2

Pos	South-West Division	P	W	D	L	F	A	Pts
1	Gloucestershire	3	2	0	1	40	36	4
2	Devon	3	2	0	1	44	40	4
3	Somerset	3	1	1	1	43	40	3
4	Cornwall	3	0	1	2	35	46	1

Pos	Southern Division	P	W	D	L	F	A	Pts
1	Oxfordshire	3	3	0	0	43	18	6
2	Buckinghamshire	3	1	0	2	43	42	2
3	Dorset & Wilts	3	1	0	2	25	39	2
4	Berkshire	3	1	0	2	19	31	2

== Second round ==
Venue	Team One	Team Two	Score
Moseley	North Midlands	Warwickshire	13-7
Woodford	Surrey	Eastern Counties	26-6
Oxford	Oxfordshire	Gloucestershire	10-36

== Semi finals ==
Date	Venue	Team One	Team Two	Score
8 Dec	Moseley	North Midlands	Gloucestershire	17-21
9 Dec	Old Deer Park	Surrey	Lancashire	6-31

== Final ==
9 February 1980

Lancashire	21–15	Gloucestershire
Try: O'Brien, Slemen, Carleton (2); Con: O'Brien; Pen: O'Brien		Try: Pomphrey; Con: Butler; Pen: Bulter (3)

Powderhouse Lane, Vale of Lune
Attendance: 10,000 (estimated)
Referee: Laurie Prideaux (North Midlands)

15	Kevin O'Brien	Broughton Park
14	John Carleton	Orrell
13	Tony Wright	Sale
12	P Phillips	Orrell
11	Mike Slemen	Liverpool
10	Peter Williams	Orrell
9	Steve Smith	Sale
1	Dave Tabern	Fylde
2	Colin Fisher	Waterloo
3	Fran Cotton	Sale
4	Bill Beaumont (capt)	Fylde
5	Jim Syddall	Waterloo
6	Roger Creed	Sale
7	Tony Neary	Broughton Park
8	Laurie Connor	Waterloo
Replacements:
	J Heaton	Orrell
	T S K Aitcheson	Fylde
	D J Carfoot	Waterloo
	T Simon	Sale
	K Pacey	Broughton Park
	T Morris	Liverpool
Coach:
	Des Seabrook

15	Peter Butler	Gloucester
14	Bob Clewes	Gloucester
13	Richard Mogg	Gloucester
12	Alastair Hignell	Bristol
11	Alan Morley	Bristol
10	Dave Sorrell	Bristol
9	Peter Kingston	Gloucester
1	Gordon Sargent	Gloucester
2	Steve Mills	Gloucester
3	Phil Blakeway	Gloucester
4	John Fidler	Gloucester
5	Nigel Pomphrey	Bristol
6	Mike Rafter (capt)	Bristol
7	P A Wood	Gloucester
8	Bob Hesford	Bristol
Replacements:
	M Priddy	Gloucester
	F Reed	Gloucester
	S Boyle	Gloucester
	P Johnson	Clifton
	B Russell	Gloucester
	S Baker	Gloucester

== See also ==
- English rugby union system
- Rugby union in England
