= 1968–69 Rugby Union County Championship =

English rugby union competition

1968–69 County Championship
- Countries: England
- Champions: Lancashire (8th title)
- Runners-up: Cornwall

The 1968–69 Rugby Union County Championship was the 69th edition of England's premier rugby union club competition at the time.

Lancashire won their eighth title after defeating Cornwall in the final.

== Final ==
8 March 1969

Cornwall	9–11	Lancashire
Pen: Harris, George; Drop: Chapman		Try: Lyon, Richards; Con: Jennins; Pen: Jennins

Recreation Ground, Redruth
Attendance: 23-25,000 (estimated)
Referee: R F Johnson (Kent)

15	G Bate (capt)	Penryn
14	Ken Plummer	Bristol & Penryn
13	V C Parkin	Bristol & Penryn
12	G L Jones	United Services Portsmouth
11	Derek Henry Prout	Northampton & Penryn
10	T Palmer	Gloucester & Truro
9	D R Chapman	Hayle
1	Stack Stevens	Penzance-Newlyn
2	R F S Harris	Penryn
3	C R Johns	Redruth
4	Barry Ninnes	St Ives
5	C Kneebone	Penryn
6	W R George	Penryn
7	G R McKeown	Penryn
8	R Hosken	Harlequins & Penryn

15	A Edge	Leigh
14	A A Richards	Fylde
13	David Roughley	Liverpool
12	Christopher Jennins	Waterloo
11	C Hanley	Waterloo
10	P S Mahon	Waterloo
9	E W Williams	New Brighton
1	M J Hindle	Fylde
2	P W Barratt	Broughton Park
3	Barry Jackson	Broughton Park
4	A R Trickey	Sale
5	Mike Leadbetter	Broughton Park
6	Tony Neary	Liverpool U & Broughton Park
7	E Lyon	Waterloo
8	Dick Greenwood (capt)	Waterloo

== See also ==
- English rugby union system
- Rugby union in England
