= General Castle =

General Castle may refer to:

- Fred F. Castle Jr. (fl. 1960s–2000s), U.S. Air Force Reserve brigadier general
- Frederick Walker Castle (1908–1944), U.S. Army Air Forces brigadier general

== See also ==
- John G. Castles (1925–2001), U.S. Army major general
- Attorney General Castle (disambiguation)
