= 1981 Ireland rugby union tour of South Africa =

Summary
P	W	D	L
Total
7	3	0	4
Test match
2	0	0	2
Opponent
P	W	D	L
South Africa
2	0	0	2

Tour chronology
- ← Australia 1979 Japan 1985 →

The 1981 Ireland rugby union tour of South Africa was a series of matches played by the Ireland national rugby union team in South Africa in the May and June 1981. The Irish team played seven matches, of which they won three. They lost the Test Series 2–0 to the Springboks.

== Political context ==
The tour was highly controversial in Europe: the Irish Rugby Football Union defied a worldwide sporting boycott on South Africa and sanctioned the tour, despite condemnation from the anti-apartheid movement and across the political spectrum in Ireland and Britain. Irish Cabinet ministers and the then President of Ireland Patrick Hillery stayed away from Five Nations games in protest while a wire fence was erected around the pitch at the Lansdowne Road stadium.

Four key Irish players — Donal Spring, Hugo MacNeill, Tony Ward and Moss Keane — refused to travel.

The first test match, and the 99th played by South Africa, was historic. The Springboks sported white shirts in deference to the Irish. However it was the presence of the coloured player Erroll George Tobias in a Springbok shirt, rather than the close scoreline, which made the international headlines on the day. He was the first coloured player to appear in an international for the Republic of South Africa.

== Matches ==
Scores and results list Ireland's points tally first.

Opposing team	For	Against	Date	Venue
South African Gazelles	15	18	16 May 1981	Loftus Versfeld, Pretoria
South African Mining Invitation XV	46	7	20 May 1981	Olën Park, Potchefstroom
President's Trophy XV	54	3	23 May 1981	Kings Park Stadium, Durban
South African Country Districts 'B'	16	17	26 May 1981	Boland Stadium, Wellington
South Africa	15	23	30 May 1981	Newlands, Cape Town
Gold Cup XV	51	10	2 June 1981	Oudtshoorn
South Africa	10	12	6 June 1981	Kings Park Stadium, Durban

Ireland embarked on their first tour to South Africa after a twenty-year absence on the back of a five nations championship which they were widely considered to be favourites to win but ended with four defeats, having lost all their matches for the first time since 1977. Despite condemnation from political and ecclesiastical sources, the IRFU honoured their promise to undertake a seven match tour against multiracial sides and included twelve uncapped players as well as half a dozen former British and Irish Lions in the touring party. A number of players had resigned their posts when employers declined to grant leave of absence for the tour whilst others had no option but to simply declare their unavailability.

Of the seven matches played, the majority including both test matches were lost. Injuries to two key players proved difficult to overcome. John Robbie (later to become a non-capped Springbok) injured a shoulder in the first half of the opening fixture and only gained match fitness in the last few days of the tour whilst Ollie Campbell only played twice on tour, his replacement Mick Quinn having last played international rugby in March 1977.

Ahead of the Gazelles' fixture (the SA U-24 side), much had been made of the attacking potential of the Irish three-quarters, yet on the day the only points Ireland scored in front of a 35,000 crowd were through the boot of Kevin O'Brien as the tourists were outplayed in the line-out through the work of lock Skinner. There was nothing particularly undersized about the under-24 side featuring a number of future Springboks in their ranks including Jannie Breedt, the 21 stone Flippie van der Merwe and Piet Kruger as props and 6'9" Vleis Visagie at lock. Future Springbok coach Carel du Plessis scored one try from the wing playing alongside SARFF's Wilfred Cupido, one of four coloured players included in the list of the sixty-four trialists ahead of the three test series in New Zealand later on in the year.

The second fixture played at Olën Park saw Ireland take on fairly underwhelming opposition in the guise of the Gold Mining Invitation XV. Solomon Mhlaba, a tourist to the UK with the 1979 SA Baa Baas, started at full back for the GMI. However, he saw little of the ball to demonstrate his attacking prowess as Ireland ran in seven tries with John Murphy contributing a total of eighteen points via his boot from fullback.

=== First test ===
The first test was held at Newlands on 30 May. There were first caps for Murphy, Paul Dean and Jerry Holland at Newlands, a game which Ireland could undoubtedly have won, matching the Springbok pack in all phases of the game, but they were seriously undermined and derailed by injuries to both Murphy and Campbell, which ultimately ruled both players out for the remainder of the tour.

Erroll Tobias, at centre, was the first coloured player ever selected for the Springboks. Tobias was in a midfield pairing with Danie Gerber. A crowd of 37,000 watched as Tobias broke, then gave an inside pass to Rob Louw, who scored. Prior to the test Danie Craven warned Tobias that the game would be over before he would even realize that he was representing his country. The Springboks defeated the Irish 23–15, with Danie Gerber scoring one of the best tries ever seen at Newlands, Tobias recalled.

=== Second test ===
The Irish pack simply surpassed themselves throughout the second test at Kings Park with the back row of O'Driscoll, Slattery and Duggan quite magnificent as the bigger Springbok pack were outplayed in every phase of the game. Holding a 7–6 half time lead courtesy of a searing try from full back O'Brien and a Quinn penalty to a Botha drop goal and penalty, another Quinn penalty extended the lead out to 10–6. Yet a further two Botha drop goals were to deprive Ireland of their glory, as he became only the fourth player in history to drop three goals in a test, his final effort being only minutes from the end of the game.

== Touring party ==
- Manager: P. Madigan
- Assistant Manager: Tom Kiernan
- Medical Officer: Dr. Malcolm Little (UCG RFC)
- Captain: Fergus Slattery (Blackrock College)

=== Full backs ===
John Murphy* (Greystones); K A O'Brien (Broughton Park)

=== Three-quarters ===
Freddie McLennan (Wanderers); Keith Crossan* (Instonians); David Irwin (Queen's University); A W Irwin* (Queens' University): John Hewitt*(NIFC); Michael Kiernan* (Lansdowne); Terry Kennedy (St. Mary's College)

=== Half-backs ===
Paul Dean* (St.Mary's College); Ollie Campbell (Old Belvedere) [rep: Mick Quinn (Lansdowne)]; John Robbie (Greystones) [rep: J B O'Connor* (Palmerston)] Robbie McGrath (Wanderers)

=== Forwards ===
Phil Orr (Old Wesley); John Cantrell (UCD); Harry Harbison* (UCD); Gerry McLoughlin (Shannon); Des Fitzgerald* (Lansdowne); Brendan Foley (Shannon); Jerry Holland *(Cork Constitution); G H Wallace* (Old Wesley); John O'Driscoll (London Irish); Fergus Slattery (Blackrock College); Ronan Kearney* (Wanderers); Willie Duggan (Blackrock College); A F O'Leary* (Cork Constitution)

- = selected as a previously uncapped tourist

== See also ==
- Ireland vs South Africa at rugby union
