= Carroll Thackston =

United States Army general

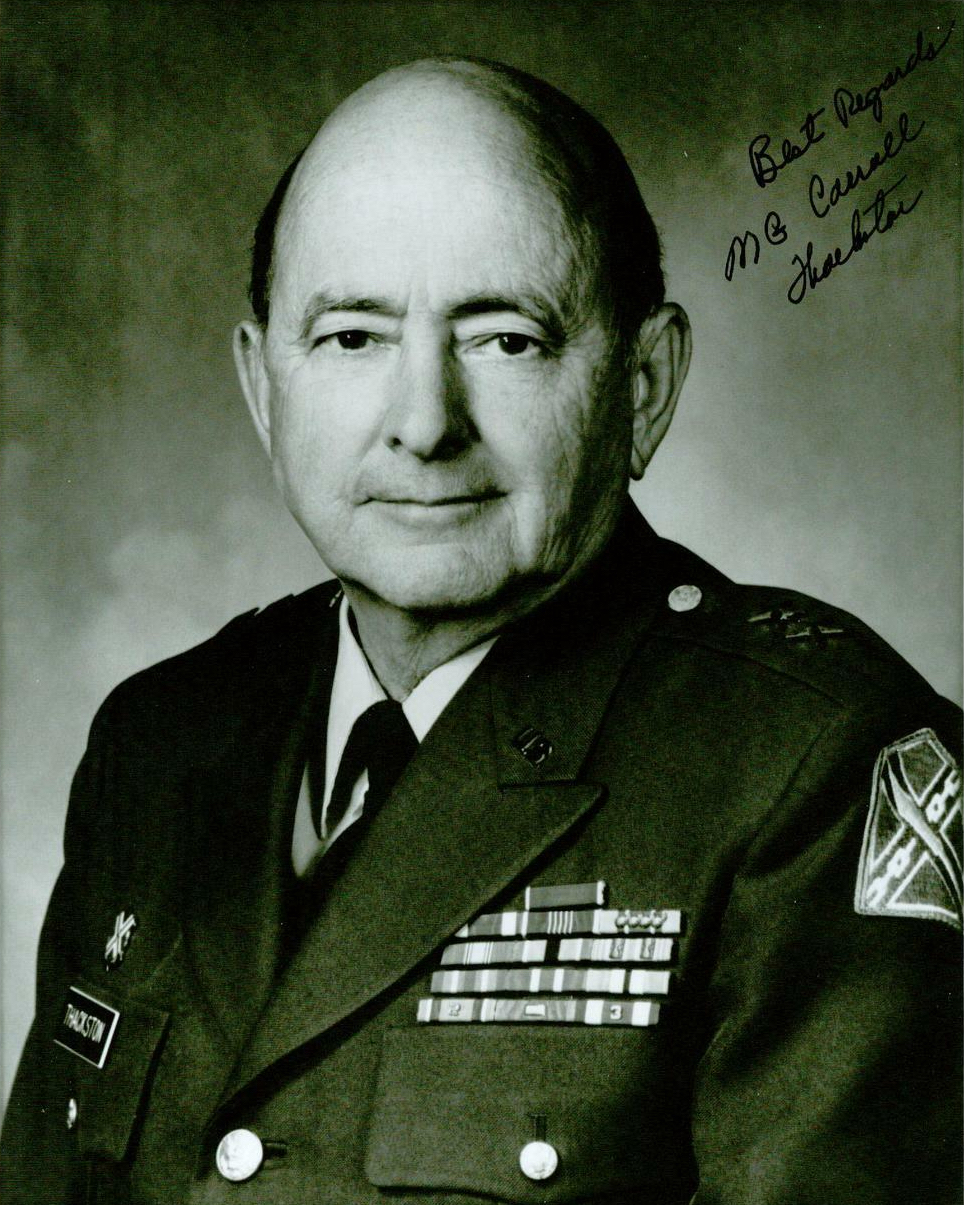

24th Adjutant General of Virginia
- In office July 24, 1994 – September 30, 1998
- Governor: George Allen; Jim Gilmore
- Preceded by: Jack Castles
- Succeeded by: Claude Williams

Personal details
- Born: June 20, 1933 Concord, Virginia, U.S.
- Died: February 17, 2013 (aged 79) Lynchburg, Virginia, U.S.
- Spouse: Frances Anne LaNeave (m. 1959)
- Education: Virginia Military Institute

Military service
- Allegiance: United States
- Branch/service: United States Army
- Years of service: 1955–1998
- Rank: Major general
- Unit: National Guard Bureau
- Commands: Virginia National Guard
- Awards: Legion of Merit

Carroll Thackston (June 20, 1933 – February 17, 2013) was a United States Army major general and former Adjutant General of Virginia.

== Early life and education ==
Thackston was born on June 20, 1933, in Concord, Virginia, to Mr. and Mrs. Richard M. Thackston. He attended Virginia Military Institute and graduated in 1955 with a degree in history.

== Dates of promotion ==
- 2LT USAR 7 Jun 55
- 1LT USAR 6 Jun 58
- 1LT ARNG 22 Apr 63
- CPT ARNG 27 Jan 70
- MAJ ARNG 4 Aug 65
- LTC ARNG 11 Jun 76
- COL ARNG 24 Nov 82
- BG (AGC) ARNG 15 Sep 89
- MG (AGC) ARNG 22 Jun 95
