= Fred Castle =

Fred Castle may refer to:

- Fred Castle (cricketer) (1909–1997), English cricketer
- Fred Castle (footballer) (1902– after 1930), Welsh footballer
- Fred F. Castle Jr., United States Air Force general

== See also ==
- Frederick Walker Castle (1908–1944), United States Army Air Forces general
- Frederick Castle (footballer) (1898–1974), English footballer
