= Daniel E. Long Jr. =

United States Army general

Chip Long
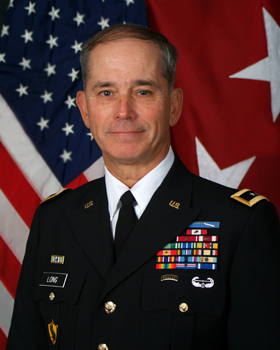

27th Adjutant General of Virginia
- In office July 14, 2010 – June 1, 2014
- Governor: Bob McDonnell; Terry McAuliffe
- Preceded by: Robert Newman
- Succeeded by: Tim Williams

Personal details
- Born: Daniel Eugene Long Jr.
- Education: Liberty University; U.S. Army War College

Military service
- Allegiance: United States
- Branch/service: United States Army
- Years of service: 1967–2014
- Rank: Major general
- Unit: National Guard Bureau
- Commands: Virginia National Guard

Daniel Eugene Long Jr. is a retired United States Army major general and former Adjutant General of Virginia.

== Military career ==
=== Dates of rank ===
Promotions
Rank	Date
Major general	November 19, 2002
Brigadier general	May 21, 1998
Colonel	April 26, 1993
Lieutenant colonel	March 1, 1986
Major	January 10, 1979
Captain	December 14, 1973
First lieutenant	September 25, 1970
Second lieutenant	September 26, 1967
