= Tidewater Community College =

Public college in South Hampton Roads, Virginia, USS

Coordinates: 36.850109°N 76.291333°W

- Motto: From here, go anywhere
- Type: Public community college
- Established: February 4, 1968; 58 years ago
- President: Marcia Conston
- Faculty: 294 (full-time faculty)
- Students: 16,195 (fall 2022)
- Undergraduates: 34,000
- Location: Chesapeake, Norfolk, Portsmouth, Suffolk and Virginia Beach, Virginia, United States
- Campus: Urban, Suburban
- Colors: Blue, White
- Nickname: TCC
- Mascot: Storm
- Website: tcc.edu

Tidewater Community College (TCC) is a public community college in South Hampton Roads, Virginia, with campuses in Chesapeake, Norfolk, Portsmouth, Suffolk, and Virginia Beach. It is part of the Virginia Community College System and is accredited by the Southern Association of Colleges and Schools Commission on Colleges to award the associate degree.

== History ==
The school was founded in 1968, when a local philanthropist, Fred W. Beazley, closed the existing Frederick College and deeded the land to the Commonwealth of Virginia for the creation of Tidewater Community College. With the support of Hampton Roads' municipalities, TCC quickly expanded to Virginia Beach and Chesapeake, and in the 1990s, it helped revitalize downtown Norfolk by establishing a campus in former department store buildings. In 2010, the Portsmouth campus relocated to a new site within the city.

In 2003 TCC signed an agreement with Norfolk State University that allows students to transfer from one to another.

In 2017, Tidewater Community College (Virginia Beach and Norfolk campuses) entered into an agreement with Virginia Wesleyan University on the "Tidewater Promise," a parallel concurrent enrollment program that permits students to take advantage of most services and resources on the VWU campus while enrolled as associate degree students at TCC. The program enables students to guarantee tuition costs for four years and to complete a four-year bachelor's degree less expensively than attending a state university.

Edna V. Baehre-Kolovani took office as the college's fifth president in July 2012. She succeeded Deborah M. DiCroce, who had served for 14 years. In early 2018, the college's faculty voted "no confidence" in Baehre-Kolovani as enrollments declined and the college announced another round of layoffs (following layoffs in 2017).

Tidewater Community College's mascot is Storm and the school colors are royal blue and white.

== Literary festival and journal ==
Tidewater Community College publishes an annual literary journal called the Channel Marker. Submissions are accepted in the fall semester and the publication is released in the spring (usually April) in conjunction with TCC's Annual Literary Festival.

== Notable alumni ==
- Roy Cooper, member of the West Virginia House of Delegates
- John Cosgrove, member of the Virginia Senate
- Cecil Lewis, indoor soccer midfielder
- Kevin Newsome, college football quarterback
- Jay Pharoah, stand-up comedian and actor
- Chris Richardson, singer-songwriter
- Winsome Earle-Sears, 42nd Lieutenant Governor of Virginia
- Terrie Suit, 1st Virginia Secretary of Veterans Affairs
- Rachel Ventura, member of the Illinois Senate
