= Robert B. Newman Jr. =

United States Air Force general

Robert Newman
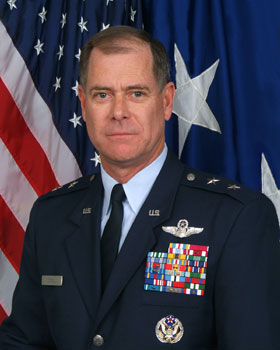

26th Adjutant General of Virginia
- In office January 14, 2006 – July 14, 2010
- Governor: Tim Kaine; Bob McDonnell
- Preceded by: Claude Williams
- Succeeded by: Chip Long

Personal details
- Born: Robert Burton Newman Jr.
- Education: Virginia Military Institute; Webster University; Air War College

Military service
- Allegiance: United States
- Branch/service: United States Air Force
- Years of service: 1973–2010
- Rank: Major general
- Unit: National Guard Bureau
- Commands: Virginia National Guard

Robert Burton Newman Jr. is a retired United States Air Force major general and former Adjutant General of Virginia.

== Military career ==
=== Dates of rank ===
Promotions
Rank	Date
Major general	March 1, 2007
Brigadier general	July 10, 2004
Colonel	March 30, 2000
Lieutenant colonel	October 1, 1994
Major	May 19, 1987
Captain	November 24, 1977
First lieutenant	November 24, 1975
Second lieutenant	June 6, 1973
