= Tony Bond (rugby union) =

English rugby union player (1953–2025)

- Born: Anthony Matthew Bond; 3 August 1953 Urmston, Manchester, England
- Died: December 2025 (aged 72)

Rugby union career
- Position: Centre
Senior career
Years	Team	Apps	(Points)
- Broughton Park
- Sale
1979	North of England		
International career
Years	Team	Apps	(Points)
1978–1982	England	6	(0)

Anthony Matthew Bond (3 August 1953 – December 2025) was an English rugby union international who represented the national team from 1978 to 1982.

== Background ==
Bond was born on 3 August 1953 in Urmston, Manchester, England. He died in December 2025 at the age of 72.

== Rugby union career ==
Bond started his rugby career playing for Broughton Park and moved to Sale during the 1977–78 season. He toured Canada with the England Under-23 team in May 1977 and scored tries in both internationals against the Canada senior team. He made his international debut on 25 November 1978 at Twickenham in the England vs New Zealand match. Of the six matches he played for his national side he was only on the winning side on one occasion, and the four defeats including two to Ireland and two to New Zealand. He played his final match for England on 6 February 1982 at Twickenham in the England vs Ireland match.

He was a member of the famous North team which beat the All Blacks at Otley on 17 November 1979. He was one of four current or past Broughton Park players in this side and was joined by former teammates Tony Neary, Kevin O'Brien and Jim Syddall in the second row.
