= Claude A. Williams =

United States Army general

Claude Williams
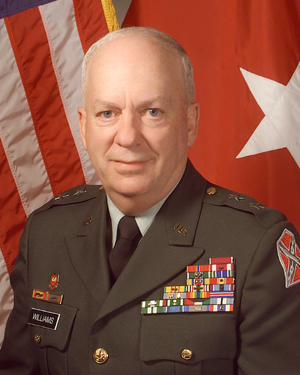

25th Adjutant General of Virginia
- In office October 1, 1998 – January 14, 2006
- Governor: Jim Gilmore; Mark Warner
- Preceded by: Carroll Thackston
- Succeeded by: Robert Newman

Personal details
- Born: Claude Alan Williams
- Education: Virginia Tech; Naval War College

Military service
- Allegiance: United States
- Branch/service: United States Army
- Years of service: 1969–2006
- Rank: Major general
- Unit: National Guard Bureau
- Commands: Virginia National Guard
- Battles/wars: Vietnam War
- Awards: Legion of Merit; Bronze Star Medal

Claude Alan Williams is a retired United States Army major general and former Adjutant General of Virginia.

== Military career ==
Promotions
Rank	Date
Major general	March 21, 2002
Brigadier general	February 7, 2001
Colonel	July 12, 1995
Lieutenant colonel	January 26, 1988
Major	October 5, 1983
Captain	June 13, 1975
First lieutenant	June 11, 1971
Second lieutenant	June 8, 1969
