= Glenn R. Croshaw =

American politician (1950–2021)

Member of the Virginia House of Delegates from the 81st district
- In office January 1987 – January 12, 2000
- Preceded by: Owen B. Pickett
- Succeeded by: Terrie Suit

Personal details
- Born: Glenn Randall Croshaw; July 4, 1950 Petersburg, Virginia, U.S.
- Died: May 14, 2021 (aged 70)
- Party: Democratic
- Spouse: Kendra Menefee
- Education: East Carolina University; University of Virginia
- Occupation: Judge

Glenn Randall Croshaw (July 4, 1950 – May 14, 2021) was an American politician. A Democrat, he was a member of the Virginia House of Delegates District 81, from 1986 to 1999.

== Birth and Education ==
Croshaw was born on July 4, 1950, in Petersburg, Virginia. He attended East Carolina University where he received his BS/BA Degree in 1972. He later attended University of Virginia Law School where he earned a J.D. degree in law in 1975. He was married to Kendra Menefee. He was a member of the Methodist Church.

== Business career ==
Croshaw worked for a number of years as an Attorney at Wilcox and Savage and a senior affiliated consultant at Kemper Consulting before he was appointed to be a Judge of the Virginia Beach Circuit Court in July 2011.

== Political career ==
Croshaw was a member of the Virginia House of Delegates from 1986 to 1999, representing the 81st district, which consisted of parts of the cities of Virginia Beach and Chesapeake. He was defeated for re-election by Terrie Suit in 1999. Croshaw received 4,922 votes and Suit received 5,295 votes, even though Croshaw out-spent Suit $418,240 to $388,494. Croshaw had run unopposed in the 1997 House election and received 8,672 votes.
