= Terrie Suit =

American politician and businesswoman

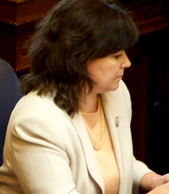

1st Virginia Secretary of Veterans Affairs
- In office April 6, 2011 – September 23, 2013
- Governor: Bob McDonnell
- Preceded by: None (position created)
- Succeeded by: James W. Hopper

Member of the Virginia House of Delegates from the 81st district
- In office January 12, 2000 – October 12, 2008
- Preceded by: Glenn R. Croshaw
- Succeeded by: Barry Knight

Personal details
- Born: October 3, 1964 (age 62) Orléans, France
- Party: Republican
- Spouse: Thomas F. Suit
- Education: Tidewater Community College; Old Dominion University; University of Mary Washington
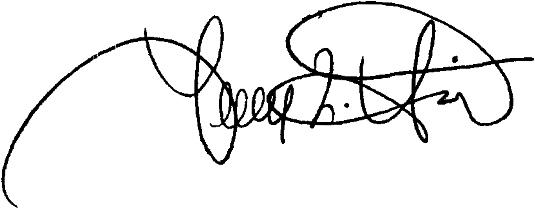
- Signature

Terrie L. Suit (born October 3, 1964 in Orléans, France) is an American politician and businesswoman. A Republican, she was a member of the Virginia House of Delegates from 2000 to 2008. In April 2011, she became the state's first Secretary of Veterans Affairs and Homeland Security, a position she held until September 2013.

== Life and education ==
Suit attended Tidewater Community College where she received her associate degree. She later attended Old Dominion University where she earned a B.S. degree in political science.

Suit returned to Tidewater Community College in the spring of 2007 to give the graduation commencement address to the class of 2007. She is a Presbyterian.

== Business career ==
Suit worked for a number of years in banking and finance as both an NASD licensed representative and as a mortgage loan officer.

Suit was a member of numerous civic organizations in the Hampton Roads area including the Chesapeake Farm Bureau, Hampton Roads Chamber of Commerce, South Hampton Roads BRAC Working Group and Virginia Republican Party State Central Committee. Suit has also won numerous awards including the John Marshall Award, the Hampton Roads Outstanding Professional Woman in Public Service, Virginia Women's Attorneys’ Association, Advocacy Award of Excellence and YWCA, Woman of Distinction.

== Political career ==
Suit was a member of the Virginia House of Delegates from 2000 to 2008, representing the 81st district, which consisted of parts of the cities of Virginia Beach and Chesapeake. She was chair of the General Laws committee and Deputy House Whip in the 2008 session.

On September 9, 2008, Suit announced her retirement from the House, effective October 12. She cited the retirement of her husband, Tom, from the United States Navy, as influencing her own decision.

While Suit's initial plan was to join the government affairs team at the law firm Williams Mullen, she left the firm after one year to join the Cabinet of newly elected Governor Robert F. McDonnell, where she served initially as his Assistant for Commonwealth Preparedness, Senior Advisor on Military Relations, and Liaison to the Department of Homeland Security, and later as the Secretary of Veterans Affairs and Homeland Security.
