= History of rugby union matches between Ireland and South Africa =

The Ireland and South Africa rugby union teams have a rivalry dating back to 1906. The Springboks dominated their early meetings, with the Irish winning just once against South Africa prior to 2004, but results have since turned in Ireland's favour. Since the return of the Springboks to international rugby post-Apartheid, the record over 22 matches stands 12–10 to South Africa. Additionally, Ireland have won ten of the last sixteen test matches since they met during the 2004 Autumn internationals. Following Ireland's tour win over New Zealand in 2022, South Africa are the only major Southern Hemisphere team over which Ireland has not achieved a series victory; although, in 2024 the two sides shared a series in South Africa 1-1.

The 2023 group stage matchup marked the first ever Rugby World Cup meeting between the two sides and first meeting on neutral soil. This was also the first occasion in which the world number one (Ireland) and world number two (South Africa) teams as per World Rugby Rankings, had ever met at the pool stages of a Rugby World Cup. Ireland prevailed 13–8 over South Africa.

Along with New Zealand, South Africa and Ireland have dominated the top rankings spot in the World Rugby international men's rankings since the mid-2010s. Meetings between any two of these three teams have been considered significant events in global rugby. Recent matches between South Africa and Ireland, have been close and physical affairs with only two of the ten matches since 2016 decided by more than a single score apart. The rivalry has been augmented by the inclusion of South African clubs in the United Rugby Championship in which Irish and South African sides are habitually the most competitive.

== 2004 Ireland rugby union tour of South Africa ==
Ireland travelled to South Africa in June 2004, having won their first Triple Crown since 1985, and beaten the champions of the 2003 Rugby World Cup, England in their first home game since the final. As a result, the Irish manager, Eddie O'Sullivan, was confident that Ireland would achieve their first win over South Africa in 39 years, their only previous victory having come in Dublin in 1965.

By contrast, South Africa had just changed their coach to Jake White and he had radically changed the team for his first test since taking charge of the Springboks. The first of the two game test series was played at altitude in Bloemfontein and South Africa eventually won the match 31–17, despite the scores being level at 11-all at half time.

The second match was played in the Newlands Stadium in Cape Town, and was a closer affair. However, South Africa maintained their unbeaten record against Ireland on home soil by winning 26–17.

== 2004 Autumn Internationals ==
The two teams were to meet again in November 2004 when South Africa toured the UK and Ireland, playing each of the home nations. In the lead-up to the match, South African coach Jake White provided additional motivation to the Irish team by publicly repeating his statement from earlier in the year that "only three Irish players would be good enough to get onto the South African team".

The game's only try was scored in controversial circumstances by Irish fly-half Ronan O'Gara. In the 21st minute, New Zealand referee Paul Honiss awarded Ireland a penalty inside the South African 22 and told John Smit to go and talk to his players regarding their repeated infringements at the break-down. While Smit's back was turned and the Springbok players were being called into a huddle, O'Gara took a quick tap and ran in for five points. John Smit protested but the try stood. O'Gara missed the conversion, but was to make up for it with a drop goal from 35 meters 12 minutes later. Percy Montgomery put the first points on the board for South Africa on 26 minutes, but missed a second effort shortly afterwards. Ireland led 8–3 at the break.

O'Gara continued his success with the boot three minutes after the start of the second half with a penalty to stretch the Irish lead to 11–3. Montgomery quickly responded in kind, but shortly afterwards Schalk Burger was sin-binned for the second week in a row, which allowed Ronan O'Gara to increase the Irish lead to 14–6. A late tackle on Irish skipper Brian O'Driscoll allowed O'Gara to increase the margin between the teams to 17–6. Percy Montgomery landed two more penalties, but Ireland hung on to win only their second victory over the Springboks, 17–12.

John Smit claims that Paul Honiss approached him after the match to apologise for the mistake regarding Ronan O'Gara's try. A few months after the incident Paul Honiss apologised publicly on South African radio for his mistake.

== 2006 Autumn Internationals ==
On Saturday, 11 November 2006, the Springboks came to Lansdowne Road with an experimental side, including three debutants in the back three. The team was selected by head coach Jake White as a way of blooding players for the 2007 Rugby World Cup, and South Africa's urgent need to develop new players in the lead up to that tournament. By contrast, Ireland's coach, Eddie O'Sullivan chose Ireland's strongest available team, hoping to take a prized southern hemisphere scalp and boost his team's morale.

The day of the match was a clear, wintry day, but as the late kick off time of 5pm approached, the infamous 'swirling winds of Lansdowne Road' began to blow. South Africa won the toss and chose to play into the wind in the first half, starting the game with a fine display of running rugby. On their first visit to the Irish half, they returned with points as their out half André Pretorius kicked a penalty into the wind. The Irish responded with a barging run by Denis Leamy who made the hard yards before passing to Ronan O'Gara, who then passed back inside to Andrew Trimble who found his way over for Ireland's first points.

From there, Ireland scored two more tries and ended the first half 22–3 ahead. South Africa played better in the second half and debutant winger François Steyn showed good pace to score in the corner, but Pretorius failed to convert the try. Bryan Habana who usually plays at winger, but who played this match in the position of outside center, showed his speed and guile by scoring a remarkable solo try. Any thoughts of a South African revival were stamped out when Girvan Dempsey set up Shane Horgan for a try in the 76th minute. Ronan O'Gara scored the last points of the match with the conversion for a final score of 32–15.

For the 2006 November Test against Ireland the Springboks wore an exact replica of the jersey that was worn by the touring side captained by Paul Roos in 1906. It was on this tour that the name 'Springboks' was coined. The kit consisted of a green jersey with a white collar, blue shorts and blue socks. Sponsors Sasol did not appear on the jersey. The strip was a part of South African rugby's centenary celebrations.

== 2010 Autumn International ==
The teams' meeting on 6 November 2010 was the first Ireland test at their new home of Aviva Stadium, where Ireland lost 23–21.

== 2016 Ireland tour of South Africa ==
In 2016, Ireland achieved their first test victory against the Springboks in South Africa with a 26–20 victory in Cape Town.

== 2023 Rugby World Cup meeting ==
The two teams' first meeting at the Rugby World Cup took place in the pool stage of the 2023 edition on 23 September at the Stade de France in Saint-Denis. The fixture, largely considered to be a decider as to who would win the pool and the number one spot in the world ranking, was won by Ireland, 8–13. Ireland then relinquished the number 1 spot when they were knocked out by New Zealand in the Quarter Finals. Meanwhile, South Africa went on to win the World Cup.

== 2024 Ireland rugby union tour of South Africa ==
During the 2024 mid year rugby union tests, Ireland claimed their second ever test win on South African soil and split the test series 1–1 with the Springboks following a deep, match-winning drop goal from Ciarán Frawley as time expired in the second test.

== Summary ==
=== Overall ===
Details	Played	Won by Ireland	Won by South Africa	Drawn	Ireland points	South Africa points
In Ireland	19	8	10	1	287	306
In South Africa	12	2	10	0	190	308
Neutral venue	1	1	0	0	13	8
Overall	32	11	20	1	490	622

=== Records ===
Note: Date shown in brackets indicates when the record was or last set.

Record	Ireland	South Africa
Longest winning streak	3 (13 November 2004 – 28 November 2009; 11 November 2017 – 6 July 2024)	8 (30 May 1981 – 23 September 2003)
Largest points for
Home	38 (11 November 2017)	37 (13 June 1998)
Away	26 (11 June 2016; 18 June 2016)	38 (30 November 1912)
Neutral	13 (23 September 2023)	8 (23 September 2023)
Largest winning margin
Home	35 (11 November 2017)	33 (20 June 1998)
Away	6 (11 June 2016)	38 (30 November 1912)
Neutral	5 (23 September 2023)	—N/a
Largest aggregate score
58; South Africa 32–26 Ireland (18 June 2016)

=== Attendance ===
Up to date as of 22 November 2026

Total attendance	1,400,521
Average attendance	43,766
Highest attendance	78,750; South Africa 8–13 Ireland (23 September 2023)

== Results ==
No.	Date	Venue	Score	Winner	Competition	Attendance	Ref.
1	24 November 1906	Balmoral Showgrounds, Belfast	12–15	South Africa	1906–07 South Africa tour of Europe	15,000	
2	30 November 1912	Lansdowne Road, Dublin	0–38	South Africa	1912–13 South Africa tour of Europe	20,000	
3	19 December 1931	Lansdowne Road, Dublin	3–8	South Africa	1931–32 South Africa tour of Great Britain and Ireland	35,000	
4	8 December 1951	Lansdowne Road, Dublin	5–17	South Africa	1951–52 South Africa tour of Europe	47,000	
5	17 December 1960	Lansdowne Road, Dublin	3–8	South Africa	1960–61 South Africa tour of Europe	40,000	
6	13 May 1961	Newlands Stadium, Cape Town	24–8	South Africa	1961 Ireland tour of South Africa	35,000	
7	10 April 1965	Lansdowne Road, Dublin	9–6	Ireland	1965 South Africa tour of Scotland and Ireland	30,000	
8	10 January 1970	Lansdowne Road, Dublin	8–8	draw	1969–70 South Africa tour of Great Britain and Ireland	28,000	
9	30 May 1981	Newlands Stadium, Cape Town	23–15	South Africa	1981 Ireland tour of South Africa	37,000	
10	6 June 1981	Kings Park Stadium, Durban	12–10	South Africa	1981 Ireland tour of South Africa	38,600	
11	13 June 1998	Free State Stadium, Bloemfontein	37–13	South Africa	1998 Ireland tour of South Africa	26,000	
12	20 June 1998	Loftus Versfeld Stadium, Pretoria	33–0	South Africa	1998 Ireland tour of South Africa	34,850	
13	28 November 1998	Lansdowne Road, Dublin	13–27	South Africa	1998 South Africa tour of Great Britain and Ireland	48,000	
14	19 November 2000	Lansdowne Road, Dublin	18–28	South Africa	2000 Autumn International	50,000	
15	12 June 2004	Free State Stadium, Bloemfontein	31–17	South Africa	2004 Ireland tour of South Africa	37,243	
16	19 June 2004	Newlands Stadium, Cape Town	26–17	South Africa	2004 Ireland tour of South Africa	45,000	
17	13 November 2004	Lansdowne Road, Dublin	17–12	Ireland	2004 Autumn International	48,500	
18	11 November 2006	Lansdowne Road, Dublin	32–15	Ireland	2006 Autumn International	43,000	
19	28 November 2009	Croke Park, Dublin	15–10	Ireland	2009 Autumn International	74,950	
20	6 November 2010	Aviva Stadium, Dublin	21–23	South Africa	2010 Autumn International	35,517	
21	10 November 2012	Aviva Stadium, Dublin	12–16	South Africa	2012 Autumn International	49,781	
22	8 November 2014	Aviva Stadium, Dublin	29–15	Ireland	2014 Autumn International	51,100	
23	11 June 2016	Newlands Stadium, Cape Town	20–26	Ireland	2016 Ireland tour of South Africa	42,640	
24	18 June 2016	Ellis Park Stadium, Johannesburg	32–26	South Africa	2016 Ireland tour of South Africa	58,400	
25	25 June 2016	Nelson Mandela Bay Stadium, Port Elizabeth	19–13	South Africa	2016 Ireland tour of South Africa	42,324	
26	11 November 2017	Aviva Stadium, Dublin	38–3	Ireland	2017 Autumn International	51,700	
27	5 November 2022	Aviva Stadium, Dublin	19–16	Ireland	2022 Autumn International	51,700	
28	23 September 2023	Stade de France, Saint-Denis, France	8–13	Ireland	2023 Rugby World Cup	78,750	
29	6 July 2024	Loftus Versfeld Stadium, Pretoria	27–20	South Africa	2024 Ireland tour of South Africa	50,066	
30	13 July 2024	Kings Park Stadium, Durban	24–25	Ireland	2024 Ireland tour of South Africa	52,000	
31	22 November 2025	Aviva Stadium, Dublin	13–24	South Africa	2025 Autumn International	51,700	
32	21 November 2026	Aviva Stadium, Dublin	20–17	Ireland	2026 Nations Championship	51,700	

== List of series ==
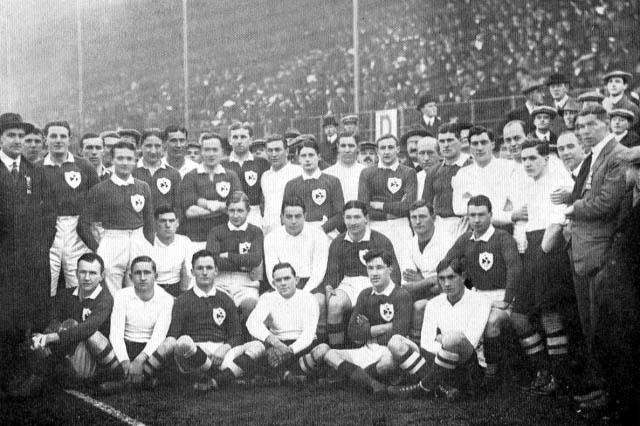
South Africa and Ireland teams posing together at their 1912 test at Lansdowne Road.

Played	Won by Ireland	Won by South Africa	Drawn
5	0	4	1

Year	Ireland	South Africa	Series winner
1981	0	2	South Africa
1998	0	2	South Africa
2004	0	2	South Africa
2016	1	2	South Africa
2024	1	1	draw
