= Attorney General Castle =

Attorney General Castle may refer to:

- Latham Castle (1900–1986), Attorney General of Illinois
- William Richards Castle (1849–1935), Attorney General of the Kingdom of Hawaii

== See also ==
- General Castle (disambiguation)
