= Timothy P. Williams =

U.S. Army Major General

Tim Williams
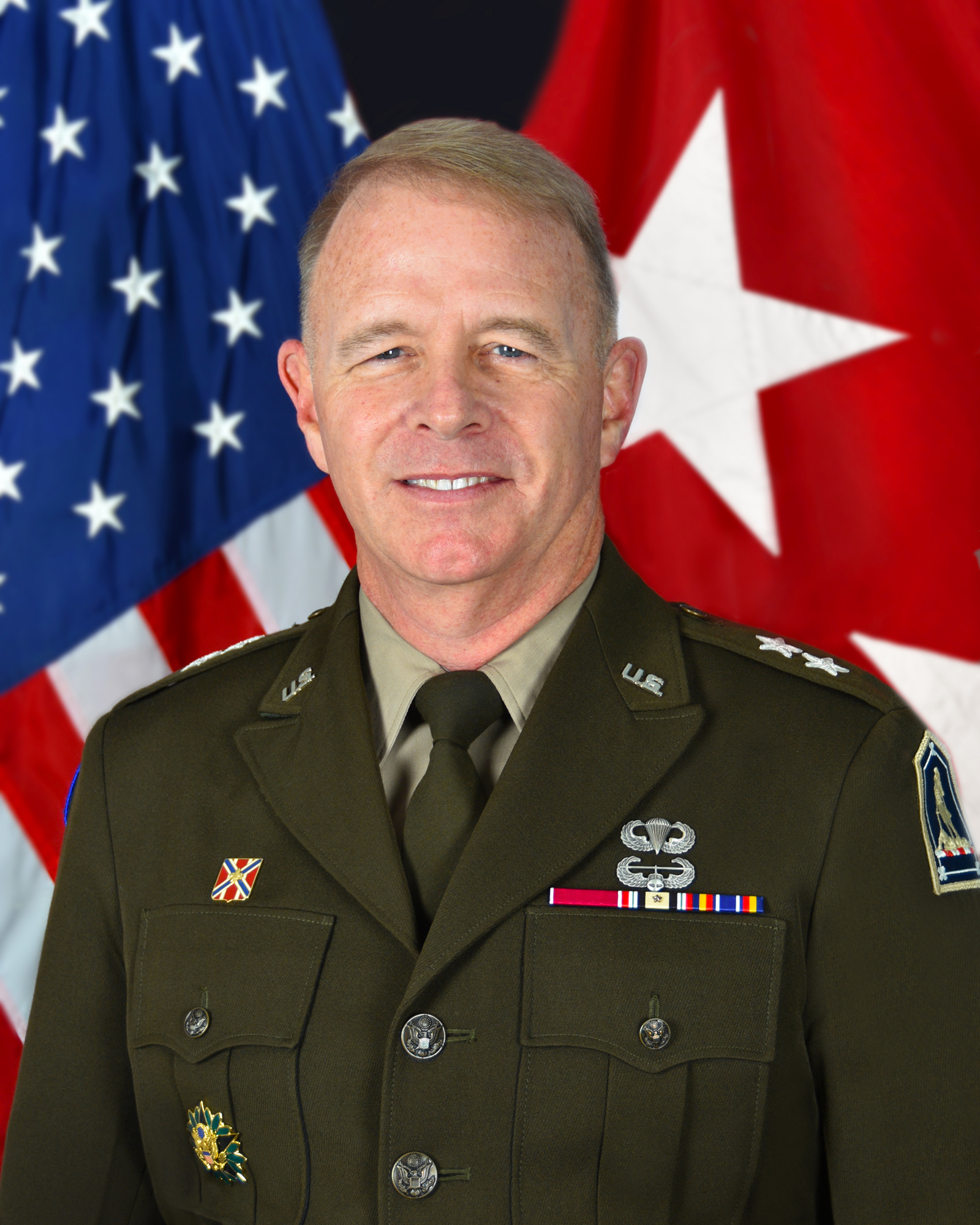
- Official portrait, 2021

6th Virginia Secretary of Veterans Affairs
- Incumbent
- Assumed office January 17, 2026
- Governor: Abigail Spanberger
- Preceded by: Craig Crenshaw

28th Adjutant General of Virginia
- In office June 2, 2014 – June 3, 2023
- Governor: Terry McAuliffe; Ralph Northam; Glenn Youngkin
- Preceded by: Chip Long
- Succeeded by: James W. Ring

Personal details
- Born: Timothy Paschal Williams Richmond, Virginia, U.S.
- Education: Virginia Tech (BS); Webster University (MA); United States Army War College (MSS)

Military service
- Allegiance: United States
- Branch/service: United States Army
- Years of service: 1985–2023
- Rank: Major general
- Unit: National Guard Bureau
- Commands: Virginia National Guard Virginia Department of Military Affairs: The Adjutant General of Virginia; Virginia Army National Guard: J-8 - Joint Forces Headquarters; 329th Regional Support Group; 1-111th Field Artillery Battalion, 54th Field Artillery; Battery C, 1-246th Field Artillery Battalion, 29th Infantry Division (Light)
- Battles/wars: Operation Iraqi Freedom; Operation Noble Eagle
- Awards: Legion of Merit; Meritorious Service Medal (2); Commendation Medal (6)

Timothy Paschal Williams is a retired United States Army major general who is serving as the 6th Virginia Secretary of Veterans Affairs under Governor Abigail Spanberger since 2026. He previously served as Adjutant General of Virginia, during which he commanded the Virginia Army National Guard, Virginia Air National Guard, and the Virginia Defense Force. Williams is the co-author of, Let’s Go! The History of the 29th Infantry Division 1917–2001.

== Education ==
A native of Richmond, Virginia, in 1985 he received his bachelor's degree in Management Science from Virginia Tech's Pamplin College of Business in Blacksburg, Virginia and earned a Master of Arts in Management from Webster University in 1989. A graduate of the US Army War College, Williams earned a Masters in Strategic Studies in 2006 at Carlisle Barracks, Pennsylvania.

== Military career ==
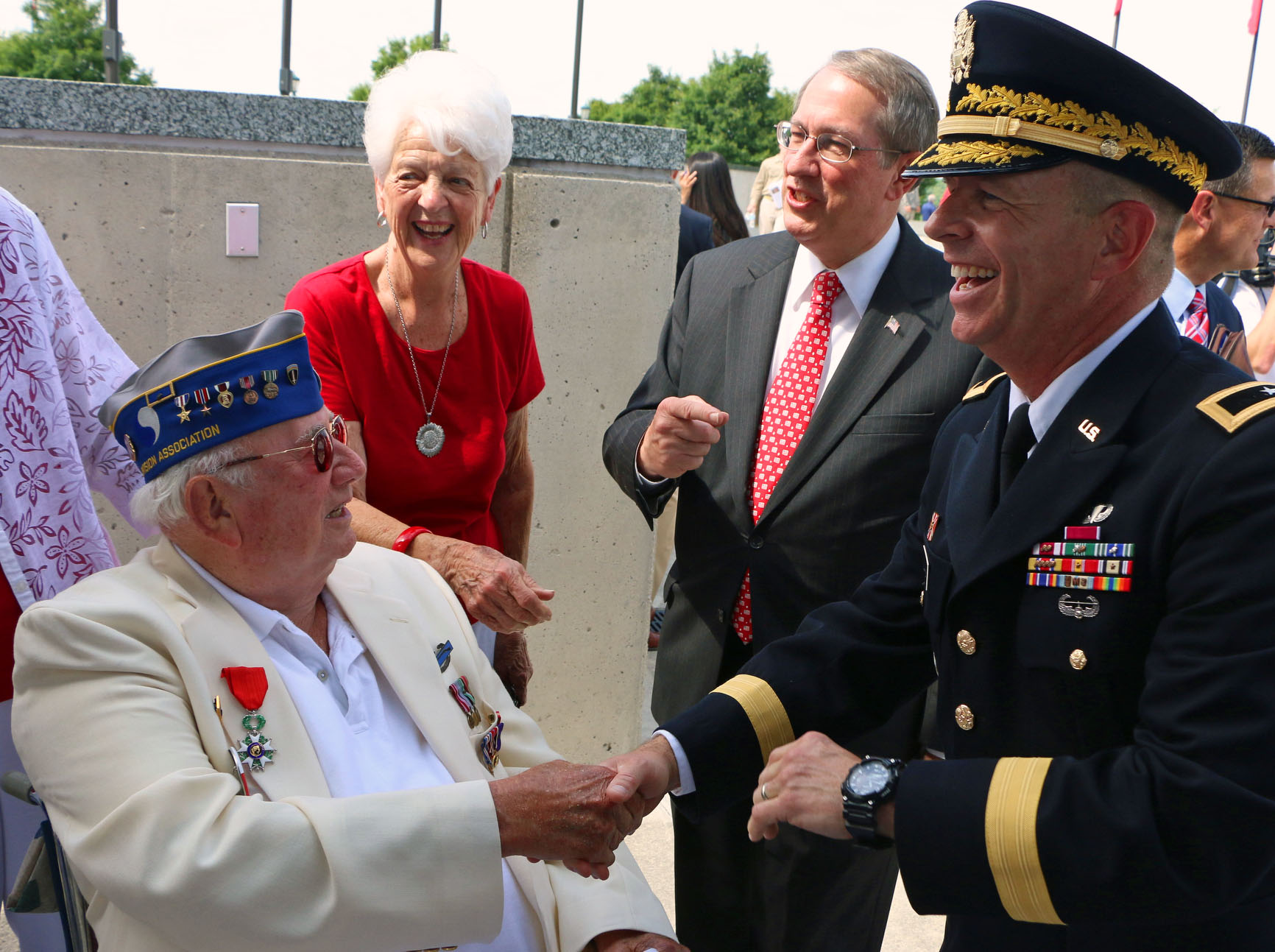
Williams speaks to a World War II 29th Infantry Division veteran at a Ceremony marking the 70th Anniversary of D-Day on June 6, 2014, at the National D-Day Memorial in Bedford, Virginia

=== ROTC and U.S. Army Service ===
Williams was commissioned as a Field Artillery 2nd Lieutenant upon graduation from Virginia Polytechnic Institute and State University in 1985. He was a member of the Virginia Tech Corps of Cadets and the Regimental Band, the Highty-Tighties. He served on active duty in the 3rd Armored Cavalry Regiment in Fort Bliss, Texas. While in the regiment, he served as a fire support team chief, battery fire direction officer, squadron fire support officer and regimental nuclear targeting officer until 1990.

=== Virginia National Guard ===
Upon leaving active service he joined the Virginia Army National Guard. He commanded at the field artillery battery and battalion level before transferring to the Quartermaster Corps. Williams commanded the Virginia Beach-based 329th Regional Support Group for four years.

=== Return to Civilian Life ===
He was a Department of the Army civilian for over a decade, serving in his last assignment as Director of Training Support and Doctrine, G-3, Combined Arms Support Command at Fort Lee, Virginia.

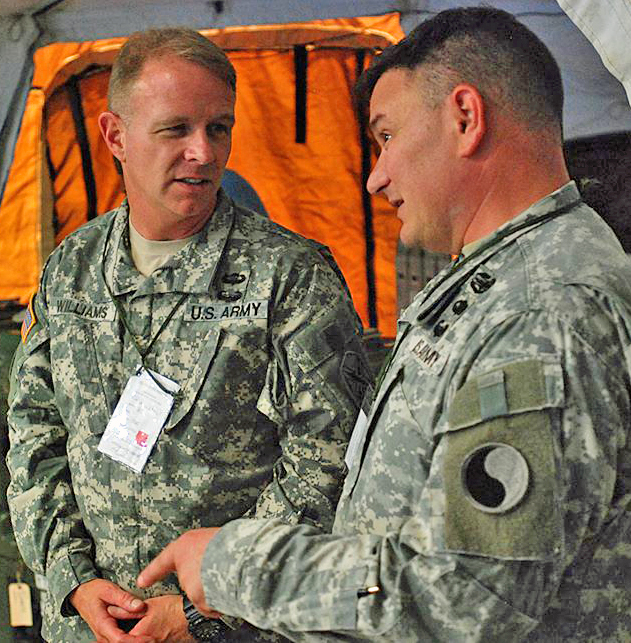
Williams visits the 29th Infantry Division during their annual training June 13, 2014, at Fort A.P. Hill, Virginia

=== Reactivation for the Global War on Terror to Present Day ===
Mobilized in 2003, he supported Operation Noble Eagle where he worked with security operations for US Air Force installations in the mid-Atlantic states.

He deployed in 2007 to Iraq for Operation Iraqi Freedom where he supported theater level logistics transformation.

His most recent military assignment prior to becoming Adjutant General was as J-8 Director of Resource Management on the Virginia National Guard Joint Staff.

On June 2, 2014, he was sworn in as the new Adjutant General of Virginia by Deputy Secretary of the Commonwealth Kelly Thomasson and was promoted to the rank of Brigadier General at the Virginia Joint Force Headquarters in Sandston, Virginia.

Promoted to Major General on June 29, 2016, Williams is responsible for the combat readiness of units, and the administration and training of more than 8,600 Virginia Army and Air National Guard personnel.

He is due to retire in July 2023; James W. Ring having succeeded him as Adjutant General of Virginia on June 2, 2023.

== Awards and decorations ==
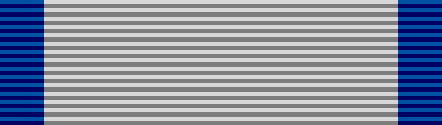
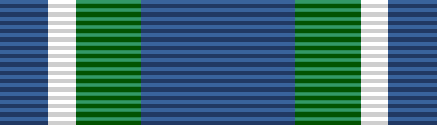
Parachutist Badge
Air Assault Badge
Legion of Merit
Meritorious Service Medal with two oak leaf clusters
Army Commendation Medal with six oak leaf clusters
Army Achievement Medal with five oak leaf clusters
Army Reserve Components Achievement Medal with four oak leaf clusters
National Defense Service Medal
Iraqi Campaign Medal
Global War on Terrorism Service Medal
Armed Forces Reserve Medal with bronze Hourglass device and 2 Mobilization devices
Army Service Ribbon
Virginia Service Ribbon (5th Award)
Virginia Emergency Service Ribbon

== Dates of promotion ==
- Second Lieutenant USA - 7 June 1985
- First Lieutenant USA - 2 November 1986
- Captain ARNG - 14 November 1990
- Major ARNG - 22 September 1994
- Lieutenant Colonel ARNG - 14 January 2000
- Colonel ARNG - 9 July 2004
- Brigadier General ARNG - June 2, 2014
- Major General ARNG - June 29, 2016

== Bibliography ==
- Let’s Go! The History of the 29th Infantry Division. Timothy Williams, Alexander F. Barnes, and Chris Calkins, Schiffer Publishing, Ltd. 2014 ISBN 0764346369
