= John G. Castles =

United States Army general

Jack Castles
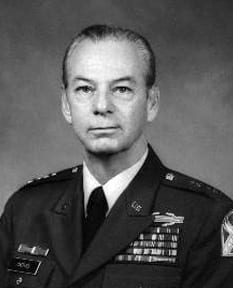

23rd Adjutant General of Virginia
- In office August 2, 1982 – July 24, 1994
- Governor: Chuck Robb; Gerald Baliles; Douglas Wilder; George Allen
- Preceded by: William McCaddin
- Succeeded by: Carroll Thackston

Personal details
- Born: John Glover Castles; January 1, 1925 East Orange, New Jersey
- Died: June 18, 2001 (aged 76) Fredericksburg, Virginia
- Spouse: Dorothy Towles Rowe
- Education: University of Virginia

Military service
- Allegiance: United States
- Branch/service: United States Army
- Years of service: 1943–1994
- Rank: Major General
- Unit: National Guard Bureau
- Commands: Virginia National Guard; 116th Infantry Brigade; 224th Field Artillery Group; 2nd Battalion, 116th Infantry; Company K, 116th Infantry
- Battles/wars: World War II
- Awards: Distinguished Service Medal; Legion of Merit (2); Bronze Star Medal; Meritorious Service Medal

John Glover Castles (January 1, 1925 – June 18, 2001) was a United States Army major general and former Adjutant General of Virginia.

Born in East Orange, New Jersey, Castles graduated from the Valley Forge Military Academy in 1943. He enlisted in the U.S. Army in May 1943 and was commissioned in 1944 after completing Infantry Officer Candidate School. Castles served in combat with the 345th Infantry, 87th Infantry Division, 3rd Army in Europe during World War II.

After being discharged from active duty on April 15, 1946, Castles enrolled at the University of Virginia and earned a B.S. degree in 1950. He later completed courses at the United States Army Command and General Staff College in 1960 and 1964. Castles was confirmed as a United States Army Reserve brigadier general on February 8, 1974 and served as commander of the 116th Infantry Brigade (Separate) from 1977 to 1979. He was appointed adjutant general in August 1982 and confirmed as a major general on February 24, 1983.
