= Carlos Hopkins =

American attorney and National Guard soldier

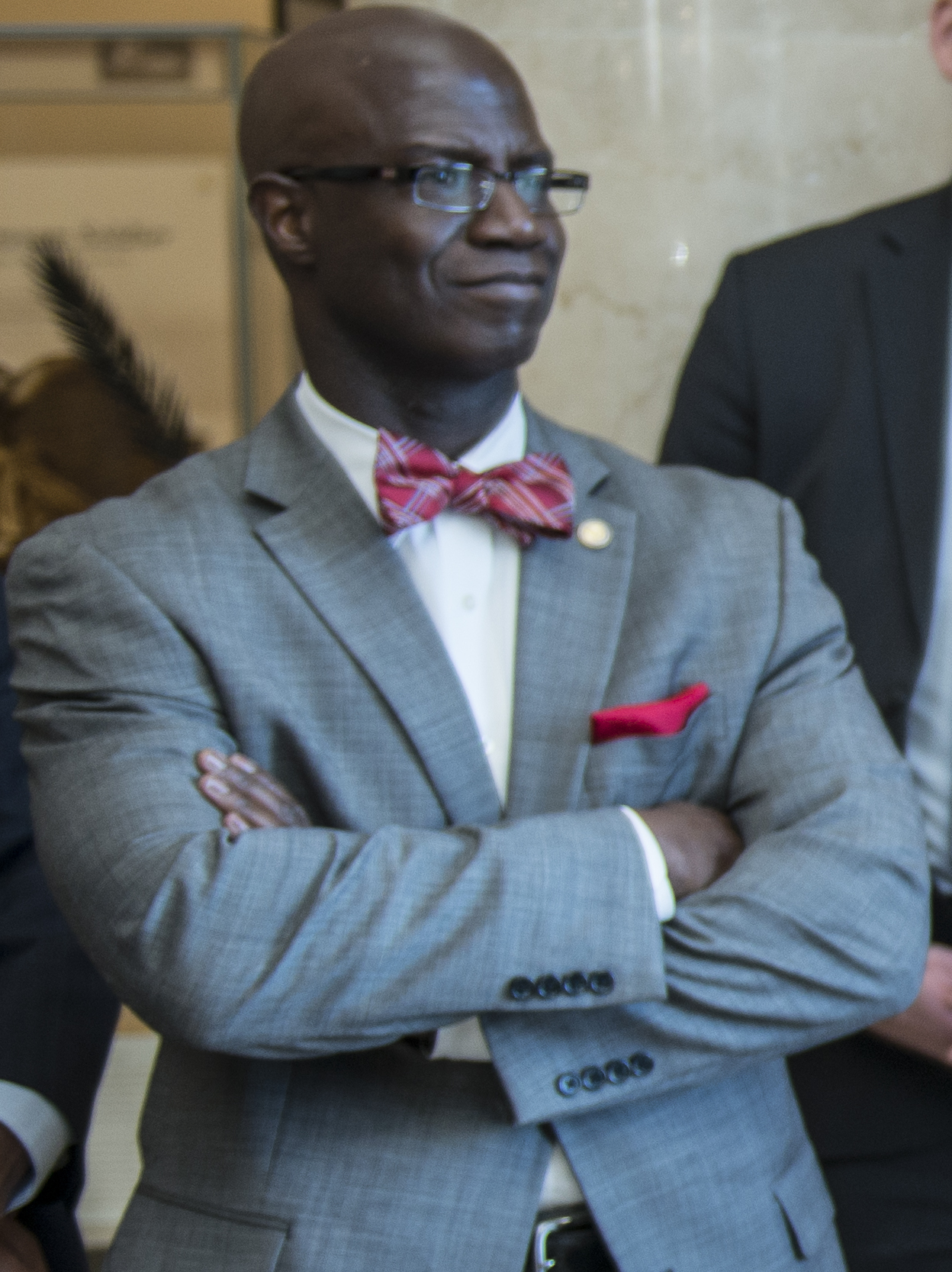
- Hopkins in 2018

4th Virginia Secretary of Veterans Affairs
- In office September 1, 2017 – January 15, 2022
- Governor: Terry McAuliffe; Ralph Northam
- Preceded by: John C. Harvey Jr.
- Succeeded by: Craig Crenshaw

Counsel to the Governor of Virginia
- In office January 11, 2014 – September 1, 2017
- Governor: Terry McAuliffe
- Preceded by: Jasen Eige
- Succeeded by: Noah Sullivan

Personal details
- Born: Carlos LeMont Hopkins; February 27, 1971 (age 55) Columbia, South Carolina, U.S.
- Party: Democratic
- Education: The Citadel (B.A.); University of Richmond (J.D.)

Military service
- Allegiance: United States
- Branch/service: United States Army Reserve; Virginia Army Natl. Guard
- Years of service: 1990–1998 (USAR); 1998–present (ARNG)
- Rank: Colonel
- Unit: J.A.G. Corps

Carlos LeMont Hopkins (born February 27, 1971) is an American attorney and National Guard soldier. Previously serving as counsel to Virginia Governor Terry McAuliffe, he was selected to serve as Virginia Secretary of Veterans and Defense Affairs following the departure of John C. Harvey Jr. in 2017, and was retained in that post when Ralph Northam took office as Governor in January 2018.

Born and raised in Columbia, South Carolina, Hopkins graduated in 1993 from The Citadel, The Military College of South Carolina with a degree in political science. He then attended the University of Richmond School of Law and worked in private practice and as deputy city attorney for Richmond, Virginia.

Political offices
Preceded by John C. Harvey Jr.	Virginia Secretary of Veterans Affairs; 2017–present	Succeeded by Incumbent
