= John C. Harvey Jr. =

United States admiral (born 1951)

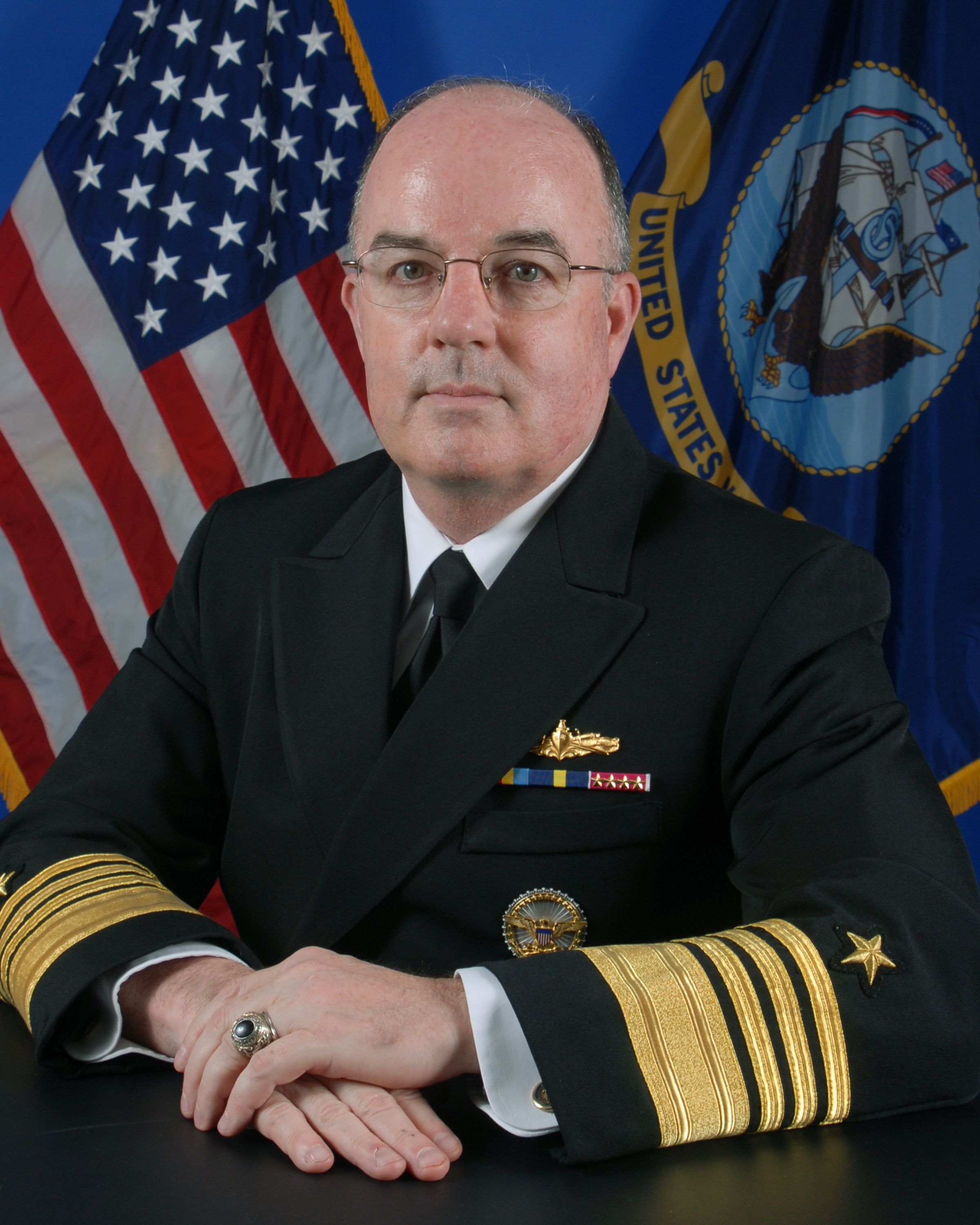

3rd Virginia Secretary of Veterans and Defense Affairs
- In office January 11, 2014 – August 31, 2017
- Governor: Terry McAuliffe
- Preceded by: James W. Hopper
- Succeeded by: Carlos Hopkins

Personal details
- Born: December 17, 1951 (age 74) Baltimore, Maryland, U.S.
- Spouse: Mary Ellen Swift
- Education: United States Naval Academy (BS); Harvard University (MPA)
- Profession: Naval officer
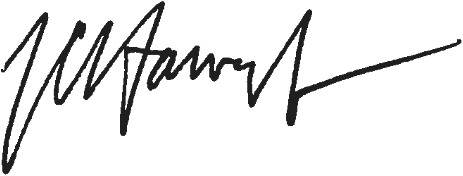
- Signature

Military service
- Allegiance: United States
- Branch/service: United States Navy
- Years of service: 1973–2012
- Rank: Admiral
- Commands: United States Fleet Forces Command; Cruiser-Destroyer Group Eight/Theodore Roosevelt Strike Group; USS Cape St. George (CG-71); USS David R. Ray (DD-971)
- Battles/wars: Gulf War
- Awards: Defense Distinguished Service Medal; Navy Distinguished Service Medal (2); Legion of Merit (5); Bronze Star Medal

John Collins Harvey Jr. (born December 17, 1951) is a former United States Navy four-star admiral who last served as the 31st Commander, United States Fleet Forces Command from July 24, 2009, to September 14, 2012. He previously served as Director, Navy Staff (N09B) from March 24, 2008, to July 23, 2009. Prior to that, he served as the 54th Chief of Naval Personnel and Deputy Chief of Naval Operations (Manpower, Personnel, Training & Education) (N1) from November 2005 to April 2008. He retired from the navy after more than 39 years of service.

Harvey was born and raised in Baltimore, Maryland and graduated from Phillips Exeter Academy in 1969. He received his commission from the United States Naval Academy in 1973 and immediately commenced training in the navy's Nuclear Propulsion program. In 1988, he received a master's degree in Public Administration from the John F. Kennedy School of Government at Harvard University.

== Naval career ==
Harvey has served at sea on the USS Enterprise (CVN-65), USS Bainbridge (CGN-25), USS McInerney (FFG-8), as Reactor Officer on the USS Nimitz (CVN-68), and as Executive Officer on the USS Long Beach (CGN-9). He commanded USS David R. Ray (DD-971), USS Cape St. George (CG-71) and Cruiser-Destroyer Group Eight/Theodore Roosevelt Strike Group. He has deployed to the North and South Atlantic; the Mediterranean, Baltic and Red Seas; the Western Pacific, Indian Ocean, and the Persian Gulf. Harvey's shore assignments includes two tours at the Bureau of Naval Personnel, as the Senior Military Assistant to the Under Secretary of Defense (Policy), as Director, Total Force Programming and Manpower Management Division (OPNAV N12), and as Deputy for Warfare Integration (OPNAV N7F).

On November 22, 2005, Harvey was promoted to vice admiral and assumed duties as the navy's 54th Chief of Naval Personnel and Deputy Chief of Naval Operations (Manpower, Personnel, Training & Education).

On January 24, 2008, Harvey was nominated by President George W. Bush for reappointment to the grade of vice admiral and assignment as Director, Navy Staff (N09B). He was confirmed by the United States Senate on March 13, 2008. With the removal of previous Director, Navy Staff, Vice Admiral John Stufflebeem, Harvey assumed those duties on March 24, 2008.

On April 15, 2009, Harvey was nominated by President Barack Obama for appointment to the grade of admiral and assignment as Commander, United States Fleet Forces Command . He was confirmed by the Senate on May 4, 2009, and assumed the assignment on July 24, 2009.

On December 16, 2011, the United States Navy's Old Salt designation was passed to Harvey, making him the longest-serving Surface Warfare Officer currently on active duty within the United States Navy.

== Use of social media ==
Harvey is active in the naval blogosphere, often posting at the United States Naval Institute's blog. As Commander, United States Fleet Forces Command, he maintained his own blog.

== Post-military career ==
Harvey was appointed as the Secretary of Veterans Affairs and Homeland Security in the cabinet of Virginia Governor Terry McAuliffe. In accordance with legislation signed by Governor McAuliffe in March 2014, his post was renamed as the Secretary of Veterans and Defense Affairs. In October 2017 Harvey became the Director of Strategy, Forces and Resources Division (SFRD) at the Institute for Defense Analyses in Alexandria VA.

== Awards and decorations ==
| Surface Warfare Officer |
| Office of the Secretary of Defense Identification Badge |

| Defense Distinguished Service Medal |
| Navy Distinguished Service Medal with one gold award star |
| Legion of Merit with four gold award stars |
| Bronze Star Medal |
| Meritorious Service Medal with four gold award stars |
| Navy and Marine Corps Commendation Medal |
| Navy and Marine Corps Achievement Medal |
| Navy "E" Ribbon with three Battle E devices |
| Navy Unit Commendation Ribbon with one bronze service stars |
| Navy Meritorious Unit Commendation Ribbon |
| National Defense Service Medal with two service stars |
| Armed Forces Expeditionary Medal |
| Southwest Asia Service Medal |
| Global War on Terrorism Service Medal |
| Kuwait Liberation Medal (Saudi Arabia) |
| Kuwait Liberation Medal (Kuwait) |

Political offices
| Preceded by James W. Hopper | Virginia Secretary of Veterans Affairs; 2014–2017 | Succeeded by Carlos Hopkins |
