= Attorney General Williams =

Attorney General Williams may refer to:

- Allan Williams (politician) (1922–2011), Attorney General of British Columbia
- Daniel Williams (governor-general) (born 1935), Attorney-General of Grenada
- Daryl Williams (politician) (born 1942), Attorney-General of Australia
- Gareth Williams, Baron Williams of Mostyn (1941–2003), Attorney General for England and Wales and Attorney General for Northern Ireland
- George Henry Williams (1823–1910), Attorney General of the United States
- Thomas H. Williams (California official) (1828–1886), Attorney General of California

== See also ==
- General Williams (disambiguation)
