= Craig Crenshaw =

United States Marine Corps general

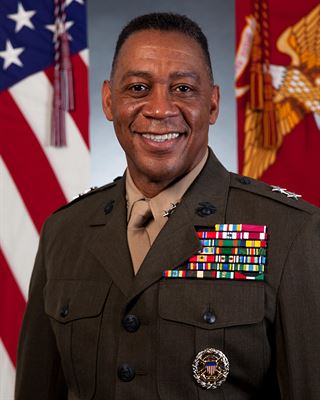

5th Virginia Secretary of Veterans Affairs
- In office February 8, 2022 – January 17, 2026
- Governor: Glenn Youngkin
- Preceded by: Carlos Hopkins
- Succeeded by: Timothy P. Williams

Personal details
- Born: Craig Christopher Crenshaw; 1962 (age 63–64) Pensacola, Florida, U.S.
- Education: Southern University (BA); Webster University (MA); Eisenhower School (MA)

Military service
- Branch/service: United States Marine Corps
- Years of service: 1984–2019
- Rank: Major general
- Battles/wars: Gulf War

Craig Christopher Crenshaw (born 1962) is a retired American military officer who served as the Virginia Secretary of Veterans and Defense Affairs under governor Glenn Youngkin.

Political offices
Preceded by Carlos Hopkins	Virginia Secretary of Veterans Affairs; 2022–2026	Succeeded by Timothy P. Williams
