= Virginia's 81st House of Delegates district =

Virginia legislative district

District map from the 2023 election

Virginia's 81st House of Delegates district elects one of 100 seats in the Virginia House of Delegates, the lower house of the state's bicameral legislature. District 81, in Virginia Beach and Chesapeake, Virginia, has been represented by Republican Barry Knight since 2010.

== District officeholders ==
Years	Delegate	Party	Electoral history
January 12, 1983 – December 30, 1986	Owen B. Pickett	Democratic	Resigned after being elected to Congress
January 1987 – January 12, 2000	Glenn R. Croshaw	Democratic	Lost reelection
January 12, 2000 – October 12, 2008	Terrie Suit	Republican	Resigned after announcing retirement from House
January 8, 2009 – present	Barry Knight	Republican	First elected in 2008
