= Thomas Williams (Australian Army officer) =

- Born: 10 April 1884; Bundaberg, Queensland
- Died: 23 October 1950 (aged 66)
- Military career
- Allegiance: Australia
- Branch: Australian Army
- Service years: 1912–1944
- Rank: Major General
- Conflicts: First World War; Second World War
- Awards: Companion of the Order of St Michael and St George; Distinguished Service Order; Mentioned in Despatches (5); Croix de guerre (Belgium)

Major General Thomas Rhys Williams, CMG, DSO (10 April 1884 – 23 October 1950) was an officer in the Australian Army who held senior administrative appointments in the Second World War. Williams served as Master-General of Ordnance from the outbreak of war in 1939 until 1940, when he was appointed Chief Military Advisor to the Ministry of Munitions. Following his retirement from the army in 1944, he was the Australian representative to the Imperial War Graves Commission.
