= Nick Drake-Lee =

England international rugby union player (1942–2021)

- Born: Nicholas James Drake-Lee; 7 April 1942 Kettering, England
- Died: 22 January 2021 (aged 78)

Rugby union career
- Position: Prop
Senior career
Years	Team	Apps	(Points)
1962–68	Leicester Tigers	73	(21)
International career
Years	Team	Apps	(Points)
1963–65	England	8	(3)

Nicholas James Drake-Lee (7 April 1942 – 22 January 2021) was a rugby union prop who played 73 games for Leicester Tigers between 1962 and 1968; he represented England 8 times between 1963 and 1965. He was a Cambridge University blue between 1961 and 1963.

Drake-Lee made his Leicester debut against Bath on 6 January 1962 and played 10 times that season.

He was a member of the Cambridge University rugby team in their undefeated 1961 season winning 14 games including the Varsity Match. Before Cambridge, he was a Rugby Vice-Captain at Stonyhurst College.

Drake-Lee made his international debut for England on 19 January 1963 against Wales at Cardiff. He played in all four games as England won the 1963 Five Nations Championship.
