= Steve Richards (rugby union) =

England international rugby union player

- Full name: Stephen Brookhouse Richards
- Born: 28 August 1941 (age 85) West Kirby, England
- School: Clifton College
- University: University of Oxford
- Occupation: Solicitor

Rugby union career
- Position: Hooker
International career
Years	Team	Apps	(Points)
1965–67	England	9	(0)

Stephen Brookhouse Richards (born 28 August 1941) is an English former international rugby union player.

Born in West Kirby, Richards learned his rugby union while a pupil at Clifton College, where he one of his coaches was ex-England back-rower John Kendall-Carpenter. He underwent further studies at the University of Oxford and was awarded a blue his final year in 1962.

Richards was a surprise selection as England hooker for the 1965 Five Nations. This came only a few months after he had taken the hooker position for his club Richmond, having been an understudy to Pat Orr. He subsequently took Orr's place in the Middlesex county side and won his England call up following his performances in three trials matches. After featuring in all of England Five Nations fixtures, Richards lost his position to John Pullin.

In 1967, Richards resumed his England career, playing a match against the Wallabies at Twickenham, followed by the Five Nations and a tour of Canada. Pullin was then able to cement himself as the team's regular hooker and Richards didn't get any further opportunities, finishing with nine caps.

Richards became a solicitor.

== See also ==
- List of England national rugby union players
