= Peter Williams (rugby, born 1958) =

GB & Wales rugby league international and England rugby union international player

Personal information
- Full name: Peter Nicholas Williams
- Born: 14 December 1958 (age 67) Wigan, England

Playing information

Rugby union
- Position: Fly-half
Club
Years	Team	Pld	T	G	FG	P
1977–88	Orrell R.U.F.C.
Representative
Years	Team	Pld	T	G	FG	P
≤1988–≤88	Lancashire
1987	England	4	0	0	0	0

Rugby league
- Position: Centre
Club
Years	Team	Pld	T	G	FG	P
1988–94	Salford	154	35	0	0	140
Representative
Years	Team	Pld	T	G	FG	P
1989	Great Britain	2	1	0	0	4
1989	Lancashire	1	0	0	0	0
1992	Wales	1	0	0	0	0

Peter Nicholas Williams (born 14 December 1958) is an English-born former dual-code international rugby union, and professional rugby league footballer who played in the 1980s and 1990s. He played representative level rugby union for England and Lancashire, and at club level for Orrell R.U.F.C., as a Fly-half and representative level rugby league for Great Britain and Wales, and at club level for Salford, as a centre.

== Background ==
Peter Williams was born in Wigan, Lancashire, England, and attended Upholland Grammar School. His father, Roy Williams, was a prop forward who played rugby union for Llanelli RFC and rugby league for Wigan, and later became a solicitor after finishing his playing career.

He worked as a physical education and history teacher, but later re-trained to become a physiotherapist when he began playing rugby league.

== Rugby union career ==
Williams debuted for Orrell in 1977. He went on to represent Lancashire in the County Championship, and played in the 1979–80 and 1981–82 Championship finals. He won caps for England while at Orrell in the 1987 Five Nations Championship against Scotland and in the 1987 Rugby World Cup against Australia, Japan, and Wales.

In 1996, Williams returned to Orrell as director of rugby. He resigned in April 1997. He then spent two years as an assistant coach at Wigan, where he also made appearances as a player.

== Rugby league career ==
=== Salford ===
In March 1988, Williams switched codes to join rugby league club Salford.

Williams played fullback (replaced by substitute Ian Blease) in Salford's 17–22 defeat by Wigan in the 1988 Lancashire Cup Final during the 1988–89 season at Knowsley Road, St. Helens on Sunday 23 October 1988. and played left-centre and scored a try in the 18–24 defeat by Widnes in the 1990 Lancashire Cup Final during the 1990–91 season at Central Park, Wigan on Saturday 29 September 1990.

He retired at the end of the 1993–94 season.

=== International career ===
Williams won two caps for Great Britain (RL) while at Salford in 1989 against France (2 matches). He also played for Wales in 1992 while at Salford. He is sometimes credited as the first person to play rugby union for England and rugby league for Wales, but this was first done by Thomas Woods in the 1920s.
