= John Burgess (rugby union) =

Irish rugby union player

John Burges
- Born: John Hume Burges; 26 October 1928 Tipperary, Ireland
- Died: 14 January 2015 (aged 86) Dublin, Ireland
- School: St John's School, Leatherhead

Rugby union career
- Position: Scrum-half
International career
Years	Team	Apps	(Points)
1950	Ireland	2	(3)

John Hume Burges (26 October 1928 – 14 January 2015) was an Irish rugby union player who played in the scrum-half position. He was educated at St John's School, Leatherhead and was capped twice for Ireland.
