= James L. Williams =

United States Marine Corps general

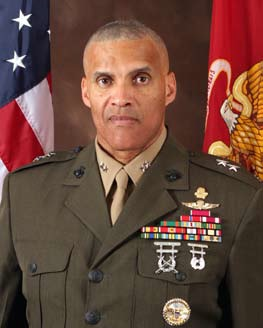
- Born: Bethlehem, Pennsylvania, U.S.
- Military career
- Allegiance: United States of America
- Branch: United States Marine Corps
- Service years: 1976–2010
- Rank: Major General
- Commands: 1st Marine Expeditionary Force; 4th Marine Division
- Conflicts: Iraq War; War in Afghanistan
- Awards: Legion of Merit; Bronze Star Medal

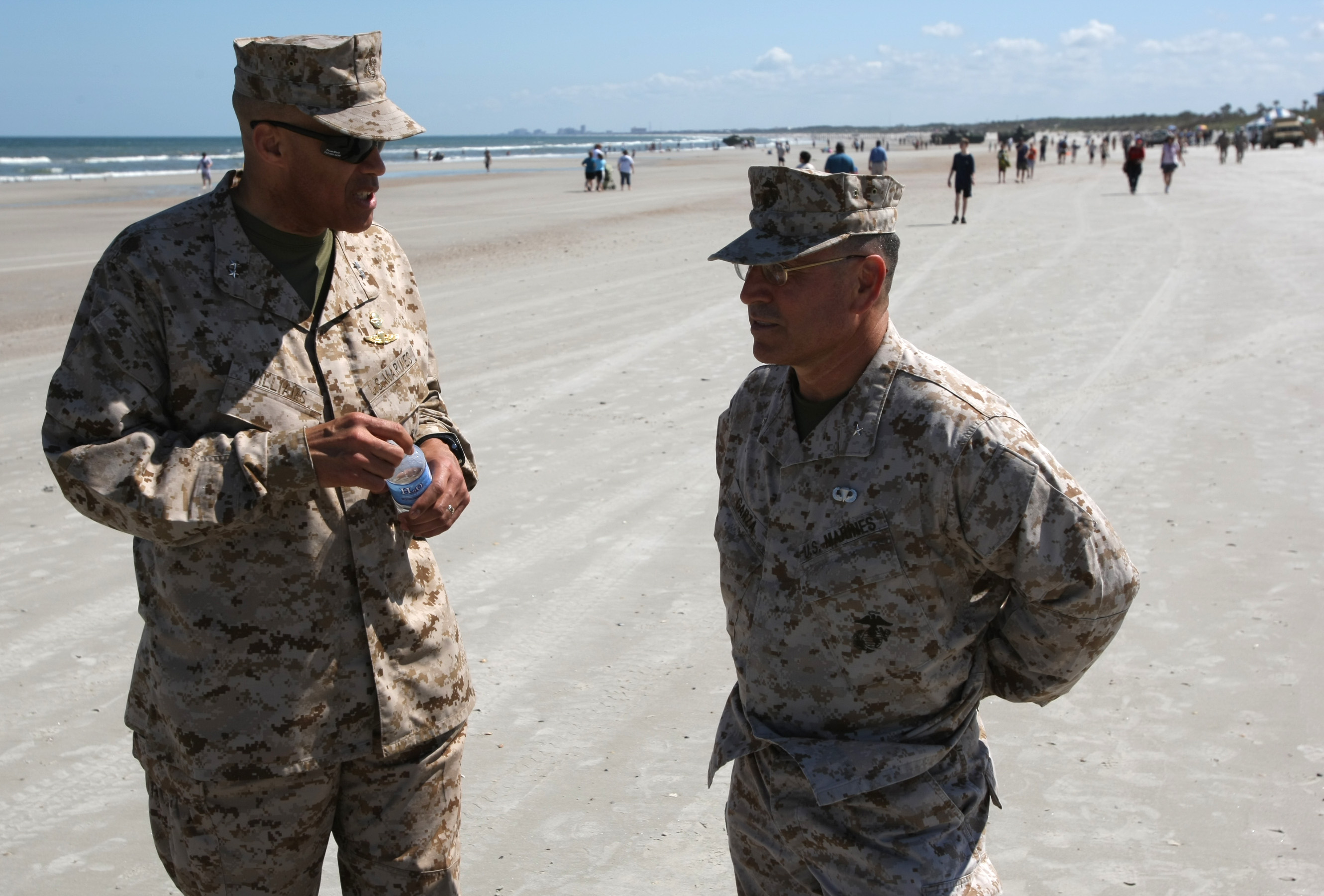
Williams (left) with Brig. Gen. David Garza during a training exercise in 2009

Major General James L. Williams (Ret.) was the commanding general of the 4th Marine Division, a position he was appointed to in April 2007.

== Biography ==
His previous position was as the assistant division commander, 2nd Marine Division which began in November 2006. His previous assignment was as deputy commanding general (Mobilization), Marine Corps Combat Development Command. He also served during combat operations as the assistant division commander, 2d Marine Division from 2005 to 2006, at Camp Blue Diamond, Ar-Ramadi, Iraq, and earlier with I Marine Expeditionary Force as the deputy commanding general in Fallujah, Iraq. He also serves on the SecDef Reserve Force Policy Board.

Major General Williams was born in Bethlehem, Pennsylvania. His formative years were spent in Reading and Philadelphia, Pennsylvania. He received a B.S degree from Slippery Rock University, in 1975. He reported to Officer Candidate School in January 1976, and received his commission in March 1976. He received master's degrees from Georgetown University in government and national security affairs in 1981, from Yale University in hospital management/public health in 1984, and from the U.S. Army War College in international security studies in 2000. Currently, he is in the process of working on his master's degree in computer engineering and computer science.

Upon completion of The Basic School, Quantico, Virginia, in 1976, he did a short tour with the Officer Selection Office in Pittsburgh, Pennsylvania. He was subsequently assigned in 1976 to the 3rd Marine Division to serve with 3rd Battalion, 9th Marines serving as a rifle platoon leader and the Super Squad Platoon.

Returning from overseas in January 1978, he reported to 2nd Force Troops (now 2nd Marine Logistics Group), as the assistant command inspector. He was then assigned to 2nd Force Reconnaissance Company as a Force Recon platoon leader and deployed several times for NATO exercises. During this period he attended reconnaissance training schools.

In 1979, he was transferred to the Marine Barracks, Washington, D.C. He was promoted to captain in 1980. During this tour, he served as ceremonial platoon leader; White House presidential military social aide to Presidents Carter and Reagan; coach of the barracks boxing team; head, The Basic School Correspondence Course, Marine Corps Institute; and attended graduate school at Georgetown University from 1979 to 1981. He completed the Amphibious Warfare Non-Resident Course in 1980.

In 1981, he was assigned to the Reserve component of the Marine Corps and was assigned to duty with the 14th Marines where he served with 2nd Battalion, 14th Marines, 4th Marine Division as a forward observer, battery executive officer, battery commanding officer, and battalion logistics officer. While with the 14th Marines, in 1986, he was the recipient of the Outstanding Junior Marine Corps Reserve Officer Award presented by the Reserve Officers Association. He was promoted to major in 1987. He also completed graduate school at Yale University during this period.

He was then assigned to the 4th Reconnaissance Battalion in 1988, where he served as the battalion operations and training officer, battalion diving officer, and executive officer. During 1990–1991, the battalion was called to duty for Operation Desert Shield/Storm. One reconnaissance company was assigned to lead the reconnaissance efforts for both the 1st and 2nd Divisions in their attacks on Iraq. The remainder of the battalion was assigned to conduct counter-narcotics operations in CONUS and OCONUS. In 1991, he attended the Marine Corps Reserve Command and Staff College Course as a student.

In 1992, he completed school and was assigned to the 4th Marine Division as assistant operations officer. In 1993, he completed the Air Command and Staff College Reserve Component Course. In October 1993, he was assigned as the assistant G-6. He was promoted to lieutenant colonel in 1994. In 1995, he was assigned as commanding officer, 1st Battalion, 23rd Marines. In 1997, the battalion was assigned to the 1st Marine Regiment, 1st Marine Division for Kernel Blitz '97. He was selected in 1997, to attend the U.S. Army War College Distant Education Program. He was promoted to colonel in 1998.

He was then selected and assigned to be the deputy commander, 1st Marine Expeditionary Force Augmentation Command Element (I MACE) in 2000. In 2000, he graduated from the U.S. Army War College. In 2002, while in this assignment he was assigned as the deputy director, Operations CJTF-180, conducting combat operations in Afghanistan for Operation Enduring Freedom. He was selected for promotion to brigadier general 2003.

From 2003 to 2005, he served as the commander, 1st Marine Expeditionary Force Augmentation Command Element (I MACE), during this period he served as the acting commanding general, I Marine Expeditionary Force at Camp Pendleton.

== American Board of Disaster Medicine ==
In 2009, Williams was appointed a public board member of the American Board of Disaster Medicine (ABODM). The ABODM, found in 2006, is a board member of the American Board of Physician Specialties (ABPS), headquartered in Tampa, Florida. The ABPS is the third largest nationally recognized physician multi-specialty certifying organization. For more information about the American Board of Disaster Medicine visit www.abodm.org.

== Cyber crime fighter ==
Williams chaired the North Texas Crime Commission, Cyber Crime Committed from 2012 to 2015. His suggestion founded the UT Dallas / Cyber Defense Labs, Cyber Summer Camp is 2013.
