= Pete Williams (footballer) =

Welsh footballer

Personal information
- Date of birth: March 12, 1954 (age 72)
- Place of birth: Colwyn Bay, Wales
- Position: Goalkeeper

Youth career
- Llandudno Junction
- Llandudno
- Conwy United

Senior career*
Years	Team	Apps	(Gls)
- Conwy United
–1973	Rhyl		
1973–1975	Preston North End	0	(0)
1975–1985	Telford United		
1985–1987	Shifnal Town		
- * Club domestic league appearances and goals

Peter Williams (born 12 March 1954) is a Welsh football goalkeeping coach and former player.

He most notably played for Preston North End under Bobby Charlton but spent a decade at Telford United. He has since been a professional goalkeeping coach for over 30 years, and has notably worked on the Premier League coaching staff at Sunderland as well as Northampton Town, Wolverhampton Wanderers, Bradford City, Shrewsbury Town, Swindon Town, Preston North End, Derby County, Nottingham Forest and Grimsby Town.

== Playing career ==
Williams started out playing football as a 14 year old and turned out at youth level for Llandudno Junction, Llandudno Junction and Conwy United. He played in the Rhyl team that won the Welsh Amateur Cup in 1973.

Williamns then signed for Preston North End under the management of Bobby Charlton, playing alongside the likes of Nobby Stiles, Francis Burns, Mark Lawrenson, David Sadler and Tony Morley. With first team opportunities limited he joined Telford United, and although mainly an understudy to Kevin Charlton, he was part of several good cup runs including the 1985 FA Cup team that played against Everton.

== Coaching career ==
Initially becoming a goalkeeping coach at Non-League Shifnal Town and later moved on to similar roles at Northampton Town, Wolverhampton Wanderers and Shrewsbury Town. He also spent a brief spell as a guest trainer for S.S. Lazio before working under Chris Kamara at Bradford City.

Williams joined the coaching staff at Premier League side Sunderland under Peter Reid and spent six seasons with before joining Billy Davies at Derby County Preston North End and Nottingham Forest

Williams worked closely with a number of recognised goalkeepers such as Andy Lonergan, Thomas Sorenson, Bernard Lama, Lee Camp, Karl Darlow. and Mark Schwarzer.

On 21 December 2020, Williams joined the coaching staff at Grimsby Town under Ian Holloway but resigned two days later alongside him following a 2–1 home defeat to Bradford City.
