= Mike Leadbetter =

England international rugby union & league footballer

- Born: Michael Maurice Leadbetter; 25 July 1946 Southport, England
- Died: 17 April 2009 (aged 62)
- Height: 6 ft 4 in (1.93 m)
- School: Ladybarn
- University: Manchester College of Art and Design; Manchester University
- Occupation: Director of Social Services

Rugby union career
- Position: Lock
Senior career
Years	Team	Apps	(Points)
–	Broughton Park		
–	Lancashire		
1972	North West Counties		
–	Barbarian F.C.		
International career
Years	Team	Apps	(Points)
1970	England	1	
- Rugby league career

Playing information
Club
Years	Team	Pld	T	G	FG	P
	Rochdale Hornets

Michael Maurice Leadbetter (1946–2009) was a rugby union international and rugby league player, who represented England in 1970.

== Early life ==
Mike Leadbetter was born on 25 July 1946 in Southport. He attended Ladybarn, a local secondary modern school, and left in 1961 aged 15, without qualifications. After a few years he began his first career in printing and followed this through a series apprenticeships leading to a diploma in management and print technology from Manchester College of Art and Design.

== Rugby career ==
Leadbetter played his club rugby for Broughton Park, and made his international début on 18 April 1970 at Colombes in the France vs England match. Along with Broughton Park team mate Tony Neary, he was also part of a famous North West Counties team which defeated the All Blacks, 16-14, in Workington in 1972.

Described as a giant of a man, he also played 35 times for Lancashire. Leadbetter subsequently switched to rugby league going to Rochdale Hornets.
