= Chris Jennins =

England international rugby union player

- Full name: Christopher Robert Jennins
- Born: 5 February 1942 (age 84) Runcorn, Cheshire, England

Rugby union career
- Position: Centre
International career
Years	Team	Apps	(Points)
1967	England	3	(0)

Christopher Robert Jennins (born 5 February 1942) is an English former rugby union international.

Born in Runcorn, Jennins was educated at Rydal Penrhos in North Wales.

Jennins played his rugby for Merseyside club Waterloo and was capped three times by England. He made his debut as a centre against the touring Wallabies at Twickenham in 1967 and featured twice in that year's Five Nations, including a victory over Ireland at Lansdowne Road. A Lancashire representative, Jennins played in the 1968–69 County Championship final win against Cornwall, with his sideline conversion in the 60th minute proving to be the difference.

== See also ==
- List of England national rugby union players
