= Peter Williams (English footballer) =

English footballer (1931–2021)

Personal information
- Full name: Peter John Williams
- Date of birth: 21 October 1931
- Place of birth: Nottingham, England
- Date of death: 13 July 2021 (aged 89)
- Place of death: Nottinghamshire, England
- Position: Right winger

Senior career*
Years	Team	Apps	(Gls)
- South Normanton Athletic
1952–1953	Derby County	2	(0)
1954–1955	Boston United		
1955–1956	Chesterfield	13	(4)
1963–1964	Arnold		
Total		15	(4)
- * Club domestic league appearances and goals

Peter John Williams (21 October 1931 – 13 July 2021) was an English professional footballer who played in the Football League as a winger. Williams died in Nottinghamshire on 13 July 2021, at the age of 89.

== Sources ==
- Peter Williams at Post War English & Scottish Football League A–Z Player's Transfer Database
