= Peter Williams (footballer, born 1960) =

Welsh association football player

Personal information
- Full name: Peter Wesley Williams
- Date of birth: 17 May 1960 (age 66)
- Place of birth: Hawarden, Wales
- Position: Forward

Youth career
- Wrexham

Senior career*
Years	Team	Apps	(Gls)
1978–1981	Wrexham	10	(1)
- Bangor City
- * Club domestic league appearances and goals

Peter Wesley Williams (born 17 May 1960) is a Welsh former professional footballer who played as a forward. He made appearances in the English Football League for Wrexham. He also played for Bangor City.
