= Ronan Kearney =

Irish rugby union player

- Full name: Ronan Kieran Kearney
- Born: 3 May 1957 (age 69) Kilkenny, Ireland
- Height: 6 ft 3 in (191 cm)

Rugby union career
- Position: Flanker / No. 8
International career
Years	Team	Apps	(Points)
1982–86	Ireland	4	(0)

Ronan Kieran Kearney (born 5 March 1957) is an Irish former international rugby union player.

A farmer from County Kilkenny, Kearney played his rugby with Kilkenny RFC, Wanderers and Leinster.

Kearney won four Ireland caps as a back-rower during the 1980s. His debut came as an injury replacement for Willie Duggan, another Kilkenny product, in Ireland's final 1982 Five Nations fixture against France in Paris. He played against the Wallabies at Lansdowne Road in 1984 and featured twice in the 1986 Five Nations.

== See also ==
- List of Ireland national rugby union players
