= Hamish Keith (rugby union) =

- Full name: George James Keith
- Born: 11 September 1939 (age 87)

Rugby union career
- Position: Wing
International career
Years	Team	Apps	(Points)
1968	Scotland	2	(3)

George James "Hamish" Keith (born 11 September 1939) is a Scottish former international rugby union player.

A wing three-quarter, Keith played rugby in London for Wasps and represented Middlesex.

Keith was capped twice on the wing for Scotland in 1968. He scored a try on debut in Scotland's Five Nations opener against France at Murrayfield and retained his place for their next match in Cardiff. A fractured cheekbone, suffered while training, then ruled Keith out of the remainder of the tournament.

== See also ==
- List of Scotland national rugby union players
