= Peter D. Williams =

United States Marine Corps general

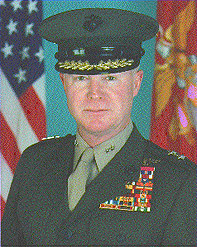
- Born: November 13, 1939 (age 86)
- Alma mater: Cornell University (1963)
- Spouse: Mary Hardie (m. 1963)
- Children: Crickett Williams Lindgren; Carrie Williams Sullivan
- Military career
- Allegiance: United States of America
- Branch: United States Marine Corps
- Service years: 1963-1997
- Rank: Major General
- Commands: VMA-542; Marine Corps Air Bases, Western Area; Inspector General, USMC
- Conflicts: Vietnam War
- Awards: Legion of Merit; Distinguished Flying Cross

Major General Peter D. Williams (also known as Drax Williams; born November 15, 1939) is a retired United States Marine Corps general and an aviator. He served as the Inspector General of the United States Marine Corps in his last command.

== Biography ==
Peter D. Williams, originally a native of Geneva, New York, was raised in Bermuda where his father edited the Bermudian magazine. He graduated from Cornell University in 1963. On September 2, 1963, Williams married fellow Cornell graduate Mary Hardie. They have two daughters, Crickett Williams Lindgren and Carrie Williams Sullivan.

=== Early USMC career ===
After college graduation, he was commissioned a second lieutenant in the U.S. Marine Corps. After completing The Basic School at Marine Corps Base Quantico, Virginia, and flight training he was designated a Naval Aviator in October 1965.

Williams then flew the F-8 Crusader at Marine Corps Air Station Kaneohe Bay, Hawaii for two years before joining VMF(AW)-235, flying the F-8E Crusader from Da Nang in the Republic of Vietnam. In April 1968, he reported to 1st Battalion, 3rd Marines, on the Demilitarized Zone as Air Liaison Officer and in September of that year, completed his first combat tour. Returning from overseas, he was assigned for two years as Flight Instructor at Chase Field, Texas.

=== 1970s ===
Ordered back to Quantico, he attended the Amphibious Warfare School, and in February 1971, reported for temporary duty to Headquarters Marine Corps, Washington, D.C., for duty as Special Project Officer (Harrier)/Liaison to U.S. Government Accounting Office. In August 1971, he transferred to Marine Corps Air Station Yuma, Arizona, for duty as Flight Instructor in the A-4 Skyhawk.

During September 1972, he returned to the Republic of Vietnam where he joined MAG-12 flying A-4s at Bien Hoa. During his second combat tour he served as MAG-12's Aviation Safety Officer, then as the Operations Officer of VMA-211, flying over 300 combat missions.

Returning in August 1973, General Williams joined newly recommissioned VMA-231 at Marine Corps Air Station Cherry Point, North Carolina, where he flew the AV-8A Harrier and served as Operations Officer until March 1975 when he was posted for two years as Officer in Charge of VMA-513 Detachment A with seven Harriers assigned. The primary mission of this detachment was to publicly demonstrate the combat capability of the Harrier. In June 1977 he reported to Landing Force Training Command at Little Creek, Va., as Head, Aviation Section, Supporting Arms Branch.

In August 1979 he attended the Armed Forces Staff College and subsequently was assigned to Marine Aircraft Group 32, Marine Corps Air Station Cherry Point, North Carolina, where he assumed command of VMA-542.

=== 1980s to present ===
After two years, he received orders to the NATO Defense College in Rome, Italy and following that tour was assigned in February 1982 as Chief of Plans, Headquarters, Fleet Marine Force, Europe in London. He departed Europe in June 1985 for two years as Commanding Officer, Marine Aircraft Group 12 at Marine Corps Air Station Iwakuni, Japan where he flew the A-4, A-6 and A-7 aircraft.

In 1987, he transferred to the Naval Space Command at Dahlgren, Virginia, as Deputy Commander. He was selected in November 1988 for promotion to brigadier general and assigned duty as the Legislative Assistant to the Commandant of the Marine Corps/Director of Public Affairs, Headquarters Marine Corps in August 1989. General Williams served in this capacity until July 1991, when he was assigned as Commander, Marine Corps Air Bases, Western Area. This command included Marine Corps Air Station El Toro, Marine Corps Air Station Tustin, and Marine Corps Air Station Camp Pendleton in California, as well as Marine Corps Air Station Yuma, Arizona. He served in this capacity for four years until he assumed his position as Inspector General of the Marine Corps in July 1995. He retired from the Marine Corps in 1997.

== Awards and medals ==
General Williams' decorations include:

Naval Aviator Badge
1st Row		Legion of Merit		
2nd Row	Distinguished Flying Cross	Meritorious Service Medal	Air Medal w/ Strike/Flight numeral "22"	Navy and Marine Corps Commendation Medal w/ valor device
3rd Row	Navy and Marine Corps Achievement Medal w/ valor device	Combat Action Ribbon	Navy Presidential Unit Citation w/ 1 service star	Navy Unit Commendation
4th Row	Navy Meritorious Unit Commendation w/ 2 service stars	Marine Corps Good Conduct Medal	National Defense Service Medal w/ 1 service star	Armed Forces Expeditionary Medal
5th Row	Vietnam Service Medal w/ 3 service stars	Navy Sea Service Deployment Ribbon w/ 2 service stars	Arctic Service Ribbon	Navy & Marine Corps Overseas Service Ribbon w/ 3 service stars
6th Row	Vietnam Gallantry Cross w/ silver star	Vietnam Gallantry Cross unit citation	Vietnam Civil Actions unit citation	Vietnam Campaign Medal
