= Kevin O'Brien (rugby union) =

Irish rugby union player (born 1955)

- Born: Kevin Anthony O'Brien; 5 June 1955 (age 71) Manchester

Rugby union career
- Position: Fullback
Senior career
Years	Team	Apps	(Points)
1979 to Present	Broughton Park		
1979	North of England		
International career
Years	Team	Apps	(Points)
1980-1981	Ireland	3	(4)
1980	World XV	1	

Kevin O'Brien (born 1955) is a former rugby union international who represented Ireland from 1980 to 1981.

== Early life ==
O'Brien was born on 5 June 1955 in Manchester.

== Rugby union career ==
O'Brien played club rugby for Broughton Park and made his international debut on 19 January 1980 at Twickenham in the England vs Ireland match that was won by England 24-9. He later toured South Africa with Ireland in 1981. He came on against South Africa as a reserve in the 23-15 loss at Newlands Stadium, Cape Town. He was selected to start against South Africa in Durban at Kings Park Stadium. In that final match O'Brien scored a try, but Ireland narrowly lost 12 points to 10. He was a member of the famous North team which beat the All Blacks at Otley on 17 November 1979. He was one of four Broughton Park players in this side and was joined by teammates Tony Neary, Tony Bond in the centre and Jim Sydall in the second row. He also played for a World XV on 9 August 1980 against Argentina in Buenos Aires, losing 36-22.
