= Virginia Secretary of Veterans Affairs =

Secretary of Veterans and Defense Affairs of Virginia
- Seal of the Commonwealth of Virginia

- Flag of Virginia

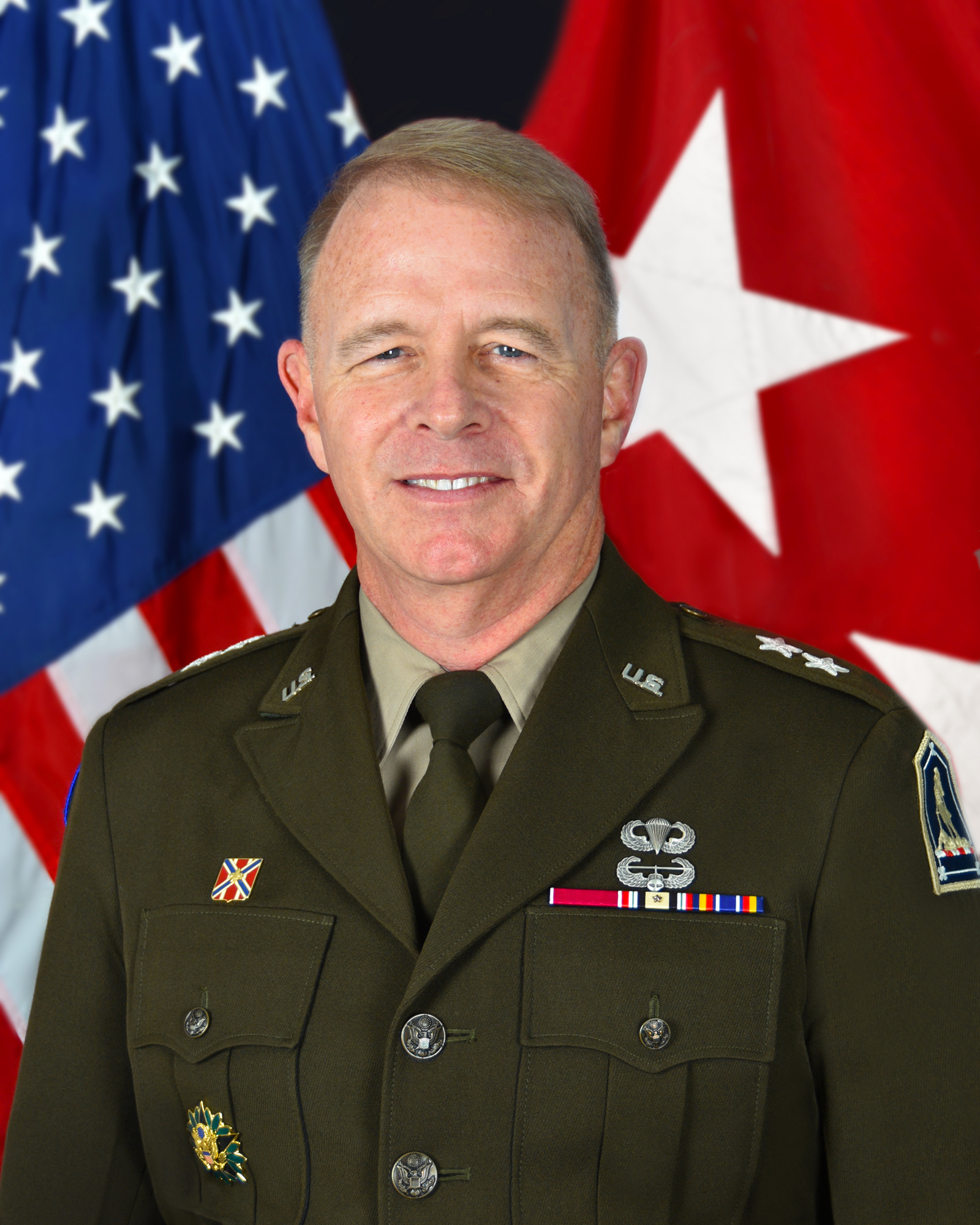
- Incumbent; Timothy P. Williams since January 17, 2026
- Style: Mr. Secretary
- Member of: Virginia Governor's Cabinet
- Nominator: The governor
- Appointer: The governor with advice and consent from the Senate and House
- Term length: 4 years
- Inaugural holder: Terrie Suit (as Secretary of Veterans Affairs and Homeland Security)
- Formation: 2010
- Website: vada.virginia.gov

The secretary of veterans and defense affairs is a member of the Virginia Governor's Cabinet. It was created by Governor Bob McDonnell in 2010 to succeed the position of Assistant to the Governor for Commonwealth Preparedness. It was referred to as the "secretary of veterans affairs and homeland security" until 2014, when most homeland security responsibilities were transferred to the secretary of public safety and homeland security. The office is currently held by retired Major General Timothy P. Williams, who succeeded Craig Crenshaw in 2026.

== List of secretaries ==
Prior to the establishment of the Secretariat of Veterans Affairs and Homeland Security, there existed an assistant to the governor, which itself emerged from Governor Jim Gilmore's Virginia Preparedness and Security Panel created after the September 11 terrorist attacks.

=== Veterans affairs and homeland security ===
No.	Name	Took office	Left office	Governor(s)
1	Terrie Suit	April 6, 2011	September 23, 2013	Bob McDonnell
2	James W. Hopper	September 23, 2013	January 11, 2014	Bob McDonnell
3	John C. Harvey Jr.	January 11, 2014	April 2, 2014	Terry McAuliffe
=== Veterans and defense affairs ===
No.	Name	Took office	Left office	Governor(s)
3	John C. Harvey Jr.	April 2, 2014	September 1, 2017	Terry McAuliffe
4	Carlos Hopkins	September 1, 2017	January 2021	Terry McAuliffe; Ralph Northam
5	Craig Crenshaw	February 2022	January 17, 2026	Glenn Youngkin
6	Timothy P. Williams	January 17, 2026		Abigail Spanberger
