= Tony Neary =

British Lions & England international rugby union player

- Born: Anthony Neary; 25 November 1948 (age 77) Manchester, Lancashire, England
- School: De La Salle College, Salford
- University: Liverpool University

Rugby union career
- Position: Flanker
Amateur team(s)
Years	Team	Apps	(Points)
- Broughton Park
- Barbarian F.C.
- Lancashire
1972	North West Counties		
1979	North of England		
International career
Years	Team	Apps	(Points)
1971–1980	England	43	(19)
1977	British Isles	1	(0)

Anthony Neary (born 25 November 1948) is a former England international rugby union player. He represented England at U18s basketball as well as rugby. He attended De La Salle College in Pendleton, Salford and Liverpool University before qualifying as a solicitor.

== Rugby career ==
Neary played club rugby for Broughton Park. An open-side wing-forward whose international career ran from 1971 to 1980, his 43 appearances for the England team were a record (subsequently beaten) at the time of his retirement. He captained England in seven international matches between March 1975 and March 1976, played for the Barbarians, and toured twice with the British and Irish Lions - to South Africa in 1974 and New Zealand in 1977, playing one international. He was a member of the famous North team which beat the All Blacks at Otley on 17 November 1979. He was one of four Broughton Park players in this side and was joined by teammates Kevin O’Brien at full back, Tony Bond in the centre and Jim Sydall in the second row. Along with Broughton Park team mate Mike Leadbetter, he was also part of a famous North West Counties team which defeated the All Blacks, 16-14, in Workington in 1972.

== Conviction ==
Neary was jailed for five years for theft in February 1998 after admitting stealing money from a trust fund of millionaire friend John Gorna. After his release, he commented that "I don't follow rugby any more, I'm just looking to get on with my life."

Sporting positions
Preceded by Fran Cotton	English National Rugby Union Captain; 1975	Succeeded by John Pullin
Preceded by John Pullin	English National Rugby Union Captain; 1976	Succeeded by Roger Uttley
