= Barry Jackson (rugby union) =

England international rugby union player (1937–2019)

- Born: 9 August 1937 Manchester, England
- Died: 7 October 2019 (aged 82)

Rugby union career
- Position: Prop
Senior career
Years	Team	Apps	(Points)
- Broughton Park
- Lancashire
International career
Years	Team	Apps	(Points)
1970	England	2	(0)

Barry K. Jackson (9 August 1937 – 7 October 2019) was a rugby union international who represented England in 1970.

== Rugby union career ==
Jackson was born in Manchester. He played his club rugby for Broughton Park and made his international debut on 21 March 1970 at Murrayfield in the Scotland vs England match. He played his final match for England on 18 April 1970 at Colombes in the France vs England match. Both matches ended in a loss for England. He also captained Lancashire.

== Death ==
He died on 7 October 2019, at the age of 82.
