= Fred F. Castle Jr. =

United States Air Force general

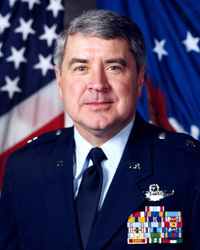
- Official United States Air Force photograph of Brig. Gen. Fred Castle
- Allegiance: United States
- Branch: United States Air Force
- Rank: Brigadier General
- Commands: Air Force Reserve Command; 337th Airlift Squadron
- Conflicts: Vietnam War
- Education: University of Missouri

Fred F. Castle Jr. is a retired brigadier general in the United States Air Force Reserve Command.

== Career ==
Castle joined the Air Force Reserve in 1967 and was assigned to Scott Air Force Base. In 1969, he transferred to Richards-Gebaur Air Force Base.

After serving in the Vietnam War, Castle served as a Lockheed C-130 Hercules instructor pilot in Milwaukee, Wisconsin from 1978 to 1980 and as an evaluator pilot in Hampden County, Massachusetts. In 1987, he became a flight commander in the 337th Airlift Squadron. After later serving as Chief Pilot and Operations Officer, he assumed command of the 337th in 1994. While with the 337th, Castle served in the Gulf War.

In 1996, Castle was named a special assistant to the Commander, Twenty-Second Air Force. The following year, he was stationed in Norfolk, Virginia. He would later serve as a mobilization assistant to the Deputy Assistant Secretary of the Air Force for Acquisition from 1998 until 2003, when he was assigned to The Pentagon. There, he served as a mobilization assistant to the Director, Air Force Strategic Planning, Deputy Chief of Staff for Plans and Programs before retiring in 2006.

Awards he received include the Defense Superior Service Medal, the Defense Meritorious Service Medal, the Meritorious Service Medal, the Air Medal, the Aerial Achievement Medal, the Air Force Commendation Medal, the Outstanding Unit Award with oak leaf cluster, the Organizational Excellence Award with oak leaf cluster, the Combat Readiness Medal with silver oak leaf cluster and three bronze oak leaf clusters, the Air Force Good Conduct Medal, the Air Reserve Forces Meritorious Service Medal, the National Defense Service Medal with two service stars, the Southwest Asia Service Medal with three service stars, the Global War on Terrorism Service Medal, the Humanitarian Service Medal, the Air Force Longevity Service Award with silver oak leaf cluster and three bronze oak leaf clusters, the Armed Forces Reserve Medal with mobilization device with award numeral 3, the Small Arms Expert Marksmanship Ribbon, the Air Force Training Ribbon, the Vietnam Gallantry Cross, the Kuwait Liberation Medal (Kuwait) and the Kuwait Liberation Medal (Saudi Arabia).

== Education ==
- B.S. and M.S., electrical engineering – University of Missouri
