= Jim Syddall =

England international rugby union player

- Full name: James Paul Syddall
- Born: 7 March 1956 (age 70) Barton, England

Rugby union career
- Position: Lock
International career
Years	Team	Apps	(Points)
1982–84	England	2	(0)

James Paul Syddall (born 7 March 1956) is an English former rugby union international who represented England in two Test matches during the 1980s.

Syddall, a Waterloo player, made his Test debut against Ireland at Twickenham in 1982, as starting lock for an injured Bill Beaumont. He was ineligible for further caps in 1983 after being sent off in a domestic game but returned to the lineup in 1984 to play Australia at Twickenham, which would be his final international appearance.

== See also ==
- List of England national rugby union players
