= Broughton Park RUFC =

English rugby union club, based in Chorlton-cum-Hardy, Greater Manchester

(England) Broughton Park
- Full name: Broughton Park Football Club
- Union: Lancashire RFU
- Founded: 1882; 144 years ago
- Location: Chorlton-cum-Hardy Manchester, England
- Ground: Hough End
- Chairman: Jim Rochford
- Director of Rugby: Alan Marsland
- Coach: Graham Higginbotham / Mark Poole
- Captain: Patrick O'Donnell
- League: North 1 West
- 2019–20: 11th
Team kit

Official website
- broughtonparkfc.rfu.club

Broughton Park FC, is one of the oldest rugby union clubs in England and was established in 1882, just one year after the Lancashire County Rugby Football Union was founded and eleven years after the formation of the national Rugby Football Union. The first XV played in Counties 1 ADM Lancashire & Cheshire, a seventh level league in the English league system. The women's team play in the Women's National Challenge 1 a fourth level league in the English league system.

== History ==
Broughton Park was established in 1882 and despite this early beginning was the third Broughton based rugby club, after Broughton RUFC (1862) and Broughton Rangers (1877). The club was overshadowed in terms of international representation by its two neighbours for the first decade of its existence. In 1919, just after the First World War, it started to make a mark on the national scene with A M Crook becoming both the Lancashire Union president and also being elected to the presidency of the Rugby Football Union. J E Kidd was elected Lancashire president in 1930 and it was not until the 1960s that Broughton once again came to the fore. The glory days of the club were in the 1960s and 1970s and at one point they fielded four internationals on the pitch. In this period they also had two more Lancashire presidents and in 1981 in John Burgess they had a president of the Rugby Football Union. Broughton Park were never able to recapture the heights of this period, and in the professional era have not managed to reach the top flight.

== Club honours ==
- Courage National Division 4 North champions: 1989–90
- South Lancs/Cheshire 1 champions (2): 2005–06, 2017–18
- North Lancashire/Cumbria v South Lancs/Cheshire 1 promotion playoff winners: 2012–13

== Ground ==
The club has had a number of different grounds in its time, mainly in the Salford/Prestwich areas, but also in the south of Manchester. From the 1950's to 2004 the club was based at Chelsfield Grove, which had a ground capacity of around 2,000, which included 400 seated.

Since 2004 its present new facility is at Hough End in Chorlton-cum-Hardy, Manchester. Football club Salford City F.C.'s stadium, Moor Lane, was once the club's home ground. It is located in the Kersal Moor area of Salford, close to the boundary with Prestwich.

In 2026, Lancashire GAA opened the 'Centre of Excellence' at Broughton Park, consisting of two new Gaelic games pitches.

== Representation ==
Originally the club had only one senior side, but now fields four senior sides (3 male and 1 female) and supported by one Colts (U19), four youth (U13-U17) and seven mini (U6-U12) teams; a total involvement of some 330 players each week. Broughton Park F.C. is the City of Manchester's highest placed representative in the Rugby Union Leagues.

== Notable players ==
=== International honours ===
- Tony Neary, former England Captain, and British Lion.
- Kevin O'Brien, Ireland, Barbarians and Rest of the World team.
- Barry Jackson, Captain of Lancashire and England International.
- Mike Leadbetter, England International.
- Tony Bond, England Under 23 caps and full England International.
- Bert 'HB' Toft, England Captain, Lancashire.
- Dan Scarbrough, England International
- Raffi Quirke, England International

=== Other notable former players ===
- Alan Shuker, England Trialist, Barbarians and President of Lancashire RFU.
- Ron Greenall, Lancashire, Cheshire, North of England and England Trialist and Peter Barratt, England Trialist.
- John Burgess, England Coach and former President of the Rugby Football Union.
- Simon Verbickas, North of England U21 and England U21.
- Andy O'Grady, North of England U21.
- Jimmy Wilde, England Colts and a Barbarian
- Jim Sydall, in the North team which beat the All Blacks 20 points to 9 at Otley in November 1979.
- John Russell, England Colts
- Andy Taylor, England Colts
- Gary Jones, England Colts
- David Tait England Schools U17 International 2003.
- Jason Duffy England Schools U18 International 2003.
- Simon McIntyre England U18 International 2009.Sale Sharks 2009-2011, Wasps 2011-2021 and Sale Sharks 2021-present
- Bill Bevan and Glyn Parry, - co-founders of Manchester Schools Rugby Football Union
- Jamie Harrison North Of England U20 and England Counties U20 2011
- Alan Buckley, rugby league centre with Swinton, Lancashire and Great Britain
- Michael Woodhouse, New Zealand Member of Parliament and Deputy Leader of the House

=== Presidents of Lancashire RFU ===
- 1919/23 A M Crook
- 1930/32 J E Kidd
- 1963/64 V G Funduklian
- 1970/71 A Shuker
- 1981/82 J Burgess
- 1985/86 W G Bevan
- 1986/87 Dr J E Ryner

=== Presidents of the Rugby Football Union ===
- 1919/23 A M Crook
- 1981/82 J Burgess
