= Virginia Department of Military Affairs =

State agency of the Commonwealth of Virginia

Agency overview
- Jurisdiction: Virginia
- Headquarters: Richmond, Virginia
- Agency executive: MG James W. Ring, Adjutant General
- Parent department: Virginia Secretariat of Veterans and Defense Affairs
- Website: dma.virginia.gov

The Virginia Department of Military Affairs (DMA) is a state agency of the Commonwealth of Virginia in the US. Its mission is to provide "state support functions to the Adjutant General of Virginia, the National Guard, and the Virginia Defense Force to ensure their ability to support and defend the United States and the Commonwealth of Virginia." The agency is composed of the Virginia Army National Guard, Virginia Air National Guard and, Virginia Defense Force. The agency head of the department is the Adjutant General of Virginia, who is appointed by the Governor of Virginia. The current Adjutant General is Major General James W. Ring.
