= 1971 Oxford-Cambridge rugby union tour of Argentina =

Summary
P	W	D	L
Total
11	7	1	3
Test match
3	1	0	2
Opponent
P	W	D	L
Brazil
1	1	0	0
Argentina
2	0	0	2

The 1971 Oxford e Cambridge rugby union tour of Argentina and Brazil was a series of matches played between July and September 1971 by a selection of the British players of Oxford University RFC & Cambridge University R.U.F.C.

A mixed selection, formed also of many international players of British national team, students at Oxford and Cambridge universities were arranged for this tour the fourth after the historical 1948, 1956, and 1965 tours. The matches were held in Buenos Aires and Rosario.

The university team lost both the test matches against Argentina national team.

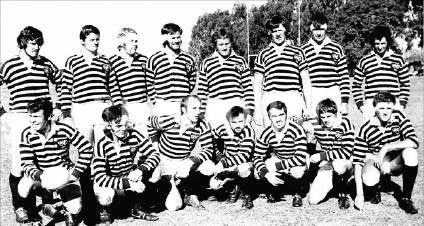
The Oxford-Cambridge team that beat Santa Fe at Liceo Militar Belgrano

== Results ==
July 1971

Brazil	8–53	Oxford & Cambridge

São Paulo

31 July 1971

Universidad de Neuquén	0–57	Oxford & Cambridge
		Try: Philips 3, Dunbar 2, Jones 2 P. Carroll, Smith, James; Witney, Hinton; Con: Saville 6 Pen: Saville 2 Drop: Williams

Colegio Don Bosco, Neuquén
Referee: César de Elizalde (Buenos Aires)

Universidad de Neuquén: M. Cecheto; D. Segovia, F. Gómez, L. Lorences, A. Buitrago; J. Blok, J. Leiva; G. Peralta, M. Kodelja, J. Escalada; O. Larice, A. Saravia; C. Silfeni (cap); H. Goncalves, R. Domínguez.
Oxford-Cambridge: P. Caroll (cap); I. Dunbar, C. Saville, P. Smith, G. Philips; J. Williams, B. Carroll; J. Redmond, W. Jones, S. James; P. Gordon, N. Witney; P. Hinto, P. Keith-Roach, A. Douglas.

5 August 1971

Cuyo	14–21	Oxford & Cambridge
Try: Navesi; Con: Candia; Pen: Candia 3		Try: Bell 2, Dunbar, R. Jones; Con: Bell 2, Jones; Pen: Bell)

Marista Rugby Club, Mendoza
Referee: Bruno Bertelli (Buenos Aires)

Mendoza: J. Castro; M. Brandi, O. Terranova, R. Tarquini, E. Gandía; C. Navesi, L. Chacón; J. Navesi, E. Casale (cap), J. Nasazzi; E. Sánchez, A. Cataneo; C. Guiñazú, L. Ramos, R. Irañeta.
Oxford-Cambridge: P. Carroll; G. Phillips, R. Jones, K. Hughes, T. Dunbar; D. Bell, J. Page; P. Gordon, G. Redmond, W. Jones; A. Rodgers, N. Witny; R. Skiner, D. Barry, N. Hinton

7 August 1971

Córdoba	9–11	Oxford & Cambridge
Try: Vaca Narvaja; Pen: Vera 2		Try: Douglas, Con: Jones, Pen: Douglas 2 Córdoba 9

Club Universitario, Córdoba
Referee: Eduardo Niño (Buenos Aires)

Córdoba: F.Mezquida; E.Vaca Narvaja, G.Pispiero, C.Antoraz, J.J.Rubio; R.Agüero, J.Vera; C.Cottorano, H.Barrea, D.Torrecillas; R.Pasaglia, R.Borsdoch; G.Ribeca, A.Paz, R.Dunn
Oxford-Cambridge: P.Carroll; G.Philips, K.Hughes, P.Smith, R.Jones; J.Williams, B.Carroll; S.James, G.Redmond, W.Jones; D.Greenwood, A.Rodgers; N.Hinton, P.Keith-Roach, A.Douglas.

11 August 1971

Tucumán	9–21	Oxford & Cambridge
Try: Nieva; Pen: C.Rojas 2		Try: Phillips 2, James; W.Jones, R.Jones; Con: Douglas 2

Lawn Tennis Club, Tucumán
Referee: Armando Zungri (Buenos Aires)
replaced by John Johnson

Tucumán: J.Vega; C.Cisint, R.Grunauer, C.Odstril, J.Rojas; C.Rojas, C.Nieva; J.Bach, J.Ghiringhelli (capt.), J.Veglia; I.Iramain, O.Ferrari; J.Olmos, M.Iramain, C.Pérez
Oxford-Cambridge: P.Carroll (capt.); G.Phillips, D.Bell, S.Saville, R.Jones; J.Williams, J.Page; W.Jones, S.Janes, D.Greenwood; K.Witney, A.Rodgers; A.Douglas, D.Parry, R.Skinner.

14 August 1971

Santa Fe	0–19	Oxford & Cambridge
		Try: Gordon 2, Hughes, Phillips, Smith; Con: Jones, Carroll

Liceo Militar Belgrano, Santa Fé
Referee: Ricardo Colombo (Buenos Aires).

Santa Fe: E.Amanzio; F.Williams, H.Lauría, G.Ibazquez, A.Eckard; B.Kreczmann, E.Tenca; A.Donet, A.Fidalgo, R.Campanella; D.Mota, P.Giardini; J.Colombo, J.Aguilera, R.González.
Oxford-Cambridge: P.Carroll (capt.); G.Phillips, P.Smith, K.Hughes, R.Jones; J.Williams, J.Page; R.Wilkinson, P.Gordon, S.Jones; N.Witney, R.Rodgers; R.Skinner, P.Keith-Roach, P.Milton

17 August 1971

Rosario	8–6	Oxford & Cambridge
Try: Mainini; Con: Seaton; Drop: Scilabra		Pen: Bell 2

Plaza Jewell, Rosario
Referee: John Johnson

Rosario: L.Huljich; C.García, C.Blanco, J.Seaton, G.Blanco; J.Scilabra, M.Escalante; M.Chesta (cap.), J.Imhoff, E.Mainnini; H.Suárez, M.Senatore; R.Fariello, J.Fradua, S.Furno.
Oxford-Cambridge: P.Carroll (cap.); G.Phillips, P.Smith, K.Hughes, R.Jones; D.Bell, J.Page; R.Wilkinson, P.Gordon, A.Jones; N.Witney, R.Rodgers; N.Hinton, D.Parry, A.Douglas.

20 August 1971

Buenos Aires	11–32	Oxford & Cambridge
Try: Rodríguez Jurado; Con: Cutler; Pen: Cutler 2		Try: Hinton, Jones; Hughes, Phillips; Con: Saville 4 Pen: Saville 4

Ferro Carril Oeste, Buenos Aires
Referee: Carlos A.Tozzi (Buenos Aires)

Buenos Aires: M.Alonso; J.Otaola, M.Rodríguez Jurado, L.Esteras, G.Escobar;C.Martínez, M.Cutler (capt.); M.Iglesias, J.Braceras, J.Carracedo; J.Borghi, C.Gomis; F.Insúa, G.Casas, O.Carbone
Oxford-Cambridge: P.Carroll (capt.); G.Phillips, C.Saville, K.Hughes, I.Dunbar; D.Bell, B.Carroll; S. James, G.Redmon, W.Jones; R.Wilkinson, A.Rodgers; P.Hinton, P.D ́A.Keith-Roach, R.Skinner.

25 August 1971

Mar del Plata	9–9	Oxford & Cambridge
Try: Sepe, Viders; Pen: Viders		Pen: Saville 2 Drop: Saville

Parque Camet, Mar del Plata
Referee: José María Cabanas (Buenos Aires)

Mar del Plata: J.Viders; D.Filippa, C.Sosa (capt.), F.Uriaguereca, G.Severino; R.L ́Erario, R.Caparelli; R.Panzarini, M.Riego, E.Feullasier; W.Heathi, D.Cordasco; R.Bonomo, M.Blanco, D.Sepe.
Oxford-Cambridge: P.Carroll; P.Greenwood, G.Redmon, S.James; M.Witney, P.Gordon; R.Skinner, D.Parry, A.Douglas.

28 August 1971

Argentina	11–3	Oxford & Cambridge
Try: Anthony, M Morgan, J Walther		Pen: Saville

Ferro Carril Oeste, Buenos Aires
Referee: Ricardo Colombo (Argentina)

Argentina			Oxford & Cambridge
Dudley Morgan	FB	15	FB	Peter Carroll (capt.)
Marcelo Pascual	W	14	W	Graham Phillips
Julio Walther	C	13	C	Christopher Saville
Alejandro Travaglini	C	12	C	Keith Hughes
Mario Walther	W	11	W	Owen Jones
Tomas Harris-Smith	FH	10	FH	David Bell
Adolfo Etchegaray	SH	9	SH	Jacko Page
(capt.) Hector Silva	N8	8	N8	Dick Greenwood
Jorge Wittman	F	7	F	Steffan James
Miguel Morgan	F	6	F	William Jones
Aitor Otano	L	5	L	Bob Wilkinson
Adrian Anthony	L	4	L	Tony Rodgers
Hugo Nicola	P	3	P	Paddy Hinton
Jose Costante	H	2	H	Phil Keith-Roach
Ronnie Foster	P	1	P	Alan Douglas
		Replacements
Luis Garcia Yanez	P
Guillermo Casas	H

4 September 1971

Argentina	6 - 3	Oxford & Cambridge
Try: Nicola; Drop: Harris-Smith		Pen: P.Carroll

Ferro Carril Oeste, Buenos Aires
Attendance: .000
Referee: Ricardo Colombo (Argentina)

Argentina			Oxford & Cambridge
Dudley Morgan	FB	15	FB	Peter Carroll (capt.)
Marcelo Pascual	W	14	W	Graham Phillips
Arturo Rodriguez Jurado	C	13	C	Steffan James
Alejandro Travaglini	C	12	C	Paul Smith
Mario Walther	W	11	W	Bruce Carroll
Tomas Harris-Smith	FH	10	FH	Christopher Saville
Adolfo Etchegaray	SH	9	SH	Jacko Page
(capt.) Hector Silva	N8	8	N8	Dick Greenwood
Jorge Wittman	F	7	F	Gerald Redmond
Miguel Morgan	F	6	F	William Jones
Jose Fernandez	L	5	L	Bob Wilkinson
Hugo Miguens	L	4	L	Tony Rodgers
Hugo Nicola	P	3	P	Paddy Hinton
Jose Costante	H	2	H	David Barry
Luis Garcia Yanez	P	1	P	Alan Douglas
		Replacements
			F	Patrick Gordon
