= John Gainsford =

South African rugby union player

- Born: John Leslie Gainsford; 4 August 1938 Germiston
- Died: November 18, 2015 (aged 77) Paarl
- Height: 1.854 m (6 ft 1 in)
- Weight: 100 kg (220 lb; 15 st 10 lb)
- School: Lansdowne High School

Rugby union career
- Position: Centre
Senior career
Years	Team	Apps	(Points)
1955-unknown	Villager Football Club		
1958-1967	Western Province	46	
1962-1963	South Western Districts		
International career
Years	Team	Apps	(Points)
1959	1959 Junior Springboks tour of South America	7	(12)
1960-1967	South Africa	33	(24)
Coaching career
- Years: Team
- 1968-1971: Western Province

John Leslie Gainsford (August 4, 1938 – November 18, 2015) was a South African rugby union player (Springbok number 348). He was born in Germiston. Gainsford played in 71 matches for South Africa (the Springboks), including tour games, and was known for being the most-capped Springbok centre until his record was overtaken by Japie Mulder in 2001.

== Early life ==
Gainsford grew up in Lansdowne, Cape Town. He was the eldest of four children. His mother, Enid Francis Gainsford, was Australian. She was a former Sydney swimming champion who came out to South Africa with her mother, when her mother was sent to South Africa to help train women factory workers for the Second World War effort. It was during this time that she met his South African father, John Cecil Gainsford, and made South Africa her permanent home.

Gainsford attended Lansdowne High School (now Windsor High School) from 1951 to 1955. He displayed remarkable versatility and unwavering dedication as a young sportsman throughout his school career, earning full colours for both rugby and athletics. His athletic prowess extended to cricket, where he represented the school's First XI. Additionally, he excelled in track and field events, particularly as a sprinter and shot putter. Gainsford's leadership skills were evident as he captained the school's rugby first team in his final year. During school holidays, he played for Villager's under-19 team. Furthermore, he distinguished himself academically as the head boy of his school, showcasing his commitment not only to sports but also to his education.

== Rugby career ==
Gainsford made his debut for Western Province at the age of 19.

He did have a break from Province when he was working for an insurance company and was sent to Beaufort West to open a branch there. In 1962 and 1963 he played for South Western Districts along with Dave Stewart who was in Carnarvon.

Gainsford was a Province man through and through. He played for them 46 times, which was a vast number in those days, and he played from 1958 to 1967 without being dropped. He was the Province captain in 1966 when they won the Currie Cup.

He wore a Springbok jersey more often than a Province jersey - 71 times in a career that included 33 Tests. When he was dropped against France in 1967, Syd Nomis took his place. When Gainsford heard the news on the radio, he immediately sent Nomis a telegram: "Say I'm sad, man, say I'm glad, man. Have a great game.”

Nice Guys Come Second is the title of his autobiography- and that says it all about both the man and the player. Winners take all, was his approach to rugby, and Doc Craven said about him, “John was one who never apologised for his belief that rugby was played to be won.”

Gainsford was known for his physical style of play, speed, and ability to break through opposing defenses. According to the cited source, these attributes were key features of his playing style.

Teammate H.O. de Villiers said of him, “John’s speed, brawn and exceptional elusiveness for a man his size were major assets, but I think the real strength of the man was his almost arrogant confidence and his incredibly powerful competitive drive. He believed there was nobody better than him and simply made it his business to transform that belief into reality.”

== International rugby career ==
Before making his international debut, Gainsford was chosen for the Junior Springbok tour to the Argentine in 1959. He scored 6 tries on the Junior Springbok tour, and in the following year, he made his Springbok debut against Scotland in Port Elizabeth. From April 1960 to July 1967, South Africa played a total of 34 International matches. Gainsford participated in 33 of these tests, missing only one through injury. This was against Ireland at Newlands in 1961. He scored two tries during the 1962 British Lions tour that contributed to South Africa's 3–0 series victory. He scored a total of 24 points for the national team. Gainsford played his last test in 1967, in Johannesburg against the visiting French team. He scored eight test tries and held the record of 33 Tests during his retirement.

== Coaching ==
After retiring from the game, Gainsford became a member of the Western Province Rugby Union executive. In 1968, he became a Western Province under-20 selector, and started coaching Villager's under-20 teams. In 1969, he became the coach for the Western Province's under-20 team. Some of the Western Province Currie Cup squad players that he coached included Springboks Morne du Plessis, Dawie Snyman, Peter Whipp, Johan Oosthuizen, Robert Cockrell, Dugald Macdonald, Wilhelm Landman, Kobus Immelmann, and Doug Claxton. In 1971, he was made a senior Western Province selector.

== Logans ==
In 1963, Gainsford went into business with friend and teammate, Dave Stewart and Jan Pickard. They bought the established sports shop, Logans (now known as "Sportsman's Warehouse") from Jack Logan. Gainsford, Stewart, and Pickard all became directors.

== Villager Football Club ==
In 1969, Gainsford and Dave Stewart founded Villager School Sevens. Their aim was to give schoolboys, playing their last game in their school jerseys, a stimulating outing that encourages those who are not going to university, to join rugby clubs and continue in the true spirit of rugby. The tournament still runs every year in September. Gainsford served as President of Villager FC from 2006 to 2010.

== Wine industry ==
Jan Pickard persuaded Gainsford to become a part of his wine business, Union Wine, in Wellington. Gainsford became an integral part of the business, especially the export division, remaining with the company when it became DGB. He worked for Graham Beck and then DGB as their international director focusing on sales and promotions. For more than 30 years, even during the times when sanctions seriously impaired wine exports, he won over the palates of wine lovers in Germany, Switzerland, the UK and Mauritius.

Even after retirement, Gainsford still did consultation work in the wine industry.

== Personal life ==
He married Shona Gainsford in 1964, and together they raised their four children in Paarl.

Gainsford died in Paarl, at age 77 in November 2015 following a long battle with cancer. He is survived by his wife Shona, children Murray, Lindsay, Kirk, and Shona-Leigh, and 11 grandchildren.

== Philanthropy ==
Gainsford's wife, Shona, said that he never turned down an opportunity to help out at schools in Paarl as coach and mentor to players, or to appear as guest speaker. He became "Uncle John" to so many boys and girls across the valley.

He also reached out to the many downtrodden people in the valley. Gainsford spent many years raising funds for Hospice. He also established a fund for ex-rugby players who had fallen on hard times, even delivering groceries to their homes.

For more than five years he had been helping homeless people living on the embankments of the Berg River, finding them jobs, helping them with IDs and other Home Affairs documents, and more.

Each Sunday he would provide meals for these homeless people, at the same time providing spiritual guidance and preparing them to make a positive impact on their own lives.

Gainsford's wife Shona said he did indeed make a positive impact on many of their lives.

She said: "There is the story of Jannie who, through this 'ministry' gave up alcohol abuse, found faith and employment, and was then able to uplift himself by moving away from the river banks and buying a wendy house to live in. He is now integrated into society. John was excited about this work which has brought about change."

"John was always a person who tackled everything he did with every fibre of his being. But above all, he was a committed Christian, a family man."

== Statistics ==
=== Test match record ===
No.	Opponent	Result	Age	Position	Points	Date	Venue
1.	Scotland	Win: 18–10	21	Outside Centre		30 Apr 1960	Boet Erasmus, Port Elizabeth
2.	New Zealand	Win: 13–10	21	Outside Centre		25 Jun 1960	Ellis Park, Johannesburg
3.	New Zealand	Lose: 3–11	21	Outside Centre		23 Jul 1960	Newlands, Cape Town
4.	New Zealand	Draw: 11-11	22	Outside Centre		13 Aug 1960	Free State Stadium, Bloemfontein
5.	New Zealand	Win: 8–3	22	Outside Centre		27 Aug 1960	Boet Erasmus, Port Elizabeth
6.	Wales	Win: 3–0	22	Outside Centre		03 Dec 1960	Millennium Stadium (Cardiff Arms Park), Cardiff
7.	Ireland	Win: 8–3	22	Outside Centre	3 (1 try)	17 Dec 1960	Aviva Stadium (Lansdowne Road), Dublin
8.	England	Win: 5–0	22	Outside Centre		07 Jan 1961	Twickenham, London
9.	Scotland	Win: 12–5	22	Outside Centre		21 Jan 1961	Murrayfield, Edinburgh
10.	France	Draw: 0-0	22	Outside Centre		18 Feb 1961	Stade Olympique, Colombes, Paris
11.	Australia	Win: 28–3	23	Outside Centre	3 (1 try)	5 Aug 1961	Ellis Park, Johannesburg
12.	Australia	Win: 23–11	23	Outside Centre		12 Aug 1961	Boet Erasmus, Port Elizabeth
13.	Britain	Draw: 3-3	23	Outside Centre	3 (1 try)	23 Jun 1962	Ellis Park, Johannesburg
14.	Britain	Win: 3–0	23	Outside Centre		21 Jul 1962	Kings Park, Durban
15.	Britain	Win: 8–3	24	Outside Centre		04 Aug 1962	Newlands, Cape Town
16.	Britain	Win: 34–14	24	Outside Centre	3 (1 try)	25 Aug 1962	Free State Stadium, Bloemfontein
17.	Australia	Win: 14–3	24	Outside Centre		13 Jul 1963	Loftus Versfeld, Pretoria
18.	Australia	Lose: 5–9	25	Outside Centre		10 Aug 1963	Newlands, Cape Town
19.	Australia	Lose: 9–11	25	Outside Centre		24 Aug 1963	Ellis Park, Johannesburg
20.	Australia	Win: 22–6	25	Outside Centre	3 (1 try)	07 Sep 1963	Boet Erasmus, Port Elizabeth
21.	Wales	Win: 24–3	25	Outside Centre		23 May 1964	Kings Park, Durban
22.	France	Lose: 6–8	25	Outside Centre		25 Jul 1964	P.A.M. Brink Stadium, Springs
23.	Ireland	Lose: 6–9	26	Outside Centre		10 Apr 1965	Aviva Stadium (Lansdowne Road), Dublin
24.	Scotland	Lose: 5–8	26	Outside Centre		17 Apr 1965	Murrayfield, Edinburgh
25.	Australia	Lose: 11–18	26	Outside Centre		19 Jun 1965	Sydney Cricket Ground, Sydney
26.	Australia	Lose: 8–12	26	Outside Centre	3 (1 try)	26 Jun 1965	Suncorp Stadium (Lang Park), Brisbane
27.	New Zealand	Lose: 3–6	26	Outside Centre		31 Jul 1965	Athletic Park, Wellington
28.	New Zealand	Lose: 0–13	27	Outside Centre		21 Aug 1965	Carisbrook, Dunedin
29.	New Zealand	Win: 19–16	27	Outside Centre	6 (2 tries)	04 Sep 1965	AMI Stadium (Lancaster Park), Christchurch
30.	New Zealand	Lose: 3-20	27	Outside Centre		18 Sep 1965	Eden Park, Auckland
31.	France	Win: 26–3	28	Outside Centre		15 Jul 1967	Kings Park, Durban
32.	France	Win: 16–3	28	Outside Centre		22 Jul 1967	Free State Stadium, Bloemfontein
33.	France	Lose: 14–19	28	Outside Centre		29 Jul 1967	Ellis Park, Johannesburg
