= 1954 France rugby union tour of Argentina and Chile =

Series of rugby matches played by the French national team

Summary
P	W	D	L
Total
12	12	0	0
Test match
2	2	0	0
Opponent
P	W	D	L
Argentina
2	2	0	0

The 1954 France rugby union tour of Argentina and Chile was a series of matches of the France national team during their tour to Argentina and Chile in 1954. It was the second visit of a French side to Argentina after the 1949 tour over the country.

French touring party arrived in Buenos Aires and then moved to Hindú Club, where the team would reside during their stay in Argentina. All the games in Argentina were played at Gimnasia y Esgrima de Buenos Aires, the main venue for rugby games in those years.

== Touring party ==
- René Crabos (manager)
- Marcel Laurent (vice-manager)
- Paul Labadie
- Jean Bichindaritz
- René Biénès (capt.)
- Philibert Capitani
- Bernard Chevallier
- Yves Duffaut
- Michel Celaya
- Jean Barthe
- Pierre Danos
- Abdrè Haget
- Andrè Morel
- Gerard Murillo
- Roger Martine
- Lucien Roge
- Michel Vannier
- Andrè Boniface
- Jacques Meynard
- Robert Bassauri
- Jacques Barbe
- Andre Berilhe
- Henrie Lazies
- Jean Benetiere

== Match summary ==
Complete list of matches played by France in Argentina and Chile:

- All the matches played in Estadio GEBA, Buenos Aires
- Test matches

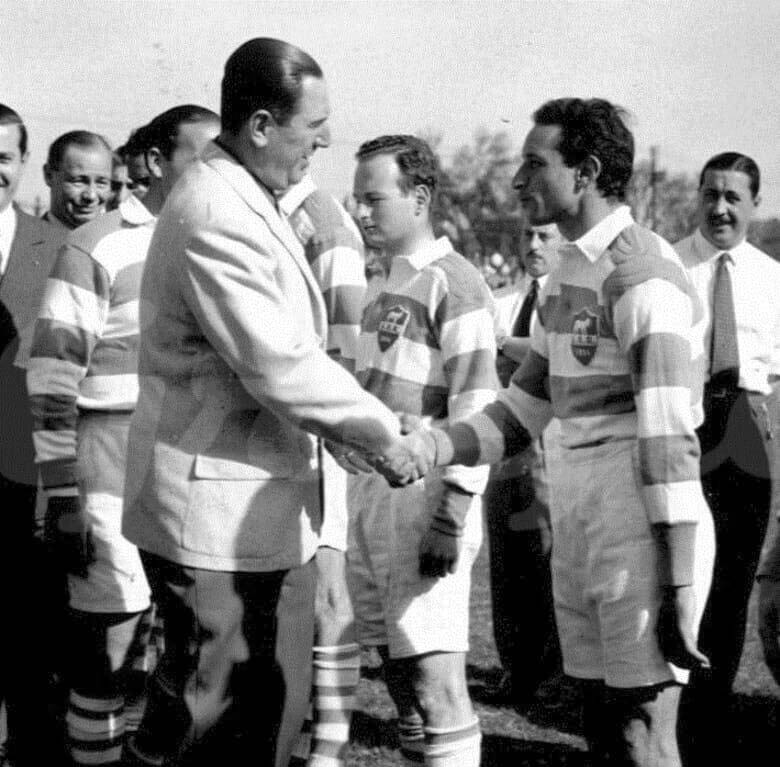
President of Argentina Juan Perón greeting players of Argentina before the test

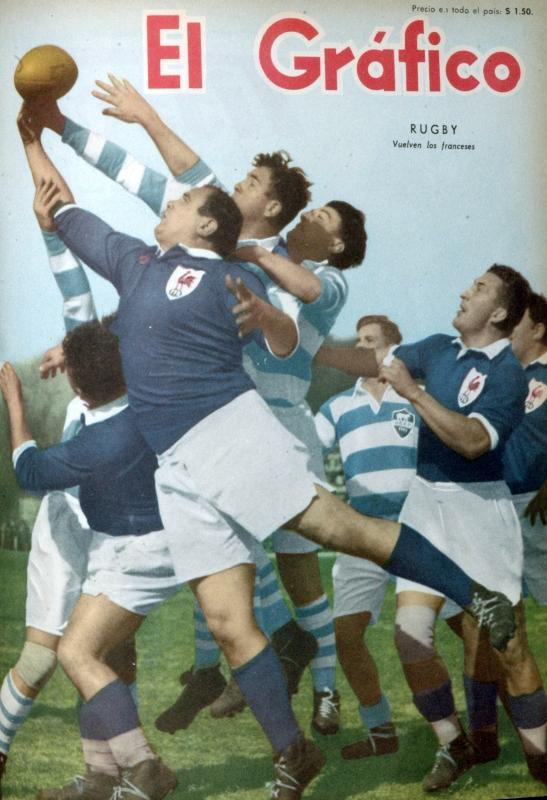
France v. Argentina test as covered by local sports magazine El Gráfico

#	Date	Rival	Score
1	8 Aug	Belgrano A.C.	29–14
2	12 Aug	Combinado A	32–3
3	15 Aug	Provincia (Note: Combined team formed by clubs of Buenos Aires Province)	16–3
4	17 Aug	C.A. San Isidro	6–0
5	22 Aug	Capital (Note: Combined team formed by teams of "Capital Federal")	15–6
6	26 Aug	Combinado Eva Perón (Note: Between 1952 and 1995, the city of La Plata was called "Eva Perón".)	22–0
7	29 Aug	Argentina	22–8
8	2 Sep	Provincia	3–0
9	5 Sep	Pucará	12–3
10	9 Sep	Capital	8–3
11	12 Sep	Argentina	30–3
12	18 Sep	Chile	34–3

Notes

Balance
Pl	W	D	L	PS	PC
12	12	0	0	229	46

== Match details ==
Legend

ADF= Deportiva Francesa, BCR=Buenos Aires C.R.C., BAC=Belgrano A.C., CASI=C.A. San Isidro, CP=Pucará, EB=La Plata, (Note: La Plata R.C. had changed its name to "El Bosque Rugby Club" by political reasons in 1953. The club returned to its original name in 1956.) H= Hindú, LM=Los Matreros, LT=Los Tilos, OG= (Old Georgian), ORC= Olivos, OS= Obras Sanitarias, SIC=San Isidro Club

8 August 1954

Belgrano A.C.	14–29	France
Try: Gahan; Con: Elía; Pen: Elía (2); Drop: Bazán		Try: Duffaut, Celaya; Murillo, Bienés; Rogé (2); Con: Vannier; Pen: Vannier (2); Drop: Haget

Gimnasia y Esgrima, Buenos Aires
Referee: Eduardo Fornés (Argentina)

Belgrano A.C.: O.Elía; L.Camardón, R.Bazán, E.Gahan, C.Lennon; M.Hughes, P.Felisari; R.Pineo, E.Arntsen (capt.), E.Moore; A.Dillon, A.Parola; E.Hirsch; M.Caldwell J.Lescano.
France: M.Vannier; G.Murillo, R.Martine, A.Boniface, L.Rogé; A.Haget, P.Danos, Y.Duffaut, M.Celaya, J.Barthe; B.Chevallier, P.Capitani; R.Bienés (capt.), P.Labadie, J.Bichindaritz.

12 August 1954

Combinado A	3–32	France
Pen: I.Comas		Try: Rogé (3), Barthe; Duffau, Bienés; Haget; Con: Vannier (4); Pen: Vannier

Gimnasia y Esgrima, Buenos Aires
Referee: R.Molteni (Argentina)

Combinado A: E.Niño (CASI); A.Caride (CASI), J.Guidi (ADF), E.Dramis (OS), C.Lennon (BAC); I.Comas (H), E.Holmgren (ORC); D.Cowan (BCR – capt.), A.Bublath (O.S.), R.Collie (OG); O.Martínez ((ADF), C.Brondsted (ORC); R.Gorostiaga (LT), V.Christianson ((ADF), R.Ferrari (LM).
France: M.Vannier; L.Rogé, R.Martine, R.Bassauri, A.Boniface; A.Haget, P.Danos; Y.Duffaut, M.Celaya, J.Barthe; B.Chevallier, P.Capitani; R.Bienés (capt.), J.Bénétiére, J.Bichindaritz.

15 August 1954

Provincia	3–16	France
Pen: Frigerio		Try: Boniface, Celaya; Murillo; Con: Vannier (2); Pen: Vannier

Gimnasia y Esgrima, Buenos Aires
Referee: J.Gutiérrez (Argentina)

Provincia: R.Frigerio (CP); L.Caffarone (ORC RC), A.Palma (CP), A.Salinas (ORC), O.Bernacchi (CP); J.Guidi ADF G.Ehrman (capt. – CP); J.Lourés (CP), M.Sarandón (SIC), R.Grosse (ORC); E.Domínguez (CP), O.Martínez ADF; C.Travaglini (CASI), H.Lambruschini (ORC), R.Follet (OG).
France: M.Vannier; G.Murillo, R.Martine, R.Bassauri, A.Boniface; A.Haget, P.Danos, Y.Duffaut, M.Celaya, J.Barthe; P.Capitani, B.'Chevallier; R.Bienés (capt.), J.Bénétiére, J.Bichindaritz.

17 August 1954

C.A. San Isidro	0–6	France
		Try: Bienés; Pen: Meynard

Gimnasia y Esgrima, Buenos Aires
Referee: J.Bony de Cabaret (Argentina)

C.A.S.I.: E.Niño; A.Caride, J.Berro García, P.Guastavino, C.Ramallo; J.M.Belgrano (capt.), F.Varela; L.Bavio, R.Aldao; R.Ochoa, W.Aniz, E.Pasman; C.Travaglini, M.Iraola, R.Lagarde.
France: R.Bassauri; L.Rogé, J.Murillo, J.Meynard, A.Boniface; A.Haget, J.Barbe, R.Bienés (capt.), M.Celaya, J.Barthe; B.Chevallier, P.Capitani; A.Berilhes, J.Bénétiére, H.Lazies.

22 August 1954

Capital	6–15	France
Try: Santiago; Pen: Comotto		Try: Chevallier, Bienés; Danos; Con: Vannier (3)

Gimnasia y Esgrima, Buenos Aires
Referee: Eric Kember (Argentina)

Capital: J.Comotto (H); J.Santiago (H), M.Hardy (AC), R.Bazan (BAC), C.Lennon (BAC), M.Hughes (BAC), P.Felisari (BAC); M.Aspiroz (OS), E.Arntsen (BAC), R.Pineo (BAC); B.Yustini (H), J.Repossi (OS); B.Grigolón (H), M.Caldwell (BAC), E.Hirsch (BAC).
France: M.Vannier; L.Rogé, R.Martine, A.Boniface, G, Muillo; R.Bassauri, P.Danos; J.Barthe, M.Celaya, Y.Duffaut; P.Capitani, B.Chevallier; R.Bienés, P.Labadie, J.Bichindaritz.

26 August 1954

Combinado Eva Perón	0–22	France
		Try: Rogó, Celaya; Berilhe, Barthe; Con: Vannier (2); Pen: Vannier (2)

La Plata
Referee: J.Gutiérrez (Argentina)

Eva Perón: C.Zaparat EB); J.Balbín (LT), C Mercader EB), A.Fernández EB), E.Vergara (LT); J.Ocampo (LT), J.Jáuregui EB); 1.Lembo EB), L.Nápoli EB), M.Morón (LT); C.Olivera EB), E.Gitard (LT); R.Gorostiaga (capt. – LT), A.Dentone EB), R.Giner EB).
France: M.Vannier; L.Rogó; R.Martine, R.Bassauri, A.Boniface; A.Haget, P.Danos; J.Barthe, M.Celaya (capt.), Y.Duffaut; P.Capitani, B.Chevallier; A.Barilhe, P.Labadie, J.Bichindaritz.

=== First test ===
29 August 1954

Argentina	8–22	France
Try: Hugghes; Con: Ehrman; Pen: Bernacchi		Try: Murillo Bienés (2); Con: Vannier (2); Pen: Vannier (2); Drop: Danos

Gimnasia y Esgrima, Buenos Aires
Attendance: 30,000
Referee: E.Fornés (Argentina)

Team details

Argentina	France

Argentina: R.Frigerio (CP); E.Caffarone (ORC), A.Palma (CP), E.Gahan (BAC), O.Bernacchi (CP); M.Hughes (BAC), G.Ehrman (capt. – CP); M.Sarandón (SIC), R.Grosse (ORC), R.Pineo (BAC); B.Yustini (H), E.Domínguez (CP); E.Hirsch (BAC), V.Christianson ADF, B.Grigolón (H).
France: M.Vannier; A.Boniface, G.Murillo, I.Meynard, L.Rogé; R.Bassauri, P.Danos; J.Barthe, M.Celaya, Y.Duffaut; P.Capitani, B.Chevallier; R.Bienés (capt.), I.Bénétiére, J.Bichindaritz.

2 September 1954

Provincia	0–3	France
		Pen: Bienés

Gimnasia y Esgrima, Buenos Aires
Referee: R. Molteni (Argentina)

Provincia: E.Niño (CASI); E.Caffarone (ORC), A.Salinas (ORC), A.Palma (CP), A.Caride (CASI); J.Guidi ADF, G.Ehman (capt.-CP); M.Sarandón (SIC), R.Grosse (ORC), L.Bavio (CASI); C.Brondstedt (ORC), O Martínez ADF; R.Follet (OG), V.Christianson ADF, C.Travaglini (CASI).
France: M.Vannier; A.Boniface, G.Murillo, J.Meynard, L.Rogé; R.Bassauri, P.Danos; J.Barthe, H.Lazies, Y.Duffaut; P.Capitani, B.Chevallier; R.Bienés (capt.), J.Bénétiére, J.Bichidaritz.

5 September 1954

Pucará	3–12	France
Pen: Frigerio		Try: Bienés; Pen: Vannier (2); Drop: Vannier

Gimnasia y Esgrima, Buenos Aires
Referee: J.Gutiérrez (Argentina)

Pucará: R.Frigerio; H.Poulet, L.Trotta, A.Palma, O.Bernacchi; H.Laborde, G.Ehrman, E.Bonfante, C.Olavarría, J.Lourés; R.Cernadas; E.Domínguez; J.Culotta, E.Dacharry; F.Ibáñez.
France: M.Vannier; A.Boniface, R.Bassauri, G.Murillo, L.Rogé; R.Martine, P.Danos; J.Barthe, M.Celaya, Y.Duffaut; P.Capitani, A.Berilhe; R.Bienés, J.Bénétiére, J.Bichindaritz.

9 September 1954

Capital	3–8	France
Try: Yustini		Try: Bienés, Lazies; Con: Vannier

Gimnasia y Esgrima, Buenos Aires
Referee: R.Moltini (Argentina)

Capital: O.Elía (BAC); J.Santiago (capt.-H), R.Bazán (BAC), E.Gahan (BAC), C.Lennon (BAC); M.Hughes (BAC), P.Felisari (BAC); E.Moore (BAC), E.Arntsen (BAC) M.Aspiroz (OS); J.Repossi (OS), B.Yustini (H); B.Grigolón (H), M.Caldwell (BAC), E.Hirsch (BAC).
France: M.Vannier; L.Rogé, A.Boniface, R.Bassauri, A.Morel; R.Martine, J.Barbe; J.Barthe, M.Celaya, A.Berilhe; P.Capitani, H.Lazies; R.Bienés (capt.), J.Bénétiére, J.Bichndaritz

=== Second test ===
12 September 1954

Argentina	3–30	France
Try: Salinas		Try: Boniface (2), Bienés; Rogé, Morel; Con: Vannier (3); Pen: Vannier; Drop: Vannier (2)

Gimnasia y Esgrima, Buenos Aires
Referee: E.Fornés (Argentina)

Team details

Argentina	France

Argentina: O.Elía (BAC); E.Caffarone (ORC), A.Palma (CP), E.Gahan (BAC), A.Salinas (ORC); M.Hughes (BAC), G.Ehrman (capt-CP); J.Lourés (CP) R.Grosse (ORC), L.Bavio (CASI); E.Domínguez (CP), O.Martínez ADF; B.Grigolón (H), V.Christianson ADF, R.Follet (OG).
France: M.Vannier; L.Rogé, A.Boniface, R.Martine, A.Morel; A.Haget, P.Danos; Y.Duffaut, M.Celaya, J.Barthe; H.Lazies, P.Capitani; J.Bichindaritz, P.Labadie, R.Bienés (capt.).

18 September 1954

Chile	3–34	France

(Prince of Wales C.C.), Santiago

Chile: n/i France: M.Vannier; A.Morel, A.Boniface, R.Basauri, J.Meynard; J.Barbe, P.Danos; H.Lazies, M.Celaya, J.Barthe; B.Chevallier, P.Capitani; A.Berilhe, P.Labadie, R.Bienés (capt.) |}
