= 1959 Junior Springboks tour of South America =

Series of rugby union matches played in Argentina

Summary
P	W	D	L
Total
13	13	0	0
Test match
3	3	0	0
Opponent
P	W	D	L
Argentina
2	2	0	0
Chile
1	1	0	0

The 1959 Junior Springboks tour in Argentina was a series of rugby union matches played in Argentina, in Buenos Aires and Rosario in 1959.

It was the second tour of the second level South African team, the Junior Springboks in Argentina after the tour 1932.

== Match results ==
(test match)

Date	Rival	Res.	Venue	City
17 Aug	C.A. San Isidro	40–3	Estadio GEBA	Buenos Aires
22 Aug	Buenos Aires CRC	38–6	Estadio GEBA	Buenos Aires
26 Aug	Olivos	24–5	Estadio GEBA	Buenos Aires
29 Aug	Universitario (BA)	42–0	Estadio GEBA	Buenos Aires
2 Sep	Belgrano A.C.	25–9	Estadio GEBA	Buenos Aires
5 Sep	Provincia	34–3	Estadio GEBA	Buenos Aires
9 Sep	Pueyrredón	32–6	Estadio GEBA	Buenos Aires
12 Sep	Argentina	14–6	Estadio GEBA	Buenos Aires
16 Sep	Rosario	81–0	Newell's O.B.	Rosario
19 Sep	Capital	19–0	Estadio GEBA	Buenos Aires
23 Sep	Deportiva Francesa	21–3	Estadio GEBA	Buenos Aires
30 Sep	Chile	73–0	Estadio GEBA	Santiago
3 Oct	Argentina	20–6	Estadio GEBA	Buenos Aires

== Match details ==
Legend

ADF= Asociación Deportiva Francesa, BAC= Belgrano Athletic Club, BCR=Buenos Aires Cricket & Rugby Club, CASI= Club Atletico san Isidro, CUBA= CUBA, CP=Club Pucará, CUR= Curupaytí, MDP = Mar del Plata RC, OG= Old Georgian, ORC=Olivos Rugby Club, OS=Obras Sanitarias, PUY=Club Pueyrredón, SIC=San Isidro Club

17 August 1959

C.A. San Isidro	3–40	(South Africa) Junior Springboks
Pen: M.Molina Berro		Try: Engelbrecht 3, Taylor 3 Holtzhausen, Hopwwood; Edwards, Bridger; Con: C.Meyer 5

Gimnasia y Esgrima, Buenos Aires
Referee: C.Ackermann ( (South Africa) - SARB)

C.A.San Isidro: J.Lassalle; M.Castex, E.Olivera, J.Lavayen, H.Broggi; M.Molina Berro, E.González del Solar; G.Wessek, F.Varela, G.Montes de Oca; A.Monticelli, L.Varela; M.Iraola (capt.), A.Iraola, F.Berro.
Junior Springboks: C.Meyer; J.Engelbrecht; C.Holtzhausen, M.Bridger, O.Taylor; S.Wentzel, M.Smith; D.Hopwood, H.Meyer, W.van Rensburg; P.Allen (capt.), P.Van Zyl; D.Holton, J.Wessels, C.Edwards.

22 August 1959

Buenos Aires C & R	6–38	(South Africa) Junior Springboks
Pen: R.Raimundez 2		Try: Twigge 2, Gainsford 2 Gericke 2, Bezuidenhout; Engelbrecht, Stewart; Hopwood; Con: C.Meyer 3, Gericke

Gimnasia y Esgrima, Buenos Aires
Referee: C.Ackermann ( (South Africa) - SARB)

Buenos Aires Cricket & Rugby Club: R.Raimundez (capt.); E.Macadam, A.Macadam, I.Mac Lennan, C.Raimundez; C.Conteponi, R.Brown, S.Hogg, M.Azpiroz, R.Macadam; R.Hogg, J.Gerlach; R.Rumboll, H.Vidou, J.Wall.
Junior Springboks: C.Meyer; J.Engelbrecht, R.Twigge, G.Bridger, J.Gainsford; D.Stewart, F.Gericke; J.Nel, D.Hopwood, J.Bezuidenbout; F.De Jager, P.Állen (capt.); S.Kuhn, J.Wessels, D.Putter.

26 August 1959

Olivos	5–24	(South Africa) Junior Springboks
Try: Salinas; Con: Rosenblat		Try: Wentzel; Twigge, Nel; Con: Wentzel, 3 Pen: Wentzel, 3

Gimnasia y Esgrima, Buenos Aires
Referee: Alberto Camardon ( (Argentina) - UAR)

Olivos R.C.: H.Rosenblat; R.Faldutti, R.Gil, L.Brisigheli, H.Houssay; A.Salinas, E.Holmgreen; A.Moreno, R.Scalabrini Ortiz, R.Cseh; C.Bronsted, M.Bertolini; C.Bello, H.Lambruschini, A.Pascual.
Junior Springboks: G.Wentzel; R.Twigge, F.Roux, C.Holzhausen, O.Taylor; D.Stewart M.Smith; J.Nel, H.Meyer, W.van Rensburg; P.Van Zyl, F.de Jager; S.Kuhn, C.Edwards, D.Holton.

29 August 1959

Club Universitario B.A.	0–42	(South Africa) Junior Springboks
		Try: Engelbrecht 3 Hopwood 2, Taylor; Gainsford, Bezuidenhout; Holton, Wentzel; Con: Meyer 3, Gericke 3

Gimnasia y Esgrima, Buenos Aires
Referee: C.Ackermann ( (South Africa) - SARB)

C.U.B.A.: C.Aldao; R.Elicagaray, J.Peters, C.Blaksley, P.Peralta Ramos; H.Videla, V.Mayo; C.Álvarez, R.Limpenny; J.Saravia; W.Bunge, J.Bortagaray (capt.); E.Gaviña, J.Etchepareborda, F.Álvarez.
Junior Springboks: C.Meyer; J.Engelbrecht, J.Gainsford, N.Bridger, O.Taylor; G.Wentzel, F.Gericke; D.Hopwood, H.Meyer, J.Bezuidenhout; P.Allen (capt.), P.Van Zyl; D.Putter, J.Wessels, D.Holton.

2 September 1959

Belgrano A.C.	9–25	(South Africa) Junior Springboks
Pen: Villamil 3		Try: Roux, 2, Taylor; Van Zyl, penalty try Con: Smith 2 Pen: Wentzel, Smith

Gimnasia y Esgrima, Buenos Aires
Referee: Francisco Lamastra ( (Argentina) - UAR)

Belgrano A.C.: M.Villamil; W.Guzmán, R.Mc.Crea Steele, A.Forrester, C.Lennon; R.Bazan, J.Forrester; B.Pearson, R.Churcholl Browne, D.Ghinson; V.Camardon, C.Hirsch, E.Verardo, G.Schon, P.Mc.Cormick.
Junior Springboks: G.Wentzel; F.Roux, C.Holzhausen, N.Bridger, O.Taylor; D.Stewart, C.Smith; J.Nel, H.Meyer, W van Rensburg; F.De Jager, P.van Zyl; S.Kuhn, J.Wessels; C.Edwards.

5 September 1959

Provincia	3–34	(South Africa) Junior Springboks
Pen: Bernacchi		Try: Wentzel, 3, Engelbrecht 2 Gericke, Taylor; Putter, van Zyl van Rensburg; Con: C.Meyer 2

Gimnasia y Esgrima, Buenos Aires
Referee: C.Ackermann ( (South Africa) - SARB)

Provincia: J.Olazabal (OG); O.Bernacchi (CUR), L.Trotta (CP), J.Guidi (ADF), E.Bianchetti (ADF); A.Salinas (ORC), E.HoImgreen (capt. -ORC); J.Pulido (ADF), F.Varela (CASI); A.Moreno (ORC; B.Otaño (CP), A.Monticelli (CASI); R.Schmidt (CP); J.Casanegra(SIC), J.Lucas (OG).
Junior Springboks: C.Meyer; J.Engelbrecht, J.Wentzel.N.Bridger, O.Taylor; D.Stewart, F.Gericke; J.Nel, D.Hopwood, W.van Rensburg; P.Allen (capt.); P.van Zyl; S.Kuhn, J.Wessels, D.Putter.

9 September 1959

Pueyrredón	6–32	(South Africa) Junior Springboks
Pen: De Carolis 2		Try: Stewart 3, Twigge; Holtzhausen, Roux; Edwards; Con: Wentzel 4 Pen: Wentzel

Gimnasia y Esgrima, Buenos Aires
Referee: César de Elizalde ( (Argentina) - UAR)

Pueyrredón: H.De Carolis; C.Aguilar, E.Karplus, E.Le Poole, C.Giuliano; A.Guastella, C.Valentini; L.Sutton, L.Migelson, G.Morris; J.Trebotich, E.Shearer; S.Pini, R.de Marco, R.Seminario.
Junior Springboks: J.Wentzel; R.Twigge J.Gainsford, C.Holtzhausen, F.Roux; D.Stewart, M.Smith; H.Meyer, D.Hopwood, J.Bezuidenhout; F.de Jager, P.Allen (capt.); D.Holton, C.Edwards, S.Kuhn.

12 September 1959

Argentina	6–14	(South Africa) Junior Springboks
Try: S.Hogg; Pen: R.Raimundez		Try: Wentzel; Taylor; Holton, Gericke; Con: Gericke

Gimnasia y Esgrima, Buenos Aires
Referee: C.Ackermann ( (South Africa) - SARB)

Argentina: R.Raimundez (BCR); E.Bianchetti (ADF), E.Karplus (PUY), L.Mendez (O.Sanitarias), C.Giuliano (PUY); A.Guastella (PUY), E.Holmgreen (ORC); S.Hogg (BCR), M.Aspiroz (capt.)-(BCR); C.Álvarez (CUBA); E.Olivera (MDP), R.Hogg (BCR); E.Verardo (BAC), J.Casanegra (San Isidro Club), E.Gaviña (CUBA).
Junior Springboks: H.Meyer; J.Engelbrecht, N.Bridger, G.Wentzel, O.Taylor; D.Stewart, F.Gericke; J.Nel, H.Meyer, W.van Rensburg; P.Allen (capt.); P.van Zyl; S.Kuhn, J.Wessels, D.Holton.

16 September 1959

Rosario	0–81	(South Africa) Junior Springboks
		Try: Twigge 4, Wentzel 3 H.Meyer 3, Holtzhausen 2 Engelbrecht 2, Allen; Nel, Edwards; Smith, Roux; De Jager, C.Meyer; Con: C.Meyer 8, Wentzel;

Newell's Old Boys, Rosario
Referee: C.Ackermann ( (South Africa) - SARB)

Unión de Rugby de Rosario: F.Cavallo; R.Mauro, J.Pellejero, A.Robson, J.Arce; G.Recagno (capt.), R.Conti; L.Barbagelata; R.Cerfoglio, R.Ponce; D.Arroyo, M.Pavan; J.Madariaga, A.Alderete, R.Alonso.
Junior Springboks: C.Meyer; J.Engelbrecht, F.Roux, C.Holtzhausen, R.Twigge; G.Wentzel, M.Smith; H.Meyer; J.Bezuidenhout, P.Allen (capt.); F.De Jager, J.Nel; D.Putter, C.Edwards, D.Holton.

19 September 1959

Capital	0–19	(South Africa) Junior Springboks
		Try: Twigge 2, Engelbrecht; Gericke, Bezuidenhout; Con: Wentzel 2

Gimnasia y Esgrima, Buenos Aires
Referee: C.Ackermann ( (South Africa) - SARB)

Capital: R.Raimundez (BCR); C.Raimundez (BCR), E.Karplus (PUY), L.Mendez (OS), C.Giuliano (PUY); A.Guastella (PUY), V.Mayol (C.U.B.A.); S.Hogg (BCR); M, Aspiróz (capt.- BCR), C.Álvarez (C.U.B.A.); R.Hogg (BCR), J.Trebotich (PUY); E.Gaviña (CUBA), H.Vidou (BCR), E.Verardo (BAC).
Junior Springboks: C.Wentzel; J.Engelbrecht, J.Gainsford, W.Bridger, R.Twigge; D.Stewart, F.Gericke; J.Nel, W.van Rensburg, J.Bezuidenhout; P.Allen (capt.); J.van Zyl; D.Putter, J.Wessels, S.Kuhn.

23 September 1959

ASD Francesa	3–21	(South Africa) Junior Springboks
Pen: Ríos		Try: van Zyl 2, Bezuidenhout,3 van Rensburg; Con: C.Meyer 3

Gimnasia y Esgrima, Buenos Aires
Referee: Eduardo Lambruschini ( (Argentina) - UAR)

Asociación Deportiva Francesa: J.Ríos; J.Tallarico, A.Quindimil, J.Guidi, O.Bernacchi; J.Dell'Acquila, E.González del Solar; J.Pulido, E.Michelstein, W.González O'Donnell; R.Khoury, G.Palou; R.Leyendo, B.Martínez, O.Cerbello.
Junior Springboks: C.Meyer; O.Taylor, J.Gainsford, C.Holtzhausen, F.Roux; D.Stewart, M.Smith; W.van Rensburg, H.Meyer, J.Bezuidenhout; P.van Zyl, P.Allen (capt.), D.Putte, J.Wessels, D.Holton.

30 September 1959

Chile	0–73	(South Africa) Junior Springboks

Prince of Wales Country Club, Santiago
Referee: C.Ackermann ( (South Africa) - SARB)

3 October 1959

Argentina	6–20	(South Africa) Junior Springboks
Pen: Guastella; Drop: Guastella		Try: Twigge, 4, Bezuidenhout; Con: Wentzel; Pen: Gericke

Gimnasia y Esgrima, Buenos Aires
Referee: Alberto Camardon ( (Argentina) - UAR)

Argentina: R.Raimundez (BCR); E.Bianchetti (ADF), E.Karplus (PUY), J.Guidi (ADF), C.Giuliano (PUY); A.Guastella (PUY); E.Holmgreen (ORC); R.Hogg (BCR), C.Álvarez (CUBA), M.Aspiroz (capt. - BCR), S.Hogg (BCR); C.Olivera (MDP); E.Verardo (bac), J.Casanegra (sic), E.Gaviña (CUBA).
Junior Springboks: G.Wentzel; J.Engelbrecht, J.Gainsford, N.Bridger, R.Twigge; D.Stewart, F.Gericke; J.Nel, D.Hopwood, J.Bezuidenhout; P.Allen (capt.), P.van Zyl; S.Kuhn, J.Wessels, D.Putter.

== Seven-a-side tournament ==
Like other occasions, a "seven-a-side" tournament was arranged. Two South African team ("A" and "B") were arranged. They came easily in the final, with the "B" team victory.

Below are the results of South African teams.

26 sep.	Belgrano	-	South Africa A	0 - 15
26 sep.	Obras Sanitarias	-	South Africa A	0 - 22
26 sep.	AD Francesa	-	South Africa A	0 - 11
26 sep.	Olivos	-	South Africa B	0 - 23
26 sep.	Curupaytí	-	South Africa B	0 - 31
26 sep.	Old Philomathian	-	South Africa B	0 - 21
26 sep.	South Africa B	-	South Africa A	13 - 10

== Final match ==
At the end of the tour, a match with mixed team were arranged. The exhibition match was played before the final of Argentinian championship (directed by South African referee Ackermann).

10 October

Rojos (Reds)	14–3	Blancos (Whites)
Try: Smith, Gainsford; Con: Smith; Pen: Smith; Drop: Smith		Pen: Taylor

Gimnasia y Esgrima, Buenos Aires
Referee: Alberto Camardon (Argentina)

Rojos G. Wentzel, F. Roux, A. Forrester (Belgrano), J. Gainsford, M. Daireaux (SIC), G. Gibelli (Club Newman), C. Smith, J. Saravia (C.U.B.A.), H. Meyer, J. Vibart (Old Philomathian), P. Allen, R. Logan (Pueyrredón), D. Holton, H. Lambruschini (ORC), D. Putter
Blancos: R. Devoto (SIC), H. Houssay (ORC), C.Holtzhausen, J. Campos (San Fernando), O. Taylor, D. Stewart, J. Forrester (BAC), R. Pla Cárdenas (SIC), D. Hopwood, H. Fernie (Old Philomathian), C. Hirsch(BAC), P. Van Zyl, S. Kuhn, S. Alonso (Gimnasia y Esgrima), C. Edwards.
