= 1965 Oxford-Cambridge rugby union tour of Argentina =

Rugby union tour

Summary
| P | W | D | L |
Total
| 11 | 7 | 2 | 2 |
Test match
| 3 | 2 | 1 | 0 |
Opponent
| P | W | D | L |
Argentina
| 2 | 1 | 1 |
Brazil
| 1 | 1 | 0 | 0 |

The 1965 Oxford-Cambridge rugby union tour of Argentina was a series of matches played in Argentina, in Buenos Aires and Rosario, and in Brazil in 1965.

A mixed selection, formed also of many international players of the England national team, students at Oxford and Cambridge universities, was arranged for an historical tour, the third after the tours in 1948 and in 1956

== Matches of the tour ==
22 August 1965

| C.U.B.A. | 12–32 | Oxford & Cambridge |
| Pen: Salinas 3 Drop: Cafferata. | | Try: Houston 2, James, Frankcom, Rosser; Con: Wilson 4 Pen: Wilson 3 |

Gimnasia y Esgrima, Buenos Aires
Referee: Federico Pfister

C.U.B.A.: C. Aldao; C. Salinas, M. Lawson, J. Eiras, J. Pego¬raro; A. Cafferata, G. Elizalde; C.Fontán Balestra, A. Sáenz Valiente, C. Álvarez; C. Teloni, J. Estévez; A. Damas, J. Dumas, E.Gaviña (capt.)
Oxford-Cambridge: S. Wilson; K, Houston, G. Franckom, D. Rosser, S. Fleming; R. Lamb (capt.), J. Dorman; J. James, B. Hadman, C. Thorburn; I. Jones, J. Harvey; E. Gould, E. Lloyd, R. Britton.

25 August 1965

| Old Georgian Club | 3–25 | Oxford & Cambridge |
| Try: Sorzana | | Try: Gibson 2, Hadman, Coley, Rudd; Con: Wilson 2 Pen: Wilson 2 |

Gimnasia y Esgrima, Buenos Aires
Referee: Emilio Aiccardi

Old Georgian Club: D. Morgan; G. Sorzana, D. Bush, G. Ed¬broke, P. Furie; J. Bush, M. Iribarne; D.Ker, A. Dunn, E. Goodliffe; E. Viel Temperley (capt.), J. Lucas; A. Castro, R, Handley, R. Foster
Oxford-Cambridge: S. Wilson; T. Rudd, D. Rosser, R. Hearn, K. Slater; M. Gibson, J. Hamp-Ferguson; B. Hadman, M. Coley, C. Thornburn; I. Jones, F. Craig; K. Webb, B. Reos, E. Gould.

28 August 1965

| C.A. San Isidro | 3–18 | Oxford & Cambridge |
| Try: Rosati | | Try: Rudd, Flemming, Houston, Frankcom, Thorburn; Pen: Gibson). |

Gimnasia y Esgrima, Buenos Aires
Referee: Ricardo Colombo

C. A. San Isidro: J. Lasalle; E. Macadam, M. Lawson, H. Rosati, C. Cornille; M. Beccar Varela, A.Etchegaray; M. Puigdevall, G. Scallan, J. O'Reilly; J. Gerlach, L. Varela (capt.); A Monticelli, N.González del Solar, E. Verardo.
Oxford-Cambridge: R. Lamb (capt.); S. Femming, K. Houston, G. Frankcom, T. Rudd; M. Gibson, J. Dorman; C. Thorburn, B. Hadman, J. James; I. Jones, J. Harvey; R. Britton, B, Reos, K. Webb.

1 September 1965

| Córdoba | 3–23 | Oxford & Cambridge |
| Pen: Paz | | Try: Slater 2, Frankcom 2, Lloyd, Fleming, Houston; Con: de Lamb |

?, Cordoba
Referee: Sergio Lozada

Córdoba: R. González del Solar; A. Quetglas, L. Rodríguez, N. Astrada, 0. Verde; J. Piuma, J. Del Valle; R. Loyola, P. Demo, J. Ramírez Montroull; J. Masjoan, R. Imas; C. Rivera, A. Paz, J. Coceo.
Oxford-Cambridge: J. Houston; R. Fleming, D. Rosser, P. Frankcom, J. Slater; H. Lamb, J. Hamp-Ferguson; H. James, M. Coley, W. Thorburn; I. Jones, J. Craig; W. Webb, A. Lloyd, H. Gould.

4 September 1965

| Argentina B | 3–0 | Oxford & Cambridge |
| Try: Cazenave |

Gimnasia y Esgrima, Buenos Aires
Referee: Francisco Lamastra

Argentina B D. Morgan; C. Cornille, J. Benzi, M. Pas¬cual, A. Quetglas; R. Cazenave, A.Etchegaray; J. Ramírez Montroull, H. Silva (capital), J. Imhoff; G. Illia, A. Anthony; W. Aniz, R. Handley, H. Cresta.
Oxford-Cambridge: S. Wilson; S. Fleming, K. Houston, D. Rosser, T. Rudd; M. Gibson, J. Hamp-Ferguson; C. Thorburn, B. Hadman, J. James; J. Harvey, I. Jones; K. Webb, B. Rees, R. Britton

8 September 1965

| Rosario | 5–18 | Oxford & Cambridge |
| Try: Rosser, Frankcom, Slater; Con: Wilson 3 Pen: Wilson | | Try: Quetglas; Con: Caballeo |

Plaza Jewell, Rosario
Referee: Federico Pfister

Rosario: J. Seaton; E. España (capitán), J. Benzi, E. Ferraza, E. Quetglas; J. Caballero, C. Cristie; M.Paván, J. Imhoff, J. Costante; M. Bouza, M. Chesta; J. Gómez Kenny, R. Seaton, R. Esmendi.
Oxford-Cambridge: S. Wilson; K. Slater, G. Frankcom, D. Rosser, K. Houston; R. .Lamb (capitán), J. Dorman; M. Coley, B. Hadman, A. Herbert; F. Craig, J. Harvey; B. Reos, E. Lloyd, K. Webb.

11 September 1965

| Argentina | 19–19 | Oxford & Cambridge |
| Try: Scharenberg, Rodríguez Jurado; Con: Poggi 2 Pen: Poggi 3 | | Try: Frankcom, Gibson, Houston, James; Con: Wilson 2 Pen: Wilson |

Gimnasia y Esgrima, Buenos Aires
Referee: César de Elizalde

Argentina: E. Poggi; E. España, A. Rodríguez Jura¬do, M. Pascual, R. Cazenave; M. Beccar Varela, L. Gradín;E. Scharenberg, H. Silva, R, Loyola; B. Otaño (capitán), L. García Yáñez; G. McCormick, N. González del Solar, R. Foster
Oxford-Cambridge: S. Wilson; T. Rudd, D. Rosser, G. Frankcom, K. Houston; M. Gibson, J. Hamp-Ferguson; J. James B. Hadman, C. Thornburn; I. Jones, F Craig; K. Webb, B. Reos, R. Britton

15 September 1965

| Belgrano A.C. | 10–0 | Oxford & Cambridge |
| Try: scrum, Gómez Aparici; Con: Rosati 2 |

Gimnasia y Esgrima, Buenos Aires
Referee: Federico Pfister

Belrano AC : J. Haack; C. Cornille, A. Gómez. Aparicio, Ro¬sati, E. de las Carreras; F Forrester, L.Gradín; R. Schmidt, E. Elowson, F. Caillet-Sois; C. Iribarne, A. Anderson; G. McCormick, G. Luchetti, E. Verardo.
Oxford-Cambridge: K. Houston; S. Fleming, D. Rosser, D. Hearn, K. Slater; R. Lamb, J. Dorman; J. Herbert, M. Coley, J. James; F. Craig, J. Harvey; R. Britton, E. Lloyd, C. Thorburn.

18 September 1965

| Argentina | 3–9 | Oxford & Cambridge |
| Pen: Poggi | | Try: Frankcom; Drop: Gibson 2 |

Gimnasia y Esgrima, Buenos Aires
Referee: Eduardo Niño

Argentina: E. Poggi; E. España, A. Rodríguez Ju¬rado. M. Pascual, E. Neri: M, Beccar Varela, L. Gradín; R. Loyola, L. García Yáñez, E, Scharenberg; A Otaño (capitán), A. Anthony; R. Foster, N. González del Solar, G. McCormick.
Oxford-Cambridge: S. Wilson: S. Fleming, K. Houston, G. Frankcom, T. Rudd; M. Gibson, J. Hamp-Ferguson: F. Thorburn, B. Hadman, J. James; F. Craig, I. Jones, Webb, B. Rees, R. Britton.

21 September 1965

| Second division XV | 6–6 | Oxford & Cambridge |
| Try: Garat; Pen: Ludice | | Try: Frankcom; Pen: Harvey |

Gimnasia y Esgrima, Buenos Aires
Referee: Eduardo Niño

Second division XV: J. Ferrer; A. Chiocconi, A. Pagano, J. Vila, H. Houssay; J. Iudice, C. Cullen; M. Ortiz, J. Cornejo Saravia, A. Da Milano; G. Salas, E. Garat; I. Lafuente; C. Massabó, H.Beltrame.
Oxford-Cambridge: M. Gibson; K, Slater, K. Houston, D. Hearn, G. Frankcom; R. Lamb, J. Dorman;C. Thorburn, B. Hadman, J. James; F. Craig, J. Harvey; I. Jones, E. Lloyd, R. Britton.

28 September 1965

| Brazil | 5–49 | Oxford & Cambridge |

?, São Paulo
