= Jacko Page (rugby union) =

England international rugby union player

- Full name: John Jackson Page
- Born: 16 April 1947 (age 79) Brighton, England

Rugby union career
- Position: Scrum-half
International career
Years	Team	Apps	(Points)
1971–75	England	5	(0)

John Jackson Page (born 16 April 1947) is an English former rugby union international.

Page was born in Brighton and was educated at Cambridgeshire High School for Boys.

A scrum-half, Page was renown for his high kicks and gained five England caps. He spent his career with Bedford, Cambridge University, Eastern Counties and Northampton. After featuring in all four 1971 Five Nations fixtures for England, he found himself dropped from the Northampton lineup by the year's end, having struggled for form since contracting hepatitis on the 1971 Oxford-Cambridge tour of Argentina. His fifth and final cap came in the 1975 Five Nations.

== See also ==
- List of England national rugby union players
