= Mannetjies Gericke =

South African rugby union player

- Full name: Frederick Wilhelm Gericke
- Born: 8 June 1933 Kimberley, South Africa
- Died: 22 October 2010 (aged 77) Roodepoort, South Africa

Rugby union career
- Position: Scrum-half
International career
Years	Team	Apps	(Points)
1960	South Africa	1	(3)

Frederick Wilhelm Gericke (8 June 1933 – 22 October 2010) was a South African rugby union international.

Born in Kimberley, Gericke was a product of Diamantveld High School and vice-captained the Junior Springboks on their 1959 tour of South America. He gained a Springboks cap in 1960 as a scrum-half against Scotland at Boet Erasmus Stadium, where he scored a try and set up two more for flanker Hugo van Zyl. His provincial rugby was played with Griquas, Transvaal and Western Transvaal. He toured Australia in 1963 with the national rugby league team. Gericke died on 22 October 2010, at the age of 77.

== See also ==
- List of South Africa national rugby union players
