= 1956 Oxford-Cambridge rugby union tour of Argentina =

Summary
P	W	D	L
Total
11	10	0	1
Test match
2	2	0	0
Opponent
P	W	D	L
Argentina
2	2	0	0

The 1956 Oxford-Cambridge rugby union tour of Argentina was a series of matches played in Argentina, in Buenos Aires and Rosario in 1956.

A mixed selection, formed also of many international player of British national team, student at Oxford and Cambridge universities was arranged for an historical tour, the second after the tours in 1948

== Team ==
=== From Cambridge University ===
- D. Richards, M. Kershaw, D. Marques, T. Hodgson, A. Herbert, W. Downey, N. Raffle, W. Evans, A. Mulligan, D. Tarsh e J. Hetherington.

=== From Oxford University ===
- : R. Allaway, M. J. K. Smith, P. Watson, J. Walker, John Currie, Peter Robbins, I. Reeler, R. Davies, T. Tallon, Onllwyn Brace, W. Lawrence, J. Abbot y A. Ramsay.

Referee: K. John.

== Results ==
Legend: ADF= Asociación Deportiva Francesa), BCR=Buenos Aires Cricket & Rugby Club, BAC=Belgrano Athletic Club, CASI=Club Atletico san Isidro, CP=Club Pucará, CUBA= Club Universitario de B.A., GE=Gimnasia y Esgrima H= Hindú Club, OG= Old Georgian Club ORC= Olivos Rugby Club, OS= Obras Sanitarias, PUY=PUY

9 August 1956

Rosario	0 - 16	Oxford & Cambridge
Drop: con2=Hetherington, Currie		Try: Robbins, Reeler; Lawrence, Watson

Plaza Jewell, Rosario
Referee: K.John ( (England) - RFU)

Rosario: J. Dogliani; A. Drincovich, J. Arce (capt.), J. Vázquez, J. Gabutti; W. Villar, N. Robson; O. Kaden, J. Watson, O. Celentano. A, Colla, A. Pava]; R. Cerfoglio, N. Robson, J Madariaga.
Oxford-Cambridge: J. Hetherington; M. Kershaw, J. Hodgson, I. Reeler, W. Lawrence; T. Richard, A. Mulligan; A. Herbert, P. Robbins, A. Ramsay; J. Currie, 11. Marques; P. Watson, R, Allaway, D. Tarsh.

12 August 1956

C.A. San Isidro	3 - 21	Oxford & Cambridge
Pen: Niño		Try: Herbert, Walker; Currie; Con: Currie 2, Hetherington; Pen: Hetherington 2

Gimnasia y Esgrima, Buenos Aires
Referee: K.John ( (England) - RFU)

C.A. San Isidro: E.Niño; H.Prebisch, M.Guyot, J.Berro García, C.Ramallo; J.Belgrano, F.Varela (capt.); L, Bavio, R.Ochoa, 1.Madero; R.Dell'Aqua, L.Allen; C.Travaglini, M.Iraola, R.Lagarde.
Oxford-Cambridge: J.Hetherington; M.Kershaw, I.Reeler, T, Fallon, J.Walker; T.Richards, D.Braco; W.Evana, A.Herbert, P, Robbins; J.Currie, R.Marques; P.Watson, R, Allaway, D, Tareh.

15 August 1956

Belgrano A.C.	8 - 17	Oxford & Cambridge
Try: Lennon; Con: Bazán; Pen: Bazán		Try: Watson; Kershaw 2, Robbins; Con: Herbert; Pen: Herbert

Gimnasia y Esgrima, Buenos Aires
Referee: K.John ( (England) - RFU)

Belgrano: A.Forrester; C.Lennon, R.Bazán, E, Gahan, E.Horan; M.Hughes, P.Felisari; A.Halle, E, Arntsen, G Schon; A.Dillon, I.Diez; E.Hirsch, M.Caldwell, J.Lescano.
Oxford-Cambridge: M.Smith; M.Kershaw, J, Hodgeon, J.Williams, J.Walker; T.Richards, A.Mulligan; R.Marques, R.Davies, P.Robbins; A.Herbert, J.Abbot; P.Wetson, N.Raffle, W.Downey.

19 August 1956

Capital	13 - 8	Oxford & Cambridge
Try: Hogg, Horan; Con: Yangüela 2 Pen: Yangüela		Try: Ramsay; Con: Currie; Pen: Currie

Gimnasia y Esgrima, Buenos Aires
Referee: Carlos M, Seminario ( (Argentina) - UAR)

Capital: R.Raimúndez (BCR) .; E.Horan (BAC), A.Dramis (OS), A.Yangüela (PUY), J.Ricciardello (PUY); A.Guastella, U, Propato (PUY); J.O'Farrel (CUBA (capt.); M.Azpiroz (OS), S.Hogg (BCR); B.Yustini (H), R, Dillon (BAC).E.Hirach (BAC), S.Alonso (GE), A.Azpiroz (OS).
Oxford-Cambridge: J.Williams; M.Kershaw, I.Reeler, T.Fallon, J.Walker; M.Smith, D.Braco; A.Ramsay, W.Evans, R, Davies; J.Currie, J.Abbot; N.Raffle, R.Allaway, W.Downey.

22 August 1956

Club Universitario B.A.	3 - 9	Oxford & Cambridge
Pen: Fernández del Casal		Try: Robbins; Pen: Curris, Herbert

Gimnasia y Esgrima, Buenos Aires
Referee: Artemio J.Chiesa ( (Argentina) - UAR)

C.U.B.A.: J.Gencud; U.O'Farrell, E, Fernández del Casal (capt.), R.Lanusse, J Ferrer; F Mayol, G.Martínez Seeber; R Mihura, C.Álvarez, J.O'Farrell; A.Díaz Alberdi, A.Conen; E.Gaviña, H.Achaval, F.Chevalier Boutell.
Oxford-Cambridge: M.Smith; M.Kershaw, T.Fallon, J.Hodgson, 1.Walker; T.Richards, D.Braco; A Herbert, R.Evans; P.Robbins.J.Currie, N.Marques; D, Tarah, R.Allaway, P.Watson,

26 August 1956

Argentina	6 - 25	Oxford & Cambridge
Pen: E.Fernández del Canal 2		Try: Braco, Davies 2 Con: Currie 2 Pen: Currie 4

Gimnasia y Esgrima, Buenos Aires
Referee: K.John ( (England) - RFU)

Argentina: J.Genoud (CUBA; O.Bernacchi (CP), E.Fernández del Canal (CUBA, R..Bazán (BAC), A.Salinas (ORC); J, M.Belgrano (CASI) (capt.), P.Felisari (BAC); S.Hogg (BCR), E.Mitchelstein (ORC), R.Ochoa (CASI), R.Dell'Acqua (CASI), J.Diez (BAC); E.Gaviña (CUBA, M.Caldwell (BAC), R.Lagorde (CASI) .
Oxford-Cambridge: M.Smith; J.Walker, I.Reeler, J.Hodgson, M, Kershaw; T.Richards, D.Brace; N.Marques, R.Davies; P.Robbins; A.Herbert, J.Currie; W.Watson, R.Allaway, W.Downey.

30 August 1956

Buenos Aires Cricket & Rugby Club	8 - 12	Oxford & Cambridge
Try: Raimúndez; Con: Fernández del Casal; Pen: Fernández del Casal		Try: Hodgson 2, Walker; Pen: Herbert

Gimnasia y Esgrima, Buenos Aires
Referee: K.John ( (England) - RFU)

2 September 1956

Provincia	6 - 29	Oxford & Cambridge
Pen: Ehrman 2		Try: Hodgson, Fallon; Evans, Herbert; Mulligan, Lawrence, Con: Herbert 3, Currie; Pen: Currie

Gimnasia y Esgrima, Buenos Aires
Referee: E.Fornés ( (Argentina) - UAR)

Provincia: R.Pesce (ADF); J.Márquez Miranda (Curupaytí), J.Guidi (ADF), L.Trotta (CP); C.Ramallo (CASI); I.Comas, G.Ehrman (capt.) (CP); E.Michelstein (ORC), M.Sarandón (SIC), J.Madero (CASI); E.Domínguez (CP), L.Allen (CASI); C.Travaglini (CASI), V.Christianson (ADF) R.Follet (OG).
Oxford-Cambridge: T, Richards; W.Lawrence, T.Fallan, J.Hodgson, J.Walker; M.Smith, A.Mulligan; R.Marques, P.Robbins, W.Evana; A, Herbert, 1.Currie; N, Raffle, R.Allaway, W.Downey.

5 September 1956

Obras Sanitarias	0 - 11	Oxford & Cambridge
		Try: Watson, penalty try Lawrence; Con: Richards

Gimnasia y Esgrima, Buenos Aires
Referee: Eric Kember. ( (Argentina) - UAR)

Obras Sanitarias: J, Salmerón; R.Brown, A.Dermis, E.Dramis, P.Quiroga; W.Cassellini, Ant.Demis; M.Azpiroz, A.Bublath, J.Rossito; A.Echagüe, J, Wester; L Echagüe, E.Verzoletto, A.Azpiroz.
Oxford-Cambridge: T.Richards; N.Lawrence, I.Reeler, T.Fallon, M.Kershaw; M.Smith, D.Brace; R Davies, A.Ramsay, J.Abbot; J.Currie, R.Marques; P.Watson, R..Allaway, N.Baffle

7 September 1956

San Isidro Club	0 - 44	Oxford & Cambridge
		Try: Davies 2, Mulligan; Lawrence, Richards 2 Watson 2, Hodgson; Robbins; Con: Currie 2, Richards 2 Pen: Currie 2

Gimnasia y Esgrima, Buenos Aires
Referee: J.Gutiérrez ( (Argentina) - UAR)

San Isidro Club: R.Devoto; J.Angelillo, F.Carlés, J.Álvarez, M.Fernández Criado; E.Elizalde, G.Soares Gache, M.Sarandón, M, Villalonga, R.Plá; L.Glastra, A.Lamas; B.Mugica, E.Jantus, R.Rodríguez Loredo. Oxford-Cambridge: M Smith; W.Lawrence, I.Reeler, J, Hodgson, J.Walker; T.Richards, A.Mulligan; P.Robbins, R Davies, W.- Evans; J.Currie, R.Marques; P, Watson, N.Baffle, W.Downey.

16 September 1956

Argentina	3 - 11	Oxford & Cambridge
Pen: Fernández del Casal		Try: Watson, Lawrence; Con: Richards; Pen: Richards

Gimnasia y Esgrima, Buenos Aires
Referee: Carlos M.Seminario ( (Argentina) - UAR)

Argentina: J.Genoud (CUBA; O.Bernacchi (CP), E.Fernández del Casal (CUBA, A, Yangüela (PUY), E.Horan (BAC); A.Guastella, U.Propato (PUY); J.O'Farrel, cap.(CUBA, M.Azpiros (OS), S, Hogg (BCR); B.Yustfni (H), R.Dillon (BAC).E.Gaviña (CUBA, V.Christianson (ADF), E.Hirsch (BAC).
Oxford-Cambridge: T.Richards; M Kershaw, I.Reeler, T.Hodgson, N.Lawrence; M.Smith, D.Brace: A.Ramsay, P.Robbins, R, Davies; J.Abbot, R, Marques; N.Raffle, R.Allaway, P.Watson.

== Seven-a-side special ==
On September 9, was played a tournament of "seven", with the participation of 23 teams of Argentinian clubs, and two selection of British played.

The final was played between the Oxford Cambridge "A" Club Pucará that won the preliminary matches. Oxford Cambridge “A”won with Banco Nación (16-0), Pueyrredón (16-0), San Isidro Club (11-0)., while Pucará won with Atalaya (5-0), (Club Universitario (8-3), Buenos Aires C&R (5-3), Oxford-Cambridge “B” (16–0).

9 September 1956

Club Pucará	0 - 16	Oxford & Cambridge "A"
		Try: Smith, Davies; Lawrence, Brace; Con: Brace 2

Gimnasia y Esgrima, Buenos Aires
Referee: K.John ( (England) - RFU)

Pucará: O.Bernacchi, A.Palma; I.Comas, L.Trotta; B.Otaño, F.Ibáñez, E.Domínguez
Oxford-Cambridge A: N, Lawrence; M.Smith; T.Richards, D.Braco; R.Davies, N.Raffle, P.Robbins
