= Charlie Cockrell =

South African rugby union footballer

- Born: Charles Herbert Cockrell; 10 January 1939 Cape Town, South Africa
- Died: 4 October 2016 (aged 77)
- Height: 1.83 m (6 ft 0 in)
- Weight: 89 kg (196 lb)
- School: JJ du Preez High School, Parow, Cape Town
- Notable relative: Robert Cockrell (brother)

Rugby union career
- Position: Hooker
Amateur team(s)
Years	Team	Apps	(Points)
- Paarl RFC
–	Noordelikes (NTK Rugby Club)		
Provincial / State sides
Years	Team	Apps	(Points)
1963–1971	Western Province	66	
International career
Years	Team	Apps	(Points)
1969–1970	South Africa	3	

Charles Herbert Cockrell (10 January 1939 – 4 October 2016) was a South African rugby union player who played three test matches for the South Africa national rugby union team.

== Playing career ==
Cockrell made his provincial debut for Western Province in 1963 and played in 66 matches for the union before he retired in 1971.

He made his test debut for the Springboks during the 1969–70 Springbok tour of Britain and Ireland against Scotland on 6 December 1969 at Murrayfield in Edinburgh. Cockrell also played in the test matches against Ireland and Wales during the tour and in a further 7 tour matches for the Springboks.

=== Test history ===
No.	Opposition	Result (SA 1st)	Position	Tries	Date	Venue
1.	Scotland	3–6	Hooker		6 December 1969	Murrayfield, Edinburgh
2.	Ireland	8–8	Hooker		10 January 1970	Lansdowne Road, Dublin
3.	Wales	6–6	Hooker		24 January 1970	National Stadium, Cardiff

== Coaching career ==
After his playing career, Cockrell went on to coach the De Beers rugby club in Kimberley and Griquas during the 1975 Currie Cup competition.

He also coached with Hennie Muller at Northerns (Connect NTK RFC) and took over as head coach after Hennie's sudden death in 1977. He regarded Hennie Muller as one of his mentors also playing as a player himself for Northerns 1st Team under Hennie as the coach.

He was also assistant coach to Dawie Snyman for Western Province when they won the Currie Cup five times in a row between 1982–1986.

== See also ==
- List of South Africa national rugby union players – Springbok no. 441
