= René Biénès =

France international rugby union player

- Born: 2 August 1923 Toulouse, France
- Died: September 2009 (aged 86) Bordeaux, France
- Height: 5 ft 11 in (180 cm)
- Weight: 197 lb (89 kg)

Rugby union career
- Position: Prop
International career
Years	Team	Apps	(Points)
1950–56	France	29	(12)

René Biénès (2 August 1923 – September 2009) was a French international rugby union player.

A native of Toulouse, Biénès was an international level javelin thrower and didn't pick up rugby until after World War II, during which he was decorated with both the Médaille militaire and Croix de Guerre. He had been involved with the French resistance and later served with the 1st Parachute Chasseur Regiment after Toulouse was liberated.

Biénès started out with SC Graulhet, before joining top division team US Cognac in 1947. His international career consisted of 29 caps for France between 1950 and 1956. He was utilised mainly as a prop and captained France on their 1954 tour of South America, where he was the team's top try scorer across all fixtures.

== See also ==
- List of France national rugby union players
