= Windsor High School (Cape Town) =

High school in Cape Town, South Africa

Coordinates: 33.9864°S 18.5008°E

Information
- Former name: Lansdowne High School (1935-1981)
- Established: 1935; 90 years ago
- Principal: Mrs D Morgan-Meyer

Windsor High School is a school situated in the suburb of Lansdowne in Cape Town, South Africa.

== History ==
First established in 1935, it moved into its present building in 1938 and was known as Lansdowne High. Its first incarnation under the old apartheid system was as a school exclusively reserved for the white population group.

In 1981 the Lansdowne High name was changed in favour of the current Windsor High School, named after the school board held an open competition to rename the school. At that stage no unanimous decision could be agreed to, then 3 years later the name submitted by an ex-scholar was used.

Having passed through the "Model C" phase (a term denoting former 'whites-only schools that opened up just before the demise of apartheid).

Windsor High is headed by Mrs D Morgan-Meyer. The school used to be headed by Phaldie Tregonning. He was suspended in February 2018 and officially removed in May 2018 due to misconduct allegations. Tregonning died in July 2018.

Windsor High offers a range of subjects to cater for the aspirations of all its pupils in the fields of sciences, commerce, social services and technology.

== Notable alumni ==
Former Springbok centre, John Gainsford (1951-1955).
