= Dawie Snyman =

South African rugby union footballer (1949–2025)

- Born: Dawid Stefanus Lubbe Snyman; 5 July 1949 Johannesburg, South Africa
- Died: 14 August 2025 (aged 76)
- Height: 1.73 m (5 ft 8 in)
- Weight: 77 kg (170 lb)
- School: Grey College, Bloemfontein
- University: Stellenbosch University
- Notable relative: Jackie Snyman (brother)

Rugby union career
Amateur team(s)
Years	Team	Apps	(Points)
1970–1977	Maties		
Provincial / State sides
Years	Team	Apps	(Points)
1971–1977	Western Province	60	
International career
Years	Team	Apps	(Points)
1971–1977	South Africa	10	(24)
Coaching career
- Years: Team
- 1982–1989: Western Province
- 1992–1993: Western Province
- 1997–1998: Golden Lions
- 1998: South Africa sevens

Dawid Stefanus Lubbe Snyman (5 July 1949 – 14 August 2025) was a South African rugby union player and coach.

== Playing career ==
Snyman represented the Free State schools at two consecutive Craven Week tournaments. After school and completing his military training he enrolled at Stellenbosch University. In 1971, before playing provincial rugby, he was selected for the Springboks to tour Australia. Although he did not play in any test matches during the tour, being selected for the team made him only the third player, after JC van der Westhuizen and Danie Craven to represent the Springboks before playing for a province. He made his provincial debut for Western Province later during the 1971 season.

Snyman's test debut was in 1972 at Ellis Park against the touring English side captained by John Pullin. Playing flyhalf, Snyman scored all the points for the Springboks in the 9–18 defeat to the English. During September to November 1972, Snyman toured with Gazelles, a South African under-24 team, to Argentina. Snyman played ten test matches for the Springboks, scoring 24 points, including one try. He also played in twelve tour matches, scoring sixty-two points.

=== Test history ===
No.	Opponents	Results (RSA 1st)	Position	Points	Dates	Venue
1.	England	9–18	Flyhalf	9 (3 penalties)	3 Jun 1972	Ellis Park, Johannesburg
2.	British Lions	3–12	Flyhalf	3 (1 dropgoal)	8 Jun 1974	Newlands, Cape Town
3.	(British & Irish Lions) British Lions	9–28	Replacement		22 Jun 1974	Loftus Versfeld, Pretoria
4.	France	13–4	Fullback		23 Nov 1974	Stade Municipal, Toulouse
5.	France	10–8	Fullback		30 Nov 1974	Parc des Princes, Paris
6.	France	38–25	Fullback	5 (1 conversion, 1 penalty)	21 Jun 1975	Free State Stadium, Bloemfontein
7.	France	33–18	Fullback		28 Jun 1975	Loftus Versfeld, Pretoria
8.	New Zealand	9–15	Fullback		14 Aug 1976	Free State Stadium, Bloemfontein
9.	New Zealand	15–10	Fullback	3 (1 dropgoal)	4 Sep 1976	Newlands, Cape Town
10.	World XV	45–24	Fullback	4 (1 try)	27 Aug 1977	Loftus Versfeld, Pretoria

== Coaching career ==
In 1982 Snyman was appointed the head coach of Western Province, with Charlie Cockrell as his assistant. During his tenure as head coach Western Province won the Currie Cup five times in a row from 1982 to 1986. In 1989, with Hennie Bekker as his assistant coach, Western Province shared the Currie Cup with Northern Transvaal.

== Death ==
Snyman died on 14 August 2025, at the age of 76.

== See also ==
- List of South Africa national rugby union players – Springbok no. 453
