= Keith Hughes (rugby union) =

- Born: 15 December 1949 (age 76) Glanamman, Wales

Rugby union career
- Position: Centre
International career
Years	Team	Apps	(Points)
1970–74	Wales	3	(0)

Keith Hughes (born 15 December 1949) is a Welsh former rugby union international.

Born in Glanamman, Hughes earned three caps for Wales. He made his debut as a winger against Ireland in a 1970 Five Nations match at Lansdowne Road. In 1973, he was recalled in his more customary position of centre to play Australia at Cardiff. His final appearance, also as a centre, came against Scotland in the 1974 Five Nations.

Hughes, a Cambridge blue, spent a lot of his rugby career in England. He was a London Welsh player and was a county captain for Surrey, leading them on a tour of South Africa. After returning to Wales in 1978, he appeared briefly for Llanelli, but soon retired from top level rugby to concentrate on his medical practice in West Wales.

== See also ==
- List of Wales national rugby union players
