= Robert Cockrell =

South African rugby union footballer

- Born: Robert James Cockrell; 4 April 1950 Cape Town, South Africa
- Died: 25 May 2000 (aged 50) Table View, South Africa
- Height: 1.83 m (6 ft 0 in)
- Weight: 95 kg (209 lb)
- School: JG Meiring High School, Goodwood, Cape Town
- Notable relative: Charlie Cockrell (brother)

Rugby union career
- Position: Hooker
Amateur team(s)
Years	Team	Apps	(Points)
- Villagers RFC
–	Noordelikes (Connect NTK RFC)		
–	Paarl RFC		
Provincial / State sides
Years	Team	Apps	(Points)
1972–1982	Western Province	102	
International career
Years	Team	Apps	(Points)
1974–1981	South Africa	11	(4)

Robert James Cockrell (4 April 1950 – 26 May 2000) was a South African rugby union player who played eleven test matches for the South Africa national rugby union team.

== Playing career ==
Cockrell made his provincial debut for Western Province in 1972 and played in 102 matches for the union.

He made his test debut for the Springboks on 23 November 1974 at Stade Municipal in Toulouse against France. Cockrell scored his first and only test try during his third test match on 21 June 1975 in Bloemfontein against the touring French team captained by Richard Astre.

His last test match, was the Springboks’ first ever test match against the USA on 20 September 1981 at the Owl Creek Polo ground in Glenville, New York. Cockrell also played in 14 tour matches for the Springboks and scored one try.

=== Test history ===
No.	Opposition	Result (SA 1st)	Position	Tries	Date	Venue
1.	France	13–4	Hooker		23 Nov 1974	Stade Municipal, Toulouse
2.	France	10–8	Hooker		30 Nov 1974	Parc des Princes, Paris
3.	France	38–25	Hooker	1	21 Jun 1975	Free State Stadium, Bloemfontein
4.	France	33–18	Hooker		28 Jun 1975	Loftus Versfeld, Pretoria
5.	New Zealand	16–7	Hooker		24 Jul 1976	Kings Park Stadium, Durban
6.	New Zealand	9–15	Hooker		14 Aug 1976	Free State Stadium, Bloemfontein
7.	World XV	45–24	Hooker		27 Aug 1977	Loftus Versfeld, Pretoria
8.	New Zealand	9–14	Hooker		15 Aug 1981	Lancaster Park, Christchurch
9.	New Zealand	24–12	Replacement		29 Aug 1981	Athletic Park, Wellington
10.	New Zealand	22–25	Hooker		12 Sep 1981	Eden Park, Auckland
11.	United States	38–7	Hooker		20 Sep 1981	Owl Creek Polo ground, Glenville, New York

== See also ==
- List of South Africa national rugby union players – Springbok no. 486
