= Johan Oosthuizen =

South African rugby union footballer

- Born: Jacob Johannes Oosthuizen; 4 July 1951 (age 75) Worcester, Western Cape
- Height: 1.83 m (6 ft 0 in)
- Weight: 88 kg (194 lb)
- School: Worcester Gimnasium

Rugby union career
Provincial / State sides
Years	Team	Apps	(Points)
1973–1978	Western Province		
International career
Years	Team	Apps	(Points)
1974–1976	South Africa	9	(8)

Jacob Johannes 'Johan' Oosthuizen (born 4 July 1951) is a former South African rugby union player.

== Playing career ==
Born in Worcester and a police officer by occupation, Oosthuizen made his provincial debut for Western Province in 1973.

He made his test debut for the Springboks in the first test against the 1974 British Lions at Newlands in Cape Town. His second test for the Springboks was against France during the end of the year tour to that country. He also played against France in 1975 and against the All Blacks in 1976. Along with his nine tests he played in five tour matches, scoring fifteen points for the Springboks.

=== Test history ===
No.	Opponents	Results (RSA 1st)	Position	Tries	Dates	Venue
1.	British Lions	3–12	Centre		8 June 1974	Newlands, Cape Town
2.	France	13–4	Centre		23 November 1974	Stade Municipal, Toulouse
3.	France	10–8	Centre		30 November 1974	Parc des Princes, Paris
4.	France	38–25	Centre	1	21 June 1975	Free State Stadium, Bloemfontein
5.	France	33–18	Centre		28 June 1975	Loftus Versfeld, Pretoria
6.	New Zealand	16–7	Centre		24 July 1976	Kings Park Stadium, Durban
7.	New Zealand	9–15	Centre		14 August 1976	Free State Stadium, Bloemfontein
8.	New Zealand	15–10	Centre	1	4 September 1976	Newlands, Cape Town
9.	New Zealand	15–14	Centre		18 September 1976	Ellis Park, Johannesburg

== See also ==
- List of South Africa national rugby union players – Springbok no. 460
