= Olivos Rugby Club =

(Argentina) Olivos
- Full name: Olivos Rugby Club
- Union: URBA
- Founded: 4 September 1927; 99 years ago
- Location: Munro, Argentina
- Ground(s): Mariano Pelliza, Munro
- President: Hernán Grosse
- Coach(es): Juan González Vidal; Juan Pérez Pardo
- League: Primera A
- 2026: 11th.
Team kit

Official website
- olivosrugbyclub.com.ar

Olivos Rugby Club is an Argentine rugby union and field hockey club located in the Munro district of Vicente López Partido. The rugby team is member of the Unión de Rugby de Buenos Aires (URBA), having won its only URBA championship in 1940. Olivos currently competes in Primera División A, the second division of the URBA league system. Olivos is regarded as one of the most representative clubs of rugby union in Buenos Aires Province.

Olivos' hockey teams are affiliated to Buenos Aires Hockey Association (AHBA), competing in championships organised by the body.

== History ==
The sporting institution was founded on September 4, 1927 as a rugby club by 20 young men joined at a land located on Avenida del Libertador 2200 in the neighborhood of Olivos, Buenos Aires. They took inspiration from the British side that toured on Argentina in 1927 to create their own club. Salvador Pineda, Julio J. Salas, José Mosé, Leopoldo Houssay, and Emilio Izasmendi (son) were the founding members.

As the club still had not an own field, they first played at Banco Hipotecario's field in San Fernando Partido. Olivos played their first official match v Club Atlético del Rosario at Plaza Jewell in 1932. The first colors used were light blue and yellow, then adopting the green. The definitive orange and black colors came later, taken from some pillows in Carlos Bowers' house. Bowers was also president of the club in the 1930s. During his tenure, he insisted on forming teams with players from the neighborhood, with no external players added.

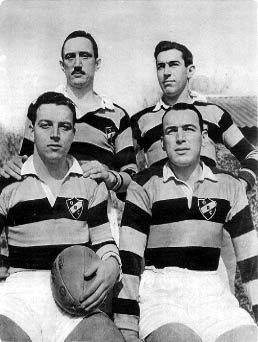
Some of the footballers that played the British Lions in 1936

In 1933, Olivos promoted to Primera División (current Torneo de la URBA) for the first time after defeating Obras Sanitarias 17–3. Years later the club inaugurated its own field (1935), located in Munro, Buenos Aires, near the current facilities, and then opened a female field hockey section. In 1936, Olivos was one of the clubs that played Great Britain during the Lions third tour on Argentina.

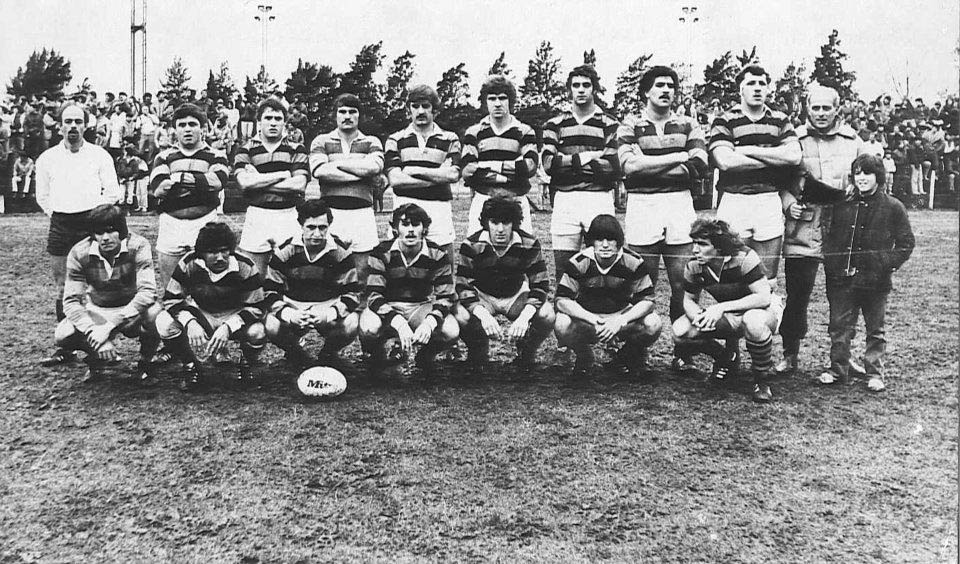
Team of Olivos that won the second division championship in 1984

Olivos finally set its headquarters on Mariano Pelliza street in Munro in 1940. The club has remained there since then. That same year the club won their only URBA title to date. In 1942, the field hockey team promoted to Primera División. In 1959, Olivos played the Junior Springboks when the South African side toured Argentina.

After some years in the second division, in 1984 Olivos returned to Primera División after winning the championship unbeaten. The team earned 14 points above the team placed second, having scored 80 tries. Since then, the club has been a constant feature in the league, fielding teams at all levels.

== Titles ==
- Torneo de la URBA (1): 1940

== Gallery ==
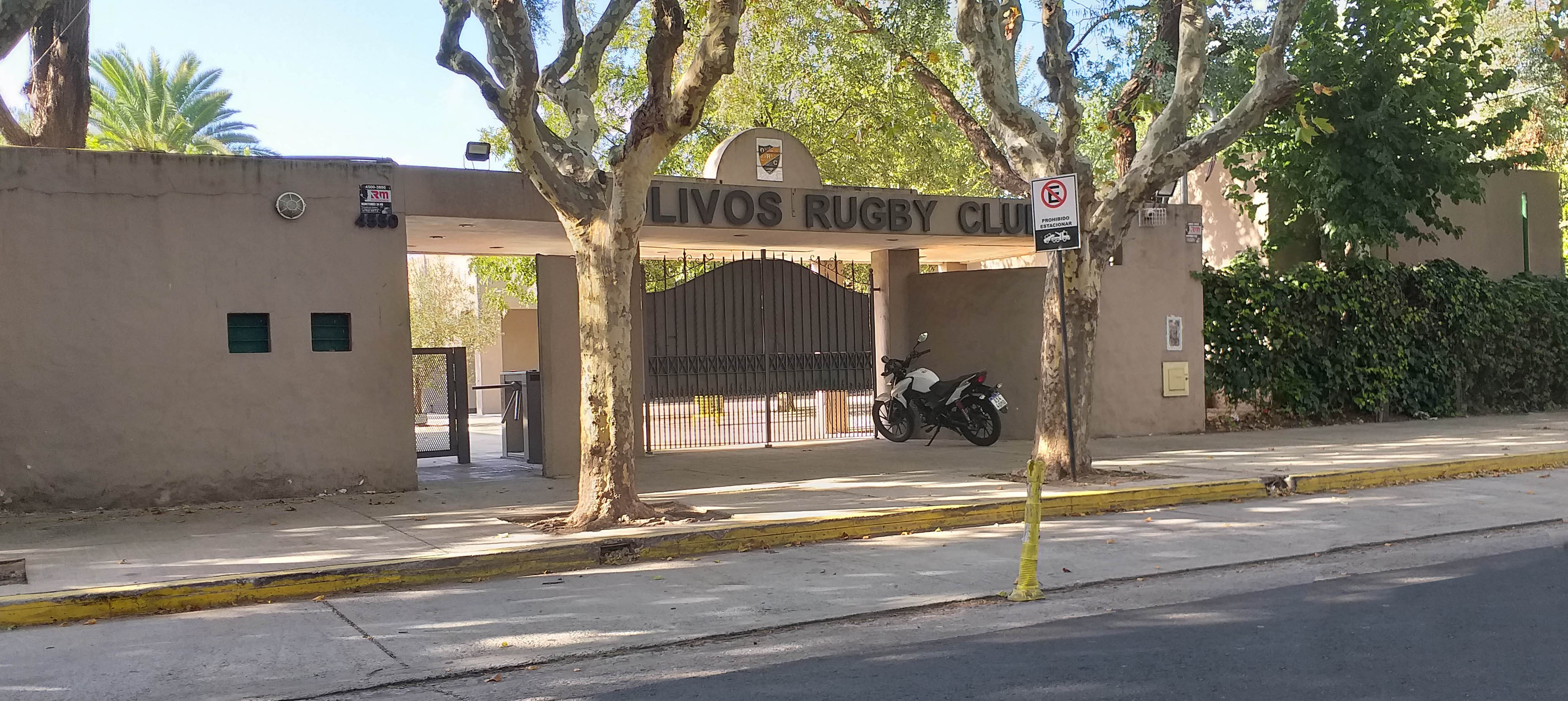
Main entrance

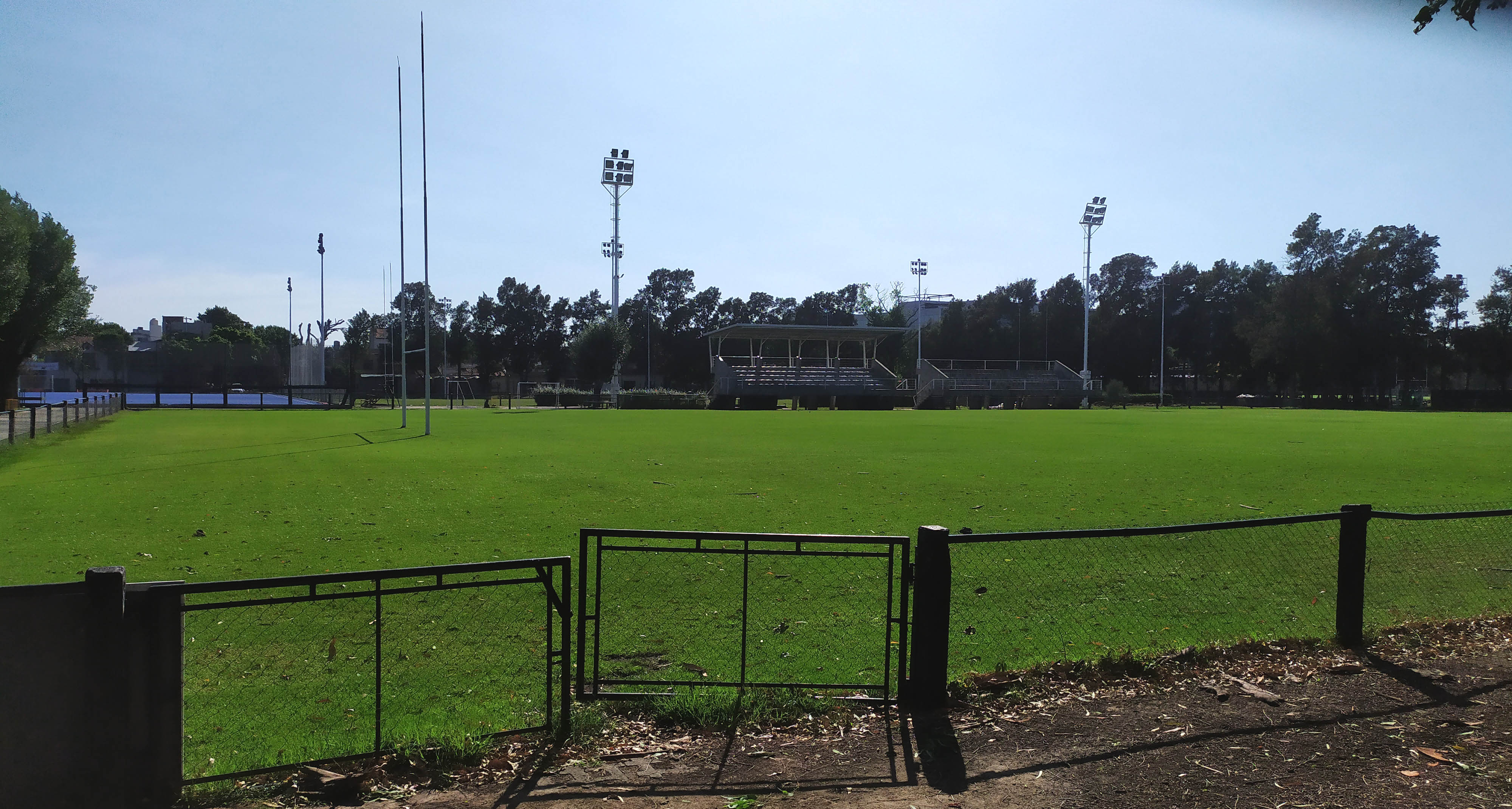
Rugby stadium

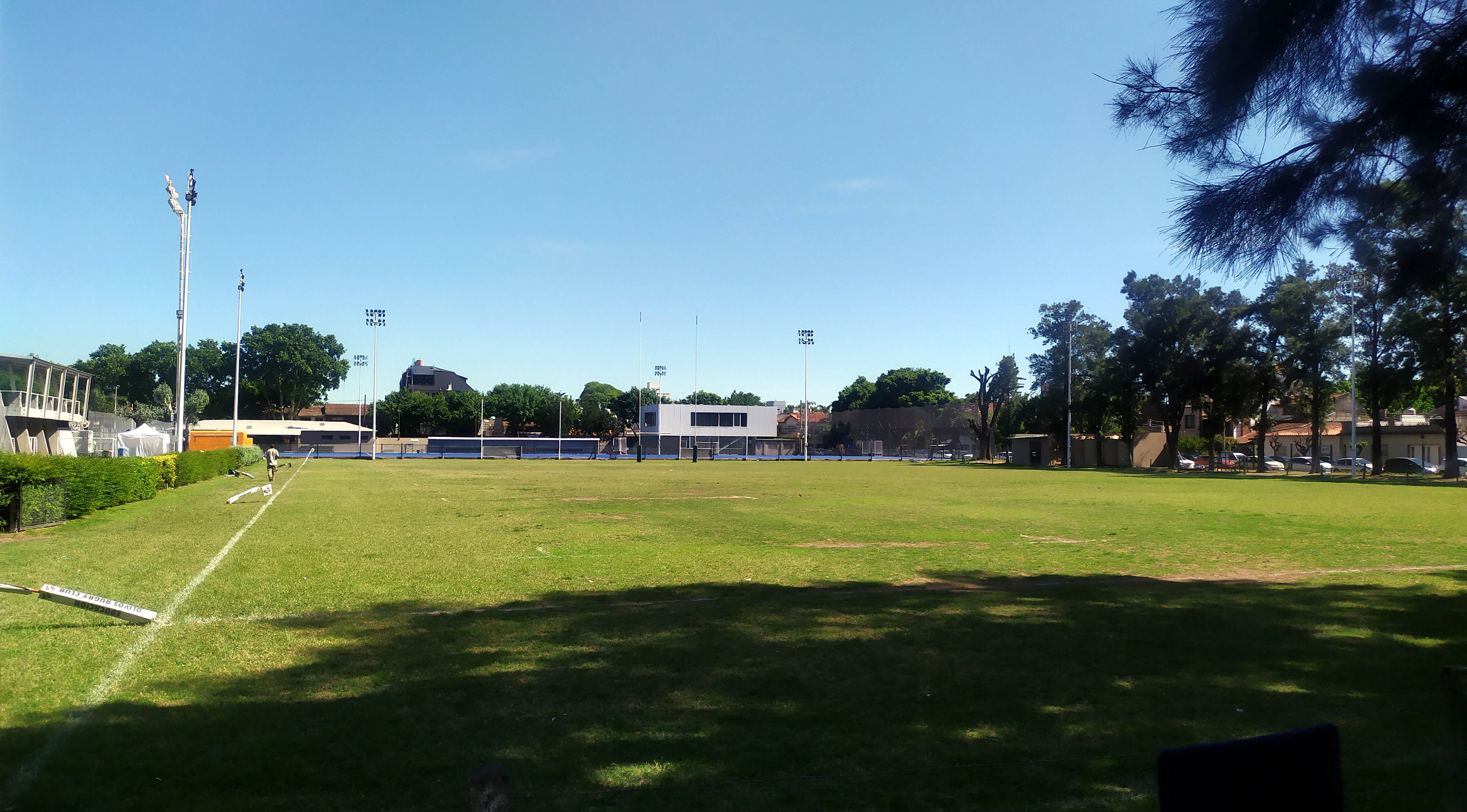
Auxiliary field

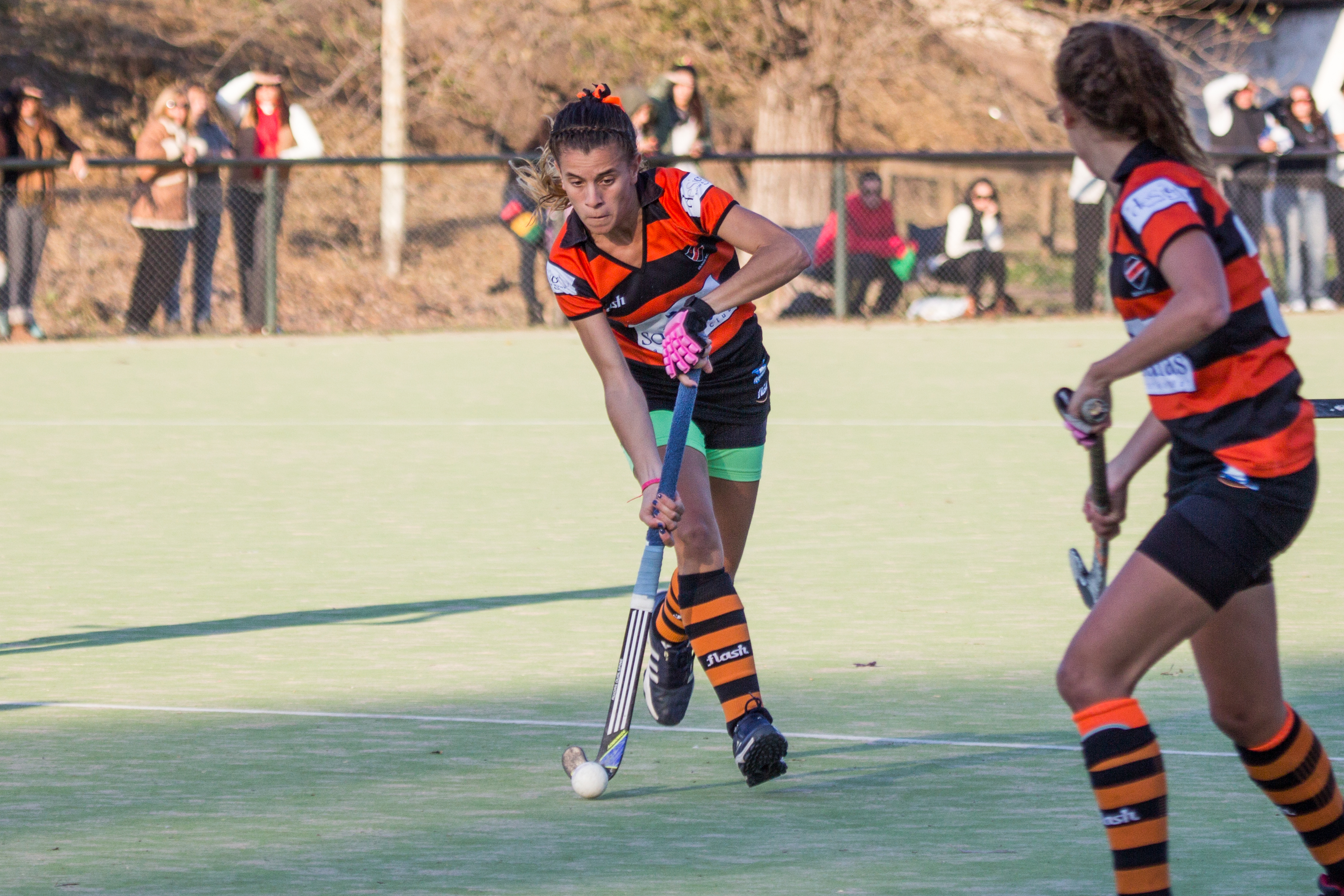
Hockey players
