= Asociación Deportiva Francesa =

Argentine rugby and field hockey club

(Argentina) Deportiva Francesa
- Full name: Asociación Deportiva Francesa
- Union: URBA
- Nickname(s): Depo, Tiva
- Founded: 11 April 1913; 113 years ago
- Ground(s): Manuel Alberti, Argentina
- Chairman: Juan Blanco
- President: Martín Patané
- Coach: Rodrigo Roncero
- League: Primera A
- 2026: 12th.
Team kit

Official website
- adfclub.com

Asociación Deportiva Francesa is an Argentine rugby union and field hockey club sited in the Manuel Alberti district of Pilar Partido. The rugby team currently plays in Primera División A, the second division of the URBA league system.

The field hockey team plays at tournaments organised by the Buenos Aires Hockey Association (AHBA).

== History ==
The club was founded in 1913 by a group of French immigrants and Argentine natives from the merger of two French sports clubs, Societé Sportive Française and Club Sportif Francais. The name chosen was "Sportive Francaise", in order to increase the emotional bonds between both countries through the practise of sports. The first president of the club was Georges Roy and it was originally located on Venezuela street in the city of Buenos Aires.

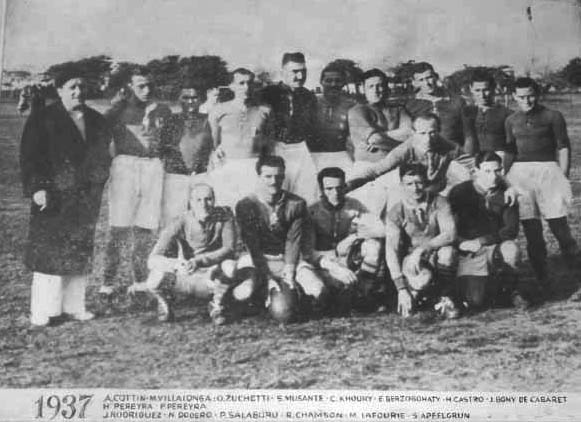
The rugby union team in 1937.

At the beginning the club hosted the practise of athletics, association football, basketball, boxing, rugby union, and tennis. Sportiva Francesa was also founding member of the Argentine Basketball Federation. The rugby union team promoted to the first division in 1925.

Deportiva Francesa moved from Wilde to Vicente López Partido in Greater Buenos Aires, close to the train station. The first official victory was in 1920 when Depo defeated Buenos Aires FC by 6-0.

Between the decades of 1920 and 1930, the team took part in all the championships organised by the Rugby Union although the club facilities had been completely destroyed by a terrible flooding in 1921.

Deportiva was promoted to first division in 1931 although the team was relegated to the second division the following year. Nevertheless, in 1947 a big group of players from Club Gimnasia y Esgrima de Buenos Aires joined Deportiva Francesa. The following year, Depo promoted to the first division where the team remained 16 seasons until 1963. Deportiva Francesa was the first Argentine rugby club to tour on Europe, where the team played 10 matches with 5 victories and 2 losses. The club played friendly games in Portugal, Spain, Italy, France and the Netherlands during the 87-day tour.

In the 1950s and 1960s Deportiva played its home games in Castelar, Ramos Mejía and the city of Buenos Aires until 1957 when the club acquired the "Quinta Las Palmas", a country house located in Del Viso where Deportiva built its facilities. In the 2000s Deportiva Francesa added a women's field hockey section.

In November 2011, Deportiva Francesa promoted to the first division, after defeating Regatas Bella Vista 27–25 in the final game with a try scored in the last minute of the match. Therefore, the team played at Torneo de la URBA Grupo I in the 2012 season, but it was relegated at the end of the season.

== Notable players ==
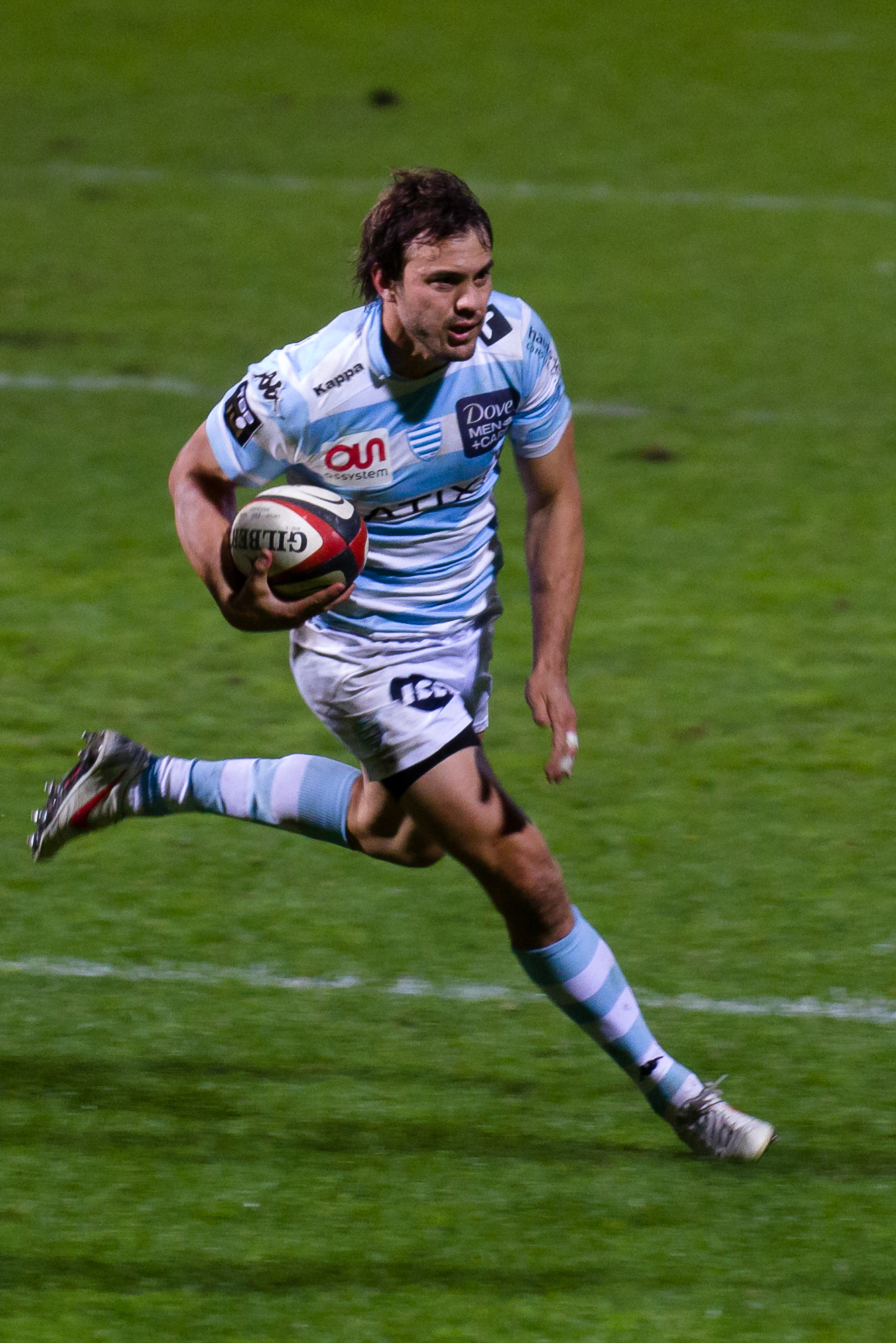
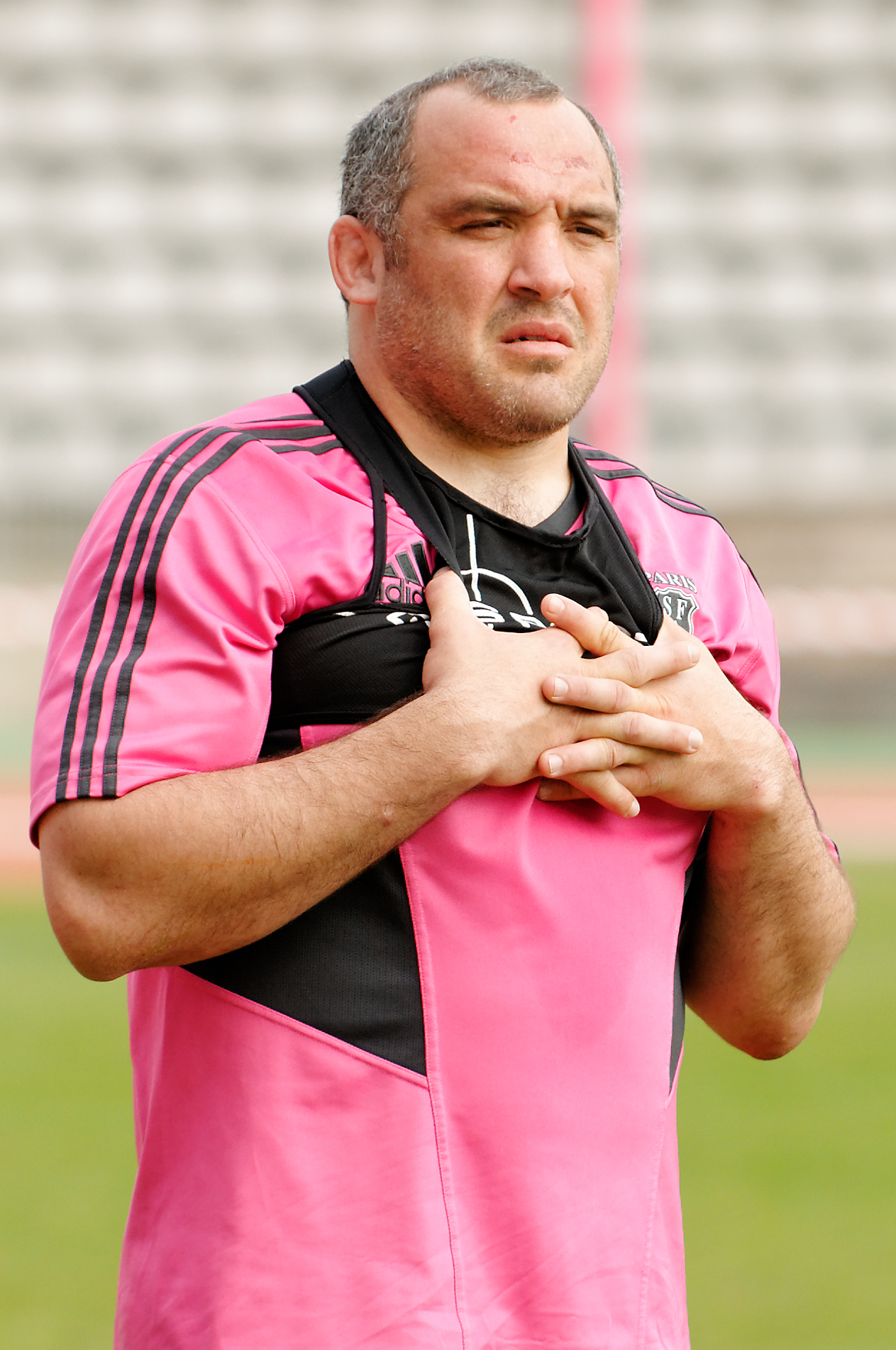
Juan Martín Hernández (left), and Rodrigo Roncero.
- Juan Martín Hernández (2001–03)
- Rodrigo Roncero (-2002)
- José Javier Fernández
- Rubén Castro
- Mario Carluccio
- Enrique Bianchetti
- Enrique Mitchelstein
- Raúl Pesce
- Jorge Pulido
- Juan Luis Guidi
